= 2016 Currie Cup qualification =

Domestic rugby union competition

- Countries: South Africa; Namibia
- Date: 9 April – 23 July 2016
- Matches played: 105
- Tries scored: 850 (average 8.1 per match)
- Top point scorer: George Whitehead (166)
- Top try scorer: Selvyn Davids (16)

The 2016 Currie Cup qualification series (Note: The competition was initially called Currie Cup Qualifying. This was changed to the Provincial Cup on the South African Rugby Union website shortly before the competition started, but reverted to Currie Cup Qualifying a few weeks later. Match reports and other media released used both names for the competition.) was a South African rugby union competition organised by the South African Rugby Union which was played between 9 April and 23 July 2016. It featured all fourteen South African provincial unions plus the Welwitschias from Namibia and served as a qualifying competition for the 2016 Currie Cup, the 78th edition of South Africa's premier domestic rugby union competition. Nine teams from this competition advanced to the 2016 Currie Cup Premier Division, while the remaining six teams progressed to the 2016 Currie Cup First Division.

== Competition rules and information ==
All fifteen teams in the competition played against each other once over the course of the qualification competition, either at home or away. Teams received four points for a win and two points for a draw. Bonus points were awarded to teams that scored 4 or more tries in a game, as well as to teams that lost a match by 7 points or less. Teams were ranked by log points, then points difference (points scored less points conceded).

The six main teams affiliated to Super Rugby franchises – Blue Bulls, Eastern Province Kings, Free State XV, Golden Lions XV, Sharks XV and Western Province – automatically qualified to the 2016 Currie Cup Premier Division, along with the three highest-ranked non-franchise teams. The remaining six teams qualified to the 2016 Currie Cup First Division. Points from the qualification stage were not carried over to the second stage.

== Teams ==
The teams that competed in the 2016 Currie Cup qualification competition were:

Location of teams in the 2016 Currie Cup qualification competition

=== Team Listing ===
2016 Currie Cup qualification teams
Team	Sponsored Name	Stadium/s	Sponsored Name
Blue Bulls	Vodacom Blue Bulls	Loftus Versfeld, Pretoria	Loftus Versfeld
Boland Cavaliers	Boland Cavaliers	Boland Stadium, Wellington	Boland Stadium
Border Bulldogs	Border Bulldogs	Buffalo City Stadium, East London	Buffalo City Stadium
Eastern Province Kings	Eastern Province Kings	Nelson Mandela Bay Stadium, Port Elizabeth	Nelson Mandela Bay Stadium
Falcons	Hino Valke	Barnard Stadium, Kempton Park	Barnard Stadium
Free State XV	Toyota Free State XV	Free State Stadium, Bloemfontein	Toyota Stadium
Golden Lions XV	Xerox Golden Lions XV	Ellis Park Stadium, Johannesburg	Emirates Airline Park
Griffons	Down Touch Griffons	North West Stadium, Welkom	HT Pelatona Projects Stadium
Griquas	Griquas	Griqua Park, Kimberley	Griqua Park
Leopards	Leopards	Olën Park, Potchefstroom	Profert Olën Park
Pumas	Steval Pumas	Mbombela Stadium, Mbombela	Mbombela Stadium
Sharks XV	Cell C Sharks XV	Kings Park Stadium, Durban	Growthpoint Kings Park
SWD Eagles	SWD Eagles	Outeniqua Park, George	Outeniqua Park
Welwitschias	Windhoek Draught Welwitschias	Hage Geingob Stadium, Windhoek	Hage Geingob Stadium
Western Province	DHL Western Province	Newlands Stadium, Cape Town	DHL Newlands

== Log ==
The final log for the 2016 Currie Cup qualification tournament is:

2016 Currie Cup qualification log
Pos	Team	Pld	W	D	L	PF	PA	PD	TF	TA	TB	LB	Pts	Qualification
1	Western Province	14	13	0	1	548	303	+245	77	34	9	0	61	2016 Currie Cup Premier Division
2	Griquas	14	11	0	3	485	333	+152	63	47	11	1	56	2016 Currie Cup Premier Division
3	Boland Cavaliers	14	11	0	3	502	290	+212	67	38	9	1	54	2016 Currie Cup Premier Division
4	Pumas	14	10	0	4	417	261	+156	55	34	8	3	51	2016 Currie Cup Premier Division
5	Golden Lions XV	14	8	1	5	594	353	+241	83	45	10	3	47	2016 Currie Cup Premier Division
6	Free State XV	14	8	0	6	372	337	+35	52	41	8	4	44	2016 Currie Cup Premier Division
7	Blue Bulls	14	7	0	7	459	376	+83	65	45	8	2	38	2016 Currie Cup Premier Division
8	Leopards	14	6	0	8	448	450	−2	58	62	10	3	37	2016 Currie Cup First Division
9	Griffons	14	7	0	7	519	498	+21	69	70	8	0	36	2016 Currie Cup First Division
10	Sharks XV	14	6	0	8	338	399	−61	43	58	6	3	33	2016 Currie Cup Premier Division
11	SWD Eagles	14	5	0	9	409	365	+44	52	44	6	4	30	2016 Currie Cup First Division
12	Falcons	14	5	0	9	407	473	−66	57	64	6	4	30	2016 Currie Cup First Division
13	Border Bulldogs	14	5	0	9	364	424	−60	49	55	5	1	26	2016 Currie Cup First Division
14	Eastern Province Kings	14	2	1	11	278	513	−235	35	72	3	0	13	2016 Currie Cup Premier Division
15	Welwitschias	14	0	0	14	171	936	−765	25	141	1	0	1	2016 Currie Cup First Division

Rules for classification: 4 points for a win; 2 points for a draw; 1 bonus point for a loss by seven points or less; 1 bonus point for scoring four or more tries in a match.
The six franchise teams, plus the three highest-placed non-franchise teams will qualify to the 2016 Currie Cup Premier Division, the remaining six teams will qualify to the 2016 Currie Cup First Division.

=== Round-by-round ===
The table below shows each team's progression throughout the season. For each round, each team's cumulative points total is shown with the overall log position in brackets.

Team Progression – 2016 Currie Cup qualification
Team	R1	R2	R3	R4	R5	R6	R7	R8	R9	R10	R11	R12	R13	R14	R15	R16
Western Province	4 (5th)	4 (9th)	9 (6th)	14 (2nd)	14 (5th)	19 (4th)	23 (3rd)	27 (3rd)	32 (2nd)	32 (2nd)	37 (2nd)	42 (2nd)	47 (2nd)	51 (2nd)	56 (1st)	61 (1st)
Griquas	5 (2nd)	10 (1st)	15 (1st)	20 (1st)	24 (1st)	29 (1st)	34 (1st)	35 (1st)	40 (1st)	41 (1st)	41 (1st)	46 (1st)	51 (1st)	56 (1st)	56 (2nd)	56 (2nd)
Boland Cavaliers	5 (4th)	10 (2nd)	11 (4th)	11 (6th)	16 (2nd)	21 (2nd)	25 (2nd)	30 (2nd)	30 (4th)	30 (4th)	35 (4th)	40 (4th)	45 (3rd)	45 (3rd)	49 (3rd)	54 (3rd)
Pumas	1 (8th)	2 (11th)	6 (9th)	10 (8th)	15 (3rd)	20 (3rd)	21 (5th)	26 (4th)	31 (3rd)	31 (3rd)	36 (3rd)	41 (3rd)	41 (4th)	41 (5th)	46 (5th)	51 (4th)
Golden Lions XV	1 (9th)	6 (5th)	11 (3rd)	12 (5th)	12 (9th)	12 (9th)	17 (7th)	20 (8th)	21 (8th)	26 (5th)	26 (6th)	31 (5th)	36 (5th)	41 (4th)	46 (4th)	47 (5th)
Free State XV	5 (3rd)	6 (6th)	8 (7th)	8 (9th)	13 (8th)	17 (5th)	22 (4th)	24 (6th)	25 (6th)	25 (7th)	29 (5th)	30 (7th)	35 (6th)	39 (6th)	40 (6th)	44 (6th)
Blue Bulls	0 (12th)	4 (10th)	4 (13th)	4 (14th)	5 (14th)	5 (14th)	7 (14th)	8 (14th)	13 (12th)	18 (13th)	23 (9th)	27 (8th)	28 (8th)	33 (7th)	38 (7th)	38 (7th)
Leopards	0 (10th)	1 (13th)	5 (12th)	6 (12th)	7 (13th)	12 (11th)	17 (8th)	22 (7th)	23 (7th)	23 (8th)	23 (10th)	24 (10th)	25 (11th)	30 (9th)	32 (9th)	37 (8th)
Griffons	0 (14th)	5 (7th)	5 (11th)	10 (7th)	14 (4th)	14 (7th)	19 (6th)	24 (5th)	25 (5th)	25 (6th)	25 (8th)	30 (6th)	30 (7th)	31 (8th)	36 (8th)	31 (9th)
Sharks XV	0 (11th)	2 (12th)	7 (8th)	7 (10th)	11 (10th)	12 (10th)	12 (11th)	12 (12th)	17 (10th)	18 (12th)	18 (13th)	18 (13th)	23 (12th)	28 (10th)	28 (11th)	33 (10th)
SWD Eagles	5 (1st)	10 (3rd)	10 (5th)	14 (3rd)	14 (6th)	15 (6th)	15 (9th)	15 (10th)	15 (11th)	20 (9th)	25 (7th)	26 (9th)	26 (9th)	26 (11th)	28 (10th)	30 (11th)
Falcons	4 (7th)	5 (8th)	6 (10th)	7 (11th)	7 (12th)	11 (12th)	12 (12th)	13 (11th)	13 (13th)	18 (11th)	18 (12th)	19 (12th)	20 (13th)	20 (13th)	25 (13th)	30 (12th)
Border Bulldogs	4 (6th)	9 (4th)	14 (2nd)	14 (4th)	14 (7th)	14 (8th)	14 (10th)	19 (9th)	19 (9th)	20 (10th)	20 (11th)	20 (11th)	25 (10th)	25 (12th)	25 (12th)	26 (13th)
Eastern Province Kings	0 (15th)	0 (14th)	0 (14th)	5 (13th)	9 (11th)	9 (13th)	9 (13th)	12 (13th)	12 (14th)	12 (14th)	12 (14th)	12 (14th)	12 (14th)	12 (14th)	12 (14th)	13 (14th)
Welwitschias	0 (13th)	0 (15th)	0 (15th)	0 (15th)	0 (15th)	1 (15th)	1 (15th)	1 (15th)	1 (15th)	1 (15th)	1 (15th)	1 (15th)	1 (15th)	1 (15th)	1 (15th)	1 (15th)
Key:	win	draw	loss	bye												

== Matches ==
The following matches were played in the 2016 Currie Cup qualification series:

=== Round One ===
7 April 2016	Griquas	34–14	Griffons	Griqua Park, Kimberley
18:45	Try: Mzwanele Zito 1'; Johnathan Francke 35'; AJ Coertzen 70'; Clinton Swart 83'; Con: Clinton Swart 36' (1/4); Pen: Clinton Swart 15', 48', 58', 66' (4/5); Drop: Clinton Swart (0/2)	Report; Scoreboard	Try: Martin Sithole 22'; Selvyn Davids 75'; Con: George Whitehead 23', 76' (2/2); Pen: George Whitehead (0/2)	Attendance: 200; Referee: Jaco Peyper

8 April 2016	Golden Lions XV	23–27	Border Bulldogs	Ellis Park Stadium, Johannesburg
14:00	Try: Ricky Schroeder 46'; Lourens Erasmus 63'; Con: Marnitz Boshoff 47', 64' (2/2); Pen: Marnitz Boshoff 4', 58', 76' (3/3); Drop: Marnitz Boshoff (0/1)	Report; Scoreboard	Try: Sethu Tom 27'; Makazole Mapimpi 51'; Wandile Putuma 78'; Con: Oliver Zono 28' (1/1); Masixole Banda 52' (1/1); Logan Basson 79' (1/1); Pen: Oliver Zono 21', 33' (2/4)	Attendance: 120; Referee: Jaco van Heerden

8 April 2016	Western Province	30–16	Blue Bulls	Newlands Stadium, Cape Town
16:15	Try: Daniël du Plessis 12'; Tim Whitehead 17'; Meyer Swanepoel 78'; Con: Brandon Thomson 13', 18', 79' (3/3); Pen: Brandon Thomson 2', 40', 54' (3/5)	Report; Scoreboard	Try: Nqoba Mxoli 25'; Con: Tony Jantjies 26' (1/1); Pen: Tony Jantjies 5', 30', 37' (3/3); Cards: Le Roux Roets (yellow card) 60' to 71'	Attendance: 350; Referee: AJ Jacobs

8 April 2016	Pumas	9–12	Falcons	Mbombela Stadium, Mbombela
19:00	Pen: Justin van Staden 19', 25', 72' (3/3); Cards: Khwezi Mona (yellow card) 57' to 67'	Report; Scoreboard	Try: Dean Muir 39'; Andrew van Wyk 63'; Con: Karlo Aspeling 40' (1/2); Pen: Karlo Aspeling (0/1)	Attendance: 1,680; Referee: Cwengile Jadezweni

8 April 2016	Sharks XV	25–37	Boland Cavaliers	Sugar Ray Xulu Stadium, Clermont
19:00	Try: S'bura Sithole 29'; Khaya Majola 54'; Wandile Mjekevu 62'; Con: Inny Radebe 30', 63' (2/3); Pen: Inny Radebe 8', 35' (2/2)	Report; Scoreboard	Try: Shaun Adendorff 6'; Shaun McDonald 11'; Ryan Nell 25'; Danwel Demas 42'; Adriaan Carelse 51'; Con: Nico Scheepers 12', 26', 43' (3/5); Pen: Nico Scheepers 3', 71' (2/2)	Referee: Rodney Boneparte

9 April 2016	Free State XV	32–17	Welwitschias	Free State Stadium, Bloemfontein
14:30	Try: Reniel Hugo 7'; Reinhardt Erwee 15', 26'; Oupa Mohojé 38'; Joseph Dweba 55'; Elandré Huggett 79'; Con: Ruan van Rensburg 8' (1/4); Reinhardt Erwee (0/2)	Report; Scoreboard	Try: Malcolm Moore 23'; Johann Tromp 73'; Con: Shaun Kaizemi 24', 74' (2/2); Pen: Johann Tromp 19' (1/1); Shaun Kaizemi (0/1)	Attendance: 300; Referee: Quinton Immelman

9 April 2016	Eastern Province Kings	14–37	SWD Eagles	Nelson Mandela Bay Stadium, Port Elizabeth
16:30	Try: penalty try 1'; Jeremy Ward 65'; Con: Michael Brink 2', 65' (2/2)	Report; Scoreboard	Try: Daniel Roberts 3'; Martin du Toit 19'; Riaan Arends 53'; Leighton Eksteen 75'; Con: Hansie Graaff 4', 20', 54' (3/3); Jacquin Jansen 76' (1/1); Pen: Hansie Graaff 47', 49', 62' (3/3); Cards: Mzo Dyantyi (yellow card) 2' to 12'; Peet van der Walt (yellow card) 90'	Attendance: 1,346; Referee: Craig Joubert

Bye/s: Leopards

=== Round Two ===
15 April 2016	Falcons	29–56	Griquas	Barnard Stadium, Kempton Park
15:00	Try: Etienne Taljaard 23', 67', 80'; Andries Truter 34'; Thabo Mamojele 57'; Con: Karlo Aspeling (0/2); Damian Engledoe (0/1); Christo Coetzee 68', 80' (2/2)	Report; Scoreboard	Try: AJ Coertzen 6'; Clinton Swart 8'; Jason Fraser 30', 70'; Rudi van Rooyen 38', 41'; Alshaun Bock 55'; Ederies Arendse 62'; Con: Clinton Swart 7', 9', 31', 39', 42', 56', 62' (7/7); Gouws Prinsloo 71' (1/1)	Attendance: 500; Referee: Stephan Geldenhuys

15 April 2016	SWD Eagles	25–21	Pumas	NMMU Saasveld, George
16:00	Try: Martin du Toit 21'; Mark Pretorius 52', 62'; Christo du Plessis 56'; Con: Hansie Graaff 52' (1/4); Pen: Hansie Graaff 10' (1/2)	Report; Scoreboard	Try: Marnus Schoeman 25'; Marcello Sampson 36'; Con: Justin van Staden 26' (1/2); Pen: Justin van Staden 7', 19', 38' (3/3)	Attendance: 300; Referee: Rodney Boneparte

15 April 2016	Border Bulldogs	37–32	Sharks XV	Buffalo City Stadium, East London
19:00	Try: Makazole Mapimpi 14', 30', 72', 77'; Oliver Zono 26', 60'; Con: Masixole Banda 27', 31' (2/4); Oliver Zono (0/2); Pen: Masixole Banda 9' (1/1); Cards: Siya Mdaka (yellow card) 68' to 78'	Report; Scoreboard	Try: Wandile Mjekevu 43', 52'; Wian Vosloo 67'; Khaya Majola 76'; Con: Inny Radebe 53' (1/2); Tristan Tedder 68', 77' (2/2); Pen: Inny Radebe 11' (1/2); Tristan Tedder 79' (1/1)	Attendance: 5,500; Referee: Pro Legoete

16 April 2016	Blue Bulls	20–17	Free State XV	Loftus Versfeld, Pretoria
14:15	Try: Tapiwa Tsomondo 69'; Manie Libbok 72'; Callie Visagie 75'; Con: Joshua Stander 76' (1/3); Pen: Manie Libbok 15' (1/1)	Report; Scoreboard	Try: Ox Nché 25'; Ntokozo Vidima 44'; Con: Pieter-Steyn de Wet 26', 45' (2/2); Pen: Pieter-Steyn de Wet 51' (1/2); Drop: Pieter-Steyn de Wet (0/1)	Attendance: 2,500; Referee: Quinton Immelman

16 April 2016	Griffons	76–26	Leopards	HT Pelatona Projects Stadium, Welkom
15:00	Try: Selvyn Davids 7', 20', 31'; George Whitehead 13', 48', 61'; De Wet Kruger 34'; Norman Nelson 44'; Tertius Maarman 56'; Vuyo Mbotho 66', 72'; Con: George Whitehead 8', 14', 21', 32', 35', 45', 49', 57', 67' (9/10); Franna du Toit (0/1); Pen: George Whitehead 3' (1/1); Cards: Samora Fihlani (yellow card) 75'	Report; Scoreboard	Try: Tiaan Liebenberg 25'; Roan Grobbelaar 54'; Leon du Plessis 58'; Adrian Vermeulen 77'; Con: Rhyno Smith 55', 59', 78' (3/4)	Attendance: 2,500; Referee: Lourens van der Merwe

16 April 2016	Boland Cavaliers	37–18	Eastern Province Kings	Boland Stadium, Wellington
16:00	Try: Ockie van Zyl 3'; Chadley Wenn 17'; Zandré Jordaan 54'; Danwel Demas 64', 70'; Con: Nico Scheepers 4', 18', 71' (3/5); Pen: Nico Scheepers 24', 44' (2/2)	Report; Scoreboard	Try: Somila Jho 33'; Courtney Winnaar 58'; Con: Courtney Winnaar (0/1); Simon Bolze 59' (1/1); Pen: Courtney Winnaar 13', 20' (2/3); Simon Bolze (0/1); Cards: Tazz Fuzani (yellow card) 16' to 26'; Sintu Manjezi (yellow card) 51' to 61'	Referee: Francois Pretorius

16 April 2016	Welwitschias	12–66	Golden Lions XV	Hage Geingob Stadium, Windhoek
16:00	Try: Riaan van Zyl 4'; Darryl de la Harpe 53'; Con: Shaun Kaizemi 54' (1/2)	Report; Scoreboard	Try: Jacques Nel 2'; Selom Gavor 11', 30', 41'; Ramone Samuels 15'; Koch Marx 32'; JW Bell 36', 58'; Ruaan Lerm 63', 70'; Con: Marnitz Boshoff 3', 12', 16', 37', 42', 59' (6/8); Shaun Reynolds 64', 72' (2/2)	Attendance: 3,000; Referee: Archie Sehlako

Bye/s: Western Province

=== Round Three ===
22 April 2016	Free State XV	31–36	Western Province	CUT Stadium, Bloemfontein
15:00	Try: Joseph Dweba 4'; Mosolwa Mafuma 37', 78'; JP Smith 55'; Tiaan Liebenberg 76'; Con: Sias Ebersohn 56', 77', 79' (3/4)	Report; Scoreboard	Try: Jurie van Vuuren 19'; Daniël du Plessis 41', 48'; Justin Phillips 46'; Luke Stringer 71'; Con: Scott van Breda 20', 42', 49', 72' (4/5); Pen: Scott van Breda (0/1); Grant Hermanus 67' (1/1); Drop: Grant Hermanus (0/1)	Attendance: 300; Referee: Ben Crouse

22 April 2016	Leopards	26–24	Falcons	Olën Park, Potchefstroom
19:00	Try: Walt Steenkamp 14'; Rhyno Smith 57'; Con: Rhyno Smith 15', 58' (2/2); Pen: Rhyno Smith 8', 22', 53', 78' (4/5)	Report; Scoreboard	Try: Kyle Hendricks 5', 36'; Sino Nyoka 44'; Con: Karlo Aspeling 6', 37', 45' (3/3); Pen: Karlo Aspeling 71' (1/1)	Referee: Cwengile Jadezweni

22 April 2016	Pumas	12–10	Boland Cavaliers	Mbombela Stadium, Mbombela
19:00	Pen: Justin van Staden 2', 10', 40', 51' (4/4)	Report; Scoreboard	Try: Nico Scheepers 23'; Con: Nico Scheepers 24' (1/1); Pen: Nico Scheepers 34' (1/3)	Referee: Stephan Geldenhuys

23 April 2016	Eastern Province Kings	14–26	Border Bulldogs	Nelson Mandela Bay Stadium, Port Elizabeth
14:00	Try: Simon Bolze 30'; Courtney Winnaar 80'; Con: Simon Bolze 31' (1/1); Courtney Winnaar 81' (1/1); Cards: Franswa Ueckermann (yellow card) 43' to 53'	Report; Scoreboard	Try: Michael Makase 46'; Siyamthanda Ngande 60'; Ludwe Booi 71'; Hendri Storm 77'; Con: Oliver Zono 47', 61', 72' (3/4); Pen: Masixole Banda (0/1); Oliver Zono (0/2)	Referee: AJ Jacobs

23 April 2016	Golden Lions XV	38–17	Blue Bulls	Alberton Rugby Club, Alberton
15:00	Try: Anthony Volmink 7'; Jacques Nel 25'; Arnout Malherbe 38'; Stokkies Hanekom 43'; Ruaan Lerm 78'; Con: Shaun Reynolds 8', 26', 39', 44' (4/4); Ashlon Davids 79' (1/1); Pen: Shaun Reynolds 4' (1/2); Cards: Ricky Schroeder (yellow card) 67' to 77'	Report; Scoreboard	Try: Tapiwa Tsomondo 34'; Corniel Els 65'; Con: Joshua Stander 35', 66' (2/2); Pen: Joshua Stander 8' (1/2); Cards: Nico Janse van Rensburg (yellow card) 24' to 34'	Referee: Lourens van der Merwe

23 April 2016	Griquas	27–17	SWD Eagles	Griqua Park, Kimberley
15:00	Try: Clinton Swart 19'; AJ Coertzen 35'; Johnathan Francke 38'; Alshaun Bock 68'; Con: Clinton Swart 20' (1/3); Eric Zana 69' (1/1); Pen: Clinton Swart 26' (1/2)	Report; Scoreboard	Try: Mark Pretorius 6'; Kurt Haupt 81'; Con: Hansie Graaff 7', 82' (2/2); Pen: Hansie Graaff 22' (1/2); Cards: Grant le Roux (yellow card) 78'	Referee: Pro Legoete

23 April 2016	Sharks XV	48–18	Welwitschias	King Zwelithini Stadium, Umlazi
15:00	Try: Marius Louw 8', 38', 51'; Tristan Tedder 34'; Stephan Coetzee 60'; Curwin Bosch 73'; Con: Tristan Tedder 9', 35', 39', 52', 61', 74' (6/6); Pen: Tristan Tedder 2', 56' (2/2)	Report; Scoreboard	Try: Riaan van Zyl 6'; Russell van Wyk 41'; Rohan Kitshoff 47'; Con: Shaun Kaizemi (0/3); Pen: Shaun Kaizemi 20' (1/1); Cards: Rohan Kitshoff (yellow card) 59' to 69'	Attendance: 3,000; Referee: Rodney Boneparte

Bye/s: Griffons

=== Round Four ===
27 April 2016	Falcons	26–49	Griffons	Barnard Stadium, Kempton Park
15:00	Try: Shane Kirkwood 10'; Reg Muller 31'; Etienne Taljaard 75'; Grant Janke 81'; Con: Karlo Aspeling 11', 32' (2/2); Damian Engledoe 82' (1/2)	Report; Scoreboard	Try: Selvyn Davids 2'; Warren Williams 19', 35', 42'; Duan Pretorius 25'; De Wet Kruger 47'; Tertius Maarman 69'; Con: George Whitehead 26', 36', 43', 69' (4/7); Pen: George Whitehead 40', 54' (2/3)	Referee: Lourens van der Merwe

27 April 2016	SWD Eagles	26–21	Leopards	Outeniqua Park, George
17:05	Try: Charles Radebe 15'; Johan Steyn 55'; Con: Hansie Graaff 16', 56' (2/2); Pen: Hansie Graaff 22', 27', 44', 49' (4/4); Cards: Juandré Digue (yellow card) 33' to 43'	Report; Scoreboard	Try: Wilmar Arnoldi 36'; Adrian Vermeulen 52'; Con: Rhyno Smith 53' (1/2); Pen: Rhyno Smith 8', 14', 80' (3/3); Cards: Wilmar Arnoldi (yellow card) 55' to 67'; Roan Grobbelaar (yellow card) 74'	Referee: Rodney Boneparte

29 April 2016	Boland Cavaliers	14–30	Griquas	Boland Stadium, Wellington
15:15	Try: Christopher Bosch 65'; William van Wyk 71'; Con: Adriaan Carelse 66', 72' (2/2); Pen: Theuns Kotzé (0/2)	Report; Scoreboard	Try: Jason Fraser 2'; AJ Coertzen 52'; Alshaun Bock 67'; Marius Fourie 75'; Con: Clinton Swart 3' (1/2); Eric Zana (0/1); Ntabeni Dukisa 76' (1/1); Pen: Clinton Swart 40', 44' (2/2); Drop: Eric Zana (0/1); Cards: Rudi van Rooyen (yellow card) 90'	Referee: Cwengile Jadezweni

30 April 2016	Border Bulldogs	3–28	Pumas	Buffalo City Stadium, East London
15:00	Pen: Oliver Zono 18' (1/2); Cards: Sonwabiso Mqalo (yellow card) 71'	Report; Scoreboard	Try: Marcello Sampson 37'; Tyler Fisher 61'; Hennie Skorbinski 77'; Con: Justin van Staden 38', 78' (2/3); Pen: Justin van Staden 42', 52', 70' (3/4)	Referee: Francois Pretorius

30 April 2016	Welwitschias	18–31	Eastern Province Kings	Hage Geingob Stadium, Windhoek
16:00	Try: Johann Tromp 20', 57'; Con: Shaun Kaizemi 58' (1/2); Pen: Shaun Kaizemi 38', 45' (2/2); Cards: Shaun du Preez (yellow card) 14' to 24'; Leneve Damens (yellow card) 15' to 25'	Report; Scoreboard	Try: SF Nieuwoudt 9'; Courtney Winnaar 17'; Somila Jho 34'; Sphu Msutwana 51'; Athi Mayinje 74'; Con: Simon Bolze 18' (1/2); Athi Mayinje 35', 75' (2/3)	Referee: Pro Legoete

30 April 2016	Western Province	27–24	Golden Lions XV	Newlands Stadium, Cape Town
16:15	Try: Rabz Maxwane 8'; Mike Willemse 19', 52'; Khanyo Ngcukana 35'; Con: Grant Hermanus 36', 53' (2/4); Pen: Grant Hermanus 80' (1/1); Cards: Grant Hermanus (yellow card) 54' to 64'	Report; Scoreboard	Try: Sylvian Mahuza 50', 56'; Shaun Reynolds 73'; Con: Marnitz Boshoff 51' (1/1); Shaun Reynolds 57', 74' (2/2); Pen: Marnitz Boshoff 14' (1/2); Shaun Reynolds (0/1); Cards: Ricky Schroeder (yellow card) 41' to 51'	Referee: Rasta Rasivhenge

Bye/s: Blue Bulls, Free State XV, Sharks XV

=== Round Five ===
6 May 2016	Griffons	30–14	SWD Eagles	HT Pelatona Projects Stadium, Welkom
15:00	Try: Selvyn Davids 20', 64'; Duan Pretorius 47'; Con: George Whitehead 21', 48', 65' (3/3); Pen: George Whitehead 29', 34', 57' (3/3)	Report; Scoreboard	Try: Mark Pretorius 42'; Daniel Roberts 69'; Con: Hansie Graaff 43', 70' (2/2)	Referee: Stephan Geldenhuys

7 May 2016	Eastern Province Kings	19–14	Blue Bulls	Nelson Mandela Bay Stadium, Port Elizabeth
14:15	Try: Liam Hendricks 30'; Con: Garrick Mattheus 31' (1/1); Pen: Garrick Mattheus 4', 25', 45', 50' (4/5); Drop: Garrick Mattheus (0/1)	Report; Scoreboard	Try: Joshua Stander 15'; Dean Greyling 54'; Con: Joshua Stander 16', 55' (2/2); Cards: Nqoba Mxoli (yellow card) 49' to 59'	Referee: Rasta Rasivhenge

7 May 2016	Leopards	31–43	Boland Cavaliers	Johann du Randt Stadium, Potchefstroom
14:30	Try: Jeandré Rudolph 11', 80'; Johan Deysel 34', 69'; Gene Willemse 72'; Con: Schalk Hugo 35' (1/2); Benhard Janse van Rensburg 70', 81' (2/3)	Report; Scoreboard	Try: Theuns Kotzé 4'; Sergio Torrens 7', 38'; Ryan Nell 45'; Christopher Bosch 66'; Edwin Sass 74'; Con: Theuns Kotzé 5', 8', 39', 46', 67' (5/6); Pen: Theuns Kotzé 27' (1/4)	Referee: Jaco van Heerden

7 May 2016	Golden Lions XV	15–29	Free State XV	Diggers Rugby Club, Randburg
15:00	Try: Ashlon Davids 38'; Koch Marx 41'; Con: Shaun Reynolds 42' (1/2); Pen: Shaun Reynolds 6' (1/2); Cards: Ruaan Lerm (yellow card) 48' to 59'; Derick Minnie (yellow card) 52' to 65'	Report; Scoreboard	Try: Maphutha Dolo 8'; Sias Ebersohn 15'; Joseph Dweba 49'; Jasper Wiese 54'; Con: Sias Ebersohn 9', 50', 55' (3/4); Pen: Sias Ebersohn 2' (1/3)	Referee: Francois Pretorius

7 May 2016	Griquas	21–12	Border Bulldogs	Griqua Park, Kimberley
15:00	Try: AJ le Roux 5'; Johnathan Francke 35'; Rudi van Rooyen 61'; Con: Clinton Swart 6', 36' (2/2); Ntabeni Dukisa 62' (1/1)	Report; Scoreboard	Try: Wandile Putuma 38'; Masixole Banda 75'; Con: Thembani Mkokeli (0/1); Masixole Banda 76' (1/1); Pen: Masixole Banda (0/1); Cards: Mihlali Mpafi (yellow card) 79'	Referee: Pro Legoete

7 May 2016	Pumas	47–7	Welwitschias	Ermelo High School, Ermelo
15:00	Try: François du Toit 7', 16', 75'; Lambert Groenewald 11', 21'; De-Jay Terblanche 33'; Hennie Skorbinski 54'; Con: Justin van Staden 8', 12', 17', 22', 34' (5/5); Marlou van Niekerk 55' (1/2); Cards: Nardus van der Walt (yellow card) 72'	Report; Scoreboard	Try: Russell van Wyk 67'; Con: Justin Nel 68' (1/1)	Referee: Egon Seconds

7 May 2016	Sharks XV	24–16	Western Province	Kings Park Stadium, Durban
17:30	Try: Marius Louw 31'; Tristan Tedder 42'; Alrin Eksteen 73'; Con: Tristan Tedder 32', 43', 74' (3/3); Pen: Tristan Tedder 25' (1/3); Cards: Mzamo Majola (yellow card) 58' to 68'	Report; Scoreboard	Try: Godlen Masimla 21'; Khanyo Ngcukana 66'; Con: Grant Hermanus (0/2); Pen: Grant Hermanus 5', 7' (2/3)	Referee: Quinton Immelman

Bye/s: Falcons

=== Round Six ===
13 May 2016	Blue Bulls	13–25	Pumas	Loftus Versfeld, Pretoria
15:00	Try: Marquit September 16'; Con: Joshua Stander 17' (1/1); Pen: Joshua Stander 26', 40' (2/2)	Report; Scoreboard	Try: Frank Herne 30'; Reynier van Rooyen 32'; Marcello Sampson 35'; Hoffmann Maritz 63'; Con: Justin van Staden 64' (1/4); Pen: Justin van Staden 54' (1/2)	Referee: Jaco Peyper

13 May 2016	Boland Cavaliers	56–17	Griffons	Boland Stadium, Wellington
15:00	Try: Ryan Nell 35'; Zandré Jordaan 38'; Danwel Demas 44'; Nico Scheepers 62'; Marnus Hugo 67'; Edwin Sass 72'; JC Genade 80'; Con: Theuns Kotzé 36', 39', 45' (3/3); Adriaan Carelse 63', 73', 81' (3/4); Pen: Theuns Kotzé 4', 31', 50' (3/3)	Report; Scoreboard	Try: Selvyn Davids 11'; Heinrich Roelfse 76'; Con: George Whitehead 12', 77' (2/2); Pen: George Whitehead 40' (1/1); Drop: George Whitehead (0/1); Cards: Khwezi Mkhafu (yellow card) 30' to 40'	Referee: Lourens van der Merwe

13 May 2016	Border Bulldogs	22–34	Leopards	Buffalo City Stadium, East London
19:00	Try: Johannes Jonker 40'; Nkosi Nofuma 64'; Makazole Mapimpi 75'; Con: Masixole Banda 40', 65' (2/3); Pen: Masixole Banda 4' (1/1); Cards: Siya Mdaka (yellow card) 21' to 31'	Report; Scoreboard	Try: Wilmar Arnoldi 7'; Johan Deysel 14'; Loftus Morrison 51'; Rhyno Smith 72'; Con: Rhyno Smith 8', 15', 52', 73' (4/4); Pen: Rhyno Smith 18' (1/3); Drop: Rhyno Smith 24' (1/2); Cards: Marno Redelinghuys (yellow card) 63'; Rhyno Smith (yellow card) 90'	Referee: Pro Legoete

13 May 2016	SWD Eagles	30–32	Falcons	Outeniqua Park, George
19:00	Try: Hentzwill Pedro 1', 45'; Daniel Roberts 11'; Con: Tom Kean 2', 12', 46' (3/3); Pen: Tom Kean 5', 34', 38' (3/3); Cards: Clinton Wagman (yellow card) 52' to 62'	Report; Scoreboard	Try: Dean Muir 20'; Kyle Hendricks 39'; Shane Kirkwood 53'; Con: Karlo Aspeling 21' (1/2); Kyle Hendricks (0/1); Pen: Karlo Aspeling 9', 24', 32', 55', 65' (5/5)	Referee: Quinton Immelman

14 May 2016	Free State XV	19–13	Sharks XV	Free State Stadium, Bloemfontein
14:15	Try: Maphutha Dolo 35'; JP Coetzee 48', 60'; Con: Sias Ebersohn 36', 49' (2/3)	Report; Scoreboard	Try: Khulu Marwana 38'; Sandile Kubekha 63'; Con: Tristan Tedder (0/2); Pen: Tristan Tedder 18' (1/1); Cards: Khulu Marwana (yellow card) 43' to 53'; Johan du Toit (yellow card) 58' to 68'	Attendance: 1,000; Referee: Stuart Berry

14 May 2016	Welwitschias	25–55	Griquas	Hage Geingob Stadium, Windhoek
16:00	Try: Philip Nashikaku 29'; Francois Wiese 38'; Justin Nel 59'; JC Winckler 80'; Con: Heinrich Smit (0/1); Johann Tromp (0/1); Justin Nel 60' (1/2); Pen: Heinrich Smit 9' (1/1)	Report; Scoreboard	Try: AJ Coertzen 1', 77'; Tiaan Dorfling 7', 27'; André Swarts 20'; JW Jonker 33'; Stephan Kotzé 56'; Thabo Mabuza 69'; Con: Gouws Prinsloo 2', 8', 21', 28', 34', 57' (6/8); Pen: Gouws Prinsloo 15' (1/1)	Referee: Egon Seconds

14 May 2016	Western Province	50–10	Eastern Province Kings	City Park Stadium, Athlone
16:00	Try: Frans van Wyk 8'; Devon Williams 14'; Justin Phillips 34'; Daniël du Plessis 43'; Scott van Breda 46', 55'; Mike Willemse 51'; Luke Stringer 69'; Con: Grant Hermanus 15' (1/3); Scott van Breda 44', 47', 52', 56' (4/5); Cards: Meyer Swanepoel (yellow card) 49' to 60'	Report; Scoreboard	Try: Andile Jho 37'; Con: Garrick Mattheus 38' (1/1); Pen: Garrick Mattheus 1' (1/2); Cards: Martin Bezuidenhout (yellow card) 49' to 60'	Referee: Stephan Geldenhuys

Bye/s: Golden Lions XV

=== Round Seven ===
20 May 2016	Falcons	22–24	Boland Cavaliers	Barnard Stadium, Kempton Park
15:00	Try: Shane Kirkwood 13'; Anrich Richter 45'; Etienne Taljaard 68'; Con: Karlo Aspeling 14', 46' (2/2); Warren Potgieter (0/1); Pen: Karlo Aspeling 19' (1/1)	Report; Scoreboard	Try: Ryan Nell 40', 71'; Zandré Jordaan 80'; Con: Nico Scheepers 40', 72' (2/2); Theuns Kotzé 81' (1/1); Pen: Nico Scheepers 5' (1/2)	Referee: AJ Jacobs

20 May 2016	Eastern Province Kings	15–35	Free State XV	Nelson Mandela Bay Stadium, Port Elizabeth
17:00	Try: Athi Mayinje 27'; Somila Jho 78'; Con: Michael Brink 28' (1/1); Jordan Koekemoer (0/1); Pen: Michael Brink 6' (1/2); Cards: Vukile Sofisa (yellow card) 67' to 77'	Report; Scoreboard	Try: Joseph Dweba 8', 39'; Ruan van Rensburg 17'; Tiaan Liebenberg 68'; BG Uys 72'; Con: Sias Ebersohn 9', 18', 40', 69', 73' (5/5)	Referee: Rodney Boneparte

20 May 2016	Leopards	42–17	Welwitschias	Olën Park, Potchefstroom
19:00	Try: Rowayne Beukman 4', 78'; Bruce Muller 27'; Rhyno Smith 31'; Bradley Moolman 49'; Henko Marais 56'; Con: Rhyno Smith 5', 28', 31', 50', 57', 79' (6/6); Pen: Rhyno Smith (0/1)	Report; Scoreboard	Try: Denzil van Wyk 46'; Francois Wiese 58'; Con: Shaun Kaizemi 47', 59' (2/2); Pen: Shaun Kaizemi 25' (1/1)	Referee: Sindile Ngcese

20 May 2016	Pumas	20–27	Western Province	Mbombela Stadium, Mbombela
19:00	Try: Marcello Sampson 31'; Carel Greeff 42'; Con: Justin van Staden 32', 43' (2/2); Pen: Justin van Staden 18', 36' (2/3); Cards: De-Jay Terblanche (yellow card) 22' to 34'	Report; Scoreboard	Try: JP Lewis 38', 77'; Con: Scott van Breda 78' (1/2); Pen: Scott van Breda 3', 9', 13', 23', 51' (5/6)	Referee: Marius van der Westhuizen

20 May 2016	Sharks XV	16–53	Golden Lions XV	Princess Magogo Stadium, KwaMashu
19:00	Try: Heimar Williams 6'; Con: Tristan Tedder 7' (1/1); Pen: Tristan Tedder 16', 19', 38' (3/4)	Report; Scoreboard	Try: Ramone Samuels 10'; Ruaan Lerm 23'; JW Bell 50'; Stokkies Hanekom 53'; Jarryd Sage 67'; Derick Minnie 74'; Shaun Reynolds 79'; Koch Marx 83'; Con: Marnitz Boshoff 51', 54' (2/5); Shaun Reynolds 75', 80', 84' (3/3); Pen: Marnitz Boshoff 34' (1/1)	Referee: Egon Seconds

21 May 2016	Griffons	34–23	Border Bulldogs	HT Pelatona Projects Stadium, Welkom
15:00	Try: Duan Pretorius 11'; Boela Venter 26'; Heinrich Roelfse 45'; Selvyn Davids 55'; Con: George Whitehead 12', 27', 46', 56' (4/4); Pen: George Whitehead 8', 77' (2/4)	Report; Scoreboard	Try: Siya Mdaka 5'; Nkosi Nofuma 60'; Con: Masixole Banda 6', 61' (2/2); Pen: Masixole Banda 22', 31', 33' (3/4)	Referee: Jaco Kotze

21 May 2016	Griquas	39–38	Blue Bulls	Griqua Park, Kimberley
15:00	Try: Johnathan Francke 18', 41'; Ederies Arendse 35'; Clinton Swart 70'; AJ Coertzen 76'; Con: Gouws Prinsloo 19' (1/1); André Swarts 36', 42' (2/2); Clinton Swart 71' (1/2); Pen: Gouws Prinsloo (0/3); André Swarts 39', 59' (2/2)	Report; Scoreboard	Try: Roelof Smit 14', 31', 55'; Renaldo Bothma 62'; Duncan Matthews 66'; Con: Joshua Stander 15', 32', 56', 63', 67' (5/5); Pen: Joshua Stander 46' (1/1)	Referee: Pro Legoete

Bye/s: SWD Eagles

=== Round Eight ===
27 May 2016	Boland Cavaliers	32–16	SWD Eagles	Boland Stadium, Wellington
15:00	Try: Ryan Nell 23', 46'; Shaun Adendorff 74'; Christopher Bosch 78'; Con: Theuns Kotzé 24', 75', 78' (3/4); Pen: Theuns Kotzé 40', 61' (2/2)	Report; Scoreboard	Try: Leighton Eksteen 19', 65'; Con: Tom Kean (0/1); Leighton Eksteen (0/1); Pen: Tom Kean 7' (1/1); Leighton Eksteen 58' (1/1)	Referee: AJ Jacobs

27 May 2016	Free State XV	26–29	Pumas	Free State Stadium, Bloemfontein
15:00	Try: Aranos Coetzee 10'; Tertius Kruger 19'; Lorenzo Gordon 29'; Joseph Dweba 54'; Con: Sias Ebersohn 11', 20', 30' (3/4); Cards: Tienie Burger (yellow card) 36' to 44'	Report; Scoreboard	Try: Hoffmann Maritz 17'; Jannie Stander 57'; Brian Shabangu 67'; Tyler Fisher 77'; Con: Justin van Staden 18', 68', 78' (3/4); Pen: Justin van Staden 25' (1/3)	Attendance: 372; Referee: Marius van der Westhuizen

27 May 2016	Border Bulldogs	29–24	Falcons	Buffalo City Stadium, East London
19:00	Try: Lunga Dumezweni 2'; Masixole Banda 18', 48'; Makazole Mapimpi 75'; Con: Masixole Banda 3', 49' (2/3); Logan Basson 76' (1/1); Pen: Masixole Banda 36' (1/2)	Report; Scoreboard	Try: Henri Boshoff 14'; Shane Kirkwood 45'; Christo Coetzee 68'; Con: Karlo Aspeling 15', 46' (2/2); Warren Potgieter 69' (1/1); Pen: Karlo Aspeling 28' (1/1); Drop: Warren Potgieter (0/1)	Referee: Rodney Boneparte

28 May 2016	Western Province	24–23	Griquas	Newlands Stadium, Cape Town
12:00	Try: Janco Venter 13'; Chad Solomon 44'; Khanyo Ngcukana 59'; Con: Scott van Breda 14', 45', 60' (3/3); Pen: Scott van Breda 22' (1/2)	Report; Scoreboard	Try: Jono Janse van Rensburg 29'; Tiaan Dorfling 68'; Con: André Swarts 30', 69' (2/2); Pen: André Swarts 15', 39', 55' (3/5); Cards: Wendal Wehr (yellow card) 43' to 53'; Sias Koen (yellow card) 77'; RJ Liebenberg (yellow card) 90'	Referee: Quinton Immelman

28 May 2016	Blue Bulls	26–51	Leopards	Loftus Versfeld, Pretoria
14:15	Try: Joshua Stander 25'; Renaldo Bothma 49'; Kurt Webster 81'; Hanro Liebenberg 15'; Con: Joshua Stander 26', 50', 16' (3/4); Cards: Hanro Liebenberg (yellow card) 66' to 76'	Report; Scoreboard	Try: Henko Marais 5', 45'; Marno Redelinghuys 37'; Johan Deysel 57'; Dane van der Westhuyzen 74'; Jeandré Rudolph 19'; Con: Rhyno Smith 6', 20', 38', 46', 58', 75' (6/6); Pen: Rhyno Smith 28', 43', 60' (3/5); Drop: Rhyno Smith (0/1)	Referee: Archie Sehlako

28 May 2016	Golden Lions XV	35–35	Eastern Province Kings	Pirates Rugby Club, Greenside
15:00	Try: Bobby de Wee 16'; Ruaan Lerm 24'; Ramone Samuels 63'; Ricky Schroeder 73'; Con: Shaun Reynolds 17', 25', 74' (3/4); Pen: Shaun Reynolds 32', 39', 46' (3/4); Cards: Bobby de Wee (yellow card) 51' to 61'	Report; Scoreboard	Try: Somila Jho 22' penalty try 51'; Greg Jackson 69'; JP Jonck 80'; Con: Garrick Mattheus 23', 52', 70' (3/4); Pen: Garrick Mattheus 6', 30', 57' (3/5); Cards: Sphu Msutwana (yellow card) 71'	Referee: Lourens van der Merwe

28 May 2016	Welwitschias	0–101	Griffons	Hage Geingob Stadium, Windhoek
16:00		Report; Scoreboard	Try: Selvyn Davids 8', 28'; Dirk Grobbelaar 15', 37'; Warren Williams 21', 49', 58'; Tertius Maarman 23', 32'; Neil Rautenbach 26'; Danie van der Merwe 46'; Ossie Nortjé 71'; De Wet Kruger 74'; Boela Venter 78', 80'; Con: George Whitehead 16', 22', 24', 27', 29', 33', 38', 47', 59', 72', 75', 79', 81' (13/15)	Referee: Pro Legoete

Bye/s: Sharks XV

=== Round Nine ===
3 June 2016	Eastern Province Kings	26–34	Sharks XV	Nelson Mandela Bay Stadium, Port Elizabeth
19:00	Try: Garrick Mattheus 12'; Franswa Ueckermann 69'; Con: Garrick Mattheus 13', 70' (2/2); Pen: Garrick Mattheus 2', 18', 26', 43' (4/5); Cards: Martin Bezuidenhout (yellow card) 39' to 49'	Report; Scoreboard	Try: Khaya Majola 20'; Ruan Botha 28'; Heimar Williams 46'; Alrin Eksteen 49'; Wandile Mjekevu 75'; Con: Marcel Coetzee 29', 50', 76' (3/5); Pen: Marcel Coetzee 16' (1/3)	Referee: Marius van der Westhuizen

4 June 2016	Griffons	28–57	Blue Bulls	HT Pelatona Projects Stadium, Welkom
15:00	Try: Thato Mavundla 3'; Heinrich Roelfse 19'; Danie van der Merwe 32', 47'; Con: George Whitehead 4', 20', 33', 48' (4/4); Pen: George Whitehead (0/1); Cards: Vincent Maruping (yellow card) 74'	Report; Scoreboard	Try: Corniel Els 13'; Alcino Izaacs 25'; Roelof Smit 29', 45'; Kefentse Mahlo 38', 42'; Marquit September 60'; Theo Maree 76'; Con: Joshua Stander 26' (1/2); Divan Rossouw 30' (1/1); Kurt Webster 39', 43', 46', 61', 77' (5/5); Pen: Kurt Webster 73' (1/2)	Attendance: 300; Referee: Ben Crouse

4 June 2016	Pumas	35–24	Golden Lions XV	KaNyamazane
15:00	Try: Reynier van Rooyen 14'; Bernado Botha 26'; Frank Herne 54'; Heinrich Steyl 58'; Con: Heinrich Steyl 15', 27', 55' (3/4); Pen: Heinrich Steyl 5', 25', 36' (3/4)	Report; Scoreboard	Try: Anthony Volmink 10'; Ruaan Lerm 18'; Fabian Booysen 47'; Shaun Reynolds 73'; Con: Ashlon Davids 11', 48' (2/4)	Referee: Jaco van Heerden

4 June 2016	Griquas	44–31	Free State XV	Griqua Park, Kimberley
17:05	Try: penalty try 20'; Tiaan Dorfling 38'; Ederies Arendse 42'; Devon Martinus 76'; AJ Coertzen 78'; Con: André Swarts 21', 39', 43' (3/3); Clinton Swart 77', 79' (2/2); Pen: André Swarts 9', 24', 48' (3/3)	Report; Scoreboard	Try: Tertius Kruger 5'; Carl Wegner 30'; Reniel Hugo 56'; Reinhardt Erwee 82'; Con: Niel Marais 6', 31', 57', 83' (4/4); Pen: Niel Marais 72' (1/3)	Referee: Rasta Rasivhenge

4 June 2016	Leopards	34–43	Western Province	Olën Park, Potchefstroom
19:10	Try: Rhyno Smith 2', 57'; Marno Redelinghuys 50'; Jaco Hayward 74'; Con: Rhyno Smith 3', 51', 58', 75' (4/4); Pen: Rhyno Smith 5' (1/2); Drop: Rhyno Smith 18' (1/2); Cards: Henko Marais (yellow card) 11' to 22'	Report; Scoreboard	Try: Beyers de Villiers 8'; Khanyo Ngcukana 14'; Grant Hermanus 19', 40'; Freddie Muller 47'; Jean Kleyn 70'; Con: Scott van Breda 9', 15', 20', 40', 71' (5/6); Pen: Scott van Breda 32' (1/2)	Referee: Egon Seconds

Bye/s: Boland Cavaliers, Border Bulldogs, Falcons, SWD Eagles, Welwitschias

=== Round Ten ===
10 June 2016	Blue Bulls	22–18	Sharks XV	Loftus Versfeld, Pretoria
17:00	Try: Marquit September 13', 61'; Kefentse Mahlo 54', 67'; Con: Kurt Webster 14' (1/2); Tony Jantjies (0/2); Cards: Marvin Orie (yellow card) 82'	Report; Scoreboard	Try: Morné Joubert 26'; S'bura Sithole 52'; Con: Marcel Coetzee (0/1); Duncan Campbell 53' (1/1); Pen: Marcel Coetzee 7', 17' (2/3); Duncan Campbell (0/1); Cards: Christiaan de Bruin (yellow card) 61' to 71'	Referee: Egon Seconds

10 June 2016	SWD Eagles	39–22	Border Bulldogs	Outeniqua Park, George
19:00	Try: Janneman Stander 39'; Peet van der Walt 42'; Mark Pretorius 49'; Christo du Plessis 68'; Daniel Roberts 78'; Con: Tom Kean 40', 43', 69', 79' (4/5); Pen: Tom Kean 2', 76' (2/2); Cards: Lodewyk Uys (yellow card) 15' to 25'; Lenes Nomdo (yellow card) 64' to 75'	Report; Scoreboard	Try: Masixole Banda 35'; Logan Basson 65'; Mihlali Mpafi 73'; Michael Makase 74'; Con: Masixole Banda 75' (1/4); Pen: Masixole Banda (0/2); Cards: Lindokuhle Welemu (yellow card) 39' to 50'	Referee: Marius van der Westhuizen

11 June 2016	Falcons	66–5	Welwitschias	Barnard Stadium, Kempton Park
14:10	Try: Reg Muller 6', 36', 70'; Etienne Taljaard 17'; Kyle Hendricks 27'; Andries Truter 31', 67'; Andrew van Wyk 45'; Marlyn Williams 52'; Karlo Aspeling 60'; Con: Karlo Aspeling 7', 18', 28', 32', 37', 53', 61' (7/8); Kyle Hendricks (0/1); Andries Truter 71' (1/1)	Report; Scoreboard	Try: Lesley Klim 40'; Con: Aurelio Plato (0/1)	Referee: Rodney Boneparte

11 June 2016	Golden Lions XV	52–37	Griquas	Johannesburg Police Rugby Club, Emmarentia
15:00	Try: Stokkies Hanekom 9', 14', 62'; Shaun Reynolds 22'; Marnitz Boshoff 46'; JW Bell 73', 79'; Con: Marnitz Boshoff 10', 15', 23', 47', 63', 74', 80' (7/7); Pen: Marnitz Boshoff 66' (1/2)	Report; Scoreboard	Try: Alshaun Bock 18', 34'; AJ Coertzen 31'; Stephan Kotzé 41'; Con: André Swarts 19', 32', 35', 42' (4/4); Pen: André Swarts 45', 54', 68' (3/4)	Referee: Quinton Immelman

Bye/s: Boland Cavaliers, Eastern Province Kings, Free State XV, Griffons, Leopards, Pumas, Western Province

=== Round Eleven ===
16 June 2016	Border Bulldogs	17–38	Boland Cavaliers	Buffalo City Stadium, East London
15:00	Try: Billy Dutton 22' penalty try 64'; Makazole Mapimpi 74'; Con: Masixole Banda (0/1); Logan Basson 65' (1/2)	Report; Scoreboard	Try: Shaun Adendorff 16'; Ryan Nell 31'; Chadley Wenn 46', 55'; Francois Hanekom 70'; Con: Nico Scheepers 17', 32', 47', 56', 71' (5/5); Pen: Nico Scheepers 11' (1/1)	Referee: Quinton Immelman

17 June 2016	Blue Bulls	42–15	Falcons	Loftus Versfeld, Pretoria
17:00	Try: Tony Jantjies 9', 14'; Dan Kriel 19'; André Warner 21'; Nqoba Mxoli 37'; Ivan van Zyl 54'; Con: Tony Jantjies 10', 15', 20', 22', 38', 55' (6/6); Pen: Tony Jantjies (0/1); Cards: Marquit September (yellow card) 64' to 74'; Ruan Steenkamp (yellow card) 66' to 76'	Report; Scoreboard	Try: Coert Cronjé 6'; Andrew van Wyk 73'; Con: Karlo Aspeling 7' (1/2); Pen: Karlo Aspeling 12' (1/1)	Referee: AJ Jacobs

17 June 2016	Free State XV	23–14	Leopards	Free State Stadium, Bloemfontein
17:00	Try: Fiffy Rampeta 9'; Reniel Hugo 59'; Con: Niel Marais 10', 60' (2/2); Pen: Niel Marais 40', 54' (2/3); JP Smith 79' (1/1)	Report; Scoreboard	Try: Jaco Hayward 12'; Con: Rhyno Smith (0/1); Pen: Rhyno Smith 7', 21', 70' (3/3)	Referee: Rodney Boneparte

18 June 2016	Welwitschias	5–96	SWD Eagles	Hage Geingob Stadium, Windhoek
16:00	Try: Lesley Klim 7'; Con: Aurelio Plato (0/1); Cards: Hauta Veii (yellow card) 28' to 38'	Report; Scoreboard	Try: Thor Halvorsen 3'; Lodewyk Uys 19'; Daniel Roberts 21', 77'; Martin du Toit 23', 36', 73'; Kurt Haupt 28'; Janneman Stander 33'; Jacquin Jansen 45'; Wilneth Engelbrecht 59'; Christo du Plessis 66'; Layle Delo 70'; Andisa Ntsila 79'; Con: Jacquin Jansen 4', 20', 22', 24', 34', 37', 46' (7/8); Hansie Graaff 60', 67' (2/2); Tom Kean 71', 74', 78', 80' (4/4); Cards: Andisa Ntsila (yellow card) 51' to 61'; Janneman Stander (yellow card) 53' to 65'	Referee: Francois Pretorius

18 June 2016	Western Province	43–26	Griffons	Faure Street Stadium, Paarl
16:00	Try: Jaco Taute 2', 41'; Chad Solomon 6'; Eital Bredenkamp 26'; EW Viljoen 57', 61'; Justin Phillips 76'; Con: Robert du Preez 3', 42', 58', 62' (4/7); Cards: Grant Hermanus (yellow card) 78'	Report; Scoreboard	Try: De Wet Kruger 68'; Danie van der Merwe 79'; Con: George Whitehead 69', 80' (2/2); Pen: George Whitehead 17', 19', 37' (3/3); Drop: George Whitehead 29' (1/1)	Referee: Sindile Ngcese

18 June 2016	Sharks XV	13–35	Pumas	Arbor Park, Newcastle
17:00	Try: Khulu Marwana 48'; Con: Tristan Tedder 49' (1/1); Pen: Tristan Tedder 23', 38' (2/2)	Report; Scoreboard	Try: Hoffmann Maritz 11'; Reynier van Rooyen 14'; Nardus van der Walt 28'; Lambert Groenewald 69'; Jacques Kotzé 78'; Con: Justin van Staden 12', 15', 29', 70', 79' (5/5); Pen: Justin van Staden (0/1)	Referee: Egon Seconds

Bye/s: Eastern Province Kings, Golden Lions XV, Griquas

=== Round Twelve ===
24 June 2016	Falcons	31–59	Western Province	Barnard Stadium, Kempton Park
15:00	Try: Shane Kirkwood 4'; Grant Janke 10'; Andries Truter 70'; Marlyn Williams 79'; Con: Karlo Aspeling 5', 11' (2/2); JP du Plessis 71' (1/1); Christo Coetzee 80' (1/1); Pen: Karlo Aspeling 28' (1/1)	Report; Scoreboard	Try: Khanyo Ngcukana 13'; JP Lewis 24', 39', 46'; Chad Solomon 37'; Robert du Preez 50'; Eital Bredenkamp 59'; Devon Williams 65'; Cullen Collopy 74'; Con: Robert du Preez 14', 38', 40', 47', 51', 60', 75' (7/9)	Attendance: 1,000; Referee: Quinton Immelman

24 June 2016	Leopards	28–64	Golden Lions XV	Olën Park, Potchefstroom
15:00	Try: Bradley Moolman 4'; Malherbe Swart 60'; Jaco Hayward 64'; Wilmar Arnoldi 70'; Con: Rhyno Smith 5', 61', 65', 71' (4/4); Cards: Wilmar Arnoldi (yellow card) 32' to 42'	Report; Scoreboard	Try: Jacques van Rooyen 14'; Jarryd Sage 22'; Ramone Samuels 27'; Cyle Brink 37'; Sylvian Mahuza 50'; Ruan Ackermann 55'; Lourens Erasmus 57', 72'; Rohan Janse van Rensburg 76'; Anthony Volmink 78'; Con: Marnitz Boshoff 15', 28', 38', 56', 58', 73', 77' (7/10); Cards: Sylvian Mahuza (yellow card) 68' to 79'	Referee: Stuart Berry

24 June 2016	Pumas	53–20	Eastern Province Kings	Mbombela Stadium, Mbombela
17:00	Try: Frank Herne 10', 18'; De-Jay Terblanche 32'; Lambert Groenewald 38', 62'; Brian Shabangu 55'; Reuben Johannes 69'; Deon Helberg 75'; Con: Justin van Staden 11', 19', 39', 70', 76' (5/8); Pen: Justin van Staden 14' (1/1); Cards: Reynier van Rooyen (yellow card) 41' to 51'	Report; Scoreboard	Try: Yaw Penxe 1'; Somila Jho 42'; Courtney Winnaar 59'; Con: Michael Brink 44' (1/3); Pen: Michael Brink 24' (1/1); Cards: Warrick Venter (yellow card) 23' to 33'; Courtney Winnaar (yellow card) 36' to 45'	Referee: Lourens van der Merwe

24 June 2016	SWD Eagles	23–28	Blue Bulls	Outeniqua Park, George
19:00	Try: Layle Delo 25'; Lyndon Hartnick 42'; Kurt Haupt 50'; Con: Jacquin Jansen 26' (1/2); Hansie Graaff (0/1); Pen: Jacquin Jansen 34' (1/1); Hansie Graaff (0/1); Tom Kean 73' (1/1)	Report; Scoreboard	Try: Ruben van Heerden 29'; Divan Rossouw 31'; Alandré van Rooyen 62'; Con: Tony Jantjies 30' (1/1); Tinus de Beer 63' (1/1); Pen: Tony Jantjies 7', 15', 37' (3/4)	Referee: Sindile Ngcese

25 June 2016	Griffons	49–33	Free State XV	HT Pelatona Projects Stadium, Welkom
14:10	Try: Warren Williams 13', 55' penalty try 20'; Japie Nel 33', 65'; Vuyo Mbotho 79'; Con: George Whitehead 14', 21', 34', 66', 80' (5/6); Pen: George Whitehead 26', 48' (2/2); Drop: George Whitehead 39' (1/1)	Report; Scoreboard	Try: Tertius Kruger 5'; Fiffy Rampeta 28'; Reinhardt Erwee 43', 71'; Jacques du Toit 50'; Con: Sias Ebersohn 29', 44', 51' (3/4); Darren Baron 72' (1/1); Cards: Maphutha Dolo (yellow card) 20' to 31'	Attendance: 3,500; Referee: Pro Legoete

25 June 2016	Boland Cavaliers	110–10	Welwitschias	Boland Stadium, Wellington
15:00	Try: Nico Scheepers 3', 15', 72'; Ryan Nell 8', 37', 43', 54'; Hanno Kitshoff 12'; Kenan Cronjé 26'; Christopher Bosch 35', 46', 60', 78'; Sergio Torrens 65', 81'; William van Wyk 76'; Con: Nico Scheepers 9', 13', 16', 27', 36', 38', 44', 47', 55', 61', 66', 73', 77', 79', 82' (15/16)	Report; Scoreboard	Try: Philip Nashikaku 32'; Malcolm Moore 39'; Con: Aurelio Plato (0/1); Justin Nel (0/1)	Referee: AJ Jacobs

25 June 2016	Griquas	36–14	Sharks XV	Mxolisi Dicky Jacobs Stadium, Upington
15:00	Try: Ntabeni Dukisa 15'; AJ le Roux 31'; Ederies Arendse 52'; Sias Koen 60'; JW Jonker 69'; Con: Clinton Swart 16', 32', 53', 61' (4/4); André Swarts (0/1); Pen: Clinton Swart 64' (1/2)	Report; Scoreboard	Try: Khaya Majola 37'; Marius Louw 75'; Con: Tristan Tedder 38' (1/1); Morné Joubert 76' (1/1)	Attendance: 6,000; Referee: Jaco van Heerden

Bye/s: Border Bulldogs

=== Round Thirteen ===
1 July 2016	Sharks XV	26–23	Leopards	Durban Crusaders RC, Durban
18:00	Try: Neil Maritz 30'; Khulu Marwana 34'; David McDuling 57'; Inny Radebe 65'; Con: Inny Radebe 31', 35', 66' (3/4); Cards: Khulu Marwana (yellow card) 46' to 57'	Report; Scoreboard	Try: Jaco Jordaan 38'; Rowayne Beukman 70'; Benhard Janse van Rensburg 72'; Con: Benhard Janse van Rensburg 39' (1/3); Pen: Benhard Janse van Rensburg 4', 15' (2/2)	Referee: Rodney Boneparte

1 July 2016	Blue Bulls	26–35	Boland Cavaliers	Loftus Versfeld, Pretoria
19:00	Try: Hanro Liebenberg 22', 65'; Divan Rossouw 59'; André Warner 68'; Con: Tony Jantjies 23' (1/1); Joshua Stander 66', 69' (2/3)	Report; Scoreboard	Try: Danwel Demas 40'; Sergio Torrens 44', 76'; Basil Short 55'; Con: Nico Scheepers 40', 45', 77' (3/4); Pen: Nico Scheepers 30', 38', 43' (3/3); Drop: Adriaan Carelse (0/1); Nico Scheepers (0/1); Cards: Shaun Adendorff (yellow card) 90'	Attendance: 580; Referee: Quinton Immelman

2 July 2016	Free State XV	33–27	Falcons	Free State Stadium, Bloemfontein
12:15	Try: Tertius Kruger 32'; JP Coetzee 41'; Reinhardt Erwee 66'; Ntokozo Vidima 67'; Ali Mgijima 78'; Con: Sias Ebersohn 42', 67', 68', 79' (4/5)	Report; Scoreboard	Try: Grant Janke 23'; Dwight Pansegrouw 54'; Etienne Taljaard 71'; Con: Warren Potgieter 24', 55', 72' (3/3); Pen: Warren Potgieter 10', 47' (2/2)	Referee: AJ Jacobs

2 July 2016	Golden Lions XV	66–19	Griffons	Ellis Park Stadium, Johannesburg
14:10	Try: Jacques Nel 1'; Stokkies Hanekom 7', 41'; Clinton Theron 12'; Ruaan Lerm 18', 44'; Stephan de Wit 21'; Koch Marx 60'; Jarryd Sage 73'; JW Bell 76'; Con: Marnitz Boshoff 2', 8', 19', 22' (4/5); Ashlon Davids 42', 61', 74', 77' (4/5)	Report; Scoreboard	Try: Vuyo Mbotho 3'; Selvyn Davids 68', 80'; Con: Selvyn Davids (0/1); Colin Herbert 69', 80' (2/2); Cards: Khwezi Mkhafu (yellow card) 11'	Referee: Pro Legoete

2 July 2016	Eastern Province Kings	12–29	Griquas	Nelson Mandela Bay Stadium, Port Elizabeth
16:00	Try: Lusanda Badiyana 52'; JP Jamieson 79'; Con: Garrick Mattheus 53' (1/2); Drop: Garrick Mattheus (0/1); Cards: Cornell Hess (yellow card) 18' to 28'	Report; Scoreboard	Try: Ntabeni Dukisa 4', 32'; Alshaun Bock 23'; André Swarts 58'; Con: André Swarts 24', 33', 59' (3/4); Pen: André Swarts 19' (1/1)	Referee: Jaco van Heerden

2 July 2016	Welwitschias	18–76	Border Bulldogs	Hage Geingob Stadium, Windhoek
16:00	Try: Mahco Prinsloo 38'; Philip Nashikaku 59'; Con: Riaan van Zyl 39' (1/2); Pen: Riaan van Zyl 3', 17' (2/2); Cards: Russell van Wyk (yellow card) 65'	Report; Scoreboard	Try: Makazole Mapimpi 12', 19', 48', 80'; Johannes Jonker 31'; Logan Basson 46'; Sonwabiso Mqalo 51', 66'; Athenkosi Khethani 63', 72'; Michael Makase 74'; Nkululeko Ndlovu 76'; Con: Masixole Banda 13' (1/2); Logan Basson 32', 47', 49', 64', 73', 77', 81' (7/10)	Referee: Egon Seconds

2 July 2016	Western Province	45–17	SWD Eagles	City Park Stadium, Athlone
16:00	Try: Johnny Kôtze 11'; Chad Solomon 14'; Rabz Maxwane 38'; Tim Whitehead 58'; Luke Stringer 66'; Chris van Zyl 79'; Con: Robert du Preez 12', 15', 39', 59', 67', 80' (6/6); Pen: Robert du Preez 49' (1/1)	Report; Scoreboard	Try: Daniel Roberts 23'; Kurt Haupt 44'; Con: Jacquin Jansen 24', 45' (2/2); Pen: Jacquin Jansen 54' (1/1)	Referee: Ben Crouse

Bye/s: Pumas

=== Round Fourteen ===
7 July 2016	Griquas	37–14	Pumas	Griqua Park, Kimberley
19:00	Try: Christiaan Meyer 10'; AJ Coertzen 24', 77'; Ntabeni Dukisa 31'; Mzwanele Zito 45'; Con: Clinton Swart 25', 46', 78' (3/5); Pen: Clinton Swart 40', 50' (2/2); Drop: Clinton Swart (0/1); Cards: Christiaan Meyer (yellow card) 28' to 38'; Jonathan Adendorf (yellow card) 68' to 78'	Report; Scoreboard	Try: Carel Greeff 69'; Heinrich Steyl 72'; Con: Justin van Staden 70', 72' (2/2); Pen: Justin van Staden (0/1); Cards: Khwezi Mona (yellow card) 38' to 48'; Nardus van der Walt (yellow card) 50' to 58'	Referee: Rasta Rasivhenge

8 July 2016	Leopards	54–14	Eastern Province Kings	Olën Park, Potchefstroom
15:00	Try: Jaco Hayward 2', 5'; Rowayne Beukman 16'; Gene Willemse 35'; Benhard Janse van Rensburg 47'; Juan Language 51', 79'; Ryno Wepener 69'; Con: Benhard Janse van Rensburg 3', 6', 17', 36', 48' (5/6); Schalk Hugo 70', 80' (2/2)	Report; Scoreboard	Try: Tazz Fuzani 21'; JP Jonck 57'; Con: Garrick Mattheus 22' (1/1); Simon Bolze 58' (1/1); Pen: Garrick Mattheus (0/1); Cards: Wihan Coetzer (yellow card) 67' to 77'	Referee: Juan Sylvestre

8 July 2016	SWD Eagles	16–24	Free State XV	Outeniqua Park, George
19:00	Try: Johan Steyn 4'; Con: Hansie Graaff 5' (1/1); Pen: Hansie Graaff 1', 39' (2/2); Tom Kean 62' (1/1); Cards: Johan Steyn (yellow card) 36' to 46'	Report; Scoreboard	Try: Tienie Burger 37'; Mosolwa Mafuma 49'; Con: Sias Ebersohn 50' (1/2); Pen: Sias Ebersohn 2', 3', 51', 71' (4/4); Cards: Justin Basson (yellow card) 48'	Referee: Pro Legoete

9 July 2016	Falcons	14–75	Golden Lions XV	Barnard Stadium, Kempton Park
15:00	Try: Christian Rust 21'; Barend Steyn 60'; Con: Warren Potgieter 22' (1/1); Christo Coetzee 61' (1/1); Cards: JP du Plessis (yellow card) 69'	Report; Scoreboard	Try: Selom Gavor 5', 27'; Anthony Volmink 19', 36', 47'; JW Bell 23'; Shaun Reynolds 51'; Clinton Theron 59'; Jacques Nel 66'; MB Lusaseni 73'; Pieter Jansen 79'; Con: Jaco van der Walt 6', 20', 24', 28' (4/4); Shaun Reynolds 37', 52', 60', 67', 74', 80' (6/7)	Referee: Ben Crouse

9 July 2016	Griffons	27–36	Sharks XV	HT Pelatona Projects Stadium, Welkom
15:00	Try: Japie Nel 5', 52'; Warren Williams 7'; Gavin Annandale 69'; Con: Duan Pretorius 6', 53' (2/4); Pen: Duan Pretorius 35' (1/1)	Report; Scoreboard	Try: Neil Maritz 24'; Stephan Coetzee 47'; Morné Joubert 62'; Malcolm Cele 66', 75'; Con: Inny Radebe 25', 48', 63', 67' (4/5); Pen: Duncan Campbell 79' (1/1)	Referee: Jaco Peyper

9 July 2016	Boland Cavaliers	14–25	Western Province	Piketberg
16:00	Try: Christopher Bosch 20'; Danwel Demas 44'; Con: Nico Scheepers 21', 45' (2/2); Pen: Nico Scheepers (0/1)	Report; Scoreboard	Try: Robert du Preez 32'; Chad Solomon 38'; EW Viljoen 69'; Con: Robert du Preez 39', 70' (2/3); Pen: Robert du Preez 27', 42' (2/2); Cards: Godlen Masimla (yellow card) 18' to 28'	Referee: Rodney Boneparte

9 July 2016	Border Bulldogs	26–45	Blue Bulls	Buffalo City Stadium, East London
17:00	Try: Sipho Nofemele 11'; Michael Makase 41'; Con: Logan Basson 12', 42' (2/2); Pen: Logan Basson 26', 35', 52', 55' (4/4); Cards: Makazole Mapimpi (yellow card) 68' to 78'	Report; Scoreboard	Try: Marquit September 17', 59'; Jade Stighling 23'; Tapiwa Tsomondo 32', 69'; Franco Naudé 44'; Kefentse Mahlo 75'; Con: Joshua Stander 18', 24', 33', 45', 70' (5/7)	Referee: Cwengile Jadezweni

Bye/s: Welwitschias

=== Round Fifteen ===
15 July 2016	Eastern Province Kings	24–32	Griffons	Nelson Mandela Bay Stadium, Port Elizabeth
15:00	Try: penalty try 38'; Lindelwe Zungu 51'; Garrick Mattheus 76'; Con: Simon Bolze 39', 52' (2/2); Garrick Mattheus 77' (1/1); Pen: Simon Bolze 8' (1/1)	Report; Scoreboard	Try: Selvyn Davids 22', 78'; Warren Williams 33'; Japie Nel 64'; Con: Duan Pretorius 23', 34', 65' (3/4); Pen: Duan Pretorius 1', 18' (2/2); Cards: Selvyn Davids (yellow card) 39' to 49'	Referee: Pro Legoete

15 July 2016	Sharks XV	10–26	Falcons	Kings Park Stadium, Durban
16:15	Try: Stephan Coetzee 67'; Con: Inny Radebe 68' (1/1); Pen: Inny Radebe 25' (1/1); Cards: David McDuling (yellow card) 40' to 50'	Report; Scoreboard	Try: Christian Rust 20', 40'; Dean Muir 77'; Thabo Mamojele 79'; Con: Warren Potgieter 21', 78', 79' (3/4)	Referee: Juan Sylvestre

15 July 2016	Blue Bulls	95–12	Welwitschias	Loftus Versfeld, Pretoria
17:00	Try: Jade Stighling 4', 18', 50', 53'; Alcino Izaacs 7', 73'; André Warner 13'; Tapiwa Tsomondo 20'; Divan Rossouw 30'; Freddy Ngoza 48'; Abongile Nonkontwana 66'; Tony Jantjies 57'; Marquit September 62', 78'; Joshua Stander 74'; Con: Tony Jantjies 5', 8', 14', 31', 51', 54', 58' (7/10); Joshua Stander 74', 75', 79' (3/5)	Report; Scoreboard	Try: Johann Wohler 38'; Riaan van Zyl 76'; Con: Riaan van Zyl (0/1); Shaun Kaizemi 77' (1/1); Cards: Malcolm Moore (yellow card) 51' to 62'	Referee: Rodney Boneparte

15 July 2016	Pumas	29–27	Leopards	Mbombela Stadium, Mbombela
19:00	Try: De-Jay Terblanche 15'; Carel Greeff 26', 57'; Tyler Fisher 47'; François du Toit 79'; Con: Devon Williams 16' (1/2); Justin van Staden 58' (1/3)	Report; Scoreboard	Try: Loftus Morrison 22', 68'; Jaco Hayward 44', 50'; Con: Schalk Hugo 23' (1/2); Gene Willemse (0/1); Malherbe Swart 69' (1/1); Pen: Schalk Hugo 6' (1/1); Cards: Lucky Ngcamu (yellow card) 34' to 44'	Referee: Jaco van Heerden

16 July 2016	Western Province	52–26	Border Bulldogs	Newlands Stadium, Cape Town
14:15	Try: Tim Whitehead 3'; Chad Solomon 24'; Godlen Masimla 40'; Edwill van der Merwe 53', 66'; Cullen Collopy 60'; Grant Hermanus 63'; Justin Phillips 76'; Con: Grant Hermanus 4', 62', 64', 67', 77' (5/7); Dennis Cox 25' (1/1)	Report; Scoreboard	Try: Lunga Dumezweni 20'; Sonwabiso Mqalo 49'; Con: Masixole Banda 21', 50' (2/2); Pen: Masixole Banda 5', 32', 37', 58' (4/4); Cards: Lindokuhle Welemu (yellow card) 59' to 70'; Siya Mdaka (yellow card) 74'	Referee: Pierre Brousset

16 July 2016	Golden Lions XV	35–29	SWD Eagles	Ellis Park Stadium, Johannesburg
15:00	Try: Jo-Hanko de Villiers 17'; James Venter 42'; JW Bell 51'; Godfrey Ramaboea 77'; Con: Siya Masuku 18', 52', 78' (3/4); Pen: Siya Masuku 35', 65', 72' (3/3)	Report; Scoreboard	Try: Kurt Haupt 12'; Kirsten Heyns 56'; Buran Parks 75'; Mark Pretorius 80'; Con: Hansie Graaff 57', 76' (2/3); Tom Kean 81' (1/1); Pen: Hansie Graaff 5' (1/1)	Referee: Cwengile Jadezweni

16 July 2016	Free State XV	17–24	Boland Cavaliers	Free State Stadium, Bloemfontein
16:15	Try: Carel-Jan Coetzee 14'; Lorenzo Gordon 52'; Con: Sias Ebersohn 15', 53' (2/2); Pen: Sias Ebersohn 49' (1/2)	Report; Scoreboard	Try: Christopher Bosch 68', 76'; Danwel Demas 71'; Con: Nico Scheepers 69', 72', 77' (3/3); Pen: Nico Scheepers 7' (1/1)	Attendance: 200; Referee: AJ Jacobs

Bye/s: Griquas

=== Round Sixteen ===
22 July 2016	Falcons	59–26	Eastern Province Kings	Barnard Stadium, Kempton Park
15:00	Try: Grant Janke 9', 67'; Etienne Taljaard 13', 80'; Shane Kirkwood 24'; Andries Schutte 34'; Johan Pretorius 49', 52'; Karlo Aspeling 76'; Con: Warren Potgieter 10', 25', 35' (3/4); Karlo Aspeling 53', 68', 77', 81' (4/5); Cards: Ernst Ladendorf (yellow card) 57' to 67'; Etienne Taljaard (yellow card) 69' to 79'	Report; Scoreboard	Try: Keanu Vers 18'; David Murray 38'; Lusanda Badiyana 41'; Franswa Ueckermann 57'; Con: Simon Bolze 19', 39', 58' (3/4)	Referee: Marius van der Westhuizen

22 July 2016	Border Bulldogs	18–22	Free State XV	Buffalo City Stadium, East London
19:00	Try: Sethu Tom 20'; Makazole Mapimpi 48'; Con: Masixole Banda 21' (1/2); Pen: Masixole Banda 33', 40' (2/3); Cards: Nkosi Nofuma (yellow card) 3'	Report; Scoreboard	Try: Nardus Erasmus 8' penalty try 36'; Neil Rautenbach 58'; Con: Gerrie Labuschagné 9', 37' (2/3); Pen: Ruan van Rensburg 68' (1/1)	Referee: Lourens van der Merwe

22 July 2016	Leopards	37–17	Griquas	Olën Park, Potchefstroom
19:00	Try: Bradley Moolman 17'; Bart le Roux 26'; Wilmar Arnoldi 40'; Henko Marais 73'; Johan Deysel 81'; Con: Malherbe Swart (0/1); Rhyno Smith 27', 40', 74' (3/4); Pen: Rhyno Smith 34', 66' (2/4)	Report; Scoreboard	Try: Jason Fraser 67', 80'; Con: André Swarts 68', 80' (2/2); Pen: Steven Moir 12' (1/1); Cards: Steph Vermeulen (yellow card) 47' to 58'	Referee: Egon Seconds

22 July 2016	SWD Eagles	24–29	Sharks XV	Outeniqua Park, George
19:00	Try: Dean Hopp 14'; Lodewyk Uys 22'; Mark Pretorius 48'; Clinton Wagman 77'; Con: Tom Kean 23', 49' (2/4)	Report; Scoreboard	Try: Johan du Toit 9'; Hanco Venter 16', 55'; Gerhard Engelbrecht 25'; Con: Inny Radebe 17', 26', 56' (3/4); Pen: Inny Radebe 51' (1/2); Cards: Kerron van Vuuren (yellow card) 43' to 53'	Referee: Sindile Ngcese

23 July 2016	Griffons	17–60	Pumas	HT Pelatona Projects Stadium, Welkom
14:30	Try: De Wet Kruger 14'; Selvyn Davids 76'; Con: George Whitehead 15', 77' (2/2); Pen: George Whitehead 30' (1/1); Cards: Khwezi Mkhafu (yellow card) 35' to 45' (red card) 66'	Report; Scoreboard	Try: Leighton van Wyk 22'; Jacques Kotzé 37'; Tyler Fisher 39', 72'; Marlou van Niekerk 53'; JP Lewis 55', 59'; Frank Herne 66'; Damien Jansen van Rensburg 69'; Con: Justin van Staden 23', 40', 54' (3/5); Marlou van Niekerk 60' (1/1); Leighton van Wyk 67', 70' (2/3); Pen: Justin van Staden 7' (1/1); Cards: Hugo Kloppers (yellow card) 78'	Referee: Rodney Boneparte

23 July 2016	Boland Cavaliers	28–24	Golden Lions XV	Grabouw High School, Grabouw
15:00	Try: Chadley Wenn 18'; Sergio Torrens 25'; Shaun McDonald 35'; Robbie Louw 58'; Con: Nico Scheepers 19', 26', 36', 59' (4/4); Pen: Nico Scheepers (0/3); Cards: Danwel Demas (yellow card) 72'	Report; Scoreboard	Try: Jacques Nel 8'; Victor Sekekete 11', 44'; Con: Shaun Reynolds 9', 12', 45' (3/3); Pen: Shaun Reynolds 22' (1/1)	Referee: Pierre Brousset

23 July 2016	Welwitschias	7–71	Western Province	Hage Geingob Stadium, Windhoek
16:00	Try: Mahco Prinsloo 15'; Con: Justin Nel 16' (1/1); Cards: Cameron Klassen (yellow card) 70'; Heinrich Smit (yellow card) 78'	Report; Scoreboard	Try: Dennis Cox 2'; Kobus van Dyk 9', 38'; Justin Phillips 18'; EW Viljoen 21', 80'; Eital Bredenkamp 42'; Christo van der Merwe 45'; Beyers de Villiers 55'; Scott van Breda 61'; Khanyo Ngcukana 73'; Con: Grant Hermanus 10', 19', 39', 43', 46', 56', 62', 74' (8/11); Cards: Christo van der Merwe (yellow card) 72'	Referee: Archie Sehlako

Bye/s: Blue Bulls

== Players ==
=== Player statistics ===
The top ten points scorers during the 2016 Currie Cup qualification series were: (Note: All points scored in the Welwitschias v Western Province match in Round Sixteen are missing from the top scorers list.)

Top Ten points scorers
No	Player	Team	T	C	P	DG	Pts
1	George Whitehead	Griffons	3	50	15	2	166
2	Rhyno Smith	Leopards	5	33	17	2	148
3	Nico Scheepers	Boland Cavaliers	5	41	11	0	140
4	Justin van Staden	Pumas	0	30	19	0	117
5	Clinton Swart	Griquas	4	22	10	0	94
6	Shaun Reynolds	Golden Lions XV	5	24	6	0	91
7	Karlo Aspeling	Falcons	2	25	10	0	90
8	Masixole Banda	Border Bulldogs	4	15	12	0	86
9	Marnitz Boshoff	Golden Lions XV	1	29	6	0	81
10	Selvyn Davids	Griffons	16	0	0	0	80

Other points scorers
No	Player	Team	T	C	P	DG	Pts
11	André Swarts	Griquas	2	16	12	0	78
12	Joshua Stander	Blue Bulls	3	25	4	0	77
13	Sias Ebersohn	Free State XV	1	26	6	0	75
14	Scott van Breda	Western Province	3	17	7	0	70
15	Tristan Tedder	Sharks XV	2	14	10	0	68
16	Hansie Graaff	SWD Eagles	0	15	12	0	66
16	Garrick Mattheus	Eastern Province Kings	2	10	12	0	66
18	Tony Jantjies	Blue Bulls	3	16	6	0	65
18	Makazole Mapimpi	Border Bulldogs	13	0	0	0	65
20	Ryan Nell	Boland Cavaliers	12	0	0	0	60
21	Grant Hermanus	Western Province	3	16	4	0	59
22	Robert du Preez	Western Province	2	19	3	0	57
23	AJ Coertzen	Griquas	11	0	0	0	55
24	Tom Kean	SWD Eagles	0	14	8	0	52
25	Christopher Bosch	Boland Cavaliers	10	0	0	0	50
25	Warren Williams	Griffons	10	0	0	0	50
27	Inny Radebe	Sharks XV	1	14	5	0	48
28	Theuns Kotzé	Boland Cavaliers	1	12	6	0	47
29	Logan Basson	Border Bulldogs	2	12	4	0	46
30	Etienne Taljaard	Falcons	9	0	0	0	45
31	JW Bell	Golden Lions XV	8	0	0	0	40
31	Ruaan Lerm	Golden Lions XV	8	0	0	0	40
31	Marquit September	Blue Bulls	8	0	0	0	40
34	Danwel Demas	Boland Cavaliers	7	0	0	0	35
34	Stokkies Hanekom	Golden Lions XV	7	0	0	0	35
34	Jaco Hayward	Leopards	7	0	0	0	35
34	JP Lewis	Pumas / Western Province	7	0	0	0	35
34	Mark Pretorius	SWD Eagles	7	0	0	0	35
34	Daniel Roberts	SWD Eagles	7	0	0	0	35
34	Sergio Torrens	Boland Cavaliers	7	0	0	0	35
41	Duan Pretorius	Griffons	3	5	3	0	34
42	Jacquin Jansen	SWD Eagles	1	11	2	0	33
43	Benhard Janse van Rensburg	Leopards	2	8	2	0	32
44	Alshaun Bock	Griquas	6	0	0	0	30
44	Joseph Dweba	Free State XV	6	0	0	0	30
44	Reinhardt Erwee	Free State XV	6	0	0	0	30
44	Shane Kirkwood	Falcons	6	0	0	0	30
44	Khanyo Ngcukana	Western Province	6	0	0	0	30
44	Chad Solomon	Western Province	6	0	0	0	30
44	Anthony Volmink	Golden Lions XV	6	0	0	0	30
51	Warren Potgieter	Falcons	0	11	2	0	28
51	Courtney Winnaar	Eastern Province Kings	4	1	2	0	28
53	Oliver Zono	Border Bulldogs	2	4	3	0	27
54	Simon Bolze	Eastern Province Kings	1	9	1	0	26
54	Shaun Kaizemi	Welwitschias	0	7	4	0	26
56	Johan Deysel	Leopards	5	0	0	0	25
56	Martin du Toit	SWD Eagles	5	0	0	0	25
56	Tyler Fisher	Pumas	5	0	0	0	25
56	Johnathan Francke	Griquas	5	0	0	0	25
56	Jason Fraser	Griquas	5	0	0	0	25
56	Selom Gavor	Golden Lions XV	5	0	0	0	25
56	Lambert Groenewald	Pumas	5	0	0	0	25
56	Kurt Haupt	SWD Eagles	5	0	0	0	25
56	Frank Herne	Pumas	5	0	0	0	25
56	Grant Janke	Falcons	5	0	0	0	25
56	Somila Jho	Eastern Province Kings	5	0	0	0	25
56	De Wet Kruger	Griffons	5	0	0	0	25
56	Marius Louw	Sharks XV	5	0	0	0	25
56	Kefentse Mahlo	Blue Bulls	5	0	0	0	25
56	Jacques Nel	Golden Lions XV	5	0	0	0	25
56	Japie Nel	Griffons	5	0	0	0	25
56	Justin Phillips	Western Province	5	0	0	0	25
56	Roelof Smit	Blue Bulls	5	0	0	0	25
56	Heinrich Steyl	Pumas	2	3	3	0	25
56	Jade Stighling	Blue Bulls	5	0	0	0	25
56	Tapiwa Tsomondo	Blue Bulls	5	0	0	0	25
56	EW Viljoen	Western Province	5	0	0	0	25
78	Ntabeni Dukisa	Griquas	4	2	0	0	24
79	Riaan van Zyl	Welwitschias	3	1	2	0	23
80	Andries Truter	Falcons	4	1	0	0	22
81	Niel Marais	Free State XV	0	6	3	0	21
82	Ederies Arendse	Griquas	4	0	0	0	20
82	Wilmar Arnoldi	Leopards	4	0	0	0	20
82	Rowayne Beukman	Leopards	4	0	0	0	20
82	Tiaan Dorfling	Griquas	4	0	0	0	20
82	Daniël du Plessis	Western Province	4	0	0	0	20
82	François Du Toit	Pumas	4	0	0	0	20
82	Carel Greeff	Pumas	4	0	0	0	20
82	Kyle Hendricks	Falcons	4	0	0	0	20
82	Tertius Kruger	Free State XV	4	0	0	0	20
82	Tertius Maarman	Griffons	4	0	0	0	20
82	Khaya Majola	Sharks XV	4	0	0	0	20
82	Michael Makase	Border Bulldogs	4	0	0	0	20
82	Henko Marais	Leopards	4	0	0	0	20
82	Koch Marx	Golden Lions XV	4	0	0	0	20
82	Vuyo Mbotho	Griffons	4	0	0	0	20
82	Wandile Mjekevu	Sharks XV	4	0	0	0	20
82	Reg Muller	Falcons	4	0	0	0	20
82	Marcello Sampson	Pumas	4	0	0	0	20
82	Ramone Samuels	Golden Lions XV	4	0	0	0	20
82	Danie van der Merwe	Griffons	4	0	0	0	20
82	Chadley Wenn	Boland Cavaliers	4	0	0	0	20
82	Kurt Webster	Blue Bulls	1	6	1	0	20
104	Ashlon Davids	Golden Lions XV	1	7	0	0	19
104	Gouws Prinsloo	Griquas	0	8	1	0	19
106	Leighton Eksteen	SWD Eagles	3	0	1	0	18
106	Johann Tromp	Welwitschias	3	0	1	0	18
108	Divan Rossouw	Blue Bulls	3	1	0	0	17
109	Shaun Adendorff	Boland Cavaliers	3	0	0	0	15
109	Eital Bredenkamp	Western Province	3	0	0	0	15
109	Adriaan Carelse	Boland Cavaliers	1	5	0	0	15
109	JP Coetzee	Free State XV	3	0	0	0	15
109	Marcel Coetzee	Sharks XV	0	3	3	0	15
109	Stephan Coetzee	Sharks XV	3	0	0	0	15
109	Christo du Plessis	SWD Eagles	3	0	0	0	15
109	Lourens Erasmus	Golden Lions XV	3	0	0	0	15
109	Reniel Hugo	Free State XV	3	0	0	0	15
109	Alcino Izaacs	Blue Bulls	3	0	0	0	15
109	Zandré Jordaan	Boland Cavaliers	3	0	0	0	15
109	Hanro Liebenberg	Blue Bulls	3	0	0	0	15
109	Mosolwa Mafuma	Free State XV	3	0	0	0	15
109	Sylvian Mahuza	Golden Lions XV	3	0	0	0	15
109	Hoffmann Maritz	Pumas	3	0	0	0	15
109	Khulu Marwana	Sharks XV	3	0	0	0	15
109	Siya Masuku	Golden Lions XV	0	3	3	0	15
109	Bradley Moolman	Leopards	3	0	0	0	15
109	Loftus Morrison	Leopards	3	0	0	0	15
109	Sonwabiso Mqalo	Border Bulldogs	3	0	0	0	15
109	Dean Muir	Falcons	3	0	0	0	15
109	Philip Nashikaku	Welwitschias	3	0	0	0	15
109	Heinrich Roelfse	Griffons	3	0	0	0	15
109	Jeandré Rudolph	Leopards	3	0	0	0	15
109	Christian Rust	Falcons	3	0	0	0	15
109	Jarryd Sage	Golden Lions XV	3	0	0	0	15
109	Luke Stringer	Western Province	3	0	0	0	15
109	De-Jay Terblanche	Pumas	3	0	0	0	15
109	Brandon Thomson	Western Province	0	3	3	0	15
109	Reynier van Rooyen	Pumas	3	0	0	0	15
109	Rudi van Rooyen	Griquas	3	0	0	0	15
109	Andrew van Wyk	Falcons	3	0	0	0	15
109	Boela Venter	Griffons	3	0	0	0	15
109	André Warner	Blue Bulls	3	0	0	0	15
109	Tim Whitehead	Western Province	3	0	0	0	15
109	Mike Willemse	Western Province	3	0	0	0	15
145	Michael Brink	Eastern Province Kings	0	4	2	0	14
145	Athi Mayinje	Eastern Province Kings	2	2	0	0	14
147	Christo Coetzee	Falcons	1	4	0	0	13
148	Devon Williams	Pumas / Western Province	2	1	0	0	12
148	Morné Joubert	Sharks XV	2	1	0	0	12
150	Schalk Hugo	Leopards	0	4	1	0	11
150	Justin Nel	Welwitschias	1	3	0	0	11
152	Lusanda Badiyana	Eastern Province Kings	2	0	0	0	10
152	Renaldo Bothma	Blue Bulls	2	0	0	0	10
152	Malcolm Cele	Sharks XV	2	0	0	0	10
152	Cullen Collopy	Western Province	2	0	0	0	10
152	Beyers de Villiers	Western Province	2	0	0	0	10
152	Lunga Dumezweni	Border Bulldogs	2	0	0	0	10
152	Layle Delo	SWD Eagles	2	0	0	0	10
152	Maphutha Dolo	Free State XV	2	0	0	0	10
152	Alrin Eksteen	Sharks XV	2	0	0	0	10
152	Corniel Els	Blue Bulls	2	0	0	0	10
152	Lorenzo Gordon	Free State XV	2	0	0	0	10
152	Dirk Grobbelaar	Griffons	2	0	0	0	10
152	JP Jonck	Eastern Province Kings	2	0	0	0	10
152	Johannes Jonker	Border Bulldogs	2	0	0	0	10
152	JW Jonker	Griquas	2	0	0	0	10
152	Athenkosi Khethani	Border Bulldogs	2	0	0	0	10
152	Lesley Klim	Welwitschias	2	0	0	0	10
152	Jacques Kotzé	Pumas	2	0	0	0	10
152	Stephan Kotzé	Griquas	2	0	0	0	10
152	Juan Language	Leopards	2	0	0	0	10
152	AJ Le Roux	Griquas	2	0	0	0	10
152	Tiaan Liebenberg	Free State XV	2	0	0	0	10
152	Thabo Mamojele	Falcons	2	0	0	0	10
152	Neil Maritz	Sharks XV	2	0	0	0	10
152	Godlen Masimla	Western Province	2	0	0	0	10
152	Rabz Maxwane	Western Province	2	0	0	0	10
152	Shaun McDonald	Boland Cavaliers	2	0	0	0	10
152	Malcolm Moore	Welwitschias	2	0	0	0	10
152	Nqoba Mxoli	Blue Bulls	2	0	0	0	10
152	Nkosi Nofuma	Border Bulldogs	2	0	0	0	10
152	Hentzwill Pedro	SWD Eagles	2	0	0	0	10
152	Johan Pretorius	Falcons	2	0	0	0	10
152	Mahco Prinsloo	Welwitschias	2	0	0	0	10
152	Wandile Putuma	Border Bulldogs	2	0	0	0	10
152	Fiffy Rampeta	Free State XV	2	0	0	0	10
152	Neil Rautenbach	Free State XV / Griffons	2	0	0	0	10
152	Marno Redelinghuys	Leopards	2	0	0	0	10
152	Edwin Sass	Boland Cavaliers	2	0	0	0	10
152	Ricky Schroeder	Golden Lions XV	2	0	0	0	10
152	Victor Sekekete	Golden Lions XV	2	0	0	0	10
152	Brian Shabangu	Pumas	2	0	0	0	10
152	S'bura Sithole	Sharks XV	2	0	0	0	10
152	Hennie Skorbinski	Pumas	2	0	0	0	10
152	Janneman Stander	SWD Eagles	2	0	0	0	10
152	Johan Steyn	SWD Eagles	2	0	0	0	10
152	Jaco Taute	Western Province	2	0	0	0	10
152	Clinton Theron	Golden Lions XV	2	0	0	0	10
152	Sethu Tom	Border Bulldogs	2	0	0	0	10
152	Franswa Ueckermann	Eastern Province Kings	2	0	0	0	10
152	Lodewyk Uys	SWD Eagles	2	0	0	0	10
152	Edwill van der Merwe	Western Province	2	0	0	0	10
152	Kobus van Dyk	Western Province	2	0	0	0	10
152	Ruan van Rensburg	Free State XV	1	1	1	0	10
152	Russell van Wyk	Welwitschias	2	0	0	0	10
152	William van Wyk	Boland Cavaliers	2	0	0	0	10
152	Hanco Venter	Sharks XV	2	0	0	0	10
152	Adrian Vermeulen	Leopards	2	0	0	0	10
152	Ntokozo Vidima	Free State XV	2	0	0	0	10
152	Francois Wiese	Welwitschias	2	0	0	0	10
152	Gene Willemse	Leopards	2	0	0	0	10
152	Heimar Williams	Sharks XV	2	0	0	0	10
152	Marlyn Williams	Falcons	2	0	0	0	10
152	Mzwanele Zito	Griquas	2	0	0	0	10
215	Marlou van Niekerk	Pumas	1	2	0	0	9
215	Leighton van Wyk	Pumas	1	2	0	0	9
217	Manie Libbok	Blue Bulls	1	0	1	0	8
217	JP Smith	Free State XV	1	0	1	0	8
217	Jaco van der Walt	Golden Lions XV	0	4	0	0	8
220	Dennis Cox	Western Province	1	1	0	0	7
220	Pieter-Steyn de Wet	Free State XV	0	2	1	0	7
220	Malherbe Swart	Leopards	1	1	0	0	7
223	Ruan Ackermann	Golden Lions XV	1	0	0	0	5
223	Gavin Annandale	Griffons	1	0	0	0	5
223	Riaan Arends	SWD Eagles	1	0	0	0	5
223	Ludwe Booi	Border Bulldogs	1	0	0	0	5
223	Fabian Booysen	Golden Lions XV	1	0	0	0	5
223	Curwin Bosch	Sharks XV	1	0	0	0	5
223	Henri Boshoff	Falcons	1	0	0	0	5
223	Bernado Botha	Pumas	1	0	0	0	5
223	Ruan Botha	Sharks XV	1	0	0	0	5
223	Cyle Brink	Golden Lions XV	1	0	0	0	5
223	Tienie Burger	Free State XV	1	0	0	0	5
223	Duncan Campbell	Sharks XV	0	1	1	0	5
223	Aranos Coetzee	Free State XV	1	0	0	0	5
223	Carel-Jan Coetzee	Free State XV	1	0	0	0	5
223	Coert Cronjé	Falcons	1	0	0	0	5
223	Kenan Cronjé	Boland Cavaliers	1	0	0	0	5
223	Darryl de la Harpe	Welwitschias	1	0	0	0	5
223	Jo-Hanko de Villiers	Golden Lions XV	1	0	0	0	5
223	Bobby de Wee	Golden Lions XV	1	0	0	0	5
223	Stephan de Wit	Golden Lions XV	1	0	0	0	5
223	Leon du Plessis	Leopards	1	0	0	0	5
223	Jacques du Toit	Free State XV	1	0	0	0	5
223	Johan du Toit	Sharks XV	1	0	0	0	5
223	Billy Dutton	Border Bulldogs	1	0	0	0	5
223	Gerhard Engelbrecht	Sharks XV	1	0	0	0	5
223	Wilneth Engelbrecht	SWD Eagles	1	0	0	0	5
223	Nardus Erasmus	Free State XV	1	0	0	0	5
223	Marius Fourie	Griquas	1	0	0	0	5
223	Tazz Fuzani	Eastern Province Kings	1	0	0	0	5
223	JC Genade	Boland Cavaliers	1	0	0	0	5
223	Dean Greyling	Blue Bulls	1	0	0	0	5
223	Roan Grobbelaar	Leopards	1	0	0	0	5
223	Thor Halvorsen	SWD Eagles	1	0	0	0	5
223	Francois Hanekom	Boland Cavaliers	1	0	0	0	5
223	Lyndon Hartnick	SWD Eagles	1	0	0	0	5
223	Deon Helberg	Pumas	1	0	0	0	5
223	Liam Hendricks	Eastern Province Kings	1	0	0	0	5
223	Kirsten Heyns	SWD Eagles	1	0	0	0	5
223	Dean Hopp	SWD Eagles	1	0	0	0	5
223	Elandré Huggett	Free State XV	1	0	0	0	5
223	Marnus Hugo	Boland Cavaliers	1	0	0	0	5
223	Greg Jackson	Eastern Province Kings	1	0	0	0	5
223	JP Jamieson	Eastern Province Kings	1	0	0	0	5
223	Jono Janse van Rensburg	Griquas	1	0	0	0	5
223	Rohan Janse van Rensburg	Golden Lions XV	1	0	0	0	5
223	Pieter Jansen	Golden Lions XV	1	0	0	0	5
223	Damien Jansen van Rensburg	Pumas	1	0	0	0	5
223	Andile Jho	Eastern Province Kings	1	0	0	0	5
223	Reuben Johannes	Pumas	1	0	0	0	5
223	Jaco Jordaan	Leopards	1	0	0	0	5
223	Hanno Kitshoff	Boland Cavaliers	1	0	0	0	5
223	Rohan Kitshoff	Welwitschias	1	0	0	0	5
223	Jean Kleyn	Western Province	1	0	0	0	5
223	Sias Koen	Griquas	1	0	0	0	5
223	Johnny Kôtze	Western Province	1	0	0	0	5
223	Dan Kriel	Blue Bulls	1	0	0	0	5
223	Sandile Kubekha	Sharks XV	1	0	0	0	5
223	Bart le Roux	Leopards	1	0	0	0	5
223	Tiaan Liebenberg	Leopards	1	0	0	0	5
223	Robbie Louw	Boland Cavaliers	1	0	0	0	5
223	MB Lusaseni	Golden Lions XV	1	0	0	0	5
223	Thabo Mabuza	Griquas	1	0	0	0	5
223	Arnout Malherbe	Golden Lions XV	1	0	0	0	5
223	Theo Maree	Blue Bulls	1	0	0	0	5
223	Devon Martinus	Griquas	1	0	0	0	5
223	Duncan Matthews	Blue Bulls	1	0	0	0	5
223	Thato Mavundla	Griffons	1	0	0	0	5
223	David McDuling	Sharks XV	1	0	0	0	5
223	Siya Mdaka	Border Bulldogs	1	0	0	0	5
223	Christiaan Meyer	Griquas	1	0	0	0	5
223	Ali Mgijima	Free State XV	1	0	0	0	5
223	Derick Minnie	Golden Lions XV	1	0	0	0	5
223	Oupa Mohojé	Free State XV	1	0	0	0	5
223	Mihlali Mpafi	Border Bulldogs	1	0	0	0	5
223	Sphu Msutwana	Eastern Province Kings	1	0	0	0	5
223	Bruce Muller	Leopards	1	0	0	0	5
223	Freddie Muller	Western Province	1	0	0	0	5
223	David Murray	Eastern Province Kings	1	0	0	0	5
223	Franco Naudé	Blue Bulls	1	0	0	0	5
223	Ox Nché	Free State XV	1	0	0	0	5
223	Nkululeko Ndlovu	Border Bulldogs	1	0	0	0	5
223	Norman Nelson	Griffons	1	0	0	0	5
223	Siyamthanda Ngande	Border Bulldogs	1	0	0	0	5
223	Freddy Ngoza	Blue Bulls	1	0	0	0	5
223	SF Nieuwoudt	Eastern Province Kings	1	0	0	0	5
223	Sipho Nofemele	Border Bulldogs	1	0	0	0	5
223	Abongile Nonkontwana	Blue Bulls	1	0	0	0	5
223	Ossie Nortjé	Griffons	1	0	0	0	5
223	Andisa Ntsila	SWD Eagles	1	0	0	0	5
223	Sino Nyoka	Border Bulldogs / Falcons	1	0	0	0	5
223	Dwight Pansegrouw	Falcons	1	0	0	0	5
223	Buran Parks	SWD Eagles	1	0	0	0	5
223	Yaw Penxe	Eastern Province Kings	1	0	0	0	5
223	Charles Radebe	SWD Eagles	1	0	0	0	5
223	Godfrey Ramaboea	Golden Lions XV	1	0	0	0	5
223	Anrich Richter	Falcons	1	0	0	0	5
223	Marnus Schoeman	Pumas	1	0	0	0	5
223	Andries Schutte	Falcons	1	0	0	0	5
223	Basil Short	Boland Cavaliers	1	0	0	0	5
223	Martin Sithole	Griffons	1	0	0	0	5
223	Jannie Stander	Pumas	1	0	0	0	5
223	Walt Steenkamp	Leopards	1	0	0	0	5
223	Barend Steyn	Falcons	1	0	0	0	5
223	Hendri Storm	Border Bulldogs	1	0	0	0	5
223	Meyer Swanepoel	Western Province	1	0	0	0	5
223	BG Uys	Free State XV	1	0	0	0	5
223	Christo van der Merwe	Western Province	1	0	0	0	5
223	Nardus van der Walt	Pumas	1	0	0	0	5
223	Peet van der Walt	SWD Eagles	1	0	0	0	5
223	Dane van der Westhuyzen	Leopards	1	0	0	0	5
223	Ruben van Heerden	Blue Bulls	1	0	0	0	5
223	Alandré van Rooyen	Blue Bulls	1	0	0	0	5
223	Jacques van Rooyen	Golden Lions XV	1	0	0	0	5
223	Jurie van Vuuren	Western Province	1	0	0	0	5
223	Denzil van Wyk	Welwitschias	1	0	0	0	5
223	Frans van Wyk	Western Province	1	0	0	0	5
223	Chris van Zyl	Western Province	1	0	0	0	5
223	Ivan van Zyl	Blue Bulls	1	0	0	0	5
223	Ockie van Zyl	Boland Cavaliers	1	0	0	0	5
223	James Venter	Golden Lions XV	1	0	0	0	5
223	Janco Venter	Western Province	1	0	0	0	5
223	Keanu Vers	Eastern Province Kings	1	0	0	0	5
223	Callie Visagie	Blue Bulls	1	0	0	0	5
223	Wian Vosloo	Sharks XV	1	0	0	0	5
223	Clinton Wagman	SWD Eagles	1	0	0	0	5
223	Jeremy Ward	Eastern Province Kings	1	0	0	0	5
223	Carl Wegner	Free State XV	1	0	0	0	5
223	Ryno Wepener	Leopards	1	0	0	0	5
223	Jasper Wiese	Free State XV	1	0	0	0	5
223	JC Winckler	Welwitschias	1	0	0	0	5
223	Johann Wohler	Welwitschias	1	0	0	0	5
223	Lindelwe Zungu	Eastern Province Kings	1	0	0	0	5
355	Gerrie Labuschagné	Free State XV	0	2	0	0	4
355	Colin Herbert	Griffons	0	2	0	0	4
357	Steven Moir	Griquas	0	0	1	0	3
357	Heinrich Smit	Welwitschias	0	0	1	0	3
359	Darren Baron	Free State XV	0	1	0	0	2
359	Tinus de Beer	Blue Bulls	0	1	0	0	2
359	JP du Plessis	Falcons	0	1	0	0	2
359	Damian Engledoe	Falcons	0	1	0	0	2
359	Eric Zana	Griquas	0	1	0	0	2
—	penalty try	Eastern Province Kings	3	0	0	0	15
—	penalty try	Border Bulldogs	1	0	0	0	5
—	penalty try	Free State XV	1	0	0	0	5
—	penalty try	Griffons	1	0	0	0	5
—	penalty try	Griquas	1	0	0	0	5
* Legend: T = Tries, C = Conversions, P = Penalties, DG = Drop Goals, Pts = Points.

=== Squads ===
The following squads were named for the 2016 Currie Cup qualification series:

Blue Bulls squad
Forwards	Andrew Beerwinkel • Renaldo Bothma • Jan-Henning Campher • Clyde Davids • Nick de Jager • Martin Dreyer • Corniel Els • Aston Fortuin • Justin Forwood • Neethling Fouché • Dean Greyling • Njabulo Gumede • Irné Herbst • Nico Janse van Rensburg • Werner Kruger • Hanro Liebenberg • Bandise Maku • Nqoba Mxoli • Freddy Ngoza • Abongile Nonkontwana • Marvin Orie • Le Roux Roets • Roelof Smit • Eli Snyman • Ruan Steenkamp • Deon Stegmann • Entienne Swanepoel • Jsuan-re Swanepoel • Tapiwa Tsomondo • Jan van der Merwe • Dayan van der Westhuizen • Ruben van Heerden • Alandré van Rooyen • Hencus van Wyk • Callie Visagie • Jaco Visagie • Did not play: • Matthys Basson • Wynand de Necker • Arnold Gerber • Rohan Goosen • Stefaan Grundlingh • Grant Hattingh • Riekert Hattingh • Madot Mabokela • Justin Meintjies • Menzi Nhlabathi • Pierre Schoeman • PJ Toerien • Luigy van Jaarsveld
Backs	Bjorn Basson • Tinus de Beer • Warrick Gelant • Alcino Izaacs • JT Jackson • Tony Jantjies • Dan Kriel • Manie Libbok • Adrian Maebane • Kefentse Mahlo • Theo Maree • Duncan Matthews • Ganfried May • Dewald Naudé • Franco Naudé • Luther Obi • Divan Rossouw • Marquit September • Joshua Stander • Jade Stighling • Dries Swanepoel • Duhan van der Merwe • Ivan van Zyl • André Warner • Kurt Webster • Did not play: • Jerry Danquah • Corné de Klerk • Dale Hendricks • Keanu Langeveldt • Tshepiso Mahasha • Sipho Phiri • Curtley Prins • Marais Schmidt • Marcel Steyn-Scholtz • Hanco Venter
Coach	Hendré Marnitz

Boland Cavaliers squad
Forwards	Shaun Adendorff • Yves Bashiya • Kenan Cronjé • Francois Esterhuyzen • JC Genade • Francois Hanekom • Ferdie Horn • Zandré Jordaan • Hanno Kitshoff • Clemen Lewis • Shaun McDonald • Niel Oelofse • Basil Short • Linda Thwala • Ockie van Zyl • Chadley Wenn • SP Wessels • Chaney Willemse • Wayne Wilschut • Did not play: • Gareth Cilliers • Enoch Mnyaka • Ludio Williams
Backs	Christopher Bosch • Adriaan Carelse • Jovelian de Koker • Danwel Demas • Gavin Hauptfleisch • Marnus Hugo • Gerhard Jordaan • Theuns Kotzé • Robbie Louw • Ryan Nell • Craig Pheiffer • Edwin Sass • Nico Scheepers • Sergio Torrens • Gerrit van Wyk • William van Wyk • Did not play: • Charlie Mayeza • Wesley Pindele
Coach	Brent Janse van Rensburg

Border Bulldogs squad
Forwards	Ludwe Booi • Onke Dubase • Billy Dutton • Johannes Janse van Rensburg • Johannes Jonker • Athenkosi Khethani • Josh Kota • Blake Kyd • Athenkosi Manentsa • Siya Mdaka • Mihlali Mpafi • Buhle Mxunyelwa • Siyamthanda Ngande • Nkosi Nofuma • Lukhanyo Nomzanga • Wandile Putuma • Hendri Storm • Lindokuhle Welemu • Yanga Xakalashe • Did not play: • Phumlani Blaauw • Ayabonga Nomboyo • Soso Xakalashe
Backs	Masixole Banda • Logan Basson • Lunga Dumezweni • Bangi Kobese • Michael Makase • Makazole Mapimpi • Thembani Mkokeli • Sonwabiso Mqalo • Sibabalwe Mtsulwana • Siya Ncanywa • Nkululeko Ndlovu • Saneliso Ngoma • Sipho Nofemele • Sino Nyoka • Lundi Ralarala • Sethu Tom • Zukisani Tywaleni • Oliver Zono • Did not play: • Ntando Kebe • Tiger Mangweni
Unknown	Did not play: • Minenhle Ngidi
Coach	David Dobela • Elliot Fana

Eastern Province Kings squad
Forwards	Louis Albertse • Lusanda Badiyana • Tango Balekile • Martin Bezuidenhout • Brandon Brown • Wihan Coetzer • Stephan Deyzel • Philip du Preez • Jacques Engelbrecht • Tazz Fuzani • Wynand Grassmann • Liam Hendricks • Cornell Hess • Justin Hollis • Gerrit Huisamen • Hannes Huisamen • Greg Jackson • JP Jamieson • JP Jonck • Rob Lyons • Sintu Manjezi • David Murray • SF Nieuwoudt • NJ Oosthuizen • Junior Pokomela • Jayson Reinecke • Vukile Sofisa • Roché van Zyl • Warrick Venter • Stephan Zaayman • Did not play: • Tyler Paul • Hayden Tharratt
Backs	Simon Bolze • Michael Brink • Davron Cameron • JP du Plessis • Ivan-John du Preez • Riaan Esterhuizen • Chuma Faas • Andile Jho • Somila Jho • Jordan Koekemoer • Garrick Mattheus • Athi Mayinje • Jixie Molapo • Sphu Msutwana • Rouche Nel • Sibusiso Ngcokovane • Yaw Penxe • Mabhutana Peter • Franswa Ueckermann • Jaco van Tonder • Keanu Vers • Jeremy Ward • Courtney Winnaar • Lindelwe Zungu • Did not play: • Thaki Boloko • Warren Swarts • Elgar Watts
Coach	Robbi Kempson

Falcons squad
Forwards	Jacques Alberts • Henri Boshoff • Isak Deetlefs • Vince Jobo • Shane Kirkwood • Ernst Ladendorf • Thabo Mamojele • JP Mostert • Dean Muir • Reg Muller • Friedle Olivier • Dwight Pansegrouw • Andries Schutte • Barend Steyn • Koos Strauss • Gihard Visagie • Grant Watts • Marlyn Williams • Did not play: • Justin Pappin • Themba Thabethe
Backs	Ruan Allerston • Karlo Aspeling • Christo Coetzee • Coert Cronjé • Xander Cronjé • JP du Plessis • Damian Engledoe • Kyle Hendricks • Grant Janke • Charlie Mayeza • Sino Nyoka • Warren Potgieter • Johan Pretorius • Anrich Richter • Christian Rust • Etienne Taljaard • Andries Truter • Andrew van Wyk • Did not play: • Etienne Storm • Waylon Thompson
Coach	Rudy Joubert

Free State XV squad
Forwards	Justin Basson • Willie Britz • Tienie Burger • Neil Claassen • Aranos Coetzee • Luan de Bruin • Erich de Jager • Jacques du Toit • Joseph Dweba • Nardus Erasmus • Johann Grundlingh • Elandré Huggett • Reniel Hugo • Günther Janse van Vuuren • Niell Jordaan • Armandt Koster • Johan Kotze • Tiaan Liebenberg • Musa Mahlasela • Victor Maruping • Danie Mienie • Oupa Mohojé • Gopolang Molefe • Chase Morison • Ox Nché • Fiffy Rampeta • Neil Rautenbach • Boela Serfontein • Yōsuke Takahashi • BG Uys • Henco Venter • Reinach Venter • Brendan Verster • Ntokozo Vidima • Quintin Vorster • Carl Wegner • Jasper Wiese • Did not play: • Dolph Botha • Junior Burger • Wynne Crawford • JC Fourie • Nicolaas Immelman • Alex Jonker • Willandré Kotzenberg • De Wet Kruger • Brandon Kuzatjike • Hilton Lobberts • Daniel Maartens • Sylvester Makakole • Damien May • Teunis Nieuwoudt • Gerhard Olivier • Kaden Prince • Dean Rossouw • SJ Roux • Robin Stevens • Hennie-Schalk Theron • Conraad van Vuuren • Pieter Venter • Dennis Visser
Backs	Darren Baron • Rayno Benjamin • Renier Botha • Carel-Jan Coetzee • JP Coetzee • Pieter-Steyn de Wet • Maphutha Dolo • Sias Ebersohn • Reinhardt Erwee • Lorenzo Gordon • Tertius Kruger • Gerrie Labuschagné • Mosolwa Mafuma • Niel Marais • Ali Mgijima • Zee Mkhabela • Kholo Ramashala • JP Smith • Michael van der Spuy • Ruan van Rensburg • Arno van Staden • Did not play: • Carlton Coeries • Luke Cyster • Ludwig Erasmus • Henry Immelman • Stephan Janse van Rensburg • Julian Jordaan • Garneth Kock • Nico Lee • Marco Mason • Shaun Prins • Tiaan Schmulian • Yoshizumi Takeda • Coenie van Wyk • Louis Venter • Arrie Vosloo • Ruan Wasserman • Dwayne Wessels • Arthur Williams
Coach	MJ Smith

Golden Lions XV squad
Forwards	Justin Ackerman • Ruan Ackermann • Le Roux Baard • Driaan Bester • Fabian Booysen • Cyle Brink • Jo-Hanko de Villiers • Bobby de Wee • Stephan de Wit • Nico du Plessis • JP du Preez • Lourens Erasmus • Andries Ferreira • Corné Fourie • Wiehan Jacobs • Pieter Jansen • Kyle Kruger • Robert Kruger • Ruaan Lerm • MB Lusaseni • Arnout Malherbe • Derick Minnie • Martin Muller • Luvuyo Pupuma • Ramone Samuels • Pieter Scholtz • Victor Sekekete • Henco Smit • Dylan Smith • Jannes Snyman • Warwick Tecklenburg • Clinton Theron • Jacques van Rooyen • James Venter • Jano Venter • Did not play: • CJ Conradie • Estian Enslin • Juandré Michau • Dwayne Pienaar • Sarel Smith • Koos Tredoux • Akker van der Merwe
Backs	JW Bell • Marnitz Boshoff • Andries Coetzee • Ross Cronjé • Ashlon Davids • Aphiwe Dyantyi • Selom Gavor • Lloyd Greeff • Stokkies Hanekom • Rohan Janse van Rensburg • Marco Jansen van Vuren • Curtis Jonas • Sylvian Mahuza • Koch Marx • Siya Masuku • Jacques Nel • Godfrey Ramaboea • Shaun Reynolds • Cameron Rooi • Jarryd Sage • Ricky Schroeder • Barend Smit • Dillon Smit • Jaco van der Walt • Anthony Volmink • Did not play: • Kobus Engelbrecht • Jurie Linde • Sampie Mastriet • Gerdus van der Walt
Coach	Bafana Nhleko

Griffons squad
Forwards	Gavin Annandale • Zingisa April • Gerard Baard • PW Botha • Samora Fihlani • Dirk Grobbelaar • Boetie Groenewald • De Wet Kruger • Wayne Ludick • George Marich • Vincent Maruping • Thato Mavundla • Khwezi Mkhafu • Neil Rautenbach • Heinrich Roelfse • Frans Sisita • Martin Sithole • Danie van der Merwe • Boela Venter • Hennie Venter • Did not play: • Jan Breedt • Rudi Britz • Werner Kotze • Erik le Roux
Backs	Boela Abrahams • Selvyn Davids • Pieter-Steyn de Wet • Franna du Toit • Joubert Engelbrecht • Colin Herbert • Lohan Lubbe • Tertius Maarman • Vuyo Mbotho • Japie Nel • Norman Nelson • Ossie Nortjé • Duan Pretorius • Sherwin Slater • Malcolm-Kerr Till • Coenie van Wyk • Louis Venter • George Whitehead • Warren Williams • Did not play: • Hein Bezuidenhout • Wynand Pienaar • Dewald Pretorius • Tshidiso Tlale
Coach	Oersond Gorgonzola

Griquas squad
Forwards	Jonathan Adendorf • David Antonites • Marius Fourie • Jason Fraser • Jono Janse van Rensburg • Sias Koen • Stephan Kotzé • Luxolo Koza • AJ le Roux • RJ Liebenberg • Thabo Mabuza • Devon Martinus • Steven Meiring • Jaco Nepgen • Teunis Nieuwoudt • Steph Roberts • Sidney Tobias • Ewald van der Westhuizen • Steph Vermeulen • Wendal Wehr • Mzwanele Zito
Backs	Ederies Arendse • Alshaun Bock • Renier Botha • AJ Coertzen • Tiaan Dorfling • Ntabeni Dukisa • Johnathan Francke • JW Jonker • Kyle Lombard • Christiaan Meyer • Steven Moir • Gouws Prinsloo • Clinton Swart • André Swarts • Rudi van Rooyen • Eric Zana
Coach	Peter Engledow

Leopards squad
Forwards	Wilmar Arnoldi • Molotsi Bouwer • Leon du Plessis • Roan Grobbelaar • Danie Jordaan • Jaco Jordaan • Juan Language • Bart le Roux • Tiaan Liebenberg • Mash Mafela • Stairs Mhlongo • Loftus Morrison • Bruce Muller • Lucky Ngcamu • Marno Redelinghuys • Francois Robertse • Jeandré Rudolph • Walt Steenkamp • HP Swart • Louis van der Westhuizen • Dane van der Westhuyzen • Ruan Venter • Did not play: • Wian Fourie • Mogau Mabokela • Tshego Moloto • Bhekisa Shongwe • Joe Smith
Backs	Rowayne Beukman • Myburgh Briers • Lucian Cupido • Johan Deysel • Cecil Dumond • Jaco Hayward • Schalk Hugo • Benhard Janse van Rensburg • Henko Marais • Bradley Moolman • Chriswill September • Rhyno Smith • Dean Stokes • Malherbe Swart • Adrian Vermeulen • Johnny Welthagen • Ryno Wepener • Gene Willemse • Percy Williams • Did not play: • Wesley Cupido • Arthur Festus • Dalen Goliath • Akhona Nela
Coach	Jonathan Mokeuna

Pumas squad
Forwards	Marné Coetzee • François du Toit • Carel Greeff • Stephan Greeff • Lambert Groenewald • Wiehan Hay • Frank Herne • Rassie Jansen van Vuuren • Reuben Johannes • Hugo Kloppers • Jacques Kotzé • Khwezi Mona • Giant Mtyanda • Sabelo Nhlapo • Dylan Peterson • Marnus Schoeman • Brian Shabangu • Jannie Stander • De-Jay Terblanche • Nardus van der Walt • Simon Westraadt • Did not play: • Jeremy Jordaan
Backs	Bernado Botha • Tyler Fisher • Deon Helberg • Johan Herbst • Ruwellyn Isbell • Damien Jansen van Rensburg • JP Lewis • Wilmaure Louw • Hoffmann Maritz • Marcello Sampson • Hennie Skorbinski • Heinrich Steyl • Emile Temperman • Marlou van Niekerk • Reynier van Rooyen • Justin van Staden • Leighton van Wyk • Devon Williams • Did not play: • Ian Truter
Coach	MJ Mentz

Sharks XV squad
Forwards	Hyron Andrews • Ruan Botha • Dale Chadwick • Stephan Coetzee • Chris de Beer • Christiaan de Bruin • Jean Droste • Andrew du Plessis • Johan du Toit • Thomas du Toit • Gerhard Engelbrecht • Graham Geldenhuys • Francois Kleinhans • Ruan Kramer • Khaya Majola • Mzamo Majola • Retief Marais • David McDuling • John-Hubert Meyer • Tera Mtembu • Barend Potgieter • Chiliboy Ralepelle • Juan Schoeman • Ayron Schramm • Tjiuee Uanivi • Kerron van Vuuren • Wian Vosloo • Did not play: • Greg Bauer • Reyno du Toit • Wade Elliott • Bernardus Haring • Kyle Hatherell • Matt Jones • Erich Kankowski • Michael Meyer • Mthunzi Moloi • Ruan Smook • Christie van der Merwe • Ray Williams • Rikus Zwart
Backs	Tristan Blewett • Curwin Bosch • Duncan Campbell • Malcolm Cele • Marcel Coetzee • Alrin Eksteen • Kelvin Elder • Rowan Gouws • Morné Joubert • Jaywinn Juries • Sandile Kubekha • Marius Louw • Dylan Marcus • Neil Maritz • Khulu Marwana • Wandile Mjekevu • Sipho Mkhize • S'busiso Nkosi • Inny Radebe • S'bura Sithole • Tristan Tedder • Hanco Venter • Heimar Williams • Did not play: • Tythan Adams • Matthew Alborough • Cameron Dunlop • Andrew Holland • Michael Reid • Mark Richards • José Rodrigues • Zweli Silaule • Stefan Ungerer • Morné van Staden • Alwayno Visagie
Coach	Michael Horak

SWD Eagles squad
Forwards	Brianton Booysen • Layle Delo • Juandré Digue • Christo du Plessis • Thor Halvorsen • Lyndon Hartnick • Kurt Haupt • Dean Hopp • Marco Kruger • Grant le Roux • Gideon Muller • Andisa Ntsila • Buran Parks • Mark Pretorius • Davon Raubenheimer • Nemo Roelofse • Janneman Stander • Pieter Stemmet • Lodewyk Uys • Peet van der Walt • Did not play: • Wayne Khan • Schalk Oelofse
Backs	Riaan Arends • Martin du Toit • Mzo Dyantyi • Leighton Eksteen • Wilneth Engelbrecht • Hansie Graaff • Kirsten Heyns • Jacquin Jansen • Tom Kean • Leegan Moos • Lenes Nomdo • Hentzwill Pedro • Charles Radebe • Daniel Roberts • Dillin Snel • Johan Steyn • Luzuko Vulindlu • Clinton Wagman
Coach	Abé Davids • Rynard van As

Welwitschias squad
Forwards	Schalk Bergh • Morné Blom • Aleck Botha • Petri Burger • Dewald Coetzee • Leneve Damens • Wikus Davis • AJ de Klerk • Tinus du Plessis • Shaun du Preez • Alberto Engelbrecht • Quintin Esterhuizen • Zayne Groenewaldt • Joe Herrmann • Thomas Kali • Munio Kasiringua • Max Katjijeko • Rohan Kitshoff • Herman Krause • Gert Lotter • Ruan Ludick • Johan Luttig • Grant Nash • Collen Smith • Carel Swanepoel • Tjino Tjirare • Ignus Tripodi • Niël van Vuuren • Denzil van Wyk • Hauta Veii • Roderique Victor • Casper Viviers • Arno von Wielligh • Johann Wohler
Backs	Tuna Amutenya • Silvano Beukes • Handré Bezuidenhout • Arthur Bouwer • Egon Cloete • Darryl de la Harpe • JC Greyling • Shaun Kaizemi • Cameron Klassen • Lesley Klim • Guiliano Lawrence • Malcolm Moore • Philip Nashikaku • Justin Nel • Aurelio Plato • MP Pretorius • Mahco Prinsloo • Heinrich Smit • Ricardo Swartz • Johann Tromp • Riaan van Zyl • Russell van Wyk • Francois Wiese • JC Winckler
Coach	John Williams

Western Province squad
Forwards	Rikus Bothma • Eital Bredenkamp • Wesley Chetty • Cullen Collopy • Tertius Daniller • Beyers de Villiers • JC Janse van Rensburg • Jean Kleyn • Wilco Louw • Percy Mngadi • David Ribbans • Denzel Riddles • JD Schickerling • JP Smith • Chad Solomon • Luke Stringer • Meyer Swanepoel • Christo van der Merwe • Kobus van Dyk • Jurie van Vuuren • Christo van Wyk • Frans van Wyk • Chris van Zyl • Janco Venter • Alistair Vermaak • Jacques Vermeulen • Ashley Wells • Kyle Whyte • Mike Willemse • Dale Wilson • Eduard Zandberg • Did not play: • Wesley Adonis
Backs	Alvin Brandt • Dennis Cox • Daniël du Plessis • Robert du Preez • Grant Hermanus • Herschel Jantjies • Berton Klaasen • Johnny Kôtze • JP Lewis • Godlen Masimla • Rabz Maxwane • Freddie Muller • Khanyo Ngcukana • Ryan Oosthuizen • Justin Phillips • Damian Stevens • Jaco Taute • Brandon Thomson • Scott van Breda • Edwill van der Merwe • Jano Vermaak • EW Viljoen • Tim Whitehead • Devon Williams • Did not play: • Jean-Luc du Plessis • Ryno Eksteen • Chris Smit • Chris Smith • Ernst Stapelberg • Leolin Zas
Coach	John Dobson

=== Discipline ===
The following table contains all the cards handed out during the tournament:

Red and multiple yellow cards
Player	Team	Red card	Temporarily suspended
Khwezi Mkhafu	Griffons	0	4
Siya Mdaka	Border Bulldogs	0	3
Wilmar Arnoldi	Leopards	0	2
Martin Bezuidenhout	Eastern Province Kings	0	2
Grant Hermanus	Western Province	0	2
Khulu Marwana	Sharks XV	0	2
Khwezi Mona	Pumas	0	2
Ricky Schroeder	Golden Lions XV	0	2
Nardus van der Walt	Pumas	0	2
Lindokuhle Welemu	Border Bulldogs	0	2

Single yellow cards
Player	Team	Red card	Temporarily suspended
Jonathan Adendorf	Griquas	0	1
Shaun Adendorff	Boland Cavaliers	0	1
Justin Basson	Free State XV	0	1
Tienie Burger	Free State XV	0	1
Wihan Coetzer	Eastern Province Kings	0	1
Leneve Damens	Welwitschias	0	1
Selvyn Davids	Griffons	0	1
Christiaan de Bruin	Sharks XV	0	1
Bobby de Wee	Golden Lions XV	0	1
Danwel Demas	Boland Cavaliers	0	1
Juandré Digue	SWD Eagles	0	1
Maphutha Dolo	Free State XV	0	1
JP du Plessis	Falcons	0	1
Shaun du Preez	Welwitschias	0	1
Johan du Toit	Sharks XV	0	1
Mzo Dyantyi	SWD Eagles	0	1
Samora Fihlani	Griffons	0	1
Tazz Fuzani	Eastern Province Kings	0	1
Roan Grobbelaar	Leopards	0	1
Cornell Hess	Eastern Province Kings	0	1
Nico Janse van Rensburg	Blue Bulls	0	1
Rohan Kitshoff	Welwitschias	0	1
Cameron Klassen	Welwitschias	0	1
Hugo Kloppers	Pumas	0	1
Sias Koen	Griquas	0	1
Ernst Ladendorf	Falcons	0	1
Grant le Roux	SWD Eagles	0	1
Ruaan Lerm	Golden Lions XV	0	1
Hanro Liebenberg	Blue Bulls	0	1
RJ Liebenberg	Griquas	0	1
Sylvian Mahuza	Golden Lions XV	0	1
Mzamo Majola	Sharks XV	0	1
Sintu Manjezi	Eastern Province Kings	0	1
Makazole Mapimpi	Border Bulldogs	0	1
Henko Marais	Leopards	0	1
Vincent Maruping	Griffons	0	1
Godlen Masimla	Western Province	0	1
David McDuling	Sharks XV	0	1
Christiaan Meyer	Griquas	0	1
Derick Minnie	Golden Lions XV	0	1
Malcolm Moore	Welwitschias	0	1
Mihlali Mpafi	Border Bulldogs	0	1
Sonwabiso Mqalo	Border Bulldogs	0	1
Sphu Msutwana	Eastern Province Kings	0	1
Nqoba Mxoli	Blue Bulls	0	1
Lucky Ngcamu	Leopards	0	1
Nkosi Nofuma	Border Bulldogs	0	1
Lenes Nomdo	SWD Eagles	0	1
Andisa Ntsila	SWD Eagles	0	1
Marvin Orie	Blue Bulls	0	1
Marno Redelinghuys	Leopards	0	1
Le Roux Roets	Blue Bulls	0	1
Marnus Schoeman	Pumas	0	1
Marquit September	Blue Bulls	0	1
Heinrich Smit	Welwitschias	0	1
Rhyno Smith	Leopards	0	1
Vukile Sofisa	Eastern Province Kings	0	1
Janneman Stander	SWD Eagles	0	1
Ruan Steenkamp	Blue Bulls	0	1
Johan Steyn	SWD Eagles	0	1
Meyer Swanepoel	Western Province	0	1
Etienne Taljaard	Falcons	0	1
De-Jay Terblanche	Pumas	0	1
Franswa Ueckermann	Eastern Province Kings	0	1
Lodewyk Uys	SWD Eagles	0	1
Christo van der Merwe	Western Province	0	1
Peet van der Walt	SWD Eagles	0	1
Reynier van Rooyen	Pumas	0	1
Rudi van Rooyen	Griquas	0	1
Kerron van Vuuren	Sharks XV	0	1
Russell van Wyk	Welwitschias	0	1
Hauta Veii	Welwitschias	0	1
Warrick Venter	Eastern Province Kings	0	1
Steph Vermeulen	Griquas	0	1
Clinton Wagman	SWD Eagles	0	1
Wendal Wehr	Griquas	0	1
Courtney Winnaar	Eastern Province Kings	0	1
* Legend: (red card) = Sent off, (yellow card) = Sin-binned

== Referees ==
The following referees officiated matches in the 2016 Currie Cup qualification series:

2016 Currie Cup qualification referees
Referees	Stuart Berry • Rodney Boneparte • Pierre Brousset • Ben Crouse • Stephan Geldenhuys • Quinton Immelman • AJ Jacobs • Cwengile Jadezweni • Craig Joubert • Jaco Kotze • Pro Legoete • Sindile Ngcese • Jaco Peyper • Francois Pretorius • Rasta Rasivhenge • Egon Seconds • Archie Sehlako • Juan Sylvestre • Lourens van der Merwe • Marius van der Westhuizen • Jaco van Heerden

== See also ==
- 2016 Currie Cup Premier Division
- 2016 Currie Cup First Division
- 2016 Under-21 Provincial Championship
- 2016 Under-20 Provincial Championship
- 2016 Under-19 Provincial Championship
