= Dirk Grobbelaar =

South African rugby union player

- Full name: Hendrik Grobbelaar
- Born: 8 February 1992 (age 34) Benoni, South Africa
- Height: 1.87 m (6 ft 1 1/2 in)
- Weight: 110 kg (240 lb; 17 st 5 lb)
- School: Hoërskool Hans Strijdom, Mookgophong

Rugby union career
- Position: Flanker / Number eight
Youth career
- 2008: Limpopo Blue Bulls
- 2012–2013: Griffons
Senior career
Years	Team	Apps	(Points)
2013–2016	Griffons	15	(10)
2016	Eastern Province Kings	2	(0)
- Correct as of 9 December 2016

Hendrik Grobbelaar (born 8 February 1992) is a South African professional rugby union player, who most recently played with the Eastern Province Kings. His regular position is flanker or number eight.

== Rugby career ==
=== 2006: Limpopo ===
Grobbelaar was born in Benoni, but grew up in Mookgophong (known as Naboomspruit until 2006) in the Limpopo province. He was selected to represent Limpopo at the 2008 Under-16 Grant Khomo Week held in Ermelo, where he started two of their three matches.

=== 2012–2016: Griffons ===
In 2012, he was included in the Welkom-based Griffons' Under-21 squad for their Under-21 Provincial Championship campaign. He started all six of their matches in the number eight jersey, scoring a try against Pumas U21 in a 40–43 defeat, but could not help his side to a victory, as they lost all six matches to finish bottom of the log.

Grobbelaar made his first class debut in March 2013, coming on as a replacement in the Griffons' 2013 Vodacom Cup match against the Limpopo Blue Bulls in Polokwane. He made his first start a week later against Griquas, but failed to feature for the Griffons for the remainder of 2013. He made a single appearance in the 2014 Vodacom Cup – as a replacement in a 10–49 defeat to the Blue Bulls – before making his Currie Cup debut, playing off the bench in the Griffons First Division match against the Border Bulldogs, helping his team to a 37–32 victory.

Grobbelaar got marginally more playing time in 2015, making three appearances off the bench in the Griffons' Vodacom Cup season before starting against the SWD Eagles during the Currie Cup First Division regular season and against the same opposition in their 40–47 semi-final loss a week later.

Grobbelaar made two starts and four appearances off the bench in the Griffons' 2016 Currie Cup qualification campaign, and scored his first senior try in their 101–0 victory over Namibian side the Welwitschias in his third appearance of the season. The Griffons finished ninth, to qualify to the Currie Cup First Division.

=== 2016: Eastern Province Kings ===
Grobbelaar signed a contract to play for the Port Elizabeth-based Eastern Province Kings in the 2016 Currie Cup Premier Division. He made his EP Kings – and Currie Cup Premier Division – debut in their Round Two match against the Boland Cavaliers. His only other appearance came as he started their rescheduled midweek match against Griquas in a 24–47 defeat. and his side eventually lost all eight of their matches in the competition to finish bottom of the log.
