= Hendré Marnitz =

- Full name: Hendrik Marnitz

Rugby union career
- Correct as of 9 November 2015
Coaching career
- Years: Team
- 2009: India (joint head coach)
- 2010–2012: Buccaneers
- 2013: Blue Bulls (backs and defence coach)
- 2014: Blue Bulls U19
- 2014: UP Tuks Young Guns
- 2015: Blue Bulls U21
- 2016–present: Blue Bulls

Hendré Marnitz is a South African rugby union coach, currently the head coach of the Blue Bulls.

== Career ==
Marnitz is originally from Johannesburg, but moved to Stellenbosch where he became involved in coaching at the University of Stellenbosch – taking charge of the Helderberg, PSO Barbarians and Dagbreek koshuis sides – and at the Western Province Rugby Institute. He played as a scrum-half before taking up coaching and was also involved in sports agency and player management.

=== India ===
Marnitz was the joint-head coach of the India national rugby union team alongside fellow South African coach Norman Laker in 2009.

=== Buccaneers ===
In 2010, Marnitz moved to Ireland to take over as the head coach of Athlone-based All-Ireland League side Buccaneers. In his first season in charge, he guided them to third position in the 2010–2011 All-Ireland League Division 1B, while they finished in sixth spot in the 2011–2012 season. He resigned as head coach after four rounds of the 2012–2013 season to return to South Africa to take up a role with the Blue Bulls.

=== Blue Bulls ===
Marnitz was appointed as a backs and defence coach for the Blue Bulls' Vodacom Cup side for the 2013 competition. In November 2013, he became the head coach of the Blue Bulls U19 side, as well as the head coach of the UP Tuks Young Guns side. He guided the latter to the final of the 2014 Varsity Young Guns competition, which they lost in a kick-off after a 17–all draw after extra time. He also guided the Blue Bulls Under-19s to the final of the 2014 Under-19 Provincial Championship, but again ended fell short in the final as Western Province U19 ran out 33–26 winners.

In July 2015, he was appointed as the head coach of the Blue Bulls U21 team, but he had a disappointing first season in charge as they finished in fifth position on the log, failing to qualify for the semi-finals. In November 2015, Marnitz was appointed as the head coach of the Blue Bulls' Currie Cup team for the 2016 season.
