= De Wet Kruger =

South African rugby union player

- Born: 18 November 1991 (age 34) Randfontein, South Africa
- Height: 1.91 m (6 ft 3 in)
- Weight: 112 kg (17 st 9 lb; 247 lb)
- School: Oudtshoorn High School, Oudtshoorn
- Notable relative: Tertius Kruger (brother)

Rugby union career
- Position: Number eight / Flanker
- Current team: Griquas
Youth career
- 2010: Western Province
- 2011–2012: Free State U21
Amateur team(s)
Years	Team	Apps	(Points)
2013–2015	UFS Shimlas	4	(0)
Senior career
Years	Team	Apps	(Points)
2015	Free State Cheetahs	2	(5)
2016	Griffons	18	(40)
2017–present	Griquas	25	(25)
- Correct as of 16 July 2018

De Wet Kruger (born 18 November 1991) is a South African professional rugby union player for Griquas in the Currie Cup and in the Rugby Challenge. His regular position is number eight or flanker.

== Career ==
=== Western Province ===
After high school, Kruger joined the Western Province Rugby Institute for the 2010 season and made three starts for Western Province U19 during the 2010 Under-19 Provincial Championship. He featured during the regular season of the competition to help Western Province finish top of the log. They eventually won the competition, beating the Blue Bulls U19s 26–20 in the final in Durban.

=== Free State Cheetahs / UFS Shimlas ===
Kruger moved to Bloemfontein for the 2011 season. He was included in the Free State U21 squad for the 2011 Under-21 Provincial Championship, but failed to feature in any matches.

Kruger did play for the Under-21 side in the 2012 edition, however, making three appearances during the regular season as his side finished in fourth spot to claim the final semi-final berth. Kruger scored a try on the hour mark in their semi-final – just three minutes after coming on as a replacement – but it wasn't enough as eventual champions Blue Bulls U21 won the match 31–24.

Despite being included in the Free State XV squads that played in the Vodacom Cup in 2012 and 2013, Kruger didn't feature in any of those competitions and it wasn't until 2015 – after featuring in four matches for the UFS Shimlas in a 2015 Varsity Cup season that saw them crowned champions for the first time after beating the NWU Pukke 63–33 in the final – that Kruger made his first class debut; he was named in the Free State Cheetahs squad for the 2015 Currie Cup Premier Division and played off the bench in their 31–73 defeat to the Golden Lions. A week later, he was named in the starting line-up for the first time for their match against the Pumas in Nelspruit and Kruger also scored his first senior try, scoring ten minutes into the second half in a 37-all draw.

== Personal life ==
Kruger is the older brother of centre Tertius Kruger. They both played for the Free State Cheetahs in the 2015 Currie Cup; Tertius made his first class debut one week before De Wet and the two brothers featured in a match together when De Wet made his debut in their defeat to the Golden Lions.
