= Johann Wohler =

Namibia international rugby union player

- Born: 14 January 1985 (age 41) Rehoboth, South-West Africa
- Height: 1.76 m (5 ft 9 1/2 in)
- Weight: 105 kg (16 st 7 lb; 231 lb)
- School: Dr Lemmer High School
- University: Boston City Campus and Business College, Durban / Grootfontein Agricultural Development Institute

Rugby union career
- Position: Hooker
Amateur team(s)
Years	Team	Apps	(Points)
- Rehoboth
Senior career
Years	Team	Apps	(Points)
2016	Welwitschias	8	(5)
- Correct as of 9 October 2016
International career
Years	Team	Apps	(Points)
2004	Namibia Under-19		
2005	Namibia	2	(5)
- Correct as of 26 August 2016

Johann Wohler (born 14 January 1985) is a Namibian rugby union player. His regular position is hooker, but he can also play as a loose-forward.

== Rugby career ==
Wohler was born in Rehoboth, then in South-West Africa, but part of modern-day Namibia. He represented the Namibian Under-19 team at the Under 19 Rugby World Championship held in South Africa in 2004, and made two test appearances for Namibia in 2005, against Madagascar – where he scored a try – and Morocco. He also represented the Welwitschias in the South African domestic Currie Cup competitions since 2016.
