= Justin Nel =

Namibia international rugby union player

- Full name: Justin Alastair Nel
- Born: 14 February 1987 (age 39) Windhoek, Namibia
- Height: 1.86 m (6 ft 1 in)
- Weight: 80 kg (12 st 8 lb; 176 lb)
- School: Jan Möhr High School
- University: IITC Institute of Information and Technology

Rugby union career
- Position: Fullback
- Current team: Welwitschias
Senior career
Years	Team	Apps	(Points)
2011	Welwitschias	5	(0)
2015–present	Welwitschias	23	(26)
- Correct as of 22 July 2018
International career
Years	Team	Apps	(Points)
2010	Namibia national rugby sevens team		
2012–2016	Namibia	10	(20)
- Correct as of 26 August 2016

Justin Alastair Nel (born 14 February 1987) is a Namibian rugby union player for the Namibia national team and the Welwitschias in the Currie Cup and the Rugby Challenge. His regular position is fullback.

== Rugby career ==
Nel was born in Windhoek (then in South-West Africa, but part of modern-day Namibia). He played rugby sevens for Namibia, representing them at the 2010 South Africa Sevens. He made five appearances for the Welwitschias in the 2011 Vodacom Cup before they withdrew from the competition due to financial constraints.

He made his test debut for Namibia in 2012 against Senegal and represented the Welwitschias in the South African domestic Currie Cup and Vodacom Cup since their return to the competitions in 2015.
