= Peet van der Walt =

France rugby union player

- Full name: Andries Petrus van der Walt
- Born: 19 September 1991 (age 35) Kimberley, South Africa
- Height: 1.96 m (6 ft 5 in)
- Weight: 118 kg (18 st 8 lb; 260 lb)
- School: Outeniqua High School, George
- University: North-West University, Potchefstroom

Rugby union career
- Position: Lock / Flanker
- Current team: Aurillac
Youth career
- 2007–2009: SWD Eagles
- 2010–2012: Leopards
Amateur team(s)
Years	Team	Apps	(Points)
2014	NWU Pukke	7	(0)
Senior career
Years	Team	Apps	(Points)
2013	Leopards XV	5	(0)
2013	Leopards	12	(0)
2014–2017	SWD Eagles	32	(5)
2018–present	Aurillac	0	(0)
- Correct as of 29 May 2018

Andries Petrus van der Walt (born 19 September 1991), is a South African professional Aurillac rugby union player in the Rugby Pro D2. His regular position is lock, but has occasionally played as a flanker.

== Career ==
=== Youth ===
Van der Walt went to Outeniqua High School in George, where he earned a number of provincial call-ups to represent the SWD Eagles at various youth tournaments. He played for them at the Under-16 Grant Khomo Week in 2007, at the Under-18 Academy Week in 2008 and at the premier South African high school competition, the Under-18 Craven Week, in 2009.

=== Leopards ===
After finishing school, he went to North-West University in Potchefstroom. He represented the Potchefstroom-based provincial rugby union side the Leopards in the 2010 Under-19 Provincial Championship. Two years later, he also represented the Leopards U21 side in the 2012 Under-21 Provincial Championship, starting all twelve of their matches as they finished sixth out of seven teams.

He made his first class debut during the 2013 Vodacom Cup, starting their 15–45 Round One defeat to the Golden Lions in Johannesburg. He made a further three starts and one appearance off the bench as the Leopards finished in fifth spot, missing out on a semi-final tie on points difference.

He remained in their first team squad for their 2013 Currie Cup First Division campaign and made his Currie Cup debut as a replacement in their season-opening match against the Boland Cavaliers in Wellington in a 45–15 victory. After another appearance off the bench against the Falcons, he started his first Currie Cup match against the Eastern Province Kings in Port Elizabeth; his first of eight starts during the season and also played off the bench on four occasions.

After the 2013, Van der Walt's former provinceSWD Eagles announced that Van der Walt signed for them for the 2014 season. However, he remained in Potchefstroom to make seven starts for the NWU Pukke in the 2014 Varsity Cup competition – helping them reach their first ever final, which they lost 33–39 to the UCT Ikey Tigers in dramatic fashion after leading 33–15 with five minutes to go – prior to making the move back to George.

=== SWD Eagles ===
Van der Walt debuted for theSWD Eagles in their final match of the group stages of the 2014 Vodacom Cup, playing off the bench in a 23–14 victory over Western Province, a result that saw them leap-frog their opponents to finish in third place on the Northern Section log. He also appeared as a replacement in their quarter-final match, where his side were thoroughly outplayed, losing 15–84 to eventual champions Griquas.

The SWD Eagles then competed in the 2014 Currie Cup qualification competition, where the winner would qualify to play in the 2014 Currie Cup Premier Division. Van der Walt made three appearances – all off the bench – in this competition, but could only help his side finish in fourth spot to qualify to the 2014 Currie Cup First Division, where he made a further three appearances, including his first start for the SWD Eagles senior side against the Falcons in Kempton Park.

=== Aurillac ===
Van der Walt moved to French Pro D2 side Aurillac prior to the 2018–19 season.
