= Shaun du Preez =

Namibian international rugby union player (born 1987)

- Full name: Shaun Vernon du Preez
- Born: 22 July 1987 (age 39) Karasburg, South West Africa
- Height: 1.87 m (6 ft 1 1/2 in)
- Weight: 110 kg (17 st 5 lb; 240 lb)
- School: Paarl Boys' High School, South Africa

Rugby union career
- Position: Prop / Hooker
Amateur team(s)
Years	Team	Apps	(Points)
- Wanderers
Senior career
Years	Team	Apps	(Points)
2015–2017	Welwitschias	22	(5)
- Correct as of 5 June 2018
International career
Years	Team	Apps	(Points)
2012–2017	Namibia	8	(0)
- Correct as of 22 July 2018

Shaun Vernon du Preez (born 22 July 1987) is a Namibian rugby union player, currently playing with the Namibia national team and the Welwitschias in the South African Currie Cup competition. He can play as a prop or a hooker.

== Rugby career ==
Du Preez was born in Karasburg (then in South West Africa, but part of modern-day Namibia) and attended Paarl Boys' High School in South Africa.

He made his test debut for Namibia in 2012 against Madagascar and represented the Welwitschias in the South African domestic Currie Cup and Vodacom Cup competitions since 2015.
