= Daniel Roberts (rugby union) =

South African rugby union player

- Full name: Daniel Cornelius Roberts
- Born: 20 January 1992 (age 34) Heidelberg, South Africa
- Height: 1.80 m (5 ft 11 in)
- Weight: 86 kg (13 st 8 lb; 190 lb)
- School: PW Botha College, George

Rugby union career
- Position: Utility back
Youth career
- 2010–2013: SWD Eagles
Senior career
Years	Team	Apps	(Points)
2012–2016	SWD Eagles	59	(70)
- Correct as of 9 October 2016

Daniel Cornelius Roberts (born 20 January 1992) is a South African professional rugby union player, who most recently played with the SWD Eagles. He is a utility back that usually plays as a fly-half or fullback, but has also started matches as a centre and winger.

== Career ==
=== Youth ===
Roberts first earned a provincial call-up in 2010, when he was included in the SWD Eagles' Under-18 Academy Week squad. Later in the same year, he also featured for the SWD U19 side in the 2010 Under-19 Provincial Championship. He ended as their joint-second top scorer in the competition, helping them to third position on the log, a 37–29 victory against the Pumas U19 in the semi-final and a 27–20 victory over Falcons U19 in the final to win the competition. They also won promotion to Group A, beating the Griffons U19 in a promotion play-off.

Roberts was still eligible to represent newly promoted SWD U19 in Group A of the 2011 Under-19 Provincial Championship. He started all twelve of their matches during the campaign, but his side found it hard to adjust to the higher league, losing all twelve of their matches. He scored one try in their match against the Blue Bulls U19 and also played in their relegation play-off match against the Griffons U19, with SWD winning 18–14 to remain in Group A.

Roberts was named in the senior SWD Eagles squad for the 2012 Currie Cup First Division and was named on the bench for their match against the Boland Cavaliers, but failed to appear during the 21–21 draw. He made six appearances for SWD U21 during the 2012 Under-21 Provincial Championship, helping the side reach the final of the competition. He scored SWD U21s' only try of the match as they lost 10–24 to Eastern Province U21 in the final in Port Elizabeth.

=== SWD Eagles ===
His first class debut came during the 2013 Vodacom Cup competition; he came on as a replacement in their 10–52 loss to the Eastern Province Kings and also appeared against Western Province a week later.

Despite still being eligible to play for the SWD U21 side in the second half of 2013, he broke into the first team picture during the 2013 Currie Cup First Division. He made his Currie Cup debut – and first start at first class level – for the side in their 36–12 victory against the Border Bulldogs in East London in the opening round of the competition. He made a total of eight appearances during the competition as his side clinched a semi-final spot, where they lost to the Pumas.

Roberts was mainly used as a centre during the 2014 Vodacom Cup, starting all eight of the SWD Eagles' matches in the competition. He scored his first senior try in the second minute of their Round Two clash with Kenyan side Simba XV and followed it up with his second an hour later. He scored a third try in their match against Western Province to end the season in third spot on the log to claim a quarter final spot. They were eliminated at that stage by Griquas who ran out comfortable 84–15 winners.

Roberts then played in the 2014 Currie Cup qualification series, a competition which would reward the winner with a spot in the 2014 Currie Cup Premier Division. Roberts made four appearances and scored a try in their match against Boland Cavaliers, but his side could only finish in fourth spot to play in the 2014 Currie Cup First Division. He made five appearances in that competition, getting a brace of tries in their 31–22 victory over the Border Bulldogs. The SWD Eagles finished third to reach the semi-finals, where they lost 43–45 to eventual champions the Griffons.

Two appearances followed in the 2015 Vodacom Cup, where his side again reached the quarter-final stage.
