= Russell van Wyk =

Namibia international rugby union player

- Full name: Russell Steven van Wyk
- Born: 12 August 1990 (age 36) Tsumeb, Namibia
- Height: 1.80 m (5 ft 11 in)
- Weight: 87 kg (13 st 10 lb; 192 lb)
- School: Jan Mohr Secondary School, Windhoek
- University: Central University of Technology, Bloemfontein

Rugby union career
- Position: Winger / Fullback
- Current team: Welwitschias
Youth career
- 2006–2008: Namibia
- 2009: Free State U19
- 2010–2011: Griquas U21
- 2011: Free State U21
Amateur team(s)
Years	Team	Apps	(Points)
2012	CUT Ixias	3	(0)
Senior career
Years	Team	Apps	(Points)
2010–2011	Welwitschias	3	(0)
2013	Falcons	11	(5)
2015–present	Welwitschias	23	(25)
- Correct as of 22 July 2018
International career
Years	Team	Apps	(Points)
2015–2016	Namibia	9	(36)
- Correct as of 22 July 2018

Russell Steven van Wyk (born 12 August 1990) is a rugby union wingerfor the Namibia national team and the Welwitschias in the Currie Cup and the Rugby Challenge. Van Wyk made his debut for the Namibia in 2015 and was part of the squad at the 2015 Rugby World Cup.
