= Henko Marais =

- Full name: Hendrik Jacobus Marais
- Born: 18 June 1993 (age 33) Lichtenburg, South Africa
- Height: 1.86 m (6 ft 1 in)
- Weight: 99 kg (218 lb; 15 st 8 lb)
- School: Hoër Volkskool Potchefstroom
- University: North-West University

Rugby union career
- Position: Centre
- Current team: Enisei-STM
Youth career
- 2011–2012: Leopards
Senior career
Years	Team	Apps	(Points)
2015	Leopards XV	1	(0)
2016–2017	Leopards	18	(35)
2018–2019	Pumas	23	(15)
2019-present	Enisei-STM	2	(0)
- Correct as of 28 December 2019

Hendrik Jacobus Marais (born 18 June 1993) is a South African rugby union player for the Russian club Enisei-STM in the European Rugby Challenge Cup. His regular position is centre.
