= 2016 Currie Cup First Division =

Domestic rugby union competition

- Countries: South Africa
- Date: 12 August – 7 October 2016
- Champions: Griffons (3rd title)
- Runners-up: Leopards
- Matches played: 18
- Tries scored: 173 (average 9.6 per match)
- Top point scorer: George Whitehead (125)
- Top try scorer: Gene Willemse (8)

The 2016 Currie Cup First Division was the second tier of the second stage of the 2016 Currie Cup, the 78th edition of this annual South African rugby union competition organised by the South African Rugby Union. It was played between 12 August and 7 October 2016 and featured six teams that qualified through the 2016 Currie Cup qualification competition. The tournament was won by the Griffons for the third time in their history; they beat the Leopards 44–25 in the final played on 7 October 2016.

== Competition rules and information ==
There were six participating teams in the 2016 Currie Cup First Division.

=== Qualification ===
The six franchise teams automatically qualified to the 2016 Currie Cup Premier Division, and were joined by the three highest-placed non-franchise teams from the 2016 Currie Cup qualification stage. The remaining six teams from the qualification stage qualified for the Currie Cup First Division.

=== Regular season and title playoffs ===
The six teams that qualified for the First Division played against each other over the course of the competition, either at home or away. Teams received four points for a win and two points for a draw. Bonus points were awarded to teams that scored 4 or more tries in a game, as well as to teams that lost a match by 7 points or less. Teams were ranked by log points, then points difference (points scored less points conceded).

The top four teams qualified for the semifinals, which were followed by a final.

== Teams ==
Location of teams in the 2016 Currie Cup First Division competition

The teams that competed in the 2016 Currie Cup First Division were:

2016 Currie Cup First Division teams
Team	Sponsored Name	Stadium/s	Sponsored Name
Border Bulldogs	Border Bulldogs	Buffalo City Stadium, East London	Buffalo City Stadium
Falcons	Hino Valke	Barnard Stadium, Kempton Park	Barnard Stadium
Griffons	Down Touch Griffons	North West Stadium, Welkom	HT Pelatona Projects Stadium
Leopards	Leopards	Olën Park, Potchefstroom	Profert Olën Park
SWD Eagles	SWD Eagles	Outeniqua Park, George	Outeniqua Park
Welwitschias	Windhoek Draught Welwitschias	Hage Geingob Stadium, Windhoek	Hage Geingob Stadium

== Standings ==
The final log for the 2016 Currie Cup First Division is:

2016 Currie Cup First Division log
Pos	Team	Pld	W	D	L	PF	PA	PD	TF	TA	TB	LB	Pts	Qualification
1	Leopards	5	5	0	0	214	149	+65	31	23	5	0	25	Semi-finals
2	Border Bulldogs	5	4	0	1	211	110	+101	31	15	5	1	22	Semi-finals
3	Griffons	5	3	0	2	224	163	+61	29	23	3	0	15	Semi-finals
4	Falcons	5	2	0	3	159	198	−39	26	27	4	0	12	Semi-finals
5	SWD Eagles	5	1	0	4	168	170	−2	23	22	3	3	10	
6	Welwitschias	5	0	0	5	117	303	−186	15	45	2	0	2	

Rules for classification: 4 points for a win; 2 points for a draw; 1 bonus point for a loss by seven points or less; 1 bonus point for scoring four or more tries in a match

=== Round-by-round ===
The table below shows a team's progression throughout the season. For each round, each team's cumulative points total is shown with the overall log position in brackets.

Team Progression – 2016 Currie Cup First Division
Team	R1	R2	R3	R4	R5	R6	SF	F
Leopards	5 (3rd)	10 (1st)	15 (1st)	20 (1st)	25 (1st)	25 (1st)	Won	Lost
Border Bulldogs	2 (4th)	2 (4th)	7 (4th)	12 (2nd)	17 (2nd)	22 (2nd)	Lost	—
Griffons	5 (2nd)	9 (2nd)	10 (2nd)	10 (3rd)	15 (3rd)	15 (3rd)	Won	Won
Falcons	1 (5th)	1 (5th)	6 (5th)	6 (5th)	7 (5th)	12 (4th)	Lost	—
SWD Eagles	5 (1st)	6 (3rd)	8 (3rd)	8 (4th)	9 (4th)	10 (5th)	—	—
Welwitschias	0 (6th)	1 (6th)	1 (6th)	1 (6th)	2 (6th)	2 (6th)	—	—
Key:	win	draw	loss	bye				

== Matches ==
Five rounds of matches were played, followed by semi-finals and the final.

=== Round one ===
12 August 2016	Griffons	50–27	Falcons	HT Pelatona Projects Stadium, Welkom
15:45	Try: Vuyo Mbotho 9', 51', 80'; Elandré Huggett 36'; Martin Sithole 38'; Selvyn Davids 47', 63'; Con: George Whitehead 37', 39', 48', 52', 64', 81' (6/7); Pen: George Whitehead 7' (1/2); Cards: Elandré Huggett (yellow card) 73'	Report; Scoreboard	Try: Etienne Taljaard 1', 19'; Charlie Mayeza 23'; Marlyn Williams 75'; Con: Karlo Aspeling 2', 24' (2/4); Pen: Karlo Aspeling 33' (1/1)	Attendance: 1,500; Referee: Quinton Immelman

12 August 2016	Leopards	26–24	Border Bulldogs	Olën Park, Potchefstroom
17:00	Try: Bart le Roux 3', 50'; Gene Willemse 38'; HP Swart 47'; Con: Malherbe Swart 39', 48', 51' (3/4)	Report; Scoreboard	Try: Athenkosi Manentsa 5'; Sipho Nofemele 35'; Masixole Banda 58'; Michael Makase 69'; Con: Masixole Banda 6', 70' (2/4); Pen: Masixole Banda (0/2)	Attendance: 200; Referee: AJ Jacobs

12 August 2016	SWD Eagles	54–23	Welwitschias	Outeniqua Park, George
17:00	Try: Andisa Ntsila 1'; Thor Halvorsen 26'; Johan Steyn 37'; Mark Pretorius 43', 63'; Christo du Plessis 57'; Dillin Snel 65' penalty try 76'; Con: Hansie Graaff 27', 38', 44', 58', 64', 66', 77' (7/8)	Report; Scoreboard	Try: Gert Lotter 46'; Lesley Klim 81'; Con: Eugene Jantjies 47', 82' (2/2); Pen: Eugene Jantjies 18', 25', 39' (3/5); Cards: Gert Lotter (yellow card) 36' to 46'	Referee: Sindile Ngcese

=== Round two ===
19 August 2016	SWD Eagles	27–33	Griffons	Outeniqua Park, George
17:00	Try: Christo du Plessis 3'; Johan Steyn 29'; Mark Pretorius 31'; Con: Hansie Graaff 4', 30', 32' (3/3); Pen: Hansie Graaff 45', 70' (2/2); Cards: Charles Radebe (yellow card) 64' to 74'	Report; Scoreboard	Try: Boela Abrahams 42'; Reinhardt Erwee 52' penalty try 64'; Con: George Whitehead 43', 53', 65' (3/3); Pen: George Whitehead 2', 8', 35' (3/3); Drop: Boela Abrahams 20' (1/1); Cards: Vincent Maruping (yellow card) 30' to 41'	Referee: Egon Seconds

20 August 2016	Welwitschias	42–54	Leopards	Hage Geingob Stadium, Windhoek
16:00	Try: Philip Nashikaku 19'; Leneve Damens 21'; Gino Wilson 24'; Chrysander Botha 46'; Lesley Klim 56', 80'; Con: Eugene Jantjies 20', 22', 25', 47', 57', 81' (6/6); Cards: Cameron Klassen (yellow card) 39' to 50'	Report; Scoreboard	Try: HP Swart 4'; Gene Willemse 6', 28', 41'; Loftus Morrison 12'; Johan Deysel 37', 75'; Rowayne Beukman 70'; Con: Johan Deysel 7', 13', 29', 38', 42', 71', 76' (7/8)	Attendance: 800; Referee: AJ Jacobs

Bye/s: Border Bulldogs, Falcons

=== Round three ===
26 August 2016	Leopards	43–33	Griffons	Olën Park, Potchefstroom
15:00	Try: HP Swart 4', 11', 44'; Bradley Moolman 16'; Loftus Morrison 37'; Francois Robertse 61'; Con: Johan Deysel 5', 12', 17', 38', 62' (5/6); Pen: Johan Deysel 26' (1/2); Cards: Jaco Jordaan (yellow card) 55' to 65'; Loftus Morrison (yellow card) 73'	Scoreboard	Try: George Whitehead 15'; Warren Williams 23'; Boela Venter 33'; Martin Sithole 56'; Japie Nel 76'; Con: George Whitehead 15', 34', 57', 77' (4/5); Cards: Dennis Visser (yellow card) 14' to 24'	Attendance: 500; Referee: Rodney Boneparte

26 August 2016	Border Bulldogs	61–7	Welwitschias	Buffalo City Stadium, East London
19:00	Try: Sonwabiso Mqalo 1', 25'; Sino Nyoka 8'; Onke Dubase 19'; Sipho Nofemele 21', 67'; Makazole Mapimpi 35'; Masixole Banda 45'; Oliver Zono 62'; Con: Masixole Banda 2', 9', 20', 22', 26', 36', 63', 68' (8/9); Cards: Soso Xakalashe (red card) 80'	Scoreboard	Try: Lesley Klim 29'; Con: Eugene Jantjies 30' (1/1)	Attendance: 1,500; Referee: Egon Seconds

27 August 2016	Falcons	34–32	SWD Eagles	Barnard Stadium, Kempton Park
15:00	Try: Coert Cronjé 3'; Jan Enslin 23'; Friedle Olivier 30', 61'; Johan Pretorius 38'; Reg Muller 79'; Con: Karlo Aspeling 4', 39' (2/5); Warren Potgieter (0/1)	Report; Scoreboard	Try: Janneman Stander 14'; Andisa Ntsila 42'; Hentzwill Pedro 55'; Charles Radebe 72'; Con: Hansie Graaff 15', 43', 56' (3/4); Pen: Hansie Graaff 19', 50' (2/4); Cards: Nemo Roelofse (yellow card) 78'	Attendance: 400; Referee: Jaco van Heerden

=== Round four ===
2 September 2016	Border Bulldogs	41–24	Griffons	Buffalo City Stadium, East London
19:00	Try: Oliver Zono 3', 24'; Onke Dubase 17'; Masixole Banda 52'; Sipho Nofemele 72'; Michael Makase 75'; Con: Masixole Banda 4', 18', 25', 76' (4/6); Pen: Masixole Banda 26' (1/1); Cards: Lunga Dumezweni (yellow card) 61'	Report; Scoreboard	Try: Japie Nel 14'; Gavin Annandale 31'; Con: George Whitehead 32' (1/2); Pen: George Whitehead 42', 46', 49', 61' (4/4)	Referee: Jaco Peyper

3 September 2016	Falcons	19–42	Leopards	Barnard Stadium, Kempton Park
15:00	Try: Andries Schutte 28'; Xander Cronjé 58'; Johan Pretorius 64'; Con: Warren Potgieter (0/1); Karlo Aspeling 59', 65' (2/2)	Report; Scoreboard	Try: Gene Willemse 2', 11'; Bradley Moolman 23'; Johan Deysel 41'; HP Swart 62'; Adrian Vermeulen 77'; Con: Johan Deysel 3', 12', 24', 42', 63' (5/5); Johnny Welthagen 78' (1/1)	Referee: AJ Jacobs

Bye/s: SWD Eagles, Welwitschias

=== Round Five ===
9 September 2016	Falcons	29–54	Border Bulldogs	Barnard Stadium, Kempton Park
15:30	Try: Etienne Taljaard 2'; Charlie Mayeza 26'; Andrew van Wyk 38'; Damian Engledoe 43'; Anrich Richter 53'; Con: Karlo Aspeling 3', 27' (2/5)	Report; Scoreboard	Try: Lunga Dumezweni 6'; Masixole Banda 13', 47'; Ndzondelelo Gemashe 35'; Lindokuhle Welemu 51'; Makazole Mapimpi 67'; Sonwabiso Mqalo 70'; Sipho Nofemele 74'; Con: Masixole Banda 7', 36', 48', 52', 68', 71', 75' (7/8)	Attendance: 300; Referee: Cwengile Jadezweni

10 September 2016	Leopards	49–31	SWD Eagles	Olën Park, Potchefstroom
15:00	Try: Loftus Morrison 1'; Dean Gordon 12', 65'; Bradley Moolman 35'; Gene Willemse 42'; Adrian Vermeulen 47' penalty try 54'; Con: Johan Deysel 2', 13', 36', 43', 48', 54', 66' (7/7); Cards: Francois Robertse (yellow card) 77'	Report; Scoreboard	Try: Martin du Toit 56', 67'; Christo du Plessis 73'; Kurt Haupt 76'; Daniel Roberts 79'; Con: Leighton Eksteen 68', 74', 80' (3/5)	Attendance: 300; Referee: Alexandre Ruiz

10 September 2016	Griffons	84–25	Welwitschias	HT Pelatona Projects Stadium, Welkom
15:45	Try: De Wet Kruger 1', 28', 68'; Boela Venter 9'; Dennis Visser 12', 78'; Warren Williams 18', 20', 58', 73'; Reinhardt Erwee 65'; Danie van der Merwe 71'; Con: George Whitehead 2', 10', 13', 19', 21', 29', 59', 66', 69', 72', 74', 79' (12/12); Cards: Gerhard Engelbrecht (yellow card) 49' to 59'	Scoreboard	Try: Morné Blom 26'; Lesley Klim 34'; Shaun Kaizemi 54'; Malcolm Moore 80'; Con: Eugene Jantjies 35' (1/4); Pen: Eugene Jantjies 7' (1/1)	Attendance: 2,500; Referee: Quinton Immelman

=== Round Six ===
16 September 2016	Border Bulldogs	31–24	SWD Eagles	Buffalo City Stadium, East London
19:00	Try: Josh Kota 6'; Masixole Banda 36'; Athenkosi Khethani 72'; Onke Dubase 75'; Con: Masixole Banda 7', 37', 73', 76' (4/4); Pen: Masixole Banda 27' (1/2)	Report; Scoreboard	Try: Kurt Haupt 1', 38'; Luzuko Vulindlu 16'; Con: Tom Kean (0/3); Pen: Tom Kean 30', 53', 65' (3/3); Cards: Thor Halvorsen (yellow card) 77'	Referee: Mike Adamson

17 September 2016	Welwitschias	20–50	Falcons	Hage Geingob Stadium, Windhoek
16:00	Try: Eugene Jantjies 52', 68'; Con: Eugene Jantjies 53', 69' (2/2); Pen: Eugene Jantjies 11', 28' (2/2); Cards: Rohan Kitshoff (yellow card) 39' to 50'; Nian Berg (yellow card) 76'	Report; Scoreboard	Try: Charlie Mayeza 17', 54'; Reg Muller 34'; Johan Pretorius 36', 41'; Etienne Taljaard 49'; Anrich Richter 66'; Andries Truter 80'; Con: Karlo Aspeling 35', 37', 50' (3/6); Warren Potgieter 67', 81' (2/2); Cards: Reg Muller (yellow card) 39' to 50'; JP Mostert (yellow card) 69' to 80'; Dwight Pansegrouw (yellow card) 72'	Referee: Rodney Boneparte

Bye/s: Griffons, Leopards

=== Semi-finals ===
30 September 2016	Leopards	40–30	Falcons	Olën Park, Potchefstroom
17:00	Try: Jaco Jordaan 14'; Johan Deysel 19'; Bradley Moolman 27'; Dean Gordon 38'; Gene Willemse 48'; Con: Johan Deysel 20', 39', 49' (3/5); Pen: Johan Deysel 18', 43', 77' (3/4)	Report; Scoreboard	Try: Marlyn Williams 22'; Johan Pretorius 50', 61'; Con: Karlo Aspeling 23', 51' (2/2); Warren Potgieter 62' (1/1); Pen: Karlo Aspeling 32', 36' (2/2); Warren Potgieter 69' (1/1)	Referee: Jaco van Heerden

30 September 2016	Border Bulldogs	16–25	Griffons	Buffalo City Stadium, East London
19:00	Try: Makazole Mapimpi 59'; Con: Masixole Banda 60' (1/1); Pen: Masixole Banda 5', 19', 33' (3/4)	Report; Scoreboard	Try: Danie van der Merwe 6'; Con: George Whitehead 7' (1/1); Pen: George Whitehead 9', 13', 39', 42', 45', 77' (6/6); Drop: George Whitehead (0/1); Cards: Tertius Kruger (yellow card) 33' to 43'	Attendance: 3,000; Referee: Pro Legoete

=== Final ===
7 October 2016	Leopards	25–44	Griffons	Olën Park, Potchefstroom
16:00	Try: Adrian Vermeulen 28'; Jaco Hayward 44'; Johan Deysel 77'; Con: Johan Deysel 45', 78' (2/3); Pen: Johan Deysel 2', 38' (2/3); Cards: Jeandré Rudolph (yellow card) 50' to 60'; Gene Willemse (yellow card) 70'	Report; Scoreboard	Try: George Whitehead 9'; Selvyn Davids 40'; Tertius Kruger 60', 79' penalty try 69'; Con: George Whitehead 10', 40', 61', 70', 80' (5/5); Pen: George Whitehead 26', 33', 51' (3/5); Drop: George Whitehead (0/2)	Referee: Quinton Immelman

== Honours ==
The honour roll for the 2016 Currie Cup First Division was as follows:

2016 Currie Cup First Division
Champions:	Griffons
Top Points Scorer:	George Whitehead, Griffons (125)
Top Try Scorer:	Gene Willemse, Leopards (8)

== Players ==
=== Squads ===
The following squads were named for the 2016 Currie Cup First Division:

Border Bulldogs squad
Forwards	Phumlani Blaauw • Onke Dubase • Billy Dutton • Ndzondelelo Gemashe • Johannes Janse van Rensburg • Johannes Jonker • Athenkosi Khethani • Josh Kota • Blake Kyd • Athenkosi Manentsa • Siya Mdaka • Mihlali Mpafi • Siyamthanda Ngande • Nkosi Nofuma • Lukhanyo Nomzanga • Hendri Storm • Lindokuhle Welemu • Soso Xakalashe • Yanga Xakalashe
Backs	Masixole Banda • Lunga Dumezweni • Bangi Kobese • Michael Makase • Makazole Mapimpi • Sonwabiso Mqalo • Sipho Nofemele • Sino Nyoka • Lundi Ralarala • Sethu Tom • Oliver Zono
Coach	David Dobela • Elliot Fana

Falcons squad
Forwards	Jacques Alberts • Henri Boshoff • Isak Deetlefs • Heinrich Els • Jan Enslin • Shane Kirkwood • Ernst Ladendorf • Thabo Mamojele • JP Mostert • Reg Muller • Friedle Olivier • Dwight Pansegrouw • Andries Schutte • Koos Strauss • Gihard Visagie • Grant Watts • Marlyn Williams
Backs	Karlo Aspeling • Coert Cronjé • Xander Cronjé • Damian Engledoe • Kyle Hendricks • Grant Janke • Charlie Mayeza • Warren Potgieter • Johan Pretorius • Anrich Richter • Etienne Taljaard • Andries Truter • Andrew van Wyk • Did not play: • Christo Coetzee
Coach	Rudy Joubert

Griffons squad
Forwards	Gavin Annandale • PW Botha • Rudi Britz • Gerhard Engelbrecht • Samora Fihlani • Elandré Huggett • De Wet Kruger • George Marich • Vincent Maruping • Khwezi Mkhafu • Heinrich Roelfse • Boela Serfontein • Martin Sithole • Danie van der Merwe • Boela Venter • Hennie Venter • Dennis Visser
Backs	Boela Abrahams • Selvyn Davids • Joubert Engelbrecht • Reinhardt Erwee • Tertius Kruger • Tertius Maarman • Vuyo Mbotho • Japie Nel • Duan Pretorius • Louis Venter • George Whitehead • Warren Williams
Coach	Oersond Gorgonzola

Leopards squad
Forwards	Wilmar Arnoldi • Dewald Dekker • Roan Grobbelaar • Danie Jordaan • Jaco Jordaan • Juan Language • Bart le Roux • Stairs Mhlongo • Loftus Morrison • Kabelo Motloung • Lucky Ngcamu • Marno Redelinghuys • Francois Robertse • Jeandré Rudolph • Walt Steenkamp • HP Swart • Louis van der Westhuizen • Dane van der Westhuyzen
Backs	Rowayne Beukman • Myburgh Briers • Johan Deysel • Dean Gordon • Jaco Hayward • Sandile Kubheka • Bradley Moolman • Chriswill September • Malherbe Swart • Adrian Vermeulen • Johnny Welthagen • Ryno Wepener • Gene Willemse
Coach	Jonathan Mokeuna

SWD Eagles squad
Forwards	Layle Delo • Juandré Digue • Christo du Plessis • Thor Halvorsen • Lyndon Hartnick • Kurt Haupt • Dean Hopp • Marco Kruger • Grant le Roux • Teunis Nieuwoudt • Andisa Ntsila • Schalk Oelofse • Buran Parks • Mark Pretorius • Davon Raubenheimer • Nemo Roelofse • Janneman Stander • Lodewyk Uys
Backs	Riaan Arends • Martin du Toit • Mzo Dyantyi • Leighton Eksteen • Wilneth Engelbrecht • Hansie Graaff • Kirsten Heyns • Jacquin Jansen • Tom Kean • Hentzwill Pedro • Charles Radebe • Daniel Roberts • Dillin Snel • Johan Steyn • Luzuko Vulindlu • Clinton Wagman
Coach	Deon Davids

Welwitschias squad
Forwards	Nian Berg • Morné Blom • Petri Burger • Leneve Damens • AJ de Klerk • Shaun du Preez • Alberto Engelbrecht • Quintin Esterhuizen • Zayne Groenewaldt • Thomas Kali • Munio Kasiringua • Rohan Kitshoff • Gert Lotter • Ruan Ludick • Collen Smith • Denzil van Wyk • Hauta Veii • Casper Viviers • Johann Wohler
Backs	Chrysander Botha • Darryl de la Harpe • Eugene Jantjies • Shaun Kaizemi • Nandivatu Karuuombe • Cameron Klassen • Lesley Klim • Malcolm Moore • Philip Nashikaku • Justin Nel • Mahco Prinsloo • Heinrich Smit • Russell van Wyk • Riaan van Zyl • Francois Wiese • Gino Wilson • JC Winckler
Coach	John Williams

=== Appearances and points ===
Border Bulldogs
Name	LEO	WEL	GRF	GFA	SWD	SF	F	App	Try	Kck	Pts
Blake Kyd	1	1	1	1	3	1	—	6	0	0	0
Mihlali Mpafi	2	2	2	2	16 (substituted in)	2	—	6	0	0	0
Johannes Jonker	3		3	3		3	—	4	0	0	0
Lindokuhle Welemu	4	4	4	4		4	—	5	1	0	5
Hendri Storm	5	5	5	5	5	5	—	6	0	0	0
Onke Dubase	6	6	6	6	6	6	—	6	3	0	15
Siya Mdaka	7	7	7			7	—	4	0	0	0
Athenkosi Manentsa	8						—	1	1	0	5
Sino Nyoka	9	9	9	20 (substituted in)	20 (substituted in)	20 (substituted in)	—	6	1	0	5
Masixole Banda	10	10	15	15	10	15	—	6	6	67	97
Makazole Mapimpi	11	11	11	11	11	11	—	6	3	0	15
Lunga Dumezweni	12	12	12	12	21 (substituted in)	12	—	6	1	0	5
Lundi Ralarala	13	13	13	13	13	13	—	6	0	0	0
Sipho Nofemele	14	14	14	14	14	14	—	6	5	0	25
Sonwabiso Mqalo	15	15		22 (substituted in)	15	22 (substituted in)	—	5	3	0	15
Josh Kota	16 (substituted in)	16 (substituted in)	16	16 (substituted in)	2	16	—	4	1	0	5
Siyamthanda Ngande	17 (substituted in)	18 (substituted in)			1	17 (substituted in)	—	4	0	0	0
Nkosi Nofuma	18 (substituted in)						—	1	0	0	0
Billy Dutton	19 (substituted in)		19 (substituted in)		7	18 (substituted in)	—	4	0	0	0
Bangi Kobese	20 (substituted in)	20 (substituted in)	20 (substituted in)	9	9	9	—	6	0	0	0
Oliver Zono	21 (substituted in)	22 (substituted in)	10	10		10	—	5	3	0	15
Michael Makase	22 (substituted in)		22 (substituted in)		22 (substituted in)		—	3	2	0	10
Phumlani Blaauw		3			18 (substituted in)		—	2	0	0	0
Johannes Janse van Rensburg		8	8	7	8	8	—	5	0	0	0
Yanga Xakalashe		17 (substituted in)	17 (substituted in)	17 (substituted in)	17 (substituted in)		—	4	0	0	0
Athenkosi Khethani		19 (substituted in)	18 (substituted in)	18 (substituted in)	4		—	4	1	0	5
Soso Xakalashe		21 (substituted in)					—	1	0	0	0
Sethu Tom			21 (substituted in)	21 (substituted in)	12	21 (substituted in)	—	4	0	0	0
Ndzondelelo Gemashe				8			—	1	1	0	5
Lukhanyo Nomzanga				19 (substituted in)	19 (substituted in)	19 (substituted in)	—	3	0	0	0
Total								6	32	67	227

Falcons
Name	GRF	SWD	LEO	BDR	WEL	SF	F	App	Try	Kck	Pts
Koos Strauss	1	1	1	1		1	—	5	0	0	0
Henri Boshoff	2		17 (substituted in)	17 (substituted in)	1		—	4	0	0	0
Andries Schutte	3	3	3	3	3	3	—	6	1	0	5
Shane Kirkwood	4	4	4	4		4	—	5	0	0	0
Isak Deetlefs	5	18 (substituted in)	18 (substituted in)		4		—	4	0	0	0
JP Mostert	6	6	6	6	19 (substituted in)	6	—	6	0	0	0
Ernst Ladendorf	7	7		19 (substituted in)	7	7	—	5	0	0	0
Friedle Olivier	8	8	7	7		19 (substituted in)	—	5	2	0	10
Johan Pretorius	9	9	9	9	9	9	—	6	6	0	30
Karlo Aspeling	10	10	20 (substituted in)	10	10	10	—	6	0	35	35
Etienne Taljaard	11		11	11	11	11	—	5	5	0	25
Andrew van Wyk	12	12	12	12		22 (substituted in)	—	5	1	0	5
Andries Truter	13	11			13	13	—	4	0	0	0
Charlie Mayeza	14	14	14	14	14	14	—	6	4	0	20
Coert Cronjé	15	15	15			15	—	4	1	0	5
Dwight Pansegrouw	16 (substituted in)	16 (substituted in)	16	16 (substituted in)	16 (substituted in)	16 (substituted in)	—	5	0	0	0
Grant Watts	17 (substituted in)				17 (substituted in)		—	2	0	0	0
Marlyn Williams	18 (substituted in)	5	5	5	5	5	—	6	2	0	10
Reg Muller	19 (substituted in)	19 (substituted in)	8	8	8	8	—	6	2	0	10
Warren Potgieter	20 (substituted in)	20 (substituted in)	10	21 (substituted in)	21 (substituted in)	21 (substituted in)	—	6	0	9	9
Grant Janke	21 (substituted in)	13	13	13	12	12	—	6	0	0	0
Damian Engledoe	22 (substituted in)		22 (substituted in)	15			—	3	1	0	5
Jan Enslin		2	2	2		2	—	4	1	0	5
Heinrich Els		17 (substituted in)					—	1	0	0	0
Xander Cronjé		21 (substituted in)	21 (substituted in)	22 (substituted in)	22 (substituted in)		—	4	1	0	5
Christo Coetzee		22					—	0	0	0	0
Thabo Mamojele			19 (substituted in)		6		—	2	0	0	0
Jacques Alberts				18 (substituted in)	18 (substituted in)	18 (substituted in)	—	3	0	0	0
Anrich Richter				20 (substituted in)	20 (substituted in)	20 (substituted in)	—	3	2	0	10
Gihard Visagie					2	17 (substituted in)	—	2	0	0	0
Kyle Hendricks					15		—	1	0	0	0
Total								6	29	44	189

Griffons
Name	GFA	SWD	LEO	BDR	WEL	SF	F	App	Try	Kck	Pts
Danie van der Merwe	1	1	1	1	1	1	1	7	2	0	10
Elandré Huggett	2	2	2	2		16 (substituted in)	16 (substituted in)	6	1	0	5
Gerhard Engelbrecht	3	3	3	3	3	3	3	7	0	0	0
Gavin Annandale	4	4	4	4	4	4	4	7	1	0	5
Dennis Visser	5		5	5	5	5	5	6	2	0	10
Martin Sithole	6	6	19 (substituted in)	19 (substituted in)	19 (substituted in)	19 (substituted in)	8	7	2	0	10
Vincent Maruping	7	7	6	6	6	6	6	7	0	0	0
De Wet Kruger	8	8	8	8	8	8		6	3	0	15
Boela Abrahams	9	9	9	9	9	9	9	7	1	3	8
George Whitehead	10	10	10	10	10	10	10	7	2	115	125
Warren Williams	11	21 (substituted in)	11	11	11	11	11	7	5	0	25
Joubert Engelbrecht	12	12	12	13	13	21 (substituted in)	22 (substituted in)	7	0	0	0
Tertius Kruger	13	13	13	22 (substituted in)	22 (substituted in)	13	13	7	2	0	10
Vuyo Mbotho	14	11	14	14	14	14	14	7	3	0	15
Selvyn Davids	15	14	15	15		15	15	6	3	0	15
Khwezi Mkhafu	16 (substituted in)	16 (substituted in)	16 (substituted in)	16 (substituted in)	2	2	2	7	0	0	0
PW Botha	17 (substituted in)							1	0	0	0
George Marich	18 (substituted in)	17 (substituted in)			17 (substituted in)			3	0	0	0
Boela Serfontein	19 (substituted in)	5	18	18 (substituted in)	18 (substituted in)		18 (substituted in)	5	0	0	0
Louis Venter	20 (substituted in)	20	20 (substituted in)	20 (substituted in)	20 (substituted in)	20 (substituted in)	21 (substituted in)	6	0	0	0
Tertius Maarman	21 (substituted in)			21 (substituted in)				2	0	0	0
Japie Nel	22 (substituted in)	22 (substituted in)	22 (substituted in)	12	12	12	12	7	2	0	10
Reinhardt Erwee		15			21 (substituted in)			2	2	0	10
Samora Fihlani		18				18 (substituted in)	19 (substituted in)	2	0	0	0
Boela Venter		19 (substituted in)	7	7	7	7	7	6	2	0	10
Rudi Britz			17 (substituted in)	17 (substituted in)				2	0	0	0
Duan Pretorius			21 (substituted in)		15	22	20 (substituted in)	3	0	0	0
Hennie Venter					16 (substituted in)			1	0	0	0
Heinrich Roelfse						17 (substituted in)	17 (substituted in)	2	0	0	0
penalty try								–	2	–	10
Total								7	35	118	293

Leopards
Name	BDR	WEL	GRF	GFA	SWD	SF	F	App	Try	Kck	Pts
Bart le Roux	1	3	17 (substituted in)					3	2	0	10
Wilmar Arnoldi	2	16			16 (substituted in)	16 (substituted in)		3	0	0	0
Lucky Ngcamu	3			17 (substituted in)				2	0	0	0
Stairs Mhlongo	4	4			4	4	4	5	0	0	0
Walt Steenkamp	5	18 (substituted in)	5	5		5	5	6	0	0	0
Juan Language	6				6		6	3	0	0	0
HP Swart	7	7	7	19 (substituted in)		7	7	6	6	0	30
Marno Redelinghuys	8	8	19 (substituted in)		19 (substituted in)	20 (substituted in)	19 (substituted in)	6	0	0	0
Malherbe Swart	9	20 (substituted in)	20 (substituted in)	20 (substituted in)	9	21 (substituted in)	9	7	0	6	6
Gene Willemse	10	10	10	10	10	10	10	7	8	0	40
Jaco Hayward	11	11	15	15	15	15	15	7	1	0	5
Johan Deysel	12	12	12	12	12	12	12	7	5	76	101
Bradley Moolman	13		11	11	11	11	11	6	4	0	20
Rowayne Beukman	14	14	14					3	1	0	5
Ryno Wepener	15	15	22 (substituted in)	22 (substituted in)	22 (substituted in)			5	0	0	0
Dane van der Westhuyzen	16 (substituted in)	2	2	2		2	2	6	0	0	0
Roan Grobbelaar	17 (substituted in)	1	1	1	1	1	1	7	0	0	0
Loftus Morrison	18 (substituted in)	5	4	7	7	19 (substituted in)		6	3	0	15
Jaco Jordaan	19 (substituted in)	6	6	6		6	22 (substituted in)	6	1	0	5
Chriswill September	20 (substituted in)	9	9	9	20 (substituted in)	9	20 (substituted in)	7	0	0	0
Adrian Vermeulen	21 (substituted in)	13	13	13	13	13	13	7	3	0	15
Myburgh Briers	22 (substituted in)	21 (substituted in)						2	0	0	0
Dewald Dekker		17 (substituted in)	3	3	3	3	3	6	0	0	0
Francois Robertse		19 (substituted in)	18 (substituted in)	4	5	18 (substituted in)	18 (substituted in)	6	1	0	5
Sandile Kubheka		22 (substituted in)	21 (substituted in)	14	21 (substituted in)	22	21 (substituted in)	5	0	0	0
Jeandré Rudolph			8	8	8	8	8	5	0	0	0
Louis van der Westhuizen			16 (substituted in)	16 (substituted in)	2		16 (substituted in)	4	0	0	0
Danie Jordaan				18 (substituted in)	18 (substituted in)			2	0	0	0
Johnny Welthagen				21 (substituted in)				1	0	2	2
Dean Gordon					14	14	14	3	3	0	15
Kabelo Motloung					17 (substituted in)	17 (substituted in)	17 (substituted in)	3	0	0	0
penalty try								–	1	–	5
Total								7	39	84	279

SWD Eagles
Name	WEL	GRF	GFA	LEO	BDR	SF	F	App	Try	Kck	Pts
Dean Hopp	1	17 (substituted in)	17 (substituted in)	3	3	—	—	5	0	0	0
Mark Pretorius	2	2	2	2		—	—	4	3	0	15
Nemo Roelofse	3	3	3	17 (substituted in)	17 (substituted in)	—	—	5	0	0	0
Schalk Oelofse	4	4				—	—	2	0	0	0
Lodewyk Uys	5	5	5	5	5	—	—	5	0	0	0
Andisa Ntsila	6	6	19 (substituted in)	8	20 (substituted in)	—	—	5	2	0	10
Thor Halvorsen	7	7	7	6	7	—	—	5	1	0	5
Christo du Plessis	8	8	8	18 (substituted in)	8	—	—	5	3	0	15
Johan Steyn	9	9	9		9	—	—	4	2	0	10
Hansie Graaff	10	10	10	13	22 (substituted in)	—	—	5	0	38	38
Hentzwill Pedro	11	11	22 (substituted in)	11		—	—	4	1	0	5
Luzuko Vulindlu	12	12	14		12	—	—	4	1	0	5
Kirsten Heyns	13	13	13			—	—	3	0	0	0
Charles Radebe	14	14	11		11	—	—	4	1	0	5
Jacquin Jansen	15					—	—	1	0	0	0
Kurt Haupt	16 (substituted in)	16	16 (substituted in)	16 (substituted in)	2	—	—	4	3	0	15
Juandré Digue	17 (substituted in)					—	—	1	0	0	0
Grant le Roux	18 (substituted in)	18 (substituted in)	4		18 (substituted in)	—	—	4	0	0	0
Buran Parks	19 (substituted in)					—	—	1	0	0	0
Dillin Snel	20 (substituted in)	20 (substituted in)	20 (substituted in)	9		—	—	4	1	0	5
Wilneth Engelbrecht	21 (substituted in)	21 (substituted in)	12			—	—	3	0	0	0
Daniel Roberts	22 (substituted in)	15		21 (substituted in)	13	—	—	4	1	0	5
Layle Delo		1			16 (substituted in)	—	—	2	0	0	0
Janneman Stander		19 (substituted in)	6	19 (substituted in)	6	—	—	4	1	0	5
Tom Kean		22 (substituted in)	21	15	15	—	—	3	0	9	9
Teunis Nieuwoudt			1	1	1	—	—	3	0	0	0
Leighton Eksteen			15	10	14	—	—	3	0	6	6
Marco Kruger			18 (substituted in)			—	—	1	0	0	0
Lyndon Hartnick				4	19 (substituted in)	—	—	2	0	0	0
Davon Raubenheimer				7	4	—	—	2	0	0	0
Martin du Toit				12	10	—	—	2	2	0	10
Clinton Wagman				14		—	—	1	0	0	0
Mzo Dyantyi				20 (substituted in)	21 (substituted in)	—	—	2	0	0	0
Riaan Arends				22 (substituted in)		—	—	1	0	0	0
penalty try								–	1	–	5
Total								5	23	53	168

Welwitschias
Name	SWD	LEO	BDR	GRF	GFA	SF	F	App	Try	Kck	Pts
Casper Viviers	1	1				—	—	2	0	0	0
Gert Lotter	2	2	7	2	2	—	—	5	1	0	5
AJ de Klerk	3	3	3	3	3	—	—	5	0	0	0
Munio Kasiringua	4		19	18 (substituted in)	18 (substituted in)	—	—	3	0	0	0
Ruan Ludick	5	5	5	5	5	—	—	5	0	0	0
Zayne Groenewaldt	6	6	6	6	19 (substituted in)	—	—	5	0	0	0
Morné Blom	7	19 (substituted in)	8	7		—	—	4	1	0	5
Leneve Damens	8	8	16 (substituted in)	8	8	—	—	5	1	0	5
Cameron Klassen	9	9		20 (substituted in)		—	—	3	0	0	0
Eugene Jantjies	10	10	10	9	9	—	—	5	2	42	52
Gino Wilson	11	11		14		—	—	3	1	0	5
Darryl de la Harpe	12	12	12	12		—	—	4	0	0	0
Heinrich Smit	13	13	14		13	—	—	4	0	0	0
Philip Nashikaku	14	14	21 (substituted in)	11	11	—	—	5	1	0	5
Chrysander Botha	15	15	15	15	10	—	—	5	1	0	5
Shaun du Preez	16 (substituted in)		1		16 (substituted in)	—	—	3	0	0	0
Quintin Esterhuizen	17 (substituted in)	17 (substituted in)				—	—	2	0	0	0
Denzil van Wyk	18 (substituted in)	4	4	4	4	—	—	5	0	0	0
Johann Wohler	19 (substituted in)			19 (substituted in)	7	—	—	3	0	0	0
Nandivatu Karuuombe	20 (substituted in)					—	—	1	0	0	0
Lesley Klim	21 (substituted in)	21 (substituted in)	13	13		—	—	4	5	0	25
Mahco Prinsloo	22 (substituted in)	22 (substituted in)	20 (substituted in)			—	—	3	0	0	0
Rohan Kitshoff		7			6	—	—	2	0	0	0
Petri Burger		16 (substituted in)	2	16 (substituted in)		—	—	3	0	0	0
Alberto Engelbrecht		18 (substituted in)				—	—	1	0	0	0
JC Winckler		20 (substituted in)	9		20 (substituted in)	—	—	3	0	0	0
Russell van Wyk			11			—	—	1	0	0	0
Collen Smith			17 (substituted in)	17 (substituted in)		—	—	2	0	0	0
Thomas Kali			18 (substituted in)			—	—	1	0	0	0
Justin Nel			22 (substituted in)	10	22 (substituted in)	—	—	3	0	0	0
Hauta Veii				1	1	—	—	2	0	0	0
Shaun Kaizemi				21 (substituted in)	12	—	—	2	1	0	5
Malcolm Moore				22 (substituted in)	14	—	—	2	1	0	5
Riaan van Zyl					15	—	—	1	0	0	0
Nian Berg					17 (substituted in)	—	—	1	0	0	0
Francois Wiese					21 (substituted in)	—	—	1	0	0	0
Total								5	15	42	117

=== Points scorers ===
The following table contain points scored in the 2016 Currie Cup First Division:

Top Ten point scorers
No	Player	Team	T	C	P	DG	Pts
1	George Whitehead	Griffons	2	32	17	0	125
2	Johan Deysel	Leopards	5	29	6	0	101
3	Masixole Banda	Border Bulldogs	6	26	5	0	97
4	Eugene Jantjies	Welwitschias	2	12	6	0	52
5	Gene Willemse	Leopards	8	0	0	0	40
6	Hansie Graaff	SWD Eagles	0	13	4	0	38
7	Karlo Aspeling	Falcons	0	13	3	0	35
8	Johan Pretorius	Falcons	6	0	0	0	30
8	HP Swart	Leopards	6	0	0	0	30
10	Lesley Klim	Welwitschias	5	0	0	0	25
10	Sipho Nofemele	Border Bulldogs	5	0	0	0	25
10	Warren Williams	Griffons	5	0	0	0	25

Other point scorers
No	Player	Team	T	C	P	DG	Pts
13	Charlie Mayeza	Falcons	4	0	0	0	20
13	Bradley Moolman	Leopards	4	0	0	0	20
13	Etienne Taljaard	Falcons	4	0	0	0	20
16	Selvyn Davids	Griffons	3	0	0	0	15
16	Christo du Plessis	SWD Eagles	3	0	0	0	15
16	Onke Dubase	Border Bulldogs	3	0	0	0	15
16	Dean Gordon	Leopards	3	0	0	0	15
16	Kurt Haupt	SWD Eagles	3	0	0	0	15
16	De Wet Kruger	Griffons	3	0	0	0	15
16	Makazole Mapimpi	Border Bulldogs	3	0	0	0	15
16	Vuyo Mbotho	Griffons	3	0	0	0	15
16	Loftus Morrison	Leopards	3	0	0	0	15
16	Sonwabiso Mqalo	Border Bulldogs	3	0	0	0	15
16	Mark Pretorius	SWD Eagles	3	0	0	0	15
16	Adrian Vermeulen	Leopards	3	0	0	0	15
16	Oliver Zono	Border Bulldogs	3	0	0	0	15
29	Martin du Toit	SWD Eagles	2	0	0	0	10
29	Reinhardt Erwee	Griffons	2	0	0	0	10
29	Tertius Kruger	Griffons	2	0	0	0	10
29	Bart le Roux	Leopards	2	0	0	0	10
29	Michael Makase	Border Bulldogs	2	0	0	0	10
29	Reg Muller	Falcons	2	0	0	0	10
29	Japie Nel	Griffons	2	0	0	0	10
29	Andisa Ntsila	SWD Eagles	2	0	0	0	10
29	Friedle Olivier	Falcons	2	0	0	0	10
29	Anrich Richter	Falcons	2	0	0	0	10
29	Martin Sithole	Griffons	2	0	0	0	10
29	Johan Steyn	SWD Eagles	2	0	0	0	10
29	Danie van der Merwe	Griffons	2	0	0	0	10
29	Boela Venter	Griffons	2	0	0	0	10
29	Dennis Visser	Griffons	2	0	0	0	10
29	Marlyn Williams	Falcons	2	0	0	0	10
45	Tom Kean	SWD Eagles	0	0	3	0	9
45	Warren Potgieter	Falcons	0	3	1	0	9
47	Boela Abrahams	Griffons	1	0	0	1	8
48	Leighton Eksteen	SWD Eagles	0	3	0	0	6
48	Malherbe Swart	Leopards	0	3	0	0	6
50	Gavin Annandale	Griffons	1	0	0	0	5
50	Rowayne Beukman	Leopards	1	0	0	0	5
50	Morné Blom	Welwitschias	1	0	0	0	5
50	Chrysander Botha	Welwitschias	1	0	0	0	5
50	Coert Cronjé	Falcons	1	0	0	0	5
50	Xander Cronjé	Falcons	1	0	0	0	5
50	Leneve Damens	Welwitschias	1	0	0	0	5
50	Lunga Dumezweni	Border Bulldogs	1	0	0	0	5
50	Damian Engledoe	Falcons	1	0	0	0	5
50	Jan Enslin	Falcons	1	0	0	0	5
50	Ndzondelelo Gemashe	Border Bulldogs	1	0	0	0	5
50	Thor Halvorsen	SWD Eagles	1	0	0	0	5
50	Jaco Hayward	Leopards	1	0	0	0	5
50	Elandré Huggett	Griffons	1	0	0	0	5
50	Jaco Jordaan	Leopards	1	0	0	0	5
50	Shaun Kaizemi	Welwitschias	1	0	0	0	5
50	Athenkosi Khethani	Border Bulldogs	1	0	0	0	5
50	Josh Kota	Border Bulldogs	1	0	0	0	5
50	Gert Lotter	Welwitschias	1	0	0	0	5
50	Athenkosi Manentsa	Border Bulldogs	1	0	0	0	5
50	Malcolm Moore	Welwitschias	1	0	0	0	5
50	Philip Nashikaku	Welwitschias	1	0	0	0	5
50	Sino Nyoka	Border Bulldogs	1	0	0	0	5
50	Hentzwill Pedro	SWD Eagles	1	0	0	0	5
50	Charles Radebe	SWD Eagles	1	0	0	0	5
50	Daniel Roberts	SWD Eagles	1	0	0	0	5
50	Francois Robertse	Leopards	1	0	0	0	5
50	Andries Schutte	Falcons	1	0	0	0	5
50	Dillin Snel	SWD Eagles	1	0	0	0	5
50	Janneman Stander	SWD Eagles	1	0	0	0	5
50	Andries Truter	Falcons	1	0	0	0	5
50	Andrew van Wyk	Falcons	1	0	0	0	5
50	Luzuko Vulindlu	SWD Eagles	1	0	0	0	5
50	Lindokuhle Welemu	Border Bulldogs	1	0	0	0	5
50	Gino Wilson	Welwitschias	1	0	0	0	5
85	Johnny Welthagen	Leopards	0	1	0	0	2
—	penalty try	Griffons	2	0	0	0	10
—	penalty try	Leopards	1	0	0	0	5
—	penalty try	SWD Eagles	1	0	0	0	5
* Legend: T = Tries, C = Conversions, P = Penalties, DG = Drop Goals, Pts = Points.

=== Discipline ===
The following table contains all the cards handed out during the tournament:

Red cards or multiple yellow cards
Player	Team	Sent off (straight red)	Temporarily suspended
Soso Xakalashe	Border Bulldogs	1	0

Single yellow cards
Player	Team	Sent off (straight red)	Temporarily suspended
Nian Berg	Welwitschias	0	1
Lunga Dumezweni	Border Bulldogs	0	1
Gerhard Engelbrecht	Griffons	0	1
Thor Halvorsen	SWD Eagles	0	1
Elandré Huggett	Griffons	0	1
Jaco Jordaan	Leopards	0	1
Rohan Kitshoff	Welwitschias	0	1
Cameron Klassen	Welwitschias	0	1
Tertius Kruger	Griffons	0	1
Gert Lotter	Welwitschias	0	1
Vincent Maruping	Griffons	0	1
Loftus Morrison	Leopards	0	1
JP Mostert	Falcons	0	1
Reg Muller	Falcons	0	1
Charles Radebe	SWD Eagles	0	1
Dwight Pansegrouw	Falcons	0	1
Francois Robertse	Leopards	0	1
Nemo Roelofse	SWD Eagles	0	1
Jeandré Rudolph	Leopards	0	1
Dennis Visser	Griffons	0	1
Gene Willemse	Leopards	0	1
* Legend: (red card) = Sent off, (yellow card) = Sin-binned

== Referees ==
The following referees officiated matches in the 2016 Currie Cup First Division:

2016 Currie Cup First Division referees
Referees	Mike Adamson • Rodney Boneparte • Quinton Immelman • AJ Jacobs • Cwengile Jadezweni • Pro Legoete • Sindile Ngcese • Jaco Peyper • Alexandre Ruiz • Egon Seconds • Jaco van Heerden

== See also ==
- 2016 Currie Cup Premier Division
- 2016 Currie Cup qualification
- 2016 Under-21 Provincial Championship
- 2016 Under-20 Provincial Championship
- 2016 Under-19 Provincial Championship
