= 2017 Currie Cup First Division =

Domestic rugby union competition

- Countries: South Africa, Namibia
- Date: 25 August – 20 October 2017
- Champions: Griffons (4th title)
- Runners-up: Leopards
- Matches played: 31
- Tries scored: 315 (average 10.2 per match)
- Top point scorer: Jaun Kotzé (111)
- Top try scorer: Jeandré Rudolph (12)

The 2017 Currie Cup First Division was the second tier of the 2017 Currie Cup competition, an annual South African rugby union competition organised by the South African Rugby Union. It was the 79th edition of the competition and was contested between 25 August and 20 October 2017.

The competition was won by the Griffons, who beat the Leopards 60–36 in the final played on 20 October 2017.

== Competition rules and information ==
There were eight participating teams in the 2017 Currie Cup First Division. These eight teams played once against each other over the course of the competition, either at home or away. Teams received four points for a win and two points for a draw. Bonus points were awarded to teams that scored 4 or more tries in a game, as well as to teams that lost a match by 7 points or less. Teams were ranked by log points, then points difference (points scored less points conceded).

The top four teams qualified for the semi-finals, which was followed by a final.

== Teams ==
The teams that participated in the 2017 Currie Cup First Division were:

Location of teams in the 2017 Currie Cup First Division

=== Team Listing ===
2017 Currie Cup First Division teams
Team	Sponsored Name	Stadium/s	Sponsored Name
Boland Cavaliers	Boland Cavaliers	Boland Stadium, Wellington	Boland Stadium
Border Bulldogs	Border Bulldogs	Buffalo City Stadium, East London	Buffalo City Stadium
Eastern Province Kings	Eastern Province Kings	Nelson Mandela Bay Stadium, Port Elizabeth	Nelson Mandela Bay Stadium
Falcons	Hino Valke	Barnard Stadium, Kempton Park	Barnard Stadium
Griffons	Down Touch Griffons	North West Stadium, Welkom	HT Pelatona Projects Stadium
Leopards	Leopards	Olën Park, Potchefstroom	Profert Olën Park
SWD Eagles	SWD Eagles	Outeniqua Park, George	Outeniqua Park
Welwitschias	Windhoek Draught Welwitschias	Hage Geingob Stadium, Windhoek	Hage Geingob Stadium

== Standings ==
The final log for the 2017 Currie Cup First Division was:

2017 Currie Cup First Division log
Pos	Team	Pld	W	D	L	PF	PA	PD	TF	TA	TB	LB	Pts	Qualification
1	Griffons	7	6	0	1	329	227	+102	49	35	7	0	31	Semi-finals
2	Falcons	7	5	0	2	240	202	+38	33	30	5	1	26	Semi-finals
3	Leopards	7	4	1	2	301	221	+80	43	30	5	1	24	Semi-finals
4	Boland Cavaliers	7	4	0	3	238	196	+42	36	28	7	1	24	Semi-finals
5	SWD Eagles	7	4	1	2	240	230	+10	33	32	4	0	22	
6	Border Bulldogs	7	3	0	4	203	249	−46	28	36	5	2	19	
7	Welwitschias	7	1	0	6	267	313	−46	39	47	6	4	14	
8	Eastern Province Kings	7	0	0	7	174	354	−180	28	51	5	0	5	

Rules for classification: 4 points for a win; 2 points for a draw; 1 bonus point for a loss by seven points or less; 1 bonus point for scoring four or more tries in a match

=== Round-by-round ===
The table below shows each team's progression throughout the season. For each round, each team's cumulative points total is shown with the overall log position in brackets.

Team Progression – 2017 Currie Cup Premier Division
Team	R1	R2	R3	R4	R5	R6	R7	SF	F
Griffons	5 (2nd)	10 (1st)	15 (1st)	20 (1st)	25 (1st)	30 (1st)	31 (1st)	Won	Won
Falcons	5 (3rd)	5 (6th)	10 (4th)	11 (5th)	16 (4th)	21 (3rd)	26 (2nd)	Lost	—N/a
Leopards	3 (4th)	8 (2nd)	13 (2nd)	18 (2nd)	23 (2nd)	24 (2nd)	24 (3rd)	Won	Lost
Boland Cavaliers	5 (1st)	6 (5th)	11 (3rd)	12 (3rd)	14 (5th)	19 (4th)	24 (4th)	Lost	—N/a
SWD Eagles	3 (4th)	8 (3rd)	8 (6th)	12 (4th)	17 (3rd)	17 (5th)	22 (5th)	—N/a	—N/a
Border Bulldogs	2 (7th)	2 (7th)	2 (7th)	7 (7th)	9 (7th)	14 (6th)	19 (6th)	—N/a	—N/a
Welwitschias	2 (6th)	7 (4th)	8 (5th)	9 (6th)	11 (6th)	12 (7th)	14 (7th)	—N/a	—N/a
Eastern Province Kings	1 (8th)	2 (8th)	2 (8th)	3 (8th)	4 (8th)	4 (8th)	5 (8th)	—N/a	—N/a
Key:	win	draw	loss	bye					

== Matches ==
=== Regular season ===
==== Round one ====
25 August 2017	Leopards	42–42	SWD Eagles	Olën Park, Potchefstroom
16:00

26 August 2017	Eastern Province Kings	27–40	Boland Cavaliers	Wolfson Stadium, KwaZakele
15:00

26 August 2017	Griffons	66–59	Welwitschias	North West Stadium, Welkom
15:00

26 August 2017	Border Bulldogs	41–48	Falcons	Buffalo City Stadium, East London
15:30

==== Round two ====
1 September 2017	SWD Eagles	41–20	Border Bulldogs	Outeniqua Park, George
18:00

2 September 2017	Boland Cavaliers	26–47	Leopards	King Edward Stadium, Montagu
14:00

2 September 2017	Falcons	19–34	Griffons	Isak Steyl Stadium, Vanderbijlpark
15:00

2 September 2017	Welwitschias	51–25	Eastern Province Kings	Hage Geingob Stadium, Windhoek
16:00

==== Round three ====
8 September 2017	Leopards	57–20	Eastern Province Kings	Olën Park, Potchefstroom
16:00

9 September 2017	Griffons	57–22	SWD Eagles	North West Stadium, Welkom
15:30

9 September 2017	Welwitschias	47–56	Falcons	Hage Geingob Stadium, Windhoek
16:00

9 September 2017	Border Bulldogs	3–42	Boland Cavaliers	Buffalo City Stadium, East London
17:00

==== Round four ====
15 September 2017	Eastern Province Kings	24–40	Border Bulldogs	WJ de Wet Stadium, Despatch
15:00

15 September 2017	Leopards	78–29	Welwitschias	Olën Park, Potchefstroom
16:00

15 September 2017	SWD Eagles	13–9	Falcons	Outeniqua Park, George
18:00

16 September 2017	Boland Cavaliers	25–40	Griffons	Boland Stadium, Wellington
14:00

==== Round Five ====
23 September 2017	Falcons	35–31	Boland Cavaliers	Barnard Stadium, Kempton Park
15:00

23 September 2017	Griffons	71–39	Eastern Province Kings	North West Stadium, Welkom
15:00

23 September 2017	Border Bulldogs	32–36	Leopards	Buffalo City Stadium, East London
17:00

23 September 2017	Welwitschias	32–36	SWD Eagles	Hage Geingob Stadium, Windhoek
17:00

==== Round Six ====
29 September 2017	Leopards	22–28	Griffons	Hoërskool Klerksdorp, Klerksdorp
16:00

30 September 2017	Boland Cavaliers	48–20	SWD Eagles	Boland Stadium, Wellington
13:30

30 September 2017	Eastern Province Kings	17–29	Falcons	WJ de Wet Stadium, Despatch
15:00

30 September 2017	Border Bulldogs	26–25	Welwitschias	Buffalo City Stadium, East London
15:30

==== Round Seven ====
6 October 2017	SWD Eagles	66–22	Eastern Province Kings	Outeniqua Park, George
18:00

7 October 2017	Falcons	44–19	Leopards	Barnard Stadium, Kempton Park
15:00

7 October 2017	Griffons	33–41	Border Bulldogs	North West Stadium, Welkom
15:00

7 October 2017	Welwitschias	24–26	Boland Cavaliers	Hage Geingob Stadium, Windhoek
15:00

=== Title play-offs ===
==== Semi-finals ====
13 October 2017	Falcons	23–26	Leopards	Bosman Stadium, Brakpan
16:00		Report

14 October 2017	Griffons	32–21	Boland Cavaliers	North West Stadium, Welkom
15:30

==== Final ====
20 October 2017	Griffons	60–36	Leopards	North West Stadium, Welkom
16:00

== Honours ==
The honour roll for the 2017 Currie Cup First Division was as follows:

2017 Currie Cup First Division
Champions:	Griffons
Top points scorer:	Jaun Kotzé, Griffons (111)
Top try scorer:	Jeandré Rudolph, Leopards (12)

== Promotion/relegation play-off ==
27 October 2017	Griquas	v	Griffons	Griqua Park, Kimberley

== Players ==
=== Squads ===
Boland Cavaliers squad
Forwards	Yves Bashiya • Rinus Bothma • Gareth Cilliers • Kenan Cronjé • Francois Esterhuyzen • Zandré Jordaan • Kyle Kruger • Clemen Lewis • Arnout Malherbe • Chris Massyn • Clinton Theron • Linda Thwala • Chadley Wenn • Chaney Willemse • Ludio Williams • Marlyn Williams • Wayne Wilschut • Did not play: • Stefaan Grundlingh • Mac Muller • Ian Oosthuizen • Dylan Pieterse
Backs	Logan Basson • Adriaan Carelse • JP Coetzee • Jovelian de Koker • Danwel Demas • Alcino Izaacs • Charlie Mayeza • Freddie Muller • Divan Nel • Edwin Sass • Sergio Torrens • Vian van der Watt • Gerrit van Wyk • Elgar Watts • Valentino Wellman
Coach	Randall Modiba

Border Bulldogs squad
Forwards	Phumlani Blaauw • Ludwe Booi • Onke Dubase • Billy Dutton • Johannes Janse van Rensburg • Athenkosi Khethani • Blake Kyd • Lwando Mabenge • Athenkosi Manentsa • Mihlali Mpafi • Siyamthanda Ngande • Nkosi Nofuma • Ayabonga Nomboyo • Lukhanyo Nomzanga • Maliviwe Simanga • Hendri Storm • Soso Xakalashe • Yanga Xakalashe • Did not play: • Josh Kota • Thabiso Mngomezulu • Luzuko Nyabaza
Backs	Lunga Dumezweni • Lelethu Gcilitshana • Bangi Kobese • Sonwabiso Mqalo • Siya Ncanywa • Nkululeko Ndlovu • Saneliso Ngoma • Sipho Nofemele • Sino Nyoka • Mbembe Payi • Lundi Ralarala • Sethu Tom • Did not play: • Henrico Koester • Ntando Mfengu • Xolo Mlonyeni
Coach	David Dobela

Eastern Province Kings squad
Forwards	Zingisa April • Dewald Barnard • Cody Basson • Reyno du Toit • Renier Erasmus • Wynand Grassmann • Stephan Greeff • Jedwyn Harty • Justin Hollis • JP Jamieson • Josh Kota • Bart le Roux • Anele Lungisa • Dumisani Meslane • Matthew Moore • Freddy Ngoza • SF Nieuwoudt • Luzuko Nyabaza • Nicolas Roebeck • Masixole Screech • Victor Sekekete • Xandré Vos • Diego Williams • Thembelihle Yase • Did not play: • Tango Balekile • Brandon Brown • Bathandwa Cafu • Gerrit Huisamen • Lindokuhle Welemu
Backs	Riaan Arends • Alshaun Bock • Simon Bolze • Michael Brink • Luvo Claassen • Ntabeni Dukisa • Ivan-John du Preez • Riaan Esterhuizen • Rowan Gouws • Siyanda Grey • Thabang Holejane • Andile Jho • Harlon Klaasen • Rivan Lemmer • Sonwabo Majola • Michael Makase • Sphu Msutwana • Yamkela Ngam • Jarryd Sage • Curtis Sias • Ruan Stander • Keanu Vers • Lindelwe Zungu • Did not play: • Eben Barnard • Quewin Gawie
Coach	Ryan Felix

Falcons squad
Forwards	Jacques Alberts • Henri Boshoff • Jan Enslin • Marnus Erasmus • Shane Kirkwood • Marco Klopper • Ernst Ladendorf • Robey Leibrandt • Thabo Mabuza • Reg Muller • Friedle Olivier • Dwight Pansegrouw • Heinrich Roelfse • Andries Schutte • Martin Sithole • Koos Strauss • Gihard Visagie • Did not play: • Wiehan Hay • Dian Koen • Thabo Mamojele • JP Mostert • Dylan Peterson • Tiaan Weyers
Backs	Ruan Allerston • Coert Cronjé • Errol Jaggers • Grant Janke • Don Mlondobozi • Warren Potgieter • Johan Pretorius • Anrich Richter • Christian Rust • Etienne Taljaard • Andries Truter • Andrew van Wyk • Did not play: • Xander Cronjé • Maphutha Dolo • André du Plessis • Keaton Gordon • Cameron Rooi
Coach	Rudy Joubert

Griffons squad
Forwards	Gavin Annandale • Cody Basson • PW Botha • Neil Claassen • Andrew du Plessis • Samora Fihlani • Henco Greyling • Ruan Kramer • Erik le Roux • Vincent Maruping • Thato Mavundla • Khwezi Mkhafu • Barend Potgieter • Jean Pretorius • Boela Serfontein • Joe van der Hoogt • Danie van der Merwe • Did not play: • JP Alberts • Rudi Britz • Ruben Fourie • Cornel Jacobs • Werner Kotze • JP Mans • George Marich • Martin Sithole • Hennie Venter • Reinach Venter • Ntokozo Vidima • Jasper Wiese
Backs	Ezrick Alexander • Heinrich Bitzi • Shirwin Cupido • Rodney Damons • Selvyn Davids • Alrin Eksteen • Joubert Engelbrecht • Jaun Kotzé • Tertius Maarman • Vuyo Mbotho • Wynand Pienaar • Duan Pretorius • Malcolm-Kerr Till • Louis Venter • Arthur Williams • Warren Williams • Did not play: • Hein Bezuidenhoudt • Carel-Jan Coetzee • Sandile Kubekha • Japie Nel • Nazo Nkala • Robbie Petzer • Sherwin Slater • Leighton van Wyk
Coach	Oersond Gorgonzola

Leopards squad
Forwards	Tiaan Bezuidenhout • Dewald Dekker • Francois Jacobs • Juan Language • Muziwandile Mazibuko • Stairs Mhlongo • Loftus Morrison • Marno Redelinghuys • Edmund Rheeder • Jeandré Rudolph • Joe Smith • Marius Stander • Walt Steenkamp • Morné Strydom • HP Swart • Gideon van der Merwe • Dane van der Westhuyzen • Boela Venter • Ruan Venter • Did not play: • Robert Hunt • Schalk Jooste • Mogau Mabokela • Matimu Manganyi • Gopolang Molefe • Jaco Swanepoel • Louis van der Westhuizen • Cameron van Heerden • Nico van Tonder
Backs	Dean Gordon • Lungelo Gosa • Schalk Hugo • Wessel Kuhn • Tapiwa Mafura • Henko Marais • Bradley Moolman • Jimmy Mpailane • Justin Newman • Gerhard Nortier • Elden Schoeman • Chriswill September • Ryno Wepener • Gene Willemse • Did not play: • Rowayne Beukman • Duhann Gunter • Eugene Hare • Jaco Hayward • Hendrik Mulder • Akhona Nela • Dylan Schoeman • Willem Steenkamp
Coach	Jonathan Mokeuna

SWD Eagles squad
Forwards	Freginald Africa • Marné Coetzee • Juandré Digue • Johann Grundlingh • Kurt Haupt • Wiehan Hay • Thor Halvorsen • Cornell Hess • Luxolo Koza • Teunis Nieuwoudt • Dylan Peterson • Davon Raubenheimer • Anton Smit • Brendon Snyman • Vukile Sofisa • Janneman Stander • Lodewyk Uys • Jan van der Merwe • Jacques Vermaak • SP Wessels • Simon Westraadt • Did not play: • Andisa Ntsila • Basil Short • Peet van der Walt
Backs	Martin du Toit • Leighton Eksteen • Wilneth Engelbrecht • Tyler Fisher • TJ Goddard • Kirsten Heyns • Adri Jacobs • Quaid Langeveldt • Marquit September • Dillin Snel • Johan Steyn • Marlou van Niekerk • Marlo Weich • Johnny Welthagen • Did not play: • Justin Bhana • Shadward Fillies • Charles Radebe • Leegan Moos • Luzuko Vulindlu
Coach	Rynhardt van As

Welwitschias squad
Forwards	Adriaan Booysen • AJ de Klerk • Riaan de Klerk • Shaun du Preez • Thomasau Forbes • Herman Grobler • Joe Herrmann • Thomas Kali • Munio Kasiringua • Max Katjijeko • Bigman Kaura • Rohan Kitshoff • Ruan Ludick • James Marx • Christo McNish • Obert Nortjé • Andries Rousseau • Des Sethie • Nelius Theron • Mahepisa Tjeriko • Christo van der Merwe • Niël van Vuuren • Denzil van Wyk • Hauta Veii • Roderique Victor • Did not play: • Leneve Damens • André Rademeyer • Winmar Rust • Collen Smith
Backs	Darryl de la Harpe • Janré du Toit • JC Greyling • Eugene Jantjies • TC Kisting • Cameron Klassen • Lesley Klim • Theuns Kotzé • David Philander • Mahco Prinsloo • Heinrich Smit • PW Steenkamp • Johann Tromp • Russell van Wyk • Dirk von Weidts • Francois Wiese • Gino Wilson • Did not play: • Ethan Beukes • Nikin Cloete • Justin Nel • Collins Omalu • Aurelio Plato • MP Pretorius • JC Winckler
Coach	Lyn Jones
