= 2018 Currie Cup First Division =

Domestic rugby union competition

- Countries: South Africa
- Date: 24 August – 19 October 2018
- Champions: SWD Eagles (3rd title)
- Runners-up: Falcons
- Matches played: 24
- Tries scored: 223 (average 9.3 per match)
- Top point scorer: Anrich Richter (Falcons, 105)
- Top try scorer: Etienne Taljaard (Falcons, 13)

The 2018 Currie Cup First Division was the second tier of the 2018 Currie Cup, the 80th edition of the annual South African rugby union competition organised by the South African Rugby Union. It was played between 24 August and 19 October 2018 and featured seven of the eight teams that played in 2017, following Namibian side Welwitschias' withdrawal.

The competition was won by the SWD Eagles, who beat the Falcons 36–27 in the final played on 19 October 2018.

== Competition rules and information ==
There were seven participating teams in the 2018 Currie Cup First Division. They played each other once during the pool stage, either at home or away. Teams receive four points for a win and two points for a draw. Bonus points were awarded to teams that scored four or more tries in a game, as well as to teams that lost a match by seven points or less. Teams were ranked by log points, then points difference (points scored less points conceded).

The top four teams in the pool stage qualified for the semifinals, which were followed by a final.

=== Financial crisis and withdrawal of Welwitschias ===
The start of the 2018 Currie Cup First Division was marred by financial problems following the South African Rugby Union's announcement that First Division teams' budgets would be cut by 52%. The Griffons announced that they would reduce player contracts to 8-month contracts and the Leopards intimated that they might forfeit away matches to save on travel costs. and there were serious concerns about the participation of teams like the Border Bulldogs and Eastern Province Elephants. Namibian side Welwitschias were informed that they would have to pay the travel costs for teams travelling to games in Windhoek, but — after initial reports indicated that they raised the money with the help of World Rugby — they could not raise the required funds and announced their withdrawal from the competition.

== Teams ==
Location of teams in the 2018 Currie Cup First Division

The teams that played in the 2018 Currie Cup First Division are:

2018 Currie Cup First Division teams
Team	Sponsored Name	Stadium/s	Sponsored Name
Boland Cavaliers	Boland Cavaliers	Boland Stadium, Wellington	Boland Stadium
Border Bulldogs	Border Bulldogs	Buffalo City Stadium, East London	Buffalo City Stadium
Eastern Province Elephants	Eastern Province Elephants	Nelson Mandela Bay Stadium, Port Elizabeth	Nelson Mandela Bay Stadium
Falcons	Hino Valke	Barnard Stadium, Kempton Park	Barnard Stadium
Griffons	Down Touch Griffons	North West Stadium, Welkom	HT Pelatona Projects Stadium
Leopards	Leopards	Fanie du Toit Sport Ground, Potchefstroom	Fanie du Toit Stadium
SWD Eagles	SWD Eagles	Outeniqua Park, George	Outeniqua Park

== Pool stage ==
=== Standings ===
The final log for the 2018 Currie Cup First Division was:

2018 Currie Cup First Division log
Pos	Team	Pld	W	D	L	PF	PA	PD	TF	TA	TB	LB	Pts	Qualification
1	SWD Eagles (Q)	6	5	0	1	220	125	+95	31	17	5	1	26	Semifinals
2	Falcons	6	4	0	2	305	199	+106	45	29	5	1	22	Semifinals
3	Leopards	6	4	0	2	201	161	+40	28	22	5	1	22	Semifinals
4	Griffons	6	3	0	3	219	194	+25	34	27	5	2	19	Semifinals
5	Boland Cavaliers	6	3	0	3	195	177	+18	27	26	2	1	15	
6	Border Bulldogs	6	2	0	4	141	233	−92	22	36	3	0	11	
7	Eastern Province Elephants	6	0	0	6	117	309	−192	17	47	2	1	3	

Rules for classification: 4 points for a win; 2 points for a draw; 1 bonus point for a loss by seven points or less; 1 bonus point for scoring four or more tries in a match
(Q) Qualified for the promotion play-off

=== Round-by-round ===
The table below shows a team's progression throughout the season. For each round, each team's cumulative points total is shown with the overall log position in brackets.

Team Progression – 2018 Currie Cup First Division
Team	R1	R2	R3	R4	R5	R6	R7	SF	F
SWD Eagles	1 (4th)	6 (3rd)	11 (2nd)	16 (1st)	16 (2nd)	21 (1st)	26 (1st)	Won	Won
Falcons	5 (2nd)	10 (1st)	10 (3rd)	12 (3rd)	12 (4th)	17 (3rd)	22 (2nd)	Won	Lost
Leopards	4 (3rd)	9 (2nd)	14 (1st)	14 (2nd)	19 (1st)	20 (2nd)	22 (3rd)	Lost	—
Griffons	0 (6th)	2 (5th)	2 (6th)	4 (6th)	9 (6th)	14 (5th)	19 (4th)	Lost	—
Boland Cavaliers	5 (1st)	5 (4th)	6 (4th)	11 (4th)	15 (3rd)	15 (4th)	15 (5th)	—	—
Border Bulldogs	1 (5th)	1 (6th)	6 (5th)	11 (5th)	11 (5th)	11 (6th)	11 (6th)	—	—
Eastern Province Elephants	0 (7th)	0 (7th)	1 (7th)	2 (7th)	2 (7th)	3 (7th)	3 (7th)	—	—
Key:	win	draw	loss	bye					

=== Matches ===
The following matches were played in the 2018 Currie Cup First Division:

==== Round One ====
The 2018 Currie Cup First Division season kicked off with an away victory for the Leopards in George, beating home side SWD Eagles 27–25 in a close affair. The other two matches of the round was far more comprehensive; the Boland Cavaliers scored ten converted tries in their 70–12 victory over the Eastern Province Elephants in Robertson, with Zandré Jordaan, Tapiwa Tsomondo and Valentino Wellman scoring two each, and the Falcons also scored ten tries in their 66–27 victory over the Border Bulldogs in Kempton Park, where Friedle Olivier and Etienne Taljaard scored braces.

24 August 2018	SWD Eagles	25–27	Leopards	Outeniqua Park, George
18:00	Try: Vukile Sofisa; Wayne Wilschut penalty try Con: Leighton Eksteen; Pen: Leighton Eksteen; Divan Nel	Scoreboard	Try: Boela Venter; Gerhard Nortier; Tapiwa Mafura; Con: Schalk Hugo (2); Gerhard Nortier; Pen: Schalk Hugo; Gerhard Nortier	Referee: Aimee Barrett-Theron

25 August 2018	Boland Cavaliers	70–12	Eastern Province Elephants	Van Zyl Street Sports Grounds, Robertson
14:30	Try: Clinton Theron; Marlyn Williams; Tapiwa Tsomondo (2); Zandré Jordaan (2); Valentino Wellman (2); Gerrit van Wyk; Charlie Mayeza; Con: Jaywinn Juries (5); Elgar Watts; Jacquin Jansen (4)	Scoreboard	Try: Zingisa April; Diego Williams; Con: Henrique Olivier	Referee: Graham Cooper

25 August 2018	Falcons	66–27	Border Bulldogs	Barnard Stadium, Kempton Park
16:00	Try: Andries Schutte; Friedle Olivier (2); Shane Kirkwood; Thabo Mabuza; Ernst Ladendorf; Etienne Taljaard (2); Grant Janke; Lundi Ralarala; Con: Anrich Richter (5); Warren Potgieter (3)	Scoreboard	Try: Mihlali Mpafi; Carlisle Jordan; Sonwabiso Mqalo; Soso Xakalashe; Con: Bangi Kobese; Dilolo Mapuko; Pen: Bangi Kobese	Referee: Ben Crouse

Bye/s: Griffons

==== Round Two ====
The Falcons moved to the top of the log after a 56–52 victory over defending champions the Griffons. For the second match in succession, Friedle Olivier and Etienne Taljaard each scored two tries for the Falcons, while a hat-trick from prop Danie van der Merwe was not enough for the team from Welkom. The Leopards kept in touch with the Falcons, securing their second win of the competition after beating the Boland Cavaliers 35–12 in Potchefstroom, while the SWD Eagles outscored the Border Bulldogs 37–22 in East London, with three players – Ruben Schoeman and Marlo Weich for the SWD Eagles and Sonwabiso Mqalo for the Border Bulldogs – getting two tries in the match.

31 August 2018	Leopards	35–12	Boland Cavaliers	Fanie du Toit Sport Ground, Potchefstroom
17:00	Try: Marius Stander; Bradley Moolman; Jimmy Mpailane; Gerhard Nortier; Akhona Nela; Con: DP de Lange; Gerhard Nortier (4)	Scoreboard	Try: Clemen Lewis; Tapiwa Tsomondo; Con: Jacquin Jansen	Referee: Ruhan Meiring

31 August 2018	Border Bulldogs	22–37	SWD Eagles	Buffalo City Stadium, East London
18:00	Try: Somila Jho; Sonwabiso Mqalo (2); Con: Dilolo Mapuko; Aphiwe Stemele; Pen: Bangi Kobese	Scoreboard	Try: Alshaun Bock; Marlo Weich (2); Ruben Schoeman (2); Con: Divan Nel (3); Pen: Divan Nel (2)	Referee: Cwengile Jadezweni

1 September 2018	Griffons	52–56	Falcons	North West Stadium, Welkom
15:00	Try: Danie van der Merwe (3); Nkululeko Marwana; Rodney Damons; Neil Stannard; Shirwin Cupido; Cody Basson; Con: Duan Pretorius (6)	Scoreboard	Try: Friedle Olivier (2); Shane Kirkwood; Etienne Taljaard (2); Grant Janke; Don Mlondobozi penalty try Con: Anrich Richter (5); Errol Jaggers (2)	Referee: Egon Seconds

Bye/s: Eastern Province Elephants

==== Round Three ====
A bye for leaders the Falcons saw the Leopards take over top spot in the competition following their 28–21 bonus point victory over the Eastern Province Elephants in Port Elizabeth. Defending champions the Griffons suffered their second loss in a row, being beaten 7–32 by a SWD Eagles side for whom Marlo Weich scored two tries for the second match in a row, moving into second place on the log in the process. The weekend's other match saw the Border Bulldogs beat the Boland Cavaliers 24–17 in Bredasdorp in their first victory of the season.

7 September 2018	SWD Eagles	32–7	Griffons	Outeniqua Park, George
18:00	Try: Wayne Wilschut; Vuyo Mbotho; Marlo Weich (2); Con: Divan Nel (3); Pen: Divan Nel (2)	Scoreboard	Try: Tertius Maarman; Con: Heinrich Bitzi	Referee: Rasta Rasivhenge

8 September 2018	Boland Cavaliers	17–24	Border Bulldogs	Glaskasteel, Bredasdorp
14:30	Try: Clemen Lewis; Wilneth Engelbrecht; Valentino Wellman; Con: Quaid Langeveldt	Scoreboard	Try: Athenkosi Khethani; Athenkosi Manentsa; Foxy Ntleki; Sonwabiso Mqalo; Con: Dilolo Mapuko (2)	Referee: Quinton Immelman

8 September 2018	Eastern Province Elephants	21–28	Leopards	Wolfson Stadium, KwaZakele
15:30	Try: Diego Williams; Ntabeni Dukisa; Sphu Msutwana; Con: Ntabeni Dukisa (2); Henrique Olivier	Scoreboard	Try: Louis van der Westhuizen; Muziwandile Mazibuko; Dean Gordon; Tapiwa Mafura; Con: Schalk Hugo (4)	Referee: Paul Mente

Bye/s: Falcons

==== Round Four ====
A fourth different team moved to the top of the log in as many weeks as the SWD Eagles moved into top spot following a 36–34 victory over the Falcons in a match that saw the teams share 12 tries. The Boland Cavaliers kept up the pressure by also securing a narrow away win, beating the Griffons 48–45 in Welkom, with Charlie Mayeza scoring two tries and Elgar Watts contributing 15 points in the match for the visitors, while a hat-trick for Japie Nel and a brace for Cody Basson was in vain for the home side. The Border Bulldogs emerged victorious in the Eastern Cape derby, with doubles from Sonwabiso Mqalo and Sipho Nofemele helping their team to a 39–26 win over the Eastern Province Elephants.

14 September 2018	Border Bulldogs	39–26	Eastern Province Elephants	Buffalo City Stadium, East London
19:00	Try: Sino Nyoka; Sipho Nofemele (2); Sonwabiso Mqalo (2); Bangi Kobese; Lutho Adonis; Con: Dilolo Mapuko; Bangi Kobese	Scoreboard	Try: Zingisa April; Ivan-John du Preez; JP Jamieson; Riaan Arends; Con: Henrique Olivier; Ruben de Vos (2)	Referee: Archie Sehlako

15 September 2018	Griffons	45–48	Boland Cavaliers	North West Stadium, Welkom
15:00	Try: Thato Mavundla; Cody Basson (2); Japie Nel (3); Nkululeko Marwana; Con: Duan Pretorius (5)	Scoreboard	Try: Tapiwa Tsomondo; Zandré Jordaan; Elgar Watts; Charlie Mayeza (2); Kenan Cronjé; Valentino Wellman; Con: Elgar Watts (5); Pen: Damian Stevens	Referee: Ben Crouse

15 September 2018	Falcons	34–36	SWD Eagles	Barnard Stadium, Kempton Park
15:30	Try: Thabo Mabuza; Anrich Richter; Etienne Taljaard; Lundi Ralarala; Don Mlondobozi; Andries Truter; Con: Anrich Richter (2)	Scoreboard	Try: Ruben Schoeman; Marlo Weich; Leighton Eksteen; Dewald Dekker; Kirsten Heyns; Ganfried May; Con: Divan Nel (3)	Referee: Ricus van der Hoven

Bye/s: Leopards

==== Round Five ====
The Leopards returned to the top of the log after beating the Border Bulldogs 47–22, with fullback Gerhard Nortier scoring two tries for the team from Potchefstroom. The Boland Cavaliers moved into third place following a low-scoring 20–7 win over the Falcons in Lambert's Bay, while the Griffons won the match between the two winless teams, beating the Eastern Province Elephants 35–22 with wing Rodney Damons scoring a hat-trick for the winning team.

21 September 2018	Leopards	47–22	Border Bulldogs	Fanie du Toit Sport Ground, Potchefstroom
17:00	Try: Louis van der Westhuizen; Muziwandile Mazibuko; Dean Stokes; Marius Stander; Evardi Boshoff; Gerhard Nortier (2); Con: Schalk Hugo (6)	Scoreboard	Try: Nkosi Nofuma; Foxy Ntleki; Billy Dutton; Con: Dilolo Mapuko (2); Pen: Dilolo Mapuko	Referee: Aimee Barrett-Theron

22 September 2018	Eastern Province Elephants	22–35	Griffons	Nelson Mandela Bay Stadium, Port Elizabeth
15:00	Try: Xandré Vos; Zingisa April; Tristan Blewett; Con: Henrique Olivier (2); Pen: Henrique Olivier	Scoreboard	Try: Rodney Damons (3); Shaun McDonald; Arthur Williams; Con: Duan Pretorius (5)	Referee: Jaco Peyper

22 September 2018	Boland Cavaliers	20–7	Falcons	Lambert's Bay Sports Grounds, Lambert's Bay
16:00	Try: Marlyn Williams; Valentino Wellman; Con: Jacquin Jansen (2); Pen: Ralton October (2)	Scoreboard	Try: Coert Cronjé; Con: Anrich Richter	Referee: Marius van der Westhuizen

Bye/s: SWD Eagles

==== Round Six ====
The SWD Eagles moved back to the top of the log following a 54–28 victory over the Boland Cavaliers, securing a semifinal spot in the process. Seven different players scored tries for the home side, with fly-half Divan Nel contributing 19 points with the boot, while a brace from loose forward Tapiwa Tsomondo was in vain for the away side. Round Five log leaders the Leopards suffered their first defeat of the season, losing 29–40 to the Griffons in Welkom, but also secured a play-off spot. Three players scored two tries each in the match — Tertius Maarman and Barend Potgieter for the Griffons and Gerhard Nortier for the Leopards — as the Griffons maintained their play-off push by moving up to fifth spot. The biggest victory of the round came in Kempton Park, where the Falcons ran in 15 tries in a 101–29 victory over the Eastern Province Elephants to secure the third semifinal place. Winger Etienne Taljaard scored four tries for the Falcons, with Coert Cronjé, Thabo Mabuza and Friedle Olivier getting two each, while scrumhalf Anrich Richter converted 11 of his side's tries.

28 September 2018	Falcons	101–29	Eastern Province Elephants	Barnard Stadium, Kempton Park
14:00	Try: Marco Klopper; Thabo Mabuza (2); Friedle Olivier (2); Etienne Taljaard (4); Lundi Ralarala; Coert Cronjé (2); Andrew Volschenk; Martin Sithole; Andrew van Wyk; Con: Anrich Richter (11); Andries Truter (2)	Scoreboard	Try: Anele Lungisa; Ruan van Rensburg; Michael Makase; Ruben de Vos; Con: Ruben de Vos (3); Pen: Ruben de Vos	Referee: Cwengile Jadezweni

28 September 2018	SWD Eagles	54–28	Boland Cavaliers	Outeniqua Park, George
18:00	Try: Jacques Vermaak; Ruben Schoeman; Nicolaas Immelman; Marlo Weich; Leighton Eksteen; Janneman Stander; Kirsten Heyns; Con: Divan Nel (5); Pen: Divan Nel (3)	Scoreboard	Try: Tapiwa Tsomondo (2); Wayne Smith; Con: Elgar Watts; Jacquin Jansen; Pen: Damian Stevens; Elgar Watts (2)	Referee: AJ Jacobs

29 September 2018	Griffons	40–29	Leopards	North West Stadium, Welkom
15:00	Try: Tertius Maarman (2); Cody Basson; Barend Potgieter (2); Nkululeko Marwana; Con: Duan Pretorius (5)	Scoreboard	Try: Robert Hunt; HP Swart; Gerhard Nortier (2); Con: Schalk Hugo (3); Pen: Schalk Hugo	Referee: Rasta Rasivhenge

Bye/s: Border Bulldogs

==== Round Seven ====
In the first match of the weekend, the Falcons leap-frogged the Leopards into second place on the log after winning the match between the teams 41–35, securing a home semifinal against the same opposition. Anrich Richter contributed 18 points for the home team, while a hat-trick for visiting winger Dean Stokes proved futile. The SWD Eagles secured top spot after a 36–7 win over bottom-of-the-log Eastern Province Elephants, with winger Adri Jacobs scoring two tries, and being awarded to penalty tries in the match. The final place in the play-offs was clinched by the Griffons, who beat the Border Bulldogs 40–7 with hooker Anrich Alberts getting a hat-trick, and in the processed moved into fourth spot ahead of the Boland Cavaliers who was not in action in this round.

5 October 2018	Leopards	35–41	Falcons	Fanie du Toit Sport Ground, Potchefstroom
17:00	Try: Dean Stokes (3); Lungelo Gosa; Marius Stander; Con: Schalk Hugo (5)	Scoreboard	Try: Friedle Olivier; Anrich Richter; Etienne Taljaard; Grant Janke; Lundi Ralarala; Con: Anrich Richter (5); Pen: Anrich Richter; Drop: Errol Jaggers	Referee: Cwengile Jadezweni

5 October 2018	Border Bulldogs	7–40	Griffons	Buffalo City Stadium, East London
19:00	Try: Billy Dutton; Con: Aphiwe Stemele	Scoreboard	Try: Anrich Alberts (3); Duan Pretorius; Thato Mavundla; Jean Pretorius; Nkululeko Marwana; Con: Duan Pretorius; Pen: Duan Pretorius	Referee: Rasta Rasivhenge

6 October 2018	Eastern Province Elephants	7–36	SWD Eagles	WJ de Wet Stadium, Despatch
15:00	Try: Riaan Arends; Con: Ruben de Vos	Scoreboard	Try: Adri Jacobs (2); Ruben Schoeman; Kirsten Heyns penalty try (2); Con: Divan Nel	Referee: AJ Jacobs

Bye/s: Boland Cavaliers

== Play-offs ==
=== Title play-offs ===
==== Semifinals ====
Two home victories saw the SWD Eagles and Falcons progress to the final. The Falcons convincingly beat the Leopards in Kempton Park, with four tries from loose forward Martin Sithole and 17 points from scrum-half Anrich Richter helping them to a 59–19 victory. It was a lower-scoring affair in George, where the SWD Eagles won 22–6 against the Griffons, with 17 of the home side's points coming from the boot of fly-half Divan Nel.

12 October 2018	Falcons	59–19	Leopards	Barnard Stadium, Kempton Park
15:00	Try: Marco Klopper; Anrich Richter; Etienne Taljaard; Grant Janke; Martin Sithole (4); Johan Pretorius; Con: Anrich Richter (6); Andries Truter	Scoreboard	Try: Lungelo Gosa; Con: Schalk Hugo; Pen: Schalk Hugo (3); Drop: Schalk Hugo	Referee: AJ Jacobs

12 October 2018	SWD Eagles	22–6	Griffons	Outeniqua Park, George
18:00	Try: Tyler Fisher; Con: Divan Nel; Pen: Divan Nel (5)	Scoreboard	Pen: Duan Pretorius (2)	Referee: Cwengile Jadezweni

==== Final ====
The SWD Eagles won their third Currie Cup First Division title — following on from wins in 2002 and 2007 — by beating the Falcons 36–27 in George, despite being 15–27 down as half-time. Eighth man Wayne Wilschut scored a hat-trick of tries for the home team, with Wynand Grassmann and Marlo Weich getting one each, and Divan Nel kicking 11 points. For the Falcons, Etienne Taljaard scored two more tries to finish as the competition's top try-scorer with 13 tries, while Anrich Richter scored a try and 12 points with the boot to finish as the top points scorer with 105.

19 October 2018	SWD Eagles	36–27	Falcons	Outeniqua Park, George
18:00	Try: Wynand Grassmann; Wayne Wilschut (3); Marlo Weich; Con: Divan Nel (4); Pen: Divan Nel	Scoreboard	Try: Anrich Richter; Etienne Taljaard (2); Con: Anrich Richter (3); Pen: Anrich Richter (2)	Referee: Cwengile Jadezweni

=== Promotion play-off ===
30 October 2018	Free State Cheetahs	36–5	SWD Eagles	Free State Stadium, Bloemfontein
18:00	Try: Penalty try 12'; Rabz Maxwane 18' c Tian Schoeman 20' m Louis Fouché 54' c William Small-Smith 63' m, 78' m Con: Louis Fouché 20', 55'	Scoreboard	Try: Vuyo Mbotho 60' m Cards: Vukile Sofisa (yellow card) 11' to 22'	Referee: Jaco Peyper

- Free State Cheetahs remained in the Currie Cup Premier Division for 2019.
- SWD Eagles remained in the Currie Cup First Division for 2019.

== Honours ==
The honour roll for the 2018 Currie Cup First Division was as follows:

2018 Currie Cup First Division
Champions:	SWD Eagles (3rd title)
Top points scorer:	Anrich Richter, Falcons (105)
Top try scorer:	Etienne Taljaard, Falcons (13)

== Players ==
The squads and player appearance and scoring statistics for the 2018 Currie Cup First Division are as follows:

Boland Cavaliers
Name	EPE	LEO	BDR	GRF	GFA	SWD	SF	F	App	Try	Con	Pen	DG	Pts
Arnout Malherbe	1	1	1	1	16 (substituted in)	1	—	—	6	0	0	0	0	0
Clemen Lewis	2	2	2	2		2	—	—	5	2	0	0	0	10
Clinton Theron	3	3	3		3	3	—	—	5	1	0	0	0	5
Marlyn Williams	4	4		4	4		—	—	4	2	0	0	0	10
Rinus Bothma	5	5	5	5		5	—	—	5	0	0	0	0	0
Tapiwa Tsomondo	6	6	6	6	6	6	—	—	6	6	0	0	0	30
Ludio Williams	7	7	7		7	7	—	—	5	0	0	0	0	0
Zandré Jordaan	8	8		8	8	8	—	—	5	3	0	0	0	15
Jaywinn Juries	9		21 (substituted in)	20			—	—	2	0	5	0	0	10
Elgar Watts	10			10	10	10	—	—	4	1	7	2	0	25
Sergio Torrens	11	15					—	—	2	0	0	0	0	0
Valentino Wellman	12	12	15	11	11	11	—	—	6	5	0	0	0	25
Gerrit van Wyk	13	13			13	13	—	—	4	1	0	0	0	5
Charlie Mayeza	14	14	14	14	14	14	—	—	6	3	0	0	0	15
Jacquin Jansen	15	10			12	21 (substituted in)	—	—	4	0	8	0	0	16
Francois Esterhuyzen	16 (substituted in)	16 (substituted in)	16	16 (substituted in)	2	16 (substituted in)	—	—	5	0	0	0	0	0
Stefaan Grundlingh	17 (substituted in)	18 (substituted in)	17 (substituted in)	3	17 (substituted in)	18 (substituted in)	—	—	6	0	0	0	0	0
Kenan Cronjé	18 (substituted in)	19 (substituted in)	8	7	5	4	—	—	6	1	0	0	0	5
Freddy Ngoza	19 (substituted in)						—	—	1	0	0	0	0	0
Damian Stevens	20 (substituted in)	9	9	9	9	9	—	—	6	0	0	2	0	6
Tyrone Abelse	21 (substituted in)		12		21 (substituted in)		—	—	3	0	0	0	0	0
Juandre Joseph	22 (substituted in)		20 (substituted in)	15			—	—	3	0	0	0	0	0
Bernado Botha		11	11	22 (substituted in)	22 (substituted in)		—	—	4	0	0	0	0	0
Raeez Salie		17 (substituted in)	18 (substituted in)	17 (substituted in)	1	17 (substituted in)	—	—	5	0	0	0	0	0
Ralton October		20 (substituted in)	22 (substituted in)		20 (substituted in)	20 (substituted in)	—	—	4	0	0	2	0	6
Wayne Smith		21 (substituted in)		12		22 (substituted in)	—	—	3	1	0	0	0	5
Quaid Langeveldt		22 (substituted in)	10	21 (substituted in)	15	15	—	—	5	0	1	0	0	2
Brandon Valentyn			4	18 (substituted in)	18 (substituted in)		—	—	3	0	0	0	0	0
Wilneth Engelbrecht			13	13		12	—	—	3	1	0	0	0	5
Taine Booysen			19 (substituted in)	19 (substituted in)	19 (substituted in)	19 (substituted in)	—	—	4	0	0	0	0	0
Total									6	27	21	6	0	195
Mac Muller and Andries Viljoen were named in the squad, but not included in a matchday squad.

Border Bulldogs
Name	GFA	SWD	BOL	EPE	LEO	GRF	SF	F	App	Try	Con	Pen	DG	Pts
Siyamthanda Ngande	1	1	1	1	1	1	—	—	6	0	0	0	0	0
Mihlali Mpafi	2	2	2	2	2	2	—	—	6	1	0	0	0	5
Lwando Mabenge	3	3	3	3	3	3	—	—	6	0	0	0	0	0
Athenkosi Khethani	4	5	5	5	5		—	—	5	1	0	0	0	5
Johannes Janse van Rensburg	5						—	—	1	0	0	0	0	0
Lukhanyo Nomzanga	6	6	7	6		19 (substituted in)	—	—	5	0	0	0	0	0
Onke Dubase	7	7	6	7	7	6	—	—	6	0	0	0	0	0
Athenkosi Manentsa	8	8	8	8	8	8	—	—	6	1	0	0	0	5
Bangi Kobese	9	9	20 (substituted in)	20 (substituted in)		20 (substituted in)	—	—	5	1	2	2	0	15
Aphiwe Stemele	10	21 (substituted in)	21 (substituted in)	21 (substituted in)	21 (substituted in)	10	—	—	6	0	2	0	0	4
Carlisle Jordan	11	11					—	—	2	1	0	0	0	5
Somila Mantyoyi	12	12	12	12	12	12	—	—	6	0	0	0	0	0
Foxy Ntleki	13	22 (substituted in)	13	13	13	13	—	—	6	2	0	0	0	10
Sipho Nofemele	14	14	14	14	14	14	—	—	6	2	0	0	0	10
Sonwabiso Mqalo	15	15	15	15	15	15	—	—	6	6	0	0	0	30
Lubabalo Lento	16 (substituted in)	16 (substituted in)	16 (substituted in)	16 (substituted in)	16 (substituted in)	16 (substituted in)	—	—	6	0	0	0	0	0
Thabo Ngcem	17 (substituted in)	17 (substituted in)		17 (substituted in)	17 (substituted in)	17 (substituted in)	—	—	5	0	0	0	0	0
Ayabonga Nomboyo	18 (substituted in)	4	4	4	4	5	—	—	6	0	0	0	0	0
Soso Xakalashe	19 (substituted in)	19 (substituted in)	19 (substituted in)	19 (substituted in)	19 (substituted in)		—	—	5	1	0	0	0	5
Sino Nyoka	20 (substituted in)	20 (substituted in)	9	9	9	9	—	—	6	1	0	0	0	5
Dilolo Mapuko	21 (substituted in)	10	10	10	10	21 (substituted in)	—	—	6	0	7	1	0	17
Somila Jho	22 (substituted in)	13	11	11	11	11	—	—	6	1	0	0	0	5
Nkosi Nofuma		18 (substituted in)	18 (substituted in)	18 (substituted in)	18 (substituted in)	4	—	—	5	1	0	0	0	5
Rob Lyons			17 (substituted in)				—	—	1	0	0	0	0	0
Lutho Adonis			22 (substituted in)	22 (substituted in)			—	—	2	1	0	0	0	5
Billy Dutton					6	7	—	—	2	2	0	0	0	10
Anele Zweni					20 (substituted in)		—	—	1	0	0	0	0	0
Sethu Tom					22 (substituted in)	22 (substituted in)	—	—	2	0	0	0	0	0
Mihlali Mosi						18 (substituted in)	—	—	1	0	0	0	0	0
Total									6	22	11	3	0	141
Lux Abraham, Lunga Dumezweni, Lelethu Gcilitshana, Blake Kyd, Siya Ncanywa, Mihlali Nchukana, Thokozani Ngodwana, Litha Nkula, Sibongile Novuka, Mbembe Payi, Sesethu Time and Yanga Xakalashe were named in the squad, but not included in a matchday squad.

Eastern Province Elephants
Name	BOL	LEO	BDR	GRF	GFA	SWD	SF	F	App	Try	Con	Pen	DG	Pts
Dewald Barnard	1	1	1				—	—	3	0	0	0	0	0
Josh Kota	2	2	2	16 (substituted in)	2	16	—	—	5	0	0	0	0	0
Johan van Wyk	3	3	3	18 (substituted in)	3	3	—	—	6	0	0	0	0	0
Hannes Huisamen	4						—	—	1	0	0	0	0	0
Gerrit Huisamen	5		4				—	—	2	0	0	0	0	0
Siphesihle Punguzwa	6	19	19 (substituted in)				—	—	2	0	0	0	0	0
Anele Lungisa	7	18 (substituted in)	5	5	5	5	—	—	6	1	0	0	0	5
Zingisa April	8	8	8	8	8	8	—	—	6	3	0	0	0	15
JP Smith	9	9					—	—	2	0	0	0	0	0
Ruben de Vos	10		21 (substituted in)	21 (substituted in)	15	21 (substituted in)	—	—	5	1	6	1	0	20
Sphu Msutwana	11	11	11	22 (substituted in)	11		—	—	5	1	0	0	0	5
Sherwin Slater	12	12				13	—	—	3	0	0	0	0	0
Ivan-John du Preez	13	13	13		13		—	—	4	1	0	0	0	5
Riaan Arends	14	14	22 (substituted in)		22 (substituted in)	15	—	—	5	2	0	0	0	10
Keanu Vers	15	15	15	15			—	—	4	0	0	0	0	0
Justin Antonie	16 (substituted in)	16 (substituted in)					—	—	2	0	0	0	0	0
Lyle Lombard	17 (substituted in)					17 (substituted in)	—	—	2	0	0	0	0	0
Nick Roebeck	18 (substituted in)	17 (substituted in)	17 (substituted in)	17 (substituted in)	17 (substituted in)	1	—	—	6	0	0	0	0	0
Mncedisi Dlwengu	19 (substituted in)		18 (substituted in)		18 (substituted in)	4	—	—	4	0	0	0	0	0
Diego Williams	20 (substituted in)	6	6	6	19 (substituted in)	6	—	—	6	2	0	0	0	10
Sonwabo Majola	21 (substituted in)	20 (substituted in)	9	20 (substituted in)	20 (substituted in)	9	—	—	6	0	0	0	0	0
Henrique Olivier	22 (substituted in)	21 (substituted in)	10	10	10	10	—	—	6	0	5	1	0	13
Stephan Greeff		4					—	—	1	0	0	0	0	0
Giant Mtyanda		5		4	4		—	—	3	0	0	0	0	0
Jurie van Vuuren		7		7			—	—	2	0	0	0	0	0
Ntabeni Dukisa		10					—	—	1	1	2	0	0	9
Dwayne Prince		22 (substituted in)					—	—	1	0	0	0	0	0
Quinton Haasbroek			7		7	7	—	—	3	0	0	0	0	0
Merlynn Pieterse			12	12	12	12	—	—	4	0	0	0	0	0
Monwabisi Mkhwakhwi			14			14	—	—	2	0	0	0	0	0
JP Jamieson			16 (substituted in)		16 (substituted in)	2	—	—	3	1	0	0	0	5
Sibusiso Ngcokovane			20 (substituted in)				—	—	1	0	0	0	0	0
Xandré Vos				1	1		—	—	2	1	0	0	0	5
Tango Balekile				2			—	—	1	0	0	0	0	0
Lupumlo Mguca				3			—	—	1	0	0	0	0	0
Ruan van Rensburg				9	9		—	—	2	1	0	0	0	5
Tristan Blewett				11			—	—	1	1	0	0	0	5
Ulrich Beyers				13			—	—	1	0	0	0	0	0
Michael Makase				14	14		—	—	2	1	0	0	0	5
Wayven Smith				19 (substituted in)	6	19 (substituted in)	—	—	3	0	0	0	0	0
Simon Bolze					21 (substituted in)		—	—	1	0	0	0	0	0
Siyabonga Moabi						11	—	—	1	0	0	0	0	0
Robert Isaacs						18 (substituted in)	—	—	1	0	0	0	0	0
Louis Strydom						20 (substituted in)	—	—	1	0	0	0	0	0
Cheswin van Wyk						22 (substituted in)	—	—	1	0	0	0	0	0
Total									6	17	13	2	0	117
Lusanda Badiyana, Michael Botha, Brandon Brown, Siyanda Grey, Andile Jho, Rouche Nel, Luzuko Nyabaza, Josiah Twum-Boafo and Alandré van Rooyen were named in the squad, but not included in a matchday squad.

Falcons
Name	BDR	GRF	SWD	BOL	EPE	LEO	LEO	SWD	App	Try	Con	Pen	DG	Pts
Koos Strauss	1	1	1	1		1	1	1	7	0	0	0	0	0
Jan Enslin	2	2		16 (substituted in)	16 (substituted in)	16 (substituted in)	16 (substituted in)	16 (substituted in)	7	0	0	0	0	0
Andries Schutte	3	3	3		17 (substituted in)	17 (substituted in)	17 (substituted in)	17 (substituted in)	7	1	0	0	0	5
Friedle Olivier	4	4	8	8	8	8	8	8	8	7	0	0	0	35
Shane Kirkwood	5	5	4	4	4	4	4	4	8	2	0	0	0	10
Thabo Mabuza	6	6	6	6	6	6	6	6	8	4	0	0	0	20
Ernst Ladendorf	7	7	7	7					4	1	0	0	0	5
Wihan Jacobs	8	8		18 (substituted in)	7	7	7	7	7	0	0	0	0	0
Anrich Richter	9	9	9	20 (substituted in)	9	9	9	9	8	4	41	3	0	105
Errol Jaggers	10	10	10	10	10	10	10	10	8	0	2	0	1	7
Etienne Taljaard	11	11	11		11	11	11	11	7	13	0	0	0	65
Grant Janke	12	12		22 (substituted in)	12	12	12	12	7	4	0	0	0	20
Lundi Ralarala	13	13	13	13	13	13	13	13	8	4	0	0	0	20
Don Mlondobozi	14	14	14	14		14	14	14	7	2	0	0	0	10
Andries Truter	15	15	15	15	15	15	15	15	8	1	3	0	0	11
Marco Klopper	16 (substituted in)	16 (substituted in)	2	2	2	2	2	2	8	2	0	0	0	10
Heinrich Roelfse	17 (substituted in)	17 (substituted in)	17 (substituted in)	3	3	3	3	3	8	0	0	0	0	0
Andrew Volschenk	18 (substituted in)	18 (substituted in)			18 (substituted in)	18 (substituted in)		18 (substituted in)	5	1	0	0	0	5
Martin Sithole	19 (substituted in)	19 (substituted in)	19 (substituted in)	19 (substituted in)	19 (substituted in)	19 (substituted in)	19 (substituted in)	19 (substituted in)	8	5	0	0	0	25
Johan Pretorius	20 (substituted in)	20 (substituted in)	20 (substituted in)	9	20 (substituted in)	20	20 (substituted in)	20 (substituted in)	7	1	0	0	0	5
Warren Potgieter	21 (substituted in)	21							1	0	3	0	0	6
Coert Cronjé	22 (substituted in)	22 (substituted in)	22 (substituted in)	11	14	22 (substituted in)	22 (substituted in)	22	7	3	0	0	0	15
Jacques Alberts			5	5	5	5	5	5	6	0	0	0	0	0
Leighton van Wyk			12	12					2	0	0	0	0	0
Robey Leibrandt			16 (substituted in)				18 (substituted in)		2	0	0	0	0	0
Njabulo Gumede			18 (substituted in)		1				2	0	0	0	0	0
Andrew van Wyk			21	21	21 (substituted in)	21	21 (substituted in)	21	2	1	0	0	0	5
Gihard Visagie				17 (substituted in)					1	0	0	0	0	0
Hardus Pretorius					22 (substituted in)				1	0	0	0	0	0
penalty try									–	1	–	–	–	7
Total									8	57	46	3	1	391
Henri Boshoff, André du Plessis, Lorenzo Gordon, Ethan Jantjies, Malope Masemola, Sive Mazosiwe, Vian Riekert, Martin Steyn, Eckhard van der Westhuizen and Nazeem Wood were named in the squad, but not included in a matchday squad.

Griffons
Name	GFA	SWD	BOL	EPE	LEO	BDR	SWD	F	App	Try	Con	Pen	DG	Pts
Danie van der Merwe	1	1	3	3	3	3	3	—	7	3	0	0	0	15
Anrich Alberts	2	2	2	2	2	2	2	—	7	3	0	0	0	15
Mhleli Dlamini	3	3						—	2	0	0	0	0	0
Gavin Annandale	4	4	4	4		5	4	—	6	0	0	0	0	0
Neil Claassen	5	5	5	5	5		6	—	6	0	0	0	0	0
Jean Pretorius	6	7	19 (substituted in)	20 (substituted in)	6	6	19 (substituted in)	—	7	1	0	0	0	5
Vincent Maruping	7		7	7	7	7	7	—	6	0	0	0	0	0
Cody Basson	8	8	8	8	8	8	8	—	7	4	0	0	0	20
Shirwin Cupido	9	9	9					—	3	1	0	0	0	5
Neil Stannard	10	10	10	10	10	21 (substituted in)	10	—	7	1	0	0	0	5
Rodney Damons	11	11		11	14	14	14	—	6	4	0	0	0	20
Duan Pretorius	12	12	15	13	13	10	13	—	7	1	22	3	0	58
Nkululeko Marwana	13	13	14	14	21 (substituted in)	13	22 (substituted in)	—	7	4	0	0	0	20
Warren Williams	14	14						—	2	0	0	0	0	0
Tertius Maarman	15	15	11	15	11	11	11	—	7	3	0	0	0	15
Maliviwe Simanga	16 (substituted in)	16 (substituted in)						—	2	0	0	0	0	0
PW Botha	17 (substituted in)							—	1	0	0	0	0	0
Rikus Zwart	18 (substituted in)	18 (substituted in)	18 (substituted in)					—	3	0	0	0	0	0
Colin Herbert	19 (substituted in)							—	1	0	0	0	0	0
Malcolm-Kerr Till	20 (substituted in)							—	1	0	0	0	0	0
Heinrich Bitzi	21 (substituted in)	21 (substituted in)					21 (substituted in)	—	3	0	1	0	0	2
Wynand Pienaar	22	22 (substituted in)		21 (substituted in)	15	15	15	—	5	0	0	0	0	0
Henco Greyling		6						—	1	0	0	0	0	0
Barend Potgieter		17 (substituted in)	1	1	1	1	1	—	6	2	0	0	0	10
Thato Mavundla		19 (substituted in)	6	6	19 (substituted in)	19 (substituted in)	20 (substituted in)	—	6	2	0	0	0	10
Boela Abrahams		20 (substituted in)	20 (substituted in)	9	9	9	9	—	6	0	0	0	0	0
Japie Nel			12	12	22 (substituted in)			—	3	3	0	0	0	15
Arthur Williams			13	22 (substituted in)	12	12	12	—	5	1	0	0	0	5
JP Mans			16	16	16 (substituted in)	16 (substituted in)	16 (substituted in)	—	3	0	0	0	0	0
Janu Botha			17 (substituted in)					—	1	0	0	0	0	0
Dwayne Wessels			21 (substituted in)		20 (substituted in)	20 (substituted in)		—	3	0	0	0	0	0
Ezrick Alexander			22 (substituted in)			22 (substituted in)		—	2	0	0	0	0	0
Doctor Booysen				17	17 (substituted in)	17 (substituted in)	17 (substituted in)	—	3	0	0	0	0	0
Jeremy Jordaan				18 (substituted in)	18 (substituted in)			—	2	0	0	0	0	0
Shaun McDonald				19 (substituted in)	4	4	18 (substituted in)	—	4	1	0	0	0	5
Dennis Visser						18 (substituted in)	5	—	2	0	0	0	0	0
Total									7	34	23	3	0	225
JP Alberts, Rudi Britz, Selvyn Davids and Ntokozo Vidima were named in the squad, but not included in a matchday squad.

Leopards
Name	SWD	BOL	EPE	BDR	GRF	GFA	GFA	F	App	Try	Con	Pen	DG	Pts
Matimu Manganyi	1	1	3	1	1	1	1	—	7	0	0	0	0	0
Marius Stander	2	2	16	16 (substituted in)	16 (substituted in)	16 (substituted in)	16 (substituted in)	—	6	3	0	0	0	15
Robert Hunt	3	3	17 (substituted in)	3	3	3	3	—	7	1	0	0	0	5
Johan Retief	4	4	4	4	4	4	4	—	7	0	0	0	0	0
Jaco Swanepoel	5	5						—	2	0	0	0	0	0
Siya Mdaka	6	6						—	2	0	0	0	0	0
Boela Venter	7	7	7	7	7	7	7	—	7	1	0	0	0	5
Edward Haas	8	8	8	8	6	8	8	—	7	0	0	0	0	0
Chriswill September	9	9		9	9	9	9	—	6	0	0	0	0	0
Schalk Hugo	10		10	10	10	10	10	—	6	0	21	5	1	60
Dean Stokes	11	11	11	11	11	11		—	6	4	0	0	0	20
Gerhard Nortier	12	10	21 (substituted in)	15	12	12	12	—	7	6	5	1	0	43
Bradley Moolman	13	13	22 (substituted in)		13	13		—	5	1	0	0	0	5
Jimmy Mpailane	14	14					11	—	3	1	0	0	0	5
Tapiwa Mafura	15	15	15		15	15	15	—	6	2	0	0	0	10
Louis van der Westhuizen	16 (substituted in)	16 (substituted in)	2	2	2	2	2	—	7	2	0	0	0	10
Nelius Theron	17 (substituted in)	17 (substituted in)	1		17 (substituted in)	17 (substituted in)	18 (substituted in)	—	6	0	0	0	0	0
Danny du Plooy	18	18 (substituted in)	5	5		5	5	—	5	0	0	0	0	0
Muziwandile Mazibuko	19 (substituted in)	19 (substituted in)	6	6		6	21 (substituted in)	—	6	2	0	0	0	10
Eugene Hare	20	20 (substituted in)	9				20 (substituted in)	—	3	0	0	0	0	0
Akhona Nela	21 (substituted in)	12	12	12	21 (substituted in)	21 (substituted in)	22 (substituted in)	—	7	1	0	0	0	5
Evardi Boshoff	22 (substituted in)	22 (substituted in)	13	13	22 (substituted in)	22 (substituted in)	13	—	7	1	0	0	0	5
DP de Lange		21 (substituted in)						—	1	0	1	0	0	2
Dean Gordon			14	14				—	2	1	0	0	0	5
Stairs Mhlongo			18 (substituted in)	18 (substituted in)	5	18 (substituted in)	19 (substituted in)	—	5	0	0	0	0	0
HP Swart			19 (substituted in)	19 (substituted in)	8	19 (substituted in)	6	—	5	1	0	0	0	5
Nkosana Mathaba			20 (substituted in)					—	1	0	0	0	0	0
Brendan Strydom				17 (substituted in)			17 (substituted in)	—	2	0	0	0	0	0
Sylvester Hassien				20 (substituted in)	20 (substituted in)	20 (substituted in)		—	3	0	0	0	0	0
Lungelo Gosa				21 (substituted in)	14	14	14	—	4	2	0	0	0	10
Divan Fick				22 (substituted in)				—	1	0	0	0	0	0
Etienne Oosthuizen					18 (substituted in)			—	1	0	0	0	0	0
Ruan Viljoen					19 (substituted in)			—	1	0	0	0	0	0
Total									7	29	27	6	1	220
Tiaan Bezuidenhout, Frans Botha, Theodore Ferreira, Ruan Grundlingh, Juan Language, Henko Marais, Percy Mngadi, Justin Newman, Merlynn Pieterse, Joe Smith, Walt Steenkamp, Morné Strydom, Gideon van der Merwe, Dane van der Westhuyzen, Estehan Visagie and Gene Willemse were named in the squad, but not included in a matchday squad.

SWD Eagles
Name	LEO	BDR	GRF	GFA	BOL	EPE	GRF	GFA	App	Try	Con	Pen	DG	Pts
Luxolo Koza	1	1	1	1	1	1	1	1	8	0	0	0	0	0
Jacques Vermaak	2	2	2	2	2	2	2	2	8	1	0	0	0	5
Vukile Sofisa	3	3	3	3	3		3	3	7	1	0	0	0	5
Anton Smit	4	4	4						3	0	0	0	0	0
Cornell Hess	5	5							2	0	0	0	0	0
Nicolaas Immelman	6		7	7	6	7	7	7	7	1	0	0	0	5
Brenden Esterhuizen	7	19 (substituted in)			19 (substituted in)	8	20 (substituted in)	20 (substituted in)	6	0	0	0	0	0
Wayne Wilschut	8	8	8	8	8	19 (substituted in)	8	8	8	5	0	0	0	25
Johan Steyn	9	9	9	9	9	20 (substituted in)	9	9	8	1	0	0	0	5
Leighton Eksteen	10	15	15	15	15	15	15	15	8	3	1	1	0	20
Adri Jacobs	11					11	22 (substituted in)	22 (substituted in)	4	2	0	0	0	10
Vuyo Mbotho	12	12	12	12	12	12	12	12	8	1	0	0	0	5
Tyler Fisher	13	13	13	13	13	13	13	13	8	1	0	0	0	5
Alshaun Bock	14	11	11	11	11	22 (substituted in)	11	11	8	1	0	0	0	5
Ganfried May	15	22 (substituted in)	22 (substituted in)	22 (substituted in)	22 (substituted in)				5	0	0	0	0	0
Le Roux Baard	16 (substituted in)	16 (substituted in)	16 (substituted in)	19 (substituted in)	16 (substituted in)	16 (substituted in)	16 (substituted in)	16 (substituted in)	8	0	0	0	0	0
Qhama Hina	17 (substituted in)					18 (substituted in)			2	0	0	0	0	0
Wynand Grassmann	18 (substituted in)	7	5	5	7		5	5	7	1	0	0	0	5
Janneman Stander	19 (substituted in)	6	6	6	20 (substituted in)	6	6	6	8	1	0	0	0	5
Dillin Snel	20 (substituted in)	20 (substituted in)	20 (substituted in)	20 (substituted in)		9			5	0	0	0	0	0
Divan Nel	21 (substituted in)	10	10	10	10	10	10	10	8	0	20	14	0	82
Kirsten Heyns	22 (substituted in)	21 (substituted in)	21 (substituted in)	21 (substituted in)	21 (substituted in)	21 (substituted in)	21 (substituted in)	21 (substituted in)	8	3	0	0	0	15
Marlo Weich		14	14	14	14	14	14	14	7	7	0	0	0	35
Dewald Dekker		17 (substituted in)	17 (substituted in)	17	17 (substituted in)	3	18 (substituted in)	18 (substituted in)	6	0	0	0	0	0
Ruben Schoeman		18 (substituted in)	18 (substituted in)	4	4	4	4	4	7	5	0	0	0	25
Johannes Janse van Rensburg			19 (substituted in)	18 (substituted in)	5	5	19 (substituted in)	19 (substituted in)	6	0	0	0	0	0
Reinhardt Stears				16 (substituted in)					1	0	0	0	0	0
Teunis Nieuwoudt					18 (substituted in)	17 (substituted in)	17 (substituted in)	17 (substituted in)	4	0	0	0	0	0
penalty try									–	3	–	–	–	21
Total									8	37	21	15	0	278
Fabian Booysen, JP Duvenage, Aiden Josephs, Leegan Moos, Robbie Petzer, Davon Raubenheimer and Marlou van Niekerk were named in the squad, but not included in a matchday squad.

== Referees ==
The following referees officiated matches in the 2018 Currie Cup First Division:

2018 Currie Cup First Division referees
Aimee Barrett-Theron • Graham Cooper • Ben Crouse • Quinton Immelman • AJ Jacobs • Cwengile Jadezweni • Ruhan Meiring • Paul Mente • Jaco Peyper • Rasta Rasivhenge • Egon Seconds • Archie Sehlako • Ricus van der Hoven • Marius van der Westhuizen

== See also ==
- 2018 Currie Cup Premier Division
- 2018 Rugby Challenge
