= Johan Steyn =

Johan Steyn may refer to:

- Johan Steyn, Baron Steyn (1932–2017), South African / British jurist
- Johan Steyn (rugby union) (born 1995), South African rugby union player
