= Gert Lotter =

Namibian rugby union & cricket player

- Full name: Gerhard Petrus Lotter
- Born: 3 January 1993 (age 33) Windhoek, Namibia
- Height: 1.83 m (6 ft 0 in)
- Weight: 115 kg (18 st 2 lb; 254 lb)
- School: Windhoek High School

Rugby union career
- Position: Hooker / Eighth man
- Current team: Wanderers / Welwitschias
Youth career
- 2006–2011: Namibia
Amateur team(s)
Years	Team	Apps	(Points)
- Wanderers
Senior career
Years	Team	Apps	(Points)
2016–present	Welwitschias	15	(5)
- Correct as of 21 May 2018
International career
Years	Team	Apps	(Points)
2012–2013	Namibia Under-20		
- Cricket career

Cricket information
- Batting: Right-handed
- Role: Wicket-keeper

International information
- National side: Namibia

Domestic team information
- Years: Team
- 2009/10–2010/11: Namibia

Career statistics
Competition	FC	LA	T20
Matches	1	3	1
Runs scored	23	32	19
Batting average	11.50	32.00	19.00
100s/50s	0/0	0/0	0/0
Top score	19	32	19
Catches/stumpings	0/–	0/–	1/–
- Source: CricketArchive, 28 January 2025

Gerhard Petrus Lotter (born 3 January 1993) is a Namibian cricketer and rugby union player.

== Rugby career ==
In rugby union, Lotter usually plays as a hooker, but can also play as an eighth man. He currently plays for Namibian side Welwitschias in the South African Currie Cup qualification series and for Windhoek-based amateur side Wanderers in the Premier League.

He represented Namibia in rugby at youth level since primary school level, as he was included in the Namibia squad that participated at the South African primary schools tournament, the Under-13 Craven Week, held in George in 2006. He was named the captain of the side and scored Namibia's only points in both a 5–38 defeat to Border and a 10–10 draw with Zimbabwe during the competition.

He was also selected to represent Namibia at high school level, playing for them as an eighth man at the 2010 Under-18 Craven Week tournament held in Welkom. He scored two tries – similar to four years earlier, these came in matches against Border Country Districts and Zimbabwe – in their three matches at the tournament. He returned to play in the same competition in 2011, this time held in Kimberley, reverting to his role as a hooker and again scoring a try in their match against Zimbabwe in a 55–18 victory.

He captained the Namibia Under-19 side that won the 2012 African Rugby Under-19 Cup in Zimbabwe, and also represented the Namibia Under-20 side that played at the 2013 IRB Junior World Rugby Trophy held in Chile.

He was included in the Welwitschias squad that played in the 2016 Currie Cup qualification series in South Africa and made his debut for them by starting their opening match of the competition, a 17–32 defeat to a Free State XV in Bloemfontein.

== Cricket career ==
Having made his debut for the side in a miscellaneous match against a Zimbabwe A side, Lotter made his List A debut for the side during the 2009–2010 season, against Gauteng. He did not bat or bowl in the match.

In August 2009, he played for the Under-17 Namibia squad.
