= Mark Pretorius (rugby union) =

South African rugby union player

- Born: 9 June 1992 (age 34) Nelspruit, South Africa
- Height: 1.77 m (5 ft 9 1/2 in)
- Weight: 102 kg (16 st 1 lb; 225 lb)
- School: Hoërskool Nelspruit

Rugby union career
- Position: Hooker
- Current team: Pumas
Youth career
- 2008–2010: Pumas
- 2011–2013: Golden Lions
Amateur team(s)
| Years | Team | Apps | (Points) |
| 2014 | UJ | 1 | (0) |
Senior career
| Years | Team | Apps | (Points) |
| 2013–2015 | Golden Lions XV | 10 | (5) |
| 2015 | Golden Lions | 2 | (0) |
| 2014–2015 | Lions | 2 | (0) |
| 2016 | SWD Eagles | 16 | (50) |
| 2017 | Pumas | 7 | (15) |
- Correct as of 18 May 2018
International career
| Years | Team | Apps | (Points) |
| 2012 | South Africa Under-20 | 4 | (5) |
- Correct as of 18 May 2014

Mark Pretorius (born 9 June 1992 in Nelspruit) is a South African rugby union player who most recently played for the Pumas. His regular position is hooker.

== Career ==
=== Youth and Varsity rugby ===
Pretorius appeared for the Pumas at several youth tournaments, including the Under-16 Grant Khomo Week in 2008 and the Under-18 Craven Week tournament in both 2009 and 2010.

He then moved to Johannesburg-based side the Golden Lions in 2011, where he participated in the 2011 Under-19 Provincial Championship tournament. He also represented them at Under-21 level in 2012 and 2013.

He also made one appearance for UJ in the 2014 Varsity Cup, against UFS Shimlas in Bloemfontein.

=== Senior career ===
==== Golden Lions / Lions ====
His senior debut came for the Golden Lions in the 2013 Vodacom Cup competition, coming on as a second-half substitute in the Golden Lions' all-time record victory, a 161–3 win over the Limpopo Blue Bulls.

Two more Vodacom Cup appearances followed in 2014, before injuries to Robbie Coetzee and Malcolm Marx led to Pretorius' inclusion on the bench for their 2014 Super Rugby match against the Reds, with Pretorius appearing in the 59th minute for his Super Rugby debut.

==== SWD Eagles ====
After 3 seasons in Johannesburg, Pretorius moved to George to join the SWD Eagles prior to the 2016 season.

=== Representative rugby ===
==== 2012 IRB Junior World Championship ====
In 2012, he was selected in the South Africa Under-20 squad for their victorious 2012 IRB Junior World Championship campaign. In the group stages, he started in their opening match against Ireland, he was an unused substitute against Italy and came on during their match against England. He was promoted to the starting line-up for the semi-final match against Argentina and responded by scoring a 36th minute try, securing a starting position for the final against New Zealand, helping them clinch the title with a 22–16 win.
