= Eugene Jantjies =

Namibia international rugby union player

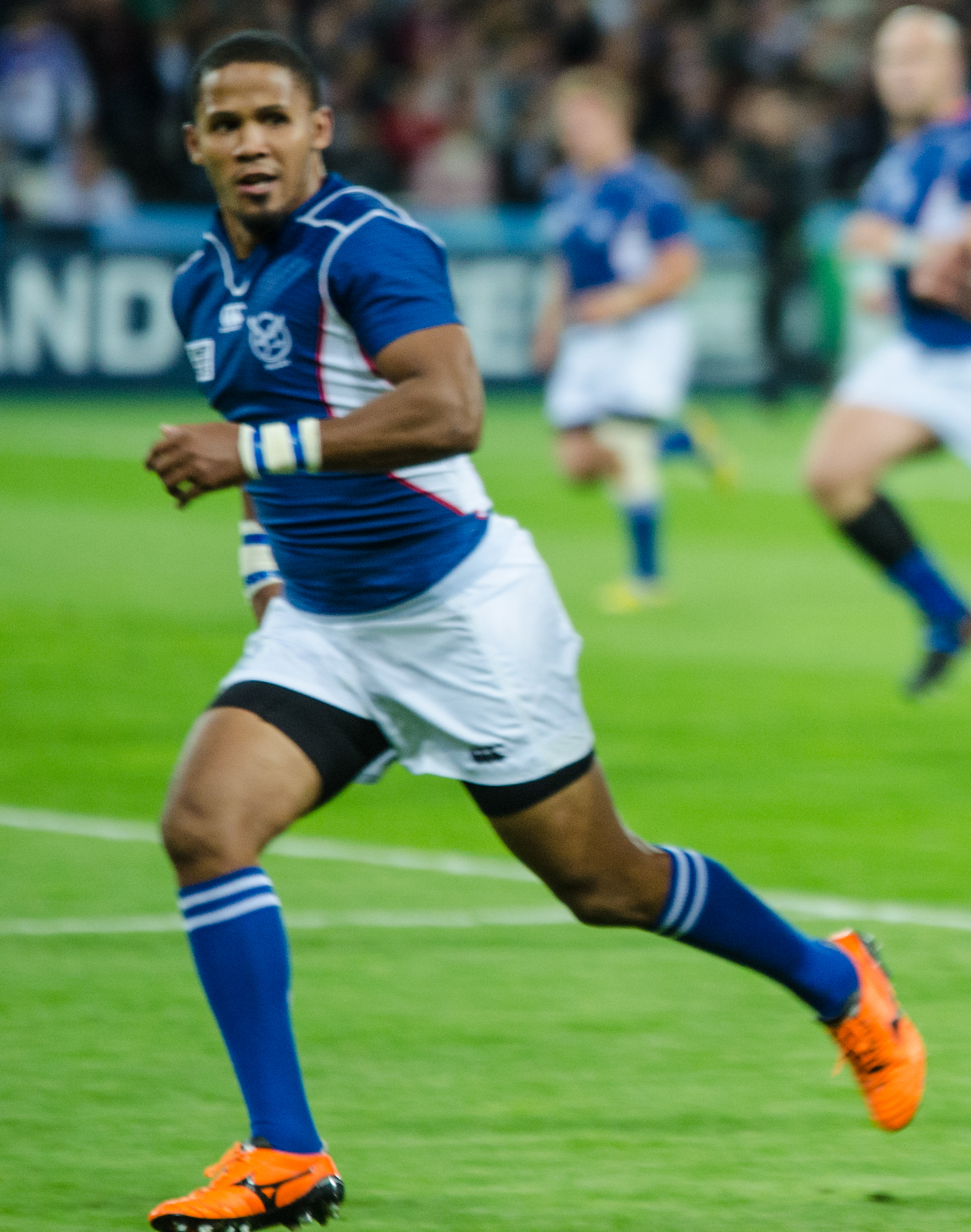
- Full name: Eugene Anthony Jantjies
- Born: 10 August 1986 (age 40) Gobabis, South West Africa
- Height: 1.77 m (5 ft 9 1/2 in)
- Weight: 90 kg (200 lb; 14 st 2 lb)
- School: Windhoek High School

Rugby union career
- Position: Scrum-half
- Current team: Welwitschias
Amateur team(s)
Years	Team	Apps	(Points)
2004–2007	Western Suburbs		
Senior career
Years	Team	Apps	(Points)
2008–2010	Farul Constanţa		
2010–2011	Welwitschias	13	(21)
2012	Leopards	6	(0)
2013–2014	Farul Constanţa	22	(39)
2014	București Wolves	2	(0)
2015	Dinamo București	9	(50)
2016–present	Welwitschias	19	(61)
- Correct as of 21 May 2018
International career
Years	Team	Apps	(Points)
2006–present	Namibia	68	(77)
- Correct as of 14 September 2019

Eugene Jantjies (born 10 August 1986 in Gobabis, South West Africa) is a Namibian rugby union scrum-half, currently playing for the Welwitschias.

== Club career ==
He played for Namibian side Western Suburbs from 2004 to 2007. He then moved to Farul Constanţa, in the Romanian Rugby Championship, where he played from 2008 to 2010, and once again from 2012 to 2014. He played for Namibian side Welwitschias in the South African Vodacom Cup competitions in 2010 and 2011, and for South African side the Leopards in the 2012 Vodacom Cup. He returned to Farul Constanţa for the 2013 and 2014 season before joining Dinamo București for 2015.

In 2016, he returned to Namibia to play for the Welwitschias in the 2016 Currie Cup First Division.

== International career ==
Since his debut in 2006 against Kenya in Windhoek, Jantjies has played in 67 matches for Namibia, which is the overall national record for the most number of Test caps. He has scored four tries, 15 conversions, 8 penalties and one drop goal (77 points on aggregate).

He was called for the 2007 Rugby World Cup in France, playing in four games but without scoring. He was called once again for the 2011 Rugby World Cup in New Zealand, playing in four games and not scoring, and for the 2015 Rugby World Cup in England, where he played in three games and scored a try against Argentina.

His selection for the 2019 Rugby World Cup in Japan makes him the first Namibian to appear in four RWC tournaments.

Jantjies's 50th Test match came off the bench during the 34–32 win against Spain during the 2016 World Rugby Nations Cup tournament in Bucharest.
