= Morné Blom =

Namibia international rugby union player

- Full name: Morné Louis Blom
- Born: 25 April 1989 (age 37) Edenville, South Africa
- Height: 1.96 m (6 ft 5 in)
- Weight: 105 kg (16 st 7 lb; 231 lb)
- School: Windhoek Technical High School

Rugby union career
- Position: Lock / Flanker
Senior career
Years	Team	Apps	(Points)
2010–2011	Welwitschias	14	(10)
2015–2017	Welwitschias	12	(5)
- Correct as of 9 October 2016
International career
Years	Team	Apps	(Points)
2015–2016	Namibia	16	(15)
- Correct as of 26 August 2016

Morné Louis Blom (born 25 April 1989) is a Namibian rugby union player, currently playing with the Namibia national team. His regular position is flanker or lock.

== Rugby career ==
Blom was born in Edenville in South Africa, but grew up in Windhoek. He made his test debut for Namibia in 2010 against Spain. He represented the Welwitschias in the South African domestic Vodacom Cup competition in 2010 and 2011, before the team withdrew due to financial reasons. He again played for the team since their return to South African competitions in 2015.
