= Thor Halvorsen =

South African rugby union player

- Full name: Thorleif Halvorsen
- Born: 9 May 1988 (age 38) Cape Town, South Africa
- Height: 1.92 m (6 ft 3 1/2 in)
- Weight: 108 kg (17 st 0 lb; 238 lb)
- School: Hoër Landbouskool Boland, Paarl
- University: University of South Africa

Rugby union career
- Position: Flanker / No 8 / Lock
- Current team: Rovigo Delta
Youth career
- 2006–2009: Boland Cavaliers
Amateur team(s)
Years	Team	Apps	(Points)
2007	ASRV Ascrum		
Senior career
Years	Team	Apps	(Points)
2010–2013	Boland Cavaliers	39	(15)
2013–2016	Mogliano	56	(45)
2016–2017	SWD Eagles	17	(25)
2017	Mogliano	3	(0)
2018	Boland Cavaliers	1	(0)
2018−2019	Rovigo Delta	20	(20)
2019−2020	Colorno	6	(5)
- Correct as of 23 October 2018

Thorleif Halvorsen (born 9 May 1988 in Cape Town, South Africa) is a South African rugby union player for Rovigo Delta in the Top12 in Italy. He usually plays as a loose forward.

== Rugby career ==
=== Boland Cavaliers ===
Halvorsen played for the Wellington-based Boland Cavaliers at youth level, representing them in the Under-19 Provincial Championships in 2006 and 2007 and in the Under-21 Provincial Championships in 2008 and 2009.

In 2010, he was included in their senior squad for the first time for their 2010 Currie Cup First Division campaign. He made his first class debut on 6 August 2010 in their Round Four match against the SWD Eagles, starting in a 36–45 defeat in George. He made a further two starts and three appearances as a replacement during the remainder of the campaign, helping Boland to finish in third position on the log to qualify for the title play-offs. He was named on the bench for their semi-final match against the Eastern Province Kings, but wasn't used in a 25–26 defeat in Port Elizabeth.

He made five appearances in the 2011 Vodacom Cup competition for a Boland side that finished sixth in the Southern Section of the competition before returning for his second Currie Cup campaign. He made three starts and four appearances as a replacement for them during the regular season, helping them to nine victories out of ten to finish top of the log. He came on as a replacement just before the hour mark in their semi-final match against the Griffons and scored his first try in first class rugby a few minutes after coming on, as his side eased to a 50–20 victory. He also played off the bench in the final, where his team secured a 43–12 win over the Eastern Province Kings to win the title.

He made a single appearance in the 2012 Vodacom Cup – starting in a 22–51 defeat to Western Cape rivals Western Province – but made eight appearances as the team attempted to defend their Currie Cup title. After four appearances as a replacement in rounds two to five, he made four consecutive starts later in the season. It was a disappointing season for the defending champions, winning just three of their fourteen matches and finishing the season in sixth position.

Halvorsen started the 2013 Vodacom Cup season in good form, scoring two first-half tries in a 27–23 victory over a Free State XV in his first appearance of the season. He made a further three appearances, but the team's failed to pick up another victory and eventually finished bottom of the Southern Section log. He made a further six appearances in the 2013 Currie Cup First Division, his last matches in a Boland Cavaliers shirt.

=== Mogliano ===
Halvorsen moved to Italy to join National Championship of Excellence side Mogliano prior to the 2013–14 season. He immediately established himself as the first-choice number eight at Mogliano, starting 18 of their 22 matches during the season and scoring two tries. Mogliano finished in third position on the log and Halvorsen featured in their 19-22 and 30–31 defeats against Rovigo in the two-legged semi-final. In addition to the National Championship of Excellence, Halvorsen also made five appearances in the 2013–14 European Challenge Cup. His side had a poor season in Pool 2 of the competition, however, losing all six of their matches.

In the 2014–2015 season, Halvorsen made 16 appearances – including 14 starts – for Mogliano as the team once again finished in third position on the log. After scoring four tries during the regular season against Rovigo, San Donà, Lazio and Calvisano, he scored his fifth try of the season in the first leg of their semi-final play-off series against Calvisano. However, it wasn't enough as his side lost the match 15–30, and a 24–23 second leg victory wasn't enough to overturn the deficit, which meant Mogliano got eliminated at the semi-final stage for the second season in a row.

As in 2014–15, Halvorsen made 14 starts and two appearances off the bench in the 2015–2016 season. He contributed two tries over the course of the season, helping Mogliano reach the semi-finals for the third season in succession since he joined the club. However, his team was also eliminated at this stage for the third season in a row, losing 10–13 and 17–34 to Rovigo in the two legs of their semi-final play-off matches.

=== SWD Eagles ===
In June 2016, Halvorsen returned to South Africa, joining the George, Western Cape-based SWD Eagles during the 2016 Currie Cup qualification series. He made his Eagles debut in their Round Ten match against the Border Bulldogs, helping them to a 39–22 victory. A week later, he started their match against Namibian side the Welwitschias in Windhoek, scoring his first try in an Eagles shirt in the third minute of the match, the first of fourteen tries that the away side scored in a 96–5 victory.
