= Rudy Joubert =

South African rugby union coach and former footballer (born 1962)

- Born: 13 January 1962 (age 64) South Africa

Rugby union career
Coaching career
- Years: Team
- 1999: Namibia
- 1999: Western Cape

Rudy Joubert (born 13 January 1962) is a South African rugby union coach and a former footballer. He also got a degree on Theology.

He had to leave rugby at a young age, due to an injury. He was technical adviser of South Africa at the 1995 Rugby World Cup finals.

Joubert was the head coach of Namibia in their first appearance at the Rugby World Cup finals, in 1999.

Joubert took on the head coaching of division in the Western Cape in 1999.

Rudy Joubert coached Cardiff in 2001, but was tempted to coach Super Rugby back in his home country and returned to coach the Bulls in 2002 and 2003.

He is currently the Director of Rugby of the Falcons rugby team.

== Accolades ==
In 2003 he was inducted into the University of Pretoria Hall of fame.
