= Juandré Digue =

South African rugby union player

- Full name: Juandré Christiaan Digue
- Born: 9 May 1995 (age 31) Somerset West, South Africa
- Height: 1.85 m (6 ft 1 in)
- Weight: 113 kg (249 lb; 17 st 11 lb)
- School: Hoër Landbouskool Oakdale, Riversdale
- University: Nelson Mandela Metropolitan University, George

Rugby union career
- Position: Loosehead prop
Youth career
- 2008–2015: SWD Eagles
Senior career
Years	Team	Apps	(Points)
2015–2017	SWD Eagles	23	(5)
- Correct as of 29 May 2018

Juandré Christiaan Digue (born 9 May 1995) is a South African rugby union player who most recently played for the SWD Eagles. His regular position is loosehead prop.

== Career ==
=== Youth ===
Digue grew up in Riversdale, where he earned call-ups to represent the SWD Eagles in youth tournaments. He represented them as early as primary school level when he played at the 2008 Under-13 Craven Week tournament held in Paarl.

In 2013, he represented the Eagles at the high school equivalent for the Under-18 Craven Week in Polokwane. He also made five appearances for the SWD U19 team in the 2013 Under-19 Provincial Championship, helping them reach the semi-final of the competition.

In 2014, he represented the SWD Under-19 team, starting six of their seven matches in the 2014 Under-19 Provincial Championship since they missed out on the play-offs on this occasion.

=== SWD Eagles ===
Despite still being in the Under-20 age group in 2015, he became involved with the SWD Eagles senior squad. He was included in their squad for the 2015 Vodacom Cup, but did not appear in any matches. He made his first class debut by starting in a 28–all draw against the Boland Cavaliers in Round Four of the 2015 Currie Cup qualification series. He remained in the starting line-up for their remaining two matches in the competition against the Border Bulldogs and Griquas, but could not prevent the SWD Eagles finish bottom of the log, which meant they qualified for the 2015 Currie Cup First Division. Digue played a single match for the SWD U21 side in the 2015 Under-21 Provincial Championship Group B before rejoining the first team for their Currie Cup First Division campaign. He came on as a replacement in their opening match against the Leopards, before starting their remaining four matches in the regular season. He helped them to four wins out of four, to end the competition in third position on the log to qualify for the semi-finals. Digue started their 47–40 victory over defending champions the Griffons in the semi-final, and also started in the final, which the Leopards won 44–20 in Potchefstroom.

At the start of 2016, the Southern Kings Super Rugby team invited players from the Border Bulldogs, Sharks and SWD Eagles to join training for a trial period as they prepared for the 2016 Super Rugby season. Although Digue wasn't included in the original group of players, he joined the training squad a week later. However, he returned to SWD Eagles after he failed to be contracted for the Super Rugby side.

=== Statistics ===
First class career
Season	Teams	Currie Cup First Division		Currie Cup qualification		Total	
Season	Teams	Apps	Pts	Apps	Pts	Apps	Pts
2015	SWD Eagles	7	0	3	0	10	0
2015–present	SWD Eagles Total	7	0	3	0	10	0
2015–present	Career Total	7	0	3	0	10	0

== Personal life ==
Digue began working as a primary school teacher in Knysna in January 2018.
