= Louis Venter =

South African rugby union player

- Full name: Louis Gideon du Preez Venter
- Born: 5 September 1994 (age 32) Pretoria, South Africa
- Height: 1.70 m (5 ft 7 in)
- Weight: 81 kg (179 lb; 12 st 11 lb)
- School: Afrikaanse Hoër Seunskool
- University: University of the Free State

Rugby union career
- Position: Scrum-half
- Current team: Griquas
Youth career
- 2007–2010: Blue Bulls
- 2013–2015: Free State Cheetahs
Senior career
Years	Team	Apps	(Points)
2015	Free State XV	2	(5)
2016–2017	Griffons	27	(20)
2018–present	Griquas	8	(15)
- Correct as of 27 October 2018

Louis Gideon du Preez Venter (born 5 September 1994) is a South African rugby union player for Griquas in the Currie Cup and the Rugby Challenge. His regular position is scrumhalf.
