= Lukhanyo Nomzanga =

South African rugby union player

- Full name: Lukhanyo Welcome Nomzanga
- Born: 8 October 1987 (age 39) King William's Town, South Africa
- Height: 1.80 m (5 ft 11 in)
- Weight: 97 kg (15 st 4 lb; 214 lb)
- School: Forbes Grant Senior Secondary School

Rugby union career
- Position: Flanker
Amateur team(s)
Years	Team	Apps	(Points)
–2012	Belhar		
2013	False Bay		
Senior career
Years	Team	Apps	(Points)
2014–2018	Border Bulldogs	57	(10)
- Correct as of 27 October 2018

Lukhanyo Welcome Nomzanga (born 8 October 1987) is a South African rugby union player, who last played first class rugby as a flanker for the Border Bulldogs in the Currie Cup and in the Rugby Challenge.

== Rugby career ==
=== Amateur rugby ===
Nomzanga was born in King William's Town in the Eastern Cape, but played amateur club rugby in the Western Cape, playing for Belhar and False Bay. He was also selected in a Western Province Amateur team that competed in the national provincial competition in 2012.

=== Border Bulldogs ===
Nomzanga returned to the Eastern Cape to join the Border Bulldogs prior to their 2014 Currie Cup qualification series and made his first class debut in the team's 12–37 defeat to the Boland Cavaliers. He started a total of five matches in the qualification campaign that saw them finish bottom of the log with six defeats and four more starts in the 2014 Currie Cup First Division, where they also finished last.

In 2015, Nomzanga made six appearances in the 2015 Vodacom Cup and another six in the 2015 Currie Cup qualification series. He didn't play in the First Division, but returned the following year to play in eleven of the Bulldogs' matches in the 2015 Currie Cup qualification series.

In July 2016, it was revealed that Nomzanga received a ban from the sport after failing a drugs test. He tested positively for methylhexaneamine and initially received an eight-month ban, which was due to rule him out of action until March 2017. However, he returned to action for the Bulldogs in September 2016, coming on as a replacement in their victory over the Falcons.
