= Bradley Moolman =

South African rugby union player

- Full name: Bradley Johannes Moolman
- Born: 18 January 1991 (age 35) Welkom, South Africa
- Height: 1.80 m (5 ft 11 in)
- Weight: 90 kg (14 st 2 lb; 198 lb)
- School: Monument High School (Krugersdorp)
- Notable relative: Whestley Moolman (brother)

Rugby union career
- Position: Outside centre
- Current team: Leopards
Youth career
- 2007–2009: Golden Lions
- 2010–2012: Blue Bulls
Amateur team(s)
Years	Team	Apps	(Points)
2013–2016	UJ	23	(19)
Senior career
Years	Team	Apps	(Points)
2011	Blue Bulls	4	(0)
2012–2013	Golden Lions XV	8	(20)
2016–present	Leopards	52	(80)
- Correct as of 1 July 2019
International career
Years	Team	Apps	(Points)
2011	South Africa Under-20		
- Correct as of 9 October 2013

Bradley Johannes Moolman (born 18 January 1991 in Welkom) is a South African rugby union footballer currently playing for the Leopards. His regular playing position is outside centre.

He represented the Golden Lions in the Currie Cup and Vodacom Cup in 2012 and 2013, having previously played for the Blue Bulls before making the move to Johannesburg along with brother Whestley ahead of the 2012 season.

He left the Golden Lions at the end of 2013 to join the Western Force Academy in Perth.
