= Johan Steyn (rugby union) =

South African rugby union player

- Full name: Johannes Hermanus Steyn
- Born: 8 October 1995 (age 31) Oudtshoorn, South Africa
- Height: 1.78 m (5 ft 10 in)
- Weight: 90 kg (200 lb; 14 st 2 lb)
- School: Langenhoven Gimnasium
- University: Nelson Mandela Metropolitan University / University of South Africa

Rugby union career
- Position: Scrum-half
Youth career
- 2008–2015: SWD Eagles
Senior career
Years	Team	Apps	(Points)
2015–2018	SWD Eagles	55	(45)
2017	Southern Kings	8	(0)
- Correct as of 3 November 2018

Johannes Hermanus Steyn (born 8 October 1995) is a South African rugby union player who last played in the Currie Cup with the SWD Eagles. His regular position is at scrum-half.

== Rugby career ==
=== 2008–2014 : Schoolboy / SWD Under-19 rugby ===
Steyn was born and grew up in Oudtshoorn. His rugby talent was spotted as early as primary school level, when he was included in the Under-13 squad of his local provincial side, the SWD Eagles, for the 2008 Craven Week tournament in Paarl.

In 2011, he represented SWD at the Under-16 Grant Khomo Week in Queenstown and he was also included in a World Sport Barbarians team that competed in Portugal and Spain, where Steyn was named the best backline player. He also broke through to his school Langenhoven Gimnasium's first team in 2011. In 2012, he was named the vice=captain of his school team and was selected to represent the SWD, this time at the Under-18 Academy Week held IN Wellington. He captained the team and was voted the best backline player of the competition.

He captained his school side in 2012, and was again selected to captain the SWD team at the Under-18 Academy Week held at Glenwood High School in Durban. He led his team to three victories at the tournament, scoring a try in their match against the Golden Lions. He was also included in the SWD U19 squad for their participation in the 2013 Under-19 Provincial Championship. He appeared in their final four matches of the regular season, as the team finished fourth in Group B to secure a title play-off berth. He scored 11 points for his side in their semi-final match against Falcons U19, but it was in vain as the side from the East Rand won 29–24. Steyn was again named his team's best backline player for the competition.

After school, Steyn moved to George to join the SWD Eagles academy. He made three starts for the SWD U19 team in the 2014 Under-19 Provincial Championship, scoring 12 points with the boot as the team finished in sixth place, missing out on the play-offs.

=== 2015–2016 : SWD Eagles ===
Steyn was included in the SWD Eagles squad for the 2015 Vodacom Cup. He was named in the starting lineup for their match against a Free State XV in their opening match of the competition, making his first class debut in a 33–17 victory. He also started their next match against Griquas in his only other appearance in the competition. He made four starts for the team in the 2015 Currie Cup qualification series; his first start in this competition was against the Leopards in a 17–45 defeat and he scored his first try in his next outing, a 28–all draw against the Boland Cavaliers. The SWD Eagles finished bottom of the log with a single victory to their name, which meant they would play in the Currie Cup First Division for the remainder of the season. After a single appearance for the SWD U21 team in the Under-21 Provincial Championship, Steyn returned to the first team, where he featured in all five of their matches during the First Division regular season. The team recovered from their poor showing in the qualification series, winning four matches to finish in third spot on the log. Steyn started their semi-final match against the Griffons in Welkom, where a 47–40 victory for the team from George saw them qualify for the final, and in the final against the Leopards, but the team fell short, losing 20–44 in Potchefstroom.

Steyn played in all fourteen of the SWD Eagles' matches in the 2016 Currie Cup qualification competition, starting nine of those and playing off the bench in five matches. He scored tries against the Leopards and the Free State XV as the Eagles finished in 11th place. He started in four of their five matches during the 2016 Currie Cup First Division and scored tries against Namibian side the Welwitschias in a 54–23 win and against the Griffons in a 27–33 defeat, but it wasn't enough to help the team secure a semi-final spot, eventually finishing in fifth place.

=== 2017–present : Kings ===
In November 2016, the Southern Kings Super Rugby team announced that they contracted Steyn for the 2017 Super Rugby season.
