= PW Botha (rugby union) =

South African rugby union player

- Full name: Pieter Willem Botha
- Born: 24 May 1991 (age 35) Durban, South Africa
- Height: 1.85 m (6 ft 1 in)
- Weight: 117 kg (18 st 6 lb; 258 lb)
- School: Ficksburg High School, Ficksburg

Rugby union career
- Position: Loosehead prop
- Current team: Griffons
Youth career
- 2007–2012: Griffons
Senior career
Years	Team	Apps	(Points)
2012–2013	Glendale Raptors	23	(25)
2014–2018	Griffons	25	(0)
- Correct as of 27 October 2018

Pieter Willem Botha (born 24 May 1991 in Durban, South Africa) is a South African rugby union player who last played for the Griffons. His regular position is loosehead prop.

== Career ==
=== Youth ===
In 2007, he earned his first selection at provincial level when he was chosen for the Griffons side that played at the Under-16 Grant Khomo Week. He also represented the Griffons Country Districts side at the Under-18 Academy Week in 2008 and the Griffons' Under-18 side at the Craven Week in 2009.

In 2012, he played for the Griffons U21 side in the 2012 Under-21 Provincial Championship, scoring two tries in six starts in the competition.

=== Glendale Raptors ===
In 2012, he joined the United States-based side the Glendale Raptors for two seasons under head coach and former Springbok André Snyman. He featured in all the spring season games and helped them reach the National Division 1. In 2013, the Raptors got promoted to the inaugural Elite Cup where they just missed a play-off spot.

=== Griffons ===
He made the step up to the senior side in 2014. He was included in their squad for the 2014 Vodacom Cup and came on as a substitute in a 62–10 victory over the Limpopo Blue Bulls in Bultfontein to make his first class debut at the age of 22. He also played off the bench in their next match against Griquas before making his first senior start, playing the first hour of their 69–5 loss to Mpumalanga-based side Pumas in Welkom. He started two more matches as the Griffons finished sixth in the Northern Section and failed to qualify for the semi-finals.

His Currie Cup debut came a few months later. He played off the bench in the Griffons' 27–25 victory over the Boland Cavaliers in Welkom. He started one match during the competition and made a further three substitute appearances as the Griffons finished third to qualify for the 2014 Currie Cup First Division. He made an additional two substitute appearances in the First Division as the Griffons won the competition, their first trophy for six years.
