= Gavin Annandale =

South African rugby union player

- Full name: Gavin Barnard Annandale
- Born: 27 April 1989 (age 37) Welkom, South Africa
- Height: 1.94 m (6 ft 4 1/2 in)
- Weight: 112 kg (17 st 9 lb; 247 lb)
- School: Hoërskool Brandwag, Benoni
- University: Central University of Technology

Rugby union career
- Position: Lock / Flanker
- Current team: Griffons
Youth career
- 2005–2007: Falcons
- 2008–2010: Free State Cheetahs
Amateur team(s)
Years	Team	Apps	(Points)
2012	CUT Ixias	9	(20)
Senior career
Years	Team	Apps	(Points)
2009	Falcons	5	(0)
2010–2012	Griffons	27	(10)
2013	Golden Lions XV	2	(0)
2013	Leopards	1	(0)
2014–2015	Boland Cavaliers	27	(5)
2014	→ Western Province	1	(0)
2016–present	Griffons	56	(15)
- Correct as of 1 July 2019

Gavin Barnard Annandale (born 27 April 1989 in Welkom) is a South African rugby union player, currently playing with the Griffons. His regular position is lock.

== Career ==
=== Youth ===
Annandale played high school rugby for Hoërskool Brandwag in Benoni, also captaining the side in 2007. He was also included in a few youth provincial tournaments; he played for the Falcons' Under-16 side at the Grant Khomo Week in 2005 and for their Under-18 side at the 2006 Academy Week and 2007 Craven Week tournaments. He was also included in the Falcons U19 squads that participated in the 2006 and 2007 Under-19 Provincial Championship competitions.

In 2008, he moved to Bloemfontein to attend the Central University of Technology where he represented the Free State U19 side in the 2008 Under-19 Provincial Championship.

=== Falcons ===
He made his first class debut in 2009, playing for the Falcons in the 2009 Vodacom Cup competition, starting in their 65–12 opening day defeat against Griquas in Kimberley and made a total of five appearances for the Falcons during the competition.

=== Griffons / CUT Ixias ===
However, he continued his rugby career in the Free State. He played for Welkom-based side the Griffons during the 2010 Vodacom Cup competition, making three appearances. He also played for the Free State U21 side in the Under-21 Provincial Championship in the latter half of the season. He was included in university side CUT Ixias' squad for the 2011 Varsity Shield competition, but failed to make any appearances, but (after appearing in a compulsory friendly match for the Griffons against the Blue Bulls) made his Currie Cup debut later in 2011. He started in their first match of the season against his former side the Falcons in Kempton Park and marked the occasion by also scoring his first senior try by opening the scoring for the Griffons in the 17th minute of the match. He made a total of eleven appearances in the competition, starting six of those and helping the Griffons reach the semi-finals.

Annandale played his first Varsity Shield campaign in 2012 with CUT Ixias, helping them top the log after the round-robin stages, but ultimately falling short by losing to Wits in the final. Annandale played in all nine of their matches during the competition and scored four tries. He then played in the remainder of the Griffons' 2012 Vodacom Cup season, making three appearances, and played in a further nine matches during the 2012 Currie Cup First Division season.

=== Golden Lions ===
He returned to Gauteng prior to the 2013 season by joining the Golden Lions as they recruited a number of youth players following the Lions' omission from the 2013 Super Rugby season. He made three appearances for them during 2013 Vodacom Cup, a competition they eventually won. Annandale played in two matches during the round-robin stages and also played off the bench in their semi-final victory over Western Province.

=== Leopards ===
He was included in the Golden Lions squad for the 2013 Currie Cup Premier Division season, he was never included in a matchday squad. Instead, he made one single appearance on loan to Potchefstroom-based side the Leopards in the 2013 Currie Cup First Division, playing off the bench in their match against the Border Bulldogs.

=== Boland Cavaliers ===
He was on the move again in 2014 as he joined Wellington-based side Boland Cavaliers for the 2014 Currie Cup qualification tournament. He made his debut for them against his old side the Griffons in a 27–25 defeat.
