= Blake Kyd =

South African rugby union player

- Full name: Blake Jonathan Kyd
- Born: 10 June 1988 (age 38) Pietermaritzburg, South Africa
- Height: 1.78 m (5 ft 10 in)
- Weight: 110 kg (17 st 5 lb; 243 lb)
- School: Maritzburg College
- University: University of South Africa
- Occupation(s): Teacher and Coach

Rugby union career
- Position: Prop
- Current team: Border Bulldogs
Youth career
- 2006: Sharks
Senior career
| Years | Team | Apps | (Points) |
| 2012-2019 | Border Bulldogs | 114 | (15) |
- Correct as of 23 November 2023

Blake Jonathan Kyd (born 10 June 1988) was a South African rugby union player, well-known for playing and captaining the Border Bulldogs. His regular position is prop. He is currently a grade 7 teacher and the head of rugby at Gonubie Primary School

Currently a Melksham Rugby Club legend and a dab hand in the kitchen.

== Career ==
He played for the Sharks at the 2006 Under–18 Academy Week tournament, but he didn't make his first class debut until six years later.

He joined the Border Bulldogs in 2012 and made his debut against the Sharks XV in the 2012 Vodacom Cup. He became a regular for the Border Bulldogs, however, playing in the majority of their games in both the Vodacom Cup and Currie Cup competitions.

He has since become a qualified teacher and has had many successful years of coaching schoolboy rugby. Blake has coached at provincial level 3 times: Border U16 Grant Khomo team 2022-2023; and Border U13 Craven Week 2019. Blake is also a founder of Monster Maulerz Rugby Academy in East London, which aims to develop rugby in the border region. Blake's coaching age range is from U7 - to club rugby. Blake is a Level 2 registered rugby coach.
