= 2018 Rugby Challenge =

2018 rugby union competition in South Africa

- Countries: South Africa; Namibia
- Date: 21 April – 15 July 2018
- Champions: Pumas (1st title)
- Runners-up: Griquas
- Matches played: 67
- Tries scored: 615 (average 9.2 per match)
- Top point scorer: Chris Smith, Pumas (131)
- Top try scorer: Enver Brandt, Griquas (11)

The 2018 Rugby Challenge – known as the SuperSport Rugby Challenge for sponsorship reasons – was the second edition of the Rugby Challenge, the secondary domestic rugby union competition in South Africa. The competition was organised by the South African Rugby Union and was played between 21 April and 15 July 2018. The competition featured all fourteen South African provincial unions plus Namibian side the Welwitschias.

The competition was won by the Pumas for the first time, after they beat Griquas 32–30 in the final in Oudtshoorn. Pumas fly-half Chris Smith was the top scorer in the competition with 131 points, while Griquas wing Enver Brandt was the top try scorer with 11 tries.

== Competition rules and information ==
The fifteen teams in the competition were divided into three regional sections of five teams. Each team played home and away matches against the other four teams in their section over a ten-week period. The top two teams from each pool, along with the two third-placed teams with the best record progressed to the play-offs, which consisted of quarter finals, a semi-final and a final.

== Teams ==
The teams that competed in the 2018 Rugby Challenge are:

Location of teams in the 2018 Rugby Challenge
Northern Section
Central Section
Southern Section

Northern Section
Team	Sponsored Name
Blue Bulls XV	Vodacom Blue Bulls XV
Falcons	Hino Valke
Golden Lions XV	Xerox Golden Lions XV
Pumas	iCollege Pumas
Welwitschias	Windhoek Draught Welwitschias

Central Section
Team	Sponsored Name
Free State XV	Toyota Free State XV
Griffons	Down Touch Griffons
Griquas	Tafel Lager Griquas
Leopards	Leopards
Sharks XV	Cell C Sharks XV

Southern Section
Team	Sponsored Name
Boland Cavaliers	Boland Cavaliers
Border Bulldogs	Border Bulldogs
Eastern Province Elephants	Eastern Province Elephants
SWD Eagles	SWD Eagles
Western Province	DHL Western Province

== Northern Section ==
=== Log ===
2018 Rugby Challenge Northern Section log
Pos	Team	P	W	D	L	PF	PA	PD	TF	TA	TB	LB	Pts
1	Pumas	8	8	0	0	408	152	+256	55	22	7	0	39
2	Golden Lions XV	8	5	0	3	375	221	+154	54	30	7	1	28
3	Blue Bulls XV	8	5	0	3	317	255	+62	47	32	7	0	27
4	Falcons	8	1	0	7	208	367	−159	30	52	6	1	11
5	Welwitschias	8	1	0	7	152	465	−313	20	70	3	0	7

- The Pumas and the Golden Lions XV qualified for the quarterfinals as section winners and runners-up respectively. The Blue Bulls XV also qualified as a best third-placed team.

=== Round-by-round ===
The table below shows each team's progression throughout the season. For each round, each team's cumulative points total is shown with the overall log position in brackets.

Team Progression – Northern Section
Team	R1	R2	R3	R4	R5	R6	R7	R8	R9	R10	QF	SF	F
Pumas	4 (2nd)	9 (1st)	9 (2nd)	14 (1st)	19 (1st)	24 (1st)	29 (1st)	29 (1st)	34 (1st)	39 (1st)	Won	Won	Won
Golden Lions XV	0 (3rd)	1 (4th)	6 (4th)	11 (2nd)	12 (3rd)	12 (3rd)	13 (3rd)	18 (3rd)	23 (3rd)	28 (2nd)	Lost	—N/a	—N/a
Blue Bulls XV	0 (4th)	5 (2nd)	10 (1st)	10 (3rd)	15 (2nd)	16 (2nd)	21 (2nd)	26 (2nd)	26 (2nd)	27 (3rd)	Lost	—N/a	—N/a
Falcons	5 (1st)	5 (3rd)	6 (3rd)	6 (4th)	6 (4th)	7 (4th)	7 (4th)	9 (4th)	10 (4th)	11 (4th)	—N/a	—N/a	—N/a
Welwitschias	0 (5th)	0 (5th)	1 (5th)	1 (5th)	1 (5th)	6 (5th)	7 (5th)	7 (5th)	7 (5th)	7 (5th)	—N/a	—N/a	—N/a
Key:	win	draw	loss	bye									

=== Matches ===
==== Round One ====
21 April 2018	Pumas	36–18	Blue Bulls XV	Nelspruit Rugby Club
15:00	Try: Nardus van der Walt; Stefan Ungerer; JP Lewis; Con: Chris Smith (3); Pen: Chris Smith (5)	Scoreboard	Try: Earll Douwrie; Xolisa Guma; Con: Earll Douwrie; Pen: Earll Douwrie (2)	Referee: Jaco Pretorius

21 April 2018	Welwitschias	7–39	Falcons	Hage Geingob Stadium, Windhoek
16:00	Try: Janré du Toit; Con: Eugene Jantjies	Scoreboard	Try: Friedle Olivier (2); André du Plessis; Don Mlondobozi; Andries Schutte; Nazeem Wood; Con: André du Plessis (2); Errol Jaggers; Pen: André du Plessis	Referee: Paul Mente

Bye/s: Golden Lions XV

==== Round Two ====
28 April 2018	Golden Lions XV	26–35	Pumas	Wits Rugby Stadium, Johannesburg
13:00	Try: Corné Fourie; Rhyno Herbst; Shaun Reynolds; Siya Masuku; Con: Shaun Reynolds (3)	Scoreboard	Try: De-Jay Terblanche; JP Lewis (2); Devon Williams; Con: Chris Smith (3); Pen: Chris Smith (3)	Referee: Rasta Rasivhenge

28 April 2018	Blue Bulls XV	73–20	Welwitschias	Loftus Versfeld, Pretoria
14:30	Try: Corniel Els; Ruben van Heerden; Andell Loubser (2); JT Jackson (2); Earll Douwrie; Jan-Henning Campher; André Warner; Duncan Matthews (2); Con: Earll Douwrie (9)	Scoreboard	Try: AJ de Klerk; Adriaan Booysen; Con: Eugene Jantjies; PW Steenkamp; Pen: PW Steenkamp (2)	Referee: Archie Sehlako

Bye/s: Falcons

==== Round Three ====
5 May 2018	Falcons	35–64	Blue Bulls XV	Barnard Stadium, Kempton Park
15:00	Try: Jacques Alberts; André du Plessis; Etienne Taljaard; Lundi Ralarala; Jan Enslin; Con: André du Plessis (3); Errol Jaggers (2)	Scoreboard	Try: Matthys Basson; Embrose Papier (3); Xolisa Guma; Ulrich Beyers (3); Corniel Els; Marius Verwey; Con: Francois Brummer; Earll Douwrie (6)	Referee: Ben Crouse

5 May 2018	Welwitschias	35–45	Golden Lions XV	Hage Geingob Stadium, Windhoek
16:00	Try: Leneve Damens; PW Steenkamp; Johann Tromp; Darryl de la Harpe; JC Greyling; Con: TC Kisting; PW Steenkamp (4)	Scoreboard	Try: Bradley Thain (2); Shaun Reynolds; Ronald Brown; Wayne van der Bank; Pieter Jansen (2); Con: Shaun Reynolds (5)	Referee: Jaco Pretorius

Bye/s: Pumas

==== Round Four ====
12 May 2018	Falcons	12–68	Golden Lions XV	Barnard Stadium, Kempton Park
15:00	Try: Thabo Mabuza; Lundi Ralarala; Con: Errol Jaggers	Scoreboard	Try: Phumzile Maqondwana; Vincent Tshituka; James Venter; Shaun Reynolds (3); Jan-Louis la Grange (2); Jeanluc Cilliers; Corné Fourie; Con: Shaun Reynolds (6); Siya Masuku (3)	Referee: Cwengile Jadezweni

12 May 2018	Welwitschias	12–54	Pumas	Hage Geingob Stadium, Windhoek
16:00	Try: PW Steenkamp (2); Con: PW Steenkamp	Scoreboard	Try: Cameron Lindsay; Jeandré Rudolph; Ruwellyn Isbell; Henko Marais; JP Lewis; Hugo Kloppers; Abrie Griesel penalty try Con: Justin van Staden (6)	Referee: Stephan Geldenhuys

Bye/s: Blue Bulls XV

==== Round Five ====
19 May 2018	Pumas	54–7	Falcons	Mbombela Stadium, Mbombela
15:00	Try: Marko Janse van Rensburg; Ruwellyn Isbell (5); Hennie Skorbinski; JP Lewis; Con: Chris Smith (6); Justin van Staden	Scoreboard	Try: Anrich Richter; Con: Andrew van Wyk	Referee: Paul Mente

20 May 2018	Blue Bulls XV	27–20	Golden Lions XV	Bridgton Sports Grounds, Oudtshoorn
13:00	Try: Boom Prinsloo; Duncan Matthews; Johan Grobbelaar; Jamba Ulengo; Con: Francois Brummer; Earll Douwrie; Pen: Earll Douwrie	Scoreboard	Try: Vincent Tshituka; Siya Masuku; Con: Jeanluc Cilliers; Siya Masuku; Pen: Jeanluc Cilliers (2)	Referee: Ruhan Meiring

Bye/s: Welwitschias

==== Round Six ====
26 May 2018	Blue Bulls XV	22–34	Pumas	Loftus Versfeld, Pretoria
12:15	Try: Edgar Marutlulle; Jamba Ulengo; JT Jackson; Jaco Bezuidenhout; Con: Earll Douwrie	Scoreboard	Try: Marko Janse van Rensburg; Ruwellyn Isbell (2); Trompie Pretorius; Con: Chris Smith (3); Justin van Staden; Pen: Chris Smith (2)	Referee: Archie Sehlako

26 May 2018	Falcons	24–34	Welwitschias	Barnard Stadium, Kempton Park
15:00	Try: Thabo Mabuza; Andrew van Wyk; Marco Klopper; Martin Sithole; Con: André du Plessis (2)	Scoreboard	Try: JC Winckler; PW Steenkamp; Janré du Toit; Johann Tromp; Con: PW Steenkamp (4); Pen: PW Steenkamp (2)	Referee: Vusi Msibi

Bye/s: Golden Lions XV

==== Round Seven ====
2 June 2018	Welwitschias	31–47	Blue Bulls XV	Hage Geingob Stadium, Windhoek
16:00	Try: Rohan Kitshoff; Darryl de la Harpe; Johann Tromp; Niël van Vuuren; JC Greyling; Con: PW Steenkamp (3)	Scoreboard	Try: Nqoba Mxoli; Johan Grobbelaar; Jamba Ulengo; Franco Naudé; Xolisa Guma (2); Matthys Basson; Con: Andell Loubser (6)	Referee: Jaco Pretorius

2 June 2018	Pumas	43–35	Golden Lions XV	Mbombela Stadium, Mbombela
15:00	Try: Stefan Willemse; Willie Engelbrecht; Stefan Ungerer; Gerrit Smith; Frank Herne; Alwayno Visagie; Con: Barend Smit; Justin van Staden (4); Pen: Justin van Staden	Scoreboard	Try: Sti Sithole; Wayne van der Bank; Jan-Louis la Grange; Marco Jansen van Vuren; Howard Mnisi; Con: Shaun Reynolds (5)	Referee: AJ Jacobs

Bye/s: Falcons

==== Round Eight ====
8 June 2018	Blue Bulls XV	37–32	Falcons	Loftus Versfeld, Pretoria
15:00	Try: Earll Douwrie; Nqoba Mxoli; Lian du Toit; Johan Grobbelaar; Jano Venter; Con: Earll Douwrie (3); Pen: Earll Douwrie (2)	Scoreboard	Try: Marco Klopper; Jacques Alberts; Robey Leibrandt; Martin Sithole; Con: André du Plessis (3); Pen: André du Plessis (2)	Referee: Cwengile Jadezweni

8 June 2018	Golden Lions XV	89–10	Welwitschias	Wits Rugby Stadium, Johannesburg
15:00	Try: Stephen Bhasera; Phumzile Maqondwana (2); Morné van den Berg; Siya Masuku; Anthony Volmink; Eddie Fouché; Wayne van der Bank (2); Selom Gavor; Darrien Landsberg; Austin Davids penalty try Con: Siya Masuku (5); Jeanluc Cilliers (6)	Scoreboard	Try: JC Winckler; Con: Dirk von Weidts; Pen: Aurelio Plato	Referee: Stephan Geldenhuys

Bye/s: Pumas

==== Round Nine ====
15 June 2018	Golden Lions XV	45–30	Falcons	Emirates Airline Park, Johannesburg
15:00	Try: Chergin Fillies; James Venter; Vincent Tshituka; Anthony Volmink; Morné van den Berg; Courtnall Skosan; Con: Jeanluc Cilliers (6); Pen: Jeanluc Cilliers	Scoreboard	Try: Etienne Taljaard (2); Hardus Pretorius (2); Con: André du Plessis (2); Pen: André du Plessis; Errol Jaggers	Referee: Stephan Geldenhuys

16 June 2018	Pumas	94–3	Welwitschias	Sasol Secunda
15:00	Try: Simon Westraadt (2); Le Roux Roets; Reynier van Rooyen (2); Hennie Skorbinski; Alwayno Visagie; Morné Joubert (3); Devon Williams (3); Stefan Ungerer; Con: Barend Smit (3); Chris Smith (9)	Scoreboard	Pen: Tuna Amutenya	Referee: Jaco Pretorius

Bye/s: Blue Bulls XV

==== Round Ten ====
24 June 2018	Falcons	29–58	Pumas	Bill Jardine Stadium, Johannesburg
13:00	Try: Andrew Volschenk; Etienne Taljaard; Andries Truter (2); Con: Anrich Richter (2); Warren Potgieter; Pen: Anrich Richter	Scoreboard	Try: Marko Janse van Rensburg (3); Le Roux Roets; Jeandré Rudolph; Willie Engelbrecht; Ryan Nell; Devon Williams; Con: Chris Smith (5); Barend Smit; Pen: Chris Smith (2)	Referee: Stephan Geldenhuys

24 June 2018	Golden Lions XV	47–29	Blue Bulls XV	Bill Jardine Stadium, Johannesburg
15:00	Try: James Venter; Courtnall Skosan (3); Ruan Combrinck (2); Jacques van Rooyen; Con: Shaun Reynolds (5); Ashlon Davids	Scoreboard	Try: Jason Jenkins; Hanro Liebenberg; Ruben van Heerden; Franco Naudé; Con: Manie Libbok (3); Pen: Manie Libbok	Referee: Paul Mente

Bye/s: Welwitschias

== Central Section ==
=== Log ===
2018 Rugby Challenge Central Section log
Pos	Team	P	W	D	L	PF	PA	PD	TF	TA	TB	LB	Pts
1	Griquas	8	7	0	1	347	231	+116	47	34	7	1	36
2	Sharks XV	8	5	0	3	312	238	+74	45	35	7	2	29
3	Free State XV	8	6	0	2	251	212	+39	37	27	5	0	29
4	Griffons	8	1	0	7	265	301	−36	41	41	7	4	15
5	Leopards	8	1	0	7	202	395	−193	26	59	4	0	8

- Griquas and the Sharks XV qualified for the quarterfinals as section winners and runners-up respectively. The Free State XV also qualified as a best third-placed team.

=== Round-by-round ===
The table below shows each team's progression throughout the season. For each round, each team's cumulative points total is shown with the overall log position in brackets.

Team Progression – Central Section
Team	R1	R2	R3	R4	R5	R6	R7	R8	R9	R10	QF	SF	F
Griquas	5 (2nd)	10 (1st)	10 (1st)	12 (2nd)	17 (2nd)	22 (2nd)	22 (2nd)	26 (2nd)	31 (1st)	36 (1st)	Won	Won	Lost
Sharks XV	1 (3rd)	1 (4th)	6 (4th)	11 (3rd)	12 (3rd)	12 (3rd)	17 (3rd)	22 (3rd)	24 (3rd)	29 (2nd)	Won	Lost	—N/a
Free State XV	0 (4th)	5 (3rd)	10 (2nd)	15 (1st)	19 (1st)	24 (1st)	29 (1st)	29 (1st)	29 (2nd)	29 (3rd)	Won	Lost	—N/a
Griffons	5 (1st)	6 (2nd)	7 (3rd)	7 (4th)	9 (4th)	9 (4th)	11 (4th)	11 (4th)	13 (4th)	15 (4th)	—N/a	—N/a	—N/a
Leopards	0 (5th)	0 (5th)	0 (5th)	1 (5th)	1 (5th)	2 (5th)	2 (5th)	3 (5th)	8 (5th)	8 (5th)	—N/a	—N/a	—N/a
Key:	win	draw	loss	bye									

=== Matches ===
==== Round One ====
21 April 2018	Griquas	50–33	Sharks XV	Tafel Lager Park, Kimberley
15:00	Try: AJ le Roux (2); Jono Janse van Rensburg; Louis Venter; Enver Brandt (3); Con: André Swarts (3); Pieter-Steyn de Wet (3); Pen: André Swarts	Scoreboard	Try: Grant Williams; Ilunga Mukendi (2); Jeremy Ward; Morné Joubert; Con: Garth April (3); Courtney Winnaar	Referee: Quinton Immelman

21 April 2018	Leopards	21–47	Griffons	Hoërskool Schweizer Reneke
15:00	Try: Eugene Hare; Gene Willemse; HP Swart; Con: DP de Lange; Schalk Hugo (2)	Scoreboard	Try: Warren Williams; Duan Pretorius (2); Arthur Williams; Jaun Kotzé; Jean Pretorius (2); Con: Jaun Kotzé (6)	Referee: Stephan Geldenhuys

Bye/s: Free State XV

==== Round Two ====
28 April 2018	Griquas	80–14	Leopards	Hoërskool Diamantveld, Kimberley
15:00	Try: AJ le Roux; Sias Koen (3); Conway Pretorius (2); André Swarts (2); Enver Brandt (3); Tythan Adams; Con: André Swarts (9); Eric Zana	Scoreboard	Try: HP Swart; Evardi Boshoff; Con: DP de Lange; Schalk Hugo	Referee: Ben Crouse

28 April 2018	Griffons	31–56	Free State XV	HT Pelatona Projects Stadium, Welkom
15:30	Try: Anrich Alberts (3); Joubert Engelbrecht (2); Con: Jaun Kotzé (3)	Scoreboard	Try: Günther Janse van Vuuren; Jasper Wiese; Ernst Stapelberg; Vuyani Maqina; Ali Mgijima; Tertius Kruger (3); Con: Ernst Stapelberg (5); Benhard Janse van Rensburg (3)	Referee: Jaco Pretorius

Bye/s: Sharks XV

==== Round Three ====
4 May 2018	Free State XV	40–20	Leopards	Shimla Park, Bloemfontein
18:00	Try: JP du Preez; Tertius Kruger; Marnus van der Merwe; Daniel Maartens; Aya Oliphant (2); Con: Ernst Stapelberg (5)	Scoreboard	Try: Tiaan Bezuidenhout; Boela Venter; Con: Schalk Hugo; DP de Lange; Pen: Schalk Hugo (2)	Referee: Paul Mente

5 May 2018	Sharks XV	33–22	Griffons	Kings Park Stadium, Durban
14:45	Try: Hyron Andrews; Garth April; Leolin Zas; Jeremy Ward; Grant Williams; Con: Garth April (3); Danrich Visagie	Scoreboard	Try: Anrich Alberts; Gavin Annandale; Neil Claassen; Cody Basson; Con: Jaun Kotzé	Referee: Ricus van der Hoven

Bye/s: Griquas

==== Round Four ====
13 May 2018	Griquas	31–32	Free State XV	Rustenburg Impala Rugby Club, Rustenburg
13:00	Try: Pieter Jansen van Vuren; Conway Pretorius; Enver Brandt; Kyle Steyn (2); Con: Pieter-Steyn de Wet (3)	Scoreboard	Try: Gerhard Olivier; Ernst Stapelberg; Tertius Kruger; JP Coetzee; Con: Ernst Stapelberg (3); Pen: Ernst Stapelberg (2)	Referee: AJ Jacobs

13 May 2018	Leopards	28–57	Sharks XV	Rustenburg Impala Rugby Club, Rustenburg
15:00	Try: Gideon van der Merwe; Gene Willemse; Bradley Moolman; Justin Newman; Con: Schalk Hugo (3); DP de Lange	Scoreboard	Try: Hyron Andrews; Kwanda Dimaza; Tera Mtembu; Grant Williams; Leolin Zas; Johan Deysel; Aphelele Fassi; Courtney Winnaar; Tristan Blewett; Con: Garth April (5); Danrich Visagie	Referee: Paul Mente

Bye/s: Griffons

==== Round Five ====
18 May 2018	Free State XV	12–10	Sharks XV	Toyota Stadium, Bloemfontein
18:00	Try: Reinach Venter; Tertius Kruger; Con: Ernst Stapelberg	Scoreboard	Try: Tera Mtembu; Con: Danrich Visagie; Pen: Danrich Visagie	Referee: AJ Jacobs

19 May 2018	Griquas	38–37	Griffons	Sivos Stadium, Kathu
15:00	Try: AJ Coertzen; Kyle Steyn (2); Christopher Bosch; Jono Janse van Rensburg; Con: Pieter-Steyn de Wet (3); André Swarts (2); Pen: André Swarts	Scoreboard	Try: Shirwin Cupido; Cody Basson (2); Neil Claassen; Rodney Damons (2); Vincent Maruping; Con: Jaun Kotzé	Referee: Ben Crouse

Bye/s: Leopards

==== Round Six ====
25 May 2018	Leopards	31–46	Griquas	Fanie du Toit Sport Ground, Potchefstroom
15:00	Try: Joe Smith; Louis van der Westhuizen; Evardi Boshoff; Justin Newman; Con: Schalk Hugo (4); Pen: Schalk Hugo	Scoreboard	Try: Christiaan Meyer; Enver Brandt (4); FP Pelser; Ederies Arendse; Con: André Swarts; George Whitehead (2); Ederies Arendse; Pen: André Swarts	Referee: Quinton Immelman

25 May 2018	Free State XV	33–19	Griffons	Toyota Stadium, Bloemfontein
18:00	Try: Erich de Jager; Niell Jordaan; Jasper Wiese; Ruan van Rensburg penalty try Con: Ernst Stapelberg (3)	Scoreboard	Try: Rodney Damons; Jaun Kotzé; Danie van der Merwe; Con: Jaun Kotzé (2)	Referee: Ruhan Meiring

Bye/s: Sharks XV

==== Round Seven ====
1 June 2018	Leopards	26–38	Free State XV	Fanie du Toit Sport Ground, Potchefstroom
15:00	Try: Stairs Mhlongo; Gene Willemse; Con: Schalk Hugo (2); Pen: Schalk Hugo (4)	Scoreboard	Try: Joseph Dweba; Günther Janse van Vuuren; Niell Jordaan; Ernst Stapelberg; Daniel Maartens; Zee Mkhabela; Con: Ernst Stapelberg; Benhard Janse van Rensburg (3)	Referee: Archie Sehlako

2 June 2018	Griffons	43–45	Sharks XV	HT Pelatona Projects Stadium, Welkom
15:00	Try: JP Mans; Cody Basson; Rodney Damons; Duan Pretorius; Jean Pretorius; Ezrick Alexander; Con: Jaun Kotzé (5); Pen: Jaun Kotzé	Scoreboard	Try: Tera Mtembu; Aphelele Fassi; Jeremy Ward; Tristan Blewett (2); Grant Williams; Con: Danrich Visagie (6); Pen: Danrich Visagie	Referee: Stephan Geldenhuys

Bye/s: Griquas

==== Round Eight ====
8 June 2018	Free State XV	19–27	Griquas	Toyota Stadium, Bloemfontein
18:00	Try: Niell Jordaan; Jasper Wiese; Sango Xamlashe; Con: Benhard Janse van Rensburg (2)	Scoreboard	Try: Pieter Jansen van Vuren; Christopher Bosch; Con: George Whitehead; Pen: George Whitehead (5)	Referee: Jaco Pretorius

9 June 2018	Sharks XV	52–24	Leopards	Piet Retief Rugby Club
17:00	Try: Khutha Mchunu; Tera Mtembu; Jeremy Ward; Aphelele Fassi (2); Andrew du Plessis; Leolin Zas; Con: Danrich Visagie (5); Aphelele Fassi (2); Pen: Danrich Visagie	Scoreboard	Try: Dane van der Westhuyzen; Chriswill September; Bradley Moolman; Frans Botha; Con: DP de Lange (2)	Referee: Ricus van der Hoven

Bye/s: Griffons

==== Round Nine ====
16 June 2018	Griffons	35–38	Leopards	HT Pelatona Projects Stadium, Welkom
15:00	Try: Anrich Alberts; Vincent Maruping; Jaun Kotzé; Duan Pretorius; Ezrick Alexander; Con: Jaun Kotzé (5)	Scoreboard	Try: Robert Hunt; Gideon van der Merwe; Schalk Hugo; Eugene Hare (2); Con: Schalk Hugo (5); Pen: Schalk Hugo	Referee: Ricus van der Hoven

17 June 2018	Sharks XV	34–38	Griquas	Sisa Dukashe Stadium, Mdantsane
13:00	Try: Jacques Vermeulen; Leolin Zas; Marius Louw; Jeremy Ward; Courtney Winnaar; Con: Garth April; Rhyno Smith (2); Pen: Rhyno Smith	Scoreboard	Try: Khwezi Mkhafu; Tythan Adams; Johnathan Francke; Godfrey Ramaboea; Luxolo Ntsepe; Con: George Whitehead (5); Pen: George Whitehead	Referee: AJ Jacobs

Bye/s: Free State XV

==== Round Ten ====
23 June 2018	Griffons	31–37	Griquas	HT Pelatona Projects Stadium, Welkom
15:30	Try: Barend Potgieter; Cody Basson; Danie van der Merwe; Joubert Engelbrecht; Con: Jaun Kotzé (3); Duan Pretorius; Pen: Jaun Kotzé	Scoreboard	Try: De Wet Kruger; Louis Venter (2); Godfrey Ramaboea; Con: George Whitehead (4); Pen: George Whitehead (3)	Referee: Archie Sehlako

23 June 2018	Sharks XV	48–21	Free State XV	Princess Magogo Stadium, KwaMashu
17:00	Try: Ross Geldenhuys; Wian Vosloo; Louis Schreuder (2); Marius Louw (2); Jeremy Ward; Con: Curwin Bosch (3); Garth April (2); Pen: Curwin Bosch	Scoreboard	Try: Marnus van der Merwe (2) penalty try Con: Lloyd Greeff; Benhard Janse van Rensburg	Referee: Rasta Rasivhenge

Bye/s: Leopards

== Southern Section ==
=== Log ===
2018 Rugby Challenge Southern Section log
Pos	Team	P	W	D	L	PF	PA	PD	TF	TA	TB	LB	Pts
1	Western Province	8	7	1	0	360	145	+215	55	20	7	0	37
2	Boland Cavaliers	8	4	1	3	234	192	+42	35	26	5	2	25
3	SWD Eagles	8	5	0	3	215	240	−25	28	36	4	0	24
4	Border Bulldogs	8	2	0	6	157	258	−101	22	38	2	1	11
5	Eastern Province Elephants	8	1	0	7	180	311	−131	25	45	4	2	10

- Western Province and the Boland Cavaliers qualified for the quarterfinals as section winners and runners-up respectively.

=== Round-by-round ===
The table below shows each team's progression throughout the season. For each round, each team's cumulative points total is shown with the overall log position in brackets.

Team Progression – Southern Section
Team	R1	R2	R3	R4	R5	R6	R7	R8	R9	R10	QF	SF	F
Western Province	5 (1st)	10 (1st)	14 (1st)	14 (1st)	19 (1st)	24 (1st)	29 (1st)	32 (1st)	32 (1st)	37 (1st)	Lost	—N/a	—N/a
Boland Cavaliers	5 (2nd)	5 (2nd)	6 (3rd)	11 (2nd)	16 (2nd)	16 (2nd)	16 (2nd)	19 (2nd)	21 (3rd)	25 (2nd)	Lost	—N/a	—N/a
SWD Eagles	0 (3rd)	5 (3rd)	10 (2nd)	10 (3rd)	10 (3rd)	10 (3rd)	15 (3rd)	19 (3rd)	24 (2nd)	24 (3rd)	—N/a	—N/a	—N/a
Border Bulldogs	0 (4th)	0 (4th)	0 (5th)	4 (4th)	4 (4th)	9 (4th)	10 (4th)	11 (4th)	11 (4th)	11 (4th)	—N/a	—N/a	—N/a
Eastern Province Elephants	0 (5th)	0 (5th)	0 (4th)	1 (5th)	3 (5th)	4 (5th)	5 (5th)	5 (5th)	10 (5th)	10 (5th)	—N/a	—N/a	—N/a
Key:	win	draw	loss	bye									

=== Matches ===
==== Round One ====
22 April 2018	Boland Cavaliers	51–24	Border Bulldogs	Wolfson Stadium, KwaZakele
13:00	Try: Clinton Theron; Zandré Jordaan; Edwin Sass; Charlie Mayeza (3); Sergio Torrens (2); Con: Elgar Watts (4); Pen: Elgar Watts	Scoreboard	Try: Billy Dutton; Athenkosi Manentsa (2); Con: Bangi Kobese (3); Pen: Bangi Kobese	Referee: Cwengile Jadezweni

22 April 2018	Eastern Province Elephants	12–59	Western Province	Wolfson Stadium, KwaZakele
15:00	Try: Alandré van Rooyen; Dries van Schalkwyk; Con: Henrique Olivier	Scoreboard	Try: Jean-Luc du Plessis (2); Tristan Leyds; Chad Solomon; Grant Hermanus (2); Duncan Saal (2); Michal Haznar; Con: Joshua Stander (5); Grant Hermanus (2)	Referee: Rasta Rasivhenge

Bye/s: SWD Eagles

==== Round Two ====
28 April 2018	Eastern Province Elephants	20–34	SWD Eagles	Nelson Mandela Bay Stadium, Port Elizabeth
12:15	Try: Alandré van Rooyen; Rowan Gouws; Dewald Barnard; Con: Henrique Olivier; Pen: Henrique Olivier	Scoreboard	Try: Jacques Vermaak; Marlo Weich; Leighton Eksteen; Tyler Fisher (2); Con: Divan Nel (2); Leighton Eksteen; Pen: Divan Nel	Referee: Quinton Immelman

28 April 2018	Border Bulldogs	7–36	Western Province	Buffalo City Stadium, East London
15:00	Try: penalty try	Scoreboard	Try: Johan du Toit; Joshua Stander; Duncan Saal (3); Labib Kannemeyer; Con: Joshua Stander (3)	Referee: Paul Mente

Bye/s: Boland Cavaliers

==== Round Three ====
4 May 2018	SWD Eagles	38–20	Border Bulldogs	Outeniqua Park, George
18:00	Try: Teunis Nieuwoudt; Janneman Stander; Tyler Fisher (2); Leighton Eksteen; Con: Divan Nel (5); Pen: Divan Nel	Scoreboard	Try: Soso Xakalashe; Sonwabiso Mqalo (2); Con: Bangi Kobese; Pen: Bangi Kobese	Referee: Quinton Immelman

5 May 2018	Western Province	23–21	Boland Cavaliers	Newlands Stadium, Cape Town
12:15	Try: Herschel Jantjies (2); Edwill van der Merwe; Con: Joshua Stander; Pen: Joshua Stander (2)	Scoreboard	Try: Ludio Williams; Jovelian de Koker; Valentino Wellman; Con: Elgar Watts (3)	Referee: Rasta Rasivhenge

Bye/s: Eastern Province Elephants

==== Round Four ====
11 May 2018	Border Bulldogs	22–17	Eastern Province Elephants	Buffalo City Stadium, East London
19:00	Try: Lelethu Gcilitshana; Sipho Nofemele (2); Con: Bangi Kobese (2); Pen: Bangi Kobese	Scoreboard	Try: JP Smith; Siyanda Grey; Con: Ruben de Vos (2); Drop: Ruben de Vos	Referee: Ruhan Meiring

12 May 2018	Boland Cavaliers	37–12	SWD Eagles	Wesbank Sports Grounds, Malmesbury
14:00	Try: Zandré Jordaan; Jovelian de Koker; Valentino Wellman; Edwin Sass (2); Sergio Torrens; Con: Elgar Watts (2); Pen: Jacquin Jansen	Scoreboard	Try: Marlou van Niekerk; Leighton Eksteen; Con: Leighton Eksteen	Referee: Jaco Pretorius

Bye/s: Western Province

==== Round Five ====
19 May 2018	Boland Cavaliers	40–37	Eastern Province Elephants	Montagu
15:00	Try: Rinus Bothma; Valentino Wellman (2); Kenan Cronjé; Rayno Benjamin; Charlie Mayeza; Con: Elgar Watts (4); Adriaan Carelse	Scoreboard	Try: Xandré Vos; Johan van Wyk; Brandon Brown; Zingisa April; Con: Ruben de Vos (4); Pen: Ruben de Vos (3)	Referee: Vusi Msibi

20 May 2018	SWD Eagles	3–50	Western Province	Bridgton Sports Grounds, Oudtshoorn
15:00	Pen: Leighton Eksteen	Scoreboard	Try: Jaco Coetzee; Justin Phillips; Joshua Stander; Duncan Saal; Craig Barry (2); Brenden Esterhuizen; Stephan de Wit; Con: Joshua Stander (5)	Referee: Quinton Immelman

Bye/s: Border Bulldogs

==== Round Six ====
25 May 2018	Border Bulldogs	29–14	Boland Cavaliers	Buffalo City Stadium, East London
19:00	Try: Somila Mantyoyi; Sipho Nofemele; Sino Nyoka; Somila Jho; Con: Bangi Kobese (3); Drop: Aphiwe Stemele	Scoreboard	Try: Francois Esterhuyzen; Jacquin Jansen; Con: Elgar Watts (2)	Referee: Ben Crouse

26 May 2018	Eastern Province Elephants	28–75	Western Province	Kemsley Park
14:00	Try: Brandon Brown; JP Smith; Ruben de Vos; Dewald Barnard; Con: Ruben de Vos (4)	Scoreboard	Try: Johan du Toit; Chris Massyn; Luke Stringer; Daniël du Plessis (2); Tristan Leyds; Chad Solomon; Stephan de Wit; Grant Hermanus; Edwill van der Merwe; Duncan Saal; Con: Joshua Stander (6); Tristan Leyds (4)	Referee: Paul Mente

Bye/s: SWD Eagles

==== Round Seven ====
2 June 2018	SWD Eagles	47–28	Eastern Province Elephants	Rosemore Stadium, George
15:00	Try: Ruben Schoeman; Johan Steyn; Alshaun Bock; Marlou van Niekerk; Tyler Fisher; Leighton Eksteen; Janneman Stander; Con: Leighton Eksteen (6)	Scoreboard	Try: Josh Kota; Nkululeko Marwana; Riaan Arends; Quinton Haasbroek; Con: Ruben de Vos (4)	Referee: Cwengile Jadezweni

2 June 2018	Western Province	52–24	Border Bulldogs	False Bay RFC
15:00	Try: Jaco Coetzee; Justin Phillips; Daniël du Plessis; Duncan Saal (2); Craig Barry; Herschel Jantjies; Cornel Smit; Con: Tristan Leyds (5); Tiaan Swanepoel	Scoreboard	Try: Maliviwe Simanga; Somila Jho; Foxy Ntleki; Lukhanyo Nomzanga; Con: Aphiwe Stemele (2)	Referee: Quinton Immelman

Bye/s: Boland Cavaliers

==== Round Eight ====
8 June 2018	Border Bulldogs	17–24	SWD Eagles	Buffalo City Stadium, East London
19:00	Try: Somila Jho; Sipho Nofemele; Con: Aphiwe Stemele; Mbembe Payi; Pen: Aphiwe Stemele	Scoreboard	Try: Johan Steyn; Adri Jacobs; Marlou van Niekerk; Con: Leighton Eksteen (3); Pen: Leighton Eksteen	Referee: Paul Mente

9 June 2018	Boland Cavaliers	24–24	Western Province	Esselen Park Stadium
14:15	Try: Elgar Watts; Charlie Mayeza; Sergio Torrens (2); Con: Elgar Watts (2)	Scoreboard	Try: Edwill van der Merwe; Daniël du Plessis; Juarno Augustus (2); Con: Joshua Stander (2)	Referee: AJ Jacobs

Bye/s: Eastern Province Elephants

==== Round Nine ====
15 June 2018	SWD Eagles	31–27	Boland Cavaliers	Outeniqua Park, George
18:00	Try: Adri Jacobs; Tyler Fisher; Alshaun Bock; Leighton Eksteen; Con: Leighton Eksteen (4); Pen: Leighton Eksteen	Scoreboard	Try: Charlie Mayeza; Kenan Cronjé; Clinton Theron; Sergio Torrens; Con: Elgar Watts (2); Pen: Elgar Watts	Referee: Paul Mente

17 June 2018	Border Bulldogs	14–26	Eastern Province Elephants	Sisa Dukashe Stadium, Mdantsane
15:00	Try: Johannes Janse van Rensburg; Athenkosi Manentsa; Con: Mbembe Payi; Bangi Kobese	Scoreboard	Try: Xandré Vos; Riaan Arends; Anele Lungisa; Michael Botha; Con: Michael Botha; Ruben de Vos (2)	Referee: Archie Sehlako

Bye/s: Western Province

==== Round Ten ====
22 June 2018	Western Province	41–26	SWD Eagles	Brookside, Cape Town
15:00	Try: Juarno Augustus; Joshua Stander; Daniël du Plessis; Dean Muir; EW Viljoen penalty try Con: Joshua Stander (3); Pen: Joshua Stander	Scoreboard	Try: Nicolaas Immelman; Johan Steyn; Con: Leighton Eksteen (2); Pen: Leighton Eksteen (4)	Referee: Cwengile Jadezweni

23 June 2018	Eastern Province Elephants	12–20	Boland Cavaliers	WJ de Wet Stadium, Despatch
15:00	Try: Josh Kota; Brandon Brown; Con: Simon Bolze	Scoreboard	Try: Arnout Malherbe; Ludio Williams; Con: Elgar Watts (2); Pen: Elgar Watts (2)	Referee: Ben Crouse

Bye/s: Border Bulldogs

== Title play-offs ==
The final pool standings and title play-offs seeding were:

Section winners
Seeding	Team	Section	PD	Pts
1	Pumas	Northern Section	39	+256
2	Western Province	Southern Section	37	+213
3	Griquas	Central Section	36	+116
Section runners-up
Seeding	Team	Section	PD	Pts
4	Sharks XV	Central Section	29	+74
5	Golden Lions XV	Northern Section	28	+154
6	Boland Cavaliers	Southern Section	25	+42
Section third-placed teams
Seeding	Team	Section	PD	Pts
7	Free State XV	Central Section	29	+39
8	Blue Bulls XV	Northern Section	27	+62
9	SWD Eagles	Southern Section	24	−23

=== Quarterfinals ===
30 June 2018	Pumas	30–24	Blue Bulls XV	Mbombela Stadium, Mbombela
12:30	Try: Marné Coetzee; Jeandré Rudolph; Frank Herne; Con: Chris Smith (2); Justin van Staden; Pen: Chris Smith (3)	Scoreboard	Try: Dewald Maritz; Xolisa Guma (2); Earll Douwrie; Con: Tinus de Beer; Earll Douwrie	Referee: Quinton Immelman

30 June 2018	Griquas	51–22	Boland Cavaliers	Tafel Lager Park, Kimberley
14:00	Try: Conway Pretorius; Kyle Steyn; Ederies Arendse; AJ Coertzen (2); De Wet Kruger; Con: George Whitehead (4); André Swarts (2); Pen: George Whitehead (3)	Scoreboard	Try: Rinus Bothma; Edwin Sass; Charlie Mayeza; Con: Elgar Watts (2); Pen: Elgar Watts	Referee: Stephan Geldenhuys

30 June 2018	Sharks XV	55–12	Golden Lions XV	Jonsson Kings Park, Durban
14:15	Try: Tera Mtembu; Grant Williams; Garth April (2); Courtney Winnaar (2); Tristan Blewett; Con: Garth April (6); Danrich Visagie; Pen: Garth April (2)	Scoreboard	Try: James Venter; Wandisile Simelane; Con: Shaun Reynolds	Referee: Paul Mente

1 July 2018	Western Province	20–26	Free State XV	Green Point Track, Cape Town
14:30	Try: Tristan Leyds; David Brits; Con: Grant Hermanus (2); Pen: Grant Hermanus (2)	Scoreboard	Try: Jasper Wiese; Carel-Jan Coetzee (2); Benhard Janse van Rensburg; Con: Benhard Janse van Rensburg (3)	Referee: Ben Crouse

=== Semifinals ===
6 July 2018	Pumas	30–17	Sharks XV	Mbombela Stadium, Mbombela
19:00	Try: Stefan Ungerer; Ruwellyn Isbell; De-Jay Terblanche; Con: Chris Smith (3); Pen: Chris Smith (3)	Scoreboard	Try: Gideon Koegelenberg; Kwanda Dimaza; Con: Garth April; Danrich Visagie; Pen: Garth April	Referee: AJ Jacobs

8 July 2018	Griquas	27–14	Free State XV	Tafel Lager Park, Kimberley
15:00	Try: Khwezi Mkhafu; Pieter Jansen van Vuren; Kyle Steyn; Con: George Whitehead (3); Pen: George Whitehead (2)	Scoreboard	Try: Jasper Wiese; Carel-Jan Coetzee; Con: Ernst Stapelberg (2)	Referee: Cwengile Jadezweni

=== Final ===
15 July 2018	Pumas	32–30	Griquas	Bridgton Sports Grounds, Oudtshoorn
14:30	Try: Marko Janse van Rensburg (2); Stefan Willemse; Morné Joubert; Con: Chris Smith (3); Pen: Chris Smith; Drop: Justin van Staden	Scoreboard	Try: Kyle Steyn; Johnathan Francke; AJ Coertzen; Con: George Whitehead (3); Pen: George Whitehead (3)	Referee: Quinton Immelman

== Honours ==
The honour roll for the 2018 Rugby Challenge was as follows:

2018 Rugby Challenge
Champions:	Pumas (1st title)
Top points scorer:	Chris Smith, Pumas (131)
Top try scorer:	Enver Brandt, Griquas (11)

== Players ==
=== Squads ===
The following squads were named for the 2018 Rugby Challenge:

Blue Bulls XV
Name	PMA	WEL	GFA	LIO	PMA	WEL	GFA	LIO	PMA	SF	F	App	Try	Con	Pen	DG	Pts
Matthys Basson	1	1	1			17 (substituted on)	1			—N/a	—N/a	5	2	0	0	0	10
Edgar Marutlulle	2		2		2	16	16 (substituted on)	16 (substituted on)		—N/a	—N/a	5	1	0	0	0	5
John-Roy Jenkinson	3		3							—N/a	—N/a	2	0	0	0	0	0
Ruben van Heerden	4	4	4			4	4	18 (substituted on)	4	—N/a	—N/a	7	2	0	0	0	10
Aston Fortuin	5	5	5		5	5	5			—N/a	—N/a	6	0	0	0	0	0
Adré Smith	6	7			18 (substituted on)					—N/a	—N/a	3	0	0	0	0	0
Hendré Stassen	7		7							—N/a	—N/a	2	0	0	0	0	0
Abongile Nonkontwana	8	8	8	7	7		19 (substituted on)		7	—N/a	—N/a	7	0	0	0	0	0
Embrose Papier	9		9		9					—N/a	—N/a	3	3	0	0	0	15
Francois Brummer	10		10	10	10					—N/a	—N/a	4	0	2	0	0	4
Andell Loubser	11	11		22 (substituted on)	22 (substituted on)	15	14		11	—N/a	—N/a	7	2	6	0	0	22
JT Jackson	12	12	12		12	12	12	12	12	—N/a	—N/a	8	3	0	0	0	15
Ulrich Beyers	13		13	13					22 (substituted on)	—N/a	—N/a	4	3	0	0	0	15
Xolisa Guma	14		11			14			14	—N/a	—N/a	4	6	0	0	0	30
Earll Douwrie	15	15	15	15	15		15		15	—N/a	—N/a	7	4	22	5	0	79
Corniel Els	16 (substituted on)	2	16 (substituted on)	2					16 (substituted on)	—N/a	—N/a	5	2	0	0	0	10
Nqoba Mxoli	17 (substituted on)	17 (substituted on)				1	17 (substituted on)			—N/a	—N/a	4	2	0	0	0	10
Marius Verwey	18 (substituted on)	18 (substituted on)	18 (substituted on)	4	4	18	18 (substituted on)		18 (substituted on)	—N/a	—N/a	7	1	0	0	0	5
Tim Agaba	19 (substituted on)									—N/a	—N/a	1	0	0	0	0	0
Lian du Toit	20 (substituted on)	20 (substituted on)	20	9		9	20 (substituted on)	20 (substituted on)		—N/a	—N/a	6	1	0	0	0	5
Boeta Hamman	21 (substituted on)	10								—N/a	—N/a	2	0	0	0	0	0
Erich Cronjé	22 (substituted on)	13								—N/a	—N/a	2	0	0	0	0	0
Madot Mabokela		3	17 (substituted on)	3	3					—N/a	—N/a	4	0	0	0	0	0
Shaun Adendorff		6	19 (substituted on)	19 (substituted on)						—N/a	—N/a	3	0	0	0	0	0
André Warner		9					9	9		—N/a	—N/a	3	1	0	0	0	5
Duncan Matthews		14	14	14	14					—N/a	—N/a	4	3	0	0	0	15
Jan-Henning Campher		16 (substituted on)								—N/a	—N/a	1	1	0	0	0	5
Khwezi Mafu		19 (substituted on)								—N/a	—N/a	1	0	0	0	0	0
Tony Jantjies		21 (substituted on)	21 (substituted on)		21 (substituted on)	10	10			—N/a	—N/a	5	0	0	0	0	0
Jerome Bossr		22 (substituted on)								—N/a	—N/a	1	0	0	0	0	0
Boom Prinsloo			6	6	6	6	6		6	—N/a	—N/a	6	1	0	0	0	5
Marnus Potgieter			22 (substituted on)			22				—N/a	—N/a	1	0	0	0	0	0
Simphiwe Matanzima				1						—N/a	—N/a	1	0	0	0	0	0
Eli Snyman				5						—N/a	—N/a	1	0	0	0	0	0
Jano Venter				8	8	8	8		8	—N/a	—N/a	5	1	0	0	0	5
Jamba Ulengo				11	11	11	11	11		—N/a	—N/a	5	3	0	0	0	15
Dries Swanepoel				12	13		13			—N/a	—N/a	3	0	0	0	0	0
Johan Grobbelaar				16 (substituted on)	16 (substituted on)	2	2		2	—N/a	—N/a	5	3	0	0	0	15
Mornay Smith				17 (substituted on)	17 (substituted on)	3		17 (substituted on)		—N/a	—N/a	4	0	0	0	0	0
Ig Prinsloo				18 (substituted on)					3	—N/a	—N/a	2	0	0	0	0	0
Theo Maree				20 (substituted on)	20 (substituted on)				9	—N/a	—N/a	3	0	0	0	0	0
Theo Boshoff				21		21	21 (substituted on)	21 (substituted on)		—N/a	—N/a	2	0	0	0	0	0
Cabous Eloff					1					—N/a	—N/a	1	0	0	0	0	0
Jaco Bezuidenhout					19 (substituted on)					—N/a	—N/a	1	1	0	0	0	5
Ewart Potgieter						7				—N/a	—N/a	1	0	0	0	0	0
Franco Naudé						13	22 (substituted on)	22 (substituted on)	13	—N/a	—N/a	4	2	0	0	0	10
Denzel Hill						19	7			—N/a	—N/a	1	0	0	0	0	0
Josh Allderman						20			20 (substituted on)	—N/a	—N/a	1	0	0	0	0	0
Conraad van Vuuren							3	3		—N/a	—N/a	2	0	0	0	0	0
Pierre Schoeman								1		—N/a	—N/a	1	0	0	0	0	0
Jaco Visagie								2		—N/a	—N/a	1	0	0	0	0	0
Jannes Kirsten								4		—N/a	—N/a	1	0	0	0	0	0
Jason Jenkins								5		—N/a	—N/a	1	1	0	0	0	5
Marco van Staden								6		—N/a	—N/a	1	0	0	0	0	0
Thembelani Bholi								7		—N/a	—N/a	1	0	0	0	0	0
Hanro Liebenberg								8		—N/a	—N/a	1	1	0	0	0	5
Manie Libbok								10		—N/a	—N/a	1	0	3	1	0	9
Burger Odendaal								13		—N/a	—N/a	1	0	0	0	0	0
Johnny Kôtze								14		—N/a	—N/a	1	0	0	0	0	0
Divan Rossouw								15		—N/a	—N/a	1	0	0	0	0	0
Nick de Jager								19 (substituted on)		—N/a	—N/a	1	0	0	0	0	0
Dewald Maritz									1	—N/a	—N/a	1	1	0	0	0	5
Ruan Nortjé									5	—N/a	—N/a	1	0	0	0	0	0
Tinus de Beer									10	—N/a	—N/a	1	0	1	0	0	2
Dayan van der Westhuizen									17 (substituted on)	—N/a	—N/a	1	0	0	0	0	0
Paul Schoeman									19 (substituted on)	—N/a	—N/a	1	0	0	0	0	0
Garrick Mattheus									21 (substituted on)	—N/a	—N/a	1	0	0	0	0	0
Total												9	51	34	6	0	341
Irvin Ali, Heino Bezuidenhout, Marnitz Boshoff, Ewan Coetzee, Werner Fourie, Stedman Gans, Richman Gora, Cameron Hufke, Rieckert Korff, Eduan Lubbe, Jay-Cee Nel, Reagan Oranje, Ryno Pieterse, Hanru Sirgel, Ginter Smuts, Gerhard Steenekamp, Jade Stighling and Dylan van der Walt were named in the squad, but not included in a matchday squad. Replacements used in match against Welwitschias not known.

Boland Cavaliers
Name	BDR	WPr	SWD	EPE	BDR	WPr	SWD	EPE	GRQ	SF	F	App	Try	Con	Pen	DG	Pts
Clinton Theron	1	3	3	3	18 (substituted on)	3	3	17 (substituted on)	17 (substituted on)	—N/a	—N/a	9	2	0	0	0	10
Clemen Lewis	2	2	16 (substituted on)		16 (substituted on)	2	2	2	2	—N/a	—N/a	8	0	0	0	0	0
Stefaan Grundlingh	3	18 (substituted on)	18 (substituted on)	18 (substituted on)	3	17 (substituted on)	17 (substituted on)	3	3	—N/a	—N/a	9	0	0	0	0	0
Marlyn Williams	4	4	4	4	4	4	4	4	4	—N/a	—N/a	9	0	0	0	0	0
Rinus Bothma	5	5	5	5	5	5	5		5	—N/a	—N/a	8	2	0	0	0	10
Tapiwa Tsomondo	6	6	6	6	6	6	6	6	6	—N/a	—N/a	9	0	0	0	0	0
Ludio Williams	7	7	7			7	7	8	7	—N/a	—N/a	7	2	0	0	0	10
Zandré Jordaan	8	8	8	8	8	8	8		8	—N/a	—N/a	8	2	0	0	0	10
Jovelian de Koker	9	9	9	9	9	9	9	9	9	—N/a	—N/a	9	2	0	0	0	10
Elgar Watts	10	22 (substituted on)	10	10	10	10	10	10	10	—N/a	—N/a	9	1	23	5	0	66
Valentino Wellman	11	11	11	11	11	21 (substituted on)	21 (substituted on)	11	21 (substituted on)	—N/a	—N/a	9	4	0	0	0	20
Edwin Sass	12	12	12	12	12	12	12		12	—N/a	—N/a	8	4	0	0	0	20
Rayno Benjamin	13	13	21 (substituted on)	20 (substituted on)						—N/a	—N/a	4	1	0	0	0	5
Charlie Mayeza	14	14		14	14	14	14	14	14	—N/a	—N/a	8	7	0	0	0	35
Jacquin Jansen	15	15	15		15			15		—N/a	—N/a	5	1	0	1	0	8
Francois Esterhuyzen	16 (substituted on)	16 (substituted on)	2	2	2	16 (substituted on)	16 (substituted on)	16 (substituted on)	16 (substituted on)	—N/a	—N/a	9	1	0	0	0	5
Kyle Kruger	17 (substituted on)	1	1	17 (substituted on)	17 (substituted on)			18 (substituted on)		—N/a	—N/a	6	0	0	0	0	0
Mac Muller	18						18 (substituted on)	19 (substituted on)	19 (substituted on)	—N/a	—N/a	3	0	0	0	0	0
Kenan Cronjé	19 (substituted on)	19 (substituted on)	19 (substituted on)	7	7	19 (substituted on)	19 (substituted on)	7	18 (substituted on)	—N/a	—N/a	9	2	0	0	0	10
Adriaan Carelse	20 (substituted on)	10	22 (substituted on)	21 (substituted on)	21 (substituted on)	15	15	22 (substituted on)	15	—N/a	—N/a	9	0	1	0	0	2
Gerrit van Wyk	21 (substituted on)	21 (substituted on)	13	13	13	13	13	13	13	—N/a	—N/a	9	0	0	0	0	0
Sergio Torrens	22 (substituted on)	20 (substituted on)	14	15	22	11	11		11	—N/a	—N/a	7	6	0	0	0	30
Arnout Malherbe		17 (substituted on)	17 (substituted on)	1	1	1	1	1	1	—N/a	—N/a	8	1	0	0	0	5
Emile Booysen			20 (substituted on)	19 (substituted on)						—N/a	—N/a	2	0	0	0	0	0
Erich Kankowski				16 (substituted on)				20 (substituted on)		—N/a	—N/a	2	0	0	0	0	0
Juandre Joseph				22 (substituted on)						—N/a	—N/a	1	0	0	0	0	0
Brandon Valentyn					19 (substituted on)	18 (substituted on)		5		—N/a	—N/a	3	0	0	0	0	0
Thor Halvorsen					20 (substituted on)					—N/a	—N/a	1	0	0	0	0	0
Jaywinn Juries						20 (substituted on)	20 (substituted on)	21 (substituted on)	20 (substituted on)	—N/a	—N/a	4	0	0	0	0	0
Andries Viljoen						22 (substituted on)	22 (substituted on)	12	22 (substituted on)	—N/a	—N/a	4	0	0	0	0	0
Total												9	38	24	6	0	256
Gareth Cilliers, JR Hofmeester, Phillip Jacobs, Claude Johannes and Rowan Ranna were named in the squad, but not included in a matchday squad.

Border Bulldogs
Name	BOL	WPr	SWD	EPE	BOL	WPr	SWD	EPE	QF	SF	F	App	Try	Con	Pen	DG	Pts
Blake Kyd	1	3	17 (substituted on)	1	1	1	1	1	—N/a	—N/a	—N/a	8	0	0	0	0	0
Mihlali Mpafi	2	2	2	2	2	16	2	2	—N/a	—N/a	—N/a	7	0	0	0	0	0
Lwando Mabenge	3		3	3	3	3	3	3	—N/a	—N/a	—N/a	7	0	0	0	0	0
Hendri Storm	4	4	19 (substituted on)	4	4	4	4	4	—N/a	—N/a	—N/a	8	0	0	0	0	0
Johannes Janse van Rensburg	5	5	5	5	5	5	5	5	—N/a	—N/a	—N/a	8	1	0	0	0	5
Lukhanyo Nomzanga	6	6	6			21 (substituted on)	6		—N/a	—N/a	—N/a	5	1	0	0	0	5
Billy Dutton	7	7	7	7	7	7	8	7	—N/a	—N/a	—N/a	8	1	0	0	0	5
Athenkosi Manentsa	8	8			8	8		8	—N/a	—N/a	—N/a	5	3	0	0	0	15
Bangi Kobese	9	20 (substituted on)	9	9	9	9	20 (substituted on)	20 (substituted on)	—N/a	—N/a	—N/a	8	0	10	3	0	29
Sino Nyoka	10	9	10	10	21 (substituted on)	20 (substituted on)	9	9	—N/a	—N/a	—N/a	8	1	0	0	0	5
Lelethu Gcilitshana	11	11	11	11	11				—N/a	—N/a	—N/a	5	1	0	0	0	5
Sethu Tom	12	12	12	12					—N/a	—N/a	—N/a	4	0	0	0	0	0
Foxy Ntleki	13	13	13	13	13	13	13	22 (substituted on)	—N/a	—N/a	—N/a	8	1	0	0	0	5
Sipho Nofemele	14	14	14	14	14	14	14	14	—N/a	—N/a	—N/a	8	4	0	0	0	20
Sonwabiso Mqalo	15	15	15	15	15				—N/a	—N/a	—N/a	5	2	0	0	0	10
Maliviwe Simanga	16 (substituted on)	16 (substituted on)	16 (substituted on)	16 (substituted on)	16 (substituted on)	2	16 (substituted on)	16 (substituted on)	—N/a	—N/a	—N/a	8	1	0	0	0	5
Yanga Xakalashe	17 (substituted on)	17 (substituted on)			17 (substituted on)	17 (substituted on)			—N/a	—N/a	—N/a	4	0	0	0	0	0
Ayabonga Nomboyo	18 (substituted on)	18 (substituted on)	4						—N/a	—N/a	—N/a	3	0	0	0	0	0
Athenkosi Khethani	19 (substituted on)			18 (substituted on)	19 (substituted on)	19 (substituted on)	18 (substituted on)	18 (substituted on)	—N/a	—N/a	—N/a	6	0	0	0	0	0
Soso Xakalashe	20 (substituted on)		8	8					—N/a	—N/a	—N/a	3	1	0	0	0	5
Mbembe Payi	21 (substituted on)					15	15	15	—N/a	—N/a	—N/a	4	0	2	0	0	4
Somila Jho	22 (substituted on)	22 (substituted on)	22 (substituted on)	22 (substituted on)	22 (substituted on)	11	11	13	—N/a	—N/a	—N/a	8	3	0	0	0	15
Siyamthanda Ngande		1	1	17 (substituted on)	18 (substituted on)	18 (substituted on)	17 (substituted on)	17 (substituted on)	—N/a	—N/a	—N/a	7	0	0	0	0	0
Aphiwe Stemele		10	21 (substituted on)	20	10	10	10	10	—N/a	—N/a	—N/a	6	0	3	1	1	12
Lubabalo Lento		19 (substituted on)						19 (substituted on)	—N/a	—N/a	—N/a	2	0	0	0	0	0
Somila Mantyoyi		21 (substituted on)		21 (substituted on)	12	12	12	12	—N/a	—N/a	—N/a	6	1	0	0	0	5
Qhama Hina			18 (substituted on)						—N/a	—N/a	—N/a	1	0	0	0	0	0
Onke Dubase			20 (substituted on)	6	6	6	7		—N/a	—N/a	—N/a	5	0	0	0	0	0
Nkosi Nofuma				19 (substituted on)	20 (substituted on)		19 (substituted on)	6	—N/a	—N/a	—N/a	4	0	0	0	0	0
Mihlali Nchukana						22 (substituted on)	21 (substituted on)	21 (substituted on)	—N/a	—N/a	—N/a	3	0	0	0	0	0
Sibongile Novuka							22 (substituted on)		—N/a	—N/a	—N/a	1	0	0	0	0	0
Carlisle Jordan								11	—N/a	—N/a	—N/a	1	0	0	0	0	0
penalty try												–	1	–	–	–	7
Total												8	22	15	4	1	157
Lunga Dumezweni and Siya Ncanywa were named in the squad, but not included in a matchday squad.

Eastern Province Elephants
Name	WPr	SWD	BDR	BOL	WPr	SWD	BDR	BOL	QF	SF	F	App	Try	Con	Pen	DG	Pts
Xandré Vos	1	1	17 (substituted on)	1	1	1	1	1	—N/a	—N/a	—N/a	8	2	0	0	0	10
Alandré van Rooyen	2	2							—N/a	—N/a	—N/a	2	2	0	0	0	10
Entienne Swanepoel	3								—N/a	—N/a	—N/a	1	0	0	0	0	0
Giant Mtyanda	4								—N/a	—N/a	—N/a	1	0	0	0	0	0
Dries van Schalkwyk	5								—N/a	—N/a	—N/a	1	1	0	0	0	5
Eital Bredenkamp	6								—N/a	—N/a	—N/a	1	0	0	0	0	0
Jurie van Vuuren	7								—N/a	—N/a	—N/a	1	0	0	0	0	0
Freddy Ngoza	8	8							—N/a	—N/a	—N/a	2	0	0	0	0	0
Freddie Muller	9	20 (substituted on)	21 (substituted on)	21 (substituted on)	20 (substituted on)	9			—N/a	—N/a	—N/a	6	0	0	0	0	0
Henrique Olivier	10	10	22 (substituted on)	22 (substituted on)					—N/a	—N/a	—N/a	4	0	2	1	0	7
Sphu Msutwana	11	11	11		11		11	11	—N/a	—N/a	—N/a	6	0	0	0	0	0
Andile Jho	12								—N/a	—N/a	—N/a	1	0	0	0	0	0
Siyanda Grey	13	13	13	13	13	13	13	13	—N/a	—N/a	—N/a	8	1	0	0	0	5
Riaan Arends	14	14	14	14	15	14	14	14	—N/a	—N/a	—N/a	8	2	0	0	0	10
Keanu Vers	15	15	15	15					—N/a	—N/a	—N/a	4	0	0	0	0	0
Josh Kota	16 (substituted on)	16 (substituted on)	2	2	2	2	2	2	—N/a	—N/a	—N/a	8	2	0	0	0	10
Johan van Wyk	17 (substituted on)	3	3	3	3				—N/a	—N/a	—N/a	5	1	0	0	0	5
Wynand Grassmann	18 (substituted on)	4	4	4	7	7	5	4	—N/a	—N/a	—N/a	8	0	0	0	0	0
Siya Mdaka	19 (substituted on)	7	8	8	8	8	8	7	—N/a	—N/a	—N/a	8	0	0	0	0	0
JP Smith	20 (substituted on)		9	9	9		9	9	—N/a	—N/a	—N/a	6	2	1	0	0	12
Ruben de Vos	21 (substituted on)	21 (substituted on)	10	10	10	10	10	10	—N/a	—N/a	—N/a	8	1	16	3	1	49
Nkululeko Marwana	22 (substituted on)	12	12	12	12	12	12	12	—N/a	—N/a	—N/a	8	1	0	0	0	5
Anele Lungisa		5	5	5	5	5	19 (substituted on)	5	—N/a	—N/a	—N/a	7	1	0	0	0	5
Brandon Brown		6	6	6	6	6	6	6	—N/a	—N/a	—N/a	7	3	0	0	0	15
Rowan Gouws		9							—N/a	—N/a	—N/a	1	1	0	0	0	5
Dewald Barnard		17 (substituted on)	1	18 (substituted on)	17 (substituted on)	17 (substituted on)	17 (substituted on)		—N/a	—N/a	—N/a	6	2	0	0	0	10
Nick Roebeck		18 (substituted on)	18 (substituted on)			3	18 (substituted on)	18 (substituted on)	—N/a	—N/a	—N/a	5	0	0	0	0	0
Zingisa April		19 (substituted on)	7	7		20 (substituted on)	7	20 (substituted on)	—N/a	—N/a	—N/a	6	1	0	0	0	5
Tiaan Stander		22 (substituted on)							—N/a	—N/a	—N/a	1	0	0	0	0	0
JP Jamieson			16 (substituted on)	16 (substituted on)	16 (substituted on)		16 (substituted on)	16 (substituted on)	—N/a	—N/a	—N/a	5	0	0	0	0	0
Mncedisi Dlwengu			19 (substituted on)	19 (substituted on)	4	4	4	19 (substituted on)	—N/a	—N/a	—N/a	6	0	0	0	0	0
Quinton Haasbroek			20 (substituted on)	20 (substituted on)	19 (substituted on)	19 (substituted on)			—N/a	—N/a	—N/a	4	1	0	0	0	5
Monwabisi Mkhwakhwi				11	14	11			—N/a	—N/a	—N/a	3	0	0	0	0	0
Lupumlo Mguca				17 (substituted on)	18 (substituted on)		3	3	—N/a	—N/a	—N/a	4	0	0	0	0	0
Simon Bolze					21 (substituted on)	22 (substituted on)	22 (substituted on)	22 (substituted on)	—N/a	—N/a	—N/a	4	0	1	0	0	2
Cheswin van Wyk					22 (substituted on)				—N/a	—N/a	—N/a	1	0	0	0	0	0
Michael Botha						15	15	15	—N/a	—N/a	—N/a	3	1	0	0	0	5
Justin Antonie						16 (substituted on)			—N/a	—N/a	—N/a	1	0	0	0	0	0
Luzuko Nyabaza						18 (substituted on)		17 (substituted on)	—N/a	—N/a	—N/a	2	0	0	0	0	0
Sonwabo Majola						21 (substituted on)	21 (substituted on)	21 (substituted on)	—N/a	—N/a	—N/a	3	0	0	0	0	0
Lusanda Badiyana							20 (substituted on)	8	—N/a	—N/a	—N/a	2	0	0	0	0	0
Total												8	25	20	4	1	180
Loyola Dapula, Luciano Grootboom, Hannes Huisamen, Unathi Kongwana, Dumisani Meslane, Rouche Nel, Masixole Screech, Josiah Twum-Boafo and Madoda Yako were named in the squad, but not included in a matchday squad.

Falcons
Name	WEL	BUL	LIO	PMA	WEL	BUL	LIO	PMA	QF	SF	F	App	Try	Con	Pen	DG	Pts
Koos Strauss	1			1	1	1	1	1	—N/a	—N/a	—N/a	6	0	0	0	0	0
Marco Klopper	2	2	2	2	16 (substituted on)	2	2		—N/a	—N/a	—N/a	7	2	0	0	0	10
Gihard Visagie	3	17 (substituted on)	3	3	17 (substituted on)			17 (substituted on)	—N/a	—N/a	—N/a	6	0	0	0	0	0
Shane Kirkwood	4	4	4	4	4	4	4	4	—N/a	—N/a	—N/a	8	0	0	0	0	0
Jacques Alberts	5	5	5	5	18 (substituted on)	5	5		—N/a	—N/a	—N/a	7	2	0	0	0	10
Martin Sithole	6	6		19 (substituted on)	19 (substituted on)	19 (substituted on)	19 (substituted on)	6	—N/a	—N/a	—N/a	7	2	0	0	0	10
Ernst Ladendorf	7	7		7	7	18 (substituted on)	18 (substituted on)	7	—N/a	—N/a	—N/a	7	0	0	0	0	0
Friedle Olivier	8	8	19 (substituted on)	18 (substituted on)		8	8	18 (substituted on)	—N/a	—N/a	—N/a	7	2	0	0	0	10
André du Plessis	9	9		20 (substituted on)	20 (substituted on)	9	9		—N/a	—N/a	—N/a	6	2	12	4	0	46
Errol Jaggers	10	10	10	10	10	10	10	10	—N/a	—N/a	—N/a	8	0	4	1	0	11
Etienne Taljaard	11	11	11			13	11	11	—N/a	—N/a	—N/a	6	4	0	0	0	20
Andrew van Wyk	12			12	12				—N/a	—N/a	—N/a	3	1	1	0	0	7
Lundi Ralarala	13	13	13	13	13		13	13	—N/a	—N/a	—N/a	7	2	0	0	0	10
Don Mlondobozi	14			14	14	14			—N/a	—N/a	—N/a	4	1	0	0	0	5
Andries Truter	15	15	22 (substituted on)		22 (substituted on)	15	15	15	—N/a	—N/a	—N/a	7	2	0	0	0	10
Jan Enslin	16 (substituted on)	16 (substituted on)	16 (substituted on)	16 (substituted on)	2	16 (substituted on)	16 (substituted on)	2	—N/a	—N/a	—N/a	8	1	0	0	0	5
Andries Schutte	17 (substituted on)	3	1	17 (substituted on)	3	3	3		—N/a	—N/a	—N/a	7	1	0	0	0	5
Andrew Volschenk	18 (substituted on)		18 (substituted on)		5			5	—N/a	—N/a	—N/a	4	1	0	0	0	5
Robey Leibrandt	19 (substituted on)		7			7	7		—N/a	—N/a	—N/a	4	1	0	0	0	5
Anrich Richter	20 (substituted on)	20 (substituted on)	9	9	9	20 (substituted on)		9	—N/a	—N/a	—N/a	7	1	2	1	0	12
Grant Janke	21 (substituted on)	12	21 (substituted on)	11	11	12	12		—N/a	—N/a	—N/a	7	0	0	0	0	0
Nazeem Wood	22 (substituted on)	22 (substituted on)	14	15					—N/a	—N/a	—N/a	4	1	0	0	0	5
Henri Boshoff		1							—N/a	—N/a	—N/a	1	0	0	0	0	0
Lorenzo Gordon		14	15		15	11	22 (substituted on)	14	—N/a	—N/a	—N/a	6	0	0	0	0	0
Wihan Jacobs		18 (substituted on)	8	8	8			8	—N/a	—N/a	—N/a	5	0	0	0	0	0
Thabo Mabuza		19	6	6	6	6	6	19 (substituted on)	—N/a	—N/a	—N/a	6	2	0	0	0	10
Leighton van Wyk		21 (substituted on)	12	21 (substituted on)	21 (substituted on)	21 (substituted on)	21 (substituted on)	12	—N/a	—N/a	—N/a	7	0	0	0	0	0
Heinrich Roelfse			17 (substituted on)			17 (substituted on)	17 (substituted on)	3	—N/a	—N/a	—N/a	4	0	0	0	0	0
Ethan Jantjies			20 (substituted on)				20 (substituted on)	20 (substituted on)	—N/a	—N/a	—N/a	3	0	0	0	0	0
Hardus Pretorius				22 (substituted on)		22 (substituted on)	14		—N/a	—N/a	—N/a	3	2	0	0	0	10
Eckhard van der Westhuizen								16 (substituted on)	—N/a	—N/a	—N/a	1	0	0	0	0	0
Warren Potgieter								21 (substituted on)	—N/a	—N/a	—N/a	1	0	1	0	0	2
Martin Steyn								22 (substituted on)	—N/a	—N/a	—N/a	1	0	0	0	0	0
Total												8	30	18	8	0	208
Njabulo Gumede, Malope Masemola and Sive Mazosiwe were named in the squad, but not included in a matchday squad.

Free State XV
Name	GRF	LEO	GRQ	SHA	GRF	LEO	GRQ	SHA	WPr	GRQ	F	App	Try	Con	Pen	DG	Pts
Quintin Vorster	1	1	1	1							—N/a	4	0	0	0	0	0
Reinach Venter	2	2	2	2	16 (substituted on)		2	2	2	2	—N/a	9	1	0	0	0	5
Günther Janse van Vuuren	3	3	3	3	3	3	18 (substituted on)	16 (substituted on)	18 (substituted on)	3	—N/a	10	2	0	0	0	10
Sibabalo Qoma	4	4	4	4	4	18 (substituted on)	19 (substituted on)	4	4		—N/a	9	0	0	0	0	0
JP du Preez	5	5	5	5			5				—N/a	5	1	0	0	0	5
Niell Jordaan	6	6	7	6	6	8	6	6	6	6	—N/a	10	3	0	0	0	15
Gerhard Olivier	7	7	6	7	7	6	7		7	7	—N/a	9	1	0	0	0	5
Jasper Wiese	8	8	8	8	8	19 (substituted on)	8	8	8	8	—N/a	10	5	0	0	0	25
Rudy Paige	9	9	9	9	21 (substituted on)	9		9	9	9	—N/a	9	0	0	0	0	0
Ernst Stapelberg	10	15	10	10	10	10			10	10	—N/a	8	3	20	2	0	61
Vuyani Maqina	11				22 (substituted on)		11	11	11	11	—N/a	6	1	0	0	0	5
Ali Mgijima	12	12	13	22 (substituted on)	12	22	14	14			—N/a	7	1	0	0	0	5
Tertius Kruger	13	13	12	12							—N/a	4	6	0	0	0	30
JP Coetzee	14	14	14								—N/a	3	1	0	0	0	5
Darren Adonis	15	11	15	15		11	15	15	15	15	—N/a	9	0	0	0	0	0
Marnus van der Merwe	16 (substituted on)	16 (substituted on)	16 (substituted on)	16 (substituted on)		16 (substituted on)		18 (substituted on)			—N/a	6	3	0	0	0	15
Boan Venter	17 (substituted on)	17 (substituted on)	17 (substituted on)	17 (substituted on)	17 (substituted on)	17 (substituted on)	17 (substituted on)	17 (substituted on)	17 (substituted on)	1	—N/a	10	0	0	0	0	0
Louis Conradie	18 (substituted on)				18 (substituted on)	5					—N/a	3	0	0	0	0	0
Stephan Malan	19 (substituted on)					4	20 (substituted on)	7	20 (substituted on)	4	—N/a	6	0	0	0	0	0
Daniel Maartens	20 (substituted on)	19 (substituted on)	20 (substituted on)	20 (substituted on)	20 (substituted on)	20 (substituted on)					—N/a	6	2	0	0	0	10
Benhard Janse van Rensburg	21 (substituted on)	10	21 (substituted on)	13	13	13	13	13	13	13	—N/a	10	1	12	0	0	29
Ruben de Haas	22 (substituted on)	21 (substituted on)	22 (substituted on)								—N/a	3	0	0	0	0	0
Justin Basson		18 (substituted on)	18 (substituted on)	18 (substituted on)	5		4	19 (substituted on)	19 (substituted on)	18 (substituted on)	—N/a	8	0	0	0	0	0
Ntokozo Vidima		20 (substituted on)	19 (substituted on)		19 (substituted on)	7		20 (substituted on)	22	20 (substituted on)	—N/a	6	0	0	0	0	0
Aya Oliphant		22 (substituted on)	11	11							—N/a	3	2	0	0	0	10
Sango Xamlashe				14	14		22 (substituted on)	22 (substituted on)		22	—N/a	4	1	0	0	0	5
Erich de Jager				19 (substituted on)	1	1	1	1	1		—N/a	6	1	0	0	0	5
Dian Badenhorst				21 (substituted on)							—N/a	1	0	0	0	0	0
Joseph Dweba					2	2	16 (substituted on)		16 (substituted on)	16 (substituted on)	—N/a	5	1	0	0	0	5
Ruan van Rensburg					9	14	21 (substituted on)	21 (substituted on)	21 (substituted on)	21 (substituted on)	—N/a	6	1	0	0	0	5
Lloyd Greeff					11	12	12	12			—N/a	4	0	1	0	0	2
Ryno Eksteen					15	15	10	10			—N/a	4	0	0	0	0	0
Zee Mkhabela						21 (substituted on)	9				—N/a	2	1	0	0	0	5
Luan de Bruin							3	3	3	17 (substituted on)	—N/a	4	0	0	0	0	0
Dennis Visser								5	5	5	—N/a	3	0	0	0	0	0
Carel-Jan Coetzee									12	12	—N/a	2	3	0	0	0	15
Francois Agenbach									14	14	—N/a	2	0	0	0	0	0
Ox Nché										19 (substituted on)	—N/a	1	0	0	0	0	0
penalty try												–	2	–	–	–	14
Total												10	43	33	2	0	291
Gideon Beukes, Carel du Preez, Brendon Fortuin, Armand Grobler, Njabulo Gumede, Alex Jonker, Helgard Meyer, Jannes Snyman and Kabous van Schalkwyk were named in the squad, but not included in a matchday squad.

Golden Lions XV
Name	PMA	WEL	GFA	BUL	PMA	WEL	GFA	BUL	SHA	SF	F	App	Try	Con	Pen	DG	Pts
Sti Sithole	1		1	1	1		1	1	1	—N/a	—N/a	7	1	0	0	0	5
Corné Fourie	2	2	16 (substituted on)					16 (substituted on)		—N/a	—N/a	4	2	0	0	0	10
Chergin Fillies	3	3	3			3	3		17 (substituted on)	—N/a	—N/a	6	1	0	0	0	5
Jaco Willemse	4									—N/a	—N/a	1	0	0	0	0	0
Rhyno Herbst	5	5			5	5	5	5	5	—N/a	—N/a	7	1	0	0	0	5
Len Massyn	6	7	18 (substituted on)		8	8	8		8	—N/a	—N/a	7	0	0	0	0	0
Robert Kruger	7		4			4		4	4	—N/a	—N/a	5	0	0	0	0	0
Jo-Hanko de Villiers	8	8								—N/a	—N/a	2	0	0	0	0	0
Marco Jansen van Vuren	9		20 (substituted on)	20 (substituted on)	20 (substituted on)					—N/a	—N/a	4	1	0	0	0	5
Shaun Reynolds	10	10	10		10			10	10	—N/a	—N/a	6	5	25	0	0	75
Selom Gavor	11				14	14	14			—N/a	—N/a	4	1	0	0	0	5
Wayne van der Bank	12	12	13	13	12	13	13			—N/a	—N/a	7	4	0	0	0	20
Jan-Louis la Grange	13	13	14	14	13		21 (substituted on)	22 (substituted on)	21 (substituted on)	—N/a	—N/a	8	3	0	0	0	15
Aphiwe Dyantyi	14									—N/a	—N/a	1	0	0	0	0	0
Siya Masuku	15	22 (substituted on)	21 (substituted on)	21 (substituted on)	21	10				—N/a	—N/a	5	3	9	0	0	33
Pieter Jansen	16 (substituted on)	16 (substituted on)	2	2	2	16 (substituted on)	2		2	—N/a	—N/a	8	2	0	0	0	10
Nico du Plessis	17 (substituted on)	17 (substituted on)	17 (substituted on)							—N/a	—N/a	3	0	0	0	0	0
Reinhard Nothnagel	18 (substituted on)	4					18 (substituted on)		18 (substituted on)	—N/a	—N/a	4	0	0	0	0	0
Driaan Bester	19 (substituted on)	18 (substituted on)								—N/a	—N/a	2	0	0	0	0	0
James Venter	20 (substituted on)	6	8	8	6		6	6	6	—N/a	—N/a	8	4	0	0	0	20
Bradley Thain	21 (substituted on)	9				20 (substituted on)			9	—N/a	—N/a	4	2	0	0	0	10
Eddie Fouché	22 (substituted on)	21 (substituted on)	22 (substituted on)	22 (substituted on)		12	12			—N/a	—N/a	6	1	0	0	0	5
Stephen Bhasera		1			17 (substituted on)	1	17 (substituted on)			—N/a	—N/a	4	1	0	0	0	5
Ronald Brown		11								—N/a	—N/a	1	1	0	0	0	5
Tyreeq February		14								—N/a	—N/a	1	0	0	0	0	0
Jeanluc Cilliers		15	15	15	15	15	15			—N/a	—N/a	6	1	13	3	0	40
Phumzile Maqondwana		19 (substituted on)	6	6	19	6	19 (substituted on)			—N/a	—N/a	5	3	0	0	0	15
Morné van den Berg		20 (substituted on)				9	20 (substituted on)		20 (substituted on)	—N/a	—N/a	4	2	0	0	0	10
Ruan Vermaak			5	5						—N/a	—N/a	2	0	0	0	0	0
Vincent Tshituka			7	7	7	7	7	18 (substituted on)	7	—N/a	—N/a	7	3	0	0	0	15
Ross Cronjé			9					9		—N/a	—N/a	2	0	0	0	0	0
Anthony Volmink			11	11	11	11	11			—N/a	—N/a	5	2	0	0	0	10
Howard Mnisi			12	12	22 (substituted on)			12		—N/a	—N/a	4	1	0	0	0	5
Cristen van Niekerk			19 (substituted on)	4						—N/a	—N/a	2	0	0	0	0	0
Jacobie Adriaanse				3	3				3	—N/a	—N/a	3	0	0	0	0	0
Dillon Smit				9				20 (substituted on)		—N/a	—N/a	2	0	0	0	0	0
Ashlon Davids				10	9		9	21 (substituted on)		—N/a	—N/a	4	0	1	0	0	2
HP van Schoor				16 (substituted on)	16	2	16 (substituted on)		16 (substituted on)	—N/a	—N/a	4	0	0	0	0	0
Leo Kruger				17 (substituted on)		17 (substituted on)				—N/a	—N/a	2	0	0	0	0	0
Conor Brockschmidt				18 (substituted on)	4	18 (substituted on)	4			—N/a	—N/a	4	0	0	0	0	0
Darrien Landsberg				19 (substituted on)	18	19 (substituted on)				—N/a	—N/a	2	1	0	0	0	5
Inny Radebe						21 (substituted on)	10			—N/a	—N/a	2	0	0	0	0	0
Austin Davids						22 (substituted on)				—N/a	—N/a	1	1	0	0	0	5
Courtnall Skosan							22 (substituted on)	11		—N/a	—N/a	2	4	0	0	0	20
Malcolm Marx								2		—N/a	—N/a	1	0	0	0	0	0
Johannes Jonker								3		—N/a	—N/a	1	0	0	0	0	0
Cyle Brink								7		—N/a	—N/a	1	0	0	0	0	0
Warren Whiteley								8		—N/a	—N/a	1	0	0	0	0	0
Lionel Mapoe								13		—N/a	—N/a	1	0	0	0	0	0
Madosh Tambwe								14	22 (substituted on)	—N/a	—N/a	2	0	0	0	0	0
Ruan Combrinck								15		—N/a	—N/a	1	2	0	0	0	10
Jacques van Rooyen								17 (substituted on)		—N/a	—N/a	1	1	0	0	0	5
Hacjivah Dayimani								19 (substituted on)		—N/a	—N/a	1	0	0	0	0	0
Sylvian Mahuza									11	—N/a	—N/a	1	0	0	0	0	0
Manuel Rass									12	—N/a	—N/a	1	0	0	0	0	0
Wandisile Simelane									13	—N/a	—N/a	1	1	0	0	0	5
Tyrone Green									14	—N/a	—N/a	1	0	0	0	0	0
Gianni Lombard									15	—N/a	—N/a	1	0	0	0	0	0
PJ Steenkamp									19 (substituted on)	—N/a	—N/a	1	0	0	0	0	0
penalty try												–	1	–	–	–	7
Total												9	56	48	3	0	387

Griffons
Name	LEO	FSt	SHA	GRQ	FSt	SHA	LEO	GRQ	QF	SF	F	App	Try	Con	Pen	DG	Pts
Barend Potgieter	1	1	1	1	1		1	1	—N/a	—N/a	—N/a	7	1	0	0	0	5
Anrich Alberts	2	2	2	2	2	2	2	2	—N/a	—N/a	—N/a	8	5	0	0	0	25
Danie van der Merwe	3	3	3	3	17 (substituted on)	3	3	3	—N/a	—N/a	—N/a	8	2	0	0	0	10
Gavin Annandale	4	4	4		4	4	4	4	—N/a	—N/a	—N/a	7	1	0	0	0	5
Neil Claassen	5	5	5	5	5	5	5	5	—N/a	—N/a	—N/a	8	2	0	0	0	10
Henco Greyling	6	6	6	6	19 (substituted on)	19 (substituted on)	19 (substituted on)	18 (substituted on)	—N/a	—N/a	—N/a	8	0	0	0	0	0
Jean Pretorius	7	7	7	7	6	20 (substituted on)	18 (substituted on)	19 (substituted on)	—N/a	—N/a	—N/a	8	3	0	0	0	15
Cody Basson	8	8	8	8	8	8	8	8	—N/a	—N/a	—N/a	8	5	0	0	0	25
Malcolm-Kerr Till	9	9	21 (substituted on)	20 (substituted on)	21 (substituted on)	21 (substituted on)	20 (substituted on)	20 (substituted on)	—N/a	—N/a	—N/a	8	0	0	0	0	0
Jaun Kotzé	10	10	10	10	10	10	10	10	—N/a	—N/a	—N/a	8	3	26	2	0	73
Rodney Damons	11	11	11	11	11	11	11	22 (substituted on)	—N/a	—N/a	—N/a	8	4	0	0	0	20
Arthur Williams	12	12	22 (substituted on)	12	12	12	12	12	—N/a	—N/a	—N/a	8	1	0	0	0	5
Duan Pretorius	13	13	12	15	15	13	13	15	—N/a	—N/a	—N/a	8	4	1	0	0	22
Warren Williams	14	14	14	14			22 (substituted on)	11	—N/a	—N/a	—N/a	6	1	0	0	0	5
Tertius Maarman	15	15	15		14				—N/a	—N/a	—N/a	4	0	0	0	0	0
JP Mans	16 (substituted on)	16 (substituted on)	16 (substituted on)	16	16 (substituted on)	1	17 (substituted on)	16 (substituted on)	—N/a	—N/a	—N/a	7	1	0	0	0	5
Rudi Britz	17 (substituted on)	17 (substituted on)		17 (substituted on)	3	17 (substituted on)		17 (substituted on)	—N/a	—N/a	—N/a	6	0	0	0	0	0
JP Alberts	18 (substituted on)	18 (substituted on)	18 (substituted on)	18 (substituted on)		18	21 (substituted on)		—N/a	—N/a	—N/a	5	0	0	0	0	0
Vincent Maruping	19 (substituted on)	19 (substituted on)	19 (substituted on)	4	7	7	7	7	—N/a	—N/a	—N/a	8	2	0	0	0	10
Thato Mavundla	20 (substituted on)	20 (substituted on)	20 (substituted on)	19 (substituted on)	20 (substituted on)	6	6	6	—N/a	—N/a	—N/a	8	0	0	0	0	0
Shirwin Cupido	21 (substituted on)	21 (substituted on)	9	9	9	9	9	9	—N/a	—N/a	—N/a	8	1	0	0	0	5
Joubert Engelbrecht	22 (substituted on)	22 (substituted on)	13	13	13	22 (substituted on)		13	—N/a	—N/a	—N/a	7	3	0	0	0	15
JP Smith			17 (substituted on)						—N/a	—N/a	—N/a	1	0	0	0	0	0
Wynand Pienaar				21 (substituted on)	22 (substituted on)	15	15	21 (substituted on)	—N/a	—N/a	—N/a	5	0	0	0	0	0
Ezrick Alexander				22 (substituted on)		14	14	14	—N/a	—N/a	—N/a	4	2	0	0	0	10
PW Botha					18 (substituted on)				—N/a	—N/a	—N/a	1	0	0	0	0	0
Johan Meintjies						16 (substituted on)	16		—N/a	—N/a	—N/a	1	0	0	0	0	0
Total												8	41	27	2	0	265
Jaywinn Juries and Hennie Venter were named in the squad, but not included in a matchday squad.

Griquas
Name	SHA	LEO	FSt	GRF	LEO	FSt	SHA	GRF	BOL	FSt	PMA	App	Try	Con	Pen	DG	Pts
Liam Hendricks	1								17 (substituted on)	17 (substituted on)	17 (substituted on)	4	0	0	0	0	0
AJ le Roux	2	2	2		16 (substituted on)	16 (substituted on)	16 (substituted on)	2	16 (substituted on)	16 (substituted on)	16 (substituted on)	10	3	0	0	0	15
NJ Oosthuizen	3	1	1	17 (substituted on)		17 (substituted on)	3	3	3	3	3	10	0	0	0	0	0
Jono Janse van Rensburg	4	4	4	18 (substituted on)	8		19 (substituted on)	8		6	21 (substituted on)	9	2	0	0	0	10
Pieter Jansen van Vuren	5	5	5		5	5	5		5	5	5	9	3	0	0	0	15
Wendal Wehr	6	6	6	19 (substituted on)	6	6						6	0	0	0	0	0
Sias Koen	7	7	7	7		7	7	19 (substituted on)	19 (substituted on)	7	7	10	3	0	0	0	15
De Wet Kruger	8	19 (substituted on)	19 (substituted on)	6	19 (substituted on)		21 (substituted on)	7	7		6	9	2	0	0	0	10
Louis Venter	9	9	9		20 (substituted on)		20 (substituted on)	9	20 (substituted on)			7	3	0	0	0	15
André Swarts	10	10	10	21 (substituted on)	10		22 (substituted on)	21 (substituted on)	21 (substituted on)	22 (substituted on)	22 (substituted on)	10	2	17	3	0	53
Enver Brandt	11	11	11		11	11						5	11	0	0	0	55
Christopher Bosch	12	12	12	12	13	22 (substituted on)	13	13	13	13	13	11	2	0	0	0	10
Kyle Steyn	13	13	13	13	14	13			11	11	11	9	7	0	0	0	35
Ederies Arendse	14	14	14		22 (substituted on)	14			14	14	14	8	2	1	0	0	12
Eric Zana	15	15	15									3	0	1	0	0	2
Khwezi Mkhafu	16 (substituted on)		17 (substituted on)	16 (substituted on)	17 (substituted on)	2	2	16 (substituted on)	2	2	2	10	2	0	0	0	10
Ruan Kramer	17 (substituted on)	3	3	3	3	3	18 (substituted on)	17 (substituted on)		18 (substituted on)	18 (substituted on)	10	0	0	0	0	0
Wandile Putuma	18 (substituted on)	18 (substituted on)				18 (substituted on)		5				4	0	0	0	0	0
Conway Pretorius	19 (substituted on)	8	8	8	7	8	8		8	8	8	10	4	0	0	0	20
Damian Stevens	20 (substituted on)			20 (substituted on)		20 (substituted on)				20 (substituted on)	20	4	0	0	0	0	0
Pieter-Steyn de Wet	21 (substituted on)		22 (substituted on)	10		21 (substituted on)						4	0	9	0	0	18
Tythan Adams	22 (substituted on)	22 (substituted on)		14			11	11				5	2	0	0	0	10
Wilmar Arnoldi		16 (substituted on)	16 (substituted on)	2	2							4	0	0	0	0	0
Doctor Booysen		17 (substituted on)										1	0	0	0	0	0
Christiaan Meyer		20 (substituted on)	20 (substituted on)	9	9	9	9	20 (substituted on)	9	9	9	10	1	0	0	0	5
Johnathan Francke		21 (substituted on)	21 (substituted on)		12	12	12	12	12	12	12	9	2	0	0	0	10
Sintu Manjezi			18 (substituted on)	5	4	4	4	18 (substituted on)	4	4	4	9	0	0	0	0	0
Devon Martinus				1	1	1	1	1	1	1	1	8	0	0	0	0	0
Jeremy Jordaan				4								1	0	0	0	0	0
Godfrey Ramaboea				11			14	14	22 (substituted on)	21 (substituted on)		5	2	0	0	0	10
AJ Coertzen				15	15	15		15	15	15	15	7	4	0	0	0	20
Luxolo Ntsepe				22 (substituted on)			15	22 (substituted on)				3	1	0	0	0	5
FP Pelser					18 (substituted on)			4	18 (substituted on)	19 (substituted on)	19 (substituted on)	5	1	0	0	0	5
George Whitehead					21 (substituted on)	10	10	10	10	10	10	7	0	22	17	0	95
Kevin Kaba						19 (substituted on)	6	6	6			4	0	0	0	0	0
Ewald van der Westhuizen							17 (substituted on)					1	0	0	0	0	0
Total												11	59	50	20	0	455
Renier Botha, Stephan Janse van Rensburg and Shaun McDonald were named in the squad, but not included in a matchday squad.

Leopards
Name	GRF	GRQ	FSt	SHA	GRQ	FSt	SHA	GRF	QF	SF	F	App	Try	Con	Pen	DG	Pts
Matimu Manganyi	1	17 (substituted on)			3	3	3		—N/a	—N/a	—N/a	5	0	0	0	0	0
Marius Stander	2	2					16 (substituted on)	16 (substituted on)	—N/a	—N/a	—N/a	4	0	0	0	0	0
Theodore Ferreira	3								—N/a	—N/a	—N/a	1	0	0	0	0	0
Stairs Mhlongo	4	4		18 (substituted on)	4	4	4		—N/a	—N/a	—N/a	6	1	0	0	0	5
Jaco Swanepoel	5	5	18 (substituted on)		18 (substituted on)	18 (substituted on)	18 (substituted on)	4	—N/a	—N/a	—N/a	7	0	0	0	0	0
Muziwandile Mazibuko	6	6		19 (substituted on)					—N/a	—N/a	—N/a	3	0	0	0	0	0
Boela Venter	7	19 (substituted on)	19 (substituted on)	4	19 (substituted on)	19 (substituted on)	7	18 (substituted on)	—N/a	—N/a	—N/a	8	1	0	0	0	5
Juan Language	8								—N/a	—N/a	—N/a	1	0	0	0	0	0
Eugene Hare	9	9	20 (substituted on)	20 (substituted on)	20 (substituted on)			14	—N/a	—N/a	—N/a	6	3	0	0	0	15
DP de Lange	10	10	21 (substituted on)	21 (substituted on)	21 (substituted on)	21	10		—N/a	—N/a	—N/a	6	0	6	0	0	12
Gene Willemse	11	11	11	11	11	15			—N/a	—N/a	—N/a	6	3	0	0	0	15
Akhona Nela	12	22 (substituted on)							—N/a	—N/a	—N/a	2	0	0	0	0	0
Bradley Moolman	13	12	12	12	12	13	13	13	—N/a	—N/a	—N/a	8	2	0	0	0	10
Justin Newman	14	14	14	14	14	14			—N/a	—N/a	—N/a	6	2	0	0	0	10
Tapiwa Mafura	15	15	15	22			15	15	—N/a	—N/a	—N/a	5	0	0	0	0	0
Dane van der Westhuyzen	16 (substituted on)		16 (substituted on)	16 (substituted on)	16 (substituted on)	16	2	2	—N/a	—N/a	—N/a	6	1	0	0	0	5
Morné Strydom	17 (substituted on)								—N/a	—N/a	—N/a	1	0	0	0	0	0
HP Swart	18 (substituted on)	7	7	8	8	8	8	7	—N/a	—N/a	—N/a	8	2	0	0	0	10
Gideon van der Merwe	19 (substituted on)		6	6	6	6	6	6	—N/a	—N/a	—N/a	7	2	0	0	0	10
Nkosana Mathaba	20 (substituted on)	20 (substituted on)				20 (substituted on)	20 (substituted on)	20 (substituted on)	—N/a	—N/a	—N/a	5	0	0	0	0	0
Schalk Hugo	21 (substituted on)	21 (substituted on)	10	10	10	10	21 (substituted on)	10	—N/a	—N/a	—N/a	8	1	18	8	0	65
Evardi Boshoff	22	13	13	13	13	22 (substituted on)	22 (substituted on)	21 (substituted on)	—N/a	—N/a	—N/a	7	2	0	0	0	10
Nelius Theron		1	17 (substituted on)	17 (substituted on)					—N/a	—N/a	—N/a	3	0	0	0	0	0
Robert Hunt		3	3	3	17 (substituted on)		17 (substituted on)	3	—N/a	—N/a	—N/a	6	1	0	0	0	5
Tiaan Bezuidenhout		8	8						—N/a	—N/a	—N/a	2	1	0	0	0	5
Louis van der Westhuizen		16 (substituted on)	2	2	2	2			—N/a	—N/a	—N/a	5	1	0	0	0	5
Walt Steenkamp		18 (substituted on)	5	5	5	5	5	5	—N/a	—N/a	—N/a	7	0	0	0	0	0
Joe Smith			1	1	1	1	1	1	—N/a	—N/a	—N/a	6	1	0	0	0	5
Johan Retief			4	7	7	7			—N/a	—N/a	—N/a	4	0	0	0	0	0
Chriswill September			9	9	9	9	9	9	—N/a	—N/a	—N/a	6	1	0	0	0	5
Lungelo Gosa			22 (substituted on)	15	15	11	11	11	—N/a	—N/a	—N/a	6	0	0	0	0	0
Gerhard Nortier					22	12	12	12	—N/a	—N/a	—N/a	3	0	0	0	0	0
Ruan Grundlingh						17 (substituted on)		17 (substituted on)	—N/a	—N/a	—N/a	2	0	0	0	0	0
Frans Botha							14		—N/a	—N/a	—N/a	1	1	0	0	0	5
Edward Haas							19 (substituted on)	8	—N/a	—N/a	—N/a	2	0	0	0	0	0
Ruan Viljoen								19 (substituted on)	—N/a	—N/a	—N/a	1	0	0	0	0	0
Divan Fick								22 (substituted on)	—N/a	—N/a	—N/a	1	0	0	0	0	0
Total												8	26	24	8	0	202
Dean Gordon, Henko Marais, Percy Mngadi, Merlynn Pieterse, Dean Stokes and Estehan Visagie were named in the squad, but not included in a matchday squad.

Pumas
Name	BUL	LIO	WEL	GFA	BUL	LIO	WEL	GFA	BUL	SHA	GRQ	App	Try	Con	Pen	DG	Pts
De-Jay Terblanche	1	1	1	17 (substituted on)	1	1	17 (substituted on)	1	1	17 (substituted on)	1	11	2	0	0	0	10
Marko Janse van Rensburg	2	2	16 (substituted on)	2	2	2	16 (substituted on)	2	2	2	2	11	7	0	0	0	35
Louis Albertse	3	3			3		3	17 (substituted on)				5	0	0	0	0	0
Tazz Fuzani	4	4										2	0	0	0	0	0
Cameron Lindsay	5	5	5	5	5	18 (substituted on)	5	18 (substituted on)	5	5	5	11	1	0	0	0	5
Brian Shabangu	6	6					6		19 (substituted on)	19		4	0	0	0	0	0
Nardus van der Walt	7	8	19 (substituted on)	7	7	7		7				7	1	0	0	0	5
Willie Engelbrecht	8		8	8	8	8	8	8	8	8	8	10	2	0	0	0	10
Stefan Ungerer	9	9		9	9	9	21 (substituted on)	20 (substituted on)	9	9	9	10	4	0	0	0	20
Chris Smith	10	10	21 (substituted on)	10	10		10	10	10	10	10	10	0	37	19	0	131
Ruwellyn Isbell	11	11	11	11	11	11		11	11	11	11	10	9	0	0	0	45
Hennie Skorbinski	12	12	13	12	12	12	12		12	13	13	10	2	0	0	0	10
Barend Smit	13	13				21 (substituted on)	22 (substituted on)	21 (substituted on)				5	0	4	0	0	8
JP Lewis	14	14	14	14	14			14				6	5	0	0	0	25
Devon Williams	15	15	15		15	15	15	15	15	21 (substituted on)	15	10	5	0	0	0	25
Simon Westraadt	16 (substituted on)			1		17 (substituted on)	2	16 (substituted on)	17 (substituted on)	1	17 (substituted on)	8	2	0	0	0	10
Marné Coetzee	17 (substituted on)		3	3		3		3	3	3	3	8	1	0	0	0	5
Jannie Stander	18 (substituted on)	18 (substituted on)	4									3	0	0	0	0	0
Hilton Lobberts	19 (substituted on)	7	7			19 (substituted on)	7	19 (substituted on)	7		19 (substituted on)	8	0	0	0	0	0
Reynier van Rooyen	20 (substituted on)	20 (substituted on)	9	20 (substituted on)	20 (substituted on)	20 (substituted on)	9		20 (substituted on)	20 (substituted on)	20 (substituted on)	10	2	0	0	0	10
Justin van Staden	21 (substituted on)	21	10	15	21 (substituted on)	10			21 (substituted on)	15	21 (substituted on)	8	0	14	1	1	34
Trompie Pretorius	22 (substituted on)	22 (substituted on)	22 (substituted on)	13	13			22 (substituted on)	13	22 (substituted on)	22 (substituted on)	9	1	0	0	0	5
Frank Herne		16 (substituted on)	2	16 (substituted on)	16 (substituted on)	16 (substituted on)			16 (substituted on)	16 (substituted on)	16 (substituted on)	8	2	0	0	0	10
Andrew Beerwinkel		17 (substituted on)	17 (substituted on)		17 (substituted on)							3	0	0	0	0	0
Jeandré Rudolph		19 (substituted on)	6	6	6	6		6	6	6		8	3	0	0	0	15
Henko Marais			12	21 (substituted on)	22 (substituted on)			12	22 (substituted on)	12	12	7	1	0	0	0	5
Hugo Kloppers			18 (substituted on)	18 (substituted on)	18 (substituted on)	5	18 (substituted on)	5	18 (substituted on)	18 (substituted on)	18 (substituted on)	9	1	0	0	0	5
Abrie Griesel			20 (substituted on)				20 (substituted on)	9				3	1	0	0	0	5
Stefan Willemse				4	4	4	19 (substituted on)		4	7	7	7	2	0	0	0	10
Francois Kleinhans				19 (substituted on)	19 (substituted on)						6	3	0	0	0	0	0
Gerrit Smith				22 (substituted on)		13						2	1	0	0	0	5
Morné Joubert						14	14		14	14	14	5	4	0	0	0	20
Alwayno Visagie						22 (substituted on)	13					2	2	0	0	0	10
Morgan Naudé							1					1	0	0	0	0	0
Le Roux Roets							4	4		4	4	4	2	0	0	0	10
Boeta Vermaak							11					1	0	0	0	0	0
Ryan Nell								13				1	1	0	0	0	5
penalty try												–	1	–	–	–	7
Total												11	65	55	20	1	500
Gert Cronjé, Reuben Johannes, Ruaan Lerm, Kobus Marais, Neil Maritz, Khwezi Mona and Marnus Schoeman were named in the squad, but not included in a matchday squad.

Sharks XV
Name	GRQ	GRF	LEO	FSt	GRF	LEO	GRQ	FSt	LIO	PMA	F	App	Try	Con	Pen	DG	Pts
Jordan Els	1	17 (substituted on)	17 (substituted on)	17 (substituted on)	1	1	1	17	1		—N/a	8	0	0	0	0	0
Kerron van Vuuren	2	2	16 (substituted on)	16 (substituted on)	2	2	16 (substituted on)	16 (substituted on)	16 (substituted on)	16 (substituted on)	—N/a	10	0	0	0	0	0
Khutha Mchunu	3	3	3	3	3	3	17 (substituted on)	18 (substituted on)	17 (substituted on)	18 (substituted on)	—N/a	10	1	0	0	0	5
Gideon Koegelenberg	4	4	4	4						4	—N/a	5	1	0	0	0	5
Jean Droste	5	18 (substituted on)		19 (substituted on)							—N/a	3	0	0	0	0	0
Wian Vosloo	6	6		6	6	6	6	7	7		—N/a	8	1	0	0	0	5
Rikus Zwart	7				4	4			4	19 (substituted on)	—N/a	5	0	0	0	0	0
Kwanda Dimaza	8	7	7	7	7	7	19 (substituted on)		20 (substituted on)	7	—N/a	9	2	0	0	0	10
Grant Williams	9	20 (substituted on)	9	9	21 (substituted on)		20 (substituted on)		9	9	—N/a	8	5	0	0	0	25
Garth April	10	10	10				10	21 (substituted on)	10	10	—N/a	7	3	21	3	0	66
Ilunga Mukendi	11					11			11		—N/a	3	2	0	0	0	10
Jeremy Ward	12	13	13	13	13	12	13	13	12	13	—N/a	10	6	0	0	0	30
Johan Deysel	13	12	12	12	12					12	—N/a	6	1	0	0	0	5
Morné Joubert	14										—N/a	1	1	0	0	0	5
Courtney Winnaar	15	15	15	15	15	15	15	15	15	15	—N/a	10	4	1	0	0	22
Andrew du Plessis	16 (substituted on)	16 (substituted on)	2	2	16 (substituted on)	16 (substituted on)	2				—N/a	7	1	0	0	0	5
Kyle Whyte	17 (substituted on)			18 (substituted on)	18 (substituted on)	18 (substituted on)				17 (substituted on)	—N/a	5	0	0	0	0	0
Andrew Evans	18 (substituted on)		18 (substituted on)		5	5	4	19 (substituted on)	5	5	—N/a	8	0	0	0	0	0
Cornelius Otto	19 (substituted on)	19 (substituted on)	6	20 (substituted on)	20 (substituted on)	20 (substituted on)			6	6	—N/a	8	0	0	0	0	0
Francois de Villiers	20 (substituted on)		20 (substituted on)	21 (substituted on)	9	9	9		21 (substituted on)	20 (substituted on)	—N/a	8	0	0	0	0	0
Alwayno Visagie	21 (substituted on)	22 (substituted on)									—N/a	2	0	0	0	0	0
Danrich Visagie	22 (substituted on)	21 (substituted on)	21 (substituted on)	10	10	10			22 (substituted on)	21 (substituted on)	—N/a	8	0	16	3	0	41
Mzamo Majola		1	1	1	17 (substituted on)	17 (substituted on)	18 (substituted on)		18 (substituted on)	1	—N/a	8	0	0	0	0	0
Hyron Andrews		5	5	5			5	4			—N/a	5	2	0	0	0	10
Tera Mtembu		8	8	8	8	8	8	8	8	8	—N/a	9	5	0	0	0	25
Michael Claassens		9									—N/a	1	0	0	0	0	0
Leolin Zas		11	11	11		22 (substituted on)	11	14			—N/a	6	4	0	0	0	20
Aphelele Fassi		14	14	14	11	14	21 (substituted on)		14	14	—N/a	8	4	2	0	0	24
JJ van der Mescht			19 (substituted on)		19 (substituted on)	19 (substituted on)			19 (substituted on)		—N/a	4	0	0	0	0	0
Tristan Blewett			22 (substituted on)		14	13			13	22 (substituted on)	—N/a	5	4	0	0	0	20
Kobus van Wyk				22 (substituted on)			14				—N/a	2	0	0	0	0	0
Rhyno Smith					22 (substituted on)		22 (substituted on)	22 (substituted on)			—N/a	3	0	2	1	0	7
James Bruce						21 (substituted on)					—N/a	1	0	0	0	0	0
Ross Geldenhuys							3	3		3	—N/a	3	1	0	0	0	5
Jacques Vermeulen							7				—N/a	1	1	0	0	0	5
Marius Louw							12	12			—N/a	2	3	0	0	0	15
Juan Schoeman								1			—N/a	1	0	0	0	0	0
Franco Marais								2	2	2	—N/a	3	0	0	0	0	0
Stephan Lewies								5			—N/a	1	0	0	0	0	0
Philip van der Walt								6			—N/a	1	0	0	0	0	0
Louis Schreuder								9			—N/a	1	2	0	0	0	10
Curwin Bosch								10			—N/a	1	0	3	1	0	9
Lwazi Mvovo								11			—N/a	1	0	0	0	0	0
Cameron Wright								20 (substituted on)			—N/a	1	0	0	0	0	0
John-Hubert Meyer									3		—N/a	1	0	0	0	0	0
Makazole Mapimpi										11	—N/a	1	0	0	0	0	0
Total												10	54	45	8	0	384
Zak Burger, Ryan Carlson, Ngoni Chidoma, Keegan Daniel, Keegan Haman, Marthinus Holtzhausen, Clifferd Jacobs, Benhard Janse van Rensburg, Khail Kotzenberg, Michael Meyer, Luyanda Mngadi, Mfundo Ndhlovu, Bandisa Ndlovu, Sanele Nohamba, William Squires and James Tedder were named in the squad, but not included in a matchday squad.

SWD Eagles
Name	EPE	BDR	BOL	WPr	EPE	BDR	BOL	WPr	QF	SF	F	App	Try	Con	Pen	DG	Pts
Teunis Nieuwoudt	1	1	1	1	17 (substituted on)	17 (substituted on)	1		—N/a	—N/a	—N/a	7	1	0	0	0	5
Jacques Vermaak	2	2	2	2	16 (substituted on)	16 (substituted on)	16 (substituted on)	2	—N/a	—N/a	—N/a	8	1	0	0	0	5
Basil Short	3	3			3	3			—N/a	—N/a	—N/a	4	0	0	0	0	0
Wiehan Hay	4	4	4	4	19 (substituted on)	4	4	4	—N/a	—N/a	—N/a	8	0	0	0	0	0
Cornell Hess	5	5	5	5	5	5	5	5	—N/a	—N/a	—N/a	8	0	0	0	0	0
Janneman Stander	6	6	20 (substituted on)	7	20 (substituted on)	20 (substituted on)	20 (substituted on)	19 (substituted on)	—N/a	—N/a	—N/a	8	2	0	0	0	10
Nicolaas Immelman	7	7	7	8	7	7	6	6	—N/a	—N/a	—N/a	8	1	0	0	0	5
Fabian Booysen	8	8	8						—N/a	—N/a	—N/a	3	0	0	0	0	0
Dillin Snel	9		9	9				20 (substituted on)	—N/a	—N/a	—N/a	4	0	0	0	0	0
Divan Nel	10	10	10						—N/a	—N/a	—N/a	3	0	7	2	0	20
Marlo Weich	11	14	14						—N/a	—N/a	—N/a	3	1	0	0	0	5
Marlou van Niekerk	12	12	12	12	12	12	12		—N/a	—N/a	—N/a	7	3	0	0	0	15
Kirsten Heyns	13	11	11	14	22 (substituted on)	21 (substituted on)	21 (substituted on)	21 (substituted on)	—N/a	—N/a	—N/a	8	0	0	0	0	0
Vuyo Mbotho	14	22 (substituted on)	22 (substituted on)	11					—N/a	—N/a	—N/a	4	0	0	0	0	0
Leighton Eksteen	15	15	15	15	15	15	15	15	—N/a	—N/a	—N/a	8	5	17	7	0	80
Le Roux Baard	16 (substituted on)	16 (substituted on)	16	6	2	2	2	16 (substituted on)	—N/a	—N/a	—N/a	7	0	0	0	0	0
Dewald Dekker	17 (substituted on)	17 (substituted on)	3	3	18 (substituted on)		18 (substituted on)	3	—N/a	—N/a	—N/a	7	0	0	0	0	0
Vukile Sofisa	18 (substituted on)		18 (substituted on)	18 (substituted on)		18 (substituted on)	3	17 (substituted on)	—N/a	—N/a	—N/a	6	0	0	0	0	0
Ruben Schoeman	19 (substituted on)	19 (substituted on)	19 (substituted on)	19 (substituted on)	4	19 (substituted on)	19 (substituted on)	18 (substituted on)	—N/a	—N/a	—N/a	8	1	0	0	0	5
Wayne Wilschut	20 (substituted on)	20 (substituted on)	6		6	6	8	8	—N/a	—N/a	—N/a	7	0	0	0	0	0
Robbie Petzer	21 (substituted on)	21 (substituted on)	21 (substituted on)	10	10	10	10	10	—N/a	—N/a	—N/a	8	0	0	0	0	0
Tyler Fisher	22 (substituted on)	13	13	13	13	13	13	13	—N/a	—N/a	—N/a	8	6	0	0	0	30
Johan Steyn		9			9	9	9	9	—N/a	—N/a	—N/a	5	3	0	0	0	15
Luxolo Koza		18 (substituted on)	17 (substituted on)	17 (substituted on)	1	1	17 (substituted on)	1	—N/a	—N/a	—N/a	7	0	0	0	0	0
Reinhardt Stears				16 (substituted on)					—N/a	—N/a	—N/a	1	0	0	0	0	0
Anton Smit				20 (substituted on)					—N/a	—N/a	—N/a	1	0	0	0	0	0
JP Duvenage				21 (substituted on)				12	—N/a	—N/a	—N/a	2	0	0	0	0	0
Ganfried May				22 (substituted on)		22 (substituted on)	22 (substituted on)	22 (substituted on)	—N/a	—N/a	—N/a	4	0	0	0	0	0
Davon Raubenheimer					8	8	7	7	—N/a	—N/a	—N/a	4	0	0	0	0	0
Alshaun Bock					11	14	14	14	—N/a	—N/a	—N/a	4	2	0	0	0	10
Adri Jacobs					14	11	11	11	—N/a	—N/a	—N/a	4	2	0	0	0	10
Leegan Moos					21 (substituted on)				—N/a	—N/a	—N/a	1	0	0	0	0	0
Total												8	28	24	9	0	215
Aiden Josephs and Denver Prins were named in the squad, but not included in a matchday squad.

Welwitschias
Name	GFA	BUL	LIO	PMA	GFA	BUL	LIO	PMA	QF	SF	F	App	Try	Con	Pen	DG	Pts
Des Sethie	1	1	17 (substituted on)	1	1	17 (substituted on)			—N/a	—N/a	—N/a	6	0	0	0	0	0
Obert Nortjé	2	2	2	2	2	2			—N/a	—N/a	—N/a	6	0	0	0	0	0
AJ de Klerk	3	3	3	3	3				—N/a	—N/a	—N/a	5	1	0	0	0	5
Mahepisa Tjeriko	4	19 (substituted on)	4	4	19 (substituted on)	19 (substituted on)	4	4	—N/a	—N/a	—N/a	8	0	0	0	0	0
Ruan Ludick	5	5		19 (substituted on)	4	4			—N/a	—N/a	—N/a	5	0	0	0	0	0
Rohan Kitshoff	6		6		6	6			—N/a	—N/a	—N/a	4	1	0	0	0	5
Max Katjijeko	7	7	5	5	5	5	5	6	—N/a	—N/a	—N/a	8	0	0	0	0	0
Leneve Damens	8	8	7	8	8	8			—N/a	—N/a	—N/a	6	1	0	0	0	5
Eugene Jantjies	9	9		9					—N/a	—N/a	—N/a	3	0	2	0	0	4
TC Kisting	10		9	21 (substituted on)	21 (substituted on)	21 (substituted on)			—N/a	—N/a	—N/a	5	0	1	0	0	2
Janré du Toit	11		14		11	14	13	13	—N/a	—N/a	—N/a	6	2	0	0	0	10
Darryl de la Harpe	12	12	12	12	22 (substituted on)	12			—N/a	—N/a	—N/a	6	2	0	0	0	10
JC Greyling	13	13	13	13	13	22 (substituted on)			—N/a	—N/a	—N/a	6	2	0	0	0	10
Gino Wilson	14		22 (substituted on)	14	14			21 (substituted on)	—N/a	—N/a	—N/a	5	0	0	0	0	0
Chrysander Botha	15		15	15		11			—N/a	—N/a	—N/a	4	0	0	0	0	0
Gert Lotter	16 (substituted on)								—N/a	—N/a	—N/a	1	0	0	0	0	0
Hans Breedt	17 (substituted on)	17 (substituted on)	1		17 (substituted on)	1	1	1	—N/a	—N/a	—N/a	7	0	0	0	0	0
Herman Grobler	18 (substituted on)	18 (substituted on)					17 (substituted on)	17 (substituted on)	—N/a	—N/a	—N/a	4	0	0	0	0	0
Denzil van Wyk	19 (substituted on)	4	19 (substituted on)				19 (substituted on)	5	—N/a	—N/a	—N/a	5	0	0	0	0	0
Adriaan Booysen	20 (substituted on)	20 (substituted on)	8	7	7				—N/a	—N/a	—N/a	5	1	0	0	0	5
PW Steenkamp	21 (substituted on)	10	10	10	10	10			—N/a	—N/a	—N/a	6	4	13	4	0	58
Mahco Prinsloo	22 (substituted on)	15		22 (substituted on)	15	15	15	15	—N/a	—N/a	—N/a	7	0	0	0	0	0
Cameron Langenhoven		6	20 (substituted on)					7	—N/a	—N/a	—N/a	3	0	0	0	0	0
Tuna Amutenya		11						22 (substituted on)	—N/a	—N/a	—N/a	2	0	0	1	0	3
David Philander		14							—N/a	—N/a	—N/a	1	0	0	0	0	0
Roderique Victor		16	16 (substituted on)		16 (substituted on)		2	2	—N/a	—N/a	—N/a	4	0	0	0	0	0
JC Winckler		21 (substituted on)	21 (substituted on)		9	9	9	9	—N/a	—N/a	—N/a	6	2	0	0	0	10
Johann Tromp		22 (substituted on)	11	11	12	13			—N/a	—N/a	—N/a	5	3	0	0	0	15
Hauta Veii			18 (substituted on)	18 (substituted on)		18 (substituted on)	3	3	—N/a	—N/a	—N/a	5	0	0	0	0	0
Thomasau Forbes				6	20 (substituted on)	7	6	8	—N/a	—N/a	—N/a	5	0	0	0	0	0
Niël van Vuuren				16 (substituted on)		16 (substituted on)	16 (substituted on)		—N/a	—N/a	—N/a	3	1	0	0	0	5
Jason Benade				17 (substituted on)			18 (substituted on)	16 (substituted on)	—N/a	—N/a	—N/a	3	0	0	0	0	0
Christo van der Merwe				20 (substituted on)		20 (substituted on)			—N/a	—N/a	—N/a	2	0	0	0	0	0
Casper Viviers					18 (substituted on)	3			—N/a	—N/a	—N/a	2	0	0	0	0	0
Winmar Rust							7		—N/a	—N/a	—N/a	1	0	0	0	0	0
James Marx							8	18 (substituted on)	—N/a	—N/a	—N/a	2	0	0	0	0	0
Aurelio Plato							10		—N/a	—N/a	—N/a	1	0	0	1	0	3
Nikin Cloete							11	11	—N/a	—N/a	—N/a	2	0	0	0	0	0
Francois Wiese							12		—N/a	—N/a	—N/a	1	0	0	0	0	0
Russell van Wyk							14	14	—N/a	—N/a	—N/a	2	0	0	0	0	0
Ngumee Nguaiko							20 (substituted on)	19 (substituted on)	—N/a	—N/a	—N/a	2	0	0	0	0	0
Dirk von Weidts							21 (substituted on)	20 (substituted on)	—N/a	—N/a	—N/a	2	0	1	0	0	2
Justin Nel							22 (substituted on)	10	—N/a	—N/a	—N/a	2	0	0	0	0	0
Camlo Martin								12	—N/a	—N/a	—N/a	1	0	0	0	0	0
Total												8	20	17	6	0	152

Western Province
Name	EPE	BDR	BOL	SWD	EPE	BDR	BOL	SWD	FSt	SF	F	App	Try	Con	Pen	DG	Pts
Alistair Vermaak	1	1	1		1	1		1		—N/a	—N/a	6	0	0	0	0	0
Dean Muir	2	2	16 (substituted on)					16 (substituted on)	16 (substituted on)	—N/a	—N/a	5	1	0	0	0	5
Frans Malherbe	3	3								—N/a	—N/a	2	0	0	0	0	0
Ernst van Rhyn	4		4	4	18 (substituted on)	4	4	4	4	—N/a	—N/a	8	0	0	0	0	0
Gary Porter	5									—N/a	—N/a	1	0	0	0	0	0
Jaco Coetzee	6	6		8		8	8			—N/a	—N/a	5	2	0	0	0	10
Johan du Toit	7	7	7	5	5	19 (substituted on)	5	7	5	—N/a	—N/a	9	2	0	0	0	10
Luke Stringer	8	8	8	7	7	6	6	6	6	—N/a	—N/a	9	1	0	0	0	5
Herschel Jantjies	9	9	9	21 (substituted on)	21 (substituted on)	20 (substituted on)	21 (substituted on)	9	9	—N/a	—N/a	9	3	0	0	0	15
Jean-Luc du Plessis	10	10								—N/a	—N/a	2	2	0	0	0	10
Grant Hermanus	11		22 (substituted on)		14				15	—N/a	—N/a	4	3	4	2	0	29
Joshua Stander	12	12	10	10	10		10	10		—N/a	—N/a	7	3	25	3	0	74
Dan Kriel	13	13	13	13	13	13		22 (substituted on)	12	—N/a	—N/a	8	0	0	0	0	0
Duncan Saal	14	14	14	14	22 (substituted on)	14	13	14	14	—N/a	—N/a	9	9	0	0	0	45
Tristan Leyds	15	15	15	22 (substituted on)	15	10	22 (substituted on)	15	10	—N/a	—N/a	9	3	9	0	0	33
Chad Solomon	16 (substituted on)	16 (substituted on)	2	16 (substituted on)	16 (substituted on)	16 (substituted on)	16 (substituted on)	2		—N/a	—N/a	8	2	0	0	0	10
Kwenzo Blose	17 (substituted on)	17 (substituted on)	17 (substituted on)	1						—N/a	—N/a	4	0	0	0	0	0
Neethling Fouché	18 (substituted on)	18 (substituted on)	3	3	3	18 (substituted on)	3	3	17 (substituted on)	—N/a	—N/a	9	0	0	0	0	0
Stephan de Wit	19 (substituted on)		6	20 (substituted on)	20 (substituted on)		20 (substituted on)	19 (substituted on)	18 (substituted on)	—N/a	—N/a	7	2	0	0	0	10
Nama Xaba	20 (substituted on)	20 (substituted on)								—N/a	—N/a	2	0	0	0	0	0
Labib Kannemeyer	21 (substituted on)	21 (substituted on)							21	—N/a	—N/a	2	1	0	0	0	5
Michal Haznar	22 (substituted on)									—N/a	—N/a	1	1	0	0	0	5
Marno Redelinghuys		4	20 (substituted on)	19 (substituted on)	8			20 (substituted on)	7	—N/a	—N/a	6	0	0	0	0	0
Ruben de Villiers		5	5							—N/a	—N/a	2	0	0	0	0	0
Edwill van der Merwe		11	11	11	11	11	11	11	11	—N/a	—N/a	8	3	0	0	0	15
Brenden Esterhuizen		19 (substituted on)		18 (substituted on)	4		18 (substituted on)			—N/a	—N/a	4	1	0	0	0	5
Daniël du Plessis		22 (substituted on)	12	12	12	12	12	12		—N/a	—N/a	7	5	0	0	0	25
Michael Kumbirai			18 (substituted on)	17 (substituted on)	17 (substituted on)	3	1	18 (substituted on)	3	—N/a	—N/a	7	0	0	0	0	0
Chris Massyn			19 (substituted on)	6	6	7	7		20 (substituted on)	—N/a	—N/a	6	1	0	0	0	5
Justin Phillips			21 (substituted on)	9	9	9	9	21 (substituted on)		—N/a	—N/a	6	2	0	0	0	10
Bongi Mbonambi				2						—N/a	—N/a	1	0	0	0	0	0
Craig Barry				15		15	15			—N/a	—N/a	3	3	0	0	0	15
Scarra Ntubeni					2	2	2		2	—N/a	—N/a	4	0	0	0	0	0
Nyasha Tarusenga					19					—N/a	—N/a	0	0	0	0	0	0
David Meihuizen						5				—N/a	—N/a	1	0	0	0	0	0
Caylib Oosthuizen						17 (substituted on)		17 (substituted on)	1	—N/a	—N/a	3	0	0	0	0	0
Tiaan Swanepoel						21 (substituted on)			22	—N/a	—N/a	1	0	1	0	0	2
Cornel Smit						22 (substituted on)				—N/a	—N/a	1	1	0	0	0	5
Logan Basson							14			—N/a	—N/a	1	0	0	0	0	0
Carlü Sadie							17 (substituted on)			—N/a	—N/a	1	0	0	0	0	0
Juarno Augustus							19 (substituted on)	8	8	—N/a	—N/a	3	3	0	0	0	15
Cobus Wiese								5		—N/a	—N/a	1	0	0	0	0	0
EW Viljoen								13		—N/a	—N/a	1	1	0	0	0	5
David Brits									13	—N/a	—N/a	1	1	0	0	0	5
JD Schickerling									19 (substituted on)	—N/a	—N/a	1	0	0	0	0	0
penalty try												–	1	–	–	–	7
Total												9	57	39	5	0	380
Jordan Chait, Paul de Wet, Michaine Fick, Wikus Groenewald, Cuan Hablutzel, JC Janse van Rensburg, Eduan Keyter, Nico Leonard, John Lourens, André Manuel, Lee-Marvin Mazibuko, Salmaan Moerat, Ruhan Nel, Nico Peyper, Jordan Sesink-Clee, Curtly Thomas, Joshua Vermeulen, Jondré Williams and Eduard Zandberg were named in the squad, but not included in a matchday squad.

=== Top scorers ===
The top ten try and point scorers during the 2018 Rugby Challenge were:

Top ten try scorers
No	Player	Team	Tries
1	Enver Brandt	Griquas	11
2	Ruwellyn Isbell	Pumas	9
2	Duncan Saal	Western Province	9
4	Marko Janse van Rensburg	Pumas	7
4	Charlie Mayeza	Boland Cavaliers	7
4	Kyle Steyn	Griquas	7
7	Tyler Fisher	SWD Eagles	6
7	Xolisa Guma	Blue Bulls XV	6
7	Tertius Kruger	Free State XV	6
7	Sergio Torrens	Boland Cavaliers	6
7	Jeremy Ward	Sharks XV	6

Top ten points scorers
No	Player	Team	Points
1	Chris Smith	Pumas	131
2	George Whitehead	Griquas	95
3	Leighton Eksteen	SWD Eagles	80
4	Earll Douwrie	Blue Bulls XV	79
5	Shaun Reynolds	Golden Lions XV	75
6	Joshua Stander	Western Province	74
7	Jaun Kotzé	Griffons	73
8	Garth April	Sharks XV	66
8	Elgar Watts	Boland Cavaliers	66
10	Schalk Hugo	Leopards	65

== Referees ==
The following referees officiated matches in the 2018 Rugby Challenge:

2018 Rugby Challenge referees
Ben Crouse • Stephan Geldenhuys • Quinton Immelman • AJ Jacobs • Cwengile Jadezweni • Ruhan Meiring • Paul Mente • Vusi Msibi • Jaco Pretorius • Rasta Rasivhenge • Archie Sehlako • Ricus van der Hoven

== See also ==
- 2018 Currie Cup Premier Division
- 2018 Currie Cup First Division
