= Bhasera =

Bhasera is a surname. Notable people with the surname include:

- Michael Dixon Bhasera, Zimbabwean Roman Catholic prelate
- Onismor Bhasera, Zimbabwean footballer
- Stephen Bhasera, Zimbabwean rugby union player
