= Marko Janse van Rensburg =

South African rugby union player

- Full name: Marko Louis Janse van Rensburg
- Born: 1 October 1991 (age 35) Vanderbijlpark, South Africa
- Height: 1.81 m (5 ft 11 1/2 in)
- Weight: 109 kg (240 lb; 17 st 2 lb)
- School: Vredenburg High School, Vredenburg
- University: University of Stellenbosch

Rugby union career
- Position: Hooker
- Current team: Cheetahs / Free State Cheetahs
Senior career
Years	Team	Apps	(Points)
2013	Boland Cavaliers	4	(0)
2017–2021	Pumas	49	(70)
2020	Lions	0	(0)
2021–2022	Rugby ATL	29	(90)
2022–	Cheetahs		
2023–	Free State Cheetahs		
- Correct as of 25 September 2022

Marko Louis Janse van Rensburg (born 1 October 1991) is a South African rugby union player for the Pumas in the Currie Cup and the Rugby Challenge. His regular position is hooker. He also plays for Rugby ATL of Major League Rugby (MLR).

He was a member of the Pumas squad that won the 2018 Rugby Challenge, featuring in all eleven of their matches.
