= Alandré van Rooyen =

South African rugby union player

- Born: 23 August 1996 (age 30) Port Elizabeth, South Africa
- Height: 1.81 m (5 ft 11 1/2 in)
- Weight: 105 kg (231 lb; 16 st 7 lb)
- School: Nico Malan High School
- University: University of Pretoria

Rugby union career
- Position: Hooker
- Current team: London Irish
Youth career
- 2013–2014: Eastern Province
- 2015–2017: Blue Bulls
Senior career
Years	Team	Apps	(Points)
2016	Blue Bulls	6	(5)
2017	Blue Bulls XV	7	(0)
2017–2020	Southern Kings	34	(5)
2018	Eastern Province Elephants	2	(10)
2020–2022	Griquas	14	(5)
2022	London Irish		
- Correct as of 15 February 2022

Alandré van Rooyen (born 23 August 1996) is a South African rugby union player for the Southern Kings in the Pro14. His regular position is hooker.

== Rugby career ==
=== Schoolboy rugby ===
Van Rooyen was born in Port Elizabeth and represented his local Eastern Province province at the 2013 Academy Week and 2014 Craven Week tournaments. Represented Eastern Province at the u18 Provincial Sevens tournament in 2013.

=== Blue Bulls ===
After school, he joined the Pretoria-based Blue Bulls academy. He progressed through the various age-groups, representing them at Under-19 level in 2015 and Under-21 level in 2016 and 2017.

In 2016, he made his first class debut, coming on as a replacement for the Blue Bulls XV against the Sharks XV in the Currie Cup qualification series. He made two more appearances off the bench — scoring his debut try in the second of those in a 28–23 victory over the SWD Eagles — before being named in the starting lineup for the first time for their match against the Boland Cavaliers, and also started their final two matches of the competition.

Van Rooyen once again played for the Blue Bulls XV in 2017, this time in the newly-launched Rugby Challenge competition, making seven appearances.

=== Southern Kings ===
In August 2017, Van Rooyen returned to his hometown as he was one of several players loaned from the Blue Bulls to the Southern Kings as they looked to build a squad for their inaugural season in the expanded Pro14 competition. He made his debut in that competition in the team's 30–34 defeat to Welsh side Scarlets, and also appeared against Edinburgh the following week and against Munster in their match in George.

Van Rooyen was also loaned to the Eastern Province Elephants for a part of their 2018 Rugby Challenge campaign, starting their first two matches of the season against Western Province and SWD Eagles, scoring a try in each of those matches.
