= Herschel Jantjies =

South African rugby union player

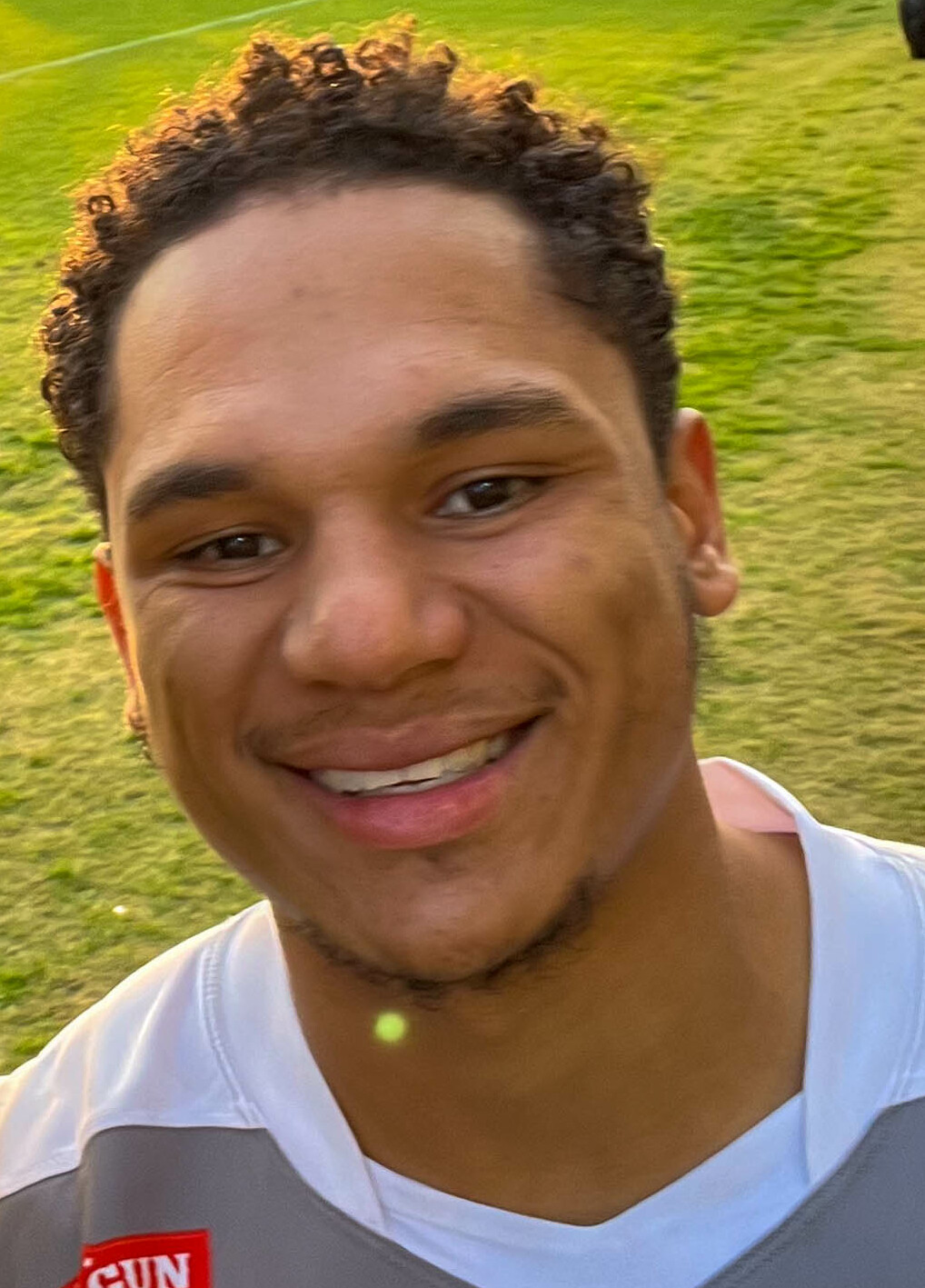
- Jantjies in 2023
- Full name: Herschel Jerome Jantjies
- Born: 22 April 1996 (age 30) Kylemore, South Africa
- Height: 1.66 m (5 ft 5 1/2 in)
- Weight: 74 kg (163 lb; 11 st 9 lb)
- School: Paul Roos Gymnasium
- University: University of the Western Cape

Rugby union career
- Position: Scrum-half
- Current team: Bayonne
Youth career
- 2012–2017: Western Province
Senior career
Years	Team	Apps	(Points)
2016–	Western Province	26	(25)
2017	Scarlets	1	(0)
2018–2025	Stormers	98	(105)
2025–	Bayonne	21	(15)
- Correct as of 18 October 2016
International career
Years	Team	Apps	(Points)
2019–	South Africa	26	(30)
- Correct as of 27 September 2026
Medal record
Men's Rugby union
Representing South Africa
Rugby World Cup
Gold medal – first place	2019 Japan	Squad

Herschel Jerome Jantjies (born 22 April 1996) is a South African professional rugby union player for Bayonne in the Top 14 and the South Africa national team . His regular position is scrum-half.

== Rugby career ==
Jantjies was born in Stellenbosch, where he attended Paul Roos Gymnasium. He represented Western Province at Under-16 level in 2012 and at the Craven Week tournaments in 2013 and 2014. He progressed to their Under-19 and Under-21 sides, and made his first class debut in Western Province's match against the Leopards in the 2016 Currie Cup qualification series.

He made four appearances as a replacement for Western Province in the 2017 Rugby Challenge, a competition they would go on to win, before reverting to the Western Province U21 team for the latter half of the season. At the end of 2017, Jantjies was drafted into the squad of Welsh side Scarlets on their visit to South Africa during the 2017–18 Pro14 season, and came on as a replacement in their match against the Cheetahs in Bloemfontein.

He played in all nine of their matches in the 2018 Rugby Challenge, scoring his first and second tries in first class rugby in a 23–21 victory over the Boland Cavaliers in their Round Three match. He scored a further try in their match against the Border Bulldogs as his side progressed to the quarterfinal stage before being eliminated by Free State XV.

Schoolboy rugby kicked off at his hometown of Kylemore where he attended P.C Petersen Primary from where he graduated to his high schooling career which initially started at Kylemore High School where his excellence was spotted. His constant game-changing performances got the interest from Paul Roos Gymnasium in Stellenbosch, where he started playing under 14 rugby for the D team. His size counted against him, but once he got game time, he grabbed the opportunity with both hands. At the age of 14, he undertook his first trip overseas where he represented a South African invitational side on a postseason rugby tour to Scotland in the UK. Jantjies' rugby master brain scored his constant features at WP Grant Komo and Craven week and constant 1st team starts for Paul Roos in the South African Premiere Schools league.

Jantjies was included in the Stormers' squad for their final match of the 2018 Super Rugby season against the Sharks, and he came on as a second half replacement to make his Super Rugby debut.

== International rugby ==
In July 2019, Jantjies made his debut for South Africa in their opening match of the 2019 Rugby Championship against Australia in Johannesburg, scoring twice in a 35–17 win. In their next match against New Zealand in Wellington, Jantjies scored his side's only try in the 79th minute to help them to a 16–16 draw for a total of 3 tries in his first 2 games.

Jantjies was named in South Africa's squad for the 2019 Rugby World Cup. South Africa went on to win the tournament, defeating England in the final.

== Statistics ==
=== Test match record ===
As of 27 September 2026

Opponent	P	W	D	L	Try	Pts	%Won
Argentina	2	2	0	0	0	0	100
Australia	4	1	0	3	2	10	25
British & Irish Lions	3	2	0	1	0	0	66.67
Canada	1	1	0	0	0	0	100
England	2	1	0	1	0	0	50
Georgia	1	1	0	0	1	5	100
Italy	1	1	0	0	0	0	100
Japan	2	2	0	0	1	5	100
Namibia	1	1	0	0	0	0	100
New Zealand	5	1	1	3	1	5	20
Scotland	1	1	0	0	0	0	100
Wales	3	3	0	0	1	5	100
Total	26	17	1	8	6	30	65.38

Pld = Games played, W = Games won, D = Games drawn, L = Games lost, Try = Tries scored, Pts = Points scored

=== International tries ===
As of 18 July 2026

Try	Opposing team	Location	Venue	Competition	Date	Result	Score
1	Australia	Johannesburg, South Africa	Ellis Park Stadium	2019 Rugby Championship	20 July 2019	Win	35–17
2	Australia	Johannesburg, South Africa	Ellis Park Stadium	2019 Rugby Championship	20 July 2019	Win	35–17
3	New Zealand	Wellington, New Zealand	Wellington Regional Stadium	2019 Rugby Championship	27 July 2019	Tie	16–16
4	Japan	Kumagaya, Japan	Kumagaya Rugby Ground	2019 Rugby World Cup warm-up matches	6 September 2019	Win	7–41
5	Georgia	Pretoria, South Africa	Loftus Versfeld Stadium	Test match	2 July 2021	Win	40–9
6	Wales	Durban, South Africa	Kings Park Stadium	2026 Nations Championship	18 July 2026	Win	43–0
