= HP Swart =

South African rugby union player

- Full name: Henro-Pierre Swart
- Born: 17 March 1989 (age 37) Port Elizabeth, South Africa
- Height: 1.89 m (6 ft 2 1/2 in)
- Weight: 113 kg (249 lb; 17 st 11 lb)
- School: Hoërskool Framesby, Port Elizabeth
- University: North-West University, Potchefstroom

Rugby union career
- Position: Flanker / Number eight
- Current team: Leopards
Youth career
- 2009: Griquas
- 2010: Leopards
Amateur team(s)
Years	Team	Apps	(Points)
2011–2014	NWU Pukke	13	(20)
Senior career
Years	Team	Apps	(Points)
2012–present	Leopards	71	(65)
2013–2015	Leopards XV	7	(10)
- Correct as of 27 March 2022

Henro-Pierre Swart (born 17 March 1989) is a professional South African rugby union player, currently playing with the Leopards. His regular position is flanker or number eight.

== Career ==
=== Youth and Varsity Cup rugby ===
Swart attended Hoërskool Framesby in Port Elizabeth, playing first team cricket as well as rugby alongside future provincial rugby players like Cameron Jacobs, Juan Language and Rhyk Welgemoed.

In 2009, Swart moved to Kimberley, Northern Cape, where he was a member the Griquas U21 side that played in the 2009 Under-21 Provincial Championship. The following year, he made the move to Potchefstroom and represented the Leopards U21 side in the 2010 edition of the same competition.

He played Varsity Cup rugby for Potchefstroom-based university side NWU Pukke between 2012 and 2014, making thirteen appearances over the three seasons.

=== Leopards ===
Swart made his first class debut during the 2012 Vodacom Cup competition, being named in the run-on side for their home clash against the Golden Lions and helping his side to a 23–16 victory. He made a total of four starts during the competition and also scored his first senior try in the last of those appearances, against former side Griquas in a narrow 42–40 defeat.

He returned to the side for the 2013 Vodacom Cup competition and once again made four appearances (playing off the bench in three of those matches) and scored a try in his final match of the competition, this time a 29–28 defeat at home against the Pumas. He was retained for their 2013 Currie Cup First Division campaign and made his Currie Cup debut in their match against the Falcons. He made nine appearances, which included six consecutive starts and scored his first Currie Cup try in their match against the Border Bulldogs in East London.

He was a regular member of their Currie Cup side in 2014, playing five times in the 2014 Currie Cup qualification tournament, where the Leopards lost out on qualification to the 2014 Currie Cup Premier Division by a single point to Griquas. He appeared in all six their matches in the 2014 Currie Cup First Division, scoring tries against the Griffons and against the Falcons to help his side finish top of the log, only to surprisingly get knocked out by the Falcons in the semi-finals.
