= P. W. Steenkamp =

Namibia international rugby union player

PW Steenkamp
- Full name: Pieter Willem Steenkamp
- Born: 11 December 1997 (age 28) Mariental, Namibia
- Height: 1.75 m (5 ft 9 in)
- Weight: 76 kg (168 lb; 12 st 0 lb)
- School: Privaatskool Elnatan

Rugby union career
- Position: Fly-half / Fullback
- Current team: Orkan Sochaczew
Senior career
| Years | Team | Apps | (Points) |
| 2017–2019 | Welwitschias | 7 | (58) |
| 2021- | Orkan Sochaczew | 38 | (566) |
- Correct as of 22 June 2023
International career
| Years | Team | Apps | (Points) |
| 2018– | Namibia | 9 | (14) |
- Correct as of 16 November 2018

Pieter Willem Steenkamp (born 11 December 1997) is a Namibian rugby union player for the Namibian national team and for Orkan Sochaczew in the Ektraliga . His regular position is fly-half or fullback.

== Rugby career ==
Steenkamp was born in Mariental. He made his test debut for Namibia in 2018 against Uganda and represented the Welwitschias in the South African domestic Currie Cup and Rugby Challenge since 2017.

In 2021 he joined polish side Orkan Sochaczew.
