= Stephen Bhasera =

Zimbabwean rugby union player (born 1996)

- Full name: Stephen Courtney Makanaka Bhasera
- Born: 31 January 1996 (age 30) Harare, Zimbabwe
- Height: 1.80 m (5 ft 11 in)
- Weight: 108 kg (238 lb; 17 st 0 lb)
- School: Falcon College
- University: University of Johannesburg

Rugby union career
- Position: Prop
- Current team: Golden Lions / Golden Lions XV
Youth career
- 2015–2017: Golden Lions
Senior career
Years	Team	Apps	(Points)
2018–present	Golden Lions XV	4	(5)
2018–present	Golden Lions	2	(0)
- Correct as of 28 October 2018
International career
Years	Team	Apps	(Points)
2009	Zimbabwe Under-13		
2012	Zimbabwe Under-16		
2013–2014	Zimbabwe Under-18		
- Correct as of 8 September 2018

Stephen Courtney Makanaka Bhasera (born 31 January 1996) is a Zimbabwean rugby union player playing in South Africa for the Golden Lions in the Currie Cup and the Golden Lions XV in the Rugby Challenge. His regular position is prop.

After representing Zimbabwe a record four times at Craven Week, Bhasera earned a full scholarship to study at the University of Johannesburg, where he earned his LLB. He considered Tendai Mtawarira a hero.
