= 2014 Varsity Shield =

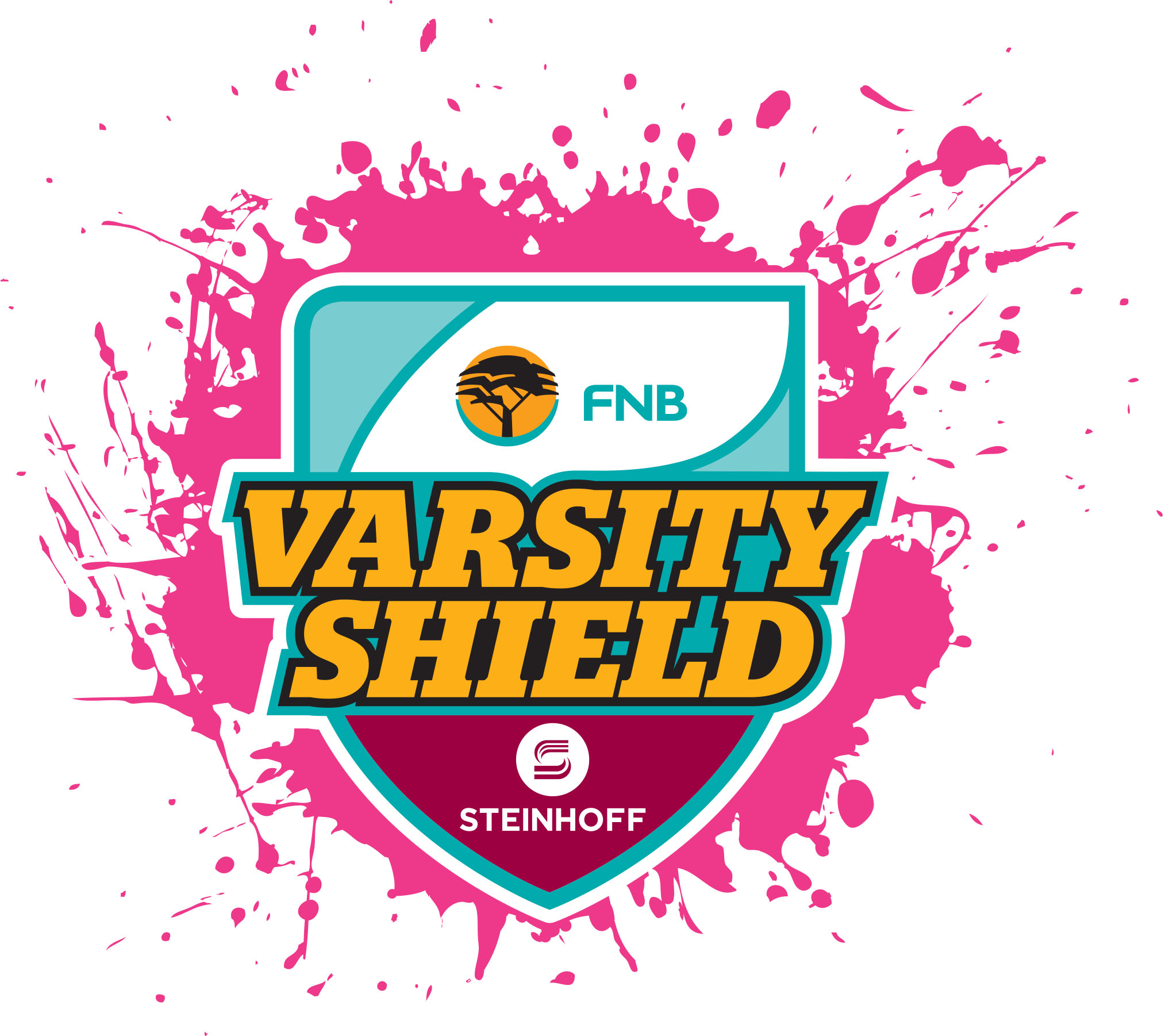
- Countries: South Africa
- Date: 27 January – 31 March 2014
- Champions: CUT Ixias (3rd title)
- Runners-up: UKZN Impi
- Promoted: CUT Ixias
- Relegated: None
- Matches played: 21
- Tries scored: 146 (average 7 per match)
- Top point scorer: Duan Pretorius (88)
- Top try scorer: Shayne Makombe (6)

The 2014 Varsity Shield was contested from 27 January to 31 March 2014. The tournament (also known as the FNB Varsity Shield presented by Steinhoff International for sponsorship reasons) was the fourth season of the Varsity Shield, an annual second-tier inter-university rugby union competition featuring five South African universities.

The tournament was won by CUT Ixias for the second consecutive time and third time overall; they beat UKZN Impi 35–26 in the final played on 31 March 2015. CUT Ixias were automatically promoted to the top-tier Varsity Cup competition for 2015, but UKZN Impi lost their promotion play-off match against UJ to remain in the Varsity Shield for 2015. Bottom side TUT Vikings won their relegation play-off match against challengers NWU Vaal Triangle to also remain in the Varsity Shield for 2015.

== Rules ==
The Varsity Shield used a different scoring system to the regular system. Tries were worth five points as usual, but conversions were worth three points, while penalties and drop goals were only worth two points.

== Competition ==
There were five participating universities in the 2014 Varsity Shield. These teams played each other twice over the course of the season, once at home and once away.

Teams received four points for a win and two points for a draw. Bonus points were awarded to teams that scored four or more tries in a game, as well as to teams that lost a match by seven points or less. Teams were ranked by log points, then points difference (points scored less points conceded).

The top two teams qualified for the title play-offs. These teams played each other in the final, at the home venue of the higher-placed team.

The Varsity Shield winner was promoted to the 2015 Varsity Cup competition, while the bottom team in the Varsity Cup was relegated to the 2015 Varsity Shield. There was also a promotion/relegation match between the 7th-placed team in the Varsity Cup and the Varsity Shield runner-up at the end of the 2014 season.

== Teams ==
Location of teams in 2014 Varsity Shield

2014 Varsity Shield teams
Team name	University	Stadium
CUT Ixias	Central University of Technology	CUT Stadium, Bloemfontein
TUT Vikings	Tshwane University of Technology	TUT Stadium, Pretoria
UFH Blues	University of Fort Hare	Davidson Rugby Field, Alice
UKZN Impi	University of KwaZulu-Natal	Peter Booysen Sports Park, Pietermaritzburg
UKZN Impi	University of KwaZulu-Natal	Howard College Rugby Stadium, Durban
UWC	University of the Western Cape	UWC Sport Stadium, Cape Town

== Standings ==
The final league standings for the 2014 Varsity Shield were:

2014 Varsity Shield standings
Pos	Team	P	W	D	L	PF	PA	PD	TF	TA	TB	LB	Pts
1	CUT Ixias	8	6	0	2	255	171	+84	35	21	6	1	31
2	UKZN Impi	8	4	1	3	246	171	+75	31	21	4	3	25
3	UFH Blues	8	4	1	3	215	217	−2	27	28	4	0	22
4	UWC	8	3	0	5	199	240	−41	24	29	3	1	16
5	TUT Vikings	8	2	0	6	184	300	−116	23	41	3	2	13

Legend and competition rules
Legend:
Top two teams; qualify to final.	P = Games played, W = Games won, D = Games drawn, L = Games lost, PF = Points for, PA = Points against, PD = Points difference, TF = Tries for, TA = Tries against, TB = Try bonus points, LB = Losing bonus points, Pts = Log points
Bottom team; qualify to the relegation play-offs.	P = Games played, W = Games won, D = Games drawn, L = Games lost, PF = Points for, PA = Points against, PD = Points difference, TF = Tries for, TA = Tries against, TB = Try bonus points, LB = Losing bonus points, Pts = Log points
Competition rules:
Play-offs: The top two teams will qualify to the final, with the higher-placed team having home advantage. The winner of the final will automatically be promoted, while the runner-up will qualify to the promotion play-off against the seventh-ranked Varsity Cup team. The bottom team will qualify to the relegation play-off against a team outside of the Varsity Rugby structure. Points breakdown: * 4 points for a win * 2 points for a draw * 1 bonus point for a loss by seven points or less * 1 bonus point for scoring four or more tries in a match

=== Round-by-round ===
Team Progression – 2014 Varsity Shield
Team	R1	R2	R3	R4	R5	R6	R7	R8	R9	R10	Final
CUT Ixias	4 (2nd)	4 (3rd)	9 (2nd)	14 (1st)	16 (1st)	21 (1st)	26 (1st)	31 (1st)	31 (1st)	31 (1st)	Won
UKZN Impi	1 (3rd)	2 (5th)	2 (5th)	7 (3rd)	12 (2nd)	14 (2nd)	15 (2nd)	15 (2nd)	20 (2nd)	25 (2nd)	Lost
UFH Blues	0 (5th)	4 (4th)	5 (4th)	5 (5th)	10 (3rd)	12 (3rd)	12 (3rd)	12 (4th)	17 (3rd)	22 (3rd)	—N/a
UWC	4 (1st)	6 (1st)	6 (3rd)	6 (4th)	6 (5th)	6 (5th)	11 (4th)	15 (3rd)	16 (4th)	16	—N/a
TUT Vikings	0 (4th)	5 (2nd)	10 (1st)	10 (2nd)	10 (4th)	10 (4th)	10 (5th)	11 (5th)	11 (5th)	13 (5th)	—N/a
The table above shows a team's progression throughout the season. For each round, their cumulative points total is shown with the overall log position in brackets.
Key:	win	draw	loss	bye							

== Fixtures ==
The 2014 Varsity Shield fixtures were as follows:

- All times are South African (GMT+2).

=== Round one ===
27 January 2014	CUT Ixias	26–25	UKZN Impi	CUT Stadium, Bloemfontein
16:45	Try: Noël Marx 36'; Danie van der Merwe 65'; Johan van Schalkwyk 71'; Con: Noël Marx 37', 66', 72' (3/3); Pen: Noël Marx 5' (1/2); Duan Pretorius (0/1)	Scoreboard; Report	Try: Kabous van Schalkwyk 7'; Shayne Makombe 49', 80'; Con: Brendan Cope 8', 50' (2/3); Pen: Brendan Cope 19', 46' (2/2); Drop: Brendan Cope (0/1); Cards: Deon Carney (yellow card) 28' to 38'	Referee: Jaco Kotze

27 January 2014	UFH Blues	8–26	UWC	Davidson Rugby Field, Alice
19:00	Try: Oliver Zono 48'; Con: Oliver Zono 49' (1/1); Cards: Siyabulela Sijula (yellow card) 70' to 80'; Onke Dubase (yellow card) 76'	Scoreboard; Report	Try: Kenwinn Wiener 9'; James Verity-Amm 71'; José Julies 77'; Con: Freddie Muller 10' (1/3); Pen: Freddie Muller 40', 45', 52', 75' (4/4)	Referee: Lusanda Jam

Bye/s: TUT Vikings

=== Round two ===
3 February 2014	UKZN Impi	12–17	UFH Blues	Howard College Rugby Stadium, Durban
19:00	Try: Lwazi Ngcungama 10'; Con: Brendan Cope 10' (1/1); Pen: Brendan Cope 1', 26' (2/2); Cards: Shayne Makombe (yellow card) 56'	Scoreboard; Report	Try: Oliver Zono 23'; Garth van Rayner 73'; Con: Oliver Zono 23' (1/2); Pen: Oliver Zono 20', 28' (2/5); Cards: Masixole David (yellow card) 8' to 18'	Referee: Archie Sehlako

3 February 2014	UWC	31–34	TUT Vikings	UWC Sport Stadium, Cape Town
19:00	Try: James Verity-Amm 14'; Dale van Schalkwyk 17'; Njabulo Ndlovu 28'; Kenwinn Wiener 71'; Con: Freddie Muller 15', 18', 71' (3/4); Pen: Freddie Muller 57' (1/2); Cards: Pallo Manuel (yellow card) 7' to 18'; Heinrich Marcus (yellow card) 63' to 73'	Scoreboard; Report	Try: Pieter Matthews 24'; Hamish Herd 37'; Juan Maritz 53'; Mandla Mdaka 68'; Con: Morné Hugo 25', 38', 54', 69' (4/4); Pen: Morné Hugo 60' (1/1); Cards: Isak Deetlefs (yellow card) 7' to 18'; Ralphton Minnaar (yellow card) 40' to 50'	Referee: Cwengile Jadezweni

Bye/s: CUT Ixias

=== Round three ===
10 February 2014	TUT Vikings	42–34	UFH Blues	TUT Stadium, Pretoria
19:00	Try: Adriaan Joubert; Brian Guillen; Curtly Brinkhuis; Deon Michael Joubert; Andries Truter; Con: Morné Hugo; Pen: Morné Hugo	Scoreboard; Report	Try: Lithabile Mgwadleka; Billy Dutton; Masixole David; Mzwandile Yalezo; Con: Oliver Zono; Pen: Oliver Zono	Referee: Gerrie de Bruin

10 February 2014	CUT Ixias	30–8	UWC	CUT Stadium, Bloemfontein
19:00	Try: Fanie Coetzer 41'; Deon Gouws 47'; Charlie Hitchcock 62'; Dean Kauprihanoff 65'; Con: Noël Marx 42', 63' (2/4); Pen: Noël Marx 9', 32' (2/3); Cards: Frans Sisita (yellow card) 40'; Marius Grobler (yellow card) 59'; Vincent Maruping (yellow card) 70'	Scoreboard; Report	Pen: Freddie Muller 1', 6', 28', 40' (4/5); Cards: Yondela Stampu (yellow card) 17'; Njabulo Ndlovu (yellow card) 35' to 47'	Attendance: 3,000; Referee: Jaco Pretorius

Bye/s: UKZN Impi

=== Round four ===
17 February 2014	UWC	24–33	UKZN Impi	UWC Sport Stadium, Cape Town
19:00	Try: Kelvin de Bruyn 43'; Melik Wana 77'; Njabulo Ndlovu 81'; Con: Freddie Muller 43', 77', 82' (3/3)	Scoreboard; Report	Try: Henri Boshoff 1'; Kabous van Schalkwyk 33'; Brandon Bailing 39'; Zwela Zondi 64'; Con: Brendan Cope 2', 34', 65' (3/4); Pen: Brendan Cope 75', 78' (2/2)	Referee: Oregopotse Rametsi

17 February 2014	TUT Vikings	18–39	CUT Ixias	TUT Stadium, Pretoria
19:00	Try: Barend Nordeje 58'; Pieter Matthews 68'; Hamish Herd 80'; Con: Morné Hugo 69' (1/3); Pen: Morné Hugo (0/1)	Scoreboard; Report	Try: Duan Pretorius 1', 41', 64'; Kholo Ramashala 28'; Frans Sisita 34'; Stephan Griesel 52'; Con: Noël Marx 29', 35', 42' (3/6); Cards: Len Noort (yellow card) 21' to 31'; Juan Hugo (yellow card) 67' to 77'	Referee: Archie Sehlako

Bye/s: UFH Blues

=== Round five ===
24 February 2014	CUT Ixias	29–31	UFH Blues	CUT Stadium, Bloemfontein
19:00	Try: Kholo Ramashala 8', 19'; Danie van der Merwe 50'; Heinrich Bitzi 70'; Con: Duan Pretorius 9', 20', 51' (3/4); Drop: Noël Marx (0/1); Fanie Coetzer (0/1)	Scoreboard; Report	Try: Billy Dutton 34'; Oliver Zono 44', 76'; Madoda Mbulelo Ludidi 73'; Con: Oliver Zono 45', 74', 77' (3/4); Pen: Oliver Zono 39' (1/2); Cards: Billy Dutton (yellow card) 65'	Attendance: 200; Referee: Jaco Kotze

24 February 2014	UKZN Impi	32–8	TUT Vikings	Peter Booysen Sports Park, Pietermaritzburg
19:00	Try: Kabous van Schalkwyk 5', 25'; Zwela Zondi 35'; Shayne Makombe 41'; Con: Brendan Cope 6' (1/1); Cameron Wright 25', 36', 42' (3/3)	Scoreboard; Report	Try: Pieter Matthews 44'; Con: Morné Hugo 45' (1/1); Cards: Andries Truter (yellow card) 18' to 28'	Referee: Stephan Geldenhuys

Bye/s: UWC

=== Round six ===
27 February 2014	UWC	24–35	CUT Ixias	UWC Sport Stadium, Cape Town
19:00	Try: Melik Wana 33'; Minenhle Mthethwa 40'; Pat O'Brien 46'; Con: Freddie Muller 34', 40', 47' (3/3); Pen: Freddie Muller (0/1); Cards: Matthew Faught (yellow card) 55' to 65'; Pallo Manuel (yellow card) 74'; Njabulo Ndlovu (yellow card) 75'	Scoreboard; Report	Try: Danie van der Merwe 4'; Charlie Hitchcock 7'; Duan Pretorius 62'; Fanie Coetzer 75'; Con: Duan Pretorius 8', 63', 76' (3/4); Pen: Duan Pretorius 22', 26', 42' (3/3); Cards: Vincent Maruping (yellow card) 45' to 55'	Referee: Quinton Immelman

27 February 2014	UFH Blues	18–18	UKZN Impi	Davidson Rugby Field, Alice
19:00	Try: Garth van Rayner; Con: Oliver Zono; Pen: Oliver Zono; Cards: Billy Dutton (yellow card); Siyabulela Sijula (yellow card)	Scoreboard; Report	Try: Rico Lategan; Lwazi Ngcungama; Con: Cameron Wright	Referee: Rodney Boneparte

Bye/s: TUT Vikings

=== Round seven ===
3 March 2014	CUT Ixias	47–8	TUT Vikings	CUT Stadium, Bloemfontein
19:00	Try: Moekoa Bolofo 3', 30'; Alec Mhlanga 7'; Danie van der Merwe 14'; Charlie Hitchcock 19'; Deon Gouws 73'; Frans Sisita 78'; Con: Duan Pretorius 4', 8', 20', 74' (4/7); Cards: Vincent Maruping (yellow card) 51' to 61'	Scoreboard; Report	Try: Gaybrin Smith 57'; Con: Morné Hugo 58' (1/1); Cards: Ewald Maré (yellow card) 46' to 56'; Isak Deetlefs (yellow card) 65' to 75'	Attendance: 2,000; Referee: Lourens van der Merwe

3 March 2014	UKZN Impi	32–33	UWC	Howard College Rugby Stadium, Durban
19:00	Try: Deon Carney 6'; Duncan Campbell 26'; Brandon Bailing 30'; Con: Duncan Campbell 7', 27', 31' (3/3); Cards: Johan Wagenaar (yellow card) 75'	Scoreboard; Report	Try: Tahriq Allan 19'; Dean Herbert 32'; Yondela Stampu 37', 76'; Con: Freddie Muller 20', 38', 77' (3/4); Pen: Freddie Muller 48', 69' (2/2)	Referee: Jaco Kotze

Bye/s: UFH Blues

=== Round eight ===
10 March 2014	TUT Vikings	17–24	UWC	TUT Stadium, Pretoria
19:00	Try: Isak Deetlefs penalty try Con: Morné Hugo; Pen: Morné Hugo; Drop: Morné Hugo	Scoreboard; Report	Try: Dean Herbert; Minenhle Mthethwa; Quaid Langeveldt; Con: Freddie Muller	Referee: Ben Crouse

10 March 2014	UFH Blues	18–28	CUT Ixias	Davidson Rugby Field, Alice
19:00	Try: Lundi Ralarala 41'; Onke Dubase 73'; Con: Sibabalwe Mtsulwana 42' (1/1); Andile Makinana 73' (1/1); Pen: Oliver Zono (0/2); Sibabalwe Mtsulwana 50' (1/1); Cards: Siyabulela Sijula (yellow card) 54' to 64'	Scoreboard; Report	Try: Danie van der Merwe 20'; Stephen Griesel 47'; Charlie Hitchcock 56'; Deon Gouws 70'; Con: Duan Pretorius 20', 48' (2/4); Pen: Duan Pretorius 33' (1/3)	Attendance: 2,200; Referee: Eduan Nel

Bye/s: UKZN Impi

=== Round nine ===
17 March 2014	UWC	29–51	UFH Blues	UWC Sport Stadium, Cape Town
19:00	Try: Quaid Langeveldt 13'; James Verity-Amm 19', 50'; Dean Herbert 63'; Con: Freddie Muller 14', 20', 51' (3/4)	Scoreboard; Report	Try: Oliver Zono 8'; Lundi Ralarala 32'; Ntyara Mkhafu 36'; Onke Dubase 40'; Lukhanyiso Komani 59'; Athenkosi Manentsa 72'; Lithabile Mgwadleka 78'; Con: Saneliso Ngoma 9', 33', 60', 79' (4/7); Pen: Saneliso Ngoma 2', 16' (2/2)	Referee: Francois Pretorius

17 March 2014	TUT Vikings	24–55	UKZN Impi	TUT Stadium, Pretoria
19:00	Try: Pieter Matthews 6'; Mandla Mdaka 17'; Gaybrin Smith 78'; Con: Morné Hugo 6', 18', 79' (3/3)	Scoreboard; Report	Try: Cameron Wright 3'; Shayne Makombe 8'; Kabous van Schalkwyk 20'; Lwazi Ngcungama 36', 50'; Brandon Bailing 64'; Deon Carney 70'; Yandisa Mdolomba 77'; Con: Duncan Campbell 4', 9', 37', 50' (4/6); Cameron Wright 77' (1/2)	Attendance: 1,000; Referee: Jaco Pretorius

Bye/s: CUT Ixias

=== Round ten ===
24 March 2014	UFH Blues	38–33	TUT Vikings	Davidson Rugby Field, Alice
19:00	Try: Lukhanyiso Komani 27'; Lithabile Mgwadleka 38'; Onke Dubase 44'; Masixole David 50'; Lundi Ralarala 66'; Con: Saneliso Ngoma (0/1); Bangi Kobese 45', 51', 67' (3/4); Pen: Bangi Kobese 73' (1/1); Saneliso Ngoma 20' (1/2)	Scoreboard; Report	Try: Gaybrin Smith 79', 6'; Andries Truter 32'; Adriaan Joubert 70'; Con: Morné Hugo 71', 7', 33' (3/4); Pen: Morné Hugo 42', 60' (2/2)	Attendance: 20,000; Referee: Cwengile Jadezweni

24 March 2014	UKZN Impi	39–21	CUT Ixias	Peter Booysen Sports Park, Pietermaritzburg
19:00	Try: Ado Wessels 2'; Rico Lategan 35'; Shayne Makombe 39'; Brandon Bailing 58', 64'; Con: Duncan Campbell 2', 36', 40', 59' (4/4); Pen: Duncan Campbell 19' (1/1)	Scoreboard; Report	Try: Johan van Schalkwyk 4', 13'; Deon Gouws 46'; Con: Duan Pretorius 14', 47' (2/3); Cards: Fanie Coetzer (yellow card) 32' to 42'	Referee: Oregopotse Rametsi

Bye/s: UWC

=== Final ===
31 March 2014	CUT Ixias	35–26	UKZN Impi	CUT Stadium, Bloemfontein
16:30	Try: Alec Mhlanga 9'; Duan Pretorius 13'; Stephen Griesel 63'; Fanie Coetzer 72'; Con: Duan Pretorius 14', 64', 73' (3/4); Pen: Duan Pretorius 47', 58' (2/3); Drop: Noël Marx 74' (1/1)	Report; Scoreboard	Try: Duncan Campbell 33'; Dean Muir 51'; Deon Carney 69'; Con: Duncan Campbell 34', 52', 70' (3/3); Pen: Duncan Campbell 60' (1/1)	Referee: Quinton Immelman

== Players ==
=== Player statistics ===
The following table contains points which have been scored in the 2014 Varsity Shield.

All point scorers
No	Player	Team	T	C	P	DG	Pts
1	Duan Pretorius	CUT Ixias	5	17	6	0	88
2	Freddie Muller	UWC	1	19	11	0	84
3	Morné Hugo	TUT Vikings	0	19	5	1	69
4	Oliver Zono	UFH Blues	5	9	8	0	68
5	Duncan Campbell	UKZN Impi	2	15	2	0	59
6	Noël Marx	CUT Ixias	1	8	3	1	37
7	Brendan Cope	UKZN Impi	0	7	6	0	33
8	Shayne Makombe	UKZN Impi	6	0	0	0	30
9	Lwazi Ngcungama	UKZN Impi	5	0	0	0	25
9	Danie van der Merwe	CUT Ixias	5	0	0	0	25
9	Kabous van Schalkwyk	UKZN Impi	5	0	0	0	25
12	Brandon Bailing	UKZN Impi	4	0	0	0	20
12	Deon Gouws	CUT Ixias	4	0	0	0	20
12	Charlie Hitchcock	CUT Ixias	4	0	0	0	20
12	Pieter Matthews	TUT Vikings	4	0	0	0	20
12	Gaybrin Smith	TUT Vikings	4	0	0	0	20
12	James Verity-Amm	UWC	4	0	0	0	20
12	Cameron Wright	UKZN Impi	1	5	0	0	20
19	Saneliso Ngoma	UFH Blues	0	4	3	0	18
20	Deon Carney	UKZN Impi	3	0	0	0	15
20	Fanie Coetzer	CUT Ixias	3	0	0	0	15
20	Onke Dubase	UFH Blues	3	0	0	0	15
20	Stephan Griesel	CUT Ixias	3	0	0	0	15
20	Lithabile Mgwadleka	UFH Blues	3	0	0	0	15
20	Minenhle Mthethwa	UWC	3	0	0	0	15
20	Kholo Ramashala	CUT Ixias	3	0	0	0	15
20	Lundi Ralarala	UFH Blues	3	0	0	0	15
20	Garth van Rayner	UFH Blues	3	0	0	0	15
20	Johan van Schalkwyk	CUT Ixias	3	0	0	0	15
30	Bangi Kobese	UFH Blues	0	3	1	0	11
31	Moekoa Bolofo	CUT Ixias	2	0	0	0	10
31	Masixole David	UFH Blues	2	0	0	0	10
31	Billy Dutton	UFH Blues	2	0	0	0	10
31	Dean Herbert	UWC	2	0	0	0	10
31	Hamish Herd	TUT Vikings	2	0	0	0	10
31	Adriaan Joubert	TUT Vikings	2	0	0	0	10
31	Lukhanyiso Komani	UFH Blues	2	0	0	0	10
31	Quaid Langeveldt	UWC	2	0	0	0	10
31	Rico Lategan	UKZN Impi	2	0	0	0	10
31	Mandla Mdaka	TUT Vikings	2	0	0	0	10
31	Alec Mhlanga	CUT Ixias	2	0	0	0	10
31	Njabulo Ndlovu	UWC	2	0	0	0	10
31	Frans Sisita	CUT Ixias	2	0	0	0	10
31	Yondela Stampu	UWC	2	0	0	0	10
31	Andries Truter	TUT Vikings	2	0	0	0	10
31	Melik Wana	UWC	2	0	0	0	10
31	Kenwinn Wiener	UWC	2	0	0	0	10
31	Zwela Zondi	UKZN Impi	2	0	0	0	10
49	Tahriq Allan	UWC	1	0	0	0	5
49	Henri Boshoff	UKZN Impi	1	0	0	0	5
49	Curtly Brinkhuis	TUT Vikings	1	0	0	0	5
49	Isak Deetlefs	TUT Vikings	1	0	0	0	5
49	Marius Grobler	CUT Ixias	1	0	0	0	5
49	Brian Guillen	TUT Vikings	1	0	0	0	5
49	Deon Michael Joubert	TUT Vikings	1	0	0	0	5
49	José Julies	UWC	1	0	0	0	5
49	Dean Kauprihanoff	CUT Ixias	1	0	0	0	5
49	Bart le Roux	UKZN Impi	1	0	0	0	5
49	Madoda Mbulelo Ludidi	UFH Blues	1	0	0	0	5
49	Athenkosi Manentsa	UFH Blues	1	0	0	0	5
49	Juan Maritz	TUT Vikings	1	0	0	0	5
49	Yandisa Mdolomba	UKZN Impi	1	0	0	0	5
49	Ntyara Mkhafu	UFH Blues	1	0	0	0	5
49	Sibabalwe Mtsulwana	UFH Blues	1	0	0	0	5
49	Dean Muir	UKZN Impi	1	0	0	0	5
49	Barend Nordeje	TUT Vikings	1	0	0	0	5
49	Pat O'Brien	UWC	1	0	0	0	5
49	Dale van Schalkwyk	UWC	1	0	0	0	5
49	Ado Wessels	UKZN Impi	1	0	0	0	5
49	Mzwandile Yalezo	UFH Blues	1	0	0	0	5
71	Andile Makinana	UFH Blues	0	1	0	0	3
* Legend: T = Tries, C = Conversions, P = Penalties, DG = Drop Goals, Pts = Points

=== Squad lists ===
The teams released the following squad lists:

CUT Ixias

Forwards

- Gerard Baard
- Moekoa Bolofo
- Fanie Coetzer
- Daniel de Jager
- Deon Gouws
- Johann Grundlingh
- Juan Hugo
- Dean Kauprihanoff
- Hanro Liebenberg
- Vincent Maruping
- Len Noort
- Lyvette Shikwambana
- Frans Sisita
- Theuns Truter
- Danie van der Merwe
- Ian van Wyk
- Jasper Wiese
- Did not play:
- Junior Burger
- Henko de Jager
- Carl Gersbach
- Boetie Maketla
- JJ Nel
- Kevin Pretorius
- Jean-Luke van Zyl

Backs

- Heinrich Bitzi
- Stephan Griesel
- Marius Grobler
- Charlie Hitchcock
- Noël Marx
- Alec Mhlanga
- Johan Nel
- Duan Pretorius
- Kholo Ramashala
- Mosego Toolo
- Johan van Schalkwyk
- Did not play:
- Hanro Pretorius
- Stephan Schutte
- Clinton Toua

Coach

- Skillie Bester

TUT Vikings

Forwards

- Ricardo Burger
- Isak Deetlefs
- Hamish Herd
- Claude Johannes
- Adriaan Joubert
- Ewald Maré
- Juan Maritz
- Armand Marshall
- Pieter Matthews
- Mandla Mdaka
- Barend Nordeje
- David Pieterse
- Werner Serfontein
- Ryan Sim
- Gerrit van Gerwe
- Did not play:
- Jan Arnoldus Els
- Wayne Short

Backs

- Leroy Afrika
- Curtly Brinkhuis
- Deon Fitchet
- Brian Guillen
- Morné Hugo
- Deon Michael Joubert
- Ralphton Minnaar
- Edwin Oliver
- Shane Pretorius
- Gaybrin Smith
- Andries Truter
- Did not play:
- Darrio Bezuidenhout
- Shawn Jaards
- Thabo Mangena
- Thabang Mathebula
- Paul Walters

tbc

- Did not play:
- Quintis Anton Janse van Vuuren
- Janco Muller
- Lindokuhle Sambo
- Diedrichdt Smit

Coach

- André Eloff

UFH Blues

Forwards

- Masixole David
- Onke Dubase
- Billy Dutton
- Madoda Mbulelo Ludidi
- Lwando Mabenge
- Athenkosi Manentsa
- Xola Mapapu
- Ntyara Mkhafu
- Thembelihle Mpapha
- Olwethu Mputla
- Angelo Timothy Nhlapo
- Luzuko Nyabaza
- Siyabulela Sijula
- Sibusiso Sityebi
- Sibabalwe Tshoni
- Mzwandile Yalezo
- Did not play:
- Litha Labase
- Lubabalo Elton Lento
- Zuko Lerula
- Lunga Innocent Nohlwati

Backs

- Bangi Kobese
- Lukhanyiso Komani
- Andile Makinana
- Lithabile Mgwadleka
- Sibabalwe Mtsulwana
- Saneliso Ngoma
- Lundi Ralarala
- Mkhululi Sonqishe
- Garth van Rayner
- Oliver Zono
- Did not play:
- Lungelo Kepe
- Curtis Kleinhans
- Lwando Makhongolo
- Anda Nanto
- Lutho Zatu

tbc

- Did not play:
- Busiwe Fani
- Six Maselwa

Coach

- Elliot Fana

UKZN Impi

Forwards

- Henri Boshoff
- Deon Carney
- Marco Hillebrand
- Michael Hutton
- Gideon Koegelenberg
- Sizwe Kubheka
- Bart le Roux
- Sanele Malwane
- Dean Muir
- Leon Mulder
- Lwazi Ngcungama
- Sabelo Tshabalala
- Kabous van Schalkwyk
- Johan Wagenaar
- Mikyle Webster
- Ado Wessels
- Zwela Zondi
- Did not play:
- Marné Coetzee
- André Greyvenstein
- Matthew Mandioma
- Richard Mhlongo
- Siya Mhlongo
- Luciando Santos

Backs

- Brandon Bailing
- Alrich Brown
- Duncan Campbell
- Brendan Cope
- Spa Dube
- Henkie Groenewald
- Rico Lategan
- Nelson Makhanye
- Shayne Makombe
- Kurt Mavrodaris
- Yandisa Mdolomba
- Garath Meikle
- Philip Molnar
- Gavin Nyawata
- Cameron Wright
- Did not play:
- Ncgebo Masikane
- Mondli Ntshingila
- Ruhan Smit
- Sandile Zulu

tbc

- Did not play:
- Lindo Radebe

Coach

- John Mitchell

UWC

Forwards

- Mogamat Adams
- Tahriq Allan
- Siphiwo Bakeni
- Brandon Beukman
- Samuel Borsah
- Kelvin de Bruyn
- Matthew Faught
- Philbrey Joseph
- José Julies
- Timothy Louw
- Darren Luiters
- Pallo Manuel
- Sebenza Maphumulo
- Heinrich Marcus
- Michael Mkhize
- Njabulo Ndlovu
- Adeeb October
- Pat O'Brien
- William Scott
- Did not play:
- Curtis Beukes
- Oswin Mentoor

Backs

- Dumisani Dyonase
- Dean Herbert
- Keanu Langeveldt
- Quaid Langeveldt
- Minenhle Mthethwa
- Freddie Muller
- Matthew Nortjé
- Warrick Rhoda
- Yondela Stampu
- Dale van Schalkwyk
- James Verity-Amm
- Melik Wana
- Kenwinn Wiener
- Rufus Witbooi
- Did not play:
- Charlton Afrika
- Daniel Bock
- Lubabalo Faleni
- Justin McKay
- Cleo Voster

Coach

- Peter de Villiers

== Honours ==
2014 FNB Varsity Shield Champions:	CUT Ixias
Player That Rocks:	Onke Dubase, UFH Blues
Forward That Rocks:	Lwazi Nqcungama, UKZN Impi
Back That Rocks:	Shayne Makombe, UKZN Impi
Top Try Scorers:	Shayne Makombe, UKZN Impi (6)
Top Points Scorer:	Duan Pretorius, CUT Ixias (88)

== Referees ==
The following referees officiated matches in the 2014 Varsity Shield:

- Rodney Boneparte
- Ben Crouse
- Gerrie de Bruin
- Stephan Geldenhuys
- Quinton Immelman
- Cwengile Jadezweni
- Lusanda Jam
- Jaco Kotze
- Eduan Nel
- Francois Pretorius
- Jaco Pretorius
- Oregopotse Rametsi
- Archie Sehlako
- Lourens van der Merwe

== See also ==
- Varsity Rugby
- 2014 Varsity Rugby
- 2014 Varsity Cup
- 2014 SARU Community Cup
- 2014 Vodacom Cup
