= 2018 Sharks (rugby union) season =

Sharks
- 2018 season
- Head coach: Robert du Preez
- Captain: Ruan Botha
- Stadium: Growthpoint Kings Park, Durban / Jonsson Kings Park, Durban
- Overall: 8th
- South African Conference: 3rd
- Record: Won 7, Drew 1, Lost 8 Lost in Quarterfinals
- Top try scorer: All: Lukhanyo Am and Robert du Preez (5)
- Top points scorer: All: Robert du Preez (215)
Home colours	Away colours	Third colours

In 2018, the Sharks participated in the 2018 Super Rugby competition, the 23rd edition of the competition since its inception in 1996. They were included in the South African Conference of the competition, along with the Bulls, Jaguares, Lions and Stormers.

The Sharks won seven, drew one and lost eight of their matches during the regular season of the competition to finish third in the South African Conference, and in 8th place overall to qualify for the finals as a wildcard team. They lost in their qualifier match to the Crusaders.

== Personnel ==
=== Squad ===
The following players were named in the Sharks squad for the 2018 Super Rugby season:

2018 Sharks squad
Player	Position/s	Date of birth (age)	Super Rugby		Sharks	
Player	Position/s	Date of birth (age)	Apps	Pts	Apps	Pts
(South Africa) Lukhanyo Am	Centre	28 November 1993 (aged 24)	25	15	15	10
(South Africa) Hyron Andrews	Lock	6 July 1995 (aged 22)	10	0	10	0
(South Africa) Garth April	Fly-half	16 July 1991 (aged 26)	20	97	20	97
(South Africa) Tristan Blewett	Centre	26 August 1996 (aged 21)	0	0	0	0
(South Africa) Curwin Bosch	Fly-half	25 June 1997 (aged 20)	16	156	16	156
(South Africa) Ruan Botha	Lock	10 January 1992 (aged 26)	42	10	16	5
(South Africa) Michael Claassens	Scrum-half	28 October 1982 (aged 35)	58	5	29	5
(South Africa) Keegan Daniel	Loose forward	5 March 1985 (aged 32)	117	80	117	80
(Namibia) Johan Deysel	Centre	26 September 1991 (aged 26)	4	5	4	5
(South Africa) Jean Droste	Lock	21 January 1994 (aged 24)	3	0	3	0
(South Africa) Dan du Preez	Loose forward	5 August 1995 (aged 22)	26	25	26	25
(South Africa) Jean-Luc du Preez	Loose forward	5 August 1995 (aged 22)	27	15	27	15
(South Africa) Robert du Preez	Fly-half	30 July 1993 (aged 24)	14	107	0	0
(South Africa) Thomas du Toit	Prop	5 May 1995 (aged 22)	36	20	36	20
(South Africa) André Esterhuizen	Centre	30 March 1994 (aged 23)	40	15	40	15
(South Africa) Ross Geldenhuys	Prop	19 April 1983 (aged 34)	52	0	0	0
(South Africa) Gideon Koegelenberg	Lock	25 November 1994 (aged 23)	0	0	0	0
(South Africa) Stephan Lewies	Lock	27 January 1992 (aged 26)	51	5	51	5
(South Africa) Marius Louw	Centre	24 October 1995 (aged 22)	1	0	1	0
(South Africa) Mzamo Majola	Prop	20 February 1995 (aged 22)	4	0	0	0
(South Africa) Makazole Mapimpi	Wing	26 July 1990 (aged 27)	14	55	0	0
(South Africa) Franco Marais	Hooker	23 September 1992 (aged 25)	34	0	34	0
(South Africa) Khutha Mchunu	Prop	1 July 1997 (aged 20)	0	0	0	0
(South Africa) John-Hubert Meyer	Prop	19 September 1993 (aged 24)	2	0	2	0
(South Africa) Tendai Mtawarira	Prop	1 August 1985 (aged 32)	136	25	136	25
(South Africa) Tera Mtembu	Loose forward	9 December 1990 (aged 27)	40	15	40	15
(South Africa) Lwazi Mvovo	Wing	3 June 1986 (aged 31)	112	170	112	170
(South Africa) S'busiso Nkosi	Wing	21 January 1996 (aged 22)	7	15	7	15
(South Africa) Coenie Oosthuizen	Prop	22 March 1989 (aged 28)	102	50	28	10
(South Africa) Tyler Paul	Loose forward	20 January 1995 (aged 23)	15	5	0	0
(South Africa) Chiliboy Ralepelle	Hooker	11 September 1986 (aged 31)	93	30	24	10
(South Africa) Juan Schoeman	Prop	18 September 1991 (aged 26)	10	0	10	0
(South Africa) Louis Schreuder	Scrum-half	25 April 1990 (aged 27)	80	15	0	0
(South Africa) Rhyno Smith	Fullback	11 February 1993 (aged 25)	8	0	8	0
(South Africa) Akker van der Merwe	Hooker	17 June 1991 (aged 26)	49	35	0	0
(South Africa) Philip van der Walt	Loose forward	14 July 1989 (aged 28)	73	30	24	5
(South Africa) Kerron van Vuuren	Hooker	23 May 1995 (aged 22)	0	0	0	0
(South Africa) Kobus van Wyk	Wing	22 January 1992 (aged 26)	43	80	13	35
(South Africa) Jacques Vermeulen	Loose forward	8 February 1995 (aged 23)	8	0	8	0
(South Africa) Wian Vosloo	Loose forward	15 February 1995 (aged 23)	0	0	0	0
(South Africa) Jeremy Ward	Centre	10 January 1996 (aged 22)	15	5	13	5
(South Africa) Grant Williams	Scrum-half	22 July 1996 (aged 21)	0	0	0	0
(South Africa) Courtney Winnaar	Fullback	27 March 1997 (aged 20)	0	0	0	0
(South Africa) Cameron Wright	Scrum-half	20 April 1994 (aged 23)	1	0	1	0
(South Africa) Leolin Zas	Wing	20 October 1995 (aged 22)	15	40	0	0
Note: Players' ages and statistics are correct as of 17 February 2018, the date of the opening round of the competition.

== Standings ==
2018 Super Rugby standings
Pos	Team	Pld	W	D	L	PF	PA	PD	TF	TA	TB	LB	Pts	Qualification
1	Crusaders (C)	16	14	0	2	542	295	+247	77	39	7	0	63	Quarter-finals (Conference leaders)
2	Lions	16	9	0	7	519	435	+84	77	55	6	4	46	Quarter-finals (Conference leaders)
3	Waratahs	16	9	1	6	557	445	+112	74	59	4	2	44	Quarter-finals (Conference leaders)
4	Hurricanes	16	11	0	5	474	343	+131	66	43	5	2	51	Quarter-finals (Wildcard)
5	Chiefs	16	11	0	5	463	368	+95	60	48	3	2	49	Quarter-finals (Wildcard)
6	Highlanders	16	10	0	6	437	445	−8	59	57	3	1	44	Quarter-finals (Wildcard)
7	Jaguares	16	9	0	7	409	418	−9	51	55	2	0	38	Quarter-finals (Wildcard)
8	Sharks	16	7	1	8	437	442	−5	49	57	2	4	36	Quarter-finals (Wildcard)
9	Rebels	16	7	0	9	440	461	−21	57	60	5	3	36	
10	Brumbies	16	7	0	9	393	422	−29	56	52	2	4	34	
11	Stormers	16	6	0	10	390	423	−33	46	56	0	5	29	
12	Bulls	16	6	0	10	441	502	−61	59	66	2	3	29	
13	Reds	16	6	0	10	389	501	−112	49	66	1	3	28	
14	Blues	16	4	0	12	378	509	−131	50	66	2	4	22	
15	Sunwolves	16	3	0	13	404	664	−260	48	99	0	2	14	

Source: Super Rugby

=== Round-by-round ===
The table below shows the Sharks' progression throughout the season. For each round, their cumulative points total is shown with the overall log position:

Team	R1	R2	R3	R4	R5	R6	R7	R8	R9	R10	R11	R12	R13	R14	R15	R16	R17	R18	R19	QF	SF	Final
Opposition	LIO	Bye	WAR	SUN	BRU	REB	BLU	HUR	BUL	STO	Bye	HIG	BUL	CHI	JAG	Bye	LIO	STO	JAG	CRU	—	—
Cumulative Points	1	1	3	8	9	9	13	14	14	18	18	23	24	28	28	28	32	32	36	Lost	—	—
Position (overall)	5th	11th	12th	7th	9th	10th	10th	9th	10th	9th	11th	8th	10th	8th	9th	9th	9th	9th	8th		—	—
Position (SA Conf.)	3rd	4th	4th	2nd	3rd	3rd	3rd	2nd	3rd	3rd	5th	3rd	4th	3rd	3rd	3rd	3rd	3rd	3rd		—	—
Key:	win	draw	loss	bye																		

== Matches ==
The Sharks played the following matches during the 2018 Super Rugby season:

17 February 2018	Lions	26–19	Sharks	Emirates Airline Park, Johannesburg
17:15	Try: Lionel Mapoe 17', 52'; Aphiwe Dyantyi 22'; Kwagga Smith 59'; Con: Elton Jantjies 18', 24', 53'	Report; Scoreboard	Try: Robert du Preez 8'; S'busiso Nkosi 42'; Makazole Mapimpi 55'; Con: Robert du Preez 9', 56'	Referee: Glen Jackson

3 March 2018	Sharks	24–24	Waratahs	Kings Park Stadium, Durban
15:05	Try: Lukhanyo Am 18', 46'; Robert du Preez 71'; Con: Robert du Preez 19', 47', 72'; Pen: Robert du Preez 12'	Report; Scoreboard	Try: Jake Gordon 4'; Michael Hooper 56'; Mitch Short 76'; Con: Bernard Foley 6', 57', 78'; Pen: Bernard Foley 31'	Referee: Jaco Peyper

10 March 2018	Sharks	50–22	Sunwolves	Kings Park Stadium, Durban
15:05	Try: Makazole Mapimpi 9', 49'; Akker van der Merwe 29'; Tera Mtembu 36'; Jacques Vermeulen 55'; S'busiso Nkosi 68'; Cameron Wright 75'; Con: Robert du Preez 10', 30', 37', 56', 69'; Curwin Bosch 76'; Pen: Robert du Preez 2'	Report; Scoreboard	Try: Lomano Lemeki 45'; Wimpie van der Walt 59'; Will Tupou 78'; Con: Kotaro Matsushima 61'; Ryoto Nakamura 79'; Pen: Harumichi Tatekawa 25'	Referee: Federico Anselmi

17 March 2018	Brumbies	24–17	Sharks	GIO Stadium, Canberra
19:45	Try: Lausii Taliauli 18'; Henry Speight 47'; Con: Wharenui Hawera 19'; Pen: Wharenui Hawera 7', 62', 65', 72'; Cards: Lachlan McCaffrey (yellow card) 36' to 46'; Allan Alaalatoa (yellow card) 53' to 63'	Report; Scoreboard	Try: Thomas du Toit 57'; Curwin Bosch 77'; Con: Robert du Preez 58', 78'; Pen: Robert du Preez 31'	Referee: Glen Jackson

23 March 2018	Rebels	46–14	Sharks	AAMI Park, Melbourne
19:45	Try: Anaru Rangi 11'; Amanaki Mafi 38'; Will Genia 56'; Bill Meakes 64'; Ross Haylett-Petty 68'; Fereti Sa'aga 80'; Con: Reece Hodge 12'; Jack Debreczeni 57', 64', 69', 80'; Pen: Reece Hodge 2'; Jack Debreczeni 45'; Cards: Jack Maddocks (yellow card) 72'	Report; Scoreboard	Try: Lwazi Mvovo 28'; Marius Louw 78'; Con: Robert du Preez 30'; Curwin Bosch 78'; Cards: Curwin Bosch (yellow card) 18' to 28'	Referee: Shuhei Kubo

31 March 2018	Blues	40–63	Sharks	Eden Park, Auckland
19:35	Try: Michael Collins 22'; Akira Ioane 45'; Patrick Tuipulotu 51'; Stephen Perofeta 53'; Rieko Ioane 75'; George Moala 80'; Con: Stephen Perofeta 23', 46', 52', 53'; Bryn Gatland 76'; Cards: Jordan Trainor (yellow card) 65' to 75'	Report; Scoreboard	Try: Ruan Botha 11'; Jean-Luc du Preez 34'; Tera Mtembu 57'; Robert du Preez 60'; Kobus van Wyk 72'; Curwin Bosch 80'; Con: Robert du Preez 11', 34', 58', 61', 72', 80'; Pen: Robert du Preez 4', 16', 26', 39', 64', 70', 78'; Cards: S'busiso Nkosi (yellow card) 44' to 54'	Referee: Nick Briant

6 April 2018	Hurricanes	38–37	Sharks	McLean Park, Napier
19:35	Try: Jordie Barrett 8'; Ngani Laumape 16', 80'; Vince Aso 31'; Con: Ihaia West 18', 32', 80'; Pen: Ihaia West 45', 51', 72', 78'	Scoreboard	Try: Lukhanyo Am 21', 36'; Louis Schreuder 25'; Tyler Paul 73'; Con: Robert du Preez 22', 26', 37', 75'; Pen: Robert du Preez 5', 34', 55'; Cards: Franco Marais (yellow card) 80'	Referee: Nic Berry

14 April 2018	Sharks	10–40	Bulls	Kings Park Stadium, Durban
17:15	Try: André Esterhuizen 39'; Con: Robert du Preez 40'; Pen: Robert du Preez 3'; Cards: Thomas du Toit (yellow card) 48' to 58'	Report; Scoreboard	Try: Warrick Gelant 5', 8', 78'; Adriaan Strauss 25' penalty try 47'; Johnny Kôtze 80'; Con: Handré Pollard 6', 10', 26'; Manie Libbok 79'	Referee: Egon Seconds

21 April 2018	Sharks	24–17	Stormers	Kings Park Stadium, Durban
17:15	Try: Lukhanyo Am 42'; Jean-Luc du Preez 64'; Thomas du Toit 73'; Con: Robert du Preez 43', 65', 74'; Pen: Robert du Preez 19'	Report; Scoreboard	Try: Raymond Rhule 39'; Ramone Samuels 52'; Con: Damian Willemse 40', 53'; Pen: Damian Willemse 50'; Cards: Dewaldt Duvenage (yellow card) 59' to 69'	Referee: Glen Jackson

5 May 2018	Sharks	38–12	Highlanders	Kings Park Stadium, Durban
17:15	Try: Akker van der Merwe 1'; Makazole Mapimpi 7'; Dan du Preez 45'; S'busiso Nkosi 62'; Robert du Preez 68'; Con: Robert du Preez 2', 9', 46', 63', 68'; Pen: Robert du Preez 33'	Report; Scoreboard	Try: Dillon Hunt 27'; Teihorangi Walden 74'; Con: Lima Sopoaga 29'	Referee: Marius van der Westhuizen

12 May 2018	Bulls	39–33	Sharks	Loftus Versfeld, Pretoria
17:15	Try: Warrick Gelant 11'; Jesse Kriel 15'; Roelof Smit 27'; Johnny Kôtze 54'; Lood de Jager 65'; Con: Handré Pollard 16', 27', 55', 67'; Pen: Handré Pollard 38', 69'; Cards: RG Snyman (yellow card) 34' to 44'	Report; Scoreboard	Try: Curwin Bosch 23'; Jacques Vermeulen 34'; Jean-Luc du Preez 70'; Con: Robert du Preez 23', 35', 71'; Pen: Curwin Bosch 40'; Robert du Preez 46', 52', 80'; Cards: Curwin Bosch (yellow card) 10' to 20'; Lukhanyo Am (yellow card) 69' to 79'	Referee: Rasta Rasivhenge

19 May 2018	Sharks	28–24	Chiefs	Kings Park Stadium, Durban
15:05	Try: Robert du Preez 10'; Lwazi Mvovo 42'; Cameron Wright 58'; Con: Robert du Preez 11', 58'; Pen: Robert du Preez 5', 51', 67'	Report; Scoreboard	Try: Tyler Ardron 18'; Charlie Ngatai 47'; Solomon Alaimalo 80'; Con: Marty McKenzie 19', 48', 80'; Pen: Marty McKenzie 37'	Referee: Mike Fraser

25 May 2018	Jaguares	29–13	Sharks	José Amalfitani Stadium, Buenos Aires
16:40	Try: Ramiro Moyano 29', 32', 80'; Bautista Delguy 71'; Con: Nicolás Sánchez 30', 34', 72'; Pen: Nicolás Sánchez 13'	Report; Scoreboard	Try: Ruan Botha 40'; Con: Robert du Preez 40'; Pen: Robert du Preez 50', 54'; Cards: Ruan Botha (red card) 74'	Referee: Paul Williams

30 June 2018	Sharks	31–24	Lions	Kings Park Stadium, Durban
17:15	Try: Dan du Preez 3'; André Esterhuizen 59'; Lwazi Mvovo 68'; Con: Robert du Preez 59', 70'; Pen: Robert du Preez 13', 39', 63', 73'	Report; Scoreboard	Try: Ruan Combrinck 8'; Cyle Brink 17'; Kwagga Smith 40'; Con: Elton Jantjies 9', 18', 40'; Pen: Elton Jantjies 65'	Referee: Jaco Peyper

7 July 2018	Stormers	27–16	Sharks	DHL Newlands, Cape Town
17:15	Try: Cobus Wiese 7'; EW Viljoen 30'; Raymond Rhule 37'; Con: Joshua Stander 7', 31', 38'; Pen: Joshua Stander 66', 79'	Report; Scoreboard	Try: Kobus van Wyk 43'; Con: Robert du Preez 44'; Pen: Robert du Preez 5', 10', 19'	Referee: Jaco Peyper

14 July 2018	Sharks	20–10	Jaguares	Kings Park Stadium, Durban
17:15	Try: Akker van der Merwe 22'; Kobus van Wyk 53'; Con: Robert du Preez 23', 53'; Pen: Robert du Preez 9', 16'; Cards: Dan du Preez (yellow card) 19' to 29'	Report; Scoreboard	Try: Sebastián Cancelliere 66'; Con: Joaquín Díaz Bonilla 67'; Pen: Joaquín Díaz Bonilla 20'	Referee: Rasta Rasivhenge

Qualifier	21 July 2018	Crusaders	40–10	Sharks	AMI Stadium, Christchurch
	19:35	Try: Bryn Hall 9'; David Havili 12'; Matt Todd 42'; Braydon Ennor 67'; Pete Samu 72'; Con: Richie Mo'unga 43', 68', 73'; Pen: Richie Mo'unga 7', 40', 57'	Report; Scoreboard	Try: Kobus van Wyk 26'; Con: Robert du Preez 27'; Pen: Robert du Preez 48'	Referee: Mike Fraser

== Player statistics ==
The Super Rugby appearance record for players that represented the Sharks in 2018 is as follows:

2018 Sharks player statistics
Player name	LIO	WAR	SUN	BRU	REB	BLU	HUR	BUL	STO	HIG	BUL	CHI	JAG	LIO	STO	JAG	CRU	SF	F	App	Try	Con	Pen	DG	Pts
Juan Schoeman	1	17 (substituted in)	17 (substituted in)	1	17 (substituted in)	17 (substituted in)	17 (substituted in)	1	1	17 (substituted in)	17 (substituted in)	17 (substituted in)	17 (substituted in)	17 (substituted in)	1	17 (substituted in)	17 (substituted in)	—	—	17	0	0	0	0	0
Franco Marais	2	2			16 (substituted in)	16 (substituted in)	16 (substituted in)			16 (substituted in)		16 (substituted in)	16 (substituted in)					—	—	8	0	0	0	0	0
Thomas du Toit	3	3		3	3	3	3	3	3	3	3	3	3	3	3	3	3	—	—	16	2	0	0	0	10
Ruan Botha	4	4	4	4	4	4	4	4	5	5	5	5	5	5	5	5	5	—	—	17	2	0	0	0	10
Stephan Lewies	5	5	5	5	5	5	5	5		19 (substituted in)	19 (substituted in)	19 (substituted in)	19 (substituted in)					—	—	12	0	0	0	0	0
Philip van der Walt	6					6	6	6	6	6		6	6	6	6	6	6	—	—	12	0	0	0	0	0
Jacques Vermeulen	7	6	7	7	6				20 (substituted in)	20 (substituted in)	6	20 (substituted in)	20 (substituted in)	20 (substituted in)	7	7	7	—	—	14	2	0	0	0	10
Dan du Preez	8							20 (substituted in)	8	8	8	8	8	8	8	8	8	—	—	11	2	0	0	0	10
Cameron Wright	9	21 (substituted in)	21 (substituted in)	21 (substituted in)	21 (substituted in)	21 (substituted in)	21 (substituted in)	21 (substituted in)	9	9	9	21 (substituted in)	21 (substituted in)	9	21 (substituted in)	21 (substituted in)	21 (substituted in)	—	—	17	2	0	0	0	10
Robert du Preez	10	10	10	10	10	10	10	10	10	10	10	10	10	10	10	10	10	—	—	17	5	44	34	0	215
Makazole Mapimpi	11		11	11					11	11	11	23 (substituted in)	23 (substituted in)	11		23	23 (substituted in)	—	—	10	4	0	0	0	20
André Esterhuizen	12	12	12	12		12	12	12	12	12	12	12	12	12	12	12	12	—	—	16	2	0	0	0	10
Lukhanyo Am	13	13	13	13	13	13	13	13	13	13	13	13	13	13	13	13	13	—	—	17	5	0	0	0	25
S'busiso Nkosi	14	11	14		14	14	14	14	14	14	14	14	14		14			—	—	13	3	0	0	0	15
Lwazi Mvovo	15	15	23 (substituted in)	23 (substituted in)	11	11	11	11	23 (substituted in)	23 (substituted in)	23 (substituted in)	11	11	14	11	11	11	—	—	17	3	0	0	0	15
Akker van der Merwe	16 (substituted in)	16 (substituted in)	2	2	2			16 (substituted in)	16 (substituted in)	2	2	2	2	2	2	2	2	—	—	15	3	0	0	0	15
Tendai Mtawarira	17 (substituted in)	1	1		1	1	1			1	1	1	1	1	17 (substituted in)	1	1	—	—	14	0	0	0	0	0
John-Hubert Meyer	18 (substituted in)	18 (substituted in)	3	18 (substituted in)	18 (substituted in)	18 (substituted in)	18 (substituted in)	18 (substituted in)							18 (substituted in)	18 (substituted in)	18 (substituted in)	—	—	11	0	0	0	0	0
Hyron Andrews	19 (substituted in)	19 (substituted in)			19 (substituted in)	19 (substituted in)	19 (substituted in)		19 (substituted in)					19 (substituted in)	19 (substituted in)	19 (substituted in)	19 (substituted in)	—	—	10	0	0	0	0	0
Tyler Paul	20 (substituted in)	7		19 (substituted in)		20 (substituted in)	20 (substituted in)	19 (substituted in)	4	4	4	4	4	4	4	4	4	—	—	15	1	0	0	0	5
Grant Williams	21 (substituted in)																	—	—	1	0	0	0	0	0
Curwin Bosch	22 (substituted in)	23 (substituted in)	15	15	15	15	15	15	15	15	15	15	15	15	15	15	15	—	—	17	3	2	1	0	22
Kobus van Wyk	23 (substituted in)	14		14	22 (substituted in)	23 (substituted in)	23 (substituted in)	23 (substituted in)						23 (substituted in)	23 (substituted in)	14	14	—	—	11	4	0	0	0	20
Keegan Daniel		8	20 (substituted in)															—	—	2	0	0	0	0	0
Louis Schreuder		9	9	9	9	9	9	9	21 (substituted in)	21 (substituted in)	21 (substituted in)	9	9	21 (substituted in)	9	9	9	—	—	16	1	0	0	0	5
Tera Mtembu		20 (substituted in)	8	8	8	8	8	8										—	—	7	2	0	0	0	10
Marius Louw		22 (substituted in)	22 (substituted in)	22 (substituted in)	12	22 (substituted in)	22 (substituted in)	22 (substituted in)	22 (substituted in)	22 (substituted in)	22 (substituted in)	22 (substituted in)	22 (substituted in)	22 (substituted in)	22 (substituted in)	22 (substituted in)	22 (substituted in)	—	—	16	1	0	0	0	5
Wian Vosloo			6	6	20 (substituted in)						20 (substituted in)				20 (substituted in)	20	20 (substituted in)	—	—	6	0	0	0	0	0
Chiliboy Ralepelle			16 (substituted in)	16 (substituted in)		2	2	2	2		16 (substituted in)			16 (substituted in)	16 (substituted in)	16 (substituted in)	16 (substituted in)	—	—	11	0	0	0	0	0
Ross Geldenhuys			18 (substituted in)						18	18 (substituted in)	18 (substituted in)	18 (substituted in)	18 (substituted in)	18				—	—	5	0	0	0	0	0
Gideon Koegelenberg			19 (substituted in)															—	—	1	0	0	0	0	0
Mzamo Majola				17 (substituted in)				17	17									—	—	1	0	0	0	0	0
Jean-Luc du Preez				20 (substituted in)	7	7	7	7	7	7	7	7	7	7				—	—	11	3	0	0	0	15
Garth April					23 (substituted in)													—	—	1	0	0	0	0	0
Total																				17	50	46	35	0	447

(c) denotes the team captain. For each match, the player's squad number is shown. Starting players are numbered 1 to 15, while the replacements are numbered 16 to 22. If a replacement made an appearance in the match, it is indicated by (substituted in) . "App" refers to the number of appearances made by the player, "Try" to the number of tries scored by the player, "Kck" to the number of points scored via kicks (conversions, penalties or drop goals) and "Pts" refer to the total number of points scored by the player.

- Tristan Blewett, Michael Claassens, Johan Deysel, Jean Droste, Khutha Mchunu, Coenie Oosthuizen, Rhyno Smith, Kerron van Vuuren, Jeremy Ward, Courtney Winnaar and Leolin Zas did not make any appearances.

== See also ==
- Sharks
- 2018 Super Rugby season
