= Danie van der Merwe =

South African rugby union player

- Danie playing 99th cap.jpg
- Full name: Daniel Joubert van der Merwe
- Born: 24 January 1989 (age 37) Frankfort, South Africa
- Height: 1.84 m (6 ft 1/2 in)
- Weight: 120 kg (18 st 13 lb; 265 lb)
- School: Hoërskool Wilgerivier, Frankfort
- University: University of Johannesburg / Central University of Technology
- Notable relative: [Fanie van der Merwe]

Rugby union career
- Position: Prop
Youth career
- 2005–2007: Griffons
- 2008–2010: Golden Lions
Amateur team(s)
Years	Team	Apps	(Points)
2011–2014	CUT Ixias	27	(45)
Senior career
Years	Team	Apps	(Points)
2010	Golden Lions XV	1	(0)
2012–2018	Griffons	99	(100)
- Correct as of 27 October 2018

Daniel Joubert van der Merwe (born 24 January 1989 in Frankfort, South Africa) is a South African rugby union player who last played for the Griffons. His regular position is prop.

== Career ==
=== Youth ===
Van der Merwe was selected to represent his local provincial side, the Griffons at the Under-16 Grant Khomo Week tournament in 2005 and at the Under-18 Craven Week tournaments in both 2006 and 2007. He also represented the Griffons U19 in the 2007 Under-19 Provincial Championship.

=== Golden Lions ===
In 2008, Van der Merwe moved to Johannesburg, where he joined the Golden Lions. He represented the Golden Lions U19s in the 2008 Under-19 Provincial Championship and the Golden Lions U21s in the Under-21 Provincial Championships in 2009 and 2010.

In 2010, he was also included in the Golden Lions' squad for the 2010 Vodacom Cup. He made his first class debut for the Lions in their match against Van der Merwe's former side, the Griffons, coming on as a second-half substitute to help them to a 48–16 victory in Welkom.

=== CUT Ixias and Griffons ===
Van der Merwe moved back to the Free State in 2011 to enroll at the Central University of Technology in Bloemfontein. He played Varsity Rugby for their side, the CUT Ixias, in the inaugural Varsity Shield competition. CUT eventually won the competition, beating Wits 25–18 in the final. However, they failed to win promotion to the 2012 Varsity Cup competition, losing 43–50 to TUT Vikings after extra time in the promotion play-off match.

He made nine appearances for CUT in the 2012 Varsity Shield competition – scoring tries against Wits and UFH Blues during the regular season as CUT once again finished top of the log. However, despite Van der Merwe scoring his third try of the campaign in the final against Wits, they lost the match 17–19 to remain in the Varsity Shield competition for another two years.

Van der Merwe's performances didn't go unnoticed and he was included in the Griffons squad for the 2012 Vodacom Cup at the conclusion of the Varsity Shield. He made his debut for the Griffons in their Round Six match against the Falcons and had an extraordinary start to his Griffons career, scoring the opening try of the match in the first minute to help them to a 38–33 victory, their only win of the season. He also scored a try in his second appearance for the Griffons, a late consolation in a 28–50 defeat to the Blue Bulls in their final match of the regular season. He made his Currie Cup debut during the 2012 Currie Cup First Division season, making a single substitute appearance in a 13–20 defeat to the SWD Eagles in George.

He was once again a key player for the CUT Ixias during the 2013 Varsity Shield, playing in all nine of their matches during the competition as they won the competition for the second time in three seasons. He also scored one try against TUT Vikings. At the conclusion of the season, he again joined the Griffons for the conclusion of the 2013 Vodacom Cup competition, where he made three appearances. He established himself as the Griffons first-choice tighthead prop during the 2013 Currie Cup First Division, starting ten matches and coming on as a replacement in a further two matches. The Griffons finished in sixth place, missing out on a semi-final berth.

A dominant 2014 Varsity Shield season with CUT Ixias followed, as the side won all nine matches during the competition. Van der Merwe had a very productive season, scoring five tries in his side's run to help them earn promotion to the 2015 Varsity Cup. Two starts for the Griffons followed in the 2014 Vodacom Cup and he then started in all six of their matches during the 2014 Currie Cup qualification tournament as they finished in third position to qualify to the 2014 Currie Cup First Division. Van der Merwe also scored his first try in the Currie Cup competition in a 24–43 defeat to eventual winners Griquas. He made three appearances in the regular season of the First Division to help the Griffons finish in second spot in the competition. He played off the bench in their 45–43 semi-final victory against the SWD Eagles, as well as the final, where he helped the Griffons to a 23–21 victory against the Falcons, to win their first trophy for six years.
