= Billy Dutton =

South African rugby union player

- Born: 9 June 1989 (age 37) East London, South Africa
- Height: 1.90 m (6 ft 3 in)
- Weight: 105 kg (231 lb; 16 st 7 lb)
- School: Cambridge High School, East London
- University: Damelin, University of Fort Hare

Rugby union career
- Position: Loose forward / Lock
- Current team: Eastern Province Elephants
Youth career
- 2009–2010: Border Bulldogs
Amateur team(s)
Years	Team	Apps	(Points)
2011–2014	UFH Blues	16	(5)
2015	Old Selbornians	3	(5)
Senior career
Years	Team	Apps	(Points)
2010–2011	Border Bulldogs	3	(0)
2015–2021	Border Bulldogs	63	(50)
2022–	Eastern Province Elephants		
- Correct as of 29 March 2022

Billy Dutton (born 9 June 1989) is a South African rugby union player, currently playing with the Border Bulldogs. He is a utility forward that can play as a lock, flanker or number eight.

== Playing career ==
Dutton joined the Border Bulldogs academy after high school and he played for the Border U21 side in the 2009 Provincial Championship, where he made six appearances.

In 2010, Dutton was also included in the Border Bulldogs squad for the 2010 Vodacom Cup and made his first class debut on 26 February 2010, playing off the bench in an 8–69 defeat to a Sharks XV in Durban in their opening match of the season. He again played at Under-21 level in 2010, making five appearances and scoring a try in a match against the Pumas U21s.

Dutton made a further two first class appearances for the Border Bulldogs during the 2011 Vodacom Cup competition, coming on as a replacement in matches against the Griffons and the Pumas. 2011 also saw the launch of a second-tier competition to the Varsity Cup, called the Varsity Shield. Dutton represented the UFH Blues in this competition between 2011 and 2014, also captaining the side during the 2013 season.

In 2015, Dutton represented amateur club side Old Selbornians in the 2015 SARU Community Cup, scoring a try against defending champions and eventual runners-up Rustenburg Impala. He was recalled to the Border Bulldogs shortly after the conclusion of the SARU Community Cup and – after a four-year absence – returned to provincial rugby, making five appearances for his side in the 2015 Vodacom Cup, which included an appearance off the bench in their only victory of the competition, when they beat the Boland Cavaliers 29–5. He was retained in the squad for the Border Bulldogs' 2015 Currie Cup qualification campaign and – after being an unused replacement in their 20–13 victory over eventual champions Griquas – made his Currie Cup debut in their match against the Griffons in Welkom. He made one more appearance in the competition in their match against the Leopards as Border, by virtue of finishing in sixth position, qualified for the 2015 Currie Cup First Division. Dutton firmly established himself in the squad during that competition, starting all five of their matches in the number eight shirt. However, his side had another poor season, losing their first four matches before bouncing back to beat the Boland Cavaliers 44–20 in their final match of the season.

At the start of 2016, Dutton was one of six Border Bulldogs players that joined the Southern Kings' Super Rugby squad for a trial period as they prepared for the 2016 Super Rugby season. However, he returned to Border Bulldogs after he failed to be contracted for the Super Rugby side.

=== Statistics ===
First class career
Season	Teams	Currie Cup First Division		Currie Cup qualification		Vodacom Cup		Total	
Season	Teams	Apps	Pts	Apps	Pts	Apps	Pts	Apps	Pts
2010	Border Bulldogs	—	—	—	—	1	0	1	0
2011	Border Bulldogs	—	—	—	—	2	0	2	0
2015	Border Bulldogs	5	0	2	0	5	0	12	0
2010–2015	Border Bulldogs Total	5	0	2	0	8	0	15	0
2010–2015	Career Total	5	0	2	0	8	0	15	0
