= Pat O'Brien (rugby union) =

South African rugby union player

- Full name: Patrick Lloyd O'Brien
- Born: 25 December 1989 (age 36) Durban, South Africa
- Height: 1.90 m (6 ft 3 in)
- Weight: 110 kg (17 st 5 lb; 243 lb)
- School: Paul Roos Gymnasium, Stellenbosch
- University: University of Stellenbosch, Varsity College

Rugby union career
- Position: Lock / flanker
- Current team: Boland Cavaliers
Amateur team(s)
| Years | Team | Apps | (Points) |
| 2014 | UWC | 4 | (5) |
Senior career
| Years | Team | Apps | (Points) |
| 2013 | Griquas | 9 | (0) |
| 2014 | Western Province | 1 | (0) |
| 2015 | Pumas | 0 | (0) |
| 2019–present | Boland Cavaliers | 7 | (10) |
- Correct as of 1 July 2019

Patrick Lloyd O'Brien (born 25 December 1989 in Durban) is a South African rugby union player for the Boland Cavaliers in the Currie Cup and the Rugby Challenge. His regular position is lock or flanker. Great club and amateur performances have led to his Western Province sevens and Currie Cup debuts. He has since moved on to take up a provincial contract in Italy.

== Career ==
O'Brien played club rugby at Western Province club sides Helderberg and Villager before being included in Western Province's wider training group prior to the 2013 Currie Cup Premier Division. He failed to make an appearance for them, but joined Kimberley-based side Griquas for that competition. He made his first class debut against near-neighbours the Free State Cheetahs and made his first start a week later against the Golden Lions.

In total, he made nine appearances for Griquas in 2013, seven in the Currie Cup Premier Division and two in the post-season promotion/relegation series against the Pumas.

In 2014, he returned to Cape Town to play for UWC in the 2014 Varsity Shield competition, scoring one try in his four starts for the side.

He moved to Nelspruit to join the Pumas for the 2015 season.
