= Onke Dubase =

South African rugby union player

- Full name: Onke Sydwell Dubase
- Born: 6 August 1989 (age 37) East London, South Africa
- Height: 1.80 m (5 ft 11 in)
- Weight: 94 kg (207 lb; 14 st 11 lb)
- School: Hudson Park High School
- University: Damelin / University of Fort Hare

Rugby union career
- Position: Flanker
- Current team: Border Bulldogs
Youth career
- 2009–2010: Border Bulldogs
Amateur team(s)
Years	Team	Apps	(Points)
2012–2014	UFH Blues	18	(20)
Senior career
Years	Team	Apps	(Points)
2010–2011	Border Bulldogs	19	(15)
2014–present	Border Bulldogs	67	(50)
- Correct as of 27 March 2022

Onke Sydwell Dubase (born 6 August 1989) is a South African rugby union player, currently playing with the Border Bulldogs in domestic Currie Cup rugby. His regular position is flanker.

== Career ==
=== Youth ===
Dubase was included in the Border U21 team for the 2009 and 2010 Under-21 Provincial Championships.

=== Border Bulldogs and UFH Blues ===
Dubase made his first class debut for the Border Bulldogs during the 2010 Currie Cup First Division competition, coming on as a substitute in their match against the Falcons in Kempton Park for his only appearance.

Dubase played the whole 2011 Vodacom Cup competition, playing in all eight matches. He scored his first senior try in their match against the Falcons in East London and contributed another in the final match of the competition, a 52–19 defeat to the Golden Lions. Ten appearances followed in the 2011 Currie Cup First Division competition, with Dubase scoring his first Currie Cup try in their match against the Griffons.

Dubase didn't play any provincial rugby in 2012 and 2013, but did participate in the Varsity Shield for Alice-based university side UFH Blues from 2011 to 2014. He scored three tries in the 2014 Varsity Shield competition as UFH had their best season in the competition by finishing third. His performances earned him a recall to the Border Bulldogs side and he started three matches towards the end of the 2014 Vodacom Cup campaign. He was also included in their squad for the 2014 Currie Cup qualification tournament.

At the start of 2016, Dubase was one of six Border Bulldogs players that joined the Southern Kings' Super Rugby squad for a trial period as they prepared for the 2016 Super Rugby season. However, he returned to Border Bulldogs after he failed to be contracted for the Super Rugby side.
