= 2015 Varsity Shield =

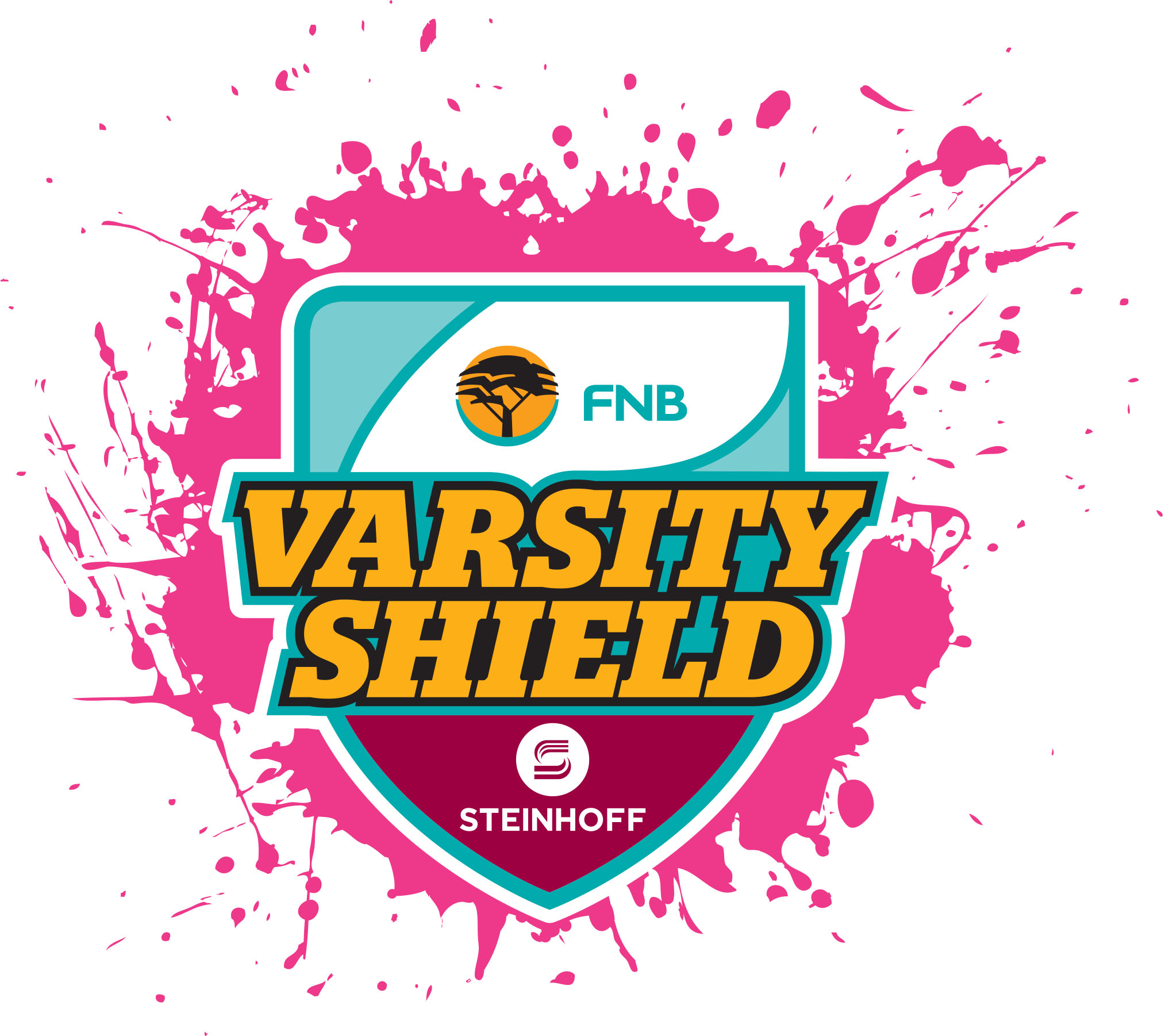
- Countries: South Africa
- Date: 2 February – 6 April 2015
- Champions: UKZN Impi (1st title)
- Runners-up: Wits
- Promoted: None
- Matches played: 21
- Tries scored: 173 (average 8.2 per match)
- Top point scorer: Brandan Hewitt (133)
- Top try scorer: James Verity-Amm (11)

The 2015 Varsity Shield was contested from 2 February to 6 April 2015. The tournament (also known as the FNB Varsity Shield presented by Steinhoff International for sponsorship reasons) was the fifth season of the Varsity Shield, an annual second-tier inter-university rugby union competition featuring five South African universities.

The tournament was won by UKZN Impi for the first time; they beat Wits 29–24 in the final played on 6 April 2015. No team was promoted to the top-tier Varsity Cup competition for 2016.

== Competition rules and information ==
There were five participating universities in the 2015 Varsity Shield. These teams played each other twice over the course of the season, once at home and once away.

Teams received four points for a win and two points for a draw. Bonus points were awarded to teams that scored four or more tries in a game, as well as to teams that lost a match by seven points or less. Teams were ranked by log points, then points difference (points scored less points conceded).

The top two teams qualified for the title play-offs. The team that finished first had home advantage against the team that finished second.

There was no promotion/relegation between the Varsity Cup and the Varsity Shield at the end of 2015.

The 2015 Varsity Shield used a different scoring system than the common scoring system. Tries were worth five points as usual, but conversions were worth three points instead of two, while penalties and drop goals were only worth two points instead of three.

== Teams ==
Location of teams in the 2015 Varsity Shield

The following teams took part in the 2015 Varsity Shield competition:

2015 Varsity Shield teams
Team name	University	Stadium
TUT Vikings	Tshwane University of Technology	TUT Stadium, Pretoria
UFH Blues	University of Fort Hare	Davidson Rugby Field, Alice
UKZN Impi	University of KwaZulu-Natal	Howard College Rugby Stadium, Durban
UKZN Impi	University of KwaZulu-Natal	Peter Booysen Sports Park, Pietermaritzburg
UWC	University of the Western Cape	UWC Sport Stadium, Cape Town
Wits	University of the Witwatersrand	Wits Rugby Stadium, Johannesburg

== Standings ==
The final league standings for the 2015 Varsity Shield were:

2015 Varsity Shield standings
Pos	Team	P	W	D	L	PF	PA	PD	TF	TA	TB	LB	Pts
1	Wits	8	6	2	0	407	162	+245	55	23	7	0	35
2	UKZN Impi	8	6	0	2	273	165	+108	39	23	4	0	28
3	UWC	8	4	2	2	259	165	+94	38	23	4	0	24
4	UFH Blues	8	1	0	7	124	341	–217	16	49	2	01	7
5	TUT Vikings	8	1	0	7	154	384	–230	23	53	2	1	7

Legend and competition rules
Legend:
Top two teams; qualify to final.	P = Games played, W = Games won, D = Games drawn, L = Games lost, PF = Points for, PA = Points against, PD = Points difference, TF = Tries for, TA = Tries against, TB = Try bonus points, LB = Losing bonus points, Pts = Log points
No relegation.	P = Games played, W = Games won, D = Games drawn, L = Games lost, PF = Points for, PA = Points against, PD = Points difference, TF = Tries for, TA = Tries against, TB = Try bonus points, LB = Losing bonus points, Pts = Log points
Competition rules:
Play-offs: The top two teams qualify to the final, with the higher-placed team having home advantage. Points breakdown: * 4 points for a win * 2 points for a draw * 1 bonus point for a loss by seven points or less * 1 bonus point for scoring four or more tries in a match

=== Round-by-round ===
The table below shows each team's progression throughout the season. For each round, their cumulative points total is shown with the overall log position in brackets:

Team Progression – 2015 Varsity Shield
Team	R1	R2	R3	R4	R5	R6	R7	R8	R9	R10	Final
Wits	0 (3rd)	5 (2nd)	10 (1st)	15 (1st)	18 (1st)	18 (1st)	23 (1st)	28 (1st)	33 (1st)	35 (1st)	Lost
UKZN Impi	4 (2nd)	9 (1st)	9 (2nd)	9 (2nd)	13 (2nd)	17 (2nd)	22 (2nd)	23 (2nd)	23 (2nd)	28 (2nd)	Won
UWC	0 (5th)	0 (4th)	4 (4th)	9 (3rd)	12 (3rd)	12 (3rd)	12 (3rd)	17 (3rd)	22 (3rd)	24 (3rd)	—N/a
UFH Blues	5 (1st)	5 (3rd)	5 (3rd)	6 (4th)	6 (4th)	11 (4th)	11 (4th)	11 (4th)	11 (4th)	11 (4th)	—N/a
TUT Vikings	0 (3rd)	0 (5th)	1 (5th)	2 (5th)	2 (5th)	2 (5th)	3 (5th)	3 (5th)	3 (5th)	3 (5th)	—N/a
Key:	win	draw	loss	bye							

== Fixtures ==
The 2015 Varsity Shield fixtures were released as follows:

- All times are South African (GMT+2).

=== Round one ===
The TUT Vikings hooker and captain Hamish Herd scored two tries to help his side to a 21–16 victory over UFH Blues in Pretoria to initially end the round in second spot. However, this result was later expunged and the fixture was awarded as a win to UFH Blues, with a scoreline of 0–0. This meant that UFH Blues moved into topped the log after Round One. The UKZN Impi moved into second spot on the log following a 16–5 victory over UWC in Cape Town, with fly-half Inny Radebe scoring a try and two conversions for the away side, ahead of joint-third sides TUT Vikings and newly relegated Wits who had a bye in this round. UWC were bottom of the log after the first round.

2 February 2015	UWC	5–16	UKZN Impi	UWC Sport Stadium, Cape Town
16:45	Try: Gavian Cloete 56'; Con: Quaid Langeveldt (0/1)	Report; Scoreboard	Try: Marius Louw 31'; Inny Radebe 54'; Con: Inny Radebe 32', 55' (2/2)	Referee: Cwengile Jadezweni

2 February 2015	TUT Vikings	21–16	UFH Blues	TUT Stadium, Pretoria
19:00	Try: Hamish Herd 9', 42'; Vian Riekert 75'; Con: Paul Walters 10', 43' (2/2); Dylan du Buisson (0/1)	Report; Scoreboard	Try: Aziyena Mandaba 16'; Con: Sivakele Ulana 17' (1/1); Pen: Sivakele Ulana 26', 34', 40', 59' (4/5)	Referee: Stephan Geldenhuys

Bye/s: Wits

=== Round two ===
A hat-trick from centre Marcel Coetzee helped UKZN Impi to a comprehensive 68–5 victory over TUT Vikings to increase their lead at the top of the log to four points, with TUT dropping to bottom of the log. Wits played their first match of the campaign and ran out comfortable 39–24 winners over UFH Blues, with braces by Ish Nkolo and Constant Beckerling for the side from Johannesburg. Wits moved into second place on the log while UFH dropped down to third after suffering their first defeat of the season. UWC had a bye this round and remained in fourth spot on the log.

9 February 2015	UFH Blues	24–39	Wits	Davidson Rugby Field, Alice
18:30	Try: Lwando Nteta 35'; Sivakele Ulana 38'; Lithabile Mgwadleka 70'; Con: Sivakele Ulana 36', 38', 70' (3/3); Cards: Siphesihle Punguzwa (yellow card) 77'	Report; Scoreboard	Try: Ish Nkolo 2', 8'; Constant Beckerling 22', 63'; Ruan van Rensburg 30'; Tommy Damba 79'; Con: Brandan Hewitt 3', 9', 31' (3/6); Cards: Cameron Shafto (yellow card) 66' to 76'	Referee: Fernando Uithaler

9 February 2015	UKZN Impi	68–5	TUT Vikings	Peter Booysen Sports Park, Pietermaritzburg
18:30	Try: Spa Dube 2'; Marcel Coetzee 5', 48', 65'; Ado Wessels 7'; Shayne Makombe 12', 72'; Njabulo Mkize 15'; Inny Radebe 43'; Lwazi Ngcungama 69'; Con: Inny Radebe 2', 15' (2/5); Spa Dube 43', 65', 69', 72' (4/5); Cards: Johan du Toit (yellow card) 55' to 66'	Report; Scoreboard	Try: penalty try 25'; Con: Dylan du Buisson (0/1)	Referee: Ricus van der Hoven

Bye/s: UWC

=== Round three ===
Braces from Constant Beckerling and Tommy Damba helped Wits emerge victorious from the top-two clash against UKZN Impi, with a comprehensive 56–13 win – their second away win in a row – to move them to the top of the log and with a game in hand over UKZN. UWC moved up to third on the log by beating bottom side TUT Vikings 21–18 in Pretoria, with a two-try haul from Damian Stevens proving decisive. UWC leap-frogged UFH Blues, who dropped to fourth spot after a bye in Round Three.

16 February 2015	TUT Vikings	18–21	UWC	TUT Stadium, Pretoria
18:30	Try: RW van der Wal 31'; Wessel Jordaan 58'; Claude Johannes 71'; Con: Dylan du Buisson (0/1); Lewies van Deventer 72' (1/2); Pen: Dylan du Buisson (0/2); Cards: Ruan Pienaar (yellow card) 22' to 32'	Report; Scoreboard	Try: José Julies 23'; Damian Stevens 34', 52'; Con: Herman Share (0/1); Quaid Langeveldt 35', 53' (2/2); Pen: Quaid Langeveldt (0/1); Herman Share (0/1); Cards: Octaven van Stade (yellow card) 65' to 76'	Referee: Renier Vermeulen

16 February 2015	UKZN Impi	13–56	Wits	Peter Booysen Sports Park, Pietermaritzburg
18:30	Try: Chris de Beer 8'; Spa Dube 70'; Con: Spa Dube 70' (1/2)	Report; Scoreboard	Try: Constant Beckerling 2', 17'; Tommy Damba 19', 55'; Luvuyo Pupuma 35'; Graham Logan 41'; Sibusiso Mngomezulu 67'; Con: Brandan Hewitt 3', 18', 20', 37', 41', 56' (6/6); Ruan van Rensburg 67' (1/1); Cards: Constant Beckerling (yellow card) 22' to 33'; Ben Baggott (yellow card) 70'	Referee: Jaco Kotze

Bye/s: UFH Blues

=== Round four ===
The top-versus-bottom match between Wits and TUT Vikings went according to form, with Wits running out 71–36 winners to extend their lead at the top to six points. They ran in ten tries, with Tommy Damba, Ferdinand Kelly and Luxolo Ntsepe getting a brace each, while fly-half Brandan Hewitt scored one of their tries and slotted seven conversions. In the other match, UWC moved level on points with second-placed UKZN Impi who had a bye round, securing an eight-try victory over UFH Blues and running out 49–34 winners with James Verity-Amm grabbing a hat-trick of tries. Both of the losing sides, UFH Blues and TUT Vikings, picked up a bonus point for scoring five tries in their matches, but remained in fourth and fifth respectively.

19 February 2015	UWC	49–34	UFH Blues	UWC Sport Stadium, Cape Town
18:30	Try: James Verity-Amm 2', 9', 63'; Damian Stevens 7'; Quaid Langeveldt 18'; Wayrin Losper 22'; Brandon Valentyn 55' penalty try 78'; Con: Darian Hock 10' (1/4); Quaid Langeveldt 56' (1/3); Keanu Langeveldt 79' (1/1); Pen: Keanu Langeveldt (0/1); Cards: Brandon Valentyn (yellow card) 36'; Tahriq Allan (yellow card) 44' to 55'	Report; Scoreboard	Try: Lwando Mabenge 17'; Aziyena Mandaba 26'; Lithabile Mgwadleka 31', 67'; Sanelise Getye 50'; Con: Akhona Matutu 17', 27' (2/3); Sivakele Ulana 68' (1/2); Cards: Siphesihle Punguzwa (yellow card) 6' to 17'; Aziyena Mandaba (red card) 54'	Referee: Francois Pretorius

19 February 2015	Wits	71–36	TUT Vikings	Wits Rugby Stadium, Johannesburg
18:30	Try: Tommy Damba 7', 47'; Luvuyo Pupuma 16'; Luxolo Ntsepe 20', 68'; Ferdinand Kelly 33', 40'; Constant Beckerling 43'; AJ van Blerk 60'; Brandan Hewitt 71'; Con: Brandan Hewitt 8', 17', 40', 43', 60', 68', 72' (7/10); Cards: AJ van Blerk (yellow card) 35' to 45'	Report; Scoreboard	Try: Edwin Oliver 12'; Tovhowani Nefale 50'; Lewies van Deventer 63'; Vian Riekert 77'; Thabang Kibe 80'; Con: Paul Walters 13', 50' (2/3); Lewies van Deventer 78' (1/2); Pen: Paul Walters 3' (1/2); Cards: Armand Marshall (yellow card) 23' to 33'	Referee: Ricus van der Hoven

Bye/s: UKZN Impi

=== Round five ===
League leaders Wits dropped their first points of the season after they were held to a 37–all draw by third-placed UWC in Johannesburg. Wits were leading 37–16 after 55 minutes, but UWC responded with three more tries late in the game to level things up, with winger James Verity-Amm scoring a second consecutive hat-trick after also getting one in Round Four against UFH Blues. UKZN Impi took advantage of their main rivals drawing to secure a 21–13 victory over UFH, which saw them remain in second, but closed the gap to league leaders Wits to five points. UWC finished Round Five a further point behind UKZN, with UFH Blues remaining in fourth spot and TUT Vikings, who did not play this round, staying in fifth at the halfway point of the regular season.

23 February 2015	UFH Blues	13–21	UKZN Impi	Davidson Rugby Field, Alice
18:30	Try: Athenkosi Manentsa 14'; Siviwe Bisset 69'; Con: Akhona Matutu 15' (1/1); Sivakele Ulana (0/1); Cards: Sivakele Ulana (yellow card) 48' to 58'	Report; Scoreboard	Try: Inny Radebe 3'; Lwazi Ngcungama 11', 32'; Con: Inny Radebe 3', 12' (2/2); Rowan Gouws (0/1); Cards: Sanele Malwane (yellow card) 33' to 47'	Attendance: 3,000; Referee: Vusi Msibi

23 February 2015	Wits	37–37	UWC	Wits Rugby Stadium, Johannesburg
18:30	Try: Luvuyo Pupuma 11'; Luxolo Ntsepe 27'; Ameer Williams 32'; Tommy Damba 40'; Constant Beckerling 54'; Con: AJ van Blerk 11' (1/1); Brandan Hewitt 33', 40', 55' (3/4)	Report; Scoreboard	Try: Quaid Langeveldt 7'; James Verity-Amm 17', 57', 78'; Stuart Austin 70'; Con: Quaid Langeveldt 8', 18' (2/3); Herman Share 58', 79' (2/2)	Referee: AJ Jacobs

Bye/s: TUT Vikings

=== Round six ===
With top-placed side Wits having a bye weekend, they saw their lead at the top reduced to just a single point from UKZN Impi, who ran out 21–5 winners over third-placed UWC. UFH Blues secured their second victory of the season, beating TUT Vikings 29–18 in Alice to also pick up a bonus point for scoring four tries. Their log positions remained unchanged, however, with UFH Blues still in fourth and TUT Vikings in last place with two log points.

2 March 2015	UFH Blues	29–18	TUT Vikings	Davidson Rugby Field, Alice
17:00	Try: Hlubi Mvana 8'; Akhona Matutu 19', 45'; Aziyena Mandaba 28'; Con: Akhona Matutu 20', 29' (2/3); Sivakele Ulana 46' (1/1); Pen: Akhona Matutu (0/1); Cards: Lwando Mabenge (yellow card) 58' to 68'; Siphesihle Punguzwa (yellow card) 69' to 79'	Report; Scoreboard	Try: Dylan du Buisson 25', 36'; Lewies van Deventer 77'; Con: Ruan Pienaar 26' (1/1); Paul Walters (0/1); Dylan du Buisson (0/1); Cards: Claude Johannes (yellow card) 29' to 39'	Attendance: 3,200; Referee: Sindile Ngcese

2 March 2015	UKZN Impi	21–5	UWC	Howard College Rugby Stadium, Durban
18:30	Try: Ado Wessels 3'; Marcel Coetzee 53'; Langelihle Shange 60'; Con: Spa Dube 4', 61' (2/3)	Report; Scoreboard	Try: Lifa Ghana 24'; Con: Quaid Langeveldt (0/1); Cards: José Julies (yellow card) 43' to 54'	Referee: Kurt Weaver

Bye/s: Wits

=== Round seven ===
After their bye in Round Six, leaders Wits returned to form in spectacular style, running in twelve tries in a 93–0 demolition of UFH Blues in Johannesburg. Luxolo Ntsepe scored a hat-trick, while Constant Beckerling and Josh Jarvis got two tries apiece and fly-half Brandan Hewitt scored one try and nine conversions for a personal points tally of 32 points. Second-placed UKZN Impi kept the pressure on Wits however, scoring nine tries in their 66–41 victory over TUT Vikings to remain just one point behind Wits on the log. Marius Louw grabbed a hat-trick in their victory and Spa Dube contributed 21 points with the boot. UWC remained in third place in the league with their bye, while TUT's four-try bonus point wasn't enough to move them ahead of fourth-placed UFH Blues.

9 March 2015	TUT Vikings	41–66	UKZN Impi	TUT Stadium, Pretoria
18:30	Try: Armand Marshall 10'; Mandla Mdaka 27', 57', 77'; Ross Middlecote 69'; Neil de Witt 71'; Con: Paul Walters (0/1); Dylan du Buisson 28', 72', 78' (3/5); Pen: Paul Walters 4' (1/1); Cards: Jaco van Staden (yellow card) 17' to 27'	Report; Scoreboard	Try: Rico Lategan 13', 46'; Marius Louw 18', 24', 35'; Njabulo Mkize 31'; Matthew Mandioma 48'; Ado Wessels 50'; Philip Marais 73'; Con: Spa Dube 14', 19', 25', 32', 47', 49', 51' (7/8); Rowan Gouws (0/1)	Referee: Vusi Msibi

9 March 2015	Wits	93–0	UFH Blues	Wits Rugby Stadium, Johannesburg
18:30	Try: Constant Beckerling 7', 18' penalty try 22'; Brandan Hewitt 31'; Luxolo Ntsepe 39', 53', 72'; Josh Jarvis 40', 43'; Rhyno Herbst 49'; Tommy Damba 60'; Ben Baggott 77'; Con: Brandan Hewitt 8', 19', 22', 32', 39', 40', 44', 49', 54' (9/9); Ruan van Rensburg 72', 77' (2/3)	Report; Scoreboard		Referee: Kurt Weaver

Bye/s: UWC

=== Round eight ===
Hosts Wits emerged victorious in the match between the top two teams in the league, beating UKZN Impi 40–26 to extend their lead at the top of the log to four points. Both teams picked up a four-try bonus point in the match that was only settled with a last-minute Tommy Damba try. This result also meant that Wits secured their place in the final of the competition. UWC kept up their attempt to clinch the other spot in the final by beating TUT Vikings 63–10 in Cape Town. They ran in nine tries, with Quaid Langeveldt, James Verity-Amm and Gordon-Wayne Plaatjes getting a brace each. This result saw them close the gap to second-placed UKZN to six points, with a game in hand. A bye round for UFH Blues saw them remain in fourth spot, well clear of bottom side TUT Vikings.

16 March 2015	UWC	63–10	TUT Vikings	UWC Sport Stadium, Cape Town
18:30	Try: Quaid Langeveldt 22', 41'; James Verity-Amm 27', 47'; Stuart Austin 35'; Brandon Valentyn 54'; Matthew Faught 65'; Gordon-Wayne Plaatjes 73', 78'; Con: Darian Hock 23', 28', 48', 55' (4/6); Quaid Langeveldt 74', 79' (2/3)	Report; Scoreboard	Try: Lewies van Deventer 5'; Con: Dylan du Buisson 6' (1/1); Pen: Dylan du Buisson 1' (1/1); Cards: Edwin Oliver (yellow card) 19' to 29'	Referee: Kurt Weaver

16 March 2015	Wits	40–26	UKZN Impi	Wits Rugby Stadium, Johannesburg
18:30	Try: Ayabulela Mdudi 2', 31'; Koch Marx 24'; Luvuyo Pupuma 57'; Tommy Damba 80'; Con: Brandan Hewitt 3', 25', 32', 57', 80' (5/5)	Report; Scoreboard	Try: Lwazi Ngcungama 15'; Spa Dube 47'; Marius Louw 63'; Philip Marais 75'; Con: Spa Dube 16', 48' (2/3); Cards: Ado Wessels (yellow card) 33' to 43'; David Harel (yellow card) 57' to 67'	Referee: Renier Vermeulen

Bye/s: UFH Blues

=== Round nine ===
With their sixth win of the season, Wits ensured that they would finish the regular season top of the log, which meant that the final would be played in Johannesburg. They ran out 50–5 winners over TUT Vikings with two tries apiece from Tommy Damba and Koch Marx. The identity of their opposition in the final was still unknown, since second-placed UKZN Impi had a bye, which saw UWC reduce the gap to just one point. UWC ran out 58–8 winners over UFH Blues with James Verity-Amm getting his third hat-trick of the season and take his try tally up to eleven in just six appearances. That result also ensured that UFH Blues would finish the season in fourth spot with TUT Vikings guaranteed to finish bottom of the log.

23 March 2015	TUT Vikings	5–50	Wits	TUT Stadium, Pretoria
18:30	Try: Claude Johannes 75'; Con: Vian Riekert (0/1)	Report; Scoreboard	Try: Koch Marx 33', 38'; Tommy Damba 36'; Richard Crossman 45'; Ish Nkolo 48', 56'; Josh Jarvis 65'; Con: Brandan Hewitt 37', 39', 45' (3/5); Ruan van Rensburg 57', 66' (2/2)	Referee: AJ Jacobs

23 March 2015	UFH Blues	8–58	UWC	Davidson Rugby Field, Alice
18:30	Try: Ntyatyambo Mkhafu 3'; Con: Akhona Matutu 4' (1/1); Cards: Siviwe Bisset (yellow card) 39' to 50'; Lwando Nteta (yellow card) 41'	Report; Scoreboard	Try: Minenhle Mthethwa 14'; James Verity-Amm 21', 34', 53'; Quaid Langeveldt 46', 49'; Gordon-Wayne Plaatjes 58'; Yaasien Railoun 73'; Con: Darian Hock 15', 22', 35', 47', 50', 54' (6/7); Herman Share (0/1); Cards: Brandon Beukman (red card) 1'; Stuart Austin (yellow card) 41' to 51'	Referee: Tahla Ntshakaza

Bye/s: UKZN Impi

=== Round ten ===
The final line-up was completed as UKZN Impi joined already-qualified Wits in the final. A hat-trick from centre Marius Louw secured a 42–0 victory for UKZN over fourth-placed UFH Blues in Durban to ensure the side finished second on the log. Meanwhile, log leaders Wits and third-placed UWC played out their second draw of the season, with their match finishing 21–all in Cape Town after drawing 37–all in their Round Five match in Johannesburg. TUT Vikings had a bye round and finished bottom of the log.

30 March 2015	UKZN Impi	42–0	UFH Blues	Howard College Rugby Stadium, Durban
18:30	Try: Marius Louw 6', 38', 46'; Philip Marais 14'; Langelihle Shange 27'; Ado Wessels 78'; Con: Spa Dube 7', 28', 39', 47' (4/6); Cards: Langelihle Shange (yellow card) 31' to 41'	Report; Scoreboard	Cards: Lwando Nteta (yellow card) 31' to 41'; Siphesihle Punguzwa (yellow card) 64'	Referee: Fernando Uithaler

30 March 2015	UWC	21–21	Wits	UWC Sport Stadium, Cape Town
18:30	Try: Quaid Langeveldt 19'; Gordon-Wayne Plaatjes 44'; Chadwin Robertson 74'; Con: Darian Hock 44' (1/2); Quaid Langeveldt 75' (1/1); Cards: Heynes Kotze (red card) 48'	Report; Scoreboard	Try: Angus Gordon 9'; Josh Jarvis 16'; Rhyno Herbst 78'; Con: Brandan Hewitt 10', 79' (2/3)	Referee: Quinton Immelman

Bye/s: TUT Vikings

=== Final ===
The 2015 Varsity Shield was won by UKZN Impi, who won their first ever title after handing Wits their first defeat of the season; a 29–24 defeat in the match played in Johannesburg. UKZN Impi took the lead fifteen minute in through captain Lwazi Ngcungama and didn't relinquish it for the remainder of the match. Fly-half Inny Radebe was the top scorer in the match with eleven points.

6 April 2015	Wits	24–29	UKZN Impi	Wits Rugby Stadium, Johannesburg
16:45	Try: Tommy Damba 40'; Constant Beckerling 47'; Ferdinand Kelly 78'; Con: Brandan Hewitt 40', 48', 78' (3/3)	Report; Scoreboard	Try: Lwazi Ngcungama 15'; Chris de Beer 32'; Inny Radebe 43'; Alwayno Visagie 68'; Con: Inny Radebe 16', 44' (2/3); Spa Dube 69' (1/1); Drop: Inny Radebe (0/1)	Referee: Ricus van der Hoven

== Honours ==
The honour roll for the 2015 Varsity Shield was as follows:

2015 Varsity Shield Honours
Champions:	UKZN Impi
Player That Rocks:	Lwazi Ngcungama, UKZN Impi
Forward That Rocks:	
Back That Rocks:	
Top Try Scorer:	James Verity-Amm, UWC (11)
Top Points Scorer:	Brandan Hewitt, Wits (133)

== Players ==
=== Player statistics ===
The following table contain points which were scored in the 2015 Varsity Shield:

Top Ten points scorers
No	Player	Team	T	C	P	DG	Pts
1	Brandan Hewitt	Wits	2	41	0	0	133
2	Spa Dube	UKZN Impi	3	21	0	0	78
3	Quaid Langeveldt	UWC	7	8	0	0	59
4	James Verity-Amm	UWC	11	0	0	0	55
5	Tommy Damba	Wits	10	0	0	0	50
6	Constant Beckerling	Wits	9	0	0	0	45
7	Inny Radebe	UKZN Impi	4	8	0	0	44
8	Marius Louw	UKZN Impi	8	0	0	0	40
9	Darian Hock	UWC	0	12	0	0	36
10	Sivakele Ulana	UFH Blues	1	6	4	0	31

Other point scorers
No	Player	Team	T	C	P	DG	Pts
11	Luxolo Ntsepe	Wits	6	0	0	0	30
12	Akhona Matutu	UFH Blues	2	6	0	0	28
13	Lwazi Ngcungama	UKZN Impi	5	0	0	0	25
14	Dylan du Buisson	TUT Vikings	2	4	1	0	24
15	Lewies van Deventer	TUT Vikings	3	2	0	0	21
16	Marcel Coetzee	UKZN Impi	4	0	0	0	20
16	Josh Jarvis	Wits	4	0	0	0	20
16	Ish Nkolo	Wits	4	0	0	0	20
16	Gordon-Wayne Plaatjes	UWC	4	0	0	0	20
16	Luvuyo Pupuma	Wits	4	0	0	0	20
16	Ruan van Rensburg	Wits	1	5	0	0	20
16	Ado Wessels	UKZN Impi	4	0	0	0	20
23	Paul Walters	TUT Vikings	0	4	2	0	16
24	Ferdinand Kelly	Wits	3	0	0	0	15
24	Aziyena Mandaba	UFH Blues	3	0	0	0	15
24	Philip Marais	UKZN Impi	3	0	0	0	15
24	Koch Marx	Wits	3	0	0	0	15
24	Mandla Mdaka	TUT Vikings	3	0	0	0	15
24	Lithabile Mgwadleka	UFH Blues	3	0	0	0	15
24	Damian Stevens	UWC	3	0	0	0	15
31	Stuart Austin	UWC	2	0	0	0	10
31	Chris de Beer	UKZN Impi	2	0	0	0	10
31	Rhyno Herbst	Wits	2	0	0	0	10
31	Hamish Herd	TUT Vikings	2	0	0	0	10
31	Claude Johannes	TUT Vikings	2	0	0	0	10
31	Rico Lategan	UKZN Impi	2	0	0	0	10
31	Shayne Makombe	UKZN Impi	2	0	0	0	10
31	Ayabulela Mdudi	Wits	2	0	0	0	10
31	Njabulo Mkize	UKZN Impi	2	0	0	0	10
31	Vian Riekert	TUT Vikings	2	0	0	0	10
31	Langelihle Shange	UKZN Impi	2	0	0	0	10
31	Brandon Valentyn	UWC	2	0	0	0	10
43	AJ van Blerk	Wits	1	1	0	0	8
44	Herman Share	UWC	0	2	0	0	6
45	Ben Baggott	Wits	1	0	0	0	5
45	Siviwe Bisset	UFH Blues	1	0	0	0	5
45	Gavian Cloete	UWC	1	0	0	0	5
45	Richard Crossman	Wits	1	0	0	0	5
45	Neil de Witt	TUT Vikings	1	0	0	0	5
45	Matthew Faught	UWC	1	0	0	0	5
45	Sanelise Getye	UFH Blues	1	0	0	0	5
45	Lifa Ghana	UWC	1	0	0	0	5
45	Angus Gordon	Wits	1	0	0	0	5
45	Wessel Jordaan	TUT Vikings	1	0	0	0	5
45	José Julies	UWC	1	0	0	0	5
45	Thabang Kibe	TUT Vikings	1	0	0	0	5
45	Graham Logan	Wits	1	0	0	0	5
45	Wayrin Losper	UWC	1	0	0	0	5
45	Lwando Mabenge	UFH Blues	1	0	0	0	5
45	Matthew Mandioma	UKZN Impi	1	0	0	0	5
45	Athenkosi Manentsa	UFH Blues	1	0	0	0	5
45	Armand Marshall	TUT Vikings	1	0	0	0	5
45	Ross Middlecote	TUT Vikings	1	0	0	0	5
45	Sibusiso Mngomezulu	Wits	1	0	0	0	5
45	Minenhle Mthethwa	UWC	1	0	0	0	5
45	Hlubi Mvana	UFH Blues	1	0	0	0	5
45	Tovhowani Nefale	TUT Vikings	1	0	0	0	5
45	Lwando Nteta	UFH Blues	1	0	0	0	5
45	Edwin Oliver	TUT Vikings	1	0	0	0	5
45	Ntyatyambo Mkhafu	UFH Blues	1	0	0	0	5
45	Yaasien Railoun	UWC	1	0	0	0	5
45	Chadwin Robertson	UWC	1	0	0	0	5
45	RW van der Wal	TUT Vikings	1	0	0	0	5
45	Alwayno Visagie	UKZN Impi	1	0	0	0	5
45	Ameer Williams	Wits	1	0	0	0	5
75	Keanu Langeveldt	UWC	0	1	0	0	3
75	Ruan Pienaar	TUT Vikings	0	1	0	0	3
—	penalty try	TUT Vikings	1	0	0	0	5
—	penalty try	UWC	1	0	0	0	5
—	penalty try	Wits	1	0	0	0	5
* Legend: T = Tries, C = Conversions, P = Penalties, DG = Drop Goals, Pts = Points.

=== Squad lists ===
The teams released the following squad lists:

TUT Vikings

Forwards

- Jeremia Burger
- Shaun de Wet
- Neil de Witt
- James Frost
- Hamish Herd
- Claude Johannes
- Wessel Jordaan
- Attie Joubert
- Jean-Claude le Roux
- Calvin Maduna
- Armand Marshall
- Percy Matlhoko
- Mandla Mdaka
- Ross Middlecote
- Ratsaka Modjadji
- DK Mukendi
- Daniel Richter
- Jaco van Staden
- Wian van Schalkwyk
- Did not play:
- Isak Deetlefs
- Mpho Kganakga
- Dimpho Matshediso
- Bethuel Mosetekoa
- Lindokuhle Sambo
- Ryan Sim

Backs

- Lisa Banzi
- Dylan du Buisson
- Shawn Jaards
- Deon Joubert
- Thabang Kibe
- Tovhowani Nefale
- Octavian Nkomonde
- Edwin Oliver
- Ruan Pienaar
- Vian Riekert
- Nelis Snyman
- RW van der Wal
- Lewies van Deventer
- Litha Vumisa
- Paul Walters
- Did not play:
- Leroy Afrika
- Thomas Joubert
- Ndivho Nematandani
- Dwayne Swart
- Dries van der Westhuizen

Coach

- Sax Chirwa

UFH Blues

Forwards

- Lutho Klaas
- Madoda Ludidi
- Lwando Mabenge
- Athenkosi Makeleni
- Athenkosi Manentsa
- Ntyatyambo Mkhafu
- Olwethu Mputla
- Lusindiso Nkomo
- Lwando Nteta
- Siphesihle Punguzwa
- Zanoxolo Qwele
- Sibusiso Sityebi
- Sesethu Time
- Mzinga Vitsha
- Malusi Vula
- Did not play:
- Darren Alexander
- Asiphe Fanele
- Busiwe Fani
- Litha Labase
- Andile Makinana
- Philisani Khangelani Ncoko
- Siphelele Njobeni
- Likhona Nkqoli
- Ntsika Nyalambisa
- Misubukhosi Pienaar
- Siyabulela Sijula

Backs

- Siviwe Bisset
- Sanelise Getye
- Khanyiso Komani
- Ntsika Kula
- Aziyena Mandaba
- Akhona Matutu
- Lithabile Mgwadleka
- Hlubi Mvana
- Sthembiso Ngwenya
- Lundi Ralarala
- Elandre Sias
- Khaya Siqoko
- Sivakele Ulana
- Did not play:
- Luyolo Batshise
- Benson Chiripanhura
- Asiphe Fihla
- Yanga Nakani
- Sibusiso Sinuka

Coach

- Elliott Fana

UKZN Impi

Forwards

- Marné Coetzee
- Chris de Beer
- Johan du Toit
- David Harel
- Michael Hutton
- Sizwe Kubheka
- Sanele Malwane
- Matthew Mandioma
- Siya Mhlongo
- Njabulo Mkize
- Ntando Mpofana
- Lwazi Ngcungama
- William Paxton
- Kwezi Puza
- Christie van der Merwe
- Mikyle Webster
- Ado Wessels
- Did not play:
- Henri Boshoff
- Mees Erasmus
- Sikhumbuzo Rowen Gasa
- Mzamo Majola
- Emilien Mary
- Milani Lutho Motlohi
- Clive Musasiwa
- Lindo Radebe
- Nduduzo Thembelenkosini Sithole
- Ayathandwa Tsengiwe

Backs

- Thobekani Buthelezi
- Marcel Coetzee
- Spa Dube
- Rowan Gouws
- Graham Koch
- Rico Lategan
- Marius Louw
- Shayne Makombe
- Philip Marais
- Yandisa Mdolomba
- Gavin Nyawata
- Inny Radebe
- Langelihle Shange
- Alwayno Visagie
- Sandile Zulu
- Did not play:
- Jurie Johannes Ingram
- Manqoba Mqudi
- Miguel Thabo Ncube
- Michael Scheepers
- Bongumusa Tshabalala

Coach

- Ryan Strudwick

UWC

Forwards

- Tahriq Allan
- Stuart Austin
- Curtis Beukes
- Brandon Beukman
- Alwyn Carstens
- Kelvin de Bruyn
- Matthew Faught
- Lifa Ghana
- José Julies
- Heynes Kotze
- Mitch Lingeveldt
- Wayrin Losper
- Darren Luiters
- Sebenza Maphumulo
- Chadwin Robertson
- Brandon Valentyn
- Did not play:
- Axolile Apleni
- Mische Kamlesh Vallabh

Backs

- Gavian Cloete
- Clayton Daniels
- Lubabalo Faleni
- Dean Herbert
- Gustav Heydenrych
- Darian Hock
- Keanu Langeveldt
- Quaid Langeveldt
- Minenhle Mthethwa
- Matthew Nortjé
- Shane Pietersen
- Gordon-Wayne Plaatjes
- Yaasien Railoun
- Herman Share
- Damian Stevens
- Octaven van Stade
- James Verity-Amm
- Did not play:
- Stephan Borman
- Chad Christopher de Klerk
- Blake Andre Reineke
- Wilbré van Wyk
- Melik Wana

Coach

- Peter de Villiers

Wits

Forwards

- Ben Baggott
- Constant Beckerling
- Richard Crossman
- Jethi de Lange
- Angus Gordon
- Rhyno Herbst
- Ferdinand Kelly
- Graham Logan
- Ayabulela Mdudi
- Chris Mills
- Brandon Palmer
- Luvuyo Pupuma
- Cameron Shafto
- Tijde Visser
- Ameer Williams
- Did not play:
- Wazeer Desai
- Mitchell Fraser
- Gihard Visagie

Backs

- Alistair Ballantyne
- Tommy Damba
- Sicelo Champion
- Ruan Cloete
- Brandan Hewitt
- Josh Jarvis
- Koch Marx
- Sibusiso Mngomezulu
- Ish Nkolo
- Luxolo Ntsepe
- AJ van Blerk
- Dandré van den Berg
- Ruan van Rensburg
- Did not play:
- Joel Bwanakawa
- Kyle Wesemann

Coach

- Hugo van As

=== Discipline ===
The following table contains all the cards handed out during the tournament:

Sendings-off and multiple sin-binnings
Player	Team	Sent off (straight red)	Temporarily suspended
Brandon Beukman	UWC	1	0
Heynes Kotze	UWC	1	0
Aziyena Mandaba	UFH Blues	1	0
Siphesihle Punguzwa	UFH Blues	0	4
Lwando Nteta	UFH Blues	0	2

Single sin-binnings
Player	Team	Sent off (straight red)	Temporarily suspended
Tahriq Allan	UWC	0	1
Stuart Austin	UWC	0	1
Ben Baggott	Wits	0	1
Constant Beckerling	Wits	0	1
Siviwe Bisset	UFH Blues	0	1
Johan du Toit	UKZN Impi	0	1
David Harel	UKZN Impi	0	1
Claude Johannes	TUT Vikings	0	1
José Julies	UWC	0	1
Lwando Mabenge	UFH Blues	0	1
Sanele Malwane	UKZN Impi	0	1
Armand Marshall	TUT Vikings	0	1
Edwin Oliver	TUT Vikings	0	1
Ruan Pienaar	TUT Vikings	0	1
Cameron Shafto	Wits	0	1
Langelihle Shange	UKZN Impi	0	1
Sivakele Ulana	UFH Blues	0	1
Brandon Valentyn	UWC	0	1
AJ van Blerk	Wits	0	1
Octaven van Stade	UWC	0	1
Jaco van Staden	TUT Vikings	0	1
Ado Wessels	UKZN Impi	0	1
* Legend: (red card) = Sent off, (yellow card) = Sin-binned

== Referees ==
The following referees officiated matches in the 2015 Varsity Shield:

- Stephan Geldenhuys
- Quinton Immelman
- AJ Jacobs
- Cwengile Jadezweni
- Jaco Kotze
- Vusi Msibi
- Sindile Ngcese
- Tahla Ntshakaza
- Francois Pretorius
- Fernando Uithaler
- Ricus van der Hoven
- Renier Vermeulen
- Kurt Weaver

== See also ==
- Varsity Cup
- 2015 Varsity Rugby
- 2015 Varsity Cup
- 2015 SARU Community Cup
- 2015 Vodacom Cup
