= James Verity-Amm =

South African rugby union player

- Full name: James Nicholas Verity-Amm
- Born: 8 June 1994 (age 32) Kroonstad, South Africa
- Height: 1.85 m (6 ft 1 in)
- Weight: 86 kg (190 lb; 13 st 8 lb)
- School: Hottentots Holland High School, Somerset West

Rugby union career
- Position: Wing / Fullback
Youth career
- 2013–2015: Western Province
Amateur team(s)
Years	Team	Apps	(Points)
2014–2015	UWC	14	(75)
Senior career
Years	Team	Apps	(Points)
2017	Force	8	(5)
2017	Perth Spirit	9	(25)
2018	Brumbies	1	(0)
2020–2021	Griquas	12	(35)
2021–	Bulls	3	(0)
2022–2023	Blue Bulls	5	(15)
- Correct as of 23 July 2022

James Nicholas Verity-Amm (born 8 June 1994) is a South African rugby union player. Currently released, he previously played for the Bulls in the United Rugby Championship and for the Blue Bulls in the Currie Cup. He did play as a winger or full-back.

== Rugby career ==
=== 2013–2015: Youth and Varsity Shield rugby ===
Verity-Amm was born in Kroonstad, but grew up in the Western Cape, where he attended Hottentots Holland High School in Somerset West. In 2013, Verity-Amm made two appearances for the Cape Town-based Western Province U19 in the Under-19 Provincial Championship.

He played Varsity Shield rugby for UWC in 2014 and 2015. He scored four tries in seven appearances in 2014 – including two in a match against UFH Blues – as UWC struggled in the competition, finishing second-bottom on the log. In 2015, Verity-Amm endured a purple patch, scoring hat-tricks in both of their matches against UFH Blues, and away to eventual runner-up Wits, and two tries against TUT Vikings, to finish as the competition's top scorer with eleven tries in seven starts.

He also featured for Western Province U21 in the 2015 Under-21 Provincial Championship, making three appearances, including one in the final, where he scored a late try to round off his side's 52–17 victory over Free State U21 to secure the title.

=== 2016–present: Western Force and Perth Spirit ===
In 2016, Verity-Amm moved to Perth in Australia, where he joined the Future Force, the academy of the Western Force Super Rugby franchise. He was named in the Perth Spirit squad for the 2016 National Rugby Championship, but failed to feature in any matches.

After featuring for the Western Force against the Perth Spirit at a pre-season trial match in January 2017 which saw him score a hat-trick of tries in a 22–14 win, Verity-Amm was then named in the starting line-up for their home match against the Lions in Round Ten of the 2017 Super Rugby season.
