= Cameron Wright (rugby union) =

South Africa international rugby union player

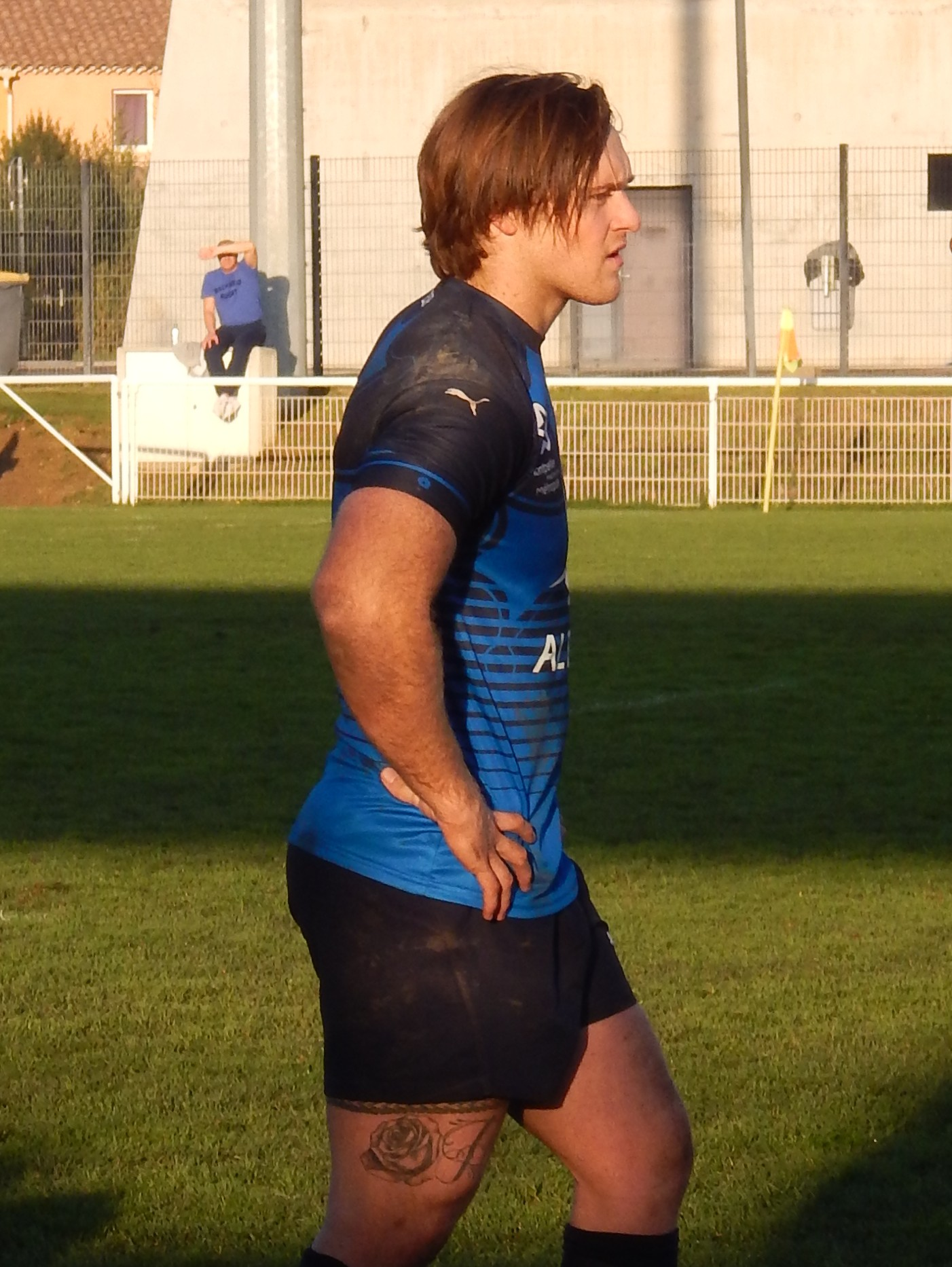
- Full name: Cameron Robin Wright
- Born: 20 April 1994 (age 32) Westville, South Africa
- Height: 1.81 m (5 ft 11 1/2 in)
- Weight: 92 kg (14 st 7 lb; 203 lb)

Rugby union career
- Position: Scrum-half
- Current team: Sharks / Sharks (Currie Cup)
Youth career
- 2010–2014: Sharks
Amateur team(s)
Years	Team	Apps	(Points)
2014	UKZN Impi	10	(20)
Senior career
Years	Team	Apps	(Points)
2014	Sharks (Currie Cup)	10	(0)
2015	Sharks XV	6	(20)
2015	Sharks	1	(0)
2015–2017	Montpellier	14	(5)
2017–present	Sharks (Currie Cup)	32	(30)
2018–2020	Sharks	27	(10)
2018	Sharks XV	1	(0)
2021–	Sharks	2	(0)
- Correct as of 23 July 2022

Cameron Robin Wright (born 20 April 1994) is a South African rugby union player for the Sharks in Super Rugby and in the Currie Cup. His regular position is scrum-half.

== Career ==
=== Youth and Varsity Cup rugby ===
Wright represented KwaZulu-Natal at Under-16 level when he was selected in their squad for the Grant Khomo Week held in Upington in 2010. Two years later, he represented their Under-18 side at the 2012 Under-18 Craven Week tournament.

Later in the same year, Wright was a member of the Sharks U19 side that played in the 2012 Under-19 Provincial Championship, starting seven of their matches. He made twelve appearances for the team during the 2013 Under-19 Provincial Championship and graduated to the Sharks U21 side in 2014.

In 2014, Wright also played in the Varsity Shield competition for university side UKZN Impi. He started all eight regular season matches for the side as they finished in second place. He also played in the final against CUT Ixias, but could not prevent them slipping to a 35–26 defeat. He also played in the side's promotion play-off as they attempted to secure a spot in the 2015 Varsity Cup, but failing to do so as they suffered a 42–8 defeat to UJ.

=== Sharks ===
After the 2014 Varsity Shield, Wright was included in the Sharks XV squad for the 2014 Vodacom Cup competition and was named on the bench for their match against the Golden Lions, but failed to make an appearance.

A few months later, however, Wright found himself as the starting scrum-half for the Sharks for their opening match of the 2014 Currie Cup Premier Division season following the recent departure of Charl McLeod, Cobus Reinach's involvement with the South Africa national rugby union team and injuries to Conrad Hoffmann and Stefan Ungerer.
