= Lithabile Mgwadleka =

South African rugby union player

- Born: 7 January 1991 (age 35) Bisho, South Africa
- Height: 1.85 m (6 ft 1 in)
- Weight: 96 kg (15 st 2 lb; 212 lb)
- School: Bisho High School
- University: University of Fort Hare

Rugby union career
- Position(s): Winger; Centre
- Current team: Border Bulldogs
Amateur team(s)
Years	Team	Apps	(Points)
2012–2015	UFH Blues	25	(40)
Senior career
Years	Team	Apps	(Points)
2014–present	Border Bulldogs	15	(10)
- Correct as of 7 July 2016

Lithabile Mgwadleka (born 7 January 1991 in Bisho, South Africa) is a South African rugby union player, currently playing with the Border Bulldogs. His regular position is winger or inside centre.

== Career ==
=== UFH Blues ===
He represented the UFH Blues side in the Varsity Shield competition since 2012. He made five appearances in 2012, scoring one try. He also scored one try in eight appearances in 2013 and started all eight of their matches in the 2014 Varsity Shield, scoring three tries as the Blues finished in their highest ever position of third.

=== Border Bulldogs ===
At the start of 2014, the Border Bulldogs were in serious financial troubles and recruited a number of club players, as well as members of the UFH Blues side after the 2014 Varsity Shield concluded. Mgwadleka was one of the players that linked up with the East London-based side and he made his first class debut during the 2014 Vodacom Cup competition when he was named in their run-on side for their 54–17 defeat to the Free State XV in Bloemfontein. He started a further two matches during the competition and was retained in the Border Bulldogs squad that participated in the 2014 Currie Cup qualification tournament.
