= Deon Carney =

South African rugby union footballer

- Full name: Deon Carney
- Born: 30 August 1991 (age 35) Brits, South Africa
- Height: 1.80 m (5 ft 11 in)
- Weight: 84 kg (13 st 3 lb; 185 lb)
- School: Northern Cape High

Rugby union career
- Position: Loose forward
- Current team: Leopards
Youth career
- 2007–2009: Griquas
Senior career
Years	Team	Apps	(Points)
2013	Griquas	8	(10)
2014	Leopards	1	(5)
- Correct as of 6 October 2014

Deon Carney is a South African rugby union footballer currently playing with the Leopards. His usual position is loose forward.

Carney was part of the Griquas youth structures from 2007 to 2009 before heading overseas to New Zealand where he was a member of Wellington's Wider Training Squad for the 2012 ITM Cup although he didn't make any appearances.

He returned to South Africa ahead of the 2012 Vodacom Cup Season and re-joined Griquas. He made his senior debut against the Blue Bulls on 9 March 2013 and made eight appearances, but was not retained for the 2013 Currie Cup Premier Division.
