= Gideon Koegelenberg =

South African rugby union player

- Born: 25 November 1994 (age 31) Wellington, South Africa
- Height: 2.01 m (6 ft 7 in)
- Weight: 122 kg (19 st 3 lb; 269 lb)
- School: Hugenote Hoërskool

Rugby union career
- Position: Lock
- Current team: Hino Red Dolphins
Youth career
- 2011–2012: Boland Cavaliers
- 2012–2013: Sharks
- 2015: Golden Lions
Amateur team(s)
Years	Team	Apps	(Points)
2014	UKZN Impi	5	(0)
Senior career
Years	Team	Apps	(Points)
2013 2018–2019	Sharks (Vodacom Cup)	9	(10)
2015–2017	Zebre	32	(0)
2018–2019	Sharks	9	(0)
2018–2019 2025	Sharks (Currie Cup)	19	(5)
2020	Rebels	5	(0)
2020–2023	Kurita Water Gush	16	(5)
2023–2025	Benetton	8	(0)
2025–2026	Mitsubishi Dynaboars	3	(0)
2026–	Hino Red Dolphins		
- Correct as of 17 October 2020
International career
Years	Team	Apps	(Points)
2012	South Africa Schools	2	(0)
- Correct as of 20 April 2018

Gideon Koegelenberg (born 25 November 1994) is a South African rugby union player for the Mitsubishi Dynaboars. He usually plays as a lock. In the past he also played for Australian Super Rugby franchise Rebels and for the Benetton in United Rugby Championship.

== Rugby career ==
=== Youth rugby ===
Koegelenberg was born in Wellington and played for the Boland Cavaliers at youth level. He earned inclusion in the 2012 South Africa Schools squad and made appearances against France and England.

=== Sharks / UKZN Impi ===
He then joined the Sharks Academy, where he made a single appearances against former side Boland Cavaliers. A knee injury hampered his progress at the Durban-based side, ruling him out of the entire 2014 season. He made five appearances for the UKZN Impi in the team's title-winning 2015 Varsity Shield season.

=== Golden Lions ===
Koegelenberg joined the Golden Lions in 2015, where he made eleven appearances in the 2015 Under-21 Provincial Championship Group A, scoring one try against Leopards U21.

=== Zebre ===
He then moved to Italy to join Pro12 side Zebre during the 2015–16 season. He played five matches during the 2015–16 season, and a further 12 in the 2016–17 season, starting nine matches and receiving three yellow cards.

=== Return to Sharks ===
At the end of the 2017 season, Koegelenberg left Zebre to return to South Africa, and to former Super Rugby side the Sharks, signing a two-year deal with the Durban-based franchise in order to play also in the Currie Cup and the Sharks XV in the Rugby Challenge.

=== Benetton ===
Koegelenberg signed for Benetton Rugby in May 2023 ahead of the 2023–24 United Rugby Championship. He made his debut in Round 1 of the 2023–24 season against the Cardiff. He played with Benetton in the United Rugby Championship until 2025.

== Super Rugby statistics ==
As of 27 May 2020

Season	Team	Games	Starts	Sub	Mins	Tries	Cons	Pens	Drops	Points	Yel	Red
2018	Sharks	1	0	1	19	0	0	0	0	0	0	0
2019	Sharks	5	1	4	178	0	0	0	0	0	0	0
2020	Rebels	5	2	3	174	0	0	0	0	0	0	0
Total		11	3	8	371	0	0	0	0	0	0	0
