= Kabous van Schalkwyk =

South African rugby union player

- Full name: Stefan Hugo van Schalkwyk
- Born: 30 May 1994 (age 32) George, South Africa
- Height: 1.87 m (6 ft 1 1/2 in)
- Weight: 122 kg (269 lb; 19 st 3 lb)
- School: Hoër Landbouskool Oakdale
- University: Central University of Technology

Rugby union career
- Position: Prop
- Current team: Free State Cheetahs / Free State XV
Youth career
- 2013: Sharks
- 2015: Eastern Province Kings
Senior career
Years	Team	Apps	(Points)
2018	Free State Cheetahs	2	(0)
- Correct as of 22 September 2018

Stefan Hugo 'Kabous' van Schalkwyk (born 30 May 1994) is a South African rugby union player who last played for the Free State Cheetahs in the Currie Cup and the Free State XV in the Rugby Challenge. His regular position is prop.
