= Marius Louw =

South African rugby union player

- Born: 24 October 1995 (age 31) Bloemfontein, South Africa
- Height: 1.82 m (5 ft 11 1/2 in)
- Weight: 95 kg (14 st 13 lb; 209 lb)
- School: Grey College
- University: University of KwaZulu-Natal

Rugby union career
- Position: Centre / Flanker
- Current team: Lions / Golden Lions
Youth career
- 2008–2013: Free State Cheetahs
- 2014–2016: Sharks
Amateur team(s)
Years	Team	Apps	(Points)
2015–2016	UKZN Impi	12	(55)
Senior career
Years	Team	Apps	(Points)
2015–2019	Sharks XV	21	(60)
2017–2022	Sharks	44	(20)
2017–2022	Sharks (Currie Cup)	36	(35)
2022–2025	Lions	60	(80)
2023–2025	Golden Lions	6	(5)
2025–	Sale Sharks	0	(0)
- Correct as of 8 September 2025

Marius Louw (born 24 October 1995) is a South African professional rugby union player for the Lions in URC and in the Currie Cup. His regular position is centre, but he also played as a flanker earlier in his career.

== Rugby career ==
=== 2008–2013: Schoolboy rugby ===
Louw was born in Bloemfontein and represented the Free State Cheetahs at schoolboy level. He played for them as early as primary school level, at the Under-13 Craven Week in 2008. At high school level, he was twice selected to play for the Free State at the Under-18 Craven Week, the premier high school rugby union competition in South Africa, playing at the 2012 event in Port Elizabeth where he scored a try in their match against the Falcons and at the 2013 event in Polokwane, where he was utilised as a flanker and contributed a try in their defeat to the Pumas.

=== 2014–2021: Sharks / UKZN Impi ===
After high school, Louw moved to Durban to join the Sharks academy. He started the first three matches of the Sharks U19's 2014 Under-19 Provincial Championship season as a flanker before moving into the backline in the centre position, where he played for the rest of the season. He started eleven of the team's twelve matches during the regular season, scoring tries in their matches against Leopards U19 and Blue Bulls U19 as his team finished fourth on the log to secure the final semi-final spot. Louw also started the semi-final, but could not prevent his side losing the match 20–43 to the Blue Bulls.

At the start of 2015, Louw played Varsity Shield rugby with UKZN Impi. He started four of their eight matches during the regular season, scoring eight tries. He scored hat-tricks in matches against the TUT Vikings and the UFH Blues and single tries against UWC and Wits, topping the try-scoring charts for his side and fourth overall in the competition. UKZN Impi finished in second spot on the log to qualify for the final, in which Louw started and helped his side to a 29–24 victory over Wits to win the title for the first time.

Soon after the conclusion of the Varsity Shield, Louw was also drafted into the Sharks XV squad for the 2015 Vodacom Cup. He made his first class debut on 17 April 2015, coming on as a replacement for the Sharks XV in their 13–36 defeat to the SWD Eagles in George. He was promoted to the starting lineup for his home debut against the Boland Cavaliers a week later, scoring two tries in a 52–12 victory in Empangeni. Another try followed in his next match against Griquas in a 24–27 defeat and he started a third consecutive match a week later against the Eastern Province Kings in the team's final match of the regular season. The team finished sixth on the Southern Section log, failing to qualify for the quarter-finals.

After coming on as a replacement in the Sharks U21s' second match of the Under-21 Provincial Championship season, he firmly established himself as the team's first-choice inside centre, starting ten of their remaining eleven matches in that position. He scored tries against Leopards U21, Western Province U21 and Blue Bulls U21, as his team finished third, before losing to Louw's hometown team Free State U21 in the semi-finals.

Louw was named in the Sharks Super Rugby squad for the 2016 season, but didn't feature in any matches for the team. Instead, he continued his development with the UKZN Impi in the 2016 Varsity Shield, making seven appearances. He scored one try against UFH Blues and two against TUT Vikings as his team won seven of their eight matches. UKZN Impi would have finished joint-top of the log with Wits, but they had 12 points deducted for fielding an ineligible player, therefore missing out on the title play-offs and a shot at promotion to the Varsity Cup.

Louw was again named in the Sharks XV squad – participating in the 2016 Currie Cup qualification series that effectively replaced the Vodacom Cup – and made six appearances. After an appearance off the bench against the Border Bulldogs, he made his first start of the season against Namibian side the Welwitschias in Umlazi, scoring the first hat trick of his senior career in a 48–18 victory. He made a further four starts for the team, scoring tries in matches against Western Province and Griquas as they finished in tenth place on the log.

Louw was included in their squad for the 2016 Currie Cup Premier Division, but didn't feature for the team, instead making five starts for the Sharks U21 in the 2016 Under-21 Provincial Championship. At the end of October 2016, he was included in the Sharks Super Rugby squad for the 2017 season.

On 12 March 2025, it was confirmed that Louw would move to England to join Sale Sharks on a two-year deal in the Premiership Rugby from the 2025-26 season.
