= 2016 Eastern Province Kings season =

Team Information
- Stadium: Nelson Mandela Bay Stadium
- President: Cheeky Watson

Currie Cup qualification
- Coach: Robbi Kempson
- Captains: Lusanda Badiyana, Cornell Hess, Sintu Manjezi and Jeremy Ward
- Rank: 14th
- Record: Won 2, Drew 1, Lost 11
- Top points scorer: Garrick Mattheus (66)
- Top try scorer: Somila Jho (5)

Currie Cup Premier Division
- Coach: Barend Pieterse
- Captains: Martin Bezuidenhout, Schalk Ferreira and Ricky Schroeder
- Rank: 9th
- Record: Lost 8
- Top points scorer: Pieter-Steyn de Wet (27)
- Top try scorer: Johann Tromp (3)

Other seasons
- Previous season: ← 2015
- Next season: 2017 →

In 2016, the Eastern Province Kings participated in the Currie Cup competition. The Eastern Province U21 team played in the 2016 Under-21 Provincial Championship and the Eastern Province U19 team in the 2016 Under-19 Provincial Championship.

In addition, the formally affiliated Super Rugby franchise, the Southern Kings, participateD in the Super Rugby competition between February and July. From 2016, the team is controlled directly by SARU, and has no affiliation with the Eastern Province Rugby Union or Eastern Province Kings.

== Chronological list of events ==
- 2 November 2015: The Eastern Province Rugby Union announced the departure of several players; Enrico Acker, Karlo Aspeling, Eben Barnard, Albé de Swardt, Samora Fihlani, Andile Jho, Paul Schoeman, Kuhle Sonkosi, Claude Tshidibi and George Whitehead all left after their contracts expired, Jaco Grobler and Jan Uys were both given an early release of their contracts and Marlou van Niekerk joined the Pumas on loan.
- 11 November 2015: Following the failure of the EPRU to meet a deadline to pay their players' salaries, South African Rugby Players Association spokesperson Nyaniso Sam confirmed that all contracted players could sign contracts with other teams. Centre Tim Whitehead announced that he would be one of the players to leave the Kings.
- 12 November 2015: Two more players left the EP Kings, with Lizo Gqoboka joining the Blue Bulls and Tim Agaba also announcing his intention to leave.
- 14 November 2015: A fourth Kings player announced his departure, with winger Luther Obi joining the Bulls.
- 16 November 2015: The EP Rugby Union confirmed that Obi and fellow winger Sylvian Mahuza both stated their intention to leave, but also confirmed that Louis Fouché, Carel Greeff, James Hilterbrand, SP Marais, Caylib Oosthuizen, Mark Richards, JC Roos, Jurgen Visser and Stefan Watermeyer have joined the squad and started pre-season training.
- 17 November 2015: The South African Rugby Union announced that they would take control of the Southern Kings Super Rugby franchise following the ongoing cashflow problems.
- 27 November 2015: Loose-forward Tim Agaba – who previously stated his intention to leave – and outside back Siviwe Soyizwapi are both contracted by the South African Rugby Union for the South African Sevens team on two-year contracts.
- 2 December 2015: Head coach Brent Janse van Rensburg resigned from his position, with the Boland Cavaliers confirming ongoing talks with Janse van Rensburg about joining their coaching staff.
- 4 December 2015: The South African Rugby Union, who took control of the Southern Kings Super Rugby side on 17 November, announced their operational plan. As part of the plan, SARU would operate the franchise independently from the Eastern Province Kings, which meant that they would negotiate Super Rugby contracts with identified players, and not necessarily the same players previously signed to Super Rugby contract by the Eastern Province Rugby Union.
- 7 December 2015: Eastern Province Kings players representative handed a petition to president Cheeky Watson, in which players announced their refusal to play for the Eastern Province Kings or Southern Kings until certain issues were sorted out; these issues included outstanding player salaries, a vote of confidence in the current EPRU executive committee and the appointment of specialists to propose a sustainable funding model for the rugby union.
- 12 January 2016: English RFU Championship side Jersey announced the signing of EP Kings prop Simon Kerrod.
- 26 January 2016: Three scholars from Linkside High School were given contracts to join the EP Kings Rugby Academy - lock Hussayn Banzi, fly-half Thabo Matiso and flank Lubabalo Ndamase.
- 28 January 2016: The South African Rugby Players' Association submitted a liquidation application against EP Rugby (Pty) Ltd on behalf of eighteen Eastern Province Kings players who were not included in the Southern Kings Super Rugby squad for 2016 and have not received their salaries since September 2015.
- 9 March 2016: The Eastern Province Rugby Union confirm that Kings Academy manager Robbi Kempson would be the head coach of the Eastern Province Kings for the 2016 Currie Cup qualification series.
- 10 March 2016: The Port Elizabeth High Court provisionally liquidates Eastern Province Rugby, while a failure to pay outstanding player salaries before 10 May 2016 could see the liquidation order being made final.

== Currie Cup qualification ==
=== Squad ===
The following players were named in the Eastern Province Kings squad for 2016 Currie Cup qualification series:

2016 Eastern Province Kings Currie Cup qualification squad
Player	Position/s	Date of birth (age)	First class		EP Kings	
Player	Position/s	Date of birth (age)	Apps	Pts	Apps	Pts
(South Africa) Louis Albertse	Prop	2 April 1990 (aged 26)	6	0	–	–
(South Africa) Lusanda Badiyana	Lock	1 September 1996 (aged 19)	–	–	–	–
(South Africa) Tango Balekile	Hooker	7 March 1996 (aged 20)	–	–	–	–
(South Africa) Martin Bezuidenhout	Hooker	21 August 1989 (aged 26)	85	50	–	–
(South Africa) Thaki Boloko	Fullback	4 March 1997 (aged 19)	–	–	–	–
(South Africa) Simon Bolze	Fly-half	30 July 1995 (aged 20)	–	–	–	–
(South Africa) Brandon Brown	Flanker	16 November 1994 (aged 21)	–	–	–	–
(South Africa) Michael Brink	Fly-half	24 September 1996 (aged 19)	–	–	–	–
(South Africa) Davron Cameron	Scrum-half	8 June 1996 (aged 19)	–	–	–	–
(South Africa) Wihan Coetzer	Lock	30 August 1996 (aged 19)	–	–	–	–
(South Africa) Stephan Deyzel	Flanker	24 April 1992 (aged 23)	–	–	–	–
(South Africa) JP du Plessis	Centre	29 April 1991 (aged 24)	40	30	10	5
(South Africa) Ivan-John du Preez	Winger	23 June 1994 (aged 21)	5	10	5	10
(South Africa) Philip du Preez	Lock	1 August 1993 (aged 22)	3	0	–	–
(South Africa) Jacques Engelbrecht	Number eight	10 June 1985 (aged 30)	102	40	31	25
(South Africa) Riaan Esterhuizen	Centre	8 August 1994 (aged 21)	–	–	–	–
(South Africa) Chuma Faas	Scrum-half	22 January 1990 (aged 26)	–	–	–	–
(South Africa) Tazz Fuzani	Lock	18 January 1991 (aged 25)	21	0	6	0
(South Africa) Wynand Grassmann	Lock	19 January 1995 (aged 21)	–	–	–	–
(South Africa) Liam Hendricks	Prop	31 May 1994 (aged 21)	–	–	–	–
(South Africa) Cornell Hess	Lock	1 March 1989 (aged 27)	51	0	12	0
(South Africa) Justin Hollis	Flanker	17 October 1995 (aged 20)	–	–	–	–
(South Africa) Gerrit Huisamen	Lock	7 March 1995 (aged 21)	–	–	–	–
(South Africa) Hannes Huisamen	Lock	9 April 1989 (aged 27)	–	–	–	–
(South Africa) Greg Jackson	Prop	7 March 1995 (aged 21)	–	–	–	–
(South Africa) JP Jamieson	Hooker	15 February 1995 (aged 21)	–	–	–	–
(South Africa) Andile Jho	Centre	21 April 1992 (aged 23)	10	0	10	0
(South Africa) Somila Jho	Centre	25 August 1995 (aged 20)	–	–	–	–
(South Africa) JP Jonck	Flanker	7 December 1991 (aged 24)	8	0	–	–
(South Africa) Jordan Koekemoer	Fly-half	20 June 1996 (aged 19)	–	–	–	–
(South Africa) Rob Lyons	Lock	26 June 1996 (aged 19)	–	–	–	–
(South Africa) Sintu Manjezi	Lock / Flanker	7 April 1995 (aged 21)	–	–	–	–
(South Africa) Garrick Mattheus	Fly-half	23 March 1996 (aged 20)	–	–	–	–
(South Africa) Athi Mayinje	Winger	18 January 1996 (aged 20)	–	–	–	–
(South Africa) Jixie Molapo	Winger	2 January 1995 (aged 21)	–	–	–	–
(South Africa) Sphu Msutwana	Winger	31 October 1993 (aged 22)	6	0	6	0
(South Africa) David Murray	Prop	7 March 1995 (aged 21)	–	–	–	–
(South Africa) Rouche Nel	Scrum-half	26 March 1996 (aged 20)	–	–	–	–
(South Africa) Sibusiso Ngcokovane	Scrum-half	17 February 1996 (aged 20)	–	–	–	–
(South Africa) SF Nieuwoudt	Flanker	27 August 1996 (aged 19)	–	–	–	–
(South Africa) NJ Oosthuizen	Prop	19 November 1996 (aged 19)	–	–	–	–
(South Africa) Tyler Paul	Flanker	20 January 1995 (aged 21)	3	0	3	0
(South Africa) Yaw Penxe	Winger	3 April 1997 (aged 19)	–	–	–	–
(South Africa) Mabhutana Peter	Fullback / Winger	4 July 1996 (aged 19)	–	–	–	–
(South Africa) Junior Pokomela	Number eight	10 December 1996 (aged 19)	–	–	–	–
(South Africa) Jayson Reinecke	Flanker	8 December 1995 (aged 20)	–	–	–	–
(South Africa) Vukile Sofisa	Prop	6 April 1993 (aged 23)	5	0	5	0
(South Africa) Warren Swarts	Fly-half	12 December 1994 (aged 21)	–	–	–	–
(South Africa) Hayden Tharratt	Flanker	16 February 1996 (aged 20)	–	–	–	–
(South Africa) Franswa Ueckermann	Scrum-half	6 January 1994 (aged 22)	–	–	–	–
(South Africa) Jaco van Tonder	Fullback	7 April 1991 (aged 25)	21	28	–	–
(South Africa) Roché van Zyl	Prop	14 June 1996 (aged 19)	–	–	–	–
(South Africa) Warrick Venter	Hooker	12 February 1993 (aged 23)	–	–	–	–
(South Africa) Keanu Vers	Fullback	4 February 1996 (aged 20)	–	–	–	–
(South Africa) Jeremy Ward	Centre	10 January 1996 (aged 20)	–	–	–	–
(South Africa) Elgar Watts	Fly-half	24 September 1985 (aged 30)	119	557	6	5
(South Africa) Courtney Winnaar	Fullback	27 March 1997 (aged 19)	–	–	–	–
(South Africa) Stephan Zaayman	Flanker	18 June 1993 (aged 22)	5	0	5	0
(South Africa) Lindelwe Zungu	Winger	16 May 1995 (aged 20)	–	–	–	–
Note: Players' ages and statistics are correct as of 9 April 2016, the date of the opening round of the competition. Appearances and points refer to the first class domestic competitions only. Appearances for Super Rugby franchises, at representative level or for foreign teams are not included.

=== Standings ===
The final log for the 2016 Currie Cup qualification tournament is:

2016 Currie Cup qualification log
Pos	Team	Pld	W	D	L	PF	PA	PD	TF	TA	TB	LB	Pts	Qualification
1	Western Province	14	13	0	1	548	303	+245	77	34	9	0	61	2016 Currie Cup Premier Division
2	Griquas	14	11	0	3	485	333	+152	63	47	11	1	56	2016 Currie Cup Premier Division
3	Boland Cavaliers	14	11	0	3	502	290	+212	67	38	9	1	54	2016 Currie Cup Premier Division
4	Pumas	14	10	0	4	417	261	+156	55	34	8	3	51	2016 Currie Cup Premier Division
5	Golden Lions XV	14	8	1	5	594	353	+241	83	45	10	3	47	2016 Currie Cup Premier Division
6	Free State XV	14	8	0	6	372	337	+35	52	41	8	4	44	2016 Currie Cup Premier Division
7	Blue Bulls	14	7	0	7	459	376	+83	65	45	8	2	38	2016 Currie Cup Premier Division
8	Leopards	14	6	0	8	448	450	−2	58	62	10	3	37	2016 Currie Cup First Division
9	Griffons	14	7	0	7	519	498	+21	69	70	8	0	36	2016 Currie Cup First Division
10	Sharks XV	14	6	0	8	338	399	−61	43	58	6	3	33	2016 Currie Cup Premier Division
11	SWD Eagles	14	5	0	9	409	365	+44	52	44	6	4	30	2016 Currie Cup First Division
12	Falcons	14	5	0	9	407	473	−66	57	64	6	4	30	2016 Currie Cup First Division
13	Border Bulldogs	14	5	0	9	364	424	−60	49	55	5	1	26	2016 Currie Cup First Division
14	Eastern Province Kings	14	2	1	11	278	513	−235	35	72	3	0	13	2016 Currie Cup Premier Division
15	Welwitschias	14	0	0	14	171	936	−765	25	141	1	0	1	2016 Currie Cup First Division

Rules for classification: 4 points for a win; 2 points for a draw; 1 bonus point for a loss by seven points or less; 1 bonus point for scoring four or more tries in a match.
The six franchise teams, plus the three highest-placed non-franchise teams will qualify to the 2016 Currie Cup Premier Division, the remaining six teams will qualify to the 2016 Currie Cup First Division.

=== Round-by-round ===
Team Progression – 2016 Currie Cup qualification
Team	R1	R2	R3	R4	R5	R6	R7	R8	R9	R10	R11	R12	R13	R14	R15	R16
Opposition	SWD	BOL	BDR	WEL	BUL	WPr	FSC	LIO	SHA	Bye	Bye	PMA	GRQ	LEO	GRF	GFA
Cumulative Points	0	0	0	5	9	9	9	12	12	12	12	12	12	12	12	13
Position	15th	14th	14th	13th	11th	13th	13th	13th	14th	14th	14th	14th	14th	14th	14th	14th
Key:	win	draw	loss													

=== Matches ===
The following matches were played in the 2016 Currie Cup qualification series:

9 April 2016	Eastern Province Kings	14–37	SWD Eagles	Nelson Mandela Bay Stadium, Port Elizabeth
16:30	Try: penalty try 1'; Jeremy Ward 65'; Con: Michael Brink 2', 65' (2/2)	Report; Scoreboard	Try: Daniel Roberts 3'; Martin du Toit 19'; Riaan Arends 53'; Leighton Eksteen 75'; Con: Hansie Graaff 4', 20', 54' (3/3); Jacquin Jansen 76' (1/1); Pen: Hansie Graaff 47', 49', 62' (3/3); Cards: Mzo Dyantyi (yellow card) 2' to 12'	Attendance: 1,346; Referee: Craig Joubert

16 April 2016	Boland Cavaliers	37–18	Eastern Province Kings	Boland Stadium, Wellington
16:00	Try: Ockie van Zyl 3'; Chadley Wenn 17'; Zandré Jordaan 54'; Danwel Demas 64', 70'; Con: Nico Scheepers 4', 18', 71' (3/5); Pen: Nico Scheepers 24', 44' (2/2)	Report; Scoreboard	Try: Somila Jho 33'; Courtney Winnaar 58'; Con: Courtney Winnaar (0/1); Simon Bolze 59' (1/1); Pen: Courtney Winnaar 13', 20' (2/3); Simon Bolze (0/1); Cards: Tazz Fuzani (yellow card) 16' to 26'; Sintu Manjezi (yellow card) 51' to 61'	Referee: Francois Pretorius

23 April 2016	Eastern Province Kings	14–28	Border Bulldogs	Nelson Mandela Bay Stadium, Port Elizabeth
14:00	Try: Simon Bolze 30'; Courtney Winnaar 80'; Con: Simon Bolze 31' (1/1); Courtney Winnaar 81' (1/1); Cards: Franswa Ueckermann (yellow card) 43' to 53'	Report; Scoreboard	Try: Michael Makase 46'; Siyamthanda Ngande 60'; Ludwe Booi 71'; Oliver Zono 77'; Con: Oliver Zono 47', 61', 72', 78' (4/4); Pen: Masixole Banda (0/1); Oliver Zono (0/2)	Referee: AJ Jacobs

30 April 2016	Welwitschias	18–31	Eastern Province Kings	Hage Geingob Stadium, Windhoek
16:00	Try: Johann Tromp 20', 57'; Con: Shaun Kaizemi 58' (1/2); Pen: Shaun Kaizemi 38', 45' (2/2); Cards: Shaun du Preez (yellow card) 14' to 24'; Leneve Damens (yellow card) 15' to 25'	Report; Scoreboard	Try: SF Nieuwoudt 9'; Courtney Winnaar 17'; Somila Jho 34'; Sphu Msutwana 51'; Athi Mayinje 74'; Con: Simon Bolze 18' (1/2); Athi Mayinje 35', 75' (2/3)	Referee: Pro Legoete

7 May 2016	Eastern Province Kings	19–14	Blue Bulls	Nelson Mandela Bay Stadium, Port Elizabeth
14:15	Try: Liam Hendricks 30'; Con: Garrick Mattheus 31' (1/1); Pen: Garrick Mattheus 4', 25', 45', 50' (4/5); Drop: Garrick Mattheus (0/1)	Report; Scoreboard	Try: Joshua Stander 15'; Dean Greyling 54'; Con: Joshua Stander 16', 55' (2/2); Cards: Nqoba Mxoli (yellow card) 49' to 59'	Referee: Rasta Rasivhenge

14 May 2016	Western Province	50–10	Eastern Province Kings	City Park Stadium, Athlone
16:00	Try: Frans van Wyk 8'; Devon Williams 14'; Justin Phillips 34'; Daniël du Plessis 43'; Scott van Breda 46', 55'; Mike Willemse 51'; Luke Stringer 69'; Con: Grant Hermanus 15' (1/3); Scott van Breda 44', 47', 52', 56' (4/5); Cards: Meyer Swanepoel (yellow card) 49' to 60'	Report; Scoreboard	Try: Andile Jho 37'; Con: Garrick Mattheus 38' (1/1); Pen: Garrick Mattheus 1' (1/2); Cards: Martin Bezuidenhout (yellow card) 49' to 60'	Referee: Stephan Geldenhuys

20 May 2016	Eastern Province Kings	15–35	Free State XV	Nelson Mandela Bay Stadium, Port Elizabeth
17:00	Try: Athi Mayinje 27'; Somila Jho 78'; Con: Michael Brink 28' (1/1); Jordan Koekemoer (0/1); Pen: Michael Brink 6' (1/2); Cards: Vukile Sofisa (yellow card) 67' to 77'	Report; Scoreboard	Try: Joseph Dweba 8', 39'; Ruan van Rensburg 17'; Elandré Huggett 68'; BG Uys 72'; Con: Sias Ebersohn 9', 18', 40', 69', 73' (5/5)	Referee: Rodney Boneparte

28 May 2016	Golden Lions XV	35–35	Eastern Province Kings	Pirates Rugby Club, Greenside
15:00	Try: Bobby de Wee 16'; Ruaan Lerm 24'; Ramone Samuels 63'; Ricky Schroeder 73'; Con: Shaun Reynolds 17', 25', 74' (3/4); Pen: Shaun Reynolds 32', 39', 46' (3/4); Cards: Bobby de Wee (yellow card) 51' to 61'	Report; Scoreboard	Try: Somila Jho 22' penalty try 51'; Greg Jackson 69'; JP Jonck 80'; Con: Garrick Mattheus 23', 52', 70' (3/4); Pen: Garrick Mattheus 6', 30', 57' (3/5); Cards: Sphu Msutwana (yellow card) 71'	Referee: Lourens van der Merwe

3 June 2016	Eastern Province Kings	26–34	Sharks XV	Nelson Mandela Bay Stadium, Port Elizabeth
19:00	Try: Garrick Mattheus 12'; Franswa Ueckermann 69'; Con: Garrick Mattheus 13', 70' (2/2); Pen: Garrick Mattheus 2', 18', 26', 43' (4/5); Cards: Martin Bezuidenhout (yellow card) 39' to 49'	Report; Scoreboard	Try: Khaya Majola 20'; Ruan Botha 28'; Heimar Williams 46'; Alrin Eksteen 49'; Wandile Mjekevu 75'; Con: Marcel Coetzee 29', 50', 76' (3/5); Pen: Marcel Coetzee 16' (1/3)	Referee: Marius van der Westhuizen

24 June 2016	Pumas	53–20	Eastern Province Kings	Mbombela Stadium, Mbombela
17:00	Try: Frank Herne 10', 18'; De-Jay Terblanche 32'; Lambert Groenewald 38', 55', 62'; Reuben Johannes 69'; Deon Helberg 75'; Con: Justin van Staden 11', 19', 39', 70', 76' (5/8); Pen: Justin van Staden 14' (1/1); Cards: Reynier van Rooyen (yellow card) 41' to 51'	Report; Scoreboard	Try: Yaw Penxe 1'; Somila Jho 42'; Courtney Winnaar 59'; Con: Michael Brink 44' (1/3); Pen: Michael Brink 24' (1/1); Cards: Warrick Venter (yellow card) 23' to 33'; Courtney Winnaar (yellow card) 36' to 45'	Referee: Lourens van der Merwe

2 July 2016	Eastern Province Kings	12–29	Griquas	Nelson Mandela Bay Stadium, Port Elizabeth
16:00	Try: Lusanda Badiyana 52'; JP Jamieson 79'; Con: Garrick Mattheus 53' (1/2); Drop: Garrick Mattheus (0/1); Cards: Cornell Hess (yellow card) 18' to 28'	Report; Scoreboard	Try: Ntabeni Dukisa 4', 32'; Alshaun Bock 23'; André Swarts 58'; Con: André Swarts 24', 33', 59' (3/4); Pen: André Swarts 19' (1/1)	Referee: Jaco van Heerden

8 July 2016	Leopards	54–14	Eastern Province Kings	Olën Park, Potchefstroom
15:00	Try: Jaco Hayward 2', 5'; Rowayne Beukman 16'; Gene Willemse 35'; Benhard Janse van Rensburg 47'; Juan Language 51', 79'; Ryno Wepener 69'; Con: Benhard Janse van Rensburg 3', 6', 17', 36', 48' (5/6); Schalk Hugo 70', 80' (2/2)	Report; Scoreboard	Try: Tazz Fuzani 21'; JP Jonck 57'; Con: Garrick Mattheus 22', 58' (2/2); Pen: Garrick Mattheus (0/1); Cards: Wihan Coetzer (yellow card) 67' to 77'	Referee: Juan Sylvestre

15 July 2016	Eastern Province Kings	24–32	Griffons	Nelson Mandela Bay Stadium, Port Elizabeth
15:00	Try: penalty try 38'; Lindelwe Zungu 51'; Garrick Mattheus 76'; Con: Simon Bolze 39', 52' (2/2); Garrick Mattheus 77' (1/1); Pen: Simon Bolze 8' (1/1)	Scoreboard	Try: Selvyn Davids 22', 78'; Warren Williams 33'; Japie Nel 64'; Con: Duan Pretorius 23', 34', 65' (3/4); Pen: Duan Pretorius 1', 18' (2/2); Cards: Selvyn Davids (yellow card) 39' to 49'	Referee: Pro Legoete

22 July 2016	Falcons	59–26	Eastern Province Kings	Barnard Stadium, Kempton Park
15:00	Try: Grant Janke 9', 67'; Etienne Taljaard 13', 80'; Shane Kirkwood 24'; Andries Schutte 34'; Johan Pretorius 49', 52'; Karlo Aspeling 76'; Con: Warren Potgieter 10', 25', 35' (3/4); Karlo Aspeling 53', 68', 77', 81' (4/5); Cards: Ernst Ladendorf (yellow card) 57' to 67'; Etienne Taljaard (yellow card) 69' to 79'	Scoreboard	Try: Keanu Vers 18'; David Murray 38'; Lusanda Badiyana 41'; Franswa Ueckermann 57'; Con: Simon Bolze 19', 39', 58' (3/4)	Referee: Marius van der Westhuizen

=== Player Appearances ===
The player appearance record in the 2016 Currie Cup qualification series was as follows:

Eastern Province Kings
Name	SWD	BOL	BDR	WEL	BUL	WPr	FSC	LIO	SHA	PMA	GRQ	LEO	GRF	GFA	App	Try	Kck	Pts
David Murray	1	1			17 (substituted on)	1					1	1	1	1	8	1	0	5
Warrick Venter	2	2	2	2	16 (substituted on)		2		16 (substituted on)	2	2			2	10	0	0	0
Louis Albertse	3	3	3	3	3		3	3	3	3					9	0	0	0
Philip du Preez	4	18 (substituted on)	18 (substituted on)	18 (substituted on)	18 (substituted on)	5	18	18							6	0	0	0
Tazz Fuzani	5	4	4	4		4	4	4	4	4	4	4			11	1	0	5
JP Jonck	6	6	6		6			6	6	6	19 (substituted on)	6			9	2	0	10
Sintu Manjezi	7	7	7	7	4	7	7	7	7	5	7			7	12	0	0	0
Junior Pokomela	8	8	8												3	0	0	0
Chuma Faas	9		20 (substituted on)	20 (substituted on)		20 (substituted on)									4	0	0	0
Michael Brink	10						10	15	15	15			12	15	7	0	14	14
Athi Mayinje	11	22 (substituted on)	14	14	14	14	11	14	14			14			10	2	4	14
Jeremy Ward	12		12		12									12	4	1	0	5
Somila Jho	13	13	13	13	22	13	13	13	13	13	13	13	22 (substituted on)	22 (substituted on)	13	5	0	25
Jixie Molapo	14	14									14				3	0	0	0
Keanu Vers	15		22 (substituted on)										14	14	4	1	0	5
JP Jamieson	16 (substituted on)	16 (substituted on)		16 (substituted on)		16 (substituted on)	16 (substituted on)	2		16 (substituted on)	16 (substituted on)	2	16 (substituted on)	16 (substituted on)	11	1	0	5
Vukile Sofisa	17 (substituted on)	17 (substituted on)		17 (substituted on)		17 (substituted on)	17 (substituted on)	17	17 (substituted on)	17 (substituted on)	3			3	9	0	0	0
Stephan Zaayman	18 (substituted on)			19 (substituted on)	19 (substituted on)	6	8		18 (substituted on)	7					7	0	0	0
SF Nieuwoudt	19 (substituted on)	19 (substituted on)	19 (substituted on)	6	7			19 (substituted on)		19 (substituted on)	6	7			9	1	0	5
Cornell Hess	20 (substituted on)	5	5	5	5		5	5	5	18 (substituted on)	5	5			11	0	0	0
Davron Cameron	21 (substituted on)	20 (substituted on)		9											3	0	0	0
Courtney Winnaar	22 (substituted on)	15	15	15						10					5	4	8	28
Franswa Ueckermann		9	9		9		9	9	9				9	9	8	2	0	10
Simon Bolze		10	10	10							21 (substituted on)	22 (substituted on)	10	10	7	1	21	26
Lindelwe Zungu		11	11	11	15	15	15	11	11	11	11	11	15	11	13	1	0	5
Sphu Msutwana		12		21 (substituted on)	11	11	14	12	21 (substituted on)	21 (substituted on)	22 (substituted on)	21 (substituted on)	13	13	12	1	0	5
Riaan Esterhuizen		21 (substituted on)	21 (substituted on)				12		12						4	0	0	0
NJ Oosthuizen			1										3	17 (substituted on)	3	0	0	0
Tango Balekile			16 (substituted on)									16 (substituted on)	2		3	0	0	0
Greg Jackson			17 (substituted on)					16 (substituted on)							2	1	0	5
Liam Hendricks				1	1		1	1	1	1	17 (substituted on)	3			8	1	0	5
Jacques Engelbrecht				8	8	8			8						4	0	0	0
JP du Plessis				12	13					12	12	12			5	0	0	0
Yaw Penxe				22 (substituted on)		22 (substituted on)		21		14					3	1	0	5
Martin Bezuidenhout					2	2			2						3	0	0	0
Garrick Mattheus					10	10		10	10	22 (substituted on)	10	10	21 (substituted on)		8	2	56	66
Sibusiso Ngcokovane					20 (substituted on)	9	20			20 (substituted on)	20 (substituted on)	9		20 (substituted on)	6	0	0	0
Jordan Koekemoer					21 (substituted on)	21 (substituted on)	21 (substituted on)								3	0	0	0
Roché van Zyl						3						17	17 (substituted on)		2	0	0	0
Andile Jho						12									1	1	0	5
Gerrit Huisamen						18 (substituted on)	19 (substituted on)								2	0	0	0
Lusanda Badiyana						19 (substituted on)	6	8	19 (substituted on)	8	8	8	8	8	9	2	0	10
Mabhutana Peter							22 (substituted on)						11	21 (substituted on)	3	0	0	0
Rouche Nel								20	20 (substituted on)	9	9	20 (substituted on)	20 (substituted on)		5	0	0	0
Ivan-John du Preez								22 (substituted on)	22 (substituted on)						2	0	0	0
Jaco van Tonder											15	15			2	0	0	0
Rob Lyons											18 (substituted on)	18 (substituted on)	6	6	4	0	0	0
Wihan Coetzer												19 (substituted on)			1	0	0	0
Hannes Huisamen													4	5	2	0	0	0
Wynand Grassmann													5	4	2	0	0	0
Jayson Reinecke													7	19 (substituted on)	2	0	0	0
Justin Hollis													18 (substituted on)		1	0	0	0
Stephan Deyzel													19 (substituted on)		1	0	0	0
Brandon Brown														18 (substituted on)	1	0	0	0
penalty try															–	3	–	15
Total															14	35	103	278
Thaki Boloko, Tyler Paul, Warren Swarts, Hayden Tharratt and Elgar Watts were named in the Currie Cup qualification squad, but not included in a matchday squad.

== Currie Cup Premier Division ==
=== Squad ===
The following players were named in the Eastern Province Kings squad for 2016 Currie Cup Premier Division:

2016 Eastern Province Kings Currie Cup Premier Division squad
Player	Position/s	Date of birth (age)	First class		EP Kings	
Player	Position/s	Date of birth (age)	Apps	Pts	Apps	Pts
(South Africa) David Antonites	Lock	25 March 1991 (aged 25)	2	0	–	–
(South Africa) Martin Bezuidenhout	Hooker	21 August 1989 (aged 26)	88	50	3	0
(South Africa) Dolph Botha	Prop	15 January 1993 (aged 23)	8	0	–	–
(South Africa) Brandon Brown	Flanker	16 November 1994 (aged 21)	1	0	1	0
(South Africa) Cullen Collopy	Hooker	12 January 1993 (aged 23)	7	10	–	–
(South Africa) Christiaan de Bruin	Number eight	20 January 1993 (aged 23)	17	0	–	–
(South Africa) Pieter-Steyn de Wet	Fly-half	8 January 1991 (aged 25)	22	99	–	–
(South Africa) Schalk Ferreira	Prop	9 February 1984 (aged 32)	80	15	21	5
(South Africa) Sebastian Ferreira	Lock / flanker	10 February 1994 (aged 22)	–	–	–	–
(South Africa) Jacques Fick	Scrum-half	29 March 1994 (aged 22)	–	–	–	–
(South Africa) Justin Forwood	Prop	19 September 1993 (aged 22)	2	0	–	–
(South Africa) Tazz Fuzani	Lock	18 January 1991 (aged 25)	32	5	17	5
(South Africa) Lungelo Gosa	Fly-half / fullback	31 January 1995 (aged 21)	–	–	–	–
(Namibia) JC Greyling	Centre	21 June 1991 (aged 25)	19	10	–	–
(South Africa) Dirk Grobbelaar	Number eight	8 February 1992 (aged 24)	15	0	–	–
(South Africa) Hannes Huisamen	Lock	9 April 1989 (aged 27)	2	0	2	0
(Namibia) Alcino Izaacs	Winger	16 November 1993 (aged 22)	25	20	–	–
(South Africa) Vince Jobo	Flanker	1 February 1991 (aged 25)	18	25	–	–
(South Africa) Berton Klaasen	Centre	24 January 1990 (aged 26)	28	10	–	–
(South Africa) Kobus Marais	Fly-half	5 July 1994 (aged 22)	11	85	–	–
(South Africa) Sampie Mastriet	Winger	3 August 1990 (aged 26)	58	160	–	–
(South Africa) Ganfried May	Fullback	25 July 1994 (aged 22)	3	0	–	–
(South Africa) Sphu Msutwana	Winger	31 October 1993 (aged 22)	18	5	18	5
(South Africa) Minenhle Mthethwa	Winger	5 August 1991 (aged 25)	–	–	–	–
(South Africa) Waylon Murray	Centre	27 April 1986 (aged 30)	95	125	1	0
(South Africa) Caylib Oosthuizen	Prop	1 September 1989 (aged 26)	22	0	–	–
(South Africa) Etienne Oosthuizen	Flanker	20 July 1994 (aged 22)	–	–	–	–
(South Africa) Dylan Pieterse	Lock	28 January 1995 (aged 21)	–	–	–	–
(South Africa) Barend Potgieter	Prop	28 December 1994 (aged 21)	8	10	–	–
(South Africa) Ricky Schroeder	Scrum-half	5 January 1991 (aged 25)	51	10	–	–
(South Africa) Vukile Sofisa	Prop	6 April 1993 (aged 23)	14	0	14	0
(South Africa) Siviwe Soyizwapi	Outside back	7 December 1992 (aged 23)	28	40	28	40
(South Africa) Pieter Stemmet	Prop	18 February 1992 (aged 24)	18	15	6	5
(Namibia) Johann Tromp	Centre / Fullback	23 December 1990 (aged 25)	14	41	–	–
(Namibia) Luke van der Smit	Flanker	29 June 1994 (aged 22)	4	5	–	–
(South Africa) Vian van der Watt	Scrum-half	18 November 1992 (aged 23)	10	10	–	–
(South Africa) Warrick Venter	Hooker	12 February 1993 (aged 23)	10	0	10	0
(South Africa) Mike Willemse	Hooker	14 February 1993 (aged 23)	31	20	–	–
Note: Players' ages and statistics are correct as of 5 August 2016, the date of the opening round of the competition. Appearances and points refer to the first class domestic competitions only. Appearances for Super Rugby franchises, at representative level or for foreign teams are not included.

=== Standings ===
The final log for the 2016 Currie Cup Premier Division was: (Note: According to the match report summary on the South African Rugby Union website, the Sharks scored five tries in their match against Griquas; however, according to the detailed scorecard, they scored six tries. Similarly, the match report summary indicates that the Blue Bulls scored eight tries in their match against Griquas, while the detailed scorecard lists nine tries. These missing tries are also missing from the log on the official website, and have been added into the log below.)

2016 Currie Cup Premier Division log
Pos	Team	Pld	W	D	L	PF	PA	PD	TF	TA	TB	LB	Pts	Qualification
1	Free State Cheetahs	8	8	0	0	366	181	+185	49	18	7	0	39	Semi-finals
2	Blue Bulls	8	6	0	2	310	207	+103	40	26	5	1	30	Semi-finals
3	Western Province	8	5	0	3	266	250	+16	35	29	6	1	27	Semi-finals
4	Golden Lions	8	5	0	3	355	191	+164	49	23	5	1	26	Semi-finals
5	Sharks	8	5	0	3	272	173	+99	33	21	4	1	25	
6	Griquas	8	4	0	4	265	323	−58	33	43	5	0	21	
7	Boland Cavaliers	8	2	0	6	177	301	−124	24	41	3	1	12	Relegated
8	Pumas	8	1	0	7	178	321	−143	24	43	4	2	10	
9	Eastern Province Kings	8	0	0	8	137	379	−242	16	59	1	0	1	Relegated

Rules for classification: 4 points for a win; 2 points for a draw; 1 bonus point for a loss by seven points or less; 1 bonus point for scoring four or more tries in a match

=== Round-by-round ===
Team Progression – 2016 Currie Cup Premier Division
Team	R1	R2	R3	R4	R1 (Note: The Griquas v Eastern Province Kings from Round One was rescheduled between Rounds Four and Five.)	R5	R6	R7	R8	R9	SF	F
Opposition	Bye	BOL	BUL	WPr	GRQ	FSC	Bye	SHA	LIO	PMA	—N/a	—N/a
Cumulative Points	0	0	1	1	1	1	1	1	1	1	—N/a	—N/a
Position	5th	8th	8th	9th	9th	9th	9th	9th	9th	9th	—N/a	—N/a
Key:	win	draw	loss									

=== Matches ===
The following matches were played in the 2016 Currie Cup Premier Division:

12 August 2016	Eastern Province Kings	10–28	Boland Cavaliers	Nelson Mandela Bay Stadium, Port Elizabeth
17:00	Try: Johann Tromp 74'; Con: Lungelo Gosa 75' (1/1); Pen: Kobus Marais 36' (1/3); Cards: Tazz Fuzani (yellow card) 18' to 28'; Alcino Izaacs (yellow card) 59' to 69'	Report; Scoreboard	Try: Sergio Torrens 24'; Zandré Jordaan 46'; Christopher Bosch 64'; Kenan Cronjé 69'; Con: Nico Scheepers 25', 47', 65', 70' (4/4); Pen: Nico Scheepers (0/1)	Attendance: 464; Referee: Rodney Boneparte

19 August 2016	Blue Bulls	49–35	Eastern Province Kings	Loftus Versfeld, Pretoria
19:20	Try: Tian Schoeman 12'; Jamba Ulengo 19', 64'; Jannes Kirsten 28'; Bjorn Basson 32'; Burger Odendaal 59'; Joshua Stander 70'; Con: Tian Schoeman 13', 20', 29', 33', 60', 65', 71' (7/7); Cards: RG Snyman (yellow card) 32'	Report; Scoreboard	Try: Mike Willemse 1'; Berton Klaasen 5'; Johann Tromp 39'; Siviwe Soyizwapi 54'; Martin Bezuidenhout 67'; Con: Kobus Marais 2', 6' (2/4); Lungelo Gosa (0/1); Pen: Kobus Marais 24', 32' (2/2)	Attendance: 2,800; Referee: Rasta Rasivhenge

27 August 2016	Eastern Province Kings	6–36	Western Province	Nelson Mandela Bay Stadium, Port Elizabeth
16:00	Pen: Kobus Marais 3', 32' (2/2); Cards: Christiaan de Bruin (yellow card) 23' to 33'; Etienne Oosthuizen (yellow card) 39'	Report; Scoreboard	Try: Leolin Zas 11'; Huw Jones 18', 72', 75'; Sikhumbuzo Notshe 40'; Jano Vermaak 58'; Con: Brandon Thomson 12', 59', 76' (3/6)	Referee: Pro Legoete

31 August 2016	Griquas	47–24	Eastern Province Kings	Griqua Park, Kimberley
17:00	Try: Wandile Putuma 17'; Jono Janse van Rensburg 29'; Ederies Arendse 46'; Alshaun Bock 49'; AJ Coertzen 52', 68'; Eric Zana 74'; Con: Clinton Swart 18', 30', 47', 50', 53' (5/5); André Swarts 75' (1/2)	Report; Scoreboard	Try: Alcino Izaacs 21', 38'; Cullen Collopy 79'; Con: Lungelo Gosa 22', 39' (2/2); Pieter-Steyn de Wet 80' (1/1); Pen: Lungelo Gosa 36' (1/1); Cards: Siviwe Soyizwapi (yellow card) 73'	Attendance: 1,200; Referee: AJ Jacobs

3 September 2016	Free State Cheetahs	57–25	Eastern Province Kings	Free State Stadium, Bloemfontein
15:00	Try: Nico Lee 20', 71'; Tom Botha 26'; Paul Schoeman 32', 53'; Charles Marais 59', 78'; Niel Marais 68'; Ox Nché 75'; Con: Fred Zeilinga 27' (1/4); Niel Marais 72', 75' (2/5); Pen: Fred Zeilinga 14', 18' (2/3)	Report; Scoreboard	Try: JC Greyling 11'; Berton Klaasen 76'; Vince Jobo 82'; Con: Pieter-Steyn de Wet 12' (1/1); Kobus Marais 83' (1/2); Pen: Pieter-Steyn de Wet 31' (1/1); Drop: Pieter-Steyn de Wet 58' (1/1)	Attendance: 3,710; Referee: Jaco van Heerden

17 September 2016	Sharks	53–0	Eastern Province Kings	Kings Park Stadium, Durban
15:00	Try: André Esterhuizen 4'; Chiliboy Ralepelle 13'; Jean-Luc du Preez 18'; Inny Radebe 31'; Michael Claassens 44'; Francois Kleinhans 48'; Etienne Oosthuizen 54'; Wandile Mjekevu 60'; Khaya Majola 80'; Con: Curwin Bosch 14', 32' (2/5); Patrick Lambie 50', 81' (2/4)	Report; Scoreboard		Attendance: 5,186; Referee: Cwengile Jadezweni

24 September 2016	Eastern Province Kings	7–71	Golden Lions	Nelson Mandela Bay Stadium, Port Elizabeth
17:10	Try: Sampie Mastriet 22'; Con: Pieter-Steyn de Wet 23' (1/1)	Report; Scoreboard	Try: Ruan Ackermann 18'; Howard Mnisi 30', 69'; Koch Marx 38'; Kwagga Smith 40', 63', 66'; Anthony Volmink 42'; Jacques Nel 45', 80'; Sylvian Mahuza 76'; Con: Jaco van der Walt 19', 39', 40', 43', 64' (5/7); Andries Coetzee 70', 77', 81' (3/4)	Referee: Cwengile Jadezweni

30 September 2016	Eastern Province Kings	30–38	Pumas	Nelson Mandela Bay Stadium, Port Elizabeth
18:00	Try: Johann Tromp 17'; Brandon Brown 28'; Ricky Schroeder 46'; Con: Pieter-Steyn de Wet 18', 29', 47' (3/3); Pen: Pieter-Steyn de Wet 2', 8', 63' (3/3); Cards: Brandon Brown (yellow card) 38' to 48'; Etienne Oosthuizen (yellow card) 70'	Report; Scoreboard	Try: Brian Shabangu 11'; Frank Herne 23', 38', 71'; Kevin Luiters 58'; JP Lewis 78'; Con: Heinrich Steyl 24', 39' (2/3); Devon Williams 72', 79' (2/3); Cards: Carel Greeff (yellow card) 44' to 54'	Attendance: 791; Referee: Quinton Immelman

=== Player Appearances ===
The player appearance record in the 2016 Currie Cup Premier Division was as follows:

Eastern Province Kings
Name	BOL	BUL	WPr	GRQ	FSC	SHA	LIO	PMA	SF	F	App	Try	Kck	Pts
Schalk Ferreira (c)	1								—N/a	—N/a	1	0	0	0
Mike Willemse	2	2	2		2				—N/a	—N/a	4	1	0	5
Vukile Sofisa	3	3	3		3	17 (substituted on)	17 (substituted on)	3	—N/a	—N/a	7	0	0	0
Tazz Fuzani	4	4	4					4	—N/a	—N/a	4	0	0	0
David Antonites	5	5					4		—N/a	—N/a	3	0	0	0
Vince Jobo	6	6	6		6	6	19 (substituted on)		—N/a	—N/a	6	1	0	5
Sebastian Ferreira	7	7	5		5	5	5	7	—N/a	—N/a	7	0	0	0
Christiaan de Bruin	8	8	8		8	8	8	8	—N/a	—N/a	7	0	0	0
Ricky Schroeder	9	9	9		9	9	9	9	—N/a	—N/a	7	1	0	5
Kobus Marais	10	10	10		21 (substituted on)				—N/a	—N/a	4	0	21	21
Sampie Mastriet	11	11	11		11	11	11	11	—N/a	—N/a	7	1	0	5
Waylon Murray	12	12				12	12	12	—N/a	—N/a	5	0	0	0
Johann Tromp	13	15	15		15		15	15	—N/a	—N/a	6	3	0	15
Alcino Izaacs	14			11		22 (substituted on)	14		—N/a	—N/a	4	2	0	10
Siviwe Soyizwapi	15	14	14	22 (substituted on)	14	14		14	—N/a	—N/a	7	1	0	5
Martin Bezuidenhout	16 (substituted on)	16 (substituted on)	16 (substituted on)	2	16 (substituted on)	2	2	2	—N/a	—N/a	8	1	0	5
Justin Forwood	17 (substituted on)	1	1		1	3	1		—N/a	—N/a	6	0	0	0
Dirk Grobbelaar	18 (substituted on)			8					—N/a	—N/a	2	0	0	0
Brandon Brown	19 (substituted on)		20 (substituted on)	7	19 (substituted on)	7	7	6	—N/a	—N/a	7	1	0	5
Jacques Fick	20 (substituted on)	20		9					—N/a	—N/a	2	0	0	0
Berton Klaasen	21 (substituted on)	13	12		12	13	13	13	—N/a	—N/a	7	2	0	10
Lungelo Gosa	22 (substituted on)	22 (substituted on)	21 (substituted on)	10		15	21 (substituted on)	22 (substituted on)	—N/a	—N/a	7	0	9	9
Barend Potgieter		17 (substituted on)	17 (substituted on)	1	17 (substituted on)	1		1	—N/a	—N/a	6	0	0	0
Etienne Oosthuizen		18 (substituted on)	7	18 (substituted on)	7	18 (substituted on)	18 (substituted on)	18 (substituted on)	—N/a	—N/a	7	0	0	0
Luke van der Smit		19 (substituted on)	19 (substituted on)	6		19 (substituted on)	6	19 (substituted on)	—N/a	—N/a	6	0	0	0
Minenhle Mthethwa		21 (substituted on)		14		21 (substituted on)			—N/a	—N/a	3	0	0	0
JC Greyling			13	12	13		22 (substituted on)		—N/a	—N/a	4	1	0	5
Dylan Pieterse			18 (substituted on)	5	4	4		5	—N/a	—N/a	5	0	0	0
Ganfried May			22 (substituted on)	15	22 (substituted on)				—N/a	—N/a	3	0	0	0
Pieter Stemmet				3			3	17 (substituted on)	—N/a	—N/a	3	0	0	0
Hannes Huisamen				4	18 (substituted on)				—N/a	—N/a	2	0	0	0
Sphu Msutwana				13					—N/a	—N/a	1	0	0	0
Warrick Venter				16 (substituted on)		16 (substituted on)		16	—N/a	—N/a	2	0	0	0
Caylib Oosthuizen				17 (substituted on)					—N/a	—N/a	1	0	0	0
Cullen Collopy				19 (substituted on)			16 (substituted on)	20	—N/a	—N/a	2	1	0	5
Vian van der Watt				20 (substituted on)	20 (substituted on)	20 (substituted on)	20 (substituted on)	21 (substituted on)	—N/a	—N/a	5	0	0	0
Pieter-Steyn de Wet				21 (substituted on)	10	10	10	10	—N/a	—N/a	5	0	27	27
Total											8	16	57	137
Dolph Botha was named in the Currie Cup Premier Division squad, but not included in a matchday squad.

== Under-21 ==
=== Squad ===
The following players were named in the Eastern Province U21 squad for the 2016 Under-21 Provincial Championship:

Eastern Province U21 squad
Forwards	Lusanda Badiyana • Wihan Coetzer • Wynand Grassmann • Jedwyn Harty • Justin Hollis • Gerrit Huisamen • JP Jamieson • Arno Lotter • Rob Lyons • David Murray • SF Nieuwoudt • NJ Oosthuizen • Jayson Reinecke • Hayden Tharratt • Roché van Zyl • Xandré Vos • Did not play: • Tango Balekile • JP Barkhuizen • Ronnie Beyl • Matt Howes • Sintu Manjezi • Tyler Paul • Junior Pokomela • Elandré van der Merwe
Backs	Simon Bolze • Michael Brink • Luvo Claassen • Malcolm Jaer • Somila Jho • Garrick Mattheus • Jixie Molapo • Rouche Nel • Sibusiso Ngcokovane • Luan Nieuwoudt • Mabhutana Peter • Stephen Rautenbach • Keanu Vers • Jeremy Ward • Lindelwe Zungu • Did not play: • Nathan Augustus • Davron Cameron • Avelo Jubase • Jordan Koekemoer • Athi Mayinje

=== Standings ===
The final league standings for the 2016 Under-21 Provincial Championship was:

2016 Under-21 Provincial Championship standings
Pos	Team	P	W	D	L	PF	PA	PD	TF	TA	TB	LB	Pts
1	Western Province U21	6	4	1	1	200	140	+60	28	17	6	1	25
2	Golden Lions U21	6	5	0	1	198	144	+54	22	21	2	1	23
3	Blue Bulls U21	6	3	1	2	185	171	+14	26	22	4	2	20
4	Free State U21	6	3	0	3	177	184	-7	24	21	4	1	17
5	Eastern Province U21	6	3	0	3	164	155	+9	19	19	2	2	16
6	Sharks U21	6	2	0	4	152	189	-37	20	25	2	2	12
7	Leopards U21	6	0	0	6	153	246	-93	22	36	4	2	6
Final standings.

Legend and competition rules
Legend:
The top four teams qualified to the semi-finals.	P = Games played, W = Games won, D = Games drawn, L = Games lost, PF = Points for, PA = Points against, PD = Points difference, TF = Tries for, TA = Tries against, TB = Try bonus points, LB = Losing bonus points, Pts = Log points
Competition rules:
Play-offs: The top four teams qualified to the semi-finals, with the higher-placed team having home advantage. Points breakdown: * 4 points for a win * 2 points for a draw * 1 bonus point for a loss by seven points or less * 1 bonus point for scoring four or more tries in a match

=== Round-by-round ===
Team Progression – 2016 Under-21 Provincial Championship
Team	R1	R2	R3	R4	R5	R6	R7	R8	Semi	Final
Opposition	Bye	SHA	Bye	LEO	BUL	WPR	FSC	LIO	—N/a	—N/a
Cumulative Points	0	4	4	9	10	10	15	16	—N/a	—N/a
Position	5th	3rd	6th	6th	5th	6th	5th	5th	—N/a	—N/a
Key:	win	draw	loss							

=== Matches ===
The following matches were played in the 2016 Currie Cup qualification series:

12 August 2016	Sharks U21	21–23	Eastern Province U21	Growthpoint Kings Park, Durban
17:10	Try: Tristan Blewett 21'; Marcel Coetzee 41'; Graham Geldenhuys 45'; Con: Jaywinn Juries 22' (1/1); Ruben de Vos 42', 46' (2/2); Pen: Jaywinn Juries (0/1); Cards: Ayron Schramm (yellow card) 24' to 34'	Report; Scoreboard	Try: JP Jamieson 12'; Malcolm Jaer 34'; Con: Garrick Mattheus 13', 35' (2/2); Pen: Garrick Mattheus 3', 16' (2/3); Simon Bolze (0/1); Malcolm Jaer 81' (1/1); Cards: Jeremy Ward (yellow card) 52' to 63'	Referee: Stephan Geldenhuys

26 August 2016	Eastern Province U21	38–3	Leopards U21	Nelson Mandela Bay Stadium, Port Elizabeth
15:00	Try: Somila Jho 3', 35'; Jayson Reinecke 11'; Lindelwe Zungu 16'; Malcolm Jaer 41'; Jeremy Ward 64'; Con: Garrick Mattheus 4', 12', 36', 42' (4/6)	Report; Scoreboard	Pen: Marco Donges 8' (1/1); Cards: Timothy Prince (yellow card) 49' to 59'	Referee: Ben Crouse

2 September 2016	Blue Bulls U21	34–27	Eastern Province U21	Loftus Versfeld, Pretoria
16:35	Try: Alandré van Rooyen 35'; Ivan van Zyl 45'; JT Jackson 52'; Mervano da Silva 71', 80'; Con: Tinus de Beer 53', 72', 81' (3/5); Pen: Tinus de Beer 51' (1/1); Cards: Theo Maree (yellow card) 66' to 78'	Report; Scoreboard	Try: Jeremy Ward 14'; Michael Brink 68'; Malcolm Jaer 78'; Con: Garrick Mattheus 15', 69', 78' (3/3); Pen: Garrick Mattheus 39', 55' (2/2); Cards: JP Jamieson (yellow card) 59' to 69'	Referee: Francois Pretorius

9 September 2016	Eastern Province U21	10–27	Western Province U21	Hoërskool Framesby, Port Elizabeth
15:00	Try: Jixie Molapo 15'; Con: Garrick Mattheus 16' (1/1); Pen: Simon Bolze 57' (1/1)	Report; Scoreboard	Try: Christo van der Merwe 29'; Herschel Jantjies 37'; Eduan Keyter 50'; Mitchell Carstens 70'; Con: Brandon Thomson 30', 38' (2/4); Pen: Brandon Thomson 10' (1/1); Cards: Ryan Oosthuizen (yellow card) 59' to 69'; Grant Hermanus (red card) 64'	Referee: Jaco Pretorius

15 September 2016	Free State U21	44–45	Eastern Province U21	Free State Stadium, Bloemfontein
16:45	Try: penalty try 19'; Nardus Erasmus 22'; Gerrie Labuschagné 49'; Dian Badenhorst 61'; Fiffy Rampeta 65'; Con: Heinrich Bitzi 20', 23', 50', 62', 66' (5/5); Pen: Heinrich Bitzi 8', 31', 75' (3/3); Cards: Ruben Schoeman (yellow card) 15' to 26'	Report; Scoreboard	Try: Keanu Vers 16', 43'; Malcolm Jaer 25'; Jixie Molapo 34'; Xandré Vos 80'; Con: Garrick Mattheus 17', 26', 44', 80' (4/5); Pen: Garrick Mattheus 12', 29', 39', 57' (4/4); Cards: Justin Hollis (yellow card) 21' to 29'	Attendance: 300; Referee: Jaco Peyper

24 September 2016	Eastern Province U21	21–26	Golden Lions U21	Nelson Mandela Bay Stadium, Port Elizabeth
14:30	Try: Garrick Mattheus 56'; Jixie Molapo 72'; Con: Garrick Mattheus 57' (1/2); Pen: Garrick Mattheus 9', 19', 39' (3/3); Drop: Garrick Mattheus (0/1)	Report; Scoreboard	Try: James Venter 26'; Jarryd Sage 52'; Con: Shaun Reynolds 27', 53' (2/2); Pen: Shaun Reynolds 2', 12', 75' (3/5); Kobus Engelbrecht 77' (1/1); Cards: Jo-Hanko de Villiers (yellow card) 80'	Referee: Egon Seconds

=== Player Appearances ===
The player appearance record in the 2016 Under-21 Provincial Championship is as follows:

Eastern Province U21
Name	SHA	LEO	BUL	WPR	FSC	LIO	SF	F	App	Try	Kck	Pts
David Murray	1	1	1	1		1	—N/a	—N/a	5	0	0	0
JP Jamieson	2	2	2	2	2	2	—N/a	—N/a	6	1	0	5
NJ Oosthuizen	3	17 (substituted on)	3	17 (substituted on)	3	3	—N/a	—N/a	6	0	0	0
Wynand Grassmann	4	4	4	4	4	4	—N/a	—N/a	6	0	0	0
Gerrit Huisamen	5	5	5	5	5	5	—N/a	—N/a	6	0	0	0
Jayson Reinecke	6	6	6	6	6	6	—N/a	—N/a	6	1	0	5
Rob Lyons	7	7		7		8	—N/a	—N/a	4	0	0	0
Lusanda Badiyana	8				8		—N/a	—N/a	2	0	0	0
Sibusiso Ngcokovane	9	9	9	9	9	9	—N/a	—N/a	6	0	0	0
Garrick Mattheus	10	10	10	10	10	10	—N/a	—N/a	6	1	63	68
Lindelwe Zungu	11	11	11	22 (substituted on)			—N/a	—N/a	4	1	0	5
Jeremy Ward	12	12	12	13	13	13	—N/a	—N/a	6	2	0	10
Somila Jho	13	13			22	22 (substituted on)	—N/a	—N/a	3	2	0	10
Keanu Vers	14	14	14		14	14	—N/a	—N/a	5	2	0	10
Malcolm Jaer	15	15	15	15	15	15	—N/a	—N/a	6	4	3	23
Arno Lotter	16 (substituted on)		19				—N/a	—N/a	1	0	0	0
Roché van Zyl	17 (substituted on)	3		3	17	17	—N/a	—N/a	3	0	0	0
Justin Hollis	18 (substituted on)	8	8	8	7	7	—N/a	—N/a	6	0	0	0
Jedwyn Harty	19 (substituted on)	16 (substituted on)	16 (substituted on)	16 (substituted on)	16 (substituted on)	16	—N/a	—N/a	5	0	0	0
Rouche Nel	20 (substituted on)			20 (substituted on)			—N/a	—N/a	2	0	0	0
Simon Bolze	21 (substituted on)			21 (substituted on)	21	21 (substituted on)	—N/a	—N/a	3	0	3	3
Mabhutana Peter	22 (substituted on)	22 (substituted on)	22 (substituted on)	14			—N/a	—N/a	4	0	0	0
Wihan Coetzer		18 (substituted on)	18 (substituted on)	18 (substituted on)	18 (substituted on)		—N/a	—N/a	4	0	0	0
Hayden Tharratt		19 (substituted on)	7	19 (substituted on)	19 (substituted on)	20 (substituted on)	—N/a	—N/a	5	0	0	0
Luvo Claassen		20 (substituted on)	20 (substituted on)		20		—N/a	—N/a	2	0	0	0
Michael Brink		21 (substituted on)	21 (substituted on)	12			—N/a	—N/a	3	1	0	5
Stephen Rautenbach			13				—N/a	—N/a	1	0	0	0
Ronnie Beyl			17				—N/a	—N/a	0	0	0	0
Jixie Molapo				11	11	11	—N/a	—N/a	3	3	0	15
Xandré Vos					1	18 (substituted on)	—N/a	—N/a	2	1	0	5
Luan Nieuwoudt					12	12	—N/a	—N/a	2	0	0	0
SF Nieuwoudt						19 (substituted on)	—N/a	—N/a	1	0	0	0
Total									6	19	69	164
Nathan Augustus, Tango Balekile, JP Barkhuizen, Davron Cameron, Matt Howes, Avelo Jubase, Jordan Koekemoer, Sintu Manjezi, Athi Mayinje, Tyler Paul, Junior Pokomela and Elandré van der Merwe were named in the Under-21 Provincial Championship squad, but not included in a matchday squad.

== Under-19 ==
=== Squad ===
The following players were named in the Eastern Province U19 squad for 2016 Under-19 Provincial Championship:

Eastern Province U19 squad
Forwards	Siyanda Am • Dylan Barendse • Liam Blake-Taylor • Temba Boltina • Michael de Marco • Kamva Dilima • Duan du Plessis • Apiwe Febana • Nico Grobler • Matthew King • André Lategan • Ruben le Roux • Leon Lyons • Sive Mazosiwe • Lupumlo Mguca • Thapelo Molapo • Lourens Oosthuizen • Janse Roux • Mylo Sadiki • Lutho Selem • Donavan Stevens • CJ van Niekerk • Grant Venter • Daniel Voigt • Shane Weweje • Did not play: • Connor Thalrose
Backs	Thaki Boloko • Jonathan Booysen • Michael Botha • Reinhardt Engelbrecht • Victor Foster • Oyisa Hackula • Yomi Keswa • Cliven Loubser • Malan Marais • Wayne Moss • Siba Mzanywa • Yaw Penxe • Leslie Sharp • Morgan Steyn • Louis Strydom • Josiah Twum-Boafo • Jac van der Walt • Riaan van Rensburg • Courtney Winnaar • Did not play: • Sihle Njezula

=== Standings ===
The final league standings for the 2016 Under-19 Provincial Championship was:

2016 Under-19 Provincial Championship standings
Pos	Team	P	W	D	L	PF	PA	PD	TF	TA	TB	LB	Pts
1	Western Province U19	12	10	0	2	493	278	+215	66	35	9	1	50
2	Blue Bulls U19	12	10	0	2	427	225	+202	62	27	8	2	50
3	Golden Lions U19	12	9	0	3	537	236	+301	73	30	8	2	46
4	Free State U19	12	6	0	6	366	308	+58	49	39	5	1	30
5	Sharks U19	12	4	0	8	294	426	−132	44	61	6	2	24
6	Eastern Province U19	12	3	0	9	308	497	−189	39	73	5	3	20
7	Leopards U19	12	0	0	12	167	622	−455	22	90	1	2	3
Final standings.

Legend and competition rules
Legend:
Top four teams qualified to the semi-finals.	P = Games played, W = Games won, D = Games drawn, L = Games lost, PF = Points for, PA = Points against, PD = Points difference, TF = Tries for, TA = Tries against, TB = Try bonus points, LB = Losing bonus points, Pts = Log points
Competition rules:
Play-offs: The top four teams qualified to the semi-finals, with the higher-placed team having home advantage. Points breakdown: * 4 points for a win * 2 points for a draw * 1 bonus point for a loss by seven points or less * 1 bonus point for scoring four or more tries in a match

=== Round-by-round ===
Team Progression – 2016 Under-19 Provincial Championship
Team	R1	R2	R3	R4	R5	R6	R7	R8	R9	R10	R11	R12	R13	R14	SF	F
Opposition	SHA	Bye	LEO	BUL	WPR	FSC	LIO	SHA	Bye	LEO	BUL	WPR	FSC	LIO	—N/a	—N/a
Cumulative Points	5	5	10	11	12	14	14	16	16	20	20	20	20	20	—N/a	—N/a
Position	2nd	4th	2nd	3rd	3rd	4th	5th	5th	5th	5th	5th	5th	6th	6th	—N/a	—N/a
Key:	win	draw	loss													

=== Matches ===
The following matches were played in the 2016 Currie Cup qualification series:

17 June 2016	Eastern Province U19	30–17	Sharks U19	Hoërskool Framesby, Port Elizabeth
15:00	Try: Victor Foster 25'; Duan du Plessis 39'; Yaw Penxe 45'; Courtney Winnaar 54'; Con: Victor Foster 46', 55' (2/4); Pen: Victor Foster 7', 18' (2/2); Cards: Jonathan Booysen (yellow card) 50' to 60'	Scoreboard	Try: Samuel Swanepoel 30'; Khuthu Mchunu 49'; Con: Gareth Simpson 31', 50' (2/2); Pen: Gareth Simpson 6' (1/1)	Referee: Pieter Maritz

1 July 2016	Leopards U19	36–39	Eastern Province U19	Olën Park, Potchefstroom
12:00	Try: Hein Steenkamp 23', 36'; Craig Ellis 33'; Ryno Visagie 54'; Con: Quintin Bayards 34' (1/3); Slabber la Grange 55' (1/1); Pen: Quintin Bayards 6', 12', 43' (3/3); Slabber La Grange 60' (1/1)	Scoreboard	Try: Jonathan Booysen 9'; Victor Foster 15', 35'; Yaw Penxe 45'; Daniel Voigt 48'; Con: Victor Foster 10', 16', 35', 49' (4/5); Pen: Victor Foster 31', 65' (2/4)	Referee: Ruhan Meiring

8 July 2016	Eastern Province U19	24–28	Blue Bulls U19	Hoërskool Framesby, Port Elizabeth
15:00	Try: Yaw Penxe 1', 32'; CJ van Niekerk 50'; Con: Victor Foster 2', 33', 51' (3/3); Pen: Victor Foster 59' (1/2); Cards: CJ van Niekerk (yellow card) 16'	Scoreboard	Try: Irvin Ali 14'; Luvuyo Ndevu 17', 46'; Nico Peyper 70'; Con: Louwtjie Steenkamp 18' (1/4); Pen: Louwtjie Steenkamp 6', 11' (2/2)	Referee: Sindile Ngcese

16 July 2016	Western Province U19	53–29	Eastern Province U19	DHL Newlands, Cape Town
12:00	Try: Jondré Williams 11', 28'; Ricky Nwagbara 19'; Tumi Mogoje 31', 43'; Tristan Leyds 37'; George Lourens 58'; David Brits 68'; Con: Jondré Williams 12', 29', 32', 59' (4/7); Troy Payne 69' (1/1); Pen: Jondré Williams 7' (1/2)	Scoreboard	Try: Courtney Winnaar 2', 33'; Jonathan Booysen 15'; Michael Botha 50'; Con: Victor Foster 16', 34', 51' (3/4); Pen: Victor Foster 39' (1/1); Cards: Mylo Sadiki (yellow card) 25' to 36'	Referee: Francois Pretorius

22 July 2016	Eastern Province U19	29–36	Free State U19	Hoërskool Framesby, Port Elizabeth
15:00	Try: Victor Foster 14', 30'; Yomi Keswa 44'; Mylo Sadiki 55'; Con: Cliven Loubser (0/1); Victor Foster 31', 45', 56' (3/3); Pen: Victor Foster 61' (1/1); Cards: Lupumlo Mguca (yellow card) 64'	Scoreboard	Try: Jurie Burger 7'; Sibabalo Qoma 17'; Marnus van der Merwe 39'; Berco Venter 47'; Jan Lourens Schreuder 58'; Abri Coetzee 65'; Con: Christiaan Schutte 18', 66' (2/5); Ruan Henning 59' (1/1)	Referee: Pieter Maritz

5 August 2016	Golden Lions U19	52–30	Eastern Province U19	Emirates Airline Park, Johannesburg
14:30	Try: Tyreeq February 11'; Bader Pretorius 24'; Stean Pienaar 28', 33'; Patrick Wait 38'; HP van Schoor 51'; Madosh Tambwe 55'; Len Massyn 61'; Con: Jeanluc Cilliers 12', 25', 29', 34', 38' (5/6); Bader Pretorius 56' (1/2); Cards: Reinhard Nothnagel (yellow card) 17' to 27'; Rouxbann Baumann (yellow card) 59' to 69'	Scoreboard	Try: Mylo Sadiki 36'; Jonathan Booysen 47'; Reinhardt Engelbrecht 57'; Con: Cliven Loubser 37', 48', 58' (3/3); Pen: Courtney Winnaar (0/1); Cliven Loubser 6', 19', 31' (3/3)	Referee: Lourens van der Merwe

12 August 2016	Sharks U19	45–41	Eastern Province U19	Growthpoint Kings Park, Durban
15:30	Try: Mfundu Ndhlovu 5'; André Coetzee 15'; Clifferd Jacobs 32'; Taigh Schoor 39', 58'; Francois de Villiers 50', 65'; Con: James Tedder 6', 33', 40', 51', 59' (5/7); Pen: James Tedder (0/1)	Scoreboard	Try: Michael Botha 3'; Yomi Keswa 8', 36'; Thaki Boloko 11'; Courtney Winnaar 19'; Jonathan Booysen 26'; Con: Courtney Winnaar 4', 9', 12', 20' (4/6); Pen: Courtney Winnaar 60' (1/1)	Referee: Ricus van der Hoven

26 August 2016	Eastern Province U19	23–19	Leopards U19	Nelson Mandela Bay Stadium, Port Elizabeth
13:00	Try: Yaw Penxe 8'; Jonathan Booysen 12'; Con: Victor Foster 9', 13' (2/2); Pen: Victor Foster 5', 28', 40' (3/4); Cards: Lutho Selem (yellow card) 69'	Scoreboard	Try: Edmund Rheeder 24'; Reuben du Plooy 38'; Andries Engelbrecht 57'; Con: Tiaan Schoonraad 25', 39' (2/3); Cards: Franco Tiedt (yellow card) 42' to 53'	Referee: Vusi Msibi

2 September 2016	Blue Bulls U19	40–21	Eastern Province U19	Loftus Versfeld, Pretoria
15:00	Try: Eduan Lubbe 5', 70'; Stedman Gans 8'; Manie Libbok 21', 53'; Ciaran Dayaram 47'; Con: Josh Allderman (0/1); Manie Libbok 9', 22', 48', 54', 71' (5/5)	Scoreboard	Try: Yaw Penxe 24'; Courtney Winnaar 68'; Con: Victor Foster 25' (1/2); Pen: Victor Foster 2' (1/1); Courtney Winnaar 16', 34' (2/3)	Referee: Jaco Pretorius

9 September 2016	Eastern Province U19	15–64	Western Province U19	Hoërskool Framesby, Port Elizabeth
13:00	Try: Victor Foster 23'; Jonathan Booysen 56'; Con: Victor Foster (0/1); Yomi Keswa 57' (1/1); Pen: Victor Foster 10' (1/4); Cards: Janse Roux (yellow card) 37' to 47'	Scoreboard	Try: Cornel Smit 6'; Shane Farmer 26'; Jondré Williams 38'; Cobus Wiese 42', 52', 63'; David Brits 46'; Juarno Augustus 61'; Nico Leonard 70'; Con: Jondré Williams 7', 39', 43', 47', 53' (5/6); Adriaan van der Bank 62', 64', 71' (3/3); Pen: Jondré Williams 17' (1/1)	Referee: Lourens van der Merwe

15 September 2016	Free State U19	48–22	Eastern Province U19	Free State Stadium, Bloemfontein
14:30	Try: Warren Brits 17'; Kurt Eybers 22', 38'; George Rossouw 29'; Rewan Kruger 46'; Bertie de Bod 62'; Dawid Snyman 69'; Con: Justin Taylor 23', 30', 39', 47', 70' (5/7); Pen: Justin Taylor 11' (1/1)	Scoreboard	Try: Oyisa Hackula 13'; Yaw Penxe 50', 54'; Con: Victor Foster 14', 55' (2/3); Pen: Victor Foster 3' (1/1)	Attendance: 200; Referee: Jaco Kotze

24 September 2016	Eastern Province U19	5–59	Golden Lions U19	Nelson Mandela Bay Stadium, Port Elizabeth
12:30	Try: Jonathan Booysen 3'; Con: Victor Foster (0/1)	Scoreboard	Try: Madosh Tambwe 8', 12', 48', 61'; Hacjivah Dayimani 18', 22'; Reinhard Nothnagel 30'; Jan-Louis la Grange 54'; Morné van den Berg 67'; Con: Jeanluc Cilliers 13', 19', 23', 31', 49', 62', 68' (7/9)	Referee: Ruhan Meiring

=== Player Appearances ===
The player appearance record in the 2016 Under-19 Provincial Championship is as follows:

Eastern Province U19
Name	SHA	LEO	BUL	WPR	FSC	LIO	SHA	LEO	BUL	WPR	FSC	LIO			App	Try	Kck	Pts
Lupumlo Mguca	1				17 (substituted on)	3							—N/a	—N/a	3	0	0	0
Grant Venter	2	2	2	2	2			17 (substituted on)	17 (substituted on)	17	17 (substituted on)	17 (substituted on)	—N/a	—N/a	9	0	0	0
Daniel Voigt	3	3	3	3	3		18 (substituted on)	18 (substituted on)	18 (substituted on)	18	18	18 (substituted on)	—N/a	—N/a	9	1	0	5
Kamva Dilima	4		5	5	19 (substituted on)	5	19 (substituted on)		5	7	7	5	—N/a	—N/a	10	0	0	0
Thapelo Molapo	5	5	18		7	6	5			19 (substituted on)	6		—N/a	—N/a	7	0	0	0
Duan du Plessis	6	7	6	6	6	2	7	6	6	2	2	2	—N/a	—N/a	12	1	0	5
Lutho Selem	7	6	19 (substituted on)	20 (substituted on)	20 (substituted on)	8	6	20 (substituted on)	20 (substituted on)	16 (substituted on)	19	20 (substituted on)	—N/a	—N/a	11	0	0	0
Mylo Sadiki	8	8	8	8	8	20 (substituted on)	8	8	8				—N/a	—N/a	9	2	0	10
Yomi Keswa	9	9	9	9	9	9	9	9	9	21 (substituted on)	9	9	—N/a	—N/a	12	3	2	17
Morgan Steyn	10	10	12	12		12		10	10	10			—N/a	—N/a	8	0	0	0
Yaw Penxe	11	11	11	11	11	11	11	11	11	11	11		—N/a	—N/a	11	8	0	40
Malan Marais	12	12			22	22 (substituted on)	22	12	12	22	22 (substituted on)	12	—N/a	—N/a	7	0	0	0
Jonathan Booysen	13	13	13	13	13	13	13	13	13	13	13	11	—N/a	—N/a	12	7	0	35
Victor Foster	14	14	14	14	14			14	14	14	15	10	—N/a	—N/a	10	6	79	109
Courtney Winnaar	15	15	10	10		10	10	15	15	15	10	15	—N/a	—N/a	11	5	17	42
Apiwe Febana	16 (substituted on)	16 (substituted on)											—N/a	—N/a	2	0	0	0
CJ van Niekerk	17 (substituted on)	1	1	1	1	1	1	1	1	1	1	1	—N/a	—N/a	12	1	0	5
Dylan Barendse	18	18 (substituted on)	17	18 (substituted on)	18	18 (substituted on)	3	3	3	3	3	3	—N/a	—N/a	9	0	0	0
Janse Roux	19 (substituted on)	4	4	4	4	4		4	4	4	4		—N/a	—N/a	10	0	0	0
Siyanda Am	20 (substituted on)	20 (substituted on)	20 (substituted on)										—N/a	—N/a	3	0	0	0
Wayne Moss	21 (substituted on)	21 (substituted on)	21 (substituted on)										—N/a	—N/a	3	0	0	0
Cliven Loubser	22 (substituted on)			23 (substituted on)	10	15							—N/a	—N/a	4	0	15	15
Michael Botha	23	23 (substituted on)	15	15	15	14	15						—N/a	—N/a	6	2	0	10
Leon Lyons		17 (substituted on)											—N/a	—N/a	1	0	0	0
Michael de Marco		19 (substituted on)	7	7	5	7		7	7	8	8	7	—N/a	—N/a	10	0	0	0
Josiah Twum-Boafo		22 (substituted on)	22									22 (substituted on)	—N/a	—N/a	2	0	0	0
Sive Mazosiwe			16	17 (substituted on)		17 (substituted on)							—N/a	—N/a	2	0	0	0
Thaki Boloko			23	22 (substituted on)	23	23 (substituted on)	14						—N/a	—N/a	3	1	0	5
André Lategan				16 (substituted on)	16 (substituted on)	16 (substituted on)	2	2	2		16 (substituted on)	16 (substituted on)	—N/a	—N/a	8	0	0	0
Shane Weweje				19 (substituted on)		19 (substituted on)	4						—N/a	—N/a	3	0	0	0
Jac van der Walt				21 (substituted on)									—N/a	—N/a	1	0	0	0
Oyisa Hackula					12		12			12	12	13	—N/a	—N/a	5	1	0	5
Reinhardt Engelbrecht					21	21 (substituted on)	21 (substituted on)		22 (substituted on)		21 (substituted on)		—N/a	—N/a	4	1	0	5
Temba Boltina							16	16	16 (substituted on)			19	—N/a	—N/a	1	0	0	0
Matthew King							17 (substituted on)						—N/a	—N/a	1	0	0	0
Lourens Oosthuizen							20 (substituted on)						—N/a	—N/a	1	0	0	0
Siba Mzanywa							23 (substituted on)	23 (substituted on)					—N/a	—N/a	2	0	0	0
Ruben le Roux								5		6			—N/a	—N/a	2	0	0	0
Liam Blake-Taylor								19	21 (substituted on)	20 (substituted on)	20	6	—N/a	—N/a	3	0	0	0
Louis Strydom								21 (substituted on)		9		21 (substituted on)	—N/a	—N/a	3	0	0	0
Riaan van Rensburg								22 (substituted on)	23 (substituted on)	23	14	23 (substituted on)	—N/a	—N/a	4	0	0	0
Donavan Stevens									19 (substituted on)	5	5	4	—N/a	—N/a	4	0	0	0
Nico Grobler											23 (substituted on)	8	—N/a	—N/a	2	0	0	0
Leslie Sharp												14	—N/a	—N/a	1	0	0	0
Total															12	39	113	308
Sihle Njezula and Connor Thalrose were named in the Under-19 Provincial Championship squad, but not included in a matchday squad.

== Varsity Rugby ==
The Eastern Province Kings Rugby Academy is based at the Nelson Mandela Metropolitan University in Port Elizabeth and most of the academy players played Varsity Rugby; either for the NMMU Madibaz in the Varsity Cup or for the NMMU Young Guns in the Under-20 competition.

The following players were included in the Varsity Cup squad:

2016 NMMU Madibaz squad
Forwards	Tango Balekile • Ronnie Beyl • Brandon Brown • Wynand Grassmann • Jedwyn Harty • Gerrit Huisamen • JP Jamieson • Kevin Kaba • Marzuq Maarman • SF Nieuwoudt • Andisa Ntsila • NJ Oosthuizen • Tyler Paul • Junior Pokomela • Jayson Reinecke • Nemo Roelofse • Hayden Tharratt • Elandré van der Merwe • Warrick Venter • Did not play: • Lusanda Badiyana • Greg Jackson • JP Jonck • Sintu Manjezi • Roché van Zyl • CJ Velleman • Xandré Vos
Backs	Simon Bolze • Luvo Claassen • Ivan-John du Preez • Riaan Esterhuizen • Andile Jho • Tom Kean • Ivan Ludick • Khaya Malotana • Yamkela Ngam • Sibusiso Ngcokovane • Luan Nieuwoudt • Warren Swarts • Keanu Vers • Jeremy Ward • Lindelwe Zungu • Did not play: • Davron Cameron • Malcolm Jaer • Somila Jho • Garrick Mattheus • Athi Mayinje • Charles Radebe • Franswa Ueckermann • Courtney Winnaar
Coach	David Maidza

== Youth weeks ==
The Eastern Province Rugby Union announced their squads for the 2016 Under-18 Craven Week, the 2016 Under-18 Academy Week and the 2016 Under-16 Grant Khomo Week tournaments on 24 May 2016:

=== Under-18 Craven Week ===
The 2016 Under-18 Craven Week competition was held between 11 and 16 July 2016 in Durban. Eastern Province Rugby Union entered two sides – Eastern Province U18 and Eastern Province Country Districts U18.

Eastern Province U18 – Craven Week
Forwards	Zane Barnard • William Duckit • Gregan Glover • Tertius Groenewald • Etienne Janeke • Ruan Jonker • Ruben le Roux • Khwezi Mafu • Roelof Roodt • Donavan Stevens • Le-Kleu Stokes • Stefan van der Poel • Viaan Wolmarans
Backs	Lubabalo Dobela • Zukhanye Mafunda • Ayabonga Matroos • Sihle Njezula • Aya Oliphant • Waqar Solaan • Louis Strydom • Keagan Tait • Sicelo Tole • Riaan van Rensburg
Coach	Derik Olivier

Match 1	11 July 2016	Sharks U18	36–24	Eastern Province U18	Kearsney College, Durban
	15:15	Try: Tonderai Ndudzo 1'; Mayibongwe Maduna 14'; Dylan Richardson 34'; Luke Crowshaw 61'; Maartin Holtzhausen 65'; Con: Maartin Holtzhausen (0/4); Cameron Ritchie 66' (1/1); Pen: Maartin Holtzhausen 6', 47', 57' (3/3); Cards: Mayibongwe Maduna (yellow card) 17' to 27'	Report; Scoreboard	Try: Sicelo Tole 45'; Keagan Tait 50'; Aya Oliphant 69'; Con: Riaan van Rensburg 46', 51', 70' (3/3); Pen: Riaan van Rensburg 24' (1/3)	Referee: Egon Seconds

Match 2	13 July 2016	Boland U18	33–37	Eastern Province U18	Kearsney College, Durban
	12:25	Try: Caleb Dingaan 4'; Wayne Wilschut 41'; Michael Goodall 59', 70'; James Mao-Cheia 67'; Con: Anton Du Toit 5', 60', 68', 71' (4/5)	Report; Scoreboard	Try: Ayabonga Matroos 11'; Sicelo Tole 16', 21'; Le-Kleu Stokes 34'; Lubabalo Dobela 56'; Con: Riaan van Rensburg 17', 22', 57' (3/5); Pen: Riaan van Rensburg 7', 25' (2/2)	Referee: Vusi Msibi

Match 3	16 July 2016	Eastern Province U18	12–64	SWD U18	Kearsney College, Durban
	10:25	Try: Riaan van Rensburg 7'; Viaan Wolmarans 27'; Con: Riaan van Rensburg 28' (1/2)	Report; Scoreboard	Try: Lance Lamprecht 13'; Nicolus van Eeden 21', 61'; Bradley Kiewitz 23'; Dian Bleuler 35'; Zinedene Booysen 38'; Sean Swart 42'; Damian Bonaparte 50'; Wilhelm van Heerden 58'; Adriaan-Lee du Preez 65'; Con: Darren Adonis 14', 22', 40', 43', 51' (5/7); Darryle Kameel 62', 66' (2/3)	Referee: Vusi Msibi

Eastern Province Country Districts U18 – Craven Week
Forwards	Hentus Botha • Francu Dreyer • JJ Human • Ollie Losaba • Johan Maartens • Thembinkosi Mangwana • Stephanus Mentz • Keanen Murray • Dihan Odendaal • Lourens Oosthuizen • Ewan Pieters • Sazi Sandi • Bongi Ziya
Backs	Tim Bloem • Chulu Chutu • Izak Conradie • Jonathan Crankshaw • Athenkosi Halom • Vaughen Isaacs • Reynier Meyer • Matt Moore • Sibabalwe Mzanywa • Lutho Nomoyi
Coach	Damian Arends

Match 1	12 July 2016	Eastern Province Country Districts U18	24–26	Leopards U18	Kearsney College, Durban
	11:00	Try: Sazi Sandi 17'; Keanen Murray 30'; Matt Moore 51'; Athenkosi Halom 65'; Con: Vaughen Isaacs 18' (1/3); Izak Conradie 66' (1/1); Pen: Vaughen Isaacs (0/2); Cards: Johan Maartens (yellow card) 39' to 49'	Report; Scoreboard	Try: Gerhard Fourie 9'; Nathan Jordan 23'; Zimosa Nokama 54'; Con: Gerhard Fourie 24' (1/3); Pen: Gerhard Fourie 29', 33', 58' (3/3); Cards: Rudolf Hatting (yellow card) 61'	Referee: Jaco Pretorius

Match 2	14 July 2016	Eastern Province Country Districts U18	62–5	Border Country Districts U18	Kearsney College, Durban
	9:35	Try: Jonathan Crankshaw 16', 25'; Lutho Nomoyi 31'; Chulu Chutu 35', 50'; Lourens Oosthuizen 36'; Ewan Pieters 58'; Athenkosi Halom 61'; Sibabalwe Mzanywa 70'; Con: Vaughen Isaacs 17', 32', 35', 51', 59', 62' (6/8); Jonathan Crankshaw 71' (1/1); Pen: Vaughen Isaacs 49' (1/1); Cards: Bongi Ziya (yellow card) 62'	Report; Scoreboard	Try: Bonisile Mapongwane 66'; Con: Litha Nkula (0/1); Pen: Litha Nkula (0/2); Tabiso Stenge (0/1); Cards: Siphosoxolo Dlongodlongo (yellow card) 29' to 39'; Litha Nkula (yellow card) 49' to 59'	Referee: Sindile Ngcese

Match 3	16 July 2016	Limpopo Blue Bulls U18	35–5	Eastern Province Country Districts U18	Kearsney College, Durban
	10:50	Try: Danny Mokhoabane 2', 7'; Stefan Engelbrecht 12'; Jan Coertze 38', 55'; Con: Wernich Kachelhoffer 3', 8', 13', 39', 56' (5/5)	Report; Scoreboard	Try: Sazi Sandi 49'; Con: Vaughen Isaacs (0/1)	Referee: Mpho Matsaung

=== Under-18 Academy Week ===
The 2016 Under-18 Academy Week competition was held between 11 and 16 July 2016 in Durban. Eastern Province Rugby Union entered two sides – Eastern Province U18 and Eastern Province Country Districts U18.

Eastern Province U18 – Academy Week
Forwards	Ruan Botha • Janu Fourie • Desmick Kleinbooi • Shane Kluyts • Oyama Mgesisi • Dillon Minnaar • Landile Mlonzi • Henco Nel • Armand Pretorius • Gert Rautenbach • Carl Senyane • Elandré Smit • Leonardo Tshingane
Backs	Rodwill Baaitjies • Curtley Deysel • Jayren Draghoender • Ethan Jantjies • Bendré Jonck • Julian Kleyn • Dylan le Roux • Romario McCarthy • Henco Pieterse • Lindsay Potgieter
Coach	Elroy Swartz

Match 1	12 July 2016	Blue Bulls U18	57–15	Eastern Province U18	Kearsney College, Durban
	13:55	Try: Christian Strydom 5', 15'; Hendré Eloff 26'; Bjorkan Hendricks 31'; Jack Hart 35', 68'; Sean Thungo 37'; Ruan Nortjé 52'; Themba Mandlati 62'; Con: Duhann Gunter 16', 32', 35', 38', 53', 63' (6/9); Cards: Jaco Labuschagné (yellow card) 20' to 30'	Report; Scoreboard	Try: Julian Kleyn 20'; Curtley Deysel 46'; Lindsay Potgieter 60'; Con: Bendré Jonck (0/2); Dylan le Roux (0/1); Pen: Dylan le Roux (0/1); Bendré Jonck (0/1); Cards: Elandré Smit (yellow card) 20' to 30'

Match 2	14 July 2016	Eastern Province U18	21–21	Red Valke U18	Kearsney College, Durban
	13:55	Try: Leonardo Tshingane 22'; Dylan le Roux 55'; Con: Rodwill Baatjies 23' (1/2); Pen: Rodwill Baatjies 8', 37', 51' (3/3)	Report; Scoreboard	Try: Henry Pike 32'; Ephraim Nkomo 41'; Johan Botes 66'; Con: Henry Pike 33', 42', 67' (3/3); Pen: Henry Pike (0/1)

Match 3	16 July 2016	Namibia	15–17	Eastern Province U18	Glenwood High School, Durban
	12:50	Try: Amos Loxton 39'; Warren Ludwig 47'; Con: Delron Brandt 40' (1/2); Pen: Delron Brandt (0/2); Isaiah Muhinda 50' (1/1)	Report; Scoreboard	Try: Henco Pieterse 11'; Lindsay Potgieter 53'; Con: Rodwill Baatjies 12', 54' (2/2); Pen: Dylan le Roux 9' (1/1)

Eastern Province Country Districts U18 – Academy Week
Forwards	Mihle Bobelo • Jandré Els • Rechardt Engelbrecht • Rivaldo Marima • Lwandile Ndzilendzila • Ikhetheleng Nkhereanye • Luvo Piliso • Henry Schoeman • Pieter Swanepoel • Johannes Swart • Gerhardus Terblanche • Zean van der Walt • Cornelius Vorster
Backs	Nevaldo Fleurs • Kyle Greyvenstein • Aden-Luke Masoling • Azizipho Mngcongo • Esona Mrwetyana • Ruan Pretorius • Enrico Saptoe • Kindness Sibanda • Keenan Stride • Andries van Wyk
Coach	Owen Stride

Match 1	11 July 2016	Griffons Country Districts U18	19–15	Eastern Province Country Districts U18	Kearsney College, Durban
	9:20	Try: Juan-Carlo Kleynhans 2'; Albertus Pretorius 43'; Komane Seeta 46'; Con: Juan-Carlo Kleynhans 44', 47' (2/3); Pen: Juan-Carlo Kleynhans (0/2); Cards: Marthinus Klopper (yellow card) 61'	Report; Scoreboard	Try: Andries van Wyk 39'; Cornelius Vorster 61'; Con: Kyle Greyvenstein 40' (1/2); Pen: Kyle Greyvenstein 30' (1/2)

Match 2	13 July 2016	Eastern Province Country Districts U18	15–30	SWD U18	Kearsney College, Durban
	8:35	Try: Esona Mrwetyana 26'; Enrico Saptoe 54'; Con: Nevaldo Fleurs (0/1); Enrico Saptoe 55' (1/1); Pen: Kyle Greyvenstein (0/1); Nevaldo Fleurs 35' (1/2)	Report; Scoreboard	Try: Ruan Lamprecht 37', 57'; JC Lourens 43'; Tiaan Fourie 65'; Peter Machal 70'; Con: Darryn Fortuin (0/1); Cuan Belelie 66' (1/3); Pen: Cuan Belelie 41' (1/1); Cards: Tiaan Fourie (yellow card) 21' to 31'

Match 3	16 July 2016	Blue Valke U18	13–18	Eastern Province Country Districts U18	Glenwood High School, Durban
	11:40	Try: Tertius van Rensburg 53'; Andries de Jager 68'; Con: Dylan Schoeman (0/2); Pen: Dylan Schoeman 14' (1/1)	Report; Scoreboard	Try: Nevaldo Fleurs 58'; Esona Mrwetyana 63'; Con: Kyle Greyvenstein 63' (1/2); Pen: Nevaldo Fleurs 42' (1/1); Kyle Greyvenstein 51' (1/1)

=== Under-16 Grant Khomo Week ===
The 2016 Under-16 Grant Khomo Week competition was held between 4 and 8 July 2016 in Paarl.

Eastern Province U16 – Grant Khomo Week
Forwards	Ryan Adams • Shaq Adams • Hendrik du Toit • Laken Gray • Luther Greeff • Hlumelo Gumatana • Kelvin Kanenungo • Rohan Kruger • Elmar Lotz • Daniel Naudé • Corné Slabbert • Roché van As • Ryan Windvogel
Backs	Enrique Franks • Adrian Gouza • Claude Jacobs • Jayren Marlow • Naldo Pedro • Johann Smalberger • Luke Smuts • Emile Stevens • Heinrich van Rooyen • Andreleigh van Wyk
Coach	Christiaan van Schalkwyk

Match 1	4 July 2016	Eastern Province U16	10–13	Griquas U16	Paarl Gimnasium, Paarl
	12:45	Try: Heinrich van Rooyen 55'; Con: Claude Jacobs 56' (1/1); Pen: Claude Jacobs 18' (1/1); Cards: Luther Greeff (red card) 21'	Report; Scoreboard	Try: Siseka Mvenya 23'; Con: Salmon Oberholzer 24' (1/1); Pen: Handre Bruwer 13' (1/1); Salmon Oberholzer 58' (1/1)

Match 2	6 July 2016	Eastern Province U16	16–6	Griffons U16	Paarl Gimnasium, Paarl
	9:30	Try: Luke Smuts 5'; Con: Claude Jacobs 6' (1/1); Pen: Claude Jacobs 16', 21', 27' (3/3)	Report; Scoreboard	Pen: Ruben Liebenberg 23', 41' (2/3)

Match 3	8 July 2016	Western Province U16	45–8	Eastern Province U16	Paarl Gimnasium, Paarl
	9:30	Try: Adrian Alberts 9'; Justin Reynolds 15'; Thoubaan Gabriels 39'; Roubert Bester 49', 58'; Noegh Hayward 60'; Con: Nivan Petersen 10', 16', 40', 50', 59', 60' (6/6); Pen: Nivan Petersen 33' (1/1)	Report; Scoreboard	Try: Kelvin Kanenungo 29'; Con: Claude Jacobs (0/1); Pen: Claude Jacobs 12' (1/1); Cards: Kelvin Kanenungo (yellow card) 39'

=== Under-13 Craven Week Week ===
The 2016 Under-13 Craven Week competition was held between 4 and 8 July 2016 in Paarl.

Eastern Province U13 – Craven Week
Forwards	Cleavan Adams • Ruben Barnard • Jan-Hendrik Gouws • Ockert Greeff • Liyabonga Nathan Matabielie • Rayquin Michaels • Lwethu Ngcongco • Damien Rudman • Kyle van Jaarsveld • Roland van Wyk • Dylan Willis • Marnus Winter • Lazola Zatu
Backs	Luyolo Dambuza • Sive Jack • Hlombe Langa • Diego Lottering • Odwa Mdazana • Liyemi Moni • Divan Moss • Jared Rees • George van Heerden • Tiaan van Wyk

Match 1	4 July 2016	Valke U13	19–7	Eastern Province U13	Paarl Gimnasium, Paarl
	9:30	Try: Ruan Slabbert 3'; Diego Cupido 22'; Njaqbulo Khulu 45'; Con: Reynier Overweg 4', 23' (2/3)	Report; Scoreboard	Try: Liyabona Nathan Matabielie 30'; Con: Divan Moss 31' (1/1)

Match 2	5 July 2016	Eastern Province U13	27–12	Pumas U13	Paarl Gimnasium, Paarl
	11:00	Try: Cleavan Adams 8', 50'; Hlombe Langa 21'; Jared Rees 25'; Divan Moss 39'; Con: Divan Moss (0/2); Jared Rees 50' (1/3)	Report; Scoreboard	Try: Thabiso Matheba 18'; Pieter Willem Voges 41'; Con: Christo Nel 19' (1/2)

Match 3	7 July 2016	Griffons U13	49–17	Eastern Province U13	Paarl Gimnasium, Paarl
	11:00	Try: Lerato Manyana 2', 25', 31'; Wian Muller 14'; David Liebenberg 21', 43', 49'; Dendré Aucamp 23'; Charlton Mettler 47'; Con: David Liebenberg (0/3); Ivan Putter (0/2); Dendré Aucamp (0/1); Jandré van der Merwe 48', 50' (2/3); Cards: David Liebenberg (yellow card) 7' to 12'	Report; Scoreboard	Try: Roland van Wyk 20'; Luyolo Dambuza 28'; Cleavan Adams 39'; Con: Jared Rees 21' (1/3)

Match 4	8 July 2016	Eastern Province U13	48–0	Border Country Districts U13	Paarl Gimnasium, Paarl
	08:30	Try: Liyabona Nathan Matabielie 1', 30', 39'; Diego Lottering 8', 15', 51'; Jared Rees 22', 48'; Con: Jared Rees 2', 23' (2/6); George van Heerden 49' (1/1); Divan Moss 52' (1/1)	Report; Scoreboard

== See also ==
- Eastern Province Elephants
- Southern Kings
- 2016 Currie Cup Premier Division
- 2016 Under-21 Provincial Championship
- 2016 Under-19 Provincial Championship
