= 2017 Eastern Province Kings season =

Team Information
- Stadiums: Nelson Mandela Bay Stadium, WJ de Wet Stadium and Wolfson Stadium
- President: André Rademan

Currie Cup First Division
- Coach: Ryan Felix
- Captains: Cody Basson, Andile Jho and Jarryd Sage
- Rank: 8th
- Record: Lost 7
- Top points scorer: Sphu Msutwana (25)
- Top try scorer: Sphu Msutwana (5)

Rugby Challenge
- Coach: Robbi Kempson
- Captains: Lusanda Badiyana, Giant Mtyanda, Stefan Ungerer and Mike Willemse
- Rank: 2nd (Southern Section); Quarterfinalist
- Record: Won 5, Lost 3
- Top points scorer: Pieter-Steyn de Wet (34)
- Top try scorer: Keanu Vers (6)

Other seasons
- Previous season: ← 2016
- Next season: 2018 →

In 2017, the Eastern Province Kings participated in the Currie Cup First Division and the Rugby Challenge competitions. The Eastern Province U21 team played in the Under-21 Provincial Championship and the Eastern Province U19 team in the Under-19 Provincial Championship.

== Currie Cup ==
=== Squad ===
The Eastern Province Kings squad for the Currie Cup was:

2017 Eastern Province Kings Currie Cup squad
Player	Position/s	Date of birth (age)			
Player	Position/s	Date of birth (age)	Zingisa April	Flanker	19 June 1990 (aged 27)
Riaan Arends	Wing	31 January 1989 (aged 28)			
Tango Balekile	Hooker	7 March 1996 (aged 21)			
Dewald Barnard	Prop	17 February 1989 (aged 28)			
Eben Barnard	Wing	29 January 1992 (aged 25)			
Cody Basson	Number eight	2 July 1991 (aged 26)			
Alshaun Bock	Wing	16 May 1982 (aged 35)			
Simon Bolze	Fly-half	30 July 1995 (aged 22)			
Michael Brink	Fly-half	24 September 1996 (aged 20)			
Brandon Brown	Flanker	16 November 1994 (aged 22)			
Bathandwa Cafu	Hooker	28 June 1995 (aged 22)			
Luvo Claassen	Scrum-half / Fly-half	1 February 1995 (aged 22)			
Ntabeni Dukisa	Fly-half	25 July 1988 (aged 29)			
Ivan-John du Preez	Wing	23 June 1994 (aged 23)			
Reyno du Toit	Lock	21 April 1995 (aged 22)			
Renier Erasmus	Flanker	7 December 1991 (aged 25)			
Riaan Esterhuizen	Centre	8 August 1994 (aged 23)			
Quewin Gawie	Fullback	N/A			
Rowan Gouws	Scrum-half	6 August 1995 (aged 22)			
Wynand Grassmann	Lock	19 January 1995 (aged 22)			
Stephan Greeff	Lock	24 December 1989 (aged 27)			
Siyanda Grey	Centre	16 August 1989 (aged 28)			
Jedwyn Harty	Hooker	19 November 1995 (aged 21)			
Thabang Holejane	Fullback	N/A			
Justin Hollis	Flanker	17 October 1995 (aged 21)			
Gerrit Huisamen	Lock	7 March 1995 (aged 22)			
JP Jamieson	Hooker	15 February 1995 (aged 22)			
Andile Jho	Centre	21 April 1992 (aged 25)			
Harlon Klaasen	Centre / Fullback	13 August 1993 (aged 24)			
Josh Kota	Hooker	23 September 1987 (aged 29)			
Rivan Lemmer	Fly-half	2 April 1996 (aged 21)			
Bart le Roux	Prop	28 January 1994 (aged 23)			
Anele Lungisa	Lock	N/A			
Sonwabo Majola	Scrum-half	20 March 1993 (aged 24)			
Michael Makase	Wing	20 January 1990 (aged 27)			
Dumisani Meslane	Flanker	11 May 1985 (aged 32)			
Matthew Moore	Prop	3 October 1994 (aged 22)			
Sphu Msutwana	Wing	31 October 1993 (aged 23)			
Yamkela Ngam	Fullback	6 September 1991 (aged 25)			
Freddy Ngoza	Number eight	20 October 1991 (aged 25)			
SF Nieuwoudt	Flanker	27 August 1996 (aged 20)			
Luzuko Nyabaza	Prop	31 October 1990 (aged 26)			
Nick Roebeck	Prop	11 August 1993 (aged 24)			
Jarryd Sage	Centre	18 August 1995 (aged 22)			
Masixole Screech	Lock	1 December 1986 (aged 30)			
Victor Sekekete	Flanker	28 January 1994 (aged 23)			
Curtis Sias	Fly-half	26 September 1989 (aged 27)			
Ruan Stander	Fly-half	5 September 1990 (aged 26)			
Keanu Vers	Fullback	4 February 1996 (aged 21)			
Xandré Vos	Prop	30 September 1996 (aged 20)			
Lindokuhle Welemu	Lock	29 April 1991 (aged 26)			
Diego Williams	Flanker / Lock	N/A			
Thembelihle Yase	Prop	25 April 1995 (aged 22)			
Lindelwe Zungu	Fullback	16 May 1995 (aged 22)			
Note: Players' ages and statistics are correct as of 26 August 2017, the date of the opening round of the competition.

=== Standings ===
The final log for the 2017 Currie Cup First Division was:

2017 Currie Cup First Division log
Pos	Team	Pld	W	D	L	PF	PA	PD	TF	TA	TB	LB	Pts	Qualification
1	Griffons	7	6	0	1	329	227	+102	49	35	7	0	31	Semi-finals
2	Falcons	7	5	0	2	240	202	+38	33	30	5	1	26	Semi-finals
3	Leopards	7	4	1	2	301	221	+80	43	30	5	1	24	Semi-finals
4	Boland Cavaliers	7	4	0	3	238	196	+42	36	28	7	1	24	Semi-finals
5	SWD Eagles	7	4	1	2	240	230	+10	33	32	4	0	22	
6	Border Bulldogs	7	3	0	4	203	249	−46	28	36	5	2	19	
7	Welwitschias	7	1	0	6	267	313	−46	39	47	6	4	14	
8	Eastern Province Kings	7	0	0	7	174	354	−180	28	51	5	0	5	

Rules for classification: 4 points for a win; 2 points for a draw; 1 bonus point for a loss by seven points or less; 1 bonus point for scoring four or more tries in a match

=== Round-by-round ===
Team Progression – 2017 Currie Cup First Division
Team	R1	R2	R3	R4	R5	R6	R7
Opposition	BOL	WEL	LEO	BDR	GRF	GFA	SWD
Cumulative Points	1	2	2	3	4	4	5
Position	8th	8th	8th	8th	8th	8th	8th
Key:	win	draw	loss				

=== Matches ===
26 August 2017	Eastern Province Kings	27–40	Boland Cavaliers	Wolfson Stadium, KwaZakele
15:00	Try: Cody Basson; Siyanda Grey; Andile Jho; Sonwabo Majola; Con: Simon Bolze; Pen: Simon Bolze	Scoreboard	Try: Charlie Mayeza; Gerrit van Wyk; Chadley Wenn; Ludio Williams; Con: Divan Nel	Referee: Sindile Ngcese

2 September 2017	Welwitschias	51–25	Eastern Province Kings	Hage Geingob Stadium, Windhoek
16:00	Try: Thomasau Forbes; Rohan Kitshoff; Lesley Klim; Johann Tromp; Christo van der Merwe; Con: Theuns Kotzé; Pen: Theuns Kotzé	Scoreboard	Try: Zingisa April; Riaan Arends; Ivan-John du Preez; Anele Lungisa; Con: Sonwabo Majola; Pen: Sonwabo Majola	Referee: Stephan Geldenhuys

8 September 2017	Leopards	57–20	Eastern Province Kings	Olën Park, Potchefstroom
16:00	Try: Francois Jacobs; Jeandré Rudolph; Elden Schoeman; Joe Smith; Dane van der Westhuyzen; Con: Schalk Hugo; Gerhard Nortier; Pen: Gerhard Nortier	Scoreboard	Try: Cody Basson; Siyanda Grey; Con: Michael Brink; Luvo Claassen; Pen: Michael Brink	Referee: Federico Anselmi

15 September 2017	Eastern Province Kings	24–40	Border Bulldogs	WJ de Wet Stadium, Despatch
15:00	Try: Wynand Grassmann; Siyanda Grey; Sphu Msutwana; Con: Rivan Lemmer; Sonwabo Majola	Scoreboard	Try: Phumlani Blaauw; Billy Dutton; Lelethu Gcilitshana; Athenkosi Manentsa; Mbembe Payi; Sethu Tom; Con: Nkululeko Ndlovu; Mbembe Payi	Referee: JP Clements

23 September 2017	Griffons	71–39	Eastern Province Kings	North West Stadium, Welkom
15:00	Try: Shirwin Cupido; Selvyn Davids; Jaun Kotzé; Tertius Maarman; Vuyo Mbotho; Khwezi Mkhafu; Malcolm-Kerr Till; Danie van der Merwe; Arthur Williams; Con: Jaun Kotzé; Pen: Jaun Kotzé	Scoreboard	Try: Zingisa April; Alshaun Bock; Harlon Klaasen; Anele Lungisa; Sphu Msutwana; Con: Ntabeni Dukisa	Referee: Vusi Msibi

30 September 2017	Eastern Province Kings	17–29	Falcons	WJ de Wet Stadium, Despatch
15:00	Try: Josh Kota; Sphu Msutwana; Con: Luvo Claassen	Scoreboard	Try: Coert Cronjé; Shane Kirkwood; Ernst Ladendorf; Don Mlondobozi; Christian Rust; Con: Warren Potgieter	Referee: Archie Sehlako

6 October 2017	SWD Eagles	66–22	Eastern Province Kings	Outeniqua Park, George
18:00	Try: Martin du Toit; Kurt Haupt; Adri Jacobs; Marquit September; Janneman Stander; Jacques Vermaak; Con: Leighton Eksteen	Scoreboard	Try: Harlon Klaasen; Jarryd Sage; Victor Sekekete; Con: Sonwabo Majola	Referee: Vusi Msibi

=== Player statistics ===
The appearance record for players that represented the Eastern Province Kings in the 2017 Currie Cup First Division is as follows:

2017 Eastern Province Kings player statistics
Player name	BOL	WEL	LEO	BDR	GRF	GFA	SWD	App	Try	Kck	Pts
Dewald Barnard	1	1		1	17 (substituted in)	1	1	6	0	0	0
JP Jamieson	2	2	2	2	2			5	0	0	0
Matthew Moore	3							1	0	0	0
Wynand Grassmann	4	4		4	4	18 (substituted in)	5	6	1	0	5
Reyno du Toit	5			18 (substituted in)				2	0	0	0
Renier Erasmus	6	6	6		6	19 (substituted in)	19 (substituted in)	6	0	0	0
Zingisa April	7	7	7	7	7			5	2	0	10
Cody Basson	8	8	8	8	8			5	2	0	10
Sonwabo Majola	9	9	9	20 (substituted in)	20 (substituted in)	9	9	7	1	9	14
Simon Bolze	10							1	0	7	7
Ivan-John du Preez	11	11	11	11		22 (substituted in)		5	1	0	5
Andile Jho	12	12				21 (substituted in)	21 (substituted in)	4	1	0	5
Siyanda Grey	13	13	13	13	21 (substituted in)	13	13	7	3	0	15
Riaan Arends	14	14	14	22				3	1	0	5
Lindelwe Zungu	15	15		15				3	0	0	0
Jedwyn Harty	16 (substituted in)	16 (substituted in)	16 (substituted in)	16 (substituted in)				4	0	0	0
Thembelihle Yase	17 (substituted in)							1	0	0	0
Masixole Screech	18 (substituted in)				18 (substituted in)	4	4	4	0	0	0
Diego Williams	19 (substituted in)	19 (substituted in)	18					2	0	0	0
Luvo Claassen	20	20 (substituted in)	20 (substituted in)	9		10		4	0	4	4
Riaan Esterhuizen	21 (substituted in)	21 (substituted in)	12	12				4	0	0	0
Sphu Msutwana	22 (substituted in)	22 (substituted in)	21 (substituted in)	14	22 (substituted in)	11	11	7	5	0	25
Nick Roebeck		3	3	17 (substituted in)	1	17 (substituted in)	17 (substituted in)	6	0	0	0
Anele Lungisa		5	5	5	5	5	18 (substituted in)	6	3	0	15
Curtis Sias		10						1	0	0	0
Xandré Vos		17 (substituted in)	1					2	0	0	0
Justin Hollis		18 (substituted in)						1	0	0	0
Stephan Greeff			4					1	0	0	0
Michael Brink			10					1	0	8	8
Keanu Vers			15					1	0	0	0
Bart le Roux			17 (substituted in)	3			3	3	0	0	0
Dumisani Meslane			19 (substituted in)	6	19 (substituted in)		20 (substituted in)	4	0	0	0
Thabang Holejane			22	21				0	0	0	0
Rivan Lemmer				10				1	0	2	2
SF Nieuwoudt				19 (substituted in)		6	6	3	0	0	0
Luzuko Nyabaza					3	3		2	0	0	0
Rowan Gouws					9			1	0	0	0
Ntabeni Dukisa					10			1	0	4	4
Alshaun Bock					11			1	1	0	5
Jarryd Sage					12	12	12	3	1	0	5
Harlon Klaasen					13		15	2	4	0	20
Michael Makase					14	14	14	3	0	0	0
Yamkela Ngam					15	15	22 (substituted in)	3	0	0	0
Josh Kota					16 (substituted in)	2	2	3	1	0	5
Victor Sekekete						7	7	2	1	0	5
Freddy Ngoza						8	8	2	0	0	0
Bathandwa Cafu						16 (substituted in)	16 (substituted in)	2	0	0	0
Ruan Stander						20 (substituted in)	10	2	0	0	0
Total								7	28	34	174

(c) denotes the team captain. For each match, the player's squad number is shown. Starting players are numbered 1 to 15, while the replacements are numbered 16 to 22. If a replacement made an appearance in the match, it is indicated by (substituted in) . "App" refers to the number of appearances made by the player, "Try" to the number of tries scored by the player, "Kck" to the number of points scored via kicks (conversions, penalties or drop goals) and "Pts" refer to the total number of points scored by the player.

- Tango Balekile, Eben Barnard, Brandon Brown, Quewin Gawie, Gerrit Huisamen and Lindokuhle Welemu did not make any appearances.

== Rugby Challenge ==
=== Squad ===
The Eastern Province Kings squad for the Rugby Challenge was:

2017 Eastern Province Kings Rugby Challenge squad
Player	Position/s	Date of birth (age)			
Player	Position/s	Date of birth (age)	Zingisa April	Flanker	19 June 1990 (aged 26)
Lusanda Badiyana	Number eight	1 September 1996 (aged 20)			
Tango Balekile	Hooker	7 March 1996 (aged 21)			
Dewald Barnard	Prop	17 February 1989 (aged 28)			
Thembelani Bholi	Flanker	18 January 1990 (aged 27)			
Alshaun Bock	Wing	16 May 1982 (aged 34)			
Simon Bolze	Fly-half / Wing	30 July 1995 (aged 21)			
Chrysander Botha	Fullback	13 July 1988 (aged 28)			
Michael Brink	Centre	24 September 1996 (aged 20)			
Brandon Brown	Loose forward	16 November 1994 (aged 22)			
Wihan Coetzer	Lock	30 August 1996 (aged 20)			
Khona Dabula	Prop	N/A			
Christiaan de Bruin	Lock / Flanker	20 January 1993 (aged 24)			
Pieter-Steyn de Wet	Fly-half	8 January 1991 (aged 26)			
Wynand Grassmann	Lock / Flanker	19 January 1995 (aged 22)			
Siyanda Grey	Centre	16 August 1989 (aged 27)			
Stokkies Hanekom	Centre	17 May 1989 (aged 27)			
Chris Heiberg	Prop	1 June 1985 (aged 31)			
Matt Howes	Prop	4 January 1996 (aged 21)			
Vaughen Isaacs	Fly-half	29 March 1999 (aged 18)			
Greg Jackson	Hooker	7 March 1996 (aged 21)			
Malcolm Jaer	Fullback	29 June 1995 (aged 21)			
JP Jamieson	Hooker	15 February 1995 (aged 22)			
Kevin Kaba	Flanker	29 July 1994 (aged 22)			
Berton Klaasen	Centre	24 January 1990 (aged 27)			
Cameron Lindsay	Lock	15 October 1991 (aged 25)			
Rob Lyons	Lock / Flanker	26 June 1996 (aged 20)			
Sonwabo Majola	Scrum-half / Wing	20 March 1993 (aged 24)			
Sintu Manjezi	Lock	7 April 1995 (aged 22)			
Neil Maritz	Centre / Wing	22 February 1994 (aged 23)			
Garrick Mattheus	Fly-half	23 March 1996 (aged 21)			
Athi Mayinje	Wing	18 January 1996 (aged 21)			
Sive Mazosiwe	Prop	24 March 1997 (aged 20)			
Lupumlo Mguca	Prop	25 April 1997 (aged 19)			
Wandile Mjekevu	Centre	7 January 1991 (aged 26)			
Jixie Molapo	Wing	2 January 1995 (aged 22)			
Thapelo Molapo	Wing	21 May 1997 (aged 19)			
Giant Mtyanda	Lock	19 March 1986 (aged 31)			
Waylon Murray	Centre	27 April 1986 (aged 30)			
Rouche Nel	Scrum-half / Wing	26 March 1996 (aged 21)			
Sibusiso Ngcokovane	Scrum-half	17 February 1996 (aged 21)			
SF Nieuwoudt	Flanker	27 August 1996 (aged 20)			
Tyler Paul	Number eight	20 January 1995 (aged 22)			
Mabhutana Peter	Fullback	4 July 1996 (aged 20)			
Janse Roux	Lock	28 August 1997 (aged 19)			
Ricky Schroeder	Scrum-half	5 January 1991 (aged 26)			
Robin Stevens	Hooker	28 February 1996 (aged 21)			
Hayden Tharratt	Flanker	16 February 1996 (aged 21)			
Johann Tromp	Centre / Fullback	23 December 1990 (aged 26)			
Stefan Ungerer	Scrum-half	23 November 1993 (aged 23)			
Rudi van Rooyen	Scrum-half	5 January 1992 (aged 25)			
Johan van Wyk	Prop	12 January 1995 (aged 22)			
Roché van Zyl	Prop	14 June 1996 (aged 20)			
Keanu Vers	Outside back	4 February 1996 (aged 21)			
Xandré Vos	Prop	30 September 1996 (aged 20)			
Mike Willemse	Hooker	14 February 1993 (aged 24)			
Stefan Willemse	Lock / Flanker	12 April 1992 (aged 25)			
Mzwanele Zito	Lock	23 November 1988 (aged 28)			
Note: Players' ages and statistics are correct as of 23 April 2017, the date of the opening round of the competition.

=== Standings ===
The final log for the 2017 Rugby Challenge was:

2017 Rugby Challenge Southern Section log
Pos	Team	P	W	D	L	PF	PA	PD	TF	TA	TB	LB	Pts
1	Western Province	8	8	0	0	312	171	+141	46	23	7	0	39
2	Eastern Province Kings	8	5	0	3	235	222	+13	34	30	4	1	25
3	Border Bulldogs	8	4	0	4	215	264	−49	29	37	4	2	22
4	Boland Cavaliers	8	3	0	5	193	198	−5	24	28	4	2	18
5	SWD Eagles	8	0	0	8	183	283	−100	25	40	3	6	9
Final standings.

Legend and competition rules
Legend:
Qualify to the quarter-finals.	P = Games played, W = Games won, D = Games drawn, L = Games lost, PF = Points for, PA = Points against, PD = Points difference, TF = Tries for, TA = Tries against, TB = Try bonus points, LB = Losing bonus points, Pts = Log points
Competition rules:
Qualification: The top four teams will qualify to the semi-finals. Points breakdown: * 4 points for a win * 2 points for a draw * 1 bonus point for a loss by seven points or less * 1 bonus point for scoring four or more tries in a match

=== Round-by-round ===
Team Progression – 2017 Rugby Challenge
Team	R1	R2	R3	R4	R5	R6	R7	R8	R9	R10	QF	SF	F
Opposition	WPr	SWD	Bye	BDR	BOL	WPr	SWD	Bye	BDR	BOL	GRQ	N/A	N/A
Cumulative Points	0	5	5	6	11	11	15	15	20	25			
Position	5th	3rd	3rd	4th	3rd	4th	3rd	3rd	3rd	2nd			
Key:	win	draw	loss										

=== Matches ===
23 April 2017	Eastern Province Kings	18–30	Western Province	Wolfson Stadium, KwaZakele
15:00	Try: Siyanda Grey 23'; Stefan Ungerer 40'; Alshaun Bock 52'; Pen: Garrick Mattheus 7'; Cards: Siyanda Grey (yellow card) 49' to 64'; Christiaan de Bruin (yellow card) 73'	Report	Try: Valentino Wellman 8'; Grant Hermanus 55'; Luke Stringer 60'; Jaco Coetzee 80'; Con: Brandon Thomson 9', 60'; Pen: Brandon Thomson 17', 50'; Cards: Luke Stringer (yellow card) 31' to 41'	Referee: Rodney Boneparte

28 April 2017	SWD Eagles	29–34	Eastern Province Kings	Outeniqua Park, George
19:00	Try: Leighton Eksteen penalty try Lodewyk Uys; Johnny Welthagen; Con: Leighton Eksteen; Pen: Leighton Eksteen	Report	Try: Thembelani Bholi; Neil Maritz; Waylon Murray penalty try Keanu Vers; Con: Simon Bolze; Pen: Simon Bolze	Referee: Stuart Berry

13 May 2017	Eastern Province Kings	17–20	Border Bulldogs	Nelson Mandela Bay Stadium, Port Elizabeth
14:30	Try: Greg Jackson 1'; Stefan Ungerer 55'; Brandon Brown 71'; Con: Garrick Mattheus 56'	Report	Try: Ntabeni Dukisa 4'; Michael Makase 6'; Johannes Janse van Rensburg 59'; Con: Oliver Zono 7'; Pen: Oliver Zono 13'; Cards: Lindokuhle Welemu (yellow card) 78'	Referee: AJ Jacobs

20 May 2017	Eastern Province Kings	27–16	Boland Cavaliers	Nelson Mandela Bay Stadium, Port Elizabeth
16:45	Try: Simon Bolze; Sonwabo Majola; Lupumlo Mguca; Con: Simon Bolze; Pen: Simon Bolze	Report	Try: Clemen Lewis; Con: Divan Nel; Pen: Divan Nel	Referee: Egon Seconds

27 May 2017	Western Province	39–24	Eastern Province Kings	City Park Stadium, Athlone
15:00	Try: Craig Barry; Jaco Coetzee; Khanyo Ngcukana; Marcello Sampson; Chad Solomon; Con: Brandon Thomson; Pen: Brandon Thomson	Report	Try: Michael Brink; Siyanda Grey; Wandile Mjekevu; Con: Garrick Mattheus; Pen: Garrick Mattheus	Referee: Ben Crouse

4 June 2017	Eastern Province Kings	24–21	SWD Eagles	Sisa Dukashe Stadium, Mdantsane
13:00	Try: Tango Balekile 4'; Keanu Vers 40', 43'; Chris Heiberg 54'; Con: Pieter-Steyn de Wet 44', 55'; Cards: Rouche Nel (yellow card) 59' to 69'	Report	Try: Johnny Welthagen 19'; Thor Halvorsen 60'; Marlo Weich 70'; Con: Leighton Eksteen 20', 61', 71'; Cards: Davon Raubenheimer (yellow card) 26' to 37'; Marlou van Niekerk (yellow card) 36' to 47'	Referee: Cwengile Jadezweni

15 June 2017	Border Bulldogs	38–43	Eastern Province Kings	Buffalo City Stadium, East London
17:00	Try: Lelethu Gcilitshana 2', 21'; Sonwabiso Mqalo 15'; Michael Makase 16'; Oliver Zono 73'; Con: Oliver Zono 2', 16', 18', 22', 73'; Pen: Oliver Zono 64'; Cards: Lunga Dumezweni (yellow card) 56' to 66'	Report	Try: Stefan Ungerer 6'; Neil Maritz 11'; Tango Balekile 32'; Sonwabo Majola 35'; Stefan Willemse 54'; Brandon Brown 67'; Con: Pieter-Steyn de Wet 7', 12', 33', 36', 69'; Pen: Pieter-Steyn de Wet 59'; Cards: SF Nieuwoudt (yellow card) 14' to 24'	Referee: Cwengile Jadezweni

24 June 2017	Boland Cavaliers	29–48	Eastern Province Kings	Bredasdorp
15:00	Try: Mac Muller; Edwin Sass; Vian van der Watt; Gerrit van Wyk; Con: Divan Nel; Pen: Divan Nel	Report	Try: Tango Balekile; Malcolm Jaer; Neil Maritz; Keanu Vers; Mike Willemse; Con: Pieter-Steyn de Wet	Referee: Quinton Immelman

Quarter-final	1 July 2017	Griquas	73–41	Eastern Province Kings	Tafel Lager Park, Kimberley
	15:00	Try: Ederies Arendse; Enver Brandt; Marius Fourie; Sias Koen; AJ le Roux; Koch Marx; Christiaan Meyer; Eric Zana; Con: George Whitehead	Report	Try: Lusanda Badiyana; Brandon Brown; Sonwabo Majola; Sintu Manjezi; SF Nieuwoudt; Keanu Vers; Con: Pieter-Steyn de Wet; Garrick Mattheus; Pen: Pieter-Steyn de Wet	Referee: AJ Jacobs

=== Player statistics ===
The appearance record for players that represented the Eastern Province Kings in the 2017 Rugby Challenge is as follows:

2017 Eastern Province Kings Rugby Challenge player statistics
Player name	WPr	SWD	BDR	BOL	WPr	SWD	BDR	BOL	GRQ	App	Try	Kck	Pts
Dewald Barnard	1	1	1							3	0	0	0
Tango Balekile	2	2	16 (substituted in)	16 (substituted in)	2	2	2	16 (substituted in)	2	9	3	0	15
Johan van Wyk	3									1	0	0	0
Stefan Willemse	4						7		7	3	1	0	5
Giant Mtyanda	5	5				5		4		4	0	0	0
Brandon Brown	6	6	6			19 (substituted in)	8	6	6	7	3	0	15
Thembelani Bholi	7	7	7				18 (substituted in)	7		5	1	0	5
Lusanda Badiyana	8	8	8	8	8	8		19 (substituted in)	8	8	1	0	5
Stefan Ungerer	9	9	9	9			9	20		5	3	0	15
Garrick Mattheus	10	21 (substituted in)	21 (substituted in)	21 (substituted in)	10	21	21 (substituted in)		21 (substituted in)	7	0	16	16
Alshaun Bock	11	11								2	1	0	5
Neil Maritz	12	13	13	12			14	14	14	7	5	0	25
Siyanda Grey	13			13	22 (substituted in)	22 (substituted in)				4	2	0	10
Jixie Molapo	14									1	0	0	0
Chrysander Botha	15	15			15					3	0	0	0
JP Jamieson	16 (substituted in)									1	0	0	0
Roché van Zyl	17 (substituted in)	17 (substituted in)					17 (substituted in)	3	3	5	0	0	0
Sintu Manjezi	18 (substituted in)	18 (substituted in)	4						4	4	1	0	5
Christiaan de Bruin	19 (substituted in)	4								2	0	0	0
Rouche Nel	20 (substituted in)	20 (substituted in)	22 (substituted in)	14		20 (substituted in)	22 (substituted in)		20 (substituted in)	7	0	0	0
Simon Bolze	21 (substituted in)	10	10	10	14				22 (substituted in)	6	1	19	24
Keanu Vers	22 (substituted in)	14	14	15	11	15	15	11	15	9	6	0	30
Chris Heiberg		3			17 (substituted in)	1	3	17 (substituted in)		5	1	0	5
Johann Tromp		12	15							2	0	0	0
Greg Jackson		16 (substituted in)	2	2	16 (substituted in)					4	1	0	5
Wynand Grassmann		19 (substituted in)	19 (substituted in)	4	4	18 (substituted in)				5	0	0	0
Waylon Murray		22 (substituted in)	12					21 (substituted in)	12	4	1	0	5
Khona Dabula			3							1	0	0	0
Mzwanele Zito			5		5		4	18 (substituted in)		4	0	0	0
Sonwabo Majola			11	11	20 (substituted in)	14	11		11	6	3	0	15
Lupumlo Mguca			17 (substituted in)	3	3	3			17 (substituted in)	5	1	0	5
Kevin Kaba			18 (substituted in)	7	7	7			18 (substituted in)	5	0	0	0
Ricky Schroeder			20 (substituted in)	20 (substituted in)	9	9			9	5	0	0	0
Xandré Vos				1	1	17 (substituted in)	1	1	1	6	0	0	0
Wihan Coetzer				5						1	0	0	0
SF Nieuwoudt				6	6	6	6		19 (substituted in)	5	1	0	5
Sive Mazosiwe				17 (substituted in)						1	0	0	0
Rob Lyons				18 (substituted in)	19 (substituted in)					2	0	0	0
Hayden Tharratt				19 (substituted in)						1	0	0	0
Athi Mayinje				22 (substituted in)	21 (substituted in)	11				3	0	0	0
Michael Brink					12	12	12			3	1	0	5
Wandile Mjekevu					13	13		13		3	1	0	5
Cameron Lindsay					18 (substituted in)	4	5	5	5	5	0	0	0
Pieter-Steyn de Wet						10	10	10	10	4	0	34	34
Robin Stevens						16 (substituted in)			16 (substituted in)	2	0	0	0
Stokkies Hanekom							13	22 (substituted in)	13	3	0	0	0
Mike Willemse							16 (substituted in)	2		2	1	0	5
Zingisa April							19			0	0	0	0
Rudi van Rooyen							20 (substituted in)	9		2	0	0	0
Tyler Paul								8		1	0	0	0
Berton Klaasen								12		1	0	0	0
Malcolm Jaer								15		1	1	0	5
penalty try										–	1	–	7
Total										9	35	69	246

(c) denotes the team captain. For each match, the player's squad number is shown. Starting players are numbered 1 to 15, while the replacements are numbered 16 to 22. If a replacement made an appearance in the match, it is indicated by (substituted in) . "App" refers to the number of appearances made by the player, "Try" to the number of tries scored by the player, "Kck" to the number of points scored via kicks (conversions, penalties or drop goals) and "Pts" refer to the total number of points scored by the player.

- Matt Howes, Vaughen Isaacs, Thapelo Molapo, Sibusiso Ngcokovane, Mabhutana Peter and Janse Roux did not make any appearances.

== See also ==
- Eastern Province Elephants
