= Jho =

Jho is a surname of the following people:

- Andile Jho (born 1992), South African rugby union player
- Jho Low (Low Taek Jho; born 1981), Malaysian businessman
- Kim Jho Gwangsoo (born 1965), South Korean film director, screenwriter, film producer and LGBT rights activist
- Somila Jho (born 1995), South African rugby union player
