= Sintu =

sintu may refer to:

- SiNtu, is a languages group, see Southern Bantu languages
- Sintu Manjezi (born 1996), South African rugby union player
