= Athi Mayinje =

South African rugby union footballer

- Full name: Athenkosi Mayinje
- Born: 18 January 1996 (age 30) Port Elizabeth, South Africa
- Height: 1.76 m (5 ft 9 1/2 in)
- Weight: 89 kg (196 lb; 14 st 0 lb)
- School: Grey High School, Port Elizabeth
- University: Nelson Mandela Metropolitan University

Rugby union career
- Position: Centre / Wing
- Current team: Eastern Province Elephants
Youth career
- 2009–2015: Eastern Province Kings
Senior career
Years	Team	Apps	(Points)
2016–2019	Eastern Province Kings	27	(57)
2021	Griffons	0	(0)
2022–	Eastern Province Elephants		
- Correct as of 29 March 2022

Athenkosi Mayinje (born 18 January 1996) is a South African professional rugby union player for the Griffons (rugby union) in the Currie Cup and in the Rugby Challenge. He usually plays as an outside back .

== Rugby career ==
=== Youth rugby ===
Mayinje earned provincial colours as early as primary school level, when he was selected to represent Eastern Province at the 2009 Under-13 Craven Week tournament held in Kimberley. He started as a winger in their opening match of the tournament against the Lions, before moving to flanker for their remaining matches against KwaZulu-Natal, the Blue Bulls and Western Province. He helped Eastern Province to victories in all four of their matches, including the unofficial final of the tournament against Western Province.

In 2014, he again represented Eastern Province at the Craven Week, this time at the Under-18 tournament for high school pupils, in a tournament held in Middelburg. He was used as a right winger in this competition and scored a try in their opening match of the tournament against the Blue Bulls in a 26–25 victory, another one in their 19–5 victory over the Free State in their second match and a third in their match against SWD, a 25–7 win for Eastern Province in the main match of the final day as they were crowned unofficial champions for the tournament. His three tries were the most by an Eastern Province player during the competition. two behind the top try scorers in the tournament. After the conclusion of the Craven Week tournament, Mayinje was also included in the Eastern Province U19 squad for the 2014 Under-19 Provincial Championship, the first season that the team competed in Group A of the competition, having won promotion from Group B in 2013. He made four appearances off the bench during the competition before starting their final match of the season, a 21–31 defeat to Blue Bulls U19, helping Eastern Province finish in sixth position on the log, avoiding a relegation play-off.

He again represented the Under-19 team during the 2015 Under-19 Provincial Championship Group A, their second season at that level. He started eleven of their twelve matches during the regular season of the competition, scoring tries in matches against Blue Bulls U19, Golden Lions U19 – both home and away – Sharks U19, Free State U19 and Leopards U19. Eastern Province U19 won eleven of their twelve matches to top the log to qualify for a home semi-final. Mayinje started in their 31–15 victory over Free State U19 in the semi-finals, as well as in the final, where he helped his team to a 25–23 victory over Blue Bulls U19 to win the Under-19 title for the first time in their history. His six tries were the joint-second most by an Eastern Province player behind Junior Pokomela and joint-ninth overall in Group A of the competition.

=== Eastern Province Kings ===
Serious financial problems at the Eastern Province Kings at the end of the 2015 season saw a number of first team regulars leave the union and Mayinje was among a number of youngsters that were promoted to the squad that competed in the 2016 Currie Cup qualification series. He was named in the starting lineup for their first match of the season against the SWD Eagles, playing the entire 80 minutes in a 14–37 defeat. He dropped to the reserves bench for their second match of the season, an 18–37 defeat to Boland Cavaliers, but regained his starting spot in their next match against the Border Bulldogs. In his fourth appearance – away to Namibian side Welwitschias in Windhoek – Mayinje scored his first points in first class rugby when he converted centre Somila Jho's 34th minute try. After missing a 52nd-minute penalty attempt, Mayinje scored his first try in first class rugby, getting the last of the EP Kings' five tries in the match. He also converted his own try, helping his side to a 31–18 victory, their first win in the competition. He scored another try in their Round Seven match against a Free State XV, a mere consolation in a 15–35 defeat.
