= Pieter-Steyn de Wet =

South African rugby union player

- Born: 8 January 1991 (age 35) Caledon, South Africa
- Height: 1.79 m (5 ft 10 1/2 in)
- Weight: 87 kg (192 lb; 13 st 10 lb)
- School: Paarl Gimnasium

Rugby union career
- Position: Fly-Half
- Current team: Floirac
Youth career
- 2010: Western Province
- 2011–2012: Free State Cheetahs
Amateur team(s)
Years	Team	Apps	(Points)
2013–2016 2020-	UFS Shimlas	17	(21)
Senior career
Years	Team	Apps	(Points)
2012	Free State XV	4	(0)
2013	Griquas	5	(47)
2014	Free State XV	3	(10)
2014	Griffons	4	(20)
2014	Free State Cheetahs	4	(15)
2016	Free State XV	1	(7)
2016	Griffons	1	(0)
2016–2017	Eastern Province Kings	9	(61)
2017	Southern Kings	13	(44)
2018	Griquas	4	(18)
2018–2020	Aurillac	14	(28)
2020-present	Floirac	3	(33)
- Correct as of 24 June 2020

Pieter-Steyn de Wet (born 8 January 1991) is a South African rugby union player for Floirac in the French Fédérale 1. His usual position is fly-half.

De Wet attended the prestigious Paarl Gymnasium where he formed part of the 2008 1st XV which ended unbeaten and top of the SA schools log. They also destroyed the biggest winning margin record (35–8) in their annual interschools fixture against Paarl Boys' High. A fixture that is regarded as the biggest schoolboy match in the world, attracting crowds from across the globe.

After finishing school, he joined Western Province where he won the u19 Currie Cup with a team filled with future Springboks including Siya Kolisi, Damian de Allende, Eben Etsebeth, Frans Malherbe, Nizaam Carr, Scarra Ntubeni.

After a successful 2010 season with Western Province he agreed terms with SA u/20 coach Pine Pienaar to join the Free State Cheetahs. Pieter enjoyed an extended run in the Cheetahs’ junior- and Vodacom Cup teams and was included in the 2012 senior Currie Cup squad while still under 21. He represented the Shimlas in the 2013 Varsity Cup season making six appearances. He also previously made four substitute appearances for the Free State Cheetahs during the 2012 Vodacom Cup.

In April 2013, he moved west to join the Griquas, who were undergoing a fly-half crisis due to Burton Francis and Francois Brummer being called into the Cheetahs Super Rugby squad. He made his debut in a 47–31 defeat to the Pumas on 5 April 2013 and made five starts.

After his stint with Griquas, he was lured back to Bloemfontein and made his Currie Cup debut for the Free State Cheetahs in Kimberley, converting 3 tries in their 36–25 win over the Griquas. Between 2013 and 2015, de Wet represented the Cheetahs and had stints with the Griquas before signing with the Southern Kings for two seasons.

De Wet represented the Eastern Cape-based side the Southern Kings during the 2016 Currie Cup season and formed part of the 2017 Super Rugby squad. He scored a late try to record a win over the Sharks in Port Elizabeth which highlighted their successful season. He went on to claim 11 selections in the colors of the Southern Kings in their 2017 Super Rugby season before the franchise got promoted to the Guinness PRO14.

He made his Guinness PRO14 debut against the Italian outfit Zebre on 23 September 2017, scoring two conversions and one penalty in their debut campaign before signing a deal to join French Pro D2 side Stade Aurillacois ahead of their 2018/19 season.

In 2020, the newly promoted CM Floirac Rugby kicked off a big recruitment project and surprised with the signing of De Wet from ProD2. He immediately made an impact by scoring all the team's points in their last two encounters and concluded the short three-match season on a 100% kicking record from the tee.
