= Vaughen Isaacs =

South African rugby union player

- Born: 29 March 1999 (age 27) Cradock, Eastern Cape, South Africa
- Height: 1.76 m (5 ft 9 1/2 in)
- Weight: 79 kg (174 lb)
- School: Hoër Landbouskool Marlow

Rugby union career
- Position: Fly-half / Fullback
- Current team: Dallas Jackals
Youth career
- 2010-201?: Eastern Province
Senior career
Years	Team	Apps	(Points)
2018-2019	Blue Bulls XV	1	(9)
2019-2020	Blue Bulls	1	(2)
2022–2023	Golden Lions	11	(64)
2023	Tel Aviv Heat	5	(2)
2024-	Dallas Jackals	1	(8)
- Correct as of 13 March 2024
International career
Years	Team	Apps	(Points)
2016	South Africa Under-16		
2019	South Africa Under-20	4	(5)
- Correct as of 13 March 2024

Vaughen Isaacs (born 29 March 1999) is a South African rugby union player for the Dallas Jackals in the MLR. His regular position is fly-half or fullback.

== Career ==
Isaacs played for Eastern Province from 2010, playing for their youth sides including vice-captaining the side in 2015, in the same year he was selected for the South African under-16 Elite Green Squad. Isaacs made his Currie Cup debut for the Blue Bulls in August 2019, coming on as a replacement fly-half in their final match of the 2019 season against the Sharks. He joined the Golden Lions in 2022.

In 2023 he played for Tel Aviv Heat in Israel, he started in the 2023 Rugby Europe Super Cup final against Black Lion. Tel Aviv Heat losing the match 27-17. He was named in the Dallas Jackals roster for the 2024 Major League Rugby season. He made his debut for Dallas against San Diego Legion in the second round of the 2024 MLR, scoring 8 points in the 23-30 loss.
