= Ricky Schroeder (rugby union) =

South African rugby union player

- Full name: Ricky Darryl Schroeder
- Born: 5 January 1991 (age 35) Worcester, South Africa
- Height: 1.68 m (5 ft 6 in)
- Weight: 75 kg (165 lb; 11 st 11 lb)
- School: Paul Roos Gymnasium, Stellenbosch
- University: University of Cape Town

Rugby union career
- Position: Scrum-half
Youth career
- 2007–2012: Western Province
Amateur team(s)
Years	Team	Apps	(Points)
2011–2013	UCT Ikey Tigers	12	(0)
Senior career
Years	Team	Apps	(Points)
2012–2013	Western Province	7	(0)
2013	→ Boland Cavaliers	10	(0)
2014–2016	Golden Lions XV	28	(10)
2014–2015	Golden Lions	6	(0)
2016–2017	Eastern Province Kings	12	(5)
2017	Southern Kings	2	(0)
- Correct as of 23 April 2018

Ricky Darryl Schroeder (born 5 January 1991, in Worcester) is a former South African rugby union player, who most recently played with the Southern Kings in Super Rugby. His regular position is scrum-half.

He retired from rugby in 2017 and pursued a career in the media, joining the Cape Town-based Kfm 94.5 radio station.

== Career ==
=== Youth and Varsity Rugby ===
He came up through the Western Province youth ranks, representing them at the Under-16 Grant Khomo Week in 2007 and the Under-18 Craven Week tournaments in 2008 and 2009.

In 2010, he was included in the Western Province U19 team for the Under-19 Provincial Championship competition, where he made thirteen appearances. He also captained a side that contained future Springboks such as Eben Etzebeth, Siya Kolisi and Frans Malherbe and eventually won the title, beating the Blue Bulls U19 in the final.

He almost repeated the feat in 2012 with the Western Province U21 side, starting thirteen of their fourteen games during the 2012 Under-21 Provincial Championship season, but this time ending on the losing side against the Blue Bulls U19 team.

He also represented the UCT Ikey Tigers in the 2011, 2012 and 2013 Varsity Cup competitions, picking up another winner's medal in 2011, making four appearances during the campaign, although he was an unused substitute in the final against UP Tuks.

=== Western Province ===
His first class debut came during the 2012 Vodacom Cup season, coming on as a late substitute for Nic Groom in their first match of the season against near neighbours Boland Cavaliers. He appeared an additional four times in that competition, as well as being an unused substitute on five occasions. He made one further appearances for them during the 2013 Vodacom Cup competition.

=== Boland Cavaliers ===
After failing to break into Western Province's Currie Cup team, he then joined Wellington-based side Boland Cavaliers on loan during the 2013 Currie Cup First Division season. He made his Currie Cup debut in their opening day defeat to the Leopards and made a total of three starts and seven substitute appearances.

=== Golden Lions ===
He then moved to Johannesburg to join the Golden Lions on a two-year deal for 2014 and 2015.
