= Garrick Mattheus =

South African rugby union player

- Full name: Garrick Frederick Mattheus
- Born: 23 March 1996 (age 30) Port Elizabeth, South Africa
- Height: 1.84 m (6 ft 1/2 in)
- Weight: 89 kg (196 lb; 14 st 0 lb)
- School: Grey High School
- University: Nelson Mandela Metropolitan University

Rugby union career
- Position: Fly-half / Fullback
- Current team: Eastern Province Elephants
Youth career
- 2014–2017: Eastern Province Kings
Senior career
Years	Team	Apps	(Points)
2016–2017	Eastern Province Kings	16	(82)
2018	Blue Bulls XV	1	(0)
2019–2021	Boland Cavaliers	20	(167)
2022–	Eastern Province Elephants		
- Correct as of 29 March 2022

Garrick Frederick Mattheus (born 23 March 1996) is a South African rugby union player for the Boland Cavaliers in the Currie Cup and the Rugby Challenge. His regular position is fly-half, but he can also play as a fullback. In 2020, he passed at Rugby Club Valpolicella.

== Rugby career ==
=== Youth rugby ===
Mattheus was born in Port Elizabeth, where he attended Grey High School. In 2014, he was selected to represent Eastern Province at the Under-18 Academy Week held in Worcester. His best performance of the tournament came in his first match, as he kicked three penalties and five conversions for a personal points haul of 19 points in their 49–31 victory over the Pumas. Later in the same year, Mattheus was also drafted into the Eastern Province U19 squad that competed for their 2014 Under-19 Provincial Championship campaign. He played off the bench in a 17–13 victory over Free State U19, before starting four of their final five matches of the competition, contributing 18 points with the boot.

He joined the Eastern Province Kings academy on a full-time basis for 2015 and started the Under-19 team's opening match of the 2015 Under-19 Provincial Championship season, a 28–15 victory over Free State U19. However, he lasted just 21 minutes of the match before being suffering a concussion and didn't feature in their next six matches. He made his return as a replacement in their 34–22 victory against Golden Lions U19 and started their 29–10 victory over Free State U19 a week later. He was used as a replacement in their final two matches of the regular season against the Blue Bulls U19s and the Western Province U19s, as Eastern Province finished top of the log, winning eleven of their twelve matches during the season. Mattheus also played off the bench in their 31–15 semi-final victory over Free State, as well in the final, which Eastern Province won by beating the Blue Bulls 25–23 in Johannesburg to win the competition for the first time in their history.

=== Eastern Province Kings ===
In 2016, Mattheus was included in the Eastern Province Kings squad that played in the 2016 Currie Cup qualification series. He made his first class debut in their 19–14 victory over the Blue Bulls on 7 May 2016. It took him just four minutes into his debut to score his first points by kicking his first of four penalties in the match. He also scored a conversion to contribute 14 of his team's 19 points in the win. Big points tallies followed in further games, scoring 15 points with the boot in their 35–all draw against the Golden Lions and 21 points against a Sharks XV through four penalties, two conversions and the first try of his senior career. He finished the competition as the Kings' top scorer with 66 points in his eight appearances.
