= Greg Jackson (rugby union) =

South African rugby union player

- Full name: Gregory Angus Shaw Jackson
- Born: 7 March 1996 (age 30) Pietermaritzburg, South Africa
- Height: 1.84 m (6 ft 1/2 in)
- Weight: 108 kg (238 lb; 17 st 0 lb)
- School: Michaelhouse
- University: Nelson Mandela Metropolitan University

Rugby union career
- Position: Loosehead prop / Hooker
Youth career
- 2014: Sharks
- 2015–2016: Eastern Province Kings
- 2016–2017: Gloucester
Senior career
Years	Team	Apps	(Points)
2016–2017	Eastern Province Kings	6	(10)
- Correct as of 24 May 2018

Gregory Angus Shaw Jackson (born 7 March 1996 in Pietermaritzburg, South Africa) is a South African rugby union player, who most recently played with the Eastern Province Kings. His regular position is loosehead prop or hooker.

== Rugby career ==
=== 2014: Sharks ===
At high school level, he earned one provincial call-up, representing the Sharks at the 2014 Under-18 Academy Week held in Worcester.

=== 2015–2016: Eastern Province Kings ===
After school, he moved to Port Elizabeth to join the Eastern Province Kings academy, where he was included in the Eastern Province U19 squad that competed in the 2015 Under-19 Provincial Championship Group A. He didn't feature in their first six matches of the season, but then played off the bench in their matches in Rounds Eight, Nine and Ten. He was promoted to the starting line-up for the remainder of the competition, helping his side to finish top of the log after winning eleven out of their twelve matches. Jackson started their semi-final match against Free State U19 in Port Elizabeth, which the home side won 31–15, as well as the final, which saw Eastern Province beat Blue Bulls U19s 25–23 in Johannesburg to win the Under-19 Provincial Championship for the first time in their history.

Serious financial problems at the Eastern Province Kings at the end of the 2015 season saw a number of first team regulars leave the union and Jackson was among a number of youngsters that were promoted to the squad that competed in the 2016 Currie Cup qualification series. Jackson was named on the bench for their Round Three match against Eastern Cape rivals the Border Bulldogs and came onto the field in the 53rd minute of the match to make his first class debut. He made his second appearance a month later, again coming on as the hooker replacement in their match against the Golden Lions. Just six minutes after coming on, Jackson his first senior try; it was one of four tries scored by the Kings in a 35–35 all draw in the match in Greenside.

=== 2016–2017: Gloucester ===
Jackson moved to English Premiership side Gloucester in 2016, playing for their A side, Gloucester United.
