= Jixie Molapo =

South African rugby union player

- Full name: Matjikinyane Nkosinathi Molapo
- Born: 2 January 1995 (age 31) Middelburg, South Africa
- Height: 1.83 m (6 ft 0 in)
- Weight: 95 kg (209 lb; 14 st 13 lb)
- School: Hoërskool Ben Vorster, Tzaneen
- University: Nelson Mandela Metropolitan University

Rugby union career
- Position: Winger
Youth career
- 2008–2013: Limpopo Blue Bulls
- 2014–2015: Blue Bulls
Senior career
Years	Team	Apps	(Points)
2016–2017	Eastern Province Kings	4	(0)
- Correct as of 24 May 2018
International career
Years	Team	Apps	(Points)
2012	South Africa Schools	1	(5)
- Correct as of 25 May 2016

Matjikinyane Nkosinathi 'Jixie' Molapo (born 2 January 1995) is a South African professional rugby union player, who most recently played with the Eastern Province Kings. His usually plays as a right winger.

== Career ==
=== Youth ===
Molapo grew up in Tzaneen in Limpopo province and was selected to represent the Limpopo Blue Bulls at various youth levels. He played for them as early as primary school level, when he was included in their squad that played at the Under-13 Craven Week tournament in 2008.

At high school level, he played at the Under-16 Grant Khomo Week held in Queenstown in 2011 and at the premier South African schools tournament, the Under-18 Craven Week, held in Port Elizabeth in 2012. He started all three of their matches, scoring a try in their 68–21 victory over Zimbabwe and another in their 20–7 victory over Border during the tournament. At the conclusion of the tournament, he was also selected in the South Africa Schools squad. He made one appearance for them during the 2012 Under-18 International Series, starting the match against Wales and scoring a try in a 24–16 victory.

He was again selected to represent Limpopo in the 2013 Craven Week tournament which was held in Polokwane and scored a try in their 36–39 loss to Eastern Province Country Districts in the final of his three starts at the tournament.

In 2014, Molapo moved to Pretoria to join the academy of Limpopo's parent union, the Blue Bulls. He was included in the Blue Bulls U19 squad that played in the 2014 Under-19 Provincial Championship. He started in ten matches during the regular season of the competition, scoring two tries in their 36–11 victory over trans-Jukskei rivals, Golden Lions U19 and another two tries in their 50–25 victory over Free State U19. He helped his side finish top of the log after the regular season to qualify for the semi-finals. He started their semi-final match against Sharks U19 and scored one of six tries in a 43–20 victory. He also started the final against Western Province U21 in Cape Town, but ended the match on the losing side as the hosts ran out 33–26 winners.

Molapo was included in the Blue Bulls squad for the 2015 Vodacom Cup, but was not selected in any matchday squad during the competition. He played in for the Blue Bulls U21 team in the 2015 Under-21 Provincial Championship Group A, starting their first six matches of the competition. He scored tries in their victories over Eastern Province U21 and Leopards U21, but went off injured in their match against Western Province U21 and played no further part in the remainder of the competition.

=== Eastern Province Kings ===
At the start of 2016, Molapo joined the Eastern Province Kings. Serious financial problems at the Port Elizabeth-based side saw a number of first team regulars leave the union and Molapo was among a number of youngsters that were included in their squad that competed in the 2016 Currie Cup qualification series. He was named in the starting lineup for their first match of the season against the SWD Eagles, playing the entire 80 minutes in a 14–37 defeat. He also started their second match of the season away to the Boland Cavaliers, but was once again forced off through injury.
