= Andile Jho =

South African rugby union player

- Born: 21 April 1992 (age 34) King William's Town
- Height: 1.73 m (5 ft 8 in)
- Weight: 83 kg (183 lb; 13 st 1 lb)
- School: Dale College
- University: Nelson Mandela Metropolitan University

Rugby union career
- Position: Centre
Youth career
- 2005–2010: Border Bulldogs
- 2011–2012: Blue Bulls
Amateur team(s)
Years	Team	Apps	(Points)
2014–2017	NMMU Madibaz	19	(0)
Senior career
Years	Team	Apps	(Points)
2013–2018	Eastern Province Elephants	16	(10)
- Correct as of 24 May 2018
International career
Years	Team	Apps	(Points)
2009	S.A. Schools	2	(5)
2009	S.A. Schools High Performance	1	(0)
- Correct as of 4 April 2013

Andile Jho is a South African rugby union player who last played for the Eastern Province Elephants in the Currie Cup and in the Rugby Challenge. His regular position is centre.

== Rugby career ==
He played for Border Bulldogs in various youth tournaments between 2005 and 2010. His performances lead to him being included in the South Africa Under–16 Elite squad in 2008, the Under–18 High Performance squads in 2009 and 2010 and the S.A. Schools squad in 2009.

He then joined the Blue Bulls academy, playing for them at Under–19 level in 2011 and Under–21 level in 2012.

In 2013, he joined the Eastern Province Kings. He was included in the 2013 Vodacom Cup squad, where he was an unused substitute against the Pampas XV, but made his debut against Free State XV.

== Personal life ==
He is the older brother of Somila Jho, who also played first class rugby for the Eastern Province Kings. On 14 May 2016, the two brothers played together in a first class match for the first time when they were named as the starting centre-pairing for their 2016 Currie Cup qualification defeat to Western Province in Cape Town. Andile scored his first senior try in this match in a 10–50 defeat.
