= Somila Jho =

South African rugby union player

- Born: 25 August 1995 (age 31) King William's Town, South Africa
- Height: 1.80 m (5 ft 11 in)
- Weight: 90 kg (200 lb; 14 st 2 lb)
- School: Dale College, King William's Town; Kingswood College, Grahamstown
- University: Nelson Mandela Metropolitan University
- Notable relative: Andile Jho (brother)

Rugby union career
- Position: Centre
Youth career
- 2011–2013: Border Bulldogs
- 2015–2017: Eastern Province Kings
Senior career
Years	Team	Apps	(Points)
2016	Eastern Province Kings	13	(25)
2018	Border Bulldogs	14	(20)
- Correct as of 27 October 2018

Somila Jho (born 25 August 1995 in King William's Town, South Africa) is a South African rugby union player who last played for the Border Bulldogs in the Currie Cup and in the Rugby Challenge. His regular position is outside centre.

== Rugby career ==
=== Youth rugby ===
Jho attended Dale College in his home town of King William's Town and played first team rugby for them for three years from 2011 to 2013. He also represented his local provincial side, the Border Bulldogs, during this time. In 2011, he played at the Under-16 Grant Khomo Week held in nearby Queenstown, playing as a flanker for Border in matches against KwaZulu-Natal and Boland scoring a try in the latter match. He was included in their squad for the Under-18 Craven Week – South Africa's most prestigious high schools rugby union tournament – in both 2012 and 2013. He was mainly used as a replacement during the 2012 tournament held in Port Elizabeth, but still weighed in with a try in their defeat to Limpopo. He started all three their matches at the 2013 event; after scoring a try in their 38–20 victory over Namibia in the first match, he also scored a brace in their 37–19 victory in the second match to finish the tournament as their second-highest try-scorer.

At the end of 2013, Jho moved to Grahamstown to enroll at Kingswood College, which is in the Eastern Province Kings' catchment area and he subsequently joined the academy of the Port Elizabeth-based union for the 2015 season. He played in all twelve of Eastern Province U21s' matches during the 2015 Under-21 Provincial Championship, the first season that the team competed in Group A of this competition, having won promotion from Group B in 2014. Jho was one of the top performers for a team that struggled to adjust at this level (winning just one of their matches), scoring five tries in the competition. His first try came in their Round Three match in a 13–44 defeat to Western Province U21 and he followed this up with braces in their only win of the competition against Sharks U21 – winning 25–15 – and against Free State U21 in a 15–33 defeat in Round Ten. His five tries were the most by any Eastern Province player and he was also the team's second-highest points scorer, with his contribution of 25 points just four less than that of fly-half MC Venter.

=== Eastern Province Kings ===
Serious financial problems at the Eastern Province Kings at the end of the 2015 season saw a number of first team regulars leave the union and Jho was among a number of youngsters that were promoted to the squad that competed in the 2016 Currie Cup qualification series. He was named in the starting lineup for their first match of the season against the SWD Eagles, playing the entire 80 minutes in a 14–37 defeat. He started their second match of the season away to the Boland Cavaliers in a match that saw Jho score the first senior try of his career in an 18–37 defeat. After starting their next match against the Border Bulldogs, he scored another try away to Namibian side Welwitschias in a 31–18 victory, his team's first win in the competition. A third try followed in their Round Seven match against a Free State XV, but was a mere consolation in a 15–35 defeat.

== Personal life ==
He is the younger brother of Andile Jho, who also played first class rugby for the Eastern Province Kings. On 14 May 2016, the two brothers played together in a first class match for the first time when they were named as the starting centre-pairing for their 2016 Currie Cup qualification defeat to Western Province in Cape Town.
