= Sintu Manjezi =

South African rugby union player

- Born: 7 April 1995 (age 31) East London, South Africa
- Height: 1.97 m (6 ft 5 1/2 in)
- Weight: 114 kg (251 lb; 17 st 13 lb)
- School: St. Andrew's College, Grahamstown
- University: Nelson Mandela Metropolitan University

Rugby union career
- Position: Lock / Flanker
- Current team: Glasgow Warriors
Youth career
- 2011–2016: Eastern Province Kings
Senior career
Years	Team	Apps	(Points)
2016–2017	Eastern Province Kings	15	(5)
2016	Southern Kings	2	(0)
2017–2018	Griquas	21	(0)
2018–2020	Cheetahs	25	(15)
2019	Free State Cheetahs	8	(0)
2020–2022	Bulls	6	(0)
2020–2022	Blue Bulls	7	(0)
2022–2024	Glasgow Warriors	23	(5)
2024-	Bulls	0	(0)
- Correct as of 20 November 2022

Sintu Manjezi (born 7 April 1995 in East London, South Africa) is a South African rugby union player for the Bulls in the United Rugby Championship and the Blue Bulls in the Currie Cup. His regular position is lock or blindside flanker.

== Rugby career ==
=== 2011–13: Under-16 and Under-18 rugby ===
Manjezi played rugby for his secondary school, St. Andrew's College in Grahamstown, playing for the first team between 2011 and 2013, captaining the side in 2013.

He earned his first provincial selection in 2011, when he represented the Eastern Province at the Under-16 Grant Khomo Week held in Queenstown. He started all three of their matches and scored a try in their game against SWD Eagles. After the tournament, he was included in a South African Under-16 High Performance squad.

In 2012, despite still being in the Under-17 age group, he was selected to represent Eastern Province Country Districts at the premier schools tournament in South Africa, the Under-18 Craven Week, held in Port Elizabeth, starting a 28–27 victory over Griquas Country Districts. He returned to the 2013 edition of the tournament held in Polokwane. He started three matches and scored tries against the Leopards and Limpopo Blue Bulls.

=== 2014–: Under-19, Under-21 and Currie Cup rugby ===
In 2014, he joined the Eastern Province academy; he was included in the Eastern Province U19 squad that participated in Group A of the 2014 Under-19 Provincial Championship for the first time following promotion from Group B at the end of 2013. He immediately established himself as a key player for the team and started all twelve of their matches in the number five jersey. He helped them to sixth position on the log, winning four of their twelve matches.

He didn't play any rugby in 2015, but, following serious financial problems at the Eastern Province Kings at the end of the 2015 season which saw a number of first team regulars leave the union, Manjezi was among a number of youngsters that were promoted to the squad that competed in the 2016 Currie Cup qualification series, also being named vice-captain of the team. He was named in the starting lineup for their first match of the season against the SWD Eagles, playing the entire 80 minutes of a 14–37 defeat.

In July, Manjezi was drafted into the Southern Kings Super Rugby squad and named on the bench for their Round Sixteen match against the Lions.

== Honours ==
- Currie Cup winner 2020–21
- United Rugby Championship winner [2023-24]
- Super Rugby Unlocked [2021]

== Cricket ==
In addition to playing rugby, Manjezi also played cricket at youth provincial level, representing the Eastern Province Under-19 team in 2012 and 2013.
