= 2016 Under-21 Provincial Championship =

- Countries: South Africa
- Date: 5 August – 22 October 2016
- Champions: Golden Lions U21
- Runners-up: Western Province U21
- Matches played: 24
- Tries scored: 179 (average 7.5 per match)
- Top point scorer: Shaun Reynolds (112)
- Top try scorer: Tristan Blewett and Elden Schoeman (6)

The 2016 Under-21 Provincial Championship was the 2016 edition of the Under-21 Provincial Championship, an annual national Under-21 rugby union competition held in South Africa, and was contested from 5 August to 22 October 2016. The competition was won by Golden Lions U21 who beat Western Province U21 38–34 in the final played on 22 October 2016.

== Competition rules and information ==
There was seven participating teams in the 2016 Under-21 Provincial Championship. These teams played each other once over the course of the season, either at home or away.

Teams received four points for a win and two points for a draw. Bonus points were awarded to teams that scored four or more tries in a game, as well as to teams that lost a match by seven points or less. Teams were ranked by log points, then points difference (points scored less points conceded).

The top four teams qualified for the title play-off semi-finals. The team that finished first had home advantage against the team that finished fourth, while the team that finished second had home advantage against the team that finished third. The final was played as a curtain raiser for the 2016 Currie Cup Premier Division final.

== Teams ==
Location of teams in the 2016 Under-21 Provincial Championship

The following teams took part in the 2016 Under-21 Provincial Championship:

2016 Under-21 Provincial Championship teams
Team name	Stadium
Blue Bulls U21	Loftus Versfeld, Pretoria
Eastern Province U21	Nelson Mandela Bay Stadium, Port Elizabeth
Free State U21	Free State Stadium, Bloemfontein
Golden Lions U21	Ellis Park Stadium, Johannesburg
Leopards U21	Olën Park, Potchefstroom
Sharks U21	Kings Park Stadium, Durban
Western Province U21	Newlands Stadium, Cape Town

== Standings ==
The final league standings for the 2016 Under-21 Provincial Championship was:

2016 Under-21 Provincial Championship standings
Pos	Team	P	W	D	L	PF	PA	PD	TF	TA	TB	LB	Pts
1	Western Province U21	6	4	1	1	200	140	+60	28	17	6	1	25
2	Golden Lions U21	6	5	0	1	198	144	+54	22	21	2	1	23
3	Blue Bulls U21	6	3	1	2	185	171	+14	26	22	4	2	20
4	Free State U21	6	3	0	3	177	184	−7	24	21	4	1	17
5	Eastern Province U21	6	3	0	3	164	155	+9	19	19	2	2	16
6	Sharks U21	6	2	0	4	152	189	−37	20	25	2	2	12
7	Leopards U21	6	0	0	6	153	246	−93	22	36	4	2	6
Final standings.

Legend and competition rules
Legend:
The top four teams qualified to the semi-finals.	P = Games played, W = Games won, D = Games drawn, L = Games lost, PF = Points for, PA = Points against, PD = Points difference, TF = Tries for, TA = Tries against, TB = Try bonus points, LB = Losing bonus points, Pts = Log points
Competition rules:
Play-offs: The top four teams qualified to the semi-finals, with the higher-placed team having home advantage. Points breakdown: * 4 points for a win * 2 points for a draw * 1 bonus point for a loss by seven points or less * 1 bonus point for scoring four or more tries in a match

=== Round-by-round ===
The table below shows each team's progression throughout the season. For each round, their cumulative points total is shown with the overall log position in brackets:

Team Progression – 2016 Under-21 Provincial Championship
Team	R1	R2	R3	R4	R5	R6	R7	R8	Semi	Final
Western Province U21	3 (2nd)	3 (5th)	8 (3rd)	10 (3rd)	15 (1st)	20 (1st)	25 (1st)	25 (1st)	Won	Lost
Golden Lions U21	0 (5th)	5 (2nd)	6 (4th)	10 (2nd)	14 (3rd)	14 (4th)	19 (3rd)	23 (2nd)	Won	Won
Blue Bulls U21	3 (2nd)	4 (4th)	9 (2nd)	10 (5th)	15 (2nd)	20 (2nd)	20 (2nd)	20 (3rd)	Lost	—
Free State U21	5 (1st)	10 (1st)	11 (1st)	11 (1st)	11 (4th)	15 (3rd)	17 (3rd)	17 (4th)	Lost	—
Eastern Province U21	0 (5th)	4 (3rd)	4 (6th)	9 (6th)	10 (5th)	10 (6th)	15 (5th)	16 (5th)	—	—
Sharks U21	0 (5th)	1 (6th)	6 (5th)	10 (4th)	10 (6th)	11 (5th)	12 (5th)	12 (6th)	—	—
Leopards U21	1 (4th)	1 (7th)	3 (7th)	3 (7th)	3 (7th)	4 (7th)	6 (7th)	6 (7th)	—	—
Key:	win	draw	loss	bye						

== Matches ==
The following matches were played in the 2016 Under-21 Provincial Championship:

=== Round one ===
5 August 2016	Blue Bulls U21	29–29	Western Province U21	Loftus Versfeld, Pretoria
14:45	Try: Ruben van Heerden 6'; Dewald Naudé 32'; Ivan van Zyl 66'; JT Jackson 71'; Con: Tinus de Beer 33' (1/2); JT Jackson 67', 72' (2/2); Pen: Ruben van Heerden (0/1); Tinus de Beer 23' (1/1); JT Jackson (0/1)	Report; Scoreboard	Try: Grant Hermanus 10'; Ryan Oosthuizen 26'; Rabz Maxwane 45'; Frans van Wyk 58'; Con: Grant Hermanus 27', 46', 59' (3/4); Pen: Grant Hermanus 49' (1/2)	Referee: Vusi Msibi

6 August 2016	Leopards U21	26–43	Free State U21	Olën Park, Potchefstroom
12:30	Try: Elden Schoeman 32', 41'; Jimmy Mpailane 67'; Wessel Steyn 76'; Con: Julian Delicado 33' (1/2); Marco Donges 68', 77' (2/2)	Report; Scoreboard	Try: Ali Mgijima 6'; Jasper Wiese 9', 26'; Gerrie Labuschagné 34'; TJ Goddard 52'; Fiffy Rampeta 73'; Con: Gerrie Labuschagné 7', 10', 35', 53', 74' (5/6); Pen: Gerrie Labuschagné 20' (1/1)	Referee: Stephan Geldenhuys

Bye/s: Eastern Province U21, Golden Lions U21, Sharks U21

=== Round two ===
12 August 2016	Sharks U21	21–23	Eastern Province U21	Growthpoint Kings Park, Durban
17:10	Try: Tristan Blewett 21'; Marcel Coetzee 41'; Graham Geldenhuys 45'; Con: Jaywinn Juries 22' (1/1); Ruben de Vos 42', 46' (2/2); Pen: Jaywinn Juries (0/1); Cards: Ayron Schramm (yellow card) 24' to 34'	Report; Scoreboard	Try: JP Jamieson 12'; Malcolm Jaer 34'; Con: Garrick Mattheus 13', 35' (2/2); Pen: Garrick Mattheus 3', 16' (2/3); Simon Bolze (0/1); Malcolm Jaer 81' (1/1); Cards: Jeremy Ward (yellow card) 52' to 63'	Referee: Stephan Geldenhuys

13 August 2016	Golden Lions U21	41–22	Leopards U21	Emirates Airline Park, Johannesburg
12:15	Try: James Venter 2'; Wiehan Jacobs 18'; Kyle Kruger 30'; Marco Jansen van Vuren 52'; Siya Masuku 63'; Ronald Brown 81'; Con: Shaun Reynolds 3', 19', 53', 82' (4/6); Pen: Shaun Reynolds 10' (1/1)	Report; Scoreboard	Try: Wessel Steyn 15'; Tapiwa Mafura 42'; Elden Schoeman 69'; Con: Julian Delicado 43' (1/2); Marco Donges 70' (1/1); Pen: Julian Delicado 6' (1/2)	Referee: Jaco Pretorius

13 August 2016	Free State U21	26–20	Blue Bulls U21	Free State Stadium, Bloemfontein
14:15	Try: Carel-Jan Coetzee 52', 80'; Jasper Wiese 65'; TJ Goddard 77'; Con: Gerrie Labuschagné 53', 78', 80' (3/4); Pen: Gerrie Labuschagné (0/1)	Report; Scoreboard	Try: Divan Rossouw 43'; Dewald Naudé 62'; Con: Tinus de Beer 44', 63' (2/2); Pen: Tinus de Beer 13', 39' (2/2); JT Jackson (0/1); Cards: Njabulo Gumede (yellow card) 67'	Attendance: 100; Referee: Archie Sehlako

Bye/s: Western Province U21

=== Round three ===
19 August 2016	Western Province U21	46–28	Free State U21	DHL Newlands, Cape Town
14:15	Try: Frans van Wyk 16'; Duncan Saal 18'; Jaco Coetzee 20'; Jaco Willemse 30', 35'; Christo van der Merwe 80'; Con: Grant Hermanus 17', 19', 21', 31', 36' (5/6); Pen: Grant Hermanus 13', 77' (2/2); Cards: Jaco Coetzee (yellow card) 28' to 38'	Report; Scoreboard	Try: TJ Goddard 25'; JP Coetzee 37'; Jasper Wiese 55'; Reinach Venter 64'; Con: Gerrie Labuschagné 26', 38', 56', 65' (4/4); Cards: Joseph Dweba (yellow card) 16' to 26'; Darren Baron (yellow card) 70'	Referee: Stephan Geldenhuys

19 August 2016	Blue Bulls U21	29–28	Golden Lions U21	Loftus Versfeld, Pretoria
16:55	Try: Franco Naudé 30'; Marco van Staden 44'; Keanan van Wyk 51'; Adrian Maebane 73'; Con: Tinus de Beer 45', 52', 74' (3/4); Pen: Tinus de Beer 3' (1/2)	Report; Scoreboard	Try: Godfrey Ramaboea 28'; Jo-Hanko de Villiers 55'; Pieter Jansen 70'; Con: Siya Masuku 29', 71' (2/3); Pen: Siya Masuku 2', 37' (2/2); Kobus Engelbrecht 20' (1/2); Cards: Rhyno Herbst (yellow card) 64' to 74'	Referee: Lourens van der Merwe

20 August 2016	Leopards U21	33–38	Sharks U21	Olën Park, Potchefstroom
12:30	Try: Tiaan Bezuidenhout 35', 39'; Sydney du Plessis 44'; Timothy Prince 60'; Dolf van Deventer 63'; Con: Julian Delicado 36', 40', 45', 61' (4/5); Pen: Julian Delicado (0/1); Cards: Nkululeko Mcuma (yellow card) 28' to 38'; Tapiwa Mafura (yellow card) 56' to 66'	Report; Scoreboard	Try: Morné Joubert 10'; Malcolm Cele 14'; Kerron van Vuuren 53'; Tristan Blewett 58'; Mthunzi Moloi 69'; Con: Jaywinn Juries 54', 70' (2/5); Pen: Jaywinn Juries 28', 42', 47' (3/3); Cards: Tristan Blewett (yellow card) 38' to 48'	Referee: Jaco Kotze

Bye/s: Eastern Province U21

=== Round four ===
26 August 2016	Golden Lions U21	26–24	Western Province U21	Emirates Airline Park, Johannesburg
14:15	Try: Ronald Brown 35'; Morné Moos 52'; Con: Shaun Reynolds 36', 53' (2/2); Pen: Shaun Reynolds 3', 43', 65', 72' (4/5); Cards: Jo-Hanko de Villiers (yellow card) 68'	Report; Scoreboard	Try: Heinrich Buhr 11'; Jaco Coetzee 57'; Rabz Maxwane 63', 69'; Con: Grant Hermanus 64', 70' (2/4); Pen: Grant Hermanus (0/1); Cards: Frans van Wyk (yellow card) 71'	Referee: Archie Sehlako

26 August 2016	Eastern Province U21	38–3	Leopards U21	Nelson Mandela Bay Stadium, Port Elizabeth
15:00	Try: Somila Jho 3', 35'; Jayson Reinecke 11'; Lindelwe Zungu 16'; Malcolm Jaer 41'; Jeremy Ward 64'; Con: Garrick Mattheus 4', 12', 36', 42' (4/6)	Report; Scoreboard	Pen: Marco Donges 8' (1/1); Cards: Timothy Prince (yellow card) 49' to 59'	Referee: Ben Crouse

27 August 2016	Sharks U21	23–21	Blue Bulls U21	Growthpoint Kings Park, Durban
16:00	Try: Tristan Blewett 11', 59'; Michael Meyer 26'; Con: Jaywinn Juries 27' (1/2); Ruben de Vos (0/1); Pen: Ruben de Vos 65', 69' (2/2)	Report; Scoreboard	Try: Ruben van Heerden 38'; Mervano da Silva 56'; Dewald Naudé 79'; Con: Tinus de Beer 39', 57', 80' (3/3)	Referee: AJ Jacobs

Bye/s: Free State U21

=== Round five ===
2 September 2016	Blue Bulls U21	34–27	Eastern Province U21	Loftus Versfeld, Pretoria
16:35	Try: Alandré van Rooyen 35'; Ivan van Zyl 45'; JT Jackson 52'; Mervano da Silva 71', 80'; Con: Tinus de Beer 53', 72', 81' (3/5); Pen: Tinus de Beer 51' (1/1); Cards: Theo Maree (yellow card) 66' to 78'	Report; Scoreboard	Try: Jeremy Ward 14'; Michael Brink 68'; Malcolm Jaer 78'; Con: Garrick Mattheus 15', 69', 78' (3/3); Pen: Garrick Mattheus 39', 55' (2/2); Cards: JP Jamieson (yellow card) 59' to 69'	Referee: Francois Pretorius

3 September 2016	Free State U21	12–29	Golden Lions U21	Free State Stadium, Bloemfontein
12:30	Try: JP Coetzee 17'; Mosolwa Mafuma 69'; Con: Darren Baron (0/1); Gerrie Labuschagné 70' (1/1); Pen: Darren Baron (0/1)	Report; Scoreboard	Try: Marco Jansen van Vuren 50'; Godfrey Ramaboea 58'; Con: Shaun Reynolds 51', 59' (2/2); Pen: Shaun Reynolds 19', 26', 75' (3/4); Drop: Shaun Reynolds 40', 66' (2/2)	Attendance: 300; Referee: Ben Crouse

3 September 2016	Western Province U21	40–16	Sharks U21	DHL Newlands, Cape Town
14:15	Try: Eduan Keyter 12'; Ryan Oosthuizen 16'; Herschel Jantjies 51'; David Ribbans 69'; Eduard Zandberg 79'; Con: Brandon Thomson 13' (1/2); Grant Hermanus 52', 80' (2/3); Pen: Grant Hermanus 34', 41', 66' (3/5)	Report; Scoreboard	Try: Malcolm Cele 31'; Con: Damian Stevens 32' (1/1); Pen: Damian Stevens 21', 38' (2/2); Cards: Marius Louw (yellow card) 12' to 22'	Referee: Quinton Immelman

Bye/s: Leopards U21

=== Round six ===
9 September 2016	Eastern Province U21	10–27	Western Province U21	Hoërskool Framesby, Port Elizabeth
15:00	Try: Jixie Molapo 15'; Con: Garrick Mattheus 16' (1/1); Pen: Simon Bolze 57' (1/1)	Report; Scoreboard	Try: Christo van der Merwe 29'; Herschel Jantjies 37'; Eduan Keyter 50'; Mitchell Carstens 70'; Con: Brandon Thomson 30', 38' (2/4); Pen: Brandon Thomson 10' (1/1); Cards: Ryan Oosthuizen (yellow card) 59' to 69'; Grant Hermanus (red card) 64'	Referee: Jaco Pretorius

10 September 2016	Leopards U21	38–52	Blue Bulls U21	Olën Park, Potchefstroom
13:00	Try: Tapiwa Mafura 5'; Wilbri Gunter 47'; Dolf van Deventer 61'; Garann Kriek 68'; Elden Schoeman 79'; Con: Marco Donges 6', 80' (2/5); Pen: Marco Donges 16', 20' (2/2); Drop: Marco Donges 14' (1/1)	Report; Scoreboard	Try: Dewald Naudé 17'; Ivan van Zyl 24'; Franco Naudé 27', 43', 71'; Manie Libbok 38'; Marco van Staden 51'; Adrian Maebane 81'; Con: Tinus de Beer 18', 25', 28', 44', 52', 82' (6/8)	Referee: Sindile Ngcese

10 September 2016	Sharks U21	18–24	Free State U21	Growthpoint Kings Park, Durban
14:50	Try: Tristan Blewett 31', 37'; Con: Benhard Janse van Rensburg 38' (1/2); Pen: Benhard Janse van Rensburg 19', 24' (2/5)	Report; Scoreboard	Try: Günther Janse van Vuuren 39'; Nardus Erasmus 62'; Lorenzo Gordon 74'; Con: Gerrie Labuschagné 40', 63' (2/2); Heinrich Bitzi 75' (1/1); Pen: Gerrie Labuschagné 11' (1/2); Heinrich Bitzi (0/1)	Referee: AJ Jacobs

Bye/s: Golden Lions U21

=== Round seven ===
15 September 2016	Free State U21	44–45	Eastern Province U21	Free State Stadium, Bloemfontein
16:45	Try: penalty try 19'; Nardus Erasmus 22'; Gerrie Labuschagné 49'; Dian Badenhorst 61'; Fiffy Rampeta 65'; Con: Heinrich Bitzi 20', 23', 50', 62', 66' (5/5); Pen: Heinrich Bitzi 8', 31', 75' (3/3); Cards: Ruben Schoeman (yellow card) 15' to 26'	Report; Scoreboard	Try: Keanu Vers 16', 43'; Malcolm Jaer 25'; Jixie Molapo 34'; Xandré Vos 80'; Con: Garrick Mattheus 17', 26', 44', 80' (4/5); Pen: Garrick Mattheus 12', 29', 39', 57' (4/4); Cards: Justin Hollis (yellow card) 21' to 29'	Attendance: 300; Referee: Jaco Peyper

16 September 2016	Golden Lions U21	48–36	Sharks U21	Emirates Airline Park, Johannesburg
16:00	Try: Jo-Hanko de Villiers 3'; Clinton Theron 7'; Kobus Engelbrecht 15'; James Venter 18', 55'; Godfrey Ramaboea 43'; FP Pelser 68'; Con: Shaun Reynolds 8', 16', 19', 56', 69' (5/7); Pen: Shaun Reynolds 32' (1/1); Cards: Jarryd Sage (yellow card) 34' to 44'	Report; Scoreboard	Try: Morné Joubert 11', 71', 80'; Marcel Coetzee 38'; Bandisa Ndlovu 47'; Ayron Schramm 59'; Con: Benhard Janse van Rensburg 48', 60' (2/4); Marius Louw 72' (1/1); Morné Joubert (0/1)	Referee: AJ Jacobs

17 September 2016	Western Province U21	34–31	Leopards U21	DHL Newlands, Cape Town
14:15	Try: Luke Stringer 20'; Christo van der Merwe 37', 64'; Edwill van der Merwe 44'; Aidynn Cupido 51'; Con: Aidynn Cupido 21', 38', 52' (3/5); Pen: Dennis Cox 79' (1/1)	Report; Scoreboard	Try: Elden Schoeman 4', 15'; Akhona Nela 32'; Wessel Steyn 59'; Wilbri Gunter 68'; Con: Marco Donges 5', 16', 33' (3/4); Julian Delicado (0/1); Pen: Marco Donges (0/2)	Referee: Shuhei Kubo

Bye/s: Blue Bulls U21

=== Round eight ===
24 September 2016	Eastern Province U21	21–26	Golden Lions U21	Nelson Mandela Bay Stadium, Port Elizabeth
14:30	Try: Garrick Mattheus 56'; Jixie Molapo 72'; Con: Garrick Mattheus 57' (1/2); Pen: Garrick Mattheus 9', 19', 39' (3/3); Drop: Garrick Mattheus (0/1)	Report; Scoreboard	Try: James Venter 26'; Jarryd Sage 52'; Con: Shaun Reynolds 27', 53' (2/2); Pen: Shaun Reynolds 2', 12', 75' (3/5); Kobus Engelbrecht 77' (1/1); Cards: Jo-Hanko de Villiers (yellow card) 80'	Referee: Egon Seconds

Bye/s: Blue Bulls U21, Free State U21, Leopards U21, Sharks U21, Western Province U21

=== Semi-finals ===
14 October 2016	Western Province U21	26–23	Free State U21	City Park Stadium, Athlone
15:00	Try: Rabz Maxwane 17'; Percy Mngadi 22'; Jaco Coetzee 62'; Con: Grant Hermanus 18' (1/3); Pen: Grant Hermanus 4', 12', 42' (3/4)	Report; Scoreboard	Try: Carel-Jan Coetzee 15'; Jasper Wiese 32'; Con: Heinrich Bitzi 16', 33' (2/2); Pen: Heinrich Bitzi 3', 7', 30' (3/3); Cards: Daniel Maartens (yellow card) 22' to 32'; JP Coetzee (yellow card) 61' to 71'	Referee: Egon Seconds

14 October 2016	Golden Lions U21	37–15	Blue Bulls U21	Ellis Park Stadium, Johannesburg
14:00	Try: Ronald Brown 38'; Shaun Reynolds 65'; Le Roux Baard 75', 78'; Con: Shaun Reynolds 39', 66', 76', 79' (4/4); Pen: Shaun Reynolds 7', 30' (2/3); Drop: Shaun Reynolds 45' (1/1)	Report; Scoreboard	Try: Keanan van Wyk 18'; Alandré van Rooyen 59'; Con: Tinus de Beer 60' (1/2); Pen: Tinus de Beer 28' (1/2); Cards: Matthys Basson (yellow card) 64' to 76'	Referee: Lourens van der Merwe

=== Final ===
22 October 2016	Western Province U21	34–38	Golden Lions U21	Free State Stadium, Bloemfontein
13:00	Try: Rabz Maxwane 14'; Jacques Vermeulen 43'; Justin Phillips 55'; Con: Grant Hermanus 44', 56' (2/3); Pen: Grant Hermanus 12', 28', 50', 63', 74' (5/5); Drop: Grant Hermanus (0/1); Cards: Justin Phillips (yellow card) 68' to 78'	Report; Scoreboard	Try: Curtis Jonas 8'; Kobus Engelbrecht 47'; Marco Jansen van Vuren 72'; Jarryd Sage 77'; Con: Shaun Reynolds 8', 73', 78' (3/4); Pen: Shaun Reynolds 5', 38', 52', 69' (4/4); Drop: Curtis Jonas (0/1)	Referee: AJ Jacobs

== Honours ==
The honour roll for the 2016 Under-21 Provincial Championship was:

2016 Under-21 Provincial Championship Honours
Champions:	Golden Lions U21
Top Try Scorers:	Tristan Blewett, Sharks U21 and Elden Schoeman, Leopards U21 (6)
Top Points Scorer:	Shaun Reynolds, Golden Lions U21 (112)

== Players ==
=== Squads ===
The following squads were named for the 2016 Under-21 Provincial Championship:

Blue Bulls U21 squad
Forwards	Matthys Basson • Jan-Henning Campher • Mervano da Silva • Aston Fortuin • Stefaan Grundlingh • Njabulo Gumede • Jaco Holtzhausen • Brian Leitch • Sam Mitchell • Abongile Nonkontwana • Eli Snyman • Jsuan-re Swanepoel • Gavin van den Berg • Dean van der Westhuizen • Ruben van Heerden • Luigy van Jaarsveld • Alandré van Rooyen • Marco van Staden • Did not play: • Wynand de Necker • JD Fourie • Arnold Gerber • Denzel Hill • Madot Mabokela • Jozua Naudé • Menzi Nhlabathi • PJ Toerien • Franco van den Berg • Jan van der Merwe • Salmon van Huyssteen
Backs	Tinus de Beer • Stephan Enslin • Dewald Human • JT Jackson • Manie Libbok • Adrian Maebane • Theo Maree • Dewald Naudé • Franco Naudé • Divan Rossouw • Keanan van Wyk • Ivan van Zyl • Kurt Webster • Did not play: • Heino Bezuidenhout • Simon Bezuidenhout • Daylan Daniels • Jerry Danquah • Corné de Klerk • Keanu Langeveldt • Tshepiso Mahasha • Raegan Oranje • Brendan Owen • Sipho Phiri
Coach	Pote Human

Eastern Province U21 squad
Forwards	Lusanda Badiyana • Wihan Coetzer • Wynand Grassmann • Jedwyn Harty • Justin Hollis • Gerrit Huisamen • JP Jamieson • Arno Lotter • Rob Lyons • David Murray • SF Nieuwoudt • NJ Oosthuizen • Jayson Reinecke • Hayden Tharratt • Roché van Zyl • Xandré Vos • Did not play: • Tango Balekile • JP Barkhuizen • Ronnie Beyl • Matt Howes • Sintu Manjezi • Junior Pokomela • Tyler Paul • Elandré van der Merwe
Backs	Simon Bolze • Michael Brink • Luvo Claassen • Malcolm Jaer • Somila Jho • Garrick Mattheus • Jixie Molapo • Rouche Nel • Sibusiso Ngcokovane • Luan Nieuwoudt • Mabhutana Peter • Stephen Rautenbach • Keanu Vers • Jeremy Ward • Lindelwe Zungu • Did not play: • Nathan Augustus • Davron Cameron • Avelo Jubase • Jordan Koekemoer • Athi Mayinje

Free State U21 squad
Forwards	Erich de Jager • Joseph Dweba • Nardus Erasmus • Johann Grundlingh • Günther Janse van Vuuren • Johan Kotze • Daniel Maartens • Gopolang Molefe • Fiffy Rampeta • Ruben Schoeman • Robin Stevens • Reinach Venter • Brendan Verster • Ntokozo Vidima • Quintin Vorster • Jasper Wiese • Did not play: • Janu Botha • Junior Burger • Tienie Burger • Benjamin Jansen van Vuuren • Alex Jonker • Willem Daniel Koegelenberg • Willandré Kotzenberg • Johannes Labuschagné • Victor Maruping • Damian May • Ox Nché • Rayno Nel • Kaden Prince • Burger van Niekerk • Conraad van Vuuren • Xander van Wyk
Backs	Dian Badenhorst • Darren Baron • Heinrich Bitzi • Carel-Jan Coetzee • JP Coetzee • TJ Goddard • Lorenzo Gordon • Julian Jordaan • Gerrie Labuschagné • Sechaba Matsoele • Ali Mgijima • Mosolwa Mafuma • Armand Pretorius • Niell Stannard • Arno van Staden • Did not play: • Carlton Coeries • Rewan Kruger • Johan Nel • Johannes Nel • Jayden Alrich Onkers • Vanian Pijoos • Tiaan Schmulian • Bjorn van Wyk • Dawid Andries Rinke Venter • Ruan Wasserman • Dwayne Wessels
Unknown	Did not play: • Stephen Patrick Botha • Nakkie Naudé

Golden Lions U21 squad
Forwards	Le Roux Baard • Driaan Bester • Jo-Hanko de Villiers • Estian Enslin • Marnus Erasmus • Rhyno Herbst • Wiehan Jacobs • Pieter Jansen • Kyle Kruger • Arnout Malherbe • Juandré Michau • Morné Moos • Mac Muller • FP Pelser • Dwayne Pienaar • Clinton Theron • Koos Tredoux • James Venter • Did not play: • Derik Bezuidenhout • Stephen Bhasera • CJ Conradie • Justin Meintjies • Henco Smit • Sarel Smith • Kenny van Niekerk
Backs	Ronald Brown • Kobus Engelbrecht • Johan Esterhuizen • Marco Jansen van Vuren • Curtis Jonas • Jaydrin Kotze • Siya Masuku • Godfrey Ramaboea • Shaun Reynolds • Cameron Rooi • Jarryd Sage • Barend Smit • Boeta Vermaak • Did not play: • Wynand Botha • Paul de Beer • Jurie Linde • Hendrik Mulder • Kwanele Ngema • Ralton Navan October • Gerdus van der Walt

Leopards U21 squad
Forwards	Tiaan Bezuidenhout • Daniel Jacobus Crafford • Petrus du Buson • Hendrik du Plessis • Louis Grey • Ruan Groenewald • Robert Hunt • Francois Jacobs • Mogau Mabokela • Muziwandile Mazibuko • Tshego Moloto • Bhekisa Shongwe • Wessel Steyn • Jaco Swanepoel • Louis van der Westhuizen • Dolf van Deventer • Joshua van Niekerk • Danie van Wyk • Did not play: • Bradley Leijdekkers • Gerhardus le Roux • Johnathan Levin • Kabelo Motloung • Henry Searle
Backs	Julian Delicado • Marco Donges • Sydney du Plessis • Eddie Engelbrecht • Wilbri Gunter • Garann Kriek • Wessel Kuhn • Tapiwa Mafura • Nkosana Mathaba • Nkululeko Mcuma • Jimmy Mpailane • Akhona Nela • Timothy Prince • Elden Schoeman • Did not play: • Lourens Basson • Rashard Fuller • Eugene Hare • Tokkie Kasselman • Allen Kemp Muller • Diederik Oberholzer • Roelof Liebenberg Scheepers • De Wet Terblanche
Unknown	Did not play: • Wian Koekemoer • Johannes Gerhardus Jacobus van Deventer • Daniel Jacobus von Wielligh

Sharks U21 squad
Forwards	Hyron Andrews • Ngoni Chidoma • Andrew du Plessis • Johan du Toit • Graham Geldenhuys • Kyle Hatherell • Erich Kankowski • Ruan Kramer • Mzamo Majola • Michael Meyer • Mthunzi Moloi • Bandisa Ndlovu • Johan Retief • Ayron Schramm • Pierre van der Walt • Kerron van Vuuren • Wian Vosloo • Rikus Zwart • Did not play: • Andrew Acton • Ryan Carlson • Reyno du Toit • Bernardus Haring • Michael Hutton • Jacobus Schalk Willem Kok • Retief Marais • Keagan Mills • Ruan Smook • Yuric Thambiran
Backs	Shane Ball • Tristan Blewett • Malcolm Cele • Marcel Coetzee • Ruben de Vos • Kelvin Elder • Jasper Genis • Benhard Janse van Rensburg • Morné Joubert • Jaywinn Juries • Marius Louw • Justin Newman • S'busiso Nkosi • Damian Stevens • Danrich Visagie • Did not play: • Matthew Alborough • Curwin Bosch • Tony Brandon Juan-Michel Botha • Bradley Phillip Ellse • Max Freydell • Rowan Gouws • Blake Mingay • Zweli Silaule • Alwayno Visagie

Western Province U21 squad
Forwards	Saud Abrahams • Jean-Pierre Botha • Rikus Bothma • Mitchell Carstens • Jaco Coetzee • Brenton Greaves • Michael Kumbirai • Daniël Maree • Percy Mngadi • Gary Porter • David Ribbans • Hanno Snyman • Luke Stringer • Nyasha Tarusenga • Ruben Terblanche • Christo van der Merwe • Frans van Wyk • Jacques Vermeulen • Kyle Whyte • Cobus Wiese • Jaco Willemse • Eduard Zandberg • Did not play: • Iver Aanhuizen • Ruan Brits • CF du Toit • JD Schickerling • Chad Solomon
Backs	Heinrich Buhr • Dennis Cox • Aidynn Cupido • Paul de Wet • Grant Hermanus • Herschel Jantjies • Eduan Keyter • Rabz Maxwane • Ryan Oosthuizen • Justin Phillips • Duncan Saal • Tiaan Swanepoel • Brandon Thomson • Edwill van der Merwe • EW Viljoen • Leolin Zas • Did not play: • Siya Alam • Michael Andrade • Clayton Daniels • Daniël du Plessis • Justin Heunis • Keenan Jacobs • Yaseen Jacobs • Kuziwa Kazembe • Khanyo Ngcukana • Wayne Smith • Ernst Stapelberg • Damian Stevens • Etienne Swarts • Fabian van der Vent
Unknown	Did not play: • Curtly Ambrose Thomas • Marlo Louis Weich
Coach	Jerome Paarwater

=== Points scorers ===
The following table contain points scored in the 2016 Under-21 Provincial Championship:

Top Ten point scorers
No	Player	Team	T	C	P	DG	Pts
1	Shaun Reynolds	Golden Lions U21	1	22	18	3	112
2	Grant Hermanus	Western Province U21	1	15	14	0	77
3	Garrick Mattheus	Eastern Province U21	1	15	11	0	68
4	Tinus de Beer	Blue Bulls U21	0	19	6	0	56
5	Gerrie Labuschagné	Free State U21	2	15	2	0	46
6	Heinrich Bitzi	Free State U21	0	8	6	0	34
7	Tristan Blewett	Sharks U21	6	0	0	0	30
7	Elden Schoeman	Leopards U21	6	0	0	0	30
9	Marco Donges	Leopards U21	0	8	3	1	28
10	Rabz Maxwane	Western Province U21	5	0	0	0	25
10	Jasper Wiese	Free State U21	5	0	0	0	25

Other point scorers
No	Player	Team	T	C	P	DG	Pts
12	Malcolm Jaer	Eastern Province U21	4	0	1	0	23
13	Morné Joubert	Sharks U21	4	0	0	0	20
13	Dewald Naudé	Blue Bulls U21	4	0	0	0	20
13	Franco Naudé	Blue Bulls U21	4	0	0	0	20
13	Christo van der Merwe	Western Province U21	4	0	0	0	20
13	James Venter	Golden Lions U21	4	0	0	0	20
18	Jaywinn Juries	Sharks U21	0	4	3	0	17
19	Kobus Engelbrecht	Golden Lions U21	2	0	2	0	16
20	Ronald Brown	Golden Lions U21	3	0	0	0	15
20	Carel-Jan Coetzee	Free State U21	3	0	0	0	15
20	Jaco Coetzee	Western Province U21	3	0	0	0	15
20	Mervano da Silva	Blue Bulls U21	3	0	0	0	15
20	Julian Delicado	Leopards U21	0	6	1	0	15
20	TJ Goddard	Free State U21	3	0	0	0	15
20	Marco Jansen van Vuren	Golden Lions U21	3	0	0	0	15
20	Siya Masuku	Golden Lions U21	1	2	2	0	15
20	Jixie Molapo	Eastern Province U21	3	0	0	0	15
20	Godfrey Ramaboea	Golden Lions U21	3	0	0	0	15
20	Wessel Steyn	Leopards U21	3	0	0	0	15
20	Ivan van Zyl	Blue Bulls U21	3	0	0	0	15
32	JT Jackson	Blue Bulls U21	2	2	0	0	14
33	Benhard Janse van Rensburg	Sharks U21	0	3	2	0	12
34	Aidynn Cupido	Western Province U21	1	3	0	0	11
35	Le Roux Baard	Golden Lions U21	2	0	0	0	10
35	Tiaan Bezuidenhout	Leopards U21	2	0	0	0	10
35	Malcolm Cele	Sharks U21	2	0	0	0	10
35	JP Coetzee	Free State U21	2	0	0	0	10
35	Marcel Coetzee	Sharks U21	2	0	0	0	10
35	Jo-Hanko de Villiers	Golden Lions U21	2	0	0	0	10
35	Ruben de Vos	Sharks U21	0	2	2	0	10
35	Nardus Erasmus	Free State U21	2	0	0	0	10
35	Wilbri Gunter	Leopards U21	2	0	0	0	10
35	Herschel Jantjies	Western Province U21	2	0	0	0	10
35	Somila Jho	Eastern Province U21	2	0	0	0	10
35	Eduan Keyter	Western Province U21	2	0	0	0	10
35	Adrian Maebane	Blue Bulls U21	2	0	0	0	10
35	Tapiwa Mafura	Leopards U21	2	0	0	0	10
35	Ryan Oosthuizen	Western Province U21	2	0	0	0	10
35	Fiffy Rampeta	Free State U21	2	0	0	0	10
35	Jarryd Sage	Golden Lions U21	2	0	0	0	10
35	Dolf van Deventer	Leopards U21	2	0	0	0	10
35	Ruben van Heerden	Blue Bulls U21	2	0	0	0	10
35	Alandré van Rooyen	Blue Bulls U21	2	0	0	0	10
35	Marco van Staden	Blue Bulls U21	2	0	0	0	10
35	Frans van Wyk	Western Province U21	2	0	0	0	10
35	Keanan van Wyk	Blue Bulls U21	2	0	0	0	10
35	Keanu Vers	Eastern Province U21	2	0	0	0	10
35	Jeremy Ward	Eastern Province U21	2	0	0	0	10
35	Jaco Willemse	Western Province U21	2	0	0	0	10
61	Brandon Thomson	Western Province U21	0	3	1	0	9
62	Damian Stevens	Sharks U21	0	1	2	0	8
63	Dian Badenhorst	Free State U21	1	0	0	0	5
63	Michael Brink	Eastern Province U21	1	0	0	0	5
63	Heinrich Buhr	Western Province U21	1	0	0	0	5
63	Mitchell Carstens	Western Province U21	1	0	0	0	5
63	Sydney du Plessis	Leopards U21	1	0	0	0	5
63	Graham Geldenhuys	Sharks U21	1	0	0	0	5
63	Lorenzo Gordon	Free State U21	1	0	0	0	5
63	Wiehan Jacobs	Golden Lions U21	1	0	0	0	5
63	JP Jamieson	Eastern Province U21	1	0	0	0	5
63	Günther Janse van Vuuren	Free State U21	1	0	0	0	5
63	Pieter Jansen	Golden Lions U21	1	0	0	0	5
63	Curtis Jonas	Golden Lions U21	1	0	0	0	5
63	Garann Kriek	Leopards U21	1	0	0	0	5
63	Kyle Kruger	Golden Lions U21	1	0	0	0	5
63	Manie Libbok	Blue Bulls U21	1	0	0	0	5
63	Mosolwa Mafuma	Free State U21	1	0	0	0	5
63	Michael Meyer	Sharks U21	1	0	0	0	5
63	Ali Mgijima	Free State U21	1	0	0	0	5
63	Jimmy Mpailane	Leopards U21	1	0	0	0	5
63	Percy Mngadi	Western Province U21	1	0	0	0	5
63	Mthunzi Moloi	Sharks U21	1	0	0	0	5
63	Morné Moos	Golden Lions U21	1	0	0	0	5
63	Bandisa Ndlovu	Sharks U21	1	0	0	0	5
63	Akhona Nela	Leopards U21	1	0	0	0	5
63	FP Pelser	Golden Lions U21	1	0	0	0	5
63	Justin Phillips	Western Province U21	1	0	0	0	5
63	Timothy Prince	Leopards U21	1	0	0	0	5
63	Jayson Reinecke	Eastern Province U21	1	0	0	0	5
63	David Ribbans	Western Province U21	1	0	0	0	5
63	Divan Rossouw	Blue Bulls U21	1	0	0	0	5
63	Duncan Saal	Western Province U21	1	0	0	0	5
63	Ayron Schramm	Sharks U21	1	0	0	0	5
63	Luke Stringer	Western Province U21	1	0	0	0	5
63	Clinton Theron	Golden Lions U21	1	0	0	0	5
63	Edwill van der Merwe	Western Province U21	1	0	0	0	5
63	Kerron van Vuuren	Sharks U21	1	0	0	0	5
63	Reinach Venter	Free State U21	1	0	0	0	5
63	Jacques Vermeulen	Western Province U21	1	0	0	0	5
63	Xandré Vos	Eastern Province U21	1	0	0	0	5
63	Eduard Zandberg	Western Province U21	1	0	0	0	5
63	Lindelwe Zungu	Eastern Province U21	1	0	0	0	5
104	Simon Bolze	Eastern Province U21	0	0	1	0	3
104	Dennis Cox	Western Province U21	0	0	1	0	3
106	Marius Louw	Sharks U21	0	1	0	0	2
—	penalty try	Free State U21	1	0	0	0	5
* Legend: T = Tries, C = Conversions, P = Penalties, DG = Drop Goals, Pts = Points.

=== Discipline ===
The following table contains all the cards handed out during the competition:

Red cards or multiple yellow cards
Player	Team	Sent off (straight red)	Temporarily suspended
Grant Hermanus	Western Province U21	1	0
Jo-Hanko de Villiers	Golden Lions U21	0	2

Single yellow cards
Player	Team	Sent off (straight red)	Temporarily suspended
Darren Baron	Free State U21	0	1
Matthys Basson	Blue Bulls U21	0	1
Tristan Blewett	Sharks U21	0	1
Jaco Coetzee	Western Province U21	0	1
JP Coetzee	Free State U21	0	1
Joseph Dweba	Free State U21	0	1
Njabulo Gumede	Blue Bulls U21	0	1
Rhyno Herbst	Golden Lions U21	0	1
Justin Hollis	Eastern Province U21	0	1
JP Jamieson	Eastern Province U21	0	1
Marius Louw	Sharks U21	0	1
Daniel Maartens	Free State U21	0	1
Tapiwa Mafura	Leopards U21	0	1
Theo Maree	Blue Bulls U21	0	1
Nkululeko Mcuma	Leopards U21	0	1
Ryan Oosthuizen	Western Province U21	0	1
Justin Phillips	Western Province U21	0	1
Timothy Prince	Leopards U21	0	1
Jarryd Sage	Golden Lions U21	0	1
Ruben Schoeman	Free State U21	0	1
Ayron Schramm	Sharks U21	0	1
Frans van Wyk	Western Province U21	0	1
Jeremy Ward	Eastern Province U21	0	1
* Legend: (red card) = Sent off, (yellow card) = Sin-binned

== Referees ==
The following referees officiated matches in the 2016 Under-21 Provincial Championship:

2016 Under-21 Provincial Championship referees
Referees	Ben Crouse • Stephan Geldenhuys • Quinton Immelman • AJ Jacobs • Jaco Kotze • Shuhei Kubo • Vusi Msibi • Sindile Ngcese • Jaco Peyper • Francois Pretorius • Jaco Pretorius • Egon Seconds • Archie Sehlako • Lourens van der Merwe

== See also ==
- Currie Cup
- 2016 Currie Cup Premier Division
- 2016 Currie Cup First Division
- 2016 Currie Cup qualification
- 2016 Under-20 Provincial Championship
- 2016 Under-19 Provincial Championship
