= 2014 Under-19 Provincial Championship =

The 2014 ABSA Under-19 Provincial Championship was a rugby union competition held between the Under-19 players from the fourteen provincial rugby unions in South Africa, plus the Limpopo Blue Bulls sub-union. It was contested from 11 July to 25 October 2014.

== Group A ==
=== Competition ===
There were seven participating teams in the 2014 Under-19 Provincial Championship Group A. These teams played each other twice over the course of the season, once at home and once away.

Teams received four points for a win and two points for a draw. Bonus points were awarded to teams that scored 4 or more tries in a game, as well as to teams that lost a match by 7 points or less. Teams were ranked by points, then points difference (points scored less points conceded).

The top 4 teams qualified for the title play-offs. In the semi-finals, the team that finished first had home advantage against the team that finished fourth, while the team that finished second had home advantage against the team that finished third. The winners of these semi-finals played each other in the final, at the same venue as the 2014 Currie Cup Premier Division Final.

The bottom team in Group A played a play-off game at home against the winner of the Group B final for a place in the 2015 Under-19 Provincial Championship Group A.

=== Teams ===
Location of teams in 2014 Under-19 Provincial Championship Group A

==== Team Listing ====
The following teams took part in the 2014 Under-19 Provincial Championship Group A competition:

2014 Under-19 Provincial Championship Group A teams
Team	Stadium/s
Blue Bulls U19	Loftus Versfeld, Pretoria
Eastern Province U19	Nelson Mandela Bay Stadium, Port Elizabeth
Free State U19	Free State Stadium, Bloemfontein
Golden Lions U19	Ellis Park Stadium, Johannesburg
Leopards U19	Olën Park, Potchefstroom
Sharks U19	Kings Park Stadium, Durban
Western Province U19	Newlands Stadium, Cape Town

=== Log ===
2014 Under-19 Provincial Championship Group A log
Pos	Team	Pld	W	D	L	PF	PA	PD	TF	TA	TB	LB	Pts	Qualification
1	Blue Bulls U19	12	9	0	3	387	282	+105	53	34	9	2	47	Semi-finals
2	Free State U19	12	8	0	4	310	204	+106	45	23	7	2	41	Semi-finals
3	Western Province U19	12	9	0	3	332	270	+62	38	36	5	0	41	Semi-finals
4	Sharks U19	12	6	0	6	287	256	+31	35	33	4	4	32	Semi-finals
5	Golden Lions U19	12	4	0	8	222	313	−91	28	44	3	3	22	
6	Eastern Province U19	12	4	0	8	227	253	−26	25	32	2	3	21	
7	Leopards U19	12	2	0	10	243	430	−187	38	60	5	2	15	Promotion/relegation play-offs

Rules for classification:
- 4 points for a win
- 2 points for a draw
- 1 bonus point for a loss by seven points or less
- 1 bonus point for scoring four or more tries in a match

=== Fixtures and results ===
- Fixtures are subject to change.
- All times are South African (GMT+2).

==== Round one ====
11 July 2014	Sharks U19	32–17	Leopards U19	Kings Park Stadium, Durban
13:00	Try: Ayron Schramm 31'; Jean-Luc du Preez 37'; Matthew Reece-Edwards 40', 58'; Con: Inny Radebe 31', 38', 40' (3/4); Pen: Inny Radebe 21', 27' (2/2)	Report; Scoreboard	Try: Gideon van der Merwe 7'; Wessel Kuhn 46'; Rudolph van Deventer 69'; Con: Chris Arries 46' (1/3); Cards: Jacques van Zyl (yellow card) 26' to 26'	Attendance: 100; Referee: Jaco Kotze

11 July 2014	Blue Bulls U19	29–17	Eastern Province U19	Loftus Versfeld, Pretoria
15:00	Try: Jurie Linde 3', 17'; Philip Orffer 5'; RG Snyman 61'; Con: Dewald Human 4', 5', 18' (3/4); Pen: Dewald Human 12' (1/1)	Report; Scoreboard	Try: Tyler Paul 19'; CJ Velleman 51'; Con: Jason Vers 20' (1/1); Kewan Gibb 52' (1/1); Pen: Jason Vers 25' (1/1); Cards: Jason Baggott (yellow card) 40' to 51'; Luan Nieuwoudt (yellow card) 60' to 69'	Referee: Oregopotse Rametsi

12 July 2014	Western Province U19	50–26	Free State U19	City Park Stadium, Athlone
13:30	Try: Daniël du Plessis 26'; Frans van Wyk 32', 63'; Leolin Zas 42'; Brendon Nell 69'; Con: Ernst Stapelberg 26', 32', 42', 63', 69' (5/5); Pen: Ernst Stapelberg 14', 19', 37', 47', 55' (5/6); Cards: Leolin Zas (yellow card) 8' to 18'	Report; Scoreboard	Try: Junior Burger 11'; Ox Nché 35'; Lorenzo Gordon 46', 70'; Con: André Swarts 11', 35' (2/3); Gerrie Labuschagné 70' (1/1); Pen: André Swarts (0/2); Cards: SJ Roux (yellow card) 51' to 61'; Willandré Kotzenberg (yellow card) 62'	Referee: Eduan Nel

Bye/s: Golden Lions U19

==== Round two ====
18 July 2014	Eastern Province U19	13–16	Golden Lions U19	Nelson Mandela Bay Stadium, Port Elizabeth
17:00	Try: Malcolm Jaer 42'; CJ Velleman 55'; Con: Jason Vers (0/1); Malcolm Jaer (0/1); Pen: Jason Vers 3' (1/2); Cards: Tyler Paul (yellow card) 7' to 17'	Report; Scoreboard	Try: Clinton Theron 63'; Con: Shaun Reynolds 63' (1/1); Pen: Xander Cronjé 8' (1/1); Shaun Reynolds 29', 36' (2/2)	Attendance: 290; Referee: Lusanda Jam

19 July 2014	Blue Bulls U19	33–18	Sharks U19	Loftus Versfeld, Pretoria
13:45	Try: Hanro Liebenberg 2'; Duhan van der Merwe 4'; Jurie Linde 18'; Jason Jenkins 41'; Con: Dewald Human 5', 42' (2/4); Pen: Dewald Human 11', 15', 38' (3/4)	Report; Scoreboard	Try: Jean-Luc du Preez 37'; Malcolm Cele 63'; Con: Inny Radebe 37' (1/1); Joshua Bragman (0/1); Pen: Inny Radebe 9', 13' (2/2)	Attendance: 500

19 July 2014	Western Province U19	39–12	Leopards U19	City Park Stadium, Athlone
13:30	Try: Jarryd Sage 4'; Leolin Zas 16', 56', 70'; Charlton Jonas 33'; Con: Ernst Stapelberg 4', 16', 56', 70' (4/5); Pen: Ernst Stapelberg 14', 36' (2/2)	Report; Scoreboard	Try: Rudolph van Deventer 30'; Mogau Mabokela 51'; Con: Sydney du Plessis 30' (1/2); Pen: Sydney du Plessis (0/1)	Attendance: 200

Bye/s: Free State U19

==== Round three ====
26 July 2014	Sharks U19	15–30	Western Province U19	Kings Park Stadium, Durban
11:00	Try: Nkululeko Mcuma 8'; Ayron Schramm 43'; Con: Inny Radebe 43' (1/2); Pen: Inny Radebe 23' (1/1); Cards: Marius Louw (yellow card) 7' to 17'	Report; Scoreboard	Try: Dewald Naudé 27'; Brendon Nell 40'; Johan Momsen 52'; Con: Ernst Stapelberg 27', 40', 52' (3/3); Pen: Ernst Stapelberg 4', 22', 59' (3/5)

26 July 2014	Free State U19	26–9	Eastern Province U19	Shimla Park, Bloemfontein
12:00	Try: Junior Burger 34', 55'; Stephen Rautenbach 60'; TJ Goddard 65'; Con: André Swarts 35' (1/1); Sechaba Matsoele 56' (1/1); Gerrie Labuschagné 66' (1/2); Pen: André Swarts (0/1); Cards: Jasper Wiese (yellow card) 19'	Report; Scoreboard	Pen: Jason Vers 21', 28' (2/2); Malcolm Jaer 54' (1/2)	Attendance: 100; Referee: Archie Sehlako

26 July 2014	Golden Lions U19	14–27	Leopards U19	Ellis Park Stadium, Johannesburg
13:00	Try: Shaun Reynolds 24'; Jade Solomons 39'; Con: Shaun Reynolds 25', 40' (2/2); Pen: Shaun Reynolds (0/1)	Report; Scoreboard	Try: Sydney du Plessis 9'; Jacques van Zyl 47'; Mogau Mabokela 56'; Elden Schoeman 67'; Con: Brendon Kahts 10', 48' (2/4); Pen: Brendon Kahts 61' (1/1)

Bye/s: Blue Bulls U19

==== Round four ====
1 August 2014	Blue Bulls U19	11–12	Free State U19	Loftus Versfeld, Pretoria
13:45	Try: Philip Orffer 33'; Con: Dewald Human (0/1); Pen: Dewald Human 1' (1/1); Simon Bolze 59' (1/1)	Report; Scoreboard	Try: Willandré Kotzenberg 17'; Lorenzo Gordon 51'; Con: André Swarts 18' (1/2); Pen: André Swarts (0/1)

1 August 2014	Sharks U19	24–27	Golden Lions U19	Woodburn Stadium, Pietermaritzburg
15:15	Try: Malcolm Cele 9'; Hyron Andrews 24'; Wesley White 52'; Inny Radebe 60'; Con: Inny Radebe 9', 24' (2/4); Pen: Inny Radebe (0/1)	Report; Scoreboard	Try: Clinton Theron 28'; Hamer Esterhuizen 41'; Dylan Vlok 49'; Con: Kobus Engelbrecht 28', 41' (2/2); Shaun Reynolds 49' (1/1); Pen: Kobus Engelbrecht 18', 38' (2/2); Ronald Brown (0/1)	Attendance: 100; Referee: Jaco Pretorius

2 August 2014	Leopards U19	26–32	Eastern Province U19	Olën Park, Potchefstroom
11:00	Try: Allen Muller 12'; Elden Schoeman 43', 55'; Brendon Kahts 66'; Con: Brendon Kahts 13', 44', 67' (3/4); Cards: Jacques van Zyl (yellow card) 27' to 38'	Report; Scoreboard	Try: CJ Velleman 16'; Malcolm Jaer 33', 69'; Wynand Grassmann 64'; Con: Malcolm Jaer 17', 34', 65' (3/4); Pen: Malcolm Jaer 24', 29' (2/2); Cards: Tembelihle Yase (yellow card) 27' to 38'	Attendance: 100

Bye/s: Western Province U19

==== Round Five ====
8 August 2014	Eastern Province U19	10–38	Western Province U19	Nelson Mandela Bay Stadium, Port Elizabeth
16:30	Try: CJ Velleman 59'; Con: Malcolm Jaer 60' (1/1); Pen: Malcolm Jaer 6' (1/2); Cameron Hertz (0/1)	Report; Scoreboard	Try: Heinrich Buhr 34'; Charlton Jonas 54'; Rikus Bothma 63'; Dewald Naudé 70'; Con: Ernst Stapelberg 35', 55' (2/2); Brandon Thomson 71' (1/2); Pen: Ernst Stapelberg 2', 20', 26', 38' (4/5)

9 August 2014	Leopards U19	18–26	Free State U19	Olën Park, Potchefstroom
11:00	Try: Walt Steenkamp 29'; Ray van der Lith 57', 70'; Con: Sydney du Plessis (0/1); Brendon Kahts (0/2); Pen: Brendon Kahts 48' (1/1); Cards: Daniel Crafford (yellow card) 42' to 52'	Report; Scoreboard	Try: TJ Goddard 2'; Johann Grundlingh 45'; Arno van Staden 51', 67'; Con: Gerrie Labuschagné 3' (1/1); André Swarts 52', 68' (2/3); Pen: Gerrie Labuschagné (0/2)	Attendance: 200; Referee: Lusanda Jam

9 August 2014	Golden Lions U19	11–36	Blue Bulls U19	Ellis Park Stadium, Johannesburg
12:45	Try: Gerdus van der Walt 56'; Pen: Kobus Engelbrecht 4', 20' (2/2); Cards: Derik Bezuidenhout (yellow card) 47' to 57'	Report; Scoreboard	Try: Hanro Liebenberg 9'; Dewald Human 17', 47'; Jixie Molapo 22', 52'; Con: Dewald Human 17', 22', 47', 52' (4/5); Pen: Dewald Human 34' (1/1); Simon Bolze (0/2)	Attendance: 1,000; Referee: Oregopotse Rametsi

Bye/s: Sharks U19

==== Round Six ====
15 August 2014	Sharks U19	9–7	Free State U19	Kings Park Stadium, Durban
15:00	Pen: Inny Radebe 17', 25', 33' (3/4)	Report; Scoreboard	Try: Günther Janse van Vuuren 7'; Con: Darren Baron 7' (1/1); Pen: André Swarts (0/2)	Attendance: 1,000; Referee: Cwengile Jadezweni

16 August 2014	Western Province U19	16–11	Blue Bulls U19	Newlands Stadium, Cape Town
09:45	Try: Daniël du Plessis 46'; Con: Ernst Stapelberg 47' (1/1); Pen: Ernst Stapelberg 3', 35', 55' (3/3); Cards: Dewald Naudé (yellow card) 17' to 27'; Grant Hermanus (yellow card) 71'	Report; Scoreboard	Try: Duhan van der Merwe 60'; Con: Simon Bolze (0/1); Pen: Dewald Human 16' (1/2); Simon Bolze 69' (1/1)	Referee: Lourens van der Merwe

16 August 2014	Golden Lions U19	7–18	Eastern Province U19	Ellis Park Stadium, Johannesburg
10:30	Try: Derik Bezuidenhout 7'; Con: Kobus Engelbrecht 8' (1/1)	Report; Scoreboard	Try: CJ Velleman 34'; Lindelwe Zungu 68'; Con: Malcolm Jaer 69' (1/2); Pen: Malcolm Jaer 9', 48' (2/3)	Attendance: 500; Referee: Archie Sehlako

Bye/s: Leopards U19

==== Round Seven ====
22 August 2014	Eastern Province U19	17–13	Free State U19	Central Grounds, Uitenhage
17:00	Try: Jeremy Ward 25'; Luan Nieuwoudt 40'; Con: Malcolm Jaer 26', 41' (2/2); Pen: Malcolm Jaer 69' (1/1)	Report; Scoreboard	Try: Ox Nché 34'; TJ Goddard 60'; Con: André Swarts (0/2); Pen: André Swarts 2' (1/1)	Attendance: 400; Referee: Oregopotse Rametsi

23 August 2014	Blue Bulls U19	52–27	Leopards U19	Loftus Versfeld, Pretoria
11:00	Try: Hanro Liebenberg 3'; Dimitrio Tieties 10', 38'; Duhan van der Merwe 21', 33'; Jurie Linde 24'; Calvonn Allison 43'; Burger van Niekerk 48'; Con: Dewald Human 4', 11', 22', 39', 44', 49' (6/8); Pen: Dewald Human (0/1)	Report; Scoreboard	Try: Elof Scheepers 12'; Ray van der Lith 35'; Elden Schoeman 51'; Mogau Mabokela 58'; Con: Julian Delicado 35', 52' (2/4); Pen: Julian Delicado 6' (1/1)	Attendance: 500; Referee: Lusanda Jam

23 August 2014	Western Province U19	24–22	Golden Lions U19	Newlands Stadium, Cape Town
12:45	Try: Adriaan Carelse 3'; Charlton Jonas 30'; Dewald Naudé 37'; Con: Ernst Stapelberg 4', 31', 38' (3/3); Pen: Ernst Stapelberg 21' (1/2)	Report; Scoreboard	Try: Marnus Erasmus 15'; Arnout Malherbe 53'; Jade Solomons 68'; Con: Kobus Engelbrecht (0/1); Jamie Campbell 54', 69' (2/2); Pen: Kobus Engelbrecht 14' (1/1); Cards: Marnus Erasmus (yellow card) 29' to 39'	Referee: Tahla Ntshakaza

Bye/s: Sharks U19

==== Round Eight ====
30 August 2014	Leopards U19	17–24	Sharks U19	Olën Park, Potchefstroom
11:00	Try: Farrel Kelly 31'; Timothy Prince 43', 48'; Con: Julian Delicado 44' (1/3); Cards: Akhona Nela (yellow card) 57'	Report; Scoreboard	Try: Adriaan de la Rey 5'; Jean-Luc du Preez 15'; Marius Louw 51'; Con: Inny Radebe 6', 16' (2/2); Joshua Bragman 52' (1/1); Pen: Inny Radebe 26' (1/1); Cards: Jean-Luc du Preez (yellow card) 18' to 29'; Merlyn Pieterse (yellow card) 57' to 67'	Attendance: 200; Referee: Daniel Fortuin

30 August 2014	Blue Bulls U19	44–29	Western Province U19	Loftus Versfeld, Pretoria
13:00	Try: Duhan van der Merwe 2'; Wyatt Murphy 6'; Hanro Liebenberg 20', 44'; Ivan van Zyl 25'; Jason Jenkins 58'; Xander van Wyk 66'; Con: Dewald Human 3', 59' (2/6); Kurt Webster 67' (1/1); Pen: Dewald Human 28' (1/2)	Report; Scoreboard	Try: Grant Hermanus 23', 50'; Kyle Whyte 68'; Damian Stevens 71'; Con: Brandon Thomson 51' (1/2); Ernst Stapelberg 68', 71' (2/2); Pen: Brandon Thomson 38' (1/2)	Referee: Eduan Nel

30 August 2014	Free State U19	34–0	Golden Lions U19	Old Greys Rugby Field, Bloemfontein
13:00	Try: Christiaan Roux 27'; Ox Nché 35'; Willandré Kotzenberg 40'; Lorenzo Gordon 44'; Jasper Wiese 62'; Con: André Swarts 28', 41', 63' (3/5); Pen: André Swarts 32' (1/1); Cards: Christiaan Erasmus (yellow card) 17' to 28'; Fiffy Rampeta (yellow card) 53'	Report; Scoreboard	Cards: Arné van Rensburg (yellow card) 34' to 45'	Referee: Stephan Geldenhuys

Bye/s: Eastern Province U19

==== Round Nine ====
5 September 2014	Eastern Province U19	7–15	Sharks U19	NMMU Stadium, Port Elizabeth
17:00	Try: Jeremy Ward 64'; Con: Garrick Mattheus 65' (1/1); Pen: Malcolm Jaer (0/2); Garrick Mattheus (0/1); Cards: David Murray (yellow card) 34' to 47'	Report; Scoreboard	Try: Marcel Coetzee 26'; Dan du Preez 51'; Con: Joshua Bragman 27' (1/2); Pen: Joshua Bragman 57' (1/1); Cards: Wian Vosloo (yellow card) 68'	Referee: Ricus van der Hoven

6 September 2014	Free State U19	54–15	Leopards U19	Free State Stadium, Bloemfontein
11:00	Try: Johann Grundlingh 2'; Jasper Wiese 8', 26', 37', 48'; Christiaan Erasmus 11'; Morné van Staden 40'; Fiffy Rampeta 70'; Con: André Swarts 3', 9', 13', 27', 38', 49', 70' (7/8); Cards: Junior Burger (yellow card) 19' to 29'; Fiffy Rampeta (yellow card) 52' to 63'	Report; Scoreboard	Try: Sydney du Plessis 62'; Marchell Hattingh 65'; Elof Scheepers 68'; Con: Sydney du Plessis (0/1); Marchell Hattingh (0/1); Elof Scheepers (0/1)	Referee: AJ Jacobs

6 September 2014	Blue Bulls U19	37–30	Golden Lions U19	Loftus Versfeld, Pretoria
15:00	Try: Hanro Liebenberg 5', 19', 41'; Jurie Linde 44'; Attie Louw 48'; Con: Simon Bolze 6', 20', 49' (3/5); Pen: Simon Bolze 25', 46' (2/2); Cards: Jan van der Merwe (yellow card) 28' to 40'	Report; Scoreboard	Try: Jade Solomons 23'; Johan Mitchell 31'; Dylan Vlok 33'; Godfrey Ramaboea 37'; Con: Shaun Reynolds 24', 38' (2/4); Pen: Shaun Reynolds 15', 47' (2/2); Cards: Marnus Erasmus (yellow card) 46' to 56'	Referee: Vusi Msibi

Bye/s: Western Province U19

==== Round Ten ====
12 September 2014	Eastern Province U19	42–7	Leopards U19	Nelson Mandela Bay Stadium, Port Elizabeth
16:30	Try: Malcolm Jaer 7', 53'; Lindelwe Zungu 11'; CJ Velleman 40'; JP Jamieson 66'; Con: Malcolm Jaer 12', 41', 67' (3/4); Garrick Mattheus 54' (1/1); Pen: Malcolm Jaer 20', 34', 52' (3/4); Cards: Jeremy Ward (yellow card) 10' to 21'; David Murray (yellow card) 43' to 54'; Tyler Paul (yellow card) 58' to 68'	Report; Scoreboard	Try: Gideon van der Merwe 5'; Con: Stefan Coetzer 6' (1/1); Pen: Stefan Coetzer (0/1); Cards: Jacques van Zyl (yellow card) 51' to 61'; Lourens Jacobus Abraham Basson (yellow card) 58' to 68'	Referee: Vusi Msibi

13 September 2014	Free State U19	22–18	Sharks U19	Free State Stadium, Bloemfontein
11:00	Try: André Swarts 29'; Nardus Erasmus 38'; Lorenzo Gordon 60'; Con: André Swarts 30', 39' (2/3); Pen: André Swarts 16' (1/2); Drop: André Swarts (0/1)	Report; Scoreboard	Try: Johan Willem du Toit 21'; Dan du Preez 32'; Con: Joshua Bragman 33' (1/2); Pen: Joshua Bragman 8', 11' (2/2)	Attendance: 500; Referee: Renier Vermeulen

13 September 2014	Golden Lions U19	28–8	Western Province U19	Ellis Park Stadium, Johannesburg
12:45	Try: Godfrey Ramaboea 20'; Derik Bezuidenhout 44'; Ruan Ackermann 62'; Con: Shaun Reynolds 45', 63' (2/3); Pen: Shaun Reynolds 5', 23', 48' (3/3); Cards: Derik Bezuidenhout (yellow card) 69'	Report; Scoreboard	Try: Charlton Jonas 52'; Con: Ernst Stapelberg (0/1); Pen: Ernst Stapelberg 41' (1/1)	Referee: Lusanda Jam

Bye/s: Blue Bulls U19

==== Round Eleven ====
19 September 2014	Golden Lions U19	41–36	Sharks U19	Ellis Park Stadium, Johannesburg
15:00	Try: Shaun Reynolds 6', 34'; Jade Solomons 28'; Ronald Brown 60'; Pieter Labuschagne 63'; Xander Cronjé 65'; Con: Shaun Reynolds 6', 34', 61', 63' (4/6); Pen: Shaun Reynolds 10' (1/1)	Report; Scoreboard	Try: Hyron Andrews 2'; Inny Radebe 30', 68'; Jean-Luc du Preez 40', 46'; Con: Inny Radebe 30', 40', 46', 68' (4/5); Pen: Inny Radebe 9' (1/2); Drop: Inny Radebe (0/1)	Referee: Tahla Ntshakaza

20 September 2014	Western Province U19	21–20	Eastern Province U19	City Park Stadium, Athlone
10:45	Try: David Ribbans 46'; Justin Phillips 65'; Con: Ernst Stapelberg 47' (1/2); Pen: Ernst Stapelberg 9', 50', 69' (3/3); Cards: Grant Hermanus (yellow card) 68'	Report; Scoreboard	Try: Malcolm Jaer 30'; Arno Lotter 61'; Con: Kewan Gibb 31' (1/1); Jason Baggott 62' (1/1); Pen: Malcolm Jaer 2', 68' (2/6); Drop: Jason Baggott (0/1)	Referee: Renier Vermeulen

20 September 2014	Leopards U19	24–46	Blue Bulls U19	Olën Park, Potchefstroom
11:00	Try: Wessel Steyn 17'; Akhona Nela 32'; Eugene Hare 64'; Con: Sydney du Plessis 18', 33', 65' (3/3); Pen: Sydney du Plessis 4' (1/1)	Report; Scoreboard	Try: Duhan van der Merwe 2', 6', 39'; Attie Louw 13'; Simon Bolze 29'; Stefaan Grundlingh 36'; Peet Schoeman 41'; Con: Simon Bolze 7', 14', 30', 37' (4/7); Pen: Simon Bolze 21' (1/1)	Referee: Jaco Kotze

Bye/s: Free State U19

==== Round Twelve ====
26 September 2014	Free State U19	25–50	Blue Bulls U19	Free State Stadium, Bloemfontein
15:00	Try: Jasper Wiese 17'; Nardus Erasmus 25'; Carl Durow 61'; Con: André Swarts 26', 62' (2/3); Pen: André Swarts 10', 34' (2/2)	Report; Scoreboard	Try: Jixie Molapo 6', 65'; RG Snyman 46'; Tinus de Beer 49'; Adrian Maebane 57'; Francois Steyn 63'; Con: Dewald Human 7', 47' (2/4); Simon Bolze 64', 66' (2/2); Pen: Dewald Human 2', 13', 22', 35' (4/4); Drop: Dewald Human (0/1)	Attendance: 200; Referee: AJ Jacobs

27 September 2014	Sharks U19	24–21	Eastern Province U19	Kings Park Stadium, Durban
09:30	Try: Jean-Luc du Preez 11'; Sphamandla Ngcobo 43'; Inny Radebe 58'; Con: Inny Radebe 12', 44', 59' (3/3); Pen: Inny Radebe 68' (1/2); Cards: Marius Louw (yellow card) 17'	Report; Scoreboard	Try: Tyler Paul 54'; Lindelwe Zungu 60'; Con: Malcolm Jaer 55' (1/2); Pen: Garrick Mattheus 2' (1/3); Malcolm Jaer 36', 67' (2/2)	Attendance: 100; Referee: Gerrie de Bruin

27 September 2014	Leopards U19	24–43	Western Province U19	Olën Park, Potchefstroom
11:00	Try: Gerrie le Roux; Thando Magalakangqa; Gideon van der Merwe; Rudi Pieters; Con: Sydney du Plessis	Report; Scoreboard	Try: Adriaan Carelse; Justin Phillips; Regardt Louw; Heinrich Buhr; Con: Ernst Stapelberg; Pen: Ernst Stapelberg; Cards: Justin Phillips (yellow card) 12' to 22'	Attendance: 250; Referee: Ricus van der Hoven

Bye/s: Golden Lions U19

==== Round Thirteen ====
3 October 2014	Leopards U19	29–26	Golden Lions U19	Olën Park, Potchefstroom
12:45	Try: Gerhard Steenekamp 7'; Rudi Pieters 24'; Akhona Nela 34'; Elof Scheepers 57'; Con: Sydney du Plessis 8', 25', 35' (3/4); Pen: Sydney du Plessis 17' (1/1); Cards: Gideon van der Merwe (yellow card) 60'	Report; Scoreboard	Try: Shaun Reynolds 36'; Marco Holmes 61'; Godfrey Ramaboea 62'; Gerdus van der Walt 67'; Con: Shaun Reynolds 61', 63', 67' (3/4); Cards: Roelof Diedericks (yellow card) 43' to 53'; Godfrey Ramaboea (yellow card) 48' to 58'	Attendance: 100; Referee: Tahla Ntshakaza

3 October 2014	Sharks U19	52–7	Blue Bulls U19	Kings Park Stadium, Durban
15:00	Try: Marcel Coetzee 13', 21', 67'; Marius Louw 15'; Johan du Toit 34'; Jean-Luc du Preez 41'; Andrew du Plessis 57'; Con: Inny Radebe 16', 22', 57', 68' (4/7); Pen: Inny Radebe 5', 9' (2/3); Drop: Inny Radebe 64' (1/1)	Report; Scoreboard	Try: Ivan van Zyl 17'; Con: Dewald Human 18' (1/1); Cards: Matthys Basson (yellow card) 56' to 66'; Johan van Wyk (yellow card) 60'; Abongile Nonkontwana (yellow card) 60'	Referee: Ricus van der Hoven

4 October 2014	Free State U19	38–7	Western Province U19	Free State Stadium, Bloemfontein
10:00	Try: Reinach Venter 15', 47'; Jasper Wiese 22'; Willandré Kotzenberg 43'; Lorenzo Gordon 61'; Con: André Swarts 16', 23', 44', 48', 62' (5/5); Pen: André Swarts 1' (1/1); Cards: Johann Grundlingh (yellow card) 69'	Report; Scoreboard	Try: Leolin Zas 54'; Con: Ernst Stapelberg 55' (1/1)	Attendance: 200; Referee: Vusi Msibi

Bye/s: Eastern Province U19

==== Round Fourteen ====
10 October 2014	Eastern Province U19	21–31	Blue Bulls U19	Nelson Mandela Bay Stadium, Port Elizabeth
16:30	Try: Malcolm Jaer 54', 30'; Con: Garrick Mattheus 31' (1/2); Pen: Garrick Mattheus 11', 20', 27' (3/3); Cards: Elandré van der Merwe (yellow card) 42'	Report; Scoreboard	Try: Jurie Linde 62', 28', 51'; Abongile Nonkontwana 23'; Con: Simon Bolze 52', 24', 29' (3/3); Kurt Webster 63' (1/1); Pen: Simon Bolze 33' (1/1)	Attendance: 150; Referee: Tahla Ntshakaza

11 October 2014	Western Province U19	27–20	Sharks U19	Newlands Stadium, Cape Town
12:45	Try: Ryan Oosthuizen 20'; Ernst Stapelberg 25'; Heinrich Buhr 58'; Con: Ernst Stapelberg 21', 26' (2/2); Brandon Thomson 59' (1/1); Pen: Ernst Stapelberg 13', 46' (2/2)	Report; Scoreboard	Try: Sphamandla Ngcobo 34'; Matthew Reece-Edwards 39'; Con: Inny Radebe 35', 40' (2/2); Pen: Inny Radebe 4', 54' (2/3)	Referee: Jaco Pretorius

11 October 2014	Golden Lions U19	0–27	Free State U19	Ellis Park Stadium, Johannesburg
11:00	Cards: Jamie Campbell (yellow card) 54' to 64'; Kerron van Vuuren (yellow card) 58' to 68'	Report; Scoreboard	Try: Christiaan Erasmus 20'; Jasper Wiese 57'; TJ Goddard 59'; Reinach Venter 69'; Con: André Swarts 59', 69' (2/4); Pen: André Swarts 29' (1/1)	Referee: Oregopotse Rametsi

Bye/s: Leopards U19

==== Semi-finals ====
17 October 2014	Blue Bulls U19	43–20	Sharks U19	Loftus Versfeld, Pretoria
13:00	Try: Jurie Linde 15', 26'; Dewald Human 33'; Menzi Nhlabathi 47'; Jixie Molapo 65'; Wyatt Murphy 69'; Con: Dewald Human 16', 27', 34', 48', 70' (5/6); Pen: Dewald Human 4' (1/2)	Report; Scoreboard	Try: Johan du Toit 18'; Sphamandla Ngcobo 44'; Con: Inny Radebe 18', 45' (2/2); Pen: Inny Radebe 6', 35' (2/3); Drop: Inny Radebe (0/1)	Referee: Jaco Pretorius

18 October 2014	Free State U19	22–29	Western Province U19	Free State Stadium, Bloemfontein
11:00	Try: Jasper Wiese 42'; Hendri Storm 60'; Reinach Venter 64'; Con: André Swarts 43', 65' (2/3); Pen: André Swarts 47' (1/4); Cards: Arno van Staden (yellow card) 23' to 33'	Report; Scoreboard	Try: Justin Phillips 26'; Leolin Zas 53'; Con: Ernst Stapelberg 27', 53' (2/2); Pen: Ernst Stapelberg 2', 20', 36', 63', 66' (5/6); Cards: Paul-Martin Wipplinger (yellow card) 59'	Attendance: 1,000; Referee: Stephan Geldenhuys

==== Final ====
25 October 2014	Western Province U19	33–26	Blue Bulls U19	Newlands Stadium, Cape Town
12:15	Try: Khanyo Ngcukana 18'; Francois van der Merwe 37'; Christo van der Merwe 66'; Con: Ernst Stapelberg 19', 38', 67' (3/3); Pen: Ernst Stapelberg 3', 6', 31', 65' (4/7)	Scoreboard	Try: Abongile Nonkontwana 7'; Warrick Gelant 21'; Menzi Nhlabathi 52'; Dewald Human 60'; Con: Dewald Human 8', 53', 61' (3/4); Drop: Dewald Human (0/1)	Referee: Rodney Boneparte

=== Honours ===
2014 Under-19 Provincial Championship
Group A Champions
Western Province U19

== Group B ==
=== Competition ===
There were eight participating teams in the 2014 Under-19 Provincial Championship Group B. These teams played each other once over the course of the season, either at home or away.

Teams received four points for a win and two points for a draw. Bonus points were awarded to teams that scored 4 or more tries in a game, as well as to teams that lost a match by 7 points or less. Teams were ranked by points, then points difference (points scored less points conceded).

The top 4 teams qualified for the title play-offs. In the semi-finals, the team that finished first had home advantage against the team that finished fourth, while the team that finished second had home advantage against the team that finished third. The winners of these semi-finals played each other in the final, at the same venue as the 2014 Currie Cup First Division Final.

The winner of the final played a play-off game away from home against the bottom team in Group A for a place in the 2015 Under-19 Provincial Championship Group A.

=== Teams ===
Location of teams in 2014 Under-19 Provincial Championship Group B

==== Team Listing ====
The following teams took part in the 2014 Under-19 Provincial Championship Group B competition:

2014 Under-19 Provincial Championship Group B teams
Team	Stadium/s
Boland U19	Boland Stadium, Wellington
Border U19	Buffalo City Stadium, East London
Falcons U19	Barnard Stadium, Kempton Park
Griquas U19	Griqua Park, Kimberley
Griffons U19	North West Stadium, Welkom
Limpopo Blue Bulls U19	Peter Mokaba Stadium, Polokwane
Pumas U19	Mbombela Stadium, Mbombela
SWD U19	Outeniqua Park, George

=== Log ===
2014 Under-19 Provincial Championship Group B log
Pos	Team	Pld	W	D	L	PF	PA	PD	TF	TA	TB	LB	Pts	Qualification
1	Falcons U19	7	7	0	0	246	118	+128	28	14	5	0	33	Semi-finals
2	Boland U19 (C)	7	6	0	1	244	128	+116	33	12	4	0	28	Semi-finals
3	Limpopo Blue Bulls U19	7	5	0	2	228	181	+47	33	24	4	1	25	Semi-finals
4	Pumas U19	7	4	0	3	220	252	−32	32	38	5	0	21	Semi-finals
5	Griffons U19	7	3	0	4	217	228	−11	26	34	3	2	17	
6	SWD U19	7	2	0	5	179	154	+25	25	18	2	2	12	
7	Griquas U19	7	1	0	6	146	160	−14	22	21	1	3	8	
8	Border U19	7	0	0	7	103	362	−259	17	55	2	0	2	

Rules for classification: The play-off final winner will qualify to the promotion/relegation play-offs.
- 4 points for a win
- 2 points for a draw
- 1 bonus point for a loss by seven points or less
- 1 bonus point for scoring four or more tries in a match
(C) Champion

=== Fixtures and results ===
- Fixtures are subject to change.
- All times are South African (GMT+2).

==== Round one ====
9 August 2014	Falcons U19	45–7	Border U19	Barnard Stadium, Kempton Park
13:30	Try: Jacqone de Villiers 16'; Arno Kotzé 29', 58'; Dudley Thompson 32'; Zane Wessels 48'; Gideon Roux 65'; Con: Arno Kotzé 30', 33', 66' (3/6); Pen: Arno Kotzé 2', 8', 22' (3/4); Cards: Johan Swart (yellow card) 46' to 57'	Report; Scoreboard	Try: Aphiwe Stemele 24'; Con: Aya Mavuso 25' (1/1); Pen: Carvin van Eck (0/3); Cards: Sivenathi Kweya (yellow card) 32' to 44'	Referee: Steven van Zyl

9 August 2014	Griffons U19	21–17	Griquas U19	North West Stadium, Welkom
17:00	Try: Jaywinn Juries 11'; Luan James 13'; Nathan Kemp 15'; Con: Jaywinn Juries 12', 14', 15' (3/3); Pen: Luan James (0/1); Cards: Fanie Vermaak (yellow card) 39' to 49'; Jonathan April (yellow card) 44' to 54'	Report; Scoreboard	Try: Johannes Benade 18'; Jacques van Rooyen 44'; Con: William Tucker 18' (1/1); Aswad Reid 44' (1/1); Pen: Johannes Benade 1' (1/1)

9 August 2014	Pumas U19	40–27	SWD U19	Mbombela Stadium, Mbombela
tbc	Try: Ruan du Plooy 1'; Dylan Pieterse 39', 43'; Mzwakhe Fransman 68'; Con: Dylan du Buisson 2', 39', 44', 69' (4/4); Pen: Dylan du Buisson 9', 12', 51', 60' (4/4); Cards: Dewald Pretorius (yellow card) 20' to 29'	Report; Scoreboard (Note: The Pumas U19 v SWD U19 was initially listed on the results page, but later disappeared. The match report still exists, but without team and scoreline information.)	Try: Lohan Potgieter 3' penalty try 19'; Charles Radebe 34', 57'; Con: Helin Petersen 19', 58' (2/4); Pen: Helin Petersen 30' (1/1)

Bye/s: Boland U19, Limpopo Blue Bulls U19

==== Round two ====
15 August 2014	Boland U19	26–10	Griquas U19	Boland Stadium, Wellington
14:00	Try: Warren Williams 37', 58'; JC Genade 69'; Con: Lohan Lubbe 38' (1/3); Pen: Lohan Lubbe 5', 11', 34' (3/3); Cards: Nazeem de Sousa (yellow card) 29' to 39'	Report; Scoreboard	Try: Nico Graaf 51'; Con: William Tucker 52' (1/1); Pen: William Tucker 9' (1/2)	Attendance: 200; Referee: Jaco Pretorius

16 August 2014	Limpopo Blue Bulls U19	11–10	SWD U19	Peter Mokaba Stadium, Polokwane
13:00	Try: Ryan West 55'; Con: Lourens Pretorius (0/1); Pen: Ryan West 44' (1/1); Luvo Claassen 62' (1/1); Cards: Casper le Roux (yellow card) 70'	Report; Scoreboard	Try: Shadward Fillies 46'; Con: Johan Steyn 47' (1/1); Pen: Johan Steyn 16' (1/1)	Attendance: 50; Referee: Pieter Maritz

16 August 2014	Pumas U19	15–46	Falcons U19	Puma Stadium, Witbank
13:30	Try: Mzwakhe Fransman 23', 35'; Con: Dylan du Buisson 35' (1/2); Pen: Dylan du Buisson 29' (1/2); Cards: Jurie Vermeulen (yellow card) 12' to 22'	Report; Scoreboard	Try: Philip Terblanché 10'; Arno Kotzé 15', 58', 66'; Ruan Neethling 36'; Jacqone de Villiers 44'; Con: Arno Kotzé 10', 44', 58', 66' (4/5); Jacqone de Villiers 36' (1/1); Pen: Arno Kotzé 26', 49' (2/2); Cards: Rholane Ngubuka (yellow card) 46'; Zane Wessels (red card) 62'	Referee: Eduan Nel

16 August 2014	Griffons U19	47–38	Border U19	North West Stadium, Welkom
16:00	Try: Carlton Coeries 6'; Ezrick Alexander 11'; Johan Esterhuizen 18'; Nathan Kemp 30'; Gerrit Otto 47'; Luan James 51'; Con: Jaywinn Juries 7' (1/3); Shaquille Adams 31', 48', 52' (3/3); Pen: Luan James 3' (1/1); Nathan Kemp (0/1); Shaquille Adams 45' (1/2); Drop: Luan James 21' (1/1)	Report; Scoreboard	Try: Asithandile Ben 22'; Aphiwe Stemele 25'; Bonginkosi Ngqushwa 40'; Siyanda Roqo 66'; Keeran Bantom 68'; Nanele Tyali 69'; Con: Aphiwe Stemele 23', 26', 41', 68' (4/4); Aya Mavuso (0/1); Nanele Tyali (0/1); Pen: Aya Mavuso (0/1); Aphiwe Stemele (0/1); Cards: Johan Crous (yellow card) 56' to 66'	Attendance: 200; Referee: Gerrie de Bruin

==== Round three ====
22 August 2014	Border U19	7–53	Boland U19	Buffalo City Stadium, East London
15:00	Try: Sinethemba Mngaza 17'; Con: Aphiwe Stemele 18' (1/1); Pen: Aphiwe Stemele (0/1); Sivenathi Kweya (0/1); Cards: Mandilakhe Wontoti (yellow card) 65'	Report; Scoreboard	Try: Warren Williams 1', 33', 41', 67'; Killian von Mollendorff 14'; Mishaun Arendse 31', 63'; Brand Taljaard 61'; Con: Lohan Lubbe 2', 15', 34', 62', 64' (5/8); Pen: Lohan Lubbe 29' (1/1)	Attendance: 150; Referee: Jaco Kotze

22 August 2014	SWD U19	17–32	Griffons U19	Outeniqua Park, George
15:15	Try: Jurgen Olivier 8'; Charles Radebe 43'; Lohan Potgieter 70'; Con: Helin Petersen (0/1); Johan Steyn 44' (1/2); Cards: Brandon Haas (yellow card) 59' to 69'	Report; Scoreboard	Try: Justin Williams 23'; Jaywinn Juries 32', 65'; Jonathan April 53'; Con: Jaywinn Juries 24', 33', 66' (3/3); Jonathan April (0/1); Pen: Jaywinn Juries 39', 62' (2/3)	Attendance: 122; Referee: Archie Sehlako

23 August 2014	Falcons U19	35–28	Limpopo Blue Bulls U19	Barnard Stadium, Kempton Park
13:30	Try: Boela Croukamp 1'; Johan Swart 3'; Gideon Roux 22'; Jacqone de Villiers 59'; Con: Arno Kotzé 2', 23', 60' (3/4); Pen: Arno Kotzé 45', 49', 66' (3/3)	Report; Scoreboard	Try: Marco van Staden 8'; Jeuan-Re Swanepoel 28'; Marcel Human 70'; Con: Luvo Claassen 9', 29' (2/3); Pen: Andries Hefer (0/1); Luvo Claassen 12', 32', 38' (3/3)	Referee: Eduan Nel

Bye/s: Griquas U19, Pumas U19

==== Round four ====
29 August 2014	Border U19	17–39	Limpopo Blue Bulls U19	Buffalo City Stadium, East London
16:00	Try: Anele Zweni 2'; Brandon Meyer 10'; Marcello Kleinhans 37'; Con: Sivenathi Kweya 11' (1/3); Pen: Sivenathi Kweya (0/3); Cards: Siyanda Roqo (yellow card) 51' to 61'; Sivuyisiwe Gcilitshana (yellow card) 60'	Report; Scoreboard	Try: Christopher Labuschagne 5'; Matthew-Hank Swanepoel 26', 40'; Ryan West 34'; Casper le Roux 52'; Lourens Pretorius 68'; Con: Andries Hefer 35' (1/4); Luvo Claassen 53', 69' (2/2); Pen: Luvo Claassen 60' (1/2)	Attendance: 100; Referee: Rodney Boneparte

30 August 2014	Griquas U19	17–18	Falcons U19	Griqua Park, Kimberley
10:30	Try: Aswad Reid 25'; Nico Graaf 31'; Con: William Tucker 25', 31' (2/2); Pen: William Tucker (0/1); Clinton Toua 18' (1/2); Cards: Clinton Toua (yellow card) 44' to 54'	Report; Scoreboard	Try: Zane Wessels 45'; Casper Aucamp 48'; Con: Arno Kotzé 49' (1/2); Pen: Arno Kotzé 6', 66' (2/3); Cards: Jacqone de Villiers (yellow card) 1' to 11'; Gideon Roux (yellow card) 23' to 33'; Nicolaas van Tonder (yellow card) 30' to 40'	Attendance: 50; Referee: Pieter Maritz

30 August 2014	Boland U19	50–15	Pumas U19	Boland Stadium, Wellington
12:15	Try: Mishaun Arendse 2', 16', 61'; JC Genade 31'; Warren Williams 34', 41'; Killian von Mollendorff 50'; Esteban van der Merwe 56'; Con: Lohan Lubbe 17', 32', 35', 51', 57' (5/8)	Report; Scoreboard	Try: Chris van Leeuwen 13'; Louw de Waal 59'; Con: Dylan du Buisson 60' (1/2); Pen: Dylan du Buisson 11' (1/1)	Attendance: 340; Referee: Fernando Uithaler

Bye/s: Griffons U19, SWD U19

==== Round Five ====
6 September 2014	Griffons U19	33–36	Boland U19	North West Stadium, Welkom
11:45	Try: Gerrit Otto 9'; Nazo Nkala 36'; Luan James 70'; Con: Jaywinn Juries 10', 37', 71' (3/3); Pen: Jaywinn Juries 4', 6', 15', 35' (4/5)	Report; Scoreboard	Try: Warren Williams 11', 66'; Killian von Mollendorff 38'; Gareth Cilliers 41'; Gerdwill le Fleur 49'; Con: Lohan Lubbe 39', 42', 50', 67' (4/5); Pen: Lohan Lubbe (0/1); Drop: Lohan Lubbe 55' (1/1)	Referee: Jan Venter

6 September 2014	Falcons U19	39–22	SWD U19	Barnard Stadium, Kempton Park
12:00	Try: Dudley Thompson 11', 32'; Gideon Roux 30'; Boela Croukamp 43'; Ryan Solomons 57'; Con: Arno Kotzé 12', 33', 44', 58' (4/4); Boela Croukamp (0/1); Pen: Dudley Thompson (0/1); Arno Kotzé 16', 60' (2/2); Cards: Jacqone de Villiers (yellow card) 61'	Report; Scoreboard	Try: Lenes Nomdo 24'; Jason Mesuur 34'; Lohan Potgieter 49'; Con: Nathan Scott 25' (1/1); Johan Steyn 35' (1/1); Shadward Fillies (0/1); Pen: Johan Steyn 9' (1/2); Cards: Lenes Nomdo (yellow card) 40' to 50'	Referee: Wilko Esterhuizen

6 September 2014	Limpopo Blue Bulls U19	43–17	Griquas U19	Piet Potgieter HS, Potgietersrus
13:00	Try: Jerome Rank 5'; Charl Sander 21'; Ryan West 38'; Matthew-Hank Swanepoel 42', 48'; Favian Wilken 46'; Brendan Vorster 63'; Con: Luvo Claassen (0/2); Charl Sander 39', 43', 47', 49' (4/5); Pen: Luvo Claassen (0/1); Cards: Christopher Labuschagne (yellow card) 34'	Report; Scoreboard	Try: Wiaan Cornelesen 25'; Siya Lawu 29'; Aubrené Tities 70'; Con: William Tucker 26' (1/3); Pen: William Tucker (0/2); Cards: Dylan Walsh (yellow card) 41' to 51'	Referee: Paul Mente

6 September 2014	Border U19	29–60	Pumas U19	Buffalo City Stadium, East London
14:15	Try: Aphiwe Stemele 5'; Sivenathi Kweya 38'; Phillipus Korff 47'; Marco van Dijk 54'; Jason Bantom 68'; Con: Aphiwe Stemele 6' (1/1); Sivenathi Kweya 39' (1/4); Cards: Anele Zweni (yellow card) 32' to 39'	Report; Scoreboard	Try: Dylan Pieterse 11', 23', 33'; Lewies van Deventer 18'; Abednigo Mashabane 30'; Jaco Joubert 31', 63'; Dewald Pretorius 35'; Dylan du Buisson 45'; Con: Dylan du Buisson 12', 19', 32', 34', 35', 46' (6/8); Lewies van Deventer (0/1); Pen: Dylan du Buisson 1' (1/1); Cards: Dylan Pieterse (yellow card) 68'	Referee: Ruaan du Preez

==== Round Six ====
12 September 2014	SWD U19	60–5	Border U19	Outeniqua Park, George
15:15	Try: Shadward Fillies 1', 32'; Lohan Potgieter 18'; JP du Plessis 28'; Domenic Smit 42', 67'; Brandon Haas 46'; Deveron Lindoor 53'; Helin Petersen 57'; Charles Radebe 63'; Con: Nathan Scott 2' (1/4); Shadward Fillies 43' (1/2); Helin Petersen 54', 58', 67' (3/4)	Report; Scoreboard	Try: Johan Buitendag 61'; Con: Aphiwe Stemele (0/1)	Attendance: 250; Referee: Fernando Uithaler

13 September 2014	Griquas U19	17–22	Pumas U19	Griqua Park, Kimberley
10:30	Try: Wiaan Cornelesen 18'; JP Abrahams 65'; Con: Aswad Reid 19' (1/1); William Tucker 66' (1/1); Pen: William Tucker 56' (1/1); Cards: Siya Lawu (red card) 15'; Pieter Botha (yellow card) 69'	Report; Scoreboard	Try: Abednigo Mashabane 21'; Willem Ludike 32', 69'; Chris van Leeuwen 63'; Con: Dylan du Buisson 21' (1/2); Jacques Bruce (0/1); Lewies van Deventer (0/1); Cards: Lewies van Deventer (yellow card) 55' to 65'	Referee: Sindile Ngcese

13 September 2014	Boland U19	13–25	Falcons U19	Boland Stadium, Wellington
12:15	Try: Cheslyn Korasie 16'; Lohan Lubbe 28'; Con: Lohan Lubbe (0/2); Pen: Lohan Lubbe 47' (1/1)	Report; Scoreboard	Try: Zane Wessels 42'; Con: Arno Kotzé 43' (1/1); Pen: Arno Kotzé 3', 25', 35', 39', 50', 60' (6/6); Cards: Philip Terblanche (yellow card) 19' to 29'	Referee: Derek Summer

13 September 2014	Limpopo Blue Bulls U19	39–28	Griffons U19	Peter Mokaba Stadium, Polokwane
13:00	Try: Favian Wilken 5'; Christopher Labuschagne 15'; Lourens Pretorius 23'; Ryan West 31'; Ryan Robinson 45'; Diederick Steyn 70'; Con: Charl Sander 6', 16', 32' (3/6); Pen: Charl Sander 21' (1/1)	Report; Scoreboard	Try: Gregan Hull 17'; Jaco Conradie 39'; Nazo Nkala 63'; Con: Jaywinn Juries 40', 64' (2/3); Pen: Luan James 26' (1/1); Jaywinn Juries 37', 50' (2/2)	Referee: Ruaan du Preez

==== Round Seven ====
19 September 2014	Border U19	0–58	Griquas U19	Buffalo City Stadium, East London
15:00		Report; Scoreboard	Try: Rayno Nel 4', 70'; Clinton Toua 14'; Jacques van Rooyen 19'; Siya Lawu 25'; Joel Murphy 28'; Luaan Dowie 35'; Johan Obbes 41'; Nico Graaf 52'; Qhama Hina 65'; Con: Clinton Toua 15', 42', 53' (3/8); Aswad Reid 66' (1/2)	Referee: Ruhan Meiring

20 September 2014	SWD U19	13–17	Boland U19	Outeniqua Park, George
11:00	Try: Dundre Maritz 4'; Con: Nathan Scott 5' (1/1); Pen: Nathan Scott 10', 57' (2/2)	Report; Scoreboard	Try: Mishaun Arendse 68'; Pen: Lohan Lubbe 18', 21', 34', 56' (4/4)	Attendance: 200; Referee: Sindile Ngcese

20 September 2014	Falcons U19	38–16	Griffons U19	Barnard Stadium, Kempton Park
11:20	Try: Ruhan Bouwer 25'; Arno Kotzé 44', 55'; Brandan Rieck 58'; Francois Pretorius 67'; Con: Arno Kotzé 26', 59' (2/5); Pen: Arno Kotzé 36', 49', 52' (3/6); Cards: Gideon Roux (yellow card) 20' to 30'	Report; Scoreboard	Try: Gerrit Otto 47'; Con: Jaywinn Juries 48' (1/1); Pen: Jaywinn Juries 4', 18', 30' (3/7); Cards: Luan James (yellow card) 36' to 46'; Cheslin van Rayner (yellow card) 52' to 63'	Referee: Paul Mente

20 September 2014	Pumas U19	25–43	Limpopo Blue Bulls U19	Kees Taljaard Stadium, Middelburg
13:30	Try: Ruan du Plooy; Ian Truter; Dylan Pieterse; Jurie Vermeulen; Con: Dylan du Buisson; Pen: Dylan du Buisson	Report; Scoreboard	Try: Lourens Pretorius; Ryan West; Charl Sander; Brentton Fossati; Matthew-Hank Swanepoel; Con: Charl Sander; Ryan Robinson	Referee: Pieter Maritz

==== Round Eight ====
26 September 2014	Boland U19	49–25	Limpopo Blue Bulls U19	Boland Stadium, Wellington
12:15	Try: Warren Williams 2', 20', 46'; Killian von Mollendorff 13', 52'; Ruan Laubscher 42'; Con: Lohan Lubbe 3', 13', 43', 47', 53' (5/6); Pen: Lohan Lubbe 31', 41', 45' (3/3)	Report; Scoreboard	Try: Favian Wilken 26'; Marco van Staden 62'; Salomon Botha 70'; Con: Ryan Robinson 27' (1/1); Andries Hefer 62' (1/2); Pen: Ryan Robinson 8', 11' (2/3)	Referee: Ruhan Meiring

26 September 2014	Pumas U19	43–40	Griffons U19	Mbombela Stadium, Mbombela
14:50	Try: Dylan Pieterse 3'; Ruan Nel 13', 30'; Damien Bezuidenhout 23', 59'; Jacques Bruce 32'; Xander Kritzinger 65'; Con: Dylan du Buisson 14', 24', 33' (3/5); Chade Gelderman 60' (1/2); Cards: Jacques Bruce (yellow card) 20'	Report; Scoreboard	Try: Luan James 20', 34'; Nathan Kemp 26'; Ezrick Alexander 37'; Gregan Hull 52'; Jaywinn Juries 67'; Con: Luan James (0/1); Jaywinn Juries 27', 34', 38', 53', 68' (5/5); Cards: Anwar Ohlson (yellow card) 4' to 14'	Attendance: 250; Referee: Wilko Esterhuizen

27 September 2014	Griquas U19	10–30	SWD U19	Griqua Park, Kimberley
11:00	Try: Siya Lawu 58', 67'; Con: Aswad Reid (0/2); Pen: Clinton Toua (0/1)	Report; Scoreboard	Try: Nathan Scott 33'; Lohan Potgieter 43'; Domenic Smit 55'; Con: Nathan Scott 34', 44' (2/2); Bradley Sumaro 56' (1/1); Pen: Nathan Scott 3', 6', 37' (3/3); Cards: Lee-Curt Maasdorp (yellow card) 25' to 36'; Deveron Lindoor (yellow card) 58' to 69'	Referee: Jan Venter

Bye/s: Border U19, Falcons U19

==== Semi-finals ====
4 October 2014	Boland U19	35–30	Limpopo Blue Bulls U19	Boland Stadium, Wellington
11:00	Try: Killian von Mollendorff 25'; Gareth Cilliers 47', 59'; Esteban van der Merwe 66'; Con: Lohan Lubbe 26', 60', 67' (3/4); Pen: Lohan Lubbe 11', 32', 46' (3/5)	Report; Scoreboard	Try: Doné Davids 28'; Ryan Robinson 55'; Gerhard van den Heever 64'; Con: Charl Sander 29', 56', 65' (3/3); Pen: Charl Sander 8', 18', 57' (3/4); Cards: Christo Lategan (yellow card) 42'	Referee: Archie Sehlako

4 October 2014	Falcons U19	35–19	Pumas U19	Barnard Stadium, Kempton Park
14:00	Try: Zane Wessels; Arno Kotzé; Ruhann Ferreira; Dudley Thompson; Con: Arno Kotzé; Pen: Arno Kotzé; Cards: Ruhan Bouwer (yellow card) 47' to 57'; Ruhann Ferreira (yellow card) 55' to 65'; Casper Aucamp (yellow card) 68'	Report; Scoreboard	Try: Dylan du Buisson; Abednigo Mashabane; Pen: Dylan du Buisson; Cards: Wian Prinsloo (yellow card); Frans de Beer (yellow card)	Referee: Jaco Kotze

==== Final ====
17 October 2014	Falcons U19	17–42	Boland U19	North West Stadium, Welkom
11:30	Try: Marco Botha 28'; Zane Wessels 35'; Con: Arno Kotzé 29', 35' (2/2); Pen: Arno Kotzé 4' (1/3); Ruhann Ferreira (0/1)	Report; Scoreboard	Try: Warren Williams 16', 48', 66'; Hendrik Carstens 31'; Mishaun Arendse 43'; Con: Lohan Lubbe 17', 44', 49', 67' (4/5); Pen: Lohan Lubbe 53', 56', 63' (3/4)	Attendance: 200; Referee: Lourens van der Merwe

=== Honours ===
2014 Under-19 Provincial Championship
Group B Champions
Boland U19

== Promotion/relegation play-off ==
24 October 2014	Leopards U19	53–33	Boland U19	Olën Park, Potchefstroom
14:00	Try: Louis van der Westhuizen 10'; Allen Muller 21'; Elof Scheepers 26'; Wessel Steyn 36', 48'; Walt Steenkamp 56'; Rudi Pieters 66'; Elden Schoeman 68'; Con: Sydney du Plessis 11', 22', 49', 56', 69' (5/8); Pen: Sydney du Plessis 5' (1/1)	Scoreboard	Try: Esteban van der Merwe 29'; Ruan Laubscher 43'; Gareth Cilliers 50'; Lohan Lubbe 60'; Killian von Mollendorff 62'; Con: Lohan Lubbe 44', 51', 61', 63' (4/5)	Referee: Cwengile Jadezweni

- Leopards U19 remain in Group A.
- Boland U19 remain in Group B.

== See also ==
- 2014 Currie Cup Premier Division
- 2014 Currie Cup qualification
- 2014 Currie Cup First Division
- 2014 Vodacom Cup
- 2014 Under-21 Provincial Championship
