= Jarryd Sage =

South African rugby union player (born 1995)

- Full name: Jarryd Christopher Sage
- Born: 18 August 1995 (age 31) Cape Town, South Africa
- Height: 1.86 m (6 ft 1 in)
- Weight: 95 kg (209 lb; 14 st 13 lb)
- School: Wynberg Boys' High School
- University: University of Cape Town
- Notable relative(s): Doug Hopwood (grandfather); Dylan Sage (brother)

Rugby union career
- Position: Centre
- Current team: Dragons
Youth career
- 2013–2015: Western Province
- 2013–2015: Western Province
Amateur team(s)
Years	Team	Apps	(Points)
2015	UCT Ikey Tigers	0	(0)
Senior career
Years	Team	Apps	(Points)
2015	Western Province	0	(0)
2016–2017	Golden Lions XV	22	(40)
2017	Golden Lions	3	(5)
2017	Eastern Province Kings	3	(5)
2017	Southern Kings	1	(0)
2017–present	Dragons	6	(5)
- Correct as of 28 May 2018

Jarryd Christopher Sage (born 18 August 1995) is a Welsh-qualified South African rugby union player, currently playing with Welsh Pro14 side the Dragons. His regular position is centre. Sage qualifies for Wales through his father, who was born in Newbridge within the Dragons' region.

== Rugby career ==
=== Youth Rugby / Western Province ===
Sage was born in Cape Town, where he attended Wynberg Boys' High School. He earned provincial colours at school level, representing Western Province at the Under-18 Craven Week competition in 2013.

He represented the Western Province U19 team in the Under-19 Provincial Championship in the same year, as returned in 2014 as a member of the Western Province Rugby Institute.

He was included in the UCT Ikey Tigers squad for the 2015 Varsity Cup, and the Western Province squad for the 2015 Vodacom Cup, but didn't feature in either competition. In the latter half of the year, he played for the Western Province U21 team in the Under-21 Provincial Championship, scoring a try for the team in their match against Golden Lions U21 en route to finishing top of the log, and eventually winning the title, beating Free State U21 52–17 in the final.

=== Golden Lions ===
For the 2016 season, Sage moved to Johannesburg to join the Golden Lions. He scored three tries in thirteen appearances for the Golden Lions XV in the 2016 Currie Cup qualification series, and a further two tries for the Golden Lions U21 team in the 2016 Under-21 Provincial Championship in the second half of the season, including the decisive try in the final to help his side to a 38–34 victory over former side Western Province.

He made nine appearances for the Golden Lions in the 2017 Rugby Challenge, helping his side to the semi-finals of the competition. He was included in the Golden Lions Currie Cup squad for the 2017 season and made his debut in that competition in their 36–43 defeat to the Pumas, making three starts in total.

=== Southern Kings / Eastern Province Kings ===
In August 2017, Sage moved to Port Elizabeth to join a Southern Kings team about to embark on their first Pro14 campaign. He did not feature during the start of their season – instead making three appearances for the Eastern Province Kings in the 2017 Currie Cup First Division – but made his debut in their eighth match of the season, a 36–43 defeat to Irish side Ulster in KwaZakele, his only appearance for the team.

=== Dragons ===
In November 2017, Welsh side Dragons announced that Sage would make the move to Newport to join the team.

== Personal life ==
Sage is the grandson of Doug Hopwood, a rugby player that represented the South Africa national rugby union team in 22 test matches between 1961 and 1965. His older brother Dylan is also a professional rugby union player, representing the South Africa Sevens team since 2015.
