= Rabz Maxwane =

South African rugby union player

Rabs Maxwane
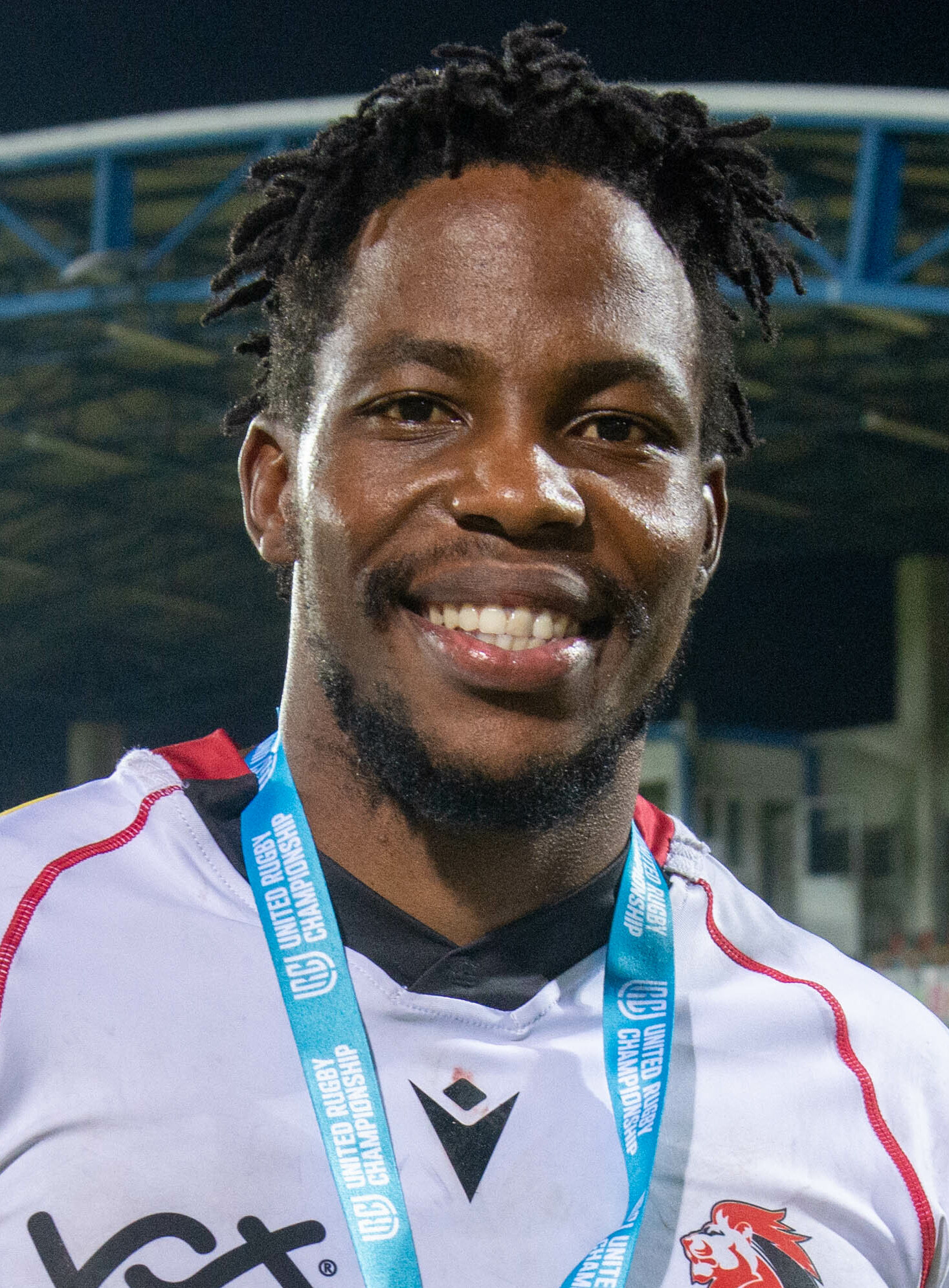
- Maxwane in 2021
- Full name: Sibahle Ndiphiwe Maxwane
- Born: 14 August 1995 (age 31) Queenstown, South Africa
- Height: 1.81 m (5 ft 11 1/2 in)
- Weight: 83 kg (183 lb; 13 st 1 lb)
- School: Dale College

Rugby union career
- Position: Wing
- Current team: Lions / Golden Lions
Youth career
- 2013: Border Bulldogs
- 2014–2016: Western Province
Amateur team(s)
Years	Team	Apps	(Points)
2017	UP Tuks	1	(0)
Senior career
Years	Team	Apps	(Points)
2016	Western Province	8	(10)
2017	Blue Bulls XV	5	(20)
2017	Bulls	1	(0)
2017	Blue Bulls	2	(5)
2017–2020	Cheetahs	35	(105)
2018–2020	Free State Cheetahs	7	(10)
2020–	Lions	46	(85)
2020–	Golden Lions	29	(75)
- Correct as of 26 October 2026

Sibahle Ndiphiwe 'Rabz' Maxwane (born 14 August 1995) is a South African rugby union player for the Lions in the United Rugby Championship, and in the Currie Cup. He usually plays on the wing.

== Rugby career ==
=== 2013 : Youth rugby ===
Maxwane was born in Queenstown and attended Dale College Boys' High School in nearby King William's Town, playing first team rugby for Dale College in 2013 and 2014.

He earned some provincial colours too, when he was named in the Border squad for the 2013 Under-18 Academy Week held in Durban.

=== 2014–2016 : Western Province ===
Maxwane joined the Western Province Rugby Institute for the 2014 season. He was named in the Western Province U19 squad for the 2014 Under-19 Provincial Championship, but failed to make any appearances in the competition. However, he did feature for a Western Province Rugby Academy XV in a match against a France Under-18 team in August 2014.

He was in action for Western Province in 2015, making nine appearances in the Under-21 Provincial Championship. He scored two tries in their 50–14 victory over Leopards U21 as his team finished top of the log after the round-robin stage, but an injury ruled him out of the play-off matches that saw Western Province crowned champions after beating Free State U21 in the final.

He also joined the South Africa Sevens academy, where he was named in the Blitzboks wider training squad that prepared for the 2016 Summer Olympics.

In April 2016, Maxwane made his first class debut, starting their 2016 Currie Cup qualification match against the Blue Bulls. After another start against the Free State XV, he scored his first senior try in a 27–24 victory over the Golden Lions XV in his next match. He made three more starts and two appearances off the bench in the competition, scoring his second try in his final appearance for the team in a 45–17 victory over the SWD Eagles.

He returned to the Under-21 team, starting all eight of their matches in the 2016 Under-21 Provincial Championship. He scored one try against the Blue Bulls U21s and two against the Golden Lions U21 during the regular season to help Western Province finish top of the log. He scored a decisive try in a 26–23 victory over Free State U21 in the semi-finals and his fifth of the season in the final, where his team fell just short, losing 34–38 to the Golden Lions. He finished as his team's top try scorer, and just one behind the top try scorers in the competition, the Leopards U21s' Elden Schoeman and the Sharks U21s' Tristan Blewett, and was also named the team's best back of the season at the annual awards ceremony.

=== 2017–present : Bulls ===
At the end of the 2016 season, the Pretoria-based Blue Bulls announced that Maxwane would join them for the 2017 season; he was subsequently also included in the Bulls Super Rugby squad for the 2017 season.
