= Dylan Sage =

South African rugby union player

- Full name: Dylan Michael Sage
- Born: 24 January 1992 (age 34) Cape Town, South Africa
- Height: 1.87 m (6 ft 1 1/2 in)
- Weight: 87 kg (192 lb; 13 st 10 lb)
- School: Wynberg Boys' High School
- University: University of Cape Town
- Notable relative(s): Doug Hopwood (grandfather); Jarryd Sage (brother)

Rugby union career
- Current team: Bulls / Blue Bulls / Blue Bulls XV
Youth career
- 2012–2013: Western Province
- 2014: Force
Amateur team(s)
Years	Team	Apps	(Points)
2013, 2015	UCT Ikey Tigers	11	(10)
2014	Associates		
Senior career
Years	Team	Apps	(Points)
2018–present	Blue Bulls	9	(5)
2019–present	Bulls	9	(0)
2019–present	Blue Bulls XV	1	(0)
- Correct as of 25 August 2019
International career
Years	Team	Apps	(Points)
2015–2018	South Africa Sevens	134	(155)
- Correct as of 15 November 2018
Medal record
Men's rugby sevens
Representing South Africa
Rugby World Cup Sevens
Bronze medal – third place	2018 San Francisco	Team competition
Olympic Games
Bronze medal – third place	2016 Rio de Janeiro	Team competition

Dylan Michael Sage (born 24 January 1992) is a South African rugby union player for the Bulls in Super Rugby, the Blue Bulls in the Currie Cup and the Blue Bulls XV in the Rugby Challenge.

He was a member of the South African Sevens team that won a bronze medal at the 2016 Summer Olympics.

== Rugby career ==
=== Force ===
Sage was one of a number of South Africans that moved to Perth prior to the 2014 season to join the Force and he was included in their Wider Training Group for the 2014 Super Rugby season. However, he failed to make any appearances at Super Rugby level, but did play in the 2014 Pacific Rugby Cup with the Western Force A side.

=== South Africa Sevens ===
In late 2015, Sage was contracted by the South African Rugby Union to join the South Africa Sevens team. He was named as a member of extended training squad for the side prepared as they for 2016 Summer Olympics He was called in as injury cover for the 2015 South Africa Sevens and subsequently included in the final squad for the event.

=== 2016 Summer Olympics ===
Sage was included in a 12-man squad for the 2016 Summer Olympics in Rio de Janeiro. He was named as a substitute for their first match in Group B of the competition against Spain, with South Africa winning the match 24–0.

== Personal life ==
Sage is the grandson of Doug Hopwood, a rugby player that represented the South Africa national rugby union team in 22 test matches between 1961 and 1965. His younger brother Jarryd is also a professional rugby union player.
