= Fiffy Rampeta =

South African rugby union player

- Full name: Refuoe Emmanuel Rampeta
- Born: 23 March 1995 (age 31) Bloemfontein, South Africa
- Height: 1.73 m (5 ft 8 in)
- Weight: 95 kg (14 st 13 lb; 209 lb)
- School: Louis Botha Technical High School
- University: University of the Free State

Rugby union career
- Position: Flanker
- Current team: Griffons
Youth career
- 2007–2016: Free State Cheetahs
Amateur team(s)
Years	Team	Apps	(Points)
2015–2016	UFS Shimlas	5	(5)
Senior career
Years	Team	Apps	(Points)
2016	Free State XV	10	(10)
- Correct as of 22 April 2018
International career
Years	Team	Apps	(Points)
2013	South Africa Schools	1	(0)
- Correct as of 22 April 2018

Refuoe Emmanuel "Fiffy" Rampeta (born 23 March 1995) is a South African professional rugby union player who last played for the Free State XV in the domestic Currie Cup. His regular position is flanker.

== Rugby career ==
=== 2007–2013: Schoolboy rugby ===
Rampeta was born in Bloemfontein and he represented the Bloemfontein-based Free State at various youth levels, from as early as primary school level, when he represented them at the Under-13 Craven Week tournaments in both 2007 and 2008. At high school level, he played for Free State at the Under-16 Grant Khomo Week tournaments in 2010 and 2011, before progressing to their Under-18 team playing at the premier high school rugby union tournament in South Africa, the Under-18 Craven Week. He also played at the Craven Week on two occasions – at the 2012 tournament in Port Elizabeth and the 2013 tournament in Polokwane, appearing in all three matches in each of those tournaments. After the 2013, he was also included in a South Africa Schools squad, and he played for them in one match, a 17–13 victory over their counterparts from France.

=== 2014–2016: Youth rugby, Varsity Cup and first class debut ===
After high school, Rampeta joined the Free State's youth system. He made seven appearances for the Free State U19 during the 2014 Under-19 Provincial Championship regular season, scoring one try in their 54–15 victory over Leopards U19 as his team finished in second place to qualify for the semi-finals. He started their semi-final match against Western Province U19, but could not prevent his side losing 22–29 to be knocked out of the competition.

At the start of 2015, Rampeta played in the Varsity Cup competition for Bloemfontein-based university side UFS Shimlas. He scored a try in his only start, a 23–21 victory over NMMU Madibaz, Despite being named on the bench for five matches, he only came on as a replacement in two more matches. The second of those appearances was in the final against NWU Pukke, with Shimlas winning the match 63–33 to win the Varsity Cup for the first time in their history. He made just a single appearance in the latter half of the season, coming on as a replacement for the final eight minutes of the Free State U21s' 60–28 victory over Leopards U21 in the 2015 Under-21 Provincial Championship.

Rampeta made two starts for UFS Shimlas in the 2016 Varsity Cup, but his side endured a disappointing season, failing to retain their title by finishing in fifth place on the log to miss out on the semi-finals. He was included in the Free State XV squad that participated in the 2016 Currie Cup qualification series, and he made his first class debut on 9 April 2016, playing off the bench in a 32–17 victory over Namibian side the Welwitschias. After further appearances as a replacement in matches against the Blue Bulls and Western Province, he made his first start in a 29–15 win over the Golden Lions XV. He remained in the run-on side, making a further six starts throughout the competition. He scored his first senior try in his eighth appearance, a 23–14 victory over the Leopards, and followed it up with another in their 33–49 defeat to the Griffons a week later. Rampeta made a total of ten appearances in the competition, helping the Free State XV to finish in sixth place on the log.

Rampeta made five appearances for the Free State U21 team in the 2016 Under-21 Provincial Championship; he started the first three matches, scoring a try in their 43–26 victory over Leopards in the opening round, and played off the bench in their final match of the regular season, scoring another try in a 44–45 defeat to Eastern Province U21. Free State U21 finished in fourth place on the log to qualify for the title play-offs, and Rampeta played off the bench in their 23–26 defeat to Western Province U21 in the semi-final.

In November 2016, he was named in the Cheetahs Super Rugby team's training squad as the team prepared for the 2017 Super Rugby season. It was also announced that he would join the Griffons on loan for the 2017 SuperSport Rugby Challenge series after his involvement in the 2017 Varsity Cup.
