= Gerrie Labuschagné =

South African rugby union player

- Full name: Gerhardus Jacobus Labuschagné
- Born: 5 December 1995 (age 30) Springs, South Africa
- Height: 1.94 m (6 ft 4 1/2 in)
- Weight: 95 kg (209 lb; 14 st 13 lb)
- School: Hoërskool Die Anker, Brakpan
- University: University of the Free State

Rugby union career
- Position: Utility back
- Current team: Houston SaberCats
Youth career
- 2014–2016: Free State Cheetahs
Senior career
Years	Team	Apps	(Points)
2015–2016	Free State XV	5	(4)
2017	Golden Lions XV	2	(20)
2017	Pumas	1	(0)
2018–2020	Yamaha Júbilo	10	(30)
2021	Pumas	1	(3)
2022–	Houston SaberCats	24	(28)
- Correct as of 26 June 2023

Gerhardus Jacobus Labuschagné (born 5 December 1995) is a South African rugby union player who plays for the Houston SaberCats in Major League Rugby (MLR). He previously played for Yamaha Júbilo in the Japanese Top League. He is a utility back that can play as a fullback, centre, wing or fly-half.

== Rugby career ==
=== Youth rugby and Free State XV ===
Labuschagné was born in Springs and went to high school in nearby Brakpan. However, he was never selected to represent his local Falcons team at any provincial schoolboy tournaments. After high school, he moved to Bloemfontein, where he was included in the Free State U19 squad. In July 2014, a video went viral of Labuschagné successfully kicking a penalty from 80m out during a training session at the University of the Free State. He made nine starts in the 2014 Under-19 Provincial Championship, appearing in the right wing, fullback and outside centre position during the season and scoring six points with the boot during a season that saw his team finish in second position, before losing their semi-final match 22–29 to eventual champions, Western Province U19.

Labuschagné was included in the Free State XV squad that played in the 2015 Vodacom Cup competition. He made his first class debut on 18 April 2015, starting as the right wing in their 50–45 victory over the Eastern Province Kings in Round Four of the competition. He made two more starts – against the Border Bulldogs in East London and against Western Province in Bloemfontein – but failed to score any points for his team. He played at Under-21 level in the second half of the season, following up a start for the Free State U21 in their victory over the Sharks U21 team with three appearances as a replacement. The first of those came against Eastern Province U21 during the regular season of the Under-21 Provincial Championship, as the team finished second on the log to qualify for the title play-offs. He also came on as a replacement in their 27–22 victory over Sharks U21 in the semi-final, and in the final against Western Province U21, which the side from Cape Town convincingly won 52–17.

Labuschagné was included in the Cheetahs wider training group for the 2016 Super Rugby season, but made no appearances in that competition. Instead, he once again represented the Free State XV, this time in the 2016 Currie Cup qualification series that effectively replaced the Vodacom Cup. He made two starts; a start at inside centre in a 35–15 win against the Eastern Province Kings was followed by a start at fullback against the other team form the Eastern Cape, the Border Bulldogs. Labuschagné scored his first senior points in this match, kicking two conversions in a 22–18 victory. He was once again in action for the Free State U21 team in the 2016 edition of the Under-21 Provincial Championship, playing in all six of their matches during the regular season. The team finished in fourth spot on the log to qualify for a semi-final, but Labuschagné did not feature in their 23–26 defeat to Western Province. However, the 46 points he scored during the regular season – through tries against Leopards U21 and Eastern Province U21, fifteen conversions and two penalties – made him his side's top scorer during the competition, and fifth overall.
