= Dylan Pieterse =

- Full name: Dylan John Pieterse
- Born: 28 January 1995 (age 31) Kempton Park, South Africa
- Height: 2.00 m (6 ft 6 1/2 in)
- Weight: 115 kg (254 lb; 18 st 2 lb)
- School: King Edward VII School

Rugby union career
- Position: Lock / Flanker
- Current team: Leopards
Youth career
- 2011: Golden Lions
- 2014–2015: Pumas
- 2016: Force
Amateur team(s)
Years	Team	Apps	(Points)
2015	Witbank Ferros	4	(0)
2016	Cottesloe	16	(20)
Senior career
Years	Team	Apps	(Points)
2016	Eastern Province Kings	5	(0)
2017	Boland Cavaliers	5	(0)
2019	Austin Elite	7	(0)
2019	Leopards	5	(0)
2020-	Old Glory DC		
- Correct as of 25 August 2019

Dylan John Pieterse (born 28 January 1995) is a South African rugby union player for the Leopards in the Currie Cup. His regular position is lock or flanker.

== Early life ==
Pieterse was born in Kempton Park and attended King Edward VII School in Johannesburg. In 2011, he was selected to represent the Golden Lions at the Under-16 Grant Khomo Week tournament held in Queenstown, where he made two appearances.

He played first team rugby for KES in 2012 and 2013, but did not earn any further provincial callups.

== 2014–2015 : Pumas / Witbank Ferros ==
Pieterse spent some time training at the Blue Bulls academy, before joining the Nelspruit-based Pumas for the 2014 Under-19 Provincial Championship. He made seven appearances for the Pumas U19 team in Group B of the competition, scoring seven tries, the most by a Pumas player in the competition. He scored two tries in his first match, a 40–27 victory over SWD U19 and a hat-trick of tries in their Round Five match against Border U19 in a 60–29 victory. Further tries against Limpopo Blue Bulls U19 and Griffons U19 followed as he helped the Pumas to finish in fourth spot on the log. The Pumas lost to the Falcons U19 in Pieterse's home town of Kempton Park in the final, but he received a personal accolade after the season by being voted the Pumas' Under-19 player of the Year.

At the start of 2015, Pieterse played amateur club rugby, making four appearances for the Witbank Ferros during the Community Cup competition. The team failed to qualify from Pool D, winning just one of their four matches.

He rejoined the Pumas in the second half of the year, starting five matches for the Pumas U21 side during the Under-21 Provincial Championship. He weighed in with two tries – in victories over Border U21 and Griffons U21 – to help the Pumas win all seven of their matches in the regular season to top the log. The team did not take part in the title play-offs, however, since they were deducted all their log points after fielding ineligible players during the competition.

== 2016: Western Force / Cottesloe ==
Pieterse moved to Australia to join the Perth-based Western Force's Future Force program, also playing club rugby for Cottesloe in the Premier Grade (1st Grade), the premier league in Western Australia. He made sixteen appearances in the competitions, and scored four tries – a brace against Wanneroo was followed by one try against Associates in his next match and another against UWA later in the competition. He helped the team reach the semi-finals of the competition, where they lost to Wests Scarborough.

== 2016: Eastern Province Kings ==
He returned to South Africa to join the Eastern Province Kings prior to the 2016 Currie Cup. He came on as a replacement in their third match of the competition, a 6–36 defeat to Western Province, before being promoted to the starting lineup in their midweek match against Griquas. He also started matches against the Free State Cheetahs, Sharks and former team the Pumas, but could not help his team achieve a victory in the competition, losing all eight of their matches to finish bottom of the log.
