= Eduard Zandberg =

South African rugby union player

- Full name: Eduard Le Roux Zandberg
- Born: 14 February 1996 (age 30) George, South Africa
- Height: 2.01 m (6 ft 7 in)
- Weight: 121 kg (267 lb; 19 st 1 lb)

Rugby union career
- Position: Lock
Youth career
- 2009–2014: SWD Eagles
- 2015–2017: Western Province
Senior career
Years	Team	Apps	(Points)
2016–2017	Western Province	12	(10)
- Correct as of 18 April 2018
International career
Years	Team	Apps	(Points)
2014	South Africa Schools		
2016	South Africa Under-20	3	(0)
- Correct as of 18 April 2018

Eduard Le Roux Zandberg (born 14 February 1996) is a South African rugby union player who last played for Western Province in the Currie Cup. His regular position is lock.
