= Jasper Wiese =

South African rugby union player

- Full name: Jasper van der Westhuizen Wiese
- Born: 21 October 1995 (age 31) Upington, South Africa
- Height: 1.89 m (6 ft 2 1/2 in)
- Weight: 122 kg (19 st 3 lb; 269 lb)
- School: Hoërskool Upington
- University: Central University of Technology
- Notable relative: Cobus Wiese (brother)

Rugby union career
- Position: Eighth man / Flanker
- Current team: Urayasu D-Rocks
Youth career
- 2011–2013: Griquas Country Districts
- 2014–2016: Free State Cheetahs
Amateur team(s)
Years	Team	Apps	(Points)
2014–2016	CUT Ixias	11	(10)
Senior career
Years	Team	Apps	(Points)
2016–2017	Free State XV	24	(55)
2017	Griffons	6	(15)
2017–2020	Free State Cheetahs	16	(25)
2017–2020	Cheetahs	13	(15)
2020–2024	Leicester Tigers	79	(105)
2024-	Urayasu D-Rocks	26	(45)
- Correct as of 23 May 2026
International career
Years	Team	Apps	(Points)
2021–	South Africa	52	(20)
- Correct as of 13 November 2026
Medal record
Men's Rugby union
Representing South Africa
Rugby World Cup
Gold medal – first place	2023 France	Squad

(Note: According to the SA Rugby Annual 2019, Wiese came on in the 2017–18 Pro14 match against Zebre. However, according to the Pro14 website, he was an unused substitute in the match. This potential appearance has been excluded from Wiese's appearance stats.)

Jasper van der Westhuizen Wiese (born 21 October 1995) is a South African professional rugby union player who plays for Urayasu D-Rocks in Japan's Rugby League One and South Africa internationally. He can play as a number 8 or a flanker.

== Rugby career ==
=== 2011–2013: Schoolboy rugby ===
Wiese was born and grew up in Upington. He attended and played rugby for Hoërskool Upington, which resulted in provincial call-ups for Griquas Country Districts in 2011, 2012 and 2013.

In 2011, Wiese was included in their Under-16 Grant Khomo Week squad for the tournament held in Queenstown. He started all three of their matches, scoring two tries in their second match against Border Country Districts in a 36–15 win and one in their final match against Namibia. His three tries during the tournament placed him in joint-third in the try-scoring charts for the competition, just one behind the leading try scorers.

The following year, Wiese was included in the Griquas Country Districts squad that competed in South Africa's premier rugby union tournament at high school level, the Under-18 Craven Week, held in Port Elizabeth. He emulated his appearance and try-scoring record at the previous year's Grant Khomo Week, scoring three tries in three starts. This time, he scored a hat-trick of tries in a 38–5 victory over Border Country Districts in their second match at the tournament, again a single try behind the leading try-scorers in the competition.

Wiese once again represented his team at the Under-18 Craven Week in 2013, held in Polokwane, starting all three matches and scoring two tries; he scored for the third successive year against Border Country Districts in their opening match and a second against the Leopards in their final match.

=== 2014–2016: Free State and CUT Ixias ===
After high school, Wiese moved to Bloemfontein, where he joined the academy of the Free State Cheetahs and the CUT Ixias university team. He made four appearances for CUT in group stages of the 2014 Varsity Shield competition – one of which was in the run-on side – in a season that saw his team win the competition by beating UKZN Impi in the final and subsequently winning promotion to the Varsity Cup for 2015. In the second half of the season, Wiese played for the Free State U19 team in the Under-19 Provincial Championship. He started all of their matches in the number eight jersey, helping them to second spot on the log by scoring nine tries in the competition, second only to Blue Bulls U19' Jurie Linde in Group A of the competition. He didn't score in the first seven rounds of the competition, but got off the mark in a 34–0 victory over Golden Lions U19s in Round Eight. He scored four tries in their 54–15 victory over Leopards U19 in their next match, and a try in each of the last three matches of the regular season, against Blue Bulls U19, Western Province U19 and Golden Lions U19. His final try came in their semi-final match against Western Province U19, but it wasn't enough to help his side into the final, with the team from Cape Town winning 29–22.

Wiese was invited to trials for the South Africa Under-20 squad as they prepared for the 2015 World Rugby Under 20 Championship, but wasn't included in the training squad named a week later. He also didn't feature for CUT Ixias in the 2015 Varsity Cup or for the Free State XV in the 2015 Vodacom Cup, despite being included in both squads, but returned to action in the second half of the season by playing for Free State U21 in the Under-21 Provincial Championship. With Steven Meiring being the first choice eighth man for the team, Wiese shifted to the flank, where he made nine starts and three appearances of the bench. He once again scored several tries for his team – he got tries in matches against Eastern Province U21, Sharks U21, Blue Bulls U21 and Leopards U21, before scoring a hat-trick in their return match against the Sharks U21 in a 74–22 win. Wiese ended the competition as his team's third-highest try scorer behind fellow loose forwards Daniel Maartens and Steven Meiring, as the team finished in second place on the log. Wiese helped them to a 27–22 victory over the Sharks in the semi-final, but the team fell short, losing 17–52 to Western Province U21 in the final.

Wiese got his first taste of Varsity Cup action at the start of 2016, making seven appearances for CUT Ixias in the competition. He scored tries in matches against UP Tuks and NMMU Madibaz as his side finished in sixth spot on the log despite a two-point deduction for fielding an ineligible player. After the Varsity Cup, Wiese joined the Free State XV team for their Currie Cup qualification season. He made his first class debut on 16 April 2016, starting their 17–20 defeat to the Blue Bulls in Round Two of the competition. After another start against Western Province the following week, Wiese scored the first senior try of his career in a 29–15 victory over the Golden Lions XV in Randburg in his side's next match. He eventually made eight starts and one appearance off the bench during the competition as his team finished in sixth spot in the competition. He again reverted to U21 level for the end of the season, where he captained the team in their first four matches, scoring tries in matches against Leopards U21, Blue Bulls U21 and Western Province U21 to help his team to fourth spot on the log. He scored another try in their semi-final against Western Province, but his team's interest in the competition was ended with a 23–26 defeat.

=== 2017: Cheetahs and Griffons ===
At the end of 2016, Wiese was included in the Cheetahs Super Rugby team's training group for the 2017 Super Rugby season, but it was also announced that he would link up with the Welkom-based Griffons after his Varsity Cup commitments.

=== 2020-2024: Leicester Tigers ===
On 23 July 2020 it was announced Wiese would move to England to join Leicester Tigers in Premiership Rugby from the 2020-21 season. Wiese made his Leicester debut against Gloucester only four days after meeting his team mates but impressed with his powerful carrying. He was named as the Man of the Match by broadcaster BT Sport for his performance against Bath on 3 January 2021, and his performances drew comparison with Duane Vermeulen along with speculation about a possible international call up by South Africa. On 20 February 2021 Wiese scored Leicester's first try in a win against Wasps but was sent off in the first half for hitting an opponent's head with a dangerous ruck clear out, and was subsequently banned for four weeks.

On 5 June 2021 Wiese was called up to the Springboks squad for their test series against the British and Irish Lions. He made his international debut for South Africa on 2 July 2021 as a substitute against Georgia.

Wiese was named as Man of the Match in the 2022 Premiership final, he scored the second try in Leicester's 15-12 win against Saracens.

In 2023, Wiese was named to the Springbok's World Cup squad and listed in the starting XV for the Boks opening match against Scotland, played at Stade De Velondrome, Marseille, France, on September 10, 2023.

In the 2022–23 Premiership Rugby season Wiese was voted as the Rugby Players Association Players' Player of the Year due to his performances as Leicester came third in the league, losing the play off semi final to Sale Sharks.

In May 2024, following an impressive season he was named in the Premiership Rugby Team of the Season for the 2023–24 campaign.

=== Urayasu D-Rocks ===
On 1 July 2024, it was confirmed that Wiese has moved to Japan to sign for Urayasu D-Rocks in the Japan Rugby League One competition after announcing his leave from Leicester Tigers.

== International statistics ==
=== Test Match record ===
As of 15 November 2026

Against	P	W	D	L	Tri	Pts	%Won
Argentina	9	8	0	1	1	5	88.89
Australia	4	1	0	3	0	0	25
British & Irish Lions	2	2	0	0	0	0	100
England	3	2	0	1	0	0	66.67
France	2	1	0	1	0	0	50
Georgia	1	1	0	0	0	0	100
Ireland	3	1	0	2	0	0	33.33
Italy	4	4	0	0	0	0	100
Japan	1	1	0	0	0	0	100
New Zealand	12	9	0	3	0	0	75
Scotland	3	3	0	0	1	5	100
Tonga	1	1	0	0	0	0	100
Wales	7	7	0	0	2	10	100
Total	52	41	0	11	4	20	78.85

Pld = Games Played, W = Games Won, D = Games Drawn, L = Games Lost, Tri = Tries Scored, Pts = Points Scored

=== International tries ===
As of 18 July 2026

Try	Opposing team	Location	Venue	Competition	Date	Result	Score
1	Argentina	Durban, South Africa	Kings Park Stadium	2022 Rugby Championship	24 September 2022	Win	38–21
2	Scotland	Edinburgh, Scotland	Murrayfield Stadium	2024 end-of-year tests	10 November 2024	Win	15–32
3	Wales	Cardiff, Wales	Millennium Stadium	2025 end-of-year tests	29 November 2025	Win	0–73
4	Wales	Durban, South Africa	Kings Park Stadium	2026 Nations Championship	18 July 2026	Win	43–0

== Personal life ==
He's married to Anja, and they have a child together. Wiese is the older brother of Cobus Wiese, also a South African rugby union player.

== Honours ==
South Africa

- 2023 Rugby World Cup winner
- 2024 Rugby Championship winner
- 2025 Rugby Championship winner

Leicester Tigers

- 2021–22 Premiership Rugby winner
