= Justin Phillips (rugby union) =

South African rugby union player

- Full name: Justin David Phillips
- Born: 3 February 1995 (age 31) Pretoria, South Africa
- Height: 1.80 m (5 ft 11 in)
- Weight: 83 kg (13 st 1 lb; 183 lb)
- School: Hoërskool Waterkloof

Rugby union career
- Position: Scrum-half
- Current team: Stormers / Western Province
Youth career
- 2011–2013: Blue Bulls
- 2014–2016: Western Province
Senior career
Years	Team	Apps	(Points)
2015–2020	Western Province	42	(50)
2017–19	Stormers	25	(10)
2020-	Stade Olympique Chamberien Rugby	14	(15)
- Correct as of 25 August 2019
International career
Years	Team	Apps	(Points)
2012–2013	South Africa Schools	4	(0)
- Correct as of 18 April 2018

Justin David Phillips (born 3 February 1995) is a South African rugby union player for the Stormers in Super Rugby and Western Province in the Currie Cup and in the Rugby Challenge. His regular position is scrum-half.

== Rugby career ==
=== Schoolboy rugby ===
Phillips was born in Pretoria and represented the Blue Bulls at the Under-16 Grant Khomo Week in 2011 and at the Under-18 Craven Week in 2012 and 2013. In both 2012 and 2013, he was included in a South Africa Schools squad after the Craven Week tournament. In 2012, he started matches against France and England, while in 2013, he started against England and came on as a replacement against Wales.

=== Western Province ===
After high school, he moved to Cape Town to join the Western Province Rugby Institute. He started nine matches for the Western Province U19 team during the 2014 Under-19 Provincial Championship, scoring four tries. His first try came in a 21–20 win over Eastern Province U19 before scoring two tries in a 43–24 victory over the Leopards U19s in Potchefstroom. His fourth try came in their 29–22 victory over Free State U19 in the semi-finals to send them to the final, which they also won, beating Phillips' old side the Blue Bulls 33–26.

He made his first class debut during the 2015 Vodacom Cup, coming on as a replacement for Western Province in their 32–12 victory over a Sharks XV. Three more appearances off the bench followed during the play-offs, in victories over a Leopards XV in the quarter finals and the Blue Bulls in the semi-finals, as well as in their 7–24 defeat to the Pumas in the final of the competition.

Phillips made twelve appearances for Western Province U21 in the 2015 Under-21 Provincial Championship, scoring tries against Golden Lions U21, Blue Bulls U21, Leopards U21 and a brace in their return leg against the Blue Bulls in Cape Town to help his side finish top of the log. He was also in the starting line-up for their semi-final victory over the Golden Lions and their victory in the final over the Free State to win a youth title for the second year in a row.

He appeared for Western Province in the 2016 Currie Cup qualification series, scoring tries in matches against a Free State XV, the Eastern Province Kings and the Griffons.
