= Jo-Hanko de Villiers =

South African rugby union player

- Born: 28 April 1996 (age 30) Bloemfontein, South Africa
- Height: 1.92 m (6 ft 3 1/2 in)
- Weight: 110 kg (240 lb; 17 st 5 lb)
- School: Hoërskool Eldoraigne
- University: University of Johannesburg

Rugby union career
- Position: Eighth man
- Current team: Griquas
Youth career
- 2015–2017: Golden Lions
Senior career
Years	Team	Apps	(Points)
2016–2019	Golden Lions XV	8	(30)
2017–2019	Golden Lions	3	(0)
2019	Lions	0	(0)
2021–	Griquas	0	(0)
- Correct as of 3 March 2021

Jo-Hanko de Villiers (born 28 April 1996) is a South African rugby union player for the Lions in Super Rugby, the Golden Lions in the Currie Cup and the Golden Lions XV in the Rugby Challenge. His regular position is eighth man.
