= Grant Hermanus =

South African rugby union player

- Full name: Grant Hagan Hermanus
- Born: 10 November 1995 (age 31) Cape Town, South Africa
- Height: 1.77 m (5 ft 9 1/2 in)
- Weight: 78 kg (12 st 4 lb; 172 lb)
- School: Paarl Gimnasium

Rugby union career
- Position: Fullback / Flyhalf / Winger
- Current team: Olimpia Lions
Youth career
- 2012–2016: Western Province
Senior career
| Years | Team | Apps | (Points) |
| 2015–2018 | Western Province | 26 | (116) |
| 2019 | Griquas | 5 | (5) |
| 2020– | Olimpia Lions | 1 | (0) |
- Correct as of 3 September 2019
International career
| Years | Team | Apps | (Points) |
| 2013 | South Africa Schools | 2 | (3) |
| 2015 | South Africa Under-20 | 3 | (0) |
- Correct as of 20 April 2018

Grant Hagan Hermanus (born 10 November 1995 in Cape Town, South Africa) is a South African rugby union player for Griquas in the Currie Cup and the Rugby Challenge. He can play as a fullback, flyhalf, wing.

== Career ==
=== Youth ===
Hermanus was selected to represent Western Province at the premier South African rugby union competition for high schools, the Under-18 Craven Week, in 2012 in Port Elizabeth. He made three appearances and scored one try in their match against South Western Districts.

Still eligible to play at Under-18 level the following year, he was once again called up to represent the Western Province team at the 2013 tournament in Polokwane, this time playing as their main kicker. He scored 45 points in three matches, consisting of twelve conversions and seven penalties. His performances also led to his inclusion in the 2013 South African Schools team. He played two matches for them; he played in their match against England, scoring an early penalty to set them on their way to a 19–14 victory. He also played in a 14–13 win over Wales eight days later.

After finishing high school, Hermanus joined the Western Province Rugby Institute in 2014. He was a member of the Western Province U19 side that participated in the 2014 Under-19 Provincial Championship. He made eight starts for the side during the regular season of the competition – scoring two tries in their Round Eight match against the Blue Bulls U19 – to help them qualify for the semi-finals. He started their 29–22 victory over Free State U19 in the semi-finals and also ended up on the winning side of the final, with his side running out 33–26 winners over the Blue Bulls U19 in the final in Cape Town.

In April 2015, he was included in a South African Under-20 squad to tour Argentina as final preparation prior to the 2015 World Rugby Under 20 Championship: He scored a try in their 25–22 victory over Argentina in the first match and played the full 80 minutes of the second match.

Upon the team's return, he was named in the final squad for the 2015 World Rugby Under 20 Championship. He didn't feature in their match in Pool B of the competition, a 33–5 win against hosts Italy, but started their 40–8 win against Samoa and played off the bench in a 46–13 win over Australia to help South Africa finish top of Pool B to qualify for the semi-finals with the best record pool stage of all the teams in the competition. He didn't play in their semi-final match against England, which they lost 20–28 to be eliminated from the competition by England for the second year in succession, but did come on as a replacement in their third-place play-off match against France, helping South Africa to a 31–18 win to secure third place in the competition.

=== Western Province ===
He made his first class debut for Western Province during the 2015 Vodacom Cup; he started their second match of the season against a Sharks XV and also scored his first try in this match, dotting down just after half-time in a 32–12 victory over their Durban rivals. He also played in a 19–13 victory over the Eastern Province Kings in Port Elizabeth.

=== Griquas ===
Prior to the 2019 season, Hermanus moved to Kimberley to join Griquas.
