= Frans van Wyk =

South African rugby union player

- Full name: Frans Roelf Petrus van Wyk
- Born: 25 April 1995 (age 31) Delareyville, South Africa
- Height: 1.90 m (6 ft 3 in)
- Weight: 128 kg (20 st 2 lb; 282 lb)
- School: Hoërskool Monument, Krugersdorp
- University: University of South Africa

Rugby union career
- Position: Prop
- Current team: Lions / Golden Lions / Golden Lions XV
Youth career
- 2008: Griffons
- 2011–2013: Golden Lions
- 2014–2016: Western Province
Senior career
Years	Team	Apps	(Points)
2015–2017	Western Province	20	(5)
2017	Stormers	2	(0)
2018	Bulls	10	(0)
2018	Blue Bulls	1	(0)
2019–present	Lions	8	(0)
2019–present	Golden Lions XV	3	(0)
2019–present	Golden Lions	1	(0)
- Correct as of 17 March 2020
International career
Years	Team	Apps	(Points)
2015	South Africa Under-20	5	(5)
- Correct as of 13 April 2018

Frans Roelf Petrus van Wyk (born 25 April 1995 in Delareyville, South Africa) is a South African rugby union player for the Lions in Super Rugby, the Golden Lions in the Currie Cup and the Golden Lions XV in the Rugby Challenge. He regularly plays as a prop.

== Career ==
He went to primary school in Kroonstad, where he earned a provincial call-up to represent the Griffons at the Under-13 Craven Week competition in 2008.

He moved to Gauteng and went to Monument High School in Krugersdorp, which meant he would represent the Golden Lions provincially. He appeared for them at the 2011 Under-16 Grant Khomo week, as well as at the premier South African high school rugby competition, the Under-18 Craven Week, in both 2012 and 2013.

After high school, he made the move to Cape Town to join the Western Province Rugby Institute. He was included in the Western Province U19 side that participated in the 2014 Under-19 Provincial Championship and started the season in fine form, scoring two tries in their opening match of the season against Free State U19 in a 50–26 victory. He made a total of nine appearances in both the loosehead and tighthead prop position as they went all the way in the competition, beating the Blue Bulls U19 33–26 in the final in Cape Town to be crowned the 2014 champions.

He made his first class debut on 21 March 2015, coming on as a substitute for Western Province in their 2015 Vodacom Cup match against the Boland Cavaliers in Caledon. He also played off the bench in their next match against a Sharks XV in Crawford.

He was named in a 37-man training squad for the South Africa national under-20 rugby union team and featured for them in a friendly match against a Varsity Cup Dream Team in April 2015. He was also included in the squad that embarked on a two-match tour of Argentina. He came on as a replacement in their 25–22 victory over Argentina, but did not feature in their 39–28 victory a few days later.

Upon the team's return, he was named in the final squad for the 2015 World Rugby Under 20 Championship. He played off the bench in all three of their matches in Pool B of the competition; a 33–5 win against hosts Italy which saw Van Wyk score South Africa's final try of the match in the 78th minute, a 40–8 win against Samoa and a 46–13 win over Australia to help South Africa finish top of Pool B to qualify for the semi-finals with the best record pool stage of all the teams in the competition. Van Wyk also came on as a replacement in their semi-final match against England, but could not prevent them losing 20–28 to be eliminated from the competition by England for the second year in succession, as well as in their third-place play-off match against France, where he helped South Africa to a 31–18 win to secure third place in the competition.
