= Nardus Erasmus =

South African rugby union player

- Full name: Albertus Bernardus Erasmus
- Born: 15 March 1995 (age 31) Pretoria, South Africa
- Height: 1.91 m (6 ft 3 in)
- Weight: 104 kg (229 lb; 16 st 5 lb)
- School: Hoërskool Waterkloof
- University: University of the Free State

Rugby union career
- Position: Flank
- Current team: Free State Cheetahs
Youth career
- 2008–2011: Blue Bulls
- 2014–2016: Free State Cheetahs
Senior career
Years	Team	Apps	(Points)
2016	Free State XV	2	(5)
2018	Free State Cheetahs	3	(0)
- Correct as of 22 September 2018

Albertus Bernardus Erasmus (born 15 March 1995) is a South African rugby union player who last played for the Free State Cheetahs in the Currie Cup. His regular position is flank.
