= Doug Hopwood =

South African rugby union player

- Full name: Douglas John Hopwood
- Born: 3 June 1934 Cape Town, South Africa
- Died: 10 January 2002 (aged 67) Cape Town, South Africa

Rugby union career
- Position: No. 8
International career
Years	Team	Apps	(Points)
1960–65	South Africa	22	(15)

Douglas John Hopwood (3 June 1934 – 10 January 2002) was a South African rugby union international.

Hopwood was born in Cape Town and attended Wynberg Boys' High School. A back injury suffered while lifting weights as a schoolboy would hamper him through his career and he would regularly have to take painkillers before a match.

A back-row forward, Hopwood represented the Springboks in 22 Test matches from 1960 to 1965. He received plaudits for his role in South Africa's 1960–61 European tour, where the Springboks achieved the grand slam by beating the four home nations, in particular for his performance in torrential conditions against Wales.

Hopwood had the distinction of captaining Western Province late in his career and would have been captain of the Springboks for the 1965 tour of New Zealand, only for the selector's choice to be vetoed by the board.

Following his career, Hopwood worked for South African Breweries. He was married with three children.

== See also ==
- List of South Africa national rugby union players
