= Godfrey Ramaboea =

South African rugby union player

- Full name: Tshegofatso Godfrey Ramaboea
- Born: 18 June 1995 (age 31) Johannesburg, South Africa
- Height: 1.74 m (5 ft 8 1/2 in)
- Weight: 81 kg (179 lb; 12 st 11 lb)
- School: King Edward VII School
- University: University of Johannesburg

Rugby union career
- Position: Wing
- Current team: Falcons (rugby union)
Youth career
- 2008–2016: Golden Lions
Senior career
Years	Team	Apps	(Points)
2016	Golden Lions XV	1	(0)
2018–2019	Griquas	7	(15)
2021–	Falcons	7	(15)
- Correct as of 27 March 2022

Tshegofatso Godfrey Ramaboea (born 18 June 1995) is a South African rugby union player for Falcons in the Currie Cup and the Rugby Challenge. His regular position is wing.
