= Damian Stevens =

Namibia international rugby union player

- Full name: Damian Leothon Stevens
- Born: 2 June 1995 (age 31) Walvis Bay, Namibia
- Height: 1.65 m (5 ft 5 in)
- Weight: 81.5 kg (12 st 12 lb; 180 lb)
- School: Walvis Bay High School, Paarl Boys' High School

Rugby union career
- Position: Scrumhalf / Winger
- Current team: Sharks XV
Youth career
- 2013–2016: Western Province
Amateur team(s)
| Years | Team | Apps | (Points) |
| 2015 | UWC | 8 | (15) |
Senior career
| Years | Team | Apps | (Points) |
| 2016 | Western Province | 4 | (0) |
| 2017 | Sharks XV | 4 | (0) |
| 2018 | Griquas | 4 | (0) |
| 2018 | Boland Cavaliers | 6 | (6) |
| 2019 | Sharks XV | 4 | (0) |
| 2020 | Olimpia Lions | 1 | (0) |
| 2021− | New Orleans Gold | | |
- Correct as of 27 October 2018
International career
| Years | Team | Apps | (Points) |
| 2015 | Namibia Under 20 | 4 | (5) |
| 2015–present | Namibia | 39 | (46) |
- Correct as of 14 September 2019

Damian Leothon Stevens (born 2 June 1995) is a Namibian rugby union player for South African side Sharks XV in the Rugby Challenge. He currently plays for NOLA Gold of Major League Rugby (MLR) in the United States. He is also the head coach of the Harahan River Coyotes Rugby Football Club.

He was named in Namibia's squad for the 2015 Rugby World Cup.

He started his career with the Cape Town-based Western Province, but moved to the Sharks in 2016.

== International career ==
Damian played in both the 2015 and 2019 Rugby World Cups. In the 2019 Rugby World Cup, he scored 14 points: Namibia's opening try against Italy, and 9 points (from penalties) against New Zealand.
