= Christo van der Merwe =

Namibia international rugby union player

- Born: 5 January 1995 (age 31) Windhoek, Namibia
- Height: 1.83 m (6 ft 0 in)
- Weight: 101 kg (223 lb; 15 st 13 lb)
- School: Paul Roos Gymnasium, Stellenbosch
- University: University of Stellenbosch

Rugby union career
- Position: Flanker
- Current team: Welwitschias
Youth career
- 2014–2016: Western Province
Senior career
Years	Team	Apps	(Points)
2016	Western Province	4	(5)
2017–present	Welwitschias	6	(15)
- Correct as of 22 July 2018
International career
Years	Team	Apps	(Points)
2016–2017	Namibia	7	(0)
- Correct as of 22 July 2018

Christo van der Merwe (born 5 January 1995) is a Namibian rugby union player for the Welwitschias in the Currie Cup and the Rugby Challenge. His regular position is flanker.

== Rugby career ==
Van der Merwe was born in Windhoek. He made his test debut for Namibia in 2016 against Kenya and represented the Welwitschias in the South African domestic Currie Cup and Vodacom Cup since 2017.
