= Shaun Reynolds (rugby union) =

South African rugby union player

- Born: 15 June 1995 (age 31) Bloemfontein, South Africa
- Height: 1.87 m (6 ft 1 1/2 in)
- Weight: 91 kg (201 lb; 14 st 5 lb)
- School: Goudveld Hoërskool, Welkom

Rugby union career
- Position: Fly-half / Centre
- Current team: USON Nevers
Youth career
- 2008–2013: Griffons
- 2014–2016: Golden Lions
Senior career
Years	Team	Apps	(Points)
2015–2018	Golden Lions XV	26	(304)
2017–2020	Lions	16	(33)
2017–2020	Golden Lions	18	(196)
2020–Present	USON Nevers	109	(944)
- Correct as of 11 December 2025

Shaun Reynolds (born 15 June 1995) is a South African rugby union player for the Lions in Super Rugby, the Golden Lions in the Currie Cup and the Golden Lions XV in the Rugby Challenge. His regular position is fly-half.

== Rugby career ==
=== Schoolboy rugby / Griffons ===
Reynolds was born in Bloemfontein, but grew up in Welkom, where he earned call-ups to represent the Griffons provincial side at national competitions since primary school level. He represented them at the Under-13 Craven Week in 2008, the Under-16 Grant Khomo Week in 2011 and played twice at the premier high school rugby union tournament in South Africa, the Under-18 Craven Week, in 2012 and 2013. He was the main kicker for the team at the 2013 event held in Polokwane, kicking 47 points in addition to scoring two tries to finish the tournament as the overall top scorer. He also played at Under-19 level for the Griffons in their 2012 and 2013 campaigns.

=== Youth rugby / Golden Lions ===
After school, Reynolds moved to Johannesburg, where he joined the Golden Lions Academy. He played for the Golden Lions U19 team in the 2014 Under-21 Provincial Championship, scoring 74 points in nine starts. His tally included four tries, with two of those coming in a 41–36 victory over the Sharks U21s.

He was named on the bench for the Golden Lions XV's 2015 Vodacom Cup match against the Pumas, but failed to make an appearance. He played for the Golden Lions U21 team in the 2015 Under-19 Provincial Championship, scoring 84 points in 12 appearances, top-scoring for his side and fourth overall in Group A of the competition. (Note: On the SARU points scorer page, Arrie Vosloo's are split; some of them are listed against Jacobus Vosloo. This is due to duplicate player profiles existing for the player. If added together, he was the third top scorer.)

=== Senior career ===
Reynolds was named in the Golden Lions XV squad for the 2016 Currie Cup qualification series. He made his first class debut by coming on as a replacement in their opening match against the Border Bulldogs in a 23–27 defeat. He again played off the bench in their next match against Namibian side the Welwitschias in Windhoek and scored his first senior points as he converted to tries in a 66–12 victory for his side. He was promoted to the starting line-up for their next match against Gauteng rivals the Blue Bulls and kicked eleven points in a 38–17 victory. The next week, he scored his first senior try in a 24–27 defeat to Western Province in Cape Town.

He alternated the starting fly-half spot with the more experienced Marnitz Boshoff for the next few weeks of the campaign, before travelling with the Lions Super Rugby team for their final match of the regular season against the Jaguares in Buenos Aires.
