= 2019 World Rugby Under 20 Championship =

2019 Under 20 Championship
Tournament details
- Host: Argentina
- Venue: 2
- Date: June 4–22
- Teams: 12

Final positions
- Champions: France (2nd title)
- Runner-up: Australia
- Third place: South Africa
- Fourth place: Argentina

Tournament statistics
- Matches played: 30
- Tries scored: 223 (7.43 per match)
- Top scorer(s): Josh Hodge (63 points)
- Most tries: Ewan Ashman (7 tries)

The 2019 World Rugby Under 20 Championship was the twelfth edition of the premier age-grade competition for rugby. The tournament was held in Argentina for the second time, having been hosted there in 2010.

Defending champions France won the under 20 title again in 2019, defeating Australia in a closely fought final by 24–23 at the Racecourse Stadium in Rosario. The city of Santa Fe also hosted matches in the 2019 championship.

== Teams ==
The teams that participated in the tournament are listed in the table below, with a summary of their previous best results at the World Rugby Under 20 Championship included.

Team	No.	Result (2018)	Best Result
Argentina	12	6th	Third place (2016)
Australia	12	5th	Runners-up (2010)
England	12	2nd	Champions (2013, 2014, 2016)
France	12	1st	Champions (2018)
Georgia	4	9th	Ninth place (2018)
Ireland	12	11th	Runners-up (2016)
Italy	10	8th	Eighth place (2017, 2018)
Fiji	8	—	Sixth place (2011)
New Zealand	12	4th	Champions (2008, 2009, 2010, 2011, 2015, 2017)
Scotland	12	10th	Fifth place (2017)
South Africa	12	3rd	Champions (2012)
Wales	12	7th	Runners-up (2013)

== Pool stage ==
The pool stage fixture was as follows:

=== Pool A ===
Team	Pld	W	D	L	PF	PA	−/+	TF	TA	BP	Pts
Argentina	3	2	0	1	113	70	+43	15	8	3	11
France	3	2	0	1	94	80	+14	13	9	3	11
Wales	3	2	0	1	87	85	+2	10	11	1	9
Fiji	3	0	0	3	62	121	−59	8	18	1	1

Match 3	4 June	Argentina	25–30	Wales	Racecourse Stadium, Rosario
	13:00 AST (UTC–03)	Try: Minervino 11' c Isgro Alastra 44' m Mendy 60' c Con: Prisciantelli (1/2) 12' de la Vega Mendia (1/1) 60'; Pen: Prisciantelli (1/2) 16' de la Vega Mendia (1/1) 77'	Report	Try: Morgan 28' m Conbeer 65' c Con: Evans (1/2) 66'; Pen: Evans (6/6) 5', 36', 48', 51', 56', 75'	Referee: Ben Blain (Scotland)

Match 5	4 June	France	36–20	Fiji	Racecourse Stadium, Rosario
	15:30 AST (UTC–03)	Try: Taofifénua 2' c Joseph (3) 26' m, 59' c, 73' c Coly 53' c Con: Smaili (4/5) 3', 54', 60', 75'; Pen: Smaili (1/1) 15'	Report	Try: Ramasibana 36' c Waqaninavatu 66' c Con: Muntz (2/2) 39', 68'; Pen: Muntz (2/2) 5', 13'	Referee: Nika Amashukeli (Georgia)

Match 10	8 June	Argentina	41–14	Fiji	Club De Rugby Ateneo Inmaculada, Santa Fe
	13:00 AST (UTC–03)	Try: De La Vega Mendia 8' m Mendy 14' m Pedemonte 40' m Isgro Alastra 58' m Gurovich 64' c Gallo 67' c Penalty try 80+2'; Con: De La Vega Mendia (2/6) 64', 68'	Report	Try: Waqa 43' c Loaloa 70' c Con: Kuruvoli (2/2) 44', 71'	Referee: Andrea Piardi (Italy)

Match 9	8 June	France	32–13	Wales	Racecourse Stadium, Rosario
	13:00 AST (UTC–03)	Try: Carbonel 22' c Pinto 47' m Lebel 65' c Delbouis 80' c Con: Carbonel (3/4) 23', 66', 80'; Pen: Carbonel (2/2) 14', 55'	Report	Try: Lewis (2) 5' m, 73' m Pen: Evans (1/1) 25'	Referee: Rasta Rasivhenge (South Africa)

Match 16	12 June	Wales	44–28	Fiji	Club De Rugby Ateneo Inmaculada, Santa Fe
	13:00 AST (UTC–03)	Try: Reffell 4' m Buckland 12' c Lewis 36' c Lake 54' c Warren 67' c Davies 71' m Con: Evans (4/6) 13', 37', 55', 68'; Pen: Evans (2/2) 35', 79'	Report	Try: Ramasibana 8' c Soqonawasaloa 17' c Rasaku (2) 48' c, 56' c Con: Kuruvoli (4/4) 9', 18', 49', 57'	Referee: Pali Deluca (Argentina)

Match 15	12 June	France	26–47	Argentina	Racecourse Stadium, Rosario
	13:00 AST (UTC–03)	Try: Delord 27' c Joseph 43' c Taofifénua 52' c Lebel 75' m Con: Carbonel (3/4) 28', 44', 53'	Report	Try: Gallo 10' c Garcia 12' c Gonzalez Samso 20' c Dimcheff 40' c Castro Callado 69' c Con: De La Vega Mendia (4/4) 11', 13', 21', 40+1'; Roger Farias (1/1) 70'; Pen: De La Vega Mendia (3/3) 2', 24', 48'; Roger Farias (1/1) 61'	Referee: Christophe Ridley (England)

=== Pool B ===
Team	Pld	W	D	L	PF	PA	−/+	TF	TA	BP	Pts
Australia	3	2	0	1	114	85	+29	16	12	3	11
Ireland	3	2	0	1	97	85	+12	13	11	2	10
England	3	2	0	1	106	98	+8	14	14	1	9
Italy	3	0	0	3	49	98	−49	7	13	1	1

Match 2	4 June	Australia	36–12	Italy	Club De Rugby Ateneo Inmaculada, Santa Fe
	10:30 AST (UTC–03)	Try: Harris 7' c Lonergan (2) 40' c, 62' c Reilly 57' m Lolesio 66' c Con: Harrison (4/5) 7', 40', 63', 67'; Pen: Harrison (1/1) 18'	Report	Try: Taddia 76' c Trulla 80' m Con: Da Re (1/2) 77'	Referee: Pablo Deluca (Argentina)

Match 6	4 June	England	26–42	Ireland	Club De Rugby Ateneo Inmaculada, Santa Fe
	15:30 AST (UTC–03)	Try: Sleightholme (2) 9' c, 46' m Seabrook 53' m Con: Vunipola (1/2) 10'; Pen: Vunipola (3/3) 3', 26', 43'	Report	Try: Flannery 12' c Moore 27' c McCann (2) 51' c, 60' c Healy 67' c Hodnett 75' c Con: Flannery (2/2) 12', 28'; Healy (4/4) 52', 61', 68', 76	Referee: Damon Murphy (Australia)

Match 8	8 June	Australia	45–17	Ireland	Club De Rugby Ateneo Inmaculada, Santa Fe
	10:30 AST (UTC–03)	Try: Tui 24' c Lucas 63' c Nawaqanitawase 65' c Frost (2) 67' c, 79' c Harrison 77' c Con: Harrison (6/6) 26', 64', 66', 68', 78', 80'; Pen: Harrison (1/3) 5'	Report	Try: Casey 36' c Moore 57' c Con: Flannery (1/1) 37'; Healy (1/1) 58'; Pen: Flannery (1/1) 55'	Referee: Christophe Ridley (England)

Match 12	8 June	England	24–23	Italy	Club De Rugby Ateneo Inmaculada, Santa Fe
	15:30 AST (UTC–03)	Try: Coles 29' c Kenny 56' c Capstick 64' c Con: Hodge (3/3) 29', 57', 66'; Pen: Hodge (1/1) 74'	Report	Try: Lai 44' m Capuozzo 49' m Garbisi 60' c Con: Garbisi (1/1) 61'; Pen: Da Re (2/2) 10', 38'	Referee: James Doleman (New Zealand)

Match 14	12 June	Italy	14–38	Ireland	Club De Rugby Ateneo Inmaculada, Santa Fe
	10:30 AST (UTC–03)	Try: Fusco 40+4' c Penalty try 41' c Con: Garbisi (1/1) 40+5'	Report	Try: Milne 6' c Foley 14' c Allison 32' c Russell 36' c Baird 54' c Con: Healy (5/5) 7', 15', 33', 37', 55'; Pen: Healy (1/1) 11'	Referee: Rasta Rasivhenge (South Africa)

Match 18	12 June	England	56–33	Australia	Club De Rugby Ateneo Inmaculada, Santa Fe
	15:30 AST (UTC–03)	Try: Dingwall 4' c Sleightholme 8' c Hill (2) 20' c, 22' c De Glanville 31' c Hinkley 38' c Vunipola 50' c Willis 62' c Con: Hodge (8/8) 5', 9', 21', 23', 32', 39', 51', 63'	Report	Try: Lolesio 10' c Lucas 15' m Harris 53' c McReight 70' c Tizzano 77' c Con: Harrison (2/3) 11', 54'; McDonald (2/2) 71', 78'	Referee: Craig Evans (Wales)

=== Pool C ===
Team	Pld	W	D	L	PF	PA	−/+	TF	TA	BP	Pts
South Africa	3	3	0	0	116	56	+60	16	8	2	14
New Zealand	3	2	0	1	114	71	+43	17	8	2	10
Georgia	3	1	0	2	50	105	−55	6	17	0	4
Scotland	3	0	0	3	64	112	−48	10	16	2	2

Match 1	4 June	South Africa	43–19	Scotland	Racecourse Stadium, Rosario
	10:30 AST (UTC–03)	Try: Horn 18' c Hendrikse (2) 37' c, 50' m Van der Mescht 68' c Nohamba 70' c Dube 80' c Con: Hendrikse (3/4) 19', 37', 68'; Nohamba (2/2) 71', 80'; Pen: Hendrikse (1/3) 10'	Report	Try: Walker 16' m Penalty try 40'; Anderson 63' c Con: Thompson (1/2) 64'	Referee: Craig Evans (Wales)

Match 4	4 June	New Zealand	45–13	Georgia	Club De Rugby Ateneo Inmaculada, Santa Fe
	13:00 AST (UTC–03)	Try: Plumtree 14' c Herbert 17' m McLeod 36' c Faingaanuku 53' m Tupaea 62' c Dyer 72' c Mua 80' c Con: Reihana (5/7) 15', 37', 63', 72', 80'	Report	Try: Jincharadze 44' c Con: Gusharashvili (1/1) 45'; Pen: Abzhandadze (2/2) 7', 27'	Referee: Andrea Piardi (Italy)

Match 7	8 June	South Africa	48–20	Georgia	Racecourse Stadium, Rosario
	10:30 AST (UTC–03)	Try: Richardson (2) 10' c, 63' c Ntlabakanye 36' c Mbatha 40' c Pretorius 48' m Abrahams 58' m Davids 77' m Coetzer 79' m Con: Hendrikse (3/3) 11', 37', 40'; Nohamba (1/3) 64'	Report	Try: Lashkhi (2) 26' m, 54' m Tchitchinadze 80' c Con: Abzhandadze (1/3) 80'; Pen: Abzhandadze (1/2) 43'	Referee: Ben Blain (Scotland)

Match 11	8 June	New Zealand	52–33	Scotland	Racecourse Stadium, Rosario
	15:30 AST (UTC–03)	Try: Uluilakepa 7' c Gregory 13' c Lalomilo (2) 24' c, 53' m Tupaea 27' m Williams 59' c Norris 62' c Plumtree 80' c Con: Burke (6/8) 8', 14', 25', 59', 63', 80'	Report	Try: McCallum 29' m Smith (2) 33' c, 44' c Ashman 66' c Blain 71' c Con: Chamberlain (2/3) 34', 46'; Thompson (2/2) 67', 71'	Referee: Nika Amashukeli (Georgia)

Match 13	12 June	Georgia	17–12	Scotland	Racecourse Stadium, Rosario
	10:30 AST (UTC–03)	Try: Abzhandadze 56' c Nioradze 73' c Con: Abzhandadze (2/2) 57', 74'; Pen: Abzhandadze (1/1) 46'	Report	Try: Ashman (2) 4' c, 52' m Con: Thompson (1/2) 5'	Referee: James Doleman (New Zealand)

Match 17	12 June	South Africa	25–17	New Zealand	Racecourse Stadium, Rosario
	15:30 AST (UTC–03)	Try: Isaacs 7' m Van der Mescht 18' m Con: Hendrikse (0/2); Pen: Hendrikse (3/3) 15', 38', 40'; Nohamba (2/2) 71', 78'	Report	Try: penalty try 44'; Lalomilo 74' c Con: Burke (1/1) 75'; Pen: Burke (1/1) 34	Referee: Damon Murphy (Australia)

=== Pool stage standings ===
Seedings for the knockout stage based on results from the pool stage:

Pos	Team	Pool	Pld	−/+	Pts
Finals
1	South Africa	C	3	+60	14
2	Argentina	A	3	+43	11
3	Australia	B	3	+29	11
4	France	A	3	+14	11
5–8th place play-offs
5	New Zealand	C	3	+43	10
6	Ireland	B	3	+12	10
7	England	B	3	+8	9
8	Wales	A	3	+2	9
9–12th place play-offs
9	Georgia	C	3	−55	4
10	Scotland	C	3	−48	2
11	Italy	B	3	−49	1
12	Fiji	A	3	–59	1

== Knockout stage ==
=== 9–12th place play-offs ===
Semi-finals
17 June – 10:30 – Old Resian Club, Rosario
Scotland	19
Italy	26
17 June – 13:00 – Old Resian Club, Rosario
Georgia	12
Fiji	8

9th place
22 June – 13:00 – Old Resian Club, Rosario
Italy	29
Georgia	17
11th place
22 June – 10:30 – Old Resian Club, Rosario
Scotland	34
Fiji	59

==== Semi-finals ====
Match 19	17 June	Scotland	19–26	Italy	Old Resian Club, Rosario
	10:30 AST (UTC–03)		Report

Match 20	17 June	Georgia	12–8	Fiji	Old Resian Club, Rosario
	13:00 AST (UTC–03)		Report

==== 11th place ====
Match 25	22 June	Scotland	34–59	Fiji	Old Resian Club, Rosario
	10:30 AST (UTC–03)		Report

==== 9th place ====
Match 26	22 June	Italy	29–17	Georgia	Old Resian Club, Rosario
	15:30 AST (UTC–03)		Report

=== 5–8th place play-offs ===
Semi-finals
17 June – 10:30 – Racecourse Stadium, Rosario
New Zealand	7
Wales	8
17 June – 15:30 – Old Resian Club, Rosario
Ireland	23
England	30

5th place
22 June – 10:30 – Racecourse Stadium, Rosario
Wales	26
England	45
7th place
22 June – 15:30 – Old Resian Club, Rosario
New Zealand	40
Ireland	17

==== Semi-finals ====
Match 22	17 June	New Zealand	7–8	Wales	Racecourse Stadium, Rosario
	10:30 AST (UTC–03)		Report

Match 21	17 June	Ireland	23–30	England	Old Resian Club, Rosario
	15:30 AST (UTC–03)		Report

==== 7th place ====
Match 27	22 June	New Zealand	40–17	Ireland	Old Resian Club, Rosario
	13:00 AST (UTC–03)		Report

==== 5th place ====
Match 28	22 June	Wales	26–45	England	Racecourse Stadium, Rosario
	10:30 AST (UTC–03)		Report

=== Finals ===
Semi-finals
17 June – 13:00 – Racecourse Stadium, Rosario
Argentina	13
Australia	34
17 June – 15:30 – Racecourse Stadium, Rosario
South Africa	7
France	20

Final
22 June – 15:30 – Racecourse Stadium, Rosario
Australia	23
France	24
3rd place
22 June – 13:00 – Racecourse Stadium, Rosario
Argentina	16
South Africa	41

==== Semi-finals ====
Match 23	17 June	Argentina	13–34	Australia	Racecourse Stadium, Rosario
	13:00 AST (UTC–03)		Report

Match 24	17 June	South Africa	7–20	France	Racecourse Stadium, Rosario
	15:30 AST (UTC–03)		Report

==== 3rd place ====
Match 29	22 June	Argentina	16–41	South Africa	Racecourse Stadium, Rosario
	13:00 AST (UTC–03)		Report

==== Final ====
Match 30	22 June	Australia	23–24	France	Racecourse Stadium, Rosario
	15:30 AST (UTC–03)		Report

== Statistics ==
Statistics for the 2019 championship:

Most points
Pos	Player	Points
1	Josh Hodge	63
2	Louis Carbonel	52
3	Cai Evans	46
4	Joaquin De La Vega Mendia	45
5	Will Harrison	43
6	Ben Healy	41
7	Jaden Hendrikse	41
8	Ewan Ashman	35
9	Tedo Abzhandadze	34
10	Sanele Nohamba	33
11	Caleb Muntz	33
12	Paolo Garbisi	33

Most tries
Pos	Player	Tries
1	Ewan Ashman	7
2	Jordan Joseph	5
3	Jack Blain	4
3	Lachlan Lonergan	4
5	JJ van der Mescht	3
5	Kaminieli Rasaku	3
5	Lalomilo Lalomilo	3
5	Ollie Sleightholme	3
5	Ted Hill	3
5	Thaakir Abrahams	3
5	Tom Willis	3
5	Tomi Lewis	3

Most conversions
Pos	Player	Conv
1	Josh Hodge	19
2	Will Harrison	13
3	Ben Healy	12
4	Caleb Muntz	10
4	Lalomilo Lalomilo	10

Most penalty goals
Pos	Player	PG
1	Louis Carbonel	11
2	Cai Evans	10
3	Joaquin De La Vega Mendia	7
4	Josh Hodge	5
4	Tedo Abzhandadze	5

Offloads
Pos	Player	Offloads
1	Jake Flannery	11
2	Osea Waqa	10
2	Donovan Taofifenua	10
2	Alivereti Loaloa	10
5	Leicester Fainga'anuku	9
5	Jordan Joseph	9
7	Ilaisa Droasese	8
8	Alessandro Fusco	7
9	Julien Delbouis	6
9	Simione Kuruvoli	6
9	Ange Capuozzo	6
9	Fraser Dingwall	6

Clean breaks
Pos	Player	CB
1	Josh Hodge	11
2	Epeli Momo	10
2	Mateo Carreras	10
2	Mark Nawaqanitawase	10
5	Isaac Lucas	9
5	Jack Blain	9
5	Donovan Taofifenua	9
8	7 Players	8

== Final placings ==
Pos	Team	Pld	W	D	L	PF	PA	−/+	TF	TA
1	France	5	4	0	1	138	110	+28	16	13
2	Australia	5	3	0	2	171	122	+49	23	15
3	South Africa	5	4	0	1	164	92	+72	24	11
4	Argentina	5	2	0	3	142	145	–3	18	17
5–8th place play-offs
5	England	5	4	0	1	181	147	+34	23	20
6	Wales	5	3	0	2	121	137	−16	15	18
7	New Zealand	5	3	0	2	161	96	+65	24	12
8	Ireland	5	2	0	3	137	155	−18	18	20
9–12th place play-offs
9	Italy	5	2	0	3	104	134	−30	15	17
10	Georgia	5	2	0	3	79	142	−63	10	22
11	Fiji	5	1	0	4	129	167	−38	18	25
12	Scotland	5	0	0	5	117	197	−80	18	29
