= Gerswin Mouton =

Namibian rugby union player

- Full name: Gerswin Mouton
- Born: 12 September 1999 (age 27) Rehoboth, Namibia
- Height: 183 cm (6 ft 0 in)
- Weight: 95 kg (209 lb; 14 st 13 lb)
- School: Windhoek Afrikaanse Privaatskool
- University: University of the Witwatersrand
- Notable relative: Deon Mouton (father)

Rugby union career
- Position: Winger/Centre/Fullback
- Current team: FC Grenoble
Youth career
- 2018-2020: Blue Bulls
Senior career
Years	Team	Apps	(Points)
2020-2023	FNB Wits	??	(??)
2023	Tel Aviv Heat	4	(0)
2024-	FC Grenoble	18	(55)
- Correct as of 29 March 2024
International career
Years	Team	Apps	(Points)
2018	Namibia under-20	4	(20)
2022-	Namibia	8	(15)
- Correct as of 29 March 2024

Gerswin Mouton (born 16 December 1999) is a Namibian rugby union player who plays on the wing for French Pro D2 side FC Grenoble.

== Club career ==
=== Youth ===
He began playing rugby at Origo Primary School before being offered a scholarship to Windhoek Afrikaanse Privaatskool. He joined the Blue Bulls in 2018, helping the under-19 side to a runners up finish in the 2018 Under-19 Provincial Championship. He featured for the under-21 side 12 times scoring 5 tries in their victorious 2019 Under-21 Provincial Championship season.

=== Senior ===
He joined Varsity Rugby side FNB Wits in 2020, before leaving to join Israeli Rugby Europe Super Cup side Tel Aviv Heat in 2023. Making 4 appearances for the side including starting on the wing in the 2023 Rugby Europe Super Cup final, Tel Aviv Heat losing 27–17.

== International career ==
Mouton played for Namibia under-16 and under-18 before playing for Namibia under-20 in the 2018 World Rugby Under 20 Trophy, Namibia finishing the tournament in 4th place behind Portugal.

He played in Namibia's successful 2022 Africa Cup campaign before being named in the squad for the 2023 Rugby World Cup in France. Mouton starting in all of Namibia's matches, scoring twice.

== Honours ==
=== Blue Bulls ===
- Under-19 Provincial Championship: 2018 (champions)
- Under-21 Provincial Championship: 2019 (champions)

=== Namibia ===
- Rugby Africa Cup: 2022 (champions)

=== Tel Aviv Heat ===
- Rugby Europe Super Cup: 2023 (runners up)
