= 2019 Under-20 Provincial Championship =

- Countries: South Africa
- Date: 13 July – 30 August 2019
- Champions: Griffons U20
- Runners-up: Eastern Province U20
- Matches played: 21
- Tries scored: 204 (average 9.7 per match)
- Top point scorer: Johan Lombaard (Eastern Province U20) and Franco Smith (Griffons U20, 72)
- Top try scorer: Curtley Deysel (Eastern Province U20, 10)

The 2019 Under-20 Provincial Championship was the 2019 edition of the Under-20 Provincial Championship, an annual national Under-20 rugby union competition held in South Africa, and was contested from 13 July to 30 August 2019.

== Competition rules and information ==
There were nine participating teams in the 2019 Under-20 Provincial Championship. The teams were divided into three sections, with each team playing the other two teams in their section twice during the regular season, once at home and once away. Teams received four points for a win and two points for a draw. Bonus points were awarded to teams that scored four or more tries in a game, as well as to teams that lost a match by seven points or less. Teams were ranked by log points, then points difference (points scored less points conceded).

The top four teams in the pool stage — the three section winners, plus the runner-up with the best record — qualified for the semi-finals, where the section winner with the best record hosted the best runner-up, and the section winner with the second-best record hosted the section winner with the third-best record. The two semi-final winners played in the final, played as a curtain-raiser for the 2019 Currie Cup First Division final.

== Teams ==
The teams that competed in the 2019 Under-20 Provincial Championship are:

Location of teams in the 2019 Under-20 Provincial Championship

2019 Under-20 Provincial Championship teams
North Section
Falcons U20
Limpopo Blue Bulls U20
Pumas U20
Central Section
Griffons U20
Griquas U20
Leopards U20
Coastal Section
Boland U20
Eastern Province U20
SWD U20

== Regular season ==
=== North Section ===
==== Standings ====
The final standings in the 2019 Under-20 Provincial Championship North Section were:

2019 Under-20 Provincial Championship North Section standings
Pos	Team	P	W	D	L	PF	PA	PD	TF	TA	TB	LB	Pts
1	Pumas U20	4	4	0	0	143	96	+47	19	12	3	0	19
2	Limpopo Blue Bulls U20	4	1	0	3	147	128	+19	20	15	2	2	8
3	Falcons U20	4	1	0	3	105	171	−66	15	27	3	1	8

==== Round-by-round ====
The table below shows each team's progression throughout the season. For each round, each team's cumulative points total is shown with the overall log position in brackets.

Team Progression
Team	R1	R2	R3	R4	R5	R6	SF	F
Pumas U20	5 (1st)	5 (2nd)	10 (1st)	14 (1st)	14 (1st)	19 (1st)	Lost	—
Limpopo Blue Bulls U20	0 (3rd)	5 (1st)	5 (2nd)	6 (2nd)	8 (2nd)	8 (2nd)	—	—
Falcons U20	0 (2nd)	1 (3rd)	1 (3rd)	1 (3rd)	6 (3rd)	8 (3rd)	—	—
Key:	win	draw	loss	bye				

==== Matches ====
The following matches were played in the 2019 Under-20 Provincial Championship North Section:

12 July 2019	Limpopo Blue Bulls U20	30–38	Pumas U20	Loftus Versfeld B, Pretoria
16:00	Try: Kevin Slow; Ronaldo Daniels; Zihan Coetzee; Con: Ronaldo Daniels (3); Pen: Ronaldo Daniels (3)	Scoreboard	Try: Calvin Clack; Darryl Wellman; Dumisani Hlungwane; Waldo Snyman; Con: Riekert Barnard (3); Pen: Riekert Barnard (4)	Referee: Mpho Matsaung

19 July 2019	Limpopo Blue Bulls U20	61–29	Falcons U20	Loftus Versfeld, Pretoria
17:00	Try: Nathan Solomons (3); Zihan Coetzee; Ronaldo Isaacs; Enrique Edwardo Oranje; Luaan Pieterse; Justice Nkombua; Jared Manus; Con: Brandon Melamed (8)	Scoreboard	Try: Diline Slabbert; Anthony Buys; Austin van Heerden (2); Mpho Ntsane; Con: Franna Myburgh (2)	Referee: Jabian Jeftha

27 July 2019	Falcons U20	14–50	Pumas U20	Bosman Stadium, Brakpan
13:00	Try: Hugo Scott; Danny Pautz; Con: Jayden Boshoff; Austin van Heerden	Scoreboard	Try: Cameron Pullen; Riekert Barnard; Dumisani Hlungwane; Kamogelo Matloa; Lee Enslin; Jenaldo Olivier (3); Con: Riekert Barnard (5)	Referee: Jaco Kotze

3 August 2019	Pumas U20	26–25	Limpopo Blue Bulls U20	Mbombela Stadium, Mbombela
12:30	Try: Darryl Wellman; Maxwell Osborne; Con: Riekert Barnard (2); Pen: Riekert Barnard (4)	Scoreboard	Try: Renaldo Kuppen; Zihan Coetzee; Kevin Slow; Con: Brandon Melamed (2); Pen: Brandon Melamed; Drop: Brandon Melamed	Referee: Stephan Geldenhuys

9 August 2019	Falcons U20	35–31	Limpopo Blue Bulls U20	Bosman Stadium, Brakpan
11:00	Try: Simphiwe Yika; Hugo Scott; Uzain Fait; Austin van Heerden; Con: Austin van Heerden (3); Pen: Austin van Heerden (3)	Scoreboard	Try: Brandon Melamed (2); Ewan Botha; Werner Schoeman; Willy Heugh; Con: Brandon Melamed (3)	Referee: Phumzile Mbewu

17 August 2019	Pumas U20	29–27	Falcons U20	Mbombela Stadium, Mbombela
11:30	Try: Dylon Senger; Quintion October; Darryl Wellman (2); Waldo Snyman; Con: Riekert Barnard (2)	Scoreboard	Try: Hugo Scott (2); PJ de Beer; Arno Mostert; Con: JP Pieterse (2); Pen: JP Pieterse	Referee: Eduan Nel

=== Central Section ===
==== Standings ====
The final standings in the 2019 Under-20 Provincial Championship Central Section were:

2019 Under-20 Provincial Championship Central Section standings
Pos	Team	P	W	D	L	PF	PA	PD	TF	TA	TB	LB	Pts
1	Griffons U20	4	4	0	0	178	106	+72	28	14	4	0	20
2	Leopards U20	4	2	0	2	137	121	+16	20	19	2	1	11
3	Griquas U20	4	0	0	4	108	196	−88	15	30	2	2	4

==== Round-by-round ====
The table below shows each team's progression throughout the season. For each round, each team's cumulative points total is shown with the overall log position in brackets.

Team Progression
Team	R1	R2	R3	R4	R5	R6	SF	F
Griffons U20	0 (3rd)	5 (2nd)	10 (1st)	10 (2nd)	15 (1st)	20 (1st)	Won	
Leopards U20	5 (1st)	5 (1st)	6 (2nd)	11 (1st)	11 (2nd)	11 (2nd)	—	—
Griquas U20	2 (2nd)	4 (3rd)	4 (3rd)	4 (3rd)	4 (3rd)	4 (3rd)	—	—
Key:	win	draw	loss	bye				

==== Matches ====
The following matches were played in the 2019 Under-20 Provincial Championship Central Section:

13 July 2019	Leopards U20	36–30	Griquas U20	Olën Park, Potchefstroom
12:00	Try: Gerald Pulane; Philip Philip John; Anelka Barends; Ricardo Liebenberg; Meyer Kriel (2); Con: Zian de Jager (2); Zinedine Robinson	Scoreboard	Try: Hanco von Abo; Liso Makabeni; Craig Ockhuis; Chandre Ludick; Con: Zielie Robertson (2); Pen: Zielie Robertson (2)	Referee: Jaco Kotze

19 July 2019	Griquas U20	36–38	Griffons U20	Tafel Lager Park, Kimberley
14:30	Try: Godwill Romain; Chandre Ludick; Payi Sooi; Charlie Louw (2); Con: Zielie Robertson (4); Pen: Zielie Robertson	Scoreboard	Try: Brandon Botha; Schalk Bezuidenhout; Cham Zondeki; Franco Smith; Martin Austen; Tiaan Fourie; Con: Eben van Niekerk (4)	Referee: Johre Botha

26 July 2019	Griffons U20	26–22	Leopards U20	HT Pelatona Projects Stadium, Welkom
15:00	Try: Brandon Botha; Schalk Bezuidenhout; Ulrich Stander; Jhaques Thyssen; Con: Franco Smith (3)	Scoreboard	Try: Anelka Barends (2); Meyer Kriel; Con: Zian de Jager; Zinedine Robinson; Pen: Zinedine Robinson	Referee: Mpho Matsaung

3 August 2019	Griquas U20	15–58	Leopards U20	Tafel Lager Park, Kimberley
16:00	Try: George Olivier; Ranaldo Appollis; Rowie Malgas	Scoreboard	Try: Keenan Twigg; Anelka Barends; Meyer Kriel (2); Zinedine Robinson (2); Gerald Pulane; Jaco Gerber; Con: Zinedine Robinson (6); Pen: Zinedine Robinson (2)	Referee: Johre Botha

10 August 2019	Griffons U20	64–27	Griquas U20	HT Pelatona Projects Stadium, Welkom
13:00	Try: Dillon Minnaar; Schalk Bezuidenhout; Ulrich Stander (2); Max Williamson; Franco Smith; Aaron Seth Larue (2); Luyanda Mkhize; Ayabonga Matroos; Con: Franco Smith (7)	Scoreboard	Try: Rizaa Collins; Zielie Robertson; Godwill Romain; Con: Zielie Robertson (3); Pen: Zielie Robertson (2)	Referee: Eduan Nel

17 August 2019	Leopards U20	21–50	Griffons U20	Olën Park, Potchefstroom
11:00	Try: Zian de Jager; Keenan Twigg (2); Con: Zian de Jager (3)	Scoreboard	Try: Schalk Bezuidenhout; Max Williamson; Jan Strydom; Aaron Seth Larue (2); Luyanda Mkhize; Franco Smith (2); Con: Jan Strydom (4); Franco Smith	Referee: Bulelani Naka

=== Coastal Section ===
==== Standings ====
The final standings in the 2019 Under-20 Provincial Championship Coastal Section were:

2019 Under-20 Provincial Championship Coastal Section standings
Pos	Team	P	W	D	L	PF	PA	PD	TF	TA	TB	LB	Pts
1	Eastern Province U20	4	4	0	0	187	57	+130	28	8	3	0	19
2	Boland U20	4	2	0	2	163	110	+53	26	14	2	1	11
3	SWD U20	4	0	0	4	53	236	−183	6	38	0	0	0

==== Round-by-round ====
The table below shows each team's progression throughout the season. For each round, each team's cumulative points total is shown with the overall log position in brackets.

Team Progression
Team	R1	R2	R3	R4	R5	R6	SF	F
Eastern Province U20	5 (1st)	5 (1st)	10 (1st)	14 (1st)	14 (1st)	19 (1st)	Won	
Boland U20	0 (3rd)	5 (2nd)	5 (2nd)	6 (2nd)	11 (2nd)	11 (2nd)	Lost	—
SWD U20	0 (2nd)	0 (3rd)	0 (3rd)	0 (3rd)	0 (3rd)	0 (3rd)	—	—
Key:	win	draw	loss	bye				

==== Matches ====
The following matches were played in the 2019 Under-20 Provincial Championship Coastal Section:

13 July 2019	Eastern Province U20	53–20	Boland U20	Wolfson Stadium, KwaZakele
13:00	Try: Bevan Prinsloo (2); Curtley Deysel (3); Johan Lombaard; Lennox Holster; Ruan Jonker; Con: Johan Lombaard (5); Pen: Johan Lombaard	Scoreboard	Try: Xavier Lesch; Marco Jones; Maxwill van Louw; Con: Lloyd April; Pen: Maxwell Klaasen	Referee: Vusi Msibi

20 July 2019	Boland U20	71–11	SWD U20	Caledon Sports Grounds, Caledon
12:15	Try: Andries de Kock; Stone Cloete; Marco Jones; Jevan August (2); Lundi Msenge (5); Mac-John Daniels; Con: Lloyd April (8)	Scoreboard	Try: Curtley Scheepers; Pen: Roshwin Abrahams (2)	Referee: Bulelani Naka

26 July 2019	SWD U20	13–36	Eastern Province U20	Outeniqua Park, George
16:30	Try: Curtley Scheepers; Con: Sergio Stalmeester; Pen: Sergio Stalmeester (2)	Scoreboard	Try: Ruan Jonker; Dirkie Ferreira; Bevan Prinsloo (2); Curtley Deysel; Duane Hanekom; Con: Johan Lombaard (3)	Referee: Bulelani Naka

3 August 2019	Boland U20	17–24	Eastern Province U20	Esselen Park, Worcester
10:25	Try: Mikyle Hanse; Boyka Lewis; Mac-John Daniels; Con: Lloyd April	Scoreboard	Try: Johan Lombaard; Duane Hanekom; Con: Johan Lombaard; Pen: Johan Lombaard (4)	Referee: Christopher Allison

9 August 2019	SWD U20	22–55	Boland U20	Outeniqua Park, George
16:30	Try: Roshwin Abrahams; Justin Lando; Dehovine Johannes; Con: Roshwin Abrahams; Georgen Kiewiet; Pen: Roshwin Abrahams	Scoreboard	Try: Boyka Lewis (3); Maxwill van Louw (2); Lundi Msenge; Mac-John Daniels; Bjorkan Hendricks (2); Con: Lloyd April (4); Burton Booysen	Referee: Mpho Matsaung

17 August 2019	Eastern Province U20	74–7	SWD U20	WJ de Wet Stadium, Despatch
14:00	Try: Dirkie Ferreira (2); Bevan Prinsloo; Johan Lombaard; Curtley Deysel (3); Lennox Holster; Jean-Pierre Greyling; Matthew Olivera; Sachin Toring; Kevin Slow; Con: Johan Lombaard (3); Sachin Toring; Dylan Le Roux (3)	Scoreboard	Try: Roshwin Abrahams; Con: Roshwin Abrahams	Referee: Jabian Jeftha

== Play-offs ==
The three section winners qualified for the play-offs, ranked by their record in the regular season. They were joined by the runner-up with the best record.

2019 Under-20 Provincial Championship section winner standings
Pos	Team	P	W	D	L	PF	PA	PD	TF	TA	TB	LB	Pts
1	Griffons U20	4	4	0	0	178	106	+72	28	14	4	0	20
2	Eastern Province U20	4	4	0	0	187	57	+130	28	8	3	0	19
3	Pumas U20	4	4	0	0	143	96	+47	19	12	3	0	19

2019 Under-20 Provincial Championship second-placed team standings
Pos	Team	P	W	D	L	PF	PA	PD	TF	TA	TB	LB	Pts
1	Boland U20	4	2	0	2	163	110	+53	26	14	2	1	11
2	Leopards U20	4	2	0	2	137	121	+16	20	19	2	1	11
3	Limpopo Blue Bulls U20	4	1	0	3	147	128	+19	20	15	2	2	8

=== Semi-finals ===
24 August 2019	Griffons U20	51–33	Boland U20	HT Pelatona Projects Stadium, Welkom
13:00	Try: Brandon Botha; Max Williamson (2); Jan Strydom; Franco Smith; Martin Austen; Tiaan Fourie; Con: Jan Strydom (4); Franco Smith; Pen: Franco Smith (2)	Scoreboard	Try: Jevan August; Lloyd April; Mikyle Hanse; Bjorkan Hendricks; Con: Lloyd April (2); Pen: Lloyd April (2); Drop: Lloyd April	Referee: Griffin Colby

24 August 2019	Eastern Province U20	31–26	Pumas U20	WJ de Wet Stadium, Despatch
14:00	Try: Bevan Prinsloo; Lennox Holster; Sachin Toring; Con: Johan Lombaard (2); Pen: Johan Lombaard (4)	Scoreboard	Try: Jason Cornelius; Eben Odendal; Giovan Snyman; Lee Enslin; Con: Riekert Barnard (3)	Referee: Vusi Msibi

=== Final ===
30 August 2019	Griffons U20	37–29	Eastern Province U20	Fanie du Toit Sport Ground, Potchefstroom
15:30	Try: Franco Smith 7'; Schalk Bezuidenhout 11'; Jan Strydom 13'; Max Williamson 37'; Jhaques Thyssen 64'; Con: Franco Smith 11', 14', 37'; Pen: Franco Smith 4', 56'	Scoreboard	Try: Curtley Deysel 23', 40', 42'; Lennox Holster 57'; Con: Johan Lombaard 24'; Sachin Toring 43', 58'; Pen: Matthew Olivera 49'	Referee: Vusi Msibi

== Honours ==
The honour roll for the 2019 Under-20 Provincial Championship was:

2019 Under-20 Provincial Championship
Champions:	Griffons U20
Top points scorers:	Johan Lombaard, Eastern Province U20 (72); Franco Smith, Griffons U20 (72)
Top try scorer:	Curtley Deysel, Eastern Province U20 (10)

== Referees ==
The following referees officiated matches in the 2019 Under-20 Provincial Championship:

2019 Under-20 Provincial Championship referees
Christopher Allison • Johre Botha • Griffin Colby • Stephan Geldenhuys • Jabian Jeftha • Jaco Kotze • Mpho Matsaung • Phumzile Mbewu • Vusi Msibi • Bulelani Naka • Eduan Nel

== See also ==
- 2019 Currie Cup Premier Division
- 2019 Currie Cup First Division
- 2019 Rugby Challenge
- 2019 Under-21 Provincial Championship
