= 2018 Under-19 Provincial Championship =

- Countries: South Africa
- Date: 6 July – 27 October 2018
- Champions: Sharks U19
- Runners-up: Blue Bulls U19
- Matches played: 45
- Tries scored: 439 (average 9.8 per match)
- Top point scorer: Sanele Nohamba, Sharks U19 (152)
- Top try scorer: Caleb Dingaan, Sharks U19; Asanda Sihle Kunene, Sharks U19 (10)

The 2018 Under-19 Provincial Championship was the 2018 edition of the Under-19 Provincial Championship, an annual national Under-19 rugby union competition held in South Africa, and was contested from 6 July to 27 October 2018.

The competition was won by Sharks U19, who beat Blue Bulls U19 40–27 in the final played on 27 October 2018.

== Competition rules and information ==
There was seven participating teams in the 2018 Under-19 Provincial Championship. They played each other twice during the pool stage, once at home and once away. Teams receive four points for a win and two points for a draw. Bonus points were awarded to teams that scored four or more tries in a game, as well as to teams that lost a match by seven points or less. Teams were ranked by log points, then points difference (points scored less points conceded).

The top four teams in the pool stage qualified for the semifinals, which were followed by a final.

== Teams ==
The teams that played in the 2018 Under-19 Provincial Championship are:

Location of teams in the 2018 Under-19 Provincial Championship

2018 Under-19 Provincial Championship teams
Team name	Stadium
Blue Bulls U19	Loftus Versfeld, Pretoria
Eastern Province U19	Nelson Mandela Bay Stadium, Port Elizabeth
Free State U19	Free State Stadium, Bloemfontein
Golden Lions U19	Ellis Park Stadium, Johannesburg
Leopards U19	Fanie du Toit Sport Ground, Potchefstroom
Sharks U19	Kings Park Stadium, Durban
Western Province U19	Newlands Stadium, Cape Town

== Pool stage ==
=== Standings ===
2018 Under-19 Provincial Championship log
Pos	Team	P	W	D	L	PF	PA	PD	TF	TA	TB	LB	Pts
1	Sharks U19	12	12	0	0	590	203	+387	84	28	9	0	57
2	Blue Bulls U19	12	8	1	3	464	266	+198	68	33	8	2	44
3	Golden Lions U19	12	7	1	4	429	307	+122	59	41	7	1	38
4	Western Province U19	12	6	0	6	507	354	+153	74	52	11	2	37
5	Free State U19	12	5	0	7	399	384	+15	63	57	7	0	27
6	Leopards U19	12	3	0	9	337	504	−167	48	74	7	2	21
7	Eastern Province U19	12	0	0	12	143	851	−708	19	130	1	1	2
Final standings.

Legend and competition rules
Legend:
Qualified for the semifinals.	P = Games played, W = Games won, D = Games drawn, L = Games lost, PF = Points for, PA = Points against, PD = Points difference, TF = Tries for, TA = Tries against, TB = Try bonus points, LB = Losing bonus points, Pts = Log points
Competition rules:
Qualification: The top four teams qualified for the semifinals. Points breakdown: * 4 points for a win * 2 points for a draw * 1 bonus point for a loss by seven points or less * 1 bonus point for scoring four or more tries in a match

=== Matches ===
==== Round one ====
6 July 2018	Golden Lions U19	104–12	Eastern Province U19	Ellis Park Stadium, Johannesburg
14:00	Try: Dameon Venter; Keagan Glade; Cristen van Niekerk; Mark Snyman (2); Mandisi Owethu Mthiyane; Janco van Heyningen (3); Yanga Hlalu; Edmund Ludick (2); David Cary; Kennedy Mpeku; Tiaan Drotskie; Asenathi Ntlabakanye; Con: Christian Humphries (9); Jonathan Joshua Viljoen (3)	Scoreboard	Try: Sachin Toring; Kevin Slow; Con: Rodwill Baatjies	Referee: Christopher Allison

7 July 2018	Free State U19	48–19	Leopards U19	Shimla Park, Bloemfontein
13:00	Try: Janus Venter; Johan Wilken; Ruwald van der Merwe; Jacques van Biljon; Philppus Johannes Krugell (2); James Mollentze; Ayabonga Matroos; Con: James Mollentze (4)	Scoreboard	Try: Kagiso Woodbrigde; Tristan Oosthuizen; AJ Meyer; Con: Tristan Oosthuizen (2)	Referee: Griffin Colby

7 July 2018	Western Province U19	27–31	Blue Bulls U19	Newlands Stadium, Cape Town
14:00	Try: Dian Bleuler; Ian Kitwanga; Christopher Schreuder; Henro Meyer; Con: Christopher Schreuder (2); Pen: Christopher Schreuder	Scoreboard	Try: Vaughen Isaacs; Jay Cee Nel; Andrew Kota (2); Wiehan Bezuidenhout; Con: Vaughen Isaacs (3)	Referee: Stephan Geldenhuys

Bye/s: Sharks U19

==== Round two ====
13 July 2018	Blue Bulls U19	49–12	Free State U19	Loftus Versfeld B, Pretoria
15:00	Try: Kudzwai Dube; Phillip Potgieter; Rune Lucas; Jay Cee Nel (2); Andrew Kota; Dylan Kruger; Con: Vaughen Isaacs (7)	Scoreboard	Try: James Mollentze; Cham Zondeki; Con: James Mollentze	Referee: Jaco Pretorius

14 July 2018	Leopards U19	17–32	Golden Lions U19	Fanie du Toit Sport Ground, Potchefstroom
12:30	Try: MC Janse van Rensburg; Mitchell van der Merwe; Con: Wayne Joubert (2); Pen: Wayne Joubert	Scoreboard	Try: Ziyanda Msipha; Yanga Hlalu; Kennedy Mpeku; Njabulo Mjara; Con: Christian Humphries (3); Pen: Christian Humphries (2)	Referee: Eduan Nel

14 July 2018	Eastern Province U19	0–52	Sharks U19	Nelson Mandela Bay Stadium, Port Elizabeth
15:30		Scoreboard	Try: JJ van der Mescht; Vian Andre Fourie; Phepsi Buthelezi; Sanele Nohamba; Ralph Koster; Donald Falconer; Adriaan Staples; Onke Jiba; Con: Sanele Nohamba; Boeta Chamberlain (4); Ralph Koster	Referee: Phumzile Mbewu

Bye/s: Western Province U19

==== Round three ====
20 July 2018	Sharks U19	38–29	Leopards U19	Kings Park Stadium, Durban
15:00	Try: Fezokuhle Mbatha; JJ van der Mescht (2); Donald Falconer (3); Con: Sanele Nohamba (3); Ralph Koster	Scoreboard	Try: Goose du Rand; Craivian Smith; MC Janse van Rensburg; Andries Fouche; James du Randt; Con: Wayne Joubert (2)	Referee: Vusi Msibi

21 July 2018	Golden Lions U19	29–29	Blue Bulls U19	Ellis Park Stadium, Johannesburg
12:00	Try: Dameon Venter; Yanga Hlalu; Con: Christian Humphries (2); Pen: Christian Humphries (5)	Scoreboard	Try: Rune Lucas; Sabastian Jobb; Con: Vaughen Isaacs (2); Pen: Vaughen Isaacs (5)	Referee: Divan Uys

21 July 2018	Free State U19	31–61	Western Province U19	Shimla Park, Bloemfontein
13:00	Try: Janus Venter (2); Ruwald van der Merwe; Philppus Johannes Krugell; Willem Marais; Con: James Mollentze (3)	Scoreboard	Try: Dian Bleuler; Vusile Dlepu; Christopher Schreuder; David Kriel (3); Angelo Davids; Waqar Solaan (2); Con: Christopher Schreuder (8)	Referee: Jaco Kotze

Bye/s: Eastern Province U19

==== Round four ====
27 July 2018	Blue Bulls U19	20–22	Sharks U19	Loftus Versfeld B, Pretoria
15:00	Try: Vaughen Isaacs; Andrew Kota; Con: Vaughen Isaacs (2); Pen: Vaughen Isaacs; Romeo Eksteen	Scoreboard	Try: Caleb Dingaan; Con: Sanele Nohamba; Pen: Sanele Nohamba (5)	Referee: Stephan Geldenhuys

28 July 2018	Leopards U19	54–12	Eastern Province U19	Fanie du Toit Sport Ground, Potchefstroom
11:30	Try: Beast Sangweni; Craivian Smith; Sylvester Hassien; Lohann Jahns; Mitchell van der Merwe; Heinrich Botha; Ernest Nebe; Con: Tristan Oosthuizen (4); Heinrich Botha; Pen: Tristan Oosthuizen; Heinrich Botha (2)	Scoreboard	Try: Rodwill Baatjies; Kholiwe Konza; Con: Dylan le Roux	Referee: Ricus van der Hoven

28 July 2018	Western Province U19	37–28	Golden Lions U19	City Park Stadium, Athlone
12:30	Try: Dian Bleuler; Waqar Solaan; Quan Eymann; Henro Meyer; Ruhann Greyling; Con: Christopher Schreuder (3); Pen: Christopher Schreuder (2)	Scoreboard	Try: Dameon Venter; Smittie Smit; Cal Smid; Ebot Buma; Con: Christian Humphries (4)	Referee: Aimee Barrett-Theron

Bye/s: Free State U19

==== Round five ====
3 August 2018	Golden Lions U19	19–25	Free State U19	Ellis Park Stadium, Johannesburg
14:00	Try: Dameon Venter; Tinus Combrinck; Yanga Hlalu; Con: Christian Humphries (2)	Scoreboard	Try: Philppus Johannes Krugell; James Mollentze; Cham Zondeki; Con: James Mollentze (2); Pen: James Mollentze (2)	Referee: Ruhan Meiring

3 August 2018	Sharks U19	25–23	Western Province U19	KP2, Kings Park, Durban
15:00	Try: Vian Andre Fourie; Dylan Richardson; Phepsi Buthelezi; Con: Boeta Chamberlain (2); Pen: Boeta Chamberlain (2)	Scoreboard	Try: Tonderai Chiwambutsa; Angelo Davids; Con: Christopher Schreuder (2); Pen: Christopher Schreuder (3)	Referee: Archie Sehlako

4 August 2018	Eastern Province U19	10–69	Blue Bulls U19	WJ de Wet Stadium, Despatch
12:00	Try: Jarred du Plessis; Con: Dylan le Roux; Pen: Dylan le Roux	Scoreboard	Try: Louis Meiring; Jaco Labuschagne; Mangaliso Ntimba; Luke Rossouw (2); Gerswin Mouton; Joe van Zyl; Janko Swanepoel; Phillip Potgieter (2); Lian du Toit; Con: Vaughen Isaacs; Luke Rossouw (6)	Referee: Rodney Boneparte

Bye/s: Leopards U19

==== Round six ====
10 August 2018	Western Province U19	97–15	Eastern Province U19	Hoër Landbouskool Boland, Paarl
12:30	Try: Christiaan Rossouw (3); Ian Kitwanga; Francke Horn (2); Waqar Solaan; Angelo Davids; Quan Eymann (2); Alexander Mbete; Aydon Topley; Nevaldo Fleurs; David Kriel; Tristan Leitch; Con: David Coetzer (11)	Scoreboard	Try: Landile Mlonzi; Dylan le Roux; Con: Dylan le Roux; Pen: Dylan le Roux	Referee: Vusi Msibi

10 August 2018	Blue Bulls U19	65–13	Leopards U19	Loftus Versfeld B, Pretoria
15:00	Try: Phillip Potgieter; Orateng Koikanyang; Lian du Toit; Rune Lucas (2); Sabastian Jobb; Gerswin Mouton; Llewellyn Classen; Cornel Korff; Wiehan Bezuidenhout; Con: Vaughen Isaacs (3); Luke Rossouw (3); Pen: Luke Rossouw	Scoreboard	Try: MC Janse van Rensburg; Con: Tristan Oosthuizen; Pen: Tristan Oosthuizen; Drop: Tristan Oosthuizen	Referee: Griffin Colby

11 August 2018	Free State U19	21–32	Sharks U19	CUT Stadium, Bloemfontein
13:00	Try: Elrigh Louw; Deon van Niekerk penalty try Con: James Mollentze (2)	Scoreboard	Try: Thaakir Abrahams (2); Muller du Plessis (3); Con: Boeta Chamberlain (2); Pen: Boeta Chamberlain	Referee: Jaco Kotze

Bye/s: Golden Lions U19

==== Round seven ====
17 August 2018	Sharks U19	25–10	Golden Lions U19	Moses Mabhida Stadium, Durban
16:30	Try: Donald Falconer; Onke Jiba; Asanda Sihle Kunene; Con: Sanele Nohamba (2); Pen: Sanele Nohamba (2)	Scoreboard	Try: Asenathi Ntlabakanye; Con: Christian Humphries; Pen: Christian Humphries	Referee: Archie Sehlako

18 August 2018	Leopards U19	35–58	Western Province U19	Fanie du Toit Sport Ground, Potchefstroom
11:00	Try: Ruben du Plessis; AJ Meyer; George van der Westhuizen; Heinrich Botha (2); Con: Tristan Oosthuizen (5)	Scoreboard	Try: Dian Bleuler; Marcel Theunissen; David Coetzer; Waqar Solaan; David Kriel (2); Christian Ambadiang Guetang; Quan Eymann; Ruhann Greyling; Con: David Coetzer (4); Christopher Schreuder; Pen: David Coetzer	Referee: Stephan Geldenhuys

18 August 2018	Eastern Province U19	7–61	Free State U19	DF Malherbe High School, Walmer
12:30	Try: Kholiwe Konza; Con: Dylan le Roux	Scoreboard	Try: Janus Venter; André Hanekom (3); Message Nkosi; James Mollentze; Cham Zondeki; Philppus Johannes Krugell; Hendrik Divan de Clerk; Con: James Mollentze (8)	Referee: Phumzile Mbewu

Bye/s: Blue Bulls U19

==== Round eight ====
24 August 2018	Eastern Province U19	5–66	Golden Lions U19	WJ de Wet Stadium, Despatch
12:00	Try: Janu Fourie	Scoreboard	Try: Ruben Kotze; Mark Snyman; Cal Smid; Tinus Combrinck (2); Edmund Ludick (3); Janco van Heyningen; Prince Nkabinde; Con: Christian Humphries (7); Edmund Ludick	Referee: Eduan Nel

24 August 2018	Blue Bulls U19	43–29	Western Province U19	Loftus Versfeld B, Pretoria
13:00	Try: Janko Swanepoel (2); Phillip Potgieter; Marnus Potgieter; Llewellyn Classen; Dylan Kruger; Con: Vaughen Isaacs (5); Pen: Vaughen Isaacs	Scoreboard	Try: Vusile Dlepu; Waqar Solaan; Duren Hoffman; Quan Eymann; Con: Christopher Schreuder (3); Pen: Christopher Schreuder	Referee: Phumzile Mbewu

25 August 2018	Leopards U19	40–24	Free State U19	Fanie du Toit Sport Ground, Potchefstroom
11:00	Try: Sylvester Hassien (3); Lohann Jahns; Heinrich Botha (2); Con: Tristan Oosthuizen (2); Pen: Tristan Oosthuizen; Drop: Tristan Oosthuizen	Scoreboard	Try: Jacques van Biljon; Cham Zondeki (2); Johan Wilken; Con: Marc Morrison; James Mollentze	Referee: Ricus van der Hoven

Bye/s: Sharks U19

==== Round nine ====
31 August 2018	Golden Lions U19	36–34	Leopards U19	Ellis Park Stadium, Johannesburg
12:00	Try: Cal Smid; Christian Humphries; Prince Nkabinde (2); Kennedy Mpeku; Con: Christian Humphries (4); Pen: Keagan Lailvaux	Scoreboard	Try: Andries Fouche; Sylvester Hassien (2); Chris Vermaak; Con: Tristan Oosthuizen (4); Pen: Tristan Oosthuizen (2)	Referee: Jaco Kotze

1 September 2018	Free State U19	12–50	Blue Bulls U19	Free State Stadium, Bloemfontein
10:00	Try: Janus Venter; Philppus Johannes Krugell; Con: James Mollentze	Scoreboard	Try: Phillip Potgieter; Marnus Potgieter (2); Sabastian Jobb; Andrew Kota; Romeo Eksteen; Dylan Kruger; Ruben Beytell; Con: Vaughen Isaacs (4); Stephan van der Bank	Referee: Mpho Matsaung

1 September 2018	Sharks U19	134–7	Eastern Province U19	Kings Park Stadium, Durban
11:00	Try: Fezokuhle Mbatha; Francois Klopper; Jeandre Labushagne; JJ van der Mescht (2); Sanele Nohamba; Asanda Sihle Kunene (4); Muller du Plessis; Caleb Dingaan (3); Thaakir Abrahams; Adam Mountfort; Matthew Doyle; Onke Jiba; Ralph Koster; Boeta Chamberlain; Con: Sanele Nohamba (10); Caleb Dingaan; Ralph Koster (6)	Scoreboard	Try: Dirkie Ferreira; Con: Dylan le Roux	Referee: Stuart Berry

Bye/s: Western Province U19

==== Round ten ====
7 September 2018	Blue Bulls U19	10–11	Golden Lions U19	Loftus Versfeld B, Pretoria
13:00	Try: Rune Lucas; James Combrinck	Scoreboard	Try: David Cary; Pen: Christian Humphries (2)	Referee: Jaco Pretorius

8 September 2018	Leopards U19	7–90	Sharks U19	Fanie du Toit Sport Ground, Potchefstroom
11:00	Try: John Keevy; Con: Tristan Oosthuizen	Scoreboard	Try: Fezokuhle Mbatha (4); Francois Klopper (2); Dylan Richardson; Phepsi Buthelezi (2); Asanda Sihle Kunene; Muller du Plessis; Caleb Dingaan; Con: Phepsi Buthelezi; Sanele Nohamba (9); Ralph Koster (2); Pen: Sanele Nohamba (2)	Referee: Mpho Matsaung

8 September 2018	Western Province U19	24–33	Free State U19	City Park Stadium, Athlone
13:30	Try: Ian Kitwanga; Waqar Solaan; Duren Hoffman; David Coetzer; Con: David Coetzer (2)	Scoreboard	Try: André Hanekom; Jacques van Biljon; Marc Morrison; James Mollentze; Charles Williams; Con: James Mollentze (4)	Referee: Divan Uys

Bye/s: Eastern Province U19

==== Round eleven ====
15 September 2018	Golden Lions U19	41–32	Western Province U19	Ellis Park Stadium, Johannesburg
10:30	Try: Tinus Combrinck; Janco van Heyningen (2); Yanga Hlalu (2); Edmund Ludick; Con: Christian Humphries (4); Pen: Christian Humphries	Scoreboard	Try: Quan Eymann (3); Christopher Schreuder; Con: David Coetzer; Christopher Schreuder (2); Pen: David Coetzer; Christopher Schreuder	Referee: Griffin Colby

15 September 2018	Eastern Province U19	19–38	Leopards U19	WJ de Wet Stadium, Despatch
11:30	Try: Johan Lombaard; Con: Dylan le Roux; Pen: Dylan le Roux (4)	Scoreboard	Try: Wihan Nel (2); Andries Fouche; Sylvester Hassien; AJ Meyer; Uys du Preez; Con: Tristan Oosthuizen (2); Hanru van Rooyen (2)	Referee: Bulelani Naka

15 September 2018	Sharks U19	34–24	Blue Bulls U19	Kings Park Stadium, Durban
13:00	Try: JJ van der Mescht; Vian Andre Fourie; Asanda Sihle Kunene; Muller du Plessis; Caleb Dingaan; Con: Sanele Nohamba (3); Pen: Sanele Nohamba	Scoreboard	Try: Phillip Potgieter; Luke Rossouw; Ruhan Viviers; Con: Vaughen Isaacs (2); Luke Rossouw; Pen: Vaughen Isaacs	Referee: Eduan Nel

Bye/s: Free State U19

==== Round twelve ====
19 September 2018	Blue Bulls U19	33–31	Eastern Province U19	Loftus Versfeld B, Pretoria
12:00	Try: Roanda Neluvhalani; Dylan Kruger; Orateng Koikanyang; Stephan van der Bank; Denzo Bruwer; Con: Stephan van der Bank (4)	Scoreboard	Try: Christian Frederic (2); Lacken Gray; Sachin Toring; Con: Sachin Toring (3); Dylan le Roux; Pen: Dylan le Roux	Referee: Archie Sehlako

21 September 2018	Free State U19	24–34	Golden Lions U19	Old Greys, Bloemfontein
13:00	Try: Elrigh Louw; André Hanekom (2); Jacques van Biljon; Con: Marc Morrison; Steffan Schoeman	Scoreboard	Try: Yanga Hlalu; Edmund Ludick (2); David Cary; Con: Christian Humphries (3); Keagan Lailvaux; Pen: Christian Humphries; Keagan Lailvaux	Referee: Mpho Matsaung

22 September 2018	Western Province U19	31–39	Sharks U19	Brookside, Cape Town
14:00	Try: Christiaan Rossouw; Ross Taylor; Tonderai Chiwambutsa; Vusile Dlepu; Angelo Davids; Con: Christopher Schreuder (2); David Coetzer	Scoreboard	Try: Fezokuhle Mbatha; JJ van der Mescht; Dylan Richardson; Asanda Sihle Kunene (2); Adriaan Staples; Con: Sanele Nohamba (3); Pen: Sanele Nohamba	Referee: Stephan Geldenhuys

Bye/s: Leopards U19

==== Round thirteen ====
28 September 2018	Eastern Province U19	18–47	Western Province U19	WJ de Wet Stadium, Despatch
12:00	Try: Lacken Gray; Luke Coetzee Smuts; Duane Hanekom; Pen: Dylan le Roux	Scoreboard	Try: Andile Nondwangu; Bevan Prinsloo; Francke Horn; Gerado Jaars; Angelo Davids; Duren Hoffman (2); Con: David Coetzer (6)	Referee: Sindile Ngcese

28 September 2018	Sharks U19	42–12	Free State U19	Kings Park Stadium, Durban
13:00	Try: JJ van der Mescht; Muller du Plessis; Caleb Dingaan (2); Thaakir Abrahams; Matthew Doyle; Con: Sanele Nohamba (2); Boeta Chamberlain; Pen: Sanele Nohamba; Boeta Chamberlain	Scoreboard	Try: André Hanekom; Franco van Eeden; Con: Marc Morrison	Referee: Divan Uys

29 September 2018	Leopards U19	36–41	Blue Bulls U19	Fanie du Toit Sport Ground, Potchefstroom
14:00	Try: Goose du Rand; George van der Westhuizen; Kagiso Woodbrigde; Andries Fouche (2); Craivian Smith; Con: Tristan Oosthuizen (2); Hanru van Rooyen	Scoreboard	Try: Dewald Donald; Llewellyn Classen; Janko Swanepoel; Ruben Beytell; Rune Lucas; Luke Rossouw; Marnus Potgieter; Con: Luke Rossouw; Andrew Kota; Vaughen Isaacs	Referee: Eduan Nel

Bye/s: Golden Lions U19

==== Round fourteen ====
5 October 2018	Golden Lions U19	19–57	Sharks U19	Ellis Park Stadium, Johannesburg
12:30	Try: Asenathi Ntlabakanye; Prince Nkabinde; Tinus Combrinck; Con: Christian Humphries (2)	Scoreboard	Try: James Scott; Dylan Richardson; Phepsi Buthelezi (2); Asanda Sihle Kunene; Caleb Dingaan (2); Adam Mountfort; Donald Falconer; Con: Sanele Nohamba (3); Boeta Chamberlain (2); Thaakir Abrahams	Referee: Christopher Allison

6 October 2018	Western Province U19	41–15	Leopards U19	City Park Stadium, Athlone
10:00	Try: Ruhann Greyling; Ross Taylor; Francke Horn; Duren Hoffman; Angelo Davids; David Coetzer; Con: Christopher Schreuder (4); Pen: Christopher Schreuder	Scoreboard	Try: Siyabonga Khoza; Heinrich Botha; Con: Tristan Oosthuizen; Pen: Tristan Oosthuizen	Referee: Vusi Msibi

6 October 2018	Free State U19	96–7	Eastern Province U19	CUT Stadium, Bloemfontein
12:00	Try: Janus Venter; Leon van Jaarsveld; Elrigh Louw (2); André Hanekom; Jacques van Biljon (2); Philppus Johannes Krugell; James Mollentze (2); Ayabonga Matroos; Cham Zondeki; Jason Raubenheimer; Juandre Sabbat; Message Nkosi penalty try Con: Marc Morrison (4); James Mollentze (3)	Scoreboard	Try: Sachin Toring; Con: Sachin Toring	Referee: Griffin Colby

Bye/s: Blue Bulls U19

== Title play-offs ==
=== Semifinals ===
19 October 2018	Blue Bulls U19	36–25	Golden Lions U19	Loftus Versfeld, Pretoria
13:00	Try: Jay Cee Nel; Marnus Potgieter; Sabastian Jobb; Carl Els; Ruhan Viviers; Con: Vaughen Isaacs (4); Pen: Vaughen Isaacs	Scoreboard	Try: Asenathi Ntlabakanye; Edmund Ludick; Gerrit Visser; Con: Keagan Lailvaux (2); Pen: Christian Humphries (2)	Referee: Vusi Msibi

20 October 2018	Sharks U19	45–23	Western Province U19	Kings Park Stadium, Durban
12:00	Try: Fezokuhle Mbatha; Dylan Richardson; Phepsi Buthelezi; Muller du Plessis; Le Roux Malan (2); Con: Sanele Nohamba (3); Pen: Sanele Nohamba (3)	Scoreboard	Try: Francke Horn; Christopher Schreuder; David Kriel; Con: Christopher Schreuder; Pen: Christopher Schreuder; Drop: Christopher Schreuder	Referee: Jaco Pretorius

=== Final ===
27 October 2018	Sharks U19	40–27	Blue Bulls U19	Newlands Stadium, Cape Town
11:00	Try: James Scott; Jeandre Labushagne; Vian Andre Fourie; Boeta Chamberlain; Con: Sanele Nohamba (4); Pen: Sanele Nohamba (3); Drop: Boeta Chamberlain	Scoreboard	Try: Jaco Labuschagne; Jay Cee Nel; Gerrit du Preez; Con: Vaughen Isaacs (3); Pen: Vaughen Isaacs (2)	Referee: Griffin Colby

== Honours ==
The honour roll for the 2018 Under-19 Provincial Championship was as follows:

2018 Under-19 Provincial Championship
Champions:	Sharks U19
Top points scorer:	Sanele Nohamba, Sharks U19 (152)
Top try scorers:	Caleb Dingaan, Sharks U19; Asanda Sihle Kunene, Sharks U19 (10)

== Players ==
The following squads were named for the 2018 Under-19 Provincial Championship:

Blue Bulls U19 squad
Ruben Beytell • Wiehan Bezuidenhout • Steven Billing • Wynand Breytenbach • Denzo Bruwer • Llewellyn Classen • Lorenzo Cloete • James Combrinck • Dewald Donald • Kudzwai Dube • Gerrit du Preez • Lian du Toit • Romeo Eksteen • Carl Els • Xavier Haupt • Alfred Holder • Vaughen Isaacs • Sabastian Jobb • Lukas Klopper • Carson Koekemoer • Orateng Koikanyang • Cornel Korff • Andrew Kota • Dylan Kruger • Jaco Labuschagne • Stephan Leonard • Rune Lucas • Domenique McArthur • Louis Meiring • Gerswin Mouton • Johan Mulder • Jay Cee Nel • Roanda Neluvhalani • Mangaliso Ntimba • Lehlohonolo Nyelele • Marnus Potgieter • Phillip Potgieter • Keanu Prinsloo • Luke Rossouw • Janko Swanepoel • Janco Uys • Stephan van der Bank • Marko van Niekerk • Joe van Zyl • Reinhardt Venter • Ruhan Viviers

Eastern Province U19 squad
Ryan Louis Adams • John Allison • Rodwill Baatjies • Shaun-Ray Beauzec • David Bosch • Pravin Ayron Bosch • Johan Botha • Shaun Botha • Graham de Vos • Duncan Diedericks • Jarred du Plessis • Likhona Dwili • Thabo Dyantyi • Dirkie Ferreira • Janu Fourie • Enrique Linley Franks • Christian Frederic • Nuwan Geduld • Cebo Gidane • Gregan Glover • Lacken Gray • Jean-Pierre Greyling • Warwick Griffin • Duane Hanekom • Raeez Harrison • Richard Horne • Ferlyn Jaftha • Kyle Jegels • Franco Jonker • Ruan Jonker • Dean Jordan • Vivian Kapp • Desmick Kleinbooi • Kholiwe Konza • Sibahle Kuhlane • Morne Labuschagne • Dylan le Roux • Marvin Loggenberg • Johan Lombaard • Lorenzo Magerman • Anele Makhongolo • Loqmaan Malick • Hugo Minnaar • Landile Mlonzi • Arno Nel • Dumisa Ngcivana • Miyelani Ngobeni • Edumisa Njumba • Ikhetheleng Nkhereanye • Mhlangabezi Ntwanambi • Alexander Palm • John Pauls • Anru Potgieter • Roysten Potgieter • Kevin Slow • Elandré Smit • Luke Coetzee Smuts • Willem de Witt Stadler • Tian Strydom • Johan Swart • Marcel Swartz • Uan Tait • Zach Toerien • Sachin Toring • Marthinus van der Linde • Deandré van der Merwe • Dewald van der Merwe • Wonga Wakashe • Micheal Whittock

Free State U19 squad
Zean Augustyn • Wilhelm Barnard • Marno Beyl • Stefanus Abraham Cloete • Cameron Douglas Dawson • Hendrik Divan de Clerk • Johannes Jurgens de Jager • John Fincham • Dwayne Fourie • Tiaan Fourie • André Hanekom • Luke Calvin Hertz • Jay-Jay Human • Philppus Johannes Krugell • Elrigh Louw • Noko Malatji • Shama Manzini • Willem Marais • Ayabonga Matroos • Gustav Meyer • Thabiso Mkhwebane • James Mollentze • Marc Morrison • Eric Myburgh • Willem Jacobus Naude Naudé • Mvuzo Nhlozi • Ryno Niemand • Message Nkosi • Nyiko Ntlemo • Isaac Pedro • George Putter • Jason Raubenheimer • Ruben Roodt • Juandre Sabbat • Steffan Schoeman • Le-Kleu Stokes • Kamo Tlale • Jacques van Biljon • Ruwald van der Merwe • Franco van Eeden • Leon van Jaarsveld • Deon van Niekerk • Janus Venter • Lötter Wessels • Thomas Jason Westermeyer • Johan Wilken • Charles Williams • Viaan Wolmarans • Cham Zondeki

Golden Lions U19 squad
Luke Bramhall • Eben Brand • Brendon Buitendag • Ebot Buma • David Cary • Tinus Combrinck • Gustav de Jager • Tiaan Drotskie • Keagan Glade • Michael Goodall • Yanga Hlalu • Christian Humphries • Eathan Jeffrey • Ruben Kotze • Keagan Lailvaux • Edmund Ludick • Nkosikhona Masuku • JW Meades • Njabulo Mjara • Kennedy Mpeku • Kevin Mpeku • Ziyanda Msipha • Mandisi Owethu Mthiyane • Hlumelo Ndudula • Prince Nkabinde • Asenathi Ntlabakanye • Jeremy Randall • Cal Smid • Smittie Smit • Giovanne Snyman • Mark Snyman • Wesley Thompson • Janco van Heyningen • Cristen van Niekerk • Dameon Venter • Jonathan Joshua Viljoen • Ewan Visser • Gerrit Visser

Leopards U19 squad
Mielies Beukes • Heinrich Botha • Truimp Boloyi • Joao Cristovam • Waldo Crous • Ruben du Plessis • Uys du Preez • Goose du Rand • James du Randt • Andries Fouche • Riaan Genis • Arno Gustafson • Sylvester Hassien • Handro Horn • Lohann Jahns • MC Janse van Rensburg • Bertru Jones • Reinard Jordaan • Wayne Joubert • John Keevy • Siyabonga Khoza • Lappie Labuschagne • Rory Leijdekkers • Sakkie Marais • Tokkie Marais • AJ Meyer • Gift Mosia • Ernest Nebe • Wihan Nel • Tristan Oosthuizen • Emilio Otto • Beast Sangweni • Craivian Smith • Pietie Snell • Mitchell van der Merwe • George van der Westhuizen • Corne van Romburgh • Hanru van Rooyen • Ruben Veldsman • Shellie Veldsman • Chris Vermaak • Corne Visagie • Devan Walters • Ajay Willemse • Kagiso Woodbrigde

Sharks U19 squad
Thaakir Abrahams • Sean Barnes • Phepsi Buthelezi • Boeta Chamberlain • Henk Cilliers • Armandt Conradie • Caleb Dingaan • Matthew Doyle • Muller du Plessis • Dre Engelbrecht • Donald Falconer • Vian Andre Fourie • Jesse Golding • Cole Haggard • Kieran Houlston • Jean Janse van Rensburg • Onke Jiba • Francois Klopper • Ralph Koster • Asanda Sihle Kunene • Jeandre Labushagne • Le Roux Malan • Siphamandla Matsinya • Fezokuhle Mbatha • Adam Mountfort • Sanele Nohamba • Ruhan Oosthuizen • Van Dyk Philip • Jordan Phipson • Dylan Richardson • Brendon Schwulst • James Scott • Adriaan Staples • Torin Tedder • JJ van der Mescht • ......... van Turha • Mark Venter • Ignacio Vidal • Thomas Jason Westermeyer

Western Province U19 squad
Christian Ambadiang Guetang • Dan Aspeling • Andries Blake • Dian Bleuler • Adriaan Burger • Tonderai Chiwambutsa • David Coetzer • Mitchell Connellan • Luke Dalbock • Angelo Davids • Jean-Louis de Lange • Vusile Dlepu • James du Preez • Divan Enslin • Quan Eymann • Nevaldo Fleurs • Ruhann Greyling • Duren Hoffman • Francke Horn • Thandile Hoyi • Gerado Jaars • Mogamat Karriem • Ian Kitwanga • Jean-Jacques Kotze • David Kriel • Tristan Leitch • Herman le Roux • Iwan Lombard • Sibusiso Madonsela • Henco Martins • Alexander Mbete • Henro Meyer • Cameron Moodie • Josh Muller • Durin Nasson • Andile Nondwangu • Mpho Ntsane • Hugo Pienaar • Rikus Pretorius • Bevan Prinsloo • Christiaan Rossouw • Christopher Schreuder • Waqar Solaan • Nathan Solomons • MJ Strauss • Rosco Syster • Ross Taylor • Marcel Theunissen • Aydon Topley • Marko van Niekerk • Aaron Zeederberg

== Referees ==
The following referees officiated matches in the 2018 Under-19 Provincial Championship:

2018 Under-19 Provincial Championship referees
Christopher Allison • Aimee Barrett-Theron • Stuart Berry • Rodney Boneparte • Griffin Colby • Stephan Geldenhuys • Jaco Kotze • Mpho Matsaung • Phumzile Mbewu • Ruhan Meiring • Vusi Msibi • Bulelani Naka • Eduan Nel • Jaco Pretorius • Archie Sehlako • Divan Uys • Ricus van der Hoven

== See also ==
- 2018 Currie Cup Premier Division
- 2018 Currie Cup First Division
