= 2019 Under-21 Provincial Championship =

- Countries: South Africa
- Date: 21 June – 7 September 2019
- Champions: Blue Bulls U21
- Runners-up: Western Province U21
- Matches played: 33
- Tries scored: 317 (average 9.6 per match)
- Top point scorer: Theo Boshoff (Blue Bulls U21, 153)
- Top try scorer: Cohen Jasper (Free State U21, 13)

The 2019 Under-21 Provincial Championship was the 2019 edition of the Under-21 Provincial Championship, an annual national Under-21 rugby union competition held in South Africa, and was contested from 21 June to 7 September 2019.

== Competition rules and information ==
There were six participating teams in the 2019 Under-21 Provincial Championship. Each team played the other five teams twice during the pool stage, once at home and once away. Teams received four points for a win and two points for a draw. Bonus points were awarded to teams that scored four or more tries in a game, as well as to teams that lost a match by seven points or less. Teams were ranked by log points, then points difference (points scored minus points conceded).

The top four teams in the pool stage qualified for the semi-finals, with the top-placed team hosting the fourth-placed team, and the second-placed team hosting the third-placed team. The two semi-final winners played in the final, played as a curtain-raiser for the 2019 Currie Cup Premier Division final.

== Teams ==
The teams that competed in the 2019 Under-21 Provincial Championship are:

Location of teams in the 2019 Under-21 Provincial Championship

2019 Under-21 Provincial Championship teams
Blue Bulls U21
Free State U21
Golden Lions U21
Leopards U21
Sharks U21
Western Province U21

== Regular season ==
=== Standings ===
The final standings in the 2019 Under-21 Provincial Championship were:

2019 Under-21 Provincial Championship standings
Pos	Team	P	W	D	L	PF	PA	PD	TF	TA	TB	LB	Pts
1	Blue Bulls U21	10	8	0	2	483	233	+250	66	31	8	2	42
2	Western Province U21	10	6	0	4	333	276	+57	45	37	7	2	33
3	Free State U21	10	6	0	4	420	442	−22	64	65	9	0	33
4	Sharks U21	10	4	0	6	338	317	+21	46	44	5	3	24
5	Golden Lions U21	10	4	0	6	260	333	−73	40	45	7	1	24
6	Leopards U21	10	2	0	8	228	461	−233	31	70	5	1	14

=== Round-by-round ===
The table below shows each team's progression throughout the season. For each round, each team's cumulative points total is shown with the overall log position in brackets.

Team Progression
Team	R1	R2	R3	R4	R5	R6	R7	R8	R9	R10	SF	F
Blue Bulls U21	5 (1st)	10 (1st)	15 (1st)	19 (1st)	24 (1st)	25 (1st)	27 (1st)	32 (1st)	37 (1st)	42 (1st)	Won	Won
Western Province U21	0 (6th)	5 (5th)	6 (4th)	8 (5th)	12 (4th)	16 (4th)	21 (3rd)	26 (3rd)	31 (3rd)	33 (2nd)	Won	Lost
Free State U21	1 (5th)	2 (6th)	7 (3rd)	12 (2nd)	17 (2nd)	22 (2nd)	27 (2nd)	32 (2nd)	32 (2nd)	33 (3rd)	Lost	—
Sharks U21	2 (4th)	6 (2nd)	10 (2nd)	11 (3rd)	13 (3rd)	18 (3rd)	18 (4th)	18 (4th)	19 (4th)	24 (4th)	Lost	—
Golden Lions U21	5 (2nd)	5 (4th)	5 (6th)	10 (4th)	10 (5th)	11 (5th)	16 (5th)	17 (5th)	19 (5th)	24 (5th)	—	—
Leopards U21	5 (3rd)	6 (3rd)	6 (5th)	7 (6th)	7 (6th)	8 (6th)	8 (6th)	9 (6th)	14 (6th)	14 (6th)	—	—
Key:	win	draw	loss	bye								

=== Matches ===
The following matches were played in the 2019 Under-21 Provincial Championship regular season:

==== Round one ====
21 June 2019	Blue Bulls U21	55–27	Western Province U21	Loftus Versfeld B, Pretoria
14:00	Try: Werner Fourie; Hanru Sirgel; Muller Uys (2); Damian Bonaparte; Andrew Kota (2); Con: Theo Boshoff (7); Pen: Theo Boshoff; Lionel April	Scoreboard	Try: Prince Orderson; Sihle Njezula; Lyle Hendricks; Con: Abner van Reenen (2); Christopher Schreuder; Pen: Abner van Reenen (2)	Referee: Griffin Colby

21 June 2019	Golden Lions U21	54–33	Free State U21	Wits Rugby Stadium, Johannesburg
14:00	Try: Nathan McBeth; Cohen Kiewit; Ruan Vermaak; Dian Schoonees; Kennedy Mpeku; Prince Nkabinde (2); Shaun Baxter; Con: Jack Hart; Ulrich Maritz (6)	Scoreboard	Try: Keanan Murray; Marthinus Boshoff; Carl Wijburg (2); Gustav Meyer; Con: Charles Williams; Aya Oliphant (3)	Referee: Stephan Geldenhuys

22 June 2019	Leopards U21	30–29	Sharks U21	Olën Park, Potchefstroom
12:00	Try: Reinard Jordaan; Lincoln Daniels; Bernu Engelbrecht (2); Con: André van der Berg (2); Pen: André van der Berg (2)	Scoreboard	Try: Le Roux Malan; Donald Falconer; Sicelo Tole penalty try Con: Boeta Chamberlain (2); Pen: Boeta Chamberlain	Referee: Vusi Msibi

==== Round two ====
29 June 2019	Free State U21	31–73	Blue Bulls U21	Shimla Park, Bloemfontein
13:00	Try: Marthinus Boshoff; Darren Adonis; RuHann Greyling; Conan le Fleur; Con: Charles Williams (4); Pen: Charles Williams	Scoreboard	Try: Werner Fourie; JC Pretorius (3); Muller Uys; Theo Boshoff; Cameron Hufke (2); Diego Appollis; Lionel April; Sango Xamlashe; Con: Theo Boshoff (9)	Referee: Ruhan Meiring

29 June 2019	Sharks U21	23–12	Golden Lions U21	KP2, Kings Park, Durban
13:00	Try: Thaakir Abrahams (2); Con: Boeta Chamberlain (2); Pen: Boeta Chamberlain (2); Drop: Boeta Chamberlain	Scoreboard	Try: Ruan Vermaak (2); Con: Keagan Lailvaux	Referee: Jaco Kotze

29 June 2019	Western Province U21	50–28	Leopards U21	Bellville RFC, Bellville
13:30	Try: Gift Dlamini; Abner van Reenen; Lyle Hendricks; Sihle Njezula; Sam Phiri (2); Josh Muller; Marcel Theunissen; Con: Abner van Reenen (5)	Scoreboard	Try: Sylvester Hassien; Reinard Jordaan; Chris Vermaak; Heinrich Botha; Con: André van der Berg (4)	Referee: Aimee Barrett-Theron

==== Round three ====
5 July 2019	Blue Bulls U21	59–5	Golden Lions U21	Loftus Versfeld, Pretoria
14:00	Try: Dewald Maritz; Werner Fourie; Mornay Smith; Theo Boshoff; Wian van Niekerk (2); Ewart Potgieter; Keagan Johannes; Cabous Eloff; Con: Theo Boshoff (6); Lionel April	Scoreboard	Try: Dameon Venter	Referee: Ben Crouse

6 July 2019	Leopards U21	18–45	Free State U21	Olën Park, Potchefstroom
13:00	Try: Heinrich Botha (2); Con: Janlu Steenkamp; Pen: André van der Berg (2)	Scoreboard	Try: Lubabalo Dobela; PJ Krugell; Cohen Jasper (4); RuHann Greyling; Con: Lubabalo Dobela (3); Gustav Meyer (2)	Referee: Jaco Pretorius

6 July 2019	Sharks U21	36–22	Western Province U21	KP2, Kings Park, Durban
15:00	Try: Adam Mountfort; Thaakir Abrahams; Jaden Hendrikse; Con: Adam Mountfort (2); Jaden Hendrikse; Pen: Adam Mountfort (3); Jaden Hendrikse; Drop: Adam Mountfort	Scoreboard	Try: Schalk Erasmus; Quan Eymann (2); Angelo Davids; Con: Abner van Reenen	Referee: Stephan Geldenhuys

==== Round four ====
12 July 2019	Blue Bulls U21	31–26	Sharks U21	Loftus Versfeld, Pretoria
14:00	Try: Sabastian Jobb; Gershwin Mouton; Etienne Janeke; Con: Theo Boshoff (2); Pen: Theo Boshoff (4)	Scoreboard	Try: JJ van der Mescht; Caleb Dingaan; Muller du Plessis; Con: Jaden Hendrikse; Pen: Jaden Hendrikse (3)	Referee: Griffin Colby

13 July 2019	Golden Lions U21	24–19	Leopards U21	Emirates Airline Park, Johannesburg
12:00	Try: Nathan McBeth; PJ Botha (2); Yanga Hlalu; Con: Keagan Lailvaux (2)	Scoreboard	Try: Sylvester Hassien; Lehlohonolo Nyelele; Chris Vermaak; Con: André van der Berg (2)	Referee: Phumzile Mbewu

13 July 2019	Free State U21	45–39	Western Province U21	Old Greys RC, Bloemfontein
13:00	Try: Ruben Cross; Elrigh Louw; Lubabalo Dobela; Marthinus Boshoff; James Mollentze; Conan le Fleur; Zinedine Booysen; Con: Lubabalo Dobela (5)	Scoreboard	Try: Schalk Erasmus; Gift Dlamini; Prince Orderson; Mike Mavovana; Gerado Jaars; Con: Abner van Reenen (3); David Coetzer; Pen: Abner van Reenen (2)	Referee: Christopher Allison

==== Round Five ====
19 July 2019	Golden Lions U21	10–20	Western Province U21	Wits Rugby Stadium, Johannesburg
13:00	Try: Dameon Venter; Con: Keagan Lailvaux; Pen: Keagan Lailvaux	Scoreboard	Try: Sihle Njezula (2); Con: David Coetzer; Abner van Reenen; Pen: David Coetzer (2)	Referee: Pablo DeLuca

20 July 2019	Sharks U21	40–44	Free State U21	Jonsson Kings Park, Durban
11:30	Try: Sean Barnes; Marcell Barnard; Evan Roos; Boeta Chamberlain; Caleb Dingaan; Le Roux Malan; Con: Boeta Chamberlain (5)	Scoreboard	Try: Ruben Cross (2); Ruan Smit; Elrigh Louw; PJ Krugell; Conan le Fleur (2); Con: James Mollentze (3); Pen: Lubabalo Dobela	Referee: Paul Mente

20 July 2019	Leopards U21	6–38	Blue Bulls U21	Olën Park, Potchefstroom
13:00	Pen: André van der Berg (2)	Scoreboard	Try: Cabous Eloff; Hanru Sirgel; Wian van Niekerk; Lian du Toit; Jay-Cee Nel penalty try Con: Vaughen Isaacs (3)	Referee: Archie Sehlako

==== Round Six ====
26 July 2019	Sharks U21	73–28	Leopards U21	KP2, Kings Park, Durban
14:00	Try: Cullen van der Merwe; Jaden Hendrikse (2); Boeta Chamberlain; Caleb Dingaan (4); Sicelo Tole (2); Muller du Plessis; Con: Boeta Chamberlain (9)	Scoreboard	Try: Ruben du Plessis; Andries Fouché; Sylvester Hassien (2); Con: André van der Berg (4)	Referee: Christopher Allison

27 July 2019	Free State U21	59–32	Golden Lions U21	Toyota Stadium, Bloemfontein
12:30	Try: Keanan Murray; Ruan Smit; Lubabalo Dobela; PJ Krugell; Conan le Fleur; Cohen Jasper (3); Carl Wijburg; Con: Lubabalo Dobela (7)	Scoreboard	Try: Adrian Alberts; MJ Pelser; Dian Schoonees (2); Tinus Combrinck; Ebot Buma; Con: Keagan Lailvaux	Referee: Stephan Geldenhuys

27 July 2019	Western Province U21	21–20	Blue Bulls U21	DHL Newlands, Cape Town
14:45	Try: Angelo Davids (2); Con: David Coetzer; Pen: David Coetzer (3)	Scoreboard	Try: JC Pretorius; Sabastian Jobb; Con: Theo Boshoff (2); Pen: Theo Boshoff (2)	Referee: Ben Crouse

==== Round Seven ====
2 August 2019	Golden Lions U21	29–14	Sharks U21	Emirates Airline Park, Johannesburg
13:00	Try: Tinus Combrinck; Shaun Williams; Luke Rossouw; Shaun Baxter; Con: Keagan Lailvaux (2); Ulrich Maritz; Pen: Luke Rossouw	Scoreboard	Try: Evan Roos; Sicelo Tole; Con: Boeta Chamberlain; Murray Koster	Referee: Aimee Barrett-Theron

3 August 2019	Leopards U21	19–47	Western Province U21	Olën Park, Potchefstroom
12:00	Try: Sylvester Hassien; André van der Berg; Lincoln Daniels; Con: André van der Berg (2)	Scoreboard	Try: Jessie Johnson; Prince Orderson; Angelo Davids (2); David Kriel; Schalk Erasmus; Gift Dlamini; Con: Abner van Reenen (6)	Referee: Phumzile Mbewu

3 August 2019	Blue Bulls U21	47–52	Free State U21	Loftus Versfeld, Pretoria
15:00	Try: Ewart Potgieter; Sabastian Jobb (2); Marnus Potgieter; Willem Steenkamp; Keagan Johannes; Con: Vaughen Isaacs (4); Pen: Vaughen Isaacs (3)	Scoreboard	Try: Luyolo Dapula; Elrigh Louw; PJ Krugell; Conan le Fleur; Cohen Jasper (4); Con: Lubabalo Dobela; James Mollentze (5)	Referee: Ruhan Meiring

==== Round Eight ====
9 August 2019	Western Province U21	35–13	Sharks U21	DHL Newlands, Cape Town
12:30	Try: Schalk Erasmus; Prince Orderson; Angelo Davids; David Kriel; Con: David Coetzer (2); Abner van Reenen; Pen: David Coetzer (3)	Scoreboard	Try: Dylan Richardson; Caleb Dingaan; Pen: Boeta Chamberlain	Referee: Paul Mente

9 August 2019	Free State U21	52–40	Leopards U21	Toyota Stadium, Bloemfontein
14:30	Try: Ruwald van der Merwe (2); Marthinus Boshoff (2); Conan le Fleur (2); Cohen Jasper (2); Con: James Mollentze (6)	Scoreboard	Try: Sampie Swiegers; Ruben Dreyer; André van der Berg; Siyabonga Khoza; Reinard Jordaan; Heinrich Botha; Con: André van der Berg (5)	Referee: Christopher Allison

10 August 2019	Golden Lions U21	33–41	Blue Bulls U21	Emirates Airline Park, Johannesburg
14:00	Try: Cohen Kiewit; MJ Pelser; Travis Gordon; Shaun Williams; Tatenda Mujawo; Con: Marc Morrison (4)	Scoreboard	Try: Keagan Johannes; Wian van Niekerk; Gershwin Mouton (2); Richard Kriel; Con: Vaughen Isaacs (3); Theo Boshoff (2); Pen: Vaughen Isaacs (2)	Referee: Jaco Kotze

==== Round Nine ====
16 August 2019	Sharks U21	25–44	Blue Bulls U21	Jonsson Kings Park, Durban
14:00	Try: Jeandré Labuschagne; Le Roux Malan; Donald Falconer; Rynhardt Jonker; Con: Jaden Hendrikse; Pen: Jaden Hendrikse	Scoreboard	Try: Mornay Smith; Keagan Johannes; Sabastian Jobb (2); Wian van Niekerk; Theo Boshoff; Con: Vaughen Isaacs; Theo Boshoff (3); Pen: Vaughen Isaacs (2)	Referee: Ben Crouse

17 August 2019	Leopards U21	33–28	Golden Lions U21	Olën Park, Potchefstroom
13:00	Try: Sylvester Hassien; Pienaar van Niekerk (2); Heinrich Botha; Con: Tristan Oosthuizen; Janlu Steenkamp; Pen: Tristan Oosthuizen; Janlu Steenkamp (2)	Scoreboard	Try: Mandisi Mthiyane; Shaun Williams; Tatenda Mujawo; Morné Brandon; Con: Marc Morrison (3); Luke Rossouw	Referee: Vusi Msibi

17 August 2019	Western Province U21	40–17	Free State U21	Phil Herbstein Field, Constantia
14:15	Try: Dan Jooste (3); Gift Dlamini (2); Sihle Njezula; Con: David Coetzer (4); Abner van Reenen	Scoreboard	Try: JW Meades; Conan le Fleur (2); Con: James Mollentze	Referee: Archie Sehlako

==== Round Ten ====
24 August 2019	Western Province U21	32–33	Golden Lions U21	Tygerberg RC, Cape Town
14:15	Try: Vusile Dlepu; Angelo Davids (2); David Kriel; Con: Abner van Reenen (3); Pen: Abner van Reenen (2)	Scoreboard	Try: Nathan McBeth; PJ Botha; Phillip Krause; Dian Schoonees; Tatenda Mujawo; Con: Marc Morrison (4)	Referee: Stephan Geldenhuys

24 August 2019	Free State U21	42–59	Sharks U21	Toyota Stadium, Bloemfontein
14:45	Try: JW Meades; Hannes Terblanche; Elrigh Louw (2); Conan le Fleur; Marthinus Boshoff; Con: James Mollentze (6)	Scoreboard	Try: Adam Mountfort; Evan Roos (3); Caleb Dingaan; Donald Falconer; Asanda Kunene; Thaakir Abrahams; Onke Jiba; Con: Jaden Hendrikse (7)	Referee: Ruhan Meiring

24 August 2019	Blue Bulls U21	75–7	Leopards U21	Loftus Versfeld, Pretoria
17:15	Try: Llewellyn Classen; Muller Uys (2); Keagan Johannes; Sabastian Jobb (2); Jay-Cee Nel (2); Gershwin Mouton; Richard Kriel; Phillip Potgieter; Con: Theo Boshoff (10)	Scoreboard	Try: Reinard Jordaan; Con: Janlu Steenkamp	Referee: Phumzile Mbewu

== Play-offs ==
=== Semi-finals ===
30 August 2019	Blue Bulls U21	42–41	Sharks U21	Loftus Versfeld, Pretoria
13:00	Try: Kudzwai Dube; Werner Fourie; Sabastian Jobb; Sango Xamlashe; Richard Kriel; Con: Theo Boshoff (4); Pen: Theo Boshoff (2); Drop: Theo Boshoff	Scoreboard	Try: Adam Mountfort; Evan Roos; Caleb Dingaan (3); Asanda Kunene; Con: Jaden Hendrikse (4); Pen: Jaden Hendrikse	Referee: Ruhan Meiring

31 August 2019	Western Province U21	52–10	Free State U21	Brookside, Cape Town
14:00	Try: Schalk Erasmus (2); Prince Orderson (2); David Coetzer; Dan Jooste; Jessie Johnson; Con: David Coetzer (5); Abner van Reenen (2); Drop: Abner van Reenen	Scoreboard	Try: Rewan Kruger; Con: James Mollentze; Pen: James Mollentze	Referee: Jaco Pretorius

=== Final ===
7 September 2019	Blue Bulls U21	33–27	Western Province U21	Toyota Stadium, Bloemfontein
13:45	Try: Stephan Smit 47'; Gershwin Mouton 62'; Carl Els 76'; Con: Theo Boshoff 48', 64', 77'; Pen: Theo Boshoff 3', 51', 69'; Drop: Theo Boshoff 79'	Scoreboard	Try: Prince Orderson 30'; Vusile Dlepu 34'; Gift Dlamini 80'; Con: David Coetzer 31', 35', 81'; Pen: David Coetzer 13', 25'	Referee: Paul Mente

== Honours ==
The honour roll for the 2019 Under-21 Provincial Championship was:

2019 Under-21 Provincial Championship
Champions:	Blue Bulls U21
Top points scorer:	Theo Boshoff, Blue Bulls U21 (153)
Top try scorer:	Cohen Jasper, Free State U21 (13)

== Players ==
The squads and player appearance and scoring statistics for the 2019 Under-21 Provincial Championship are as follows:

Blue Bulls U21
Name	WPR	FSC	LIO	SHA	LEO	WPR	FSC	LIO	SHA	LEO	SHA	WPR	App	Try	Con	Pen	DG	Pts
Dewald Maritz	1	1	1	1									4	1	0	0	0	5
Werner Fourie	2	2	2	2	2	2	2	2	2	16 (substituted in)	2	2	12	4	0	0	0	20
Mornay Smith	3	3	3	3	23 (substituted in)	3	23 (substituted in)	3	3	23 (substituted in)	3	3	12	2	0	0	0	10
Ryno Pieterse	4	4	4	4	18 (substituted in)	4		18 (substituted in)	4		4	4	10	0	0	0	0	0
Ruan Nortjé	5	5							5		5	5	5	0	0	0	0	0
Stephan Smit	6				19 (substituted in)	19 (substituted in)				6	6	6	6	1	0	0	0	5
Hanru Sirgel	7	7	7	8	8	8		7	7	7	7	7	11	2	0	0	0	10
Muller Uys	8	8	8					8	8	8	8	8	8	5	0	0	0	25
Lian du Toit	9	9	9	9	20 (substituted in)	9	9						7	1	0	0	0	5
Theo Boshoff	10	10	10	10	21 (substituted in)	10	21 (substituted in)	21 (substituted in)	21 (substituted in)	10	10	10	12	3	48	12	2	153
Damian Bonaparte	11									22 (substituted in)			2	1	0	0	0	5
Wian van Niekerk	12	12	12	12	12	12	12	12	12	21 (substituted in)	12	12	12	5	0	0	0	25
Diego Appollis	13	13											2	1	0	0	0	5
Jay-Cee Nel	14				22 (substituted in)	22 (substituted in)	22 (substituted in)	22 (substituted in)	22 (substituted in)	12			7	3	0	0	0	15
Andrew Kota	15	15	15	15	15	21 (substituted in)							6	2	0	0	0	10
Joe van Zyl	16 (substituted in)	17 (substituted in)	16 (substituted in)	16 (substituted in)									4	0	0	0	0	0
Cabous Eloff	17 (substituted in)	23 (substituted in)	23 (substituted in)	23 (substituted in)	3	23 (substituted in)	3	23 (substituted in)	23 (substituted in)	3	23 (substituted in)	23 (substituted in)	12	2	0	0	0	10
Carl Els	18 (substituted in)	18 (substituted in)	18 (substituted in)	18 (substituted in)	4	18 (substituted in)	4	4	18 (substituted in)	5	18 (substituted in)	18 (substituted in)	12	1	0	0	0	5
JC Pretorius	19 (substituted in)	6	6	6	6	6							6	4	0	0	0	20
Johan Mulder	20 (substituted in)	20 (substituted in)						20 (substituted in)	20 (substituted in)	20 (substituted in)	20 (substituted in)	20 (substituted in)	7	0	0	0	0	0
Lionel April	21 (substituted in)	21 (substituted in)	21 (substituted in)	21 (substituted in)							21 (substituted in)		5	1	1	1	0	10
Gershwin Mouton	22 (substituted in)	14	11	14	14	14	14	14	14	14	14	14	12	5	0	0	0	25
Etienne Janeke	23 (substituted in)			17 (substituted in)	1	1	17 (substituted in)	17 (substituted in)	17 (substituted in)	17 (substituted in)	17 (substituted in)	17	9	1	0	0	0	5
Cameron Hufke		11											1	2	0	0	0	10
Wiehan Bezuidenhout		16 (substituted in)	17 (substituted in)										2	0	0	0	0	0
Ewart Potgieter		19 (substituted in)	19 (substituted in)	7			8	19 (substituted in)	19 (substituted in)	4	19 (substituted in)	19	8	2	0	0	0	10
Sango Xamlashe		22 (substituted in)	22 (substituted in)	22 (substituted in)	13						13	22	5	2	0	0	0	10
Janko Swanepoel			5	5	5	5							4	0	0	0	0	0
Marnus Potgieter			13	13		13	13	13	13	13		13	8	1	0	0	0	5
Sabastian Jobb			14	11	11	11	11	11	11	11	11	11	10	9	0	0	0	45
Keagan Johannes			20 (substituted in)	20 (substituted in)	9	20 (substituted in)	20 (substituted in)	9	9	9	9	9	10	5	0	0	0	25
Jaco Labuschagné				19 (substituted in)	7	7	6	6	6				6	0	0	0	0	0
Vaughen Isaacs					10	15	10	10	10			21	5	0	11	7	0	43
Llewellyn Classen					16 (substituted in)	16 (substituted in)	16 (substituted in)	16	16 (substituted in)	2	16 (substituted in)	16	6	1	0	0	0	5
Kudzwai Dube					17 (substituted in)	17 (substituted in)	1	1	1	1	1	1	8	1	0	0	0	5
Raymond Nel							5	5					2	0	0	0	0	0
Orateng Koikanyang							7						1	0	0	0	0	0
Richard Kriel							15	15	15	15	15	15	6	3	0	0	0	15
Reinhardt Venter							18 (substituted in)						1	0	0	0	0	0
Willem Steenkamp							19 (substituted in)						1	1	0	0	0	5
Micheal Amiras										18 (substituted in)			1	0	0	0	0	0
Phillip Potgieter										19 (substituted in)			1	1	0	0	0	5
Dawid Kellerman											22		0	0	0	0	0	0
penalty try													–	1	–	–	–	7
Total													12	74	60	20	2	558

Free State U21
Name	LIO	BUL	LEO	WPR	SHA	LIO	BUL	LEO	WPR	SHA	WPR	F	App	Try	Con	Pen	DG	Pts
Eddie Davids	1	1	1	1	1	1	1	1	1	1	1	—	11	0	0	0	0	0
Janus Venter	2						17 (substituted in)	17 (substituted in)	16 (substituted in)		16 (substituted in)	—	5	0	0	0	0	0
Thembinkosi Mangwana	3	3	3	3			18 (substituted in)		17 (substituted in)	17 (substituted in)	17 (substituted in)	—	8	0	0	0	0	0
Deon van Niekerk	4	19 (substituted in)										—	2	0	0	0	0	0
Keanan Murray	5	5	5	5	5	5				5	5	—	8	2	0	0	0	10
Ruan Smit	6		6	6	6	6	19 (substituted in)	6	7		19 (substituted in)	—	9	2	0	0	0	10
Stefan Engelbrecht	7	20 (substituted in)	19	19 (substituted in)	19	7		19 (substituted in)	20 (substituted in)	19 (substituted in)	20 (substituted in)	—	8	0	0	0	0	0
Olie Losaba	8											—	1	0	0	0	0	0
Rewan Kruger	9	9	9	9	9	9	9	21 (substituted in)	9	9	9	—	11	1	0	0	0	5
Charles Williams	10	10										—	2	0	5	1	0	13
Marthinus Boshoff	11	11	14	11	14	14	14	11	14	14	11	—	11	6	0	0	0	30
Aya Oliphant	12	13	13	23	22 (substituted in)	23 (substituted in)	23 (substituted in)	23 (substituted in)		22 (substituted in)	13	—	9	0	3	0	0	6
Rassie Breedt	13								23 (substituted in)			—	2	0	0	0	0	0
Janco van Heyningen	14	14						22 (substituted in)		23 (substituted in)		—	4	0	0	0	0	0
Cohen Jasper	15		15	15	15	15	15	15	15	15	14	—	10	13	0	0	0	65
Carl Wijburg	16 (substituted in)				16	16 (substituted in)	16 (substituted in)					—	3	3	0	0	0	15
Gerrit Visser	17 (substituted in)	18 (substituted in)			3	3		3	18 (substituted in)	18 (substituted in)	3	—	8	0	0	0	0	0
Willem Marais	18		18 (substituted in)	17 (substituted in)	17	17 (substituted in)						—	3	0	0	0	0	0
Nathan Jordan	19 (substituted in)	4	4	4	4	4	5		4	4	4	—	10	0	0	0	0	0
Gustav Meyer	20 (substituted in)		20 (substituted in)	21 (substituted in)			6	20 (substituted in)	6			—	6	1	2	0	0	9
Darren Adonis	21 (substituted in)	15	23 (substituted in)	14								—	4	1	0	0	0	5
Keegan Haman	22 (substituted in)	12			23 (substituted in)	21 (substituted in)						—	4	0	0	0	0	0
Conan le Fleur	23	23 (substituted in)	22	13	13	13	13	13	13	13	23 (substituted in)	—	9	11	0	0	0	55
Ruben Cross		2	2	2	2	2	2	2	2	2	2	—	10	3	0	0	0	15
Hannes Terblanche		6		20 (substituted in)	20 (substituted in)	20 (substituted in)	21 (substituted in)		22 (substituted in)	6		—	7	1	0	0	0	5
Luyolo Dapula		7				19	4	4	19 (substituted in)	20 (substituted in)	22 (substituted in)	—	6	1	0	0	0	5
Ruwald van der Merwe		8	8	8	8	8	8	8	8	8	8	—	10	2	0	0	0	10
RuHann Greyling		16 (substituted in)	16 (substituted in)	16 (substituted in)			20 (substituted in)	16 (substituted in)		16 (substituted in)		—	6	2	0	0	0	10
JW Meades		17 (substituted in)	17 (substituted in)	18 (substituted in)	18	18 (substituted in)	3	18 (substituted in)	3	3	18 (substituted in)	—	9	2	0	0	0	10
Jacques van Biljon		21 (substituted in)					22 (substituted in)					—	2	0	0	0	0	0
Lubabalo Dobela		22 (substituted in)	10	10	10	10	10	10	10	10	10	—	10	3	16	1	0	50
Elrigh Louw			7	7	7		7	7	5	7	7	—	8	5	0	0	0	25
PJ Krugell			11		11	11	11	14	11	11		—	7	4	0	0	0	20
James Mollentze			12	12	12	12	12	12	12	12	12	—	9	1	22	1	0	52
Divan de Clerk			21 (substituted in)									—	1	0	0	0	0	0
Zinedine Booysen				22 (substituted in)	21 (substituted in)	22 (substituted in)		9	21 (substituted in)	21 (substituted in)	21 (substituted in)	—	7	1	0	0	0	5
Mervyn Roos								5				—	1	0	0	0	0	0
Lourens Oosthuizen											6	—	1	0	0	0	0	0
Emilio Adonis											15	—	1	0	0	0	0	0
Total													11	65	48	3	0	430

Golden Lions U21
Name	FSC	SHA	BUL	LEO	WPR	FSC	SHA	BUL	LEO	WPR	SF	F	App	Try	Con	Pen	DG	Pts
Nathan McBeth	1	1	1	1	1	1	1	1		1	—	—	9	3	0	0	0	15
PJ Botha	2	2	2	2	2		2	2	2	2	—	—	9	3	0	0	0	15
Cohen Kiewit	3	3					18 (substituted in)	3	3	3	—	—	6	2	0	0	0	10
Mandisi Mthiyane	4	4						19 (substituted in)	7	4	—	—	5	1	0	0	0	5
Ruan Vermaak	5	5	5								—	—	3	3	0	0	0	15
MJ Pelser	6	6	12	6	6	6	6	6	6	12	—	—	10	2	0	0	0	10
Dian Schoonees	7	7	7		8	8				8	—	—	6	4	0	0	0	20
Travis Gordon	8	8	6					8	8	20 (substituted in)	—	—	6	1	0	0	0	5
Jack Hart	9	9	9	9	9	21 (substituted in)	21 (substituted in)	21 (substituted in)		21 (substituted in)	—	—	9	0	1	0	0	2
Ulrich Maritz	10	10					22 (substituted in)	22	22 (substituted in)		—	—	4	0	7	0	0	14
Kennedy Mpeku	11	15		11	15	15	23 (substituted in)				—	—	6	1	0	0	0	5
Yanga Hlalu	12	12		13	13	13	13	13	13		—	—	8	1	0	0	0	5
Muzi Manyike	13	23	23 (substituted in)	23 (substituted in)					23 (substituted in)	23 (substituted in)	—	—	5	0	0	0	0	0
Prince Nkabinde	14	14	11							11	—	—	4	2	0	0	0	10
Shaun Baxter	15		15	15			15	15	15		—	—	6	2	0	0	0	10
Tiaan van der Merwe	16 (substituted in)	16 (substituted in)		17 (substituted in)	17 (substituted in)	2	16 (substituted in)		1		—	—	7	0	0	0	0	0
Nkosikhona Masuku	17 (substituted in)	17 (substituted in)	17 (substituted in)								—	—	3	0	0	0	0	0
Herman Agenbag	18 (substituted in)	18 (substituted in)									—	—	2	0	0	0	0	0
Adrian Alberts	19 (substituted in)	19 (substituted in)				4					—	—	3	1	0	0	0	5
Cal Smid	20 (substituted in)	20 (substituted in)	8	8	4						—	—	5	0	0	0	0	0
Shaun Williams	21 (substituted in)		21 (substituted in)	21 (substituted in)	23 (substituted in)	11	11	11	11	15	—	—	9	3	0	0	0	15
Wyclef Vlitoor	22 (substituted in)		22 (substituted in)	22 (substituted in)	22 (substituted in)						—	—	4	0	0	0	0	0
Mauritz Pretorius	23 (substituted in)			14	14						—	—	3	0	0	0	0	0
Tatenda Mujawo		11	14		11		14	14	14	14	—	—	7	3	0	0	0	15
Manuel Rass		13	13								—	—	2	0	0	0	0	0
Tinus Combrinck		21 (substituted in)			21 (substituted in)	9	9	9	9	9	—	—	7	2	0	0	0	10
Keagan Lailvaux		22 (substituted in)		10	10	10	10				—	—	5	0	7	1	0	17
Keagan Glade			3			18 (substituted in)			18 (substituted in)		—	—	3	0	0	0	0	0
Cristen van Niekerk			4	5	5	5	4	4	4		—	—	7	0	0	0	0	0
Austin Davids			10			22 (substituted in)				22 (substituted in)	—	—	3	0	0	0	0	0
Dameon Venter			16 (substituted in)	16 (substituted in)	16 (substituted in)						—	—	3	2	0	0	0	10
Asenathi Ntlabakanye			18 (substituted in)	18 (substituted in)	3	3	3	18 (substituted in)		18 (substituted in)	—	—	7	0	0	0	0	0
Edward White			19 (substituted in)	4					19 (substituted in)		—	—	3	0	0	0	0	0
Morné Brandon			20 (substituted in)			16 (substituted in)		16 (substituted in)	16 (substituted in)	16 (substituted in)	—	—	5	1	0	0	0	5
Ebot Buma				3	18 (substituted in)	17 (substituted in)	17 (substituted in)	17 (substituted in)	17 (substituted in)	17 (substituted in)	—	—	7	1	0	0	0	5
Emmanuel Tshituka				7			7	20 (substituted in)			—	—	3	0	0	0	0	0
Seun Maduna				12		23 (substituted in)		23 (substituted in)			—	—	3	0	0	0	0	0
Frans Gerber				19 (substituted in)	19 (substituted in)	19 (substituted in)					—	—	3	0	0	0	0	0
Phillip Krause				20 (substituted in)	7					6	—	—	3	1	0	0	0	5
Luke Rossouw					12	12	12	12	12	13	—	—	6	1	1	1	0	10
Tristan Dullisear					20 (substituted in)		20 (substituted in)		20 (substituted in)		—	—	3	0	0	0	0	0
Sibusiso Sangweni						7	8	7		19 (substituted in)	—	—	4	0	0	0	0	0
Njabulo Mjara						14					—	—	1	0	0	0	0	0
Franco Schutte						20 (substituted in)					—	—	1	0	0	0	0	0
Darrien Landsberg							5	5	5	5	—	—	4	0	0	0	0	0
Philip Apea-Adu							19 (substituted in)				—	—	1	0	0	0	0	0
Marc Morrison								10	10	10	—	—	3	0	11	0	0	22
Hlumelo Ndudula									21 (substituted in)		—	—	1	0	0	0	0	0
Vincent Tshituka										7	—	—	1	0	0	0	0	0
Total													10	40	27	2	0	260

Leopards U21
Name	SHA	WPR	FSC	LIO	BUL	SHA	WPR	FSC	LIO	BUL	SF	F	App	Try	Con	Pen	DG	Pts
Rehann Baumann	1	1	1	1	17 (substituted in)	17	17 (substituted in)	17 (substituted in)	17	17 (substituted in)	—	—	8	0	0	0	0	0
Stefanus Maré	2	16 (substituted in)	16 (substituted in)	16 (substituted in)	2	2	2	2	2	2	—	—	10	0	0	0	0	0
Ruben du Plessis	3	3	3	23 (substituted in)	1	1	1	1	1	1	—	—	10	1	0	0	0	5
Wihan Nel	4	4	4	4	4	4			19	19	—	—	6	0	0	0	0	0
Ruben Dreyer	5	8	7	8	7		20	7	7	5	—	—	8	1	0	0	0	5
Kagiso Woodbridge	6	18 (substituted in)	18 (substituted in)								—	—	3	0	0	0	0	0
Olivier de Beer	7	7	19 (substituted in)	7							—	—	4	0	0	0	0	0
Andries Fouché	8	6	8	6	8	8	6	8	8	8	—	—	10	1	0	0	0	5
Sylvester Hassien	9	9	9	9	9	9	9	9	9	9	—	—	10	6	0	0	0	30
André van der Berg	10	10	10	10	10	10	10	10			—	—	8	2	19	6	0	66
Lehlohonolo Nyelele	11	22 (substituted in)	14	14	23 (substituted in)	11		23 (substituted in)			—	—	7	1	0	0	0	5
Reinard Jordaan	12	12	12				22 (substituted in)	13	13	13	—	—	7	4	0	0	0	20
Lincoln Daniels	13	13	13	13	13	13	11		11	11	—	—	9	2	0	0	0	10
Pienaar van Niekerk	14	14			14	14	14	14	14	14	—	—	8	2	0	0	0	10
Keagan Tait	15	15									—	—	2	0	0	0	0	0
Gustav du Rand	16 (substituted in)	2	2	2	16	16 (substituted in)					—	—	5	0	0	0	0	0
Ebi Davids	17 (substituted in)	17 (substituted in)	17 (substituted in)	17 (substituted in)							—	—	4	0	0	0	0	0
Ruan Spies	18 (substituted in)	5	5	5							—	—	4	0	0	0	0	0
Chris Vermaak	19 (substituted in)	19 (substituted in)	6	19 (substituted in)	6	6		6	6	6	—	—	9	2	0	0	0	10
Bernu Engelbrecht	20 (substituted in)	21 (substituted in)	20 (substituted in)	20 (substituted in)						21 (substituted in)	—	—	5	2	0	0	0	10
Heinrich Botha	21 (substituted in)	20 (substituted in)	15	15	15	15	15	15	15	15	—	—	10	5	0	0	0	25
Siyabonga Khoza	22 (substituted in)	11	11	11		23 (substituted in)	23 (substituted in)	11		22 (substituted in)	—	—	8	1	0	0	0	5
Lukas Klopper	23	23 (substituted in)	23 (substituted in)		18 (substituted in)		16 (substituted in)	16 (substituted in)	16	16	—	—	5	0	0	0	0	0
Janlu Steenkamp			21 (substituted in)	12	12	12	13		12	10	—	—	7	0	3	2	0	12
Ishaad Snyman			22 (substituted in)	22	11				23	23 (substituted in)	—	—	3	0	0	0	0	0
Sampie Swiegers				3	3	3	3	3	3	3	—	—	7	1	0	0	0	5
Ernest Nebe				18 (substituted in)	5	5	5	5	5	20 (substituted in)	—	—	7	0	0	0	0	0
Lohann Jahns				21	22 (substituted in)	22 (substituted in)	12	12	22	12	—	—	5	0	0	0	0	0
Awethu Lushozi					19 (substituted in)	19 (substituted in)	4	4	4	4	—	—	6	0	0	0	0	0
Sheldon Veldsman					20 (substituted in)	7	8		20	7	—	—	4	0	0	0	0	0
Cameron Dorfling					21 (substituted in)	21 (substituted in)	21 (substituted in)	21 (substituted in)	21		—	—	4	0	0	0	0	0
Eben Brand						18 (substituted in)	18 (substituted in)	18 (substituted in)	18	18 (substituted in)	—	—	4	0	0	0	0	0
Mark Etzebeth						20 (substituted in)	7				—	—	2	0	0	0	0	0
Justin Sadie							19	19 (substituted in)			—	—	1	0	0	0	0	0
Dihan Odendaal								20 (substituted in)			—	—	1	0	0	0	0	0
Tristan Oosthuizen								22 (substituted in)	10		—	—	2	0	1	1	0	5
Total													10	31	23	9	0	228

Sharks U21
Name	LEO	LIO	WPR	BUL	FSC	LEO	LIO	WPR	BUL	FSC	BUL	F	App	Try	Con	Pen	DG	Pts
James Scott	1	1		1			17 (substituted in)	17 (substituted in)	1	1	1	—	8	0	0	0	0	0
Cullen van der Merwe	2	16 (substituted in)	16	16 (substituted in)		2	2			2	2	—	7	1	0	0	0	5
Francois Klopper	3	3	3	18 (substituted in)	17 (substituted in)	3	3	3				—	8	0	0	0	0	0
Marcell Barnard	4	19 (substituted in)	19 (substituted in)	19 (substituted in)	4							—	5	1	0	0	0	5
Jeandré Labuschagne	5	5	5	5	5	7	7	7	7	7	7	—	11	1	0	0	0	5
Adam Mountfort	6	6	10	8	8	6	6	8		6	6	—	10	3	2	3	1	31
Evan Roos	7	7	7	7	7	8	8			8	8	—	9	6	0	0	0	30
Jacques Ackerman	8								8	20 (substituted in)	20 (substituted in)	—	4	0	0	0	0	0
Xavier Swartbooi	9	21		21 (substituted in)	21	21 (substituted in)	21 (substituted in)	21 (substituted in)	22	21 (substituted in)	21	—	6	0	0	0	0	0
Murray Koster	10	12	12	10	12	12	12	12	10	12	10	—	11	0	1	0	0	2
Henk Cilliers	11	11	11	14	14	13	13	14	14			—	9	0	0	0	0	0
Le Roux Malan	12	22 (substituted in)	22 (substituted in)	12	22 (substituted in)	22 (substituted in)	22 (substituted in)		12	22 (substituted in)	12	—	10	3	0	0	0	15
Donald Falconer	13							22 (substituted in)	13	13	13	—	5	3	0	0	0	15
Sicelo Tole	14	14	14	23	23	14	14					—	5	4	0	0	0	20
Boeta Chamberlain	15	10	20 (substituted in)		10	10	10	10				—	7	2	19	4	1	63
Donovan Grant	16 (substituted in)					16 (substituted in)	16 (substituted in)	16 (substituted in)	2			—	5	0	0	0	0	0
Sean Barnes	17 (substituted in)	17 (substituted in)	1	17 (substituted in)	1	1	1	1	17 (substituted in)	17 (substituted in)	17 (substituted in)	—	11	1	0	0	0	5
Cleopas Kundiona	18 (substituted in)	18 (substituted in)	18	3	3				3	18 (substituted in)	18 (substituted in)	—	7	0	0	0	0	0
Lunga Ncube	19 (substituted in)			20 (substituted in)	19	19 (substituted in)		20 (substituted in)	20 (substituted in)			—	5	0	0	0	0	0
Vian Fourie	20 (substituted in)			6	20 (substituted in)			6	6			—	5	0	0	0	0	0
James Bruce	21 (substituted in)											—	1	0	0	0	0	0
Muller du Plessis	22 (substituted in)	13	13	13	13	15	15	13				—	8	2	0	0	0	10
Onke Jiba	23 (substituted in)									23 (substituted in)	23 (substituted in)	—	3	1	0	0	0	5
Fez Mbatha		2	2		2							—	3	0	0	0	0	0
JJ van der Mescht		4	4	4			19 (substituted in)	19 (substituted in)	4	4	4	—	8	1	0	0	0	5
Phepsi Buthelezi		8										—	1	0	0	0	0	0
Sanele Nohamba		9	9									—	2	0	0	0	0	0
Thaakir Abrahams		15	15	15	15			15	15	15	15	—	8	4	0	0	0	20
Celimpilo Gumede		20 (substituted in)	8									—	2	0	0	0	0	0
Caleb Dingaan		23 (substituted in)	23 (substituted in)	11	11	11	11	11		11	11	—	9	11	0	0	0	55
Dylan Richardson			6	2	6			2				—	4	1	0	0	0	5
Gugu Nelani			17 (substituted in)									—	1	0	0	0	0	0
Jaden Hendrikse			21 (substituted in)	9	9	9	9	9	9	9	9	—	9	3	14	6	0	61
Rynhardt Jonker				22					23 (substituted in)	10	22 (substituted in)	—	3	1	0	0	0	5
Cole Haggard					16 (substituted in)	17 (substituted in)						—	2	0	0	0	0	0
Emile van Heerden					18 (substituted in)	5	5	5	5	5	5	—	7	0	0	0	0	0
Dylan Weideman						4	4	4	19 (substituted in)	19 (substituted in)	19 (substituted in)	—	6	0	0	0	0	0
Tiaan de Jager						18 (substituted in)	18 (substituted in)	18 (substituted in)	18 (substituted in)			—	4	0	0	0	0	0
Ntsika Fisanti						20 (substituted in)	20 (substituted in)		21 (substituted in)			—	3	0	0	0	0	0
Asanda Kunene						23 (substituted in)	23 (substituted in)	23 (substituted in)	11	14	14	—	6	2	0	0	0	10
Mark Venter									16 (substituted in)	16 (substituted in)	16	—	2	0	0	0	0	0
Hanru Jacobs										3	3	—	2	0	0	0	0	0
penalty try													–	1	–	–	–	7
Total													11	46	32	12	2	338

Western Province U21
Name	BUL	LEO	SHA	FSC	LIO	BUL	LEO	SHA	FSC	LIO	FSC	BUL	App	Try	Con	Pen	DG	Pts
Leon Lyons	1	1	1	1	1	1	17 (substituted in)	1	1	1	1		11	0	0	0	0	0
Schalk Erasmus	2		2	2	2	2	16 (substituted in)	2		2	2	2	10	6	0	0	0	30
Sazi Sandi	3	3	3	3	3	3	18 (substituted in)	3	3		3	3	11	0	0	0	0	0
Ian Kitwanga	4	4	4	4	19 (substituted in)	19 (substituted in)	4	19 (substituted in)			19 (substituted in)	19	9	0	0	0	0	0
Ben-Jason Dixon	5	5	7	5	5	5	19 (substituted in)	5	5	5	5	5	12	0	0	0	0	0
Gift Dlamini	6	6		6	6	6	20 (substituted in)	6	6	6	6	6	11	6	0	0	0	30
Prince Orderson	7	7	20 (substituted in)	7	7	7	7	7	7		7	7	11	7	0	0	0	35
Adrian Paarwater	8	8	6	20 (substituted in)	8	8	8	8	8	8	8	8	12	0	0	0	0	0
Deon Carstens	9	9	9				21 (substituted in)				21 (substituted in)		5	0	0	0	0	0
Abner van Reenen	10	10	10	10	22 (substituted in)	22 (substituted in)	10	22 (substituted in)	22 (substituted in)	10	22 (substituted in)	22	11	1	25	6	1	76
Sihle Njezula	11	13	11	11	14	14		14	14	14	14	14	11	5	0	0	0	25
Lyle Hendricks	12	12	12	12	23 (substituted in)	13	22 (substituted in)	13	13	12	13	13	12	2	0	0	0	10
Matt More	13	23 (substituted in)		13			13	23 (substituted in)	23 (substituted in)	13			7	0	0	0	0	0
Sam Phiri	14	14	14										3	2	0	0	0	10
Quan Eymann	15	15	15		15					23 (substituted in)			5	2	0	0	0	10
Christiaan Rossouw	16 (substituted in)	2	16 (substituted in)										3	0	0	0	0	0
MJ Strauss	17 (substituted in)	17 (substituted in)			18 (substituted in)								3	0	0	0	0	0
Jean-Louis de Lange	18 (substituted in)								19 (substituted in)	19			2	0	0	0	0	0
Marcel Theunissen	19 (substituted in)	19 (substituted in)	8	8	4	4	5	4	4	4	4	4	12	1	0	0	0	5
Vusile Dlepu	20 (substituted in)	21 (substituted in)	21 (substituted in)	9	9	9		9	9	9	9	9	11	2	0	0	0	10
Christopher Schreuder	21 (substituted in)												1	0	1	0	0	2
Duren Hoffman	22	11		23 (substituted in)	11	23	14						4	0	0	0	0	0
Dandré Degenaar	23 (substituted in)	18	18 (substituted in)	18		18 (substituted in)	3	18 (substituted in)	18 (substituted in)	3	18 (substituted in)	18 (substituted in)	9	0	0	0	0	0
Josh Muller		16 (substituted in)		16	16 (substituted in)				16 (substituted in)				3	1	0	0	0	5
Henco Martins		20 (substituted in)											1	0	0	0	0	0
Waqar Solaan		22 (substituted in)											1	0	0	0	0	0
Salmaan Moerat			5										1	0	0	0	0	0
Rikus Pretorius			13		12	12	12	12	12		12	12	8	0	0	0	0	0
Dian Bleuler			17	17 (substituted in)	17 (substituted in)	17 (substituted in)	1	17 (substituted in)	17 (substituted in)	17 (substituted in)	17 (substituted in)	1	9	0	0	0	0	0
Jessie Johnson			19 (substituted in)	19 (substituted in)	20 (substituted in)	20 (substituted in)	6	20 (substituted in)	20 (substituted in)	7	20 (substituted in)	20	9	2	0	0	0	10
David Coetzer			22 (substituted in)	22 (substituted in)	10	10		10	10		10	10	8	1	17	10	0	69
Angelo Davids			23 (substituted in)			11	11	11	11	11	11	11	8	8	0	0	0	40
Mike Mavovana				14									1	1	0	0	0	5
David Kriel				15	13	15	15	15	15	15	15	15	9	3	0	0	0	15
Gerado Jaars				21 (substituted in)	21 (substituted in)	21 (substituted in)	9	21 (substituted in)	21 (substituted in)	21 (substituted in)		21 (substituted in)	8	1	0	0	0	5
Dan Jooste						16 (substituted in)	2	16 (substituted in)	2	16 (substituted in)	16 (substituted in)	16	6	4	0	0	0	20
Sako Makata							23 (substituted in)				23 (substituted in)	23	2	0	0	0	0	0
Hugo Pienaar										18 (substituted in)		17	1	0	0	0	0	0
De Wet Marais										20 (substituted in)			1	0	0	0	0	0
Juan Mostert										22 (substituted in)			1	0	0	0	0	0
Total													12	55	43	16	1	412

(c) denotes the team captain. For each match, the player's squad number is shown. Starting players are numbered 1 to 15, while the replacements are numbered 16 to 23. If a replacement made an appearance in the match, it is indicated by (substituted in) . "App" refers to the number of appearances made by the player, "Try" to the number of tries scored by the player, "Con" to the number of conversions kicked, "Pen" to the number of penalties kicked, "DG" to the number of drop goals kicked and "Pts" refer to the total number of points scored by the player.

== Referees ==
The following referees officiated matches in the 2019 Under-21 Provincial Championship:

2019 Under-21 Provincial Championship referees
Christopher Allison • Aimee Barrett-Theron • Griffin Colby • Ben Crouse • Pablo DeLuca • Stephan Geldenhuys • Jaco Kotze • Phumzile Mbewu • Ruhan Meiring • Paul Mente • Vusi Msibi • Jaco Pretorius • Archie Sehlako

== See also ==
- 2019 Currie Cup Premier Division
- 2019 Currie Cup First Division
- 2019 Rugby Challenge
