= Sione Tui =

Australian rugby union player

- Born: 8 July 1999 (age 27) Australia
- Height: 1.80 m (5 ft 11 in)
- Weight: 94 kg (14 st 11 lb)
- School: St Kevin's College
- University: Victoria University

Rugby union career
- Position: Wing
- Current team: Stade Français
Senior career
Years	Team	Apps	(Points)
2018–2019	Melbourne Rising	4	(0)
2019–	Stade Français		
2021	→ US Carcassonne (loan)		
Super Rugby
Years	Team	Apps	(Points)
2019	Rebels	0	(0)
International career
Years	Team	Apps	(Points)
2019	Australia U20		
Medal record
Men's rugby union
Representing Australia
Oceania U20 Championship
Winner	2019 Gold Coast
Junior World Cup
Runner-up	2019 Argentina

Sione Tui (born 8 July 1999) is an Australian rugby union player who plays for Stade Français. His position of choice is wing. At international level, he represented Australia Under-20s in the 2019 Oceania Rugby Under 20s Championship, in which Australia finished the tournament as champions.

== Super Rugby statistics ==
As of 16 June 2019

Season	Team	Games	Starts	Sub	Mins	Tries	Cons	Pens	Drops	Points	Yel	Red
2019	Rebels	0	0	0	0	0	0	0	0	0	0	0
Total		0	0	0	0	0	0	0	0	0	0	0
