= Donovan Taofifénua =

French rugby union player

- Born: 30 March 1999 (age 27) Grenoble, France
- Height: 1.79 m (5 ft 10 in)
- Weight: 84 kg (13 st 3 lb; 185 lb)

Rugby union career
- Position: Wing
- Current team: Racing 92
Amateur team(s)
Years	Team	Apps	(Points)
- US Mouguerre
2005–2010	Limoges		
2010–2013	JA Isle		
2013–2014	Limoges		
2014–2019	ASM Clermont		
Senior career
Years	Team	Apps	(Points)
2019–2020	ASM Clermont	1	(0)
2020–	Racing 92	80	(130)
- Correct as of 21 March 2025
International career
Years	Team	Apps	(Points)
2019	France U20	5	(14)
- Correct as of 1 December 2020

Donovan Taofifénua (born 30 March 1999) is a French rugby union player. He plays as a wing for Racing 92 in the Top 14. He is a cousin of France internationals Romain Taofifénua and Sébastien Taofifénua and is of Wallisian heritage.

== Career ==
Emerging from ASM Clermont Auvergne's rank, Taofifénua was a member of the France U20 team that won the 2019 World Rugby Championship, and made his club debut during the 2019–20 season.

He joined Racing 92 the next season, in search for more game time. There he scored six tries in the first part of the season, earning a first call-up for the French national team for the Autumn Nations Cup final against England.

== Honours ==
=== International ===
France (U20)

- World Rugby Under 20 Championship winner: 2019
