= Julien Delbouis =

French rugby union player

- Born: 4 August 1999 (age 27) Clamart, France
- Height: 1.84 m (6 ft 0 in)
- Weight: 105 kg (231 lb)

Rugby union career
- Position: Centre
Senior career
Years	Team	Apps	(Points)
2017–2018	Massy	11	(0)
2018–	Stade Français	60	(20)
- Correct as of 6 December 2020
International career
Years	Team	Apps	(Points)
2018–2019	France U20	9	(15)

Julien Delbouis (born 4 August 1999) is a French rugby union player. His usual position is centre or wing. Since 2018, he has played for Stade Français in the Top 14.

== Honours ==
=== International ===
France (U20)

- Six Nations Under 20s Championship winners: 2018
- World Rugby Under 20 Championship winners: 2019
