= Tomi Lewis =

Welsh rugby union player (born 1999)

- Full name: Tomi Lewis
- Born: 17 January 1999 (age 27) Brecon, Wales
- Height: 1.83 m (6 ft 0 in)
- Weight: 85 kg (13 st 5 lb; 187 lb)
- School: Llandovery College

Rugby union career
- Position(s): Fullback; Wing
- Current team: Scarlets
Senior career
Years	Team	Apps	(Points)
2017–2022	Llandovery RFC	26	(82)
2018–2022	Scarlets	2	(5)
2020	Ampthill	1	(10)
2022	Llanelli	1	(0)
2022–2023	Jersey Reds	22	(70)
2023–	Scarlets	10	(10)
- Correct as of 28 May 2024
International career
Years	Team	Apps	(Points)
2017	Wales U18		
2018–2019	Wales U20	9	(15)
- Correct as of 28 January 2024
National sevens team
Years	Team		Comps
2017–2018	Wales Sevens		9

Tomi Lewis (born 17 January 1999) is a Welsh rugby union player who plays for the Scarlets as a fullback or wing. Lewis has represented Wales 7s and Wales U20, most recently in the 2019 U20 Six Nations.

== Professional career ==
=== Scarlets ===
Lewis attended Llandovery College, and played for their rugby team, while part of the Scarlets academy. In 2017, Lewis was selected for Wales U18 on their tour to South Africa. Lewis was selected for Wales U20 for the 2018 Six Nations Under 20s Championship. He was again selected for the tournament in 2019, as well as for the 2019 World Rugby Under 20 Championship, scoring three tries.

In addition to representing Wales at U18 and U20 levels, Lewis has represented Wales Sevens at numerous events, making his debut in 2017 at age 18, on the Dubai leg, scoring seven tries. In total, he appeared in nine events for Wales Sevens.

While part of the Scarlets academy, Lewis also played for local club Llandovery RFC.

On 11 May 2018, Lewis made his debut for the Scarlets against the Dragons in the Anglo-Welsh Cup, starting at fullback and scoring a try.

In January 2020, Lewis joined Ampthill on loan, for the remainder of the 2019–20 season, making five appearances and scoring twice during his time with the club.

Lewis signed a new contract with the Scarlets in August 2020, but soon after suffered a serious knee injury in training. Lewis did not return to the field until January 2022, appearing for Llanelli and Llandovery after his recovery.

=== Jersey ===
Lewis was released by the Scarlets at the end of the 2021–22 season, and subsequently joined the Jersey Reds for the 2022–23 season. Lewis scored 12 tries during his one season with the club.

=== Return to Scarlets ===
On 25 April 2023, the Scarlets announced that Lewis would rejoin the club ahead of the 2023–24 season. Lewis made his league debut on 18 November 2023, starting against Leinster. He scored two tries in the 2024 Judgement Day fixture against the Dragons, before suffering an achilles injury that would rule him out of the first half of the 2024–25 United Rugby Championship.

Lewis made his comeback from injury featuring for the Carmarthen Quins on 7 February 2025, and made a return to the Scarlets to start against Ulster on 1 March 2025. Lewis signed a two-year extension with the Scarlets on 6 March 2025.
