= Angelo Davids =

South African rugby union player

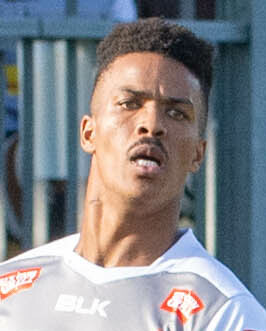
- Born: 1 June 1999 (age 27) Cape Town, South Africa
- Height: 1.78 m (5 ft 10 in)
- Weight: 84 kg (185 lb)
- School: Stellenberg High School, Bellville
- University: University of the Western Cape

Rugby union career
- Position: Wing
- Current team: Lions / Golden Lions
Youth career
- 2017–2018: Western Province
Senior career
Years	Team	Apps	(Points)
2020–2025	Stormers	37	(65)
2020–	Western Province	22	(65)
2025–	Golden Lions	9	(40)
2025–	Lions	20	(25)
- Correct as of 26 October 2026
International career
Years	Team	Apps	(Points)
2019–present	South Africa Sevens	48	(155)
2019	South Africa Under-20	5	(5)
- Correct as of 23 July 2022

Medal record

Men's rugby sevens

Representing South Africa

Commonwealth Games
Gold medal – first place	2022 Birmingham	Team competition

Angelo Davids (born 1 June 1999) is a South African rugby player for the Lions in the United Rugby Championship and in the Currie Cup. He is a former rugby sevens player for the South Africa national rugby sevens team, where his regular position was wing and back.

== Biography ==
Davids attended Stellenberg High School in Bellville, where he earned a selection into Western Province's squad for the 2017 Craven Week competition.

Davids joined the South African Rugby Sevens Academy in 2018, right after finishing school. He represented the South African Academy side in various tournaments in 2018 and 2019, and was selected to represent the senior side at the 2018 Hong Kong Sevens before withdrawing through injury.

After also playing for Western Province U19 in the 2018 Under-19 Provincial Championship, he was named in the Blitzboks squad for the 2019 Hong Kong Sevens, and he made his debut in their 22–7 victory over Japan in their opening match. He featured in all their matches in that tournament, as well as at the 2019 Singapore Sevens, where he scored his first try in their opener against Scotland, and another in the Cup final match against Fiji, which saw Davids being named as the Player of the Final in a 20–19 victory.

In 2022, He was part of the South African team that won their second Commonwealth Games gold medal.
