= Sanele Nohamba =

South African rugby union player

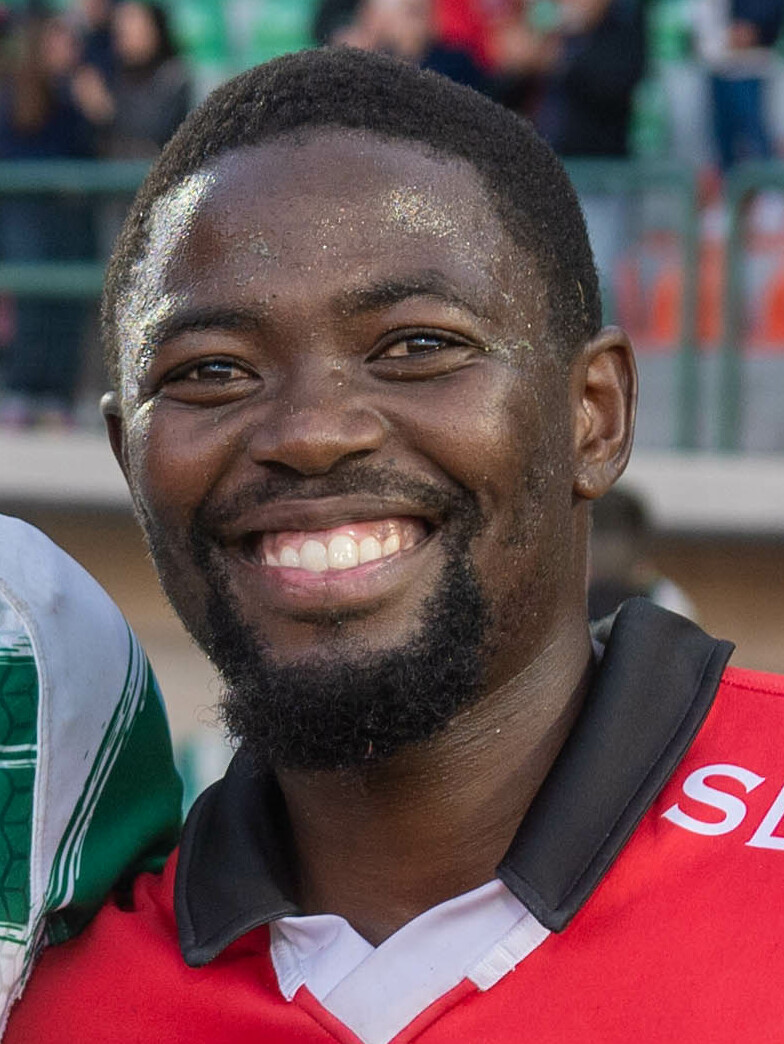
- Nohamba in 2023
- Born: 19 January 1999 (age 27) Alice, South Africa
- Height: 1.64 m (5 ft 4 1/2 in)
- Weight: 62 kg (137 lb)
- School: Durban High School

Rugby union career
- Position: Scrum-half / Fly-half
Youth career
- 2017–2019: Sharks (Currie Cup)
Senior career
| Years | Team | Apps | (Points) |
| 2019–2022 | Sharks (Currie Cup) | 24 | (60) |
| 2020–2022 | Sharks | 18 | (15) |
| 2022–2025 | Golden Lions | 12 | (81) |
| 2022–2025 | Lions | 49 | (267) |
| 2025–2026 | Shizuoka Blue Revs | 5 | (2) |
- Correct as of 16 September 2024
International career
| Years | Team | Apps | (Points) |
| 2016 | South Africa Schools 'A' | 3 | (5) |
| 2017 | South Africa Schools | 3 | (4) |
| 2019 | South Africa Under-20 | 5 | (33) |
- Correct as of 12 July 2019

Sanele Nohamba (born 19 January 1999) is a South African professional rugby union player who currently plays as a scrum-half for the Shizuoka Blue Revs in Japan Rugby League One. He joined the Blue Revs on 3 February 2025. He previously played for the Lions in the United Rugby Championship and the Currie Cup.

Nohamba represented South Africa Schools 'A' in 2016, South Africa Schools in 2017, and the South Africa Under-20 side at the 2019 World Rugby Under 20 Championship, where he scored 33 points through two tries, seven conversions and three penalties.

Nohamba made his Currie Cup debut for the Sharks in July 2019, coming on as a replacement scrum-half in their opening match of the 2019 season against Griquas.

On 5 May 2022, it was confirmed that Nohamba had signed for the Lions on a three-year contract.
