= JJ van der Mescht =

South African rugby union player

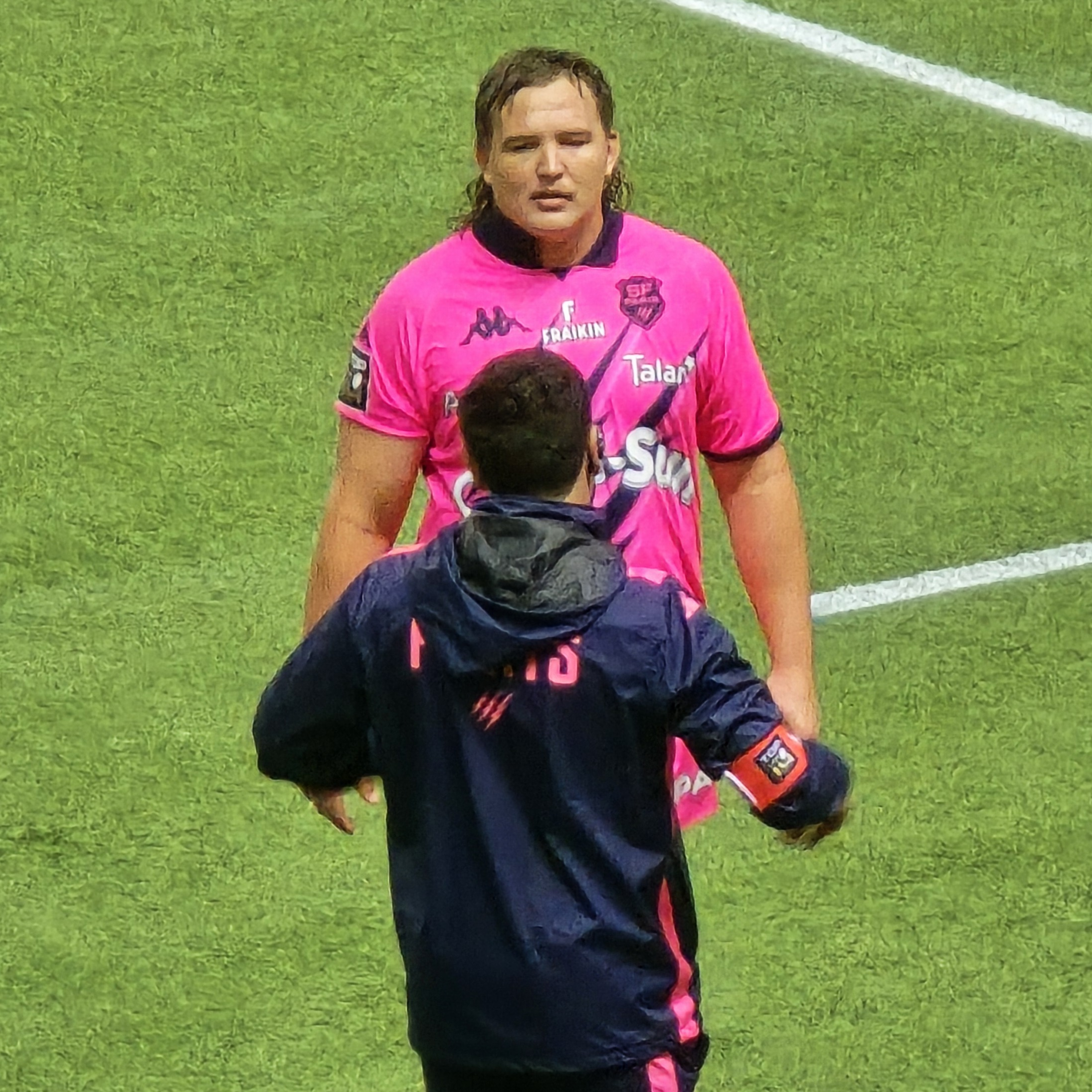
- Full name: Juan John van der Mescht
- Born: 4 May 1999 (age 27) Pretoria, South Africa
- Height: 2 m (6 ft 6 1/2 in)
- Weight: 145 kg (320 lb; 22 st 12 lb)
- School: Glenwood High School

Rugby union career
- Position: Lock
- Current team: Northampton Saints
Youth career
- 2014–2019: Sharks
Senior career
Years	Team	Apps	(Points)
2018	Sharks XV	4	(0)
2018–2021	Sharks (Currie Cup)	9	(5)
2019–2021	Sharks	10	(5)
2021–2025	Stade Français	44	(20)
2025–	Northampton Saints	12	(25)
- Correct as of 3 January 2026
International career
Years	Team	Apps	(Points)
2017	South Africa Schools	3	(0)
2019	South Africa U20	5	(15)
- Correct as of 11 August 2023

Juan John van der Mescht (born 4 May 1999) is a South African rugby union player for Northampton Saints in the English Gallagher PREM Rugby. His regular position is lock.

JJ is known for his powerful and aggressive style of play, this is helped by his intimidating stature and physical prowess.
