= Dewald Human =

South African rugby union player

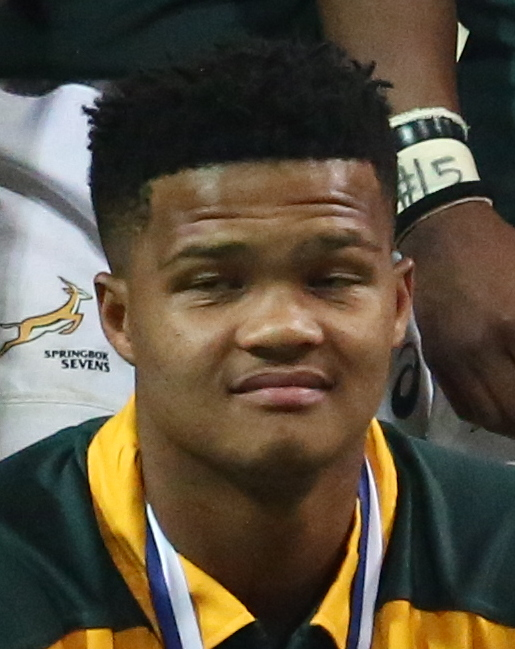
- Full name: Dewald Dawid Human
- Born: 19 May 1995 (age 31) Uniondale, South Africa
- Height: 1.68 m (5 ft 6 in)
- Weight: 70 kg (150 lb; 11 st 0 lb)
- School: Hoërskool Outeniqua, George

Rugby union career
- Position: Fly-half / Fullback
Youth career
- 2011–2013: SWD Eagles
- 2014–2016: Blue Bulls
Amateur team(s)
Years	Team	Apps	(Points)
2015	UP Tuks	8	(29)
Senior career
Years	Team	Apps	(Points)
2016	Southern Kings	3	(10)
- Correct as of 18 July 2016
International career
Years	Team	Apps	(Points)
2013	South African Schools	1	(7)
2017–present	South Africa Sevens	18	(66)
- Correct as of 14 November 2018
Medal record
Men's rugby sevens
Representing South Africa
Commonwealth Games
Gold medal – first place	2022 Birmingham	Team competition
Africa Men's Sevens
Silver medal – second place	2024 Mauritius	Team competition

Dewald Dawid Human (born 19 May 1995) is a South African rugby sevens player, currently playing with the South Africa national team. He can play as a fly-half or fullback.

== Rugby career ==
=== Youth rugby : SWD Eagles ===
Human was born in Uniondale, South Africa. He attended and played rugby for Hoërskool Outeniqua in George, which is situated in the SWD Eagles catchment area. In 2011, he was called up to represent the SWD Eagles' Under-16 team at the Grant Khomo Week tournament held in Queenstown. He was mainly used as a reserve, but scored one try in their 22–10 victory over the Blue Bulls.

In 2012, he represented the SWD Eagles at the premier high schools rugby union tournament in South Africa, the Under-18 Craven Week, held in Port Elizabeth. He was the starting fly-half for his side in all three matches; in the second of those – a 33–39 defeat to against Western Province – he scored two tries and kicked a conversion for a points haul of 12 points.

He was again selected in SWD Eagles' Craven Week side for the 2013 event held in Polokwane and scored a try in his first match, a 27–34 defeat to the Golden Lions. He converted five tries in his second match against Eastern Province in a 40–14 win and delivered an even better scoring performance in their final match, scoring one try, three penalties and four conversions for a personal points tally of 22 in a 37–29 victory over the Blue Bulls. His two tries and 27 points with the boot placed him in eleventh position in the points scoring charts for the tournament.

At the conclusion of the tournament, Human was also included in a South African Schools squad. He was named on the bench for their first match of the 2013 Under-18 International Series against England, but was not used in their 19–14 victory. He started their second match against of the series against France, kicking a penalty and two conversions in a 17–13 victory. He dropped down to the bench for their final match against Wales and did not appear in their 14–13 victory.

=== Blue Bulls / Tuks ===
After high school, Human moved to Pretoria, where he joined the Blue Bulls academy. He was included in the Blue Bulls U19 squad for the 2014 Under-19 Provincial Championship and immediately established himself as the first-choice fly-half for the team. He started nine of their twelve matches during the regular season, helping the team finish top of the log, winning nine of their matches. He scored his first (and second) try at this level in their Round Five match against trans-Jukskei rivals Golden Lions U19, also kicking eleven points to help his side to a 36–11 victory. His biggest contribution with the boot came in their Round Twelve match against Sharks U19, kicking four penalties and two conversions in a 50–25 victory. He started their semi-final match against the Sharks, scoring a try, a penalty and five conversions for a points haul of 18 points in a 43–20 victory, and also scored a try in the final against Western Province U19, but could not prevent his side losing 26–33 to the team from Cape Town. In total, Human contributed 115 points to the Blue Bulls' points total during the season, the third-most in Group A of the competition, behind Western Province's Ernst Stapelberg and the Sharks' Inny Radebe.

At the start of 2015, Human played Varsity Cup rugby with the Pretoria-based university side, UP Tuks. He was generally used as backup to Joshua Stander during the competition, but did start in their matches against CUT Ixias and UJ, making a total of eight appearances and scored 29 points, including a try in their 53–8 win over Maties. In the latter half of 2015, Human played in the Under-21 Provincial Championship with Blue Bulls U21. He made just five appearances, starting three of those, scoring just three points via a penalty in their match against Sharks U21 during the season.

=== South Africa Sevens / Kings ===
Human was contracted by the South African Rugby Union to join the South Africa Sevens Academy and was also named in an extended training squad as preparation for the 2016 Summer Olympics. However, he failed to make any appearances for the senior sevens squad during the 2015–16 Sevens World Series. On 5 May 2017, he was selected for the South Africa Sevens team to compete in the final two tournaments of the 2016–17 World Rugby Sevens Series in Paris and London.

He started training with Port Elizabeth-based Southern Kings during the 2016 Super Rugby season and was named on the bench for their Round Fourteen match against Argentine side the Jaguares.

In 2022, He was part of the South African team that won their second Commonwealth Games gold medal in Birmingham.
