= 2015 Under-21 Provincial Championship Group A =

- Countries: South Africa
- Date: 10 July – 24 October 2015
- Champions: Western Province U21
- Runners-up: Free State U21
- Relegated: N/A
- Matches played: 45
- Tries scored: 359 (average 8 per match)
- Top point scorer: Inny Radebe (135)
- Top try scorer: Daniel Maartens (10)

The 2015 Under-21 Provincial Championship Group A was contested from 10 July to 24 October 2015. The competition (also known as the ABSA Under-21 Provincial Championship for sponsorship reasons) was the top tier of 2015 edition of the Under-21 Provincial Championship, an annual Under-21 inter-provincial rugby union competition featuring fifteen South African provincial unions.

The competition was won by Western Province U21; they beat Free State U21 52–17 in the final played on 24 October 2015.

== Competition rules and information ==
There were seven participating teams in the 2015 Under-21 Provincial Championship Group A. These teams played each other twice over the course of the season, once at home and once away.

Teams received four points for a win and two points for a draw. Bonus points were awarded to teams that scored four or more tries in a game, as well as to teams that lost a match by seven points or less. Teams were ranked by log points, then points difference (points scored less points conceded).

The top four teams qualified for the title play-off semi-finals. The team that finished first had home advantage against the team that finished fourth, while the team that finished second had home advantage against the team that finished third. The final was played as a curtain raiser for the 2015 Currie Cup Premier Division final.

== Teams ==
Location of teams in the 2015 Under-21 Provincial Championship Group A

The following teams took part in the 2015 Under-21 Provincial Championship Group A competition:

2015 Under-21 Provincial Championship Group A teams
Team name	Stadium
Blue Bulls U21	Loftus Versfeld, Pretoria
Eastern Province U21	Nelson Mandela Bay Stadium, Port Elizabeth
Free State U21	Free State Stadium, Bloemfontein
Golden Lions U21	Ellis Park Stadium, Johannesburg
Leopards U21	Olën Park, Potchefstroom
Sharks U21	Kings Park Stadium, Durban
Western Province U21	Newlands Stadium, Cape Town

== Standings ==
The final league standings for the 2015 Under-21 Provincial Championship Group A were: (Note: There is a discrepancy with the result for the Round Three match between the Golden Lions U21 and Leopards U21 on the official South African Rugby Union website.Scoreboard The Final Score is given as 17–29 – which was also the result reported by the Golden Lions' official Twitter account – but the sum of the individual scores in the match add up to a 12–29 result. A third try for the Leopards U21s is seemingly missing from the match breakdown (this is also backed up by a 42nd-minute conversion being scored with no corresponding try), but has been included on this page. The tries for and tries against for the Golden Lions U21 don't correspond with the sum of tries in the match reports, plus the logs indicate that Leopards U21 got five four-try bonus points, while they only got four bonus points according to the match reports.)

2015 Under-21 Provincial Championship Group A standings
Pos	Team	P	W	D	L	PF	PA	PD	TF	TA	TB	LB	Pts
1	Western Province U21	12	10	1	1	451	267	+184	59	36	9	1	52
2	Free State U21	12	8	1	3	475	265	+210	68	36	9	2	45
3	Sharks U21	12	7	1	4	323	316	+7	39	43	6	1	37
4	Golden Lions U21	12	6	0	6	411	284	+127	56	36	7	4	35
5	Blue Bulls U21	12	6	1	5	353	376	−23	49	47	7	1	34
6	Leopards U21	12	2	0	10	262	501	−239	38	71	5	0	13
7	Eastern Province U21	12	1	0	11	208	474	−266	28	68	1	0	5

Legend and competition rules
Legend:
The top four teams qualified to the semi-finals.	P = Games played, W = Games won, D = Games drawn, L = Games lost, PF = Points for, PA = Points against, PD = Points difference, TF = Tries for, TA = Tries against, TB = Try bonus points, LB = Losing bonus points, Pts = Log points
Competition rules:
Play-offs: The top four teams qualified to the semi-finals, with the higher-placed team having home advantage. Points breakdown: * 4 points for a win * 2 points for a draw * 1 bonus point for a loss by seven points or less * 1 bonus point for scoring four or more tries in a match

=== Round-by-round ===
The table below shows each team's progression throughout the season. For each round, their cumulative points total is shown with the overall log position in brackets:

Team Progression – 2015 Under-21 Provincial Championship Group A
Team	R1	R2	R3	R4	R5	R6	R7	R8	R9	R10	R11	R12	R13	R14	Semi	Final
Western Province U21	1 (4th)	1 (6th)	6 (3rd)	10 (3rd)	15 (2nd)	19 (2nd)	24 (1st)	29 (1st)	34 (1st)	37 (1st)	42 (1st)	42 (1st)	47 (1st)	52 (1st)	Won	Won
Free State U21	5 (1st)	7 (2nd)	11 (2nd)	11 (2nd)	14 (3rd)	14 (5th)	19 (3rd)	21 (4th)	25 (3rd)	30 (2nd)	35 (2nd)	40 (2nd)	40 (2nd)	45 (2nd)	Won	Lost
Sharks U21	4 (3rd)	5 (4th)	5 (5th)	10 (4th)	10 (5th)	15 (4th)	19 (4th)	19 (5th)	19 (5th)	22 (5th)	26 (5th)	31 (3rd)	36 (3rd)	37 (3rd)	Lost	—
Golden Lions U21	5 (2nd)	10 (1st)	15 (1st)	16 (1st)	21 (1st)	21 (1st)	22 (2nd)	22 (3rd)	27 (2nd)	27 (3rd)	28 (3rd)	28 (5th)	30 (5th)	35 (4th)	Lost	—
Blue Bulls U21	0 (6th)	5 (5th)	5 (6th)	10 (5th)	13 (4th)	18 (3rd)	18 (5th)	23 (2nd)	23 (4th)	27 (4th)	28 (4th)	29 (4th)	34 (4th)	34 (5th)	—	—
Leopards U21	0 (5th)	5 (3rd)	5 (4th)	5 (6th)	5 (6th)	6 (6th)	6 (6th)	7 (6th)	7 (6th)	7 (6th)	7 (6th)	12 (6th)	12 (6th)	12 (6th)	—	—
Eastern Province U21	0 (7th)	0 (7th)	0 (7th)	0 (7th)	0 (7th)	0 (7th)	0 (7th)	4 (7th)	4 (7th)	4 (7th)	4 (7th)	4 (7th)	4 (7th)	5 (7th)	—	—
Key:	win	draw	loss	bye												

== Fixtures and results ==
The following matches were played in the 2015 Under-21 Provincial Championship Group A:

- All times are South African (GMT+2).

=== Round one ===
10 July 2015	Golden Lions U21	55–15	Blue Bulls U21	Ellis Park Stadium, Johannesburg
15:00	Try: Cyle Brink 9', 34'; Koch Marx 12'; Gerdus van der Walt 15'; Christiaan Meyer 27'; Rohan Janse van Rensburg 44'; Jano Venter 59'; Johan Esterhuizen 79'; Con: Brandan Hewitt 13', 16', 28', 44', 60', 80' (6/8); Pen: Brandan Hewitt 22' (1/2)	Report; Scoreboard	Try: Marquit September 67'; Dayan van der Westhuizen 74'; Con: Kobus Marais 67' (1/2); Pen: Joshua Stander 20' (1/1)	Referee: Lourens van der Merwe

11 July 2015	Free State U21	58–12	Eastern Province U21	Shimla Park, Bloemfontein
14:45	Try: Steven Meiring 11', 60'; Carel-Jan Coetzee 18'; Boela Venter 21'; Henry Immelman 52'; Jasper Wiese 56'; André Swarts 63'; Günther Janse van Vuuren 65'; Nico Lee 74'; Con: André Swarts 22', 53', 57', 64', 75' (5/9); Pen: André Swarts 33' (1/1); Cards: Daniel Maartens (yellow card) 49' to 59'	Report; Scoreboard	Try: Wynand Grassmann 68', 71'; Con: Malcolm Jaer 72' (1/2); Cards: CJ Velleman (yellow card) 14' to 24'	Referee: Tahla Ntshakaza

11 July 2015	Western Province U21	13–17	Sharks U21	City Park Stadium, Athlone
14:30	Try: Christo van der Merwe 76'; Con: Ernst Stapelberg 77' (1/1); Pen: Ernst Stapelberg 44', 63' (2/3)	Report; Scoreboard	Try: Riaan O'Neill 49'; Con: Rowan Gouws (0/1); Pen: Rowan Gouws 3', 62', 68', 72' (4/4)	Referee: Jaco Pretorius

Bye/s: Leopards U21

=== Round two ===
17 July 2015	Blue Bulls U21	24–23	Sharks U21	Loftus Versfeld, Pretoria
15:00	Try: Ganfried May 17'; Dayan van der Westhuizen 41', 79'; Marquit September 53'; Con: Joshua Stander 18' (1/2); Kobus Marais 80' (1/2)	Report; Scoreboard	Try: Rowan Gouws 46'; Dan du Preez 62'; Con: Rowan Gouws 47', 63' (2/2); Pen: Rowan Gouws 24', 30', 57' (3/3); Cards: Barend Potgieter (yellow card) 52' to 61'; Marius Louw (red card) 79'	Referee: Lourens van der Merwe

17 July 2015	Golden Lions U21	36–33	Free State U21	Ellis Park Stadium, Johannesburg
15:00	Try: JP du Preez 2'; Rohan Janse van Rensburg 15'; Christiaan Meyer 22'; Koch Marx 28'; Gerdus van der Walt 43'; Con: Brandan Hewitt (0/1); Kobus Engelbrecht 16', 23', 29', 44' (4/4); Pen: Brandan Hewitt (0/1); Shaun Reynolds 72' (1/1)	Report; Scoreboard	Try: Boela Venter 9'; Stephan Janse van Rensburg 39'; André Swarts 46'; Daniel Maartens 61'; Nico Lee 64'; Con: André Swarts 10', 40', 62', 65' (4/5); Pen: André Swarts (0/1)	Referee: Francois Pretorius

18 July 2015	Leopards U21	28–8	Eastern Province U21	Olën Park, Potchefstroom
13:00	Try: Jaco Hayward 17', 44'; Walt Steenkamp 38'; Jeandré Rudolph 57'; Con: Schalk Hugo 18', 39', 45', 58' (4/4)	Report; Scoreboard	Try: Malcolm Jaer 11'; Con: Simon Bolze (0/1); Pen: Simon Bolze 43' (1/1); Cards: CJ Velleman (yellow card) 35' to 45'	Referee: Rodney Boneparte

Bye/s: Western Province U21

=== Round three ===
24 July 2015	Sharks U21	15–27	Free State U21	Kings Park Stadium, Durban
15:00	Try: Inny Radebe 49'; Hyron Andrews 76'; Con: Inny Radebe 50' (1/2); Pen: Inny Radebe 24' (1/1)	Report; Scoreboard	Try: Jasper Wiese 6'; Daniel Maartens 19', 21'; Con: André Swarts 6', 19', 22' (3/3); Pen: André Swarts 26', 40' (2/2)	Referee: AJ Jacobs

24 July 2015	Leopards U21	17–29	Golden Lions U21	Olën Park, Potchefstroom
15:40	Try: Estehan Visagie 25' to be confirmed 41'; Dean Stokes 72'; Con: Schalk Hugo 42' (1/3)	Report; Scoreboard	Try: Cyle Brink 23'; Clinton Theron 39'; Bobby de Wee 49'; Gideon Koegelenberg 57'; Con: Shaun Reynolds 24', 40', 58' (3/4); Pen: Shaun Reynolds 5' (1/1); Cards: Bobby de Wee (yellow card) 63' to 75'	Attendance: 106; Referee: Jaco Pretorius

25 July 2015	Eastern Province U21	13–44	Western Province U21	Nelson Mandela Bay Stadium, Port Elizabeth
16:15	Try: Malcolm Jaer 10'; Somila Jho 74'; Con: Simon Bolze (0/2); Pen: Simon Bolze 2' (1/1); Cards: Jayson Reinecke (yellow card) 67' to 77'	Report; Scoreboard	Try: Johan Momsen 16'; Ryan Oosthuizen 26'; Leolin Zas 57'; Christo van der Merwe 62' penalty try 66'; Jason Worrall 78'; Con: Brandon Thomson 58', 63', 67', 79' (4/6); Pen: Brandon Thomson 9', 47' (2/4)	Referee: Lourens van der Merwe

Bye/s: Blue Bulls U21

=== Round four ===
31 July 2015	Eastern Province U21	20–39	Blue Bulls U21	Wolfson Stadium, KwaZakele
17:00	Try: Tyler Paul 46'; Lindelwe Zungu 79'; Con: Simon Bolze 47' (1/1); Malcolm Jaer 80' (1/1); Pen: Simon Bolze 21', 31' (2/2)	Report; Scoreboard	Try: Marco van Staden 38', 74'; Marquit September 57', 69'; Jixie Molapo 65'; Con: Kobus Marais 39', 58' (2/2); Joshua Stander 66', 70' (2/3); Pen: Kobus Marais 42', 45' (2/2); Cards: Matthys Basson (yellow card) 19' to 29'	Referee: Tahla Ntshakaza

1 August 2015	Sharks U21	46–24	Leopards U21	Kings Park Stadium, Durban
15:00	Try: Marius Louw 32'; Khulu Marwana 37'; Hyron Andrews 50'; Ayron Schramm 56'; Inny Radebe 68'; Lotter Pretorius 72'; Con: Inny Radebe 33', 38', 51', 73' (4/5); Rowan Gouws 69' (1/1); Pen: Inny Radebe 17', 26' (2/4); Cards: Rowan Gouws (yellow card) 22' to 33'	Report; Scoreboard	Try: Dalen Goliath 44'; Elden Schoeman 64', 77'; Con: Schalk Hugo 45', 65', 78' (3/3); Pen: Schalk Hugo 23' (1/1); Cards: DJ Putter (yellow card) 30' to 40'	Referee: Ben Crouse

1 August 2015	Western Province U21	24–19	Golden Lions U21	City Park Stadium, Athlone
16:00	Try: Leolin Zas 1'; Christo van der Merwe 11'; Justin Phillips 20'; Con: Jean-Luc du Plessis 2', 12', 21' (3/3); Pen: Grant Hermanus (0/1); Jean-Luc du Plessis 53' (1/2)	Report; Scoreboard	Try: Cyle Brink 4', 77'; Gerdus van der Walt 44'; Con: Brandan Hewitt 45' (1/2); Shaun Reynolds 78' (1/1)	Referee: Stephan Geldenhuys

Bye/s: Free State U21

=== Round five ===
8 August 2015	Eastern Province U21	14–73	Golden Lions U21	Nelson Mandela Bay Stadium, Port Elizabeth
11:30	Try: Lindelwe Zungu 58'; Davron Cameron 71'; Con: Simon Bolze 59' (1/1); Davron Cameron 72' (1/1)	Report; Scoreboard	Try: Brandan Hewitt 9'; Jano Venter 14', 79'; Christiaan Meyer 18'; Thabo Mabuza 38'; Bobby de Wee 40'; Ramone Samuels 51'; Rohan Janse van Rensburg 54', 81'; Koch Marx 66'; Dwayne Pienaar 77'; Con: Brandan Hewitt 10', 15', 19', 39', 52', 55', 67' (7/8); Shaun Reynolds 78', 80' (2/3)	Referee: Stephan Geldenhuys

8 August 2015	Free State U21	36–36	Blue Bulls U21	Free State Stadium, Bloemfontein
12:05	Try: Carel-Jan Coetzee 9'; Vuyani Maqina 37'; Henry Immelman 48'; Jasper Wiese 55'; Nardus Erasmus 69'; Con: André Swarts 10', 38', 70' (3/3); Henry Immelman 56' (1/2); Pen: André Swarts 74' (1/3)	Report; Scoreboard	Try: Kobus Marais 5', 17'; Dan Kriel 12'; Keanan van Wyk 63'; Marco van Staden 78'; Con: Kobus Marais 6', 18', 64' (3/4); Joshua Stander 79' (1/1); Pen: Kobus Marais 46' (1/1)	Attendance: 6,000; Referee: Rasta Rasivhenge

8 August 2015	Leopards U21	24–40	Western Province U21	Olën Park, Potchefstroom
13:50	Try: Francois Nel 24'; Akhona Nela 46'; Myburgh Briers 74'; Con: Schalk Hugo 25', 47', 75' (3/3); Pen: Schalk Hugo 40' (1/1); Cards: Zander Schlemmer (yellow card) 29' to 39'	Report; Scoreboard	Try: Rikus Bothma 9', 19'; Christo van der Merwe 30', 42', 55'; Leolin Zas 49'; Con: Jean-Luc du Plessis 10', 20', 31', 50', 56' (5/6); Pen: Jean-Luc du Plessis (0/1); Cards: Christo van der Merwe (yellow card) 15'	Referee: Ben Crouse

=== Round six ===
14 August 2015	Blue Bulls U21	41–31	Leopards U21	Loftus Versfeld, Pretoria
16:40	Try: Marquit September 7'; Heinrich Viljoen 30'; Jixie Molapo 36'; Ganfried May 39'; JP Smith 50'; Con: Joshua Stander 8', 31', 37', 40', 51' (5/5); Pen: Joshua Stander 56' (1/1); Kobus Marais 71' (1/1)	Report; Scoreboard	Try: Dean Stokes 20'; Myburgh Briers 25'; Jaco Hayward 48'; Stephan Malan 68'; Con: Schalk Hugo 21', 26', 49', 69' (4/4); Pen: Schalk Hugo 34' (1/1)	Referee: Sindile Ngcese

15 August 2015	Western Province U21	22–0	Free State U21	Newlands Stadium, Cape Town
12:45	Try: Grant Hermanus 46'; Paul Wipplinger 62'; Luke van der Smit 80'; Con: Jean-Luc du Plessis 47', 81' (2/3); Pen: Grant Hermanus (0/1); Jean-Luc du Plessis 36' (1/2)	Report; Scoreboard		Referee: AJ Jacobs

15 August 2015	Sharks U21	32–20	Eastern Province U21	Kings Park Stadium, Durban
14:45	Try: Alrin Eksteen 5'; Inny Radebe 8', 22'; Graham Geldenhuys 29'; Con: Inny Radebe 9', 23', 30' (3/4); Pen: Inny Radebe 60', 70' (2/2)	Report; Scoreboard	Try: Khaya Malotana 35'; Warren Swarts 54'; Anelisa Mteto 67'; Con: MC Venter 55' (1/3); Pen: MC Venter 7' (1/2)	Referee: Cwengile Jadezweni

Bye/s: Golden Lions U21

=== Round seven ===
22 August 2015	Leopards U21	7–55	Free State U21	Fanie du Toit Sport Ground, Potchefstroom
13:45	Try: Dolf van Deventer 2'; Con: Schalk Hugo 3' (1/1); Cards: Wilmar Arnoldi (yellow card) 10' to 20'	Report; Scoreboard	Try: Daniel Maartens 4', 11'; Stephan Janse van Rensburg 17'; Lorenzo Gordon 49'; Arrie Vosloo 60'; Jasper Wiese 65'; Donavan Gissing 70'; Con: Arrie Vosloo 5', 12', 18', 50', 61', 66' (6/6); Selvyn Davids 71' (1/1); Pen: Arrie Vosloo 38', 40' (2/2)	Referee: Francois Pretorius

22 August 2015	Sharks U21	20–19	Golden Lions U21	Kings Park Stadium, Durban
14:45	Try: Ayron Schramm 3'; Graham Geldenhuys 75'; Con: Inny Radebe 4', 76' (2/2); Pen: Inny Radebe 16', 66' (2/3); Cards: Sipho Mkhize (yellow card) 52' to 63'	Report; Scoreboard	Try: Victor Sekekete 26'; Aphiwe Dyantyi 53'; Rohan Janse van Rensburg 67'; Con: Brandan Hewitt 27' (1/2); Shaun Reynolds 68' (1/1); Pen: Brandan Hewitt (0/1); Cards: Clinton Theron (yellow card) 74'	Referee: Lourens van der Merwe

22 August 2015	Blue Bulls U21	22–51	Western Province U21	Loftus Versfeld, Pretoria
16:40	Try: Marco van Staden 9'; Jsuan-re Swanepoel 33'; Corniel Els 51'; Con: Joshua Stander 34' (1/2); Kobus Marais 52' (1/1); Pen: Joshua Stander 24' (1/1)	Report; Scoreboard	Try: Justin Phillips 16'; Chad Solomon 25'; Grant Hermanus 46', 58', 76'; Liam Hendricks 60'; Con: Jean-Luc du Plessis 59', 61' (2/5); Grant Hermanus 77' (1/1); Pen: Jean-Luc du Plessis 2', 22', 64' (3/3); Grant Hermanus 14', 31' (2/2); Cards: Jean-Luc du Plessis (yellow card) 69' to 79'	Referee: Jaco Pretorius

Bye/s: Eastern Province U21

=== Round eight ===
28 August 2015	Free State U21	35–38	Western Province U21	Free State Stadium, Bloemfontein
16:40	Try: Barend Bornman 33' penalty try 45'; Lorenzo Gordon 54'; Daniel Maartens 58'; Zee Mkhabela 78'; Con: Arrie Vosloo 34', 43', 55', 59', 79' (5/5); Cards: Lorenzo Gordon (yellow card) 17' to 27'	Report; Scoreboard	Try: David Ribbans 9'; Grant Hermanus 18'; Khanyo Ngcukana 24', 41'; Con: Brandon Thomson 10', 19', 42' (3/4); Pen: Brandon Thomson 17', 56', 69', 80' (4/4); Cards: David Ribbans (yellow card) 38' to 44'; Grant Hermanus (yellow card) 40' to 47'	Attendance: 500; Referee: Sindile Ngcese

29 August 2015	Leopards U21	33–55	Blue Bulls U21	Olën Park, Potchefstroom
12:30	Try: Gideon van der Merwe 11'; Dalen Goliath 36'; Estehan Visagie 44'; Myburgh Briers 46'; Gerhardus le Roux 51'; Con: Schalk Hugo 12', 37', 45', 52' (4/5); Pen: Schalk Hugo (0/2); Cards: Jeandré Rudolph (yellow card) 19' to 29'	Report; Scoreboard	Try: Arno van Wyk 7'; Ganfried May 16', 53'; Marquit September 17', 28'; Divan Rossouw 33'; Nqoba Mxoli 76'; Keanan van Wyk 78'; Con: Kobus Marais 17', 18', 29', 34', 77', 79' (6/8); Pen: Kobus Marais 69' (1/1)	Referee: Cwengile Jadezweni

29 August 2015	Eastern Province U21	25–15	Sharks U21	Nelson Mandela Bay Stadium, Port Elizabeth
14:30	Try: Franswa Ueckermann 36'; Somila Jho 53', 56'; Con: MC Venter 37', 54' (2/3); Pen: MC Venter 24' (1/1); Franswa Ueckermann 75' (1/1)	Report; Scoreboard	Pen: Inny Radebe 5', 9', 39', 46' (4/5); Rowan Gouws 70' (1/2)	Referee: Jaco Pretorius

Bye/s: Golden Lions U21

=== Round nine ===
4 September 2015	Blue Bulls U21	17–34	Free State U21	Loftus Versfeld, Pretoria
16:40	Try: Dan Kriel 19'; Joshua Stander 56'; Con: Kobus Marais 20' (1/1); Joshua Stander 57' (1/1); Pen: Kobus Marais 28' (1/2)	Report; Scoreboard	Try: Stephan Janse van Rensburg 46'; Justin Basson 49'; Nico Lee 58'; Con: Arrie Vosloo 50', 59' (2/3); Pen: Arrie Vosloo 16', 26', 30', 38', 70' (5/6)	Referee: Francois Pretorius

5 September 2015	Western Province U21	50–14	Leopards U21	Newlands Stadium, Cape Town
14:45	Try: Luke Stringer 3', 61'; Justin Phillips 33'; Rabz Maxwane 38', 77'; Kyle Whyte 42'; Khanyo Ngcukana 75'; Con: Brandon Thomson 4', 34', 39', 43', 76', 78' (6/7); Pen: Brandon Thomson 24' (1/1)	Report; Scoreboard	Try: Dean Stokes 56', 64'; Con: Myburgh Briers 57', 64' (2/2); Pen: Myburgh Briers (0/1); Cards: Francois Jacobs (yellow card) 78'	Referee: Rodney Boneparte

5 September 2015	Golden Lions U21	40–24	Eastern Province U21	Ellis Park Stadium, Johannesburg
16:45	Try: Ramone Samuels 4'; Aphiwe Dyantyi 14'; Cyle Brink 42'; Victor Sekekete 62'; Thabo Mabuza 67'; Gerdus van der Walt 79'; Con: Brandan Hewitt 5', 15', 43' (3/3); Shaun Reynolds 63', 68' (2/3); Cards: Pieter Jansen (yellow card) 82'	Report; Scoreboard	Try: CJ Velleman 6', 75'; Leighton van Wyk 51'; Con: MC Venter 7', 52', 76' (3/3); Pen: MC Venter 40' (1/2); Cards: Somila Jho (yellow card) 62'; Luvo Claassen (yellow card) 82'	Referee: AJ Jacobs

Bye/s: Sharks U21

=== Round ten ===
11 September 2015	Eastern Province U21	15–33	Free State U21	Nelson Mandela Bay Stadium, Port Elizabeth
16:30	Try: Somila Jho 7', 29'; Con: MC Venter 8' (1/2); Pen: Leighton van Wyk 24' (1/2)	Report; Scoreboard	Try: Steven Meiring 16', 34'; JC Fourie 42'; Stephan Janse van Rensburg 54', 65'; Con: Arrie Vosloo 17', 35' (2/2); Barend Bornman 43', 55' (2/2); Stephan Janse van Rensburg (0/1)	Referee: Archie Sehlako

12 September 2015	Sharks U21	32–32	Western Province U21	Kings Park Stadium, Durban
14:45	Try: Graham Geldenhuys 29'; Khulu Marwana 35'; Alrin Eksteen 37'; Marius Louw 80'; Con: Inny Radebe 30', 36', 81' (3/4); Pen: Inny Radebe 1', 8' (2/2)	Report; Scoreboard	Try: Luke Stringer 24', 50'; Khanyo Ngcukana 33'; Ryno Eksteen 65'; Con: Grant Hermanus 25', 51', 66' (3/4); Pen: Chris Smith 4' (1/1); Grant Hermanus 39' (1/3)	Referee: Cwengile Jadezweni

12 September 2015	Blue Bulls U21	16–6	Golden Lions U21	Loftus Versfeld, Pretoria
16:40	Try: Dan Kriel 76'; Con: Kobus Marais 77' (1/1); Pen: Joshua Stander 1', 26', 29' (3/3); Kobus Marais (0/1)	Report; Scoreboard	Pen: Shaun Reynolds 39', 50' (2/3)	Referee: Jaco Pretorius

Bye/s: Leopards U21

=== Round eleven ===
18 September 2015	Western Province U21	48–22	Blue Bulls U21	Newlands Stadium, Cape Town
16:45	Try: Grant Hermanus 12'; Leolin Zas 21'; Christo van der Merwe 30'; Ryno Eksteen 33'; Justin Phillips 42', 49'; EW Viljoen 68'; Con: Ernst Stapelberg 22', 34', 43', 50' (4/6); Ryno Eksteen 69' (1/1); Pen: Ernst Stapelberg 4' (1/1); Cards: Leolin Zas (red card) 58'	Report; Scoreboard	Try: Marquit September 6'; Nqoba Mxoli 26'; Kobus Marais 36'; Heinrich Viljoen 80'; Con: Kobus Marais 37' (1/3); Dewald Human (0/1); Cards: Chris Massyn (yellow card) 11' to 23'	Referee: Lourens van der Merwe

19 September 2015	Golden Lions U21	23–27	Sharks U21	Ellis Park Stadium, Johannesburg
12:00	Try: Gerdus van der Walt 56'; Jurie Linde 79'; Con: Brandan Hewitt 57', 80' (2/2); Pen: Kobus Engelbrecht 5', 9', 21' (3/3)	Report; Scoreboard	Try: Johan du Toit 6'; Neil Maritz 38'; Barend Potgieter 62'; Con: Inny Radebe 7', 39', 63' (3/3); Pen: Inny Radebe 12', 16' (2/2); Drop: Inny Radebe (0/2)	Referee: Francois Pretorius

19 September 2015	Free State U21	60–28	Leopards U21	Free State Stadium, Bloemfontein
13:00	Try: Joseph Dweba 5'; Steven Meiring 17', 27'; Boela Venter 43'; Daniel Maartens 50', 64'; Christiaan Erasmus 68'; Stephan Janse van Rensburg 70'; Ntokozo Vidima 75'; Stephen Rautenbach 79'; Con: Stephen Rautenbach 18' (1/3); Ruan Potgieter 44' (1/2); Henry Immelman 65', 69', 76' (3/5)	Report; Scoreboard	Try: Gene Willemse 30'; Estehan Visagie 40', 77'; Jaco Hayward 54'; Con: Myburgh Briers 31', 40', 55', 78' (4/4)	Referee: Stephan Geldenhuys

Bye/s: Eastern Province U21

=== Round twelve ===
25 September 2015	Sharks U21	29–23	Blue Bulls U21	Kings Park Stadium, Durban
17:45	Try: Neil Maritz 25'; Inny Radebe 49'; Ayron Schramm 60'; Marius Louw 73'; Con: Inny Radebe 50', 61', 74' (3/4); Pen: Neil Maritz 42' (1/1)	Report; Scoreboard	Try: Marquit September 14'; Dayan van der Westhuizen 34'; Jsuan-re Swanepoel 53'; Con: Joshua Stander 54' (1/3); Pen: Joshua Stander 39' (1/1); Dewald Human 78' (1/1)	Referee: Lourens van der Merwe

26 September 2015	Free State U21	30–17	Golden Lions U21	Free State Stadium, Bloemfontein
11:05	Try: Ox Nché 17'; Steven Meiring 42'; Carel-Jan Coetzee 55'; Daniel Maartens 68'; Con: Arrie Vosloo 18', 44' (2/4); Pen: Arrie Vosloo 11', 80' (2/4)	Report; Scoreboard	Try: Christiaan Meyer 24'; Ruan Ackermann 71'; Con: Brandan Hewitt 25' (1/1); Shaun Reynolds 72' (1/1); Pen: Brandan Hewitt 52' (1/1); Cards: Caswell Khoza (yellow card) 53' to 66'	Attendance: 800; Referee: Sindile Ngcese

26 September 2015	Eastern Province U21	16–24	Leopards U21	Nelson Mandela Bay Stadium, Port Elizabeth
12:45	Try: Sibusiso Ngcokovane 22'; Malcolm Jaer 65'; Con: MC Venter (0/2); Pen: MC Venter 10', 14' (2/3); Cards: Malcolm Jaer (yellow card) 26' to 36'; JP Jamieson (yellow card) 35' to 45'	Report; Scoreboard	Try: Estehan Visagie 7', 78'; Myburgh Briers 38'; Gene Willemse 68'; Con: Myburgh Briers 69', 79' (2/4); Pen: Myburgh Briers (0/1); Cards: Gideon van der Merwe (yellow card) 13' to 23'	Referee: Renier Vermeulen

Bye/s: Western Province U21

=== Round thirteen ===
2 October 2015	Golden Lions U21	38–44	Western Province U21	Ellis Park Stadium, Johannesburg
15:45	Try: Christiaan Meyer 5'; Jano Venter 24', 45'; Shaun Reynolds 38'; Con: Shaun Reynolds 6', 39', 46' (3/4); Pen: Shaun Reynolds 10', 28', 65' (3/3); Kobus Engelbrecht 80' (1/1); Cards: Cyle Brink (yellow card) 28' to 39'; Caswell Khoza (yellow card) 63' to 73'	Report; Scoreboard	Try: Khanyo Ngcukana 33', 60'; Johan Momsen 48'; Jarryd Sage 69'; EW Viljoen 78'; Con: Brandon Thomson 34', 49', 61' (3/3); Ryno Eksteen 70', 79' (2/2); Pen: Brandon Thomson 13', 27', 42' (3/4); Drop: Ryno Eksteen (0/1); Cards: Chad Solomon (yellow card) 51'	Referee: Lourens van der Merwe

2 October 2015	Blue Bulls U21	43–10	Eastern Province U21	Loftus Versfeld, Pretoria
16:40	Try: Dayan van der Westhuizen 3'; Duhan van der Merwe 11'; Joshua Stander 27'; Philip Orffer 34'; Dan Kriel 41'; Jason Jenkins 71'; Njabulo Gumede 79'; Con: Joshua Stander 4', 28', 35', 72' (4/6); Dewald Human (0/1)	Report; Scoreboard	Try: Malcolm Jaer 1'; Con: Leighton van Wyk 2' (1/1); Pen: Leighton van Wyk 4' (1/1); Cards: Leighton van Wyk (yellow card) 31' to 42'; CJ Velleman (yellow card) 32' to 42'; Jan Uys (yellow card) 77'	Referee: AJ Jacobs

3 October 2015	Leopards U21	12–45	Sharks U21	Olën Park, Potchefstroom
12:45	Try: Dolf van Deventer 57', 66'; Con: Gene Willemse 58' (1/1); Francois Nel (0/1); Cards: Francois Jacobs (yellow card) 45' to 55'	Report; Scoreboard	Try: Ayron Schramm 10'; Sias Koen 46'; Barend Potgieter 53'; Wian Vosloo 60'; Hyron Andrews 62'; Inny Radebe 69'; Graham Geldenhuys 73'; Con: Inny Radebe 47', 54', 61', 63', 74' (5/7)	Referee: Stephan Geldenhuys

Bye/s: Free State U21

=== Round fourteen ===
9 October 2015	Western Province U21	45–31	Eastern Province U21	Newlands Stadium, Cape Town
15:45	Try: Marcus Kleinbooi 6'; EW Viljoen 16', 31'; JD Schickerling 22'; Christo van der Merwe 28', 66' penalty try 52'; Con: Brandon Thomson 17', 23', 32', 53', 67' (5/7)	Report; Scoreboard	Try: CJ Velleman 9'; Warren Swarts 39'; Franswa Ueckermann 44', 65'; Wynand Grassmann 79'; Con: Leighton van Wyk 40', 45', 66' (3/4); Lindelwe Zungu (0/1); Cards: Stephan Ebersohn (yellow card) 48'; CJ Velleman (yellow card) 50'; Wynand Grassmann (yellow card) 57'	Referee: Stephan Geldenhuys

10 October 2015	Free State U21	74–22	Sharks U21	Free State Stadium, Bloemfontein
12:00	Try: Lorenzo Gordon 1', 20'; Ox Nché 3'; Jasper Wiese 6', 50', 75'; Henry Immelman 25'; Carel-Jan Coetzee 27'; Arrie Vosloo 34'; Daniel Maartens 45'; Justin Basson 47'; Conraad van Vuuren 56'; Con: Arrie Vosloo 2', 26', 28', 35', 46' (5/10); André Swarts 57', 76' (2/2)	Report; Scoreboard	Try: Ray Williams 16', 63'; Wian Vosloo 65'; Malcolm Cele 79'; Con: Colin Willemse 17', 80' (2/4)	Attendance: 200; Referee: Ricus van der Hoven

10 October 2015	Golden Lions U21	56–20	Leopards U21	Ellis Park Stadium, Johannesburg
13:45	Try: Shaun Reynolds 18', 64'; Jano Venter 24', 56'; Aphiwe Dyantyi 27', 82'; Cameron Rooi 35'; Victor Sekekete 78'; Con: Shaun Reynolds 18', 25', 28', 36', 57', 65' (6/6); Kobus Engelbrecht 79', 83' (2/2)	Report; Scoreboard	Try: Chriswill September 33'; Gideon van der Merwe 43'; Dalen Goliath 61'; Con: Myburgh Briers 44' (1/3); Pen: Myburgh Briers 9' (1/1)	Referee: Francois Pretorius

Bye/s: Blue Bulls U21

=== Semi-finals ===
17 October 2015	Free State U21	27–22	Sharks U21	Free State Stadium, Bloemfontein
13:00	Try: Steven Meiring 4'; Nico Lee 17', 67'; Arrie Vosloo 41'; Con: Arrie Vosloo 5' (1/3); André Swarts 68' (1/1); Pen: Arrie Vosloo (0/1); André Swarts 55' (1/1); Cards: Ntokozo Vidima (yellow card) 70'	Report; Scoreboard	Try: Ayron Schramm 22'; Graham Geldenhuys 34'; Con: Inny Radebe (0/2); Pen: Inny Radebe 2', 37', 61', 71' (4/4); Cards: Marius Louw (yellow card) 3' to 13'; Graham Geldenhuys (yellow card) 14'	Attendance: 200; Referee: Francois Pretorius

17 October 2015	Western Province U21	43–20	Golden Lions U21	City Park Stadium, Athlone
14:00	Try: EW Viljoen 15'; Luke Stringer 22', 53', 58'; David Ribbans 35'; Leolin Zas 54'; Con: Brandon Thomson 16', 23', 36', 54', 55' (5/6); Pen: Brandon Thomson 7' (1/2); Cards: Christo van der Merwe (yellow card) 73'; Liam Hendricks (yellow card) 75'	Report; Scoreboard	Try: Victor Sekekete 67'; Koch Marx 69'; Con: Shaun Reynolds 67', 70' (2/2); Pen: Shaun Reynolds 2', 19' (2/2); Cards: Christiaan Meyer (yellow card) 49' to 59'; Aphiwe Dyantyi (yellow card) 52' to 62'; Clinton Theron (yellow card) 55'	Referee: Lourens van der Merwe

=== Final ===
24 October 2015	Western Province U21	52–17	Free State U21	Ellis Park Stadium, Johannesburg
11:15	Try: Grant Hermanus 10'; EW Viljoen 19'; Brandon Thomson 60'; David Ribbans 65'; Leolin Zas 73'; James Verity-Amm 78'; Con: Brandon Thomson 11', 20', 61', 65' (4/5); Jean-Luc du Plessis 74' (1/1); Pen: Brandon Thomson 17', 28', 55', 57' (4/4)	Report; Scoreboard	Try: Ox Nché 23'; Steven Meiring 69'; Con: Arrie Vosloo 24' (1/1); André Swarts 69' (1/1); Pen: Arrie Vosloo 13' (1/1)	Referee: Cwengile Jadezweni

== Honours ==
The honour roll for the 2015 Under-21 Provincial Championship Group A was:

2015 Under-21 Provincial Championship Group A Honours
Champions:	Western Province U21
Top Try Scorer:	Daniel Maartens, Free State U21 (10)
Top Points Scorer:	Inny Radebe, Sharks U21 (135)

== Players ==
=== Player statistics ===
The following table contain points which were scored in the 2015 Under-21 Provincial Championship Group A:

All point scorers
No	Player	Team	T	C	P	DG	Pts
1	Inny Radebe	Sharks U21	6	24	19	0	135
2	Brandon Thomson	Western Province U21	1	30	15	0	110
3	Arrie Vosloo (Note: On the SARU points scorer page, Arrie Vosloo's are split; some of them are listed against Jacobus Vosloo. This is due to duplicate player profiles existing for the player. These have been added together in this list.)	Free State U21	3	24	10	0	93
4	Shaun Reynolds	Golden Lions U21	3	21	9	0	84
5	Kobus Marais	Blue Bulls U21	3	17	6	0	67
6	Joshua Stander	Blue Bulls U21	2	16	7	0	63
6	André Swarts	Free State U21	2	19	5	0	63
8	Brandan Hewitt	Golden Lions U21	1	21	2	0	53
9	Grant Hermanus	Western Province U21	7	4	3	0	52
10	Daniel Maartens	Free State U21	10	0	0	0	50
11	Schalk Hugo	Leopards U21	0	20	3	0	49
12	Steven Meiring	Free State U21	9	0	0	0	45
12	Marquit September	Blue Bulls U21	9	0	0	0	45
12	Christo van der Merwe	Western Province U21	9	0	0	0	45
15	Myburgh Briers	Leopards U21	4	9	1	0	41
15	Jean-Luc du Plessis	Western Province U21	0	13	5	0	41
17	Rowan Gouws	Sharks U21	1	3	8	0	35
17	Luke Stringer	Western Province U21	7	0	0	0	35
17	Jano Venter	Golden Lions U21	7	0	0	0	35
17	Jasper Wiese	Free State U21	7	0	0	0	35
21	Cyle Brink	Golden Lions U21	6	0	0	0	30
21	Stephan Janse van Rensburg	Free State U21	6	0	0	0	30
21	Khanyo Ngcukana	Western Province U21	6	0	0	0	30
21	EW Viljoen	Western Province U21	6	0	0	0	30
21	Estehan Visagie	Leopards U21	6	0	0	0	30
21	Leolin Zas	Western Province U21	6	0	0	0	30
27	MC Venter	Eastern Province U21	0	7	5	0	29
28	Graham Geldenhuys	Sharks U21	5	0	0	0	25
28	Rohan Janse van Rensburg	Golden Lions U21	5	0	0	0	25
28	Somila Jho	Eastern Province U21	5	0	0	0	25
28	Nico Lee	Free State U21	5	0	0	0	25
28	Christiaan Meyer	Golden Lions U21	5	0	0	0	25
28	Justin Phillips	Western Province U21	5	0	0	0	25
28	Ayron Schramm	Sharks U21	5	0	0	0	25
28	Gerdus van der Walt	Golden Lions U21	5	0	0	0	25
28	Dayan van der Westhuizen	Blue Bulls U21	5	0	0	0	25
37	Kobus Engelbrecht	Golden Lions U21	0	6	4	0	24
37	Malcolm Jaer	Eastern Province U21	4	2	0	0	24
39	Henry Immelman	Free State U21	3	4	0	0	23
40	Carel-Jan Coetzee	Free State U21	4	0	0	0	20
40	Aphiwe Dyantyi	Golden Lions U21	4	0	0	0	20
40	Lorenzo Gordon	Free State U21	4	0	0	0	20
40	Jaco Hayward	Leopards U21	4	0	0	0	20
40	Dan Kriel	Blue Bulls U21	4	0	0	0	20
40	Koch Marx	Golden Lions U21	4	0	0	0	20
40	Ganfried May	Blue Bulls U21	4	0	0	0	20
40	Victor Sekekete	Golden Lions U21	4	0	0	0	20
40	Dean Stokes	Leopards U21	4	0	0	0	20
40	Marco van Staden	Blue Bulls U21	4	0	0	0	20
50	Ernst Stapelberg	Western Province U21	0	5	3	0	19
50	Leighton van Wyk	Eastern Province U21	1	4	2	0	19
52	Franswa Ueckermann	Eastern Province U21	3	0	1	0	18
53	Simon Bolze	Eastern Province U21	0	2	4	0	16
53	Ryno Eksteen	Western Province U21	2	3	0	0	16
55	Hyron Andrews	Sharks U21	3	0	0	0	15
55	Dalen Goliath	Leopards U21	3	0	0	0	15
55	Wynand Grassmann	Eastern Province U21	3	0	0	0	15
55	Marius Louw	Sharks U21	3	0	0	0	15
55	Ox Nché	Free State U21	3	0	0	0	15
55	David Ribbans	Western Province U21	3	0	0	0	15
55	Dolf van Deventer	Leopards U21	3	0	0	0	15
55	CJ Velleman	Eastern Province U21	3	0	0	0	15
55	Boela Venter	Free State U21	3	0	0	0	15
64	Neil Maritz	Sharks U21	2	0	1	0	13
65	Gene Willemse	Leopards U21	2	1	0	0	12
66	Justin Basson	Free State U21	2	0	0	0	10
66	Rikus Bothma	Western Province U21	2	0	0	0	10
66	Bobby de Wee	Golden Lions U21	2	0	0	0	10
66	Alrin Eksteen	Sharks U21	2	0	0	0	10
66	Thabo Mabuza	Golden Lions U21	2	0	0	0	10
66	Khulu Marwana	Sharks U21	2	0	0	0	10
66	Rabz Maxwane	Western Province U21	2	0	0	0	10
66	Jixie Molapo	Blue Bulls U21	2	0	0	0	10
66	Johan Momsen	Western Province U21	2	0	0	0	10
66	Nqoba Mxoli	Blue Bulls U21	2	0	0	0	10
66	Barend Potgieter	Sharks U21	2	0	0	0	10
66	Ramone Samuels	Golden Lions U21	2	0	0	0	10
66	Elden Schoeman	Leopards U21	2	0	0	0	10
66	Jsuan-re Swanepoel	Blue Bulls U21	2	0	0	0	10
66	Warren Swarts	Eastern Province U21	2	0	0	0	10
66	Gideon van der Merwe	Leopards U21	2	0	0	0	10
66	Keanan van Wyk	Blue Bulls U21	2	0	0	0	10
66	Heinrich Viljoen	Blue Bulls U21	2	0	0	0	10
66	Wian Vosloo	Sharks U21	2	0	0	0	10
66	Ray Williams	Sharks U21	2	0	0	0	10
66	Lindelwe Zungu	Eastern Province U21	2	0	0	0	10
87	Barend Bornman	Free State U21	1	2	0	0	9
88	Davron Cameron	Eastern Province U21	1	1	0	0	7
88	Stephen Rautenbach	Free State U21	1	1	0	0	7
90	Ruan Ackermann	Golden Lions U21	1	0	0	0	5
90	Malcolm Cele	Sharks U21	1	0	0	0	5
90	Dan du Preez	Sharks U21	1	0	0	0	5
90	JP du Preez	Golden Lions U21	1	0	0	0	5
90	Johan du Toit	Sharks U21	1	0	0	0	5
90	Joseph Dweba	Free State U21	1	0	0	0	5
90	Corniel Els	Blue Bulls U21	1	0	0	0	5
90	Christiaan Erasmus	Free State U21	1	0	0	0	5
90	Nardus Erasmus	Free State U21	1	0	0	0	5
90	Johan Esterhuizen	Golden Lions U21	1	0	0	0	5
90	JC Fourie	Free State U21	1	0	0	0	5
90	Donavan Gissing	Free State U21	1	0	0	0	5
90	Njabulo Gumede	Blue Bulls U21	1	0	0	0	5
90	Liam Hendricks	Western Province U21	1	0	0	0	5
90	Günther Janse van Vuuren	Free State U21	1	0	0	0	5
90	Jason Jenkins	Blue Bulls U21	1	0	0	0	5
90	Marcus Kleinbooi	Western Province U21	1	0	0	0	5
90	Gideon Koegelenberg	Golden Lions U21	1	0	0	0	5
90	Sias Koen	Sharks U21	1	0	0	0	5
90	Gerhardus le Roux	Leopards U21	1	0	0	0	5
90	Jurie Linde	Golden Lions U21	1	0	0	0	5
90	Stephan Malan	Leopards U21	1	0	0	0	5
90	Khaya Malotana	Eastern Province U21	1	0	0	0	5
90	Vuyani Maqina	Free State U21	1	0	0	0	5
90	Zee Mkhabela	Free State U21	1	0	0	0	5
90	Anelisa Mteto	Eastern Province U21	1	0	0	0	5
90	Sibusiso Ngcokovane	Eastern Province U21	1	0	0	0	5
90	Francois Nel	Leopards U21	1	0	0	0	5
90	Akhona Nela	Leopards U21	1	0	0	0	5
90	Riaan O'Neill	Sharks U21	1	0	0	0	5
90	Ryan Oosthuizen	Western Province U21	1	0	0	0	5
90	Philip Orffer	Blue Bulls U21	1	0	0	0	5
90	Tyler Paul	Eastern Province U21	1	0	0	0	5
90	Dwayne Pienaar	Golden Lions U21	1	0	0	0	5
90	Lotter Pretorius	Sharks U21	1	0	0	0	5
90	Cameron Rooi	Golden Lions U21	1	0	0	0	5
90	Divan Rossouw	Blue Bulls U21	1	0	0	0	5
90	Jeandré Rudolph	Leopards U21	1	0	0	0	5
90	Jarryd Sage	Western Province U21	1	0	0	0	5
90	JD Schickerling	Western Province U21	1	0	0	0	5
90	Chriswill September	Leopards U21	1	0	0	0	5
90	JP Smith	Blue Bulls U21	1	0	0	0	5
90	Chad Solomon	Western Province U21	1	0	0	0	5
90	Walt Steenkamp	Leopards U21	1	0	0	0	5
90	Clinton Theron	Golden Lions U21	1	0	0	0	5
90	Duhan van der Merwe	Blue Bulls U21	1	0	0	0	5
90	Luke van der Smit	Western Province U21	1	0	0	0	5
90	Conraad van Vuuren	Free State U21	1	0	0	0	5
90	Arno van Wyk	Blue Bulls U21	1	0	0	0	5
90	James Verity-Amm	Western Province U21	1	0	0	0	5
90	Ntokozo Vidima	Free State U21	1	0	0	0	5
90	Kyle Whyte	Western Province U21	1	0	0	0	5
90	Paul Wipplinger	Western Province U21	1	0	0	0	5
90	Jason Worrall	Western Province U21	1	0	0	0	5
144	Colin Willemse	Sharks U21	0	2	0	0	4
145	Dewald Human	Blue Bulls U21	0	0	1	0	3
145	Chris Smith	Western Province U21	0	0	1	0	3
147	Selvyn Davids	Free State U21	0	1	0	0	2
147	Ruan Potgieter	Free State U21	0	1	0	0	2
–	penalty try	Western Province U21	2	0	0	0	10
–	penalty try	Free State U21	1	0	0	0	5
–	to be confirmed	Leopards U21	1	0	0	0	5
* Legend: T = Tries, C = Conversions, P = Penalties, DG = Drop Goals, Pts = Points.

=== Squads ===
The teams released the following squad lists:

2015 Blue Bulls U21 squad
Forwards
Backs

Calvonn Allison • Matthys Basson • Corné Cooper • Corniel Els • Aston Fortuin • Stefaan Grundlingh • Njabulo Gumede • Riekert Hattingh • Nico Janse van Rensburg • Jason Jenkins • Vuyo Khathide • Chris Massyn • Nqoba Mxoli • Menzi Nhlabathi • Abongile Nonkontwana • Le Roux Roets • Pierre Schoeman • Eli Snyman • Jsuan-re Swanepoel • Carel Swart • Jan van der Merwe • Dayan van der Westhuizen • Marco van Staden • Arno van Wyk • Johan van Wyk • Heinrich Viljoen • Did not play: • Johan Bannink • Jan-Henning Campher • Hanro Liebenberg • Brandon Meyer • Xander van Wyk

Wesley Cupido • Dewald Human • Dan Kriel • Adrian Maebane • Kobus Marais • Theo Maree • Duncan Matthews • Ganfried May • Jixie Molapo • Philip Orffer • Divan Rossouw • Peet Schoeman • Marquit September • JP Smith • Joshua Stander • Marcel Steyn-Scholtz • Duhan van der Merwe • Keanan van Wyk • Leighton van Wyk • Impi Visser • Did not play: • Tinus de Beer • Warrick Gelant • Jurie Linde • Lourens Pretorius • Ivan van Zyl • Kurt Webster • Lourens Weyer

2015 Eastern Province U21 squad
Forwards
Backs

Ronnie Beyl • Brandon Brown • Stephan Ebersohn • Wynand Grassmann • Jedwyn Harty • Justin Hollis • Andrew Hughes • Gerrit Huisamen • JP Jamieson • Kevin Kaba • Arno Lotter • Matthew Moore • David Murray • Tyler Paul • Jayson Reinecke • Jan Uys • Elandré van der Merwe • Cameron van Heerden • Kabous van Schalkwyk • CJ Velleman • Thembelihle Yase • Did not play: • Qhama Mvimbi • Philip Odendaal • Erwin Slabbert

Sam Bedlow • Simon Bolze • Davron Cameron • Luvo Claassen • Ivan-John du Preez • Riaan Esterhuizen • Malcolm Jaer • Somila Jho • Khaya Malotana • Anelisa Mteto • Mihlali Nchukana • Sibusiso Ngocovane • Luan Nieuwoudt • Jacquis Oosthuizen • Warren Swarts • Franswa Ueckermann • Leighton van Wyk • MC Venter • Lindelwe Zungu • Did not play: • Martin Keller • Rameez Nell

2015 Free State U21 squad
Forwards
Backs

Justin Basson • Joseph Dweba • WP Eloff • Nardus Erasmus • JC Fourie • Johann Grundlingh • Günther Janse van Vuuren • Johan Kotze • Willandré Kotzenberg • Daniel Maartens • Steven Meiring • Ox Nché • Fiffy Rampeta • SJ Roux • Francois Steyn • Conraad van Vuuren • Boela Venter • Reinach Venter • Ntokozo Vidima • Jasper Wiese • Did not play: • Gopolang Molefe • Rayno Nel • Daniel Nyamugama • Markus Odendaal • Petrus Senekal • Pieter Venter

Darren Baron • Barend Bornman • Carel-Jan Coetzee • Luke Cyster • Selvyn Davids • Carl Durow • Christiaan Erasmus • Donavan Gissing • TJ Goddard • Lorenzo Gordon • Henry Immelman • Stephan Janse van Rensburg • Gerrie Labuschagné • Nico Lee • Vuyani Maqina • Ali Mgijima • Zee Mkhabela • Sergeal Petersen • Ruan Potgieter • Armand Pretorius • Stephen Rautenbach • André Swarts • Louis Venter • Arrie Vosloo • Did not play: • Pieter Faber • Sechaba Matsoele • Johan Nel • Masego Toolo • Clinton Toua • Arno van Staden • Morné van Staden

2015 Golden Lions U21 squad
Forwards
Backs

Ruan Ackermann • Cyle Brink • CJ Conradie • Bobby de Wee • Gavin Delport • JP du Preez • Pieter Jansen • Gideon Koegelenberg • Kyle Kruger • Thabo Mabuza • Arnout Malherbe • Dwayne Pienaar • Le Roux Roets • Ramone Samuels • Pieter Scholtz • Victor Sekekete • Dylan Smith • Clinton Theron • Jano Venter • Steph Vermeulen • Did not play: • Derik Bezuidenhout • Estian Enslin • Marnus Erasmus • CJ Greeff • Ethan Louw • Malcolm Marx • FP Pelser • Vernon Petersen • Vean Roodt

Jamie Campbell • Steven du Plessis • Aphiwe Dyantyi • Kobus Engelbrecht • Johan Esterhuizen • Lungelo Gosa • Lloyd Greeff • Brandan Hewitt • Rohan Janse van Rensburg • Caswell Khoza • Jurie Linde • Devon Maree • Koch Marx • Christiaan Meyer • Godfrey Ramaboea • Shaun Reynolds • Cameron Rooi • Gerdus van der Walt • Did not play: • Keagon Gordon • Michal Haznar • Sampie Hearn • Warren Potgieter • Jade Solomons • Corné Vermaak

2015 Leopards U21 squad
Forwards
Backs

Wilmar Arnoldi • Tiaan Bezuidenhout • Jaco Botha • Thomas Dreyer • Roan Grobbelaar • JC Hulley • Francois Jacobs • Gerhardus le Roux • Mogau Mabokela • Stephan Malan • DJ Putter • Jeandré Rudolph • Zander Schlemmer • Roché Steenkamp • Walt Steenkamp • Gideon van der Merwe • Dolf van Deventer • Joshua van Niekerk • Estehan Visagie • Did not play: • Lourens Boddington • Heinrich de Jongh • Louis Grey • Funani Mabala • Janus Myburgh • Louis van der Westhuizen

Lourens Basson • Myburgh Briers • Sydney du Plessis • Dries du Plooy • Dalen Goliath • Jaco Hayward • Schalk Hugo • Luan Kleynhans • Alvino Montjies • Francois Nel • Akhona Nela • Lecander Sales • Elden Schoeman • Chriswill September • Dean Stokes • Gene Willemse • Did not play: • George-Lee Erasmus • Arthur Festus • Eugene Hare • Tokkie Kasselman • Bongani Mbongo

2015 Sharks U21 squad
Forwards
Backs

Hyron Andrews • Chris de Beer • Jean Droste • Petrus du Buson • Andrew du Plessis • Dan du Preez • Jean-Luc du Preez • Johan du Toit • Reyno du Toit • Thomas du Toit • Mees Erasmus • Graham Geldenhuys • Kyle Hatherell • Sias Koen • Ruan Kramer • Mzamo Majola • Mthunzi Moloi • Barend Potgieter • Ayron Schramm • Linda Thwala • Kerron van Vuuren • Wian Vosloo • Ray Williams • Did not play: • JP Grobler • Cohen Wortley

Matthew Alborough • Thobekani Buthelezi • Malcolm Cele • Michael Cloete • Marcel Coetzee • Alrin Eksteen • Kelvin Elder • André Esterhuizen • Jacques Fick • Rowan Gouws • Sandile Kubekha • Marius Louw • Retief Marais • Neil Maritz • Khulu Marwana • Nkululeko Mcuma • Sipho Mkhize • Nkululeko Ndlovu • Riaan O'Neill • Lotter Pretorius • Inny Radebe • Matt Reece-Edwards • Wion Robbertse • Colin Willemse • Did not play: • Josh Bragman • Merlyn Pieterse

2015 Western Province U21 squad
Forwards
Backs

Wesley Adonis • Rikus Bothma • Daniel du Plessis • Liam Hendricks • Johan Momsen • Devon Nash • David Ribbans • JD Schickerling • Hanno Snyman • Chad Solomon • Luke Stringer • Christo van der Merwe • Luke van der Smit • Kobus van Dyk • Burger van Niekerk • Frans van Wyk • Jacques Vermeulen • Kyle Whyte • Paul Wipplinger • Did not play: • Tahriq Allen • Michael Badenhorst • Francois Esterhuyzen • Wiehan Jacobs • Wayrin Losper • Wilco Louw • Jacques Oosthuizen • Alva Senderayi • Nyasha Tarusenga • Msizi Zondi

Daniël du Plessis • Jean-Luc du Plessis • Ryno Eksteen • SP Ferreira • Grant Hermanus • Marcus Kleinbooi • Jason Marcus • Sibahle Maxwale • Khanyo Ngcukana • Ryan Oosthuizen • Justin Phillips • Jarryd Sage • Chris Smith • Ernst Stapelberg • Brandon Thomson • James Verity-Amm • EW Viljoen • Jason Worrall • Leolin Zas • Did not play: • Siya Alam • Heinrich Buhr • Suwi Chibale • Dennis Cox • Keenan Jacobs • Gino Lupini • Dewald Naudé • Lester Phillips • Darryn Rix

=== Discipline ===
The following table contains all the cards handed out during the tournament:

Cards
Player	Team	Sent off (straight red)	Temporarily suspended
Marius Louw	Sharks U21	1	1
Leolin Zas	Western Province U21	1	0
CJ Velleman	Eastern Province U21	0	4
Francois Jacobs	Leopards U21	0	2
Caswell Khoza	Golden Lions U21	0	2
Clinton Theron	Golden Lions U21	0	2
Christo van der Merwe	Western Province U21	0	2
Wilmar Arnoldi	Leopards U21	0	1
Matthys Basson	Blue Bulls U21	0	1
Cyle Brink	Golden Lions U21	0	1
Luvo Claassen	Eastern Province U21	0	1
Bobby de Wee	Golden Lions U21	0	1
Jean-Luc du Plessis	Western Province U21	0	1
Aphiwe Dyantyi	Golden Lions U21	0	1
Stephan Ebersohn	Eastern Province U21	0	1
Graham Geldenhuys	Sharks U21	0	1
Lorenzo Gordon	Free State U21	0	1
Rowan Gouws	Sharks U21	0	1
Wynand Grassmann	Eastern Province U21	0	1
Liam Hendricks	Western Province U21	0	1
Grant Hermanus	Western Province U21	0	1
Malcolm Jaer	Eastern Province U21	0	1
JP Jamieson	Eastern Province U21	0	1
Pieter Jansen	Golden Lions U21	0	1
Somila Jho	Eastern Province U21	0	1
Daniel Maartens	Free State U21	0	1
Chris Massyn	Blue Bulls U21	0	1
Christiaan Meyer	Golden Lions U21	0	1
Sipho Mkhize	Sharks U21	0	1
Barend Potgieter	Sharks U21	0	1
DJ Putter	Leopards U21	0	1
Jayson Reinecke	Eastern Province U21	0	1
David Ribbans	Western Province U21	0	1
Jeandré Rudolph	Leopards U21	0	1
Zander Schlemmer	Leopards U21	0	1
Chad Solomon	Western Province U21	0	1
Jan Uys	Eastern Province U21	0	1
Gideon van der Merwe	Leopards U21	0	1
Leighton van Wyk	Eastern Province U21	0	1
Ntokozo Vidima	Free State U21	0	1
* Legend: (red card) = Sent off, (yellow card) = Sin-binned

== Referees ==
The following referees officiated matches in the 2015 Under-21 Provincial Championship Group A:

- Rodney Boneparte
- Ben Crouse
- Stephan Geldenhuys
- AJ Jacobs
- Cwengile Jadezweni
- Sindile Ngcese
- Tahla Ntshakaza
- Francois Pretorius
- Jaco Pretorius
- Rasta Rasivhenge
- Archie Sehlako
- Ricus van der Hoven
- Lourens van der Merwe
- Renier Vermeulen

== See also ==
- Currie Cup
- 2015 Currie Cup Premier Division
- 2015 Currie Cup qualification
- 2015 Currie Cup First Division
- 2015 Under-21 Provincial Championship Group B
- 2015 Under-19 Provincial Championship Group A
- 2015 Under-19 Provincial Championship Group B
