= Chad Solomon =

South African rugby union player

- Born: 23 February 1994 (age 32) Bellville, South Africa
- Height: 1.78 m (5 ft 10 in)
- Weight: 101 kg (15 st 13 lb; 223 lb)
- School: Paul Roos Gymnasium, Stellenbosch
- University: University of Cape Town

Rugby union career
- Position: Hooker
- Current team: Stormers / Western Province
Youth career
- 2007–2015: Western Province
Amateur team(s)
Years	Team	Apps	(Points)
2014–2015	UCT Ikey Tigers	15	(10)
Senior career
Years	Team	Apps	(Points)
2014–present	Western Province	55	(100)
2019–present	Stormers	10	(0)
2019	Southern Kings	1	(0)
- Correct as of 23 July 2022
International career
Years	Team	Apps	(Points)
2012	South Africa Schools	3	(0)
- Correct as of 18 April 2018

Chad Solomon (born 23 February 1994) is a South African rugby union player for the Stormers in Super Rugby and Western Province in the Currie Cup and in the Rugby Challenge. His regular position is hooker.

== Rugby career ==
=== 2007–2012 : Schoolboy rugby ===
Solomon was born in Bellville. He represented his local Western Province provincial union since primary school level, when he played at the Under-13 Craven Week tournament held in Krugersdorp in 2007. He progressed through the youth ranks, playing for Western Province at the Under-16 Grant Khomo Week in 2010 and at the premier high schools rugby union competition in South Africa, the Under-18 Craven Week, in both 2011 and 2012, scoring a try for Western Province in their match against the Blue Bulls in the latter tournament.

He was selected in a South Africa Schools team after the 2012 Craven Week and featured in all three matches in the Under-18 International Series held between South Africa and their counterparts from France, Wales and England.

=== 2013–2015 : Youth, Varsity Cup and Vodacom Cup rugby ===
Solomon joined the Western Province academy after school, and made eleven appearances for the Western Province U19 side in the 2013 Under-19 Provincial Championship. He scored tries against Free State U19 and Border U19 in a disappointing season which saw the defending champions failing to qualify for the semi-finals, finishing in fourth spot.

At the start of 2014, Solomon made seven appearances for the UCT Ikey Tigers in the 2014 Varsity Cup competition. The team won five of their seven matches during the regular season to finish in second place on the log. Solomon was an unused replacement as his side beat Western Cape rivals Maties 20–8 in the semi-final He came on for the final eight minutes of the final against NWU Pukke in Potchefstroom, where he was part of a comeback that saw UCT fight back from 33–15 down with five minutes to go to score a 39–33 victory, to win the competition for the second time.

In between playing Varsity Cup rugby, Solomon also made two appearances for Western Province in the 2014 Vodacom Cup; he came on as a replacement in against their defeat to the Sharks XV to make his first class debut and against the Border Bulldogs a fortnight later.

He was intermittently used by Western Province U21 during the 2014 Under-21 Provincial Championship, making six appearances during the regular season, starting three of those. His side finished top of the log, winning eleven of their twelve matches, and progressed to the final, where they lost to the Blue Bulls U21s.

He was the undisputed first choice hooker for UCT Ikey Tigers as they attempted to defend their title in the 2015 Varsity Cup; he started all seven of their matches during the regular season, scoring a try against the CUT Ixias in a 90–8 win as UCT finished in third spot to qualify for the play-offs. Solomon started their semi-final against UFS Shimlas in Bloemfontein and scored one of two tries in the match, but it proved to be futile, with the home team winning 21–10. At the conclusion of the competition, Solomon was included in a Varsity Cup Dream Team that played in a match against the South Africa Under-20 team.

He was also the first choice for the Western Province U21s during the 2015 Under-21 Provincial Championship, starting eleven of their fourteen matches, coming on as a replacement in one more match. He scored a try in a 51–22 victory over the Blue Bulls U21s as Western Province clinched top spot on the log. Solomon started their 43–20 win over Golden Lions U21 in their semi-final match, and also the final against Free State U21, which Western Province won 52–17 to secure the title.

=== 2016–present : Western Province ===
Solomon returned to first class rugby action in 2016, playing for Western Province in the 2016 Currie Cup qualification series. He made ten starts and three appearances off the bench in Western Province's fourteen matches, of which they won thirteen to top the log. Solomon had his most proficient try-scoring season of his career, scoring no less than six tries, against Griquas the Griffons, the Falcons, the SWD Eagles, the Boland Cavaliers and the Border Bulldogs, to finish as Western Province's joint-top try scorer with winger Khanyo Ngcukana.

Solomon was included in Western Province's Currie Cup squad for the 2016 Currie Cup Premier Division and named on the bench for their opening match of the season against the Blue Bulls. He made his Currie Cup debut by coming on for the final 25 minutes of a 26–45 defeat. However, Solomon suffered an ankle injury during the match and was ruled out for the remainder of the season.
