= Andrew Hughes (rugby union) =

English rugby union player (1995-)

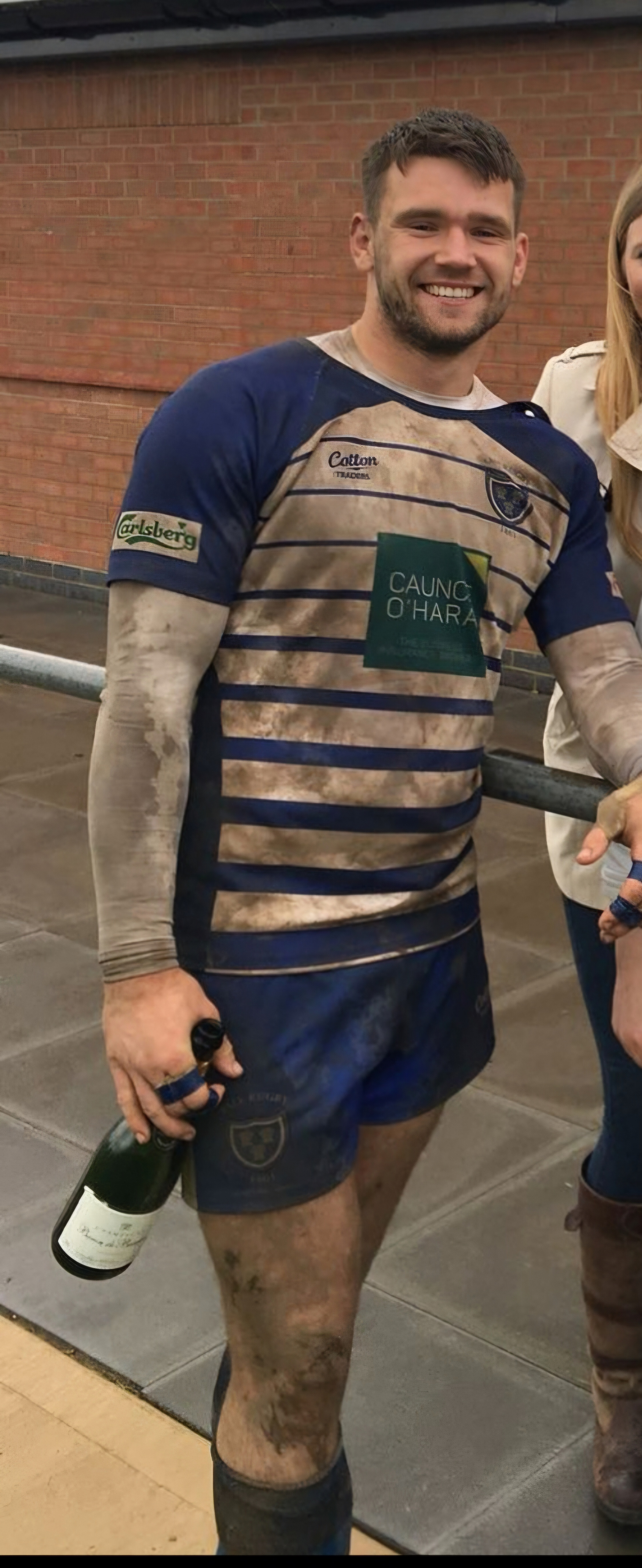
- Born: 27 June 1995 (age 31) Manchester, England
- Height: 1.90 m (6 ft 3 in)
- Weight: 108 kg (17 st 0 lb; 238 lb)
- School: Bolton School
- University: Hartpury College

Rugby union career
- Position: Lock / Back row
Youth career
- 2003–2013: Preston Grasshoppers
- 2013–2017: Sale Jets
- 2015: Eastern Province U21
Senior career
Years	Team	Apps	(Points)
2014–2017	Sale Sharks	8	(0)
2014–2015	→ Fylde	3	(0)
- Correct as of 7 June 2017
International career
Years	Team	Apps	(Points)
2012–2013	England Under-18		
- Correct as of 15 July 2015

Andrew Hughes (born 27 June 1995 in Manchester, England) is a rugby union player who most recently played for Sale Sharks. His regular position is in the back row.

== Career ==
=== Youth ===
At youth level, Hughes played rugby for Bolton School and also skippered Lancashire at various youth levels. He started his senior career at Preston Grasshoppers.

=== Sale Sharks ===
Hughes signed a two-year deal with Sale Sharks prior to the 2013–14 season, where he mostly played for their academy side, the Sale Jets. He made his first class debut for Sale Sharks on 10 October 2013 in their 2013–14 European Challenge Cup match against Biarritz, coming on as a replacement for the last five minutes of the match in a 33–10 victory. He was an unused replacement in their Challenge Cup match against fellow English side Worcester Warriors, but made his domestic debut against the same opposition, starting their 20–6 victory in the 2013–14 LV Cup in January 2014 and also played in their match against the Ospreys the following week.

In the 2014–15 season, Hughes made two further appearances for Sale Sharks in the LV Cup and also played in the European Rugby Champions Cup for the first time; he was an unused sub in their Round Three match against Saracens, but made his European Rugby Champions Cup debut the following week against the same opposition, coming on as a replacement in a 28–15 defeat. Hughes also featured in their final pool stage match against Irish side Munster.

During the 2014–15 season, Hughes also joined National League 1 side Fylde on a dual registration basis and made three appearances for the side. In July 2015, Hughes had a spell with South African side the Eastern Province Kings, representing their Under-21 side in the 2015 Under-21 Provincial Championship.

== Representative rugby ==
Hughes was a member of the England Under-18 squad that won the 2013 European Under-18 Rugby Union Championship in Grenoble, beating hosts France in the final.
