= Liam Hendricks =

South African rugby union player (born 1994)

- Full name: Liam Chad Hendricks
- Born: 31 May 1994 (age 32) Bellville, South Africa
- Height: 1.80 m (5 ft 11 in)
- Weight: 111 kg (245 lb; 17 st 7 lb)
- School: Paarl Boys' High School
- University: Stellenbosch University

Rugby union career
- Position: Prop
- Current team: Pumas
Youth career
- 2007–2015: Western Province
Amateur team(s)
| Years | Team | Apps | (Points) |
| 2014 | Maties | 7 | (0) |
Senior career
| Years | Team | Apps | (Points) |
| 2016 | Eastern Province Kings | 8 | (5) |
| 2016 | Southern Kings | 1 | (0) |
| 2016–2018 | Griquas | 31 | (5) |
| 2019 | Western Province | 4 | (0) |
| 2020 | Olimpia Lions | 1 | (0) |
| 2020– | Pumas | 8 | (0) |
- Correct as of 3 March 2021
International career
| Years | Team | Apps | (Points) |
| 2012 | South Africa Schools | | |
- Correct as of 19 May 2018

Liam Chad Hendricks (born 31 May 1994) is a South African rugby union player for Western Province in the Currie Cup and the Rugby Challenge. His regular position is prop.

== Rugby career ==
=== Western Province ===
As a scholar at Paarl Boys' High School, Hendricks was eligible to represent Western Province at youth level. He played for them at the Under-16 Grant Khomo Week held in Upington in 2010 and two years later, he played at the premier high school rugby union tournament in South Africa, the Under-18 Craven Week held in Port Elizabeth.

After finishing school, he joined the Western Province Institute and he was a key member of their Under-19 team that played in the 2013 Under-19 Provincial Championship, playing in all twelve of their matches during the competition, starting ten of those and scoring a try in an 18-all draw against Free State U19. It was a disappointing season for his team though, as they finished in fifth position on the log to miss out on a semi-final spot despite being the defending champions.

At the start of 2014, Hendricks represented the Stellenbosch-based Maties in the Varsity Cup competition. He played off the bench in all seven of their matches during the regular season as they qualified for the semi-finals by virtue of finishing in third place on the log. He was promoted to the starting line-up for the semi-final, but ended on the losing side as fellow Western Cape side UCT Ikey Tigers won the semi-final 20–8. In the second half of 2014, Hendricks was a member of the Western Province U21 team that ended the 2014 Under-21 Provincial Championship as losing finalists. Hendricks' involvement was limited, however, making just two appearances off the bench.

Hendricks had a far bigger role in the Western Province U21s' 2015 season though, appearing in all fourteen of their matches during the competition. He made three starts and nine appearances off the bench during the regular season, scoring a try in their 51–22 victory over Blue Bulls U21 in Round Seven of the competition. He helped Western Province to win ten of those matches to finish top of the log and qualify for a home semi-final against Golden Lions U21. He came on as a replacement in their 43–20 victory, as well as in the final, in which they beat Free State U21 52–17 to win the competition.

=== Eastern Province Kings ===
In 2016, Hendricks was signed by the Port Elizabeth-based Super Rugby franchise, the Southern Kings. He managed to play one game for the Southern Kings, starting against the Cheetahs in Bloemfontein in what is to be his only Super Rugby appearance thus far. They loaned him to the Eastern Province Kings Currie Cup side and he made his first class debut on 30 April 2016, starting their 31–18 victory over Namibian side the Welwitschias in Windhoek. Hendricks made his home debut a week later, starting for the Eastern Province Kings in their home match against the Blue Bulls, and he scored a crucial try on the half-hour mark to help his side to a 19–14 victory over the team from Pretoria.

=== Griquas ===
Hendricks moved to Kimberley during 2016 to join Griquas.
