= Jaco van der Walt =

Scotland international rugby union player

Jaco Van Der Walt
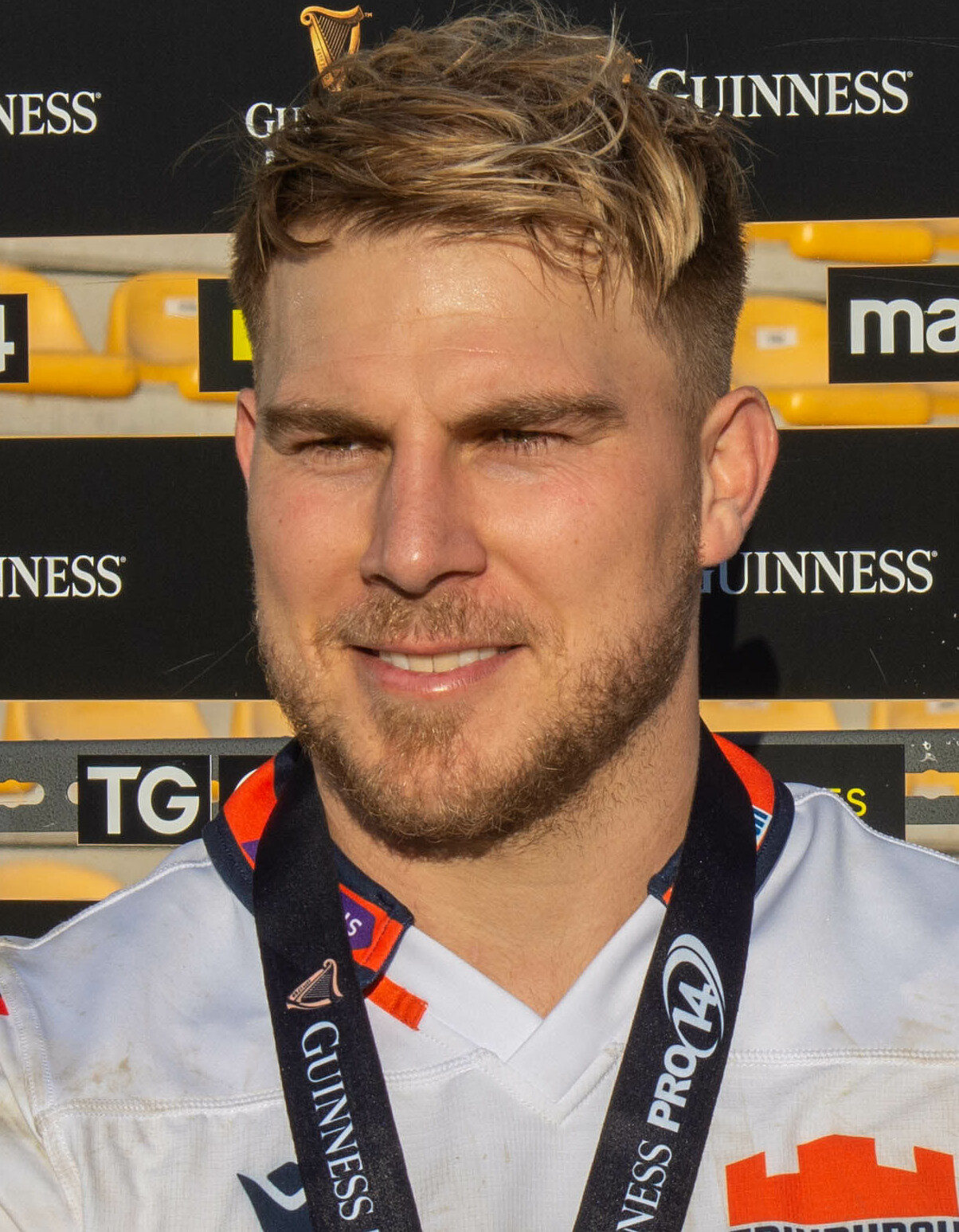
- Born: 1 February 1994 (age 32) Potchefstroom, South Africa
- Height: 1.82 m (5 ft 11 1/2 in)
- Weight: 92 kg (14 st 7 lb; 203 lb)
- School: Hoërskool Monument, Krugersdorp
- Notable relative: Gerdus van der Walt (brother)

Rugby union career
- Position(s): Fly-half, Fullback
- Current team: Bulls
Senior career
Years	Team	Apps	(Points)
2014–2017	Golden Lions	40	(206)
2014–2017	Golden Lions XV	5	(42)
2015–2017	Lions	22	(11)
2017–2023	Edinburgh Rugby	107	(469)
2023–	Bulls	13	(39)
- Correct as of 26 April 2023
International career
Years	Team	Apps	(Points)
2011–2012	South Africa U18		
2020–2021	Scotland	4	(11)
- Correct as of 13 April 2023

Jaco van der Walt (born 1 February 1994) is a South African-born Scottish rugby union player who currently plays for Bulls in the United Rugby Championship.

== Rugby Union career ==
=== Amateur career ===
He first represented the Golden Lions as early as primary school level, when he represented them at the Under-13 Craven Week competition in 2007. In 2010, he played at the Under-16 Grant Khomo Week competition and he played at both the 2011 and 2012 editions of the Under-18 Craven Week. He was also included in the South African Schools squad in both those seasons.

He then played for the Golden Lions U19 side in the 2012 and the 2013 Under-19 Provincial Championships, making just one appearance in each. Despite being eligible for the Under-19s, he represented the Golden Lions U21 for the majority of the 2013 season, starting in thirteen matches during the 2013 Under-21 Provincial Championship, scoring 17 points.

He also represented local university side UJ during the 2014 Varsity Cup competition, making 7 appearances.

=== Professional career ===
His first class debut for the Golden Lions came as a 20-year-old in the first match of the 2014 Currie Cup Premier Division. He was named on the bench for their season-opening match in a trans-Jukskei clash with the Blue Bulls. First-choice fly-half Marnitz Boshoff left the field ten minutes into the second half with a fractured arm, which led to Van der Walt's introduction. He kicked one conversion and two penalties as the Golden Lions ran out 41–13 winners.

In November 2017, Scottish Pro14 side Edinburgh announced that Van der Walt joined them on a two-and-a-half-year contract.

In January 2021, Van der Walt signed an undisclosed-length contract extension with Edinburgh, saying the capital club were "building a really strong side."

Van der Walt left Edinburgh in June 2023 to join the Bulls.

=== International career ===
He made his international debut for Scotland against Ireland, at the Aviva Stadium in Dublin, on 5 December 2020. He scored 3 penalties and 1 conversion in a match Scotland lost 16-31.

== Personal life ==
He is the older brother of Gerdus van der Walt. Both brothers came through the ranks at the Golden Lions and they played together on occasion; on 8 May 2015, both were selected in the starting line-up for the Golden Lions' match against the Griffons in Welkom, while they also played next to each other in the final match of the 2015 Currie Cup Premier Division regular season, in a match that saw Gerdus make his debut in the competition.

Jaco van der Walt’s grandfather was a detective in the Dutch police force before emigrating to South Africa.
