= Victor Sekekete =

South African rugby union player (born 1994)

- Full name: Victor Kutlwano Sekekete
- Born: 28 January 1994 (age 32) Johannesburg, South Africa
- Height: 1.96 m (6 ft 5 in)
- Weight: 101 kg (223 lb; 15 st 13 lb)
- School: Queens High School

Rugby union career
- Position: Flanker / Lock
- Current team: Cheetahs / Free State Cheetahs
Youth career
- 2012–2015: Golden Lions
Amateur team(s)
Years	Team	Apps	(Points)
2014	UJ	8	(0)
Senior career
Years	Team	Apps	(Points)
2015–2017	Golden Lions XV	14	(5)
2016	Golden Lions	3	(5)
2017–2018	Eastern Province Kings	2	(5)
2017–2018	Southern Kings	4	(0)
2019–2020	Griquas	17	(10)
2020–	Cheetahs	0	(0)
2020–	Free State Cheetahs	25	(10)
- Correct as of 10 July 2022
International career
Years	Team	Apps	(Points)
2014	South Africa Under-20	1	(0)
- Correct as of 17 April 2018

Victor Kutlwano Sekekete (born 28 January 1994) is a South African professional rugby union player for Griquas in the Currie Cup and in the Rugby Challenge. His regular position is flanker, but he also played as a lock earlier in his career.

== Rugby career ==
=== 2012 : Schoolboy rugby ===
Sekekete was born in Johannesburg, where he attended Queens High School. In 2012, he was selected to represent the Golden Lions at the premier rugby union competition for high schools in South Africa, the Under-18 Craven Week. He started all three of their matches as a lock, as his team qualified to play in the unofficial final match of the tournament, where they lost to Gauteng rivals the Blue Bulls.

=== 2013–2015 : Youth rugby ===
After school, Sekekete joined the Golden Lions academy. He featured in all fourteen of the Golden Lions U19 team's matches in the 2013 Under-19 Provincial Championship, starting thirteen of those and playing off the bench in the other. He scored three tries during the season – one against the Free State U19s and one in each of their matches against the Leopards U19s. The Golden Lions topped the log to qualify for the semi-finals, at which stage they beat Sharks U19 27–25, before losing 23–35 in the final against the Blue Bulls.

Sekekete started the 2014 season by playing in the Varsity Cup competition for UJ, being utilised as a flanker for the first time. He featured in all seven of their matches in a disappointing season that saw the team finish second-bottom of the log which meant they had to compete in a relegation play-off to retain their Varsity Cup status. Sekete started the play-off match in which UJ easily beat Varsity Shield runners-up UKZN Impi to remain in the top tier.

Sekekete was then included in the South Africa Under-20 squad that competed at the 2014 IRB Junior World Championship in New Zealand. He was not included in the squad for their opening match in Pool C, a 61–5 victory over Scotland, but played off the bench in their next match, a 33–24 victory over the hosts. He was named on the bench for their remaining three fixtures in the competition – a 21– win over Samoa to secure top spot in Pool C to qualify for the semi-finals, a 32–25 win over New Zealand in the semi-finals and a 20–21 loss to England in the final – but failed to get any game time in those matches.

Sekekete returned to domestic action by making twelve appearances for the Golden Lions U21 team in the 2014 Under-21 Provincial Championship. He scored two tries during the competition – both in a 113–3 victory over Border U21 – as the Golden Lions finished in third spot on the log before losing to the Blue Bulls in the semi-finals, the only match of the season that Sekekete did not feature in.

Sekekete made his domestic first class debut on 13 March 2015, appearing as a replacement in the Golden Lions XV's 31–21 victory over the Limpopo Blue Bulls, his only appearance in the competition. He again featured in every match for the Golden Lions U21 team in the 2015 Under-21 Provincial Championship. In his most prolific season so far in his career, he scored tries against the Sharks, Eastern Province and Leopards during the regular season, and another one in their 20–43 defeat to Western Province in the semi-finals of the competition.

=== 2016–present : Golden Lions ===
Sekekete's second taste of domestic first class action came in the 2016 Currie Cup qualification series for the Golden Lions XV, making two starts and coming on as a reserve in six matches, scoring a brace of tries in their final match in the competition, a 24–28 loss to the Boland Cavaliers in Grabouw.

Sekekete was included in the Golden Lions' Currie Cup squad for the first time for the 2016 season. He was named on the bench for their opening match of the season against the Pumas and made his Currie Cup debut by coming on for the final twelve minutes of a 68–26 victory.
