= Leolin Zas =

South African rugby union footballer (born 1995)

- Full name: Leolin Lucien Zas
- Born: 20 October 1995 (age 31) Worcester, South Africa
- Height: 1.84 m (6 ft 1/2 in)
- Weight: 93 kg (14 st 9 lb; 205 lb)
- School: Hermanus High School, Hermanus

Rugby union career
- Position: Winger / Centre
- Current team: Stormers / Western Province
Youth career
- 2013: Boland Cavaliers
- 2014–2016: Western Province
Senior career
| Years | Team | Apps | (Points) |
| 2015–2016 | Western Province | 10 | (30) |
| 2016 | Stormers | 15 | (40) |
| 2018–2019 | Sharks XV | 12 | (35) |
| 2018–2019 | Sharks | 5 | (10) |
| 2020– | Stormers | 89 | (180) |
| 2020– | Western Province | 5 | (15) |
- Correct as of 23 July 2022
International career
| Years | Team | Apps | (Points) |
| 2013 | South Africa Schools | 2 | (5) |
| 2015 | South Africa Under-20 | 5 | (10) |
| 2016 | South Africa 'A' | 2 | (2) |
- Correct as of 7 April 2018

Leolin Lucien Zas (born 20 October 1995) is a South African rugby union player for the Stormers in Super Rugby and in the Currie Cup and the Stormers XV in the Rugby Challenge. His regular position is winger and centre.

== Career ==
=== Youth / Boland / South African Schools ===
Zas was selected by the Boland Cavaliers to represent them at the Under-18 Craven Week competition held in Polokwane in 2013. He started three matches for them at outside centre and scored 18 points for his side, which consisted of one try in their match against hosts Limpopo Blue Bulls and 13 points with the boot. His performances were also noticed by the selectors of the South African Schools team and he made two appearances for them in the 2013 Under-18 International Series; he started both their 17–13 victory against France and match against Wales, as a try by Zas proved crucial in a 14–13 victory.

=== Western Province Under-19 / South Africa Under-20 ===
After high school, Zas joined the Western Province Rugby Institute and he represented Western Province U19 in the 2014 Under-19 Provincial Championship. Zas started eight of their twelve matches during the regular season and scored five tries – three of those came in a single match against Leopards U21, while he also scored against Free State U19 in both their home and away matches in the competition. Western Province finished in third spot on the log to qualify for the semi-finals, where they met the Free State U19s and Zas scored for a third time against the same opposition in a 29–22 victory in Bloemfontein. He also started the final, where Western Province became champions by beating the Blue Bulls U19s 33–26.

In 2015, Zas was selected a 37-man South Africa Under-20 training squad and started for them in a friendly match against a 2015 Varsity Cup Dream Team, scoring a try in a 31–24 victory. He was named in their squad to tour Argentina for a two-match series as preparation for the 2015 World Rugby Under 20 Championship. He started both their 25–22 victory over Argentina in the first match, and their 39–28 win in the second match four days later, scoring a second-half try for the visitors.

Upon the team's return, Zas was named in the final squad for the 2015 World Rugby Under 20 Championship. He started all three of their matches in Pool B of the competition; a 33–5 win against hosts Italy, a 40–8 win against Samoa which saw Zas score a try shortly after half-time and their final match against Australia, with Zas again on the scoresheet in a 46–13 win. The results meant that South Africa finished top of Pool B to qualify for the semi-finals with the best record in the pool stage of all the teams in the competition. Zas also started their semi-final match against England, but couldn't prevent them losing the match 20–28 to be eliminated from the competition by England for the second year in succession. He started their third-place play-off match against France, helping South Africa to a 31–18 win to win the bronze medal.

=== Western Province Under-21 / Currie Cup ===
Zas returned to domestic action by representing Western Province U21 in the 2015 Under-21 Provincial Championship Group A and he made his domestic first class debut – and his first appearance in the Currie Cup competition – after being named in the starting line-up for Western Province's final match of the 2015 Currie Cup Premier Division regular season against the Eastern Province Kings.

=== South Africa 'A' ===
In 2016, Zas was included in a South Africa 'A' squad that played a two-match series against a touring England Saxons team. He was named in the starting line-up for their first match in Bloemfontein, but ended on the losing side as the visitors ran out 32–24 winners. He also started the second match of the series, kicking one conversion in a 26–29 defeat to the Saxons in George.
