= David Ribbans =

England international rugby union player

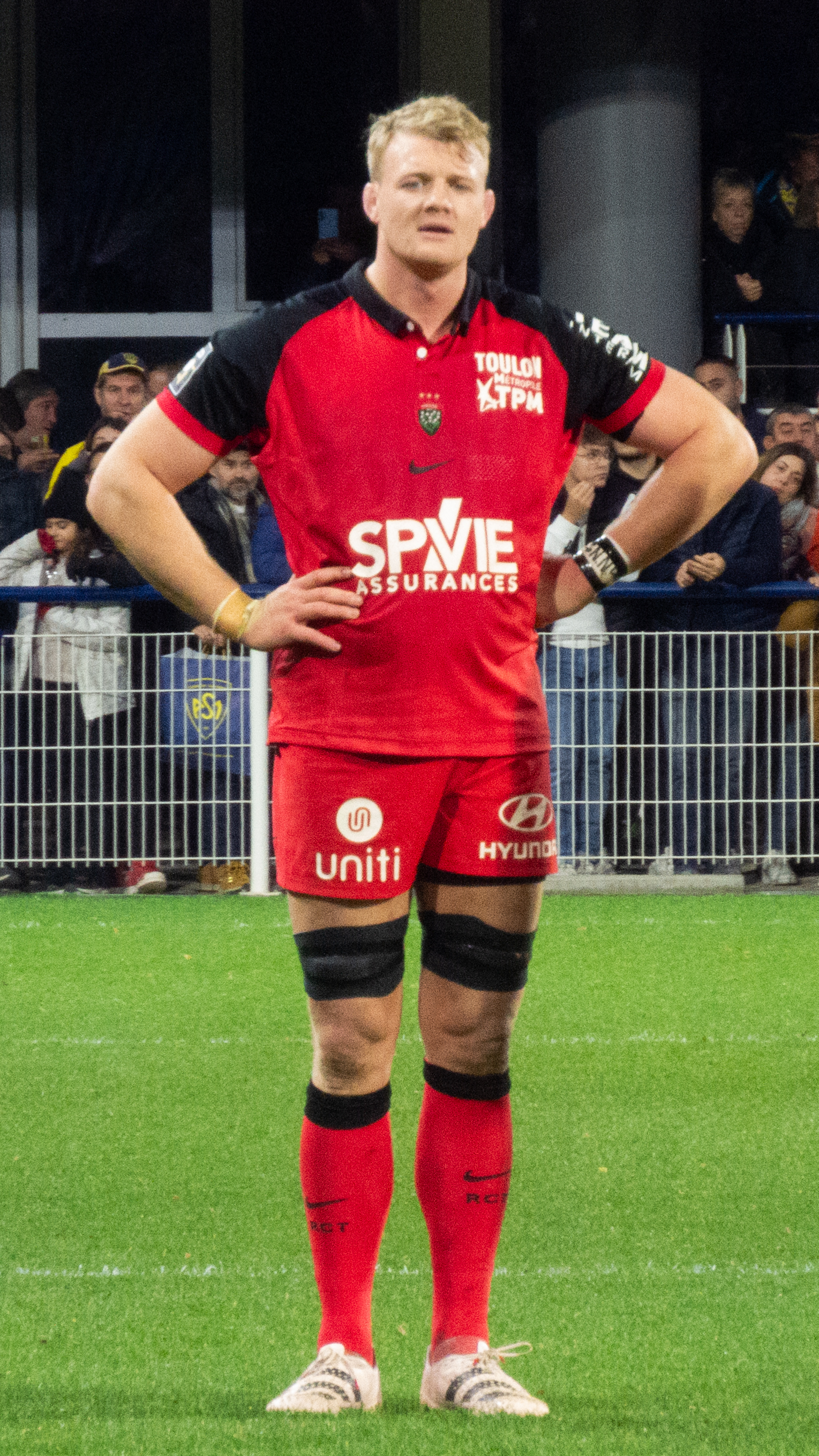
- Full name: David George Ribbans
- Born: 28 August 1995 (age 31) Somerset West, South Africa
- Height: 2.02 m (6 ft 8 in)
- Weight: 116 kg (256 lb; 18 st 4 lb)
- School: Somerset College, Somerset West

Rugby union career
- Position: Lock
- Current team: Toulon
Senior career
Years	Team	Apps	(Points)
2015–2016	Western Province	7	(5)
2017–2023	Northampton Saints	124	(95)
2023–	Toulon	53	(15)
- Correct as of 3 April 2024
International career
Years	Team	Apps	(Points)
2022–2023	England	11	(0)
- Correct as of 27 October 2023

David George Ribbans (born 29 August 1995) is a professional rugby union player who plays as a lock for Top 14 club Toulon. Born in South Africa, he represented England at international level after qualifying on ancestry grounds.

== Early life ==
Ribbans was born and grew up in Somerset West, Western Cape, South Africa.

== Club career ==
=== 2014–2016: Youth rugby / Western Province ===
He attended and played rugby at Somerset College, and, despite never being selected to play provincial rugby at schoolboy level, he joined the Western Province Rugby Institute after high school.

He was included in the Western Province U19 squad that participated in the 2014 Under-19 Provincial Championship. He didn't feature in the first seven rounds of the competition, but played off the bench in their next match against the Blue Bulls U19s before being promoted to the starting lineup for their next match against the Golden Lions U19s and remained in the starting lineup for the remainder of the competition. He scored a decisive try in their 21–20 victory over Eastern Province U19 as Western Province won nine of their twelve matches during the regular season to finish in third position on the log. Ribbans helped his side to a 29–22 victory over Free State U19 in their semi-final, and he won silverware the next week when Western Province beat the Blue Bulls 33–26 in the final in Cape Town.

At the start of 2015, Ribbans featured in a friendly match for Super Rugby franchise the Stormers against fellow side Western Cape side the SWD Eagles, and he also made his first class debut in March 2015, starting Western Province's 25–10 victory over another team from the Western Cape, the Boland Cavaliers, in Caledon in Round One of the 2015 Vodacom Cup, his only appearance in the competition. In the second half of 2015, he played for the Western Province U21 team in Group A of the Under-21 Provincial Championship, where he quickly became a key player, featuring in ten of their twelve matches during the regular season. He scored a try against Free State U21 as Western Province finished top of the log, winning ten of their matches. Ribbans started their semi-final match against the Golden Lions and scored a try five minutes before half time as his side ran out 43–20 winners. He scored his third try of the season in the final, scoring Western Province's fourth of six tries in a 52–17 victory over the Free State U21s in Johannesburg to win a youth competition for the second season in a row.

At the start of 2016, Ribbans was named in the Stormers squad for the 2016 Super Rugby season, but didn't feature in any of their matches. He played in four matches for a Western Province team that finished top of the 2016 Currie Cup qualification series, winning thirteen out of their fourteen matches. He once again reverted to the Western Province U21 side in the second half of the season, scoring a try against Sharks U21 in one of his six appearances in the 2016 Under-21 Provincial Championship. He also made his debut in the Currie Cup Premier Division in 2016, coming on as a replacement in their 52–31 victory over Griquas in Kimberley. He made a second appearance off the bench a week later against the Boland Cavaliers, scoring his first try in first class rugby. It proved to be a vital try for Western Province who were 28–20 down at the time in a match they had to win to ensure qualification to the semi-finals, with fly-half Robert du Preez's subsequent conversion and penalty five minutes later enough to secure third place on the log for Ribbans' team. Despite this, Ribbans didn't feature in their semi-final against the Blue Bulls, which Western Province lost 30–36 to be eliminated from the competition.

=== 2017–2023: Northampton Saints ===
After the 2016 season, Ribbans moved to England to join Premiership side Northampton Saints, with the team announcing his signing on 5 January 2017. Starting his first game in a Saints shirt in a friendly against Bedford Blues, Ribbans quickly established himself as a first-team contender with a hat trick against the RFU Championship side.

Ribbans progressed into the first team, earning over 100 appearances for Saints and proving to be a favourite with the supporters for his high work-rate and big hits. His last appearance for Northampton came in a league semi-final which saw them eliminated by champions Saracens.

=== 2023–present: Toulon ===
Ribbans joined Toulon for the 2023–24 Top 14 season.

== International career ==
In October 2020 Ribbans was called up to a senior England training squad by head coach Eddie Jones. On 12 November 2022 he made his Test debut starting in a victory against Japan. He then played in their next game which saw England draw with New Zealand.

New coach Steve Borthwick included Ribbans in the squad for the 2023 Rugby World Cup and he featured in three of their four warm-up matches and started in the pool stage game against Chile. He did not participate in the quarter or semi-final but did come off the bench in their last fixture of the tournament as England defeated Argentina to finish third and claim a bronze medal.
