= Bobby de Wee =

South African rugby union player

- Full name: Arthur Bobby de Wee
- Born: 4 February 1994 (age 32) Klerksdorp, South Africa
- Height: 1.98 m (6 ft 6 in)
- Weight: 121 kg (267 lb; 19 st 1 lb)
- School: Southdowns College, Centurion
- University: University of Pretoria
- Notable relative: Roseli Acosta (wife)

Rugby union career
- Position: Lock / Flanker
- Current team: Ealing Trailfinders
Youth career
- 2010: Leopards
- 2011–2013: Blue Bulls
- 2014–2015: Golden Lions
Senior career
Years	Team	Apps	(Points)
2014–2017	Golden Lions XV	29	(35)
2015–2017	Golden Lions	9	(0)
2017–2021	Southern Kings	39	(10)
2021–	Ealing Trailfinders	96	(95)
- Correct as of 12 October 2026

Arthur Bobby de Wee (born 4 February 1994) is a South African rugby union player for the Ealing Trailfinders in the RFU Championship.

== Career ==
=== Youth: Leopards and Blue Bulls ===
In 2010, De Wee was called up to represent the Leopards at the Under-16 Grant Khomo Week held in Upington. He moved to Centurion the following year, resulting in him then representing the Blue Bulls at the Under-18 Craven Week tournaments in both 2011 and 2012.

De Wee also represented the Blue Bulls after finishing school, making seven appearances for the Blue Bulls U19 side in the 2013 Under-19 Provincial Championship, in a season that saw them win all twelve of their matches in the regular season of the competition. De Wee didn't feature in the title play-offs as the Blue Bulls won the competition, beating the Golden Lions U19s 35–23 in the final.

=== Golden Lions ===
De Wee then made the short move to Johannesburg to join the Golden Lions prior to the 2014 season. He made his first class debut by playing off the bench in their 23–22 victory over the Falcons in the 2014 Vodacom Cup. After another appearance as a replacement in their next match against his former side the Blue Bulls, De Wee started his first match in an 18–33 defeat to Griquas in Kimberley. His fourth appearance in the competition came in the Golden Lions' 110–0 victory over the Limpopo Blue Bulls as the Golden Lions finished in fourth spot in the Northern Section to qualify for the quarter-finals. De Wee wasn't involved in the play-offs, as the Golden Lions went all the way to the final, which they lost 6–30 to Griquas.

Despite still being at Under-20 age-level, De Wee was a key player for the Golden Lions U21s in the 2014 Under-21 Provincial Championship, starting all twelve of their matches in the regular season. He scored three tries during the season – two in their 113–3 over Border U21 and another in their 31–50 defeat to Western Province a week later – to help the Golden Lions finish in third spot on the log. He appeared as a replacement in their semi-final match with the Blue Bulls U21, but could not prevent them losing 19–23 to be knocked out of the competition.

De Wee returned to first class action in the 2015 Vodacom Cup, starting all but one of the Golden Lions' matches in the competition. He scored two of the Golden Lions' eight tries in a 53–3 victory over Namibian side Welwitschias in Windhoek on the opening day of the competition and helped the Golden Lions to finish top of the Northern Section log, winning all seven of their matches. He also started their 29–21 win over the SWD Eagles in their quarter final match and their 20–43 defeat to the Pumas in the semi-final of the competition. He once again represented the Golden Lions U21s in the 2015 Under-21 Provincial Championship Group A, scoring tries in matches against the Leopards U21s and Eastern Province U21s as they secured a semi-final place by finishing in fourth spot.

In October, he was included in the starting line-up for the Golden Lions in their final match of the 2015 Currie Cup Premier Division season, against Griquas in Johannesburg, and subsequently made his Currie Cup debut, playing the first 69 minutes of a 29–19 victory to help the Golden Lions retain their unbeaten record in the competition.

=== Southern Kings ===
In 2017, he signed with Pro14 side Southern Kings.

=== Ealing Trailfinders ===
In December 2020, Bobby traveled to England to join RFU Championship side Ealing Trailfinders for the 2020–21 season.

Having arrived during the COVID lockdowns it took a while for the Ealing supporters to get a glimpse of the man who would become a firm favourite at Vallis Way.

Season 2020/21 was another season shorted by COVID and had a revised schedule where each team only played the other once with a two legged playoff at the end to decide the Champions. It was also made interesting by the demotion of Saracens and all their International stars into the Championship.

Prior to the league season there was a televised 3 team pre season competition called the Trailfinders Challenge Cup featuring Ealing Trailfinders, Saracens and Doncaster Knights. Ealing won the competition winning all four games. Bobby started all four games with his first game in Trailfinders colours coming in the home game against Saracens on 16 January 2021. He followed up with his first try for the club away to Doncaster Knights and in the return fixture he picked up his first yellow card for the club.

During the following Championship Season Ealing topped the table winning nine of the ten games and ending up 5 points clear of second place Saracens. Of those ten games Bobby started 8 scoring. The two legged playoff however was a different kettle of fish with Saracens fielding a strong squad featuring several British & Irish Lions and World Cup Winners winning both games easily.

Season 2021/22 finally saw a return to full time rugby and was a hugely successful for Ealing Trailfinders with the club winning a League and Cup Double.

Ealing started the Championship season strongly with a 54–20 win against Hartpury RFC with Bobby in the starting No. 4 shirt. After a defeat away to Cornish Pirates Ealing went on a run of 9 wins from 10 games. The season ended with four straight wins that took Ealing to the title finishing off with a 60–10 home win. In all Bobby played in all 20 games starting 17. He scored tries against Hartpury (H) and Cornish Pirates (H).

The Championship Cup took place after the Championship season was completed. The club made the decision to use this as more of a development tournament and as a result Bobby was rested.

Season 2022/23 was a very hard-fought season between Jersey Reds and Ealing Trailfinders with Jersey winning the Championship and Ealing winning the Championship Cup. Ealing started the Championship season well winning their first ten games. Bobby started the first seven games but after a break for the Championship Cup he stayed on the bench. One of those games was a shock defeat away to Caldy RFC. Bobby earned his starting shirt back for the 26–13 home win over Hartpury RFC however in the following home game against Coventry he received his first red card for Ealing for an accidental head on head collision. This cost him his Championship place for the rest of the season only making one substitute appearance in the final game away to Doncaster, a game where he scored two tries.

Bobby then earned his starting slot back for the Championship Cup Semi Final (a 32–0 win over Doncaster Knights) and the Final in which Jersey were defeated 35-31 and retaining the trophy for the third straight time.

Season 2023/24 started with a run of Premiership Cup games the second of which against Bristol at Ashton Gate marked Bobby's 50th appearance for the Green and Whites. In the Championship Bobby was a near ever present as Ealing stormed to their second title in three years. He has one of his best games for the club in a crucial late season 17–26 win away at Cornish Pirates where he scored the crucial try and nearly drowned several times during the game. Ealing also reached the Semi Finals of the Premiership Cup where they lost a close encounter with Leicester Tigers.

Season 2024/25 started slowly for Bobby, an early season injury meant it wasn't until 23 November that he made his first appearance scoring a try in a 36-5 Premiership Cup win over London Scottish. He then followed up with another try against the same opponents on the same field in the Championship a week later. He then had a solid run in the number 4 shirt as Ealing again powered their way to another Championship tile, eventually winning by 13 points. However, on 5 April 2025 Bobby's season was over, a hand injury that had troubled him for several weeks finally won the day and Bobby had season ending surgery.

In March 2025 Bobby signed a new two-year contract with Trailfinders keeping him the until the summer of 2027.

Season 2025/26 was an injury hit season, after returning in November against Hartpury University RFC, he injured his Achilles scoring a try against Caldy RFC on the 6th December 2025 that finished his season after 5 games.

Season 2026/27 started with Bobby back in Trailfinders first team and on 17th October 2026 he completed a century of points in professional rugby with the first of a double against Blackheath RFC

Professional Career
Club	Season	Games	Starts	Tries	Pens	Cons	DGs	Points
Southern Kings	2017/18	20	16	1	0	0	0	5
Southern Kings	2018/19	6	5	0	0	0	0	0
Southern Kings	2019/20	13	5	1	0	0	0	5
Ealing Trailfinders	2020/21	14	14	1	0	0	0	5
Ealing Trailfinders	2021/22	20	17	2	0	0	0	10
Ealing Trailfinders	2022/23	15	10	3	0	0	0	15
Ealing Trailfinders	2023/24	23	21	4	0	0	0	20
Ealing Trailfinders	2024/25	14	12	4	0	0	0	20
Ealing Trailfinders	2025/26	5	5	2	0	0	0	10
Ealing Trailfinders	2026/27	5	4	3	0	0	0	15
TOTALS	-	135	109	21	0	0	0	105
