= Gerdus van der Walt =

South African rugby union player

- Born: 20 April 1995 (age 31) Potchefstroom, South Africa
- Height: 1.83 m (6 ft 0 in)
- Weight: 101 kg (15 st 13 lb; 223 lb)
- School: Hoërskool Monument, Krugersdorp
- Notable relative: Jaco van der Walt (brother)

Rugby union career
- Position: Centre
- Current team: Kamaishi Seawaves
Youth career
- 2013–2016: Golden Lions
Senior career
Years	Team	Apps	(Points)
2015	Golden Lions	1	(0)
2015–2017	Golden Lions XV	9	(10)
2018	Yamaha Júbilo	3	(10)
2020–	Kamaishi Seawaves	48	(90)
- Correct as of 22 February 2021

Gerdus van der Walt (born 20 April 1995) is a South African rugby union player for Kamaishi Seawaves in the Top League Cup in Japan. His regular position is centre.

== Career ==
In 2013, Van der Walt was selected to represent the Golden Lions at the Under-18 Craven Week competition held in Polokwane; he also scored a try for the Golden Lions in their match against SWD. He was also selected to represent the Golden Lions U19s in the Under-19 Provincial Championship just a month later. He made seven appearances in the competition – all of those as a replacement – as the Golden Lions finished second on the log and reached the final of the competition, where they lost to the Blue Bulls U19s.

Van der Walt again appeared for their Under-19s in the 2014 Under-19 Provincial Championship, having firmly established himself as their first-choice inside centre, starting all twelve of their matches in that position. He scored tries in their matches against the Blue Bulls U19s and the Leopards U19s, but could not help the team qualify for the semi-finals as they ended the season in fifth position.

Van der Walt made his first class debut during Round Two of the 2015 Vodacom Cup competition, coming on as a replacement in the second half of their 31–21 victory over Limpopo Blue Bulls in Polokwane. His next appearance saw him elevated to the starting line-up in their final match in the competition, a 36–20 victory over the Griffons as the Golden Lions completed the regular season with sevens wins in seven matches. He also appeared off the bench in their semi-final match against the Pumas, but it ended in disappointment as the team from Nelspruit ran out 43–20 winners. He made eleven starts for the Golden Lions U21s in the 2015 Under-21 Provincial Championship Group A, scoring tries in five of those matches to help them finish fourth on the log.

Van der Walt was included in the Golden Lions' Currie Cup starting line-up for the final match of the 2015 Currie Cup Premier Division regular season. He helped them to a 29–19 victory over Griquas to finish the regular season unbeaten, winning all ten matches.

== Personal life ==
Van der Walt is the younger brother of fly-half Jaco van der Walt. Both brothers came through the ranks at the Golden Lions and they played together on occasion; on 8 May 2015, both were selected in the starting line-up for the Golden Lions' match against the Griffons in Welkom, while they also played next to each other in the final match of the 2015 Currie Cup Premier Division regular season, in a match that saw Gerdus make his debut in the competition.
