= Inny Radebe =

South African rugby union player

Inny-Christian Radebe
- Full name: Inny-Christian Radebe (Note: Radebe's full names were originally listed as Innocent Radebe on the South African Rugby Union's website, but later changed to Inny-Christian Radebe. Websites and articles might refer to him as, Innocent Radebe, Inny-Christian Radebe or simply Inny Radebe.)
- Born: 3 January 1995 (age 31) Johannesburg, South Africa
- Height: 1.77 m (5 ft 9 1/2 in)
- Weight: 87 kg (13 st 10 lb; 192 lb)
- School: St Stithians College
- University: University of KwaZulu-Natal
- Occupation: Professional Rugby Union Player

Rugby union career
- Position: Fly-half / Centre / Fullback
Youth career
- 2008–2013: Golden Lions
- 2013–2016: Sharks
Amateur team(s)
Years	Team	Apps	(Points)
2015	UKZN Impi	4	(44)
Senior career
Years	Team	Apps	(Points)
2015–2017	Sharks XV	8	(64)
2016–2017	Sharks (Currie Cup)	17	(30)
2017	Sharks	2	(0)
2018	Golden Lions XV	2	(0)
2019	Sharks XV	5	(16)
2022	Sharks (Currie Cup)	4	(8)
- Correct as of 23 July 2022

Inny-Christian Radebe (born 3 January 1995) is a South African rugby union player for the Sharks in the Currie Cup and the Sharks XV in the Rugby Challenge. He can play as a fly-half, inside centre or fullback.

== Rugby career ==
=== Schoolboy rugby ===
Radebe was born in Johannesburg and represented the Golden Lions at national youth competitions since primary school level, when he participated at the Under-13 Craven Week in 2008. He also earned selection during high school level, representing the Golden Lions at the 2011 Under-16 Grant Khomo Week and at the Under-18 Craven Week in both 2012 and 2013.

=== Sharks / UKZN ===
Radebe signed a deal to join the Durban-based Sharks academy after finishing high school. He made one appearance for the Sharks U19s in 2013 in a 38–0 victory against Western Province U19 prior to joining them on a full-time basis. In 2014, he started eleven of the team's matches in the 2014 Under-19 Provincial Championship and scored 122 points, second only to Western Province's Ernst Stapelberg in the top scorers list in Group A of the competition. He scored four tries – three in their two matches against former side Golden Lions and a fourth against Eastern Province, to help the side progress to the semi-finals, where they lost 20–43 to the Blue Bulls.

Radebe made four appearances for UKZN Impi during the 2015 Varsity Shield, scoring 44 points on the way, and picked up a "Player That Rocks" award in the finals, where he helped UKZN to silverware by beating Wits 29–24. Less than a week after the final, he was also included in the Sharks XV squad for the 2015 Vodacom Cup competition and made his first class debut in a defeat to a Free State XV. After another match in the Vodacom Cup against the SWD Eagles, he played in a match for a Varsity Cup Dream Team – with Radebe being only player from the second-tier Varsity Shield to be included – against the South Africa Under-20 squad as the latter prepared for the 2015 World Rugby Under 20 Championship, kicking one conversion in a 24–31 defeat. Radebe was initially included in Coach Dawie Theron's squad to contest the Junior World Cup in Italy before withdrawing through injury

Radebe next played for the Sharks U21 side in their 2015 Under-21 Provincial Championship Group A season. He made ten starts during the competition, scoring six tries and 105 points with the boot to finish as the top scorer in the competition with a tally of 135 points. This helped his side reach the semi-finals, where they lost to Free State U21.

Radebe was included in the Sharks Super Rugby squad for their 2016 season, but suffered a meniscus tear after two appearances for the Sharks XV in the 2016 Currie Cup qualification series which ruled him out for a large part of the season. He returned at the start of July to make further appearances in the Currie Cup competition.
