= Hanno Snyman =

South African rugby union player

- Born: 18 April 1995 (age 31) Bellville, South Africa
- Height: 1.81 m (5 ft 11 1/2 in)
- Weight: 106 kg (234 lb; 16 st 10 lb)
- School: Hoër Landbouskool Oakdale
- University: University of the Free State

Rugby union career
- Position: Hooker
- Current team: Union sportive L'Isle-Jourdain
Youth career
- 2013: SWD Eagles
- 2014–2016: Western Province
Amateur team(s)
Years	Team	Apps	(Points)
2015–2016	Jed-Forest RFC	8	(5)
2017–2020	University of the Free State	40	(70)
Senior career
Years	Team	Apps	(Points)
2018	Free State Cheetahs	2	(0)
2021	Leopards	1	(0)
2021–2023	Gernika	24	(55)
2023–2025	Union sportive L'Isle-Jourdain	40	(50)
- Correct as of 10 June 2025

Hanno Snyman (born 18 April 1995) is a South African rugby union who plays as a hooker. He previously represented the Cheetahs in the Currie Cup and played for Jed-Forest RFC in Scotland during the 2015–16 season. Since 2023, he has been playing for Union sportive L'Isle-Jourdain in France.

== Personal life ==
Snyman is married to Zané Snyman (née Kriel), a South African.
