= Khanyo Ngcukana =

South African rugby union player

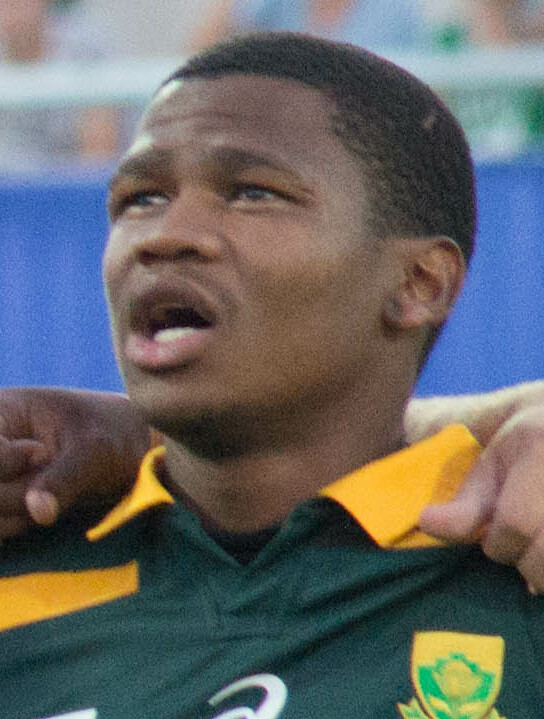
- Ngcukana in 2015
- Full name: Khanyo Templeton Niccolo Ngcukana
- Born: 10 May 1995 (age 31) The Hague, Netherlands
- Height: 1.81 m (5 ft 11 1/2 in)
- Weight: 87 kg (13 st 10 lb; 192 lb)
- School: Rondebosch Boys' High School, Cape Town
- University: University of Cape Town

Rugby union career
- Position: Winger / Fullback
- Current team: Western Province
Youth career
- 2011–2016: Western Province
Amateur team(s)
Years	Team	Apps	(Points)
2015–2017	UCT Ikey Tigers	10	(20)
Senior career
Years	Team	Apps	(Points)
2016–present	Western Province	18	(35)
- Correct as of 18 April 2018
International career
Years	Team	Apps	(Points)
2015	South Africa Under-20	3	(5)
- Correct as of 18 April 2018

Khanyo Templeton Ngcukana (born 10 May 1995) is a Dutch-born South African rugby union player, currently playing with Western Province in the Currie Cup. He can play as a winger or a fullback.

== Rugby union career ==
=== 2011–2013 : Schoolboy rugby union ===
Ngcukana was born in The Hague in the Netherlands to South African parents, but grew up in Cape Town. He attended Rondebosch Boys' High School, representing them in the Under-16 Grant Khomo Week in 2011 and the premier high school rugby union tournament in South Africa, the Under-18 Craven Week, in 2013.

=== 2014–2015 : Youth and Varsity Cup rugby and South Africa Under-20s ===
After high school, Ngcukana joined the Western Province academy and he was a member of their Under-19 squad that participated in the 2014 Under-19 Provincial Championship. He made four appearances during the regular season to help Western Province qualify for the semi-finals after finishing in third spot on the log. He started their 29–22 victory over Free State U19 in the semi-final, as well as the final against the Blue Bulls a week later. He scored Western Province's first try of the match in the 18th minute of the final, as his side won 33–26 to be crowned champions.

At the start of 2015, Ngcukana played in the Varsity Cup for the UCT Ikey Tigers. He started all eight of their matches in a season that saw them reach the semi-final stage before losing to eventual champions UFS Shimlas. He scored three tries during the competition; two in a 90–8 victory over CUT Ixias and another in their 40–21 victory over NWU Pukke.

He was named in a 37-man training squad for the South Africa national under-20 rugby union team and started for them in a friendly match against a Varsity Cup Dream Team in April 2015. He was then included in the squad that embarked on a two-match tour of Argentina. He was not named in the matchday squad for their 25–22 victory over Argentina in their first match but played the full 80 minutes of a 39–28 victory in the second match four days later. Upon the team's return to South Africa, he was named in the final squad for the 2015 World Rugby Under 20 Championship in Italy. He started their 33–5 win against the hosts in their first match, but didn't feature in their 40–8 victory over Samoa in their second match. He returned to the starting lineup for final pool match against Australia, scoring one of South Africa's six tries in a 46–13 victory, and also started in their 20–28 loss to England in the semi-final. He was omitted from the squad for the third-place play-off match against France, where South Africa achieved a 31–18 win to secure third place in the competition.

He returned to domestic action for the Western Province U21 team during the 2015 Under-21 Provincial Championship. He appeared in every match that his team played during the season, scoring six tries – two against the Free State in Bloemfontein, one each in matches against the Leopards and Sharks and another two in a 44–38 victory over the Golden Lions in their penultimate match in the regular season. Western Province finished top of the log with ten victories in their twelve matches to qualify for the title play-offs, and Ngcukana started both their 43–20 win over the Golden Lions in the semi-finals and in their 52–17 win over Free State in the final to win a youth provincial title for the second season in a row.

=== 2016–present : Western Province / UCT ===
At the start of 2016 – after two appearances for the UCT Ikey Tigers in the Varsity Cup, scoring a try against defending champions UFS Shimlas – Ngcukana was included in Western Province's squad for the 2016 Currie Cup qualification series and made his domestic first class debut in their Round Three match against a Free State XV He was retained in the starting line-up for their next match against a Golden Lions XV a week later and scored a try – his first in senior rugby – which proved to be crucial in his side's 27–24 victory. Ngcukana eventually made ten starts for Western Province on the right wing during the competition, contributing five more tries – against a Sharks XV, Griquas, the Leopards, the Falcons and Namibian side the Welwitschias – to finish the competition as Western Province joint-highest try-scorer and helping Western Province finish the competition on top of the log, by winning thirteen of their fourteen matches.

He was then included in Western Province's squad for the 2016 Currie Cup Premier Division and named in the starting line-up for their opening match of the season against the Blue Bulls in Pretoria, playing the full 80 minutes of a 26–45 defeat.
