= List of 2019–20 Super Rugby transfers (South Africa) =

This is a list of player movements for Super Rugby teams prior to the end of the 2020 Super Rugby season. Departure and arrivals of all players that were included in a Super Rugby squad for 2019 or 2020 are listed here, regardless of when it occurred. Future-dated transfers are only included if confirmed by the player or his agent, his former team or his new team.

Notes

- 2019 players listed are all players that were named in the initial senior squad, or subsequently included in a 23-man match day squad at any game during the season.
- (did not play) denotes that a player did not play at all during one of the two seasons due to injury or non-selection. These players are included to indicate they were contracted to the team. For the 2020 season, Super Rugby was suspended after 7 rounds of matches due to the COVID-19 pandemic, with regional tournaments taking place there after. Players listed as 'did not play' did not feature in any of the 7 rounds of matches played that season.
- (short-term) denotes that a player wasn't initially contracted, but came in during the season. This could either be a club rugby player coming in as injury cover, or a player whose contract had expired at another team (typically in the northern hemisphere).
- Flags are only shown for players moving to or from another country.
- Players may play in several positions, but are listed in only one.

== Bulls ==
Bulls transfers 2019–2020
Pos	2019 squad	Out	In	2020 players
PR	Matthys Basson (did not play); Lizo Gqoboka; Wiehahn Herbst; Madot Mabokela (did not play); Simphiwe Matanzima; Nqoba Mxoli (did not play); Trevor Nyakane; Dayan van der Westhuizen; Conraad van Vuuren	(substituted off) Matthys Basson (to Blue Bulls); (substituted off) Madot Mabokela (to Blue Bulls); (substituted off) Nqoba Mxoli (to Griquas); (substituted off) Conraad van Vuuren (to (Japan) Sunwolves)	(substituted in) Gerhard Steenekamp (from Tuks)	Lizo Gqoboka; Wiehahn Herbst; Simphiwe Matanzima; Trevor Nyakane; Gerhard Steenekamp; Dayan van der Westhuizen (did not play)
HK	Schalk Brits; Corniel Els (short-term); Johan Grobbelaar; Edgar Marutlulle (did not play); Jaco Visagie	(substituted off) Schalk Brits (retired); (substituted off) Edgar Marutlulle (injured)	(substituted in) Louis van der Westhuizen (from (Namibia) Welwitschias)	Corniel Els; Johan Grobbelaar; Louis van der Westhuizen (did not play); Jaco Visagie
LK	Lood de Jager; Jason Jenkins; Eli Snyman (short-term); RG Snyman; Hendré Stassen (did not play)	(substituted off) Lood de Jager (to (England) Sale Sharks); (substituted off) Jason Jenkins (to (Japan) Toyota Verblitz); (substituted off) Eli Snyman (to (Italy) Benetton); (substituted off) RG Snyman (to (Japan) Honda Heat); (substituted off) Hendré Stassen (to (France) Stade Français)	(substituted in) Andries Ferreira (from (New Zealand) Hurricanes); (substituted in) Ian Groenewald (from Griquas); (substituted in) Juandré Kruger (from (France) Toulon); (substituted in) Ruan Nortjé (from Blue Bulls); (substituted in) Ryno Pieterse (from Blue Bulls U21)	Andries Ferreira; Ian Groenewald; Juandré Kruger; Ruan Nortjé; Ryno Pieterse
FL	Tim Agaba; Thembelani Bholi; Nick de Jager (did not play); Carel du Preez (did not play); Jannes Kirsten; Paul Schoeman; Roelof Smit; Ruan Steenkamp; Muller Uys (did not play); Marco van Staden	(substituted off) Thembelani Bholi (to Southern Kings); (substituted off) Nick de Jager (to Blue Bulls XV); (substituted off) Carel du Preez (to Pumas); (substituted off) Jannes Kirsten (to (England) Exeter Chiefs); (substituted off) Paul Schoeman (to (Japan) Honda Heat); (substituted off) Roelof Smit (to Lions)	(substituted in) Abongile Nonkontwana (from Cheetahs); (substituted in) Josh Strauss (from (England) Sale Sharks); (substituted in) Wian Vosloo (from Sharks)	Tim Agaba (did not play); Abongile Nonkontwana; Ruan Steenkamp; Josh Strauss; Muller Uys; Marco van Staden; Wian Vosloo
N8	Hanro Liebenberg; Jano Venter (did not play); Duane Vermeulen	(substituted off) Hanro Liebenberg (to (England) Leicester Tigers); (substituted off) Jano Venter (to (Japan) Shimizu Blue Sharks); (substituted off) Duane Vermeulen (to (Japan) Kubota Spears)	(substituted in) Jeandré Rudolph (from Pumas)	Jeandré Rudolph
SH	Theo Maree (did not play); Embrose Papier; Ivan van Zyl; André Warner	(substituted off) Theo Maree (to Southern Kings); (substituted off) André Warner (to Lions)	(substituted in) Marco Jansen van Vuren (from Blue Bulls)	Marco Jansen van Vuren; Embrose Papier; Ivan van Zyl
FH	Marnitz Boshoff (did not play); Manie Libbok; Handré Pollard; Chris Smith (short-term, did not play)	(substituted off) Marnitz Boshoff (to Blue Bulls); (substituted off) Handré Pollard (to (France) Montpellier)	(substituted in) Morné Steyn (from (France) Stade Français)	Manie Libbok; Chris Smith (did not play); Morné Steyn
CE	Stedman Gans (did not play); JT Jackson; Jesse Kriel; Burger Odendaal; Dylan Sage	(substituted off) Stedman Gans (to South Africa Sevens); (substituted off) JT Jackson (to Southern Kings); (substituted off) Jesse Kriel (to (Japan) Canon Eagles)	(substituted in) Franco Naudé (returned from Lions); (substituted in) Marnus Potgieter (from Blue Bulls XV); (substituted in) Nafi Tuitavake (from (England) Northampton Saints)	Franco Naudé (did not play); Burger Odendaal; Marnus Potgieter (did not play); Dylan Sage (did not play); Nafi Tuitavake
WG	Cornal Hendricks; Travis Ismaiel (did not play); Johnny Kôtze; Duncan Matthews (did not play); Rosko Specman; Jade Stighling	(substituted off) Travis Ismaiel (to (England) Harlequins); (substituted off) Duncan Matthews (to Lions)		Cornal Hendricks; Johnny Kôtze; Rosko Specman; Jade Stighling (did not play)
FB	Warrick Gelant; Divan Rossouw		(substituted in) Richard Kriel (from Blue Bulls U21)	Warrick Gelant; Richard Kriel (did not play); Divan Rossouw
Coach	Pote Human			Pote Human

== Lions ==
Lions transfers 2019–2020
Pos	2019 squad	Out	In	2020 players
PR	Jacobie Adriaanse; Chergin Fillies (did not play); Johannes Jonker; Nathan McBeth; Danie Mienie (did not play); Carlü Sadie; Sti Sithole; Dylan Smith; Frans van Wyk	(substituted off) Jacobie Adriaanse (retired); (substituted off) Chergin Fillies (to Golden Lions); (substituted off) Danie Mienie (to (Italy) Rovigo)	(substituted in) Jannie du Plessis (from (France) Montpellier); (substituted in) Asenathi Ntlabakanye (from Golden Lions U21)	Jannie du Plessis; Johannes Jonker (did not play); Nathan McBeth (did not play); Asenathi Ntlabakanye (did not play); Carlü Sadie; Sti Sithole; Dylan Smith; Frans van Wyk
HK	Jan-Henning Campher; Robbie Coetzee; Pieter Jansen; Malcolm Marx	(substituted off) Robbie Coetzee (released); (substituted off) Malcolm Marx (to (Japan) NTT Communications Shining Arcs)	(substituted in) Marko Janse van Rensburg (from Pumas)	Jan-Henning Campher; Marko Janse van Rensburg (did not play); Pieter Jansen
LK	Lourens Erasmus (did not play); Rhyno Herbst; Robert Kruger; Stephan Lewies; Reinhard Nothnagel; Marvin Orie; PJ Steenkamp (did not play); Wilhelm van der Sluys; Ruan Vermaak	(substituted off) Lourens Erasmus (to (Japan) NTT DoCoMo Red Hurricanes); (substituted off) Robert Kruger (to (Japan) NTT Communications Shining Arcs); (substituted off) Stephan Lewies (to (England) Harlequins); (substituted off) PJ Steenkamp (to Golden Lions)	(substituted in) Ruben Schoeman (from Golden Lions)	Rhyno Herbst (did not play); Reinhard Nothnagel (did not play); Marvin Orie; Ruben Schoeman; Wilhelm van der Sluys; Ruan Vermaak
FL	Cyle Brink; Hacjivah Dayimani; Marnus Schoeman; Kwagga Smith; Vincent Tshituka; James Venter	(substituted off) Kwagga Smith (to (Japan) Yamaha Júbilo); (substituted off) James Venter (to Sharks)	(substituted in) Willem Alberts (from (France) Stade Français); (substituted in) Jaco Kriel (from (England) Gloucester); (substituted in) Roelof Smit (from Bulls)	Willem Alberts; Cyle Brink (did not play); Hacjivah Dayimani; Jaco Kriel (did not play); Marnus Schoeman; Roelof Smit (did not play); Vincent Tshituka
N8	Jo-Hanko de Villiers (did not play); Len Massyn (did not play); Warren Whiteley	(substituted off) Jo-Hanko de Villiers (to Golden Lions); (substituted off) Warren Whiteley (retired)		Len Massyn
SH	Ross Cronjé; Nic Groom; Dillon Smit; Bradley Thain (did not play); Morné van den Berg (did not play)	(substituted off) Nic Groom (to (Scotland) Edinburgh); (substituted off) Bradley Thain (to (Uruguay) Peñarol)	(substituted in) André Warner (from Bulls)	Ross Cronjé (did not play); Dillon Smit; Morné van den Berg (short-term); André Warner
FH	Eddie Fouché (did not play); Elton Jantjies; Shaun Reynolds	(substituted off) Eddie Fouché (to Golden Lions)	(substituted in) James Mollentze (from Free State U21); (substituted in) Tiaan Swanepoel (from (Australia) West Harbour)	Elton Jantjies; James Mollentze (did not play); Shaun Reynolds; Tiaan Swanepoel
CE	Jan-Louis la Grange (did not play); Lionel Mapoe; Franco Naudé (short-term); Mannie Rass (did not play); Wandisile Simelane; Wayne van der Bank (did not play); Louritz van der Schyff (did not play); Harold Vorster	(substituted off) Jan-Louis la Grange (to Golden Lions); (substituted off) Lionel Mapoe (to (France) Stade Français); (substituted off) Franco Naudé (returned to Bulls); (substituted off) Wayne van der Bank (to Golden Lions); (substituted off) Harold Vorster (to (Japan) Panasonic Wild Knights)	(substituted in) Dan Kriel (from Stormers); (substituted in) Duncan Matthews (from Bulls)	Dan Kriel; Duncan Matthews; Mannie Rass; Wandisile Simelane; Louritz van der Schyff (did not play)
WG	Ruan Combrinck; Aphiwe Dyantyi; Tyrone Green; Courtnall Skosan; Madosh Tambwe (did not play)	(substituted off) Ruan Combrinck (to (France) Stade Français); (substituted off) Aphiwe Dyantyi (suspended); (substituted off) Madosh Tambwe (to Sharks)	(substituted in) Stean Pienaar (from Golden Lions); (substituted in) Jamba Ulengo (from Blue Bulls)	Tyrone Green; Stean Pienaar (did not play); Courtnall Skosan; Jamba Ulengo
FB	Andries Coetzee; Gianni Lombard; Sylvian Mahuza	(substituted off) Sylvian Mahuza (to (Japan) NTT Communications Shining Arcs)		Andries Coetzee; Gianni Lombard (did not play)
Coach	Swys de Bruin; Ivan van Rooyen (short-term)	(substituted off) Swys de Bruin (to Southern Kings (coaching consultant))		Ivan van Rooyen

== Sharks ==
Sharks transfers 2019–2020
Pos	2019 squad	Out	In	2020 players
PR	Thomas du Toit; Mzamo Majola; Khutha Mchunu; John-Hubert Meyer; Tendai Mtawarira; Coenie Oosthuizen; Juan Schoeman	(substituted off) Tendai Mtawarira (to (United States) Old Glory DC); (substituted off) Coenie Oosthuizen (to (England) Sale Sharks)	(substituted in) Michael Kumbirai (from Stormers); (substituted in) Ox Nché (from Cheetahs)	Thomas du Toit; Michael Kumbirai (did not play); Mzamo Majola; Khutha Mchunu (did not play); John-Hubert Meyer; Ox Nché; Juan Schoeman
HK	Craig Burden (short-term); Cullen Collopy (short-term); Fez Mbatha; Chiliboy Ralepelle (did not play); Dylan Richardson; Akker van der Merwe; Kerron van Vuuren	(substituted off) Cullen Collopy (to (United States) New Orleans Gold); (substituted off) Chiliboy Ralepelle (suspended); (substituted off) Akker van der Merwe (to (England) Sale Sharks)		Craig Burden; Fez Mbatha (did not play); Dylan Richardson; Kerron van Vuuren
LK	Hyron Andrews; Ruan Botha; Andrew Evans (did not play); Gideon Koegelenberg; Tyler Paul; JJ van der Mescht; Ruben van Heerden	(substituted off) Ruan Botha (to (England) London Irish); (substituted off) Andrew Evans (injured); (substituted off) Gideon Koegelenberg (to (Australia) Rebels)	(substituted in) Le Roux Roets (from (Australia) Waratahs); (substituted in) Jordan Sesink-Clee (from Maties); (substituted in) Emile van Heerden (from Sharks U21)	Hyron Andrews; Tyler Paul; Le Roux Roets; Jordan Sesink-Clee (did not play); JJ van der Mescht (did not play); Emile van Heerden (did not play); Ruben van Heerden
FL	Phepsi Buthelezi; Kwanda Dimaza (did not play); Jean-Luc du Preez; Tera Mtembu (did not play); Luke Stringer; Jacques Vermeulen; Wian Vosloo	(substituted off) Kwanda Dimaza (to Sharks); (substituted off) Jean-Luc du Preez (to (England) Sale Sharks); (substituted off) Luke Stringer (to Sharks); (substituted off) Jacques Vermeulen (to (England) Exeter Chiefs); (substituted off) Wian Vosloo (to Bulls)	(substituted in) Celimpilo Gumede (from Sharks U21); (substituted in) Sikhumbuzo Notshe (from Stormers); (substituted in) Andisa Ntsila (from Sharks); (substituted in) Evan Roos (from Sharks); (substituted in) James Venter (from Lions)	Phepsi Buthelezi; Celimpilo Gumede (did not play); Tera Mtembu (did not play); Sikhumbuzo Notshe; Andisa Ntsila (did not play); Evan Roos (did not play); James Venter
N8	Dan du Preez; Philip van der Walt	(substituted off) Dan du Preez (to (England) Sale Sharks); (substituted off) Philip van der Walt (to (England) Newcastle Falcons)	(substituted in) Henco Venter (from Cheetahs)	Henco Venter
SH	Zee Mkhabela (short-term); Sanele Nohamba (did not play); Louis Schreuder; Grant Williams; Cameron Wright	(substituted off) Zee Mkhabela (returned to Sharks XV)	(substituted in) Jaden Hendrikse (from Sharks U21)	Jaden Hendrikse (did not play); Sanele Nohamba; Louis Schreuder; Grant Williams (did not play); Cameron Wright (did not play)
FH	Curwin Bosch; Robert du Preez	(substituted off) Robert du Preez (to (England) Sale Sharks)	(substituted in) Jordan Chait (from Maties); (substituted in) Boeta Chamberlain (from Sharks)	Curwin Bosch; Jordan Chait (did not play); Boeta Chamberlain
CE	Lukhanyo Am; André Esterhuizen; Marius Louw; Jeremy Ward		(substituted in) Murray Koster (from Sharks)	Lukhanyo Am; André Esterhuizen; Murray Koster (did not play); Marius Louw; Jeremy Ward
WG	Muller du Plessis (did not play); Makazole Mapimpi; Lwazi Mvovo; Sbu Nkosi; Kobus van Wyk; Leolin Zas (did not play)	(substituted off) Muller du Plessis (to Sharks); (substituted off) Kobus van Wyk (to (New Zealand) Hurricanes); (substituted off) Leolin Zas (to Stormers)	(substituted in) JP Pietersen (from Sharks); (substituted in) Madosh Tambwe (from Lions)	Makazole Mapimpi; Lwazi Mvovo; Sbu Nkosi; JP Pietersen (did not play); Madosh Tambwe
FB	Aphelele Fassi; Rhyno Smith; Courtney Winnaar (did not play)	(substituted off) Rhyno Smith (to Cheetahs); (substituted off) Courtney Winnaar (to Southern Kings)	(substituted in) Thaakir Abrahams (from Sharks U21)	Thaakir Abrahams (did not play); Aphelele Fassi
Coach	Robert du Preez	(substituted off) Robert du Preez (released)	(substituted in) Sean Everitt (from Sharks)	Sean Everitt

== Stormers ==
Stormers transfers 2019–2020
Pos	2019 squad	Out	In	2020 players
PR	Kwenzo Blose (did not play); Neethling Fouché; Corné Fourie; Steven Kitshoff; Michael Kumbirai; Wilco Louw; Frans Malherbe; Lee-Marvin Mazibuko (did not play); Ali Vermaak	(substituted off) Corné Fourie (to (England) Gloucester); (substituted off) Michael Kumbirai (to Sharks); (substituted off) Lee-Marvin Mazibuko (to (Italy) Viadana)	(substituted in) Leon Lyons (from Western Province); (substituted in) Sazi Sandi (from Western Province)	Kwenzo Blose; Neethling Fouché (did not play); Steven Kitshoff; Wilco Louw; Leon Lyons (did not play); Frans Malherbe; Sazi Sandi (did not play); Ali Vermaak
HK	Dan Jooste (short-term); Bongi Mbonambi; Scarra Ntubeni; Ramone Samuels (did not play); Chad Solomon	(substituted off) Ramone Samuels (injured)	(substituted in) Schalk Erasmus (from Western Province)	Schalk Erasmus (did not play); Dan Jooste (did not play); Bongi Mbonambi; Scarra Ntubeni; Chad Solomon
LK	Pieter-Steph du Toit; Eben Etzebeth; David Meihuizen (short-term); Salmaan Moerat; JD Schickerling; Ernst van Rhyn; Chris van Zyl	(substituted off) Eben Etzebeth (to (France) Toulon)		Pieter-Steph du Toit; David Meihuizen; Salmaan Moerat; JD Schickerling; Ernst van Rhyn; Chris van Zyl
FL	Johan du Toit; Siya Kolisi; Chris Massyn; Sikhumbuzo Notshe; Marno Redelinghuys (short-term); Cobus Wiese; Nama Xaba (did not play)	(substituted off) Chris Massyn (to Cheetahs); (substituted off) Sikhumbuzo Notshe (to Sharks); (substituted off) Marno Redelinghuys (to (United States) Rugby ATL)	(substituted in) Ben-Jason Dixon (from Western Province)	Ben-Jason Dixon (did not play); Johan du Toit; Siya Kolisi; Cobus Wiese; Nama Xaba (did not play)
N8	Juarno Augustus; Jaco Coetzee; Kobus van Dyk	(substituted off) Kobus van Dyk (to (Japan) Canon Eagles)		Juarno Augustus; Jaco Coetzee
SH	Paul de Wet (did not play); Herschel Jantjies; Justin Phillips; Jano Vermaak	(substituted off) Justin Phillips (to Western Province); (substituted off) Jano Vermaak (to Western Province)	(substituted in) Godlen Masimla (from Western Province)	Paul de Wet; Herschel Jantjies; Godlen Masimla
FH	Jean-Luc du Plessis; Joshua Stander; Damian Willemse	(substituted off) Joshua Stander (to (Japan) Suntory Sungoliath)	(substituted in) Abner van Reenen (from Western Province)	Jean-Luc du Plessis; Abner van Reenen (did not play); Damian Willemse
CE	Damian de Allende; Dan du Plessis; JJ Engelbrecht; Dan Kriel; Ruhan Nel	(substituted off) Damian de Allende (to (Japan) Panasonic Wild Knights); (substituted off) JJ Engelbrecht (to (Japan) Sunwolves); (substituted off) Dan Kriel (to Lions)	(substituted in) Michal Haznar (from Griquas); (substituted in) Lyle Hendricks (from Western Province); (substituted in) Matt More (from (Ireland) Munster Academy); (substituted in) Rikus Pretorius (from Western Province); (substituted in) Jamie Roberts (from (England) Bath)	Dan du Plessis (did not play); Michal Haznar (did not play); Lyle Hendricks (did not play); Matt More (did not play); Ruhan Nel; Rikus Pretorius; Jamie Roberts
WG	Sergeal Petersen; Duncan Saal (did not play); Seabelo Senatla; Edwill van der Merwe	(substituted off) Duncan Saal (to Cheetahs)	(substituted in) Leolin Zas (from Sharks)	Sergeal Petersen; Seabelo Senatla; Edwill van der Merwe (did not play); Leolin Zas (did not play)
FB	Craig Barry; Dillyn Leyds; SP Marais; EW Viljoen	(substituted off) Craig Barry (to Cheetahs); (substituted off) SP Marais (to (Japan) Canon Eagles); (substituted off) EW Viljoen (to (England) Leicester Tigers)	(substituted in) David Kriel (from Western Province U21)	David Kriel (did not play); Dillyn Leyds
Coach	Robbie Fleck	(substituted off) Robbie Fleck (released)	(substituted in) John Dobson (from Western Province)	John Dobson

== See also ==
- List of 2019–20 Premiership Rugby transfers
- List of 2019–20 Pro14 transfers
- List of 2019–20 Top 14 transfers
- List of 2019–20 RFU Championship transfers
- List of 2019–20 Major League Rugby transfers
- SANZAAR
- Super Rugby franchise areas
