= 2018 Bulls (rugby union) season =

Season of South African rugby union team

Bulls
- 2018 season
- Head coach: John Mitchell
- Captains: Nick de Jager and Burger Odendaal
- Stadium: Loftus Versfeld, Pretoria
- Overall: 12th
- South African Conference: 5th
- Record: Won 6, Lost 10
- Top try scorer: All: Jesse Kriel (8)
- Top points scorer: All: Handré Pollard (144)

In 2018, the Bulls participated in the 2018 Super Rugby competition, the 23rd edition of the competition since its inception in 1996. They were included in the South African Conference of the competition, along with the Jaguares, Lions, Sharks and Stormers.

The Bulls won six and lost ten of their matches during the regular season of the competition to finish bottom of the South African Conference, and in 12th place overall.

== Personnel ==
=== Coaches and management ===
The Bulls coaching and management staff for the 2018 Super Rugby season were:

2018 Bulls coaches and management
Name	Title
John Mitchell	Head coach and defense coach
Hayden Groepes	Assistant coach (skills, attack and kicking)
Pote Human	Assistant coach (forward coach and lineouts)
Gary Botha	Assistant coach (forward coach and scrums)
Elias Bennett	Baggage and kit master
Dr Herman Rossouw	Team doctor
Lance Lemmetjies	Team physio
Pieter du Plessis	Team physio
Juandre Williams	Senior rehab specialist
Jacus Coetzee	Strength and conditioning coach
Ghafoer Luckan	Strength and conditioning coach
John William Meyer	Technical analyst

=== Squad ===
The following players were named in the Bulls squad for the 2018 Super Rugby season:

2018 Bulls squad
Player	Position/s	Date of birth (age)	Super Rugby		Bulls	
Player	Position/s	Date of birth (age)	Apps	Pts	Apps	Pts
(South Africa) Shaun Adendorff	Flank	28 May 1992 (aged 25)	3	0	3	0
(South Africa) Tim Agaba	Number eight	23 July 1989 (aged 28)	0	0	0	0
(South Africa) Matthys Basson	Prop	9 June 1995 (aged 22)	0	0	0	0
(South Africa) Thembelani Bholi	Loose forward	18 January 1990 (aged 28)	16	5	0	0
(South Africa) Marnitz Boshoff	Fly-half	11 January 1989 (aged 29)	29	235	0	0
(South Africa) Francois Brummer	Fly-half	17 May 1989 (aged 28)	26	138	22	121
(South Africa) Lood de Jager	Lock	17 December 1992 (aged 25)	50	10	10	5
(South Africa) Nick de Jager	Loose forward	7 February 1990 (aged 28)	18	15	18	15
(South Africa) Aston Fortuin	Lock	16 April 1996 (aged 21)	0	0	0	0
(South Africa) Warrick Gelant	Fullback / Centre	20 May 1995 (aged 22)	19	25	19	25
(South Africa) Lizo Gqoboka	Prop	24 March 1990 (aged 27)	26	5	26	5
(South Africa) Johan Grobbelaar	Hooker	30 December 1997 (aged 20)	0	0	0	0
(South Africa) Boeta Hamman	Fly-half	31 August 1997 (aged 20)	0	0	0	0
(South Africa) Travis Ismaiel	Wing	2 June 1992 (aged 25)	28	40	28	40
(South Africa) JT Jackson	Centre	10 July 1996 (aged 21)	0	0	0	0
(South Africa) Jason Jenkins	Lock / Flank	2 December 1995 (aged 22)	28	25	28	25
(South Africa) Jannes Kirsten	Flank / Lock	1 December 1993 (aged 24)	28	10	28	10
(South Africa) Johnny Kôtze	Centre / Wing	24 January 1993 (aged 25)	19	5	0	0
(South Africa) Jesse Kriel	Centre	15 February 1994 (aged 24)	45	35	45	35
(South Africa) Manie Libbok	Fly-half	15 July 1997 (aged 20)	0	0	0	0
(South Africa) Hanro Liebenberg	Loose forward	10 October 1995 (aged 22)	18	15	18	15
(South Africa) Edgar Marutlulle	Hooker	20 December 1987 (aged 30)	31	20	6	0
(South Africa) Simphiwe Matanzima	Prop	18 August 1997 (aged 20)	0	0	0	0
(South Africa) Duncan Matthews	Wing	24 February 1994 (aged 23)	4	15	4	15
(South Africa) Nqoba Mxoli	Prop	28 May 1992 (aged 25)	2	0	2	0
(South Africa) Ruan Nortjé	Lock	25 July 1998 (aged 19)	0	0	0	0
(South Africa) Trevor Nyakane	Prop	4 May 1989 (aged 28)	81	15	39	0
(South Africa) Burger Odendaal	Centre	15 April 1993 (aged 24)	33	15	33	15
(South Africa) Embrose Papier	Scrum-half	25 April 1997 (aged 20)	0	0	0	0
(South Africa) Handré Pollard	Fly-half / Centre	11 March 1994 (aged 23)	31	293	31	293
(Namibia) Divan Rossouw	Outside back	12 March 1996 (aged 21)	0	0	0	0
(South Africa) Pierre Schoeman	Prop	7 May 1994 (aged 23)	24	10	24	10
(South Africa) Roelof Smit	Flank	11 January 1993 (aged 25)	13	5	13	5
(South Africa) Mornay Smith	Prop	30 January 1998 (aged 20)	0	0	0	0
(South Africa) RG Snyman	Lock	29 January 1995 (aged 23)	25	10	25	10
(South Africa) Hendré Stassen	Lock	29 December 1997 (aged 20)	0	0	0	0
(South Africa) Ruan Steenkamp	Loose forward	2 February 1993 (aged 25)	11	0	11	0
(South Africa) Jade Stighling	Outside back	27 May 1993 (aged 24)	2	0	2	0
(South Africa) Adriaan Strauss	Hooker	18 November 1985 (aged 32)	143	70	46	30
(South Africa) Dries Swanepoel	Centre	19 February 1993 (aged 24)	9	10	9	10
(South Africa) Jamba Ulengo	Wing	7 January 1990 (aged 28)	20	35	20	35
(South Africa) Ruben van Heerden	Lock	27 October 1997 (aged 20)	2	0	2	0
(South Africa) Marco van Staden	Loose forward	25 August 1995 (aged 22)	0	0	0	0
(South Africa) Conraad van Vuuren	Prop	4 September 1995 (aged 22)	6	0	6	0
(South Africa) Frans van Wyk	Prop	25 April 1995 (aged 22)	2	0	0	0
(South Africa) Ivan van Zyl	Scrum-half	30 June 1995 (aged 22)	6	0	6	0
(South Africa) Jaco Visagie	Hooker	8 July 1992 (aged 25)	20	5	20	5
(South Africa) André Warner	Scrum-half	2 September 1993 (aged 24)	2	0	2	0
Note: Players' ages and statistics are correct as of 17 February 2018, the date of the opening round of the competition.

== Standings ==
2018 Super Rugby standings
Pos	Team	Pld	W	D	L	PF	PA	PD	TF	TA	TB	LB	Pts	Qualification
1	Crusaders (C)	16	14	0	2	542	295	+247	77	39	7	0	63	Quarter-finals (Conference leaders)
2	Lions	16	9	0	7	519	435	+84	77	55	6	4	46	Quarter-finals (Conference leaders)
3	Waratahs	16	9	1	6	557	445	+112	74	59	4	2	44	Quarter-finals (Conference leaders)
4	Hurricanes	16	11	0	5	474	343	+131	66	43	5	2	51	Quarter-finals (Wildcard)
5	Chiefs	16	11	0	5	463	368	+95	60	48	3	2	49	Quarter-finals (Wildcard)
6	Highlanders	16	10	0	6	437	445	−8	59	57	3	1	44	Quarter-finals (Wildcard)
7	Jaguares	16	9	0	7	409	418	−9	51	55	2	0	38	Quarter-finals (Wildcard)
8	Sharks	16	7	1	8	437	442	−5	49	57	2	4	36	Quarter-finals (Wildcard)
9	Rebels	16	7	0	9	440	461	−21	57	60	5	3	36	
10	Brumbies	16	7	0	9	393	422	−29	56	52	2	4	34	
11	Stormers	16	6	0	10	390	423	−33	46	56	0	5	29	
12	Bulls	16	6	0	10	441	502	−61	59	66	2	3	29	
13	Reds	16	6	0	10	389	501	−112	49	66	1	3	28	
14	Blues	16	4	0	12	378	509	−131	50	66	2	4	22	
15	Sunwolves	16	3	0	13	404	664	−260	48	99	0	2	14	

Source: Super Rugby

=== Round-by-round ===
The table below shows the Bulls' progression throughout the season. For each round, their cumulative points total is shown with the overall log position:

Team	R1	R2	R3	R4	R5	R6	R7	R8	R9	R10	R11	R12	R13	R14	R15	R16	R17	R18	R19	QF	SF	Final
Opposition	Bye	HUR	LIO	RED	CHI	CRU	STO	Bye	SHA	REB	HIG	STO	SHA	JAG	BRU	Bye	SUN	JAG	LIO	—	—	—
Cumulative Points	0	4	4	5	5	5	9	9	14	19	20	20	24	24	24	24	25	29	29	—	—	—
Position (overall)	6th	8th	9th	10th	13th	14th	12th	12th	8th	8th	9th	11th	9th	10th	11th	12th	11th	12th	12th	—	—	—
Position (SA Conf.)	4th	3rd	3rd	3rd	4th	5th	4th	4th	2nd	2nd	3rd	5th	3rd	4th	5th	5th	4th	5th	5th	—	—	—
Key:	win	draw	loss	bye																		

== Matches ==
The Bulls played the following matches during the 2018 Super Rugby season:

24 February 2018	Bulls	21–19	Hurricanes	Loftus Versfeld, Pretoria
17:15	Try: Johnny Kôtze 4'; Lood de Jager 33'; Pierre Schoeman 72'; Pen: Handré Pollard 7', 40'; Cards: Pierre Schoeman (yellow card) 25' to 35'	Report; Scoreboard	Try: Ricky Riccitelli 12'; Wes Goosen 18'; Beauden Barrett 59'; Con: Ihaia West 19', 60'	Referee: Rasta Rasivhenge

3 March 2018	Bulls	35–49	Lions	Loftus Versfeld, Pretoria
17:15	Try: Johnny Kôtze 35'; Handré Pollard 41'; Lizo Gqoboka 76'; Travis Ismaiel 78'; Con: Marnitz Boshoff 42'; Francois Brummer 77', 79'; Pen: Marnitz Boshoff 6', 23', 28'; Cards: Conraad van Vuuren (yellow card) 54' to 64'; Nick de Jager (yellow card) 55' to 65'	Report; Scoreboard	Try: Ruan Dreyer 14'; Jacques van Rooyen 18'; Marvin Orie 32'; Malcolm Marx 51' penalty try 55'; Sylvian Mahuza 56'; Ross Cronjé 71'; Con: Elton Jantjies 15', 19', 33', 52', 57', 72'	Referee: Marius van der Westhuizen

10 March 2018	Reds	20–14	Bulls	Suncorp Stadium, Brisbane
18:45	Try: Caleb Timu 36'; Aidan Toua 46'; Con: James Tuttle 38', 47'; Pen: James Tuttle 24'; Jono Lance 76'	Report; Scoreboard	Try: Warrick Gelant 5'; André Warner 25'; Con: Handré Pollard 6', 26'	Referee: Jamie Nutbrown

16 March 2018	Chiefs	41–28	Bulls	FMG Stadium Waikato, Hamilton
19:35	Try: Johnny Fa'auli 9'; Brodie Retallick 36', 56'; Mitchell Brown 43'; Solomon Alaimalo 74'; Anton Lienert-Brown 80'; Con: Damian McKenzie 10', 38', 45', 80'; Pen: Damian McKenzie 63'	Report; Scoreboard	Try: Warrick Gelant 3'; Divan Rossouw 16', 23'; Handré Pollard 38'; Con: Handré Pollard 5', 16', 24', 40'; Cards: Conraad van Vuuren (yellow card) 68' to 78'	Referee: Shuhei Kubo

23 March 2018	Crusaders	33–14	Bulls	AMI Stadium, Christchurch
19:35	Try: Scott Barrett 15'; Codie Taylor 28'; Jack Goodhue 39', 49'; George Bridge 73'; Con: Mitchell Hunt 16', 29', 40', 49'; Cards: Tim Perry (yellow card) 26' to 36'	Report; Scoreboard	Try: Travis Ismaiel 31'; Marco van Staden 69'; Con: Handré Pollard 33', 69'	Referee: Federico Anselmi

31 March 2018	Bulls	33–23	Stormers	Loftus Versfeld, Pretoria
17:15	Try: Adriaan Strauss 6', 17', 46'; Johnny Kôtze 31'; Jesse Kriel 70'; Con: Handré Pollard 8', 32', 47', 70'; Cards: Lizo Gqoboka (yellow card) 80'	Report; Scoreboard	Try: Jan de Klerk 37'; Damian de Allende 40'; Siya Kolisi 66'; Con: Damian Willemse 40'; Pen: Damian Willemse 15', 24'; Cards: Damian de Allende (yellow card) 16' to 26'; Pieter-Steph du Toit (yellow card) 42' to 52'	Referee: Marius van der Westhuizen

14 April 2018	Sharks	10–40	Bulls	Kings Park Stadium, Durban
17:15	Try: André Esterhuizen 39'; Con: Robert du Preez 40'; Pen: Robert du Preez 3'; Cards: Thomas du Toit (yellow card) 48' to 58'	Report; Scoreboard	Try: Warrick Gelant 5', 8', 78'; Adriaan Strauss 25' penalty try 47'; Johnny Kôtze 80'; Con: Handré Pollard 6', 10', 26'; Manie Libbok 79'	Referee: Egon Seconds

21 April 2018	Bulls	28–10	Rebels	Loftus Versfeld, Pretoria
15:05	Try: Adriaan Strauss 6'; Jesse Kriel 23'; Divan Rossouw 40'; André Warner 72'; Con: Handré Pollard 7', 24', 40', 74'	Report; Scoreboard	Try: Michael Ruru 46'; Con: Jack Debreczeni 47'; Pen: Jack Debreczeni 20'	Referee: Ben O'Keeffe

28 April 2018	Bulls	28–29	Highlanders	Loftus Versfeld, Pretoria
17:15	Try: penalty try 21'; Handré Pollard 30'; Jason Jenkins 57'; Jesse Kriel 75'; Con: Handré Pollard 31', 58', 76'	Report; Scoreboard	Try: Aaron Smith 3'; Fletcher Smith 43'; Con: Lima Sopoaga 5', 44'; Pen: Lima Sopoaga 34', 43', 53', 63', 80'; Cards: Fletcher Smith (yellow card) 23' to 33'	Referee: Glen Jackson

5 May 2018	Stormers	29–17	Bulls	DHL Newlands, Cape Town
15:05	Try: Damian Willemse 5'; Wilco Louw 11'; SP Marais 50'; Ramone Samuels 62'; Con: Damian Willemse 7', 51', 63'; Pen: SP Marais 53'; Cards: Ramone Samuels (yellow card) 33' to 43'	Report; Scoreboard	Try: Lood de Jager 20'; Jason Jenkins 48'; Con: Handré Pollard 21', 49'; Pen: Handré Pollard 34'	Referee: Glen Jackson

12 May 2018	Bulls	39–33	Sharks	Loftus Versfeld, Pretoria
17:15	Try: Warrick Gelant 11'; Jesse Kriel 15'; Roelof Smit 27'; Johnny Kôtze 54'; Lood de Jager 65'; Con: Handré Pollard 16', 27', 55', 67'; Pen: Handré Pollard 38', 69'; Cards: RG Snyman (yellow card) 34' to 44'	Report; Scoreboard	Try: Curwin Bosch 23'; Jacques Vermeulen 34'; Jean-Luc du Preez 70'; Con: Robert du Preez 23', 35', 71'; Pen: Curwin Bosch 40'; Robert du Preez 46', 52', 80'; Cards: Curwin Bosch (yellow card) 10' to 20'; Lukhanyo Am (yellow card) 69' to 79'	Referee: Rasta Rasivhenge

19 May 2018	Jaguares	54–24	Bulls	José Amalfitani Stadium, Buenos Aires
18:40	Try: Nicolás Sánchez 7'; Bautista Delguy 40', 55'; Marcos Kremer 48'; Matías Orlando 62'; Sebastián Cancelliere 74'; Emiliano Boffelli 80'; Con: Nicolás Sánchez 8', 40', 49', 56', 80'; Pen: Nicolás Sánchez 14', 18', 46'; Cards: Juan Cruz Mallia (yellow card) 77'	Report; Scoreboard	Try: Warrick Gelant 12'; Nick de Jager 70'; André Warner 78'; Con: Handré Pollard 13'; Manie Libbok 71', 79'; Pen: Handré Pollard 37'	Referee: Federico Anselmi

26 May 2018	Bulls	28–38	Brumbies	Loftus Versfeld, Pretoria
15:05	Try: Handré Pollard 5'; Roelof Smit 19'; Johnny Kôtze 50'; Con: Handré Pollard 6', 20'; Pen: Handré Pollard 47', 54', 64'	Report; Scoreboard	Try: Kyle Godwin 7'; Lachlan McCaffrey 43'; Folau Fainga'a 57'; Tom Banks 71'; Andy Muirhead 76'; Con: Christian Lealiifano 8', 44', 58'; Wharenui Hawera 73', 78'; Pen: Christian Lealiifano 17'; Cards: Folau Fainga'a (red card) 62'	Attendance: 8,189; Referee: Marius van der Westhuizen

30 June 2018	Sunwolves	42–37	Bulls	National Stadium, Singapore
19:55	Try: Hayden Parker 2'; Keisuke Uchida 19'; Gerhard van den Heever 46'; Willie Britz 52'; Michael Little 65'; Rahboni Warren-Vosayaco 75'; Con: Hayden Parker 4', 20', 47', 53', 66', 76'; Cards: Willie Britz (yellow card) 38' to 48'	Report; Scoreboard	Try: Jesse Kriel 23', 28'; Handré Pollard 40'; Conraad van Vuuren 49'; Con: Handré Pollard 24', 28', 40', 50'; Pen: Handré Pollard 42', 60', 71'	Referee: Ben O'Keeffe

7 July 2018	Bulls	43–34	Jaguares	Loftus Versfeld, Pretoria
15:05	Try: Johnny Kôtze 22'; Embrose Papier 35'; Jesse Kriel 40'; Jamba Ulengo 52', 65'; Marco van Staden 57'; Con: Handré Pollard 22', 36', 40', 57', 66'; Pen: Handré Pollard 44'	Report; Scoreboard	Try: Nicolás Sánchez 3'; Pablo Matera 5', 80'; Gonzalo Bertranou 19', 46'; Con: Nicolás Sánchez 6', 20', 47'; Pen: Emiliano Boffelli 63'	Referee: Egon Seconds

14 July 2018	Lions	38–12	Bulls	Emirates Airline Park, Johannesburg
15:05	Try: Ruan Combrinck 18', 65'; Malcolm Marx 31'; Courtnall Skosan 40' penalty try 63'; Aphiwe Dyantyi 80'; Con: Elton Jantjies 19', 40'; Andries Coetzee 80'	Report; Scoreboard	Try: Manie Libbok 7'; Jesse Kriel 12'; Con: Manie Libbok 8'; Cards: Pierre Schoeman (yellow card) 34' to 44'	Referee: Marius van der Westhuizen

== Player statistics ==
The Super Rugby appearance record for players that represented the Bulls in 2018 is as follows:

2018 Bulls player statistics
Player name	HUR	LIO	RED	CHI	CRU	STO	SHA	REB	HIG	STO	SHA	JAG	BRU	SUN	JAG	LIO	QF	SF	F	App	Try	Con	Pen	DG	Pts
Pierre Schoeman	1	1	1	1	1	1	1	1						1	1	1	—	—	—	11	1	0	0	0	5
Jaco Visagie	2	2	2	2	2	16 (substituted in)	16 (substituted in)	16 (substituted in)	16 (substituted in)	16 (substituted in)	16 (substituted in)	16 (substituted in)	2	2	2	2	—	—	—	16	0	0	0	0	0
Frans van Wyk	3	3	3		18 (substituted in)	18 (substituted in)	18 (substituted in)	18 (substituted in)	17	18 (substituted in)	17 (substituted in)	18 (substituted in)					—	—	—	10	0	0	0	0	0
RG Snyman	4	4	4	4			4	4	4	4	4	5	5	5	5	5	—	—	—	14	0	0	0	0	0
Lood de Jager	5	5	5	5	5		5	5	5	5	5						—	—	—	10	3	0	0	0	15
Roelof Smit	6	6	6	6	6	20 (substituted in)	20 (substituted in)	6		20 (substituted in)	6	6	6				—	—	—	12	2	0	0	0	10
Thembelani Bholi	7	7		7		7	7	7	8	8	19 (substituted in)	7	20 (substituted in)	19 (substituted in)	19 (substituted in)	7	—	—	—	14	0	0	0	0	0
Hanro Liebenberg	8	8	7	8	7	8	8							8	8	8	—	—	—	10	0	0	0	0	0
André Warner	9	9	9	9			21 (substituted in)	21 (substituted in)		9	21 (substituted in)	21 (substituted in)	21 (substituted in)	21 (substituted in)			—	—	—	11	3	0	0	0	15
Handré Pollard	10	12	10	10	10	10	10	10	10	10	10	12	10	10	10		—	—	—	15	5	40	13	0	144
Johnny Kôtze	11	11	12	23 (substituted in)	23 (substituted in)	14	14	14	14	14	11	11	11	12	12		—	—	—	15	7	0	0	0	35
Burger Odendaal	12			12	12	12	12	12	12	12	12		12				—	—	—	10	0	0	0	0	0
Jesse Kriel	13	13	13	13	13	13	13	13	13	13	13	13	13	13	13	13	—	—	—	16	8	0	0	0	40
Travis Ismaiel	14	14	14	14	14				23 (substituted in)	23 (substituted in)	14	14	14			14	—	—	—	11	2	0	0	0	10
Divan Rossouw	15	15	23	11	11	11	11	11	11	11	23	23 (substituted in)	23 (substituted in)	11	11	15	—	—	—	14	3	0	0	0	15
Adriaan Strauss	16 (substituted in)	16 (substituted in)	16 (substituted in)	16 (substituted in)	16 (substituted in)	2	2	2	2	2	2	2	16 (substituted in)				—	—	—	13	5	0	0	0	25
Lizo Gqoboka	17 (substituted in)	17 (substituted in)	17 (substituted in)	17 (substituted in)	17 (substituted in)	17 (substituted in)	17 (substituted in)	17 (substituted in)	1	1	1						—	—	—	11	1	0	0	0	5
Conraad van Vuuren	18 (substituted in)	18 (substituted in)		18 (substituted in)					18 (substituted in)	3	18 (substituted in)	3	3	3	3	3	—	—	—	11	1	0	0	0	5
Nick de Jager	19 (substituted in)	19 (substituted in)	8						20 (substituted in)	19 (substituted in)	20 (substituted in)	20 (substituted in)	7	20 (substituted in)	20 (substituted in)	20 (substituted in)	—	—	—	11	1	0	0	0	5
Marco van Staden	20 (substituted in)	20 (substituted in)	20 (substituted in)	20 (substituted in)	20 (substituted in)	6	6	8	6	6	8	8	8	6	6	6	—	—	—	16	2	0	0	0	10
Embrose Papier	21 (substituted in)	21 (substituted in)	21 (substituted in)	21 (substituted in)	9	21 (substituted in)			21 (substituted in)					9	9	21 (substituted in)	—	—	—	10	1	0	0	0	5
Marnitz Boshoff	22 (substituted in)	10	22 (substituted in)														—	—	—	3	0	1	3	0	11
Duncan Matthews	23 (substituted in)		11			23	23 (substituted in)	23 (substituted in)									—	—	—	4	0	0	0	0	0
Francois Brummer		22 (substituted in)															—	—	—	1	0	2	0	0	4
Warrick Gelant		23 (substituted in)	15	15	15	15	15	15	15	15	15	15	15	15	15	12	—	—	—	15	7	0	0	0	35
Trevor Nyakane			18 (substituted in)	3	3	3	3	3	3		3	1	1				—	—	—	10	0	0	0	0	0
Jason Jenkins			19 (substituted in)	19 (substituted in)	4	5	19 (substituted in)	19 (substituted in)	7	7	7	4	4	4			—	—	—	12	2	0	0	0	10
Manie Libbok				22 (substituted in)	22 (substituted in)	22	22 (substituted in)	22 (substituted in)	22	22 (substituted in)	22	10	22 (substituted in)	22	22	10	—	—	—	8	1	4	0	0	13
Tim Agaba					8												—	—	—	1	0	0	0	0	0
Hendré Stassen					19 (substituted in)	4			19			19 (substituted in)					—	—	—	3	0	0	0	0	0
Ivan van Zyl					21 (substituted in)	9	9	9	9	21 (substituted in)	9	9	9		21 (substituted in)	9	—	—	—	11	0	0	0	0	0
Ruben van Heerden						19 (substituted in)							19 (substituted in)		4		—	—	—	3	0	0	0	0	0
Shaun Adendorff								20 (substituted in)									—	—	—	1	0	0	0	0	0
Nqoba Mxoli										17 (substituted in)		17 (substituted in)	17 (substituted in)				—	—	—	3	0	0	0	0	0
JT Jackson												22 (substituted in)					—	—	—	1	0	0	0	0	0
Matthys Basson													18 (substituted in)		17	17 (substituted in)	—	—	—	2	0	0	0	0	0
Jannes Kirsten														7	7	4	—	—	—	3	0	0	0	0	0
Jamba Ulengo														14	14	11	—	—	—	3	2	0	0	0	10
Edgar Marutlulle														16 (substituted in)	16 (substituted in)		—	—	—	2	0	0	0	0	0
Simphiwe Matanzima														17			—	—	—	0	0	0	0	0	0
Mornay Smith														18 (substituted in)	18 (substituted in)	18 (substituted in)	—	—	—	3	0	0	0	0	0
Dries Swanepoel														23 (substituted in)	23	23 (substituted in)	—	—	—	2	0	0	0	0	0
Johan Grobbelaar																16 (substituted in)	—	—	—	1	0	0	0	0	0
Ruan Nortjé																19 (substituted in)	—	—	—	1	0	0	0	0	0
Boeta Hamman																22 (substituted in)	—	—	—	1	0	0	0	0	0
penalty try																				–	2	–	–	–	14
Total																				16	59	47	16	0	441

(c) denotes the team captain. For each match, the player's squad number is shown. Starting players are numbered 1 to 15, while the replacements are numbered 16 to 22. If a replacement made an appearance in the match, it is indicated by (substituted in) . "App" refers to the number of appearances made by the player, "Try" to the number of tries scored by the player, "Kck" to the number of points scored via kicks (conversions, penalties or drop goals) and "Pts" refer to the total number of points scored by the player.

- Aston Fortuin, Ruan Steenkamp and Jade Stighling did not make any appearances.

== See also ==
- Bulls
- 2018 Super Rugby season
