= 2013 Under-19 Provincial Championship =

The 2013 ABSA Under-19 Provincial Championship will be contested from 12 July to 26 October 2013. The tournament will feature the Under-19 players from the fourteen provincial rugby unions in South Africa.

== Competition ==
=== Group A ===
There are seven participating teams in the 2013 ABSA Under-19 Provincial Championship Group A. These teams will play each other twice over the course of the season, once at home and once away.

Teams will receive four points for a win and two points for a draw. Bonus points are awarded to teams that score 4 or more tries in a game, as well as to teams that lose a match by 7 points or less. Teams are ranked by points, then points difference (points scored less points conceded).

The top 4 teams will qualify for the title play-offs. In the semi-finals, the team that finish first has home advantage against the team that finish fourth, while the team that finish second has home advantage against the team that finish third. The winners of these semi-finals will play each other in the final, at the same venue as the 2013 Currie Cup Premier Division Final.

The bottom team in Group A will play a play-off game at home against the winner of the Group B final for a place in Group A in 2014.

=== Group B ===
There are eight participating teams in the 2013 ABSA Under-19 Provincial Championship Group B. These teams will play each other once over the course of the season, either at home or away.

Teams will receive four points for a win and two points for a draw. Bonus points are awarded to teams that score 4 or more tries in a game, as well as to teams that lose a match by 7 points or less. Teams are ranked by points, then points difference (points scored less points conceded).

The top 4 teams will qualify for the title play-offs. In the semi-finals, the team that finish first has home advantage against the team that finish fourth, while the team that finish second has home advantage against the team that finish third. The winners of these semi-finals will play each other in the final, at the same venue as the 2013 Currie Cup First Division Final.

The winner of the final will play a play-off game away from home against the bottom team in Group A for a place in Group A in 2014.

== Teams ==
Location of teams in 2013 ABSA Under-19 Provincial Championship
Group A
Group B

=== Team listing ===
The following teams will take part in the 2012 ABSA Under-19 Provincial Championship competition:

Group A
| Team | Stadium/s |
| Blue Bulls U19 | Loftus Versfeld, Pretoria |
| Border U19 | Buffalo City Stadium, East London |
| Free State U19 | Free State Stadium, Bloemfontein |
| Golden Lions U19 | Ellis Park Stadium, Johannesburg |
| Leopards U19 | Olën Park, Potchefstroom |
| Sharks U19 | Kings Park Stadium, Durban |
| Western Province U19 | Newlands Stadium, Cape Town |

Group B
| Team | Stadium/s |
| Boland U19 | Boland Stadium, Wellington |
| Eastern Province U19 | Nelson Mandela Bay Stadium, Port Elizabeth |
| Falcons U19 | Barnard Stadium, Kempton Park |
| Griquas U19 | Griqua Park, Kimberley |
| Griffons U19 | North West Stadium, Welkom |
| Limpopo Blue Bulls U19 | Peter Mokaba Stadium, Polokwane |
| Pumas U19 | Mbombela Stadium, Mbombela |
| SWD U19 | Outeniqua Park, George |

== Group A ==
=== Log ===
2013 Under-19 Provincial Championship Group A Table
| Pos | Team | Pld | W | D | L | PF | PA | PD | TF | TA | TB | LB | Pts | Qualification |
|---|---|---|---|---|---|---|---|---|---|---|---|---|---|---|
| 1 | Blue Bulls U19 | 12 | 12 | 0 | 0 | 502 | 149 | +353 | 70 | 17 | 8 | 0 | 56 | Qualified to the semi-finals |
| 2 | Golden Lions U19 | 12 | 8 | 0 | 4 | 294 | 239 | +55 | 37 | 31 | 5 | 2 | 39 | Qualified to the semi-finals |
| 3 | Sharks U19 | 12 | 8 | 0 | 4 | 333 | 226 | +107 | 43 | 29 | 5 | 1 | 38 | Qualified to the semi-finals |
| 4 | Leopards U19 | 12 | 5 | 0 | 7 | 297 | 367 | −70 | 45 | 46 | 8 | 4 | 32 | Qualified to the semi-finals |
| 5 | Western Province U19 | 12 | 4 | 1 | 7 | 301 | 289 | +12 | 41 | 39 | 4 | 3 | 25 | |
| 6 | Free State U19 | 12 | 4 | 1 | 7 | 260 | 376 | −116 | 35 | 54 | 5 | 1 | 24 | |
| 7 | Border U19 | 12 | 0 | 0 | 12 | 130 | 471 | −341 | 15 | 70 | 0 | 1 | 1 | Qualified to a relegation play-off game |

Rules for classification:
- 4 points for a win
- 2 points for a draw
- 1 bonus point for a loss by seven points or less
- 1 bonus point for scoring four or more tries in a match

=== Fixtures and results ===
- Fixtures are subject to change.
- All times are South African (GMT+2).

==== Regular season ====
===== Round one =====
| 12 July 2013 | Leopards U19 | 14–61 | Blue Bulls U19 | Olën Park, Potchefstroom |
| 15:00 | Try: Courtney Cupido 14'; Dean Stokes 65'; Con: Cornelius Johannes Swart 15' (1/1); Schalk Hugo 66' (1/1); Cards: Dean Stokes (yellow card) 45' to 55' | Scoreboard | Try: Dan Kriel 1'; Pierre Schoeman 7', 18'; Corniel Els 34'; Jesse Kriel 38', 58'; Arno van Wyk 47'; Nicolaas Jacobus Janse van Rensburg 51'; Leighton-Ras Marcelino van Wyk 54'; Con: Kobus Marais 8', 19', 35', 39', 48', 52', 55' (7/8); Juan-Phillip Smith 59' (1/1); Pen: Kobus Marais (0/1) | Attendance: 100 |

| 13 July 2013 | Border U19 | 24–32 | Sharks U19 | Buffalo City Stadium, East London |
| 13:00 | Try: Funani Brayan Mabala 5'; Johan Gericke 35'; Conor-Terrah Brockschmidt 43'; Con: Werner Barnard 6', 35', 44' (3/3); Pen: Werner Barnard 64' (1/1); Cards: Michael Haley (yellow card) 54' to 65' | Scoreboard | Try: Alrin Eksteen 10'; Sandile Kubekha 14'; Michael Cloete 27'; Thembalethu Ray Williams 40'; Con: Jean-Luc du Plessis 15', 28', 41' (3/4); Pen: Jean-Luc du Plessis 62', 70' (2/3); Cards: Barend Potgieter (yellow card) 69' |

| 13 July 2013 | Free State U19 | 18–18 | Western Province U19 | Free State Stadium, Bloemfontein |
| 15:00 | Try: Len le Roux 40'; Gilbert Chalmers 50'; Con: Pieter Jordaan 41' (1/2); Pen: Pieter Jordaan 59', 6' (2/4) | Scoreboard | Try: Liam Hendricks 27'; Jason Worrall 37'; Con: Chris Smith 28' (1/2); Jason Worrall (0/1); Pen: Jason Worrall (0/1); Chris Smith 56', 11' (2/4) | Attendance: 200 |

Bye/s: Golden Lions U19

===== Round two =====
| 19 July 2013 | Sharks U19 | 13–21 | Golden Lions U19 | Kings Park Stadium, Durban |
| 13:30 | Try: Neil Maritz 34'; Con: Jean-Luc du Plessis 35' (1/1); Pen: Jean-Luc du Plessis 11', 38' (2/4) | Scoreboard | Try: Calvin Wade Smith 14'; Kyle van Dalen 67'; Con: Brandan Hewitt 15' (1/2); Pen: Brandan Hewitt 3', 20', 27' (3/5) | Attendance: 400 |

| 20 July 2013 | Border U19 | 13–29 | Free State U19 | Buffalo City Stadium, East London |
| 10:45 | Try: Oliver Cracknell 31'; Soso Xakalashe 65'; Con: Werner Barnard (0/2); Pen: Werner Barnard 12' (1/1) | Scoreboard | Try: Vuyani Maqina 8'; Nicolaas Jacobus Lee 18'; Barend Jacobus Marx Bornman 21'; Len le Roux 34'; Louis Venter 46'; Con: Len le Roux 19' (1/4); Michael Coenraad Marx 47' (1/1) | Attendance: 500; Referee: Pieter Janse van Vuuren |

| 20 July 2013 | Western Province U19 | 27–28 | Leopards U19 | Newlands Stadium, Cape Town |
| 14:00 | Try: Devon Nash 33'; Jason Worrall 45'; Christiaan Jacobus Mouton 59'; Con: Chris Smith 34', 46', 60' (3/3); Pen: Chris Smith 25', 50' (2/4) | Scoreboard | Try: Chriswill September 10'; Lourens Peter Boddington 37'; Dean Stokes 53'; Schalk Hugo 68'; Con: Cornelius Johannes Swart 11', 38' (2/2); Schalk Hugo 54', 69' (2/2) |

Bye/s: Blue Bulls U19

===== Round three =====
| 26 July 2013 | Leopards U19 | 36–15 | Border U19 | Olën Park, Potchefstroom |
| 15:30 | Try: Dean Stokes 2'; Estehan Visagie 18'; Sias Koen 31'; Jeandré Rudolph 38'; Blessing Makhavhu 59'; Chriswill September 65'; Con: Cornelius Johannes Swart 32', 39' (2/4); Schalk Hugo 66' (1/2) | Scoreboard | Try: Michael Haley 47'; Conor-Terrah Brockschmidt 70'; Con: Werner Barnard 48' (1/2); Pen: Werner Barnard 6' (1/1); Cards: Oliver Cracknell (yellow card) 62' | Referee: François Groenewald |

| 27 July 2013 | Golden Lions U19 | 26–14 | Free State U19 | Ellis Park Stadium, Johannesburg |
| 13:00 | Try: Victor Sekekete 4'; Carlisle Nel 12'; Cyle Justin Brink 16'; Barend Daniel Herbst 52'; Con: Brandan Hewitt 5', 13', 17' (3/4); Cards: Malcolm Marx (red card) 67' | Scoreboard | Try: Jean-Luke Armand van Zyl 46'; Vuyani Maqina 49'; Con: Warren Potgieter 47', 50' (2/2); Cards: Gilbert Chalmers (red card) 67' | Referee: Stephan Geldenhuys |

| 27 July 2013 | Western Province U19 | 10–34 | Blue Bulls U19 | City Park Stadium, Athlone |
| 13:30 | Try: Steven Meiring 23'; Con: Chris Smith 24' (1/1); Pen: Chris Smith 40' (1/1) | Scoreboard | Try: Jesse Kriel 19', 47'; Dan Kriel 44'; Kobus Marais 56'; Con: Kobus Marais 20', 45', 48', 57' (4/4); Pen: Kobus Marais 12', 28' (2/2); Drop: Kobus Marais (0/1); Cards: Juan-Phillip Smith (yellow card) 31' to 41' | Attendance: 0 Referee: Rodney Boneparte |

Bye/s: Sharks U19

===== Round four =====
| 2 August 2013 | Leopards U19 | 27–34 | Golden Lions U19 | Olën Park, Potchefstroom |
| 15:00 | Try: Johannes Albertus Myburgh Breiers 8'; Lloyd Greeff 23'; Dean Stokes 28'; Gysbert Albertus van Wyk 48'; Con: Schalk Hugo (0/1); Cornelius Johannes Swart 24', 49' (2/3); Pen: Cornelius Johannes Swart 56' (1/2) | Scoreboard | Try: Victor Sekekete 13'; Koch Marx 19'; Carlisle Nel 31'; Chad McKay 70'; Con: Brandan Hewitt 14', 20', 32' (3/3); Gabriel du Toit 70' (1/1); Pen: Brandan Hewitt 2', 53' (2/3) | Referee: Archie Sehlako |

| 3 August 2013 | Border U19 | 7–56 | Blue Bulls U19 | Buffalo City Stadium, East London |
| 10:45 | Try: Luzuko Mafu 61'; Con: Michael Haley 62' (1/1); Cards: Michael Haley (yellow card) 14' to 25' | Scoreboard | Try: Hendrik Willem Viljoen 5'; Arno van Wyk 7'; Kobus Marais 11'; Leighton-Ras Marcelino van Wyk 20'; Jesse Kriel 37'; Keagon Gordon 44'; Caswell Khoza 57'; Nqoba Mxoli 70'; Con: Kobus Marais 6', 8', 12', 21', 38', 58', 71' (7/7); Joshua Stander 45' (1/1) | Attendance: 150; Referee: Jaco Kotze |

| 3 August 2013 | Sharks U19 | 55–31 | Free State U19 | Free State Stadium, Bloemfontein |
| 13:00 | Try: Barend Potgieter 4'; Sandile Kubekha 13'; Neil Maritz 24'; Jean-Luc du Plessis 33', 37'; Chris de Beer 42'; Alrin Eksteen 47'; Joseph Oscar Jones 52'; Con: Colin Willemse 5', 14', 34', 38', 43', 53' (6/8); Pen: Colin Willemse (0/1); Jean-Luc du Plessis 63' (1/1) | Scoreboard | Try: Naldo Meyer 11'; Brandon Krause 51'; Nicolaas Jacobus Lee 56'; Boela Venter 70'; Con: Warren Potgieter 12', 52', 57', 70' (4/4); Pen: Warren Potgieter 16' (1/3) | Attendance: 200; Referee: Gerrie de Bruin |

Bye/s: Western Province U19

===== Round five =====
| 9 August 2013 | Leopards U19 | 17–24 | Sharks U19 | Olën Park, Potchefstroom |
| 13:00 | Try: Roche Henry Christopher Steenkamp 18'; Andries Christoffel du Plooy 36', 46'; Con: Cornelius Johannes Swart 37' (1/3) | Scoreboard | Try: Sandile Kubekha 12'; Bart le Roux 32'; Con: Colin Willemse 13' (1/2); Pen: Colin Willemse 22', 41' (2/3); Jean-Luc du Plessis 53', 55' (2/2) | Attendance: 250; Referee: Pieter Janse van Vuuren |

| 9 August 2013 | Blue Bulls U19 | 15–12 | Golden Lions U19 | Loftus Versfeld, Pretoria |
| 15:00 | Try: Pierre Schoeman 50'; Jean Droste 65'; Con: Juan-Phillip Smith 66' (1/2); Pen: Juan-Phillip Smith 33' (1/3) | Scoreboard | Try: Barend Daniel Herbst 30'; Jano Venter 47'; Con: Brandan Hewitt 47' (1/2) | Attendance: 500; Referee: Daniel Fortuin |

| 10 August 2013 | Western Province U19 | 62–0 | Border U19 | Newlands Stadium, Cape Town |
| 14:00 | Try: SP Ferreira 2'; Jason Worrall 13'; Luke van der Smit 24'; Steven Meiring 35'; Gareth Theunis de Bruin 46'; Lindokuhle Michael Mvelase-Julyan 48'; Pieter Eduard Schoonraad 51'; Christiaan Jacobus Mouton 65'; Jonathan Bredell 71'; Con: Chris Smith 3', 14', 25', 36', 47', 65', 72' (7/9); Pen: Chris Smith 10' (1/1) | Scoreboard | Cards: Michael Haley (yellow card) 33' to 43' |

Bye/s: Free State U19

===== Round six =====
| 16 August 2013 | Blue Bulls U19 | 56–21 | Free State U19 | Loftus Versfeld, Pretoria |
| 15:15 | Try: Corniel Els 4'; Keagon Gordon 10'; Pierre Schoeman 33'; Hendrik Willem Viljoen 41'; Rohan Janse van Rensburg 45'; Kobus Marais 48'; Ganfried May 51'; Con: Kobus Marais 5', 11', 34', 42', 46', 48', 51', 56' (8/8) | Scoreboard | Try: Len le Roux 61', 68'; Con: Warren Potgieter 69' (1/2); Pen: Warren Potgieter 23', 30' (2/2); Drop: Warren Potgieter 17' (1/1) | Attendance: 5,000; Referee: Jadezweni Cwengile |

| 17 August 2013 | Border U19 | 3–19 | Golden Lions U19 | Buffalo City Stadium, East London |
| 13:00 | Pen: Werner Barnard 34' (1/2); Cards: Charl Werner Swanepoel (yellow card) 26' to 36'; Conor-Terrah Brockschmidt (yellow card) 52' | Scoreboard | Try: Jaun Jacques Vorster 27', 41'; Thabo Mabuza 59'; Con: Steven du Plessis (0/1); Gabriel du Toit 42' (1/1); Pen: Steven du Plessis (0/1); Cards: Calvin Wade Smith (yellow card) 68' | Referee: Stephan Geldenhuys |

| 17 August 2013 | Western Province U19 | 19–25 | Sharks U19 | Newlands Stadium, Cape Town |
| 15:15 | Try: Ramone Samuels 41'; Joshua Patrick Moon 58'; Jonathan Bredell 65'; Con: Chris Smith 59', 66' (2/3); Pen: Chris Smith (0/1); Jason Worrall (0/1) | Scoreboard | Try: Michael Cloete 37'; Neil Maritz 47'; Cameron Wright 53'; Con: Jean-Luc du Plessis 48', 54' (2/3); Pen: Jean-Luc du Plessis 23' (1/1); Drop: Sandile Kubekha 63' (1/1); Cards: Chris de Beer (yellow card) 60' | Referee: Eduan Nel |

Bye/s: Leopards U19

===== Round seven =====
| 23 August 2013 | Sharks U19 | 19–28 | Blue Bulls U19 | Kings Park Stadium, Durban |
| 13:30 | Try: Barend Potgieter 34'; Con: Jean-Luc du Plessis 35' (1/1); Pen: Jean-Luc du Plessis 1', 22', 41', 43' (4/6) | Scoreboard | Try: Keagon Gordon 18'; Wilco Louw 56'; Pierre Schoeman 63'; Con: Kobus Marais 18', 56' (2/3); Pen: Kobus Marais 5', 15', 61' (3/3) | Attendance: 0 Referee: Oregopotse Rametsi |

| 23 August 2013 | Free State U19 | 16–34 | Leopards U19 | Free State Stadium, Bloemfontein |
| 14:50 | Try: Boela Venter 40'; Con: Stephen Rautenbach 41' (1/1); Pen: Stephen Rautenbach 5', 16', 25' (3/5); Charlton Craig Koopman (0/1) | Scoreboard | Try: Kwena Collins Moremi 11'; Jeandré Rudolph 31'; Lourens Peter Boddington 51', 58'; Blessing Makhavhu 69'; Con: Cornelius Johannes Swart 32' (1/3); Janko Barnard 59', 70' (2/2); Drop: Janko Barnard 66' (1/1); Cards: Jeandré Rudolph (yellow card) 16' to 28' | Attendance: 500; Referee: Cwengile Jadezweni |

| 24 August 2013 | Golden Lions U19 | 31–26 | Western Province U19 | Ellis Park Stadium, Johannesburg |
| 13:00 | Try: Jano Venter 13'; Koch Marx 20'; Carlisle Nel 33', 58'; Con: Brandan Hewitt 13', 20', 34', 58' (4/4); Pen: Brandan Hewitt 4' (1/2) | Scoreboard | Try: Chris Smith 15'; Pieter Eduard Schoonraad 42'; Sebastian Ferreira 66'; Con: Chris Smith 42' (1/3); Pen: Chris Smith 8', 35', 50' (3/4) | Attendance: 300; Referee: Lihan Pretorius |

Bye/s: Border U19

===== Round eight =====
| 30 August 2013 | Blue Bulls U19 | 48–12 | Leopards U19 | Loftus Versfeld, Pretoria |
| 15:00 | Try: Duncan Matthews 6'; Ganfried May 16'; Rohan Janse van Rensburg 20'; Pierre Schoeman 28', 38'; Keagon Gordon 40'; Jean Droste 42'; Riekert Hattingh 66'; Con: Juan-Phillip Smith 7', 17', 41', 43' (4/8); Cards: Arno van Wyk (yellow card) 68' | Scoreboard | Try: Lloyd Greeff 36'; Blessing Makhavhu 75'; Con: Janko Barnard (0/1); Lloyd Greeff 75' (1/1); Drop: Lloyd Greeff (0/1); Janko Barnard (0/1); Cards: Dean Stokes (yellow card) 68' | Attendance: 250; Referee: Rodney Boneparte |

| 31 August 2013 | Sharks U19 | 41–5 | Border U19 | Kings Park Stadium, Durban |
| 13:15 | Try: Jean-Luc du Plessis 11'; Sandile Kubekha 22'; Barend Potgieter 32'; Chris de Beer 53'; Michael Cloete 55', 68'; Con: Jean-Luc du Plessis 23', 54', 56', 69' (4/6); Pen: Jean-Luc du Plessis 4' (1/7); Cameron Wright (0/1) | Scoreboard | Try: Russel Weavill 62'; Con: Riaan Esterhuyzen (0/1); Pen: Werner Barnard (0/6); Luzuko Mafu (0/5); Riaan Esterhuyzen (0/2) | Referee: Stephan Geldenhuys |

| 31 August 2013 | Western Province U19 | 22–5 | Free State U19 | A.F. Markötter Stadium, Stellenbosch |
| 13:30 | Try: Ruan Pieter Rossouw 10'; Chad Solomon 13'; Pieter Eduard Schoonraad 42'; Johan Roual de Villiers 54'; Con: Chris Smith 13' (1/4); Cards: Ramone Samuels (yellow card) 67' | Scoreboard | Try: Barend Jacobus Marx Bornman 70'; Pen: Stephen Rautenbach (0/3) | Referee: Jaco Kotze |

Bye/s: Golden Lions U19

===== Round nine =====
| 6 September 2013 | Golden Lions U19 | 9–25 | Sharks U19 | Ellis Park Stadium, Johannesburg |
| 13:00 | Pen: Brandan Hewitt 3', 18', 57' (3/4) | Scoreboard | Try: Michael Cloete 9'; Thembalethu Ray Williams 28'; Jean-Luc du Plessis 64'; Con: Jean-Luc du Plessis 10', 29' (2/3); Pen: Jean-Luc du Plessis 12' (1/2); Drop: Jean-Luc du Plessis 35' (1/1); Cards: Stefan Hugo van Schalkwyk (yellow card) 17' to 28'; Jean-Luc du Plessis (yellow card) 70' | Attendance: 200; Referee: Gerrie de Bruin |

| 6 September 2013 | Leopards U19 | 36–45 | Western Province U19 | Olën Park, Potchefstroom |
| 17:00 | Try: Andries Christoffel du Plooy 2'; Lloyd Greeff 6', 25'; Dean Stokes 21', 66'; Roche Henry Christopher Steenkamp 55'; Con: Lourens Peter Boddington 3', 7', 26' (3/6) | Scoreboard | Try: Luke van der Smit 8'; Ramone Samuels 17', 33'; Pieter Eduard Schoonraad 41'; Michal Haznar 59'; Dewald Naudé 63'; Con: Chris Smith 9', 18', 34', 42' (4/4); Jason Michael Morris 59' (1/1); Jason Worrall 64' (1/1); Pen: Chris Smith 4' (1/1) | Referee: Lihan Pretorius |

| 7 September 2013 | Free State U19 | 28–20 | Border U19 | Free State Stadium, Bloemfontein |
| 13:00 | Try: Pieter Jordaan 26', 40'; Marthinus Johannes Oosthuizen 31'; Louis Venter 55'; Con: Pieter Jordaan 27', 32', 41', 56' (4/4); Cards: Stefan Roan Koen (yellow card) 48' to 59'; Boela Venter (yellow card) 62' | Scoreboard | Try: Athenkosi Mabinda 37'; Conor-Terrah Brockschmidt 51'; Johannes Jonker 63'; Con: Werner Barnard 38' (1/2); Dylan Rust (0/1); Pen: Werner Barnard 28' (1/2) | Attendance: 100; Referee: Rodney Boneparte |

Bye/s: Blue Bulls U19

===== Round ten =====
| 13 September 2013 | Border U19 | 16–19 | Leopards U19 | Buffalo City Stadium, East London |
| 11:00 | Try: Werner Barnard 53'; Con: Werner Barnard 54' (1/1); Pen: Werner Barnard 31', 38', 69' (3/3); Drop: Werner Barnard (0/1); Cards: Russel Weavill (yellow card) 11' to 21' | Scoreboard | Try: Chriswill September 2'; Jeandré Rudolph 11'; Estehan Visagie 70'; Con: Lourens Peter Boddington 3', 12' (2/3); Cards: Jeandré Rudolph (yellow card) 24' to 34' | Attendance: 20; Referee: Cwengile Jadezweni |

| 13 September 2013 | Free State U19 | 35–34 | Golden Lions U19 | Free State Stadium, Bloemfontein |
| 15:00 | Try: Stephan Janse van Rensburg 9'; Nicolaas Jacobus Lee 19'; Marthinus Johannes Oosthuizen 40'; Donavan Graham Gissing 52'; Henco Wilhelm van der Westhuizen 63'; Con: Pieter Jordaan 10', 41' (2/5); Pen: Pieter Jordaan 3' (1/2); Nicolaas Jacobus Lee 69' (1/1) | Scoreboard | Try: Carlisle Nel 30'; Barend Daniel Herbst 33'; Malcolm Marx 36', 49'; Jano Venter 42'; Con: Brandan Hewitt 34', 43', 50' (3/5); Pen: Brandan Hewitt 23' (1/2); Cards: Chad McKay (yellow card) 65' | Attendance: 200; Referee: Oregopotse Rametsi |

| 14 September 2013 | Blue Bulls U19 | 46–16 | Western Province U19 | Loftus Versfeld, Pretoria |
| 13:15 | Try: Dan Kriel 6', 33'; Juan-Phillip Smith 9'; Dayan van der Westhuizen 17'; Chris Massyn 23'; Ganfried May 51'; Rohan Janse van Rensburg 70'; Con: Juan-Phillip Smith 10', 33', 51', 71' (4/7); Pen: Juan-Phillip Smith 12' (1/1) | Scoreboard | Try: Attie Francois van Rensburg 60'; Con: Chris Smith 61' (1/1); Pen: Chris Smith 5', 18' (2/2); Drop: Chris Smith 30' (1/1) | Attendance: 250; Referee: Pieter Janse van Vuuren |

Bye/s: Sharks U19

===== Round eleven =====
| 20 September 2013 | Blue Bulls U19 | 59–3 | Border U19 | Loftus Versfeld, Pretoria |
| 15:00 | Try: Ngwako Ralepelle 5'; Jacobus Pieter Wolmarans 26'; Rohan Janse van Rensburg 41', 45'; Arend Johannes Bannink 56', 62'; Christiaan van Dijk 60', 70'; Ganfried May 67'; Con: Jacobus Pieter Wolmarans 6', 42', 46' (3/4); Leighton-Ras Marcelino van Wyk 60', 63', 68', 70' (4/5) | Scoreboard | Pen: Werner Barnard 3' (1/3) | Referee: Francois Pretorius |

| 20 September 2013 | Golden Lions U19 | 32–27 | Leopards U19 | Ellis Park Stadium, Johannesburg |
| 15:00 | Try: Thabo Mabuza 20'; Victor Sekekete 41'; Koch Marx 66'; Con: Brandan Hewitt (0/2); Gabriel du Toit 67' (1/1); Pen: Brandan Hewitt 10', 12', 26', 38' (4/4); Gabriel du Toit 70' (1/1) | Scoreboard | Try: Dean Stokes 23', 35'; Blessing Makhavhu 47'; Lloyd Greeff 53'; Con: Lourens Peter Boddington 23', 48' (2/4); Pen: Lourens Peter Boddington 15' (1/1); Cards: Estehan Visagie (yellow card) 39' to 50' | Attendance: 250; Referee: Pieter Janse van Vuuren |

| 21 September 2013 | Sharks U19 | 26–22 | Free State U19 | Kings Park Stadium, Durban |
| 11:30 | Try: Khulu Marwana 2'; Jean-Luc du Plessis 14'; Hendrik Johannes Botha 26'; Wion Jacobus Robbertse 64'; Con: Jean-Luc du Plessis (0/3); Colin Willemse (0/1); Pen: Jean-Luc du Plessis 9', 54' (2/3) | Scoreboard | Try: Boela Venter 33'; Donavan Graham Gissing 50'; Nicolaas Jacobus Lee 60'; Con: Pieter Jordaan 33' (1/1); Warren Potgieter 61' (1/2); Pen: Pieter Jordaan 45' (1/1) | Attendance: 1,000; Referee: Matt Kemp |

Bye/s: Western Province U19

===== Round twelve =====
| 27 September 2013 | Border U19 | 7–36 | Western Province U19 | Buffalo City Stadium, East London |
| 11:00 | Try: Conor-Terrah Brockschmidt 51'; Con: Werner Barnard 52' (1/1); Cards: Ntando Mpofana (yellow card) 28' to 38' | Scoreboard | Try: Pieter Eduard Schoonraad 9', 67'; Ruan Pieter Rossouw 15'; Jason Michael Morris 19'; Ramone Samuels 45'; Chad Solomon 57'; Con: Chris Smith 16', 20', 46' (3/6) | Attendance: 150; Referee: Eduan Nel |

| 27 September 2013 | Sharks U19 | 22–27 | Leopards U19 | Kings Park Stadium, Durban |
| 13:30 | Try: Stefan Hugo van Schalkwyk 2'; Joseph Oscar Jones 20'; Michael Cloete 70'; Con: Colin Willemse 3', 21' (2/3); Pen: Colin Willemse 29' (1/2); Cards: Khulu Marwana (yellow card) 33' to 43' | Scoreboard | Try: Blessing Makhavhu 9', 52'; Jeandré Rudolph 34'; Lourens Peter Boddington 45'; Con: Lourens Peter Boddington 46', 53' (2/4); Pen: Lourens Peter Boddington 17' (1/1) | Referee: Daniel Fortuin |

| 27 September 2013 | Golden Lions U19 | 8–24 | Blue Bulls U19 | Ellis Park Stadium, Johannesburg |
| 14:30 | Try: Carlisle Nel 20'; Con: Gabriel du Toit (0/1); Pen: Gabriel du Toit 5' (1/3) | Scoreboard | Try: Rohan Janse van Rensburg 13'; Keagon Gordon 26'; Duncan Matthews 33'; Con: Jacobus Pieter Wolmarans 14', 27', 34' (3/3); Pen: Jacobus Pieter Wolmarans 47' (1/1) | Attendance: 500; Referee: François Groenewald |

Bye/s: Free State U19

===== Round thirteen =====
| 4 October 2013 | Blue Bulls U19 | 23–13 | Sharks U19 | Loftus Versfeld, Pretoria |
| 15:15 | Try: Dan Kriel 30'; Leighton-Ras Marcelino van Wyk 43'; Duncan Matthews 59'; Con: Kobus Marais 60' (1/3); Pen: Kobus Marais 37', 53' (2/3); Cards: Nqoba Mxoli (red card) 68' | Scoreboard | Try: Michael Cloete 16'; Barend Potgieter 63'; Con: Colin Willemse (0/1); Cameron Wright (0/1); Pen: Colin Willemse 8' (1/5); Cameron Wright (0/1); Cards: Chris de Beer (yellow card) 26' to 36' | Attendance: 250; Referee: Tahla Ntshakaza |

| 4 October 2013 | Leopards U19 | 20–27 | Free State U19 | Olën Park, Potchefstroom |
| 17:00 | Try: Jeandré Rudolph 33', 37'; Marchell Ludwig Hattingh 50'; Sias Koen 59'; Con: Lourens Peter Boddington (0/4) | Scoreboard | Try: Barend Jacobus Marx Bornman 5'; Jean-Luke Armand van Zyl 23'; Louis Venter 45'; Donavan Graham Gissing 64'; Con: Pieter Jordaan 24' (1/2); Warren Potgieter 65' (1/2); Pen: Warren Potgieter 63' (1/1); Cards: Pieter Andries Venter (yellow card) 58' to 68' | Attendance: 100; Referee: Rodney Boneparte |

| 5 October 2013 | Western Province U19 | 13–21 | Golden Lions U19 | Newlands Stadium, Cape Town |
| 09:45 | Try: Jason Worrall 34'; Wesley Adonis 36'; Con: Chris Smith (0/2); Pen: Chris Smith 12' (1/2); Drop: Chris Smith (0/2); Jason Worrall (0/1) | Scoreboard | Try: Koch Marx 39'; Carlisle Nel 63'; Con: Brandan Hewitt 63' (1/2); Pen: Brandan Hewitt 14', 19', 48' (3/3) | Attendance: 1,000; Referee: Christie du Preez |

Bye/s: Leopards U19

===== Round fourteen =====
| 12 October 2013 | Free State U19 | 14–52 | Blue Bulls U19 | Free State Stadium, Bloemfontein |
| 13:00 | Try: Cameron van Heerden 56'; Zee Mkhabela 64'; Con: Warren Potgieter 57', 65' (2/2) | Scoreboard | Try: Hendrik Willem Viljoen 13'; Dan Kriel 20'; Corniel Els 29'; Dayan van der Westhuizen 33'; Ganfried May 65'; Piet-Louw Strauss 67'; Marcus Avril Kleinbooi 69'; Con: Jesse Kriel 14', 21', 30', 34', 66', 68', 70' (7/7); Pen: Jesse Kriel 8' (1/1); Cards: Duncan Matthews (yellow card) 46'; Marcus Avril Kleinbooi (yellow card) 67' | Attendance: 200; Referee: Rodney Boneparte |

| 12 October 2013 | Golden Lions U19 | 47–17 | Border U19 | Ellis Park Stadium, Johannesburg |
| 10:30 | Try: Jano Venter 2', 29'; Francois Petrus van Heerden 22'; Thabo Mabuza 23'; Koch Marx 46'; Sampie Hearn 53', 58'; Con: Brandan Hewitt 3', 22', 24', 30', 47', 53' (6/6); Gerdus van der Walt (0/1) | Scoreboard | Try: Charl Carelse 33'; Devon van Eeden 71'; Con: Dylan Rust 33', 71' (2/2); Pen: Dylan Rust 5' (1/1) | Attendance: 500 |

| 12 October 2013 | Sharks U19 | 38–0 | Western Province U19 | Kings Park Stadium, Durban |
| 15:00 | Try: Alrin Eksteen 2'; Thembalethu Ray Williams 7', 20'; Michael Cloete 10'; Cameron Wright 13'; Wion Jacobus Robbertse 35'; Con: Bart le Roux 3' (1/1); Jean-Luc du Plessis 14', 21' (2/4); Colin Willemse 35' (1/1) | Scoreboard |

Bye/s: Border U19

==== Play-off games ====
===== Semi-finals =====
| 18 October 2013 | Golden Lions U19 | 27–25 | Sharks U19 | Ellis Park Stadium, Johannesburg |
| 16:00 | Try: Malcolm Marx 22'; Jano Venter 28'; Con: Brandan Hewitt 22' (1/2); Pen: Brandan Hewitt 7', 35', 55', 59', 62' (5/5); Cards: Pieter Ernst Scholtz (yellow card) 14' to 24' | Scoreboard | Try: Bart le Roux 14'; Sandile Kubekha 25'; Chris de Beer 45'; Con: Jean-Luc du Plessis 15', 25' (2/3); Pen: Jean-Luc du Plessis 19', 49' (2/3); Cameron Wright (0/1); Cards: Alrin Eksteen (yellow card) 57' | Attendance: 500 |

| 19 October 2013 | Blue Bulls U19 | 37–21 | Leopards U19 | Loftus Versfeld, Pretoria |
| 13:00 | Try: Chris Massyn 16'; Hendrik Willem Viljoen 25'; Wilco Louw 40'; Keagon Gordon 53'; Con: Kobus Marais 17', 26', 41', 54' (4/4); Pen: Kobus Marais 12', 47', 59' (3/3) | Scoreboard | Try: Jeandré Rudolph 3'; Chriswill September 13'; Blessing Makhavhu 66'; Con: Lourens Peter Boddington 3', 14' (2/2); Gysbert Albertus van Wyk 67' (1/1); Cards: Derek Johannes Taylor (yellow card) 65' | Attendance: 1,500 |

===== Final =====
| 26 October 2013 | Golden Lions U19 | 23–35 | Blue Bulls U19 | Newlands Stadium, Cape Town |
| 12:30 | Try: Christiaan Meyer 55'; Malcolm Marx 58'; Con: Brandan Hewitt 56', 59' (2/2); Pen: Jaco van der Walt 6' (1/1); Brandan Hewitt 32' (1/1); Drop: Brandan Hewitt 25' (1/1); Cards: Jano Venter (red card) 54' | Scoreboard | Try: Keagon Gordon 33', 68'; Duncan Matthews 50'; Pierre Schoeman 27'; Con: Kobus Marais 51', 69', 28' (3/4); Pen: Kobus Marais 5', 17', 21' (3/7); Cards: Chris Massyn (red card) 54' | Referee: Rodney Boneparte |

== Group B ==
=== Table ===
2013 Under-19 Provincial Championship Division B Table
| Pos | Team | Pld | W | D | L | PF | PA | PD | TF | TA | TB | LB | Pts | Qualification |
|---|---|---|---|---|---|---|---|---|---|---|---|---|---|---|
| 1 | Falcons U19 | 7 | 7 | 0 | 0 | 267 | 151 | +116 | 37 | 20 | 6 | 0 | 34 | Semi-finals |
| 2 | Boland U19 | 7 | 5 | 0 | 2 | 180 | 169 | +11 | 27 | 23 | 5 | 0 | 25 | Semi-finals |
| 3 | Eastern Province U19 (O) | 7 | 4 | 0 | 3 | 213 | 164 | +49 | 33 | 22 | 5 | 2 | 23 | Promotion play-off Semi-finals |
| 4 | SWD U19 | 7 | 4 | 0 | 3 | 199 | 167 | +32 | 24 | 25 | 3 | 1 | 20 | Semi-finals |
| 5 | Griffons U19 | 7 | 3 | 0 | 4 | 187 | 229 | −42 | 23 | 32 | 3 | 2 | 17 | |
| 6 | Limpopo Blue Bulls U19 | 7 | 2 | 0 | 5 | 209 | 190 | +19 | 32 | 23 | 3 | 3 | 14 | |
| 7 | Griquas U19 | 7 | 3 | 0 | 4 | 171 | 188 | −17 | 22 | 26 | 3 | 2 | 8 (Note: Griquas U19 were deducted 9 points for fielding an unregistered player.) | |
| 8 | Pumas U19 | 7 | 0 | 0 | 7 | 108 | 276 | −168 | 14 | 41 | 0 | 1 | 1 | |

Rules for classification:
- 4 points for a win
- 2 points for a draw
- 1 bonus point for a loss by seven points or less
- 1 bonus point for scoring four or more tries in a match
(O) Qualified for the promotion play-off game

=== Fixtures and results ===
- Fixtures are subject to change.
- All times are South African (GMT+2).

==== Regular season ====
===== Round one =====
| 16 August 2013 | Pumas U19 | 18–46 | Eastern Province U19 | Mbombela Stadium, Mbombela |
| 14:30 | Try: Juandre Enslin van Wyk 24'; Marthinus Philippus Snyman 43'; Con: Juandre Enslin van Wyk 24' (1/2); Pen: Marthinus Philippus Snyman 34' (1/1); Juandre Enslin van Wyk 47' (1/1) | Scoreboard | Try: Stephan Ebersohn 13'; Sherwin Slater 25'; Mzilikazi Khanya 30'; Warren Swartz 32'; Gerrit Huisamen 52'; John-Henry Schmitt 55'; Khaya Malotana 65'; Con: Warren Swartz 33' (1/4); Matthew Moore 52' (1/1); Mitchell Turner 66' (1/1) | Attendance: 250; Referee: Tahla Ntshakaza |

| 16 August 2013 | SWD U19 | 16–18 | Limpopo Blue Bulls U19 | Outeniqua Park, George |
| 15:15 | Try: Macdelin Saayman 21'; Con: Elfrido Ayford 22' (1/1); Pen: Elfrido Ayford 43', 47', 58' (3/4) | Scoreboard | Try: Visscher Andre Strydom 32'; Alistair Grant van Schoor 53'; Zander Richter 55'; Con: Ruan Booyse (0/2); Pen: Ruan Booyse 26' (1/3) | Referee: Rodney Boneparte |

| 17 August 2013 | Griquas U19 | 22–23 | Boland U19 | Griqua Park, Kimberley |
| 13:00 | Try: Juan Pierre le Roux 25'; Christo Coetzee 61'; Johannes Petrus Nel 65'; Con: Christo Coetzee 65' (1/4); Pen: Christo Coetzee (0/1) | Scoreboard | Try: Phil-Lee George 5'; Louis Carstens 14'; Con: Gilbert Newello Abrahams 6' (1/3); Pen: Gilbert Newello Abrahams 12', 28' (2/3); Cards: Deno-Chaunzey Lee-Trevino van Turha (yellow card) 70' | Referee: François Groenewald |

| 17 August 2013 | Griffons U19 | 27–51 | Falcons U19 | North West Stadium, Welkom |
| 11:30 | Try: Dillen Laurent 4'; Riaan Conraad Vermeulen 17'; Brummer Francois Marais 38'; Con: Deon Taljaard 5', 18', 39' (3/3); Pen: Deon Taljaard 22', 51' (2/2); Cards: Brummer Francois Marais (yellow card) 64' | Scoreboard | Try: Jaques Frederick Malan 20'; Elden Schoeman 23'; Franswa Ueckermann 41'; Charlton Anderson 45'; Con: Matthys Cornelius Venter 24', 46', 54', 56', 66' (5/7); Pen: Matthys Cornelius Venter 7', 35' (2/2) | Referee: Matt Kemp |

===== Round two =====
| 23 August 2013 | Eastern Province U19 | 42–20 | Griffons U19 | Nelson Mandela Bay Stadium, Port Elizabeth |
| 14:15 | Try: Khaya Malotana 4'; Lyle Lombard 26'; JP Jamieson 30'; Juandré Fourie 36'; Francois Nel 48'; John-Henry Schmitt 58'; Con: Warren Swarts 5', 27', 31', 37', 49', 59' (6/6) | Scoreboard | Try: Gerrit Otto 8'; Deon Taljaard 69'; Con: Deon Taljaard 9', 70' (2/2); Pen: Deon Taljaard 28', 35' (2/4) | Referee: Francois Pretorius |

| 24 August 2013 | Falcons U19 | 31–20 | Griquas U19 | Barnard Stadium, Kempton Park |
| 11:20 | Try: Ruben Faber 38'; Elden Schoeman 42'; Franswa Ueckermann 56', 70'; Con: Matthys Cornelius Venter 38', 42', 56', 70' (4/4); Pen: Matthys Cornelius Venter 10' (1/1) | Scoreboard | Try: Marthinus Daniel Kemp 24'; McPherson Boitumelo Gert Maketlo 65'; Con: Christo Coetzee 24', 65' (2/2); Pen: Christo Coetzee 19', 40' (2/3) | Attendance: 100; Referee: Ricus van der Hoven |

| 24 August 2013 | Boland U19 | 24–14 | SWD U19 | Boland Stadium, Wellington |
| 12:30 | Try: Marshall Africa 23'; Phil-Lee George 33', 61'; Valentino Wellman 51'; Con: Gilbert Newello Abrahams 34', 62' (2/4); Pen: Gilbert Newello Abrahams (0/1) | Scoreboard | Try: Elfrido Ayford 56'; Jason Mesuur 68'; Con: Elfrido Ayford 57', 69' (2/2); Pen: Elfrido Ayford (0/1); Macdelin Saayman (0/1); Drop: Macdelin Saayman (0/1) | Attendance: 360; Referee: Renier Vermeulen |

| 24 August 2013 | Limpopo Blue Bulls U19 | 62–14 | Pumas U19 | Peter Mokaba Stadium, Polokwane |
| 14:00 | Try: Shaun Potgieter 5'; Ruan Booyse 16'; Zander Richter 24', 50'; Ettienne Visser du Plessis 32'; Visscher André Strydom 39'; Kallie Jantjies 40', 48'; Chris du Plooy 62'; Dean van Heteren 68'; Con: Casper Jan Hendrik du Plessis 25' (1/3); Ruan Booyse 32', 49' (2/2); William Henry Parker 39', 51', 69' (3/5); Pen: Casper Jan Hendrik du Plessis (0/1); Ruan Booyse (0/1) | Scoreboard | Try: Juandre Enslin van Wyk 19'; Deon Michael Joubert 45'; Con: Jaundre Schmidt 20' (1/1); Marthinus Philippus Snyman 45' (1/1); Pen: Jaundre Schmidt (0/1); Juandre Enslin van Wyk (0/1); Cards: Phillip Louis Kriel (yellow card) 31' | Attendance: 100; Referee: Jaco Pretorius |

===== Round three =====
| 30 August 2013 | SWD U19 | 20–50 | Falcons U19 | Outeniqua Park, George |
| 15:00 | Try: Lenes Nomdo 36'; Curtley Duwayne Kiewiet 56'; Hardus Coetzee 66'; Con: Elfrido Ayford 56' (1/3); Pen: Elfrido Ayford 32' (1/1) | Scoreboard | Try: Elden Schoeman 5', 14'; Charlton Anderson 19'; Matthys Cornelius Venter 23'; Andries Schutte 25'; Jean-Claude van Zyl 45'; Franswa Ueckermann 50' penalty try 54'; Con: Matthys Cornelius Venter 5', 14', 19', 23', 54' (5/8) | Attendance: 100; Referee: Eduan Nel |

| 31 August 2013 | Griffons U19 | 22–21 | Pumas U19 | North West Stadium, Welkom |
| 11:10 | Try: Gerrit Otto 12'; Marco Pretorius 21'; Andy Jones 59'; Con: Deon Taljaard 12', 22' (2/3); Pen: Deon Taljaard 7' (1/4) | Scoreboard | Try: Winsin Theron 4'; Deon Michael Joubert 41'; Marthinus Philippus Snyman 53'; Con: Jaundre Schmidt 5', 42', 53' (3/3) | Attendance: 100; Referee: François Groenewald |

| 31 August 2013 | Griquas U19 | 7–26 | Eastern Province U19 | Griqua Park, Kimberley |
| 12:00 | Try: Bjorn Dennis van Wyk 53'; Con: Stefan Erns Schutte 53' (1/1); Pen: Christo Coetzee (0/3); Cards: Jacques Van Zyl (yellow card) 48' to 58' | Scoreboard | Try: Khanya Mzilikazi 24'; Matthew Moore 42'; Francois van der Walt 50'; Warren Swarts 56'; Con: Warren Swarts 24', 42' (2/2); Alex Banfield 50' (1/2) | Referee: Oregopotse Rametsi |

| 31 August 2013 | Limpopo Blue Bulls U19 | 18–22 | Boland U19 | Bela-Bela |
| 14:00 | Try: William Henry Parker 17'; Wade Worthington 52'; Con: William Henry Parker 18' (1/2); Pen: Ruan Booyse 1' (1/1); William Henry Parker 45' (1/2); Cards: Stephanus Smith (yellow card) 48' to 58' | Scoreboard | Try: Valentino Wellman 13'; Brandon Clay Meyer 21'; Edward Wayne Lange 57'; Con: Phil-Lee George 14' (1/2); Willbur Boonzaaier 58' (1/1); Pen: Willbur Boonzaaier 49' (1/3); Cards: Thabo William Ngomane (yellow card) 42' to 52' | Referee: Cwengile Jadezweni |

===== Round four =====
| 6 September 2013 | Eastern Province U19 | 10–35 | SWD U19 | Nelson Mandela Bay Stadium, Port Elizabeth |
| 14:30 | Try: Kevin Kaba 53', 62'; Con: Alex Banfield (0/2); Cards: Stephan Ebersohn (yellow card) 59' | Scoreboard | Try: Dean Peter January 40'; Macdelin Saayman 50'; Curtley Duwayne Kiewiet 64'; Leighton Eksteen 67'; Con: Leighton Eksteen 51', 65', 68' (3/4); Pen: Elfrido Ayford 24' (1/2); Leighton Eksteen 58' (1/1); Drop: Macdelin Saayman 32' (1/1) | Attendance: 150; Referee: Ricus van der Hoven |

| 6 September 2013 | Pumas U19 | 20–31 | Griquas U19 | Mbombela Stadium, Mbombela |
| 14:30 | Try: Wian van Schalkwyk 8'; Shane Pretorius 28'; Michael Chimbila 36'; Con: Jaundre Schmidt 36' (1/2); Pen: Jaundre Schmidt 35' (1/1); Cards: Michael Chimbila (yellow card) 65' | Scoreboard | Try: Johannes Petrus Nel 10', 20'; Ryno Smith 56'; Hillford Monray Clarke 61'; Con: Deon Hendrik van Zyl 10', 20', 56', 61' (4/4); Pen: Deon Hendrik van Zyl 4' (1/2); Marthinus Daniel Kemp (0/1) | Attendance: 350; Referee: Oregopotse Rametsi |

| 7 September 2013 | Falcons U19 | 41–24 | Boland U19 | Barnard Stadium, Kempton Park |
| 11:00 | Try: Dominic Cloete 12'; Franswa Ueckermann 23', 49'; Andries Schutte 31'; Elden Schoeman 44'; Matthys Cornelius Venter 58'; Con: Matthys Cornelius Venter 32', 45', 50', 59' (4/6); Pen: Matthys Cornelius Venter 10' (1/2) | Scoreboard | Try: Louis Carstens 15'; Francois Daniel Pienaar 20'; Chad Kurt Kleinsmidt 27'; Willbur Boonzaaier 63'; Con: Willbur Boonzaaier 15', 28' (2/4); Pen: Willbur Boonzaaier (0/1) | Attendance: 50; Referee: Marlize Jordaan |

| 7 September 2013 | Griffons U19 | 40–38 | Limpopo Blue Bulls U19 | North West Stadium, Welkom |
| 11:30 | Try: David Byron Tippens 20'; Gregan Earl Hull 30'; Deon Taljaard 42'; Jamille Afrika 56'; Brandon Brian Jakaa Kuzatjike 66'; Con: Deon Taljaard 21', 43' (2/4); Ethan Williams 68' (1/1); Pen: Deon Taljaard 2', 24', 54' (3/3) | Scoreboard | Try: Willie Henry Dreyer Lloyd 12'; Zander Richter 16'; Alistair Grant van Schoor 19'; Michael van Damme 51'; Stephanus Smith 62'; Ruan Brink 69'; Con: Ruan Booyse 13', 20' (2/3); Casper Jan Hendrik du Plessis 52' (1/1); Marinus J Gubitz 63' (1/2) | Attendance: 100; Referee: Renier Vermeulen |

===== Round five =====
| 13 September 2013 | Boland U19 | 26–24 | Eastern Province U19 | Boland Stadium, Wellington |
| 12:00 | Try: Anzo John Stubbs 3'; Kennedy Sithsaba Rorwana 7'; Willbur Boonzaaier 45'; Louis Carstens 61'; Con: Willbur Boonzaaier 4', 8' (2/3); Valentino Wellman 62' (1/1) | Scoreboard | Try: Kuhle Mbiko 11'; Dewald Meyer 49'; Francois Nel 57', 67'; Con: Alex Banfield 50' (1/2); Mitchell Turner 58' (1/2); Pen: Alex Banfield (0/1); Cards: Khaya Malotana (yellow card) 41' to 51' | Referee: Tahla Ntshakaza |

| 13 September 2013 | SWD U19 | 55–12 | Pumas U19 | Outeniqua Park, George |
| 15:00 | Try: Simon Petrus Snyman 3'; Leighton Eksteen 11', 48', 69'; Macdelin Saayman 19', 29'; Elroy Albert Havenga 40'; Hendrik Marthinus Jansen Oosthuizen 45'; Con: Leighton Eksteen 12', 20', 30', 41', 46', 49' (6/8); Pen: Leighton Eksteen 6' (1/1) | Scoreboard | Try: Juandre Enslin van Wyk 18'; David Pieterse 38'; Con: Juandre Enslin van Wyk 39' (1/2) | Attendance: 120; Referee: Christie du Preez |

| 14 September 2013 | Griquas U19 | 25–21 | Griffons U19 | Griqua Park, Kimberley |
| 11:00 | Try: Bjorn Dennis van Wyk 14'; Luxolo Koza 48'; Hugo Strydom 69'; Con: Deon Hendrik van Zyl 15', 70' (2/3); Pen: Deon Hendrik van Zyl 33' (1/3); Marthinus Daniel Kemp (0/1); Drop: Deon Hendrik van Zyl 18' (1/1); Cards: Deon Hendrik van Zyl (yellow card) 50' to 60' | Scoreboard | Try: Jaco Conradie 12'; Gregan Earl Hull 41'; Con: Deon Taljaard 42' (1/2); Pen: Deon Taljaard 1', 34', 58' (3/7) | Attendance: 200; Referee: Francois Pretorius |

| 14 September 2013 | Limpopo Blue Bulls U19 | 18–32 | Falcons U19 | Peter Mokaba Stadium, Polokwane |
| 13:00 | Try: Zander Richter 21'; Stephanus Smith 51'; Con: Wade Worthington (0/1); Casper Jan Hendrik Du Plessis 52' (1/1); Pen: Wade Worthington 3' (1/2); Casper Jan Hendrik Du Plessis 40' (1/1); Cards: Ettienne Visser Du Plessis (yellow card) 56' to 66'; Stephanus Smith (yellow card) 60' | Scoreboard | Try: Wietssie J Botes 29'; Willem Johannes Smith 33'; Franswa Ueckermann 57'; Divan Johannes Binneman 61'; Con: Matthys Cornelius Venter 33', 58', 62' (3/4); Pen: Matthys Cornelius Venter 7', 10' (2/4); Cards: Divan Johannes Binneman (yellow card) 44' to 53' | Referee: Rodney Boneparte |

===== Round six =====
| 20 September 2013 | Eastern Province U19 | 39–41 | Falcons U19 | Nelson Mandela Bay Stadium, Port Elizabeth |
| 14:30 | Try: Matthew Moore 22'; Kevin Kaba 29'; Juandré Fourie 43'; Alex Banfield 67'; Con: Selvyn Davids 23', 29', 35', 68' (4/5); Juandré Fourie 43' (1/1); Pen: Selvyn Davids 5', 57' (2/2); Warren Swartz 56' (1/1); Cards: JP Jamieson (yellow card) 69' | Scoreboard | Try: Dominic Cloete 14', 55'; Ruan Ernst 24'; Charlton Anderson 30'; Jaques Frederick Malan 33'; Divan Johannes Binneman 60'; Con: Matthys Cornelius Venter 31', 55', 61', 65' (4/6); Pen: Matthys Cornelius Venter 71' (1/1); Drop: Matthys Cornelius Venter (0/1); Cards: Jeandré Roux (yellow card) 20' to 31' | Attendance: 1,000; Referee: Eduan Nel |

| 21 September 2013 | Pumas U19 | 20–39 | Boland U19 | Mbombela Stadium, Mbombela |
| 11:15 | Try: Wian van Schalkwyk 2'; Marthinus Philippus Snyman 49'; Con: Jaundré Schmidt 3', 50' (2/2); Pen: Jaundré Schmidt 32' (1/1); Drop: Marthinus Philippus Snyman 19' (1/1); Cards: Juandre Enslin van Wyk (yellow card) 44' to 54' | Scoreboard | Try: Valentino Wellman 22', 30'; Deno-Chaunzey Lee-Trevino van Turha 56'; Brandon Clay Meyer 62'; Anzo John Stubbs 66'; Con: Willbur Boonzaaier 31', 57', 62', 67' (4/5); Pen: Willbur Boonzaaier 10', 42' (2/3) | Attendance: 250; Referee: Lihan Pretorius |

| 21 September 2013 | Griffons U19 | 27–30 | SWD U19 | North West Stadium, Welkom |
| 11:30 | Try: David Byron Tippens 14', 24', 68'; David Francois van Biljon 31'; Con: Deon Taljaard 15', 32' (2/3); David Francois van Biljon (0/1); Pen: David Francois van Biljon 50' (1/1) | Scoreboard | Try: Lodewikus van Zyl Oosthuizen 17'; Leighton Eksteen 48'; Brandon Haas 52'; Con: Leighton Eksteen 18', 49', 53' (3/3); Pen: Leighton Eksteen 8', 36', 41' (3/3) | Attendance: 100; Referee: Oregopotse Rametsi |

| 21 September 2013 | Griquas U19 | 40–38 | Limpopo Blue Bulls U19 | Itech Park, Kimberley |
| 13:00 | Try: Luxolo Koza 30'; Marthinus Daniel Kemp 39', 72'; Ryno Smith 63'; McPherson Boitumelo Gert Maketlo 65'; Con: Deon Hendrik van Zyl (0/2); Christo Coetzee 63', 65', 72' (3/3); Pen: Deon Hendrik van Zyl 6', 15' (2/2); Christo Coetzee 69' (1/1); Cards: Ryno Smith (yellow card) 35' to 45' | Scoreboard | Try: Alistair Grant van Schoor 23', 35'; Willie Henry Dreyer Lloyd 33'; Johannes Hendrik Smit 49'; Wade Worthington 52'; Sipho Dougeld Siboza 56'; Con: William Henry Parker 23', 34', 35', 56' (4/6); Cards: Dirk Pieter Badenhorst (yellow card) 63' | Attendance: 50; Referee: Rodney Boneparte |

===== Round seven =====
| 27 September 2013 | Boland U19 | 22–30 | Griffons U19 | Boland Stadium, Wellington |
| 11:00 | Try: Louis Carstens 23'; Phil-Lee George 25'; Francois Daniel Pienaar 46'; Valentino Wellman 50'; Con: Willbur Boonzaaier 24' (1/3); Valentino Wellman (0/1); Pen: Daylin Carlo Johnson (0/1); Cards: Phil-Lee George (yellow card) 7' to 17'; JC Genade (yellow card) 63' | Scoreboard | Try: Damien Cheswill May 18'; Deon Taljaard 30'; Andy Jones 56'; Gregan Earl Hull 66'; Con: Deon Taljaard 32', 67' (2/3); David Francois van Biljon (0/1); Pen: Deon Taljaard 22', 64' (2/5) | Attendance: 250; Referee: Christie du Preez |

| 27 September 2013 | SWD U19 | 29–26 | Griquas U19 | Outeniqua Park, George |
| 13:00 | Try: Elroy Albert Havenga 46', 53'; Leighton Eksteen 56'; Curtley Duwayne Kiewiet 65'; Con: Leighton Eksteen 47', 57' (2/3); Johan Steyn 66' (1/1); Pen: Leighton Eksteen 30' (1/2); Cards: Leighton Eksteen (yellow card) 59' | Scoreboard | Try: Ryno Smith 32'; Willem Jacobus Van Aswegen 37'; Johannes Petrus Nel 61'; Con: Deon Hendrik van Zyl (0/2); Christo Coetzee 62' (1/1); Pen: Deon Hendrik van Zyl 3', 24', 26' (3/3) | Attendance: 50; Referee: Ruhan Meiring |

| 27 September 2013 | Falcons U19 | 21–3 | Pumas U19 | Barnard Stadium, Kempton Park |
| 11:00 | Try: Willem Johannes Smith 47'; Elden Schoeman 56'; Charlton Anderson 63'; Con: Matthys Cornelius Venter 48', 58', 65' (3/3) | Scoreboard | Pen: Jaundré Schmidt 26' (1/3) | Referee: Oregopotse Rametsi |

| 28 September 2013 | Limpopo Blue Bulls U19 | 17–26 | Eastern Province U19 | Groblersdal |
| 14:00 | Try: Stephanus Smith 25'; Willie Henry Dreyer Lloyd 42'; Wade Worthington 68'; Con: Casper Jan Hendrik du Plessis 43' (1/2); Kean Henning Dry (0/1) | Scoreboard | Try: Khaya Molotana 35'; Wayburn Howley 56'; Juandré Fourie 64'; Con: Francois Nel (0/1); Jason Baggott 65' (1/2); Pen: Jason Baggott 6', 20', 41' (3/3); Francois Nel (0/1) | Attendance: 100; Referee: Stephan Geldenhuys |

==== Play-off games ====
===== Semi-finals =====
| 4 October 2013 | Boland U19 | 30–45 | Eastern Province U19 | Boland Stadium, Wellington |
| 14:00 | Try: Francois Daniel Pienaar 38'; Deno-Chaunzey Lee-Trevino van Turha 67'; Anzo John Stubbs 23', 36'; Con: Willbur Boonzaaier 24', 37' (2/3); Anzo John Stubbs (0/1); Pen: Willbur Boonzaaier 14', 31' (2/2) | Scoreboard | Try: Juandré Fourie 8'; Sergeal Petersen 11', 26'; Alex Banfield 35'; Khaya Molotana 55'; Selvyn Davids 64'; Con: Selvyn Davids 9', 12', 27', 35', 56', 65' (6/6); Pen: Alex Banfield 1' (1/1) | Attendance: 200; Referee: Jaco Pretorius |

| 4 October 2013 | Falcons U19 | 29–24 | SWD U19 | Isak Steyl Stadium, Vanderbijlpark |
| 16:00 | Try: Elden Schoeman 9'; Jaques Frederick Malan 62'; Con: Matthys Cornelius Venter 11', 63' (2/2); Pen: Matthys Cornelius Venter 22', 35', 50', 60', 65' (5/5); Drop: Matthys Cornelius Venter (0/2) | Scoreboard | Try: Elroy Albert Havenga 13'; Lee-Roy Pojie 28'; Con: Johan Steyn 14' (1/1); Lee-Roy Pojie (0/1); Pen: Lee-Roy Pojie 18' (1/1); Johan Steyn 32', 45', 52' (3/3); Cards: Brandon Haas (yellow card) 49' to 60' | Attendance: 220; Referee: Renier Vermeulen |

===== Final =====
| 11 October 2013 | Falcons U19 | 40–56 | Eastern Province U19 | Mbombela Stadium, Mbombela |
| 14:20 | Try: Marthinus Phillipus Ueckermann 19'; Jean-Claude van Zyl 38'; Andries Schutte 52'; Franswa Ueckermann 60'; Con: Matthys Cornelius Venter 20', 38', 52', 61' (4/4); Pen: Matthys Cornelius Venter 9', 13' (2/2); Drop: Matthys Cornelius Venter 17', 64' (2/2) | Scoreboard | Try: Selvyn Davids 3', 34', 71'; Matthew Moore 10'; Khaya Malotana 28', 62', 64'; Sergeal Petersen 35'; Con: Selvyn Davids 11', 29', 34', 65', 72' (5/8); Pen: Selvyn Davids 50', 68' (2/2) | Attendance: 245 |

== Promotion/relegation play-off ==
| 19 October 2013 | Border U19 | 20–27 | Eastern Province U19 | Buffalo City Stadium, East London |
| 11:00 | Try: Oliver Cracknell 2'; Dylan Rust 32'; Charl Werner Swanepoel 63'; Con: Werner Barnard 33' (1/3); Pen: Werner Barnard 5' (1/1); Drop: Werner Barnard (0/1); Cards: Dylan Rust (yellow card) 44' to 55'; Athenkosi Mabinda (yellow card) 54' to 64' | Scoreboard | Try: Sergeal Petersen 15'; Sherwin Slater 41'; Alex Banfield 46'; Con: Selvyn Davids 16', 42', 47' (3/3); Pen: Selvyn Davids 36', 69' (2/5); Alex Banfield (0/2); Cards: Similile Qinela (red card) 54'; JP Jamieson (yellow card) 54' to 64' | Attendance: 150 |

- Eastern Province U19 promoted to Group A.
- Border U19 relegated to Group B.

== See also ==
- 2013 Currie Cup Premier Division
- 2013 Currie Cup First Division
- 2013 Vodacom Cup
- 2013 Under-21 Provincial Championship
