= Thabo Mabuza =

South African rugby union player

- Full name: Sikhumbuzo Thabo Mabuza
- Born: 1 February 1994 (age 32) Nelspruit, South Africa
- Height: 1.82 m (5 ft 11 1/2 in)
- Weight: 90 kg (14 st 2 lb; 198 lb)
- School: Hoërskool Centurion, Centurion

Rugby union career
- Position: Openside flanker
Youth career
- 2007: Pumas
- 2010–2012: Blue Bulls
- 2013–2015: Golden Lions
Senior career
Years	Team	Apps	(Points)
2014–2015	Golden Lions XV	7	(15)
2016	Griquas	7	(5)
2017–present	Falcons	29	(95)
- Correct as of 25 August 2019
International career
Years	Team	Apps	(Points)
2011–2012	South Africa Schools	4	(0)
2014	South Africa Under-20	1	(0)
- Correct as of 21 May 2014

Sikhumbuzo Thabo Mabuza (born 1 February 1994 in Nelspruit, South Africa) is a South African rugby union player for the Falcons in the Currie Cup and the Rugby Challenge. He generally plays as an openside flanker.

== Career ==
=== Youth ===
Born in Nelspuit and attending the White River Primary School in Mpumalanga, Mabuza was chosen to play for the Pumas at the Under-13 Craven Week tournament in 2007.

He then went to Centurion High School, where he was selected for youth teams for the Blue Bulls. In 2010, he represented them at the Under-16 Grant Khomo Week in Upington and he played for them in the Under-18 Craven Week tournament in both 2011 and 2012.

In both seasons, he was also selected for the South African Schools side. In 2011, he played in a 21–14 victory against a France Under-18 side in Port Elizabeth and in 2012, he started in three matches – against France, Wales and England Under-18.

Mabuza then made the move across the Jukskei River to join Johannesburg-based side the Golden Lions for the 2013 season. He made thirteen appearances for the Golden Lions U19 side during the 2013 Under-19 Provincial Championship competition, helping them reach the final of the competition, where they lost 35–23 to the Blue Bulls U19 in Cape Town.

In 2014, Mabuza was included in the South Africa Under-20 squad for the 2014 IRB Junior World Championship to be held in New Zealand.

=== Golden Lions ===
Mabuza had a remarkable start to his first class career. He started the Golden Lions' opening match of the 2014 Vodacom Cup competition against the Leopards in Potchefstroom on 7 March 2014. The Leopards led 16–3 shortly before the hour mark when Mabuza scored two tries in a four-minute spell to bring the Golden Lions back into the game and eventually helped them narrowly win the match 18–16. A further three starts and two substitute appearances followed as the Golden Lions made it all the way to the final before losing to Griquas, another match that Mabuza featured in.
