= Luxolo Koza =

South African rugby union player (born 1994)

- Born: 18 September 1994 (age 32) Port Elizabeth, South Africa
- Height: 1.89 m (6 ft 2 1/2 in)
- Weight: 112 kg (17 st 9 lb; 247 lb)
- School: Muir College, Uitenhage
- Occupation: Professional rugby player

Rugby union career
- Position: Loosehead Prop / Utility forward
- Current team: Eastern Province Elephants
Youth career
- 2011–2012: Eastern Province Kings
- 2013–2015: Griquas
Senior career
Years	Team	Apps	(Points)
2014–2016	Griquas	12	(0)
2017–2018	SWD Eagles	22	(0)
2019–2021	Falcons	21	(0)
2021–2022	Valence D'Agen	9	(0)
2022–	Eastern Province Elephants		
- Correct as of 29 March 2022

Luxolo Koza (born 18 September 1994) is a South African professional rugby union player for the Falcons in the Currie Cup and the Rugby Challenge. He is a utility forward, but has mainly played as a loosehead prop in first class rugby.

== Career ==
=== Eastern Province ===
As a scholar at Muir College in Uitenhage, Koza was selected to represent Eastern Province at the Under-18 Craven Week tournament. He earned a selection for both the 2011 tournament held in Kimberley and the 2012 tournament held in Port Elizabeth, mainly playing as a lock for Eastern Province.

In both these seasons, he also represented the Eastern Province U19s in the annual Under-19 Provincial Championship. In 2011, he made three appearances but could not prevent Eastern Province finish rock bottom of Division B. He appeared on two occasions in 2012 – now mainly playing as a loose forward – as Eastern Province U19 reached the final of the competition where they lost to near neighbours Border U19.

=== Griquas ===
After finishing school, Koza moved to Kimberley to join Griquas for the 2013 season. He represented Griquas U19 in the 2013 Under-19 Provincial Championship making four starts as a loose forward and scoring tries in consecutive matches against Griffons U19 and Limpopo Blue Bulls.

His first class debut came for Griquas during the 2014 Vodacom Cup competition. He played off the bench in their 26–24 victory over the Blue Bulls in Pretoria. After a further substitute appearance the following week against the Griffons, he made his first senior start (now playing as a loosehead prop) in their 68–13 defeat of the Limpopo Blue Bulls in Kimberley and also started their home match against the Golden Lions in the same competition.

Koza was also named in their squad for the 2014 Currie Cup qualification tournament and made his debut in that competition in their 52–5 victory against the Border Bulldogs. Griquas went on to win the qualification tournament and clinch a spot in the 2014 Currie Cup Premier Division, but Koza played no part in that competition, instead reverting to the Griquas U21 side where he started all seven of his side's matches during the 2014 Under-21 Provincial Championship.

Koza made two starts and one appearance off the bench during the 2015 Vodacom Cup competition, helping them finish in second position on the Northern Section log, before they lost in the semi-finals to the Pumas. In the second half of 2015, he was once again mainly used by the Griquas U21 side, starting seven matches for them in the 2015 Under-21 Provincial Championship Group B, as they reached the semi-finals before losing to Limpopo Blue Bulls U21. He missed one match during their season due to his involvement with the senior side; on 29 August 2015, he made his Currie Cup debut, coming on as a replacement just after the hour mark in their 32–46 defeat to the Blue Bulls in Round Four of the 2015 Currie Cup Premier Division.

=== Pumas ===
Koza moved to Nelspruit during 2016 to join the Pumas.
