= Corniel Els =

South African rugby union player

- Full name: Cornelius Wilhelmus Els
- Born: 19 January 1994 (age 32) Polokwane, South Africa
- Height: 1.84 m (6 ft 1/2 in)
- Weight: 110 kg (17 st 5 lb; 243 lb)
- School: Grey College, Bloemfontein
- University: University of Pretoria
- Occupation: Rugby Player

Rugby union career
- Position: Hooker
Youth career
- 2010–2012: Free State Cheetahs
- 2013–2015: Blue Bulls
Amateur team(s)
Years	Team	Apps	(Points)
2014–2016	UP Tuks	14	(15)
Senior career
Years	Team	Apps	(Points)
2015	Blue Bulls	10	(10)
2016–2018	Blue Bulls XV	17	(25)
2019–2020	Bulls	15	(0)
2019	Pumas	7	(15)
2019–2021	Blue Bulls	3	(0)
2021–2023	Benetton	23	(30)
- Correct as of 23 Apr 2022
International career
Years	Team	Apps	(Points)
2014	South Africa Under-20	4	(5)
- Correct as of 11 Apr 2018

Cornelius Wilhelmus Els (born 19 January 1994) is a retired South African professional rugby union player. His regular position was hooker.

== Career ==
=== Youth / Free State ===
Els attended and played rugby for Grey College in Bloemfontein and was selected to represent the Free State at the Under-16 Grant Khomo Week in 2010 and once again at the premier high school rugby union competition in South Africa – the Under-18 Craven Week – held in Port Elizabeth in 2012.

=== Blue Bulls ===
After school, Els moved to Pretoria to join the Blue Bulls academy. He was the first-choice hooker for the Blue Bulls U19 side in the 2013 Under-19 Provincial Championship and started ten of their fourteen matches during the campaign and played off the bench in one further match. He scored a try in his very first match for them against the Leopards U19 and one in each of their matches against his former side, the Free State. His performances contributed to the Blue Bulls finishing the round-robin stage of the season with twelve wins out of twelve to qualify for the title play-offs. He started both their 37–21 win against the Leopards in the semi-final and in the final, where they won the competition by beating trans-Jukskei rivals Golden Lions U19s 35–23.

At the beginning of 2014, Els represented Pretoria-based university side UP Tuks in the 2014 Varsity Cup competition. He played in six of their seven matches as they finished in sixth spot and outside the semi-final places. Shortly after the Varsity Cup campaign, Els was named in the South African Under-20 squad as they prepared for the 2014 IRB Junior World Championship in New Zealand. He was not on the bench for their first pool stage match against Scotland, but failed to come on as a replacement. However, he was promoted to the starting line-up for their second match against New Zealand, helping them to a 33–24 win over the hosts, and also started their final pool stage match against Samoa as South Africa won 21–8 to qualify for the semi-finals. He started their semi-final match where they once again faced New Zealand and provided a crucial contribution in the match; with the score tied at 25–all with three minutes to go in the match, Els scored a late try which was converted by Handré Pollard to secure a 32–25 victory for South Africa and a place in the final. He also started the final, but could not prevent South Africa losing 20–21 to England to finish the competition as runners-up.

Shortly after his return to South Africa, Els was rewarded with a new contract with the Blue Bulls, keeping him in Pretoria until the end of 2016.

The following year, Els was included in the Blue Bulls squad for the 2015 Vodacom Cup competition. He made his domestic first class debut by playing off the bench in the final few minutes of a 20–18 victory over eventual champions the Pumas. He also came on as a replacement for the final half an hour of their next match against Namibian side the Welwitschias in Windhoek and scored a try within a minute of coming onto the field. He also scored a second try later in the match to help secure a 44–0 victory for the Blue Bulls. He made his first senior start in their 83–13 win over the Limpopo Blue Bulls in their final match in the round-robin stage of the competition to help the Blue Bulls finish second in the Northern Section to qualify for the quarter-finals. Els came on as a replacement in their 44–21 quarter final victory over the Free State XV, as well as their semi-final match against Western Province, which the team from Cape Town won 10–6 to eliminate the Blue Bulls from the competition.

Els was included in the Blue Bulls' senior squad for the 2015 Currie Cup Premier Division and was named as the hooker replacement for their Round Four match against Griquas in Kimberley.

Until 2020 he played with Bulls in Super Rugby and with Blue Bulls in the Currie Cup.

=== Benetton Treviso ===
In January 2021 Els signed for Italian team Benetton Treviso. I played until 2022−2023 season; on the 11th of Mat 2023 Els announced that he will retire from professional rugby for the consequences of a critical injury in order to became team manager for the team of Treviso.
