= Johannes Jonker =

South African rugby union player

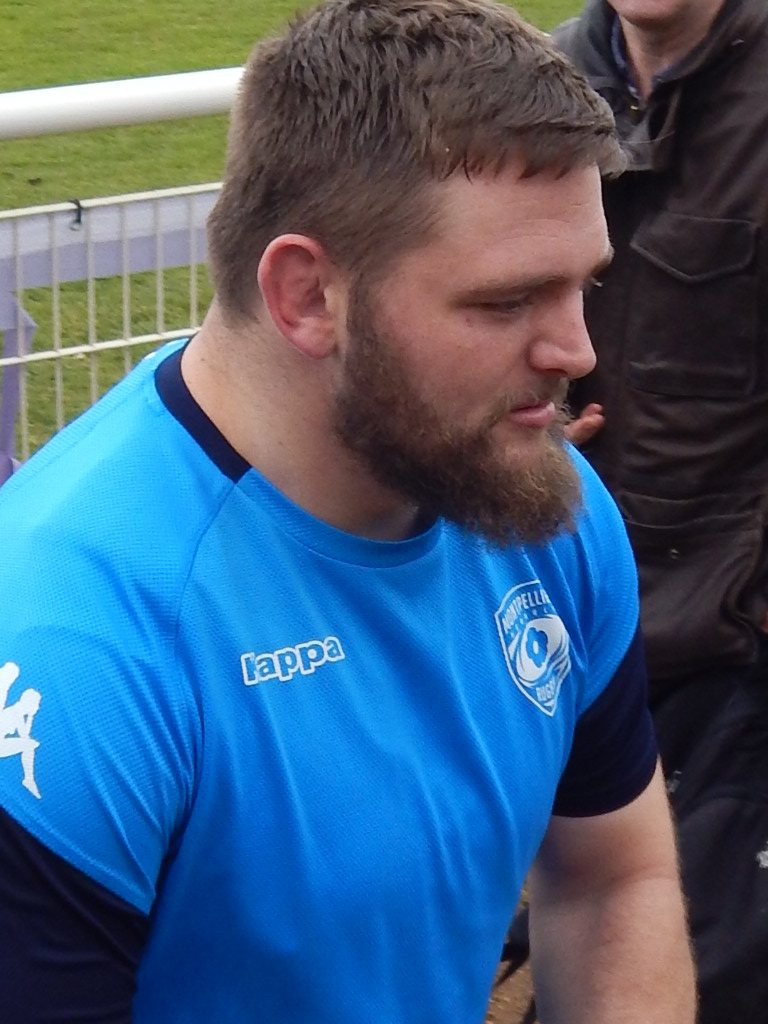
- Full name: Johannes Gideon Andries Jonker
- Born: 22 August 1994 (age 32) East London, South Africa
- Height: 1.84 m (6 ft 1/2 in)
- Weight: 118 kg (18 st 8 lb; 260 lb)
- School: Hudson Park High School, East London

Rugby union career
- Position: Prop
- Current team: Lions / Golden Lions / Golden Lions XV
Youth career
- 2007–2014: Border Bulldogs
Senior career
Years	Team	Apps	(Points)
2014–2016	Border Bulldogs	43	(25)
2016–present	Lions	37	(0)
2017–present	Golden Lions XV	2	(0)
2017–present	Golden Lions	16	(0)
2017–2018	→ Montpellier	9	(0)
- Correct as of 8 September 2019

Johannes Gideon Andries Jonker (born 22 August 1994 in East London, South Africa) is a South African rugby union player for the Lions in Super Rugby, the Golden Lions in the Currie Cup and the Golden Lions XV in the Rugby Challenge. His regular position is prop.

== Career ==
=== Youth ===
Jonker was selected to represent Border in several youth tournaments. In 2007, he played for them in the Under-13 Craven Week competition, in 2010 he played at the Under-16 Grant Khomo Week and in 2012 he played at the Under-18 Craven Week competition.

He subsequently joined their academy and played for the Border U19 side in the 2012 and the 2013 Under-19 Provincial Championships. He helped them win promotion from Division B to Division A in 2012, but was also part of the side that got relegated back to Division B in 2013.

=== Border Bulldogs ===
His first class debut came during the 2014 Vodacom Cup competition. With the Border Rugby Football Union in financial strife, they only had eleven contracted players on their books and gave opportunities to some of their academy players, with Jonker being one of those. He made his debut in their Round One match against the Sharks XV in East London. He started all seven of their matches in the competition and also scored his first try in their final match against the Boland Cavaliers in Piketberg.

His performances in that competition also led to his inclusion in the Border Bulldogs squad for the 2014 Currie Cup qualification series and he made his Currie Cup debut in the opening match of that competition by coming on as a second-half substitute in their match against Griquas in Kimberley.

=== Montpellier ===
In November 2017, Jonker joined French Top 14 side Montpellier Hérault Rugby as a medical joker replacement for the injured Jannie du Plessis.
