= Jano Venter =

South African rugby union player (born 1994)

- Born: 8 January 1994 (age 32) Witbank, South Africa
- Height: 1.93 m (6 ft 4 in)
- Weight: 116 kg (18 st 4 lb; 256 lb)
- School: HTS Middelburg, Middelburg

Rugby union career
- Position: Number eight
- Current team: Yakultlevis
Youth career
- 2010–2012: Pumas
- 2013–2015: Golden Lions
Senior career
Years	Team	Apps	(Points)
2015–2017	Golden Lions XV	16	(45)
2015–2017	Golden Lions	6	(0)
2017–2018	Blue Bulls	13	(15)
2018	Blue Bulls XV	5	(5)
2019–2021	Shimizu Koto Blue Sharks	8	(10)
- Correct as of 22 February 2021
International career
Years	Team	Apps	(Points)
2012	South Africa Schools	3	(0)
- Correct as of 14 April 2018

Jano Venter (born 8 January 1994) is a South African professional rugby union player for the Bulls in Super Rugby and the Blue Bulls XV in the Rugby Challenge. His regular position is number eight.

== Career ==
=== Youth / Pumas ===
At high school level, Venter was selected to represent the Pumas at the 2010 Under-16 Grant Khomo Week and again at the 2012 Under-18 Craven Week, the premier high school rugby union competition in South Africa. After the Craven Week, he was also selected to represent a South Africa Schools team that played in the 2012 Under-18 International Series held in the Western Cape against European opposition. He played in all three of South Africa's matches in the competition, starting their 17–7 victory over France and their 24–16 victory over Wales and came on as a second-half replacement in their 36–29 victory over England.

=== Golden Lions ===
After high school, Venter joined the youth setup of Johannesburg-based side the Golden Lions. He started thirteen of the Golden Lions U19 side's fourteen matches during the 2013 Under-19 Provincial Championship; eleven of those appearances came during the round-robin stage of the competition as the Golden Lions finished second on the log to qualify for the semi-finals, with Venter scoring tries in their matches against the Blue Bulls U19, Western Province U19, Free State U19 and two tries in their match against Border U19. He scored another try in their semi-final match against the Sharks U21, which ultimately proved to be decisive as the Golden Lions ran out 27–25 winners. He also started the final of the competition against the Blue Bulls U19, but his participation ended in the 54th minute of a match when Venter and his Blue Bulls counterpart Chris Massyn were both sent off after several punches were thrown. The Golden Lions eventually lost the match 23–35 to finish as runners-up in the competition.

Venter moved up to the Golden Lions U21 age-group in 2014 and made five appearances for them in the 2014 Under-21 Provincial Championship. He scored one try in their match against the Leopards as the Golden Lions finished in third spot to clinch a semi-final berth. Venter came on as a replacement in their semi-final against the Blue Bulls U21, but could not prevent them suffering a 19–23 defeat.

Venter was included in the Golden Lions' squad for the 2015 Vodacom Cup competition and made his first class debut on 13 March 2015, starting their match against the Limpopo Blue Bulls in Polokwane as the Golden Lions ran out 31–21 winners. He featured in victories against the Falcons in Kempton Park and former side the Pumas in Nelspruit and then also started in their home match against the Leopards, scoring two tries midway through the second half as the Golden Lions ran out 63–10 winners. He emulated that in their very next match, scoring two tries early in the match to beat the Griffons 36–20 in Welkom. The Golden Lions finished top of the Northern Section log to qualify for the play-off stage of the competition. Venter started their quarter final match against the SWD Eagles as they secure a 29–21 win and played off the bench in their semi-final match against the Pumas, which the side from Nelspruit won 43–20.

Venter reverted to the Golden Lions U21 side for the 2015 Under-21 Provincial Championship and made six appearances, scoring three tries (two of those against the Eastern Province U21s in a 73–14 win in Port Elizabeth) before he was named on the bench for the Golden Lions for their 2015 Currie Cup Premier Division match against the Pumas in Nelspruit.
