= Pierre Schoeman =

Scotland international rugby union player

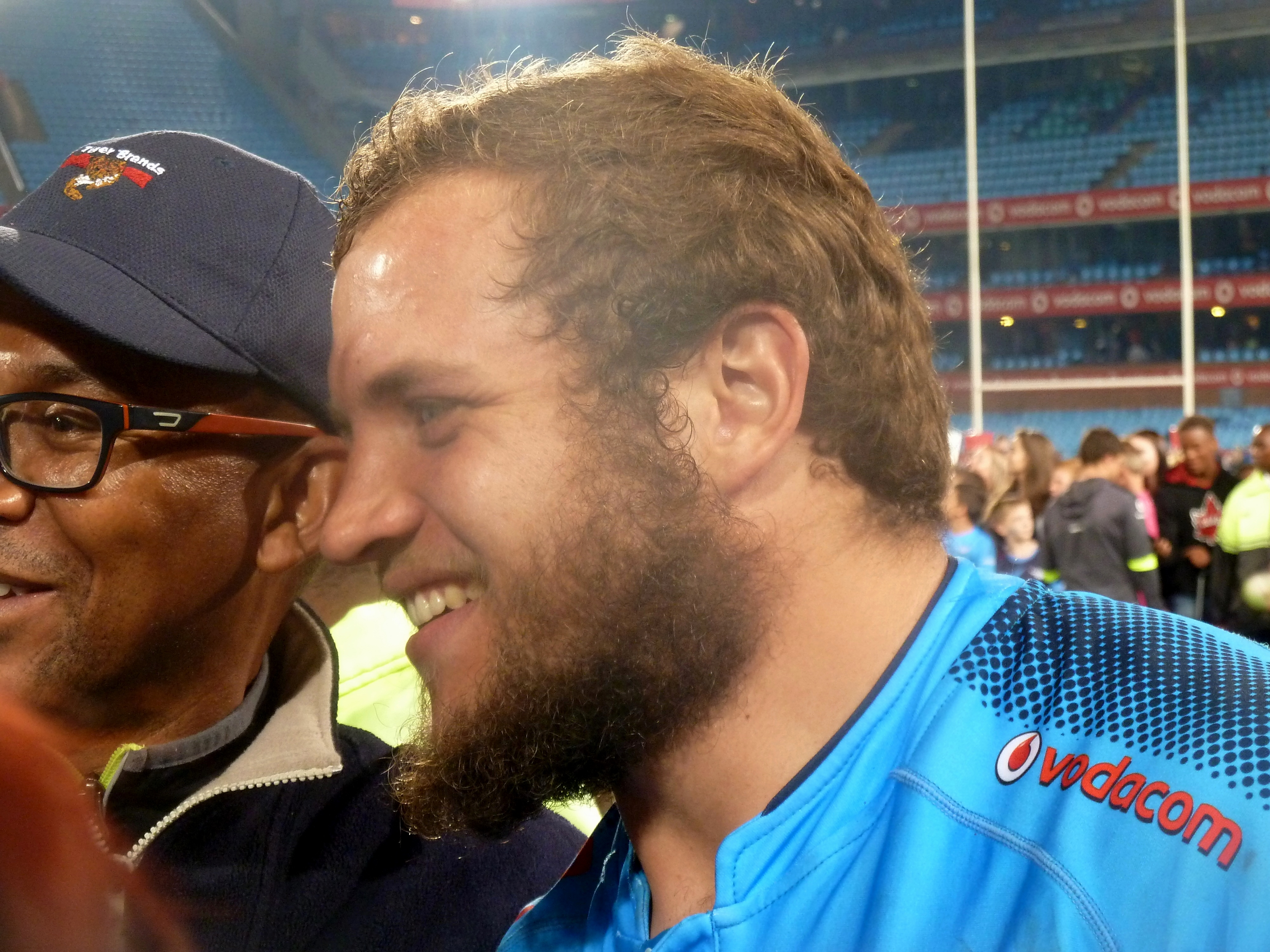
- Schoeman representing the Bulls during Super Rugby
- Born: 7 May 1994 (age 32) Nelspruit, South Africa
- Height: 1.80 m (5 ft 11 in)
- Weight: 118 kg (260 lb; 18 st 8 lb)
- School: Afrikaanse Hoër Seunskool
- University: University of Pretoria

Rugby union career
- Position: Loosehead Prop
- Current team: Edinburgh
Senior career
Years	Team	Apps	(Points)
2014–2017	Blue Bulls	26	(10)
2016–2018	Bulls	35	(20)
2017–2018	Blue Bulls XV	2	(5)
2018–	Edinburgh	126	(75)
- Correct as of 23 June 2025
International career
Years	Team	Apps	(Points)
2011–2012	South Africa U18	4	(0)
2014	South Africa U20	5	(5)
2021–	Scotland	54	(45)
2022	Scotland 'A'	1	(0)
2025	British & Irish Lions	0	(0)
- Correct as of 18 November 2026

Pierre Schoeman (born 7 May 1994) is a professional rugby union player who plays as a prop for United Rugby Championship club Edinburgh. Born in South Africa, he represents Scotland at international level after qualifying on residency grounds.

== Professional career ==
=== Youth ===
As a scholar at Afrikaanse Hoër Seunskool in Pretoria, Schoeman represented the Blue Bulls at various youth tournaments. He played for them at the Under-16 Grant Khomo Week in 2010 and at the 2011 and 2012 Under-18 Craven Week tournaments.

Schoeman then represented the Blue Bulls U19 side in the 2012 and 2013 Under-19 Provincial Championships.

=== Club ===
Schoeman made his first class debut during the 2014 Vodacom Cup competition. He started in the Blue Bulls' 24–26 defeat to eventual champions Griquas. He remained in the starting line-up for their next match in the competition against the Pumas.

In April 2018, it was announced that Schoeman would join Scottish Pro14 club Edinburgh prior to the 2018–19 Pro14 on a three-year contract. In December 2019, Pierre won the Outstanding Man of the Match performance with rivals Glasgow Warriors in the second leg of the prestigious 1872 Cup, this brought the score to one victory each leaving it all to play for in May 2020.

=== International ===
His performances in the Craven Week competition in South Africa led to his inclusion in the South African Schools side in 2011, playing one match against France. He was once again selected in the South African Schools side in 2012. He played in (and captained) the side in their matches against France and Wales and played off the bench in their match against England.

In 2014, he was selected in the South Africa Under-20 side for the 2014 IRB Junior World Championship in New Zealand. He was the first points scorer for his side at the tournament, getting an 18th-minute try to help the side to a victory over Scotland.

In October 2021, he was named as part of the Scotland training squad for the Autumn nations series, having qualified to play for Scotland through residency. He was subsequently selected for the 42 player full squad for the series. He was selected to start versus Tonga in the match scheduled for 29 October 2021.

He made his Scotland debut against Tonga on 30 October 2021. Scotland won the match 60-14, with Schoeman scoring a try.

He played in all five games during the 2022 Six Nations Championship, scoring a try in the final match against Ireland.

In 2023, Schoeman was selected in the 33 player squad for the 2023 Rugby World Cup in France.

=== British and Irish Lions ===
In May 2025, Schoeman was selected by Head Coach Andy Farrell for the 2025 British & Irish Lions tour to Australia. He made his Lions debut during the first warm-up match, a 24-28 defeat to Argentina in Dublin, on 20 June 2025, becoming Lion #868.
