= Ryno Pieterse =

South African rugby union player

- Full name: Ryno Pieterse
- Born: 6 August 1998 (age 28) Witbank, South Africa
- Height: 1.96 m (6 ft 5 in)
- Weight: 114 kg (251 lb)
- Notable relative: Bobby van Jaarsveld. Karlien van Jaarsveld

Rugby union career
- Position(s): Lock, Flanker, Number 8
- Current team: Kintetsu Liners
Senior career
Years	Team	Apps	(Points)
2020	Bulls	3	(0)
2020–2025	Castres	10	(15)
2025–	Kintetsu Liners	10	(25)
- Correct as of 13 February 2021

Ryno Pieterse (born 6 August 1998) is a South African rugby union player for Castres in Top 14. His regular position is lock.

He made his Super Rugby debut while for the Bulls in their round 1 match against the Sharks in January 2020, coming on as a replacement lock. He signed for the Bulls Super Rugby side for the 2020 Super Rugby season.
