= Nick de Jager =

South African rugby union player

- Full name: Nicholas John Konrad de Jager
- Born: 7 February 1990 (age 36) Johannesburg, South Africa
- Height: 1.93 m (6 ft 4 in)
- Weight: 112 kg (17 st 9 lb; 247 lb)
- School: St. John's College, Johannesburg
- University: Stellenbosch University

Rugby union career
- Position: Flanker
- Current team: Bulls / Blue Bulls XV
Amateur team(s)
Years	Team	Apps	(Points)
2012–2013	Maties	8	(0)
2014	Old Albanian	2	(0)
Senior career
Years	Team	Apps	(Points)
2014–2015	Saracens	10	(15)
2015–2018	Blue Bulls	23	(15)
2016–present	Blue Bulls XV	12	(5)
2016–present	Bulls	29	(20)
2018–2019	Toyota Industries Shuttles	5	(5)
- Correct as of 11 July 2019

Nicholas John Konrad de Jager (born 7 February 1990) is a South African professional rugby union player. He plays at flanker for the Bulls in Super Rugby and the Blue Bulls XV in the Rugby Challenge.

== Career ==
=== Maties ===
De Jager played Varsity Cup rugby with Stellenbosch-based university side Maties in 2012 and 2013. In 2012, he made six appearances during the competition to help Maties all the way to the final. He also featured in the final, coming on as a late replacement, but could not prevent his side losing 21–29 to UP Tuks in Pretoria. He made three appearances in the round-robin stage of the 2013 Varsity Cup, which again saw Maties lose to UP Tuks in the final.

=== Saracens ===
He then moved to English Premiership side Saracens in late 2013. He was included in their squad for the 2013–14 LV Cup and made two appearances for the side. His first class debut came in their 41–8 victory over the Newcastle Falcons, where he was named Man of the Match. He made a further two appearances in the competition, a 16–20 defeat to Northampton Saints in the last round of the pool stages and a 7–26 defeat to the same opposition in their quarter-final clash.

He made a further six appearances in the 2014–15 LV Cup. He scored his first career try in their final pool stage match against the Exeter Chiefs, one of two tries he scored in the match to help Saracens to a 35–18 victory. He also scored a try in the final of the competition – again against the Exeter Chiefs – to help Saracens win the trophy for the first time since 1998.

He made a solitary appearance for Saracens in the 2014–15 English Premiership (rugby union), playing the first 48 minutes of their match against the Newcastle Falcons.

He also played two matches for Old Albanian during the 2014–15 National League 1.

=== Blue Bulls ===
He returned to South Africa in August 2015 to join up with the Blue Bulls prior to the 2015 Currie Cup Premier Division. He signed a one-year contract with the Pretoria-based side.
