= Ramone Samuels =

South African rugby union player

- Full name: Ramone Christie Samuels
- Born: 3 November 1994 (age 32) Somerset West, South Africa
- Height: 1.83 m (6 ft 0 in)
- Weight: 105 kg (231 lb; 16 st 7 lb)
- School: Paul Roos Gymnasium, Stellenbosch
- Notable relative: Damian Willemse (brother)

Rugby union career
- Position: Flanker / Number eight / Hooker
- Current team: Stormers / Western Province
Youth career
- 2010–2013: Western Province
- 2014–2015: Golden Lions
Amateur team(s)
| Years | Team | Apps | (Points) |
| 2014 | UJ | 0 | (0) |
Senior career
| Years | Team | Apps | (Points) |
| 2015–2016 | Golden Lions XV | 18 | (25) |
| 2016 | Lions | 3 | (0) |
| 2016 | Golden Lions | 3 | (0) |
| 2017-18 | Stormers | 32 | (15) |
| 2017–19 | Western Province | 13 | (10) |
- Correct as of 13 July 2018
International career
| Years | Team | Apps | (Points) |
| 2012 | South Africa Schools | 0 | (0) |
| 2017 | South Africa 'A' | 2 | (0) |
- Correct as of 24 May 2018

Ramone Christie Samuels (born 3 November 1994 in Somerset West, South Africa) is a South African rugby union player for the Stormers in Super Rugby and Western Province in the Currie Cup. He can play as a flanker, number eight or hooker.

== Rugby career ==
=== Youth rugby / Western Province ===
Samuels attended Paul Roos Gymnasium in Stellenbosch and a he earned a provincial call-up to represent Western Province at the 2010 Under-16 Grant Khomo Week in Upington, scoring a try in their 28–7 victory over the Golden Lions

He also represented Western Province at the premier South African high schools competition, the Under-18 Craven Week, on two occasions – at the 2011 tournament in Kimberley and the 2012 tournament in Port Elizabeth. He scored a try in their 2012 match against the SWD Eagles and was also included in the South Africa Schools squad after the competition, although he didn't feature in any of their three matches during the Under-18 International Series.

He joined the Western Province Rugby Institute after high school and played for Western Province U19 in the 2013 Under-19 Provincial Championship. He played in eleven of their twelve matches during the competition, initially playing as a hooker, but starting their final six matches as an eighth man. He scored a try in their match against Sharks U19, two tries in their 45–36 win over Leopards U19 and a fourth for the season in a victory over Border U19, but his side had a poor season, finishing in fifth position and failing to qualify for the semi-finals, despite being the defending champions.

=== Golden Lions ===
Prior to the 2014 season, Samuels moved to Johannesburg to join the Golden Lions. He was named in their squad for the 2014 Vodacom Cup, but didn't make any appearances in the competition. He did feature in nine matches for the Golden Lions U19 side in the 2014 Under-21 Provincial Championship in the second half of the season though, scoring a try in a 113–3 victory over Border U19 to help them finish in third spot on the log. He played off the bench in their semi-final match against trans-Jukskei rivals Blue Bulls U19, but could not prevent the side from Pretoria winning 23–19 to eliminate Samuels' side from the competition.

He got his first taste of first class rugby in 2015, when he represented the Golden Lions XV in the 2015 Vodacom Cup competition. He made his debut by playing off the bench in a 53–3 victory over the Welwitschias in Windhoek, his first of nine appearances as a reserve in the competition. In his sixth match – against the Leopards in Johannesburg, he scored his first try in first class rugby, scoring within seconds of appearing from the bench to help his side to a 63–10 victory. Despite being named in the Golden Lions' senior squad for the 2015 Currie Cup Premier Division, he reverted to the Under-21 squad, where he started nine of their matches in Group A of the 2014 Under-21 Provincial Championship and came on as a replacement in one more match. He scored a try in each of their matches against Eastern Province U21 – helping them secure a 73–14 win in Port Elizabeth and a 40–24 win in Johannesburg – as the golden Lions finished in fourth place to secure the final semi-final berth. Samuels ended on the losing side in the semi-finals of the competition for the second season in a row as Western Province U21 won 43–20 in Cape Town.

In 2016, Samuels was included in the Golden Lions XV squad for the 2016 Currie Cup qualification series. He made his first ever first class start in their first opening match of the competition, a 23–27 defeat to the Border Bulldogs and also started in a their match against the Welwitschias in Windhoek a week later, scoring a try in a 66–12 win. He was then called up to the Lions Super Rugby squad and named on the bench for their match against the Southern Kings in Round Nine of the 2016 Super Rugby season. He made his Super Rugby debut by coming on as a replacement for Akker van der Merwe in the 63rd minute of the match.

=== Stormers / Western Province ===
At the start of 2017, Samuels moved to Cape Town, where he joined the Stormers Super Rugby team and the Western Province Currie Cup team.

== Personal life ==
Samuels is the older brother of Damian Willemse, also a professional rugby union player (Samuels' birth was registered under his mother's maiden name). Both brothers were members of the Western Province squad that won the 2017 Currie Cup Premier Division.
