= Michal Haznar =

Poland international rugby union player

Michał Haznar
- Full name: Michał Lukasz Haznar
- Born: 17 January 1994 (age 32) Windhoek, Namibia
- Height: 1.85 m (6 ft 1 in)
- Weight: 95 kg (209 lb; 14 st 13 lb)
- School: Paul Roos Gymnasium, Stellenbosch
- University: University of Johannesburg

Rugby union career
- Position: Centre
- Current team: Stormers / Griquas
Youth career
- 2010–2013: Western Province
- 2014–2015: Golden Lions
Senior career
Years	Team	Apps	(Points)
2015	Golden Lions XV	1	(0)
2017–2018	Western Province	14	(20)
2019	Griquas	12	(10)
2020–	Stormers	2	(0)
2020	Western Province	1	(0)
2021	→ Griquas	0	(0)
2021	Griquas	1	(0)
- Correct as of 27 December 2021
International career
Years	Team	Apps	(Points)
2021–present	Poland	1	

Michal Lukasz Haznar (born 17 January 1994) is a Namibian-born rugby union Polish player for Griquas in the Currie Cup and the Rugby Challenge. His regular position is centre.

His debut with the Polish team was against Germany in November 2021.
