= Nqoba Mxoli =

South African rugby union player

- Full name: Nqobisizwe Minentle Mxoli
- Born: 2 February 1994 (age 32) Durban, South Africa
- Height: 1.84 m (6 ft 1/2 in)
- Weight: 112 kg (17 st 9 lb; 247 lb)
- School: Westville Boys' High School
- University: University of Pretoria

Rugby union career
- Position: Prop
- Current team: Cheetahs / Free State Cheetahs
Youth career
- 2013–2015: Blue Bulls
Amateur team(s)
Years	Team	Apps	(Points)
2015	UP Tuks	8	(10)
Senior career
Years	Team	Apps	(Points)
2014–2016	Blue Bulls	14	(15)
2016–2018	Bulls	5	(0)
2018–2019	Blue Bulls XV	7	(10)
2019–2021	Griquas	26	(5)
2021–	Cheetahs		
2022–	Free State Cheetahs	0	(0)
2022	→ Griffons	8	(0)
- Correct as of 10 July 2022
International career
Years	Team	Apps	(Points)
2014	South Africa Under-20	0	(0)
- Correct as of 6 August 2015

Nqobisizwe Minentle 'Mox' Mxoli (born 2 February 1994) is a South African rugby union professional player for Griquas in the Currie Cup. His regular position is prop.

== Rugby career ==
=== Schoolboy rugby ===
Mxoli was born in Durban and went to Westville Boys' High School, but wasn't selected to represent KwaZulu-Natal in any school-level rugby union competitions.

=== Blue Bulls ===
After finishing school, Mxoli moved to Pretoria to join the Blue Bulls Academy. He made seven appearances for the Blue Bulls U19s in the 2013 Under-19 Provincial Championship, scoring one try in their 56–7 victory over Border U19 to help them finish top of the log after winning all twelve of their matches. They eventually won the competition, beating the Golden Lions U19 35–23 in the final, but Nxoli didn't feature for them in the play-off stages.

In 2014, Mxoli was named in the Blue Bulls squad for the 2014 Vodacom Cup competition and made his first class debut in their 20–22 defeat to the Pumas, coming on as a replacement mid-way through the second half. That was his only appearance in the competition and he linked up with the South Africa Under-20 squad as they prepared for the 2014 IRB Junior World Championship in New Zealand. He was not named in the matchday squads for their first two pool stage matches against Scotland and New Zealand, but was included on the bench for their third match against Samoa. However, he failed to get any game time in the match as South Africa won 21–8 to qualify for the semi-finals. He was again not named in their squad that beat New Zealand in the semi-final or the squad that lost 20–21 to England in the final, therefore failing to play a single minute in the tournament.

Upon his return to domestic action, he played five times for the Blue Bulls U21s in the round-robin stages of the 2014 Under-21 Provincial Championship. He scored a brace against Border U21 in a 123–7 victory to help the Blue Bulls qualify for the semi-finals, but didn't feature in the play-offs, as the Blue Bulls won the tournament, beating Western Province U21 20–10 in the final.

At the start of 2015, Mxoli represented university side UP Tuks in the 2015 Varsity Cup. He featured in all eight of their matches - scoring tries against both Western Cape sides, the UCT Ikey Tigers and Maties – as they finished top of the log before suffering a 28–29 semi-final defeat to NWU Pukke. After the tournament, he was named as a replacement prop in a Varsity Cup Dream Team that played a match against the 2015 South African Under-20 squad, with the latter winning the match 31–24.

Mxoli then made his first start in a first class match in the Blue Bulls' 2015 Vodacom Cup match against their affiliated sub-union, the Limpopo Blue Bulls. Mxoli took just 4 minutes to score his first senior try in the match to help the Blue Bulls to an 83–13 victory. He was named in the Blue Bulls' Currie Cup side for the first time prior to the 2015 Currie Cup Premier Division and he was named on the bench for their opening match of the competition against the Free State Cheetahs, coming on as a replacement in the 62nd minute of a 57–19 victory for the Blue Bulls. He then reverted to the Blue Bulls U21 side, making seven starts for them during the 2015 Under-21 Provincial Championship Group A and scoring tries in their matches against the Leopards and Western Province.

In 2016, Mxoli was included in the Blue Bulls squad for the 2016 Currie Cup qualification series. He started ten of his team's fourteen matches in the series and scored tries in a 16–30 defeat to Western Province and a 42–15 victory over the Falcons. He was also included in the Bulls squad for the 2016 Super Rugby season and he made his debut on 9 July 2016, coming on for the final eight minutes of their match against the Sunwolves and also appeared for the same amount of time in their next match, a 43–17 victory over the Cheetahs in Bloemfontein.

In July 2016, the Blue Bulls confirmed that Mxoli failed a drugs test, after a dietary supplement that he used was found to contain a banned substance.
