= Simphiwe Matanzima =

South African rugby union player

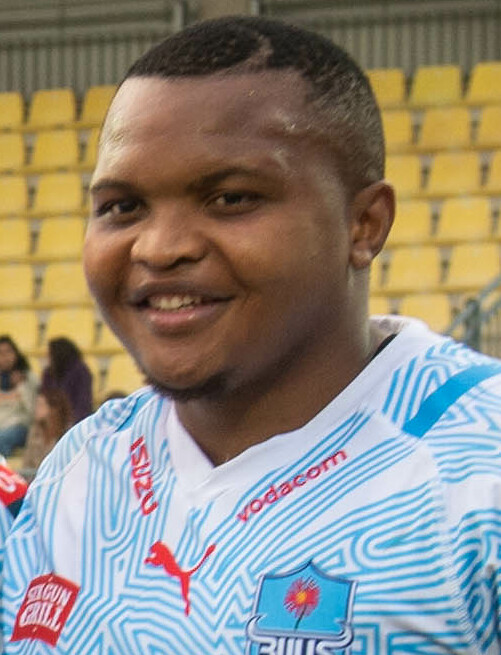
- Born: 18 August 1997 (age 29) Komani, South Africa
- Height: 1.82 m (5 ft 11 1/2 in)
- Weight: 111 kg (245 lb)
- School: Queen's College

Rugby union career
- Position: Prop
- Current team: Bulls / Blue Bulls
Youth career
- 2014: Border Bulldogs
- 2016–2018: Blue Bulls
Senior career
Years	Team	Apps	(Points)
2018	Blue Bulls XV	1	(0)
2019–2026	Bulls	37	(15)
2019–2026	Blue Bulls	18	(10)
2026-present	Sharks	0	(0)
- Correct as of 23 July 2022

Simphiwe Matanzima (born 18 August 1997) is a South African rugby union player for the Sharks in the United Rugby Championship, and the Sharks in the Currie Cup. His regular position is loosehead prop.

Matanzima made his Super Rugby debut for the Bulls in February 2019, coming on as a replacement in his side's 40–3 victory over the Stormers.

== Honours ==
- Currie Cup winner 2021
- United Rugby Championship runner-up 2021-22
