= 2018 Under-21 Provincial Championship =

2018 rugby union competition

- Countries: South Africa
- Date: 25 August – 27 October 2018
- Champions: Golden Lions U21
- Runners-up: Blue Bulls U21
- Matches played: 24
- Tries scored: 278 (average 11.6 per match)
- Top point scorer: Lubabalo Dobela, Free State U21 (101)
- Top try scorer: Courtney Winnaar, Sharks U21 (8)

The 2018 Under-21 Provincial Championship was the 2018 edition of the Under-21 Provincial Championship, an annual national Under-21 rugby union competition held in South Africa, and was contested from 25 August to 27 October 2018.

The competition was won by Golden Lions U21, who beat Blue Bulls U21 58–24 in the final played on 27 October 2018.

== Competition rules and information ==
There was seven participating teams in the 2018 Under-21 Provincial Championship. They played each other once during the pool stage, either at home or away. Teams receive four points for a win and two points for a draw. Bonus points were awarded to teams that scored four or more tries in a game, as well as to teams that lost a match by seven points or less. Teams were ranked by log points, then points difference (points scored less points conceded).

The top four teams in the pool stage qualified for the semifinals, which were followed by a final.

== Teams ==
The teams that played in the 2018 Under-21 Provincial Championship are:

Location of teams in the 2018 Under-21 Provincial Championship

2018 Under-21 Provincial Championship teams
Team name	Stadium
Blue Bulls U21	Loftus Versfeld, Pretoria
Eastern Province U21	Nelson Mandela Bay Stadium, Port Elizabeth
Free State U21	Free State Stadium, Bloemfontein
Golden Lions U21	Ellis Park Stadium, Johannesburg
Leopards U21	Fanie du Toit Sport Ground, Potchefstroom
Sharks U21	Kings Park Stadium, Durban
Western Province U21	Newlands Stadium, Cape Town

== Pool stage ==
=== Standings ===
2018 Under-21 Provincial Championship log
Pos	Team	P	W	D	L	PF	PA	PD	TF	TA	TB	LB	Pts
1	Golden Lions U21	6	5	0	1	284	99	+185	38	13	4	1	25
2	Western Province U21	6	5	0	1	381	127	+254	55	18	3	0	23
3	Blue Bulls U21	6	4	0	2	329	144	+185	50	17	5	2	23
4	Free State U21	6	3	0	3	256	182	+74	38	23	5	1	18
5	Sharks U21	6	3	0	3	281	166	+115	40	23	4	1	17
6	Leopards U21	6	1	0	5	154	328	−174	23	50	1	0	5
7	Eastern Province U21	6	0	0	6	56	695	−639	7	107	1	0	1
Final standings.

Legend and competition rules
Legend:
Qualified for the semifinals.	P = Games played, W = Games won, D = Games drawn, L = Games lost, PF = Points for, PA = Points against, PD = Points difference, TF = Tries for, TA = Tries against, TB = Try bonus points, LB = Losing bonus points, Pts = Log points
Competition rules:
Qualification: The top four teams qualified for the semifinals. Points breakdown: * 4 points for a win * 2 points for a draw * 1 bonus point for a loss by seven points or less * 1 bonus point for scoring four or more tries in a match

=== Matches ===
==== Round one ====
24 August 2018	Eastern Province U21	0–120	Golden Lions U21	WJ de Wet Stadium, Despatch
14:00		Scoreboard	Try: Ruan Vermaak (2); MJ Pelser; Bradley Thain (3); Eddie Fouché (3); Wayne van der Bank; Seun Maduna; Gianni Lombard (2); Nathan McBeth; Justin Brandon; Morné van den Berg; Madosh Tambwe; Tatenda Mujawo; Con: Eddie Fouché; Gianni Lombard (13); Jeanluc Cilliers	Referee: Rodney Boneparte

24 August 2018	Blue Bulls U21	26–30	Western Province U21	Loftus Versfeld B, Pretoria
15:00	Try: JC Pretorius (2); Josh Allderman; Erich Cronjé; Con: Earll Douwrie (2); Cameron Hufke	Scoreboard	Try: Jordan Chait; Marco Labuschagné; Nico Leonard; Con: Jondre Williams (3); Pen: Jondre Williams (3)	Referee: Jaco Pretorius

25 August 2018	Leopards U21	12–64	Free State U21	Fanie du Toit Sport Ground, Potchefstroom
12:30	Try: Dougie Bruce-Smith; Janlu Steenkamp; Con: Janlu Steenkamp	Scoreboard	Try: Marnus van der Merwe; Thembinkosi Mangwana; Lubabalo Dobela (2); Francois Agenbach; Kurt Eybers; Marthinus Boshoff; Darren Adonis (2); Olie Losaba; Con: Lubabalo Dobela (7)	Referee: Stephan Geldenhuys

Bye/s: Sharks U21

==== Round two ====
31 August 2018	Golden Lions U21	38–14	Leopards U21	Ellis Park Stadium, Johannesburg
14:00	Try: HP van Schoor; Manuel Rass; Tyrone Green; Gianni Lombard; Tiaan van der Merwe; Con: Gianni Lombard (5); Pen: Gianni Lombard	Scoreboard	Try: Damon Lee; Pienaar van Niekerk; Con: Janlu Steenkamp (2)	Referee: Graham Cooper

1 September 2018	Sharks U21	99–7	Eastern Province U21	Kings Park Stadium, Durban
13:00	Try: Jordan Els (2); Franco Botha; Jacques Ackerman (2); Marco Palvie; Ilunga Mukendi; Mfundo Ndhlovu (3); Matt Wiseman; Sicelo Tole (2); Chuiner van Rooyen (2); Con: Gareth Simpson (6); James Tedder (6)	Scoreboard	Try: Dawayne Nel; Con: Wayven Jafta	Referee: Sindile Ngcese

1 September 2018	Free State U21	19–36	Blue Bulls U21	Free State Stadium, Bloemfontein
11:45	Try: Marthinus Boshoff; Ruan Henning; Rewan Kruger; Con: Lubabalo Dobela (2)	Scoreboard	Try: Johan Grobbelaar (2); Andell Loubser; Richman Gora; Josh Allderman; Con: Earll Douwrie; Cliven Loubser (3); Pen: Mornay Smith	Referee: Divan Uys

Bye/s: Western Province U21

==== Round three ====
7 September 2018	Blue Bulls U21	20–27	Golden Lions U21	Loftus Versfeld B, Pretoria
15:00	Try: Johan Grobbelaar; Dewald Maritz; Con: Cliven Loubser; Theo Boshoff; Pen: Cliven Loubser (2)	Scoreboard	Try: Tyrone Green; Wayne van der Bank; Jan-Louis la Grange; Con: Gianni Lombard (3); Pen: Gianni Lombard (2)	Referee: Ruhan Meiring

8 September 2018	Leopards U21	21–69	Sharks U21	Fanie du Toit Sport Ground, Potchefstroom
12:30	Try: André van der Berg; Keagan Tait; Sampie Swiegers; Con: Janlu Steenkamp (3)	Scoreboard	Try: Franco Botha; Dylan Weideman; Jacques Ackerman; Courtney Winnaar (3); Ilunga Mukendi (2); Mfundo Ndhlovu (2); Con: James Tedder (8); Pen: James Tedder	Referee: Phumzile Mbewu

8 September 2018	Western Province U21	30–27	Free State U21	City Park Stadium, Athlone
15:00	Try: Zain Davids; Dan Jooste; Tristan Leyds; Con: Jondre Williams (3); Pen: Jondre Williams; Jordan Chait (2)	Scoreboard	Try: Ruben Cross; Janco Cloete; Rewan Kruger; Francois Agenbach; Con: Lubabalo Dobela (2); Pen: Lubabalo Dobela	Referee: Vusi Msibi

Bye/s: Eastern Province U21

==== Round four ====
15 September 2018	Golden Lions U21	41–13	Western Province U21	Ellis Park Stadium, Johannesburg
12:30	Try: Vincent Tshituka; Tyrone Green; Wayne van der Bank (2); PJ Botha; Con: Jeanluc Cilliers (5); Pen: Jeanluc Cilliers (2)	Scoreboard	Try: Nama Xaba; Sihle Njezula; Pen: Jondre Williams	Referee: Stephan Geldenhuys

15 September 2018	Sharks U21	31–38	Blue Bulls U21	Kings Park Stadium, Durban
15:00	Try: Jordan Els; Courtney Winnaar; Mfundo Ndhlovu; Chuiner van Rooyen; Con: James Tedder (4); Pen: James Tedder	Scoreboard	Try: Johan Grobbelaar (4); Theo Boshoff; Earll Douwrie; Con: Andell Loubser (4)	Referee: Paul Mente

15 September 2018	Eastern Province U21	7–69	Leopards U21	WJ de Wet Stadium, Despatch
15:00	Try: Dawayne Nel; Con: Jeandre van Ghent	Scoreboard	Try: Lincoln Daniels (2); Gerik Mynhardt; Lyon Mkize; Ruben Dreyer; Franco Tiedt; Pienaar van Niekerk; Keagan Tait (3); Wihan von Wielligh; Con: Janlu Steenkamp (6); André van der Berg	Referee: Ruhan Meiring

Bye/s: Free State U21

==== Round five ====
19 September 2018	Blue Bulls U21	149–13	Eastern Province U21	Loftus Versfeld B, Pretoria
14:00	Try: Werner Fourie; Denver Prins; Rieckert Korff (3); Thomas Meyer; Ewart Potgieter; Dylan van der Walt; Ginter Smuts (3); Irvin Ali; Erich Cronjé (2); Xolisa Guma (3); Aaron Brody; Cliven Loubser; Alulutho Tshakweni; Mihlali Stamper (2); Ciaran Dayaram; Con: Erich Cronjé; Andell Loubser (14); Cliven Loubser; Marco Fuhri	Scoreboard	Try: penalty try Pen: Jeandre van Ghent (2)	Referee: Sindile Ngcese

21 September 2018	Free State U21	33–31	Golden Lions U21	Free State Stadium, Bloemfontein
15:00	Try: Rewan Kruger; Lubabalo Dobela; Kurt Eybers; Marthinus Boshoff; Con: Lubabalo Dobela (2); Pen: Lubabalo Dobela (3)	Scoreboard	Try: Darrien Landsberg; Eddie Fouché; Tyrone Green; Jeanluc Cilliers; Con: Jeanluc Cilliers (4); Pen: Jeanluc Cilliers	Referee: Christopher Allison

22 September 2018	Western Province U21	45–19	Sharks U21	Newlands Stadium, Cape Town
17:00	Try: Dan Jooste (2); Jondre Williams; Sihle Njezula (2); Schalk Erasmus; Con: Jondre Williams (4); Joshua Vermeulen (2); Pen: Jondre Williams	Scoreboard	Try: Jordan Els; Courtney Winnaar (2); Con: James Tedder (2)	Referee: Ruhan Meiring

Bye/s: Leopards U21

==== Round six ====
28 September 2018	Eastern Province U21	0–173	Western Province U21	WJ de Wet Stadium, Despatch
14:00		Scoreboard	Try: Schalk Erasmus; Gift Dlamini (3); Muller Uys (5); Labib Kannemeyer; Abner van Reenen; Tumi Mogoje (5); Lubelo Scott (2); Mujaahid van der Hoven (2); Sako Makata (2); Lee-Marvin Mazibuko; Ricardo James Duarttee; Sybrand Lombaard (2); Ryan Gregory Muller; Con: Joshua Vermeulen (19)	Referee: Stephan Geldenhuys

28 September 2018	Sharks U21	44–28	Free State U21	Kings Park Stadium, Durban
15:00	Try: Jordan Els; Courtney Winnaar; Ilunga Mukendi; James Tedder; Mfundo Ndhlovu; Con: James Tedder (5); Pen: James Tedder (3)	Scoreboard	Try: Marnus van der Merwe; Sango Xamlashe; Marthinus Boshoff; Ruben Cross; Con: Lubabalo Dobela (4)	Referee: Vusi Msibi

29 September 2018	Leopards U21	24–60	Blue Bulls U21	Fanie du Toit Sport Ground, Potchefstroom
15:30	Try: Jeandre Hendrik Leonard; Coenie Kruger; Lincoln Daniels; Con: Janlu Steenkamp (3); Pen: Janlu Steenkamp	Scoreboard	Try: Rieckert Korff; Ewan Coetzee; JC Pretorius; Xolisa Guma; Stedman Gans (2); Earll Douwrie; Ginter Smuts; Cliven Loubser; Erich Cronjé; Con: Theo Boshoff (2); Andell Loubser (2); Cliven Loubser	Referee: Jaco Pretorius

Bye/s: Golden Lions U21

==== Round seven ====
5 October 2018	Golden Lions U21	27–19	Sharks U21	Ellis Park Stadium, Johannesburg
15:00	Try: Ruan Vermaak; Bradley Thain; Ngwekazi Khanya Ncusane; Con: Jeanluc Cilliers (3); Pen: Jeanluc Cilliers (2)	Scoreboard	Try: Jordan Els; Courtney Winnaar; Gert Cronjé; Con: James Tedder (2)	Referee: Ruhan Meiring

6 October 2018	Western Province U21	90–14	Leopards U21	City Park Stadium, Athlone
11:30	Try: Dan Jooste (2); Nama Xaba; Zain Davids; Lyle Hendricks; Cornel Smit; Nico Leonard; Marco Labuschagné (2); Wikus Groenewald; Labib Kannemeyer (3); Mujaahid van der Hoven; Con: Jondre Williams (4); Sybrand Lombaard (5); Lyle Hendricks	Scoreboard	Try: Jeandre Hendrik Leonard; Michiel Bosman; Con: Janlu Steenkamp (2)	Referee: Paul Mente

6 October 2018	Free State U21	85–29	Eastern Province U21	CUT Stadium, Bloemfontein
14:00	Try: Janco Cloete; Bertie de Bod; Zinedine Booysen; Francois Agenbach; William Eybers (2); Kurt Eybers; Marthinus Boshoff; Craig Ellis; Lubabalo Dobela (4); Con: Kwagga Taylor (6); Lubabalo Dobela (4)	Scoreboard	Try: Jerome Lottering; Cameron Cato; Wayne Moss; Malan Marais; Con: Wayne Moss (3); Pen: Wayne Moss	Referee: Archie Sehlako

Bye/s: Blue Bulls U21

== Title play-offs ==
=== Semifinals ===
19 October 2018	Golden Lions U21	55–30	Free State U21	Ellis Park Stadium, Johannesburg
15:00	Try: HP van Schoor; Cohen Kiewit; Gianni Lombard; Tyrone Green; Jan-Louis la Grange (3); PJ Botha; Con: Gianni Lombard (3); Pen: Gianni Lombard (3)	Scoreboard	Try: Bertie de Bod; Sango Xamlashe; Kurt Eybers; Con: Lubabalo Dobela (3); Pen: Lubabalo Dobela (2); Drop: Kwagga Taylor	Referee: Stephan Geldenhuys

20 October 2018	Western Province U21	20–29	Blue Bulls U21	Newlands Stadium, Cape Town
14:00	Try: Muller Uys penalty try Con: Jondre Williams; Pen: Jondre Williams (2)	Scoreboard	Try: Mornay Smith; Stedman Gans; Earll Douwrie; Lian du Toit; Erich Cronjé; Con: Earll Douwrie; Cameron Hufke	Referee: Paul Mente

=== Final ===
27 October 2018	Blue Bulls U21	24–58	Golden Lions U21	Newlands Stadium, Cape Town
13:00	Try: Jaco Bezuidenhout; JC Pretorius; Manie Libbok; Con: Manie Libbok (3); Pen: Cameron Hufke	Scoreboard	Try: Len Massyn; Gianni Lombard; Tyrone Green; Wandisile Simelane; Shaun Williams; Asenathi Ntlabakanye; Con: Jeanluc Cilliers (5); Pen: Jeanluc Cilliers (6)	Referee: Ben Crouse

== Honours ==
The honour roll for the 2018 Under-21 Provincial Championship was as follows:

2018 Under-21 Provincial Championship
Champions:	Golden Lions U21
Top points scorer:	Lubabalo Dobela, Free State U21 (101)
Top try scorer:	Courtney Winnaar, Sharks U21 (8)

== Players ==
The following squads were named for the 2018 Under-21 Provincial Championship:

Blue Bulls U21 squad
Irvin Ali • Josh Allderman • Heino Bezuidenhout • Jaco Bezuidenhout • Theo Boshoff • Jerome Bossr • Aaron Brody • Ewan Coetzee • Erich Cronjé • Ciaran Dayaram • Earll Douwrie • Lian du Toit • Cabous Eloff • Werner Fourie • Marco Fuhri • Stedman Gans • Prince ǃGaoseb • Richman Gora • Johan Grobbelaar • Xolisa Guma • Boeta Hamman • Cameron Hufke • Rieckert Korff • Manie Libbok • Andell Loubser • Cliven Loubser • Khwezi Mafu • Dewald Maritz • Simphiwe Matanzima • Thomas Meyer • Tiny Mukhari • Ruan Nortjé • Ryno Pieterse • Ewart Potgieter • JC Pretorius • Denver Prins • Ig Prinsloo • Adré Smith • Mornay Smith • Ginter Smuts • Mihlali Stamper • Hendré Stassen • Alulutho Tshakweni • Dylan van der Walt • Wian van Niekerk

Eastern Province U21 squad
Dillon Barendse • Dominique Barendse • Sithembiso Befile • Tembekile Boltina • Ruan Botha • Cameron Cato • Chulu Chutu • Keenen Daniels • Siphosethu Dlongodlongo • Shaun Erasmus • Ntsika Fisanti • Aussie Fredericks • Stefan Gerber • Dylan Grootboom • Oyisa Hakhula • Vusikhaya Hanebe • Wayven Jafta • Shane January • Wickus Jason • Jason Jeggels • Damion Johannes • Siya Jwacu • Yomelela Keswa • WJ Kruger • Jerome Lottering • Khanyo Phiko Maqam • Malan Marais • Astin Morton • Wayne Moss • Mikale Muller • Siyabonga Mzantsi • Dawayne Nel • Ryan Oliphant • Marcus Plaatjies • Lindsay Potgieter • Chumani Poyana • Zayn Prins • Kyle Scott • Daiman Smith • Donavan Stevens • Louis Petrus Strydom • Rikus van As • Wimpie van der Walt • Jeandre van Ghent • Cameron van Heerden • Daniel Voigt

Free State U21 squad
Darren Adonis • Francois Agenbach • Gideo Beukes • Zinedine Booysen • Marthinus Boshoff • Janco Cloete • Ruben Cross • Luyolo Dapula • Bertie de Bod • Ruben de Haas • Cameron Douglas Dawson • Lubabalo Dobela • Craig Ellis • Kurt Eybers • William Eybers • Athi Halom • Ruan Henning • Nathan Jordan • Jan Kotze • Rewan Kruger • Olie Losaba • Elrigh Louw • Thembinkosi Mangwana• Thabiso Lindokuhle Msiza • Zwivhuya Mulaudzi • Keanen Murray • Mihlali Peter • Henk Pretorius • Sibabalo Qoma • Otsile Ranthako • Mervyn Roos • Jan George Rossouw • Bulelani Sali • Kwagga Taylor • Hannes Terblanche • Marnus van der Merwe • Gerbus van Wyk • Quintin Vorster • Sango Xamlashe

Golden Lions U21 squad
Niell Bezuidenhout • PJ Botha • Justin Brandon • Jeanluc Cilliers • Austin Davids • Hacjivah Dayimani • Tyreeq February • Chergin Fillies • Eddie Fouché • Tyrone Green • Jack Hart • Edwin Jansen • Darryle Kameel • Cohen Kiewit • Kayden Kiewit • Phillip Krause • Leo Kruger • Jan-Louis la Grange • Darrien Landsberg • Gianni Lombard • Phumzile Maqondwana • Nathan McBeth • Seun Maduna • Len Massyn • Tatenda Mujawo • Ngwekazi Khanya Ncusane • Cyprian Nkomo • Reinhard Nothnagel • Asenathi Ntlabakanye • MJ Pelser • Manuel Rass • Dian Schoonees • Wandisile Simelane • PJ Steenkamp • Madosh Tambwe • Bradley Thain • Vincent Tshituka • Morné van den Berg • Wayne van der Bank • Tiaan van der Merwe • HP van Schoor • Arno van Wyk • Ruan Vermaak • Shaun Williams

Leopards U21 squad
Rehann Baumann • Rouxbann Baumann • Michiel Bosman • Dougie Bruce-Smith • Rudie Burger • De Wet Castelyn • James Mao Cheia • Prins Cloete • Byron Coetzee • Shane Coetzee • Lincoln Daniels • Ebi Davids • Cami Dorfling • Ruben Dreyer • Reuben du Plooy • Andries Engelbrecht • Bernu Engelbrecht • Boet Heyl • Daine Kannemeyer • Tumi Khukhele • Coenie Kruger • Damon Lee • Jeandre Hendrik Leonard • Black Lion Lushozi • Stefanus Mare • Gerhardus Meyer • Lyon Mkize • Sibusiso Mlangeni • Mlondi Mnisi • Shima Mphahlele • Gerik Mynhardt • Sifis Ngobeni • Dihan Odendaal • Edmund Rheeder • Tiaan Schoonraad • Wapper Schoeman • Ruan Schultz • Hugo Slabber • Ishaad Snyman • Janlu Steenkamp • Johan Steyn • Brendan Strydom • Sampie Swiegers • Keagan Tait • Franco Tiedt • André van der Berg • Corné van der Merwe • Pienaar van Niekerk • Wihan von Wielligh • JP Wegner • Lifa Zulu

Sharks U21 squad
Jacques Ackerman • Curwin Bosch • Franco Botha • Heinrich Brendel • James Bruce • Austin Brummer • Zak Burger • Gert Cronjé • Edward Sipho Davids • Christiaan de Jager • Francois de Villiers • Kwanda Dimaza • Jordan Els • Andrew Evans • Aphelele Fassi • Keegan Haman • Marthinus Holtzhausen • Clifferd Jacobs • Khail Kotzenberg • Khutha Mchunu • Luyanda Mngadi • Ntuthuko Mthembu • Ilunga Mukendi • Sibabalwe Mzanywa • Mfundo Ndhlovu • Gugu Nelani • Sanele Nohamba • Cornelius Otto • Marco Palvie • Hendrik Prinsloo • Gareth Simpson • Jean-Pierre Smith • William Squires • Xavier Swartbooi • James Tedder • Sicelo Tole • JJ van der Mescht • Ruben van Heerden • Chuiner van Rooyen • Dylan Weideman • Courtney Winnaar • Matt Wiseman

Western Province U21 squad
Reece Bezuidenhout • Kwenzo Blose • David Brits • Jordan Chait • Matt Dahl • Zain Davids • Ruben de Villiers • Ben-Jason Dixon • Gift Dlamini • Ricardo James Duarttee • Schalk Erasmus • Wikus Groenewald • Lyle Hendricks • Jessie Johnson • Dan Jooste • Labib Kannemeyer • Marco Labuschagné • Nico Leonard • Tristan Leyds • Sybrand Lombaard • Leon Lyons • Athi Magwala • Sako Makata • Henlo Marais • Mike Mavovana • Lee-Marvin Mazibuko • David Meihuizen • Salmaan Moerat • Tumi Mogoje • Bronlee Mouries • Ryan Gregory Muller • Sihle Njezula • Prince Orderson • Joel Paarwater • Nico Peyper • Carlü Sadie • Sazi Sandi • Taigh Schoor • Lubelo Scott • Jordan Sesink-Clee • Cornel Smit • Pieter Swanepoel • Muller Uys • Mujaahid van der Hoven • Abner van Reenen • Ernst van Rhyn • Wian van Zyl • Joshua Vermeulen • Cobus Wiese • Jondre Williams • Nama Xaba

== Referees ==
The following referees officiated matches in the 2018 Under-21 Provincial Championship:

2018 Under-21 Provincial Championship referees
Christopher Allison • Rodney Boneparte • Graham Cooper • Ben Crouse • Stephan Geldenhuys • Phumzile Mbewu • Ruhan Meiring • Paul Mente • Vusi Msibi • Sindile Ngcese • Jaco Pretorius • Archie Sehlako • Divan Uys

== See also ==
- 2018 Currie Cup Premier Division
- 2018 Currie Cup First Division
