= 2016 Under-19 Provincial Championship =

- Countries: South Africa
- Date: 16 June – 22 October 2016
- Champions: Golden Lions U19
- Runners-up: Western Province U19
- Matches played: 45
- Tries scored: 379 (average 8.4 per match)
- Top point scorer: Jeanluc Cilliers (185)
- Top try scorer: Madosh Tambwe (16)

The 2016 Under-19 Provincial Championship was the 2016 edition of the Under-19 Provincial Championship, an annual national Under-19 rugby union competition held in South Africa, and was contested from 17 June to 22 October 2016. The competition was won by Golden Lions U19 who beat Western Province U19 60–19 in the final played on 22 October 2016.

== Competition rules and information ==
There were seven participating teams in the 2016 Under-19 Provincial Championship. These teams played each other twice over the course of the season, once at home and once away.

Teams received four points for a win and two points for a draw. Bonus points were awarded to teams that scored four or more tries in a game, as well as to teams that lost a match by seven points or less. Teams were ranked by log points, then points difference (points scored less points conceded).

The top four teams qualified for the title play-off semi-finals. The team that finished first had home advantage against the team that finished fourth, while the team that finished second had home advantage against the team that finished third. The final was played as a curtain raiser for the 2016 Currie Cup Premier Division final.

== Teams ==
Location of teams in the 2016 Under-19 Provincial Championship

The following teams took part in the 2016 Under-19 Provincial Championship:

2016 Under-19 Provincial Championship teams
Team name	Stadium
Blue Bulls U19	Loftus Versfeld, Pretoria
Eastern Province U19	Nelson Mandela Bay Stadium, Port Elizabeth
Free State U19	Free State Stadium, Bloemfontein
Golden Lions U19	Ellis Park Stadium, Johannesburg
Leopards U19	Olën Park, Potchefstroom
Sharks U19	Kings Park Stadium, Durban
Western Province U19	Newlands Stadium, Cape Town

== Standings ==
The final league standings for the 2016 Under-19 Provincial Championship was:

2016 Under-19 Provincial Championship standings
Pos	Team	P	W	D	L	PF	PA	PD	TF	TA	TB	LB	Pts
1	Western Province U19	12	10	0	2	493	278	+215	66	35	9	1	50
2	Blue Bulls U19	12	10	0	2	427	225	+202	62	27	8	2	50
3	Golden Lions U19	12	9	0	3	537	236	+301	73	30	8	2	46
4	Free State U19	12	6	0	6	366	308	+58	49	39	5	1	30
5	Sharks U19	12	4	0	8	294	426	−132	44	61	6	2	24
6	Eastern Province U19	12	3	0	9	308	497	−189	39	73	5	3	20
7	Leopards U19	12	0	0	12	167	622	−455	22	90	1	2	3
Final standings.

Legend and competition rules
Legend:
Top four teams qualified to the semi-finals.	P = Games played, W = Games won, D = Games drawn, L = Games lost, PF = Points for, PA = Points against, PD = Points difference, TF = Tries for, TA = Tries against, TB = Try bonus points, LB = Losing bonus points, Pts = Log points
Competition rules:
Play-offs: The top four teams qualified to the semi-finals, with the higher-placed team having home advantage. Points breakdown: * 4 points for a win * 2 points for a draw * 1 bonus point for a loss by seven points or less * 1 bonus point for scoring four or more tries in a match

=== Round-by-round ===
The table below shows each team's progression throughout the season. For each round, their cumulative points total is shown with the overall log position in brackets:

Team Progression – 2016 Under-19 Provincial Championship
Team	R1	R2	R3	R4	R5	R6	R7	R8	R9	R10	R11	R12	R13	R14	Semi	Final
Western Province U19	0 (5th)	5 (3rd)	9 (3rd)	13 (2nd)	18 (2nd)	23 (1st)	27 (1st)	27 (2nd)	32 (1st)	34 (2nd)	39 (2nd)	44 (2nd)	49 (1st)	50 (1st)	Won	Lost
Blue Bulls U19	4 (3rd)	8 (1st)	13 (1st)	18 (1st)	23 (1st)	23 (2nd)	24 (2nd)	29 (1st)	30 (2nd)	35 (1st)	40 (1st)	45 (1st)	45 (2nd)	50 (2nd)	Lost	—
Golden Lions U19	5 (1st)	6 (2nd)	7 (4th)	7 (4th)	7 (5th)	12 (5th)	17 (4th)	22 (3rd)	26 (3rd)	31 (3rd)	36 (3rd)	36 (3rd)	41 (3rd)	46 (3rd)	Won	Won
Free State U19	1 (4th)	1 (6th)	1 (7th)	6 (6th)	11 (4th)	16 (3rd)	20 (3rd)	20 (4th)	20 (4th)	20 (4th)	20 (4th)	20 (4th)	25 (4th)	30 (4th)	Lost	—
Sharks U19	0 (6th)	5 (5th)	5 (5th)	6 (5th)	6 (6th)	6 (6th)	6 (6th)	11 (6th)	16 (6th)	18 (6th)	19 (6th)	24 (4th)	24 (5th)	24 (5th)	—	—
Eastern Province U19	5 (2nd)	5 (4th)	10 (2nd)	11 (3rd)	12 (3rd)	14 (4th)	14 (5th)	16 (5th)	16 (5th)	20 (5th)	20 (5th)	20 (5th)	20 (6th)	20 (6th)	—	—
Leopards U19	0 (7th)	0 (7th)	2 (6th)	2 (7th)	2 (7th)	2 (7th)	2 (7th)	2 (7th)	2 (7th)	3 (7th)	3 (7th)	3 (7th)	3 (7th)	3 (7th)	—	—
Key:	win	draw	loss	bye												

== Matches ==
The following matches were played in the 2016 Under-19 Provincial Championship:

=== Round one ===
16 June 2016	Leopards U19	8–75	Golden Lions U19	Olën Park, Potchefstroom
15:00	Try: Shakeel Fredericks 65'; Con: Hein Steenkamp (0/1); Pen: JP Wegner 10' (1/1)	Scoreboard	Try: HP van Schoor 2', 68'; Xander Crause 12'; Stean Pienaar 17', 47'; Bradley Thain 27'; Wayne van der Bank 38'; Jeanluc Cilliers 43'; Bader Pretorius 56'; Eddie Fouché 60'; Divan Henning 73'; Con: Jeanluc Cilliers 3', 18', 27', 39', 44', 48', 61' (7/8); Bader Pretorius 57', 69', 73' (3/3); Cards: Adré Smith (yellow card) 40' to 50'	Referee: Vusi Msibi

17 June 2016	Blue Bulls U19	18–16	Free State U19	Loftus Versfeld, Pretoria
15:00	Try: Jordan Holgate 3'; Dylan van der Walt 29'; Con: Lourens Steenkamp 4' (1/2); Pen: Lourens Steenkamp 25', 38' (2/3)	Scoreboard	Try: Christiaan Schutte 20'; Con: Christiaan Schutte 21' (1/1); Pen: Christiaan Schutte 35', 40', 45' (3/3); Drop: Christiaan Schutte (0/1)	Referee: Pablo Deluca

17 June 2016	Eastern Province U19	30–17	Sharks U19	Hoërskool Framesby, Port Elizabeth
15:00	Try: Victor Foster 25'; Duan du Plessis 39'; Yaw Penxe 45'; Courtney Winnaar 54'; Con: Victor Foster 46', 55' (2/4); Pen: Victor Foster 7', 18' (2/2); Cards: Jonathan Booysen (yellow card) 50' to 60'	Scoreboard	Try: Samuel Swanepoel 30'; Khuthu Mchunu 49'; Con: Gareth Simpson 31', 50' (2/2); Pen: Gareth Simpson 6' (1/1)	Referee: Pieter Maritz

Bye/s: Western Province U19

=== Round two ===
24 June 2016	Sharks U19	38–16	Leopards U19	Kings Park Stadium, Durban
12:00	Try: Clifferd Jacobs 10'; James Tedder 20'; Tristan Dixon 37', 40'; Luan James 58'; Francois de Villiers 70'; Con: Gareth Simpson 38', 41', 59', 71' (4/6); Pen: Gareth Simpson (0/1)	Scoreboard	Try: Slabber la Grange 25'; Franco Tiedt 29'; Con: Slabber la Grange (0/1); Hein Steenkamp (0/1); Pen: Hein Steenkamp 17' (1/2); Slabber la Grange 45' (1/1); Drop: Slabber la Grange (0/1)	Referee: Pablo Deluca

24 June 2016	Golden Lions U19	13–15	Blue Bulls U19	Ellis Park Stadium, Johannesburg
15:00	Try: Xander Crause 29'; Con: Jeanluc Cilliers 30' (1/1); Pen: Jeanluc Cilliers 22', 53' (2/3)	Scoreboard	Try: Jordan Holgate 6'; Jason Olivier 68'; Con: Lourens Steenkamp 7' (1/1); Jason Olivier (0/1); Pen: Lourens Steenkamp 9' (1/1)	Referee: Ruhan Meiring

25 June 2016	Free State U19	18–50	Western Province U19	Old Greys Rugby Field, Bloemfontein
13:00	Try: Damien Cederas 9'; Kobus Lombard 61'; Con: Christiaan Schutte 10' (1/2); Pen: Christiaan Schutte 15', 24' (2/3); Cards: Kobus Lombard (yellow card) 50' to 59'; Ryan van der Westhuizen (yellow card) 64'; Bertie de Bod (yellow card) 66'	Scoreboard	Try: Wikus Groenewald 5'; Matt Wiseman 33'; Nico Leonard 39', 67'; Reutumetse Mogoje 52'; Ryan Muller 65'; Tristan Leyds 70'; Con: Jondré Williams 34', 40', 53' (3/5); Tristan Leyds 66', 68', 70' (3/3); Pen: Jondré Williams 2' (1/1); Shaine Orderson (0/1); Cards: Jordan Chait (yellow card) 24' to 34'; Nama Xaba (yellow card) 56'	Attendance: 100; Referee: Ricus van der Hoven

Bye/s: Eastern Province U19

=== Round three ===
1 July 2016	Leopards U19	36–39	Eastern Province U19	Olën Park, Potchefstroom
12:00	Try: Hein Steenkamp 23', 36'; Craig Ellis 33'; Ryno Visagie 54'; Con: Quintin Bayards 34' (1/3); Slabber la Grange 55' (1/1); Pen: Quintin Bayards 6', 12', 43' (3/3); Slabber La Grange 60' (1/1)	Scoreboard	Try: Jonathan Booysen 9'; Victor Foster 15', 35'; Yaw Penxe 45'; Daniel Voigt 48'; Con: Victor Foster 10', 16', 35', 49' (4/5); Pen: Victor Foster 31', 65' (2/4)	Referee: Ruhan Meiring

1 July 2016	Blue Bulls U19	50–21	Sharks U19	Loftus Versfeld, Pretoria
16:45	Try: Ciaran Dayaram 6'; Irvin Ali 9', 25'; Gerhard Steenekamp 13'; Louwtjie Steenkamp 29', 31'; Boeta Hamman 41'; Jaco Bezuidenhout 49'; Con: Louwtjie Steenkamp 7', 14', 30', 32', 50' (5/7); Boeta Hamman (0/1); Cards: Marius Verwey (yellow card) 59' to 69'	Scoreboard	Try: Mfundu Ndhlovu 22'; Khuthu Mchunu 35'; Jordan Zietsman 61'; Con: James Tedder 23', 35', 62' (3/4)	Referee: Ricus van der Hoven

2 July 2016	Western Province U19	23–18	Golden Lions U19	City Park Stadium, Athlone
14:30	Try: Jondré Williams 8'; Nico Leonard 28'; Con: Jondré Williams 9', 29' (2/2); Pen: Jondré Williams 11', 18', 58' (3/3); Cards: Jordan Sesink-Clee (yellow card) 31' to 41'	Scoreboard	Try: Wayne van der Bank 25'; Xander Crause 68'; Con: Jeanluc Cilliers 26' (1/2); Pen: Jeanluc Cilliers 33', 37' (2/2); Bradley Thain (0/1); Cards: Leo Kruger (yellow card) 34'	Referee: Pieter Maritz

Bye/s: Free State U19

=== Round four ===
8 July 2016	Eastern Province U19	24–28	Blue Bulls U19	Hoërskool Framesby, Port Elizabeth
15:00	Try: Yaw Penxe 1', 32'; CJ van Niekerk 50'; Con: Victor Foster 2', 33', 51' (3/3); Pen: Victor Foster 59' (1/2); Cards: CJ van Niekerk (yellow card) 16'	Scoreboard	Try: Irvin Ali 14'; Luvuyo Ndevu 17', 46'; Nico Peyper 70'; Con: Louwtjie Steenkamp 18' (1/4); Pen: Louwtjie Steenkamp 6', 11' (2/2)	Referee: Sindile Ngcese

8 July 2016	Golden Lions U19	22–30	Free State U19	Emirates Airline Park, Johannesburg
16:30	Try: Bader Pretorius 3'; Adré Smith 15'; Madosh Tambwe 59'; Con: Jeanluc Cilliers 4', 16' (2/2); Bader Pretorius (0/1); Pen: Bader Pretorius (0/1); Jeanluc Cilliers 22' (1/1); Cards: Bader Pretorius (yellow card) 39' to 50'	Scoreboard	Try: Jan Lourens Schreuder 8'; Damien Cederas 27'; Ruan Henning 52'; Marnus van der Merwe 70'; Con: Christiaan Schutte 28', 53' (2/4); Pen: Christiaan Schutte 39', 47' (2/3)	Referee: Paul Mente

9 July 2016	Sharks U19	15–18	Western Province U19	Growthpoint Kings Park, Durban
16:50	Try: Andrew Evans 4'; Samuel Swanepoel 14'; Con: James Tedder 5' (1/3); Pen: James Tedder 46' (1/1); Cards: Khail Kotzenberg (yellow card) 31' to 41'; Jordan Els (yellow card) 48' to 58'	Scoreboard	Try: Ryan Muller 33'; Tristan Leyds 39'; Con: Jordan Chait 34' (1/3); Pen: Jordan Chait 9', 65' (2/2)	Referee: Archie Sehlako

Bye/s: Leopards U19

=== Round five ===
15 July 2016	Blue Bulls U19	65–15	Leopards U19	Loftus Versfeld, Pretoria
15:00	Try: Irvin Ali 9', 23'; Erich Cronjé 14', 17', 59', 64'; Adriaan Burger 20'; Andell Loubser 29'; Manie Libbok 33'; Heino Bezuidenhout 46'; Sentle Lehoko 50'; Con: Andell Loubser 10', 18', 24', 65' (4/8); Manie Libbok 51' (1/3)	Scoreboard	Try: Slabber la Grange 66'; Marthinus Vermeulen 69'; Con: Shakeel Fredericks 67' (1/1); Slabber la Grange (0/1); Pen: JP Wegner 1' (1/1)	Referee: Lourens van der Merwe

16 July 2016	Western Province U19	53–29	Eastern Province U19	DHL Newlands, Cape Town
12:00	Try: Jondré Williams 11', 28'; Ricky Nwagbara 19'; Tumi Mogoje 31', 43'; Tristan Leyds 37'; George Lourens 58'; David Brits 68'; Con: Jondré Williams 12', 29', 32', 59' (4/7); Troy Payne 69' (1/1); Pen: Jondré Williams 7' (1/2)	Scoreboard	Try: Courtney Winnaar 2', 33'; Jonathan Booysen 15'; Michael Botha 50'; Con: Victor Foster 16', 34', 51' (3/4); Pen: Victor Foster 39' (1/1); Cards: Mylo Sadiki (yellow card) 25' to 36'	Referee: Francois Pretorius

16 July 2016	Free State U19	45–5	Sharks U19	Free State Stadium, Bloemfontein
14:30	Try: Jan Lourens Schreuder 22'; Damien Cederas 25'; Christiaan Schutte 35'; Jurie Burger 41'; Justin Taylor 45'; Jarik van der Walt 65'; Con: Christiaan Schutte 23', 26', 35', 42', 46', 66' (6/6); Pen: Christiaan Schutte 10' (1/2); Cards: George Rossouw (yellow card) 32' to 42'	Scoreboard	Try: Samuel Swanepoel 15'; Con: James Tedder (0/1); Cards: Donovan du Randt (yellow card) 21' to 32'; James Tedder (yellow card) 49' to 59'	Attendance: 200; Referee: Jaco Kotze

Bye/s: Golden Lions U19

=== Round six ===
22 July 2016	Eastern Province U19	29–36	Free State U19	Hoërskool Framesby, Port Elizabeth
15:00	Try: Victor Foster 14', 30'; Yomi Keswa 44'; Mylo Sadiki 55'; Con: Cliven Loubser (0/1); Victor Foster 31', 45', 56' (3/3); Pen: Victor Foster 61' (1/1); Cards: Lupumlo Mguca (yellow card) 64'	Scoreboard	Try: Jurie Burger 7'; Sibabalo Qoma 17'; Marnus van der Merwe 39'; Berco Venter 47'; Jan Lourens Schreuder 58'; Abri Coetzee 65'; Con: Christiaan Schutte 18', 66' (2/5); Ruan Henning 59' (1/1)	Referee: Pieter Maritz

22 July 2016	Sharks U19	12–52	Golden Lions U19	Growthpoint Kings Park, Durban
15:00	Try: Mfundu Ndhlovu 30'; Taigh Schoor 33'; Con: James Tedder 31' (1/2)	Scoreboard	Try: Stean Pienaar 6', 70'; Tyreeq February 16'; HP van Schoor 38'; Bradley Thain 43'; Madosh Tambwe 59', 61'; Douglas Bruce-Smith 68'; Con: Jeanluc Cilliers 17', 39', 44', 60', 62' (5/6); Bader Pretorius 71' (1/2)	Referee: Ruhan Meiring

22 July 2016	Leopards U19	5–66	Western Province U19	Olën Park, Potchefstroom
15:30	Try: Quintin Bayards 42'; Con: Slabber la Grange (0/1); Cards: Hugo Slabber (yellow card) 69'	Scoreboard	Try: Zain Davids 11'; Lee-Marvin Mazibuko 13'; Jordan Chait 17'; Nama Xaba 21'; David Brits 29', 32'; Adriaan van der Bank 37'; Carlü Sadie 48'; Cobus Wiese 70'; Con: Jondré Williams 12', 14', 18', 22', 30', 33', 38', 49', 71' (9/9); Pen: Jondré Williams 8' (1/2)	Referee: Mpho Matsaung

Bye/s: Blue Bulls U19

=== Round seven ===
5 August 2016	Blue Bulls U19	17–18	Western Province U19	Loftus Versfeld, Pretoria
13:10	Try: penalty try 14'; Heino Bezuidenhout 40'; Con: Louwtjie Steenkamp 14', 41' (2/2); Pen: Louwtjie Steenkamp 35' (1/1)	Scoreboard	Try: Tristan Leyds 20'; Tumi Mogoje 42'; Con: Jondré Williams 21' (1/2); Pen: Jondré Williams 6', 61' (2/2); Cards: Jordan Chait (yellow card) 14' to 24'	Referee: Jaco Pretorius

5 August 2016	Golden Lions U19	52–30	Eastern Province U19	Emirates Airline Park, Johannesburg
14:30	Try: Tyreeq February 11'; Bader Pretorius 24'; Stean Pienaar 28', 33'; Patrick Wait 38'; HP van Schoor 51'; Madosh Tambwe 55'; Len Massyn 61'; Con: Jeanluc Cilliers 12', 25', 29', 34', 38' (5/6); Bader Pretorius 56' (1/2); Cards: Reinhard Nothnagel (yellow card) 17' to 27'; Rouxbann Baumann (yellow card) 59' to 69'	Scoreboard	Try: Mylo Sadiki 36'; Jonathan Booysen 47'; Reinhardt Engelbrecht 57'; Con: Cliven Loubser 37', 48', 58' (3/3); Pen: Courtney Winnaar (0/1); Cliven Loubser 6', 19', 31' (3/3)	Referee: Lourens van der Merwe

6 August 2016	Leopards U19	11–24	Free State U19	Olën Park, Potchefstroom
11:00	Try: Daine Kannemeyer 43'; Con: Hein Steenkamp (0/1); Pen: Hein Steenkamp 10', 31' (2/2); Cards: Shawn Stoltz (yellow card) 38' to 48'	Scoreboard	Try: George Rossouw 17'; Kobus Lombard 51'; Kurt Eybers 61'; Con: Christiaan Schutte 18', 52', 62' (3/3); Pen: Christiaan Schutte 25' (1/2)	Referee: Archie Sehlako

Bye/s: Sharks U19

=== Round eight ===
12 August 2016	Sharks U19	45–41	Eastern Province U19	Growthpoint Kings Park, Durban
15:30	Try: Mfundu Ndhlovu 5'; André Coetzee 15'; Clifferd Jacobs 32'; Taigh Schoor 39', 58'; Francois de Villiers 50', 65'; Con: James Tedder 6', 33', 40', 51', 59' (5/7); Pen: James Tedder (0/1)	Scoreboard	Try: Michael Botha 3'; Yomi Keswa 8', 36'; Thaki Boloko 11'; Courtney Winnaar 19'; Jonathan Booysen 26'; Con: Courtney Winnaar 4', 9', 12', 20' (4/6); Pen: Courtney Winnaar 60' (1/1)	Referee: Ricus van der Hoven

13 August 2016	Golden Lions U19	75–19	Leopards U19	Emirates Airline Park, Johannesburg
10:15	Try: Bader Pretorius 6', 52'; HP van Schoor 12'; Wayne van der Bank 17'; Eddie Fouché 33'; Madosh Tambwe 37', 47'; Stean Pienaar 58', 72'; Morné van den Berg 62'; MC de Jongh 69'; Con: Jeanluc Cilliers 7', 17', 34', 38', 48' (5/6); Eddie Fouché 53', 59', 63', 70', 73' (5/5)	Scoreboard	Try: Franco Tiedt 43'; Godfrey Simelane 49'; Ryno Visagie 65'; Con: Hein Steenkamp 50' (1/2); Tryston-Lee van Schalkwyk 66' (1/1)	Referee: Vusi Msibi

13 August 2016	Free State U19	19–40	Blue Bulls U19	Free State Stadium, Bloemfontein
12:00	Try: Justin Taylor 25'; George Rossouw 48'; Marnus van der Merwe 53'; Con: Christiaan Schutte (0/1); Justin Taylor 49', 54' (2/2); Pen: Christiaan Schutte (0/1); Cards: Ruan Henning (yellow card) 41' to 52'	Scoreboard	Try: Heino Bezuidenhout 9'; Erich Cronjé 30'; Ruben van Heerden 38'; Eduan Lubbe 42'; Simphiwe Matanzima 70'; Con: Josh Allderman 10', 31', 39' (3/4); Jason Olivier (0/1); Pen: Josh Allderman 6', 21', 35' (3/3); Cards: Erich Cronjé (yellow card) 14' to 24'	Attendance: 100; Referee: Jaco Kotze

Bye/s: Western Province U19

=== Round nine ===
19 August 2016	Western Province U19	33–20	Free State U19	Newlands Stadium, Cape Town
12:00	Try: Tumi Mogoje 8', 17'; Nico Leonard 29'; Ryan Muller 36'; Con: Jordan Chait 9', 30' (2/4); Pen: Jordan Chait 13' (1/1); Adriaan van der Bank 66', 69' (2/2); Cards: Nico Leonard (yellow card) 40'; Nama Xaba (yellow card) 57' to 67'	Scoreboard	Try: Ruan Henning 10'; Marnus van der Merwe 41'; Con: Christiaan Schutte 11', 42' (2/3); Pen: Christiaan Schutte 16', 20' (2/2)	Referee: Paul Mente

19 August 2016	Blue Bulls U19	14–19	Golden Lions U19	Loftus Versfeld, Pretoria
15:20	Try: Stedman Gans 44'; Con: Louwtjie Steenkamp (0/1); Pen: Louwtjie Steenkamp 30', 33', 57' (3/3); Cards: Hendré Stassen (yellow card) 63'	Scoreboard	Try: Eddie Fouché 55'; Con: Jeanluc Cilliers 56' (1/1); Pen: Jeanluc Cilliers 4', 48', 60', 66' (4/5)	Referee: Ruhan Meiring

20 August 2016	Leopards U19	12–31	Sharks U19	Olën Park, Potchefstroom
11:00	Try: JC van Schalkwyk 20'; Quintin Bayards 62'; Con: Hein Steenkamp 21' (1/2); Cards: Christiaan Steyn (yellow card) 52' to 62'	Scoreboard	Try: Francois de Villiers 3', 30'; Cornelius Otto 48', 67'; Con: Gareth Simpson 4', 31', 49' (3/3); James Tedder 68' (1/1); Pen: Gareth Simpson 7' (1/1); Cards: Jordan Els (yellow card) 56' to 67'	Referee: Pieter Maritz

Bye/s: Eastern Province U19

=== Round ten ===
26 August 2016	Eastern Province U19	23–19	Leopards U19	Nelson Mandela Bay Stadium, Port Elizabeth
13:00	Try: Yaw Penxe 8'; Jonathan Booysen 12'; Con: Victor Foster 9', 13' (2/2); Pen: Victor Foster 5', 28', 40' (3/4); Cards: Lutho Selem (yellow card) 69'	Scoreboard	Try: Edmund Rheeder 24'; Reuben du Plooy 38'; Andries Engelbrecht 57'; Con: Tiaan Schoonraad 25', 39' (2/3); Cards: Franco Tiedt (yellow card) 42' to 53'	Referee: Vusi Msibi

26 August 2016	Golden Lions U19	43–36	Western Province U19	Emirates Airline Park, Johannesburg
12:30	Try: Madosh Tambwe 13'; Stean Pienaar 25'; Hacjivah Dayimani 41'; Morné van den Berg 63'; Con: Jeanluc Cilliers 14', 26', 42', 64' (4/4); Pen: Jeanluc Cilliers 7', 28', 30', 36', 57' (5/5)	Scoreboard	Try: Brandon Salomo 9'; Cornel Smit 16', 66'; David Brits 21'; Ernst van Rhyn 50'; Con: Jordan Chait 10', 17', 22' (3/3); Adriaan van der Bank 67' (1/2); Pen: Jordan Chait 3' (1/2); Adriaan van der Bank (0/1)	Referee: Pieter Maritz

27 August 2016	Sharks U19	22–28	Blue Bulls U19	Growthpoint Kings Park, Durban
14:15	Try: Donovan du Randt 3'; James Tedder 41', 45'; Taigh Schoor 55'; Con: Gareth Simpson 42' (1/4); Cards: Donovan du Randt (yellow card) 18' to 28'	Scoreboard	Try: Nico Peyper 14', 18'; Stedman Gans 26'; Ciaran Dayaram 36'; Con: Manie Libbok 15', 19', 27', 37' (4/4)	Referee: Ricus van der Hoven

Bye/s: Free State U19

=== Round eleven ===
2 September 2016	Blue Bulls U19	40–21	Eastern Province U19	Loftus Versfeld, Pretoria
15:00	Try: Eduan Lubbe 5', 70'; Stedman Gans 8'; Manie Libbok 21', 53'; Ciaran Dayaram 47'; Con: Josh Allderman (0/1); Manie Libbok 9', 22', 48', 54', 71' (5/5)	Scoreboard	Try: Yaw Penxe 24'; Courtney Winnaar 68'; Con: Victor Foster 25' (1/2); Pen: Victor Foster 2' (1/1); Courtney Winnaar 16', 34' (2/3)	Referee: Jaco Pretorius

3 September 2016	Free State U19	25–38	Golden Lions U19	Free State Stadium, Bloemfontein
11:00	Try: penalty try 7'; Jurie Burger 28'; Jarik van der Walt 47'; Con: Christiaan Schutte 8', 29' (2/3); Pen: Christiaan Schutte 5', 15' (2/2)	Scoreboard	Try: Morné van den Berg 11'; Stean Pienaar 23', 37'; Jeanluc Cilliers 34'; Con: Jeanluc Cilliers 12', 24', 38' (3/4); Pen: Jeanluc Cilliers 20', 31', 57', 58' (4/4); Cards: Madosh Tambwe (yellow card) 7' to 19'	Attendance: 200; Referee: Vusi Msibi

3 September 2016	Western Province U19	48–40	Sharks U19	DHL Newlands, Cape Town
12:00	Try: Matt Wiseman 9', 25', 40'; Juarno Augustus 20'; Nama Xaba 30'; Damian Willemse 69'; Con: Jondré Williams 10', 21', 31', 41' (4/6); Pen: Jondré Williams 19', 57', 65' (3/3)	Scoreboard	Try: Taigh Schoor 12'; Ilunga Mukendi 15'; Clifferd Jacobs 32'; Khail Kotzenberg 50', 52'; Francois de Villiers 54'; Con: Gareth Simpson 13', 16', 33', 51', 53' (5/6)	Referee: Jaco Kotze

Bye/s: Leopards U19

=== Round twelve ===
9 September 2016	Eastern Province U19	15–64	Western Province U19	Hoërskool Framesby, Port Elizabeth
13:00	Try: Victor Foster 23'; Jonathan Booysen 56'; Con: Victor Foster (0/1); Yomi Keswa 57' (1/1); Pen: Victor Foster 10' (1/4); Cards: Janse Roux (yellow card) 37' to 47'	Scoreboard	Try: Cornel Smit 6'; Shane Farmer 26'; Jondré Williams 38'; Cobus Wiese 42', 52', 63'; David Brits 46'; Juarno Augustus 61'; Nico Leonard 70'; Con: Jondré Williams 7', 39', 43', 47', 53' (5/6); Adriaan van der Bank 62', 64', 71' (3/3); Pen: Jondré Williams 17' (1/1)	Referee: Lourens van der Merwe

10 September 2016	Leopards U19	7–62	Blue Bulls U19	Olën Park, Potchefstroom
11:30	Try: Matimu Manganyi 19'; Con: Tiaan Schoonraad 20' (1/1)	Scoreboard	Try: Matt Kriel 1'; Embrose Papier 7'; Jaco Bezuidenhout 14'; Johan Grobbelaar 16'; Stedman Gans 22', 56'; Erich Cronjé 37', 46'; Nico Peyper 53'; Andell Loubser 69'; Con: Earll Douwrie 15', 23', 38', 47', 54', 57' (6/9); Andell Loubser (0/1)	Referee: Ricus van der Hoven

10 September 2016	Sharks U19	29–15	Free State U19	Growthpoint Kings Park, Durban
13:10	Try: Mfundu Ndhlovu 11'; Donovan du Randt 27'; Mthokozisi Ntuli 53'; James Tedder 61'; Con: Gareth Simpson 28', 54', 62' (3/4); Pen: Gareth Simpson 6' (1/1)	Scoreboard	Try: Etienne Becker 8'; Justin Taylor 68'; Con: Justin Taylor 9' (1/2); Pen: Justin Taylor 46' (1/1)	Referee: Rodney Boneparte

Bye/s: Golden Lions U19

=== Round thirteen ===
15 September 2016	Free State U19	48–22	Eastern Province U19	Free State Stadium, Bloemfontein
14:30	Try: Warren Brits 17'; Kurt Eybers 22', 38'; George Rossouw 29'; Rewan Kruger 46'; Bertie de Bod 62'; Dawid Snyman 69'; Con: Justin Taylor 23', 30', 39', 47', 70' (5/7); Pen: Justin Taylor 11' (1/1)	Scoreboard	Try: Oyisa Hackula 13'; Yaw Penxe 50', 54'; Con: Victor Foster 14', 55' (2/3); Pen: Victor Foster 3' (1/1)	Attendance: 200; Referee: Jaco Kotze

16 September 2016	Golden Lions U19	71–19	Sharks U19	Emirates Airline Park, Johannesburg
13:30	Try: Eddie Fouché 3', 54'; Hacjivah Dayimani 15', 25'; Wayne van der Bank 19'; Jan-Louis la Grange 29'; Bradley Thain 33'; Wandisile Simelane 47', 65'; Madosh Tambwe 49'; Tyreeq February 56'; Con: Jeanluc Cilliers 16', 20', 26', 30', 34' (5/7); Eddie Fouché 48', 50', 55' (3/4); Cards: Leo Kruger (yellow card) 40'; Len Massyn (yellow card) 72'	Scoreboard	Try: Migcobo Bovu 68', 73'; Mfundu Ndhlovu 70'; Con: Gareth Simpson 69' (1/2); Mfundu Ndhlovu 71' (1/1)	Referee: Paul Mente

17 September 2016	Western Province U19	54–8	Leopards U19	DHL Newlands, Cape Town
12:00	Try: Ernst van Rhyn 4', 57'; Juarno Augustus 27', 30', 41', 62'; Nico Leonard 32'; Tristan Leyds 70'; Con: Jondré Williams 5', 28', 33', 42' (4/5); Damian Willemse 58', 63', 71' (3/3); Cards: Ryan Muller (yellow card) 12' to 22'; Nico Leonard (yellow card) 48'	Scoreboard	Try: Zwivhuya Mulaudzi 37'; Con: Tiaan Schoonraad (0/1); Pen: Tiaan Schoonraad 2' (1/1)	Referee: Francois Pretorius

Bye/s: Blue Bulls U19

=== Round fourteen ===
23 September 2016	Free State U19	70–11	Leopards U19	Free State Stadium, Bloemfontein
13:30	Try: Jurie Burger 26'; Kurt Eybers 29', 58'; Justin Taylor 35'; Marnus Boshoff 38'; Marnus van der Merwe 44'; Ewan Coetzee 47'; Warren Brits 61'; Dawid Snyman 67'; Kobus Lombard 70'; Con: Justin Taylor 27', 30', 35', 39', 45', 48', 59', 62', 68', 70' (10/10)	Scoreboard	Try: Reuben du Plooy 31'; Con: JP Wegner (0/1); Pen: JP Wegner 20', 37' (2/3)	Attendance: 100; Referee: Ben Crouse

23 September 2016	Western Province U19	30–50	Blue Bulls U19	A.F. Markötter Stadium, Stellenbosch
15:00	Try: Juarno Augustus 62', 69', 72'; Nico Leonard 67'; Con: Damian Willemse 63', 70' (2/3); Nico Leonard (0/1); Pen: Jondré Williams 7', 11' (2/2)	Scoreboard	Try: Heino Bezuidenhout 2', 28'; Irvin Ali 8'; Jaco Bezuidenhout 24'; Stedman Gans 39', 58'; Hendré Stassen 55'; Con: Manie Libbok 3', 9', 25', 29', 40', 56' (6/7); Pen: Manie Libbok 21' (1/1)	Referee: Mike Adamson

24 September 2016	Eastern Province U19	5–59	Golden Lions U19	Nelson Mandela Bay Stadium, Port Elizabeth
12:30	Try: Jonathan Booysen 3'; Con: Victor Foster (0/1)	Scoreboard	Try: Madosh Tambwe 8', 12', 48', 61'; Hacjivah Dayimani 18', 22'; Reinhard Nothnagel 30'; Jan-Louis la Grange 54'; Morné van den Berg 67'; Con: Jeanluc Cilliers 13', 19', 23', 31', 49', 62', 68' (7/9)	Referee: Ruhan Meiring

Bye/s: Sharks U19

=== Semi-finals ===
14 October 2016	Western Province U19	30–15	Free State U19	City Park Stadium, Athlone
13:15	Try: Juarno Augustus 30', 33'; David Brits 57'; Cornel Smit 62'; Con: Jondré Williams 31', 63' (2/4); Pen: Jondré Williams 37' (1/2); Adriaan van der Bank 71' (1/1)	Scoreboard	Try: Kurt Eybers 44'; Marnus Boshoff 68'; Con: Justin Taylor (0/1); Christiaan Schutte 69' (1/1); Pen: Justin Taylor 28' (1/2); Drop: Justin Taylor (0/1)	Referee: Stephan Geldenhuys

15 October 2016	Blue Bulls U19	24–34	Golden Lions U19	Loftus Versfeld, Pretoria
13:30	Try: Gerhard Steenekamp 46'; Andell Loubser 67'; Con: Louwtjie Steenkamp 47' (1/2); Pen: Boeta Hamman 9' (1/1); Louwtjie Steenkamp 19', 29', 54' (3/3)	Scoreboard	Try: Bradley Thain 13'; Stean Pienaar 26', 62'; Wayne van der Bank 38'; Madosh Tambwe 50'; Con: Jeanluc Cilliers 14', 39', 51' (3/5); Pen: Jeanluc Cilliers 56' (1/1); Cards: Adré Smith (red card) 22'	Referee: Jaco Pretorius

=== Final ===
22 October 2016	Western Province U19	19–60	Golden Lions U19	Free State Stadium, Bloemfontein
11:00	Try: Ernst van Rhyn 29'; Juarno Augustus 40'; David Brits 63'; Con: Jondré Williams 30', 41' (2/2); Adriaan van der Bank (0/1)	Scoreboard	Try: Stean Pienaar 11'; Ruan Vermaak 22'; Tyreeq February 25'; Edwin Jansen 33'; Hacjivah Dayimani 49'; Madosh Tambwe 55', 60', 70'; Con: Jeanluc Cilliers 12', 23', 26', 34', 50', 56', 61' (7/7); Eddie Fouché (0/1); Pen: Jeanluc Cilliers 5', 15' (2/2); Drop: Jeanluc Cilliers (0/1)	Referee: Vusi Msibi

== Honours ==
The honour roll for the 2016 Under-19 Provincial Championship was:

2016 Under-19 Provincial Championship Honours
Champions:	Golden Lions U19
Top Try Scorer:	Madosh Tambwe, Golden Lions U19 (16)
Top Points Scorer:	Jeanluc Cilliers, Golden Lions U19 (185)

== Players ==
=== Squads ===
The following squads were named for the 2016 Under-19 Provincial Championship:

Blue Bulls U19 squad
Forwards	Jaco Bezuidenhout • Franco Botha • Adriaan Burger • Johan Grobbelaar • Érik Groenewald • MJ Hayes • Riekert Korff • Eduan Lubbe • Simphiwe Matanzima • Vic Meyer • Mashao Mukhari • Luvuyo Ndevu • Nico Peyper • Ryno Pieterse • JT Potgieter • Ig Prinsloo • Hendré Stassen • Gerhard Steenekamp • O'Neil Thiart • Dylan van der Walt • Ruben van Heerden • Marius Verwey • Did not play: • Cole van Tonder
Backs	Irvin Ali • Josh Allderman • Heino Bezuidenhout • Erich Cronjé • Ciaran Dayaram • Earll Douwrie • Stedman Gans • Boeta Hamman • Jordan Holgate • Matt Kriel • Sentle Lehoko • Manie Libbok • Andell Loubser • Jason Olivier • Embrose Papier • Louwtjie Steenkamp • André Swanepoel • Did not play: • Grant Dixie • Jordan du Preez • Sergio Kasper • Happiness Peterson • Rudi Potgieter • Ivan Smit
Unknown	Did not play: • Evan Booysen • Timothy Davids • Raynard Esterhuizen • Justin Levendal • Christiaan Swanepoel
Coach	Jaco Pienaar

Eastern Province U19 squad
Forwards	Siyanda Am • Dylan Barendse • Liam Blake-Taylor • Temba Boltina • Michael de Marco • Kamva Dilima • Duan du Plessis • Apiwe Febana • Nico Grobler • Matthew King • André Lategan • Ruben le Roux • Leon Lyons • Sive Mazosiwe • Lupumlo Mguca • Thapelo Molapo • Lourens Oosthuizen • Janse Roux • Mylo Sadiki • Lutho Selem • Donavan Stevens • CJ van Niekerk • Grant Venter • Daniel Voigt • Shane Weweje • Did not play: • Connor Thalrose
Backs	Thaki Boloko • Jonathan Booysen • Michael Botha • Reinhardt Engelbrecht • Victor Foster • Oyisa Hackula • Yomi Keswa • Cliven Loubser • Malan Marais • Wayne Moss • Siba Mzanywa • Yaw Penxe • Leslie Sharp • Morgan Steyn • Louis Strydom • Josiah Twum-Boafo • Jac van der Walt • Riaan van Rensburg • Courtney Winnaar • Did not play: • Sihle Njezula

Free State U19 squad
Forwards	Kwenzo Blose • Michiel Bosman • Warren Brits • Jurie Burger • Abri Coetzee • Ewan Coetzee • Bertie de Bod • Dian Dry • Chrisjan du Toit • Lovien Esterhuizen • Kanya Gela • Andrew Kuhn • Kobus Lombard • Phumzile Maqondwana • Helgard Meyer • Thabiso Msiza • Sibabalo Qoma • George Rossouw • Kian Skippers • Jean Smal • Marnus van der Merwe • Boan Venter • Did not play: • Stephan de Jager • Gerald Tinashe Kanyama • Stephanus Johannes Malherbe • Carl Joagim van Wyk
Backs	Etienne Becker • Marnus Boshoff • Damien Cederas • Kurt Eybers • William Eybers • Denzil Fiff • Dian Gouws • Ruan Henning • Luyolo Khuse • Rewan Kruger • Jan Lourens Schreuder • Christiaan Schutte • Dawid Snyman • Justin Taylor • Jarik van der Walt • Johan van der Walt • Ryan van der Westhuizen • Berco Venter • Justin Witbooi • Did not play: • Gideon Francois Agenbach • Donavan Bouwer • Glen Flitoor • Kylan Ethan Griqua • Duncan Horak • Denver Kleu • Joel Mbisha • Eben Nieuwoudt
Unknown	Did not play: • McDyllon Eilerd • Marco Joubert • Chappo Willem-Adriaan Pieterse • Hardus van Eeden • Jacobus Adam Barnard van Tonder

Golden Lions U19 squad
Forwards	Rouxbann Baumann • Jurgens Bence • Niell Bezuidenhout • Justin Brandon • Douglas Bruce-Smith • Hacjivah Dayimani • MC de Jongh • Renaldo Ferreira • Chergin Fillies • Carling Forwood • Edwin Jansen • Leo Kruger • Len Massyn • Nathan McBeth • Reinhard Nothnagel • Thokozani Skhosana • Adré Smith • Chrisjan Steynberg • HP van Schoor • Tiaan Venter • Ruan Vermaak • Patrick Wait • Did not play: • Jaun Jacques Basson • Luyolo Siliziwe Qinela • Dillan Robus
Backs	Jeanluc Cilliers • Xander Crause • Tyreeq February • Eddie Fouché • Divan Henning • Siyabonga Khalishwayo • Jan-Louis la Grange • Stean Pienaar • Bader Pretorius • Mashudu Raphunga • Wandisile Simelane • Madosh Tambwe • Bradley Thain • Morné van den Berg • Wayne van der Bank • Did not play: • Ntobeko Goodman Mkhwanazi • Vuyo Shongwe • Runan Venter
Unknown	Paolo Andrews • Ernst Beumer • Gideon Jacobus Gerhardus Botha • Pierre Jean Rabie

Leopards U19 squad
Forwards	Napoleon de Beer • Reuben du Plooy • Andries Engelbrecht • Johannes Joubert • Coenie Kruger • Damon Lee • Matimu Manganyi • Senzo Mkhize • Zwivhuya Mulaudzi • Jacques Mynhardt • Edmund Rheeder • Armand Roets • Christiaan Steyn • Shawn Stoltz • Jonathan Strydom • Carloux Ueckerman • Corné van der Merwe • Jakob van der Westhuizen • JC van Schalkwyk • Ryno Visagie • Charlton Wagenaar • Christo Willemse
Backs	Quintin Bayards • Etienne Becker • Christopher Coetzee • Jan-Harm Cronjé • Craig Ellis • Shakeel Fredericks • Daine Kannemeyer • Heino Keyser • Slabber la Grange • Mlondi Mnisi • Tiaan Schoonraad • Godfrey Simelane • Hugo Slabber • Hein Steenkamp • Franco Tiedt • Tryston-Lee van Schalkwyk • Marthinus Vermeulen • JP Wegner
Unknown	Tian Francois Boonzaaier • Erlo Heymans • Rhyno Nicolaas Lourens • Brandon Nel • Petrus Johannes Jacobus van der Merwe

Sharks U19 squad
Forwards	Philip Barlow-Jones • André Coetzee • William Day • Tristan Dixon • Jordan Els • Andrew Evans • Bubule Gongqa • Clifferd Jacobs • Chris Klopper • Marco Koen • Khuthu Mchunu • Mthokozisi Ntuli • Cornelius Otto • Muammir Salie • Keegan Sparks • William Squires • Samuel Swanepoel • Lihan Viljoen • Did not play: • Hendrik Pretorius Calitz • Gustav Francois Marais
Backs	Jason Bayford • Migcobo Bovu • Francois de Villiers • Donovan du Randt • Matthew Everitt • Courtney Februarie • Xolisa Guma • Luan James • Gustav Kirstein • Khail Kotzenberg • Ilunga Mukendi • Mfundu Ndhlovu • Taigh Schoor • Gareth Simpson • Hanco Taljaard • James Tedder • Wihan von Wielligh • James Wheeler • Jordan Zietsman
Unknown	Johannes Jacobus Botha • Arnando Dentlinger • Nathan Fincham • Ricky Zanozuko Langman • Matthew Leonard Martin • Sechaba Mqhatu • Tagen Joshua Strydom • Ruan Nicolaas van Rensburg
Coach	Paul Anthony

Western Province U19 squad
Forwards	Imraan Andrews • Juarno Augustus • Zain Davids • Ruben de Villiers • Shane Farmer • Wikus Groenewald • Lee-Marvin Mazibuko • David Meihuizen • Thomas Meyer • Ricky Nwagbara • Shaine Orderson • Carlü Sadie • Jordan Sesink-Clee • Bertus Smith • Joa Swart • Roux Swart • Justin Theys • Etienne van Dyk • Ernst van Rhyn • Johan Visser • Cobus Wiese • Matt Wiseman • Nama Xaba • Did not play: • Ashwyn Adams • Christo Greyling • Jean-Pierre James Smith
Backs	David Brits • Jordan Chait • Munier Hartzenberg • Nico Leonard • Tristan Leyds • George Lourens • Tumi Mogoje • Ryan Muller • Cyprian Nkomo • Troy Payne • Brandon Salomo • Tyron Scholtz • Cornel Smit • Adriaan van der Bank • Damian Willemse • Jondré Williams • Did not play: • Matthew Dahl • Jandré Grobler • Xolile Mdlokovana • Marco Niemandt • Mujaahid van der Hoven • Joshua Vermeulen
Unknown	Stephan Annandale • Michiel Nicolaas Coetzee • Brandon Ashley Collins • Liam John Furniss • Uwe Leon Geissler • André Hauptfleisch • Liam Louw • Mogamad Ridaah Muller • Sam Phiri • Herman van Dyk • Amil Garth van Heerden • Dean van Tonder
Coach	Nazeem Adams • Chris October

=== Points scorers ===
The following table contain points scored in the 2016 Under-19 Provincial Championship:

Top Ten point scorers
No	Player	Team	T	C	P	DG	Pts
1	Jeanluc Cilliers	Golden Lions U19	2	56	21	0	185
2	Jondré Williams	Western Province U19	4	35	15	0	135
3	Victor Foster	Eastern Province U19	6	20	13	0	109
4	Christiaan Schutte	Free State U19	2	20	13	0	89
5	Madosh Tambwe	Golden Lions U19	16	0	0	0	80
6	Stean Pienaar	Golden Lions U19	14	0	0	0	70
7	Louwtjie Steenkamp	Blue Bulls U19	2	10	12	0	66
8	Justin Taylor	Free State U19	4	18	3	0	65
9	Juarno Augustus	Western Province U19	12	0	0	0	60
10	Manie Libbok	Blue Bulls U19	3	16	1	0	50

Other point scorers
No	Player	Team	T	C	P	DG	Pts
11	Gareth Simpson	Sharks U19	0	19	3	0	47
12	James Tedder	Sharks U19	4	11	1	0	45
13	Courtney Winnaar	Eastern Province U19	5	4	3	0	42
14	Eddie Fouché	Golden Lions U19	5	8	0	0	41
15	Yaw Penxe	Eastern Province U19	8	0	0	0	40
16	Jonathan Booysen	Eastern Province U19	7	0	0	0	35
16	David Brits	Western Province U19	7	0	0	0	35
16	Erich Cronjé	Blue Bulls U19	7	0	0	0	35
16	Stedman Gans	Blue Bulls U19	7	0	0	0	35
16	Nico Leonard	Western Province U19	7	0	0	0	35
16	Bader Pretorius	Golden Lions U19	5	5	0	0	35
22	Tristan Leyds	Western Province U19	5	3	0	0	31
23	Irvin Ali	Blue Bulls U19	6	0	0	0	30
23	Hacjivah Dayimani	Golden Lions U19	6	0	0	0	30
23	Francois de Villiers	Sharks U19	6	0	0	0	30
23	Kurt Eybers	Free State U19	6	0	0	0	30
23	Tumi Mogoje	Western Province U19	6	0	0	0	30
28	Jordan Chait	Western Province U19	1	6	4	0	29
29	Mfundu Ndhlovu	Sharks U19	5	1	0	0	27
30	Heino Bezuidenhout	Blue Bulls U19	5	0	0	0	25
30	Taigh Schoor	Sharks U19	5	0	0	0	25
30	Wayne van der Bank	Golden Lions U19	5	0	0	0	25
30	Marnus van der Merwe	Free State U19	5	0	0	0	25
30	HP van Schoor	Golden Lions U19	5	0	0	0	25
35	Adriaan van der Bank	Western Province U19	1	5	3	0	24
36	Andell Loubser	Blue Bulls U19	3	4	0	0	23
36	Hein Steenkamp	Leopards U19	2	2	3	0	23
38	Quintin Bayards	Leopards U19	2	1	3	0	21
39	Jurie Burger	Free State U19	4	0	0	0	20
39	Tyreeq February	Golden Lions U19	4	0	0	0	20
39	Nico Peyper	Blue Bulls U19	4	0	0	0	20
39	Cornel Smit	Western Province U19	4	0	0	0	20
39	Bradley Thain	Golden Lions U19	4	0	0	0	20
39	Morné van den Berg	Golden Lions U19	4	0	0	0	20
39	Ernst van Rhyn	Western Province U19	4	0	0	0	20
39	Cobus Wiese	Western Province U19	4	0	0	0	20
39	Matt Wiseman	Western Province U19	4	0	0	0	20
48	Slabber la Grange	Leopards U19	2	1	2	0	18
49	Yomi Keswa	Eastern Province U19	3	1	0	0	17
50	Josh Allderman	Blue Bulls U19	0	3	3	0	15
50	Jaco Bezuidenhout	Blue Bulls U19	3	0	0	0	15
50	Damien Cederas	Free State U19	3	0	0	0	15
50	Xander Crause	Golden Lions U19	3	0	0	0	15
50	Ciaran Dayaram	Blue Bulls U19	3	0	0	0	15
50	Clifferd Jacobs	Sharks U19	3	0	0	0	15
50	Kobus Lombard	Free State U19	3	0	0	0	15
50	Cliven Loubser	Eastern Province U19	0	3	3	0	15
50	Eduan Lubbe	Blue Bulls U19	3	0	0	0	15
50	Ryan Muller	Western Province U19	3	0	0	0	15
50	George Rossouw	Free State U19	3	0	0	0	15
50	Jan Lourens Schreuder	Free State U19	3	0	0	0	15
50	Samuel Swanepoel	Sharks U19	3	0	0	0	15
50	Damian Willemse	Western Province U19	1	5	0	0	15
64	Earll Douwrie	Blue Bulls U19	0	6	0	0	12
64	Ruan Henning	Free State U19	2	1	0	0	12
64	JP Wegner	Leopards U19	0	0	4	0	12
67	Marnus Boshoff	Free State U19	2	0	0	0	10
67	Michael Botha	Eastern Province U19	2	0	0	0	10
67	Migcobo Bovu	Sharks U19	2	0	0	0	10
67	Warren Brits	Free State U19	2	0	0	0	10
67	Tristan Dixon	Sharks U19	2	0	0	0	10
67	Reuben du Plooy	Leopards U19	2	0	0	0	10
67	Donovan du Randt	Sharks U19	2	0	0	0	10
67	Jordan Holgate	Blue Bulls U19	2	0	0	0	10
67	Khail Kotzenberg	Sharks U19	2	0	0	0	10
67	Jan-Louis la Grange	Golden Lions U19	2	0	0	0	10
67	Khuthu Mchunu	Sharks U19	2	0	0	0	10
67	Luvuyo Ndevu	Blue Bulls U19	2	0	0	0	10
67	Cornelius Otto	Sharks U19	2	0	0	0	10
67	Mylo Sadiki	Eastern Province U19	2	0	0	0	10
67	Wandisile Simelane	Golden Lions U19	2	0	0	0	10
67	Dawid Snyman	Free State U19	2	0	0	0	10
67	Gerhard Steenekamp	Blue Bulls U19	2	0	0	0	10
67	Franco Tiedt	Leopards U19	2	0	0	0	10
67	Jarik van der Walt	Free State U19	2	0	0	0	10
67	Ryno Visagie	Leopards U19	2	0	0	0	10
67	Nama Xaba	Western Province U19	2	0	0	0	10
88	Tiaan Schoonraad	Leopards U19	0	3	1	0	9
89	Boeta Hamman	Blue Bulls U19	1	0	1	0	8
90	Shakeel Fredericks	Leopards U19	1	1	0	0	7
91	Etienne Becker	Free State U19	1	0	0	0	5
91	Thaki Boloko	Eastern Province U19	1	0	0	0	5
91	Douglas Bruce-Smith	Golden Lions U19	1	0	0	0	5
91	Adriaan Burger	Blue Bulls U19	1	0	0	0	5
91	Abri Coetzee	Free State U19	1	0	0	0	5
91	André Coetzee	Sharks U19	1	0	0	0	5
91	Ewan Coetzee	Free State U19	1	0	0	0	5
91	Zain Davids	Western Province U19	1	0	0	0	5
91	Bertie de Bod	Free State U19	1	0	0	0	5
91	MC de Jongh	Golden Lions U19	1	0	0	0	5
91	Duan du Plessis	Eastern Province U19	1	0	0	0	5
91	Craig Ellis	Leopards U19	1	0	0	0	5
91	Andries Engelbrecht	Leopards U19	1	0	0	0	5
91	Reinhardt Engelbrecht	Eastern Province U19	1	0	0	0	5
91	Andrew Evans	Sharks U19	1	0	0	0	5
91	Shane Farmer	Western Province U19	1	0	0	0	5
91	Johan Grobbelaar	Blue Bulls U19	1	0	0	0	5
91	Wikus Groenewald	Western Province U19	1	0	0	0	5
91	Oyisa Hackula	Eastern Province U19	1	0	0	0	5
91	Divan Henning	Golden Lions U19	1	0	0	0	5
91	Luan James	Sharks U19	1	0	0	0	5
91	Edwin Jansen	Golden Lions U19	1	0	0	0	5
91	Daine Kannemeyer	Leopards U19	1	0	0	0	5
91	Matt Kriel	Blue Bulls U19	1	0	0	0	5
91	Rewan Kruger	Free State U19	1	0	0	0	5
91	Sentle Lehoko	Blue Bulls U19	1	0	0	0	5
91	George Lourens	Western Province U19	1	0	0	0	5
91	Matimu Manganyi	Leopards U19	1	0	0	0	5
91	Simphiwe Matanzima	Blue Bulls U19	1	0	0	0	5
91	Len Massyn	Golden Lions U19	1	0	0	0	5
91	Lee-Marvin Mazibuko	Western Province U19	1	0	0	0	5
91	Ilunga Mukendi	Sharks U19	1	0	0	0	5
91	Zwivhuya Mulaudzi	Leopards U19	1	0	0	0	5
91	Reinhard Nothnagel	Golden Lions U19	1	0	0	0	5
91	Mthokozisi Ntuli	Sharks U19	1	0	0	0	5
91	Ricky Nwagbara	Western Province U19	1	0	0	0	5
91	Jason Olivier	Blue Bulls U19	1	0	0	0	5
91	Embrose Papier	Blue Bulls U19	1	0	0	0	5
91	Sibabalo Qoma	Free State U19	1	0	0	0	5
91	Edmund Rheeder	Leopards U19	1	0	0	0	5
91	Carlü Sadie	Western Province U19	1	0	0	0	5
91	Brandon Salomo	Western Province U19	1	0	0	0	5
91	Godfrey Simelane	Leopards U19	1	0	0	0	5
91	Adré Smith	Golden Lions U19	1	0	0	0	5
91	Hendré Stassen	Blue Bulls U19	1	0	0	0	5
91	Dylan van der Walt	Blue Bulls U19	1	0	0	0	5
91	Ruben van Heerden	Blue Bulls U19	1	0	0	0	5
91	CJ van Niekerk	Eastern Province U19	1	0	0	0	5
91	JC van Schalkwyk	Leopards U19	1	0	0	0	5
91	Berco Venter	Free State U19	1	0	0	0	5
91	Ruan Vermaak	Golden Lions U19	1	0	0	0	5
91	Marthinus Vermeulen	Leopards U19	1	0	0	0	5
91	Daniel Voigt	Eastern Province U19	1	0	0	0	5
91	Patrick Wait	Golden Lions U19	1	0	0	0	5
91	Jordan Zietsman	Sharks U19	1	0	0	0	5
146	Troy Payne	Western Province U19	0	1	0	0	2
146	André Swanepoel	Blue Bulls U19	0	1	0	0	2
146	Tryston-Lee van Schalkwyk	Leopards U19	0	1	0	0	2
—	penalty try	Blue Bulls U19	1	0	0	0	5
—	penalty try	Free State U19	1	0	0	0	5
* Legend: T = Tries, C = Conversions, P = Penalties, DG = Drop Goals, Pts = Points.

=== Discipline ===
The following table contains all the cards handed out during the competition:

Red cards or multiple yellow cards
Player	Team	Sent off (straight red)	Temporarily suspended
Adré Smith	Golden Lions U19	1	1
Jordan Chait	Western Province U19	0	2
Donovan du Randt	Sharks U19	0	2
Jordan Els	Sharks U19	0	2
Leo Kruger	Golden Lions U19	0	2
Nico Leonard	Western Province U19	0	2
Nama Xaba	Western Province U19	0	2

Single yellow cards
Player	Team	Sent off (straight red)	Temporarily suspended
Rouxbann Baumann	Golden Lions U19	0	1
Jonathan Booysen	Eastern Province U19	0	1
Erich Cronjé	Blue Bulls U19	0	1
Bertie de Bod	Free State U19	0	1
Ruan Henning	Free State U19	0	1
Khail Kotzenberg	Sharks U19	0	1
Kobus Lombard	Free State U19	0	1
Len Massyn	Golden Lions U19	0	1
Lupumlo Mguca	Eastern Province U19	0	1
Ryan Muller	Western Province U19	0	1
Reinhard Nothnagel	Golden Lions U19	0	1
Bader Pretorius	Golden Lions U19	0	1
George Rossouw	Free State U19	0	1
Janse Roux	Eastern Province U19	0	1
Mylo Sadiki	Eastern Province U19	0	1
Lutho Selem	Eastern Province U19	0	1
Jordan Sesink-Clee	Western Province U19	0	1
Hugo Slabber	Leopards U19	0	1
Hendré Stassen	Blue Bulls U19	0	1
Christiaan Steyn	Leopards U19	0	1
Shawn Stoltz	Leopards U19	0	1
Madosh Tambwe	Golden Lions U19	0	1
James Tedder	Sharks U19	0	1
Franco Tiedt	Leopards U19	0	1
Ryan van der Westhuizen	Free State U19	0	1
CJ van Niekerk	Eastern Province U19	0	1
Marius Verwey	Blue Bulls U19	0	1
* Legend: (red card) = Sent off, (yellow card) = Sin-binned

== Referees ==
The following referees officiated matches in the 2016 Under-19 Provincial Championship:

2016 Under-19 Provincial Championship referees
Referees	Mike Adamson • Rodney Boneparte • Ben Crouse • Pablo Deluca • Stephan Geldenhuys • Jaco Kotze • Pieter Maritz • Mpho Matsaung • Ruhan Meiring • Paul Mente • Vusi Msibi • Sindile Ngcese • Francois Pretorius • Jaco Pretorius • Archie Sehlako • Ricus van der Hoven • Lourens van der Merwe

== See also ==
- Currie Cup
- 2016 Currie Cup Premier Division
- 2016 Currie Cup First Division
- 2016 Currie Cup qualification
- 2016 Under-21 Provincial Championship
- 2016 Under-20 Provincial Championship
