= Yaw Penxe =

South African rugby union player

- Full name: Yaw Osei Penxe
- Born: 3 April 1997 (age 29) Queenstown, South Africa
- Height: 1.81 m (5 ft 11 1/2 in)
- Weight: 82 kg (181 lb; 12 st 13 lb)
- School: Queen's College

Rugby union career
- Position: Winger
- Current team: Sharks / Sharks
Youth career
- 2014: Border Country Districts
- 2015: Border Bulldogs
- 2016–2018: Eastern Province Kings
Senior career
Years	Team	Apps	(Points)
2016	Eastern Province Kings	3	(5)
2017–2020	Southern Kings	46	(75)
2020–	Sharks	12	(10)
2020–	Sharks	21	(30)
- Correct as of 23 July 2022
International career
Years	Team	Apps	(Points)
2017	South Africa Under-20	5	(10)
- Correct as of 23 April 2018

Yaw Osei Penxe (born 3 April 1997) is a South African rugby union player currently playing for the Sharks in the United Rugby Championship. He usually plays as a winger.

== Rugby career ==
At high school level, Penxe represented Border twice at the premier high schools rugby union tournament in South Africa, the Under-18 Craven Week. He played for a Border Country Districts team at the 2014 tournament held in Middelburg, Mpumalanga and – after a spell playing for Kirkham Grammar School in Lancashire in England as part of a schools exchange programme at the end of 2014 – for the Border team at the 2015 event in Stellenbosch.

After matriculating in Queenstown, Penxe moved to Port Elizabeth to join the Eastern Province Kings academy. He was amongst a large contingent of youngsters that were included in the Eastern Province Kings squad for the 2016 Currie Cup qualification series. He was named on the bench for their fourth match of the season against Namibian side the Welwitschias in Windhoek and made his first class debut in the 22nd minute of the match when he replaced the injured Courtney Winnaar. He helped EP Kings win the match 31–18, their first victory of the season. He made another appearance as a replacement in their 10–50 loss to Western Province a fortnight later and was named on the bench for their match against a Golden Lions XV, but wasn't used during their 35–all draw.

After those two Currie Cup appearances, Penxe joined the Eastern Province U19 team for their 2016 Under-19 Provincial Championship campaign. He scored his first try at this level shortly after half-time in the match, helping his side to a 30–17 victory.

== Athletics ==
At school, Penxe also took part in athletics, competing in events such as the 4 × 100 metres relay and the triple jump at high school and provincial level.
