= Alulutho Tshakweni =

South African rugby union player

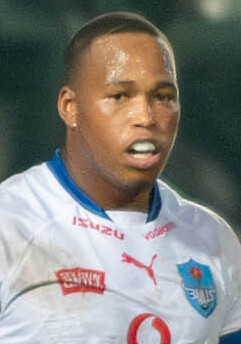
- Born: 26 September 1998 (age 28) East London, South Africa
- Height: 1.76 m (5 ft 9 1/2 in)
- Weight: 101 kg (223 lb; 15 st 13 lb)
- School: Hudson Park High School

Rugby union career
- Position: Prop
- Current team: Cheetahs / Free State Cheetahs
Youth career
- 2015–2016: Border Bulldogs
- 2017: Eastern Province Kings
- 2018: Blue Bulls
Senior career
Years	Team	Apps	(Points)
2018–2020	Southern Kings	14	(0)
2021–2024	Free State Cheetahs	19	(5)
2021–2024	Cheetahs		
2024-	Bulls	0	(0)
- Correct as of 10 July 2022
International career
Years	Team	Apps	(Points)
2018	South Africa Under-20	5	(5)
- Correct as of 26 November 2018

Alulutho Tshakweni (born 26 September 1998) is a South African professional rugby union player who currently plays for the Bulls in the United Rugby Championship. His regular position is prop.

== Rugby career ==
Tshakweni was born in East London and earned a provincial call-up at high school level, playing for the Border Bulldogs at the Under-18 Academy Week in 2015 and at the Under-18 Craven Week in 2016. For the 2017 season, he moved to the Port Elizabeth-based Eastern Province Kings, playing for their Under-19 team in the 2017 Under-19 Provincial Championship.

In 2018, Tshakweni was included in the South Africa Under-20 squad for the 2018 World Rugby Under 20 Championship held in France. He played off the bench in all three of South Africa's matches in Pool C of the competition, featuring in victories over Georgia and Ireland, and scored a try in their final pool match, a 29–46 defeat to the hosts. He was promoted to the starting lineup for their semifinal match against England — a 31–32 defeat that saw the team eliminated from the Cup competition — and their 3rd-place play-off match against New Zealand, helping them to a 40–30 win.

After the Under-20 competition, Tshakweni joined the Pretoria-based Blue Bulls on a short-term deal for the remainder of the 2018 season, and appeared for the Blue Bulls U21 side in the 2018 Under-21 Provincial Championship, scoring a try in his side's 149–13 victory over Eastern Province U21. In November 2018, he returned to Port Elizabeth, where he was drafted into the Southern Kings' Pro14 squad. He was named on the bench for their match against Connacht, and came on as a yellow card replacement in the 35th minute of the match to make his first class debut in a 14–31 defeat.
