= Andrew Kuhn =

- Full name: Andrew Steyn Kuhn
- Born: 7 May 1997 (age 29) Oudtshoorn, South Africa
- Height: 1.80 m (5 ft 11 in)
- Weight: 130 kg (290 lb; 20 st 7 lb)
- School: Hoërskool Outeniqua, George

Rugby union career
- Position: Prop
- Current team: Griquas
Youth career
- 2010–2015: SWD Eagles
- 2016–2017: Free State Cheetahs
Senior career
Years	Team	Apps	(Points)
2017	Free State XV	1	(0)
2017	Free State Cheetahs	4	(0)
2019–2020	Slava Moscow		
2021–	Griquas	5	(0)
- Correct as of 10 July 2022

Andrew Steyn Kuhn (born 7 May 1997) is a South African rugby union player who last played for the Free State Cheetahs in the Currie Cup and the Free State XV in the Rugby Challenge in 2017. His regular position is prop or hooker. He has been playing for Slava Moscow since 2019.
