= Sako Makata =

South African rugby union player

- Full name: Sakoyisa Makata
- Born: 10 September 1998 (age 28)
- Height: 1.85 m (6 ft 1 in)
- Weight: 103 kg (227 lb)
- School: Stirling High School, East London

Rugby union career
- Position: Wing
- Current team: Stormers
Youth career
- 2016: Border Bulldogs
- 2017–2018: Western Province
Senior career
Years	Team	Apps	(Points)
2023–2025	Griquas		
2025–	Western Province		
2025–	Stormers		
- Correct as of 3 September 2025
International career
Years	Team	Apps	(Points)
2019–2023	South Africa Sevens	16	(60)
- Correct as of 3 September 2025
Medal record
Men's rugby sevens
Representing South Africa
Commonwealth Games
Gold medal – first place	2022 Birmingham	Team competition

Sakoyisa Makata (born 10 September 1998) is a South African rugby sevens player for the South Africa national team, where his regular position is a forward.

== Biography ==
Makata attended Stirling High School in East London, where he played rugby for the school's first team, also representing Border at the Under-18 Craven Week in 2016. He joined the SA Rugby Sevens Academy in 2017 and also played for Western Province U19 in the 2017 Under-19 Provincial Championship and for Western Province U21 in the 2018 Under-21 Provincial Championship.

After playing for the Sevens Academy side from 2017 to 2019, Makata was also included in the South Africa national sevens squad prior to the 2018–19 World Rugby Sevens Series. In February 2019, He was named in the Blitzboks squad for the Las Vegas Sevens, and he made his debut in their opening match in that tournament, a 26–0 victory over Japan.

Makata was part of the South African team that won their second Commonwealth Games gold medal in Birmingham in 2022.
