= Stean Pienaar =

South African rugby union player

- Full name: Stean Pienaar
- Born: 13 May 1997 (age 29) Pretoria, South Africa
- Height: 1.79 m (5 ft 10 1/2 in)
- Weight: 97 kg (214 lb; 15 st 4 lb)
- School: Die Hoërskool Menlopark

Rugby union career
- Position: Utility back
- Current team: Lions / Golden Lions
Senior career
Years	Team	Apps	(Points)
2019	Golden Lions XV	3	(15)
2019–2024	Golden Lions	36	(45)
2020–2024	Lions	20	(15)
- Correct as of 18 June 2024

Stean Pienaar (born 13 May 1997) is a South African professional rugby union player for the Golden Lions in the Currie Cup and the Golden Lions XV in the Rugby Challenge. He is a utility back that can play at centre, wing or scrum-half.

He made his Currie Cup debut for the Golden Lions in July 2019, starting their opening match of the 2019 season against the Pumas on the right wing.
