= Zain Davids =

South African rugby union player

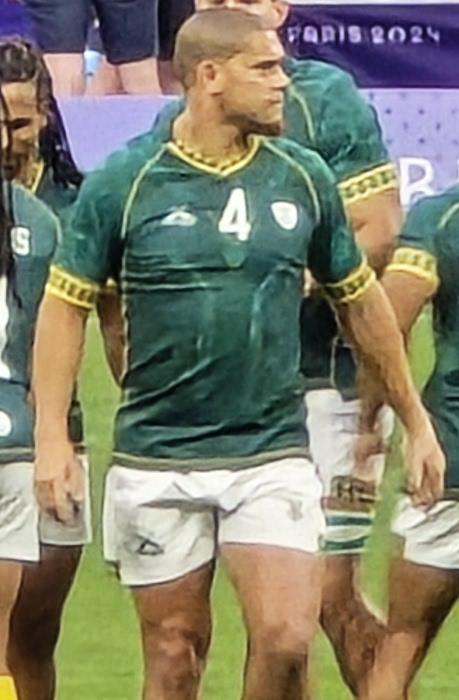
- Davids at the 2024 Olympics quarter-final
- Full name: Mogamat Zain Davids
- Born: 4 May 1997 (age 29) Cape Town, South Africa
- Height: 1.81 m (5 ft 11 in)
- Weight: 104 kg (229 lb)
- School: Rondebosch Boys' High School

Rugby union career
- Position: Flanker / Centre
- Current team: South Africa Sevens
Youth career
- 2013–2016: Western Province
Senior career
Years	Team	Apps	(Points)
2020	Sharks	0	(0)
2020–2021	Sharks (Currie Cup)	1	(0)
- Correct as of 28 April 2021
International career
Years	Team	Apps	(Points)
2015	South Africa Schools 'A'	2	(5)
2015	South Africa Schools	1	(0)
2016	South Africa Under-20	8	(15)
2017–present	South Africa Sevens	199	(185)
- Correct as of 29 April 2023
Medal record
Men's rugby sevens
Representing South Africa
Olympic Games
Bronze medal – third place	2024 Paris	Team competition
Commonwealth Games
Gold medal – first place	2022 Birmingham	Team competition
Africa Men's Sevens
Silver medal – second place	2024 Mauritius	Team competition

Mogamat Zaïn Davids (born 4 May 1997) is a South African rugby union player, that competes in both the 15-man and sevens variants of the game. He is currently contracted by the South African Rugby Union to play for the South Africa Sevens national team. His regular position is in the loose-forward position, but he also played as a centre at schoolboy level.

== Rugby career ==
=== 2013–2015: Schoolboy rugby ===
Davids was born and grew up in Cape Town. He attended and played first team rugby for Rondebosch Boys' High School in the city, and earned provincial colours on several occasions representing Western Province at youth tournaments. In 2013, he was included in their squad for the Under-16 Grant Khomo Week held in Vanderbijlpark, scoring one try in their 50–12 victory over the Leopards. In 2014, he was named in the Western Province squad for South Africa's premier schools rugby union competition, the Under-18 Craven Week, held in Middelburg. He started all three of their matches and again scored one try, in a match against the Free State.

He represented Western Province at the same tournaments a year later, as the team hosted the event held in Stellenbosch. Davids helped the team to reach the main match in the tournament, where they beat their Eastern Province counterparts 95–0 to become the unofficial champions. After the tournament, Davids was included in a South Africa Schools 'A' squad for the Under-18 International Series held in August 2015. He scored a try in his side's 29–14 victory over Italy in their first match and also started in their 8–33 defeat to England four days later. Davids was promoted to the senior South Africa Schools team following injuries to Ruben van Heerden and Cobus Wiese, and he came on as a replacement in their final match of the series, a 23–16 victory over England.

=== 2016: South Africa Under-20 and Western Province Under-19 ===
After high school, Davids joined Western Province's academy, the Western Province Rugby Institute. In March 2016, he was included in a South Africa Under-20 training squad, and made the cut for a reduced provisional squad a week later. On 10 May 2016, he was included in the final South Africa Under-20 squad for the 2016 World Rugby Under 20 Championship tournament to be held in Manchester in England. He started all three of their matches in Pool C of the competition; after scoring two tries in their opening match, a 59–19 victory over Japan, he was on the losing side in the second match, as Argentina won the match 19–13. He scored another try in their final match, a 40–31 victory over France, try that ensured South Africa qualified for the semi-finals as the best runner-up. Davids also started their semi-final against hosts England, but could not prevent them from suffering a 17–39 loss and he was on the losing side again in the third-place play-off as South Africa lost to Argentina for the second time in the tournament, ending in fourth position overall. Davids' three tries ensured he finished the tournament as South Africa's top try-scoring forward and joint-top try scorer alongside backs Manie Libbok and Edwill van der Merwe.

Upon Davids' return to South Africa, he was named in the Western Province U19 squad that competed in the 2016 Under-19 Provincial Championship. He played in six of their twelve matches during the regular season, scoring one try in their match against the Leopards U19 team en route to finishing top of the log, with ten wins and just two defeats. Davids played off the bench in their 30–15 semi-final victory over Free State U19 in the semi-final and started in the final, where his team suffered a heavy defeat, losing 19–60 to Golden Lions U19. At the end of the season, Davids won the BrightRock U21 Bounce Player of the Year award at Western Province's end-of-year awards ceremony.

=== 2016–present: Sevens ===
In November 2016, Davids was included in a South Africa Sevens Academy squad; after being included in the squad for a local tournament, he earned a place in the squad that played at an International Invitational tournament that was held as part of the 2016 Dubai Sevens, helping the team reach the final of the tournament.

In January 2017, Davids was included in the senior South Africa Sevens squad for the 2017 Wellington Sevens tournament as a replacement for the injured former captain Kyle Brown.

In 2022, He was part of the South African team that won their second Commonwealth Games gold medal in Birmingham.

He competed for South Africa at the 2024 Summer Olympics in Paris. They defeated Australia to win the bronze medal final.
