= Heino Bezuidenhout =

South African rugby union player

- Born: 13 March 1997 (age 29) Roodepoort, Gauteng, South Africa
- Height: 1.88 m (6 ft 2 in)
- Weight: 95 kg (209 lb; 14 st 13 lb)
- School: HTS Daniel Pienaar THS, Uitenhage

Rugby union career
- Position: Centre
Youth career
- 2010–2015: Eastern Province Kings
- 2016–2018: Blue Bulls
- Correct as of 12 May 2018
International career
| Years | Team | Apps | (Points) |
| 2014–2015 | South Africa Schools | | |
| 2018–present | South Africa Sevens | 21 | (15) |
- Correct as of 11 June 2018
Medal record
Boy's rugby sevens
Representing South Africa
Commonwealth Youth Games
| Gold medal – first place | 2015 Apia | Team competition |

Heino Bezuidenhout (born 13 March 1997) is a South African rugby union player. His regular position is outside centre in fifteens rugby and as a forward in sevens rugby.

== Career ==
In 2015, he was named captain of the South Africa Rugby Sevens for the 2015 Commonwealth Youth Games.

He represented the Blue Bulls in the Under-19 and Under-21 Provincial Championships in 2016. The following year, he was selected in the UP Tuks Varsity Cup squad.

He made his debut for the South Africa Sevens team at the 2018 Hong Kong Sevens, where South Africa finished third.
