= Andrew Evans (rugby union) =

South African rugby union player

- Full name: Andrew John Evans
- Born: 31 March 1997 (age 29) Durban, South Africa
- Height: 2.04 m (6 ft 8 1/2 in)
- Weight: 108 kg (238 lb; 17 st 0 lb)

Rugby union career
- Position: Lock
- Current team: Zimbabwe Goshawks
Youth career
- 2015–2018: Sharks
Senior career
Years	Team	Apps	(Points)
2018–2019	Sharks XV	14	(0)
2018–2020	Sharks (Currie Cup)	3	(0)
2020	Sharks	0	(0)
2021–2022	CSKA Moscow	?	(?)
2022–	Zimbabwe Goshawks	0	(0)
- Correct as of 28 March 2022

Andrew John Evans (born 31 March 1997) is a South African rugby union player for the Sharks in Super Rugby and the Sharks XV in the Rugby Challenge. His regular position is lock.
