= Madosh Tambwe =

South African rugby player (born 1997)

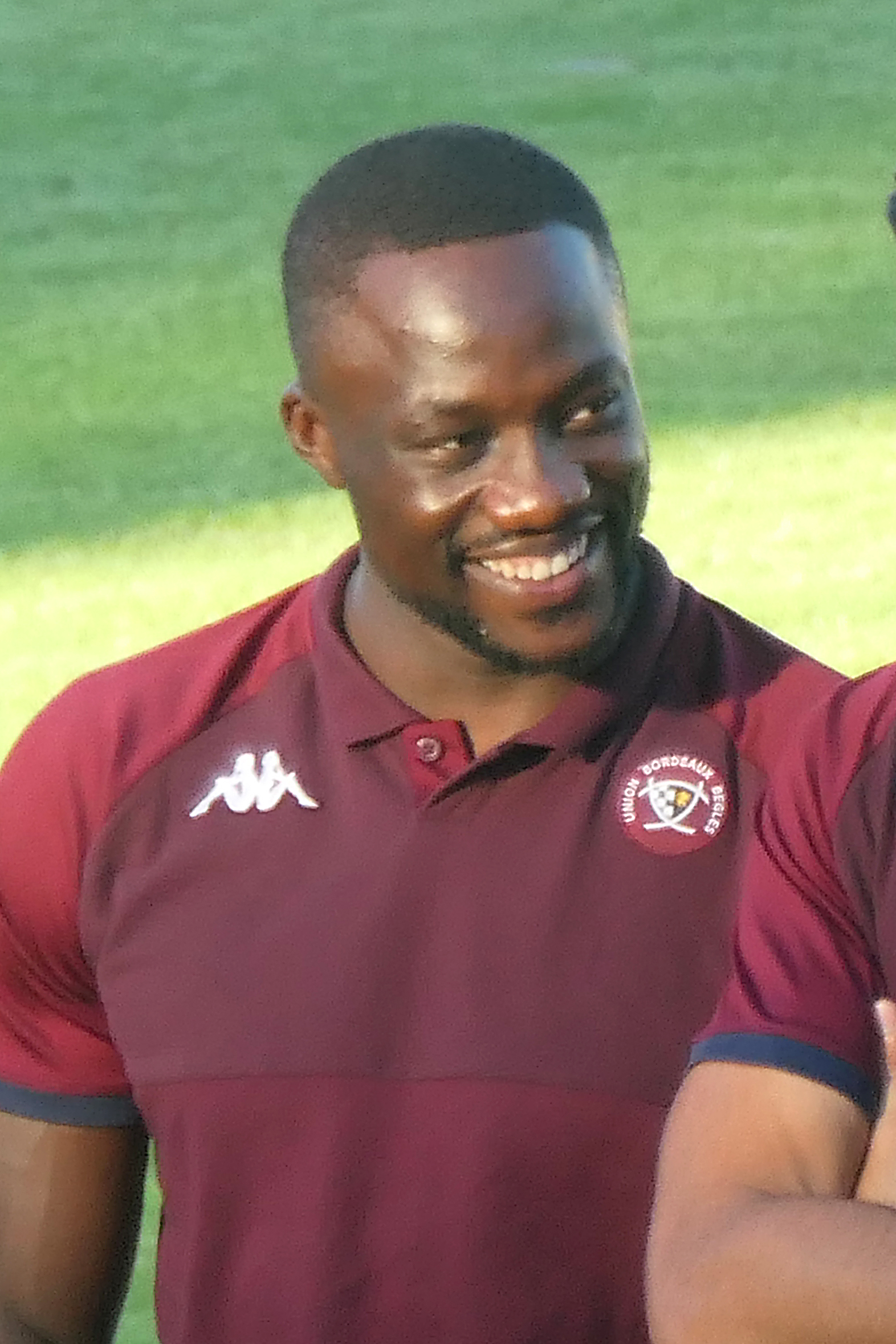
- Tambwe with Bordeaux Bègles in 2022
- Full name: Madosha Michael Tambwe
- Born: 12 May 1997 (age 29) Kinshasa, Zaire
- Height: 1.86 m (6 ft 1 in)
- Weight: 92 kg (203 lb; 14 st 7 lb)
- School: Parktown Boys' High School, Johannesburg

Rugby union career
- Position: Winger
- Current team: Montpellier
Youth career
- 2015–2018: Golden Lions
Senior career
Years	Team	Apps	(Points)
2017–2018	Lions	13	(45)
2017–2019	Golden Lions XV	13	(55)
2017–2019	Golden Lions	16	(50)
2020	Sharks	7	(25)
2020	Sharks (Currie Cup)	2	(0)
2021–2022	Bulls	27	(60)
2021–2022	Blue Bulls	9	(20)
2022–2024	Bordeaux Bègles	35	(95)
2024–	Montpellier	12	(20)
- Correct as of 19 December 2024

Madosha Michael Tambwe (born 12 May 1997) is a South African rugby union player for Montpellier. He usually plays as a winger.

== Early life ==
Tambwe was born in Kinshasa, Zaire, a few days before the end of the First Congo War that resulted in the country's name being changed to the Democratic Republic of the Congo.

He grew up in Johannesburg in South Africa, where he attended and played first team rugby for Parktown Boys' High School.

== Career ==
=== Golden Lions ===
In 2015, he was called up to the Golden Lions squad for South Africa's premier high school rugby union tournament, the Under-18 Craven Week. He started two of their matches, and scored two tries in their final match of the competition, a 47–29 victory over the Griffons.

He was included in the Golden Lions U19 squad for the 2016 Under-19 Provincial Championship. Despite starting just four of his side's fourteen matches and playing off the bench on seven occasions, Tambwe scored 16 tries to finish as the competition's top try scorer. Twelve of his tries came during the regular season – four in their match against defending champions Eastern Province U19 in a 59–5 win, two each in matches against Sharks U19 and Leopards U19 and further tries in matches against Free State U19, Eastern Province, Western Province U19 and the Sharks – to help the Golden Lions to third spot on the log and a semi-final berth. He scored his thirteenth try of the season in a 34–24 victory over trans-Jukskei rivals the Blue Bulls U19s in the semi-final and rounded off his season with a hat-trick in the final against Western Province, as his side won 60–19 to be crowned champions of the competition.

=== Lions ===
At the start of 2017, Tambwe was included in the Lions squad for the 2017 Super Rugby season, and he was named in the starting line-up of their Round Four match against Australian side the Reds, playing the entire 80 minutes of a 44–14 victory. Tambwe scored his first points in Round Five against the Kings with two tries. In the 2018 Super Rugby season Tambwe scored four tries in one game against the Stormers in Round Eight, getting a hat-trick within just thirteen minutes, the quickest hat-trick in Super Rugby history. On 13 July 2019, Tambwe scored four tries against the Griquas at Ellis Park in round one of the 2019 Currie Cup Premier Division.

=== Sharks ===
At the beginning of the 2020 Super Rugby season, Tambwe signed for the Cell C Sharks and has featured regularly since in both the original Super Rugby and the South African only version, Super Rugby Unlocked.

=== Bulls ===
On the 19th of February 2021, the Vodacom Blue Bulls announced that Tambwe had signed for the side from the Sharks. On the 22nd of June 2022, Tambwe had announced his departure from the Vodacom Blue Bulls after a year's tenure.

=== Bordeaux Bègles ===
On 26 July 2022, Bordeaux Bègles announced that Tambwe would join the club for the upcoming season. He made his Top 14 debut on 4 September 2022 against Toulouse, scoring two tries in the first half of the match.

== Honours ==
=== Bulls ===
- Currie Cup: 2021
- Pro14 Rainbow Cup runner-up 2021
- United Rugby Championship runner-up: 2021-22
