= Eddie Fouché =

South African rugby union player

- Full name: Eduard Fouché
- Born: 4 September 1997 (age 29) Witbank, South Africa
- Height: 1.85 m (6 ft 1 in)
- Weight: 94 kg (207 lb)
- School: Afrikaanse Hoër Seunskool

Rugby union career
- Position: Fly-half / Centre
- Current team: Griquas
Senior career
Years	Team	Apps	(Points)
2017–2019	Golden Lions XV	11	(11)
2019	Golden Lions	1	(0)
2019	Lions	0	(0)
2020–2022	Pumas	25	(229)
2021–2022	Lions	2	(0)
2023–	Griquas		
- Correct as of 16 September 2022
International career
Years	Team	Apps	(Points)
2015	South Africa Schools 'A'	3	(8)
- Correct as of 10 August 2019

Eduard Fouché (born 4 September 1997) is a South African rugby union player for the Lions in Super Rugby, the Golden Lions in the Currie Cup and the Golden Lions XV in the Rugby Challenge. His regular position is fly-half or centre.

He made his Currie Cup debut for the Golden Lions in August 2019, starting their Round Five match of the 2019 season against the Blue Bulls.
