= Stedman Gans =

South African rugby union player

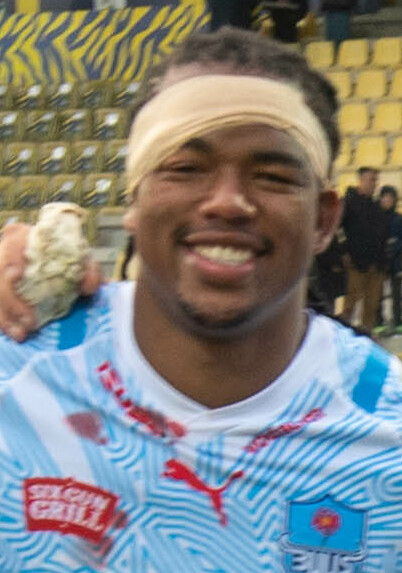
- Full name: Stedman-Ghee Rivett Gans
- Born: 19 March 1997 (age 29) Vredenburg, South Africa
- Height: 1.80 m (5 ft 11 in)
- Weight: 85 kg (13 st 5 lb; 187 lb)
- School: Hoërskool Waterkloof
- University: University of Pretoria

Rugby union career
- Position: Centre / Winger
- Current team: Bulls / Blue Bulls
Youth career
- 2013–2016: Blue Bulls
Senior career
Years	Team	Apps	(Points)
2017–present	Blue Bulls	22	(10)
2020–	Bulls	45	(50)
- Correct as of 23 July 2022
International career
Years	Team	Apps	(Points)
2015	South Africa Schools	3	(10)
2016–2017	South Africa Under-20	5	(0)
2017–present	South Africa Sevens	44	(60)
- Correct as of 15 November 2018

Stedman-Ghee Rivett Gans (born 19 March 1997) is a South African rugby sevens player for the South Africa national team and a rugby union player for the Bulls in the United Rugby Championship and the Blue Bulls in the Currie Cup. He usually plays as a centre or a winger.

== Rugby career ==
=== 2013–2015: Schoolboy rugby ===
Gans was born in Vredenburg. He attended primary school in the town, before moving to Pretoria to attend Hoërskool Waterkloof. He earned provincial colours by representing the Blue Bulls at high school tournaments between 2013 and 2015. In 2013, he played for them at the Under-16 Grant Khomo Week held in Vanderbijlpark, before representing them at South Africa's premier high schools competition, the Under-18 Craven Week in both 2014 and 2015. He scored one try in the 2014 event held in Middelburg, in a 21–10 victory over the Golden Lions, and repeated the feat in the 2015 event in Stellenbosch, scoring a try against Western Province in a 13–20 defeat. He caught the eye of the national selectors and was named in the 2015 South Africa Schools squad for the Under-18 International Series. He scored two tries in their match against Wales in the first match of the series, helping his team to a 42–11 victory, and also helped them to wins over France and England.

=== 2016: UP Tuks, South Africa Under-20 and Blue Bulls Under-19 ===
At the start of 2016, Gans made three appearances for UP Tuks in the Varsity Cup competition, before joining up with the South Africa Under-20 squad for the 2016 World Rugby Under 20 Championship held in Manchester. He made just one appearance in their final match of the competition, starting on the right wing in a 19–49 defeat to Argentina in the third-place play-off match.

He returned to domestic action, starting six matches for the Blue Bulls U19 team in the 2016 Under-19 Provincial Championship. After scoring tries in matches against Golden Lions U19," Sharks U19 and Eastern Province U19, he scored two tries in victories over Leopards U19 and Western Province U19 to finish the competition as his team's joint-top try scorer. He helped his team finish second on the log to qualify for the play-offs, but could not prevent his side being eliminated at the semi-final stage, losing 24–34 to the Golden Lions.

=== 2017: South Africa Sevens ===
Gans joined the South Africa Sevens' Academy at the end of 2016, played for the team at the 2016 Dubai Sevens. In February 2017, he was named as an official reserve for the national sevens team for the 2017 USA Sevens tournament, and a week later, an injury to Justin Geduld saw him promoted to the main squad for the 2017 Canada Sevens in Vancouver.

He was again named in a South Africa Under-20 training squad for 2017.

=== 2018–2021: South Africa Sevens ===
Gans continued representing the South Africa national rugby sevens team (the Blitzboks) in the World Rugby Sevens Series, establishing himself as a regular member of the squad during the 2018 and 2019 seasons.

In January 2020, Gans was appointed captain of the Blitzboks for the Hamilton and Sydney legs of the World Rugby Sevens Series, replacing the injured Siviwe Soyizwapi. He subsequently captained South Africa to victory at the 2020 Los Angeles Sevens and was named Springbok Sevens Player of the Year for 2020.

Despite sustaining a serious injury earlier in 2021, Gans recovered to represent South Africa at the 2020 Summer Olympics, held in Tokyo in July 2021. South Africa finished fifth in the men's rugby sevens tournament.

=== 2019–present: Blue Bulls and Bulls ===
Gans made three appearances for the Blue Bulls during the 2019 Currie Cup before establishing himself in the Bulls' senior team in 2020. Under head coach Jake White, he was selected at outside centre during the 2020 Super Rugby Unlocked competition, forming a midfield partnership with Cornal Hendricks. The Bulls went on to win the competition.

He also featured in the Blue Bulls' successful 2020-21 Currie Cup campaign, although a hamstring injury prevented him from participating in the final against the Sharks.

Following his involvement in international sevens, Gans returned to fifteen-a-side rugby with the Bulls, competing in the United Rugby Championship following the South African franchises' entry into the competition in 2021. He continued to play primarily at centre, while also providing cover across the backline. His appearances during subsequent seasons were affected by injuries.

On 16 May 2026, Gans made his 100th appearance for the Bulls in their United Rugby Championship match against Benetton at Loftus Versfeld. He also appeared as a replacement in the 2025-26 United Rugby Championship final against Leinster on 19 June 2026, which the Bulls lost 36-7.

Gans remained with the Bulls for the 2026–27 United Rugby Championship season, starting at outside centre in their 57-15 victory over the Lions on 10 October 2026.

== Honours ==
- Springbok Sevens Player of the Year 2020
- Super Rugby Unlocked 2020
