= Ernst van Rhyn =

South African rugby union player

- Born: 19 September 1997 (age 29) Bellville, South Africa
- Height: 1.94 m (6 ft 4 1/2 in)
- Weight: 115 kg (254 lb; 18 st 2 lb)
- School: Paarl Gimnasium
- University: University of Stellenbosch

Rugby union career
- Position: Lock / Flank
- Current team: Sale Sharks
Youth career
- 2015–2018: Western Province
Senior career
Years	Team	Apps	(Points)
2018–present	Western Province	41	(15)
2019–2023	Stormers	37	(5)
2023–	Sale Sharks		
- Correct as of 23 July 2022
International career
Years	Team	Apps	(Points)
2015	South Africa Schools	3	(0)
2016–2017	South Africa Under-20	9	(0)
- Correct as of 25 August 2018

Ernst van Rhyn (born 19 September 1997) is a South African rugby union player for the Sale Sharks in premiership rugby and Western Province in the Currie Cup and the Rugby Challenge. He can play as a lock or a flank.

On 16 September 2025, van Rhyn extended his contract with the Sale Sharks until June 2029.

On 23 September 2025, van Rhyn was named captain of the Sale Sharks for the 2025/26 Gallagher Prem season.
