= Nama Xaba =

South African rugby union player

- Full name: Kuyenzeka Kwenama Praisegod Xaba
- Born: 26 July 1997 (age 29) Vryheid, KwaZulu-Natal, South Africa
- Height: 1.85 m (6 ft 1 in)
- Weight: 105 kg (231 lb)
- School: Glenwood High School
- University: University of Cape Town

Rugby union career
- Position: Flanker
- Current team: Stormers / Western Province
Senior career
| Years | Team | Apps | (Points) |
| 2018–2024 | Western Province | 24 | (15) |
| 2020–2024 | Stormers | 20 | (15) |
| 2024- | Bulls | 0 | (0) |
- Correct as of 23 July 2022
International career
| Years | Team | Apps | (Points) |
| 2017 | South Africa Under-20 | 1 | (0) |

Kuyenzeka Kwenama Praisegod Xaba (born 26 July 1997) is a South African rugby union player for the Bulls in United Rugby Championship and Blue Bulls in the Currie Cup and the Rugby Challenge.

His regular position is flanker. Xaba, attended Glenwood High School in Durban where he was the head prefect and rugby captain of 1st team in 2015. He is an alumnus of the University of Cape Town (UCT), having graduated with a BSC in Geomatics. Nama played provincial representative rugby for KZN at Under 12 inter-provincial level, the Under-13 Craven Week, Under-16 Grant Khomo week, Academy week and at the Kearsney College Easter Festival in 2015.

He also captained the KZN Grant Khomo team. He played for KZN Craven Week in 2015 as vice-captain, and last year represented WP at U19 level. He was voted WP 2016 – U19 Most Promising Player. In 2019, he was the Varsity Cup Captain for UCT's Ikey Tigers.

He made his Currie Cup debut for Western Province in August 2019, coming on as a replacement in their match against the Pumas in Round Five of the 2019 season.
