= Jan-Louis la Grange =

South African rugby union player (born 1997)

- Born: 19 March 1997 (age 29) Paarl, South Africa
- Height: 1.86 m (6 ft 1 in)
- Weight: 88 kg (194 lb; 13 st 12 lb)
- School: Paarl Boys' High School

Rugby union career
- Position: Centre
- Current team: Griquas
Youth career
- 2016–2018: Golden Lions
Senior career
Years	Team	Apps	(Points)
2017–2019	Golden Lions XV	18	(30)
2017–2019	Golden Lions	10	(0)
2020–2021	Ciencias Sevilla	9	(10)
2022–	Griquas	0	(0)
- Correct as of 10 July 2022

Jan-Louis la Grange (born 19 March 1997) is a South African rugby union player for the Lions in Super Rugby, the Golden Lions in the Currie Cup and the Golden Lions XV in the Rugby Challenge. His regular position is centre or wing.
