= Ilunga Mukendi =

South African rugby union player

- Born: 7 May 1997 (age 29) Lubumbashi, Zaire
- Height: 1.84 m (6 ft 1/2 in)
- Weight: 88 kg (194 lb; 13 st 12 lb)
- School: Glenwood High School
- University: University of KwaZulu-Natal

Rugby union career
- Position: Wing
- Current team: Lions / Golden Lions
Youth career
- 2013–2018: Sharks
Senior career
Years	Team	Apps	(Points)
2017–2019	Sharks XV	7	(20)
2017	Sharks (Currie Cup)	1	(0)
2022–	Golden Lions	5	(0)
2022–	Lions		
- Correct as of 21 April 2023

Ilunga Mukendi (born 7 May 1997) is a Zaire-born South African rugby union player for the Sharks in the Currie Cup and the Sharks XV in the Rugby Challenge. His regular position is on the wing.
