= Reinhard Nothnagel =

South African rugby union player

- Full name: Reinhard Paul Nothnagel
- Born: 25 September 1997 (age 29) Krugersdorp, South Africa
- Height: 2.02 m (6 ft 7 1/2 in)
- Weight: 115 kg (254 lb; 18 st 2 lb)
- School: Monument High School

Rugby union career
- Position: Lock
- Current team: Lions / Golden Lions
Youth career
- 2013–2018: Golden Lions
Senior career
| Years | Team | Apps | (Points) |
| 2018–2019 | Golden Lions XV | 8 | (0) |
| 2018–present | Golden Lions | 24 | (0) |
| 2019–present | Lions | 73 | (5) |
- Correct as of 26 October 2026
International career
| Years | Team | Apps | (Points) |
| 2015 | South Africa Schools A | 3 | (0) |
| 2017 | South Africa Under-20 | 3 | (0) |
- Correct as of 1 September 2018

Reinhard Paul Nothnagel (born 25 September 1997) is a South African rugby union player for the Lions in Super Rugby, the Golden Lions in the Currie Cup and the Golden Lions XV in the Rugby Challenge. His regular position is lock. He is happily married to Chane Nothnagel as of 29 June 2024.
