= David Meihuizen =

South African rugby union player

- Full name: David Steven Meihuizen
- Born: 13 November 1997 (age 29) Cape Town, South Africa
- Height: 2.06 m (6 ft 9 in)
- Weight: 127 kg (280 lb)
- School: Paarl Boys' High School

Rugby union career
- Position: Lock
Senior career
Years	Team	Apps	(Points)
2018–2022	Western Province	23	(0)
2019–2022	Stormers	9	(0)
- Correct as of 15 March 2022

David Steven Meihuizen (born 13 November 1997) is a former South African rugby union player for the Stormers in Super Rugby and Western Province in the Currie Cup and the Rugby Challenge. His regular position was the lock.

He made his Super Rugby debut for the Stormers in their match against the Sunwolves in June 2019, coming on as a replacement lock. He is currently studying at the University of Cape Town and has a 3-year contract with Western Province which started in 2018. He has been forced to retire due to a concussion caused during a game in the 2022 season.
