= Marco Labuschagné =

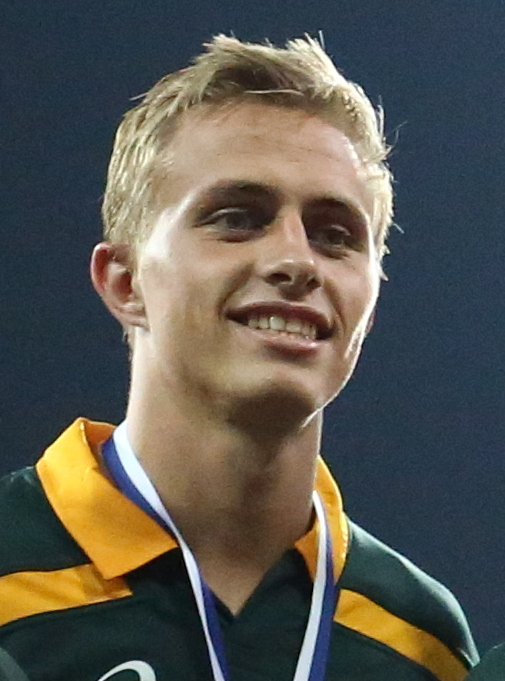
- Full name: Markus Marthinus Johannes Labuschagné
- Born: 30 January 1998 (age 28) Pretoria, South Africa
- Height: 1.86 m (6 ft 1 in)
- Weight: 90 kg (200 lb; 14 st 2 lb)
- School: Bethlehem Voortrekker High School

Rugby union career
- Position: Fullback
- Current team: Western Province
Youth career
- 2014–2016: Griffons
- 2017–2019: Western Province
- Correct as of 3 September 2018
International career
Years	Team	Apps	(Points)
2017–2019	South Africa Sevens	8	(5)
- Correct as of 3 September 2018

Markus Marthinus Johannes Labuschagné (born 30 January 1998) is a South African rugby sevens player for the South Africa national team and a rugby union player for Western Province U21 in the Under-21 Provincial Championship. His regular position is fullback.
