= Boeta Hamman =

South African rugby union player

- Full name: Christo Lategan Hamman
- Born: 31 August 1997 (age 29) Stilbaai, South Africa
- Height: 1.84 m (6 ft 1/2 in)
- Weight: 89 kg (196 lb; 14 st 0 lb)
- School: Hoër Landbouskool Oakdale, Riversdale
- University: University of Pretoria

Rugby union career
- Position: Fly-half
Youth career
- 2010–2015: SWD Eagles
- 2016–2018: Blue Bulls
Senior career
Years	Team	Apps	(Points)
2018	Blue Bulls XV	2	(0)
2018	Bulls	1	(0)
- Correct as of 15 July 2018

Christo Lategan 'Boeta' Hamman (born 31 August 1997) is a South African rugby union player who last played for the Bulls in Super Rugby, the Blue Bulls in the Currie Cup and the Blue Bulls XV in the Rugby Challenge. His regular position is fly-half.

== Rugby career ==
Hamman was born in Stilbaai and attended Hoër Landbouskool Oakdale in nearby Riversdale. He represented the SWD Eagles at various age groups throughout his school career; he played for them at the Under-13 Craven Week in 2010, the Under-16 Grant Khomo Week in 2013 and the Under-18 Craven Week in 2014 and 2015.

After school, Hamman moved to Pretoria to join the Blue Bulls academy, and played for them at Under-19 level in 2016 and Under-21 level in 2017, as well as representing local university side UP Tuks in the Varsity Cup competition.

He made his first class debut in the 2018 Rugby Challenge, coming on as a replacement in their opening match of the season against the Pumas, and made his first start a week later against Namibian side the Welwitschias. In July 2018, he was included in the Bulls squad for their final match of the 2018 Super Rugby season against trans-Jukskei rivals the Lions, and he made his Super Rugby debut by coming on as a second half replacement.
