= Len Massyn =

South African rugby union player

- Full name: Willem Leon Massyn
- Born: 21 May 1997 (age 29) Pretoria, South Africa
- Height: 1.95 m (6 ft 5 in)
- Weight: 106 kg (234 lb; 16 st 10 lb)
- School: Monument High School

Rugby union career
- Position: Flanker / Number 8
- Current team: Ealing Trailfinders
Youth career
- 2013–2018: Golden Lions
Senior career
| Years | Team | Apps | (Points) |
| 2017–2021 | Golden Lions | 24 | (10) |
| 2018–2021 | Lions | 16 | (0) |
| 2018–2019 | Golden Lions XV | 10 | (0) |
| 2021– | Ealing Trailfinders | | |
- Correct as of 8 September 2021
International career
| Years | Team | Apps | (Points) |
| 2017 | South Africa Under-20 | 3 | (0) |
- Correct as of 21 May 2018

Willem Leon Massyn (born 21 May 1997) is a South African rugby union player for the Lions in Super Rugby, the Golden Lions in the Currie Cup and the Golden Lions XV in the Rugby Challenge. In 2013 and 2014 he represented the Hoerskool Monument Lions in the Grant Khomo Week and Craven Week. His regular position is flanker or number eight.
