= HP van Schoor =

South African rugby union player

- Full name: Hendrik Petrus van Schoor
- Born: 23 October 1997 (age 29) Worcester, South Africa
- Height: 1.80 m (5 ft 11 in)
- Weight: 106 kg (234 lb; 16 st 10 lb)
- School: Hoër Landbouskool Oakdale, Riversdale

Rugby union career
- Position: Hooker
- Current team: Boland Cavaliers
Youth career
- 2013–2015: SWD Eagles
- 2016–2018: Golden Lions
Senior career
Years	Team	Apps	(Points)
2017–2018	Golden Lions XV	5	(0)
2018	Golden Lions	1	(0)
2019–2021	Pumas	10	(15)
2021–2022	Lokomotiv Penza	7	(0)
2022	Western Province	3	(0)
2023–2024	Griffons	13	(25)
2024–	Boland Cavaliers	0	(0)
- Correct as of 14 July 2024

Hendrik Petrus van Schoor (born 23 October 1997) is a South African rugby union player for the Boland Cavaliers. His regular position is hooker.
