= Josh Allderman =

South African rugby union player

- Full name: Joshua Allderman
- Born: 17 January 1997 (age 29) Cape Town, South Africa
- Height: 1.73 m (5 ft 8 in)
- Weight: 77 kg (170 lb)
- School: Selborne College

Rugby union career
- Position: Scrum-half
Youth career
- 2014–2015: Border Bulldogs
- 2016: Blue Bulls
Senior career
Years	Team	Apps	(Points)
2018	Blue Bulls XV	1	(0)
2019–2020	Southern Kings	8	(0)
2021	Eastern Province Elephants	2	(8)
- Correct as of 29 March 2022

Joshua Allderman (born 17 January 1997) is a South African rugby union player for the Eastern Province Elephants in the Currie Cup. His regular position is scrum-half.

Allderman was born in Cape Town, finished his schooling at Selborne College in East London, where he also played first team rugby and earned a call-up to the Border Bulldogs Under-18 Academy Week squad in 2014 and Craven Week squad in 2015.

Allderman moved to Pretoria to join the Blue Bulls academy and represented them at youth level from 2016 to 2018. In 2018, he made his first class debut, coming on as a replacement in the Blue Bulls XV's Rugby Challenge match against the Welwitschias in a 47–31 victory. A second appearance followed in their quarter-final defeat to the Pumas in Mbombela.

Allderman returned to the Eastern Cape in 2019, to join Pro14 franchise the Southern Kings. He was named on the bench for their season-opener against Cardiff Blues, but failed to make an appearance. However, he did play off the bench in their next two matches against Munster and Ulster before starting his first match in a 30–36 defeat to Benetton in Treviso.
