= Johan Grobbelaar =

South African rugby union player

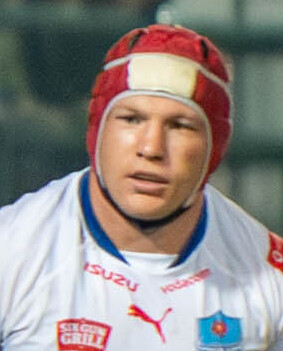
- Full name: Cornelis Johannes Grobbelaar
- Born: 30 December 1997 (age 28) Paarl, South Africa
- Height: 1.82 m (5 ft 11 1/2 in)
- Weight: 103 kg (227 lb; 16 st 3 lb)
- School: Paarl Gymnasium

Rugby union career
- Position: Hooker
- Current team: Bulls / Blue Bulls
Youth career
- 2015: Western Province
- 2016–2018: Blue Bulls
Senior career
Years	Team	Apps	(Points)
2017–present	Blue Bulls	24	(40)
2018	Blue Bulls XV	5	(15)
2018–present	Bulls	72	(125)
- Correct as of 23 July 2022
International career
Years	Team	Apps	(Points)
2015	South Africa Schools	3	(5)
2017	South Africa Under-20	5	(20)
2024-present	South Africa	8	(0)
- Correct as of 29 November 2025

Cornelis Johannes Grobbelaar (born 30 December 1997) is a South African rugby union player for the Bulls in the United Rugby Championship and the Blue Bulls in the Currie Cup. His regular position is hooker.

== Rugby career ==
Grobbelaar was born and grew up in Paarl. He attended and played rugby for Paarl Gymnasium and was selected for the Western Province squad for the 2015 Under-18 Craven Week tournament. His team won the main match at the tournament held in Stellenbosch, beating Eastern Province 95–0 in the final. After the Craven Week tournament, Grobbelaar was selected for the South Africa Schools squad that participated in the 2015 Under-18 International Series. He started all three of their matches; he scored a try in their 42–11 win over Wales in their first match and helped his team to wins over France and England in the other two.

After school, he moved to Pretoria to join the Blue Bulls academy. He played for them at Under-19 level in 2016, and the following year he was selected in the South Africa Under-20 squad for the 2017 World Rugby Under 20 Championship. He started all five matches at the tournament, helping his side to a 23–23 draw against France, a 38–14 victory over Georgia and a 72–14 win over Argentina (a match in which Grobbelaar scored two of South Africa's eleven tries) as South Africa topped Pool C to qualify for the semi-finals. A 22–24 defeat to England in the semi-finals ended their hopes of winning the competition, but they bounced back in the third-place play-off to beat France 37–15, with Grobbelaar scoring a further two tries.

He made his domestic first class debut shortly after his return to South Africa, coming on as a replacement in the Blue Bulls' 54–22 victory over the Golden Lions in their 2017 Currie Cup Premier Division Round Three match. He became a regular on the Blue Bulls' replacement bench during the season, making a total of ten appearances. He also scored three tries during the season, in matches against Western Province, the Golden Lions and the Free State Cheetahs.

In 2018, Grobbelaar was included in the Bulls squad for their final match of the 2018 Super Rugby season against trans-Jukskei rivals the Lions, and he made his Super Rugby debut by coming on as a second half replacement.

== Honours ==
- Super Rugby Unlocked winner 2020
- Currie Cup winner 2020–21
- Pro14 Rainbow Cup runner-up 2021
- United Rugby Championship runner-up 2021–22
- Selected in the United Rugby Championship "Dream Team" for the 2021–22 season.
- Bulls URC Players' Player of the Year 2022

== Statistics ==
=== Test match record ===
As of 27 September 2026

Opponent	P	W	D	L	Try	Pts	%Won
Argentina	1	1	0	0	0	0	100
Australia	2	1	0	1	1	5	50
France	1	1	0	0	0	0	100
Ireland	1	1	0	0	0	0	100
Italy	1	1	0	0	0	0	100
Japan	1	1	0	0	0	0	100
Portugal	1	1	0	0	0	0	100
Scotland	1	1	0	0	0	0	100
Wales	2	2	0	0	0	0	100
Total	11	10	0	1	1	5	90.91

=== International tries ===
As of 27 September 2026

Try	Opposing team	Location	Venue	Competition	Date	Result	Score
1	Australia	Perth, Australia	Perth Stadium	2026 test	27 September 2026	Loss	42–38
