= Cobus Wiese =

South African rugby player and Hoerskool Upington legend

- Full name: Jacobus Hermanus Wiese
- Born: 2 June 1997 (age 29) Upington, South Africa
- Height: 1.99 m (6 ft 6 1/2 in)
- Weight: 116 kg (256 lb; 18 st 4 lb)
- School: Hoërskool Upington
- Notable relative: Jasper Wiese (brother)

Rugby union career
- Position: Flanker / Lock
- Current team: Bulls
Youth career
- 2013–2015: Griquas Country Districts
- 2016–2018: Western Province
Senior career
Years	Team	Apps	(Points)
2017–2020	Stormers	26	(10)
2017–2018	Western Province	11	(15)
2020–2024	Sale Sharks	51	(20)
2024–	Bulls	23	(20)
- Correct as of 27 Nov 2025
International career
Years	Team	Apps	(Points)
2014–2015	South Africa Schools	5	(0)
2016	South Africa Under-20	5	(0)
2024-present	South Africa	6	(0)
- Correct as of 14 Sep 2026

Jacobus Hermanus Wiese (born 2 June 1997) is a South African rugby union player who currently plays for the Bulls in the United Rugby Championship. He can play as a flanker or a lock and was also utilized as a number 8 by Rassie Erasmus in the place of his older brother Jasper Wiese for the Springboks.

== Rugby career ==
=== 2013–2015: Schoolboy rugby ===
Wiese was born and grew up in Upington. He attended and played rugby for Hoërskool Upington, which resulted in provincial call-ups for Griquas Country Districts in 2013, 2014 and 2015.

In 2013, he was included in their Under-16 Grant Khomo Week squad for the tournament held in Vanderbijlpark, starting all three of their matches.

The following year, he was included in the Griquas Country Districts squad that competed in South Africa's premier rugby union tournament at high school level, the Under-18 Craven Week, held in Middelburg. He again started all three of their matches at the tournament and scored one try in their 26–20 victory over Zimbabwe. At the conclusion of the tournament, Wiese was named in the South Africa Schools for the Under-18 International Series. He played off the bench in their 28–13 victory over their counterparts from France in their first match, started their second match – a 40–15 win over Wales – and appeared as a reserve for their 22–30 defeat to England in their final match of the series.

He once again represented Griquas Country Districts at the Under-18 Craven Week in 2015, held in Stellenbosch, starting all three matches and scoring a try in their 54–39 victory over Border Country Districts. He was included in the South Africa Schools squad for the second consecutive season and started in their victories over Wales and France, but missed their final match against England through concussion.

=== 2016–2020: Western Province / Stormers / South Africa Under-20 ===
Wiese joined the academy of the Cape Town-based Western Province for the 2016 season. Although he wasn't included in a provisional South Africa Under-20 squad, he was named in their final squad to compete at the 2016 World Rugby Under 20 Championship in Manchester, England. He started as a lock in their opening match in Pool C of the tournament, as South Africa came from behind to beat Japan 59–19. He appeared as a replacement in their second pool match as South Africa were beaten 13–19 by Argentina, but restored to the starting lineup – this time as a flanker – for their 40-31 bonus-point victory over France in their final pool match. The result saw South Africa secure a semi-final place as the best runner-up in the competition and Wiese played off the bench as they faced three-time champions England in the semi-finals. However, the hosts proved too strong for South Africa, knocking them out of the competition with a 39–17 victory. Wiese started his side's final match against Argentina in the third-place play-off final, but finished on the losing side as Argentina beat South Africa for the second time in the competition, winning 49–19 to condemn South Africa to fourth place in the competition.

He returned to domestic action for the Western Province U19 team in the 2016 Under-19 Provincial Championship. He made seven starts for the team during the regular season, scoring a try in their 66–5 victory over the Leopards U19s and a hat-trick of tries in their 64–15 win over Eastern Province U19. After making a single appearance for the Under-21 team in their match against the Leopards, he returned to the Under-19s to help them qualify for the title play-offs by finishing top of the log, having won 10 of their 12 matches. He started their 30–15 victory over Free State U19 in the semi-finals, and the final, which his team lost 19–60 to the Golden Lions to finish as runners-up in the competition.

At the start of 2017, Wiese was included in the Stormers squad for the 2017 Super Rugby season. He made his Super Rugby debut in their Round Five match against Japanese side the Sunwolves in Singapore, coming on as a replacement in the 64th minute of a 44–31 victory. He was promoted to the starting lineup for their next match at home to the Cheetahs.

=== 2020–:Sale Sharks ===
Wiese joined Premiership Rugby side Sale Sharks ahead of the 2020–21 season.

== Personal life ==
He is the younger brother of Jasper Wiese, also a first class South African rugby union player.

== Statistics ==
=== Test match record ===
As of 29 August 2026

Opponent	P	W	D	L	Try	Pts	%Won
Argentina	1	1	0	0	0	0	100
Georgia	1	1	0	0	0	0	100
Italy	1	1	0	0	0	0	100
New Zealand	1	0	0	1	0	0	0
Scotland	1	1	0	0	0	0	100
Wales	1	1	0	0	0	0	100
Total	6	5	0	1	0	0	83.33

== Honours ==
Western Province

- 2017 Currie Cup winner

South Africa

- 2025 Rugby Championship winner
