= Andell Loubser =

South African rugby union player

- Full name: Andell Anwer Loubser
- Born: 3 March 1997 (age 29) Hopefield, South Africa
- Height: 1.87 m (6 ft 1 1/2 in)
- Weight: 96 kg (212 lb)
- School: Die Hoërskool Menlopark
- University: University of Pretoria

Rugby union career
- Position: Wing / Fullback
- Current team: Cheetahs / Free State Cheetahs
Youth career
- 2014–2018: Blue Bulls
Senior career
Years	Team	Apps	(Points)
2018	Blue Bulls XV	7	(22)
2019–2020	Southern Kings	6	(5)
2021–2022	Ordizia RE	16	(10)
2022–	Cheetahs	2	
2023–	Free State Cheetahs		
- Correct as of 25 September 2022
International career
Years	Team	Apps	(Points)
2014–2015	South Africa Schools	6	(10)

Andell Anwer Loubser (born 3 March 1997) is a South African rugby union player for the Cheetahs in the European Challenge Cup and Currie Cup. His regular position is Fullback or Wing. He is very versatile and his kicking ability is world class.

Loubser was born in Hopefield, but finished his schooling at Hoërskool Menlopark in Pretoria. He was selected to represent the Blue Bulls at the 2014 and 2015 Under-18 Craven Week tournaments, and also earned a selection to the South Africa Schools squad in both seasons. He played in all six of South Africa Schools' matches in those seasons, scoring two tries in his first match against France.

Loubser got his first taste of first class rugby in 2018, for the Blue Bulls XV in the Rugby Challenge. He made his debut in his side's defeat to the Pumas in the opening match of the competition. His first (and second) senior tries came the following week in a 73–20 victory over Namibian side the Welwitschias, and he eventually made seven appearances, scoring 22 points.

In 2019, Loubser moved to Port Elizabeth to join the Southern Kings Pro14 franchise. He made his Pro14 debut in the opening round of the 2019–20 Pro14 season, starting their match against the Cardiff Blues at fullback, and scoring a try in their 27–31 defeat.
