= Ruan Vermaak =

South African rugby union player

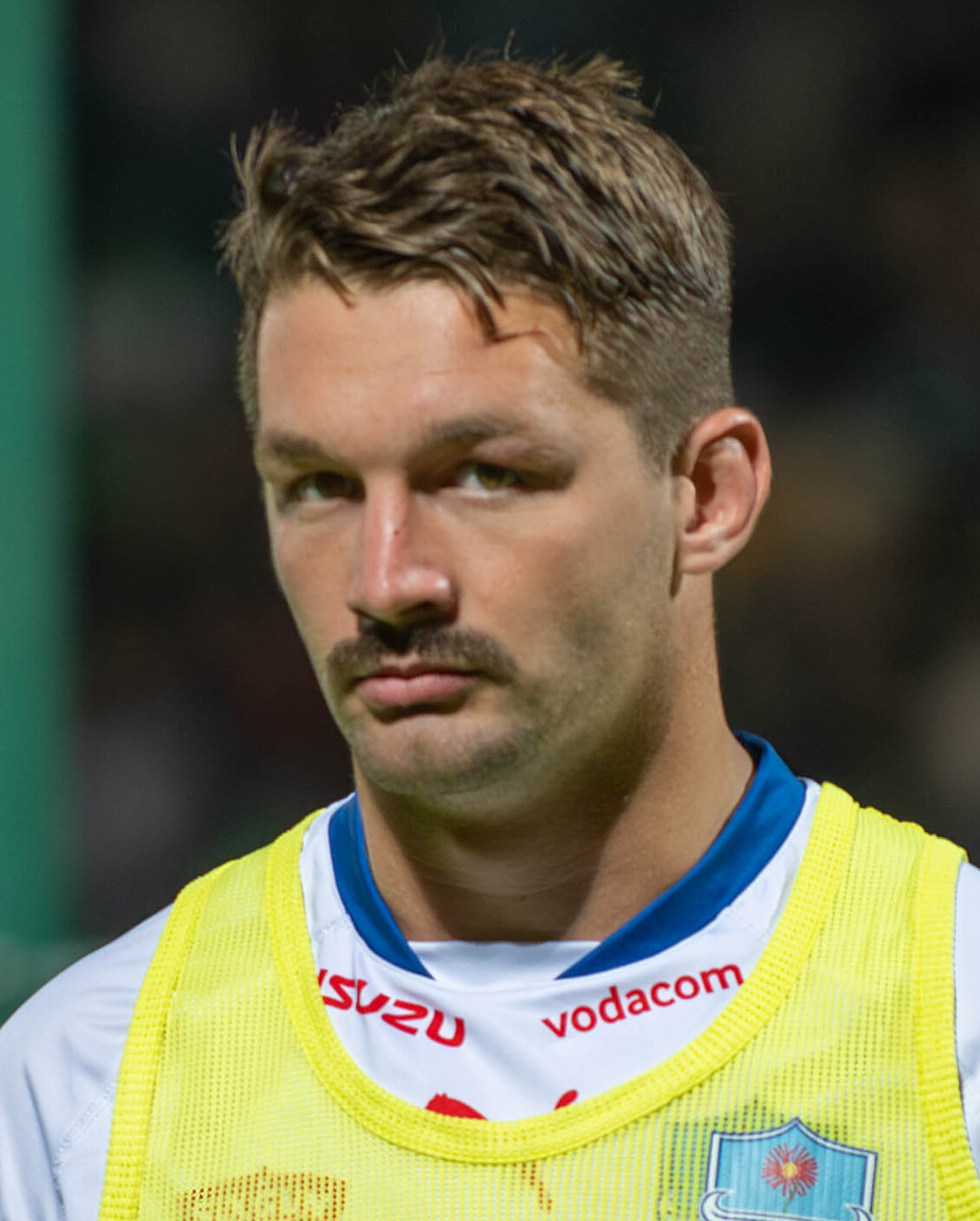
- Full name: Ruan Stefan Vermaak
- Born: 1 May 1998 (age 28) Roodepoort, South Africa
- Height: 2.01 m (6 ft 7 in)
- Weight: 118 kg (260 lb)
- School: Hoërskool Monument

Rugby union career
- Position: Lock / Flanker / No 8
- Current team: Bulls / Blue Bulls
Youth career
- 2011–2019: Golden Lions
Senior career
Years	Team	Apps	(Points)
2018	Golden Lions XV	3	(5)
2019–2020	Lions	8	(0)
2021–2022	NTT Red Hurricanes	8	(5)
2022–	Bulls	48	(35)
2022–	Blue Bulls	12	(0)
- Correct as of 23 July 2022
International career
Years	Team	Apps	(Points)
2015–2016	South Africa Schools 'A'	4	(0)
2018	South Africa Under-20	4	(0)
- Correct as of 17 February 2019

Ruan Stefan Vermaak (born 1 May 1998) is a South African professional rugby union player for the Bulls in United Rugby Championship and the Blue Bulls in the Currie Cup His regular position is lock, flank or number eight.

He represented South Africa at youth level, playing for the South Africa Schools 'A' team in the Under-19 International Series in 2015 and 2016 and for the South Africa Under-20 team at the 2018 World Rugby Under 20 Championship.

He made his Super Rugby debut for the Lions in February 2019, coming on as a replacement in their 25–16 victory over the Jaguares in Buenos Aires.
