= Courtney Winnaar =

South African rugby union player (born 1997)

- Full name: Courtney Kresten Winnaar
- Born: 27 March 1997 (age 29) East London, South Africa
- Height: 1.82 m (5 ft 11 1/2 in)
- Weight: 80 kg (180 lb; 12 st 8 lb)
- School: Dale College Boys' High School, King William's Town
- University: Nelson Mandela Metropolitan University

Rugby union career
- Position: Fullback / Fly-half
- Current team: Southern Kings
Youth career
- 2013–2015: Border Bulldogs
- 2016: Eastern Province Kings
Senior career
Years	Team	Apps	(Points)
2016	Eastern Province Kings	5	(28)
2016	Southern Kings	5	(0)
2017–2018	Sharks XV	16	(41)
2017–2018	Sharks (Currie Cup)	1	(0)
- Correct as of 14 February 2020

Courtney Kresten Winnaar (born 27 March 1997) is a South African rugby union player for the Russian Rugby Club Dynamo Moscow in the Russian Rugby Championship. He can play as a fullback or fly-half.

== Rugby career ==
=== 2013–15: Schoolboy rugby ===
Winnaar attended Dale College Boys' High School in King William's Town, earning provincial selections to represent the Border Bulldogs between 2013 and 2015. In 2013, he represented the team at the Under-16 Grant Khomo Week held in Vanderbijlpark, scoring one try in the tournament in their 15–13 victory over Free State. He played in the premier South African high schools competition, the Under-18 Craven Week, in both 2014 and 2015. He again scored a try in each of these tournaments; in the 2014 event held in Middelburg, he scored a late try against the Griffons (before also converting the try), while in the 2015 event held in Stellenbosch, he scored a try against the Falcons, after also kicking five points in their match against Boland three days earlier.

=== 2016: Eastern Province Kings ===
In 2016, Winnaar joined the Eastern Province Academy. He was included in the squad for the NMMU Madibaz – a university rugby team that is affiliated with Eastern Province's Academy – for the 2016 Varsity Cup. He was named on the bench for their match against UJ in Johannesburg, but failed to make an appearance.

Winnaar was amongst a large contingent of youngsters that were included in the Eastern Province Kings squad for the 2016 Currie Cup qualification series. He was named on the bench for their first match of the season against the SWD Eagles and replaced Keanu Vers shortly after half-time to make his first class debut in a 14–37 defeat. He was promoted to the starting lineup for their second match of the season against the Boland Cavaliers in Wellington and was also handed the kicking duties. He kicked two penalties in the first half of the match and scored his first senior try just before the hour mark in an eventual 18–37 defeat. He scored a second try in their next match against the Border Bulldogs the following week – also kicking a conversion in a 14–28 loss – and made it three tries in three matches when he scored the second of the EP Kings' five tries in a 31–18 victory over Namibian side the Welwitschias in Windhoek.

After those four Currie Cup appearances, Winnaar joined the Eastern Province U19 team for their 2016 Under-19 Provincial Championship campaign.

=== 2017–2018: Sharks ===
In 2017 Winnaar was voted Sharks Under 21 Player of the Year
