= Adré Smith =

South African rugby union player

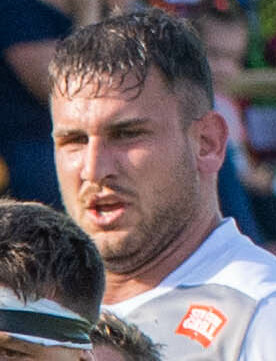
- Born: 4 June 1997 (age 29) Swellendam, South Africa
- Height: 2.01 m (6 ft 7 in)
- Weight: 125 kg (276 lb)
- School: Hoër Landbouskool Oakdale, Riversdale

Rugby union career
- Position: Lock / Flank
- Current team: Stormers, Western Province
Senior career
Years	Team	Apps	(Points)
2018–2019	Blue Bulls XV	5	(0)
2019	Blue Bulls	4	(0)
2020–2021	Griquas	17	(15)
2021–	Stormers	48	(20)
2022–	Western Province	2	(5)
2025	Toyota Verblitz	8	(10)
- Correct as of 23 July 2022

Adré Smith (born 4 June 1997) is a South African rugby union player for Western Province in the Currie Cup and the Stormers in the United Rugby Championship. His regular position is lock.
