= Rugby Challenge (South Africa) =

Secondary domestic rugby union competition in South Africa

- Competition logo
- Sport: Rugby union
- Founded: 2017
- First season: 2017
- No. of teams: 16
- Countries: South Africa, Namibia, Zimbabwe
- Most recent champion: Griquas
- Most titles: Griquas, Pumas, Western Province
- Sponsor: SuperSport
- Related competitions: Currie Cup

The Rugby Challenge – known as the SuperSport Rugby Challenge for sponsorship reasons – was the secondary domestic rugby union competition in South Africa from 2017 to 2019. The competition was organised by the South African Rugby Union and featured all fourteen South African provincial unions plus Namibian side the Welwitschias and the Zimbabwe Academy. The inaugural season of the competition was in 2017, and was intended as the long-term successor of the Vodacom Cup competition.

The competition was played at roughly the same time as Super Rugby each season, and featured a combination of Super Rugby players returning from injury, reserve players attempting to maintain their fitness levels and younger players trying to break through to the Super Rugby or Currie Cup sides. It therefore served as an important developmental competition for South African rugby.

== Format ==
The sixteen teams were geographically divided into two sections – a North Section and a Southern Section. Each team would play the other teams in their section once during the regular season, either at home or away. Some fixtures were moved to a neutral venue as part of a "SuperStack" initiative, where three matches—including a local amateur club match—were played at one site, with free entry available at these festivals to help promote rugby amongst all social strata. The winner and runner-up of each section would qualify to the Quarter Finals, along with the two third-placed teams with the best records.

== Teams ==
The teams that competed in the Rugby Challenge were:

Location of teams in the Rugby Challenge
Northern Section
Southern Section

Northern Section
Team	Sponsored name
Blue Bulls XV	Vodacom Blue Bulls XV
Falcons	Hino Valke
Golden Lions XV	Xerox Golden Lions XV
Griffons	Down Touch Griffons
Griquas	Tafel Lager Griquas
Leopards	Leopards
Pumas	Steval Pumas
Welwitschias	Windhoek Draught Welwitschias

Southern Section
Team	Sponsored name
Boland Cavaliers	Boland Cavaliers
Border Bulldogs	Border Bulldogs
Eastern Province Elephants	Eastern Province Elephants
Free State XV	Toyota Free State XV
Sharks XV	Cell C Sharks XV
SWD Eagles	SWD Eagles
Western Province	DHL Western Province
Zimbabwe Academy	Zimbabwe Academy

=== Finals ===
The results of the finals played in the Rugby Challenge competition are as follows:

Rugby Challenge finals
Season	Winner	Score	Runner-Up
2017	Western Province	28–19	Griquas
2018	Pumas	32–30	Griquas
2019	Griquas	28–13	Pumas

=== Overall record ===
The overall record for the teams in the Rugby Challenge competition is as follows:

Rugby Challenge overall record
Team Name	Champions	Runner-Up	Semi-Final	Quarter Final
Griquas	1	2	0	0
Pumas	1	1	0	1
Western Province	1	0	1	1
Blue Bulls	0	0	1	1
Boland Cavaliers	0	0	1	1
Free State Cheetahs	0	0	1	1
Golden Lions	0	0	1	1
Sharks XV	0	0	1	1
Eastern Province Elephants	0	0	0	1
Falcons	0	0	0	0
Leopards	0	0	0	0
SWD Eagles	0	0	0	0
Border Bulldogs	0	0	0	0
Griffons	0	0	0	0
Welwitschias	0	0	0	0
Zimbabwe Academy	0	0	0	0

== Non-South African clubs ==
Team	Location	Stadium	Capacity
Welwitschias	Windhoek	Hage Geingob Rugby Stadium	10,000

== See also ==
- Currie Cup
- SA Cup
- Vodacom Cup
- Bankfin Nite Series
