= 2019 Bulls (rugby union) season =

Season of South African rugby union team

Bulls
- 2019 season
- Head coach: Pote Human
- Captain: Lood de Jager
- Stadium: Loftus Versfeld, Pretoria
- Overall: 5th
- South African Conference: 2nd
- Record: Won 8, Drew 2, Lost 6
- Top try scorer: All: Cornal Hendricks and Rosko Specman (5)
- Top points scorer: All: Handré Pollard (194)

In 2019, the Bulls participated in the 2019 Super Rugby competition, the 24th edition of the competition since its inception in 1996. They were included in the South African Conference of the competition, along with the Jaguares, Lions, Sharks and Stormers.

The Bulls won eight, drew two and lost six of their matches during the regular season of the competition to finish second in the South African Conference, and in 5th place overall to qualify for the finals as a wildcard team. They lost in their quarterfinal match to the Hurricanes.

== Personnel ==
=== Coaches and management ===
The Bulls coaching and management staff for the 2019 Super Rugby season were:

2019 Bulls coaches and management
Name	Title
Alan Zondagh	Director of Rugby
Pote Human	Head coach
Chris Rossouw	Backline and attack coach
Daan Human	Scrum and maul specialist coach
Anton Leonard	Lineout specialist
Hayden Groepes	Skills coach (incl. kicking and kicking strategy)
Pine Pienaar	Defence coach
John-William Meyer	Technical analyst

=== Squad ===
The following players were named in the Bulls squad for the 2019 Super Rugby season:

2019 Bulls squad
Player	Position/s	Date of birth (age)	Super Rugby		Bulls	
Player	Position/s	Date of birth (age)	Apps	Pts	Apps	Pts
(South Africa) Tim Agaba	Loose forward	23 July 1989 (aged 29)	1	0	1	0
(South Africa) Matthys Basson	Prop	9 June 1995 (aged 23)	2	0	2	0
(South Africa) Thembelani Bholi	Loose forward	18 January 1990 (aged 29)	30	5	14	0
(South Africa) Marnitz Boshoff	Fly-half	11 January 1989 (aged 30)	32	246	3	11
(South Africa) Schalk Brits	Hooker	16 May 1981 (aged 37)	63	20	0	0
(South Africa) Lood de Jager	Lock	17 December 1992 (aged 26)	60	25	20	20
(South Africa) Nick de Jager	Loose forward	7 February 1990 (aged 29)	29	20	29	20
(South Africa) Carel du Preez	Loose forward	30 April 1993 (aged 25)	0	0	0	0
(South Africa) Corniel Els	Hooker	19 January 1994 (aged 25)	0	0	0	0
(South Africa) Stedman Gans	Centre	19 March 1997 (aged 21)	0	0	0	0
(South Africa) Warrick Gelant	Outside back	20 May 1995 (aged 23)	34	60	34	60
(South Africa) Lizo Gqoboka	Prop	24 March 1990 (aged 28)	37	10	37	10
(South Africa) Johan Grobbelaar	Hooker	30 December 1997 (aged 21)	1	0	1	0
(South Africa) Cornal Hendricks	Wing	18 April 1988 (aged 30)	27	55	0	0
(South Africa) Wiehahn Herbst	Prop	5 July 1988 (aged 30)	40	0	0	0
(South Africa) Travis Ismaiel	Outside back	2 June 1992 (aged 26)	39	50	39	50
(South Africa) JT Jackson	Centre	10 July 1996 (aged 22)	1	0	1	0
(South Africa) Jason Jenkins	Lock	2 December 1995 (aged 23)	40	35	40	35
(South Africa) Jannes Kirsten	Loose forward	1 December 1993 (aged 25)	31	10	31	10
(South Africa) Johnny Kôtze	Centre	24 January 1993 (aged 26)	34	40	15	35
(South Africa) Jesse Kriel	Centre	15 February 1994 (aged 25)	61	75	61	75
(South Africa) Manie Libbok	Fly-half	15 July 1997 (aged 21)	8	13	8	13
(South Africa) Hanro Liebenberg	Loose forward	10 October 1995 (aged 23)	28	15	28	15
(South Africa) Madot Mabokela	Prop	15 July 1996 (aged 22)	0	0	0	0
(South Africa) Theo Maree	Scrum-half	2 March 1995 (aged 23)	0	0	0	0
(South Africa) Edgar Marutlulle	Hooker	20 December 1987 (aged 31)	33	20	8	0
(South Africa) Simphiwe Matanzima	Prop	18 August 1997 (aged 21)	0	0	0	0
(South Africa) Duncan Matthews	Outside back	24 February 1994 (aged 24)	8	15	8	15
(South Africa) Nqoba Mxoli	Prop	28 May 1992 (aged 26)	5	0	5	0
(South Africa) Trevor Nyakane	Prop	4 May 1989 (aged 29)	91	15	49	0
(South Africa) Burger Odendaal	Centre	15 April 1993 (aged 25)	43	15	43	15
(South Africa) Embrose Papier	Scrum-half	25 April 1997 (aged 21)	10	5	10	5
(South Africa) Handré Pollard	Fly-half	11 March 1994 (aged 24)	46	437	46	437
(Namibia) Divan Rossouw	Outside back	12 March 1996 (aged 22)	14	15	14	15
(South Africa) Dylan Sage	Centre	24 January 1992 (aged 27)	0	0	0	0
(South Africa) Paul Schoeman	Loose forward	19 December 1992 (aged 26)	24	35	0	0
(South Africa) Roelof Smit	Loose forward	11 January 1993 (aged 26)	25	15	25	15
(South Africa) Chris Smith	Fly-half	9 September 1994 (aged 24)	0	0	0	0
(South Africa) Eli Snyman	Lock	25 January 1996 (aged 23)	0	0	0	0
(South Africa) RG Snyman	Lock	29 January 1995 (aged 24)	39	10	39	10
(South Africa) Rosko Specman	Wing	28 April 1989 (aged 29)	0	0	0	0
(South Africa) Hendré Stassen	Loose forward	29 December 1997 (aged 21)	3	0	3	0
(South Africa) Ruan Steenkamp	Loose forward	2 February 1993 (aged 26)	11	0	11	0
(South Africa) Jade Stighling	Outside back	27 May 1993 (aged 25)	2	0	2	0
(South Africa) Muller Uys	Loose forward	2 September 1998 (aged 20)	0	0	0	0
(South Africa) Dayan van der Westhuizen	Prop	5 April 1994 (aged 24)	10	0	0	0
(South Africa) Marco van Staden	Loose forward	25 August 1995 (aged 23)	16	10	16	10
(South Africa) Conraad van Vuuren	Prop	4 September 1995 (aged 23)	17	5	17	5
(South Africa) Ivan van Zyl	Scrum-half	30 June 1995 (aged 23)	17	0	17	0
(South Africa) Jano Venter	Loose forward	8 January 1994 (aged 25)	0	0	0	0
(South Africa) Duane Vermeulen	Loose forward	3 July 1986 (aged 32)	109	40	0	0
(South Africa) Jaco Visagie	Hooker	8 July 1992 (aged 26)	36	5	36	5
(South Africa) André Warner	Scrum-half	2 September 1993 (aged 25)	13	15	13	15
Note: Players' ages and statistics are correct as of 15 February 2019, the date of the opening round of the competition.

== Standings ==
2019 Super Rugby standings
Pos	Team	Pld	W	D	L	PF	PA	PD	TF	TA	TB	LB	Pts	Qualification
1	Crusaders (C)	16	11	3	2	497	257	+240	73	31	8	0	58	Quarter-finals (Conference leaders)
2	Jaguares	16	11	0	5	461	352	+109	60	38	5	2	51	Quarter-finals (Conference leaders)
3	Brumbies	16	10	0	6	430	366	+64	65	49	5	3	48	Quarter-finals (Conference leaders)
4	Hurricanes	16	12	1	3	449	362	+87	60	46	3	0	53	Quarter-finals (Wildcard)
5	Bulls	16	8	2	6	410	369	+41	42	50	3	2	41	Quarter-finals (Wildcard)
6	Sharks	16	7	1	8	343	335	+8	40	39	3	4	37	Quarter-finals (Wildcard)
7	Chiefs	16	7	2	7	451	465	−14	63	59	2	2	36	Quarter-finals (Wildcard)
8	Highlanders	16	6	3	7	441	392	+49	60	53	2	4	36	Quarter-finals (Wildcard)
9	Lions	16	8	0	8	401	478	−77	53	64	2	1	35	
10	Stormers	16	7	1	8	344	366	−22	34	46	1	4	35	
11	Rebels	16	7	0	9	393	465	−72	56	61	3	3	34	
12	Waratahs	16	6	0	10	367	415	−48	46	54	0	6	30	
13	Blues	16	5	1	10	347	369	−22	45	47	2	6	30	
14	Reds	16	6	0	10	385	438	−53	50	59	1	3	28	
15	Sunwolves	16	2	0	14	294	584	−290	34	85	0	4	12	

Source: Super Rugby

=== Round-by-round ===
The table below shows the Bulls' progression throughout the season. For each round, their cumulative points total is shown with the overall log position:

Team	R1	R2	R3	R4	R5	R6	R7	R8	R9	R10	R11	R12	R13	R14	R15	R16	R17	R18	QF	SF	Final
Opposition	STO	JAG	LIO	SHA	Bye	CHI	SHA	JAG	RED	Bye	STO	WAR	CRU	REB	BRU	BLU	HIG	LIO			
Cumulative Points																					
Position (overall)																					
Position (SA Conf.)																					
Key:	win	draw	loss	bye																	

== Matches ==
The Bulls played the following matches during the 2019 Super Rugby season:

16 February 2019	Bulls	40–3	Stormers	Loftus Versfeld, Pretoria
17:35	Try: Rosko Specman 4', 19'; Johnny Kôtze 24'; Jesse Kriel 45'; Con: Handré Pollard 5', 20', 25', 46'; Pen: Handré Pollard 51', 55', 70', 77'	Scoreboard	Pen: SP Marais 10'	Referee: Jaco Peyper

23 February 2019	Jaguares	27–12	Bulls	José Amalfitani Stadium, Buenos Aires
23:40	Try: Matías Orlando 17'; Rodrigo Bruni 64'; Bautista Delguy 72'; Con: Joaquín Díaz Bonilla 18', 65', 73'; Pen: Joaquín Díaz Bonilla 48', 67'	Scoreboard	Pen: Handré Pollard 24', 45', 54', 60'	Referee: Brendon Pickerill

2 March 2019	Lions	12–30	Bulls	Emirates Airline Park, Johannesburg
15:05	Try: Carlü Sadie 47'; Dylan Smith 65'; Con: Elton Jantjies 66'	Scoreboard	Try: Duane Vermeulen 29'; Warrick Gelant 74'; Con: Handré Pollard 76'; Pen: Handré Pollard 14', 27', 37', 43', 58', 62'	Referee: Paul Williams

9 March 2019	Bulls	37–14	Sharks	Loftus Versfeld, Pretoria
17:15	Try: Jesse Kriel 19'; Rosko Specman 43', 80'; Con: Handré Pollard 21', 80'; Pen: Handré Pollard 3', 9', 29', 35', 52'; Drop: Handré Pollard 78'	Scoreboard	Try: Jeremy Ward 41'; Dan du Preez 55'; Con: Robert du Preez 42', 55'	Referee: Marius van der Westhuizen

23 March 2019	Bulls	20–56	Chiefs	Loftus Versfeld, Pretoria
15:05	Try: Jesse Kriel 63'; Burger Odendaal 78'; Con: Handré Pollard 64', 78'; Pen: Handré Pollard 15', 34'	Scoreboard	Try: Solomon Alaimalo 25', 80'; Alex Nankivell 31', 60'; Brodie Retallick 40', 41'; Te Toiroa Tahuriorangi 73'; Con: Damian McKenzie 26', 32', 40', 43', 61', 74'; Pen: Damian McKenzie 11', 70', 76'	Referee: AJ Jacobs

30 March 2019	Sharks	16–19	Bulls	Jonsson Kings Park, Durban
15:05	Try: Dan du Preez 40'; André Esterhuizen 71'; Pen: Robert du Preez 5', 61'	Scoreboard	Try: Jesse Kriel 52'; Con: Handré Pollard 52'; Pen: Handré Pollard 2', 28', 67', 79'	Referee: Mike Fraser

6 April 2019	Bulls	20–22	Jaguares	Loftus Versfeld, Pretoria
15:05	Try: Jade Stighling 43'; Pen: Manie Libbok 7', 16', 24', 53', 60'	Scoreboard	Try: Pablo Matera 26'; Domingo Miotti 72', 75'; Con: Santiago González Iglesias 28'; Domingo Miotti 74'; Pen: Santiago González Iglesias 51'	Referee: Brendon Pickerill

13 April 2019	Bulls	32–17	Reds	Loftus Versfeld, Pretoria
17:15	Try: Lizo Gqoboka 4'; Marco van Staden 28'; Handré Pollard 41'; Hanro Liebenberg 60'; Jade Stighling 64'; Con: Handré Pollard 42', 61'; Pen: Handré Pollard 14'	Scoreboard	Try: Samu Kerevi 57', 69'; Con: Bryce Hegarty 59', 69'; Pen: Bryce Hegarty 1'	Referee: Glen Jackson

27 April 2019	Stormers	24–23	Bulls	DHL Newlands, Cape Town
15:05	Try: Sergeal Petersen 12'; Seabelo Senatla 28'; Herschel Jantjies 59'; Con: Jean-Luc du Plessis 14', 29'; Joshua Stander 60'; Pen: Joshua Stander 56'	Scoreboard	Try: Ivan van Zyl 42'; Manie Libbok 80'; Con: Handré Pollard 43', 80'; Pen: Handré Pollard 22', 37', 40'	Referee: Glen Jackson

4 May 2019	Bulls	28–21	Waratahs	Loftus Versfeld, Pretoria
15:05	Try: Warrick Gelant 9'; Duane Vermeulen 17'; Simphiwe Matanzima 70'; Con: Handré Pollard 10', 71'; Pen: Handré Pollard 7', 25', 42'	Scoreboard	Try: Nick Phipps 11'; Kurtley Beale 51'; Curtis Rona 66'; Con: Bernard Foley 12', 52', 68'	Referee: Jaco Peyper

10 May 2019	Bulls	13–45	Crusaders	Loftus Versfeld, Pretoria
19:10	Try: Burger Odendaal 56'; Con: Handré Pollard 56'; Pen: Handré Pollard 18', 28'	Scoreboard	Try: Richie Mo'unga 14', 21'; Mitchell Dunshea 30'; Sevu Reece 36', 47', 66'; Scott Barrett 74'; Con: Richie Mo'unga 14', 22', 37', 48', 67'	Referee: Rasta Rasivhenge

17 May 2019	Rebels	17–32	Bulls	AAMI Park, Melbourne
11:45	Try: Marika Koroibete 8', 42'; Will Genia 27'; Con: Quade Cooper 9'	Scoreboard	Try: Cornal Hendricks 11'; Handré Pollard 17'; Burger Odendaal 59'; Rosko Specman 69'; Con: Handré Pollard 12', 18', 60'; Pen: Handré Pollard 40', 74'	Referee: Federico Anselmi

24 May 2019	Brumbies	22–10	Bulls	GIO Stadium, Canberra
11:45	Try: Tevita Kuridrani 4', 38', 56'; Irae Simone 44'; Con: Christian Lealiifano 39'	Scoreboard	Try: Hanro Liebenberg 18'; Con: Manie Libbok 20'; Pen: Manie Libbok 2'	Referee: Jaco Peyper

31 May 2019	Blues	22–22	Bulls	Eden Park, Auckland
9:35	Try: Ofa Tu'ungafasi 24'; Scott Scrafton 46'; Akira Ioane 63'; Con: Harry Plummer 25', 64'; Pen: Harry Plummer 15'	Scoreboard	Try: Hanro Liebenberg 18'; Cornal Hendricks 52'; Manie Libbok 75'; Con: Manie Libbok 54', 76'; Pen: Manie Libbok 8'	Referee: Mike Fraser

7 June 2019	Highlanders	24–24	Bulls	Forsyth Barr Stadium, Dunedin
9:35	Try: Josh McKay 12', 34'; Waisake Naholo 22', 54'; Con: Josh Ioane 13', 35'	Scoreboard	Try: Divan Rossouw 28'; Jason Jenkins 37'; Jaco Visagie 74'; Con: Handré Pollard 29', 38', 75'; Pen: Handré Pollard 59'	Referee: Angus Gardner

15 June 2019	Bulls	48–27	Lions	Loftus Versfeld, Pretoria
17:15	Try: Hanro Liebenberg 4'; Marco van Staden 11'; Lizo Gqoboka 15'; Burger Odendaal 19'; Cornal Hendricks 60'; Handré Pollard 65'; Manie Libbok 71'; Con: Handré Pollard 4', 12', 16', 20', 66'; Pen: Handré Pollard 25'	Scoreboard	Try: Hacjivah Dayimani 1'; Cyle Brink 56'; Con: Elton Jantjies 2'; Pen: Elton Jantjies 9', 29', 37', 43'; Drop: Andries Coetzee 14'	Referee: Marius van der Westhuizen

Quarter-final	22 June 2019	Hurricanes	35–28	Bulls	Westpac Stadium, Wellington
	9:35	Try: TJ Perenara 17'; Ben Lam 23'; Salesi Rayasi 28', 43'; Con: Beauden Barrett 19', 24', 29'; Pen: Beauden Barrett 11'; Jordie Barrett 56', 64'	Scoreboard	Try: Warrick Gelant 13'; Cornal Hendricks 34', 58' penalty try 51'; Con: Handré Pollard 14', 35', 59'	Referee: Nic Berry

== Player statistics ==
The Super Rugby appearance record for players that represented the Bulls in 2019 is as follows:

2019 Bulls player statistics
Player name	STO	JAG	LIO	SHA	CHI	SHA	JAG	RED	STO	WAR	CRU	REB	BRU	BLU	HIG	LIO	QF	SF	F	App	Try	Con	Pen	DG	Pts
Lizo Gqoboka	1	1	1	1	1	1	1	1	1	1	1	1	1	1	1	1	1	—N/a	—N/a	17	2	0	0	0	10
Schalk Brits	2	2	2	2	2	2					2	2	2	2	2			—N/a	—N/a	11	0	0	0	0	0
Trevor Nyakane	3	3	3	3	3	3	3	3	3	3	3	3	3	3	3	3	3	—N/a	—N/a	17	0	0	0	0	0
Jason Jenkins	4	4	4	5	5	4					4	4	4	4	4		4	—N/a	—N/a	12	1	0	0	0	5
Lood de Jager	5	5																—N/a	—N/a	2	0	0	0	0	0
Ruan Steenkamp	6	6	6		6	6	6							20 (substituted on)	6	20 (substituted on)	20 (substituted on)	—N/a	—N/a	10	0	0	0	0	0
Hanro Liebenberg	7	8	7	4	4	7	4	7	7	7		7	7	7	7	7	7	—N/a	—N/a	16	4	0	0	0	20
Duane Vermeulen	8	7	8	8	8	8	8		8	8	8	8	8			8	8	—N/a	—N/a	14	2	0	0	0	10
Embrose Papier	9	9	9	21 (substituted on)	21 (substituted on)	9	9	21 (substituted on)	21 (substituted on)		21 (substituted on)	21 (substituted on)	21 (substituted on)		9			—N/a	—N/a	13	0	0	0	0	0
Handré Pollard	10	10	10	10	10	10		10	10	10	10	10			10	10	10	—N/a	—N/a	14	3	31	38	1	194
Rosko Specman	11	11	11	11	11	11				11	11	11	11	11		11	11	—N/a	—N/a	13	5	0	0	0	25
Burger Odendaal	12	12			12	12	12	12	12		12	12	12	12	12	12		—N/a	—N/a	13	4	0	0	0	20
Jesse Kriel	13	13	13	13	13	13		13	13								13	—N/a	—N/a	9	4	0	0	0	20
Johnny Kôtze	14					23 (substituted on)	14	14	11	12	13	13	13	13	11	13	12	—N/a	—N/a	13	1	0	0	0	5
Warrick Gelant	15	15	15	15				15	15	15		15	15	15		15	15	—N/a	—N/a	12	3	0	0	0	15
Corniel Els	16 (substituted on)	16 (substituted on)	16 (substituted on)	16 (substituted on)	16 (substituted on)	16 (substituted on)	2	16 (substituted on)										—N/a	—N/a	8	0	0	0	0	0
Simphiwe Matanzima	17 (substituted on)	17 (substituted on)	17 (substituted on)	17 (substituted on)	17 (substituted on)	17 (substituted on)	17 (substituted on)	17 (substituted on)	17 (substituted on)	17 (substituted on)	17 (substituted on)	17 (substituted on)	17 (substituted on)	17 (substituted on)	17 (substituted on)	17 (substituted on)	17 (substituted on)	—N/a	—N/a	17	1	0	0	0	5
Dayan van der Westhuizen	18 (substituted on)	18 (substituted on)	18 (substituted on)	18 (substituted on)	18 (substituted on)													—N/a	—N/a	5	0	0	0	0	0
Eli Snyman	19 (substituted on)	19 (substituted on)	5		19 (substituted on)	5	5									19 (substituted on)		—N/a	—N/a	7	0	0	0	0	0
Thembelani Bholi	20 (substituted on)	20 (substituted on)		20 (substituted on)			19 (substituted on)	19 (substituted on)	19 (substituted on)	19 (substituted on)	19 (substituted on)							—N/a	—N/a	8	0	0	0	0	0
Ivan van Zyl	21 (substituted on)	21 (substituted on)	21 (substituted on)	9	9	21 (substituted on)	21 (substituted on)	9	9	9				9	21 (substituted on)	21 (substituted on)	21 (substituted on)	—N/a	—N/a	14	1	0	0	0	5
Manie Libbok	22 (substituted on)		22	22	22 (substituted on)	22	10	22	22 (substituted on)	22	22 (substituted on)	22 (substituted on)	10	10	22	22 (substituted on)	22	—N/a	—N/a	9	3	3	7	0	42
Dylan Sage	23 (substituted on)	23 (substituted on)	12	12	23 (substituted on)		13			13	23 (substituted on)				13			—N/a	—N/a	9	0	0	0	0	0
Cornal Hendricks		14	14	14	14	14	23 (substituted on)			14	14	14	14	14	14	14	14	—N/a	—N/a	14	5	0	0	0	25
Chris Smith		22																—N/a	—N/a	0	0	0	0	0	0
Jannes Kirsten			19 (substituted on)	6	7	19 (substituted on)	7	4	4	4	7	19 (substituted on)	19 (substituted on)	19 (substituted on)	19 (substituted on)	4	19 (substituted on)	—N/a	—N/a	15	0	0	0	0	0
Tim Agaba			20 (substituted on)	7	20 (substituted on)	20	20 (substituted on)											—N/a	—N/a	4	0	0	0	0	0
Divan Rossouw			23 (substituted on)	23	15	15	15	23 (substituted on)	23 (substituted on)	23 (substituted on)	15	23 (substituted on)	23 (substituted on)	23 (substituted on)	15	23 (substituted on)	23	—N/a	—N/a	13	1	0	0	0	5
Paul Schoeman				19 (substituted on)				8	20 (substituted on)	20 (substituted on)	20 (substituted on)	6	6	8				—N/a	—N/a	8	0	0	0	0	0
Conraad van Vuuren						18 (substituted on)	18 (substituted on)											—N/a	—N/a	2	0	0	0	0	0
Jade Stighling							11	11	14									—N/a	—N/a	3	2	0	0	0	10
Jaco Visagie							16 (substituted on)	2	2	2	16 (substituted on)	16 (substituted on)	16 (substituted on)	16 (substituted on)	16 (substituted on)	2	2	—N/a	—N/a	11	1	0	0	0	5
JT Jackson							22						22 (substituted on)	22	23 (substituted on)			—N/a	—N/a	2	0	0	0	0	0
RG Snyman								5	5	5	5	5	5	5	5	5	5	—N/a	—N/a	10	0	0	0	0	0
Marco van Staden								6	6	6	6	20 (substituted on)	20 (substituted on)	6	8	6	6	—N/a	—N/a	10	2	0	0	0	10
Wiehahn Herbst								18 (substituted on)	18 (substituted on)	18 (substituted on)	18 (substituted on)	18 (substituted on)	18 (substituted on)	18 (substituted on)	18 (substituted on)	18 (substituted on)	18 (substituted on)	—N/a	—N/a	10	0	0	0	0	0
Roelof Smit								20 (substituted on)										—N/a	—N/a	1	0	0	0	0	0
Johan Grobbelaar									16 (substituted on)	16 (substituted on)					20 (substituted on)	16 (substituted on)	16	—N/a	—N/a	4	0	0	0	0	0
André Warner										21 (substituted on)	9	9	9	21 (substituted on)		9	9	—N/a	—N/a	7	0	0	0	0	0
penalty try																				–	1	–	–	–	7
Total																				17	46	34	45	1	438

(c) denotes the team captain. For each match, the player's squad number is shown. Starting players are numbered 1 to 15, while the replacements are numbered 16 to 23. If a replacement made an appearance in the match, it is indicated by (substituted on) . "App" refers to the number of appearances made by the player, "Try" to the number of tries scored by the player, "Con" to the number of conversions kicked, "Pen" to the number of penalties kicked, "DG" to the number of drop goals kicked and "Pts" refer to the total number of points scored by the player.

- Matthys Basson, Marnitz Boshoff, Nick de Jager, Carel du Preez, Stedman Gans, Travis Ismaiel, Madot Mabokela, Theo Maree, Edgar Marutlulle, Duncan Matthews, Nqoba Mxoli, Hendré Stassen, Muller Uys and Jano Venter did not make any appearances

== See also ==
- Bulls
- 2019 Super Rugby season
