= 2015 Under-19 Provincial Championship Group A =

- Countries: South Africa
- Date: 10 July – 24 October 2015
- Champions: Eastern Province U19
- Runners-up: Blue Bulls U19
- Relegated: N/A
- Matches played: 45
- Tries scored: 332 (average 7.4 per match)
- Top point scorer: Tiaan Swanepoel (126)
- Top try scorer: Zweli Silaule (13)

The 2015 Under-19 Provincial Championship Group A was contested from 10 July to 24 October 2015. The tournament (also known as the ABSA Under-19 Provincial Championship for sponsorship reasons) was the top tier of 2015 edition of the Under-19 Provincial Championship, an annual Under-19 inter-provincial rugby union competition featuring fifteen South African provincial unions.

The competition was won by Eastern Province U19; they beat Blue Bulls U19 25–23 in the final played on 24 October 2015.

== Competition rules and information ==
There were seven participating teams in the 2015 Under-19 Provincial Championship Group A. These teams played each other twice over the course of the season, once at home and once away.

Teams received four points for a win and two points for a draw. Bonus points were awarded to teams that scored four or more tries in a game, as well as to teams that lost a match by seven points or less. Teams were ranked by log points, then points difference (points scored less points conceded).

The top four teams qualified for the title play-off semi-finals. The team that finished first had home advantage against the team that finished fourth, while the team that finished second had home advantage against the team that finished third. The final was played as a curtain raiser for the 2015 Currie Cup Premier Division final.

== Teams ==
Location of teams in the 2015 Under-19 Provincial Championship Group A

The following teams took part in the 2015 Under-19 Provincial Championship Group A competition:

2015 Under-19 Provincial Championship Group A teams
Team name	Stadium
Blue Bulls U19	Loftus Versfeld, Pretoria
Eastern Province U19	Nelson Mandela Bay Stadium, Port Elizabeth
Free State U19	Free State Stadium, Bloemfontein
Golden Lions U19	Ellis Park Stadium, Johannesburg
Leopards U19	Olën Park, Potchefstroom
Sharks U19	Kings Park Stadium, Durban
Western Province U19	Newlands Stadium, Cape Town

== Standings ==
The final league standings for the 2015 Under-19 Provincial Championship Group A were: (Note: Some tries are erroneously not included in the official log. Eastern Province U19 and the Free State Cheetahs U19 scored three tries apiece in their Round One match, which aren't included in the official logs. Further tries by the Eastern Province U19 and Leopards U19 sides against the Sharks U19 are also not included.)

2015 Under-19 Provincial Championship Group A standings
Pos	Team	P	W	D	L	PF	PA	PD	TF	TA	TB	LB	Pts
1	Eastern Province U19	12	11	0	1	339	215	+124	41	28	6	0	50
2	Blue Bulls U19	12	9	0	3	425	319	+106	59	41	8	0	44
3	Western Province U19	12	8	1	3	333	265	+68	40	37	7	1	42
4	Free State U19	12	4	2	6	336	398	−62	53	54	7	1	28
5	Golden Lions U19	12	5	0	7	324	300	+24	44	40	5	2	27
6	Leopards U19	12	2	0	10	303	459	−156	47	65	7	2	17
7	Sharks U19	12	1	1	10	233	337	−104	29	48	3	3	12

Legend and competition rules
Legend:
The top four teams qualify to the semi-finals.	P = Games played, W = Games won, D = Games drawn, L = Games lost, PF = Points for, PA = Points against, PD = Points difference, TF = Tries for, TA = Tries against, TB = Try bonus points, LB = Losing bonus points, Pts = Log points
Competition rules:
Play-offs: The top four teams qualify to the semi-finals, with the higher-placed team having home advantage. Points breakdown: * 4 points for a win * 2 points for a draw * 1 bonus point for a loss by seven points or less * 1 bonus point for scoring four or more tries in a match

=== Round-by-round ===
The table below shows each team's progression throughout the season. For each round, their cumulative points total is shown with the overall log position in brackets:

Team Progression – 2015 Under-19 Provincial Championship Group A
Team	R1	R2	R3	R4	R5	R6	R7	R8	R9	R10	R11	R12	R13	R14	Semi	Final
Eastern Province U19	4 (2nd)	9 (2nd)	13 (1st)	17 (1st)	21 (1st)	26 (1st)	26 (1st)	31 (1st)	36 (1st)	41 (1st)	41 (1st)	46 (1st)	46 (1st)	50 (1st)	Won	Won
Blue Bulls U19	5 (1st)	10 (1st)	10 (3rd)	10 (3rd)	15 (2nd)	15 (3rd)	20 (2nd)	25 (2nd)	30 (2nd)	34 (2nd)	34 (3rd)	39 (2nd)	44 (2nd)	44 (2nd)	Won	Lost
Western Province U19	4 (3rd)	4 (4th)	5 (4th)	10 (4th)	15 (3rd)	18 (2nd)	19 (3rd)	23 (3rd)	28 (3rd)	32 (3rd)	37 (2nd)	37 (3rd)	42 (3rd)	42 (3rd)	Lost	—
Free State U19	0 (6th)	0 (7th)	2 (6th)	2 (7th)	3 (7th)	6 (7th)	11 (6th)	13 (5th)	13 (6th)	13 (6th)	18 (5th)	23 (4th)	23 (4th)	28 (4th)	Lost	—
Golden Lions U19	0 (7th)	5 (3rd)	10 (2nd)	12 (2nd)	12 (4th)	12 (4th)	17 (4th)	17 (4th)	17 (4th)	18 (4th)	22 (4th)	22 (5th)	22 (5th)	27 (5th)	—	—
Leopards U19	0 (5th)	1 (5th)	1 (7th)	6 (5th)	6 (5th)	11 (5th)	12 (5th)	13 (6th)	15 (5th)	15 (5th)	16 (6th)	16 (6th)	16 (6th)	17 (6th)	—	—
Sharks U19	1 (4th)	1 (6th)	3 (5th)	5 (6th)	5 (6th)	6 (6th)	6 (7th)	6 (7th)	6 (7th)	6 (7th)	7 (7th)	7 (7th)	11 (7th)	12 (7th)	—	—
Key:	win	draw	loss	bye												

== Fixtures and results ==
The following matches were played in the 2015 Under-19 Provincial Championship Group A:

- All times are South African (GMT+2).

=== Round one ===
10 July 2015	Golden Lions U19	15–31	Blue Bulls U19	Ellis Park Stadium, Johannesburg
13:00	Try: Boeta Vermaak 9'; Paul de Beer 42'; Con: Hendrik Mulder 43' (1/2); Pen: Hendrik Mulder 2' (1/2); Cards: Nazo Nkala (yellow card) 24' to 34'	Report; Scoreboard	Try: JT Jackson 13' penalty try 23'; Ruan de Beer 38'; Arnold Gerber 70'; Con: Tinus de Beer 14', 24', 39', 71' (4/5); Pen: Tinus de Beer 5' (1/1)	Referee: Kurt Weaver

11 July 2015	Western Province U19	10–6	Sharks U19	City Park Stadium, Athlone
12:30	Try: Ruan Brits 70'; Con: Aidynn Cupido 70' (1/1); Pen: Aidynn Cupido 47' (1/2)	Report; Scoreboard	Pen: Tristan Tedder 50', 69' (2/3)	Referee: Renier Vermeulen

11 July 2015	Free State U19	15–28	Eastern Province U19	Shimla Park, Bloemfontein
13:00	Try: Charl Pretorius 8'; Rohan Roelofse 33', 36'; Con: Christiaan Nel (0/3)	Report; Scoreboard	Try: Junior Pokomela 42'; Mabhutana Peter 56'; Dominik Uytenbogaardt 69'; Con: Michael Brink (0/1); James Hall 57', 70' (2/2); Pen: Michael Brink 7', 30' (2/3); James Hall 67' (1/1); Drop: Michael Brink (0/1)	Referee: Ricus van der Hoven

Bye/s: Leopards U19

=== Round two ===
17 July 2015	Blue Bulls U19	39–21	Sharks U19	Loftus Versfeld, Pretoria
13:00	Try: Kurt Webster 5'; Franco Naudé 11', 64'; Alandré van Rooyen 15'; Gavin van den Berg 34'; Con: Tinus de Beer 12', 16', 35', 64' (4/5); Pen: Tinus de Beer 21', 45' (2/2); Cards: Gavin van den Berg (yellow card) 41' to 53'; Franco Naudé (yellow card) 66'	Report; Scoreboard	Try: S'busiso Nkosi 47'; Tristan Tedder 61'; Brent Christoffels 66'; Con: Tristan Tedder 48', 61', 68' (3/3)	Referee: Jaco Kotze

17 July 2015	Golden Lions U19	53–10	Free State U19	Ellis Park Stadium, Johannesburg
13:00	Try: Paul de Beer 4'; Jaydrin Kotze 21', 68'; Henco Smit 24'; Boeta Vermaak 31'; Wynand Botha 34'; Juandré Michau 63'; Con: Hendrik Mulder 5', 21', 25', 34', 64', 69' (6/7); Pen: Hendrik Mulder 15', 49' (2/2); Cards: Herman Britz (yellow card) 28' to 38'	Report; Scoreboard	Try: Rohan Roelofse 59'; Victor Maruping 66'; Con: Diederik Oberholzer (0/1); Julian Jordaan (0/1); Cards: Tiaan Erasmus (yellow card) 15' to 25'; Julian Jordaan (yellow card) 49' to 59'; Charl Pretorius (yellow card) 62'	Referee: Tahla Ntshakaza

18 July 2015	Leopards U19	24–41	Eastern Province U19	Olën Park, Potchefstroom
11:00	Try: Wilbri Gunter 51'; Benhard Janse van Rensburg 62'; Eddie Engelbrecht 66'; Eon Buhrmann 70'; Con: Benhard Janse van Rensburg (0/1); Siya Masuku 71' (1/2); Eddie Engelbrecht 67' (1/1)	Report; Scoreboard	Try: Junior Pokomela 10'; Jeremy Ward 17'; Mabhutana Peter 33'; NJ Oosthuizen 38'; Tango Balekile 47'; Hayden Tharratt 54'; Con: Jordan Koekemoer 11' (1/1); James Hall 18', 39', 48' (3/5); Pen: James Hall 41' (1/1); Cards: James Hall (yellow card) 4' to 14'	Referee: Tahla Ntshakaza

Bye/s: Western Province U19

=== Round three ===
24 July 2015	Sharks U19	17–17	Free State U19	Kings Park Stadium, Durban
13:00	Try: Tristan Blewett 16'; Christie van der Merwe 62'; Con: Tristan Tedder 16' (1/1); Jaywinn Juries 63' (1/1); Pen: Jaywinn Juries 65' (1/1)	Report; Scoreboard	Try: De Wet Bezuidenhout 9'; Tiaan Schmulian 32'; Carlo de Nysschen 46'; Con: Carlo de Nysschen 33' (1/3)	Referee: Ricus van der Hoven

24 July 2015	Leopards U19	13–37	Golden Lions U19	Olën Park, Potchefstroom
14:00	Try: Zweli Silaule 48'; Dieter Leicher 65'; Con: Benhard Janse van Rensburg (0/2); Pen: Benhard Janse van Rensburg 39' (1/2); Drop: Tokkie Kasselman (0/1)	Report; Scoreboard	Try: James Venter 15'; Paul de Beer 28', 33'; Barend Smit 40'; Jaydrin Kotze 68'; Con: Hendrik Mulder 16', 34', 68' (3/5); Pen: Hendrik Mulder 12', 56' (2/3)	Referee: Sindile Ngcese

25 July 2015	Eastern Province U19	13–10	Western Province U19	Nelson Mandela Bay Stadium, Port Elizabeth
14:00	Try: Jeremy Ward 29'; Con: Michael Brink 30' (1/1); Pen: Michael Brink 22', 42' (2/2)	Report; Scoreboard	Try: Michael Kumbirai 7'; Con: Aidynn Cupido 8' (1/1); Pen: Aidynn Cupido 11' (1/2); Cards: Mitchell Carstens (yellow card) 28' to 38'	Referee: Oregopotse Rametsi

Bye/s: Blue Bulls U19

=== Round four ===
31 July 2015	Eastern Province U19	24–15	Blue Bulls U19	Wolfson Stadium, KwaZakele
15:00	Try: Athi Mayinje 17'; Junior Pokomela 56'; Con: Michael Brink 18' (1/2); Pen: Michael Brink 4', 46', 54', 63' (4/5)	Report; Scoreboard	Try: Sam Mitchell 13'; Divan Rossouw 22'; Con: Tinus de Beer 23' (1/2); Pen: Tinus de Beer 6' (1/1); Cards: Stephan Enslin (yellow card) 16' to 26'; Gavin van den Berg (yellow card) 45' to 55'	Referee: Vusi Msibi

1 August 2015	Sharks U19	37–40	Leopards U19	Kings Park Stadium, Durban
13:00	Try: Alwayno Visagie 25'; Bradley Roberts 28'; S'busiso Nkosi 34', 43'; Morné Joubert 52'; Con: Tristan Tedder 29', 35', 44' (3/5); Pen: Tristan Tedder 2', 41' (2/2)	Report; Scoreboard	Try: Zweli Silaule 3'; Bhekisa Shongwe 38'; Benhard Janse van Rensburg 46'; Siya Masuku 49'; Tapiwa Mafura 59'; Henry Searle 67'; Con: Siya Masuku 39', 68' (2/6); Pen: Siya Masuku 21' (1/1); Drop: Siya Masuku 1' (1/3)	Referee: Renier Vermeulen

1 August 2015	Western Province U19	32–27	Golden Lions U19	Newlands Stadium, Cape Town
14:00	Try: Jaco Willemse 3'; Duncan Saal 8'; Eduan Keyter 18'; Gerard Pieterse 28'; Ruan Brits 54'; Con: Aidynn Cupido 4', 19' (2/5); Pen: Aidynn Cupido 14' (1/1); Cards: Jaco Coetzee (yellow card) 64'	Report; Scoreboard	Try: James Venter 39', 44'; Juandré Michau 48'; Nazo Nkala 68'; Con: Hendrik Mulder 40', 49' (2/4); Pen: Curtis Jonas 12' (1/1)	Referee: Ricus van der Hoven

Bye/s: Free State U19

=== Round five ===
8 August 2015	Eastern Province U19	28–19	Golden Lions U19	Nelson Mandela Bay Stadium, Port Elizabeth
09:30	Try: Lusanda Badiyana 52'; Yamkela Nyalambisa 57'; Athi Mayinje 68'; Con: Jeremy Ward 53', 69' (2/3); Pen: Michael Brink 5', 39', 62' (3/5)	Report; Scoreboard	Try: Mac Muller 47'; Con: Hendrik Mulder 48' (1/1); Pen: Hendrik Mulder 11', 17', 28', 34' (4/4)	Referee: Francois Pretorius

8 August 2015	Free State U19	24–42	Blue Bulls U19	Free State Stadium, Bloemfontein
10:30	Try: Victor Maruping 8', 28', 58'; De Wet Bezuidenhout 38'; Con: Julian Jordaan 9', 39' (2/4); Cards: Charl Pretorius (yellow card) 67'	Report; Scoreboard	Try: Gavin van den Berg 16'; Alandré van Rooyen 21'; Divan Rossouw 33'; JT Jackson 51'; Coneree Poole 54'; Eli Snyman 63'; Con: Tinus de Beer 17', 22', 34', 52', 55', 64' (6/6); Pen: Tinus de Beer (0/1); Cards: Jungqo Hennings (yellow card) 67'	Referee: Jaco Pretorius

8 August 2015	Leopards U19	19–38	Western Province U19	Olën Park, Potchefstroom
12:10	Try: Milani Lubelwana 11'; Siya Masuku 22'; Tapiwa Mafura 64'; Con: Benhard Janse van Rensburg 12', 23' (2/3)	Report; Scoreboard	Try: Eduan Keyter 7', 33'; Gary Porter 15'; Jaco Coetzee 28'; Aidynn Cupido 38'; Con: Tiaan Swanepoel 8', 16', 29', 34', 39' (5/5); Pen: Tiaan Swanepoel 51' (1/2)	Referee: Vusi Msibi

Bye/s: Sharks U19

=== Round six ===
14 August 2015	Blue Bulls U19	17–32	Leopards U19	Loftus Versfeld, Pretoria
15:00	Try: Divan Rossouw 18'; Dean van der Westhuizen 30'; Franco Naudé 34'; Con: Kurt Webster 19' (1/3); Cards: Coneree Poole (yellow card) 48' to 58'	Report; Scoreboard	Try: Zweli Silaule 6', 13', 52'; Siya Masuku 42'; Wilbri Gunter 68'; Con: Benhard Janse van Rensburg 43' (1/3); Siya Masuku 69' (1/2); Pen: Benhard Janse van Rensburg 10' (1/3); Siya Masuku (0/1)	Attendance: 400; Referee: Archie Sehlako

15 August 2015	Western Province U19	29–29	Free State U19	Newlands Stadium, Cape Town
10:45	Try: Iver Aanhuizen 5'; Aidynn Cupido 17'; Percy Mngadi 24'; Duncan Saal 71'; Con: Tiaan Swanepoel 6', 18', 25' (3/3); Aidynn Cupido (0/1); Pen: Tiaan Swanepoel 29' (1/2)	Report; Scoreboard	Try: Dale Koopman 8'; Carlo de Nysschen 30'; Robin Stevens 48'; Julian Jordaan 59'; Ruan Wasserman 64'; Con: Julian Jordaan 9', 31' (2/2); Ruan Wasserman (0/3)	Referee: Rodney Boneparte

15 August 2015	Sharks U19	24–34	Eastern Province U19	Kings Park Stadium, Durban
13:00	Try: Cameron McNab 4', 47'; Tristan Blewett 22'; Morné Joubert 66'; Con: Tristan Tedder 4', 22' (2/4); Pen: Tristan Tedder (0/1); Cards: Tristan Blewett (yellow card) 51' to 61'	Report; Scoreboard	Try: Athi Mayinje 8'; Lusanda Badiyana 35' penalty try 51'; Hayden Tharratt 57'; Yamkela Nyalambisa 60'; Con: Jordan Koekemoer 35' (1/2); Michael Brink 51', 60' (2/3); Pen: Jordan Koekemoer 17' (1/1); Cards: SF Nieuwoudt (yellow card) 46' to 56'	Referee: Tahla Ntshakaza

Bye/s: Golden Lions U19

=== Round seven ===
22 August 2015	Leopards U19	28–51	Free State U19	Fanie du Toit Sport Ground, Potchefstroom
12:00	Try: Francois Stemmet 22'; Zweli Silaule 60'; Milani Lubelwana 62'; Eon Buhrmann 65'; Con: Benhard Janse van Rensburg 23', 61', 63', 66' (4/4); Pen: Tapiwa Mafura (0/1)	Report; Scoreboard	Try: Charl Pretorius 7'; De Wet Bezuidenhout 13', 40'; Ruan Wasserman 16', 54'; Alex Jonker 19'; Dale Koopman 34'; Con: Ruan Wasserman 8', 14', 35', 41', 55' (5/7); Pen: Ruan Wasserman 52', 67' (2/2); Cards: Brendan Verster (yellow card) 65'	Referee: Tahla Ntshakaza

22 August 2015	Sharks U19	18–36	Golden Lions U19	Kings Park Stadium, Durban
13:00	Try: Morné Joubert 50'; Tristan Blewett 67'; Con: Tristan Tedder (0/1); Tristan Blewett 68' (1/1); Pen: Tristan Tedder 7', 27' (2/2)	Report; Scoreboard	Try: Kenny van Niekerk 12'; Jaydrin Kotze 17'; James Venter 20'; Mac Muller 34'; Juandré Michau 42'; Boeta Vermaak 55'; Con: Hendrik Mulder 13', 18', 43' (3/6)	Referee: Jaco Kotze

22 August 2015	Blue Bulls U19	41–32	Western Province U19	Loftus Versfeld, Pretoria
14:45	Try: Franco Naudé 5', 16'; Coneree Poole 21'; Dean van der Westhuizen 41'; Divan Rossouw 53'; Brendan Owen 61'; Con: Tinus de Beer 6', 42', 54', 62' (4/6); Pen: Tinus de Beer 13' (1/1)	Report; Scoreboard	Try: Jaco Willemse 33'; Mitchell Carstens 38'; Edrich Venter 65'; Jaco Coetzee 69'; Con: Tiaan Swanepoel 34', 39' (2/2); Aidynn Cupido 70' (1/2); Pen: Tiaan Swanepoel 24', 31' (2/3); Cards: Edrich Venter (yellow card) 12' to 22'	Referee: Ricus van der Hoven

Bye/s: Eastern Province U19

=== Round eight ===
28 August 2015	Free State U19	25–26	Western Province U19	Free State Stadium, Bloemfontein
15:00	Try: Christiaan Nel 39'; Niell Stannard 48'; Ruan Wasserman 53'; Victor Maruping 65'; Con: Ruan Wasserman 49' (1/4); Pen: Ruan Wasserman 57' (1/2)	Report; Scoreboard	Try: Edrich Venter 19'; Tiaan Swanepoel 43'; Con: Tiaan Swanepoel 20', 44' (2/2); Pen: Tiaan Swanepoel 29', 32', 34', 60' (4/5); Cards: Paul de Wet (yellow card) 29' to 39'	Attendance: 200; Referee: Pieter Maritz

29 August 2015	Leopards U19	31–61	Blue Bulls U19	Olën Park, Potchefstroom
11:30	Try: Zweli Silaule 51', 63'; De Wet Terblanche 58', 67'; Con: Siya Masuku 52', 59', 64', 68' (4/4); Pen: Siya Masuku 2' (1/1)	Report; Scoreboard	Try: Denzel Hill 9'; Ruan de Beer 14'; Justin Meintjies 24'; Alandré van Rooyen 29'; Hendré Stassen 34'; Franco Naudé 45', 55'; Coneree Poole 61'; Stephan Enslin 69'; Con: Tinus de Beer 10', 15', 25', 30', 35', 46', 56' (7/7); Andri Cooper 62' (1/2)	Referee: Eduan Nel

29 August 2015	Eastern Province U19	26–7	Sharks U19	Nelson Mandela Bay Stadium, Port Elizabeth
12:15	Try: Michael Brink 5'; Junior Pokomela 10'; Keanu Vers 47'; SF Nieuwoudt 65'; Con: Michael Brink 6', 11', 48' (3/4)	Report; Scoreboard	Try: Wikus Badenhorst 14'; Con: Tristan Tedder 15' (1/1); Cards: Tristan Blewett (red card) 57'	Referee: Jacques Nieuwenhuis

Bye/s: Golden Lions U19

=== Round nine ===
4 September 2015	Blue Bulls U19	57–21	Free State U19	Loftus Versfeld, Pretoria
15:00	Try: JT Jackson 7'; Stephan Enslin 13'; Denzel Hill 22'; Franco Naudé 28'; Ruan de Beer 32'; Alandré van Rooyen 40'; Justin Meintjies 44'; Divan Rossouw 49'; Hendré Stassen 58'; Con: Tinus de Beer (0/1); Brendan Owen 14', 23', 29', 33', 41', 50' (6/8)	Report; Scoreboard	Try: Charl Pretorius 16'; Henry Slabbert 52'; Rohan Roelofse 65'; Con: Ruan Wasserman 17', 53', 66' (3/3)	Referee: Vusi Msibi

5 September 2015	Western Province U19	36–34	Leopards U19	Newlands Stadium, Cape Town
12:45	Try: Justin Heunis 1'; Edwill van der Merwe 10'; Paul de Wet 15'; Jaco Coetzee 19'; Jaco Willemse 22'; Con: Tiaan Swanepoel 2', 11', 20', 23' (4/5); Pen: Tiaan Swanepoel 55' (1/1)	Report; Scoreboard	Try: Gavin Foster 14'; Dieter Leicher 30', 60'; Benhard Janse van Rensburg 35'; Wilbri Gunter 45'; Zweli Silaule 51'; Con: Siya Masuku 46', 52' (2/6)	Referee: Archie Sehlako

5 September 2015	Golden Lions U19	22–34	Eastern Province U19	Ellis Park Stadium, Johannesburg
14:45	Try: Curtis Jonas 40'; Jaydrin Kotze 55'; Jo-Hanko de Villiers 67'; Con: Hendrik Mulder 56', 68' (2/3); Pen: Hendrik Mulder 9' (1/1); Cards: Juandré Michau (yellow card) 71'	Report; Scoreboard	Try: Jeremy Ward 5'; SF Nieuwoudt 17'; Keanu Vers 24'; Athi Mayinje 46'; Con: Michael Brink 6', 18', 25', 47' (4/4); Pen: Michael Brink 12', 61' (2/2)	Referee: Ricus van der Hoven

Bye/s: Sharks U19

=== Round ten ===
11 September 2015	Eastern Province U19	29–10	Free State U19	Nelson Mandela Bay Stadium, Port Elizabeth
14:15	Try: Junior Pokomela 26', 32'; Athi Mayinje 43'; Jordan Koekemoer 67'; Con: Michael Brink 27', 33', 44' (3/4); Pen: Michael Brink 2' (1/1)	Report; Scoreboard	Try: Ruan Wasserman 63'; Con: Ruan Wasserman 64' (1/1); Pen: Ruan Wasserman 29' (1/2)	Referee: Jacques Nieuwenhuis

12 September 2015	Sharks U19	8–21	Western Province U19	Kings Park Stadium, Durban
13:00	Try: S'busiso Nkosi 40'; Con: Tristan Tedder (0/1); Pen: Tristan Tedder 22' (1/1); Cards: Jasper Genis (yellow card) 69'	Report; Scoreboard	Try: Duncan Saal 29'; Edrich Venter 50'; Con: Tiaan Swanepoel 51' (1/2); Pen: Tiaan Swanepoel 9', 16', 25' (3/3); Herschel Jantjies (0/1); Cards: Saud Abrahams (yellow card) 68'	Referee: Sindile Ngcese

12 September 2015	Blue Bulls U19	22–20	Golden Lions U19	Loftus Versfeld, Pretoria
15:00	Try: Dean van der Westhuizen 48'; Luigy van Jaarsveld 52', 59'; Con: JT Jackson 49', 53' (2/3); Pen: JT Jackson 65' (1/1)	Report; Scoreboard	Try: Jaydrin Kotze 6'; James Venter 10'; Wynand Botha 23'; Con: Hendrik Mulder 11' (1/3); Pen: Hendrik Mulder 37' (1/2)	Referee: Jaco Kotze

Bye/s: Leopards U19

=== Round eleven ===
18 September 2015	Western Province U19	53–20	Blue Bulls U19	Newlands Stadium, Cape Town
14:45	Try: Paul de Wet 3', 51'; Duncan Saal 6', 66'; Edwill van der Merwe 31'; Eduan Keyter 33'; Aidynn Cupido 59'; Con: Tiaan Swanepoel 4', 7', 34', 52', 60' (5/6); Aidynn Cupido 67' (1/1); Pen: Tiaan Swanepoel 9', 27' (2/3); Drop: Aidynn Cupido (0/1)	Report; Scoreboard	Try: Gavin van den Berg 18'; JT Jackson 42'; Con: JT Jackson 19', 43' (2/2); Pen: JT Jackson 16', 23' (2/2)	Referee: Quinton Immelman

19 September 2015	Golden Lions U19	28–22	Sharks U19	Ellis Park Stadium, Johannesburg
10:00	Try: Len Massyn 39'; Arno Maree 44', 61'; Con: Hendrik Mulder 40', 62' (2/3); Pen: Hendrik Mulder 9', 21', 33' (3/3)	Report; Scoreboard	Try: S'busiso Nkosi 12', 17'; Tristan Blewett 50'; Con: Tristan Tedder 18', 51' (2/3); Pen: Tristan Tedder 34' (1/1); Drop: Morné Joubert (0/1); Cards: Christie van der Merwe (yellow card) 41' to 51'; Tristan Blewett (yellow card) 66'	Referee: Jaco Kotze

19 September 2015	Free State U19	61–36	Leopards U19	Free State Stadium, Bloemfontein
11:00	Try: De Wet Bezuidenhout 9'; Glen Eriksen 16', 29'; Llewellyn Hein 23', 50'; Christiaan Nel 35'; Niell Stannard 43'; Charl Pretorius 56'; Robin Stevens 63'; Con: Ruan Wasserman 10', 17', 24', 30', 35', 51', 57' (7/8); Thabiso Khanye 44' (1/1); Cards: De Wet Bezuidenhout (yellow card) 19' to 29'; Tiaan Schmulian (yellow card) 70'	Report; Scoreboard	Try: Edward Haas 21'; Bhekisa Shongwe 26'; Zweli Silaule 37', 53', 59'; Dieter Leicher 69'; Con: Armand Buys (0/1); Benhard Janse van Rensburg 38', 54', 60' (3/4)	Referee: Ricus van der Hoven

Bye/s: Eastern Province U19

=== Round twelve ===
25 September 2015	Sharks U19	20–31	Blue Bulls U19	Kings Park Stadium, Durban
15:45	Try: Brent Christoffels 51'; S'busiso Nkosi 66'; Con: Tristan Tedder 52', 67' (2/2); Pen: Tristan Tedder 33', 40' (2/3)	Report; Scoreboard	Try: JT Jackson 11'; Justin Meintjies 44'; Divan Rossouw 55', 64'; Con: JT Jackson 12', 45', 56', 65' (4/4); Pen: JT Jackson 25' (1/1)	Referee: Jaco Pretorius

26 September 2015	Free State U19	32–23	Golden Lions U19	Free State Stadium, Bloemfontein
09:30	Try: Christiaan Nel 27', 43'; Llewellyn Hein 38'; Niell Stannard 46'; Robin Stevens 69'; Con: Ruan Wasserman 39', 47' (2/5); Pen: Ruan Wasserman 64' (1/2)	Report; Scoreboard	Try: Jaydrin Kotze 34'; James Venter 49', 67'; Con: Hendrik Mulder 35' (1/3); Pen: Hendrik Mulder 2', 55' (2/2); Cards: Mitchell Fraser (yellow card) 58'	Attendance: 300; Referee: Francois Pretorius

26 September 2015	Eastern Province U19	33–14	Leopards U19	Nelson Mandela Bay Stadium, Port Elizabeth
10:30	Try: Lusanda Badiyana 3'; James Hall 18'; SF Nieuwoudt 32'; Athi Mayinje 45'; Jeremy Ward 58'; Con: Michael Brink 4', 19' (2/2); James Hall 33', 46' (2/3); Cards: SF Nieuwoudt (yellow card) 47' to 57'	Report; Scoreboard	Try: De Wet Terblanche 20'; Zweli Silaule 53'; Con: Benhard Janse van Rensburg 21', 54' (2/2); Pen: Benhard Janse van Rensburg (0/1)	Referee: Jabian Jeftha

Bye/s: Western Province U19

=== Round thirteen ===
2 October 2015	Golden Lions U19	20–40	Western Province U19	Ellis Park Stadium, Johannesburg
13:45	Try: James Venter 13'; Curtis Jonas 45', 65'; Con: Hendrik Mulder 14' (1/3); Pen: Hendrik Mulder 19' (1/1)	Report; Scoreboard	Try: Mitchell Carstens 16'; Ruben Terblanche 23'; Saud Abrahams 49'; Paul de Wet 71'; Con: Tiaan Swanepoel 17', 24', 49', 71' (4/4); Pen: Tiaan Swanepoel 12', 27', 38', 43' (4/6)	Referee: Gerrie de Bruin

2 October 2015	Blue Bulls U19	49–26	Eastern Province U19	Loftus Versfeld, Pretoria
15:00	Try: Franco Naudé 2', 12', 21'; Divan Rossouw 40'; Ruan de Beer 55'; Kurt Webster 66'; Con: JT Jackson 2', 12', 22', 41', 56' (5/6); Pen: JT Jackson 45', 60', 64' (3/3); Cards: Justin Meintjies (yellow card) 24' to 34'; Hendré Stassen (yellow card) 52' to 64'	Report; Scoreboard	Try: SF Nieuwoudt 26', 34'; Con: James Hall 26', 34' (2/2); Pen: James Hall 17', 38', 44', 52' (4/4); Drop: Garrick Mattheus (0/1)	Referee: Francois Pretorius

3 October 2015	Leopards U19	14–23	Sharks U19	Olën Park, Potchefstroom
11:00	Try: Edward Haas 5'; Dieter Leicher 33'; Con: Benhard Janse van Rensburg 6', 34' (2/2)	Report; Scoreboard	Try: Ulric Sellar 14'; Alwayno Visagie 25'; Con: Alwayno Visagie 15' (1/1); Tristan Tedder 26' (1/1); Pen: Tristan Tedder 48', 53', 66' (3/3); Cards: Alwayno Visagie (yellow card) 56' to 66'	Referee: Sindile Ngcese

Bye/s: Free State U19

=== Round fourteen ===
9 October 2015	Western Province U19	6–23	Eastern Province U19	Newlands Stadium, Cape Town
13:45	Pen: Tiaan Swanepoel 21', 35' (2/3)	Report; Scoreboard	Try: Junior Pokomela 11'; SF Nieuwoudt 24'; Con: Michael Brink 12', 25' (2/2); Pen: James Hall 3' (1/2); Michael Brink 14', 33' (2/3)	Referee: Lourens van der Merwe

10 October 2015	Free State U19	41–30	Sharks U19	Free State Stadium, Bloemfontein
10:15	Try: Llewellyn Hein 11'; Alex Jonker 35', 36'; Charl Pretorius 46'; Victor Maruping 60'; Niell Stannard 64'; Ruan Wasserman 68'; Con: Ruan Wasserman 35', 37', 61' (3/7)	Report; Scoreboard	Try: Tristan Blewett 16', 70'; Jaywinn Juries 30'; Bradley Roberts 42'; Con: Tristan Tedder 17', 31' (2/3); Bernardus Haring (0/1); Pen: Tristan Tedder 20', 23' (2/2); Cards: Bernardus Haring (red card) 66'	Attendance: 80; Referee: Renier Vermeulen

10 October 2015	Golden Lions U19	24–18	Leopards U19	Ellis Park Stadium, Johannesburg
11:45	Try: Barend Smit 25'; Stean Pienaar 27'; Paul de Beer 33'; Jo-Hanko de Villiers 35'; Con: Hendrik Mulder 26', 34' (2/4); Pen: Hendrik Mulder (0/1); Cards: Tijde Visser (yellow card) 21' to 31'	Report; Scoreboard	Try: Edward Haas 17', 22'; Ruan Groenewald 50'; Con: Benhard Janse van Rensburg (0/3); Pen: Benhard Janse van Rensburg 5' (1/1)	Referee: Sindile Ngcese

Bye/s: Blue Bulls U19

=== Semi-finals ===
16 October 2015	Eastern Province U19	31–15	Free State U19	Nelson Mandela Bay Stadium, Port Elizabeth
15:00	Try: Mabhutana Peter 6'; NJ Oosthuizen 13'; Junior Pokomela 52'; Con: Michael Brink 7', 53' (2/3); Pen: Michael Brink 4', 45', 50', 63' (4/4); Garrick Mattheus (0/1); Cards: Tango Balekile (yellow card) 40' to 55'; SF Nieuwoudt (yellow card) 65'	Report; Scoreboard	Try: Janu Botha 22'; Victor Maruping 46'; Glen Eriksen 67'; Con: Ruan Wasserman (0/2); Glen Eriksen (0/1)	Referee: Stephan Geldenhuys

16 October 2015	Blue Bulls U19	30–29	Western Province U19	Loftus Versfeld, Pretoria
16:30	Try: Denzel Hill 2'; Divan Rossouw 33'; Coneree Poole 41'; JT Jackson 63'; Con: Tinus de Beer 34', 42' (2/4); Pen: Tinus de Beer 55' (1/2); JT Jackson 67' (1/1)	Report; Scoreboard	Try: Jaco Willemse 10'; Duncan Saal 38'; Jaco Coetzee 47'; Justin Heunis 48'; Con: Tiaan Swanepoel 39', 48', 49' (3/4); Pen: Tiaan Swanepoel 14' (1/4)	Referee: Archie Sehlako

=== Final ===
24 October 2015	Eastern Province U19	25–23	Blue Bulls U19	Ellis Park Stadium, Johannesburg
09:30	Try: Jeremy Ward 9', 44'; Mabhutana Peter 65'; Con: Michael Brink 10', 45' (2/3); Pen: Michael Brink 15', 24' (2/3)	Report; Scoreboard	Try: Gavin van den Berg 37'; Tinus de Beer 39'; Con: Tinus de Beer 38', 40' (2/2); Pen: Tinus de Beer 18', 31', 56' (3/4); Drop: Tinus de Beer (0/1)	Referee: Sindile Ngcese

== Honours ==
The honour roll for the 2015 Under-19 Provincial Championship Group A was:

2015 Under-19 Provincial Championship Group A Honours
Champions:	Eastern Province U19
Top Try Scorer:	Zweli Silaule, Leopards U19 (13)
Top Points Scorer:	Tiaan Swanepoel, Western Province U19 (126)

== Players ==
=== Player statistics ===
The following table contain points which were scored in the 2015 Under-19 Provincial Championship Group A:

All point scorers
No	Player	Team	T	C	P	DG	Pts
1	Tiaan Swanepoel	Western Province U19	1	29	21	0	126
2	Michael Brink	Eastern Province U19	1	22	22	0	115
3	Hendrik Mulder	Golden Lions U19	0	25	17	0	101
4	Tinus de Beer	Blue Bulls U19	1	30	9	0	92
5	Ruan Wasserman	Free State U19	6	22	5	0	89
6	Tristan Tedder	Sharks U19	1	17	15	0	84
7	JT Jackson	Blue Bulls U19	6	13	8	0	80
8	Zweli Silaule	Leopards U19	13	0	0	0	65
9	Franco Naudé	Blue Bulls U19	11	0	0	0	55
10	Benhard Janse van Rensburg	Leopards U19	3	14	3	0	52
11	Divan Rossouw	Blue Bulls U19	9	0	0	0	45
12	James Hall	Eastern Province U19	1	9	7	0	44
12	Siya Masuku	Leopards U19	3	10	2	1	44
14	Junior Pokomela	Eastern Province U19	8	0	0	0	40
14	James Venter	Golden Lions U19	8	0	0	0	40
16	Aidynn Cupido	Western Province U19	3	6	3	0	36
17	Jaydrin Kotze	Golden Lions U19	7	0	0	0	35
17	Victor Maruping	Free State U19	7	0	0	0	35
17	S'busiso Nkosi	Sharks U19	7	0	0	0	35
20	Jeremy Ward	Eastern Province U19	6	2	0	0	34
21	Tristan Blewett	Sharks U19	6	1	0	0	32
22	Athi Mayinje	Eastern Province U19	6	0	0	0	30
22	SF Nieuwoudt	Eastern Province U19	6	0	0	0	30
22	Duncan Saal	Western Province U19	6	0	0	0	30
25	De Wet Bezuidenhout	Free State U19	5	0	0	0	25
25	Paul de Beer	Golden Lions U19	5	0	0	0	25
25	Dieter Leicher	Leopards U19	5	0	0	0	25
25	Charl Pretorius	Free State U19	5	0	0	0	25
29	Jaco Coetzee	Western Province U19	4	0	0	0	20
29	Ruan de Beer	Blue Bulls U19	4	0	0	0	20
29	Paul de Wet	Western Province U19	4	0	0	0	20
29	Edward Haas	Leopards U19	4	0	0	0	20
29	Llewellyn Hein	Free State U19	4	0	0	0	20
29	Eduan Keyter	Western Province U19	4	0	0	0	20
29	Christiaan Nel	Free State U19	4	0	0	0	20
29	Mabhutana Peter	Eastern Province U19	4	0	0	0	20
29	Coneree Poole	Blue Bulls U19	4	0	0	0	20
29	Rohan Roelofse	Free State U19	4	0	0	0	20
29	Niell Stannard	Free State U19	4	0	0	0	20
29	Gavin van den Berg	Blue Bulls U19	4	0	0	0	20
29	Alandré van Rooyen	Blue Bulls U19	4	0	0	0	20
29	Jaco Willemse	Western Province U19	4	0	0	0	20
43	Curtis Jonas	Golden Lions U19	3	0	1	0	18
44	Brendan Owen	Blue Bulls U19	1	6	0	0	17
45	Lusanda Badiyana	Eastern Province U19	3	0	0	0	15
45	Glen Eriksen	Free State U19	3	0	0	0	15
45	Wilbri Gunter	Leopards U19	3	0	0	0	15
45	Denzel Hill	Blue Bulls U19	3	0	0	0	15
45	Alex Jonker	Free State U19	3	0	0	0	15
45	Morné Joubert	Sharks U19	3	0	0	0	15
45	Justin Meintjies	Blue Bulls U19	3	0	0	0	15
45	Juandré Michau	Golden Lions U19	3	0	0	0	15
45	Robin Stevens	Free State U19	3	0	0	0	15
45	De Wet Terblanche	Leopards U19	3	0	0	0	15
45	Dean van der Westhuizen	Blue Bulls U19	3	0	0	0	15
45	Edrich Venter	Western Province U19	3	0	0	0	15
45	Boeta Vermaak	Golden Lions U19	3	0	0	0	15
58	Julian Jordaan	Free State U19	1	4	0	0	13
59	Carlo de Nysschen	Free State U19	2	1	0	0	12
59	Jordan Koekemoer	Eastern Province U19	1	2	1	0	12
59	Alwayno Visagie	Sharks U19	2	1	0	0	12
59	Kurt Webster	Blue Bulls U19	2	1	0	0	12
63	Wynand Botha	Golden Lions U19	2	0	0	0	10
63	Ruan Brits	Western Province U19	2	0	0	0	10
63	Eon Buhrmann	Leopards U19	2	0	0	0	10
63	Mitchell Carstens	Western Province U19	2	0	0	0	10
63	Brent Christoffels	Sharks U19	2	0	0	0	10
63	Jo-Hanko de Villiers	Golden Lions U19	2	0	0	0	10
63	Stephan Enslin	Blue Bulls U19	2	0	0	0	10
63	Justin Heunis	Western Province U19	2	0	0	0	10
63	Jaywinn Juries	Sharks U19	1	1	1	0	10
63	Dale Koopman	Free State U19	2	0	0	0	10
63	Milani Lubelwana	Leopards U19	2	0	0	0	10
63	Tapiwa Mafura	Leopards U19	2	0	0	0	10
63	Arno Maree	Golden Lions U19	2	0	0	0	10
63	Cameron McNab	Sharks U19	2	0	0	0	10
63	Mac Muller	Golden Lions U19	2	0	0	0	10
63	Yamkela Nyalambisa	Eastern Province U19	2	0	0	0	10
63	NJ Oosthuizen	Eastern Province U19	2	0	0	0	10
63	Bradley Roberts	Sharks U19	2	0	0	0	10
63	Bhekisa Shongwe	Leopards U19	2	0	0	0	10
63	Barend Smit	Golden Lions U19	2	0	0	0	10
63	Hendré Stassen	Blue Bulls U19	2	0	0	0	10
63	Hayden Tharratt	Eastern Province U19	2	0	0	0	10
63	Edwill van der Merwe	Western Province U19	2	0	0	0	10
63	Luigy van Jaarsveld	Blue Bulls U19	2	0	0	0	10
63	Keanu Vers	Eastern Province U19	2	0	0	0	10
88	Eddie Engelbrecht	Leopards U19	1	1	0	0	7
89	Iver Aanhuizen	Western Province U19	1	0	0	0	5
89	Saud Abrahams	Western Province U19	1	0	0	0	5
89	Wikus Badenhorst	Sharks U19	1	0	0	0	5
89	Tango Balekile	Eastern Province U19	1	0	0	0	5
89	Janu Botha	Free State U19	1	0	0	0	5
89	Gavin Foster	Leopards U19	1	0	0	0	5
89	Arnold Gerber	Blue Bulls U19	1	0	0	0	5
89	Ruan Groenewald	Leopards U19	1	0	0	0	5
89	Michael Kumbirai	Western Province U19	1	0	0	0	5
89	Len Massyn	Golden Lions U19	1	0	0	0	5
89	Sam Mitchell	Blue Bulls U19	1	0	0	0	5
89	Percy Mngadi	Western Province U19	1	0	0	0	5
89	Nazo Nkala	Golden Lions U19	1	0	0	0	5
89	Stean Pienaar	Golden Lions U19	1	0	0	0	5
89	Gerard Pieterse	Western Province U19	1	0	0	0	5
89	Gary Porter	Western Province U19	1	0	0	0	5
89	Tiaan Schmulian	Free State U19	1	0	0	0	5
89	Henry Searle	Leopards U19	1	0	0	0	5
89	Ulric Sellar	Sharks U19	1	0	0	0	5
89	Henry Slabbert	Free State U19	1	0	0	0	5
89	Henco Smit	Golden Lions U19	1	0	0	0	5
89	Eli Snyman	Blue Bulls U19	1	0	0	0	5
89	Francois Stemmet	Leopards U19	1	0	0	0	5
89	Ruben Terblanche	Western Province U19	1	0	0	0	5
89	Dominik Uytenbogaardt	Eastern Province U19	1	0	0	0	5
89	Christie van der Merwe	Sharks U19	1	0	0	0	5
89	Kenny van Niekerk	Golden Lions U19	1	0	0	0	5
115	Andri Cooper	Blue Bulls U19	0	1	0	0	2
115	Thabiso Khanye	Free State U19	0	1	0	0	2
–	penalty try	Blue Bulls U19	1	0	0	0	5
–	penalty try	Eastern Province U19	1	0	0	0	5
* Legend: T = Tries, C = Conversions, P = Penalties, DG = Drop Goals, Pts = Points.

=== Squads ===
The teams released the following squad lists:

2015 Blue Bulls U19 squad
Forwards
Backs

Jaco Bezuidenhout • Wynand de Necker • Aston Fortuin • JD Fourie • Arnold Gerber • Rohan Goosen • Jangqo Hennings • Denzel Hill • Jaco Holtzhausen • Madot Mabokela • Justin Meintjies • Sam Mitchell • Nico Peyper • Eli Snyman • Hendré Stassen • Franco van den Berg • Gavin van den Berg • Dean van der Westhuizen • Salmon van Huyssteen • Luigy van Jaarsveld • Alandré van Rooyen • Did not play: • Jan-Henning Campher • DP du Plessis • Devon Henson • Hamish Hughes • Tiny Mukhari • Adrian Parsons • PJ Toerien • Ruben van Heerden • Sven van Niekerk

Andri Cooper • Jerry Danquah • Ruan de Beer • Tinus de Beer • Corné de Klerk • Stephan Enslin • Dale Hendricks • JT Jackson • Tshepiso Mahasha • Franco Naudé • Brendan Owen • Coneree Poole • Curtley Prins • Divan Rossouw • Kurt Webster • Maurice White • Did not play: • Ruben de Vos • Arno Maree • Nkosikona Ntebe • Embrose Papier • Keanen Tarentaal

2015 Eastern Province U19 squad
Forwards

Lusanda Badiyana • Tango Balekile • Keegan Branford • Wihan Coetzer • Michael de Marco • Matt Howes • Craig Hume • Greg Jackson • Rob Lyons • Masikane Mazwi • Kuhle Mokhoabane • Mihlali Mosi • SF Nieuwoudt • NJ Oosthuizen • Junior Pokomela • Hayden Tharratt • Roché van Zyl • Xandré Vos • Did not play: • Stefan Janse van Vuuren • Jason Lizamore • Pieter Swanepoel • Mike van Brede

Backs

Michael Botha • Michael Brink • Davron Cameron • Austin Fredericks • James Hall • Avelo Jubase • Jordan Koekemoer • Xolisa Matshoba • Garrick Mattheus • Athi Mayinje • Sibusiso Ngcokovane • Yamkela Nyalambisa • Jacquis Oosthuizen • Mabhutana Peter • Dominik Uytenbogaardt • Keanu Vers • Jeremy Ward • Did not play: • Rivan Lemmer

tbc

Sage Hayman

2015 Free State U19 squad
Forwards

De Wet Bezuidenhout • Nardus Bosman • Janu Botha • Erich de Jager • Tiaan Erasmus • Thornton Ford • Kanya Gela • JC Jansen van Vuuren • Alex Jonker • Thabiso Khanye • Musa Mahlasela • Victor Maruping • Wilhelm Nebe • Daniel Nyamugama • Kaden Prince • Ig Prinsloo • Rohan Roelofse • Ruben Schoeman • Henry Slabbert • Robin Stevens • Brendan Verster • Did not play: • Willem Cornelius Augustyn • Austin de Bruyn • FC Jansen van Rensburg • Kian Skippers • Clinton Moloi • Lohan Potgieter • Tiaan Schutte • Frederik Spies

Backs

Shirwin Cupido • Carlo de Nysschen • Glen Eriksen • Llewellyn Hein • Julian Jordaan • Paul Kloppers • Dale Koopman • Tiisetso Madonsela • Christiaan Nel • Diederik Oberholzer • Charl Pretorius • Tiaan Schmulian • Niell Stannard • Marco Vermeulen • Ruan Wasserman • Dwayne Wessels • Did not play: • Dian Badenhorst • Jeandre Christian • Muller Joubert • Patric Mbangi • Riandri Muller • JP Steyn • Wickus Strauss • Steyn Swart

tbc

Johann Evert Bernard Cilliers • Martin Reynard de Villiers • Stefan Jacobs • Els Erhard Macdonald • Petrus Nienaber • Daniel Benjamin Oosthuizen • Jaco Potgieter • Christiaan Troskie • Pieter Johannes Joubert van Zyl

2015 Golden Lions U19 squad
Forwards
Backs

Le Roux Baard • Driaan Bester • Stephen Bhasera • Herman Britz • Jo-Hanko de Villiers • Gavin Delport • Kevin du Randt • Mitchell Fraser • Rhyno Herbst • Len Massyn • Juandré Michau • Morné Moos • Gert Mulder • Mac Muller • Reinhard Nothnagel • Anton Smit • Henco Smit • Sarel Smith • Koos Tredoux • Kenny van Niekerk • James Venter • Tijde Visser • Did not play: • Juan Lemmer • Basil Polydorou

Justin Bhana • Wynand Botha • Paul de Beer • Tristan Eve • Marco Jansen van Vuren • Curtis Jonas • Jaydrin Kotze • Arno Maree • Hendrik Mulder • Nazo Nkala • Stean Pienaar • Barend Smit • Tshepo Thulo • Hanno van Tonder • Boeta Vermaak • Did not play: • AJ van Blerk • Martin van Wyk

2015 Leopards U19 squad
Forwards
Backs

Kevin Booth • Roy Brink • Eon Buhrmann • Markus Coetzer • Zandré du Plessis • Gavin Foster • Arné Grobbelaar • Ruan Groenewald • Edward Haas • Robert Hunt • Dieter Leicher • Nicky Manzini • Tshego Moloto • Brendan O'Donoghue • Jacques Oosthuizen • Boeta Piater • Henry Searle • Bhekisa Shongwe • Adrian Snyman • Francois Stemmet • Jakobus van Breda • Willem van Schalkwyk • Danie van Wyk • Roodt van Zyl • Did not play: • Jaco Swanepoel

Armand Buys • Marco Donges • Eddie Engelbrecht • Wilbri Gunter • Benhard Janse van Rensburg • Tokkie Kasselman • Milani Lubelwana • Tapiwa Mafura • Siya Masuku • Nkosana Mathaba • Andile Mbingo • Ansten Mokgokolo • Zweli Silaule • Fenton Smit • De Wet Terblanche • Jan van der Merwe • Juandré van der Walt • Stefan van Vuuren • Did not play: • Rashard Fuller • Waldo Kriel • Thabang Phatudi • Ruan Stander

2015 Sharks U19 squad
Forwards
Backs

Rowan Coetzer • Tanner Dunnett • Armand Grobler • Bernardus Haring • Erich Kankowski • Christopher Klopper • Qthon Lombard • Dunran MacDonald • Cameron McNab • Michael Meyer • Kabelo Motloung • Bradley Roberts • Ulric Sellar • Ruan Smook • Christie van der Merwe • John Vorster • Wentzel Vorster • Rikus Zwart • Did not play: • Petrus du Buson • Haven Honiball • Nicolas Ihlenfeldt • Robin Johannes • Lungelo Mthethwa • Tristan Pickering • Robert Small • Pierre van der Walt

Wikus Badenhorst • Tristan Blewett • Brent Christoffels • Divan Fick • Jasper Genis • Morné Joubert • Jaywinn Juries • Duran Krummeck • Chris Lines • Snish Mpontshane • Steph Nel • S'busiso Nkosi • Kyle Rhode • Gervin Rossouw • Tristan Tedder • Frans Thysse • Alwayno Visagie • Did not play: • Michael Bauer • Branden Holder • NP Linde • Robin Sammy • Karl Terblanche

2015 Western Province U19 squad
Forwards
Backs

Iver Aanhuizen • Saud Abrahams • Jacques Bodenstein • Ruan Brits • Mitchell Carstens • Jaco Coetzee • Mervano da Silva • CF du Toit • Adriaan Geldenhuys • Brenton Greaves • Jerome Korf • Michael Kumbirai • Derick Marais • Daniël Maree • Nathan Meilhon • Percy Mngadi • Jacques Oosthuizen • Gary Porter • Carl Prinsloo • Ruben Terblanche • Keagan Timm • Jaco Willemse • Jacques van Zyl • Eduard Zandberg • Did not play: • Heinrich Basson • Conal Brown • Emil Cloete • Jaco Erasmus • Brenden Esterhuizen • Alex Goldstein • HJ Luus • Jordan Martin • Nyasha Tarusenga • Roodt van Zyl • Samson Zimande

Kurt-Lee Arendse • Aidynn Cupido • Paul de Wet • Justin Heunis • Herschel Jantjies • Eduan Keyter • Gerard Pieterse • Duncan Saal • Wayne Smith • Tiaan Swanepoel • Edwill van der Merwe • Edrich Venter • Did not play: • Ibrahim Adams • Michael Andrade • Robrecht Bruneel • Zandré de Koker • DP de Lange • Carlton Fortune • Graham Hendricks • Kuziwa Kazembe • Jez Macintyre • Rouche Nel • Wayne Parker • Robbie Petzer • Damian Rawstorne • Chris Smit • Danrich Visagie

=== Discipline ===
The following table contains all the cards handed out during the tournament:

Cards
Player	Team	Sent off (straight red)	Temporarily suspended
Tristan Blewett	Sharks U19	1	2
Bernardus Haring	Sharks U19	1	0
SF Nieuwoudt	Eastern Province U19	0	3
Charl Pretorius	Free State U19	0	2
Gavin van den Berg	Blue Bulls U19	0	2
Saud Abrahams	Western Province U19	0	1
Tango Balekile	Eastern Province U19	0	1
De Wet Bezuidenhout	Free State U19	0	1
Herman Britz	Golden Lions U19	0	1
Mitchell Carstens	Western Province U19	0	1
Jaco Coetzee	Western Province U19	0	1
Paul de Wet	Western Province U19	0	1
Stephan Enslin	Blue Bulls U19	0	1
Tiaan Erasmus	Free State U19	0	1
Mitchell Fraser	Golden Lions U19	0	1
Jasper Genis	Sharks U19	1	2
James Hall	Eastern Province U19	0	1
Jungqo Hennings	Blue Bulls U19	0	1
Julian Jordaan	Free State U19	0	1
Justin Meintjies	Blue Bulls U19	0	1
Juandré Michau	Golden Lions U19	0	1
Franco Naudé	Blue Bulls U19	0	1
Nazo Nkala	Golden Lions U19	0	1
Coneree Poole	Blue Bulls U19	0	1
Tiaan Schmulian	Free State U19	0	1
Hendré Stassen	Blue Bulls U19	0	1
Christie van der Merwe	Sharks U19	1	2
Edrich Venter	Western Province U19	0	1
Brendan Verster	Free State U19	0	1
Alwayno Visagie	Sharks U19	1	2
Tijde Visser	Golden Lions U19	0	1
* Legend: (red card) = Sent off, (yellow card) = Sin-binned

== Referees ==
The following referees officiated matches in the 2015 Under-19 Provincial Championship Group A:

- Rodney Boneparte
- Gerrie de Bruin
- Stephan Geldenhuys
- Quinton Immelman
- Jabian Jeftha
- Jaco Kotze
- Pieter Maritz
- Vusi Msibi
- Eduan Nel
- Jacques Nieuwenhuis
- Sindile Ngcese
- Tahla Ntshakaza
- Francois Pretorius
- Jaco Pretorius
- Oregopotse Rametsi
- Archie Sehlako
- Ricus van der Hoven
- Lourens van der Merwe
- Renier Vermeulen
- Kurt Weaver

== See also ==
- Currie Cup
- 2015 Currie Cup Premier Division
- 2015 Currie Cup First Division
- 2015 Under-21 Provincial Championship Group A
- 2015 Under-21 Provincial Championship Group B
- 2015 Under-19 Provincial Championship Group B
