= Lusanda Badiyana =

South African rugby union player

- Born: 1 September 1996 (age 30) East London, South Africa
- Height: 1.82 m (5 ft 11 1/2 in)
- Weight: 110 kg (240 lb; 17 st 5 lb)
- School: Cambridge High School
- University: Nelson Mandela Metropolitan University

Rugby union career
- Position: Number eight / Lock / Flanker
- Current team: Southern Kings
Youth career
- 2014: Border Bulldogs
- 2015–2017: Eastern Province Kings
Senior career
Years	Team	Apps	(Points)
2016–2018	Eastern Province Elephants	19	(15)
2018	Southern Kings	4	(0)
- Correct as of 13 July 2018

Lusanda Badiyana (born 1 September 1996) is a South African rugby union player for the Southern Kings in the Pro14. His regular position is eighth man, but he can also play as a flanker or a lock.

== Rugby career ==
=== 2014: Border ===
Badiyana was born and grew up in East London, where he also attended Cambridge High School. In 2014, he was selected to represent the East London-based Border Bulldogs at the Under-18 Academy Week in Worcester, where he made three starts to help his side to two victories at the tournament.

=== 2015–2016: Eastern Province Kings ===
After school, Badiyana moved to Port Elizabeth to join the Eastern Province Kings academy. He was named the vice-captain of the Eastern Province U19 squad that competed in the 2015 Under-19 Provincial Championship, leading the team on occasion when regular captain Jeremy Ward was unavailable. Badiyana missed just one match all season, starting in eleven of their twelve matches during the regular season. He was mostly used as a lock during the campaign, and he scored tries in matches against Golden Lions U19, Sharks U19 and Leopards U19 to help his team finish top of the log, winning eleven of their twelve matches to qualify for the semi-finals. Badiyana started their 31–15 victory over Free State U19, as well as in the final, as they beat the Blue Bulls U19s – the only team to beat them all season – 25–23 in Johannesburg to win the Under-19 Provincial Championship for the first time in their history.

In March 2016, Badiyana was included in a South Africa Under-20 training squad as they prepared for the 2016 World Rugby Under 20 Championship tournament to be held in Manchester, England. However, he failed to make the cut for a reduced provisional squad named a week later, instead linking up with the Eastern Province Kings squad that participated in the 2016 Currie Cup qualification series. He did not feature in any of their first five matches of the season, but made his first class debut by coming on as a replacement in their 10–50 defeat to Western Province on 14 May 2016. He made his first start a week later in a 15–35 defeat to a Free State XV and remained in the squad for the remainder of the competition, making a total of seven starts and two appearances off the bench. Badiyana scored his first senior try in his sixth appearance for the Eastern Province Kings in their 12–29 defeat to Griquas, and scored a second in their final match of the season, a 26–59 defeat to the Falcons. Badiyana's debut season in first class rugby ended in disappointing fashion, as the team finished second-bottom on the log, with just two victories in their fourteen matches.

At the end of the 2016 season, Badiyana reverted to the Eastern Province U21 team, where he started in victories over Sharks U21 and Free State U21 in the 2016 Under-21 Provincial Championship. Eastern Province U21 won just one more match, however, and finished the season in fifth place, just missing out on the play-off semi-finals. After the season, Badiyana had a trial with the Southern Kings Super Rugby team and he was included in their squad for the 2017 Super Rugby season.
