= Barberton High School =

Barberton High School may refer to:

- Barberton High School (Ohio), United States
- Barberton High School, Mpumalanga, South Africa
