= Benhard Janse van Rensburg =

English rugby union player

- Full name: Benhard Johannes Janse van Rensburg
- Born: 14 January 1997 (age 29) Pretoria, South Africa
- Height: 1.88 m (6 ft 2 in)
- Weight: 102 kg (225 lb; 16 st 1 lb)
- School: Hoërskool Frikkie Meyer, Thabazimbi
- University: North-West University

Rugby union career
- Position: Centre / Fly-half / Fullback
- Current team: Bristol Bears
Youth career
- 2014: Limpopo Blue Bulls
- 2015: Leopards
- 2016–2017: Sharks
Amateur team(s)
Years	Team	Apps	(Points)
2016	NWU Pukke	9	(34)
Senior career
Years	Team	Apps	(Points)
2016	Leopards	10	(32)
2017	Sharks XV	7	(19)
2017	Sharks	3	(2)
2017	Sharks (Currie Cup)	5	(2)
2017–2018	→ Southern Kings	5	(4)
2018	Free State XV	10	(34)
2018–2020	Free State Cheetahs	10	(27)
2018–2020	Cheetahs	34	(35)
2021	NEC Green Rockets	9	(12)
2021–2023	London Irish	53	(77)
2023–present	Bristol Bears	71	(92)
- Correct as of 19 July 2026
International career
Years	Team	Apps	(Points)
2016	South Africa Under-20	1	(0)
2025	Barbarians	1	(0)
2026–	England	2	(5)
- Correct as of 19 July 2026

Benhard Johannes Janse van Rensburg (born 14 January 1997) is a professional rugby union player for Bristol Bears in PREM Rugby. He is a utility back that plays primarily as a centre but can also play as a fly-half or fullback. At international level he represents the England national team having qualified on residency.

== Club career ==
=== 2014 : Schoolboy rugby ===
Janse van Rensburg was born in Pretoria and grew up in Thabazimbi. In 2014, he was selected to represent the Limpopo Blue Bulls at the premier high school rugby union competition in South Africa, the Under-18 Craven Week.

=== 2015–2016 : Leopards, NWU Pukke and South Africa Under-20 ===
He moved to Potchefstroom at the start of 2015, joining their provincial team, the Leopards. He made twelve starts for the Leopards U19 team in the 2015 Under-19 Provincial Championship, starting five matches at inside centre, five at outside centre and two at fullback. He scored tries in matches against Eastern Province U19, Sharks U19 and Western Province U19 and also kicked fourteen conversions and three penalties for a total of 52 points, the second-highest points tally for a Leopards player and tenth overall in Group A of the competition.

Janse van Rensburg represented the NWU Pukke in the 2016 Varsity Cup, where he made history in their opening match against the UP Tuks; the Varsity Cup adopted a points system whereby tries that originate within a team's own half were worth nine points, and Janse van Rensburg scored the first nine-point try in the competition after just nine minutes. He scored a second try in the match, a 38–15 victory for NWU Pukke, and two more in matches against the NMMU Madibaz (another nine-pointer) and Maties to finish as his side's second-highest try scorer.

In March 2016, Janse van Rensburg was included in a South Africa Under-20 training squad, but wasn't initially included in the final South Africa Under-20 squad for the 2016 World Rugby Under 20 Championship tournament to be held in Manchester, England. However, following injuries to S'busiso Nkosi and Embrose Papier during the tournament, he flew out to meet up with the rest of the team. He came on as a replacement in their final match of the tournament, the third-place play-off against Argentina. Argentina beat South Africa for the second time, convincingly winning 49–19 to condemn South Africa to fourth place in the competition.

Shortly before his involvement in the World Rugby Under 20 Championship, he also made his first class debut in South African domestic rugby. He started their Currie Cup qualification match against the Falcons, helping them to a 26–24 victory. After another start against the SWD Eagles, he dropped to the bench for their match against the Boland Cavaliers, but came on to score his first points in first class rugby, converting two late tries. He started five more matches in the fly-half position before his short spell with the South Africa Under-20 team, without scoring any points. On his return, he made two more starts; in the first of those, he scored a total 13 points – including his first senior try – in his side's 23–26 defeat to a Sharks XV, and a week later, he scored a try and five conversions in a 54–14 victory over the Eastern Province Kings.

=== 2016–2017 : Sharks ===
Midway through 2016, Janse van Rensburg joined the Durban-based Sharks. He was included in their squad for the 2016 Currie Cup Premier Division, but didn't feature for the team, instead making two appearances for the Sharks U21 in the 2016 Under-21 Provincial Championship. At the end of October 2016, he was included in the Sharks Super Rugby squad for the 2017 season.

=== 2023– : Bristol Bears ===
Following the collapse of London Irish into administration, Janse van Rensburg was signed by PREM Rugby side Bristol Bears. In May 2024, following an impressive season he was named in the Premiership Rugby Team of the Season for the 2023–24 campaign.

On 8 December 2024, in the opening round of the 2024–25 Champions Cup against finalists from the previous year, Leinster, starting fly half AJ MacGinty sustained an injury early in the first half forcing Janse van Rensburg to move into the role. Despite scoring one of his two attempted conversions, Bristol went on to lose 35–12 at home. At the end of that season he scored a try during their league semi-final playoff defeat against Bath. Later that year in November 2025 he extended his club contract.

== International career ==
Despite being born in South Africa, Janse van Rensburg became eligible to represent England on residency grounds from summer 2026 with England head coach Steve Borthwick having reportedly been interested in capping him.

On 18 May 2026, Janse van Rensburg was named in a three day training camp with England ahead of the inaugural Nations Championship. On 11 July 2026 he scored a try on his debut with his first touch as an England International in the 34th minute of a Test against Fiji at Hill Dickinson Stadium, after coming on in the 32nd minute as a replacement centre.

== Career statistics ==
=== List of international tries ===
as of 11 July 2026

No.	Date	Venue	Opponent	Score	Result	Competition	Ref.
1	11 July 2026	Hill Dickinson Stadium, Liverpool, England	Fiji	26–3	73–8	2026 Nations Championship	
