= Junior Pokomela =

South African rugby union player

- Full name: Junior Sipato Pokomela
- Born: 10 December 1996 (age 29) Port Elizabeth, South Africa
- Height: 1.90 m (6 ft 3 in)
- Weight: 108 kg (238 lb; 17 st 0 lb)
- School: Grey High School, Port Elizabeth
- University: Nelson Mandela University

Rugby union career
- Position: Loose forward
- Current team: Stormers / Western Province
Youth career
- 2012–2016: Eastern Province Kings
Amateur team(s)
Years	Team	Apps	(Points)
2016	NMMU Madibaz	4	(7)
Senior career
Years	Team	Apps	(Points)
2016	Eastern Province Kings	3	(0)
2017–2021	Cheetahs	48	(45)
2017	Free State XV	7	(5)
2017–2021	Free State Cheetahs	23	(20)
2021–2024	Stormers	28	(35)
2022–2024	Western Province	4	(0)
- Correct as of 23 July 2022
International career
Years	Team	Apps	(Points)
2014	South Africa Schools	1	(0)
2016	South Africa Under-20	5	(0)
- Correct as of 22 April 2018

Junior Sipato Pokomela (born 10 December 1996) is a South African professional rugby union player for the Stormers in the United Rugby Championship and Western Province in the Currie Cup. His regular position is loose forward.

== Rugby career ==
=== 2012–14: Under-16 and Under-18 rugby ===
Pokomela earned his first provincial selection in 2012, when he represented Eastern Province at the Under-16 Grant Khomo Week held in Johannesburg, starting all three of their matches in the tournament.

In 2014, Pokomela was selected to represent Eastern Province at the premier schools tournament in South Africa, the Under-18 Craven Week, held in Middelburg, once again starting all three of their matches in the tournament. At the conclusion of the tournament, Pokomela was included in a South Africa Schools squad. He was an unused replacement in their 40–15 victory over Wales, but started their next match as they suffered a 22–30 defeat to England.

=== 2015: Eastern Province Under-19 ===
In 2015, Pokomela joined the Eastern Province academy; he was included in the Eastern Province U19 squad that participated in Group A of the 2015 Under-19 Provincial Championship. He immediately established himself as the first choice Eighth man for the team, starting all fourteen of their matches during the competition. He scored two tries in their match against Free State U19 in a 29–10 victory in Port Elizabeth and scored further tries in their matches against Free State U19 in Bloemfontein, Leopards U19, Blue Bulls U19, Sharks U19 and Western Province U19 to help his side top the log, winning eleven of their twelve matches and qualifying for home advantage in the semi-final. Pokomela scored his fourth try in three matches against Free State in a 31–15 semi-final victory to see his team reach the final. Although he didn't score in the final, he played the entire 70 minutes of a 25–23 victory over Blue Bulls U19 to help his side become champions for the first time in their history.

=== 2016: Super Rugby, Varsity Cup and Currie Cup qualification ===
On 13 December 2015, Pokomela was included on a list of 20 players released by the South African Rugby Union that would be part of the Southern Kings squad for the 2016 Super Rugby season.

Pokomela wasn't utilised at the start of the competition, instead playing in the 2016 Varsity Cup competition with the NMMU Madibaz. He started four of their matches and scored a try in their 46–33 victory over UCT Ikey Tigers in a season that saw NMMU finish in seventh position in the league.

Following serious financial problems at the Eastern Province Kings at the end of the 2015 season which saw a number of first team regular leave the union, Pokomela was among a number of youngsters that were promoted to the squad that competed in the 2016 Currie Cup qualification series, He was named in the starting lineup for their first match of the season against the SWD Eagles and played the entire 80 minutes of a 14–37 defeat.

In March 2016, Pokomela was included in a South Africa Under-20 training squad, and made the cut to be named in a reduced provisional squad a week later. On 10 May 2016, he was included in the final squad for the 2016 World Rugby Under 20 Championship tournament to be held in Manchester, England, also being named vice-captain of the team. He started in their opening match in Pool C of the tournament as South Africa came from behind to beat Japan 59–19. He also started their other two pool matches as South Africa were beaten 13–19 by Argentina in their second match, but bounced back to secure a 40-31 bonus-point victory over France in their final pool match to secure a semi-final place as the best runner-up in the competition. He retained his starting spot in the play-offs, as South Africa faced three-time champions England in the semi-finals, but the hosts proved too strong for South Africa, knocking them out of the competition with a 39–17 victory. Following captain Jeremy Ward being handed a two-week ban for a dangerous tackle against England, Pokomela captained the side against Argentina in the third-place play-off final. Argentina beat South Africa – as they did in the pool stages – convincingly winning 49–19 and in the process condemning South Africa to fourth place in the competition.
