= James Hall (rugby union, born 1996) =

South African rugby union player

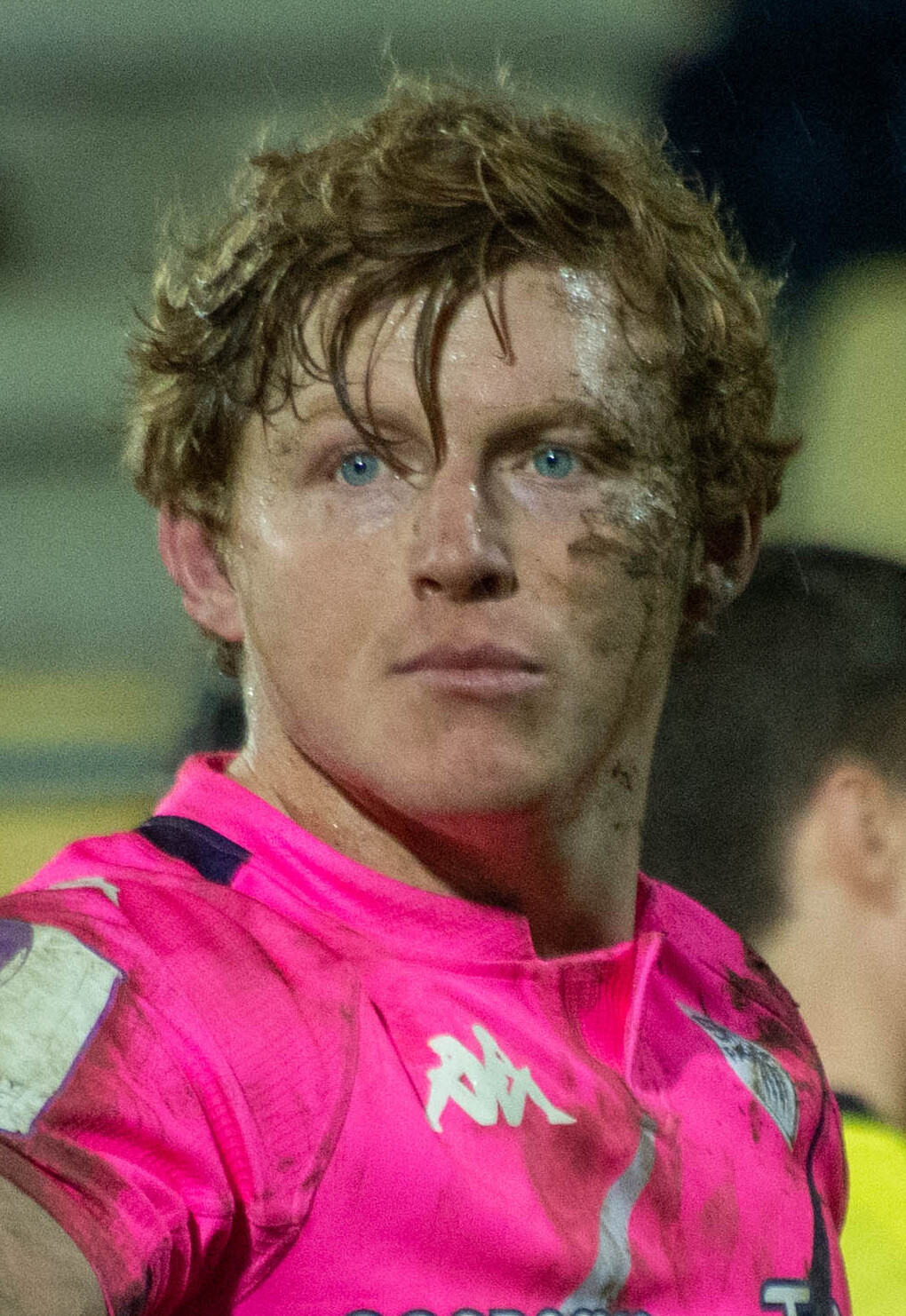
- Full name: James Robert Hall
- Born: 2 January 1996 (age 30) Durban, South Africa
- Height: 1.73 m (5 ft 8 in)
- Weight: 88 kg (194 lb; 13 st 12 lb)
- School: Kearsney College, Botha's Hill
- Occupation: professional rugby player

Rugby union career
- Position: Scrum-half
- Current team: USA Perpignan
Youth career
- 2009–2014: Sharks
- 2014–2015: Eastern Province Kings
- 2016: Oyonnax
Senior career
Years	Team	Apps	(Points)
2016	Southern Kings	7	(10)
2016–2019	Oyonnax	76	(62)
2019–2023	Stade Français	90	(44)
2023–2024	Racing 92	3	(0)
2024–present	USA Perpignan	22	(0)
- Correct as of 30 July 2025
International career
Years	Team	Apps	(Points)
2016	South Africa Under-20	5	(0)
- Correct as of 30 July 2025

James Robert Hall (born 2 January 1996 in Durban, South Africa) is a South African rugby union player for Stade Français in the French Top 14. His regular position is scrum-half.

== Playing career ==
=== Youth ===
Hall earned provincial selection as early as primary school level, when he represented KwaZulu-Natal at the 2009 Under-13 Craven Week held in Kimberley. He was the main kicker for the side and kicked five penalties during the competition, including three in their match against the Golden Lions.

At high school level, Hall attended Kearsney College, where he played rugby for their first team. He kicked a 62-meter penalty in a high school match against Westville Boys' High School in March 2014, with video footage of the kick appearing on several websites, both nationally and internationally. He earned a provincial call-up for the 2014 Under-18 Craven Week competition held in Middelburg, scoring one try for KwaZulu-Natal in their match against the Blue Bulls. He signed a contract to join Port Elizabeth-based union the Eastern Province Kings after school, and made a single appearance for their Under-19 side during the 2014 Under-19 Provincial Championship, in a 21–24 defeat to his hometown side the Sharks U19s in Durban.

He joined the EP Kings on a full-time basis for the 2015 season and he was a key member of the Eastern Province U19 side in the 2015 Under-19 Provincial Championship Group A, starting all fourteen of their matches in the competition. He scored one try during the season – in a 33–14 victory over the Leopards U19s – and also kicked nine conversions and seven penalties during the season for a personal points haul of 44 points, the second-highest in the team and joint-twelfth overall. He helped the Eastern Province Kings Under-19 side to eleven wins in their twelve matches in the group stage of the competition to finish top of the log to secure a place in the title play-offs. He started in their semi-final match against the Free State U19s, helping them to a 31–15 victory, and also in the final, where his side ran out 25–23 winners over the Blue Bulls U19s in Johannesburg to win the competition for the first time in their history.

=== Kings ===
On 13 December 2015, Hall was included on a list of 20 players released by the South African Rugby Union that would be part of the Southern Kings squad for the 2016 Super Rugby season. He made his first class and Super Rugby debut in the Kings' match against the Bulls in Round Seven of the competition, starting in a 6–38 defeat in Port Elizabeth. He also started in a match against the Lions and played off the bench in their 27–73 defeat to Argentine side the Jaguares. He made his fourth appearance and third start at home to New Zealand side the Blues in a match that saw him score his first try in first class rugby, scoring against the base of the posts in the 14th minute of an 18–34 loss.

=== South Africa Under-20 ===
In March 2016, Hall was included in a South Africa Under-20 training squad, and made the cut to be named in a reduced provisional squad a week later. On 10 May 2016, he was included in the final squad for the 2016 World Rugby Under 20 Championship tournament to be held in Manchester, England. He started their opening match in Pool C of the tournament as South Africa came from behind to beat Japan 59–19, and their next pool match as South Africa were beaten 13–19 by Argentina. He played off the bench as South Africa bounced back to secure a 40-31 bonus-point victory over France in their final pool match to secure a semi-final place as the best runner-up in the competition. He was also used as a replacement in both play-off matches, as South Africa faced three-time champions England in the semi-finals – with the hosts proving too strong for South Africa, knocking them out of the competition with a 39–17 victory – and against Argentina in the third-place play-off final. Argentina beat South Africa – as they did in the pool stages – convincingly winning 49–19 and in the process condemning South Africa to fourth place in the competition.

=== Oyonnax ===
In 2016, French Rugby Pro D2 side Oyonnax announced the signing of Hall on a three-year contract.

=== Stade Français ===
Hall joined Stade Français on a two-year deal prior to the 2019–20 season.

=== Racing 92 ===
Hall joined Racing 92 on a two-year from 2023–24 season.
