= Divan Rossouw =

Namibian rugby union player (born 1996)

- Born: 12 March 1996 (age 30) Windhoek, Namibia
- Height: 1.87 m (6 ft 1 1/2 in)
- Weight: 92 kg (14 st 7 lb; 203 lb)
- School: Windhoek Gymnasium
- University: University of Pretoria

Rugby union career
- Position: Utility back
Youth career
- 2009–2014: Namibia
- 2015–2017: Blue Bulls
Senior career
Years	Team	Apps	(Points)
2016–2018	Blue Bulls XV	20	(27)
2016–2020	Blue Bulls	16	(5)
2018–2020	Bulls	36	(20)
2020–2022	Lions	5	(0)
2020–2022	Golden Lions	3	(10)
2022–2023	Krasny Yar Krasnoyarsk	?	(?)
2023–	Seattle Seawolves	35	(70)
- Correct as of 14 August 2025
International career
Years	Team	Apps	(Points)
2015	Namibia Under-20	4	(15)
2022–	Namibia	7	(10)
- Correct as of 14 August 2025

Divan Rossouw (born 12 March 1996) is a Namibian rugby union player, currently playing for the Seattle Seawolves in Major League Rugby. He is a utility back that can play as a fullback, winger, centre or scrum-half.

== Rugby career ==
=== 2009–2014: Youth rugby / Namibia ===
Rossouw was born and grew up in Windhoek. He was selected to represent Namibia as early as primary school level, playing at the South African Under-13 Craven Week tournament held in Kimberley in 2009, starting in the scrum-half position and helping them to one victory in their match against Zimbabwe.

In 2012, he appeared for Namibia at the Under-16 Grant Khomo Week held in Johannesburg. He played all their matches at outside centre and he contributed 15 points in their 30–13 victory over Zimbabwe, scoring one try, two conversions and two penalties to finish as his side's top scorer in the tournament.

He again represented Namibia in 2014 in South Africa's premier rugby union competition for high schools, the Under-18 Craven Week tournament held in Middelburg. He scored two tries from the outside centre in their 69–0 victory over Border Country Districts in their second match, and a further two tries from fullback in their final match against Zimbabwe, finishing the tournament as Namibia's top try scorer, just one try behind the joint-top try scorers in the competition.

=== 2015–present: Blue Bulls / Bulls ===
Rossouw moved to South Africa prior to the 2015 to join the academy of the Pretoria-based side the Blue Bulls. He made eleven starts for the Blue Bulls U19 team during the 2015 Under-19 Provincial Championship, starting six matches on the left wing and five at fullback. He scored nine tries during the competition; after single tries in matches against Eastern Province, Free State (away), Leopards, Western Province and Free State (home), he scored two tries in their match against the Sharks. One more try followed during the regular season against Eastern Province as the Blue Bulls finished the season in second position on the log to qualify for a home semi-final. Rossouw scored his final try of the season in his side's 30–29 victory over Western Province U19 in the semi-final, but he could not help them to a victory in the final, with Eastern Province U19 winning 25–23 in Johannesburg. Rossouw's nine tries meant he was the third-highest try scorer in Group A of the competition behind the Leopards' Zweli Silaule and Rossouw's team-mate Franco Naudé. In addition to his eleven appearances in the Under-19 competition, Rossouw also made two appearances for the Blue Bulls U21 team in 2015, scoring one try in their 55–33 victory over the Leopards.

Rossouw was included in the Blue Bulls squad for the 2016 Currie Cup qualification series and he made his first class debut in their Round Six match against the Pumas, coming on as a replacement just after the hour mark of a 13–25 defeat. He was named the starting right winger for their next match, a 38–39 defeat to Griquas in Kimberley, before playing on the left wing against the Leopards a week later. He kicked a conversion in their 57–28 the following week, to score his first points of his senior career, as started that match at fullback. He was to remain in that position for the remainder of the competition, scoring his first senior try in a 28–23 victory over SWD Eagles and following that up with tries against the Boland Cavaliers and the team from his home country, the Welwitschias. He made a total of ten appearances as he helped the Blue Bulls to seventh place on the log. In the second half of the season, Rossouw made five starts for the Blue Bulls U21 team in the 2016 Under-21 Provincial Championship, scoring a try in their match against Free State U21 as the Blue Bulls finished third before losing 15–37 to trans-Jukskei rivals the Golden Lions in the semi-finals. Rossouw also made two appearances in the 2016 Currie Cup Premier Division, South Africa's premier domestic competition, coming on as a replacement in matches against the Pumas and Boland Cavaliers.

In November 2016, he was named in the Bulls Super Rugby team's extended training squad during the team's preparations for the 2017 Super Rugby season.

== Honours ==
Seattle Sea Wolves

- All Major League Ruby first team (2025)
