= Jaco Coetzee (rugby union, born 1996) =

South African rugby union player

- Full name: Abraham Jacobus Coetzee
- Born: 10 June 1996 (age 30) Pretoria, South Africa
- Height: 1.89 m (6 ft 2 1/2 in)
- Weight: 108 kg (238 lb; 17 st 0 lb)
- School: Glenwood High School

Rugby union career
- Position: Number eight / Flanker
- Current team: Bath Rugby
Youth career
- 2013–2014: Sharks
- 2015–2017: Western Province
Senior career
Years	Team	Apps	(Points)
2017–2021	Stormers	24	(15)
2017–2021	Western Province	36	(80)
2021–	Bath	59	(35)
- Correct as of 25 May 2025
International career
Years	Team	Apps	(Points)
2014	South Africa Schools	1	(0)
- Correct as of 18 April 2018

Abraham Jacobus Coetzee (born 10 June 1996) is a South African rugby union player for English Premiership side Bath Rugby. His regular position is number eight.

== Rugby career ==
=== 2013–2014: Youth rugby ===
Coetzee was born in Pretoria, but grew up in KwaZulu-Natal. He attended Glenwood High School, where he earned selections to represent KwaZulu-Natal at the premier high school rugby union tournament in South Africa, the Under-18 Craven Week in both 2013 and 2014. He scored one try in the 2013 event, in a 77–14 victory over Border, and scored three tries in 2014 – two in a 38–27 win over the Pumas and one in a 15–36 defeat to the Blue Bulls – in a tournament where he also captained the team. After the tournament, he was named in a South Africa Schools squad, also named captain of the team. He captained them to a victory over France in their first match, but sustained an ankle injury and missed the remaining two matches in the Under-18 International Series.

=== 2015–2016: Western Province Under-19 and Under-21 ===
After high school, Coetzee moved to Cape Town to join Western Province's academy. He scored four tries in eleven starts for the Western Province U19 team in the 2015 Under-19 Provincial Championship, and three tries in six starts for the Western Province U21 team in the 2016 Under-21 Provincial Championship.

=== 2017: Stormers ===
At the start of 2017, Coetzee was included in the squad for Western Province's affiliated Super Rugby team, the Stormers. He was named as a replacement for their third match of the season against the Southern Kings, and he came on in the 70th minute of the match to make his first class and Super Rugby debut.

=== 2021: Bath Rugby ===
In February 2021 it was confirmed that Coetzee would join English Premiership Rugby side Bath ahead of the 2021–22 season.
