= Keanu Vers =

South African rugby union player

- Full name: Keanu Armandio Vers
- Born: 4 February 1996 (age 30) Middelburg Midros, South Africa
- Height: 1.75 m (5 ft 9 in)
- Weight: 85 kg (187 lb; 13 st 5 lb)
- School: Grey High School, Port Elizabeth
- University: Nelson Mandela Metropolitan University

Rugby union career
- Position: Fullback / Winger / Centre
- Current team: Eastern Province Elephants
Youth career
- 2009–2017: Eastern Province Kings
Amateur team(s)
| Years | Team | Apps | (Points) |
| 2016 | NMMU Madibaz | 7 | (5) |
Senior career
| Years | Team | Apps | (Points) |
| 2016–2018 | Eastern Province Elephants | 22 | (35) |
| 2019 | Griquas | 2 | (0) |
| 2019 | Eastern Province Elephants | 7 | (25) |
| 2022– | Griffons | | |
- Correct as of 30 March 2022
International career
| Years | Team | Apps | (Points) |
| 2014 | South Africa Schools | 2 | (10) |
| 2016 | South Africa Under-20 | 2 | (0) |
- Correct as of 27 June 2016

Keanu Armandio Vers (born 4 February 1996) is a South African professional rugby union player for the Eastern Province Elephants in the Currie Cup. He is a utility back that can play as a fullback, winger or centre.

== Rugby career ==
=== 2009–14: Schools rugby ===
Vers represented his local provincial union, Eastern Province, at all youth levels throughout his school career. In 2009, he played for them at the Under-13 Craven Week tournament held in Kimberley, scoring tries in victories over the Golden Lions and KwaZulu-Natal. In 2012, he played for them at the Under-16 Grant Khomo Week, again scoring two tries during the tournament in matches against South Western Districts and Boland.

He was chosen to represent them at the foremost schools rugby union competition in South Africa, the Under-18 Craven Week, in both 2013 and 2014. In the 2013 event in Polokwane, Vers scored a try in a 29–18 victory over the Falcons and he kept up his record of scoring in each tournament when he got a try in their 19–5 victory over Free State in the 2014 tournament in Middelburg, helping Eastern Province to victories in all three of their matches, including a 25–7 win over South Western Districts in the main match on the final day to finish the tournament as unofficial champions.

After the tournament, Vers was also included in a South Africa Schools that participated in the Under-18 International Series against teams from France, Wales and England. He was an unused replacement in their 28–13 victory over France, but was promoted to the starting line-up for their 40–15 win over Wales in their second match. He retained his spot for their final match against England and repaid the faith by scoring two tries in the match, but still ended on the losing side as England won 30–22 in the match played in Stellenbosch.

=== 2015: Eastern Province Under-19 ===
Vers joined the Eastern Province Academy for 2015 and was included in the Eastern Province U19 squad that competed in Group A of the 2015 Under-219 Provincial Championship, their second season since winning promotion from Group B at the end of 2013. Vers' first appearance at this level came in a match against the Sharks U19 and he took just 47 minutes to score his first try in a 26–7 win. He scored another try in their next match against Golden Lions U19 and made three more starts, helping Eastern Province to finish top of the log, winning eleven of their twelve matches. He started their 31–15 win over Free State U19 in the semi-final and also started the final, playing the entire 80 minutes of their 25–23 victory over the Blue Bulls U19s, helping his side win the Under-19 Provincial Championship for the first time in their history.

=== 2016: NMMU Madibaz, Eastern Province Kings and South Africa Under-20 ===
At the start of 2016, Vers played in the 2016 Varsity Cup competition with NMMU Madibaz. He scored one try in their 19–46 defeat to the UFS Shimlas in a disappointing season for NMMU that saw them finish second-last in the competition. After the Varsity Cup, Vers joined an Eastern Province Kings side that suffered serious financial problems which saw a number of first team regulars leave the union and he was among a number of youngsters that were included in their squad for the 2016 Currie Cup qualification series. He was named in the starting lineup for their first match of the season against the SWD Eagles and made his first class debut by playing the first 50 minutes of the 14–37 defeat before being substituted. He was named on the bench for their third match of the season against the Border Bulldogs and came on as a replacement in the 56th minute.

However, he missed most of the competition due to his selection in the South Africa Under-20 squad. In March 2016, Vers was included in a South Africa Under-20 training squad, and made the cut to be named in a reduced provisional squad a week later. On 10 May 2016, he was included in the final squad for the 2016 World Rugby Under 20 Championship tournament to be held in Manchester, England. He came on as a replacement during their opening match in Pool C of the tournament as South Africa came from behind to beat Japan 59–19, before dropping out of the matchday squad for their next pool match as South Africa were beaten 13–19 by Argentina. He was an unused replacement in their final pool match as South Africa bounced back to secure a 40-31 bonus-point victory over France in their final pool match to secure a semi-final place as the best runner-up in the competition. He was also an unused as a replacement in the semi-final, as South Africa faced three-time champions England in the semi-finals, with the hosts proving too strong for South Africa, knocking them out of the competition with a 39–17 victory. He was again named on the bench against Argentina in the third-place play-off final, this time coming on for the final 20 minutes as Argentina beat South Africa – as they did in the pool stages – convincingly winning 49–19 and in the process condemning South Africa to fourth place in the competition.
