= Franco Naudé =

South African rugby union player (born 1996)

- Full name: Franco Johan Naudé
- Born: 28 March 1996 (age 30) Pretoria, South Africa
- Height: 1.88 m (6 ft 2 in)
- Weight: 102 kg (16 st 1 lb; 225 lb)
- School: Hoërskool Garsfontein
- University: University of Pretoria

Rugby union career
- Position: Centre
- Current team: Lokomotiv Penza
Youth career
- 2013–2017: Blue Bulls
Senior career
Years	Team	Apps	(Points)
2016–2019	Blue Bulls XV	15	(45)
2017–2019	Bulls	1	(0)
2017–2018	Blue Bulls	7	(5)
2019	→ Lions	6	(0)
2019	→ Golden Lions XV	3	(0)
2020–2021	Strela Kazan	6	(5)
2021–2022	VVA Podmoskovye	11	(15)
2022	Slava Moscow	10	(20)
2023–present	Lokomotiv Penza		
- Correct as of 2 March 2023
International career
Years	Team	Apps	(Points)
2016	South Africa Under-20	5	(0)
- Correct as of 13 April 2018

Franco Johan Naudé (born 28 March 1996) is a South African professional rugby union player for the Lokomotiv Penza in Russian Rugby Championship. His regular position is centre.

== Rugby career ==
=== 2013–2014: Schoolboy rugby ===
Naudé was born in Pretoria. He attended and playing rugby union at Hoërskool Garsfontein, where he was also selected to represent the Blue Bulls in the Under-18 Craven Week – South Africa's premier high school rugby union tournament – in both 2013 and 2014. He started all three matches in each tournament, scoring a try for the Blue Bulls in the 2013 tournament against KwaZulu-Natal.

=== 2015–2017: Youth rugby ===
After high school, Naudé joined the Blue Bulls' academy, He firmly established himself in the Blue Bulls U19 team, starting all fourteen of their matches in the 2015 Under-19 Provincial Championship. He scored eleven tries during the regular season – he scored two tries in matches against Sharks U21, Western Province U19 and Leopards and one try against Leopards U21 and Free State U19 before getting a hat-trick in their final match of the regular season in a 49–26 victory over top-of-the-table Eastern Province U19 to help the Blue Bulls secure second place on the log. He didn't score in their 30–29 victory over Western Province U19 in the semi-final or their 23–25 defeat to Eastern Province U19 in the final, but finished as his team's top try scorer, and second overall in Group A of the competition log behind the Leopards U21s' Zweli Silaule.

In March 2016, he was included in a South Africa Under-20 training squad, and made the cut in a reduced provisional squad a week later.

He was also named in the Blue Bulls squad for the 2016 Currie Cup qualification series and he made his first class debut on 8 April 2016, starting in their 16–30 defeat to Western Province in Round One of the competition, also starting their 17–38 defeat to Gauteng rivals the Golden Lions a fortnight later.

On 10 May 2016, he was included in the final South Africa Under-20 squad for the 2016 World Rugby Under 20 Championship tournament to be held in Manchester in England. He started their opening match in Pool C of the tournament on the bench, appearing for the final 25 minutes as South Africa came from behind to beat Japan 59–19. He started at inside centre for their second pool match, a 13–19 defeat to Argentina, and again found himself on the bench as South Africa bounced back to secure a 40-31 bonus-point victory over France in their final pool match. The result meant South Africa secured a semi-final place as the best runner-up in the competition, and Naudé again played off the bench in their semi-final match as they faced three-time champions England. The hosts proved too strong for South Africa, knocking them out of the competition with a 39–17 victory, and they also lost the third-place play-off match against Argentina, with Naudé starting the match as the South American side beat South Africa for the second time in the tournament, convincingly winning 49–19 to condemn South Africa to fourth place in the competition.

Naudé returned to domestic action to make a further two appearances for the Blue Bulls in the 2016 Currie Cup qualification series; he played off the bench in their 26–35 defeat to the Boland Cavaliers before starting their match against Border Bulldogs in East London. Naudé scored his first try in first class rugby in that match, helping his team to a 45–26 victory and seventh place on the log.

He then made six starts for the Blue Bulls U21 team in the 2016 Under-21 Provincial Championship. He scored four tries during the season – one against Golden Lions U21 and a hat-trick against Leopards U21 in a 52–38 victory in their final match of the regular season. The team finished in third spot, but Naudé didn't feature in their semi-final defeat to Golden Lions U21. He finished as his team's joint top-scorer, alongside namesake Dewald Naudé.

In November 2016, he was named in the Bulls Super Rugby team's extended training squad during the team's preparations for the 2017 Super Rugby season.
