= JT Jackson =

South African rugby union player

- Full name: John Thomas Jackson
- Born: 10 July 1996 (age 30) Calvinia, South Africa
- Height: 1.91 m (6 ft 3 in)
- Weight: 100 kg (15 st 10 lb; 220 lb)
- School: Hoër Landbouskool Oakdale, Riversdal

Rugby union career
- Position: Centre / Fly-half
- Current team: Southern Kings
Youth career
- 2009–2014: SWD Eagles
- 2015–2017: Blue Bulls
Amateur team(s)
Years	Team	Apps	(Points)
2015	UP Tuks	7	(15)
Senior career
Years	Team	Apps	(Points)
2016–2019	Blue Bulls XV	18	(62)
2017–2018	Blue Bulls	16	(17)
2018–2019	Bulls	3	(0)
2019-2020	Southern Kings	9	(15)
2021-	Rouen	38	(33)
- Correct as of 11 July 2019
International career
Years	Team	Apps	(Points)
2014	South Africa Schools	3	(10)
2015–2016	South Africa Under-20	7	(5)
- Correct as of 13 April 2018

John Thomas Jackson (born 10 July 1996) is a South African rugby union player for Rouen Normandie Rugby in the Pro D2. His usually plays as either an inside or outside centre, but he has also occasionally played fly-half in the past.

== Rugby union career ==
=== 2009–2014 : Schoolboy rugby union / SWD ===
Jackson was born in Calvinia, but grew up in Riversdal in the Western Cape, representing the SWD Eagles at various youth levels. He earned a provincial selection as early as primary school level, when he played as a fly-half at the Under-13 Craven Week held in Kimberley in 2009. He was the top scorer for SWD at the Under-16 Grant Khomo Week in 2012, scoring a try, seven conversions and three penalties for a total of 28 points in his three starts, at the Under-18 Academy Week in 2013, when he scored 20 points through four conversions and four penalties, and at the Under-18 Craven Week in 2014, scoring two tries, six conversions and two penalties for another 28-points haul.

At the conclusion of the 2014 Craven Week, he was also named in a South Africa Schools team hosted three matches in an Under-18 International Series. Jackson started all three matches; after featuring in a 28–13 victory over France, he scored one try in each of their matches against Wales and England.

=== 2015 : Blue Bulls, Tuks and South Africa Under-20 ===
After school, Jackson relocated to Pretoria, where he was amongst the Blue Bulls Academy intake prior to the 2015 season. He joined the UP Tuks rugby team – the Pretoria-based university side affiliated to the Blue Bulls Academy – for their 2015 Varsity Cup campaign. After playing off the bench in two matches, Jackson established himself in the starting line-up for the remaining five matches of the season. He scored tries in their matches against CUT Ixias, UJ and in their semi-final defeat to NWU Pukke.

Jackson was named in a 37-man training squad for the South Africa national under-20 rugby union team and started for them in a friendly match against a Varsity Cup Dream Team in April 2015. He was then included in the squad that embarked on a two-match tour of Argentina. He started both of their matches against Argentina helping them to a 25–22 victory in the first match and a 39–28 victory in the second match four days later. Upon the team's return to South Africa, he was named in the final squad for the 2015 World Rugby Under 20 Championship. He started their 33–5 win against hosts Italy and their 40–8 win against Samoa in their first two pool matches. However, he dropped out of the squad for their 46–13 win over Australia in the final pool match and also didn't feature in their 20–28 loss to England in the semi-final or their third-place play-off match against France, where South Africa achieved a 31–18 win to secure third place in the competition.

Jackson returned to domestic action in South Africa, appearing in all fourteen of the Blue Bulls U19' matches in the Group A of the 2015 Under-19 Provincial Championship. While Tinus de Beer was the main goal-kicker for the team, Jackson also contributed 50 points with the boot during the competition, in addition to scoring tries against Golden Lions U19, Free State U19 (first in an away match and then in the return leg at home), Western Province U19 and the Sharks U19 during the regular season, as well as in their semi-final match against Western Province in a 30–29 victory. Jackson also played in the final, but could not help his side to winning the championship, with Eastern Province U19 winning 25–23 in Johannesburg.

=== 2016 : Blue Bulls and South Africa Under-20 ===
In March 2016, Jackson was again included in a South Africa Under-20 training squad, also making the cut for a reduced provisional squad named a week later.

In between training with the team, he returned to the Blue Bulls to make two appearances for them in the 2016 Currie Cup qualification series; he made his domestic first class debut by starting in a 20–17 victory over a Free State XV and also started their 17–38 defeat to Gauteng rivals the Golden Lions XV a week later.

On 10 May 2016, he was included in the final South Africa Under-20 squad for the 2016 World Rugby Under 20 Championship tournament to be held in Manchester, England. He started their opening match in Pool C of the tournament as South Africa came from behind to beat Japan 59–19, and played off the bench in their next pool match as South Africa were beaten 13–19 by Argentina. He was restored to the starting line-up for their final pool match, as South Africa bounced back from their defeat to secure a 40-31 bonus-point victory over France to secure a semi-final place as the best runner-up in the competition. He started the semi-final, as South Africa faced three-time champions England. The hosts proving too strong for South Africa, knocking them out of the competition with a 39–17 victory. Jackson also started against Argentina in the third-place play-off match, but suffered their second defeat to Argentina in the tournament, convincingly being beaten 49–19 to finish in fourth place in the competition.

Jackson made one further start for the Blue Bulls in the Currie Cup qualification series after returning to domestic action, starting in a 95–12 win over Namibian invitational side the Welwitschias.

Jackson was then named in their squad for the 2016 Currie Cup Premier Division.
