= Alwayno Visagie =

South African rugby union player

- Born: 2 January 1996 (age 30) Ceres, South Africa
- Height: 1.82 m (5 ft 11 1/2 in)
- Weight: 97 kg (214 lb)
- School: Paarl Gimnasium
- University: University of KwaZulu-Natal

Rugby union career
- Position: Centre
- Current team: Sharks (Currie Cup)
Senior career
Years	Team	Apps	(Points)
2018	Sharks XV	2	(0)
2018–2022	Pumas	27	(45)
2023–	Sharks (Currie Cup)		
- Correct as of 10 July 2022

Alwayno Visagie (born 2 January 1996) is a South African rugby union player for the Pumas in the Currie Cup and the Rugby Challenge. His regular position is centre.
