= Sbu Nkosi =

South African rugby union player

- Full name: S'busiso Romeo Nkosi
- Born: 21 January 1996 (age 30) Barberton, South Africa
- Height: 1.81 m (5 ft 11 1/2 in)
- Weight: 97 kg (15 st 4 lb; 214 lb)
- School: Barberton High School; Jeppe High School for Boys
- University: University of KwaZulu-Natal

Rugby union career
- Position: Winger
- Current team: Cheetahs / Free State Cheetahs
Youth career
- 2012: Pumas
- 2013–2014: Golden Lions
- 2015–2017: Sharks
Amateur team(s)
| Years | Team | Apps | (Points) |
| 2016 | UKZN Impi | 6 | (15) |
Senior career
| Years | Team | Apps | (Points) |
| 2016–2017 | Sharks XV | 6 | (0) |
| 2017–2022 | Sharks | 49 | (50) |
| 2017–2022 | Sharks (Currie Cup) | 21 | (70) |
| 2022–2023 | Bulls | 5 | (10) |
| 2024– | Cheetahs / Free State Cheetahs | 1 | (5) |
- Correct as of 23 July 2022
International career
| Years | Team | Apps | (Points) |
| 2016 | South Africa Under-20 | 3 | (0) |
| 2018–2022 | South Africa | 16 | (45) |
- Correct as of 8 October 2021
Medal record
Men's Rugby union
Representing South Africa
Rugby World Cup
| Gold medal – first place | 2019 Japan | National Team competition |

S'busiso Romeo Nkosi (born 21 January 1996) is a South African professional rugby union player for the South Africa national team and the Free State Cheetahs in Currie Cup. His regular position is winger.

== Rugby career ==
=== 2012–2014 : Youth rugby – Pumas and Golden Lions ===
Nkosi grew up in Barberton. In 2012, his local Pumas team called him up to represent them at the Under-16 Grant Khomo Week tournament, where Nkosi made three appearances. He attended Barberton High School till Grade 10 there after moving to Johannesburg to attend Jeppe High School for Boys, where he earned selections in the Golden Lions' Under-18 Craven Week team in both 2013 and 2014. He scored a try in the unofficial final of the 2013 tournament in Polokwane, but his side fell short, losing 29–45 to Western Province.

=== 2015–2016 : Sharks, UKZN Impi and South Africa Under-20 ===
After high school, Nkosi fell in love with Durban and decided Durban to join the Sharks. He made eleven starts for the Sharks U19 team in the 2015 Under-19 Provincial Championship, scoring seven tries – he scored two tries against the Leopards U19 in Durban and a further two tries on his return to Johannesburg to face the Golden Lions U19s, a try in both their home and away matches against Blue Bulls U19, and one try against Western Province U19. His try-scoring exploits saw him finish as his side's top try scorer, and joint-sixth overall in Group A of the competition, in a disappointing season for the Sharks that saw them finish bottom of the log.

Nkosi made twenty appearances for the UKZN Impi in the 2016 Varsity Shield competition, scoring twenty four try against UWC and two in their 63–30 victory over the TUT Vikings as his side won seven of their eight matches in the competition. They would have finished joint-top of the log with Wits, but had 12 points deducted for fielding an ineligible player, being promoted to third place on the log and missing out on the title play-offs and a shot at promotion to the Varsity Cup.

In March 2016, Nkosi was included in a South Africa Under-20 training squad, and made the cut to be named in a reduced provisional squad a week later. He was released from the South Africa Under-20s training camp to play two matches for the Sharks XV in the 2016 Currie Cup qualification series – playing off the bench in a 48–18 victory over Namibian side the Welwitschias in his first class debut and starting their 24–16 victory over Western Province a fortnight later – before being included in the final South Africa Under-20 squad for the 2016 World Rugby Under 20 Championship tournament to be held in Manchester, England. He started in their opening match in Pool C of the tournament as South Africa came from behind to beat Japan 59–19. He also started their other two pool matches as South Africa were beaten 13–19 by Argentina in their second match, but bounced back to secure a 40-31 bonus-point victory over France in their final pool match to secure a semi-final place as the best runner-up in the competition. Nkosi suffered a thigh injury which ruled him out of the remainder of the competition, so he didn't feature in the semi-final – where they faced three-time champions England, with the hosts proved too strong, knocking South Africa out of the competition with a 39–17 victory – or their final match, the third-place play-off against Argentina. Argentina beat South Africa for the second time in the tournament, convincingly winning 49–19 to condemn South Africa to fourth place in the competition.

Nkosi was included in the Sharks' squad for the 2016 Currie Cup Premier Division, but did not get any game time, instead making three appearances for the Sharks U21 team in the 2016 Under-21 Provincial Championship. At the end of October 2016, he was included in the Sharks Super Rugby squad for the 2017 season.

Nkosi was named in South Africa's squad for the 2019 Rugby World Cup. South Africa went on to win the tournament, defeating England in the final.

In 2024, Nkosi was banned from professional play for use of a banned substance and will only be eligible to play again after serving his ban for a total of three years.

== Statistics ==
=== Test match record ===
| Opponent | P | W | D | L | Try | Pts | %Won |
|---|---|---|---|---|---|---|---|
| Argentina | 2 | 2 | 0 | 0 | 2 | 10 | 100 |
| Australia | 3 | 1 | 0 | 2 | 1 | 5 | 33.33 |
| Canada | 1 | 1 | 0 | 0 | 1 | 5 | 100 |
| England | 4 | 2 | 0 | 2 | 3 | 15 | 50 |
| France | 1 | 1 | 0 | 0 | 1 | 5 | 100 |
| Namibia | 1 | 1 | 0 | 0 | 0 | 0 | 100 |
| New Zealand | 2 | 1 | 0 | 1 | 1 | 5 | 50 |
| Scotland | 1 | 1 | 0 | 0 | 0 | 0 | 100 |
| Wales | 1 | 1 | 0 | 0 | 0 | 0 | 100 |
| Total | 16 | 11 | 0 | 5 | 9 | 45 | 68.75 |

=== International tries ===
| Try | Opposing team | Location | Venue | Competition | Date | Result | Score |
|---|---|---|---|---|---|---|---|
| 1 | England | Johannesburg, South Africa | Ellis Park Stadium | 2018 England tour of South Africa | 9 June 2018 | Win | 42–39 |
| 2 | England | Johannesburg, South Africa | Ellis Park Stadium | 2018 England tour of South Africa | 9 June 2018 | Win | 42–39 |
| 3 | England | London, England | Twickenham Stadium | 2018 end-of-year tests | 3 November 2018 | Loss | 12–11 |
| 4 | France | Saint-Denis, France | Stade de France | 2018 end-of-year tests | 10 November 2018 | Win | 26–29 |
| 5 | Australia | Johannesburg, South Africa | Ellis Park Stadium | 2019 Rugby Championship | 20 July 2019 | Win | 35–17 |
| 6 | Argentina | Pretoria, South Africa | Loftus Versfeld Stadium | 2019 Rugby World Cup warm-up matches | 17 August 2019 | Win | 24–18 |
| 7 | Argentina | Pretoria, South Africa | Loftus Versfeld Stadium | 2019 Rugby World Cup warm-up matches | 17 August 2019 | Win | 24–18 |
| 8 | Canada | Kobe, Japan | Kobe Misaki Stadium | 2019 Rugby World Cup pool stage | 8 October 2019 | Win | 66–7 |
| 9 | New Zealand | Townsville, Australia | North Queensland Stadium | 2021 Rugby Championship | 25 September 2021 | Loss | 19–17 |

== Honours ==
- Currie Cup 2018 - winner
- Rugby Championship 2019 - winner
- Rugby World Cup Japan 2019 - winner
- South Africa A vs British and Irish Lions 2021 (exhibition match) - winner
