= Morné Joubert =

South African rugby union player

- Born: 19 January 1996 (age 30) Pretoria, South Africa
- Height: 1.80 m (5 ft 11 in)
- Weight: 85 kg (187 lb; 13 st 5 lb)
- School: Glenwood High School
- University: University of KwaZulu-Natal

Rugby union career
- Position: Utility back
- Current team: Pumas
Youth career
- 2012–2017: Sharks
Senior career
Years	Team	Apps	(Points)
2016–2018	Sharks XV	11	(20)
2018–2021	Pumas	22	(45)
2021	Griffons	7	(17)
2022–	Pumas	0	(0)
- Correct as of 10 July 2022

Morné Joubert (born 19 January 1996) is a South African rugby union player for the Griffons (rugby union) in the Currie Cup and the Rugby Challenge. He is a utility back that can play as a wing, centre or fullback.
