= Barberton High School, Mpumalanga =

Barberton High School
- Hoërskool Barberton

Location
- Sheba Road; Barberton, Mpumalanga; South Africa
- Coordinates: 25°46′26″S 31°03′01″E

Information
- Motto: Volhard (Persevere)
- Established: 1956
- Principal: Mr. Pieter Ferreira
- Website: facebook.com/hsbarberton/

Barberton High School (Afrikaans: Hoërskool Barberton) is a government and private school located in Barberton, Mpumalanga, South Africa.

== History ==
The school opened its doors in 1956.

In 2016 Pieter Ferreira became the principal of the school. In 2018, Barberton High School burned to the ground. The school has been rebuilt. In 2021, the school briefly closed due to the COVID-19 pandemic.

== Former students ==
- S'busiso Nkosi (1996), professional rugby union player (left after grade 10)
