= Hendré Stassen =

South African rugby union player (born 1997)

- Born: 29 December 1997 (age 28) Boksburg, South Africa
- Height: 2.00 m (6 ft 6 1/2 in)
- Weight: 119 kg (262 lb; 18 st 10 lb)
- School: Hoërskool Dr. E.G. Jansen, Boksburg
- University: University of Pretoria

Rugby union career
- Position: Lock
- Current team: Stade Français
Youth career
- 2016–2018: Blue Bulls
Senior career
| Years | Team | Apps | (Points) |
| 2018 | Bulls | 3 | (0) |
| 2018 | Blue Bulls XV | 2 | (0) |
| 2018 | Blue Bulls | 7 | (0) |
| 2018–present | Stade Français | 18 | (15) |
- Correct as of 11 July 2019
International career
| Years | Team | Apps | (Points) |
| 2017 | South Africa Under-20 | 3 | (0) |
- Correct as of 11 April 2018

Hendré Stassen (born 29 December 1997) is a South African rugby union player for The Stormers and Western Province in the URC and Currie Cup. His regular position is flank or lock.
