= Madot Mabokela =

South African rugby union player

- Full name: Kgetho Malesela Emmanuel Mabokela
- Born: 15 July 1996 (age 30) Polokwane, South Africa
- Height: 1.82 m (5 ft 11 1/2 in)
- Weight: 114 kg (251 lb)
- School: Hoërskool Ben Vorster, Tzaneen

Rugby union career
- Position: Prop
- Current team: Griquas
Senior career
Years	Team	Apps	(Points)
2018–2019	Blue Bulls XV	11	(5)
2019	Blue Bulls	1	(0)
2020–2021	Griquas	3	(0)
- Correct as of 27 December 2021

Kgetho Malesela Emmanuel 'Madot' Mabokela (born 15 July 1996) is a South African rugby union player for the Bulls in Super Rugby, the Blue Bulls in the Currie Cup and the Blue Bulls XV in the Rugby Challenge. His regular position is prop.

He made his Currie Cup debut for the Blue Bulls in August 2019, coming on as a replacement in their match against the Golden Lions in Round Five of the 2019 season.
