= Jeremy Ward (rugby union) =

South African rugby union player

- Full name: Jeremy Charles Ward
- Born: 10 January 1996 (age 30) Port Elizabeth, South Africa
- Height: 1.87 m (6 ft 1 1/2 in)
- Weight: 92 kg (203 lb; 14 st 7 lb)
- School: Grey High School, Port Elizabeth

Rugby union career
- Position: Centre
- Current team: Stade Français
Youth career
- 2012–2016: Eastern Province Kings
Amateur team(s)
Years	Team	Apps	(Points)
2016	NMMU Madibaz	6	(0)
Senior career
Years	Team	Apps	(Points)
2016	Eastern Province Kings	4	(5)
2016	Southern Kings	2	(0)
2017–2022	Sharks	45	(30)
2017–2022	Sharks (Currie Cup)	46	(65)
2018–2019	Sharks XV	16	(35)
2022–	Stade Français	68	(105)
- Correct as of 14 May 2025
International career
Years	Team	Apps	(Points)
2016	South Africa Under-20	4	(10)
- Correct as of 21 June 2016

Jeremy Charles Ward (born 10 January 1996), is a South African professional rugby union player for Stade Français in the French Top 14. His regular playing position is centre.

== Rugby career ==
=== 2012–2014: Schoolboy rugby ===
Ward was born and raised in Port Elizabeth where he attended the city's Grey High School, where he played rugby union and water polo. In 2012, he was included in the Eastern Province Under-16 squad that participated at the Grant Khomo Week tournament, where he played in all three of their matches, scoring two points via a conversion in their match against SWD.

Ward represented Eastern Province at the premier South African high schools competition, the Under-18 Craven Week, on two occasions – at the 2013 tournament in Polokwane and the 2014 tournament in Middelburg, helping Eastern Province to win the unofficial final of the 2014 tournament for the first time since 1977, beating SWD 25–7. Shortly after the 2014 Craven Week, Ward was also included in the Eastern Province U19 squad that participated in the 2014 Under-19 Provincial Championship, their first season in Group A of the competition following winning promotion in 2013. He started at outside centre in six of their twelve matches in the competition, scoring tries in their 17–13 win over Free State U19 and their 7–15 defeat to Sharks U19, eventually helping the team to finish in sixth position on the log, avoiding the relegation play-off.

=== 2015: Eastern Province Under-19 ===
Ward remained in the Eastern Province Under-19 side for the 2015 Under-19 Provincial Championship, also being named captain of the side. Ward featured in eleven of their twelve matches during the regular season. He scored tries in their 41–24 victory over Leopards U19, their 13–10 victory over Western Province U19 their 34–22 victory over Golden Lions and their 33–14 win over Leopards U19 as his side drastically improved on their 2014 form, winning eleven of their matches – including their first ten matches of the season – to top the log and to qualify for a home semi-final against Free State U19. Ward started in a 31–15 win to see his side qualify for the final before making a crucial contribution in the final, scoring two tries in their 25–23 victory over Blue Bulls U19 to win the Under-19 Provincial Championship for the first time in their history.

=== 2016: Eastern Province Kings and South Africa Under-20 ===
Serious financial problems at the Eastern Province Kings at the end of the 2015 season saw a number of first team regulars leave the union and Ward was among a number of youngsters that were promoted to the squad that competed in the 2016 Currie Cup qualification series, also being named captain of the team. He was named in the starting lineup for their first match of the season against the SWD Eagles, scoring the Kings' second try in a 14–37 defeat.

In March 2016, Ward was included in a South Africa Under-20 training squad, and made the cut to be named in a reduced provisional squad a week later. On 10 May 2016, he was included in the final squad for the 2016 World Rugby Under 20 Championship tournament to be held in Manchester, England, also being named captain of the team. He started in their opening match in Pool C of the tournament, scoring two tries as South Africa came from behind to beat Japan 59–19. He also started their other two pool matches as South Africa were beaten 13–19 by Argentina in their second match, but bounced back to secure a 40-31 bonus-point victory over France in their final pool match to secure a semi-final place as the best runner-up in the competition. Ward captained the side as they faced three-time champions England in the semi-finals, but the hosts proved too strong for South Africa, knocking them out of the competition with a 39–17 victory. Ward was sin-binned in the 16th minute of the match, with the World Rugby Disciplinary Committee subsequently handing him a two-week ban. This ruled Ward out of the final match against Argentina, in the third-place play-off final. Argentina beat South Africa – as they did in the pool stages – convincingly winning 49–19 and in the process condemning South Africa to fourth place in the competition.

Upon his return to South Africa, Ward was drafted into the Southern Kings Super Rugby squad and named on the bench for their Round Sixteen match against the Lions.

=== 2017: Sharks ===
On 27 July 2016, the Sharks based in Durban announced that they signed Ward for the 2017 Super Rugby season where he still currently plays.
