= 2019 Currie Cup Premier Division =

Domestic rugby union competition

- Countries: South Africa
- Date: 12 July – 7 September 2019
- Champions: Free State Cheetahs (6th title)
- Runners-up: Golden Lions
- Matches played: 24
- Tries scored: 186 (average 7.8 per match)
- Top point scorer: Shaun Reynolds (Golden Lions, 93)
- Top try scorer: Joseph Dweba (Free State Cheetahs) and Madosh Tambwe (Golden Lions, 7)

The 2019 Currie Cup Premier Division was the 81st edition of the top tier of the Currie Cup, the premier domestic rugby union competition in South Africa. DirectAxis Financial Services was the tournament sponsor. It was organised by the South African Rugby Union and ran from 12 July to 7 September 2019.

The competition was won by the Free State Cheetahs, who beat the Golden Lions 31–28 in the final played on 7 September 2019.

== Competition rules and information ==
There were seven participating teams in the 2019 Currie Cup Premier Division. They played each other once during the pool stage, either at home or away. Teams received four points for a win and two points for a draw. Bonus points were awarded to teams that scored four or more tries in a game, as well as to teams that lost a match by seven points or less. Teams were ranked by log points, then points difference (points scored less points conceded).

The top four teams in the pool stage qualified for the semi finals, which will be followed by a final.

== Teams ==
The teams that competed in the 2019 Currie Cup Premier Division are:

Location of teams in the 2019 Currie Cup Premier Division

2019 Currie Cup Premier Division teams
Team	Sponsored Name
Blue Bulls	Vodacom Blue Bulls
Free State Cheetahs	Toyota Free State Cheetahs
Golden Lions	Xerox Golden Lions
Griquas	Tafel Lager Griquas
Pumas	Pumas
Sharks	Cell C Sharks
Western Province	DHL Western Province

== Regular season ==
=== Standings ===
The current standings in the 2019 Currie Cup Premier Division is:

2019 Currie Cup Premier Division standings
Pos	Team	Pld	W	D	L	PF	PA	PD	TF	TA	TB	LB	Pts
1	Free State Cheetahs	6	4	0	2	234	162	+72	34	21	4	2	22
2	Golden Lions	6	4	0	2	173	174	−1	24	21	4	2	22
3	Griquas	6	4	0	2	178	175	+3	22	24	4	1	21
4	Sharks	6	4	0	2	170	179	−9	20	22	2	1	19
5	Western Province	6	2	0	4	176	146	+30	23	19	2	4	14
6	Blue Bulls	6	2	0	4	143	191	−48	20	25	2	0	10
7	Pumas	6	1	0	5	161	208	−47	19	30	3	2	9

=== Round-by-round ===
The table below shows each team's progression throughout the season. For each round, each team's cumulative points total is shown with the overall log position in brackets.

Team Progression
Team	R1	R2	R3	R4	R5	R6	R7	SF	F
Free State Cheetahs	0 (5th)	5 (2nd)	10 (1st)	11 (3rd)	12 (3rd)	17 (2nd)	22 (1st)	Won	Won
Golden Lions	5 (2nd)	5 (4th)	9 (3rd)	13 (2nd)	15 (1st)	17 (3rd)	22 (2nd)	Won	Lost
Griquas	5 (1st)	10 (1st)	10 (2nd)	15 (1st)	15 (2nd)	19 (1st)	21 (3rd)	Lost	—N/a
Sharks	0 (7th)	5 (5th)	5 (5th)	6 (6th)	10 (5th)	14 (4th)	19 (4th)	Lost	—N/a
Western Province	4 (3rd)	5 (3rd)	7 (4th)	7 (4th)	12 (4th)	13 (5th)	14 (5th)	—N/a	—N/a
Blue Bulls	0 (6th)	1 (7th)	5 (6th)	5 (7th)	9 (6th)	9 (6th)	10 (6th)	—N/a	—N/a
Pumas	2 (4th)	3 (6th)	3 (7th)	7 (5th)	7 (7th)	7 (7th)	9 (7th)	—N/a	—N/a
Key:	win	draw	loss	bye					

=== Matches ===
The following matches were played in the 2019 Currie Cup Premier Division:

==== Round One ====
12 July 2019	Sharks	13–37	Griquas	Jonsson Kings Park, Durban
19:15	Try: Cameron Wright 63'; Con: Curwin Bosch 64'; Pen: Curwin Bosch 24', 29'	Scoreboard; Report	Try: Zak Burger 1'; Michal Haznar 42'; Wilmar Arnoldi 69', 74'; Con: George Whitehead 3', 43', 71', 75'; Pen: George Whitehead 37', 51', 61'	Referee: Marius van der Westhuizen

13 July 2019	Golden Lions	38–37	Pumas	Emirates Airline Park, Johannesburg
15:00	Try: Madosh Tambwe 8', 30', 64', 68'; Tyrone Green 40'; Shaun Reynolds 77'; Con: Shaun Reynolds 9', 31', 41', 78'	Scoreboard; Report	Try: Carel du Preez 3'; Le Roux Roets 19'; Etienne Taljaard 49'; Morgan Naudé 59'; Con: Kobus Marais 4', 21', 50', 60'; Pen: Kobus Marais 39', 43', 54'	Referee: Rasta Rasivhenge

13 July 2019	Western Province	20–5	Blue Bulls	DHL Newlands, Cape Town
17:15	Try: Ruhan Nel 25'; Juarno Augustus 46'; Craig Barry 82'; Con: SP Marais 47'; Pen: SP Marais 65'	Scoreboard; Report	Try: Embrose Papier 6'	Referee: AJ Jacobs

Bye/s: Free State Cheetahs

==== Round Two ====
19 July 2019	Griquas	37–29	Pumas	Tafel Lager Park, Kimberley
17:00	Try: Anthony Volmink 3', 77'; Eduan Keyter 43'; Ewald van der Westhuizen 49'; André Swarts 62'; Con: George Whitehead 5', 44', 63'; Pen: George Whitehead 18'; Tinus de Beer 74'	Scoreboard; Report	Try: Morné Joubert 23'; Andrew Beerwinkel 45'; Ryan Nell 64'; Morgan Naudé 69'; Con: Kobus Marais 46', 65'; Chris Smith 70'; Pen: Kobus Marais 59'	Referee: AJ Jacobs

19 July 2019	Blue Bulls	27–43	Free State Cheetahs	Loftus Versfeld, Pretoria
19:15	Try: Cornal Hendricks 11'; Ruan Steenkamp 37'; Rosko Specman 54'; Johan Grobbelaar 77'; Conraad van Vuuren 80'; Con: Manie Libbok 38'	Scoreboard; Report	Try: Henco Venter 8'; Benhard Janse van Rensburg 25', 32'; Louis Fouché 51'; Jasper Wiese 60'; Darren Adonis 73'; Con: Tian Schoeman 9', 33', 52', 60', 74'; Pen: Tian Schoeman 4'	Referee: Marius van der Westhuizen

20 July 2019	Sharks	32–27	Western Province	Jonsson Kings Park, Durban
14:00	Try: Lwazi Mvovo 17'; Kobus van Wyk 36'; JP Pietersen 41'; Craig Burden 71'; Con: Curwin Bosch 37', 42', 73'; Pen: Curwin Bosch 2', 54'	Scoreboard; Report	Try: Jaco Coetzee 24'; Ruhan Nel 59'; Joshua Stander 77'; Con: SP Marais 26', 60', 77'; Pen: SP Marais 4', 70'	Referee: Stuart Berry

Bye/s: Golden Lions

==== Round Three ====
26 July 2019	Pumas	17–25	Blue Bulls	Mbombela Stadium, Mbombela
19:15	Try: Etienne Taljaard 2'; Willie Engelbrecht 51'; Con: Chris Smith 3'; Kobus Marais 52'; Pen: Chris Smith 39'	Scoreboard; Report	Try: Rosko Specman 6', 23', 70'; Con: Marnitz Boshoff 6'; Manie Libbok 71'; Pen: Marnitz Boshoff 42'; Manie Libbok 68'	Referee: Egon Seconds

27 July 2019	Free State Cheetahs	68–14	Griquas	Toyota Stadium, Bloemfontein
15:00	Try: Junior Pokomela 4'; Henco Venter 20'; Joseph Dweba 36', 44'; William Small-Smith 38', 65'; Dries Swanepoel 50', 75'; Rabz Maxwane 59'; Louis Fouché 80'; Con: Tian Schoeman 6', 21', 37', 40', 51', 61'; Louis Fouché 66', 76', 81'	Scoreboard; Report	Try: Eduan Keyter 48'; Ederies Arendse 54'; Con: George Whitehead 48', 55'	Referee: Jaco Peyper

27 July 2019	Western Province	28–30	Golden Lions	DHL Newlands, Cape Town
17:15	Try: Scarra Ntubeni 9', 31'; Paul de Wet 18'; Dillyn Leyds 56'; Con: Joshua Stander 10', 19', 32', 57'	Scoreboard; Report	Try: Ruben Schoeman 26'; Pieter Jansen 50'; Tyrone Green 72'; Con: Shaun Reynolds 28', 51', 73'; Pen: Shaun Reynolds 38', 45', 68'	Referee: Stuart Berry

Bye/s: Sharks

==== Round Four ====
2 August 2019	Free State Cheetahs	22–24	Golden Lions	Toyota Stadium, Bloemfontein
19:15	Try: Joseph Dweba 11'; Walt Steenkamp 18'; Marnus van der Merwe 31'; Con: Tian Schoeman 13'; Benhard Janse van Rensburg 32'; Pen: Louis Fouché 72'	Scoreboard; Report	Try: Madosh Tambwe 42'; Tyrone Green 45'; Wandisile Simelane 50'; Con: Shaun Reynolds 43', 46', 52'; Pen: Shaun Reynolds 79'	Referee: Jaco Peyper

3 August 2019	Pumas	27–20	Sharks	Mbombela Stadium, Mbombela
15:00	Try: Francois Kleinhans 40'; Simon Westraadt 56'; Con: Chris Smith 41'; Pen: Chris Smith 3', 25', 38', 47', 76'	Scoreboard; Report	Try: Lwazi Mvovo 11'; Kobus van Wyk 17'; Curwin Bosch 29'; Con: Curwin Bosch 17'; Pen: Curwin Bosch 53'	Referee: Cwengile Jadezweni

3 August 2019	Blue Bulls	15–37	Griquas	Loftus Versfeld, Pretoria
17:15	Try: Rosko Specman 4'; Marco van Staden 54'; Con: Manie Libbok 5'; Pen: Manie Libbok 14'	Scoreboard; Report	Try: Zak Burger 18', 28'; Eduan Keyter 50'; Victor Sekekete 76'; Con: George Whitehead 19', 30', 52', 77'; Pen: George Whitehead 33', 39', 67'	Referee: Divan Uys

Bye/s: Western Province

==== Round Five ====
9 August 2019	Western Province	45–14	Pumas	DHL Newlands, Cape Town
15:00	Try: Sergeal Petersen 14'; Sikhumbuzo Notshe 18'; Seabelo Senatla 22', 35'; Justin Phillips 31'; Ernst van Rhyn 52'; Ruhan Nel 79'; Con: Joshua Stander 23', 31', 36'; Jean-Luc du Plessis 53', 80'	Scoreboard; Report	Try: Alwayno Visagie 5'; Chris Smith 76'; Con: Chris Smith 6', 77'	Referee: AJ Jacobs

10 August 2019	Sharks	27–20	Free State Cheetahs	Jonsson Kings Park, Durban
15:00	Try: Lwazi Mvovo 11'; Aphelele Fassi 40'; Kobus van Wyk 78'; Con: Curwin Bosch 13', 41'; Rhyno Smith 79'; Pen: Curwin Bosch 4'	Scoreboard; Report	Try: Joseph Dweba 15'; Benhard Janse van Rensburg 32'; Carel-Jan Coetzee 69'; Con: Louis Fouché 33'; Pen: Louis Fouché 50'	Referee: Rasta Rasivhenge

10 August 2019	Golden Lions	26–31	Blue Bulls	Emirates Airline Park, Johannesburg
17:15	Try: Shaun Reynolds 25'; Pieter Jansen 51'; Stean Pienaar 68'; Con: Shaun Reynolds 53', 69'	Scoreboard; Report	Try: Cornal Hendricks 0'; Dayan van der Westhuizen 9'; Manie Libbok 45'; Con: Manie Libbok 10', 46'; Pen: Manie Libbok 30', 34', 56', 75'	Referee: Cwengile Jadezweni

Bye/s: Griquas

==== Round Six ====
16 August 2019	Griquas	27–23	Western Province	Tafel Lager Park, Kimberley
19:15	Try: Ederies Arendse 1', 57'; Eduan Keyter 33'; Con: George Whitehead 3', 34', 58'; Pen: George Whitehead 47', 68'	Scoreboard; Report	Try: Seabelo Senatla 51', 79'; Nama Xaba 75'; Con: SP Marais 75'; Pen: SP Marais 24', 41'	Referee: Rasta Rasivhenge

17 August 2019	Pumas	37–43	Free State Cheetahs	Mbombela Stadium, Mbombela
14:00	Try: Alwayno Visagie 9', 22', 71'; Devon Williams 25'; Jeandré Rudolph 58'; Con: Chris Smith 10', 26', 72'; Pen: Chris Smith 16', 46'	Scoreboard; Report	Try: Benhard Janse van Rensburg 4', 50'; Clayton Blommetjies 29'; Ruan Pienaar 43'; Jasper Wiese 47'; Louis Fouché 66'; Con: Louis Fouché 5', 29', 44', 48', 51'; Pen: Louis Fouché 56'	Referee: Cwengile Jadezweni

18 August 2019	Golden Lions	28–30	Sharks	Emirates Airline Park, Johannesburg
14:00	Try: Shaun Reynolds 3', 62'; Tyrone Green 45'; Marnus Schoeman 74'; Con: Shaun Reynolds 4'; Pen: Shaun Reynolds 27', 55'	Scoreboard; Report	Try: Jeremy Ward 15', 69'; Sanele Nohamba 21'; Con: Sanele Nohamba 17', 22'; Rhyno Smith 70'; Pen: Sanele Nohamba 7', 50'; Drop: Boeta Chamberlain 35'	Referee: Marius van der Westhuizen

Bye/s: Blue Bulls

==== Round Seven ====
24 August 2019	Griquas	26–27	Golden Lions	Tafel Lager Park, Kimberley
15:00	Try: Gideon van der Merwe 39', 69'; AJ le Roux 50'; Wilmar Arnoldi 61'; Con: George Whitehead 40', 63'; Chriswill September 51'	Scoreboard; Report	Try: Stean Pienaar 6', 66'; Tyrone Green 23'; Madosh Tambwe 36'; Con: Shaun Reynolds 7', 37'; Pen: Shaun Reynolds 74'	Referee: AJ Jacobs

24 August 2019	Free State Cheetahs	38–33	Western Province	Toyota Stadium, Bloemfontein
17:15	Try: William Small-Smith 26'; Joseph Dweba 39'; Tian Meyer 48'; Darren Adonis 52'; Ox Nché 61'; Jasper Wiese 71'; Con: Tian Schoeman 40', 49', 53', 62'	Scoreboard; Report	Try: Wilco Louw 23'; Dillyn Leyds 37'; Scarra Ntubeni 44'; Con: SP Marais 24', 38', 46'; Pen: SP Marais 4', 11', 15', 22'	Referee: Marius van der Westhuizen

24 August 2019	Blue Bulls	40–48	Sharks	Loftus Versfeld, Pretoria
19:30	Try: Johnny Kôtze 9'; Lizo Gqoboka 18'; Manie Libbok 30'; Cornal Hendricks 50'; Ruan Steenkamp 67'; Tim Agaba 80'; Con: Manie Libbok 10', 19', 31', 51'; Vaughen Isaacs 81'	Scoreboard; Report	Try: Thomas du Toit 26'; Jacques Vermeulen 33'; André Esterhuizen 41'; Jeremy Ward 43'; Kobus van Wyk 46'; Rhyno Smith 73'; Con: Sanele Nohamba 27', 34', 42', 44', 47'; Rhyno Smith 75'; Pen: Sanele Nohamba 8', 14'	Referee: Rasta Rasivhenge

Bye/s: Pumas

== Play-offs ==
=== Title play-offs ===
==== Semi-finals ====
31 August 2019	Golden Lions	34–19	Griquas	Emirates Airline Park, Johannesburg
14:00	Try: Madosh Tambwe 6'; Stean Pienaar 15'; Hacjivah Dayimani 40'; Marnus Schoeman 75'; Con: Shaun Reynolds 7', 16', 41', 77'; Pen: Shaun Reynolds 60', 70'	Scoreboard	Try: Chris Smit 12'; Con: George Whitehead 14'; Pen: George Whitehead 21', 26', 57', 69'	Referee: Cwengile Jadezweni

31 August 2019	Free State Cheetahs	51–30	Sharks	Toyota Stadium, Bloemfontein
17:00	Try: Junior Pokomela 12', 69'; William Small-Smith 46'; Ruan Pienaar 57'; Joseph Dweba 61'; Ox Nché 73'; Jasper Wiese 76'; Con: Ruan Pienaar 59', 62', 70', 74', 77'; Pen: Tian Schoeman 5', 17'	Scoreboard	Try: Curwin Bosch 1', 66'; Sanele Nohamba 20'; Lwazi Mvovo 37'; Con: Curwin Bosch 2', 67'; Pen: Curwin Bosch 32', 43'	Referee: AJ Jacobs

==== Final ====
7 September 2019	Free State Cheetahs	31–28	Golden Lions	Toyota Stadium, Bloemfontein
17:00	Try: Joseph Dweba 10'; William Small-Smith 25'; Clayton Blommetjies 29'; Walt Steenkamp 36'; Con: Ruan Pienaar 12', 26', 30', 38'; Pen: Ruan Pienaar 17'	Scoreboard	Try: Wandisile Simelane 14'; Dillon Smit 70'; James Venter 74', 80'; Con: Shaun Reynolds 15', 71', 75', 80'	Attendance: 39 000; Referee: Marius van der Westhuizen

=== Relegation play-off ===
6 September 2019	Pumas	49–5	Griffons	Mbombela Stadium, Mbombela
17:00	Try: Marko Janse van Rensburg (2); Ashlon Davids; Luther Obi (2); Alwayno Visagie; Con: Chris Smith (3); Devon Williams; Kobus Marais; Pen: Chris Smith (3)	Scoreboard	Try: Danrich Visagie	Referee: Cwengile Jadezweni

- Pumas remained in the Currie Cup Premier Division for 2020.
- Griffons remained in the Currie Cup First Division for 2020.

== Honours ==
The honour roll for the 2019 Currie Cup Premier Division was:

2019 Currie Cup Premier Division
Champions:	Free State Cheetahs (6th title)
Top points scorer:	Shaun Reynolds, Golden Lions (93)
Top try scorers:	Joseph Dweba, Free State Cheetahs; Madosh Tambwe, Golden Lions (7)

== Players ==
The squads and player appearance and scoring statistics for the 2019 Currie Cup Premier Division are as follows:

Blue Bulls
Name	WPr	FSC	PMA	GRQ	LIO	SHA	SF	F	App	Try	Con	Pen	DG	Pts
Simphiwe Matanzima	1	1	1	1			—N/a	—N/a	4	0	0	0	0	0
Jaco Visagie	2	2	2	2	16 (substituted on)		—N/a	—N/a	5	0	0	0	0	0
Conraad van Vuuren	3	18 (substituted on)	18 (substituted on)	18 (substituted on)	18 (substituted on)	18 (substituted on)	—N/a	—N/a	6	1	0	0	0	5
Ruan Nortjé	4	5	5	5	5	5	—N/a	—N/a	6	0	0	0	0	0
Lood de Jager	5						—N/a	—N/a	1	0	0	0	0	0
Ruan Steenkamp	6	6	6	6		20 (substituted on)	—N/a	—N/a	5	2	0	0	0	10
Wian Vosloo	7		20 (substituted on)	20 (substituted on)	7	7	—N/a	—N/a	5	0	0	0	0	0
Tim Agaba	8	8	8	8	8	8	—N/a	—N/a	6	1	0	0	0	5
Embrose Papier	9	9	9	9	21 (substituted on)	21 (substituted on)	—N/a	—N/a	6	1	0	0	0	5
Manie Libbok	10	10	22 (substituted on)	10	10	10	—N/a	—N/a	6	2	9	6	0	46
Rosko Specman	11	11	11	11	11	11	—N/a	—N/a	6	5	0	0	0	25
Burger Odendaal	12						—N/a	—N/a	1	0	0	0	0	0
Johnny Kôtze	13	12	12	12	13	13	—N/a	—N/a	6	1	0	0	0	5
Cornal Hendricks	14	14	14	14	14	14	—N/a	—N/a	6	3	0	0	0	15
Divan Rossouw	15	15	15	15	15	15	—N/a	—N/a	6	0	0	0	0	0
Johan Grobbelaar	16 (substituted on)	16 (substituted on)	16 (substituted on)	16 (substituted on)	2	2	—N/a	—N/a	6	1	0	0	0	5
Matthys Basson	17 (substituted on)						—N/a	—N/a	1	0	0	0	0	0
Dayan van der Westhuizen	18 (substituted on)	17 (substituted on)	17	17 (substituted on)	1	17 (substituted on)	—N/a	—N/a	5	1	0	0	0	5
Jean Droste	19 (substituted on)			19 (substituted on)	20	19 (substituted on)	—N/a	—N/a	3	0	0	0	0	0
Roelof Smit	20 (substituted on)	7					—N/a	—N/a	2	0	0	0	0	0
Ivan van Zyl	21 (substituted on)	21 (substituted on)			9	9	—N/a	—N/a	4	0	0	0	0	0
Marnitz Boshoff	22 (substituted on)	22 (substituted on)	10	22	22		—N/a	—N/a	3	0	1	1	0	5
Dylan Sage	23 (substituted on)	13	13	13	12	12	—N/a	—N/a	6	0	0	0	0	0
Wiehahn Herbst		3	3	3	3	3	—N/a	—N/a	5	0	0	0	0	0
Andries Ferreira		4	4		4	4	—N/a	—N/a	4	0	0	0	0	0
Adré Smith		19 (substituted on)	19 (substituted on)	4	19 (substituted on)		—N/a	—N/a	4	0	0	0	0	0
Marco van Staden		20 (substituted on)	7	7		6	—N/a	—N/a	4	1	0	0	0	5
Jade Stighling		23 (substituted on)	23				—N/a	—N/a	1	0	0	0	0	0
André Warner			21 (substituted on)	21 (substituted on)			—N/a	—N/a	2	0	0	0	0	0
Stedman Gans				23 (substituted on)	23 (substituted on)	23 (substituted on)	—N/a	—N/a	3	0	0	0	0	0
Fred Eksteen					6		—N/a	—N/a	1	0	0	0	0	0
Madot Mabokela					17 (substituted on)		—N/a	—N/a	1	0	0	0	0	0
Lizo Gqoboka						1	—N/a	—N/a	1	1	0	0	0	5
Corniel Els						16 (substituted on)	—N/a	—N/a	1	0	0	0	0	0
Vaughen Isaacs						22 (substituted on)	—N/a	—N/a	1	0	1	0	0	2
Total									6	20	11	7	0	143

Free State Cheetahs
Name	BUL	GRQ	LIO	SHA	PMA	WPr	SHA	LIO	App	Try	Con	Pen	DG	Pts
Ox Nché	1	17	1	17 (substituted on)	17 (substituted on)	17 (substituted on)	1	1	7	2	0	0	0	10
Joseph Dweba	2	2	2	2	16 (substituted on)	2	2	2	8	7	0	0	0	35
Aranos Coetzee	3	3	3	3	18 (substituted on)	18 (substituted on)			6	0	0	0	0	0
Sintu Manjezi	4	4	4	4	19 (substituted on)	4	4	4	8	0	0	0	0	0
Walt Steenkamp	5	5	5	19 (substituted on)	4	5	5	5	8	2	0	0	0	10
Junior Pokomela	6	6	7	6	7	6	6	7	8	3	0	0	0	15
Abongile Nonkontwana	7	7	20 (substituted on)	7	20 (substituted on)	7	7	21 (substituted on)	8	0	0	0	0	0
Henco Venter	8	8	8	8	8	8	8	8	8	2	0	0	0	10
Tian Meyer	9	9	9	9	11	11	11	11	8	1	0	0	0	5
Tian Schoeman	10	10	10			10	10	10	6	0	16	3	0	41
Rabz Maxwane	11	11	11	11					4	1	0	0	0	5
Dries Swanepoel	12	12	12	12	12	22 (substituted on)	12	12	8	2	0	0	0	10
Benhard Janse van Rensburg	13	13	13	13	13	13	13	13	8	5	1	0	0	27
William Small-Smith	14	14			14	12	14	14	6	5	0	0	0	25
Louis Fouché	15	23 (substituted on)	23 (substituted on)	10	10	23 (substituted on)	22 (substituted on)	22 (substituted on)	8	3	9	3	0	42
Jacques du Toit	16 (substituted on)	16 (substituted on)	16 (substituted on)	16 (substituted on)	2	16 (substituted on)	16 (substituted on)	16 (substituted on)	8	0	0	0	0	0
Charles Marais	17 (substituted on)	1	17 (substituted on)	1				17 (substituted on)	5	0	0	0	0	0
Reinach Venter	18 (substituted on)	18 (substituted on)	18 (substituted on)				18 (substituted on)	18 (substituted on)	5	0	0	0	0	0
JP du Preez	19 (substituted on)	19 (substituted on)	19 (substituted on)	5	5	19	19 (substituted on)	19 (substituted on)	7	0	0	0	0	0
Jasper Wiese	20 (substituted on)			21 (substituted on)	21 (substituted on)	21 (substituted on)	20 (substituted on)	20 (substituted on)	6	4	0	0	0	20
Gerhard Olivier	21 (substituted on)	21 (substituted on)	21 (substituted on)	20 (substituted on)	6	20 (substituted on)	21 (substituted on)	6	8	0	0	0	0	0
Dian Badenhorst	22 (substituted on)	22 (substituted on)		22	22				2	0	0	0	0	0
Darren Adonis	23 (substituted on)	15	15			14	23 (substituted on)	23 (substituted on)	6	2	0	0	0	10
Marnus van der Merwe		20 (substituted on)	6						2	1	0	0	0	5
Tapiwa Mafura			14		23				1	0	0	0	0	0
Ruan Pienaar			22 (substituted on)	23 (substituted on)	9	9	9	9	6	2	9	1	0	31
Carel-Jan Coetzee				14					1	1	0	0	0	5
Clayton Blommetjies				15	15	15	15	15	5	2	0	0	0	10
Erich de Jager				18 (substituted on)	3		3	3	4	0	0	0	0	0
Schalk van der Merwe					1	1	17 (substituted on)		3	0	0	0	0	0
Boan Venter						3			1	0	0	0	0	0
Total									8	45	35	7	0	316

Golden Lions
Name	PMA	WPr	FSC	BUL	SHA	GRQ	GRQ	FSC	App	Try	Con	Pen	DG	Pts
Dylan Smith	1					17 (substituted on)	17 (substituted on)	1	4	0	0	0	0	0
Jan-Henning Campher	2		16 (substituted on)	16 (substituted on)	16 (substituted on)	16 (substituted on)	16 (substituted on)	16 (substituted on)	7	0	0	0	0	0
Johannes Jonker	3	3	3	3		18 (substituted on)	18 (substituted on)	18 (substituted on)	7	0	0	0	0	0
Rhyno Herbst	4			19 (substituted on)	19 (substituted on)				3	0	0	0	0	0
Reinhard Nothnagel	5		19 (substituted on)	5					3	0	0	0	0	0
Marnus Schoeman	6	6	6	6	21 (substituted on)	6	6	6	8	2	0	0	0	10
Vincent Tshituka	7	7	7	20 (substituted on)					4	0	0	0	0	0
James Venter	8	20 (substituted on)	20 (substituted on)	21 (substituted on)	6			23 (substituted on)	6	2	0	0	0	10
Ross Cronjé	9	9	9	9	9	9	9	9	8	0	0	0	0	0
Shaun Reynolds	10	10	10	10	10	10	10	10	8	4	23	9	0	93
Stean Pienaar	11	11	11	11	11	11	11	11	8	4	0	0	0	20
Wayne van der Bank	12								1	0	0	0	0	0
Wandisile Simelane	13	13	13	13	13	13	13	13	8	2	0	0	0	10
Madosh Tambwe	14	14	14	14	14	14	14	14	8	7	0	0	0	35
Tyrone Green	15	15	15	15	15	15	15	15	8	5	0	0	0	25
Pieter Jansen	16 (substituted on)	2	2	2	2	2	2	2	8	2	0	0	0	10
Sti Sithole	17 (substituted on)	1	1	1	1	1	1		7	0	0	0	0	0
Jacobie Adriaanse	18 (substituted on)	18 (substituted on)	18 (substituted on)		18 (substituted on)	3	3	3	7	0	0	0	0	0
Ruben Schoeman	19 (substituted on)	4	4	4	4	4	4	4	8	1	0	0	0	5
Len Massyn	20 (substituted on)	21 (substituted on)	21	7	7	20 (substituted on)	20 (substituted on)	20 (substituted on)	7	0	0	0	0	0
Dillon Smit	21 (substituted on)	22 (substituted on)	22 (substituted on)	22 (substituted on)	22 (substituted on)	21 (substituted on)	21 (substituted on)	21 (substituted on)	8	1	0	0	0	5
Manuel Rass	22 (substituted on)	23 (substituted on)	23 (substituted on)		12				4	0	0	0	0	0
Jan-Louis la Grange	23 (substituted on)	12	12			22 (substituted on)	22 (substituted on)	22 (substituted on)	6	0	0	0	0	0
Marvin Orie		5				5	5	5	4	0	0	0	0	0
Hacjivah Dayimani		8	8	8	8	8	8	8	7	1	0	0	0	5
PJ Botha		16 (substituted on)							1	0	0	0	0	0
Leo Kruger		17 (substituted on)	17 (substituted on)	17 (substituted on)					3	0	0	0	0	0
Wilhelm van der Sluys		19 (substituted on)	5		5	19 (substituted on)	19 (substituted on)	19 (substituted on)	6	0	0	0	0	0
Eddie Fouché				12					1	0	0	0	0	0
Chergin Fillies				18 (substituted on)					1	0	0	0	0	0
Duncan Matthews				23 (substituted on)	23 (substituted on)	12	12	12	5	0	0	0	0	0
Frans van Wyk					3				1	0	0	0	0	0
Nathan McBeth					17			17 (substituted on)	1	0	0	0	0	0
Cyle Brink					20 (substituted on)	7	7	7	4	0	0	0	0	0
Jamba Ulengo						23 (substituted on)	23 (substituted on)		2	0	0	0	0	0
penalty try									–	1	–	–	–	7
Total									8	32	23	9	0	235

Griquas
Name	SHA	PMA	FSC	BUL	WPr	LIO	LIO	F	App	Try	Con	Pen	DG	Pts
Khwezi Mona	1	1	1	1	1		1	—N/a	6	0	0	0	0	0
AJ le Roux	2	2	2	2	2	2	2	—N/a	7	1	0	0	0	5
Ewald van der Westhuizen	3	3	3	3	3	3	3	—N/a	7	1	0	0	0	5
Ian Groenewald	4	4	4	4	4	4	4	—N/a	7	0	0	0	0	0
Victor Sekekete	5	5	18 (substituted on)	5	5	5	5	—N/a	7	1	0	0	0	5
Gideon van der Merwe	6	6	6	6	19 (substituted on)	6	6	—N/a	7	2	0	0	0	10
Sias Koen	7	7	7	7	7	7	7	—N/a	7	0	0	0	0	0
Niell Jordaan	8	8	8	8	8	8	19 (substituted on)	—N/a	7	0	0	0	0	0
Zak Burger	9	9	9	9	9			—N/a	5	3	0	0	0	15
George Whitehead	10	10	15	10	10	10	10	—N/a	7	0	19	13	0	77
Enver Brandt	11							—N/a	1	0	0	0	0	0
André Swarts	12	12		12	12	12		—N/a	5	1	0	0	0	5
Michal Haznar	13	13	12	13	13	13	13	—N/a	7	1	0	0	0	5
Ederies Arendse	14	14	14	14	14	14	14	—N/a	7	3	0	0	0	15
Anthony Volmink	15	15		15	15	15	15	—N/a	6	2	0	0	0	10
Wilmar Arnoldi	16 (substituted on)	16 (substituted on)	16 (substituted on)	16 (substituted on)	16 (substituted on)	16 (substituted on)	16 (substituted on)	—N/a	7	3	0	0	0	15
Nqoba Mxoli	17 (substituted on)	17	17 (substituted on)	17 (substituted on)	17 (substituted on)	1	17 (substituted on)	—N/a	6	0	0	0	0	0
Johan Momsen	18 (substituted on)	18 (substituted on)	5	18 (substituted on)	18 (substituted on)	18	18 (substituted on)	—N/a	6	0	0	0	0	0
Zandré Jordaan	19 (substituted on)	19	19 (substituted on)	19 (substituted on)	6		8	—N/a	5	0	0	0	0	0
Chriswill September	20 (substituted on)	20	20 (substituted on)	20 (substituted on)	20 (substituted on)	9	20 (substituted on)	—N/a	6	0	1	0	0	2
Tinus de Beer	21 (substituted on)	21 (substituted on)	10				21	—N/a	3	0	0	1	0	3
Eduan Keyter	22 (substituted on)	11	13	11	11	11	11	—N/a	7	4	0	0	0	20
NJ Oosthuizen	23 (substituted on)					17 (substituted on)		—N/a	2	0	0	0	0	0
Bjorn Basson		22 (substituted on)	11		22 (substituted on)	22	22	—N/a	3	0	0	0	0	0
Ruan Kramer		23 (substituted on)	23 (substituted on)	23 (substituted on)	23 (substituted on)	23 (substituted on)	23 (substituted on)	—N/a	6	0	0	0	0	0
Chris Smit			21 (substituted on)	21 (substituted on)	21	21	12	—N/a	3	1	0	0	0	5
Grant Hermanus			22 (substituted on)					—N/a	1	0	0	0	0	0
Godfrey Ramaboea				22 (substituted on)				—N/a	1	0	0	0	0	0
Conway Pretorius						19 (substituted on)		—N/a	1	0	0	0	0	0
Christiaan Meyer						20 (substituted on)	9	—N/a	2	0	0	0	0	0
Total									7	23	20	14	0	197

Pumas
Name	LIO	GRQ	BUL	SHA	WPr	FSC	SF	F	App	Try	Con	Pen	DG	Pts
Andrew Beerwinkel	1	1	1	1	1	1	—N/a	—N/a	6	1	0	0	0	5
Marko Janse van Rensburg	2	2	2	2	2	2	—N/a	—N/a	6	0	0	0	0	0
Marné Coetzee	3	3	3	3	3	3	—N/a	—N/a	6	0	0	0	0	0
Le Roux Roets	4	4	4	4	4	4	—N/a	—N/a	6	1	0	0	0	5
Stefan Willemse	5	5	5	5	5	5	—N/a	—N/a	6	0	0	0	0	0
Jeandré Rudolph	6	6	8	8	8	6	—N/a	—N/a	6	1	0	0	0	5
Carel du Preez	7	7				7	—N/a	—N/a	3	1	0	0	0	5
Willie Engelbrecht	8	8	7	7	7	8	—N/a	—N/a	6	1	0	0	0	5
Reynier van Rooyen	9	9	20 (substituted on)				—N/a	—N/a	3	0	0	0	0	0
Kobus Marais	10	10	21 (substituted on)	21 (substituted on)	21 (substituted on)	21 (substituted on)	—N/a	—N/a	6	0	7	4	0	26
Etienne Taljaard	11	11	11	11	11		—N/a	—N/a	5	2	0	0	0	10
Ryan Nell	12	13	13	13	12		—N/a	—N/a	5	1	0	0	0	5
Neil Maritz	13						—N/a	—N/a	1	0	0	0	0	0
Morné Joubert	14	14	14	14	14	14	—N/a	—N/a	6	1	0	0	0	5
Devon Williams	15	15	15	15	15	15	—N/a	—N/a	6	1	0	0	0	5
Corniel Els	16 (substituted on)						—N/a	—N/a	1	0	0	0	0	0
Wikus Groenewald	17 (substituted on)						—N/a	—N/a	1	0	0	0	0	0
Hilton Lobberts	18 (substituted on)	18 (substituted on)	18 (substituted on)	18 (substituted on)	18 (substituted on)	18 (substituted on)	—N/a	—N/a	6	0	0	0	0	0
Phumzile Maqondwana	19 (substituted on)	19 (substituted on)	19 (substituted on)	19 (substituted on)	19 (substituted on)	19 (substituted on)	—N/a	—N/a	6	0	0	0	0	0
Ashlon Davids	20 (substituted on)	20 (substituted on)	9	9	9	9	—N/a	—N/a	6	0	0	0	0	0
Chris Smith	21 (substituted on)	21 (substituted on)	10	10	10	10	—N/a	—N/a	6	1	8	8	0	45
Henko Marais	22 (substituted on)	12	12	12		12	—N/a	—N/a	5	0	0	0	0	0
Morgan Naudé	23 (substituted on)	23 (substituted on)	23 (substituted on)	23 (substituted on)	23 (substituted on)		—N/a	—N/a	5	2	0	0	0	10
Simon Westraadt		16 (substituted on)	16 (substituted on)	16 (substituted on)	16 (substituted on)	16 (substituted on)	—N/a	—N/a	5	1	0	0	0	5
De-Jay Terblanche		17 (substituted on)	17 (substituted on)	17 (substituted on)	17 (substituted on)	17 (substituted on)	—N/a	—N/a	5	0	0	0	0	0
Alwayno Visagie		22 (substituted on)	22 (substituted on)	22 (substituted on)	13	13	—N/a	—N/a	5	4	0	0	0	20
Francois Kleinhans			6	6	6		—N/a	—N/a	3	1	0	0	0	5
Ginter Smuts				20 (substituted on)	20 (substituted on)	20 (substituted on)	—N/a	—N/a	3	0	0	0	0	0
Ruwellyn Isbell					22 (substituted on)	22 (substituted on)	—N/a	—N/a	2	0	0	0	0	0
Luther Obi						11	—N/a	—N/a	1	0	0	0	0	0
Ngoni Chidoma						23 (substituted on)	—N/a	—N/a	1	0	0	0	0	0
Total									6	19	15	12	0	161

Sharks
Name	GRQ	WPr	PMA	FSC	LIO	BUL	FSC	F	App	Try	Con	Pen	DG	Pts
Juan Schoeman	1	1	1	17 (substituted on)	17 (substituted on)			—N/a	5	0	0	0	0	0
Kerron van Vuuren	2	2	2	2	2	2	2	—N/a	7	0	0	0	0	0
Coenie Oosthuizen	3	3	3	3		3	3	—N/a	6	0	0	0	0	0
Ruben van Heerden	4	4	4	4	4	4	4	—N/a	7	0	0	0	0	0
Hyron Andrews	5	5	5	5	5	5	5	—N/a	7	0	0	0	0	0
Luke Stringer	6	6	6					—N/a	3	0	0	0	0	0
Jacques Vermeulen	7	7	20 (substituted on)	7	7	7	7	—N/a	7	1	0	0	0	5
Tera Mtembu	8	8	8	8	8	8	8	—N/a	7	0	0	0	0	0
Cameron Wright	9	9	9	21 (substituted on)	21 (substituted on)	21 (substituted on)	21 (substituted on)	—N/a	7	1	0	0	0	5
Curwin Bosch	10	10	10	10			10	—N/a	5	3	9	8	1	60
Lwazi Mvovo	11	11	11	11	11	11	11	—N/a	7	4	0	0	0	20
Jeremy Ward	12	12	12	12	12	13	13	—N/a	7	3	0	0	0	15
JP Pietersen	13	13	13	13	13	23 (substituted on)	23 (substituted on)	—N/a	7	1	0	0	0	5
Kobus van Wyk	14	14	14	14	14	14	14	—N/a	7	4	0	0	0	20
Aphelele Fassi	15	23 (substituted on)	23 (substituted on)	15	15	15	15	—N/a	7	1	0	0	0	5
Craig Burden	16 (substituted on)	16 (substituted on)	16 (substituted on)	16 (substituted on)				—N/a	4	1	0	0	0	5
Mzamo Majola	17 (substituted on)	17 (substituted on)	17 (substituted on)	1	1	17 (substituted on)	17 (substituted on)	—N/a	7	0	0	0	0	0
John-Hubert Meyer	18 (substituted on)	18 (substituted on)	18 (substituted on)	18 (substituted on)	3	18 (substituted on)	18 (substituted on)	—N/a	7	0	0	0	0	0
Gideon Koegelenberg	19 (substituted on)	19 (substituted on)	19 (substituted on)	19 (substituted on)	19 (substituted on)	19 (substituted on)	19 (substituted on)	—N/a	7	0	0	0	0	0
Phepsi Buthelezi	20 (substituted on)	20 (substituted on)	7	6	6	6	6	—N/a	7	0	0	0	0	0
Sanele Nohamba	21 (substituted on)	21 (substituted on)	21 (substituted on)	9	9	9	9	—N/a	7	2	7	4	0	36
Marius Louw	22 (substituted on)	22 (substituted on)	22 (substituted on)	22 (substituted on)				—N/a	4	0	0	0	0	0
Rhyno Smith	23 (substituted on)	15	15	23 (substituted on)	22 (substituted on)	22 (substituted on)	22 (substituted on)	—N/a	7	1	3	0	0	11
Evan Roos				20 (substituted on)	20 (substituted on)			—N/a	2	0	0	0	0	0
Boeta Chamberlain					10	10		—N/a	2	0	0	0	1	3
Dylan Richardson					16 (substituted on)	16 (substituted on)	16 (substituted on)	—N/a	3	0	0	0	0	0
Khutha Mchunu					18 (substituted on)			—N/a	1	0	0	0	0	0
Leolin Zas					23 (substituted on)			—N/a	1	0	0	0	0	0
Thomas du Toit						1	1	—N/a	2	1	0	0	0	5
André Esterhuizen						12	12	—N/a	2	1	0	0	0	5
Andisa Ntsila						20 (substituted on)	20 (substituted on)	—N/a	2	0	0	0	0	0
Total									7	24	19	12	2	200

Western Province
Name	BUL	SHA	LIO	PMA	GRQ	FSC	SF	F	App	Try	Con	Pen	DG	Pts
Corné Fourie	1	1	1	1	1	1	—N/a	—N/a	6	0	0	0	0	0
Scarra Ntubeni	2	2	2	2		2	—N/a	—N/a	5	3	0	0	0	15
Wilco Louw	3	3	18 (substituted on)	3		3	—N/a	—N/a	5	1	0	0	0	5
Salmaan Moerat	4	4	4	19 (substituted on)	4	4	—N/a	—N/a	6	0	0	0	0	0
Chris van Zyl	5	5	5	5	5	5	—N/a	—N/a	6	0	0	0	0	0
Jaco Coetzee	6	8	20 (substituted on)				—N/a	—N/a	3	1	0	0	0	5
Ernst van Rhyn	7	6	6	7	6	6	—N/a	—N/a	6	1	0	0	0	5
Juarno Augustus	8					20 (substituted on)	—N/a	—N/a	2	1	0	0	0	5
Justin Phillips	9	9		9	9	9	—N/a	—N/a	5	1	0	0	0	5
Jean-Luc du Plessis	10	10		22 (substituted on)		22 (substituted on)	—N/a	—N/a	4	0	2	0	0	4
Edwill van der Merwe	11	11	11	23 (substituted on)	23 (substituted on)		—N/a	—N/a	5	0	0	0	0	0
Dan Kriel	12	12	12	12	12		—N/a	—N/a	5	0	0	0	0	0
Ruhan Nel	13	13	13	13	13	13	—N/a	—N/a	6	3	0	0	0	15
Seabelo Senatla	14	14	14	11	11	23 (substituted on)	—N/a	—N/a	6	4	0	0	0	20
SP Marais	15	15			15	11	—N/a	—N/a	4	0	8	9	0	43
Chad Solomon	16 (substituted on)	16 (substituted on)	16 (substituted on)	16 (substituted on)	2	16	—N/a	—N/a	5	0	0	0	0	0
Kwenzo Blose	17 (substituted on)	17 (substituted on)	17 (substituted on)	17 (substituted on)	17 (substituted on)	17 (substituted on)	—N/a	—N/a	6	0	0	0	0	0
Carlü Sadie	18 (substituted on)	18 (substituted on)	3		3		—N/a	—N/a	4	0	0	0	0	0
JD Schickerling	19 (substituted on)	7	7	4	7	7	—N/a	—N/a	6	0	0	0	0	0
Sikhumbuzo Notshe	20 (substituted on)	20 (substituted on)	8	8	8	8	—N/a	—N/a	6	1	0	0	0	5
Godlen Masimla	21 (substituted on)	21 (substituted on)	21 (substituted on)	21 (substituted on)			—N/a	—N/a	4	0	0	0	0	0
Joshua Stander	22 (substituted on)	22 (substituted on)	10	10	10		—N/a	—N/a	5	1	7	0	0	19
Craig Barry	23 (substituted on)	23 (substituted on)					—N/a	—N/a	2	1	0	0	0	5
David Meihuizen		19 (substituted on)	19		19 (substituted on)		—N/a	—N/a	2	0	0	0	0	0
Paul de Wet			9		21 (substituted on)	21 (substituted on)	—N/a	—N/a	3	1	0	0	0	5
Dillyn Leyds			15	15		15	—N/a	—N/a	3	2	0	0	0	10
Marno Redelinghuys			22				—N/a	—N/a	0	0	0	0	0	0
Sergeal Petersen			23 (substituted on)	14	14	14	—N/a	—N/a	4	1	0	0	0	5
Siya Kolisi				6			—N/a	—N/a	1	0	0	0	0	0
Neethling Fouché				18 (substituted on)	18 (substituted on)	18 (substituted on)	—N/a	—N/a	3	0	0	0	0	0
Nama Xaba				20 (substituted on)	20 (substituted on)	19 (substituted on)	—N/a	—N/a	3	1	0	0	0	5
Schalk Erasmus					16 (substituted on)		—N/a	—N/a	1	0	0	0	0	0
Damian Willemse					22 (substituted on)	10	—N/a	—N/a	2	0	0	0	0	0
Rikus Pretorius						12	—N/a	—N/a	1	0	0	0	0	0
Total									6	23	17	9	0	176

(c) denotes the team captain. For each match, the player's squad number is shown. Starting players are numbered 1 to 15, while the replacements are numbered 16 to 23. If a replacement made an appearance in the match, it is indicated by (substituted on) . "App" refers to the number of appearances made by the player, "Try" to the number of tries scored by the player, "Con" to the number of conversions kicked, "Pen" to the number of penalties kicked, "DG" to the number of drop goals kicked and "Pts" refer to the total number of points scored by the player.

== Referees ==
The following referees officiated matches in the 2019 Currie Cup Premier Division:

2019 Currie Cup Premier Division referees
Stuart Berry • AJ Jacobs • Cwengile Jadezweni • Jaco Peyper • Rasta Rasivhenge • Egon Seconds • Divan Uys • Marius van der Westhuizen

== See also ==
- 2019 Currie Cup First Division
- 2019 Rugby Challenge
