= 2017 Under-21 Provincial Championship =

- Countries: South Africa
- Date: 25 August – 28 October 2017
- Champions: Western Province U21
- Runners-up: Blue Bulls U21
- Matches played: 24
- Tries scored: 254 (average 10.6 per match)
- Top point scorer: Tiaan Swanepoel, Western Province U21 (123)
- Top try scorer: Xolisa Guma, Blue Bulls U21 (11)

The 2017 Under-21 Provincial Championship was the 2017 edition of the Under-21 Provincial Championship, an annual national Under-21 rugby union competition held in South Africa, and was contested from 25 August to 28 October 2017.

The competition was won by Western Province U21, after they beat Blue Bulls U21 48–41 in the final in Durban. Western Province U21 fly-half Tiaan Swanepoel was the top scorer in the competition with 123 points, while Blue Bulls U21 wing Xolisa Guma was the top try scorer with 11 tries.

== Competition rules and information ==
There were seven participating teams in the 2017 Under-21 Provincial Championship. They played each other once during the pool stage, either at home or away. Teams received four points for a win and two points for a draw. Bonus points were awarded to teams that scored four or more tries in a game, as well as to teams that lost a match by seven points or less. Teams were ranked by log points, then points difference (points scored less points conceded).

The top four teams in the pool stage qualified for the semifinals, which were followed by a final.

== Teams ==
The teams that played in the 2017 Under-21 Provincial Championship were:

Location of teams in the 2017 Under-21 Provincial Championship

2017 Under-21 Provincial Championship teams
Team name	Stadium
Blue Bulls U21	Loftus Versfeld, Pretoria
Eastern Province U21	Nelson Mandela Bay Stadium, Port Elizabeth
Free State U21	Free State Stadium, Bloemfontein
Golden Lions U21	Ellis Park Stadium, Johannesburg
Leopards U21	Olën Park, Potchefstroom
Sharks U21	Kings Park Stadium, Durban
Western Province U21	Newlands Stadium, Cape Town

== Pool stage ==
=== Standings ===
The final standings of the 2017 Under-21 Provincial Championship Pool Stage were:

2017 Under-21 Provincial Championship log
Pos	Team	P	W	D	L	PF	PA	PD	TF	TA	TB	LB	Pts
1	Blue Bulls U21	6	6	0	0	339	188	+151	47	24	6	0	30
2	Golden Lions U21	6	5	0	1	283	125	+158	42	16	4	0	24
3	Western Province U21	6	4	0	2	255	89	+166	35	11	3	1	20
4	Free State U21	6	3	0	3	203	203	0	28	30	4	1	17
5	Sharks U21	6	2	0	4	184	162	+22	26	22	4	2	14
6	Leopards U21	6	1	0	5	155	390	−235	23	58	4	1	9
7	Eastern Province U21	6	0	0	6	127	389	−262	19	59	3	0	3
Final standings.

Legend and competition rules
Legend:
Qualified for the semifinals.	P = Games played, W = Games won, D = Games drawn, L = Games lost, PF = Points for, PA = Points against, PD = Points difference, TF = Tries for, TA = Tries against, TB = Try bonus points, LB = Losing bonus points, Pts = Log points
Competition rules:
Qualification: The top four teams qualified for the semifinals. Points breakdown: * 4 points for a win * 2 points for a draw * 1 bonus point for a loss by seven points or less * 1 bonus point for scoring four or more tries in a match

=== Matches ===
==== Round one ====
25 August 2017	Golden Lions U21	78–17	Eastern Province U21	Ellis Park Stadium, Johannesburg
14:45	Try: Jo-Hanko de Villiers (2); Morné van den Berg; Wayne van der Bank; Jan-Louis la Grange; Xander Crause (4); Curtis Jonas; Madosh Tambwe (2); Con: Siya Masuku (6); Barend Smit; Eddie Fouché; Jaco Willemse	Scoreboard	Try: Hayden Tharratt; Michael Brink; Thulani Njenje; Con: Michael Brink	Referee: Thuso Mngqibisa

26 August 2017	Western Province U21	33–35	Blue Bulls U21	City Park Stadium, Athlone
12:00	Try: Juarno Augustus; Tristan Leyds; Herschel Jantjies; Con: Joshua Vermeulen (3); Pen: Joshua Vermeulen (4)	Scoreboard	Try: Johan Grobbelaar; Denzel Hill; Franco Naudé; Andell Loubser; Con: Tinus de Beer (3); Pen: Tinus de Beer (3)	Referee: Stephan Geldenhuys

26 August 2017	Free State U21	31–27	Leopards U21	Free State Stadium, Bloemfontein
14:45	Try: Junior Pokomela; Niell Stannard; Erich de Jager (2); Con: Tikz Madonsela; Muller Joubert (3); Pen: Muller Joubert	Scoreboard	Try: Sibusiso Mlangeni; Shakeel Fredericks; De Wet Terblanche; Jan Daniel Olckers du Plooy; Con: Tokkie Kasselman; Hendrik Mulder; Pen: Tokkie Kasselman	Referee: Jaco Kotze

Bye/s: Sharks U21

==== Round two ====
1 September 2017	Blue Bulls U21	53–32	Free State U21	Loftus Versfeld, Pretoria
16:00	Try: Rieckert Korff; Xolisa Guma; Erich Cronjé; Heino Bezuidenhout; Andell Loubser (2); Duan Joe du Plessis; PJ Toerien; Con: Tinus de Beer (4); Andell Loubser; Pen: Tinus de Beer	Scoreboard	Try: Jaywinn Juries; Niell Stannard; Marnus van der Merwe (2); Ewan Coetzee; Con: Ruan Wasserman; Kwagga Taylor; Pen: Kwagga Taylor	Referee: Ruhan Meiring

2 September 2017	Eastern Province U21	7–54	Sharks U21	WJ de Wet Stadium, Despatch
15:00	Try: Lupumlo Mguca; Con: Michael Brink	Scoreboard	Try: Khutha Mchunu; Kwanda Dimaza; Ilunga Mukendi; Cornelius Otto; Taigh Schoor (2); Andrew Evans; William Squires; Con: Alwayno Visagie (3); Morné Joubert (4)	Referee: Paul Mente

2 September 2017	Leopards U21	8–95	Golden Lions U21	Olën Park, Potchefstroom
15:30	Try: Zandré du Plessis; Pen: Hendrik Mulder	Scoreboard	Try: Le Roux Baard; Jaco Willemse; Morné Moos (2); Jo-Hanko de Villiers (2); Morné van den Berg (2); Kwanele Ngema; Eddie Fouché (3); Xander Crause; Curtis Jonas; Boeta Vermaak; Con: Siya Masuku (7); Eddie Fouché (3)	Referee: Pieter Maritz

Bye/s: Western Province U21

==== Round three ====
8 September 2017	Sharks U21	38–24	Leopards U21	KP2, Kings Park, Durban
14:00	Try: Kwanda Dimaza; Benhard Janse van Rensburg; Tristan Blewett; Courtney Winnaar (2) penalty try Con: Courtney Winnaar (3)	Scoreboard	Try: Edmund Rheeder; Shakeel Fredericks; De Wet Terblanche; Reuben du Plooy; Con: Tokkie Kasselman (2)	Referee: Pablo Deluca

8 September 2017	Free State U21	10–36	Western Province U21	Old Greys RC, Bloemfontein
14:45	Try: Bertus de Bod; Con: Ruan Wasserman; Pen: Ruan Wasserman	Scoreboard	Try: Ruben de Villiers; Edwill van der Merwe; Duncan Saal; Tiaan Swanepoel (2); Con: Tiaan Swanepoel (4); Pen: Tiaan Swanepoel	Referee: Ben Crouse

8 September 2017	Golden Lions U21	25–49	Blue Bulls U21	Ellis Park Stadium, Johannesburg
15:00	Try: Manuel Rass; Madosh Tambwe (2); Con: Siya Masuku (2); Pen: Siya Masuku (2)	Scoreboard	Try: Jan-Henning Campher; Dylan van der Walt; Tinus de Beer; Franco Naudé; Stedman Gans; Divan Rossouw; Con: Tinus de Beer (5); Pen: Tinus de Beer (3)	Referee: Ruhan Meiring

Bye/s: Eastern Province U21

==== Round four ====
15 September 2017	Leopards U21	56–40	Eastern Province U21	Olën Park, Potchefstroom
14:00	Try: Botter Moloto (2); Edmund Rheeder; Nkosana Mathaba; Jandré Grobler; Robert Hunt; Damon Lee penalty try Con: Tokkie Kasselman (7)	Scoreboard	Try: Hayden Tharratt; Josiah Twum-Baofo (3); Keanu Vers; Davian Swanepoel; Con: Michael Brink (5)	Referee: Ben Crouse

15 September 2017	Blue Bulls U21	37–34	Sharks U21	Loftus Versfeld B, Pretoria
15:00	Try: Jan-Henning Campher; Denzel Hill; Embrose Papier; Irvin Ali; Andell Loubser; Con: Tinus de Beer (2); Andell Loubser; Pen: Tinus de Beer; Andell Loubser	Scoreboard	Try: Alwayno Visagie; Mfundo Ndhlovu (2); Cliven Loubser; Con: Cliven Loubser (4); Pen: Cliven Loubser (2)	Referee: Damon Murphy

16 September 2017	Western Province U21	12–20	Golden Lions U21	City Park Stadium, Athlone
13:45	Try: Herschel Jantjies; Cornel Smit; Con: Tiaan Swanepoel	Scoreboard	Try: Bradley Thain; Stephen Bhashera; Constant Beckerling; Con: Eddie Fouché; Pen: Eddie Fouché	Referee: Jaco Pretorius

Bye/s: Free State U21

==== Round five ====
22 September 2017	Golden Lions U21	29–24	Free State U21	Ellis Park Stadium, Johannesburg
15:00	Try: Chergin Fillies; Len Massyn; Hacjivah Dayimani; Jan-Louis la Grange; Con: Siya Masuku (3); Pen: Siya Masuku	Scoreboard	Try: Marnus van der Merwe (2); Con: Tiaan Schutte; Pen: Tiaan Schutte (4)	Referee: Archie Sehlako

23 September 2017	Sharks U21	10–19	Western Province U21	Kings Park Stadium, Durban
13:00	Try: Bandisa Ndlovu; Con: Cliven Loubser; Pen: Cliven Loubser	Scoreboard	Try: Juarno Augustus; Con: Tiaan Swanepoel; Pen: Tiaan Swanepoel (4)	Referee: Ruhan Meiring

23 September 2017	Eastern Province U21	31–57	Blue Bulls U21	Nelson Mandela Bay Stadium, Port Elizabeth
17:00	Try: Mulalo Thapelo Sadiki (2); Keanu Vers; Dwayne Prince; Con: Henrique Olivier (2); Jordan Koekemoer (2); Pen: Henrique Olivier	Scoreboard	Try: Eduan Lubbe; Boeta Hamman; Xolisa Guma (5); Adriaan Burger; Dale Hendricks; Con: Kurt Webster (4); Earll Douwrie (2)	Referee: Stephan Geldenhuys

Bye/s: Leopards U21

==== Round six ====
30 September 2017	Western Province U21	77–7	Eastern Province U21	City Park Stadium, Athlone
12:00	Try: Ruben de Villiers; Nyasha Tarusenga (2); Paul de Wet (3); Tiaan Swanepoel; Edwill van der Merwe (2); Duncan Saal (2); Nico Leonard; Con: Tiaan Swanepoel (7); Pen: Tiaan Swanepoel	Scoreboard	Try: Michael Botha; Con: Henrique Olivier	Referee: Ricus van der Hoven

30 September 2017	Free State U21	39–33	Sharks U21	Shimla Park, Bloemfontein
12:30	Try: Sibabalo Qoma; Lomb Lombaard; Marnus van der Merwe (3); Ewan Coetzee; Con: Lomb Lombaard (2); Tiaan Schutte; Pen: Lomb Lombaard	Scoreboard	Try: Grant Williams (2); Ilunga Mukendi; Morné Joubert; Matthew Kriel; Con: Cliven Loubser (4)	Referee: Paul Mente

1 October 2017	Blue Bulls U21	108–33	Leopards U21	Loftus Versfeld, Pretoria
12:00	Try: Ig Prinsloo; Eduan Lubbe; Embrose Papier; Andell Loubser (2); Franco Naudé; Stedman Gans (2); Xolisa Guma (3); Divan Rossouw (3); Irvin Ali; Con: Tinus de Beer (7); Kurt Webster (8); Pen: Tinus de Beer	Scoreboard	Try: Zandré du Plessis; Marco Donges; Victor Maruping; Justin Meintjies; Shadley Ethan Dazel; Con: Marco Donges (4)	Referee: Jaco Pretorius

Bye/s: Golden Lions U21

==== Round seven ====
6 October 2017	Sharks U21	15–36	Golden Lions U21	KP2, Kings Park, Durban
13:45	Try: Bandisa Ndlovu; Morné Joubert; Con: Benhard Janse van Rensburg; Drop: Benhard Janse van Rensburg	Scoreboard	Try: Kevin du Randt; Constant Beckerling (2); Madosh Tambwe; HP van Schoor; Con: Siya Masuku (4); Drop: Siya Masuku	Referee: Jaco Kotze

6 October 2017	Leopards U21	7–78	Western Province U21	Olën Park, Potchefstroom
15:45	Try: Nkosana Mathaba; Con: Marco Donges	Scoreboard	Try: Ruben de Villiers; Daniel Maree; Juarno Augustus (2); Herschel Jantjies; Tiaan Swanepoel; Michaine Fick; David Brits; Duncan Saal; Paul de Wet; Mujaahid van der Hoven; Japan Cupido; Con: Tiaan Swanepoel (6); Japan Cupido (3)	Referee: Paul Mente

7 October 2017	Eastern Province U21	25–67	Free State U21	WJ de Wet Stadium, Despatch
13:30	Try: Robin Stevens; Dwayne Prince; Mziwamadoda Goba; Davian Swanepoel; Con: Henrique Olivier; Pen: Henrique Olivier	Scoreboard	Try: Kwenzo Blose; Marnus van der Merwe; Boan Venter (2); Ruben Schoeman; Dian Badenhorst; Ruan Henning; Kurt Eybers; Tiaan Schutte; JC Jansen van Vuuren; Con: Tiaan Schutte (7); Pen: Tiaan Schutte	Referee: Lloyd Linton

Bye/s: Blue Bulls U21

== Title play-offs ==
=== Semifinals ===
20 October 2017	Golden Lions U21	36–37	Western Province U21	Ellis Park Stadium, Johannesburg
14:30	Try: HP van Schoor; Jaco Willemse; Hacjivah Dayimani; Xander Crause; Barend Smit; Con: Siya Masuku (2); Eddie Fouché (2); Pen: Eddie Fouché	Scoreboard	Try: Tiaan Swanepoel (2); Edwill van der Merwe (2); Con: Tiaan Swanepoel (4); Pen: Tiaan Swanepoel (3)	Referee: Jaco Pretorius

20 October 2017	Blue Bulls U21	83–17	Free State U21	Loftus Versfeld, Pretoria
15:00	Try: Gerhard Steenekamp; Denzel Hill (3); Embrose Papier; Stedman Gans (2); Xolisa Guma (2); Andell Loubser; Heino Bezuidenhout (2); Con: Tinus de Beer (6); Kurt Webster (4); Pen: Tinus de Beer	Scoreboard	Try: JC Jansen van Vuuren; Robbie Petzer; Con: Robbie Petzer (2); Pen: Lomb Lombaard	Referee: Archie Sehlako

=== Final ===
28 October 2017	Blue Bulls U21	41–48	Western Province U21	Kings Park Stadium, Durban
13:00	Try: Embrose Papier (3); Andell Loubser; Stedman Gans; Johan Grobbelaar; Con: Tinus de Beer (2); Kurt Webster (2); Pen: Tinus de Beer	Scoreboard	Try: Juarno Augustus; Herschel Jantjies; David Brits; Duncan Saal (2); Con: Tiaan Swanepoel (4); Pen: Tiaan Swanepoel (3); Drop: Herschel Jantjies; Tiaan Swanepoel	Referee: Stephan Geldenhuys

== Honours ==
The honour roll for the 2017 Under-21 Provincial Championship was as follows:

2017 Under-21 Provincial Championship
Champions:	Western Province U21
Top points scorer:	Tiaan Swanepoel, Western Province U21 (123)
Top try scorer:	Xolisa Guma, Blue Bulls U21 (11)

== Players ==
The following squads were named for the 2017 Under-21 Provincial Championship:

Blue Bulls U21 squad
Irvin Ali • Josh Allderman • Heino Bezuidenhout • Jaco Bezuidenhout • Adriaan Burger • Jan-Henning Campher • Erich Cronjé • Meezus da Silva • Tinus de Beer • Earll Douwrie • Duan Joe du Plessis • Aston Fortuin • Stedman Gans • Johan Grobbelaar • Erik Groenewald • Xolisa Guma • Boeta Hamman • MJ Hayes • Dale Hendricks • Denzel Hill • JT Jackson • Rieckert Korff • Josefa Lalabalavu • Manie Libbok • Andell Loubser • Eduan Lubbe • Madot Mabokela • Simphiwe Matanzima • Garrick Mattheus • Tiny Mukhari • Franco Naudé • Reagan Oranje • Embrose Papier • Ig Prinsloo • Divan Rossouw • Mornay Smith • Eli Snyman • Gerhard Steenekamp • PJ Toerien • Franco van den Berg • Dylan van der Walt • Dean van der Westhuizen • Ruben van Heerden • Luigy van Jaarsveld • Marius Verwey • Kurt Webster

Eastern Province U21 squad
Lusanda Badiyana • Tango Balekile • Dominique Barendse • Charl Barthers • Tembekile Boltina • Jonathan Booysen • Michael Botha • Michael Brink • Ryan Calitz • Wihan Coetzer • X Daniels • Luyolo Dapula • Dandré Delport • Kamvelihle Bongani Dilima • Mziwamadoda Goba • Righardt Gouws • Luciano Grootboom • Jordan Koekemoer • André Lategan • Rivan Lemmer • Rob Lyons • Kuhle Makhoabane • Fabio Mapaling • Athi Mayinje • Masikane Mazwi • Lupumlo Mguca • Thapelo Molapo • Dayle Nel • Rouche Nel • Sibusiso Ngcokovane • Thulani Njenje • Yamkela Nyalambisa • Henrique Olivier • Brandon O'Neill • Dwayne Prince • Mulalo Thapelo Sadiki • Robin Stevens • Davian Swanepoel • Hayden Tharratt • Josiah Twum-Baofo • Alandré van Rooyen • Pieter Andries van Taak • Grant Venter • Keanu Vers • Daniel Voigt • Xandré Vos

Free State U21 squad
Francois Agenbach • Dian Badenhorst • Kwenzo Blose • Jacobus Botha • Janu Botha • Janco Cloete • Abraham Coetzee • Ewan Coetzee • Bertus de Bod • Erich de Jager • Chrisjan du Toit • Shelwynn Dyssel • Essie Esterhuizen • Kurt Eybers • William Eybers • Ruan Henning • JC Jansen van Vuuren • Alex Jonker • Muller Joubert • Jaywinn Juries • Roger Khuse • Jan Kotze • Andrew Kuhn • Lomb Lombaard • Gerhardus Jacobus Lombard • Tikz Madonsela • Box Mahlasela • JP Mans • Phumzile Maqondwana • Asithandile Mrubata • Thabiso Lindokuhle Msiza • Christiaan Nel • Petrus Johannes Nienaber • Hannie Pelser • Robbie Petzer • Junior Pokomela • Charl Pretorius • Sibabalo Qoma • George Rossouw • Ruben Schoeman • Tiaan Schutte • Ettiene Shalk • Jean Smal • Niell Stannard • Kwagga Taylor • Marnus van der Merwe • Jarik van der Walt • Frikkie van der Westhuizen • Berco Venter • Boan Venter • Brendan Verster • Ruan Wasserman

Golden Lions U21 squad
Le Roux Baard • Rouxbann Baumann • Constant Beckerling • Driaan Bester • Niell Bezuidenhout • Stephen Bhashera • Bouts Botha • Xander Crause • Hacjivah Dayimani • Jo-Hanko de Villiers • Kevin du Randt • Tyreeq February • Chergin Fillies • Eddie Fouché • Rhyno Herbst • Curtis Jonas • Leo Kruger • Jan-Louis la Grange • Siya Luwaca • Len Massyn • Siya Masuku • Morné Moos • Kwanele Ngema • Reinhard Nothnagel • Manuel Rass • Dian Schoonees • Bheki Shongwe • Barend Smit • Adré Smith • Madosh Tambwe • Bradley Thain • Jacobus Tredoux • Morné van den Berg • Wayne van der Bank • HP van Schoor • Boeta Vermaak • Jaco Willemse

Leopards U21 squad
Dougie Bruce-Smith • Shadley Ethan Dazel • Naps de Beer • Marco Donges • Zandré du Plessis • Jan Daniel Olckers du Plooy • Reuben du Plooy • Andries Engelbrecht • James Edward Engelbrecht • Shakeel Fredericks • Rashard Ian Fuller • Jandré Grobler • Rocky Groenewald • Edward Gareth Haas • Robert Hunt • Tokkie Kasselman • Garann Kriek • Damon Lee • Lipstick Louw • Paul Paseka Pitso Maluleke • Matimu Manganyi • Victor Maruping • Nkosana Mathaba • Justin Meintjies • Lyon Mkize • Sibusiso Mlangeni • Mlondi Mnisi • Botter Moloto • Hendrik Mulder • Gerik Mynhardt • Morne Piater • Edmund Rheeder • Brendan Strydom • Jaco Swanepoel • De Wet Terblanche • Franco Tiedt • Wikus van Biljon • Corne van der Merwe • JC van Schalkwyk • Stefan van Vuuren • Danie Juan-Jaques van Wyk • Ryno Visagie • Wihan von Wielligh • JP Wegner

Sharks U21 squad
Tristan Blewett • Franco Botha • Tony Botha • Ryan Carlson • Ngoni Chidoma • André Coetzee • Francois de Villiers • Brandon Dentlinger • Kwanda Dimaza • Tristan Tyler Dixon • Jordan Els • Andrew Evans • Divan Fick • Brandon Groenewald • Clifferd Jacobs • Benhard Janse van Rensburg • Morné Joubert • Christopher Klopper • Khail Kotzenberg • Matthew Kriel • Cliven Loubser • Khutha Mchunu • Michael Meyer • Morne Cashief Mkwayi • Ntuthuko Mthembu • Ilunga Mukendi • Mfundo Ndhlovu • Bandisa Ndlovu • Cornelius Otto • Marco Palvie • Coneree Poole • Taigh Schoor • Gareth Simpson • William Squires • Samuel Jay Swanepoel • James Tedder • Pierre van der Walt • Marnu van Niekerk • Lihan Viljoen • Alwayno Visagie • Danrich Visagie • Grant Williams • Courtney Winnaar • Rikus Zwart

Western Province U21 squad
Saud Abrahams • Ashwyn Adams • Kurt-Lee Arendse • Juarno Augustus • David Brits • Jordan Chait • Jaco Coetzee • Japan Cupido • Zain Davids • Ruben de Villiers • Paul de Wet • Brendon Esterhuizen • Michaine Fick • Keagan Fortune • Wikus Groenewald • Herschel Jantjies • Kuziwakwashe Kazembe • Eduan Keyter • Michael Kumbirai • Nico Leonard • Tristan Leyds • André Manuel • Daniel Maree • Lee-Marvin Mazibuko • David Meihuizen • Thomas Meyer • Percy Mngadi • Salmaan Moerat • Tumi Mogoje • Ryan Gregory Muller • Rocky Nwagbara • Joel Paarwater • Nico Peyper • Duncan Saal • Carlü Sadie • Jordan Sesink-Clee • Cornel Smit • Tiaan Swanepoel • Nyasha Tarusenga • Ruben Terblanche • Jubba Theys • Muller Uys • Mujaahid van der Hoven • Edwill van der Merwe • Ernst van Rhyn • Jacques van Zyl • Joshua Vermeulen • Cobus Wiese • Jondré Williams • Matt Wiseman • Nama Xaba • Eduard Zandberg

== See also ==
- 2017 Currie Cup Premier Division
- 2017 Currie Cup First Division
