= Jan-Henning Campher =

South African rugby union player

- Full name: Jan-Henning Campher
- Born: 10 December 1996 (age 29) Pretoria, South Africa
- Height: 1.86 m (6 ft 1 in)
- Weight: 110 kg (240 lb; 17 st 5 lb)
- School: Hoërskool Garsfontein
- University: University of Pretoria
- Notable relative: Lourens Campher (father)

Rugby union career
- Position: Hooker
- Current team: Pumas
Youth career
- 2014–2017: Blue Bulls
Senior career
Years	Team	Apps	(Points)
2016–2018	Blue Bulls XV	9	(5)
2017–2018	Blue Bulls	7	(0)
2019–2021	Lions	16	(0)
2019–2021	Golden Lions	13	(0)
2021–2024	Ealing Trailfinders	18	(50)
2024–present	Pumas	0	(0)
- Correct as of 3 April 2022
International career
Years	Team	Apps	(Points)
2014	South Africa Schools	3	(0)
2016	South Africa Under-20	5	(5)

Jan-Henning Campher (born 10 December 1996) is a South African professional rugby union player who currently plays for the Pumas in Currie Cup. His regular position is hooker.

== Youth rugby ==
In 2014, Campher represented South Africa Schools in the 2014 Under-18 International Series, playing in matches against France, Wales and England.

== South Africa Under-20 ==
He played in all five of South Africa Under-20s matches at the 2016 World Rugby Under 20 Championship in England. He played off the bench in their opening match in Pool C of the tournament as South Africa came from behind to beat Japan 59–19, and their next pool match as South Africa were beaten 13–19 by Argentina. He started in their final pool match as South Africa bounced back to secure a 40-31 bonus-point victory over France to secure a semi-final place as the best runner-up in the competition. He was also used as a replacement in the semifinal, as South Africa faced three-time champions England, with the hosts proving too strong for South Africa, knocking them out of the competition with a 39–17 victory – and started against Argentina in the third-place play-off final. Campher scored a try as Argentina beat South Africa convincingly, winning 49–19 and in the process condemning South Africa to fourth place in the competition.

== Blue Bulls ==
He made his first class debut for the Blue Bulls XV in the 2016 Currie Cup qualification series, coming on as a replacement in their 17–38 loss to neighbours Golden Lions XV in Alberton, and made a further three replacement appearances in the competition. Four starts followed in the 2017 Rugby Challenge, and he made his Currie Cup debut for the Blue Bulls in their opening match of the 2017 season, in a 51–45 win over Griquas in Kimberley. He started their next five matches before reverting to the Blue Bulls U21 squad for the 2017 Under-21 Provincial Championship.

== Ealing Trailfinders ==
In 2021, Campher signed with Ealing Trailfinders, an English professional rugby union club based in West London. Campher served as part of the Trailfinder squad who won the Championship in 21/22, hoping to be promoted to the Premiership. In February 2023 it was announced that Trailfinders were once again ineligible for promotion to the Premiership due to their ground not meeting the criteria. October 30, 2021, Campher completed a hat trick in the first half of the Championship against London Scottish. During their winning campaign in 21/22, Campher made 12 starts in the league and five appearances off the bench and amassed an impressive 10 tries. Campher was also included in the 22/23 Ealing Trailfinders squad.

== Personal life ==
Campher is the son of former Bulls prop Lourens Campher.
