= Boan Venter =

South African rugby union player

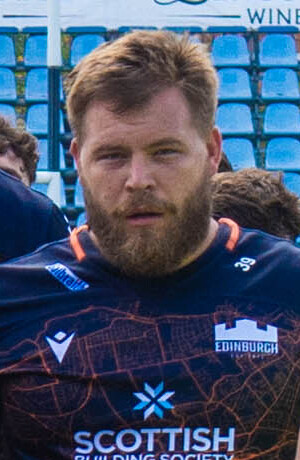
- Boan Venter wearing Rugby clothes.
- Full name: Abram Adrian Venter
- Born: 12 April 1997 (age 29) Kimberley, South Africa
- Height: 1.87 m (6 ft 1 1/2 in)
- Weight: 124 kg (273 lb)
- School: Hoërskool De Aar, De Aar

Rugby union career
- Position: Loosehead Prop
- Current team: Lions
Senior career
Years	Team	Apps	(Points)
2017–2021	Free State XV	19	(10)
2019–2021	Cheetahs	19	(15)
2019	→ Griffons	1	(0)
2019–2021	Free State Cheetahs	7	(0)
2021–2026	Edinburgh Rugby	108	(90)
2026–	Lions	6	(0)
- Correct as of 3 November 2026
International career
Years	Team	Apps	(Points)
2025	South Africa	7	(5)
2026	South Africa 'A'	1	(0)

Abram Adrian 'Boan' Venter (born 14 April 1997) is a South African rugby union player who currently plays for the Lions in the United Rugby Championship and in the Currie Cup, and internationally for South Africa.

== Rugby career ==
Venter was born in Kimberley. He represented Griquas at the 2015 Under-18 Craven Week tournament, before moving to Bloemfontein to join the Free State Cheetahs. He played for their Under-19 side in the 2016 Under-19 Provincial Championship and their Under-21 side in the 2017 Under-21 Provincial Championship, and also played Varsity Cup rugby for UFS Shimlas.

He made his first class debut in 2017, coming on as a replacement for the Free State XV in their Rugby Challenge match against former side Griquas. He made four appearances in that competition, and featured in all ten of their matches in the 2018 edition of the competition, as the team reached the semifinal of the competition before losing to Griquas.

Venter was included in the Cheetahs squad for the 2018–19 Pro14 competition, and made his debut in their final match of the season against the Southern Kings. Venter came on as a replacement in the 73rd minute of the match, and scored his side's final try in a 61–25 victory.

In December 2025, it was confirmed that Venter had signed a three-year deal to join the Lions, commencing on 1 July 2026.

== Honours ==
South Africa

- 2025 Rugby Championship winner

== Statistics ==
=== Test match record ===
As of 8 August 2026

Opponent	P	W	D	L	Try	Pts	%Won
Argentina	2	2	0	0	0	0	100
Australia	2	1	0	1	0	0	50
France	1	1	0	0	0	0	100
Georgia	1	1	0	0	1	5	100
Ireland	1	1	0	0	0	0	100
Italy	1	1	0	0	0	0	100
New Zealand	1	0	0	1	0	0	0
Scotland	1	1	0	0	0	0	100
Total	10	8	0	2	1	5	80

=== International tries ===
As of 15 September 2025

Try	Opposing team	Location	Venue	Competition	Date	Result	Score
1	Georgia	Mbombela, South Africa	Mbombela Stadium	2025 mid-year test	19 July 2025	Win	55–10
