= Morgan Naudé =

South African rugby union player

- Born: 11 August 1998 (age 28)
- Height: 1.79 m (5 ft 10 1/2 in)
- Weight: 108 kg (238 lb; 17 st 0 lb)
- School: Hoërskool Nelspruit

Rugby union career
- Position: Prop
- Current team: Lions / Golden Lions
Youth career
- 2016–2019: Pumas
Senior career
Years	Team	Apps	(Points)
2018–2021	Pumas	21	(5)
2021–	Lions	39	(5)
2022–	Golden Lions	22	(10)
- Correct as of 26 October 2026

Morgan Naudé (born 11 August 1998) is a South African rugby union player for the Pumas in the Currie Cup and the Rugby Challenge. His regular position is prop.
