= Ngoni Chidoma =

Zimbabwean-South African rugby union footballer

- Full name: Ngonidzashe Chidoma
- Born: 2 December 1996 (age 29) Harare, Zimbabwe
- Height: 1.84 m (6 ft 1/2 in)
- Weight: 117 kg (258 lb)
- School: Northwood

Rugby union career
- Position: Prop
- Current team: Pumas
Senior career
Years	Team	Apps	(Points)
2017	Sharks XV	1	(0)
2019–present	Pumas	4	(0)
- Correct as of 8 September 2019
International career
Years	Team	Apps	(Points)
2014	South Africa Schools	2	(0)

Ngonidzashe Chidoma (born 2 December 1996) is a Zimbabwean-born South African rugby union player for the Pumas in the Currie Cup and the Rugby Challenge. His regular position is prop.

He made his Currie Cup debut for the Pumas in July 2019, coming on as a prop replacement in their final match of the 2019 season against the Free State Cheetahs.
