= Bunyore =

Place in the Vihiga County of Kenya

Bunyore is a locality in the Vihiga County in the western province of Kenya. It is largely inhabited by Luhya, who speak the OLunyole dialect of the Luhya language. In the local language, the place is known as Ebunyore and its people as the Abanyore (the descendants of Anyore). It is divided into eight locations namely Central Bunyore, West Bunyore, South Bunyore, South-West Bunyore, East Bunyore, North Bunyore, North East Bunyore, and Wekhomo. Prior to 1990, Bunyore was under Kakamega District, divided into East and West Bunyore locations. As population increased, the former West Bunyore was split into Central, West, South and South West locations while the former East Bunyore was split into North, North East, Wekhomo and East Bunyore locations in order to better serve the people.

Bunyore is home to the national headquarters of the Church of God in Kenya, Bunyore Girls’ High School and Kima School of Theology all of which are located at Kima. A significant town in Bunyore is Luanda, Kenya, located on the Kisumu-Busia Highway. Maseno University, in the neighboring Maseno town, is less than 6 miles from Kima.

== Administrative locations ==
Central Bunyore Location:

1. Ebukanga Sublocation - includes, Ebukobelo, Ebung'anga, A'ananda, Emmatse, Essunza, Isanda and Munjiti.

2. Embali Sublocation - includes Ebuyangu, Ebuyalu, Esikhuyu, Emmabwi, Musanda and Mundika.

3. Ebutongoi Sublocation - includes Emusire, Emanyinya, Ebutongoi-Ebukanga, Emmuchula, Esirulo, Essaba, and Mwichio.

West Bunyore Location:

1. Ebusiekwe Sublocation - includes Esibila, Ipali, Itumbu, Esumba, Duka Moja, Mwichekhe and Emmukolla

2. Ebusiralo Sublocation - includes Ebusiralo, Ekamanji and Ematenje

3. Ebusikhale Sublocation - includes Epang’a, Mumboha, Emmayoka, and Ebusokho.

South Bunyore Location:

1. Ebwiranyi Sublocation

2. Ekwanda Sublocation

3. Ebusakami Sublocation - includes Essabalu,

South West Bunyore Location:

1. Ebutanyi Sublocation - includes Emmukusa

2. Esiandumba Sublocation - includes Emmuli Emaloba and Ebwiranyi.

3. Mwitubwi Sublocation - includes Ebusubi, and Ekatieno.

North Bunyore Location:

1. Ebulonga Sublocation -

2. Emakunda Sublocation - includes Ebusiubi and Emmukunzi.

3. Ebusiratsi Sublocation - includes Emastuli, Eluhobe, Elukongo, Ebukhuliti and Ebukhubi

North East Bunyore -includes Ebusamia Location and Ebunangwe Locations.

1. Ebunangwe Location; Ebusiloli sub location, Eb........

2. Ebusamia Location - (not to be confused with Samia),

  Esibuye sub location, Emuhondo\Ebukhunza Sublocation and Emusutswi sub location

East Bunyore Location:

1. Eb’bayi Sublocation -

2. Esianda Sublocation -

3. Emutsalwa Sublocation -

Wekhomo Location:

1. Ebuusundi Sublocation -

2. Iboona Sublocation - includes Emmutete and Emuhaya

== Geography ==
Bunyore is located approximately between 0.083 latitude and 34.617 longitude. Two main rivers and about four smaller seasonal streams run through the area. The two main rivers are river Yala and Esalwa. Ejorodani (Jordan) is a tributary of river Yala and Etsava (pronounced E'chaaba in Lunyore and Edzava in Maragoli) is a tributary of Esalwa. River Yala runs through Bunyore from Nandi hills and Maragoli into Gem in Siaya. There are numerous hills and valleys in Bunyore characterized by huge granite stones. Some of the stones are as tall as 15 meters high and cover an eighth of a mile. The tallest hills, Ebuhando hills, border Maragoli to the west and are adjacent to Maseno Mission Hospital. From these hills one can well see as far as Lake Victoria and most parts of Kisumu town. Other high hills in the region include Emmutete Khusikulu, Ebusiekwe hills, Ebutongoi Khusikulu and Musikulu Ha-Buchichi. Huge granite rocks are scattered in Bunyore with a significant one located at Ekhakamba in Ebuyangu on the Buyangu-Ebukanga road.

== Climate ==
Bunyore has an equatorial climate with fairly well distributed rainfall throughout the year. The precipitation ranges between 1750mm and 2000mm, with peaks in March to June and October to November. Temperatures range is between 14 °C and 32 °C with a mean temperature of 23 °C. The climate is well suited for agricultural activities.

== Farmers' markets ==
Most sublocations in Bunyore hold a farmers' market at least once or twice a week. The Leading market is Luanda Market. Other markets are Ipali Market, Mwibona Market, Magada (Emakata) Market, Wemilabi Market, Kima Market, Ilungu Market, Esibuye Market, Mwichio Market, Mwituha/Makakha Market, Mukhalakhala Market, Emahanga Market, Mudepo (Maseno Halt Depot) market, Esirulo Market, Eshibinga Market, Emanyinya Market, Mwitsukhi Market, Essaba Market, Emmatse Market, Ebukolo Market, Milimani (Echichibulu) Market, Ilungu Market and Emmaloba Market.

== Infrastructure ==
Four major roads serve Bunyore besides, the train line that runs from Nairobi to Butere through Luanda and Yala. The Kisumu-Busia highway runs from Kisumu to Busia. It traverses Bunyore through Maseno, Luanda and Mmailo continuing towards Ebuyangu and Yala. A second road the Ebusakami-Kima route serves travellers from Ebusakami junction to Kima Mission Hospital. The third road runs through Khusikulu, Mwilonje Esibuye, Emmang'ali Emusutswi towards Vihiga District. The smallest of the four major roads is the Luanda-Mulwakhi-Emusire- road which runs from Ebusikhale through, Es'saba, Ha-Buchichi, Mwichio and Emusire to Esirulo. Other minor seasonal roads are:

- Luanda-Epanga-Khusikulu-(Wemilabi)-Emakata road.
- Ekwanda-Ebwiranyi-Luanda road.
- Kima-Emabungo road.
- Ebwali-Essongolo road.
- Emusire-Ebukanga-Ebuyangu road.
- Emusire-Emanyinya-Fort Jesus road.
- Wemilabi-Ebukhaya-Mundichiri-Emmukunzi-Ematsuli road.
- Luanda-Esiandumba-Akala road.

Airports near Bunyore include Kisumu Airport, located at Kisumu 30 km away, Eldoret International Airport, located at Eldoret, 153 km away, Busia Airstrip, located at Busia, 60 km away and Kakamega Airstrip, located at Kakamega, 60 km away.

== Religion ==
The majority of Abanyole are Christians. In the early 1900s the African Compound and Interior Mission (ACIM), having established itself in South Africa, began seeking expansion opportunities into the African Great Lakes region. A missionary by the name Baker, was sent from South Africa to explore mission opportunities in the African Great Lakes. His expedition led to Bunyore in the Nyanza Province—modern day Western Province—of Kenya where he found and annexed a suitable large parcel of land (Kima, Bunyore where the missionaries were to set up church in circa A.D. 1905.), and a welcoming pious native population amenable to Christianity, and hankering for edification opportunities. Baker returned to South Africa and another missionary, Robert Wilson together with his wife, was sent to begin work in the area. Whereas, their work flourished, the parent ministry in South Africa lacked pertinent resources to sustain its African Great Lakes mission. Consequently, the ACIM was compelled to cede its African Great Lakes mission to the auspices of the United States of America-based Church of God, headquartered at Anderson in the State of Indiana.

The Church of God established itself as the major denomination amongst the people of Bunyore. However, the dominance of the Church of God in Bunyore came to an end in 1924; when Bunyore became the pillar of strength of the Anglican Church. The reversal of the Church of God's dominance in Bunyore was in consequence of the wedding of Esau Khamati Oriedo and Evangeline Ohana Olukhanya Analo-Oriedo, which took place on 29 September 1923 in the Church of God Mission church at Kima. The couple's Christian wedding ceremony was proceeded with a traditional African reception; an act that was utterly unacceptable to the Church of God missionary, Rev. H. C. Kramer (the wedding officiant) who closed the church and demanded an act of contrition. Rather than acquiesce, the newlywed couple persuaded other members to resign from the Church of God; and with blessings of the Anglican Archdeacon Owen went on to become the founder of Ebwali St. John Anglican church (The evolution of the three modern era Maseno Dioceses of the Anglican Church of Kenya). Consequently, the Nyanza province—once the stronghold of the Church of God and outside the Anglican influence—became a pillar of Anglican strength.

Other denominations such as the Roman Catholic churches, Full Gospel Church, Dini ya Israeli, Pentecostal church exist among the population. Many people of Bunyore exercise some form of commingling of Christianity and traditional Abanyole spiritual tenets.

== Notable persons of Bunyore origin ==
1. Kenneth Marende, former Speaker of the National Assembly.
2. Wilber Otichilo, former MP of Emuhaya Constituency and currently the Governor of Vihiga county since August, 2017.
3. Blasio Vincent Ndale Esau Oriedo (July 1931 - 26 January 1966), Laureate and Pioneering Parasitological Epidemiologist in the Study, Control, and Eradication of Infectious and Tropical Diseases in Africa. (Note: He was a confidant of Thomas Joseph Odhiambo Mboya (died 1969). Dr. Blasio Vincent Ndale Oriedo played a pivotal role, including teaming up with his longtime friend and confidant Tom Mboya, to effectuate learning opportunities abroad—beyond Europe, specifically in North America—for young African men and women in the African Great Lakes region needing higher education, in what he cognized as an implementation of a vital intellectual infrastructure in the emerging young Great Lakes democracies; most notable is the Airlift African program sponsored by the African-American Students Foundation in United States whereby between 1959 through 1963 800 African Great Lakes students (including Barack Obama Sr., future father of the 44th U.S. president & the first African-American to hold the office) were transported to study at the U.S. and Canadian colleges and universities.)
4. Esau Khamati Oriedo (circa 1888 - 1 Dec. 1992), a politician in colonial-era Kenya
5. Festo Olang' (1914-2004), First African Archbishop of the Anglican Church of Kenya
6. Ruth Habwe (died 1996), Kenyan feminist activist and politician. (Note: In 1964 she became notably, a first among women to challenge a male only parliamentarian system, when she contested one of the three special parliamentary seats vacant at the time, she was suspended from party membership for daring to contest the seat and ridiculed "to go back to the Kitchen and cook for Habwe's children".)
7. Eric Edward Khasakhala (1926–2000), former MP of Emuhaya & Cabinet Minister.
8. [(Wilson Mukuna)] (deceased), former MP for Emuhaya
9. Reuben J. Olembo (1937-2005), academic, geneticist, environmentalist. Former Deputy Executive Director of UNEP, former UN Assistant Secretary General.
10. [(Shem Chimoto)] (deceased), former Captain, Kenya National Football Team and Abaluhya Football Club.
11. John Nyawanga, former Captain, Kenya National Football Team during 1972 AFCON Finals, Abaluhya Football Club.
12. [(Gerry Ebole)], (deceased), former National Hockey team and Sikh Union player.
13. Kakai Kissinger, human rights lawyer and activist.
14. Gloria Muliro, Gospel Singer
15. [Basett Buyukah], veteran journalist and media personality.
16. [John Kabaka, aka Fabisch], Renowned journalist and media guru, Mcee, Football coach
17. Mary Akatsa, Pentecostal minister
