= Esau Khamati Oriedo =

Kenyan civic leader and evangelist (1888–1992)

Esau Khamati Sambayi Oriedo
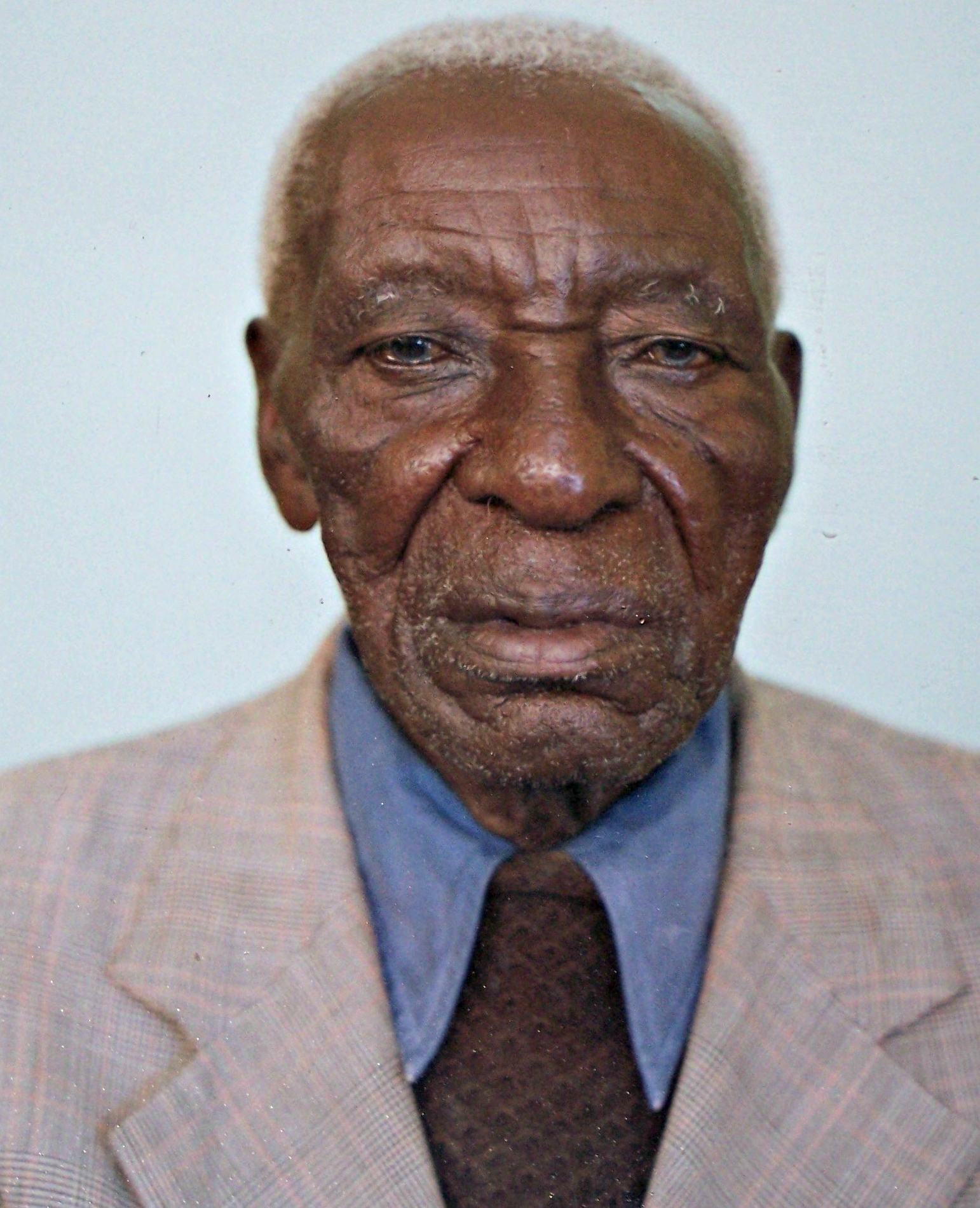
- Esau Khamati Oriedo 1990 Nairobi, Kenya

Personal details
- Born: Esau Khamati Sambayi; 29 January 1888 Ebwali Village, Bunyore, North Kavirondo in the East African colonial territory governed by the Imperial British East Africa Company
- Died: 1 December 1992 (aged 104) Iboona Village at Bunyore, Kenya
- Spouse: Evangeline Olukhanya Ohana Analo-Oriedo (d. 11 July 1982)
- Children: 10 children: Ten children – Seven survived into adulthood: Diane Trufosa Ongoche Nyabul (d. 1977) Dr. Blasio Vincent Oriedo (d. 1966) Dorcas Ayieta Anambo (d. 2002) Norman S. Oriedo Dr. Micah Atsiaya Oriedo Malik Kenbellah Oriedo Judith Ayoma Ong'ayo Shiraku
- Military career
- Spouse: Evangeline Olukhanya Ohana Analo-Oriedo (d. 11 July 1982)
- Allegiance: United Kingdom
- Branch: British Army British Army's King's African Rifles (KAR)
- Service years: 1914–1918 and 1939–1946
- Rank: Frontline Infantryman
- Units: World War I: 1st King's African Rifles; World War II: 11th (East Africa) Division KAR
- Conflicts: World War I World War II – Burma Campaign
- Memorials: War (WWI & WWII) monuments commemorating Kenyan KAR Soldiers on Kenyatta Avenue at Nairobi, Kenya
- 1. 1928 – District Representative; District House Assembly, Local Native Council (LNC) of North Nyanza – Kenya Colony; 2. Twice chairman of North Nyanza LNC; 3. 1963 – 1970 Councilor Emuhaya Constituency Kakamega District County Council, Republic of Kenya

Esau Khamati Sambayi Oriedo (29 January 1888 – 1 December 1992) was a Kenyan Christian evangelist, a philanthropist, an entrepreneur and a trade unionist, a veteran of World War I and World War II as a soldier in the King's African Rifles (KAR), a barrister, and an anti-colonialism activist. In 1923 he singlehandedly altered the Christian church landscape in Bunyore and the rest of North Nyanza region—in the present-day western and Nyanza regions of Kenya. He was an indomitable adept all-around crusader for a myriad of polygonal causes—the rights of the aboriginal peoples, a stalwart advocate for the syncretism of Christianity and traditional African cultural moralities, and a literacy champion—in the British East African Protectorate & Colony of Kenya, during the period that span more than five decades (1910s – 1960s) of the colonial and postcolonial epoch.

In 1952 – 1957 he was detained at Kapenguria together with Mzee Jomo Kenyatta and other fellow Kenyan freedom fighters reminiscent of Chief Koinange Wa Mbiyu (d. 1960) by the British colonial government in Kenya, under the so-called emergency rule. Besides, he endured unadulterated torture, denied legal representation and visitation by his family and confrères; and he bore the arrogation of all his business enterprises, financial, and real-estate property, confiscated as a penal measure by the colonial authorities. In the early 1930s Esau Oriedo and Jeremiah Othuoni (1898 – c. 1958) of Enyaita successfully, through forceful civil disobedience, advocated for the chieftainship of Bunyore; in what was one of the earliest successful self-determination local movement uprising directed principally against the provincial colonial government in British East Africa. Before that, Bunyore was still under the jurisdiction of the Paramount Chief, Nabongo Mumia of Wanga (d. 1949). Mumia had in 1926 been appointed, by the British colonial government, paramount chief of all four traditionally aligned districts of western Kenya; which included the people of Bunyore. He was one of the first two council members from Bunyore to serve as a district representative in the colonial era District House Assembly known as the Local Native Council (LNC) of North Nyanza; one of the 26 countrywide local native legislative units enacted by the colonial government in 1924. Additionally, serving a tenure as the council's chairperson. His aptly articulative adept championing of secular education led to the North Nyanza LNC secular education initiative that gave rise to the founding of the Government African School Kakamega, present-day Kakamega High School; the first secular secondary school and the impetus of the modern-day public education system in Kenya. Esau Oriedo went on to be elected to multiple terms as a councilman in the County Council of Kakamega in the nascent post-colonial Kenya, before voluntarily stepping down to pave way for the younger generation, whom he continued to coach and mentor. In 1964 he successfully spearheaded the election to the national parliament of Edward Eric Khasakhala, the first member of parliament (MP) from Bunyore.

As a stalwart Christian crusader, Esau Oriedo is accredited among the native Africans whose contribution facilitated the growth and the headway of the modern Christian church into the interior of the African continent, dating 1450 – 1950. He and Chief Otieno wa Andale of Bunyore were principal aborigines ascribed with the successful growth of the Church of God Kima Mission—in its post 1904 infancy. He adeptly teamed up with Daniel Asiachi, on a project sanctioned by the American Bible Society and with the guidance of Dr. Gertrude B. Kramer, in the first ever translation of the Bible—New Testament, Psalms, and Proverbs—into the Nyole language. His resolute crusading for the syncretism of Christianity and the native African values prompted him, in 1923, to forsake the Church of God Kima Mission. In 1924, Esau Oriedo with the full backing of the Archdeacon of Uganda and Kavirondo, W. E. Owen, went on to found the St. John's Anglican Church at Ebwali village in Bunyore under the auspices of the Church Mission Society. This brought an end to the Church of God's dominance in Bunyore; thusly, Bunyore became, to this day, the pillar of strength of the Anglican Church.

Esau Oriedo was an ardent pan-ethnic philanthropist and a literacy advocate who awarded a multitude of pan-ethnic bursaries to aboriginal students from underprivileged communities and families who could not afford to pay fees to attend school. Recipients included politician Tom Mboya (d. 1969) and other notable Kenyans. The auspiciousness of his bursaries promoted him to successfully lobby the implementation of the North Nyanza LNC Scholarship Fund. The archetypical recipient of the North Nyanza LNC scholarships was Arthur Okwemba; a cerebrally brilliant young man who went to study medicine at Makerere Medical School. Mr. Okwemba personified one of the first cadre of the 15 percent of Makerere’ students who came from entirely illiterate and humble origins.

== Biography ==
=== Early life ===
Esau Khamati Oriedo (also known as “EK” or “Mzee Esau”) was born circa 1888 at Ebwali village in the precolonial modern-day Republic of Kenyan, at a time when the coastal regions of the country were administered by the Imperial British East Africa Company, the forerunner to the East Africa Protectorate. He was of the ethnic Bantu Kavirondo Luhya people of the present-day Bunyore. His father was one of the elders who made up the clan's collegial system of baraza (Note: Baraza is Kiswahili for council, assembly or meeting of the elders of a tribe.)—the Nyore or Nyole people were a gerontocratic acephalous society with a representative system of governance and collegial leadership structure composed of mainly a council of elders. He was the eldest of the four siblings, three brothers and one sister. Esau Oriedo had a difficult childhood and had to overcome monumental adversities. He lost his father early in life and had to craft his way through life as an orphan to become a self-made man who was respected by his peers and revered by his country. Moreover, he survived the variola major infirmity; a deadly strain of the smallpox disease that left him with long-term severe scarring on the face.

As an orphan, without any means of support, he left his native birthplace and travelled far in search of employment to support his three younger siblings. He secured employment as a “shamba boy” on a plantation annexed by a European settler. Despite the harsh work conditions and paltry pay, he worked diligently with pride, and performed commendably to the delight of his European employer, who also recognized his cerebral abilities; thus, promoting him to a domestic servant and later a cook. He became culinary expert—gourmet chef. He used his entire salary to support his three siblings; successfully ensuring his younger siblings did not subsist in a desolate plight of orphaned existence—in addition to providing for their needs, he made sure that his siblings received education beyond the rudimentary literateness. He acquired farmland for each of his brothers. He pointed to this period of his life, as humbling.

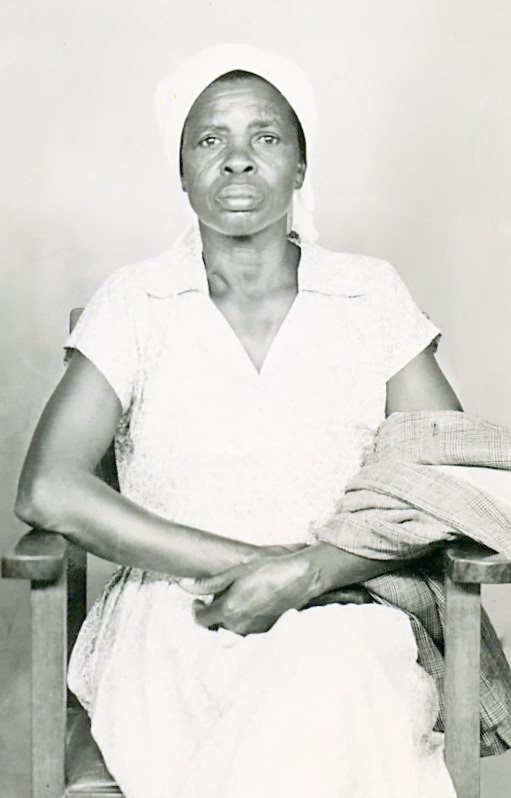
Evangeline Olukhanya Ohana Analo-Oriedo, wife of Esau Khamati Oriedo, 1952 at Nairobi, Kenya Colony. Photograph taken while she was in Nairobi lobbying for her husband, Esau Oriedo, and other anti-colonial activist to be released from detention by the British colonial government. She helped to organize a support group for women whose husbands had been detained for their activism against colonialism Kenya.

=== Family ===
Esau Khamati Oriedo married Evangeline Olukhanya Ohana (née Analo) on 29 September 1923; the daughter of Analo and Omina, members of the Bantu Luhya ethnicity. The wedding was transformative, and caused unmitigated controversy; it synergized the Christian matrimonial covenant with a traditional African reception. The couple Christian ceremony was held at the Church of God Kima Mission; it was officiated by the Reverend H. C. Kramer who was the head missionary at the mission owned by the Church of God at Anderson at the State of Indiana in United States of America. The matrimonial church ceremony was preceded by a traditional African Luhya reception at Ebwali village in Bunyore. Theirs was a first of its kind to be held at the Church of God Kima Mission at Kima in Bunyore. The wedding generated unmitigated controversy—spearheaded by the Rev. Kramer and the Church of God's Missionary Board Office at Anderson, Indian in United States of America—whose outcome changed the trajectory of the Christian landscape across the Kavirondo region, the modern-day Nyanza and western regions of the Republic of Kenya.

The couple met at the mission where he was serving as a deacon, community liaison, and clerk; whereas, Evangeline Analo was a student at the mission's quasi-seminary for girls, a forerunner to Bunyore Girls’ High School, where she was concurrently studying Christian theology, and home economics educator—she was among a handful of young native African women chosen by the mission for grooming as future bible study intermediaries and home economics instructors amongst indigenous population.

They had ten children – Seven survived into adulthood: Diane Trufosa Ongoche Nyabul (d. 1977); Dr. Blasio Vincent Oriedo (d. 1966); Dorcas Ayieta Anambo (d. 2002); Norman S. Oriedo; Dr. Micah Atsiaya Oriedo; Malik Kenbellah Oriedo; and Judith Ayoma Ong'ayo Shiraku. He made sure that his surviving children received higher education. In general, he had a complicated relationship with his children; in part due to cultural factors, and his life experiences—such as, the carnage of two world wars which he experienced as a soldier—and a plethora of causes which he ardently championed (A sacrifice for his country that left him with little or no time for his children.). Albeit a compassionate figure, he utterly refrained from expressing what he considered undue affection towards his children. Antecedently, he often received his children's successes without showing undue excitement. The relationship with his eldest son, Dr. Blasio Vincent Ndale Oriedo, was estranged; however, Blasio' death in 1966, under inexplicable circumstances, left him heartbroken.

In all, he taught his children to strive for their highest possible potential, to be humble and successful, and altruistic. Moreover, he wanted his children to have adequate self-sustaining means of contented existence; to be actively engaged in the affairs of their country; to be inquisitive; to embrace holistic inclusiveness and altruism; and to be good Christians—to adopt their traditional African heritage in syncretism with the Christian faith. Indeed, the embrace of these core values which he endeared are embodied in the altruism and embrace of social causes pursued by his two children, Dr. Blasio Vincent Oriedo (d. 1966) and Dr. Micah Astiaya Oriedo.

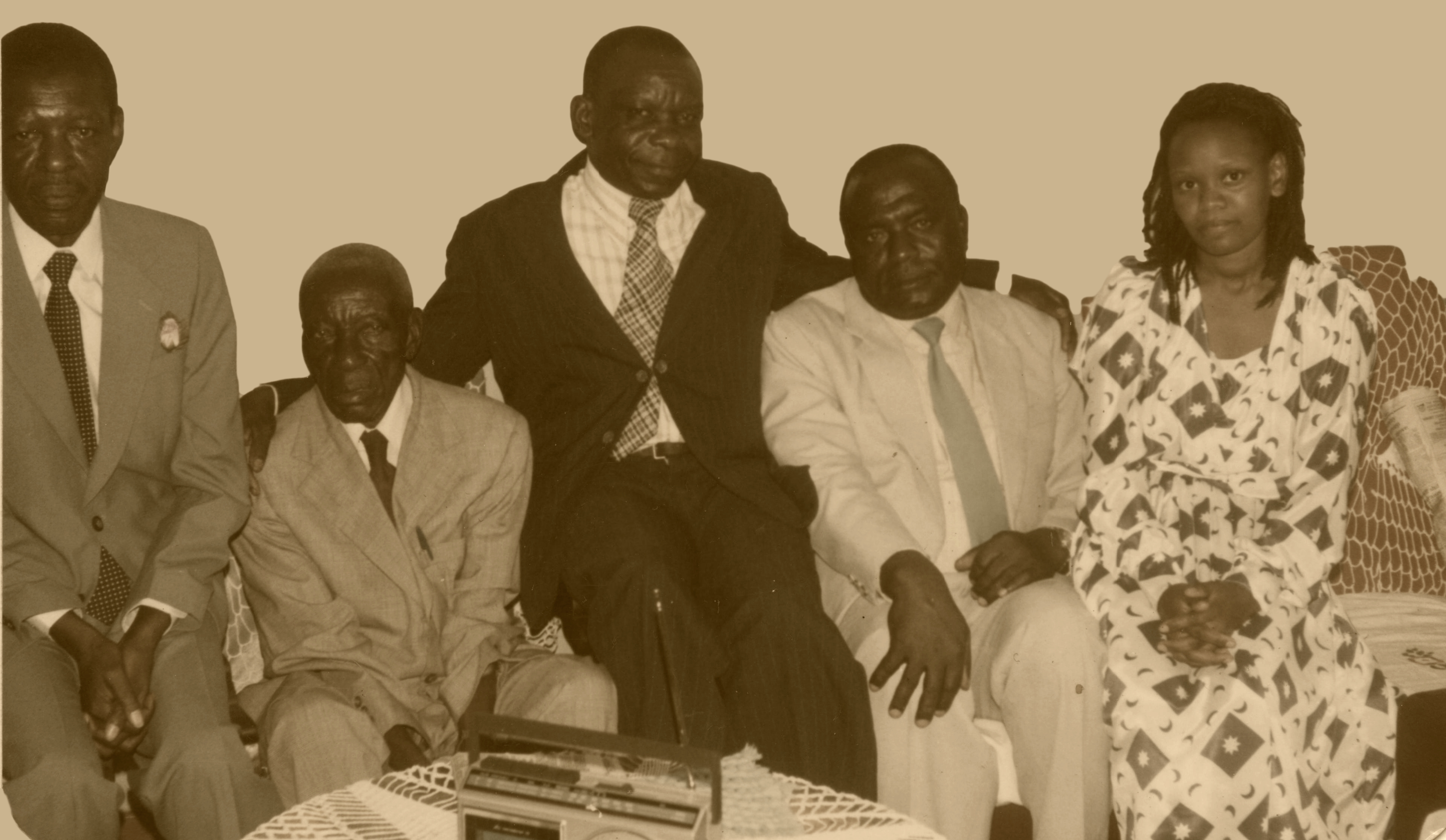
Hon. Esau Khamati Oriedo (second left) with family and friends at Nairobi circa 1971.

His wife, Evangeline Ohana Olukhanya Oriedo, was an esteemed pioneering and ardent champion of women's rights. She helped lay the groundwork for what later, in 1952, became known as Maendeleo Ya Wanawake Organisation, a national Non-Governmental Organization for advancement of women causes in Kenya. (Note: Ill-advisedly, Maendeleo Ya Wanawake Organisation was reduced into a women’s political organ of the Kenya African National Union (KANU) political party—a KANU marionette—during the nearly 40 years (after Kenya's Independence in 1963) of political supremacy by KANU in a de facto and the then de jure one-party state Kenya.) She was a role model to many eminent Kenyan women and personalities. Most notably is her mentor and counsel of Ruth Habwe (d. 1996), in Mrs. Habwe's 1964, pioneering, as the first woman in the post-colonial Kenya to challenge a male only parliamentarian system, when she contested one of the three special parliamentary seats vacant at the time. (Note: The one party and male only parliamentarian system responded malevolently by suspending Mrs. Habwe from party membership for daring to contest the seat and ridiculed her "to go back to the Kitchen and cook for Habwe's children". Promoting Evangeline alongside other women to spearhead a successful petition campaign prevailing upon women to abrogate party membership and all domestic chores until Mrs. Habwe’s party membership was restored unconditionally with a parliamentary expression of regret.) She helped to organize a support group for women whose husbands had been detained for their activism against colonialism Kenya. Evangeline was among the first native Africans from the Maseno diocese to be admitted to the mothers’ union organisation of the Anglican Church, she became the leader of the Maseno diocese branch. She used as effective infrastructure to teach scripture and home economics her native population of Bunyore. The mothers’ union organisation was started in Kenya by European Kenyan Women in 1918.

=== Education ===
Esau Oriedo was an autodidact wholly self-taught and a multilingual polyglot who also expanded his knowledge by way of functional learning. His avid quest for knowledge and inquisitiveness were exemplary; in his early youth, he obtained unfettered access to the well-stocked family library of his Briton employer who was impressed with the young employee's cerebral acumen, eagerness to learn, and overall inquisitiveness. He made full use of his employer's vast library of books to teach himself how to read and write, proficiently. He became an eloquent writer, a judiciously gnostic reader, and a fluent conversant of the English language, in addition to Kiswahili, his mother-tongue, and a plethora of other languages. This self-education investment yielded significant developmental benefits which his employer made use of as a conduit to effectively manage his aboriginal African staff; vis-à-viz boosting productivity and economic benefits farming enterprise. He used his newly acquired skill steeped in the bible to the extent of becoming an avid bibliophile and astute scholar of history of Christianity, which further boosted his learnedness. He was studiously fascinated with theological comparative grasp of the similarities and contrasts between Christianity and traditional African cultures, and religious practices of other cultures; a quest that led to his exhaustive study of the bible and other related literary works. Esau Oriedo's scholarly interests encompassed the British and the American judicature of acts, particularly civil rights and business laws, in which he also became steeped. Antecedently, owing to these self-learning initiatives he became a presciently astute scholar of the British jurisprudence and the Crown regulations. Later, because of his intellectual and functional knowledge, together with multilingualism he was formally certified as a judicial clerk and interpreter within the British East Africa colonial legal system. He was one of the first two native Africans chosen by the British judiciary to become a court interpreter to Kisumu court, one of the three judiciary centers in Kenya. During his tenure, Esau Oriedo became, through functional experience and learning, became further steeped in the British jurisprudence and the Crown regulations; presciently recognizing how the judiciary and Crown regulations could be adopted to stem the plight of the native peoples of the British Colony of Kenya.

He wrote extensively and spoke English and Kiswahili, his mother-tongue and the Bantu lingua franca. He also advocated literacy and higher education among the native African population.

Additionally, to the antecedent, he was a student of the British military strategies; a predilection acquired from military service during the WWI & WWII. The military training and experience was edifying and augmented his learnedness and leadership skills.

He exemplified himself in multi-faceted ways of life. He championed many human causes—interdisciplinary (socioeconomic & geopolitical) and across ethnicities in his native Kenya.

=== Politics ===
His functional political activism dates to the mid-second decade of the 20th century, when as a Christian he started raising concerns over the missionary church's wholesome anti-native African cultural values; at an era when the colonial Christian dogma decreed that a devout aboriginal Christian must be a pliant convert. Albeit a devout Christian, he challenged this colonial narrative as red herring drivel and antithetical to the Christian scripture. He was an aptly adept champion of secular education system; and as a member of the District House Assembly of North Kavirondo/Nyanza he led the North Nyanza LNC secular education initiative that effected the founding of the Government African School Kakamega, present-day Kakamega High School — the first secular secondary education schools in Kenya, and the impetus of the current public education system in the Republic of Kenya.

Esau Khamati Oriedo, along with John Adala, were the first Bunyore members of the District House Assembly known as the Local Native Council (LNC). The Local Native Councils were enacted in 1924 by the Native Authority Amendment Ordinance, No. 14 of 1924. A total of 26 native legislative units were created across the British Colony and Protectorate of Kenya. The statutory Presidents of the Local Native Councils were white colonial District Commissioners; while, membership to the LNC was determined partly by election and partly by nomination. The initial intent of enacting the Local Native Councils — by the colonial government — was not an empowerment of self-determination by the native peoples of colonial Kenya; nevertheless, by 1932, during Esau Oriedo's tenure, the Local Native Council of North Nyanza was making important decisions to steer her own course of action towards establishing important infrastructures to support African causes and initiatives; the equipping and empowering of aboriginal Africans. For instance, establishing secular higher education facilities, agricultural transformation in North Nyanza, economic system — commerce and industry, healthcare systems, roads, an inclusive sociopolitical process, etc. Notably, the Local Native Council of North Kavirondo/Nyanza had the largest colonial era budget of any of the 26 native legislative units in the British Colony and Protectorate of Kenya.

After the 1928 reelection to represent his district in the District House Assembly of North Kavirondo (the LNC of North Kavirondo), later known as the Local Native Council of North Nyanza, he served as the vice-chair of the council; he was later to serve two terms as chairman of the council. By 1932 during Esau Oriedo's tenure, the Local Native Council of North Nyanza was making important decisions to steer her own course of action towards establishing important infrastructures to support the Africans. Indeed, Esau Oriedo played an influential role in the architect of these transformational initiatives by the North Nyanza LNC. The North Nyanza LNC secular education initiative that gave impetus to the Government African School Kakamega, present-day Kakamega High School is the archetype of his successful prescience advocacy for the separation of the African educational system from the undue influence of religious dogma.

Esau Oriedo, the philanthropist and a literacy advocate, awarded bursaries to individuals from poor families who could not afford to pay fees to attend school. He encouraged the recipients of his bursaries to attend the LNC secular schools. These bursaries helped attract a plethora of bright students from poor homes to the secular education which soon led to the North Nyanza LNC government schools academically outperforming the parochial counterpart. Likewise, the North Nyanza LNC had its own scholarship program which he helped champion. (Note: The bursaries served multiple purposes: (1) universal access to education opportunities, regardless of ones’ socioeconomic background; (2) enhancing the academic quality of North Nyanza LNC government schools by attracting and retaining some of the cerebrally brightest students in the country; (3) stemming the adverse socioeconomic and sociocultural consequences of illiteracy on individuals or communities and the civil infrastructures; and (4) so forth.) The scholarship was mostly focused on higher education opportunities for talented students who could not afford to attend colleges such as Makerere Medical School at Mengo, present-day Uganda. The archetypical recipient of the North Nyanza LNC scholarships was Arthur Okwemba; a cerebrally brilliant young man who went to study medicine at Makerere Medical School. Mr. Okwemba personified the 15 percent of Makerere’ students who came from entirely illiterate and humble origins. Mr. Okwemba is an exemplification of Esau Oriedo's pioneering role in making both early and higher educational opportunity universally accessible for all students without regard to their origin or family societal status.

After Kenya attained her independence, in 1963, he was elected to represent Emuhaya electoral area as councilor in the County Council of Kakamega District, present-day Western Province. He served multiple terms as a councilor—an elected member of Kakamega County Council; County Councils were local political governing federations of the newly restructured country, the new Republic of Kenya.

Esau Khamati Oriedo was a pragmatically progressive and a dynamic political figure; a charismatic and transformational statesman who embraced change as opportunity to attain new frontiers in the sociopolitical and socioeconomic furtherance of the welfare of his native African people. He was quick to recognize the changing dynamics of the native African landscape, and contextualized the consequent inescapability of the new reality. Moreover, he presciently discerned that the traditional native sociopolitical and economic infrastructures were antiquated and demanded to evolve; elsewise, irreversible great peril would befall his people.

As a politician, he was a pragmatic and effective colonial era and early post-colonial era politician. He served as a colonial era district representative in the District House Assembly known as the Local Native Council (LNC) of North Nyanza; one of the 26 countrywide local native legislative units enacted by the colonial government in 1924. In addition to being a district representative, he also served as the council's chairperson.

He was a member of the Kenya African Union (KAU), a grassroots organiser and an events coordinator, recruited merchants and workers into the organisation. (Note: The KAU was founded in 1944 and was chartered with fighting for Kenya's autonomy via peaceable but stolid rebellion against colonial rule. The KAU was an offspring of the trade union movement in Kenya and a forerunner to the Kenya African National Union (KANU). Despite the organization's proscription in 1952 by the British colonial government, former KAU members and leaders led successful peaceful negotiations which resulted in Kenya's independence.) A battle-hardened soldier and a student of the British military strategies, he developed a profound appreciation for and understanding of nationhood—organizing the different native African populations in the British Colony and Protectorate of Kenya into a single nation by aggregating and embracing her diverse ethnicities; he saw how soldiers from different races and ethnicities, and other units fighting under the British banner were effectively organised toward achieving common military objectives. The enlightenment lay bare to him the fact that the European culture as embodied in their military strategies was akin to his own traditional African culture of a communal teamwork to attain a common purpose. He espoused the amalgamation of the native African cause(s) and nationalism, recognizing that these constituents were indissoluble—you could not advocate for one without the other.

He was an embodiment of the pan-ethnic African nationalistic struggle for Kenya's freedom from colonial and imperial rule. All aspects of colonialism or ethnocentric hegemony engendered abject bête noire from Esau Khamati. His altruistic valor, against all forms of injustices, was buttressed by an acumen of pragmatism in congruent with innate abilities of a tactician and strategist. He presciently cognized the alteration in the aboriginal lifestyle caused by the presence of foreign explorers and missionaries, and eventual colonization of his people was an irreversibility to which he and his people had to adapt to by founding a practicable neoteric pan-ethnic nation-state. He understood the fragile dynamics of such a contemporary pan-ethnic nation-state that consisted a collection of traditionally separate societies with customarily divergent cultural-dogmata living under a shared neoteric socioeconomic and political governance system. Thus, he presciently cautioned against counterintuitive ethnocentric hegemony that would lead to the establishment of an oligarchic nation-state of autochthonous vassals. Esau was, indeed, a vociferous critic of any act of tribalism, especially interethnic savage internecine exploits of tribal underpinnings that engendered divisiveness that undermined the pan-ethnic African nationalism struggle to end colonial rule.

As a polyglot lingua franca, he pivoted an en bloc mélange of Kenyan ethnicities in a grassroots edification and mobilization of support for the pan-ethnic African nationalism cause(s). Innately conversant with intra-ethnic and interethnic issues of importance to a trans-ethnic spectrum of fellow Kenyans, he was a respected conciliator. His compatriots in the fight for Kenya's independence transcended both tribal and societal stratum.

When Kenya acquired her independence in December 1963, he was elected to several terms as a councilman in the County Council of Kakamega; he voluntarily gave up his position — at the start of ‘70's — to the younger generation, whom he continued to mentor. County councils were important local governments of the new Republic of Kenya chartered with enormous responsibilities of developing and implementing infrastructure necessary to integrate vast and variedly diverse highly localized peoples and systems—geographical, cultural, socioeconomic, lingual, political and religious locales—into a unified republic that would represent the interests of her peoples.

In 1964 he successfully spearheaded the election to the national parliament of his apprentice, Edward Eric Khasakhala, the first member of parliament (MP) in Bunyore.

=== Faith ===
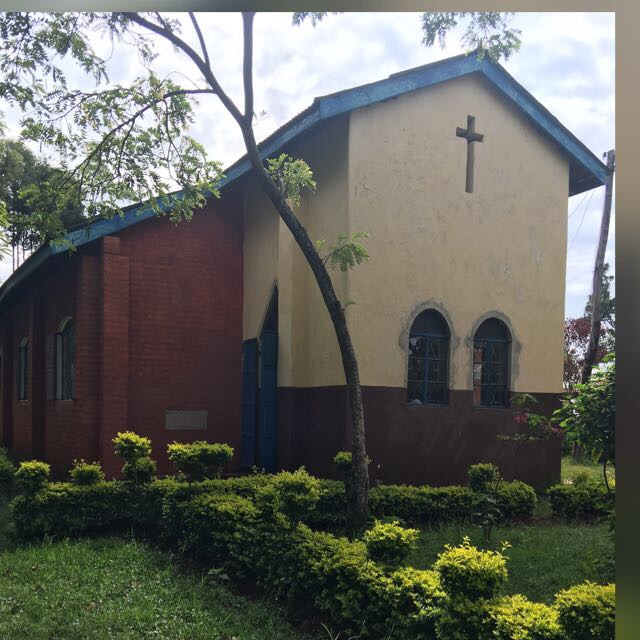
Ebwali St. John' Anglican Church at Bunyore, Kenya was founded by Esau Khamati Oriedo in 1923.

As a Christian crusader, a champion of religious (Christianity) tolerance and cultural inclusiveness, he challenged the colonial-era Christian church and missionaries in Kenya to embrace the traditional African heritage; he is credited among those Africans whose efforts effectuated successful amelioration and headway of the modern Christian church into Africa's interior, between 1450 — 1950; in 1923 he spearheaded the founding of St. John's Anglican Church at Ebwali village in Bunyore, Kenya to counter Church of God's dominance in Bunyore, after he forsook Church of God Anderson, Indiana, USA Kima Mission in 1923 because of its censoriously inimical stance towards the African culture—until then, he and Chief Otieno wa Ndale were key Africans in the establishment and growth of the Kima Mission; he had been a crucial African member and a principal stakeholder of the Kima mission. In 1954 he and his wife were presented with an ex post facto award for their outstanding contribution to the success of the Church of God, Kima mission; the award was conferred by the Kima Mission with the approval of International Missionary Board of Church of God at Anderson, Indiana in the USA.

In 1923 Esau Oriedo singlehandedly altered the Christian church landscape in Bunyore and the rest of North Nyanza. He was a devout Christian, albeit an ardent opponent of the antagonistic stance of the colonial Christian church missionaries and their overseas benefactors toward his native African culture. An embodiment of his embrace of this duality — i.e., a seamless integration of Christianity with the aboriginal African ethos — is contextualized by the events of his wedding in 1923 which blended a Christian holy sacrament of matrimonial covenant, which was celebrated at the Church of God Kima Mission, with a traditional African marriage reception, which took place at Ebwali village. The wedding reception triggered unmitigated controversy and condemnation from the Reverend H. C. Kramer — the head missionary at the Kima Mission who was the matrimonial service officiant — and the mission's home office in United States of America, Anderson, Indiana. Both Reverend Kramer and the mission's home office denounced the reception as sacrilegious, and demanded contrition by the couple. A disappointed Esau Khamati, the "inquisitor" and advocate of religious inclusiveness, regarded the demands for contrition as an act of religious servitude aimed at his African heritage; the very same heritage, he opined, that had been instrumental in the success of the Church of God mission in the region. He emphatically asserted that he and his wife were pious Christians, created by God in His own image of the familial African birthright; antecedently, he explicated that seeking contrition would be an act of sacrilege to his aboriginal African cultural heritage. Instead of acquiescing to the impious xenophobic stance of the colonial era Church of God establishment de jour, the newlywed couple persuaded fellow aboriginal African parishioners to embrace their heritage by abdicating the Church of God and founding their own Christian church affiliated with the Christian Missionary Society (CMS) that was considerably affable to the native African culturalism as embodied by the CMS Anglican Archdeacon Walter Edwin Owen with whom he had developed apt relationship purposed on core civil commonality initiatives.

In 1923 they founded the Ebwali St. John Anglican Church parish with the full blessings of the British Anglican Archdeacon Walter Edwin Owen; the Archdeacon Owen presided over the archdioceses of the Kavirondo region of the Kenya Colony and the British East African Protectorate of Uganda. He ceded land and other material resources to the nascent church and successfully implored the Archdeacon Owen to preside over the official founding ceremony in support of the nascent parish. The founding of the Ebwali Anglican Church parish by Esau Khamati became the impetus of the evolution of the three-modern era Maseno Dioceses of the Anglican Church of Kenya. Moreover, Esau Khamati not only forsook the Church of God, but he became an impassioned and effective crusader of the Christian Missionary Society. Consequently, in 1924 the dominance of the Church of God in Bunyore came to an end in 1924, when the region became the pillar of strength of the Anglican Church.

In 1954 Rev. Daudi Otieno of the Church of God Kima Mission and the Anderson, Indiana mission head office retrospectively venerated Mr. & Mrs. Esau Khamati Oriedo for their illustrious contribution to the Church of God Mission, Kima Bunyore Mission and their continued proselytizing of Christianity in Kenya — especially Bunyore and the rest of Nyanza province. Moreover, the Church of God, Anderson, Indiana and the Kima Mission officially acknowledged and registered the 1923 Esau Khamati Oriedo Christian marriage. This ex post facto acknowledgement, of Mr. and Mrs. Esau Khamati Oriedo's matrimony and stewardship to the church and Christianity, ushered in the beginning of a metamorphosis of the Church of God Mission' embrace of a more open attitude towards syncretism of the Christian doctrine with customary indigenous African values; thus, facilitating the effectiveness of the church's teachings.

Esau Khamati Oriedo and Daniel Asiachi made key contributions alongside Dr. Gertrude B. Kramer with the translation of the bible—vis-à-viz, the New Testament, Psalms, and Proverbs—into Lunyole (Lunyore); the native language of his Bantu Kavirondo people. The translation was sanctioned by the American Bible Society and spearheaded by Dr. Gertrude B. Kramer (the wife of Rev. Henry C. Kramer who was the head missionary at the Church of God Kima Mission during the 1920s). This was a monumental accomplishment; indeed, many natives contributed as well. In addition to coordinating the contributions from different aboriginal sources in Bunyore and elsewhere, Mr. Oriedo and Mr. Asiachi shouldered the main efforts of working directly with Dr. Kramer.

=== Activism ===
Indeed, at a time, during the colonial rule when there was fear and intimidation, here was a man who looked at every situation and listened to orders with skepticism. Finding no reason to “follow”, he questioned authority. This stance put him at odds with the imperial-colonial authorities. Nevertheless, despite being tortured and imperiled with rabid vituperative internment by the British colonial government, Esau Khamati the “Inquisitor”, remained steadfast to his ideals—he asked questions.

As a trade unionist, a legal advocate and scholar, he was one of the key members of the original trade-union movement in Kenya which advocated for fair wages, suitable employment conditions, and housing for African workers. During the Kakamega Gold Rush of 1930–52 he advocated for the unionisation of African mine workers as a non-violent effective approach to fight for their rights through collective bargaining initiatives; he implored the Local Native Council (LNC) of North Nyanza (Note: The Local Native Council (LNC) were colonial era District House Assembly; the local native legislative units enacted by the colonial government in 1924. The North Nyanza LNC, also known as the North Kavirondo LNC, comprised the present-day western region of Kenya. The North Nyanza LNC was one of the 26 local native legislative units that were countrywide.) to support the unionisation approach, but was unsuccessful. Nevertheless, he endeavoured to bring attention and awareness of sympathetic Britons to the plight of the native Africans. Colonial authorities deemed his actions to be sedition or rabblerousing and were posthaste outlawed.

Esau Oriedo's legal acumen, political prescience, and multilingualism made him a valuable resource to the early pan-ethnic and grassroots labor movement in colonial Kenya. The antecedent trade-union movement gave impetus to the 1944 founding of the Kenya African Union (KAU) political party which was banned in 1953 during the Mau Mau rebellion; the KAU eventually became the Kenya African National Union (KANU)—the party that formed the first African Government of Kenya at independence in 1963. He effectively leveraged his knowledge of the British Judicature of Acts to provide legal representation and advocacy to trade unions and its members, and other native African organizations being targeted for persecution by the colonial government as political subversives.

==== Freedom Fighter ====
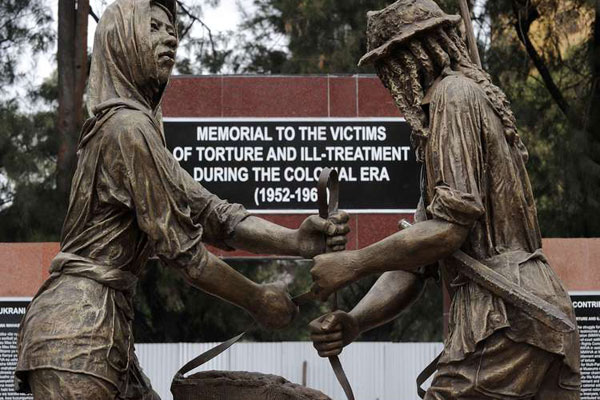
A memorial in honour of victims of torture in Kenya, including Esau Khamati Oriedo, during the British colonial era.

As a political activist and freedom fighter he actively advocated for the independence of the British Colony of Kenya in the struggle that was infamously named Mau Mau rebellion. For his role, he was detained, 1952 – 1957, at Kapenguria together with Mzee Jomo Kenyatta and fellow Kenyan freedom fighters reminiscent of Chief Koinange Wa Mbiyu (d. 1960). He developed a close relationship with the latter. While in detention, Esau Oriedo endured torture and the harshest conditions chastened by the British colonial government in Kenya, under the so-called emergency rule; he was denied legal representation and visitation by his family nor associates. Moreover, he bore the arrogation of all his business enterprises, financial, and real-estate property—confiscated as a penal measure by the colonial authorities. Albeit such abominable human rights bête noire sufferance, he never dithered.

As a freedom fighter, Esau Oriedo advocated for a pan-ethnic African nationalistic independent Kenya; he was at the fore of Kenya's struggle for her independence from the British colonial rule. His knowledge of the British Judicature of Acts and multilingualism acumen were vital factors for the freedom movement, especially in promoting a pan-ethnic African nationalistic independent Kenya. He campaigned for the release of Chief Koinange Wa Mbiyu whose failing health was of great concerns him; he urged the colonial government to release Chief Koinange Wa Mbiyu on medical grounds.

In 1946, Esau Khamati Oriedo—a pan-ethnic and KAU activist—was among the Bunyore leaders who hosted Jomo Kenyatta at the Maseno Depot in Bunyore, during Kenyatta's nationwide campaign imploring Kenyans to fight for independence. In 1946, Kenyatta had returned from England after years of self-exile in Great Britain. The campaign fueled the interest Bunyore people to join National parties in large numbers.

As a battle-hardened soldier, he honed his organizational & leadership skills which he effectively employed to bring together the diverse Kenyan ethnicities toward a common outcome of Kenyan's independence & the holistic rights of all her peoples. His service as a soldier in two world wars (WWI and WWII) in the King's African Rifles (KAR) made him battle-hardened student of the British military strategies; he developed a profound appreciation for and understanding of practicable and situational leadership, and the value of nationhood—organizing the different native African populations in the British Colony and Protectorate of Kenya into a single nation by aggregating and embracing her diverse ethnicities. He saw how soldiers from different races and ethnicities, and units fighting under the British banner were effectively leveraged in successfully attaining common military interests. The enlightenment lay bare to him that European culture as embodied in their military strategies was akin to his own traditional African culture of communalism teamwork to attain a common purpose.

His military training and experience buttressed his embrace and ardent championing of the pan-ethnic African nationalistic struggle for Kenya's freedom from colonial and imperial rule; and was resolutely antithetical to all facets of ethnocentric sociopolitical or economic hegemony, which he presciently understood to be internecine to the pan-ethnic African national freedom movement. His arbiter and polyglot skills came into play, severally, when he aided in the stemming internecine ethnic Luo-Kikuyu full-scale skirmishes in the 1950s.

==== Secular Education and Bursaries ====
Esau Oriedo was an ardent and articulate advocate of secular education. His aptly articulative adept championing of secular education led to the North Nyanza LNC secular education initiative that gave rise to the founding of the Government African School Kakamega, present-day Kakamega High School; the first secular secondary school and the impetus of the modern-day public education system in Kenya. He ceded his ancestral land to Ebwali Primary School to promote secular education infrastructure and the quality of education.

He was an advocate and promoter of literacy and higher education, which became his lifelong pursuit—as District Representative in Native Local Council of North Nyanza he spearheaded the creation of a secular schooling system to rival mission schools. Esau Oriedo, the philanthropist and a literacy advocate, awarded bursaries to individuals from poor families who could not afford to pay fees to attend school. The bursaries were pan-ethnic, and were awarded to a multitude of aboriginal students across ethnicities. Recipients included politician and activist Tom Mboya (d. 1969) and other key influencers in Kenyan's development during colonial and postcolonial eras. Albeit not focused on steering the recipients towards secular education in lieu of the mission schools he encouraged the recipients of his bursaries to attend the LNC secular schools. Albeit not focused on steering the recipients towards secular education in lieu of the mission schools; nevertheless, he encouraged the recipients of his bursaries to attend the LNC secular schools. These bursaries helped attract a plethora of intellectually bright students from poor homes to the secular education which soon led to the North Nyanza LNC government schools academically outperforming the parochial counterpart. Likewise, the North Nyanza LNC had its own scholarship program which he helped champion. The scholarship was mostly focused on higher education opportunities for talented students who could not afford to attend colleges such as Makerere Medical School at Mengo, present-day Uganda. The archetypical recipient of the North Nyanza LNC scholarships was Arthur Okwemba; a cerebrally brilliant young man who went study medicine at Makerere Medical School. Mr. Okwemba personified the 15 percent of Makerere’ students who came from entirely illiterate and humble origins. Mr. Okwemba is an exemplification of Esau Oriedo's pioneering role in making both early and higher educational opportunity universally accessible for all students without regard to their origin or family societal status.

==== The Kakamega Gold Rush of 1930-52 ====
As a member of the North Nyanza LNC, and during his tenure as the body's chairman, he joined with other Luhya (Kavirondo-Bantu) leaders and activists to advocate for the Luhya (Kavirondo-Bantu) land rights; especially, during the Kakamega Gold Rush of 1930–52. Together with the majority of North Nyanza LNC members, asserted that the North Nyanza LNC possessed the statutory rights to all gold revenues; furthermore, they reasoned, the native people of North Kavirondo district of Nyanza Province held absolute ownership of the land (with gold or without gold). Whereas, they maintained, the North Nyanza LNC was the primary body — under the Native Authority Amendment Ordinance, No. 14 of 1924—with decision-making statutory powers on land already declared as native land, under the colonial and imperial authorities’ strategy of restricting native populations to reservations that were thought to be worthless to colonial and imperial interests. Owing to Archdeacon Owen — he and his colleagues —protested the alienation by colonial and imperial authorities of land owned by the native people of Luhya (North Kavirondo) since the changing of fortunes — gold deposits. The Native Land Trust Amendment Ordinance of 1932 had once more, anew, denied the native people of Luhya (North Kavirondo) their alienable rights to their land, and the nullification of the already categorically inadequate statutory powers provided to them by the colonial and imperial authority in the form of the North Nyanza LNC established under the Native Authority Amendment Ordinance, No. 14 of 1924.

In the early 1930s [the onset of the Kakamega Gold Rush] – helped contextualise to Archdeacon Owen, who was a member of Committee on Native Land Tenure in North Kavirondo Reserve (1930), the omnipotent veneration Bantu Kavirondo people (Luhya people) embraced for land as a posterity that extended throughout an indefinite generational vision of natural lineage/heredity. This was in consequence to which, not only, was the colonial system of reservations troublesome to the Bantu Kavirondo people, but then again, to implement the flawed recommendations contained in the report by Committee on Native Land Tenure in North Kavirondo Reserve — which included fiscal policy provisions that mandated land registration and corresponding registration fees and other forms of levies — was futile; the Bantu Kavirondo people viewed such stipulation as a tyrannical subjugation whose implications inferred that their land — the land of their forefathers — was being claimed by the imperial and colonial authorities and their native cronies. An act which hoisted the imperial and colonial authorities and their native cronies to landlords; whereas, consigning the native Africans of North Kavirondo to a class of squatter or tenant denizens on their own lands, a feat that tradition obliged be met with perspicuous contemptuous resistance.

He also advocated for the African mine workers’ rights; he was an outspoken North Nyanza LNC member on the repugnant working conditions and exiguous rate of pay which the native African gold mine workers were subjected to, in addition to the unmitigated loss of reservation land—assumed worthless by the colonial and imperial authorities of the British Colony and Protectorate of Kenya—allotted them under the Native Land Trust Ordinance of 1924. He urged the North Nyanza LNC to support the unionization of African mine workers as a non-violent effective approach to fighting for their rights through collective bargaining. He endeavored to bring attention and awareness of sympathetic Britons to plight of the native Africans; the plight brought about by the Kakamega Gold Rush of 1930–52. His efforts faced insurmountable peril as the colonial and imperial authorities colluded with European miners, mining companies, and speculators in establishing statutory basis for maintaining bounteous mining workforce at exiguous rate of pay and abhorrent working conditions; consequently, Esau Oriedo's efforts were deemed by authorities as antigovernment sedition or rabble-rousing.

==== Trade Unionist ====
He was one of the key members of the original trade-union movement in Kenya which advocated for fair wages; employment conditions and housing for African workers. Trade-union movement was the catalytic impetus of the political movement; the Kenya African Union which later became Kenyan African National Union (KANU) is a direct descendant of trade-union movement in Kenya.

He was a colonial era trade union organiser. He took full advantage of trade unionising to band together with fellow activists so as to achieve common goals to effectively campaign for the socioeconomic and political empowerment of the natives people during colonialism era in Kenya. The effectiveness of trade unions as catalysts for socioeconomic and geopolitical transformation caused the colonial government to label trade unions and membership as unwholesome and dangerous agitators — political subversives — veiled as trade union organisations; consequently, the trade unions and its members, and such organisations became targets of persecution by the colonial government using judicially tools and the state of emergency rule and the general provisions of — of the so-called—seditious speeches and acts.

In the early 1930s he advocated for the unionisation of African mine workers as a non-violent effective approach to fighting for their rights through collective bargaining campaign, and implored the North Nyanza LNC to support the unionisation approach, but was unsuccessful. He argued that the unionisation approach by African mine workers was an effective non-violent approach of fighting for their rights through collective bargaining. He endeavoured, with help from Archdeacon Owen, to bring awareness, to the sympathetic Britons, the plight of the native Africans; the plight brought about by the Kakamega Gold Rush of 1930–52. His efforts and others akin to it were deemed by colonial authorities as antigovernment sedition or rabblerousing and were posthaste outlawed.

1930–52 [Kakamega Gold Rush] – He endeavoured tirelessly to bring attention and awareness of sympathetic Britons to plight of the native Africans; the plight brought about by the Kakamega Gold Rush of 1930–52.^{.}

He was a member of the multiethnic Kisumu Chamber of Commerce founded in 1927 by the Kavirondo Taxpayers Welfare Association (founded in 1923) under the leadership of Zablon Aduwo Nanyonje; and later in the 1930s was a founding member of North Kavirondo Chamber of Commerce to lobby for the growing number of African retail traders, including himself. Whereas, Kisumu Chamber of Commerce was multiethnic, the Kavirondo Taxpayers Welfare Association became dominated by Luo — Nilotic Kavirondo; hence, the offshoot in 1924 of North Kavirondo Taxpayers Association which drew membership from the Luhya — Bantu Kavirondo. Both Kavirondo and North Kavirondo Taxpayers Associations were initially products of chiefs and their patrons; but, Kisumu Chamber of Commerce and North Kavirondo Chamber of Commerce, respectively, excluded chiefs and their cohorts from membership. The chamber's mission was to end collision between colonial chiefs and Asian traders, and to oppose the anti-African economic activities regulations by colonial government marketing boards.

His role as an effective trade unionist made him and fellow trade-union members targets of persecution by the colonial government using judicially tools and the state of emergency rule and the general provisions of—of the so-called—seditious speeches and acts.

In 1964 he founded of Kenya Chamber of Commerce and Industry, Bunyore Branch (registered on 3 June 1964); a not-for-profit, non-governmental, member based organization chartered with promoting conducive and productive business environment, regulatory advocacy, community stewardship, literate local human resources, raw material and technology, and a creation of commerce and industry infrastructure able to attract sustainable business development to further socioeconomic welfare of all communities in Bunyore.

==== The Bunyore Chieftaincy ====
In the 1930s he successfully advocated for the chieftainship of Bunyore. Before that, Bunyore was still under the jurisdiction of the Paramount Chief, Nabongo Mumia of Wanga (d. 1949). Mumia had in 1926 been appointed, by the British colonial government, paramount chief of all four traditionally aligned districts of western Kenya; which of course, included the people of Bunyore — Esau Oriedo's Bantu ethnic Luhya group. Esau Khamati Oriedo and Jeremiah Othuoni, (1898 – c. 1958) of Enyaita, were political frontier activists whose gallantry activism through political defiance caused colonial leadership to make change in the way Bunyore was governed; change that brought about the Bunyore chieftaincy structure that was supported by the Nyore/Nyole community. Important to note that pre-European acephalous Nyore/Nyole of Bantu Kavirondo/Luhya, like other Bantu Kavirondo/Luhya, were a sovereign people; thus, the system of rule by the British colonial Government Officials supported by appointed chiefs in disregard of the traditional power structures engendered contemptuousness, which Kenyatta charismatically delineated among the Bantu Gikuyu people of central Kenya, and that which Esau Oriedo and Jeremiah Othuoni reproachfully resisted.

==== Fight for Syncretism and Religious Inclusiveness ====
The impetus of his struggle for the syncretism of Christianity and African values dates back to the late 1910s when he sought to integrate the duality of Africanism with Christianity, and the socioeconomic technological eminence of the Europeans. An embodiment of his embrace of this duality is his own wedding in 1923 which blended a Christian service at the Church of God Kima mission with a traditional African reception at Ebwali village. The church wedding was presided over by Reverend H. C. Kramer the head of Church of God Anderson, Indiana Kima Mission at Kima in Bunyore, Kenya which—to the chagrin of Church of God missionary.

On 12 November 1954 n recognition of the Church of God Anderson, Indiana and her Kima mission recognized Esau Khamati Oriedo (who was in detention at Kapenguria for his role in the freedom movement) and his wife, Evangeline Ohana Olukhanya Oriedo, for their contribution to the Church of God Kima Mission, and their continued proselytizing of Christianity in Bunyore and the rest of the Nyanza region (present-day western Kenya and Nyanza Province in Kenya). The Church of God Kima Mission also awarded them the "Certificate of Marriage" issued ex post facto and signed by Rev. Daudi Otieno who was a clerk at the mission at time of the original wedding in 1923. This ex post facto acknowledgement, of Mr. and Mrs. Esau Khamati Oriedo's matrimony and stewardship to the church and Christianity, ushered in the beginning of a metamorphosis of the Church of God Mission' embrace of a more open attitude towards syncretism of the Christian doctrine with customary indigenous African values, which facilitated the effectiveness in the church's teaching of Scripture.

=== Colonial-era court clerk and interpreter ===
He was multi-lingual, capable of speaking and writing in several languages; because of this talent he was chosen by the British judiciary to become a court interpreter and clerk through which he acquired considerable knowledge and skills in the British legal system. During the struggle for Kenya's independence he used his knowledge of the British law to advocate for the rights of the Africans; he provided free legal representation to Africans charged with political crimes by the British colonial government in Kenya under the state of emergency rule and the general provisions of seditious speeches and acts.

He made effective use of his knowledge of British Judicature of Acts to provide legal representation and advocacy to trade unions and its members, and other native African organisations being targeted for persecution by the colonial government as political subversives.

=== Entrepreneur ===
He was a successful entrepreneur—a merchant and commercial miller with business enterprises across the country—North Nyanza, South Nyanza, and Central Provinces (Western, Nyanza, & Central provinces of Republic of Kenya; colonial era British Colony and Protectorate of Kenya). In 1938 he became the first African in the British Colony of Kenya to own and operate, in absolute, an automated commercial scale Posho/Grain Mill—for gristing and grinding maize and other genera of comestible grain—in North and South Nyanza regions in present-day Western and Nyanza provinces in the Republic of Kenya.

In the 1920s he established Oriedo, Esau & Sons trading company which later became a national enterprise with branches in all major cities of the British Colony of Kenya. He established an effective supply chain and brokerage infrastructure for the business, and was recognised accordingly in a report commissioned by US Agency for International Development on agro-industrial enterprises in Kenya. The Esau & Sons trading company was a conglomerate of diverse business units. He established one of the most effective business supply chain and brokerage infrastructure.

As a businessman he developed close and effective business partnerships and social friendships with the Kenyan Indian/Asian communities, including speaking Hindi with adequate reading & writing skills. Worthwhile to note that Indian merchants contributed immensely to economic development in colonial and postcolonial east Africa, albeit monopolising trade in the region. A summary of his major entrepreneurial accomplishments timeline entails.

1. In the 1920s he established Oriedo, Esau & Sons trading company which later became a national enterprise with branches in all major cities of the British Kenyan colony and independent Republic of Kenya.
2. 1938 — operated, as an outright sole owner, the first commercial scale grain Mill in North and South Nyanza provinces (present day Western & Nyanza provinces, respectively, in the Republic of Kenya) in British Colony and Protectorate of Kenya.
3. June 1964 — founding member of Kenya Chamber of Commerce and Industry, Bunyore Branch; which he spearheaded.
4. 1981 — was recognised accordingly by US Agency for International Development on agro-industrial enterprises in Kenya.

=== Philanthropy ===
Esau Oriedo was a philanthropist who supported multifaceted human causes. He led by example and was an inspirational role model to many Kenyans across ethnicities, geopolitical and economic spectra; he provided many, and of course his siblings, with formal educational opportunities to attain their highest possible potential. (Note: His younger brother, Bernard W. A. Oriedo (d. 20 January 1983), was such benefactor—of his academic bursaries and purposeful championing of formal education in colonial era Kenya—who took full advantage of the opportunity, gifted him by his elder brother, to attain his highest possible potential and became a very accomplished pharmacist. Also, Bernard was amongst a handful of native Kenyans of his generation (in the second decade of the 20th century) to be awarded an equivalent of today’s college diploma, in healthcare profession; three years after independence, Bernard was appointed to a nationwide post of Children’s Officer—one of the highest levels of civil service at the time—by former President Daniel T. Arap Moi, who was then the Minister for Home Affairs.) He gave property to his kinfolks, donated funds to business enterprises, to church organisations and to charity. He ensured that his relatives as well as his friends received education to literate and numerate, and achieved apprentice skills. He provided small business grants to many across ethnicities.

In 1923 he dispensed funding and land to spearhead the founding of Ebwali St. John's Anglican at Bunyore. Similarly, in 1924 he dispensed funding and land spearhead the founding of Ebwali Primary School; he provided bursaries and other kinds of financial support to help promote the welfare of those in need.

He campaigned for a comprehensive free and compulsory education in post-independence Kenya.

In 1964 he founded “Oriedo Self Help Society” (registered on 3 June 1964); a non-governmental charitable foundation whose primary objective was to further socioeconomic welfare of communities in Bunyore and beyond, via self-driven and outcome-based sustainable development initiatives aimed at establishing socioeconomic self-sufficiency in the region.

=== Military career ===
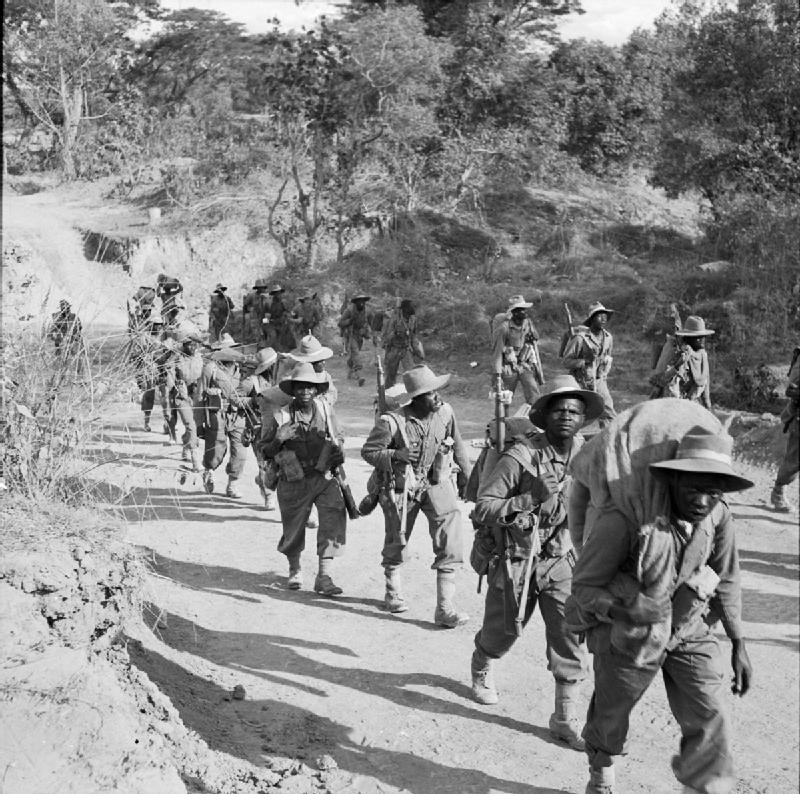
KAR-African Troops in Burma during the Second World War.

He was a veteran of two world wars—the First and the Second World War (WWI and WWII, respectively). He participated in the British Army's 1st King's African Rifles (KAR) operations in British East Africa 1914-1918 during the First World War (WWI); he was a porter and a mess hall cook, initially; but saw limited action at the close of the war. Whereas, in 1939 he was a frontline soldier in the British Army's “King’s African Rifle” (KAR) during the Second World War (WWII). In 1943 he assigned to the 11th (East Africa) Division of the KAR regiment which was formed the same year and sent to fight in Burma, present-day the Republic of the Union of Myanmar. He was a frontline infantryman in the Burma campaign.

During WWII, he fought alongside British soldiers, and fellow recruits from the vast British colonial and imperial empire worldwide over. The WWII experience was particularly edifying to Esau Khamati Oriedo; the experience augmented his functional tactical, operational, and strategic organisational leadership skills. This battle-hardened soldier and a student of the British military strategies, developed a profound appreciation for and understanding of nationhood as a pan-ethnic cause of organising the different native African population in the British Colony and Protectorate of Kenya into a single nation by aggregating and embracing her diverse ethnicities. He saw firsthand how soldiers from different races and ethnicities, and units fighting under the British banner were effectively leveraged accomplish common military outcomes.
