= Eric Edward Khasakhala =

Kenyan politician

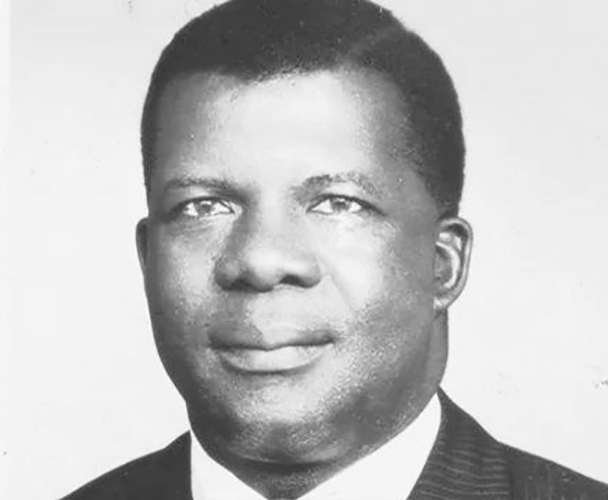
- Hon. Eric Edward Khasakhala 1963 parliamentary election campaign portrait

Cabinet Member - Assistant Minister (Kenya)
- In office 1963 – 31 December 1968; 1979 – 31 December 1988
- President: Jomo Kenyatta; Daniel arap Moi
- Preceded by: 1963 Office created 1979 Wilson Mukuna
- Succeeded by: 1969 Wilson Mukuna; 1989 Samuel Muhanji

Personal details
- Born: Eric Edward Kwendo Khasakhala; 26 March 1926 Ebwali Village at Bunyore, Kenya Colony
- Died: 14 July 2000 (aged 74) Nairobi, Kenya
- Party: Kenya African Democratic Union; Kenya African National Union
- Education: Maseno High School, Kenya
- Occupation: Politician
- Profession: Educationist, Businessman, and Politician
- Cabinet: Assistant Minister of Education Assistant Minister of Agriculture and Animal Husbandry; Assistant Minister of Information and Broadcasting Assistant Minister of Housing
- Committees: Chairman of Kenyan Cultural Council; Vice-Chairman of Commonwealth Parliamentary Association, Kenya Chapter

Eric Edward Khasakhala, known as "Omwana wa Kwendo" (26 March 1926 – 14 July 2000) was a Kenyan politician, educationist, Pan Africanist, independence activist, Cabinet Minister and one of the founding fathers of the Republic of Kenya. He was a participant of the delegation at the negotiations for Independence at the Lancaster House Conferences; he was instrumental in the formation of Kenya's Kenya African Democratic Union (KADU) party, which he served as one of the party officers. The KADU advocated for the federalist post independent Kenya.

Khasakhala was a political protégé of Esau Khamati Oriedo who indoctrinated him into politics and the early trade union movement^{,} that led to the formation of Kenya African Union (KAU)—the first truly all-inclusive pan-ethnic Kenyan political movement. Unlike his mentor, Khasakhala embodied a non-provocative, amicable political style, which endeared him to foe and comrade alike. Moreover, akin to his mentor, he embraced reconciliatory strategies and pan-ethnic Kenyanism. These are qualities which he acquired in part due to his formative years when he assisted his father who was a preacher and as a member of the aboriginal Ebwali village council of elders. These qualities earned him the recognition of the colonial governor, Sir Patrick Renisson; which occurred during Khasakhala's tenure as the headmaster of Ebwali African Government Primary school. Afterwards, he was transferred to Lunza Secondary School at Butere in Kisa where he served in the dual capacity as both teacher and headmaster; thus, becoming one of the first native African headmasters of a secondary school in colonial East Africa. During his tenure as the headmaster of Lunza Secondary School, the school witnessed extensively improved all-round academic outcomes. Preceding his vacating from an academic vocation, Khasakhala had become one of the most successful academicians, at the early educational level, in the colonial Kenya; a feat of great accomplishment du jour.

He started his successful political career in 1957, when he was elected secretary of North Nyanza District Congress. Moreover, in 1961 he was elected to the legislative Council of Kenya—popularly known as the LegCo—as a representative for the Nyanza North electoral constituency. He was later to be elected the first Member of Parliament for Emuhaya in 1963. He held the post of a regional vice-president for Western Province, one of the seven regional vice presidencies in postcolonial era Kenya period spanning 1966–1970.

He was an ardent champion of literacy and early education in Kenya; and was very much at home serving as an Assistant Minister for Education in the early 1960s in Jomo Kenyatta's cabinet. During his tenure as an Assistant Minister for Education he spearheaded the restructuring of the early education system infrastructure in embryonic postcolonial Kenya.

Albeit his relaxed reconciliatory and non-provocative amicable political style, which endeared him to foe and comrade, alike; Khasakhala was an ardently uncompromising advocate of social justice for his Nyole/Nyore people of Bunyore, a subtribe of the Luhya or Bantu Kavirondo, who were being marginalized and their land purloined from them by the more homogeneous and colonial era politically better connected archenemies the Luo tribe or Nilotic Kavirondo. Maseno settlement and township was one of the several key flashpoints. In 1965 as a member of the House of Representatives at the dawn of independence, he successfully defended the location of Maseno as Bunyore, to the chagrin of Okelo Odongo a Luo and fellow member of the legislator; the protagonist engaged in a bitter exchange from which Khasakhala would not back down. During the debate, another post-independence MP, lawyer Argwings Kodhek a Luo went as far as to claim that Khasakhala was behind the burning of his five houses.

Khasakhala was a cabinet member during the Kenyatta and Moi administrations. He maintained his positions through different political leadership changes. He did not hold a position as a full Cabinet minister during his career.

== Biography ==
=== Early life and education ===
Eric Edward Khasakhala was born at Ebwali village in the British Colony and Protectorate of Kenya in Western Kenya, to Zakayo "Daktari" Kwendo and Damary Oyando on 26 March 1926. His father was an illustrious local preacher, and the first medical doctor and a clinical officer in Bunyore; hence the nickname of "Daktari" (Kiswahili term for physician). His parents were the Luhya (Bantu Kavirondo) people of Bunyore; a gerontocratic acephalous society with a representative system of governance and collegial leadership structure composed of mainly a council of elders, theirs was a collegial system of Barraza to which his grandfather had been a member. Thus, Khasakhala's formative years were spent as an apprentice of his father—often assisted him with his various preaching and doctoring initiatives; it's also quite likely that Khasakhala, as the eldest son, was at his father's side the Barraza sessions. This might account for his amicable reconciliatory political style since the Nyore council of elders were key instruments of resolving conflicts among the populaces of their boroughs, as well as any inter-clan disputes.

==== Education ====
Khasakhala was educated at Church Missionary Society (CMS) mission schools and sat for a Cambridge School Certificate at Maseno High School; the oldest formal education school in Kenya, established in 1906 by the CMS Missionaries as a school for the children of African chiefs. He was schooled at Ebwali intermediate then joined Maseno Junior School then Maseno Secondary School (Present day Maseno High School).

=== Professional life ===
In concordance with the Nyore Luhya people of Bunyore—Bantu Kavirondo—traditions, Khasakhala, the firstborn male child, was groomed to succeed his father at an early age; whereby he horned his interpersonal, inter-psychic, and public speaking skills, he also developed an effective inter-relational acumen that served him well throughout his political career. After his father succumbed to illness and died on 13 July 1955, Khasakhala at age 29 became a political protégé of Esau Khamati Oriedo who indoctrinated him into politics and the early trade union movement.

Before immersing in politics, Khasakhala was a successful educationist—teacher and later promoted to become one of the African principals of a secondary school. Indeed, remained educationist at heart. Antecedently, he vehemently—he postcolonial Kenya—advocated for a robust education infrastructure throughout life. Needless add that his first cabinet appointment was Assistant Minister of Education, charged with crafting Kenya's first postcolonial educational system during the Kenyatta regime.

He was one of the first African members of the colonial legislatures, when in 1960 the colonial government ordered a nationwide election for 14 African Legislators to the colonial parliament. Khasakhala was the winner of the combined counties of Marama, Kisa, Maragoli, Tiriki and Bunyore; he became the first legislator for the combined region. In 1962 Khasakhala, together with the other 13 Members of Parliament, were taken to Britain for one-month edification on political governance and the parliamentary system. Upon their return to Kenya, they spearheaded a campaign that increased the number of legislators from 14 to 150. Eventually, new constituencies were created nationwide. The four regions Khasakhala had represented were split into four legislative constituencies. During the 1963 embryonic postcolonial era elections, he became the first Nyore to represent Bunyore in the national parliament.

Eric Khasakhala is remembered for the tarmac road from Luanda to Majengo.

==== Educationist ====
Before Khasakhala was immersed into politics, he was one of the first aboriginal African principals of an early education school in the colonial era Kenya; a progression from his illustrious teaching career which he had embarked on soon after completing his high school education at Maseno High School in 1944. As an educationist, he received commendations for his exemplary performance by the then Colonial governor Sir Patrick Renisson. Khasakhala was a strict disciplinarian who did not tolerate tardiness and an excused absenteeism from his students.

He was a teacher and later the headmaster of Ebwali Primary School at Bunyore. Afterwards, he was transferred to Lunza Secondary at Butere in Kisa where he served in the dual role of both teacher and headmaster; thus, becoming one of the first African headmasters of a secondary school in colonial Kenya.

A champion for restructuring the highly fettered and subjective colonial education system, as the first postcolonial cabinet member charged with overseeing the education system, Khasakhala inherited a pyramidal British colonial educational system. While political figures the likes of Tom Mboya focused on sending Kenyan students for higher education abroad—because East Africa had no true colleges—Khasakhala endeavored to develop the necessary academic infrastructure locally within Kenya. An independent Kenya would need an infrastructure to educate a generation of future nation builders. William X. Scheinman, a businessman and philanthropist, had observed that an independent Kenya would require a cadre of well-educated native bureaucrats, educators, businessmen, doctors, lawyers, and engineers; in Ghana, because such a cadre did not exist, Nkrumah had to retain many white colonial administrators.

Many of his educational initiatives became stagnated or rolled back following his defeat to Wilson Mukuna in a polemical one-party political system parliamentary election of 1969.

==== Struggle for Kenya's independence ====
In 1948 Khasakhala resigned from his teaching career and entered the national politics. The same year, at the behest of his uncle and political mentor—Esau Khamati Oriedo, who was a founding member of KAU—he joined the KAU party to fight for liberation, and was made the Secretary of the Party; a move that made him popular among his Bunyore people and nationwide.

During the turbulent pre-independent times, Khasakhala who was a representative of Bunyore in the Legislative Council (LegCo), hosted both Oginga Odinga and Tom Mboya at Kima to fetter their whereabouts from colonial authorities seeking their arrest and detention. Moreover, the two political heavyweights had brought to Kima financial resources from the US to facilitate Bunyore's struggle for Kenya's independence. be brought at Kima so that it could be used to fight the whites. Khasakhala was a representative of Bunyore. It was at this juncture that Khasakhala who was a founding member of KADU, and one of its senior officers announced his intention to ditch KADU and join KANU. In appreciation, the wealthy Oginga Odinga gave him a vehicle. However, it has been rumored that the vehicle was some sought of harsh money for allowing the annexation of Maseno by the Luo in Nyanza.

==== Political career and leadership ====
He started his exemplary political career in 1957, when he was elected secretary of North Nyanza District Congress. Between 1957 and 1960, he served as Secretary of all African Political Parties of Kenya. During the same period, he became one of the founder members of the Pan African Freedom Movement for East and Central Africa (PAFMECA), which was launched at Mwanza, Tanzania.

Khasakhala, a rising Political figure right from his inception into active Politics caused shockwaves in 1958 when he defeated political heavyweight, Tom Mboya to clinch the post of the Secretary of All Political Parties of Kenya. Mboya instantly became interested in this man and they became very close friends. Khasakhala—an innate Pan-African—joined Gikonyo Kiano, Ronald Ngala, Mboya and others travelling to Egypt and Tanzania to form the Convention of African Association, which would bring together African countries to form a united front in the struggle for independence and to promote Pan-Africanism.

He is historically remembered as the first Chief Whip of Independent Kenya, charged with the immense responsibilities of organising and running the affairs of the first Legislature.

He joined the legislative Council of Kenya in 1961 as a representative for Nyanza North. He joined the legislative Council of Kenya in 1961 as a representative for Nyanza North. Whereas, in 1962 he was among distinguished cadre of Kenyan leaders who attended the famous Lancaster House Conference, that drew up the postcolonial independent Kenya's Constitution. In 1963 he was elected the first Member of Parliament for Emuhaya in campaign spearheaded by his uncle and political don and the doyen freedom fighter Esau Khamati who elected in the same campaign to the local provincial council to represent the Emuhaya constituency.

He was a three-time member of parliament for the Emuhaya constituency—in 1963, and 1979–87. In a polemical one-party political system election of 1969, Khasakhala lost his parliamentary seat to Wilson Mukuna, a political novice. Khasakhala a veteran politician and the incumbent was expected to easily defeat the neophyte challenger. The defeat sent shockwaves across the country, especial in Bunyore. His defeat is attributed to multiple contravening factors in convergence against him; among these factors were his close association with Tom Mboya which was anathema to the Kenyan regime du jour, and the complacence of his electorate who were expecting an easy victory. Furthermore, the electoral process was fraught with irregularities. In a case that went all the way to highest court of the land, Khasakhala contested the outcome of election results but to avail. The next election cycle of 1974, which was but a fait accompli for Khasakhala to recapture the Emuhaya constituency parliamentary seat, he once again lost Mukuna. Pursuant legal challenges but were to no avail.

He represented Kenya as the vice chairman of the Commonwealth Kenya Chapter. During his tenure, he traveled across the globe attending various international conferences; he was an effective champion on across-spectrum of causes of great importance to Kenya and the African continent, especially on education and socioeconomic issues. Khaskhala also established enduring relationships with an all-inclusive cadre of international figures and entities.

==== Cabinet posts ====
As assistant minister for education in the early 1960s, he was instrumental in drafting and implementing the early education strategies for the embryonic republic. Between 1979 through 1988, Khasakhala also served intrepidly and devicefully in multitudinous cabinet roles during the Moi presidency; these included, the Ministry of Agriculture and Animal Husbandry, and the all-important Ministry of Information and Broadcasting.

He served the Kenyatta and Moi regimes diligently as a faithful minister.

=== Relationship and political misfortune ===
Khasakhala often fell a victim of his loyalty to friends. Albeit an illustrious political career, he never rose beyond the role of an assistant Cabinet Minister. Its argued that this was the adverse consequences of his unbendable loyalty to his political comrades—the unwillingness to betray others in return for political favors.

"Eric was a very good friend and confidante of Thomas Joseph Mboya", words of the 3rd Kenyan president, Mwai Kibaki, during Khasakhala's funeral.

This liaison with Mboya would cause ripples in the Kenyatta Government. In fact, so suspicious was the regime that despite Khasakhala's seniority in Western Province, Kenyatta opted to give Ministerial slots to Masinde Muliro and James Osogo, and the less colorful James Otiende fearing that this rising star would be a thorn in the flesh of the Cabinet. In 1966 when then Vice President Odinga had fallen out of grace, Mboya organised the famous Limuru Conference which saw eight regional Vice Presidents being elected representing each Province. Mboya's influence would be felt when he ensured the election of his comrades including Khasakhala, Moi, Nyagah, Ngala, Kibaki, Sagini among others. Khasakhala remained a loyal friend and confidant of Tom Mboya. It is noted historically that Khasakhala and Kibaki are remembered as some of the only brave government officials who attended and were welcomed to Mboya's tense Funeral at Rising Island in 1969.

In 1978 Daniel Toroitich arap Moi succeeded Jomo Kenyatta (d. 1978) to become Kenya's 2nd postcolonial president. Moi's presidency gave rise to Moses Mudavadi as a potently influential Cabinet Minister in the Moi regime. Mudavadi was never comfortable with Khasakhala, Joshua Angatia, Martin Shikuku and other fellow Kakamega leaders. He was instrumental in rigging them out in the infamous 1988, "Mlolongo elections", replacing them with his sycophants. Previously in 1987 Khasakhala had played host to then Vice President Mwai Kibaki and other leaders in what became a very successful harambee for Bunyore schools. It was during the period when Kanu was steadily sidelining Kibaki, thus anyone who associated with him was perceived to be an anti-establishment. The event attracted many of Khasakhala's old friends including Kenneth Matiba, and a host of leaders from all walks of life. Mudavadi snubbed the event.

Khasakhala never abandoned his friends, at whatever cost or consequence. That was one of his greatest values, and may well have been the cause of his imminent downfall.

=== Culture and good governance ===
His tenure, 1979 – 1988, as the chairman of the Kenya Cultural Council witnessed prolific prominence and recognition of culture in Kenya. Until then, dating back to the colonial era, African culture in Kenya had not received the prominence it deserved. Moreover, he was instrumental in spearheading the enactment of a dynamic national cultural policy to make certain that pertinent changes and amendments in the law were being aptly undertaken in synergy with new realities. Among a plethora of his most effective initiatives in the antecedent capacity were the strengthening and enlargement of cultural activities across the country; and the increase in the council's annual budgetary allocations. In all, his tenure witnessed a period of amplified holistic emphasis on culture in the country.

Between 1979 – 1988 he was the vice-chair of the Kenya Chapter of the Commonwealth Parliamentary Association (CPA); a body whose stated values personifies Khasakhala's ardor for good governance in service to his constituents and country. The CPA stated statement of purpose is to build interparliamentary and other intergovernmental communities relationships that spawns promotion of the benchmarks of good governance and the implementation of the enduring values of the Commonwealth. It does so by establishing conducive environment that bringing Parliamentarians and parliamentary staff together to exchange ideas among themselves and with experts in various fields, to identify benchmarks of good practices and new policy options they can adopt or adapt in the governance of their societies.

=== Personal life ===
==== Death ====
Eric Edward Khasakhala died from lung cancer on 14 July 2000 at the Aga Khan Hospital at Nairobi in Kenya, where he spent a month. His remains are interred at his ancestral home at Ebwali village at Bunyore in Kenya.

A Requiem Mass was held at All Saints' Cathedral, Nairobi. The service was performed by the Reverend Peter Njoka, the Provost of All Saints' Cathedral on Wednesday 26 July 2000. He was eulogized en masse by a large crowd of people.

Tributes were read by family members, Cabinet ministers, and others during the funeral and burial services at Ebwali village in Bunyore. An estimated crowd of over twenty-five thousand people lined up the routes and filled the local school.

==== Commemoration ====
Plans are underway to celebrate Khasakhala's myriad of contributions, to Bunyore and Kenya, by renaming the tarmac road from Luanda to Majengo in his honor—the Eric Edward Khasakhala Memorial Highway.

== Slideshow photo gallery ==
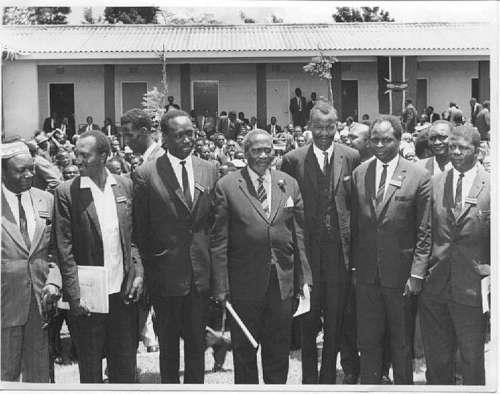
Hon. Eric Edward Khasakhala with Kenya's 1st president, the late Mzee Jomo Kenyatta, and the future Kenya's 3rd president, Hon. Mwai Kibaki.

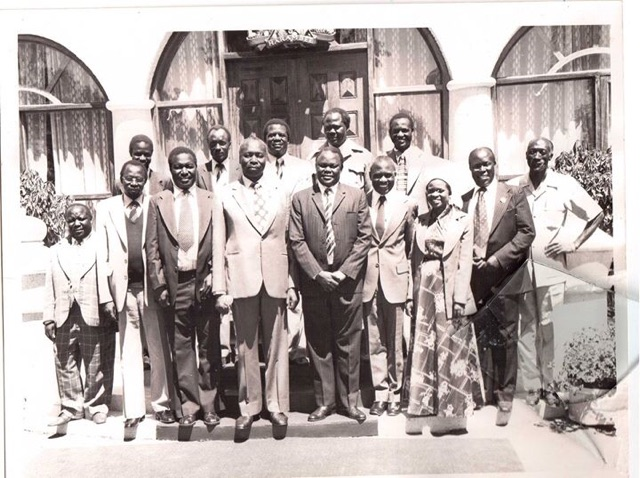
Hon. Eric Edward Khasakhala with the former president Moi, Kenya's 2nd post-independent president.

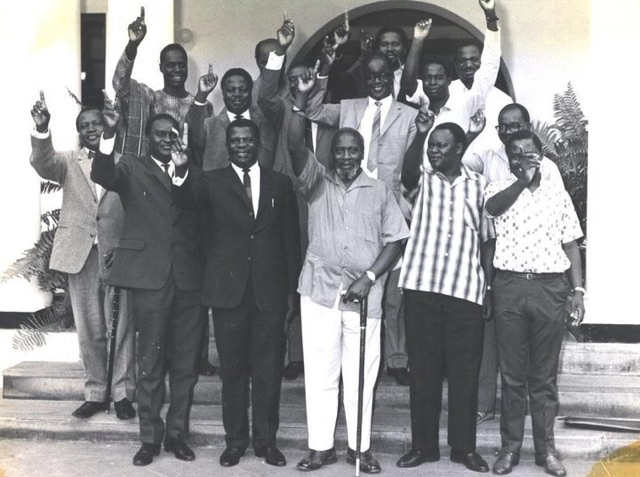
Hon. Eric Edward Khasakhala with the late president Kenyatta, Kenya's 1st post-independent president.

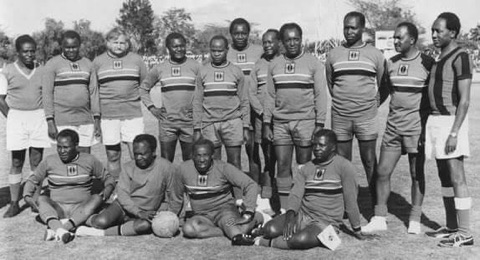
Khasakhala and fellow cabinet ministers members of the cabinet football team that played against fellow members of parliament, known as the "backbenchers". The cabinet team included Tom Mboya, Moi, Kibaki, and others.
