= ITC Enschede =

Coordinates: 52°14′17.93″N 6°51′13.45″E

Faculty of Geo-Information Science and Earth Observation (ITC) of the University of Twente
- Established: 1950
- Location: Enschede, Netherlands
- Successor: University of Twente
- Website: http://www.itc.nl/

The International Institute for Geo-Information Science and Earth Observation (ITC) was an institute of higher (tertiary) education located in Enschede, Netherlands. As of 1 January 2010 it has been incorporated into the University of Twente as the sixth faculty, while preserving its unique international character as a faculty sui generis, and is now formally known as University of Twente, Faculty of Geo-Information Science and Earth Observation (ITC).

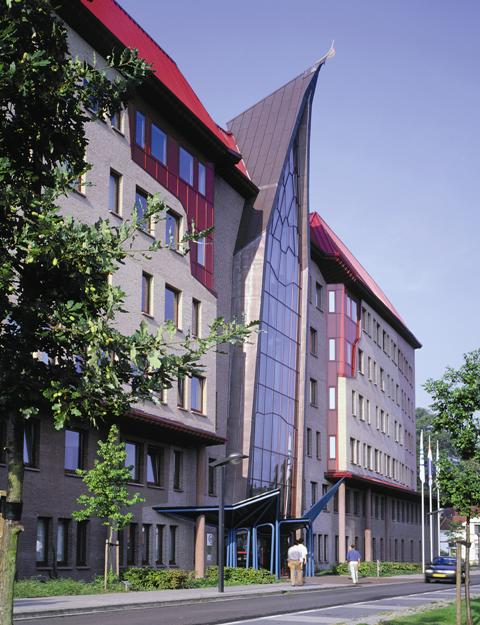
Previous location of the International Institute for Geo-information Science and Earth Observation

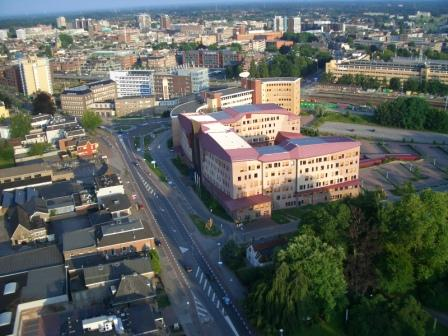
An aerial view of previous ITC Building

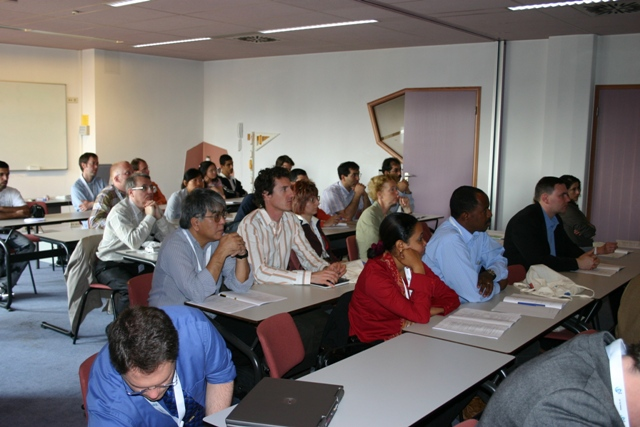
A typical class in session at ITC

== History and mission ==
ITC was founded in 1950 with the name "International Training Centre for Aerial Survey" by the former Prime Minister of the Netherlands, Prof. Dr. Willem Schermerhorn to provide training in map making as an aid to developing countries. Over the years its mission has been adjusted to changing technological and development realities, so that today it offers MSc, Master's, Diploma and Certificate courses in Geo-information Science (GIS) and Earth Observation (EO) with emphasis on applications in developing countries. In addition, ITC undertakes applied and technological consultancy projects worldwide and contributes to fundamental research in the fields of its expertise.

== Education at ITC ==
More than 19,000 students from over 170 countries have followed ITC courses since 1950. The institute's degrees are accredited by the Dutch system of higher education.

ITC offers MSc degree, diploma and certificate courses in geo-information science and earth observation applied to eight domains: Disaster management; Earth sciences; Geoinformatics; Governance; Land administration; Natural resources; Urban planning; and Water resources.

ITC provides a PhD degree programme by research in the field of geo-information science with an application in areas of global sustainable development.

ITC has several joint educational programmes with partner institutes in the developing world, for example joint MSc programmes in geoinformatics with the Indian Institute of Remote Sensing in Dehradun, India and Gadjah Mada University in Yogyakarta, Indonesia. It also offers much of its curriculum as distance education modules, and offers custom training courses to meet specific capacity building requirements, both in Enschede and abroad.

== Notable alumni ==
- Siti Nurbaya Bakar, 1988, Indonesia
- Wilber Otichilo, 1982, Kenya
- Vishnu Nandan, 2012, India, now Canada, participated in MOSAiC
- Daryll Mathew, 2000, Antigua and Barbuda
- Amon Murwira, 2003, Zimbabwe
