= Mary Akatsa =

Mary Sinaida Akatsa
- Born: 1964; Ebusiralo, Bunyore
- Died: 26 October 2024 (aged 59–60)
- Burial place: Kawangware
- Occupation: Gospel Minister
- Spouse: Francis Akatsa

Mary Sinaida Akatsa (1964 – 26 October 2024) was a Kenyan Pentecostal minister. She was a self-proclaimed "prophetess" and the founder of the Jerusalem Church of Christ.

== Early life, marriage and family ==
Akatsa was born in 1964 at Ebusiralo village in Bunyore in the current Vihiga county, Western Kenya. Her parents were Stanley Jogoo and Veronica. Akatsa's mother died in childbirth and she was raised by her maternal grandmother. Akatsa begun schooling at Itabalya primary school. She only studied up to the third grade and dropped out of school. Akatsa was employed as a house-help on a farm in Kikuyu and later married Francis Akatsa.

== Ministry ==
In 1985, Akatsa founded the Jerusalem Church of Christ. She enforced discipline among her congregants by use of a cane. Akatsa claimed to be able to heal the sick, the lame and those struggling with infertility. Akatsa remained active into the 2010s.

== Later life ==
Akatsa died from health complications on 26 October 2024. She was buried at her church in November 2024.
