= Blasio Vincent Ndale Esau Oriedo =

Kenyan doctor (1931–1966)

Dr. Blasio Vincent Oriedo
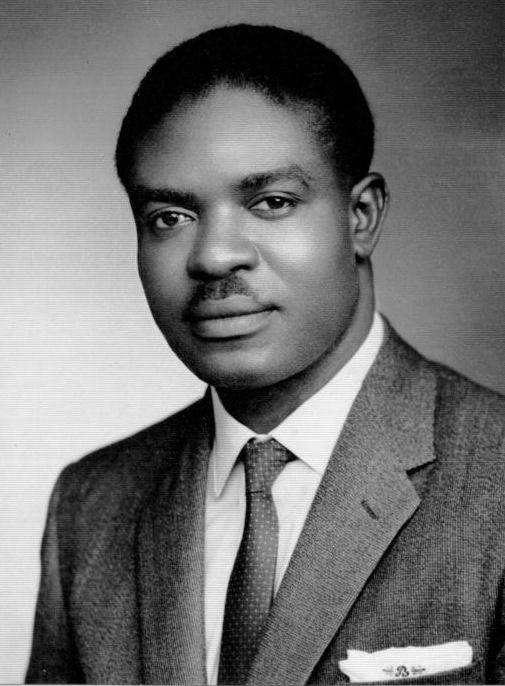
- Oriedo c. 1962
- Born: 15 September 1931; Ebwali Village, Bunyore, Kenya Colony
- Died: 26 January 1966 (aged 34); Aga Khan University Hospital, Nairobi, Kenya
- Education: London School of Hygiene & Tropical Medicine, Doctor of Public Health (DPH)
- Occupations: Epidemiologist, parasitologist, physician, author, hygienist, medical research
- Years active: 1948–1966
- Known for: Contribution to tropical medicine and public health; fighting disease epidemics in Africa; for medical research in the epidemiology of East African leishmaniasis.
- Relatives: Esau Khamati Oriedo (father)
- Medical career
- Profession: Epidemiologist, parasitologist, physician, author, hygienist, medical researcher
- Field: Tropical medicine, public health, vector-borne epidemiological disease
- Institutions: Ministry of Health and Housing, Kenya; Medical Research Division of Insect-Borne Diseases, Kenya Colony; Colonial Medical Services; Medical Department of Kenya Colony; East African High Commission's Bureau of Research in Medicine and Hygiene
- Sub-specialties: Leishmaniasis (kala-azar)
- Research: Tropical diseases
- Notable works: Tropical diseases: Studies in Epidemiology of East African (Leishmaniasis) Campaign Against Disease Epidemics: 1952 Kala-azar (black fever) or visceral leishmaniasis epidemic; 1954 enteric/typhoid fever epidemic; 1960 Kwashiorkor epidemic; and 1950s/1960s plasmodium falciparum malaria epidemics
- Awards: Tripartite laureate fellow; NIH Extramural (Medical) Researcher; Special Achievement and Contribution to Public Health—The East African Bureau of Research in Medicine and Hygiene;The Dutch Royal Institute fellow; Bukusu Omukasa

Dr. Blasio Vincent Oriedo, in full Dr. Blasio Vincent Ndale Esau Oriedo (born 15 September 1931, Ebwali Village in Bunyore, Kenya Colony—died 26 January 1966, Aga Khan University Hospital, Nairobi, Kenya) was an African epidemiologist and a parasitological scientist known for his contributions to tropical medicine and work to stem disease epidemics in colonial and postcolonial Kenya, the countries of East and Central Africa, and the Sudan.

Oriedo was a patron of academic, healthcare, and socioeconomic development in East and Central Africa. He developed an interdisciplinary approach that connected the struggle for political freedom in Kenya with fully integrated healthcare, intellectual, socioeconomic, and civil infrastructures especially in the rural regions that bore the brunt of disease epidemics and their socioeconomic and sociocultural consequences. He embraced a revolutionary epidemiological perspective towards the economic and intellectual consequences of disease or public health strategy across the East and Central African region. He served as a member of Tom Mboya's interdisciplinary economic development advisory team from 1965 until his death in January 1966.

Oriedo was one of the forces behind the late 1950s–early 1960s US academic scholarship programme for East African students— The Kennedy Airlift.

== Biography ==
Oriedo was born to Esau Khamati Oriedo (d. 1 December 1992) and Evangeline Olukhanya Ohana Analo-Oriedo (d. 11 July 1982), both from the western Kenya's Luhya ethnic group of the Bantu lineage. His father was a Kenyan politician (freedom fighter and colonial-era political detainee, district representative and once chairman of the North Nyanza Local Native Council), an entrepreneur, philanthropist, and a veteran of World Wars I and II. He was a Christian who challenged early white Christian missionaries in East Africa to embrace the African cultures as congruent with the Christian credo.

He received early education at government and mission schools, and sat, successfully with distinction, for the Cambridge School Certificate in 1946 at the former Government African School at Kakamega in North Nyanza (present-day Kakamega High School at Kakamega in western Kenya). (Note: His father, Esau Oriedo, as a district representative to the Local Native Council (LNC) of North Nyanza — aka North Kavirondo District Council — was an ardent advocate for literacy and higher education, and a key protagonist in the founding of the school under the auspices of the North Kavirondo District LNC in 1932.)

He was the first and the youngest native East and Central African epidemiologist in the field of tropical medicine and infectious diseases—both as researcher and a clinical practitioner—in the spread, control, and eradication of infectious agents. His parasitological epidemiology medical research and resulting treatments have received global acclaim and application. He supported indigenous medical research and the dissemination of homegrown scientific medical information. He foresaw this informational approach as an effective and dynamic forum for interchange of knowledge and viewpoints amongst various indigenous healthcare communities and their counterparts abroad.. His epidemiological medical research of the East African Leishmaniasis or kala-azar (black fever) has bred critical knowledge for worldwide use in both private and public health sectors, and civil societies. In 1964 he attended, as an invited expert panelist, the XII International Congress of Entomology at London, United Kingdom.

He was a supporter of health care as a basic human right long before the 1978 Alma Ata Declaration proclamation. In 1960 he directed a healthcare and hygiene strategy of tactical, strategic, operational, and performance indexing; a short-term and long-term planning strategy based on the application of preventative modalities that helped shift the medical science paradigm—in East Africa—away from the undue emphasis on curative means, and more so towards a balanced approach. That which effectually integrated strategic epidemiological knowledge with tactical, operational, and situational curative approaches.

He promoted and nurtured coordinated approaches, amongst healthcare practitioners and related bodies, to facilitate the most effective seamlessly integrated dispensary and operations of public health and other civic and societal welfare services. As of 1950 until his abrupt and inexplicable death in 1966, he is credited with stemming the tide of numerous endemic and pandemic diseases in the East and Central African regions and the Sudan. The following are examples of those feats.

A confidante of Tom Mboya, he allied with Mboya to successfully champion US education opportunities for East African Students.

He was a patron of academics, healthcare, and socioeconomic development in East Africa. While fighting disease epidemics across the region he remarked on the decrepit infrastructure in large the areas of the country to the detriment of socioeconomic, healthcare, and intellectual progress. This experience led him to crusade for rural citizens. He declined a career in politics, despite being lobbied by his associates enter politics. (Note: In a communiqué, he cautioned the nascent Kenyan political cadre of the liberation movement against a gullibility towards an impetuous independence—opining that such a move, meagerly developed civil institutions, could lead to a vacuous independence and vassalage statehood, unless wholesome tactical and strategic civil institutional infrastructures were in place to remedy the situation at the time of independence. He argued that Africans had yet to achieve sufficient "critical-to-success" intellectual, healthcare, and socioeconomic resources and infrastructure for a comprehensive wholesome liberation—Africanized self-governance. During his epidemiological research and fight against disease epidemics, in the rustic and urban regions across East and Central Africa, he had come face-to-face with the abominable high rates of poverty among the native populations those regions, the economic hardship that was a consequence of the repugnantly undue health care and hygienic woes which most aboriginals endured.) Later he served, at Tom Mboya's behest, as a member of Mboya's multidisciplinary economic development team from 1965 until his death in January 1966.

He was a staunch opponent of fraud and abuse of the public trust; utterly stubborn—an uncompromising scrupulous—and demonstrative disdain for and impatient towards ineptitude. He was an outspoken critic of vice by those in power; thus, his policies became anathema to the rulers of colonial Kenya, and most postcolonial bureaucrats and political elites of the embryonic independent Kenya. In 1965, upon his return from a conference in the Netherlands and other official engagements in Europe, he summarily terminated the employment of several expatriates and native personnel for graft, ineptitude, and absconding from duty. His actions met with ad hominem assaults from a cadre of bureaucrats and political elites; nevertheless, he stood his ground and refused to be intimidated into rescinding the edicts. His view was that these public servants worked solely to enrich and empower themselves.

A cadre of multidisciplinary and racially diverse (Africans, Indo-Asiatics, Caucasians, Arabs, etc.) contemporaries from across East Africa flocked to his residence to indulge in social intercourse—interchange of ideals and ideas, entertainment, debate local and international affairs and geopolitics du jour. He was known to his contemporaries as "Jaraha"—a hybrid Kiswahili-Dhuluo idiom for "en vogue socialite" or the "cosmopolitan". His associates included Tom Mboya (d. 1969)—with whom they were confidantes; Sir Philip Edmund Clinton Manson-Bahr (d. 1966)—the son-in-law of Sir Patrick Mason, the doyen founder of the field of tropical medicine; Dr. Apollo Milton Obote—led Uganda to independence from Britain in 1962, becoming prime minister and the president twice; Prof. Hillary Ojiambo; Masinde Muliro; Charles Njonjo; Kitili Maluki Mwendwa; Elijah Wasike Mwangale; Paul Ngei; Fred Kubai; Achieng Oneko; Joseph Otiende; Dr Julius Gikonyo Kiano; Argwings Kodhek; Dr. B. A. Southgate—British Colonial Medical office, London; Dr. R. Bowen; and Dr. R. B. Heisch; to name but a few.

=== Early life ===
Dr. BV Oriedo was born to Esau Khamati Oriedo (d. 1 December 1992) and Evangeline Olukhanya Ohana Analo-Oriedo (d. 11 July 1982), both from western Kenya's Luhya tribe of Africa's Bantu lineage. His mother was a homemaker, a domestic economics educator, and an ardent advocate of women rights. Whereas his father was a consummate Kenyan statesman, politician (1910s – 1960s), and an anti-colonialism activist and freedom fighter who had been detained, 1952–1956, alongside Paramount Chief Koinange and Jomo Kenyatta (the first President of the Republic of Kenya), and a cadre of other anti-colonialists during the campaign for Kenya's independence from the British rule. Esau Oriedo was also an entrepreneur and trade unionist, a staunch crusader of Christianity's embrace of indigenous African cultures.

=== Education ===
He received early education at government and mission schools, and sat, successfully with distinction, for Cambridge School Certificate in 1946 at the former Government African School at Kakamega in North Nyanza (present-day Kakamega High School at Kakamega in western Kenya). He attended the prestigious Royal Institute of Medicine & Public Health (RIMPH), an elite conjoined Government College at Kabete in suburban Nairobi, Kenya which catered to cerebrally gifted scholars in East and Central Africa; where he pursued an interdisciplinary degree in medicine—with focus on public health, hygiene, and disease prevention medicine program. During his tenure of study at the Royal Institute of Medicine & Public Health, he secured an internship as a staff researcher assistant with the Division of Insect-Borne Diseases at Medical Research Laboratory, Nairobi. In 1950 he completed his college education at the RIMPH, graduating with high honours. In the same year of his college graduation he successfully completed the board certification exams, administered from London in Great Britain; he became a Licentiate of the Royal College of Physicians of London. The certification and licensure qualified him for a job classification of a senior public health officer — a rank exclusively earmarked for Briton or Caucasian medical expatriates possessing Great Britain medical degrees or analogous European qualifications. Moreover, his qualifications exceeded the requirements for employment by the Colonial Medical Service — the organization responsible for dispensation of healthcare services and policy initiatives in the British Overseas Territories. Instead, he was appointed to an inferior position as an African assistant medical officer (AAMO). He rebuffed the appointment; in 1951 he was actualized as a senior public health officer with de jure commission which permitted him to serve across the East and Central African region. He also qualified for assignments under the auspices of the Colonial Medical Service.^{[} In 1954 he received academic fellowship to study tropical medicine & parasitological epidemiology in the United Kingdom at the London School of Hygiene & Tropical Medicine. His research thesis was on the vector-borne tropical diseases; it focused on the epidemiology of East African leishmaniasis (kala-azar), and attained a DPH. In 1957 he was a recipient of an associate research scientist fellowship from Tulane University's Medical College's School of Public Health and Tropical Medicine at New Orleans in United States—he continued, fruitfully, to collaborate his work in East Africa with Tulane University until his precipitously inexplicable death in January 1966. He was also a recipient of a research stipend awarded by the Dutch Royal Institute in the Netherlands; the institute actively promoted his research on the "vector-borne tropical diseases: epidemiology of East African leishmaniasis (kala-azar)” in the Netherlands and other European countries. He worked feverishly, with diligent acumen, effectively combining vocational duties and scholarship research with travel abroad to various international scholarly medical conferences and special proceedings to promote awareness of the tropical diseases in Africa; and to help stimulate funding for research and drug discovery to stem epidemics and other preventable diseases on the continent. An epic accomplishment for an under 30-year old native African at the apogee of European colonialism in East Africa! In 1959 he gained full membership to The Royal Society of Tropical Medicine and Hygiene—a London-based organization promoting the study, control and prevention of tropical disease, and facilitation of discussion and exchange of information among those interested in tropical diseases and international health, and the overall promotion of the work of those interested in these objectives. In 1962, through his collaborative research with Tulane University's Medical College's School of Tropical and Infectious Diseases, he was endowed with a prestigious extramural medical research grant from the NIH—an agency of the United States Department of Health and Human Services.

=== Professional life ===
Throughout his career he worked at the Ministry of Health and Housing, Nairobi, Kenya, and the Nairobi-based Division of Insect-Borne Diseases at Medical Research Laboratory under the auspices of the British Colonial Medical Services. In 1950, he attained a diploma in public health and preventive medicine (DPH) from the Royal Institute of Medicine & Public Health. At the age nineteen, he became the youngest native person in the East and Central African region to autonomously engage in active interdisciplinary medical research in epidemiology and parasitology. After completion of board certification exams and licensure, he was actualized in 1951 to the rank of a senior (principal) public health officer under the Ministry of Health and Housing, Nairobi, Kenya. He became the first and the only native person, to hold such commission across the British East Africa Colony and Protectorate. He was later to become the first native East African epidemiologist in the field of tropical medicine and infectious diseases. He served as an epidemiologist in dual capacity under the Colonial Medical Services and the Ministry of Health and Housing in the colonial and post-colonial Kenya.

In 1964 he was invited to panel of specialists at the XII International Congress of Entomology at London, United Kingdom.

==== Campaign against infectious disease ====
He coordinated approaches among healthcare practitioners and related bodies to manage the delivery of healthcare, socioeconomic, and social welfare services. He addressed the socioeconomic, sociocultural, and socio-ecological impacts of disease or injury on individuals, communities, and organizations. He worked with stakeholders in interdisciplinary partnerships to develop and implement disease prevention initiatives. These initiatives were intended to be evidence-based and tailored to the target population. Their performance was evaluated through measurable metrics.

As of 1950 until his abrupt and inexplicable death in 1966, he is credited with stemming the tide of numerous endemic and pandemic diseases in the East and Central African regions and the Sudan; and a forfending of thousands of human lives. In 1959 he spearheaded an intensified malaria eradication campaign in the East African highlands that helped to reduce malaria epidemics in the region.

==== Visceral leishmaniasis epidemic ====
In October 1952, Oriedo led efforts to contain a visceral leishmaniasis outbreak in Kenya, parts of Uganda, and Sudan. In 1954 the disease was arrested.

==== Typhoid fever epidemic ====
In 1954 Oriedo led a successful government campaign to stem typhoid fever epidemic in present-day Kenya and Uganda. In the North Kavirondo region of Kenya's Mount Elgon District, Bungoma County was one of hardest-hit areas. The disease ravaged the ethnic Bukusu population. His efforts to halt the disease were recognized by the Bukusu people who honoured him as a great healer by granting him the honorary title of omukasa, a Bukusu chieftain. His accomplishment also earned him a research stipend from the London School of Hygiene & Tropical Medicine.

==== Kwashiorkor ====
In the 1940s kwashiorkor was a yet ill-defined nutritional disorder in Africa. Mortality-rates among children were disturbingly high. In 1960, based on his prior successful campaigns against epidemic disease outbreaks, colonial authorities gave Oriedo the job of creating a roadmap to guide and coordinate the kwashiorkor crisis management team. Using available data, he focused on the Kikuyu ethnic group, in one of the localities where the disease was rampant. The Kikuyu campaign was successful. The lessons learnt from the Kikuyu campaign gave impetus to an effective national strategy. One of the key elements of the programme was a national school milk program which provided a daily milk ration to children during morning and afternoon recesses. Teachers were required to check pupils for health and hygiene during physical education (PE) periods and schools were charged with keeping up-to-date student immunisation records. (Note: The Kenya school milk program is a classic example of "reinventing the wheel". Per Bwibo et al., The Journal of Nutrition, 133.11 (2003): 3936S-3940S, the program was started in 1982 by the president of the Republic of Kenya, yet in 1960 the school milk program had been implemented in Kenya and Uganda pursuant to Oriedo's strategy to eradicate kwashiorkor. His programme was a constituent part of a larger public health strategy which he helped devise.)

==== Plasmodium falciparum malaria epidemics campaign ====
During the late 1950s and 1960s he championed, coordinated, and buoyed the campaign against malaria amongst African and Asian communities in East Africa where the disease epidemics was poignantly endemic and had exacted a heavy mortality toll. Those communities, especially the native African tribes were mostly remote and in disadvantaged settings. Preceding his efforts, those communities had received, at best, spasmodic attention from the colonial regime. For instance, the 1961 heavy rainfall brought flooding and the rise of the outbreaks of malaria epidemics that extended deeply into the hinterland. He was a major force behind the resourcefulness in formulating and implementing an extensive public health control program; elements of the program entailed leveraging-in successful aspects from the Nairobi campaign of 1940 epidemic, scouting and mapping out the breeding sites, conducting entomological and epidemiological studies, oiling and larviciding of stagnant waters and bushes, and mass chemoprophylaxis administration. The approach succeeded in containing malaria epidemics in several remote and disadvantaged settings amongst African and Asian communities. (Note: These approaches had previously been successfully used in the 1940s in Nairobi)

==== Situational, tactical, operational, and strategical national health system ====
He was a strong proponent of an important performance indexed healthcare quality improvement program (Note: The plan was unpretentious. The primary objective was to improve health wellness (The absence of disease or infirmity—optimal physical and mental well-being—stemming adverse socioeconomic, sociocultural and socio-ecological consequences of disease.) and intellectual & civic infrastructure standards across the Eastern Africa region. One of the chief provisos focused on pupils from daycare through college. Every single pupil was required to participate in health and fitness education programs. School officials were tasked with implementing and sustaining pertinent performance indexed programs which included maintaining each pupil's health and hygiene records that included weekly hygiene, nutritional, and fitness assessments. Thus, school officials were tasked with compliance, whereas public health officials were tasked with formulation, implementation, and enforcement.) which raised immunization coverage levels of inoculation preventable diseases by lessening missed opportunities to vaccinate, vigilant administration of accountability requirements, and the overall improved standards of practices for health wellness and fitness, at all levels, in the Eastern Africa region. In 1960, he was one of the key architects of a dynamical interdisciplinary multicomponent and multigenerational public health, a healthcare and hygiene strategy of long-term planning based on the application of preventative modalities that helped shift the medical science paradigm—in East Africa—away from the undue emphasis on curative means, and more so towards a balanced approach; that which seeks to adapt public health strategies that effectively integrates epidemiological, parasitological, and etiological knowledge with tactical and situational curative approaches.The desired key outcomes included the prevention of disease or infectious agents, disability, malnutrition, and mortality rate—especially among the vulnerable populations of children, youth, and young adults—by means of immunization, hygiene, nutrition (e.g., providing free fluid whole milk for school children as part of his campaign against kwashiorkor epidemic outbreaks), and dietary supplement with multivitamins, and by control of contagious, parasitic and related diseases. The antecedent healthcare and hygiene strategy received the commendation of the British colonial East African High Commission and the British Colonial Medical Services in London; the strategy was adapted by the commission and Kenya's Ministry of Health and Housing. The program forms the organizational rudiments of the present healthcare and hygiene strategy in East Africa.

==== An epidemiological perspective to economic consequences of disease ====
As a physician and public health official, Oriedo developed an interdisciplinary approach that linked public health with social, economic, and institutional factors in East Africa, particularly in rural areas. According to the cited source, he argued that improving healthcare required not only trained medical professionals but also the development of local health infrastructure and institutions.

==== Regulating native medicinal practices ====
Throughout his career, Oriedo sought to regulate dubious folk medicine and mysticism that had remained a central sociocultural institution across East Africa. He was a vocal critic of indigenous practices that placed the well-being of native communities in peril and easy prey for quacks. He recommended founding an ethnomedicine advisory board, at the national and provincial levels, under the auspices of the Ministry of Health and Housing; a board whose composition would include traditional healers and modern healthcare practitioners.

==== Medical research ====
In 1953 and 1954, he was an invited panelist at the East Africa High Commission Scientific Conference under the aegis of the London-based Colonial Office of United Kingdom. On 11 January 1961, an abstract of the first series of his epidemiological medical studies of East African Leishmaniasis (kala-azar) was presented before conference on "The Epidemiology of Arthropod-borne Diseases", at Nairobi. The work was well received, and has enjoyed sweeping application and has been widely cited. His work in tropical medicine, hygiene, and infectious diseases has been posthumously published by collaborators, such as fellow laureate Dr. BA Southgate, and others.

In 1964, he was a recipient of a coveted medical research grant furnished by the US National Institutes of Health (NIH), Extramural Research Program. The grant was in support of his epidemiological, parasitological, and etiological research in tropical medicine and infectious diseases in East Africa. Oriedo's work has received global acclaim and application.
