= Reuben Olembo =

Kenyan academic, scientist and environmentalist

Reuben James Olembo
- Born: 1937; Bunyore
- Died: 2005 (aged 67–68)
- Occupations: Academic; Scientist; Environmentalist; Conservationist

Academic background
- Education: Purdue University

Professor Reuben James Olembo (1937–2005) was a prominent Kenyan academic, scientist and environmentalist. He was a deputy executive director of the United Nations Environment Programme (UNEP), which he played a pivotal role in helping found, and served as United Nations Assistant Secretary General from 1994 to 1998. He became the Acting Secretary General of the Convention on International Trade in Endangered Species of Wild Fauna and Flora (CITES), after his retirement from UNEP.

== Early life ==
Reuben Olembo was born on November 28, 1937, in Bunyore in the then Vihiga District of Kakamega in Western Province, Kenya. He excelled in his studies at Kima Primary School, and then Maseno School, both of which were mission schools. Faith played a key role in his early family life and education. His parents were both ministers in the Church of God, established in his village by American missionaries.

Olembo was among the first cohort of students airlifted to the US in 1959 as part of the Kennedy- Mboya airlifts, having rejected an opportunity to study at Cambridge University in the United Kingdom. He attended Purdue University in Indiana and between 1961 and 1965 he was awarded his bachelor's (Biology and Chemistry), master's and doctoral degrees (genetics, with minors in biochemistry and statistics). His academic accomplishments were notable because "he did not come from a scientific background and had no laboratory experience."

Olembo taught at Makerere University in Uganda between 1965 and 1969, where he earned the nickname "Prof." He is said to have helped many Ugandans enter the UN system through scholarships and was instrumental in the establishment of Makerere University's National Institute for Environment.

Olembo moved back to Kenya to join the Department of Botany at the University of Nairobi. He was appointed chairman of the department in 1970, aged 33. He remained in that position till 1975. He was the first Kenyan to be a professor in the department and to head it. He introduced new, rigorous courses in genetics at both the undergraduate and post-graduate levels.

Olembo was a strong advocate for education in Kenya and neighboring countries. He served as an examiner for the Cambridge University School Certificate, a chief examiner for the East African Examinations Council, and an external assessor for university degrees in Nigeria, Ghana, and Tanzania.

He wrote and was widely published on genetics, ecology and environmental policy.

== International career ==
Olembo was a member of the African delegation to the 1972 Stockholm Conference that led to the creation of UNEP. He joined the organisation in 1974 as a Senior Programme Officer. He played key roles in strengthening a number of Multilateral Environmental Agreements (MEAS) such as the Convention on International Trade in Endangered Species of Flora and Fauna (CITES), where he was interim Secretary-General between 1998 and 1999; the Convention on Migratory Species (CMS), the UN Convention on Biological Diversity (CBD), the UN Convention to Combat Desertification (UNCCD), and the FAO International Treaty on Plant Genetic Resources for Food and Agriculture. During his tenure with UNEP, Dr. Olembo also oversaw the development of The World Conservation Strategy, a major document on conservation of living resources for sustainable resources. It has become the primary reference for world-wide national conservation strategies and policies. He also had a prominent role in establishing The World Soils Policy, the Tropical Forest Action Plan of 1985, and the Microbial Resource Centers.

He was the president of several Conference of Parties(COP) meetings among numerous international conferences on environmental matters that he led and spoke at.

== National career ==
Olembo was the longest serving member of the Board of Trustees of the Kenya National Parks, to which he was appointed in 1967.

While at the University of Nairobi, Olembo helped members of parliament from Western Kenya build the Harambee Institute of Technology for Western Province, which became the Western College of Arts and Applied Sciences (WECO) and which, in 2007 became the Masinde Muliro University of Science and Technology.

Olembo served as a national government advisor on environmental affairs to the Minister of Environment and Natural Resources. He developed the blueprint for what became the National Environmental Management Authority (NEMA). He was then appointed a managing trustee of the Kenya National Environment Trust Fund. He joined the Board of Directors of the Kenya Seed Company in 2003, where he served until his death in March 2005 after participating in a company strategic planning retreat.

== Recognition ==
Purdue University honored Olembo in 1994 with a Distinguished Alumni Award for Agriculture. He was also a Rockefeller Foundation Fellow, a Fellow of the Kenya Academy of Sciences (secretary) and a member of the International Genetics Federation (executive committee).
