= Wilber Otichilo =

Kenyan politician

Wilber Khasilwa Ottichilo
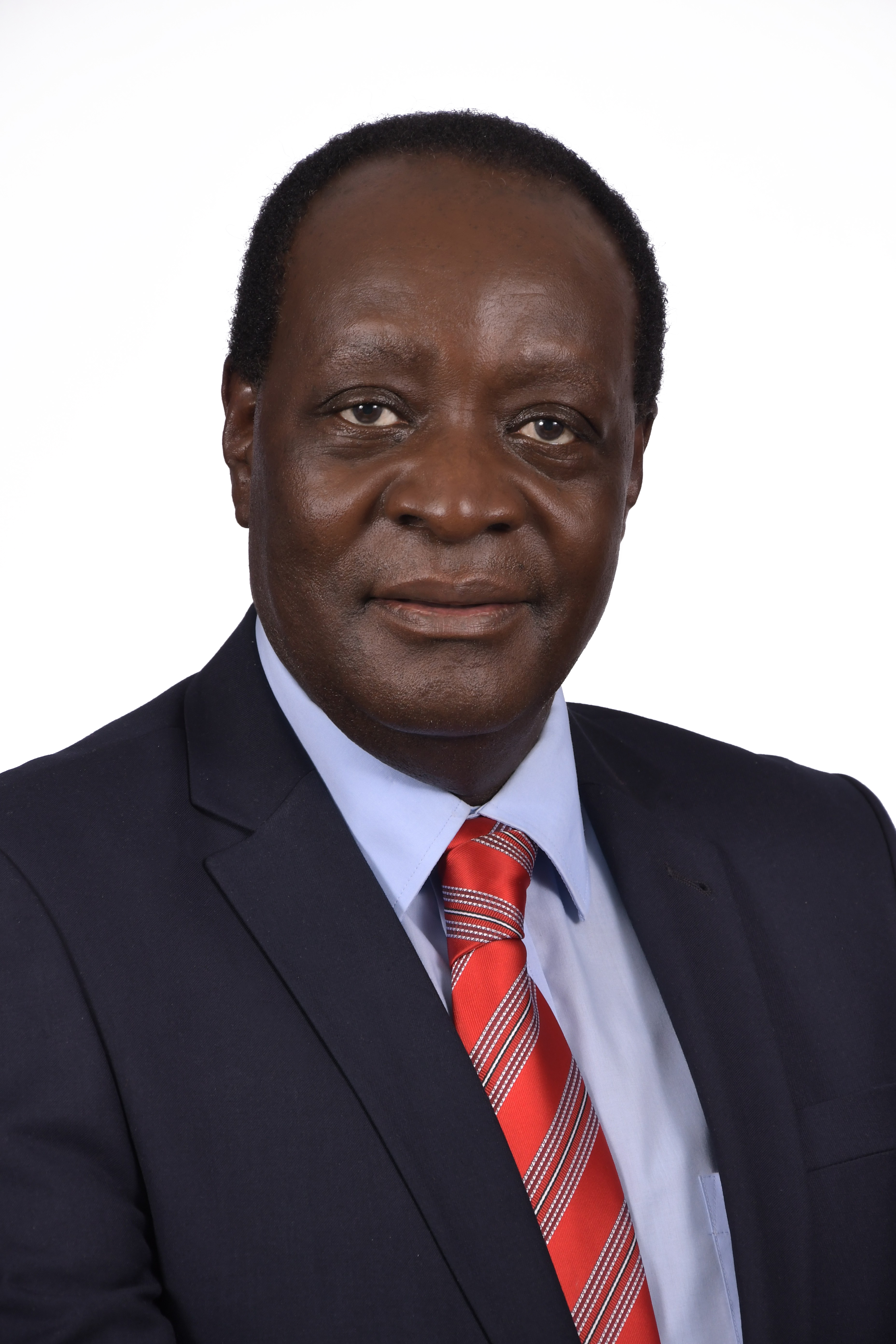
- Wilber Khasilwa Ottichilo in 2017

2nd Governor of Vihiga County
- Incumbent
- Assumed office 21 August 2017, Second Deputy Governor (2023-2027), Wilberforce Kitiezo
- Deputy: Patrick Saisi Lumumba
- Preceded by: Moses Akaranga

Personal details
- Born: 23 September 1952 (age 73)

Wilber Khasilwa Ottichilo (born September 23, 1952) is a Kenyan politician, and the current Governor of Vihiga County having trounced Hon Rev. Moses E. Akaranga of Progressive Party of Kenya ( PPK) in the 9/8/2017 General elections. He was elected Member of Parliament for Emuhaya Constituency in 2008, under Orange Democratic Party (ODM). He hails from Emanyinya village, Emusire, in Central Bunyore. On March 28, 2019, Governor Wilber Ottichilo laid a foundation for the governor’s official home which is worth Sh80 million in Endeli Village.

== Biography ==
Ottichilo was born September 23, 1952, in Emanyinya village, Emusire sublocation, central Bunyore, Kenya.

Ottichilo attended Makerere University from 1974 to 1977, the University of Nairobi from 1981 to 1983, as well as Colorado State University from 1984 to 1986. He obtained his doctorate in Natural Resource Management and Space Science from the University of Wageningen and International Institute for Earth Observation and Geoinformation, The Netherlands.

Prior to becoming the MP for Emuhaya, Ottichilo was the director general for Regional Centre for Mapping of Resources for Development (RCMRD), an agency of United Nations Economic Commission for Africa (UNECA). He was elected to parliament through a by election after the Emuhaya seat in parliament became vacant, following the election of Kenneth Marende as speaker of the National Assembly.
