= Emuhaya Constituency =

Electoral constituency of Kenya

Emuhaya
- constituency for the Parliament of Kenya
- Emuhaya Constituency within Vihiga County

- Vihiga County within Kenya
- County: Vihiga
- Population: 97,141
- Area: 89 km^{2} (34.4 sq mi)

Current constituency
- Number of members: 1
- Party: ANC
- Member of Parliament: Milemba Amboko
- Wards: 3

Emuhaya Constituency is an electoral constituency in Kenya. It is one of five constituencies in Vihiga County, in the former Western Province. The constituency was established for the 1963 elections.

The constituency was represented by Kenneth Marende of the Orange Democratic Movement (ODM) before he was elected as the Speaker of the National Assembly in January 2008. Wilbur Ottichilo became the representative in a by-election in 2008, serving for 10 years until 2017. The incumbent MNA is Omboko Milemba elected in the 2017 general election and retained the seat in 2022 elections. In 2013 the constituency was split into two, Emuhaya and Luanda. It had a population of 97,141 people in the 2019 census.

== Members of Parliament ==
Elections	MP	Party	Notes
1963	Edward Eric Khasakhala	KADU	
1969	Wilson Mukuna	KANU	One-party system
1974	Wilson Mukuna	KANU	One-party system
1979	Edward Eric Khasakhalaa	KANU	One-party system
1983	Edward Eric Khasakhala	KANU	One-party system
1988	Samuel Muhanji	KANU	One-party system
1989	Sande Mukuna	KANU	By-elections, one-party system
1992	Sheldon Muchilwa	KANU	
1997	Sheldon Muchilwa	KANU	
2002	Kenneth Marende	NARC	
2007	Kenneth Marende	ODM	Marende was elected as the speaker of parliament, vacating the MP seat
2008	Wilber Otichilo	ODM	By-elections
2013	Wilber Otichilo	ODM	
2017	Milemba Jeremiah Omboko - KUPPET	ANC	
2022	Milemba Jeremiah Omboko - KUPPET	ANC	

== Wards ==
Ward	Registered voters	Local authority
Central Bunyore	10,256	Vihiga county
Emabungo	7,016	Luanda town
North East Bunyore	13,975	Vihiga county
Luanda	8,593	Luanda town
Luanda South	5,418	Vihiga county
Mukhalakhala	6,033	Luanda town
Mwibona	4,305	Luanda town
Wemilabi	9,232	Luanda town
West Bunyore	6,234	Vihiga county
Total	71,062	
*September 2005.
