= Kenneth Marende =

6th Speaker of the National Assembly of Kenya

The Honourable Kenneth Marende (E.G.H.)
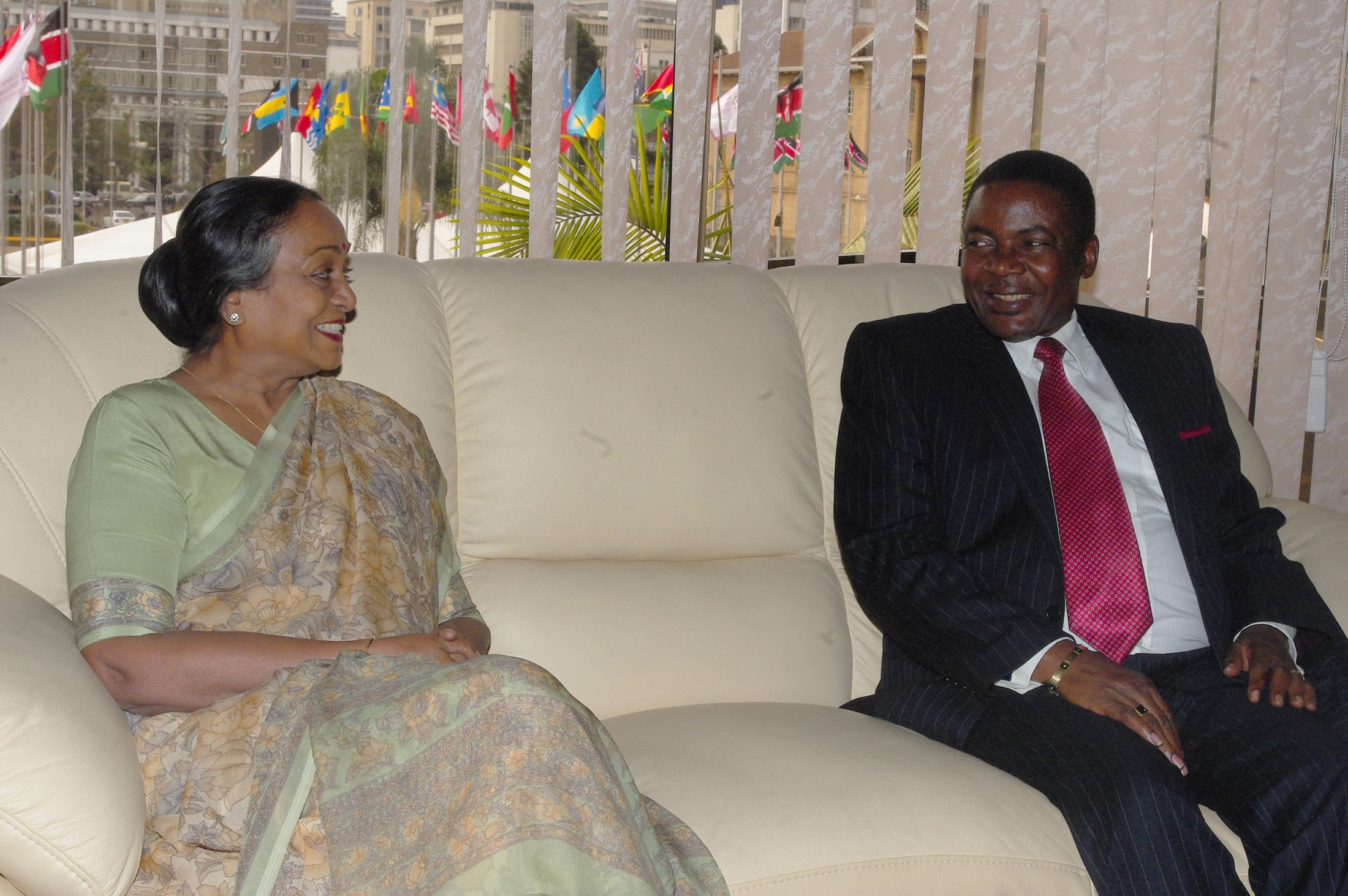
- Hon Kenneth Marende with Speaker Lok Sabha In The 56th commonwealth conference

6th Speaker of the National Assembly of Kenya
- In office 15 January 2008 – 14 January 2013
- President: Mwai Kibaki
- Preceded by: Francis ole Kaparo
- Succeeded by: Justin Muturi

Member of Parliament for Emuhaya Constituency
- In office 18 February 2003 – 22 October 2007
- Preceded by: Sheldon Muchilwa
- Succeeded by: Wilber Otichilo

Personal details
- Born: Kenneth Otiato; 7 January 1956 (age 70) Mumboha, North Nyanza District, Nyanza Province, Kenya Colony
- Party: ODM (2007–present)
- Other political affiliations: NARC (before 2007)
- Spouse: Dr. Lavender Marende (d. 2005)
- Education: University of Nairobi (LL.B); Kenya School of Law Diploma in Law (Para-Legal Studies)
- Occupation: Politician
- Profession: Lawyer

Kenneth Otiato Marende (born 7 January 1956) is the former Speaker of the National Assembly of Kenya's 10th Parliament. He was elected Speaker on January 15, 2008. Prior to his election as Speaker, Hon. Marende served as the MP for Emuhaya constituency, from 2002 to 2007. Marende was a candidate for Speaker of the National Assembly of Kenya's 13th Parliament, but was defeated by former Bungoma senator Moses Wetangula who garnered 215 votes ahead of Marende who managed 130.

== Early life ==
Marende was born in Mumboha village, Bunyore in the formerly North Nyanza District (part of it now forms Vihiga County) of former Western Province. He joined Ebusakami Primary School until 1969 when he completed his primary school education. He then proceeded to Kakamega High School and sat for his East African Certificate of Education (EACE) in 1972.

In 1974 he sat for his EAACE – East African Advanced Certificate of Education in Kagumo High School where he had been admitted for his A-Levels.

In 1975 he was admitted to the University of Nairobi where he pursued an LL.B degree. After leaving the UoN in 1978 he enrolled for Post Graduate Diploma Course at the Kenya School of Law, and was admitted to the bar in 1979.

== Legal career ==
He started working as a State Counsel in September 1979 and rose through the ranks to the level of Senior State Counsel. He left the Government service in 1984 to work with Bryson Inamdar and Bowyer Company Advocates where he was admitted into partnership in 1986 until 1988 when he joined Warender and Company Advocates.

Kenneth Marende has established himself as a leading lawyer in company law, commercial law, banking and financial services, public sector law, corporate transactions, joint ventures, and labour law.

In 2012 Marende & Nyaundi Associates – MANCO was founded by partners Kenneth Otiato Marende and Dr. Ken Nyaundi. The firm is strategically located in the ACK Garden Annex along first Ngong Avenue.

== Political career ==
In 2002, Marende joined politics, He was elected to his first term as an MP for Emuhaya Constituency on a NARC party ticket in the 2002 election. He had succeeded Hon Sheldon Muchilwa who had served as MP for the same constituency from 1997 – 2002. He retained his seat in the 2007 election, but his election as Speaker meant that his seat was left vacant, requiring a by-election in his constituency. The by-election was held in June, 2008 and was won by Wilber Otichilo of ODM.

In the 9th Parliament of Kenya , Marende was notable for supporting an amendment to the Sex offense bill that decriminalized marital rape. He made the famous quote on the floor of parliament that "Kenyans can still have sex with their partners even when they are asleep so long as they are married".

== Election of House Speaker ==
In the first round of voting, Marende, who was the candidate of the Orange Democratic Movement (ODM) for the position of Speaker, received 104 votes, while the government's candidate, Francis ole Kaparo, received 99 votes; in the second round Marende received 104 votes and Kaparo received 102. Although a two-thirds majority was required in the first two rounds, subsequently only a simple majority was required, and Marende was elected in the third round with 105 votes against 101 for Kaparo.

In April 2009, when parliament re-opened, he was forced to make a tough ruling on who should be the Leader of Government Business due to an impasse between the President and the Prime Minister. In his historic ruling, he temporarily appointed himself, based on parliament standing orders as the Chair of the House Business Committee until the impasses is resolved.

As Speaker of the National Assembly, Kenneth Otiato Marende chaired the House Business Committee, the Parliamentary Service Commission, and sat in the Standing Order, Powers and Privileges, and Pensions Committees. He was also responsible for initiating live broadcasts of the Parliamentary proceedings in the House.

His accolades and accomplishments as the man in-charge of Kenya’s legislature resulted in his appointment abroad as President of the Commonwealth Parliamentary Association.

In 2008, he was awarded the highest award any Kenyan citizen can receive, the Elder of the Golden Heart (EGH) by the President, the next year he was awarded the Jurist of the Year by the International Commission of Jurists (ICJ-K). In 2011, the Law Society of Kenya (LSK) feted Kenneth Marende with the highest award any Advocate can receive, the Advocates Lifetime Roll of Honour.

He served as the Speaker of the 10th Parliament of Kenya between 2008 and 2013. He was succeeded by Hon Justin Muturi.

== Personal life ==
Marende’s first wife was Dr Lavender Marende died in April, 2005 but they had separated before then.

His second wife was Ms Rachel Olubero, a reproductive health consultant who hails from Ebusakami in Maseno. They got married in 2002 under the Bunyore customary law. They separated in 2008, five months after Marende had become the speaker of the National Assembly (Kenya).

Marende has grown-up children with his first wife Dr. Lavender. He also has other children with Ms Rachel and Ms Jennifer.
