= Bantu Kavirondo =

Colonial name for some peoples of western Kenya

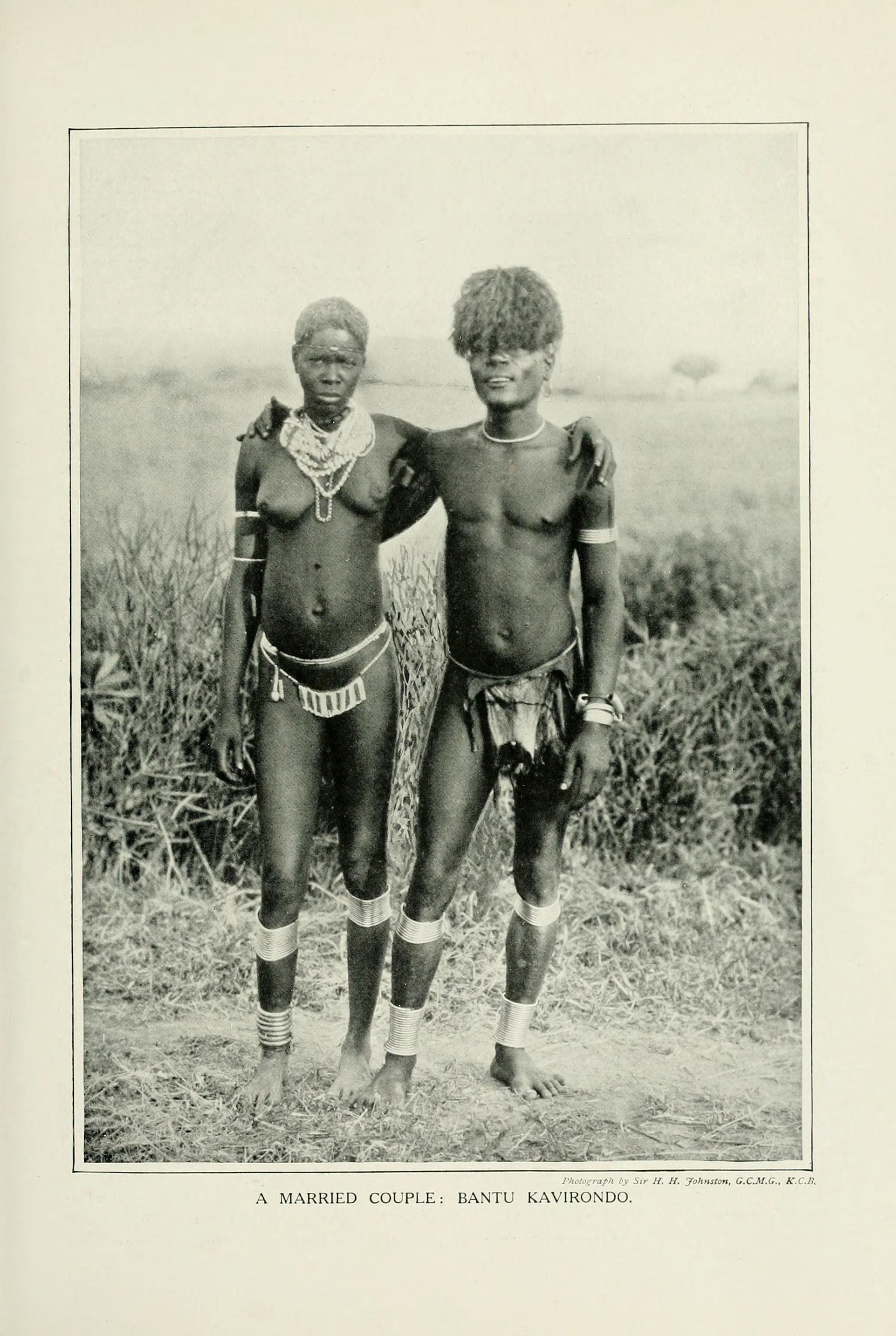
A married couple

Bantu Kavirondo is the former name given to some of the Bantu peoples of western Kenya (e.g., the Luhya and Kisii) under the early colonial regime of British East Africa. Kavirondo Gulf (Winam Gulf) and the surrounding area of "Kavirondo" derive from the same name. They were designated “Bantu" Kavirondo in contradistinction to the “Nilotic Kavirondo” (Luo).

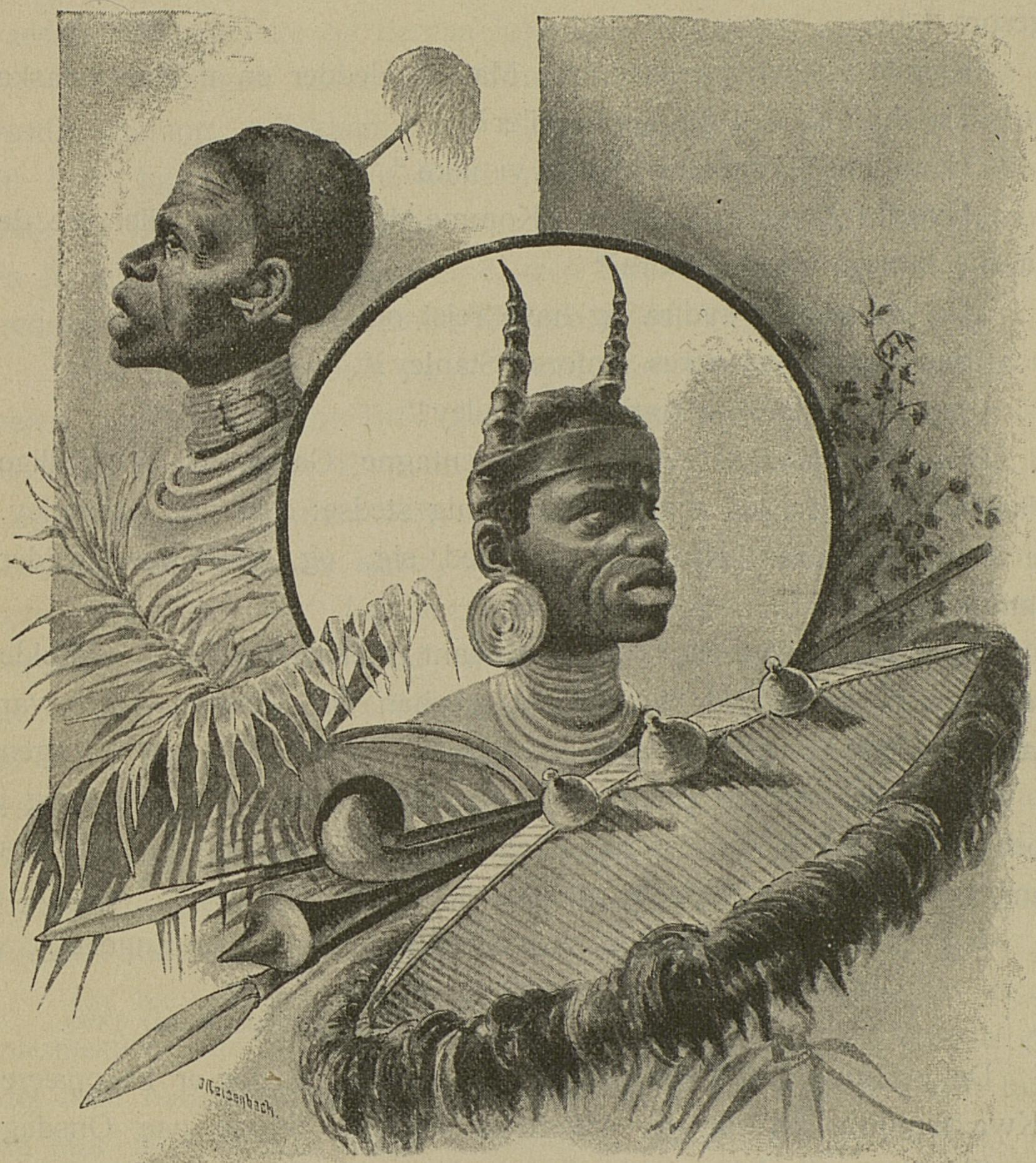
Wa-Kawirondo in the German book Die deutsche Emin-Pascha-Expedition by Carl Peters, 1891
