= Peggy Oti-Boateng =

Director of the African Academy of Sciences

- Citizenship: Ghana
- Occupations: Academician; scientist

Academic background
- Education: Kwame Nkrumah University of Science and Technology; (MSc); University of Adelaide

Academic work
- Institutions: Kwame Nkrumah University of Science and Technology; South Australian Department for Training and Employment; UNESCO; African Academy of Sciences

Peggy Oti-Boateng is a Ghanaian bio-chemist. She is the current executive director of African Academy of Sciences. She is the immediate former head of UNESCO Science Policy and Capacity Building Department. She was also a former head of the Sciences Sector for the Southern African Development Community, director of the Research Centre at the Kwame Nkrumah University of Science and Technology and former chair of the BioInnovate Africa Programme Advisory Committee (PAC).

== Education ==
Oti-Boateng received her MSc in biochemistry from Kwame Nkrumah University of Science and Technology Kumasi (Ghana) and her PhD in Food Science and Technology from Adelaide University in Australia.

== Career ==
Oti-Boateng began her career in as researcher at the Technology Consultancy Centre at the College of Engineering at KNUST in 1985. In 1989, she became a Consultant and Trainer at the South Australian Department for Training and Employment in Adelaide, Australia. Between 2005 and 2010, she was a Director of the Research Centre at the Kwame Nkrumah University of Science and Technology and in 2011, she joined the UNESCO as a Senior Programme Specialist in Kenya. In 2015, she was transferred to regional office in Harare, Zimbabwe where she became the director of the Division of Science Policy and Capacity Building in the Natural Sciences Sector. In 2022, she became the executive director of African Academy of Sciences.

She had taken over as the academy's executive after a difficult period. The academy had found that its staff and budget had grown to 60 staff controlling $250m supported by Wellcome and the Bill and Melinda Gates Foundation. Internal disagreements had led to the loss of the academy's financial supporters. She and the new governing body had to re-establish the academy's role. The academy's governing council has ten people and three of these Jane Catherine Ngila, Rajaâ Cherkaoui El Moursli and Lise Korsten (who was the President) are also women.
