= Christopher Magadza =

Zimbabwean limnologist (born 1939)

Christopher Magadza FAAS
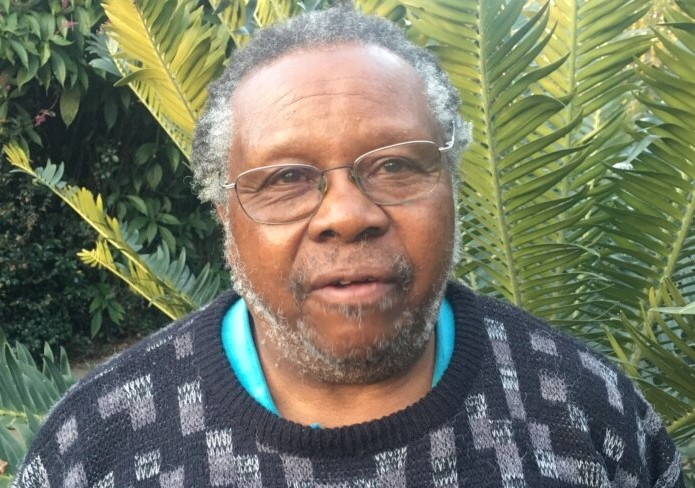
- Christopher Magadza in 2017
- Born: 1939 (age 86–87); Burma Valley, Manicaland, Zimbabwe

Academic background
- Education: University College of Rhodesia and Nyasaland (BSc, MSc); University of Auckland (PhD)
- Thesis: Comparative limnology of six hydroelectric dams on the Waikato River, New Zealand (1973)

Christopher Magadza (born 1939, Burma Valley) is a Zimbabwean limnologist and poet. He has conducted research on the Planning and Management Model of Lakes and Reservoirs (PAMOLARE) as a tool in predicting and managing changes in lakes. He is a poet who belongs to a generation of great but largely unrecognized poets, whose talents emerged almost untutored, born of tenacity, inspiration, and a desire to capture their particular colonial, social, and personal circumstances. He is a founding fellow of both the African Academy of Sciences and the Zimbabwe Academy of Sciences.

== Life and career ==
=== Early life and education ===
Christopher Magadza was born in a village in Chief Kaswas's area, now called Burma Valley, in Manicaland, Zimbabwe in 1939. His family worked as laborers on a farm and did not own it. He attended St Augustine's Mission, Penhalonga, near Mutare, and Fletcher High School in Gweru. After completing his secondary schooling, he pursued a Bachelor of Science and Master of Science at the University College of Rhodesia and Nyasaland. Magadza completed his Doctor of Philosophy degree from the University of Auckland, New Zealand. in Limnology

from the Department of Biology at the University of Zimbabwe, where he is well known for his environmental studies in zoology and climatology. He has conducted research on the Planning and Management Model of Lakes and Reservoirs (PAMOLARE) as a tool in predicting and managing changes in lakes.

Magadza was a member of the International Lake Environment Committee and the Intergovernmental Panel on Climate Change, and has conducted research on inland waters in New Zealand, Zambia, and Zimbabwe. In 2012, Magadza indicated that 50% of the water supplied to Harare is recycled urine due to man-made drought which was part of nationwide threat to wetlands. In February 2017, he advocated for Zimbabwe to ban the use of plastic which was passed as a law panning Styrofoam in June of the same year.

Although he retired from the University of Zimbabwe in 2007, he still teaches. He is actively involved in post-retirement activities, including the restoration of Lake Chivero and Lake Kariba, and the establishment of the Middle Zambezi Biosphere Reserve in the Global family of UNESCO Biosphere Reserves. Magadza has conducted studies on the basic chemical composition of inorganic elements in African lakes, the environmental biology of fishes, water quality measurements, and climate change.

Magadza was one of the founders of the African Academy of Sciences in 1985 and its vice president from 1987 until 1990.

=== Poetry ===
Magadza published several books of poetry and is recognised as a significant voice in Zimbabwean poetry. has been praised for capturing colonial, social, and personal circumstances. Magadza's poetry often reflects on the political and social context of Zimbabwe, with some of his work referencing the country's violent history and dashed hopes for change.

While specific details about the critical reception of Magadza's poetry are not provided in the search results, it is noted that his work has been published on the Poetry International Web forum, and he has been active for decades. Additionally, Magadza is described as belonging to a generation of poets whose talents emerged "almost untutored, born of tenacity, inspiration, and a desire to capture their particular colonial, social, and personal circumstances".

== Awards and honours ==
In 2007, Magadza was awarded the Nobel Peace Prize jointly with the Intergovernmental Panel on Climate Change and former vice president Al Gore for their work on climate change assessment. He is a founding fellow of the African Academy of Sciences in 1985, and the Zimbabwe Academy of Sciences.
