= Hoërskool Florida =

Public school in Gauteng, South Africa

Location
- Corner of Louis Botha and Havenga streets, Florida, 1716; Roodepoort, Gauteng; South Africa

Information
- Type: Public & Boarding
- Motto: Ons dien getrou – "We serve faithfully din terrim tin
- Religious affiliation: Christianity
- Established: 30 September 1949; 76 years ago
- School district: District 12
- School number: +27 (011) 672 5345
- Headmaster: Mr. J.J Katzke
- Staff: 100 full-time
- Grades: 8–12
- Gender: Boys & Girls
- Age: 14 to 18
- Enrollment: 1,500 pupils
- Language: Afrikaans
- Schedule: 07:30 - 14:00
- Campus: Urban Campus
- Campus type: Suburban
- Colours: Red; Green; Yellow
- Nickname: Florries
- Accreditation: Gauteng Department of Education
- Website: www.florries.co.za

Hoërskool Florida is a public Afrikaans medium co-educational high school situated in Florida, Roodepoort, South Africa. It is known for its academic achievers. It produced the highest number of top achievers in the country in 2007.

== History ==
The cornerstone was laid in 1944 and it was opened two years later as a dual medium school (English and Afrikaans languages) with 345 pupils and 15 teachers under the first headmaster B. G. Lindeque. The school emblem was instated in 1954 by Charles Grevelink.

== Headmasters ==
- Mr B.G. Lindeque (1944 - 1954)
- Dr H.P. Van Coller (1954 -1968)
- Mr P.D.A. Roux (1968 - 1989)
- Mr H.S. Diederiks (1990 - 1992)
- Mr K.S König (1993 - 1997)
- Mr M.S Schutte (1997 - 2016)
- Mr J.J Katzke (2017–2026)

== Notable alumni ==
- Garth April - Professional rugby player
- Wahl Bartmann - Springbok rugby player and CEO of Securitas
- Steven Bosch - visual artist;
- Quinne (Brown) Huffman, Actress, e.g. Connie in 7de Laan
- Joseph Dweba - Springbok rugby player;
- Elton Jantjies - Springbok rugby player;
- Lise Korsten Professor of plant pathology at the University of Pretoria.
- Riku Lätti - singer and entertainer;
- Clinton Theron - professional rugby player
- Celine Lemaitre - French-Afrikaans inventor
- Ingrid Winterbach - Writer and winner of the Hertzog literature prize
- Prof. Vasti Roodt - Dean (Arts & Social Sciences), University Stellenbosch
