= Lise Korsten =

South African Academic

- Born: c.1959
- Education: Stellenbosch University, University of Pretoria
- Occupation: academic
- Known for: first woman President of the African Academy of Sciences
- Relatives: Prof Jan Kotze (step father)

Lise Korsten is a South African Professor at the University of Pretoria who is an expert in plant pathology. In 2024, she became the first woman to lead the African Academy of Sciences.

== Life ==
Korsten was born in about 1959. She credits her step father who was a plant researcher with inspiring her interests. She attended Floridase Hoërskool in Gauteng before studying at Stellenbosch University and the University of Pretoria.

== African Academy of Sciences ==
In August 2023, she became the first woman to lead the African Academy of Sciences, succeeding Felix Dapare Dakora. As its president, she aimed to make the academy more inclusive and gender balanced. The academy should she believes be widely recognised as a leader in African sciences. She leads the academy's governing council of ten people and three of these Jane Catherine Ngila, Rajaâ Cherkaoui El Moursli and Peggy Oti-Boateng who was the executive director from 2022 are also women. She will be president until 2026. Kortsen had taken over the leadership of the academy after a difficult period. The academy had found that its staff and budget had grown to 60 staff controlling $250m supported by the Wellcome Trust and the Bill and Melinda Gates Foundation. Internal disagreements led to the loss of the academy's financial supporters. Korsten and her executive secretary had to re-establish the academy's role.

She is also a member of the Academy of Science of South Africa.

== Her research ==
Korsten's research includes the regulation of food and she takes an interest in South African Law. She has argued for a body to be appointed that would oversee food consumption. In January 2025 she spoke out warning about the hazards of street food and the need for the South African government to bring in controls. Later that year she was awarded an Honorary Doctorate from Ghent University.

In 2025, the National Science and Technology Forum recognised her work with a Lifetime Achievement Award.

== Selected publications ==
- Karoney, Edwin M.; Gokul, Jarishma K.; Siyoum, Nazareth; Molelekoa, Tintswalo; Korsten, Lise (2025-08-19). "Persistence of pathogens and biocontrol potential in the bell pepper fruit mycobiome from flowering to postharvest". Frontiers in Horticulture. 4 1656887. Frontiers Media SA. doi:10.3389/fhort.2025.1656887. ISSN 2813-3595.
- Molelekoa, Tintswalo; Karoney, Edwin M.; Siyoum, Nazareth; Gokul, Jarishma K.; Korsten, Lise (2025-08-01). "Quality and Quantity Losses of Tomatoes Grown by Small-Scale Farmers Under Different Production Systems". Horticulturae. 11 (8). MDPI AG: 884. doi:10.3390/horticulturae11080884. ISSN 2311-7524.
- Aneck-Hahn, N. H.; Van Zijl, M. C.; Quinn, L.; Swiegelaar, C.; Nhlapo, N.; de Bruin, W.; Korsten, L. (2024-09-16). "The use of in vitro bioassays and chemical screening to assess the impact of a minimally processed vegetable facility on wastewater quality". Frontiers in Toxicology. 6 1439126. Frontiers Media SA. doi:10.3389/ftox.2024.1439126. ISSN 2673-3080. PMC 11439871. PMID 39350794.
- Ogega, Obed M.; Korsten, Lise; Oti-Boateng, Peggy; Odongo, Dorine; Thorn, Jessica (2024-02-12). "How to transform Africa's food system" (PDF). Communications Earth & Environment. 5 (1) 82. Springer Science and Business Media LLC. Bibcode:2024ComEE...5...82O. doi:10.1038/s43247-024-01250-9. ISSN 2662-4435.
- Muwanga, Tracy SN; Korsten, Lise (2025-02-03). "The right to food in South Africa: A consumer protection perspective". African Human Rights Law Journal. 24 (2). Academy of Science of South Africa: 632–658. doi:10.17159/1996-2096/2024/v24n2a10. hdl:2263/101342. ISSN 1609-073X.
