= Olubukola Babalola =

Researcher and university lecturer

Olubukola Oluranti Babalola
- Born: Lagos, Nigeria
- Occupations: Academic; Researcher; Lecturer; Activist

Academic background
- Education: North-West University (NWU) Business School, South Africa, University of Ibadan

Olubukola Babalola FAAS is a Nigerian-South African professor of agriculture and a member of African Academy of sciences.

== Career ==
Babalola began her career with international Institute of Tropical Agric (Nigeria), ICIPE (Kenya). She later moved to North-West University, South Africa.

== Memberships and fellowships ==
Babalola became a fellow of the World Academy of Sciences and the African Academy of Science in 2021.

== Publications ==
- Olanrewaju OS, Oyatomi OA, Babalola OO, Abberton M (2022) Breeding potentials of Bambara groundnut for food and nutrition security in the face of climate change. Frontiers in Plant Science. 12:798993 Frontiers Media
- Fadiji AE, Babalola OO^{*}, Santoyo G, Perazzolli M (2022) The potential role of microbial biostimulants in the amelioration of climate change associated abiotic stresses on crops. Frontiers in Microbiology 12:829099 Frontiers
- Mamphogoro TP, Kamutando CN, Maboko MM, Babalola OO, and Aiyegoro OA (2022) Whole-Genome Sequence of Paenibacillus polymyxa strain SRT9.1, a Promising Plant Growth - Promoting Bacterium. Microbiology Resource Announcements 11:1. American Society for Microbiology.
