= Tholstrup =

Tholstrup is a Danish surname. Notable people with the surname include:

- Hans Tholstrup (1901–1946), Danish sailor
- Hans Tholstrup (born 1944), Australian adventurer
- Ole Tholstrup (1930–1990), Danish industrialist
- Kristina "Kiki" Tholstrup, wife of Roger Moore

== See also ==
- Thulstrup, another surname
