= Isoken Henrietta Igbinosa =

Nigerian professor and researcher

- Citizenship: Nigerian
- Occupations: Researcher, Academic
- Title: Professor

Academic background
- Education: PhD

Academic work
- Discipline: Environmental Management
- Institutions: University of Benin

Isoken Henrietta Igbinosa is a university professor and researcher with the University of Benin, Benin city, Nigeria. She specializes her research in the field of antimicrobial resistance and Food safety.

== Career ==
Igbinosa lectures at the Department of Environmental Management and Toxicology at the University of Benin, Nigeria.

== Recognition ==
Igbinosa was elected in 2024 as a fellow of the African Academy of Sciences.
