= List of 2020 Super Rugby matches =

This article contains a list of all matches to be played during the 2020 Super Rugby regular season.

The season was cancelled due to the COVID-19 pandemic. A New Zealand only competition, Super Rugby Aotearoa, set up by New Zealand Rugby Union, was created in replacement to fill the gap that Super Rugby competition left.

Other like-competitions may follow in other conferences, given eradication of the COVID-19 novel coronavirus in the host countries.

== Round 1 ==
31 January 2020
19:05 (UTC+13)

Blues	29–37	Chiefs
Try: Tony Lamborn 17'; Rieko Ioane 28', 40'; Karl Tu'inukuafe 57'; Con: Stephen Perofeta 28', 40+2', 58'; Pen: Harry Plummer 78'	Scoreboard	Try: Samisoni Taukei'aho 36', 46'; Pita Gus Sowakula 51'; Aidan Ross 65'; Solomon Alaimalo 69'; Con: Aaron Cruden 47', 52', 66'; Pen: Aaron Cruden 80+1'; Drop: Aaron Cruden 75'

Eden Park, Auckland
Attendance: 14,700
Referee: Angus Gardner (Australia)

31 January 2020
19:15 (UTC+11)

Brumbies	27–24	Reds
Try: Thomas Banks 67'; Irae Simone 5'; Tom Wright 47'; Folau Fainga'a 58'; Con: Noah Lolesio 6', 68'; Pen: Noah Lolesio 75'	Scoreboard	Try: Henry Speight 18'; Bryce Hegarty 40'; Harry Wilson 77'; Con: Bryce Hegarty 18', 40+1', 77'; Pen: Bryce Hegarty 26'

Canberra Stadium, Canberra
Attendance: 7,436
Referee: AJ Jacobs (South Africa)

31 January 2020
19:10 (UTC+2)

Sharks	23–15	Bulls
Try: S'busiso Nkosi 44'; Sanele Nohamba 79'; Con: Curwin Bosch 45', 80+1'; Pen: Curwin Bosch 7', 17', 53'	Scoreboard	Pen: Morné Steyn 2', 25', 61', 76'; Drop: Morné Steyn 38'

Kings Park Stadium, Durban
Referee: Marius van der Westhuizen (South Africa)

1 February 2020
12:45 (UTC+9)

Sunwolves	36–27	Rebels
Try: Keisuke Moriya 9'; Jaba Bregvadze 19'; Tautalatasi Tasi 26'; James Dargaville 41'; Garth April 61'; Con: Garth April 20', 28', 42', 62'; Pen: Garth April 20'	Scoreboard	Try: Anaru Rangi 23'; Dane Haylett-Petty 31'; Andrew Kellaway 65'; Andrew Deegan 76'; Con: Matt To'omua 66'; Reece Hodge 76'; Pen: Matt To'omua 15'

Level5 Stadium, Fukuoka
Attendance: 10,426
Referee: Ben O'Keeffe (New Zealand)

1 February 2020
19:05 (UTC+13)

Crusaders	43–25	Waratahs
Try: Will Jordan 16', 66'; Braydon Ennor 26', 60'; Leicester Fainga'anuku 35'; Luke Romano 75'; Con: David Havili 17', 27', 37', 67', 76'; Pen: David Havili 10'	Scoreboard	Try: Mark Nawaqanitawase 54', 58'; Alex Newsome 79'; Con: Will Harrison 55', 80'; Pen: Will Harrison 13', 20'

Trafalgar Park, Nelson
Attendance: 6,600
Referee: Paul Williams (New Zealand)

1 February 2020
15:05 (UTC+2)

Stormers	27–0	Hurricanes
Try: Sergeal Petersen 8'; Steven Kitshoff 19'; Herschel Jantjies 26'; Damian Willemse 77'; Con: Damian Willemse 21', 27'; Pen: Damian Willemse 59'	Scoreboard	Cards: Billy Proctor (yellow card) 48'; Vaea Fifita (yellow card) 59'

Newlands Stadium, Cape Town
Attendance: 18,867
Referee: Jaco Peyper (South Africa)

1 February 2020
18:40 (UTC−3)

Jaguares	38–8	Lions
Try: Domingo Miotti 10'; Matias Moroni 50', 59'; Javier Ortega Desio 69'; Agustin Creevy 74'; Con: Domingo Miotti 11', 51', 60', 70', 75'; Pen: Domingo Miotti 28'; Cards: Marcos Kremer (yellow card) 47'	Scoreboard	Try: Andre Warner 22'; Pen: Elton Jantjies 19'

José Amalfitani Stadium, Buenos Aires
Attendance: 6,820
Referee: Rasta Rasivhenge (South Africa)

Bye/s: Highlanders

== Round 2 ==
7 February 2020
19:05 (UTC+13)

Highlanders	20–42	Sharks
Try: Dillon Hunt 47'; Jona Nareki 61'; Michael Collins 63'; Con: Mitchell Hunt 48'; Pen: Mitchell Hunt 7'	Scoreboard	Try: James Venter 31'; Makazole Mapimpi 35', 39'; Aphelele Fassi 73', 80'; Con: Curwin Bosch 33', 37', 40', 74'; Pen: Curwin Bosch 12', 25', 44'

Forsyth Barr Stadium, Dunedin
Referee: Angus Gardner (Australia)

7 February 2020
19:15 (UTC+11)

Brumbies	39–26	Rebels
Try: Irae Simone 5'; Thomas Banks 12'; Tom Cusack 25'; Solomone Kata 28'; Folau Fainga'a 52'; Tom Wright 68'; Con: Noah Lolesio 6', 13', 53'; Drop: Noah Lolesio 66'	Scoreboard	Try: Angus Cottrell 38', 42'; Dane Haylett-Petty 59'; Frank Lomani 43'; Con: Matt To'omua 39'; Frank Lomani 43', 60'

Canberra Stadium, Canberra
Attendance: 7,098
Referee: Nic Berry (Australia)

8 February 2020
19:05 (UTC+13)

Chiefs	25–15	Crusaders
Try: Solomon Alaimalo 25'; Sean Wainui 57'; Te Toiroa Tahuriorangi 43'; Con: Aaron Cruden 44', 58'; Pen: Aaron Cruden 11', 79'		Try: Sevu Reece 5', 14'; Con: David Havili 15'; Pen: David Havili 47'

Waikato Stadium, Hamilton
Attendance: 13,611
Referee: Ben O'Keeffe (New Zealand)

8 February 2020
19:15 (UTC+11)

Waratahs	12–32	Blues
Try: Lalakai Foketi 39'; Mark Nawaqanitawase 61'; Con: Will Harrison 40+1'		Try: Blake Gibson 11'; Joe Marchant 42'; Mark Tele'a 44', 78', 80+1'; Con: Stephen Perofeta 43'; Harry Plummer 79'; Pen: Stephen Perofeta 25'; Cards: Hoskins Sotutu (yellow card) 56'

Newcastle International Sports Centre, Newcastle
Attendance: 7,491
Referee: AJ Jacobs (South Africa)

8 February 2020
15:05 (UTC+2)

Lions	27–20	Reds
Try: Tyrone Green 7', 16'; Marnus Schoeman 40'; Courtnall Skosan 68'; Con: Elton Jantjies 40+2', 69'; Pen: Elton Jantjies 76'		Try: Jock Campbell 10'; Tate McDermott 62'; Con: Bryce Hegarty 11', 63'; Pen: Bryce Hegarty 5', 26'; Cards: Taniela Tupou (yellow card) 40'; Josh Nasser (yellow card) 45'

Ellis Park Stadium, Johannesburg
Attendance: 4,800
Referee: Jaco Peyper (South Africa)

8 February 2020
17:15 (UTC+2)

Stormers	13–0	Bulls
Try: Siyabonga Ntubeni 37'; Seabelo Senatla 50'; Pen: Damian Willemse 3'

Newlands Stadium, Cape Town
Attendance: 27,301
Referee: Marius van der Westhuizen (South Africa)

8 February 2020
18:40 (UTC−3)

Jaguares	23–26	Hurricanes
Try: Marcos Kremer 23'; Agustin Creevy 63'; Con: Domingo Miotti 24', 65'; Pen: Domingo Miotti 16', 45', 54'		Try: Alex Fidow 71'; Jamie Booth 78'; Con: Jackson Garden-Bachop 72'; Fletcher Smith 79'; Pen: Jordie Barrett 6', 27', 34', 49'

José Amalfitani Stadium, Buenos Aires
Attendance: 8,540
Referee: Rasta Rasivhenge (South Africa)

Bye/s: Sunwolves

== Round 3 ==
14 February 2020
19:05 (UTC+13)

Blues	8–25	Crusaders
Try: Patrick Tuipulotu 6'; Pen: Harry Plummer 42'		Try: George Bridge 25'; Richie Mo'unga 45'; Jack Goodhue 58'; Con: David Havili 45', 58'; Pen: David Havili 18', 32'

Eden Park, Auckland
Attendance: 14,400
Referee: Paul Williams (New Zealand)

14 February 2020
19:15 (UTC+11)

Rebels	24–10	Waratahs
Try: Marika Koroibete 14'; Andrew Kellaway 74', 80'; Pen: Matt To'omua 6', 49', 70'		Try: Harry Johnson-Holmes 46'; Con: Will Harrison 47'; Pen: Will Harrison 12'

Melbourne Rectangular Stadium, Melbourne
Attendance: 6,500
Referee: Damon Murphy (Australia)

15 February 2020
12:45 (UTC+9)

Sunwolves	17–43	Chiefs
Try: Garth April 7'; Jaba Bregvadze 40+1'; Shogo Nakano 74'; Con: Garth April 8'		Try: Solomon Alaimalo 11'; Shaun Stevenson 15'; Brad Weber 24'; Damian McKenzie 34'; Lachlan Boshier 43'; Quinn Tupaea 78'; Kaleb Trask 80'; Con: Damian McKenzie 16', 35', 43'; Kaleb Trask 79'; Cards: Tyler Ardron (yellow card) 40'

Chichibunomiya Rugby Stadium, Tokyo
Attendance: 18,708
Referee: Angus Gardner (Australia)

15 February 2020
19:05 (UTC+13)

Hurricanes	38–22	Sharks
Try: Wes Goosen 21'; Ngani Laumape 28'; Ben Lam 44', 51'; Dane Coles 65'; Con: Jordie Barrett 23', 29', 45', 52', 66'; Pen: Jordie Barrett 7'		Try: Madosh Tambwe 13'; Tyler Paul 24'; Mzamo Majola 21'; Con: Boeta Chamberlain 14'; Sanele Nohamba 26'; Pen: Sanele Nohamba 35'

Wellington Regional Stadium, Wellington
Attendance: 11,040
Referee: Ben O'Keeffe (New Zealand)

15 February 2020
19:15 (UTC+11)

Brumbies	22–23	Highlanders
Try: Folau Fainga'a 12', 30', 68'; Con: Noah Lolesio 31'; Ryan Lonergan 69'; Pen: Ryan Lonergan 75'; Cards: Murray Douglas (yellow card) 80+3'		Try: Jona Nareki 32'; Teariki Ben-Nicholas 80+3'; Con: Josh Ioane 33', 80+4'; Pen: Josh Ioane 5', 39', 43'; Cards: Sio Tomkinson (yellow card) 45'

Canberra Stadium, Canberra
Attendance: 7,270
Referee: Nic Berry (Australia)

15 February 2020
15:05 (UTC+2)

Lions	30–33	Stormers
Try: Andries Coetzee 26'; Courtnall Skosan 30'; Elton Jantjies 68'; Dan Kriel 73'; Con: Elton Jantjies 31', 69'; Pen: Elton Jantjies 8', 78'		Try: Juarno Augustus 12'; Godlen Masimla 19'; Sergeal Petersen 41'; Ruhan Nel 80+2'; Con: Damian Willemse 13'; Jean-Luc du Plessis 80+3'; Pen: Damian Willemse 37', 40+2', 48'

Ellis Park Stadium, Johannesburg
Referee: Jaco Peyper (South Africa)

15 February 2020
18:40 (UTC−3)

Jaguares	43–27	Reds
Try: Julián Montoya 24', 43', 63'; Emiliano Boffelli 40+1'; Santiago Socino 68'; Tomas Cubelli 71'; Con: Domingo Miotti 25', 44', 65', 70'; Tomás Albornoz 72'; Pen: Domingo Miotti 48'		Try: Tate McDermott 11'; Liam Wright 19'; Chris Feauai-Sautia 29', 35'; Con: Jock Campbell 12', 20'; Pen: Jock Campbell 53'; Cards: Liam Wright (yellow card) 63'

José Amalfitani Stadium, Buenos Aires
Attendance: 8,100
Referee: Federico Anselmi (Argentina)

Bye/s: Bulls

== Round 4 ==
21 February 2020
19:05 (UTC+13)

Crusaders	33–13	Highlanders
Try: Codie Taylor 14'; Tom Christie 20'; Braydon Ennor 26'; George Bridge 32'; Sione Havili 74'; Con: David Havili 15'; Bryn Hall 27', 34'; Mitchell Drummond 75'		Try: Michael Collins 23'; Jona Nareki 63'; Pen: Josh Ioane 6'; Cards: Shannon Frizell (yellow card) 46'

Rugby League Park, Christchurch
Referee: Mike Fraser (New Zealand)

22 February 2020
14:45 (UTC+11)

Rebels	24–36	Sharks
Try: Marika Koroibete 9'; Isi Naisarani 48'; Anaru Rangi 79'; Con: Andrew Deegan 11', 50', 79'; Pen: Andrew Deegan 28'		Try: Makazole Mapimpi 5', 64'; Andre Esterhuizen 16'; Madosh Tambwe 40'; Curwin Bosch 72'; Con: Curwin Bosch 6', 40+1', 65', 73'; Pen: Curwin Bosch 32'; Cards: Kerron van Vuuren (yellow card) 42'; Madosh Tambwe (yellow card) 46'

Eureka Stadium, Ballarat
Referee: AJ Jacobs (South Africa)

22 February 2020
19:05 (UTC+13)

Chiefs	14–26	Brumbies
Try: Aaron Cruden 48'; Anton Lienert-Brown 55'; Con: Damian McKenzie 49', 56'		Try: Tom Banks 9'; Solomone Kata 15'; Pete Samu 37', 42'; Con: Noah Lolesio 11', 38', 44'; Cards: James Slipper (yellow card) 53'

Waikato Stadium, Hamilton
Attendance: 10,408
Referee: Brendon Pickerill (New Zealand)

22 February 2020
18:15 (UTC+10)

Reds	64–5	Sunwolves
Try: Liam Wright 5'; Taniela Tupou 7'; Hunter Paisami 15'; Tate McDermott 29', 44'; Lukhan Salakaia-Loto 34'; James O'Connor 40+1'; Hamish Stewart 48'; Josh Nasser 68'; Isaac Lucas 72'; Con: Jock Campbell 8', 17', 30', 45', 49', 69'; Bryce Hegarty 73'		Try: Siosaia Fifita 65'; Cards: Ben Te'o (yellow card) 32'

Lang Park, Brisbane
Attendance: 11,798
Referee: Nic Berry (Australia)

22 February 2020
15:05 (UTC+2)

Stormers	17–7	Jaguares
Try: Herschel Jantjies 45'; Ruhan Nel 53'; Con: Damian Willemse 47', 54'; Pen: Damian Willemse 13'; Cards: Frans Malherbe (yellow card) 16'		Try: Rodrigo Bruni 66'; Con: Domingo Miotti 67'

Newlands Stadium, Cape Town
Referee: Rasta Rasivhenge (South Africa)

22 February 2020
17:15 (UTC+2)

Bulls	21–23	Blues
Try: Morné Steyn 40+2'; Jeandre Rudolph 72'; Con: Manie Libbok 73'; Pen: Morné Steyn 8', 15', 45'; Cards: Andries Ferreira (yellow card) 20'; Burger Odendaal (yellow card) 25'		Try: Mark Tele'a 32'; Tom Robinson 53'; Stephen Perofeta 59'; Con: Otere Black 54'; Pen: Otere Black 17', 80+1'; Cards: Jonathan Ruru (yellow card) 39'; Hoskins Sotutu (yellow card) 69'

Loftus Versfeld Stadium, Pretoria
Referee: Marius van der Westhuizen (South Africa)

Bye/s: Hurricanes, Lions, Waratahs

== Round 5 ==
28 February 2020
19:05 (UTC+13)

Highlanders	22–28	Rebels
Try: Josh McKay 24'; Aaron Smith 40'; Scott Gregory 63'; Con: Josh Ioane 25', 40+1'; Pen: Josh Ioane 68'; Cards: Scott Gregory (yellow card) 65'; Jona Nareki (yellow card) 79'		Try: Bill Meakes 8'; Anaru Rangi 13'; Andrew Kellaway 21', 52'; Con: Matt To'omua 9', 14', 22', 53'; Cards: Bill Meakes (yellow card) 68'

Forsyth Barr Stadium, Dunedin
Referee: Paul Williams (New Zealand)

28 February 2020
19:15 (UTC+11)

Waratahs	29–17	Lions
Try: Angus Bell 3'; Lachlan Swinton 10'; Jack Dempsey 17'; James Ramm 55'; Tetera Faulkner 77'; Con: Will Harrison 4', 12'; Cards: Lachlan Swinton (yellow card) 22'		Try: Marnus Schoeman 24', 64'; Con: Andries Coetzee 25'; Elton Jantjies 64'; Pen: Elton Jantjies 15'; Cards: Ruben Schoeman (yellow card) 9'

Western Sydney Stadium, Sydney
Attendance: 7,584
Referee: Angus Gardner (Australia)

29 February 2020
16:45 (UTC+13)

Hurricanes	62–15	Sunwolves
Try: Kobus van Wyk 12', 29', 56'; Chase Tiatia 19', 25'; Ben Lam 41'; TJ Perenara 43'; Gareth Evans 46'; Ngani Laumape 62'; Vince Aso 77'; Con: Fletcher Smith 13', 21', 26', 30', 47'; Chase Tiatia 63'		Try: Michael Stolberg 4'; Siosaia Fifita 66'; Con: Jumpei Ogura 5'; Pen: Jumpei Ogura 17'

McLean Park, Napier
Referee: Federico Anselmi (Argentina)

29 February 2020
18:15 (UTC+10)

Reds	23–33	Sharks
Try: Henry Speight 18'; Tate McDermott 51'; Ed Craig 80+8'; Con: Jock Campbell 80+10'; Pen: Jock Campbell 4', 29'		Try: Kerron van Vuuren 15'; Dylan Richardson 45'; Lukhanyo Am 70'; Madosh Tambwe 75'; Con: Curwin Bosch 46', 71'; Pen: Curwin Bosch 6', 56', 61'; Cards: Lwazi Mvovo (yellow card) 80+7'

Lang Park, Brisbane
Attendance: 13,323
Referee: Brendon Pickerill (New Zealand)

29 February 2020
15:05 (UTC+2)

Stormers	14–33	Blues
Try: Juarno Augustus 26'; Sergeal Petersen 38'; Con: Damian Willemse 27', 39'		Try: Joe Marchant 7', 40+1'; Dalton Papali'i 21'; Con: Otere Black 8', 23', 40+2'; Pen: Otere Black 3', 13', 55', 63'; Cards: Mark Tele'a (yellow card) 28'

Newlands Stadium, Cape Town
Referee: Jaco Peyper (South Africa)

29 February 2020
17:15 (UTC+2)

Bulls	24–39	Jaguares
Try: Marco van Staden 10'; Warrick Gelant 34'; Cornal Hendricks 42'; Con: Morné Steyn 12', 36', 43'; Pen: Morné Steyn 55'; Cards: Johnny Kotze (yellow card) 48'		Try: Emiliano Boffelli 4', 50'; Rodrigo Bruni 17'; Guido Petti 37'; Matias Moroni 40'; Santiago Socino 72'; Con: Joaquín Díaz Bonilla 38', 40+1', 52'; Pen: Joaquín Díaz Bonilla 58'; Cards: Joaquín Díaz Bonilla (yellow card) 64'

Loftus Versfeld Stadium, Pretoria
Referee: Ben O'Keeffe (New Zealand)

Bye/s: Brumbies, Chiefs, Crusaders

== Round 6 ==
6 March 2020
14:45 (UTC+11)

Sunwolves	14–47	Brumbies
Try: Efi Ma'afu 36'; Michael Stolberg 73'; Con: Garth April 37'; Jumpei Ogura 74'		Try: Ryan Lonergan 10'; Will Miller 19'; Rob Valetini 40+1'; Toni Pulu 46'; Tevita Kuridrani 54'; Solomone Kata 56'; Joe Powell 80+1'; Con: Ryan Lonergan 12', 20', 40+2', 47', 55'; Reesjan Pasitoa 80+2'

Wollongong Showground, Wollongong
Referee: Federico Anselmi (Argentina)

6 March 2020
19:05 (UTC+13)

Crusaders	24–20	Reds
Try: Joe Moody 11'; George Bridge 44'; Leicester Fainga'anuku 53'; Con: Richie Mo'unga 12', 45', 55'; Pen: Richie Mo'unga 20'; Cards: Tom Sanders (yellow card) 40+1'		Try: Chris Feauai-Sautia 15'; Harry Wilson 26'; Taniela Tupou 47'; Henry Speight 72'

Rugby League Park, Christchurch
Referee: Rasta Rasivhenge (South Africa)

6 March 2020
19:15 (UTC+11)

Waratahs	14–51	Chiefs
Try: Kurtley Beale 26'; Jack Dempsey 32'; Con: Will Harrison 27', 33'		Try: Shaun Stevenson 21'; Brad Weber 43', 45'; Sean Wainui 52'; Lachlan Boshier 61'; Solomon Alaimalo 63'; Anton Lienert-Brown 79'; Con: Aaron Cruden 22', 43', 53'; Kaleb Trask 62', 66'; Pen: Aaron Cruden 2', 7'

Wollongong Showground, Wollongong
Attendance: 7,596
Referee: Angus Gardner (Australia)

7 March 2020
19:05 (UTC+13)

Hurricanes	15–24	Blues
Try: Ben Lam 2'; Kobus van Wyk 63'; Con: Jordie Barrett 65'; Pen: Jordie Barrett 39'; Cards: Tyrel Lomax (red card) 47'; Vaea Fifita (yellow card) 68'; Jordie Barrett (yellow card) 74'		Try: Akira Ioane 37'; Mark Tele'a 56'; Penalty try 74'; Con: Otere Black 37', 57'; Pen: Otere Black 69'

Wellington Regional Stadium, Wellington
Attendance: 13,778
Referee: Mike Fraser (New Zealand)

7 March 2020
19:15 (UTC+11)

Rebels	37–17	Lions
Try: Andrew Kellaway 19', 78'; Richard Hardwick 29'; Isi Naisarani 43'; Dane Haylett-Petty 54'; Con: Matt To'omua 30', 44', 55'; Pen: Matt To'omua 13', 65'; Cards: Marika Koroibete (yellow card) 26'; Tom English (yellow card) 40'		Try: Jamba Ulengo 34'; Sti Sithole 73'; Con: Elton Jantjies 35', 74'; Pen: Elton Jantjies 40+1'

Melbourne Rectangular Stadium, Melbourne
Referee: James Doleman (New Zealand)

7 March 2020
15:05 (UTC+2)

Sharks	33–19	Jaguares
Try: Hyron Andrews 4'; Sikhumbuzo Notshe 9'; Andre Esterhuizen 27'; Kerron van Vuuren 52'; Con: Curwin Bosch 11', 29'; Pen: Curwin Bosch 23', 44', 48'; Cards: Aphelele Fassi (yellow card) 73'		Try: Santiago Carreras 18'; Joaquin Tuculet 36'; Sebastián Cancelliere 76'; Con: Joaquín Díaz Bonilla 36'; Domingo Miotti 77'; Cards: Gonzalo Bertranou (yellow card) 61'

Kings Park Stadium, Durban
Referee: Marius van der Westhuizen (South Africa)

7 March 2020
17:15 (UTC+2)

Bulls	38–13	Highlanders
Try: Jaco Visagie 15'; Warrick Gelant 48'; Rosko Specman 56', 61', 72'; Cornal Hendricks 80'; Con: Manie Libbok 50', 57', 63'; Morné Steyn 74'		Try: Josh Ioane 10'; Con: Josh Ioane 12'; Pen: Josh Ioane 35', 43'

Loftus Versfeld Stadium, Pretoria
Referee: AJ Jacobs (South Africa)

Bye/s: Stormers

== Round 7 ==
13 March 2020
19:05 (UTC+13)

Chiefs	24–27	Hurricanes
Try: Lachlan Boshier 21'; Tumua Manu 54'; Shaun Stevenson 58'; Con: Damian McKenzie 22', 56', 60'; Pen: Damian McKenzie 16'		Try: Ben Lam 9'; Fletcher Smith 29'; Asafo Aumua 71'; Con: Jordie Barrett 10', 30', 72'; Pen: Jordie Barrett 62', 80+4'; Cards: TJ Perenara (yellow card) 57'

Waikato Stadium, Hamilton
Referee: Jaco Peyper (South Africa)

14 March 2020
16:25 (UTC+13)

Blues	43–10	Lions
Try: Rieko Ioane 8', 44'; Stephen Perofeta 31'; Penalty try 38'; Gerard Cowley-Tuioti 49'; Hoskins Sotutu 63'; Con: Otere Black 32', 45', 50'; Harry Plummer 64'; Pen: Otere Black 22'		Try: Dan Kriel 16'; Con: Elton Jantjies 18'; Pen: Elton Jantjies 35'; Cards: Ruan Vermaak (yellow card) 39'

Eden Park, Auckland
Attendance: 9,700
Referee: Marius van der Westhuizen (South Africa)

14 March 2020
15:35 (UTC+10)

Sunwolves	14–49	Crusaders
Try: Ben Hyne 31'; Garth April 54'; Con: Garth April 32', 55'		Try: Tom Christie 19'; Sevu Reece 36', 57'; Luke Romano 42'; Sione Havili 63'; Braydon Ennor 76'; Fergus Burke 80+1'; Con: Brett Cameron 20', 37', 43', 58', 64'; Fergus Burke 77', 80+2'; Cards: Sevu Reece (yellow card) 69'

Lang Park, Brisbane
Referee: Brendon Pickerill (New Zealand)

14 March 2020
18:15 (UTC+10)

Reds	41–17	Bulls
Try: Liam Wright 29'; Isaac Lucas 38'; Lukhan Salakaia-Loto 41'; Alex Mafi 69'; Harry Hoopert 72'; Taniela Tupou 79'; Con: Bryce Hegarty 30', 40', 73', 80'; Pen: Bryce Hegarty 63'; Cards: Chris Feauai-Sautia (yellow card) 16'		Try: Embrose Papier 8'; Rosko Specman 13'; Warrick Gelant 17'; Con: Manie Libbok 9'

Lang Park, Brisbane
Attendance: 7,335
Referee: Mike Fraser (New Zealand)

14 March 2020
15:05 (UTC+2)

Sharks	24–14	Stormers
Try: Aphelele Fassi 26'; Makazole Mapimpi 79'; Con: Curwin Bosch 28'; Pen: Curwin Bosch 50', 69', 75'; Drop: Curwin Bosch 40+3'		Try: Herschel Jantjies 28'; Paul de Wet 61'; Con: Damian Willemse 29', 62'; Cards: Johan du Toit (yellow card) 1'

Kings Park Stadium, Durban
Referee: AJ Jacobs (South Africa)

14 March 2020
18:40 (UTC−3)

Jaguares	Cancelled	Highlanders

José Amalfitani Stadium, Buenos Aires
Referee: TBC

15 March 2020
16:05 (UTC+11)

Brumbies	47–14	Waratahs
Try: Solomone Kata 18', 25'; Cadeyrn Neville 34'; Joe Powell 45'; Tom Wright 58', 73'; Tom Banks 80+1'; Con: Noah Lolesio 19', 27', 36', 46'; Ryan Lonergan 75'; Tom Banks 80+3'; Cards: Darcy Swain (yellow card) 68'		Try: Rob Simmons 12'; Mark Nawaqanitawase 22'; Con: Will Harrison 14', 23'; Cards: Jack Dempsey (yellow card) 57'

Canberra Stadium, Canberra
Attendance: 8,167
Referee: Rasta Rasivhenge (South Africa)

Bye/s: Rebels

== Round 8 ==
20 March 2020
19:05 (UTC+13)

Crusaders	Cancelled	Hurricanes

Rugby League Park, Christchurch
Referee: TBC

20 March 2020
19:15 (UTC+11)

Rebels	Cancelled	Sunwolves

Melbourne Rectangular Stadium, Melbourne
Referee: TBC

21 March 2020
16:45 (UTC+13)

Highlanders	Cancelled	Lions

Forsyth Barr Stadium, Dunedin
Referee: TBC

21 March 2020
19:35 (UTC+13)

Blues	Cancelled	Brumbies

Eden Park, Auckland
Referee: TBC

21 March 2020
19:45 (UTC+11)

Waratahs	Cancelled	Bulls

Scully Park, Tamworth
Referee: TBC

21 March 2020
15:05 (UTC+2)

Sharks	Cancelled	Chiefs

Kings Park Stadium, Durban
Referee: TBC

21 March 2020
17:15 (UTC−2)

Jaguares	Cancelled	Stormers

José Amalfitani Stadium, Buenos Aires
Referee: TBC

Bye/s: Reds

== Round 9 ==
27 March 2020
19:05 (UTC+13)

Hurricanes	Cancelled	Bulls

Wellington Regional Stadium, Wellington
Referee: TBC

27 March 2020
18:15 (UTC+10)

Reds	Cancelled	Brumbies

Lang Park, Brisbane
Referee: TBC

28 March 2020
19:05 (UTC+13)

Highlanders	Cancelled	Crusaders

Forsyth Barr Stadium, Dunedin
Referee: TBC

28 March 2020
19:15 (UTC+11)

Waratahs	Cancelled	Sunwolves

TBC
Referee: TBC

28 March 2020
15:05 (UTC+2)

Lions	Cancelled	Chiefs

Ellis Park Stadium, Johannesburg
Referee: TBC

28 March 2020
17:15 (UTC+2)

Stormers	Cancelled	Rebels

Newlands Stadium, Cape Town
Referee: TBC

Bye/s: Blues, Jaguares, Sharks

== Round 10 ==
3 April 2020
19:05 (UTC+13)

Crusaders	Cancelled	Blues

Rugby League Park, Christchurch
Referee: TBC

4 April 2020
19:05 (UTC+13)

Chiefs	Cancelled	Bulls

Waikato Stadium, Hamilton
Referee: TBC

4 April 2020
19:15 (UTC+11)

Brumbies	Cancelled	Hurricanes

Canberra Stadium, Canberra
Referee: TBC

4 April 2020
15:05 (UTC+2)

Stormers	Cancelled	Waratahs

Newlands Stadium, Cape Town
Referee: TBC

4 April 2020
17:15 (UTC+2)

Lions	Cancelled	Sharks

Ellis Park Stadium, Johannesburg
Referee: TBC

4 April 2020
18:40 (UTC−3)

Jaguares	Cancelled	Rebels

José Amalfitani Stadium, Buenos Aires
Referee: TBC

5 April 2020
14:15 (UTC+9)

Sunwolves	Cancelled	Reds

TBC
Referee: TBC

Bye/s: Highlanders

== Round 11 ==
10 April 2020
17:00 (UTC+12)

Highlanders	Cancelled	Chiefs

Forsyth Barr Stadium, Dunedin
Referee: TBC

11 April 2020
16:45 (UTC+12)

Blues	Cancelled	Hurricanes

Eden Park, Auckland
Referee: TBC

11 April 2020
19:15 (UTC+10)

Reds	Cancelled	Rebels

Lang Park, Brisbane
Referee: TBC

11 April 2020
15:05 (UTC+2)

Sharks	Cancelled	Waratahs

Kings Park Stadium, Durban
Referee: TBC

11 April 2020
17:15 (UTC+2)

Bulls	Cancelled	Lions

Loftus Versfeld Stadium, Pretoria
Referee: TBC

12 April 2020
16:05 (UTC+10)

Brumbies	Cancelled	Jaguares

Canberra Stadium, Canberra
Referee: TBC

Bye/s: Crusaders, Stormers, Sunwolves

== Round 12 ==
17 April 2020
19:05 (UTC+12)

Hurricanes	Cancelled	Highlanders

Wellington Regional Stadium, Wellington
Referee: TBC

17 April 2020
19:15 (UTC+10)

Rebels	Cancelled	Crusaders

Melbourne Rectangular Stadium, Melbourne
Referee: TBC

18 April 2020
16:45 (UTC+12)

Blues	Cancelled	Jaguares

Okara Park, Whangarei
Referee: TBC

18 April 2020
19:15 (UTC+10)

Waratahs	Cancelled	Reds

Western Sydney Stadium, Sydney
Referee: TBC

18 April 2020
15:05 (UTC+2)

Lions	Cancelled	Sunwolves

Ellis Park Stadium, Johannesburg
Referee: TBC

18 April 2020
17:15 (UTC+2)

Stormers	Cancelled	Sharks

Newlands Stadium, Cape Town
Referee: TBC

Bye/s: Brumbies, Bulls, Chiefs

== Round 13 ==
24 April 2020
19:05 (UTC+12)

Crusaders	Cancelled	Jaguares

Rugby League Park, Christchurch
Referee: TBC

24 April 2020
19:15 (UTC+10)

Rebels	Cancelled	Blues

Melbourne Rectangular Stadium, Melbourne
Referee: TBC

25 April 2020
19:05 (UTC+12)

Chiefs	Cancelled	Stormers

Navigation Homes Stadium, Pukekohe
Referee: TBC

25 April 2020
15:05 (UTC+2)

Sharks	Cancelled	Brumbies

Kings Park Stadium, Durban
Referee: TBC

25 April 2020
17:15 (UTC+2)

Bulls	Cancelled	Sunwolves

Loftus Versfeld Stadium, Pretoria
Referee: TBC

26 April 2020
16:05 (UTC+10)

Reds	Cancelled	Highlanders

Lang Park, Brisbane
Referee: TBC

Bye/s: Hurricanes, Lions, Waratahs

== Round 14 ==
1 May 2020
19:05 (UTC+12)

Hurricanes	Cancelled	Chiefs

Wellington Regional Stadium, Wellington
Referee: TBC

2 May 2020
16:45 (UTC+12)

Crusaders	Cancelled	Stormers

Rugby League Park, Christchurch
Referee: TBC

2 May 2020
19:05 (UTC+12)

Highlanders	Cancelled	Blues

Forsyth Barr Stadium, Dunedin
Referee: TBC

2 May 2020
19:15 (UTC+10)

Waratahs	Cancelled	Rebels

Brookvale Oval, Sydney
Referee: TBC

2 May 2020
19:25 (UTC+8)

Sunwolves	Cancelled	Jaguares

TBC
Referee: TBC

2 May 2020
15:35 (UTC+2)

Sharks	Cancelled	Lions

Kings Park Stadium, Durban
Referee: TBC

2 May 2020
17:45 (UTC+2)

Bulls	Cancelled	Brumbies

Loftus Versfeld Stadium, Pretoria
Referee: TBC

Bye/s: Reds

== Round 15 ==
8 May 2020
19:05 (UTC+12)

Hurricanes	Cancelled	Crusaders

Wellington Regional Stadium, Wellington
Referee: TBC

8 May 2020
19:00 (UTC+9)

Sunwolves	Cancelled	Waratahs

TBC
Referee: TBC

9 May 2020
16:45 (UTC+12)

Chiefs	Cancelled	Highlanders

Waikato Stadium, Hamilton
Referee: TBC

9 May 2020
19:05 (UTC+12)

Blues	Cancelled	Reds

Eden Park, Auckland
Referee: TBC

9 May 2020
19:15 (UTC+10)

Brumbies	Cancelled	Stormers

Manuka Oval, Griffith
Referee: TBC

9 May 2020
15:05 (UTC+2)

Lions	Cancelled	Bulls

Ellis Park Stadium, Johannesburg
Referee: TBC

9 May 2020
16:40 (UTC−3)

Jaguares	Cancelled	Sharks

José Amalfitani Stadium, Buenos Aires
Referee: TBC

Bye/s: Rebels

== Round 16 ==
15 May 2020
19:05 (UTC+12)

Chiefs	Cancelled	Blues

Waikato Stadium, Hamilton
Referee: TBC

15 May 2020
19:15 (UTC+10)

Rebels	Cancelled	Brumbies

Melbourne Rectangular Stadium, Melbourne
Referee: TBC

16 May 2020
13:45 (UTC+9)

Sunwolves	Cancelled	Stormers

TBC
Referee: TBC

16 May 2020
19:05 (UTC+12)

Highlanders	Cancelled	Hurricanes

Forsyth Barr Stadium, Dunedin
Referee: TBC

16 May 2020
19:15 (UTC+10)

Reds	Cancelled	Waratahs

Lang Park, Brisbane
Referee: TBC

16 May 2020
15:05 (UTC+2)

Lions	Cancelled	Crusaders

Ellis Park Stadium, Johannesburg
Referee: TBC

16 May 2020
17:15 (UTC+2)

Bulls	Cancelled	Sharks

Loftus Versfeld Stadium, Pretoria
Referee: TBC

Bye/s: Jaguares

== Round 17 ==
22 May 2020
19:05 (UTC+12)

Chiefs	Cancelled	Rebels

Waikato Stadium, Hamilton
Referee: TBC

22 May 2020
19:15 (UTC+10)

Reds	Cancelled	Hurricanes

Lang Park, Brisbane
Referee: TBC

23 May 2020
19:05 (UTC+12)

Highlanders	Cancelled	Sunwolves

Forsyth Barr Stadium, Dunedin
Referee: TBC

23 May 2020
19:15 (UTC+10)

Waratahs	Cancelled	Brumbies

Western Sydney Stadium, Sydney
Referee: TBC

23 May 2020
15:05 (UTC+2)

Sharks	Cancelled	Crusaders

Kings Park Stadium, Durban
Referee: TBC

23 May 2020
15:35 (UTC+2)

Stormers	Cancelled	Lions

Newlands Stadium, Cape Town
Referee: TBC

23 May 2020
17:45 (UTC+2)

Jaguares	Cancelled	Bulls

José Amalfitani Stadium, Buenos Aires
Referee: TBC

Bye/s: Blues

== Round 18 ==
29 May 2020
19:05 (UTC+12)

Blues	Cancelled	Highlanders

Eden Park, Auckland
Referee: TBC

29 May 2020
19:15 (UTC+10)

Brumbies	Cancelled	Sunwolves

Canberra Stadium, Canberra
Referee: TBC

30 May 2020
16:45 (UTC+12)

Hurricanes	Cancelled	Waratahs

Wellington Regional Stadium, Wellington
Referee: TBC

30 May 2020
19:05 (UTC+12)

Crusaders	Cancelled	Chiefs

Rugby League Park, Christchurch
Referee: TBC

30 May 2020
19:15 (UTC+10)

Rebels	Cancelled	Reds

Melbourne Rectangular Stadium, Melbourne
Referee: TBC

30 May 2020
15:05 (UTC+2)

Lions	Cancelled	Jaguares

Ellis Park Stadium, Johannesburg
Referee: TBC

30 May 2020
17:45 (UTC+2)

Bulls	Cancelled	Stormers

Loftus Versfeld Stadium, Pretoria
Referee: TBC

Bye/s: Sharks

== See also ==
- 2020 Super Rugby season
