= Thulstrup =

Thulstrup is a surname. Notable people with this surname include:

- Erik Thulstrup (died 2019), Danish chemist
- Magnus Andreas Thulstrup (1769–1844), Norwegian surgeon
- Thure de Thulstrup (1848–1930), American illustrator

== See also ==
- Tholstrup, a surname
