= Viness Pillay =

South African pharmaceutical professor

Professor Viness Pillay FAAS
- Born: 1970
- Died: 24 July 2020 (aged 49–50)
- Citizenship: South Africa
- Occupation: Pharmacist
- Children: 1
- Awards: National Research Foundation (NRF)

Academic background
- Education: University of the Witwatersrand, Johannesburg

Viness Pillay FAAS (1970–2020) was a South African professor of pharmacy at the University of the Witwatersrand in Johannesburg. He was the Director of the Wits Advanced Drug Delivery Platform (WADDP), a member of African Academy of Sciences, Academy of Translational Medicine Professionals (ATMP) and a beneficiary of the 2013 Olusegun Obasanjo Innovative Award for developing the RapiDiss Wafer Technology as an innovative way to provide effective anti-retroviral (ARV) drug therapy to children afflicted with HIV/AIDS.

== Education ==
He obtained his master's degree in pharmacy from the University of Durban-Westville (South Africa) in 1996 and bagged his PhD at Temple University in 2000 as a Fulbright Scholar.

== Scientific contributions ==
He developed RapiDiss Wafer Technology as an innovative way to provide effective anti-retroviral (ARV) drug therapy to children afflicted with HIV/AIDS. He developed the world's fastest dissolving matrix for the onset of rapid drug action in the human body, a neural device for therapeutic intervention in spinal cord injury and novel wound healing technologies. He also came up with his own molecular modelling paradigms called PEiGOR Theory - Pillay's Electro-influenced Geometrical Organization-Reorganization. This theory was published in the International Journal of Pharmaceutics.

== Fellowship and membership ==
He was elected a Fellow of the Academy of Science of South Africa in 2012. He was also a member of the American Chemical Society, the American Association of Pharmaceutical Scientists, the New York Academy of Sciences, the Academy of Pharmaceutical Sciences of South Africa, and The Biomaterials Network.

== Awards and honours ==
He was a beneficiary of National Research Foundation (NRF) Awards.

== Death ==
Pillay died on 24 July 2020 after a lengthy illness. He left behind a wife and a daughter.
