= Hulamin =

- Type: Public company
- Traded as: JSE: HLM
- Industry: Worked aluminium
- Founded: 1935
- Headquarters: Pietermaritzburg, KwaZulu-Natal, South Africa
- Area served: Global
- Key people: Richard Jacob (CEO) Noel Doyle(CFO) Khotso Mokhele (Chairman)
- Products: rolled aluminium, aluminium alloys, recycled aluminium
- Revenue: R10.2 billion (US$714 million)
- Number of employees: 1,934 (FY 2016)
- Website: www.hulamin.com

Hulamin is a South African company based in Pietermaritzburg that specialises in rolled aluminium products for precision and high technology applications. The company supplies a significant proportion of the world's ultra high-end aluminium products. It is known for being a key supplier of worked aluminium components for Tesla electric vehicles and aeronautical Wi-Fi components.

In 2018/19 the company was negatively affected by cheaper Chinese imports into its South African market, higher tariffs on its exports to the United States, reduced demand from the automotive industry, and has faced criticism for high executive overheads.
