= Henry Fadamiro =

Nigerian-born American entomologist

Henry Y. Fadamiro
- Born: Nigeria
- Citizenship: US
- Education: Federal University of Technology Akure; University of Oxford
- Scientific career
- Institutions: Iowa State University; University of Minnesota; Auburn University; Texas A & M University

Henry Yemisi Fadamiro is a Nigerian-American entomologist and academic administrator with research into chemical and physiological mechanisms of plant-insect and tritrophic interactions. He is the co-founder of the International Association of Black Entomologists, IABE (formerly Black Entomologists). He is a fellow of the Royal Entomological Society, the African Academy of Sciences, the Nigerian Academy of Science, and a member of the National Academy of Inventors.

== Early life and education ==
Fadamiro was born in Ondo, Ondo State, Nigeria. He completed his secondary school education at St. Joseph's College, Ondo, Nigeria. He received a bachelor's degree in Biology in 1989 at the Federal University of Technology, Akure, Nigeria. He completed a Master of Science degree in the same department and later earned a Ph.D. in Entomology and Pest Management from the University of Oxford in England in 1995, where he was a Rhodes Scholar

== Academic career ==
Fadamiro currently serves as Associate Vice President for Research for Texas A&M University, College Station. Previously, he served as a researcher at the International Institute of Tropical Agriculture, Ibadan, Nigeria, Iowa State University, University of Minnesota, and Minnesota Department of Agriculture. In 2003, he started as an assistant professor at Auburn University and became a professor in 2012. At Auburn, he was Assistant Dean Director of Global Programs for Agriculture and later an Associate Dean for Research for the College of Agriculture/Associate Director of Alabama Agricultural Experiment Stations. In 2021, he was appointed Chief Scientific Officer & Associate Director of the Texas A&M AgriLife Research and as Associate Dean for the College of Agriculture and Life Sciences at Texas A&M University. Fadamiro co-founded and served as pioneer president of the International Association of Black Entomologists.

His most cited papers are:

- Olson, D. A. W. N. M., Fadamiro, H., Lundgren, J. N. G., & Heimpel, G. E. (2000). Effects of sugar feeding on carbohydrate and lipid metabolism in a parasitoid wasp. Physiological Entomology, 25(1), 17-26. (Cited 270 times, according to Google Scholar
- Onagbola EO, Fadamiro HY. Scanning electron microscopy studies of antennal sensilla of Pteromalus cerealellae (Hymenoptera: Pteromalidae). Micron. 2008 Jul 1;39(5):526-35 (Cited 164 times, according to Google Scholar
- Baker, T. C., Fadamiro, H. Y., & Cosse, A. A. (1998). Moth uses fine tuning for odour resolution. Nature, 393(6685), 530-53 (Cited 140 times, according to Google Scholar
- Xiao Y, Fadamiro HY. Functional responses and prey-stage preferences of three species of predacious mites (Acari: Phytoseiidae) on citrus red mite, Panonychus citri (Acari: Tetranychidae). Biological Control. 2010 Jun 1;53(3):345-52. Cited 123 times according to Google Scholar
- Fadamiro HY, Baker TC. Reproductive performance and longevity of female European corn borer, Ostrinia nubilalis: effects of multiple mating, delay in mating, and adult feeding. Journal of Insect Physiology. 1999 Apr 1;45(4):385-92.(Cited 120 times, according to Google Scholar
- Fadamiro HY, Heimpel GE. Effects of partial sugar deprivation on lifespan and carbohydrate mobilization in the parasitoid Macrocentrus grandii (Hymenoptera: Braconidae). Annals of the Entomological Society of America. 2001 Nov 1;94(6):909-16 (Cited 118 times, according to Google Scholar

== Personal life ==
He is married to Helen Fadamiro, with three children.

== Recognition and awards ==
He was named a fellow of the Royal Entomological Society in 2010, and fellow of the African Academy of Sciences in 2020 and a fellow of the Nigerian Academy of Science in 2023. In 2011, he received the Award for Excellence in IPM from the Entomological Society of America– Southeastern Branch and was named Alumni Professor at Auburn University. He served as Editor for Physiological Entomology from 2010 to 2019.
