= Joseph Dweba =

South Africa international rugby union player

Joseph Pieter Dweba
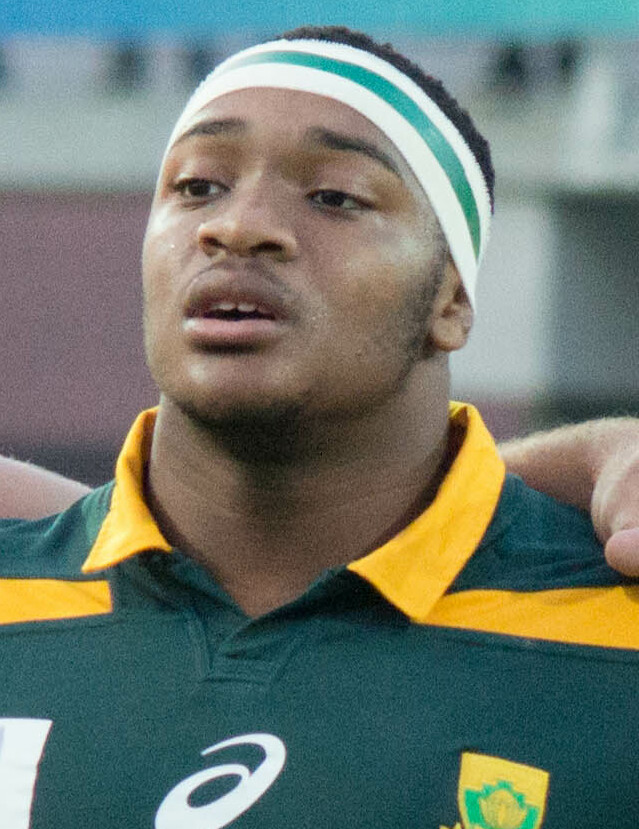
- Dweba in 2015
- Born: 25 October 1995 (age 31) Carletonville, South Africa
- Height: 1.75 m (5 ft 9 in)
- Weight: 112 kg (17 st 9 lb; 247 lb)
- School: HTS Louis Botha THS, Bloemfontein; Hoërskool Florida, Roodepoort; Hoërskool Jan Viljoen, Randfontein

Rugby union career
- Position: Hooker
- Current team: Stormers / Western Province
Youth career
- 2011–2013: Golden Lions
- 2014–2016: Free State Cheetahs
Senior career
Years	Team	Apps	(Points)
2015–2018	Free State XV	26	(50)
2016–2020	Cheetahs	28	(55)
2016–2020	Free State Cheetahs	20	(45)
2020–2022	Bordeaux	30	(25)
2022–2025	Stormers	60	(50)
2025–	Exeter Chiefs	26	(25)
- Correct as of 20 June 2026
International career
Years	Team	Apps	(Points)
2013	South Africa Schools	3	(0)
2014–2015	South Africa Under-20	6	(0)
2021–	South Africa	6	(0)
- Correct as of 5 August 2023

Joseph Dweba (born 25 October 1995) is a South African professional rugby union player for Exeter Chiefs in the Premiership Rugby competition. He previously played for Cheetahs in the Pro14 and the Free State Cheetahs in the Currie Cup. His regular position is hooker.

== Club career ==
=== Golden Lions / South African Schools ===
His first provincial representation came in 2011, when he was selected for the Golden Lions Under-16 side that played at the Grant Khomo Week competition.

He also represented the Golden Lions two years later, this time in the premier South African high school rugby union competition, the Under-18 Craven Week, held in Polokwane. He appeared in all three of their matches, including the 29–45 defeat in the unofficial final against Western Province. His performance led to his inclusion in the South African Schools side and he made appearances for them in wins against England, France and Wales in August 2013.

=== Free State Cheetahs / South Africa Under-20 ===
For the 2014 season, Dweba made the move to Bloemfontein to join the Free State Cheetahs. He remained in the thoughts of the national selectors and was called up into the South Africa Under-20 squad for the 2014 IRB Junior World Championship held in New Zealand in June 2014. He came on as a replacement in their second Pool C match against hosts New Zealand, helping them to a 33–24 victory. He was an unused replacement for final pool match against Samoa and in their 32–25 semi-final win against New Zealand. He played off the bench in the final against England, coming on just after half time, but could not prevent South Africa losing the match 20–21 to finish as runners-up in the competition. He returned to domestic action in the latter half of 2014, making two appearances for the Free State U19 side in the 2014 Under-19 Provincial Championship.

After playing a single match for club side Bloemfontein Crusaders in the 2015 SARU Community Cup, Dweba was included in the Free State XV that competed in the 2015 Vodacom Cup. He made his provincial first class debut by starting their opening match of the season against SWD Eagles, but ended on the losing side as SWD ran out 17–33 winners. He made a further three appearances off the bench as the Free State XV finished the group stage in third place in the Southern Section before losing 21–44 to the Blue Bulls in the quarter finals.

He was included in a 37-man training squad for the South African Under-20 team and started a friendly match against a Varsity Cup Dream Team in April 2015. He was included in the squad that toured Argentina in May 2015; he started their first match, a 25–22 win for South Africa, and came on as a replacement in their second match, scoring a try five minutes from time in a 39–28 victory.

Upon the team's return, he was named in the final squad for the 2015 World Rugby Under 20 Championship. He was an unused replacement in their first match of the competition, a 33–5 win against hosts Italy, but started their remaining two matches in Pool B; a 40–8 win against Samoa and a 46–13 win over Australia to help South Africa finish top of Pool B to qualify for the semi-finals with the best record pool stage of all the teams in the competition. Dweba started their semi-final match against England, but could not prevent them losing 20–28 to be eliminated from the competition by England for the second year in succession and played off the bench in their third-place play-off match against France, helping South Africa to a 31–18 win to secure third place in the competition.

=== Bordeaux ===
In 2020 he joined Bordeaux, in the Top 14 competition from the 2020-21 season.

=== Stormers ===
In 2022, Dweba returns to his home nation in South Africa to sign for Stormers in the United Rugby Championship from the 2022-23 season.

=== Exeter Chiefs ===
On 19 March 2025, Dweba makes his to move to England to join Exeter Chiefs in the Premiership Rugby competition ahead of the 2025-26 season.

== International career ==
In June 2021, Dweba was called up by the national team for the first time being included in a 46-man Springbok Squad to do duty against the British and Irish Lions. He made his test debut for Springboks against Argentina on 14 August 2021 at the Nelson Mandela Bay Stadium.
