= Moctar Touré =

Senegalese professor (born 1944)

- Born: May 14, 1944 (age 82)
- Citizenship: Senegal
- Education: University of Orleans; University of Rennes
- Scientific career
- Fields: Natural sciences, agronomy, soil chemistry, environment, desertification and land management, science policy and management.
- Workplaces: The Global Environment Facility (GEF); United Nations Development Programme (UNDP); United Nations Convention to Combat Desertification; African Development Bank Islamic Development Bank
- Thesis: Chemical evolution of indigenous rock phosphates (Taiba, Thies and Tilemsi) in tropical soils under various water regimes. (1973)

Moctar Touré is a Senegalese professor of Agricultural & Nutritional Sciences. He is a Founding member of the African Academy of Sciences, Senegalese National Academy of Science and the Vice President of The World Academy of Sciences representing African region. He was a former director of the National Rice Research Centre of the Senegalese Institute for Agricultural Research (ISRA) and he was also a director of the Department of Agricultural and agro-industrial research at the Ministry of Sciences and Technology.

== Early life education ==
Touré was born on May 14, 1944. He obtained his first degree in 1967 from University of Orleans where he studied Biology and Natural Sciences. In 1970, he obtained his master's degree from University of Rennes where he studied agronomy and soil science. In 1973, he obtained his PhD from the same university where he studied Soil Science

== Research areas ==
Touré focused on the fields of agronomy, soil chemistry, desertification and sustainable land management.

== Career ==
From 1974-1988, Touré was a scientist and science manager in the Senegalese agricultural research system. He proceeded to work with World Bank at the Global Environment Facility headquarters in Washington, D.C. where he retired in 2006 as the Team Leader of the Land and Water Resources unit of the Global Environmental Facility (GEF).
