= Kimani Toussaint =

American professor and academic

- Born: Kimani Christopher Toussaint; Philadelphia
- Education: Boston University; University of Pennsylvania
- Awards: National Science Foundation CAREER Award (2010)
- Scientific career
- Workplaces: University of Chicago; University of Illinois at Urbana-Champaign; Massachusetts Institute of Technology; Brown University
- Thesis: Quantum ellipsometry (2004)
- Website: sites.brown.edu/probelab

Kimani Christopher Toussaint, Jr. is an American engineer who is a professor and senior associate dean in the School of Engineering at Brown University. His research considers the development of quantitative nonlinear optical imaging methods and advanced optical techniques for nanotechnology, and the characterization of plasmonic nanostructure. He is a Fellow of Optica.

== Early life and education ==
Toussaint is from Philadelphia. He became interested in physics as a child. Toussaint studied physics and African American Studies at the University of Pennsylvania, where he met Anthony Garito, a professor who introduced him to optics and engineering. In his physics classes, he was one of the only African American students. He moved to Boston University for his graduate research, where he specialized in electrical engineering. His doctoral research explored quantum ellipsometry of semiconductors. At Boston, he was awarded a Gates Millennium Fellowship, which supported his graduate program.

== Research and career ==
After his PhD, Toussaint was a postdoctoral fellow at the University of Chicago, where he worked on superresolution optical microscopy, optical tweezing of nanoparticles, and polarization control.

Toussaint was appointed to the faculty at the University of Illinois at Urbana-Champaign in 2007. His research exploits various properties of light, including angular momentum, linear momentum and other polarization degrees of freedom. He is interested in the realization of bioimaging techniques to better understand biological tissue and disease. To this end, he developed an imaging platform that combines second-harmonic generation imaging with confocal microscopy and Mueller matrix polarimetry. Alongside bioimaging, Toussaint has developed nano antennas to exploit near-field optics.

In 2014, Toussaint worked as a Martin Luther King Jr. Visiting associate professor at Massachusetts Institute of Technology and worked with Peter So. In Fall 2019, Toussaint joined the faculty at Brown University, and by 2020 he was made a Senior Associate Dean of the School of Engineering. He leads the Photonics Research of Bio/Nano Environments (PROBE) laboratory and is Senior Associate Dean in the School of Engineering. He is part of the National Science Foundation Engineering Research Center in Cellular Metamaterials.

During the COVID-19 pandemic, it emerged that pulse oximeters were less effective on Black patients. This is because melanin absorbs light, making pulse oximeters overestimate the level of oxygen in a patient's blood. In response, Toussaint started to develop a new, more equitable device. In an interview with Optica, Toussaint said that the pandemic changed his perspective of where his research could have the largest societal impact.

=== Awards and honors ===
Toussaint is a Fellow of SPIE and Optica. Other awards and honors include:

- 2010 National Science Foundation CAREER Award
- 2014 Dr. Martin Luther King, Jr. Visiting Associate Professor
- 2015 Illinois Dean's Award for Excellence in Research
- 2017 Illinois Everitt Award for Teaching Excellence
- 2019 Distinguished Promotion Award
- 2020 Elected Fellow of the African Academy of Sciences
- 2021 Elected Fellow of the American Institute for Medical and Biological Engineering

=== Selected publications ===
His publications include

- Application of plasmonic bowtie nanoantenna arrays for optical trapping, stacking, and sorting
- The effect of keratoconus on the structural, mechanical, and optical properties of the corne
- Nonlinear optical response from arrays of Au bowtie nanoantennas
