= Ashraf Mansour =

Egyptian Scientist and professor of polymer physics

Professor Ashraf Mansour FAAS
- أشرف منصور
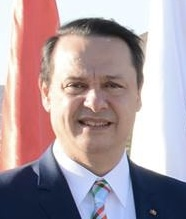
- Known for: Founder and Chairman of the Board of Trustees of the German University in Cairo (GUC)
- Awards: Federal Cross of Merit (2008); Honorary Fellow of the African Academy of Sciences (2018); Honorary Senator of the University of Ulm

Academic background
- Education: University of Ulm (PhD 1992, Habilitation)

Academic work
- Discipline: Physics, polymer physics

Ashraf Mansour FAAS (Arabic: أشرف منصور) is an Egyptian scientist and professor of polymer physics. He is the Founder & Chairman of Board of Trustees of German University in Cairo (GUC).

== Education and career ==
Mansour obtained his doctorate and habilitation in polymer physics from the University of Ulm in 1992.

In 1994, Mansour started the process of creating a German University in Egypt. The German University in Cairo (GUC) is the first German university to be established outside Germany and outside European borders. It was established on the basis of a presidential decree in 2002 issued by former President Hosni Mubarak, German Chancellor Gerhard Schroeder, and a number of prominent figures in both Egyptian and German academia and industry.

In 2003, the GUC was inaugurated outside Cairo's city limits. Mansour secured the building of a whole new technical university in New Cairo City, funded almost 15 million euros from Egyptian donors, and engaged the help of the faculties of Stuttgart and Ulm universities in order to make his concept a reality. They assisted in building and setting up the labs technically and brought their German curriculum with them. The initiative received funding from the DAAD in the amount of about 600,000 euros as a part of its Export of German Degree Courses programme. Students, scholars, and researchers from the GUC are additionally supported by the DAAD and the Alexander von Humboldt Foundation during various study and research stays. He is the chairman of the Board of Trustees of the university.

After the Egyptian Revolution of 2011, Ashraf was tipped by the Supreme Council of the Armed Forces (SCAF) to head the Ministry of Higher Education in 2014 but the Egyptian Supreme Council of Universities protested his appointment. Hossam Eisa remained in the position and was replaced by Ashraf El-Shihy in September 2015.

== Awards and recognitions ==
In 2008, Mansour received the Federal Cross of Merit, and he is an honorary senator of the University of Ulm. Mansour was elected an Honorary Fellow of the African Academy of Sciences in 2018.
