= Thomas R. Odhiambo =

Kenyan entomologist (1931–2003)

- Born: February 4, 1931; Mombasa, Kenya
- Died: May 26, 2003 (aged 72); Nairobi, Kenya
- Education: Makerere University; Queens' College, Cambridge
- Scientific career
- Fields: Entomology

Professor Thomas Risley Odhiambo (February 4, 1931 – May 26, 2003) was a Kenyan entomologist and environmental activist who directed research and scientific development in Africa.

== Life and education ==
Odhiambo was educated at Maseno School in Kenya, Makerere University in Uganda and Queens' College, Cambridge in United Kingdom.

He founded the International Centre of Insect Physiology and Ecology (icipe) and helped to establish three institutions of learning: the Third World Academy of Sciences, the Kenyan National Academy of Sciences and the African Academy of Sciences.

He inspired different Kenyan scholars and leaders, notably, academician Odhiambo Siangla and politician Kalonzo Musyoka.

He encouraged the younger generation of thinkers to venture into the fine arts, investigate its relation to history of life sciences and to go out and create global academies and research institutions using technology. His inspiring effect led to the re–emergence of accumulated indigenous knowledge and technology systems in the modern African world. He led visions on agricultural development in Africa by initiating effective scientific projects leading to advancement in growing indigenous crops and disseminating methods of insect control. Educated in Cambridge University, UK, Prof. Odhiambo completed a PhD in 1965 under the supervision of the guru of insect physiology, Vincent Wigglesworth, producing a 'phenomenally productive' thesis on the reproductive physiology of the desert locust, producing a series of 14 papers on the topic. He marked his arrival into the world of insect science through a sole-authored short communication in Nature journal titled, Metabolic effects of corpus allatum hormone, in the desert locust, Schistocerca gregaria.

== Founder of icipe (International Centre for Insect Physiology and Ecology) ==
Upon his return to Kenya, Prof. Odhiambo, took up a position as a lecturer in the Department of Zoology at the University of Nairobi. In 1967, he was approached by the Science journal to write a review on the status of science in Africa. In the article, Prof. Odhiambo observed that scientific research was urgently required in the then postcolonial Africa, to develop environmentally safe strategies to increase agricultural production, and to address prevalent tropical and vector borne diseases. He stressed that the science conducted in Africa should have at its heart the elevation of the livelihoods of smallholder farmers.

At the same time, Prof. Odhiambo noted, the indigenous scientific community in Africa was 'woefully small', and the continent was hardly equipped, from a financial and infrastructural point of view, to effectively tackle the challenges at hand. He, therefore, proposed that Africa's best long term solution towards conducting effective research was to concentrate efforts in a few centres of excellence.

Giving the example that eventually led to the establishment of icipe, Prof. Odhiambo recommended that Africa's insect research could be located in one centre that would have the best equipment, which would be put to the best advantage. Such a centre would have a permanent staff; it would also train young researchers from Africa and offer opportunities to other scientists from across the globe looking for 'periodical renovation'. In Prof Odhiambo's words, the insect science centre of excellence would become 'a powerhouse for the initiated and those wishing to be initiated into research'.

Prof. Odhiambo's ideas got support from, among others, Carl Djerassi, a world-renowned American scientist. Together, Odhiambo and Djerassi set the wheels in motion for the launching of icipe. Eventually, they gained the support of 21 national academies of science across the globe, who became sponsors of icipe, providing the needed external research directors.

Prof. Odhiambo later remarked: "The idea was actually very simple, get the very best people and then if you have more money, put buildings and equipment around them."

In the beginning money was in short supply at icipe, and the Centre's headquarters consisted of a number of rented wood-frame barracks perched on the hillside of Chiromo Campus at the University of Nairobi. The first postdoctoral researcher arrived to work in a garage that flooded when it rained and the budget was improvised from week to week.

Today, icipe stands as a centre of scientific excellence and training in Africa. And as Prof. Odhiambo had hoped, it is indeed staffed mainly by indigenous African scientists. icipe currently has a staff of more than 400, and the Centre collaborates with over 200 national systems, research institutes and universities around the world.

Prof. Odhiambo's vision of holistic science is today embodied in the Centre's 4Hs paradigm, denoting human, animal, plant and environmental health. Its major research areas include disease vectors, such as mosquitoes and tsetse, as well as pests of cereals and horticultural crops. icipe scientists are also conducting research into beneficial insects such as bees and silkworm moths.

== Honors and awards ==
- 1987 Africa Prize for Leadership jointly with President Abdou Diouf of Senegal.
- Albert Einstein Medal
- Gold Mercury International Award
- Gold Medal March International Congress of Plant Protection
- Honorary Doctorate of Science from the University of Oslo
- 1992 Elected to the American Philosophical Society
- 1985 elected as an founding fellow of the African Academy of Sciences.

== Books and publications ==
- Land-Use Literacy for Sustainable Food Production in Africa, 1994
- Science for Development in Africa : Proceedings of the Consultation on the Management of Science for Development in Africa, Duduville, Kasarani, Nairobi, Kenya, November 21–24, by Turner Timinipre Isoun, 1988
- Hope Born Out of Despair : Managing the African Crisis, by United Nations University,

== See also ==
- Luo people of Kenya and Tanzania
