= Samson Gombe =

Kenyan professor of biological sciences

Professor Samson Gombe FAAS FTWAS
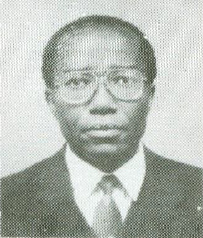
- Born: 5 November 1938; Seme, Kisumu, Kenya
- Died: 4 February 1989 (aged 50)
- Education: Makerere University (BSc); University of London (MSc); Cornell University (PhD)
- Scientific career
- Fields: Malnutrition; Mineral deficiencies Phylogenesis; Reproductive physiology Endocrinology
- Institutions: University of Nairobi, Kenya

Samson Gombe FAAS FTWAS (5 November 1938 – 4 February 1989) was a Kenyan professor of Biological Systems and Organisms. He was a Fellow of Third World Academy of Sciences and a Founding Fellow and Secretary of African Academy of Sciences.

== Early life and education ==
Gombe was born on 5 November 1938 in Seme, Kisumu, Kenya. He attended Maseno School, Makerere College between 1958 and 1960. Then educated at the University of London (1961-9167) and Cornell University (1969-1972).

== Career and research ==
Gombe was a lecturer at the Department of Animal Physiology, University of Nairobi from 1968 until his death on 4 February 1989, aged 50, after a short illness. Gombe was one of the founders of the African Academy of Sciences in 1985, and later became the Secretary/Scientific General (1987–1989) and Treasurer (1987–1989). He was an Honorary Assistant Treasurer of Kenya National Academy of Science.

Gombe focused more on reproductive physiology, endocrinology, malnutrition, mineral deficiencies, adverse environmental and parasitic infections that may lead to infertility.

== Awards and recognitions ==
Gombe was a Foundry Fellow of the African Academy of Sciences as of its inception in 1985 a Fellow of The World Academy of Sciences since 1985, and a Fellow of the Kenya National Academy of Sciences in 1986.

== Selected publications ==
- Gombe, Samson; Oduor-Okelo, Dominic (1991-06). Development of the foetal membranes in the cane rat (Thryonomys swinderianus): a re‐interpretation, African Journal of Ecology, Volume 29, Issue 2, pages 157–167
- Samson Gombe, William Hansel (1973-09-01). Plasma Luteinizing Hormone (LH) and Progesterone Levels in Heifers on Restricted Energy Intakes Get access Arrow. Journal of Animal Science, Volume 37, Issue 3, September 1973, Pages 728–733.
- Norman, Charles; Gombe, Samson (1975-09-01). Stimulatory effect of the lysosomal stabilizer, chloroquine, on the respiration and motility of fresh and aged bovine spermatozoa. Reproduction. 44 (3): 481–486. doi:10.1530/jrf.0.0440481. ISSN 0022-4251.
- Alila, Hector W.; Rogo, Khama O.; Gombe, Samson (1987-06-01). Effects of prolactin on steroidogenesis by human luteal cells in culture. Fertility and Sterility. 47 (6): 947–955. doi:10.1016/S0015-0282(16)59228-0. ISSN 0015-0282. (Note: Supported by reentry grant for HWA from World Health Organization Special Programme of Research, Development and Research Training in Human Reproduction)
