= Raoelina Andriambololona =

Madagascar professor of physics

- Born: 16 May 1936 (age 90); Tamatave
- Occupations: Academician; Scientist
- Awards: 2020 TWAS-C.N.R. Rao Award

Academic background
- Education: University of Madagascar; University of Aix Marseilles

Academic work
- Discipline: Physicist
- Sub-discipline: Particle Physics, Nuclear Physics, Quantum Physics
- Institutions: University of Antananarivo

Raoelina Andriambololona is a Malagasy professor of physics. He was a founding Vice President of African Academy of Sciences, a member of The World Academy of Sciences and he was the founding Director General of National Institute for Nuclear Sciences and Technologies (INSTN - Madagascar).

== Early life and education ==
Andriambololona was born on May 16, 1936, in Tamatave, Madagascar. He obtained his first degree from University of Madagascar in 1956 and he obtained his doctorate degree from University of Aix Marseilles, Saint-Charles Faculty of Science in 1967.

== Research areas ==
Andriambololona focuses on Elementary particles physics, Quantum Field Theory, Relativity, Quantum Mechanics, Nuclear Physics, X-Ray Fluorescence Analysis, Spectroscopy Analysis of Radioactive and non-radioactive Malagasy ores; Radiation Protection and Environment

== Career ==
Andriambololona became a professor in 1977. He was a director of department of Physics in University of Antananarivo. He was also a Dean of the Malagasy Academy, Former International Atomic Energy Agency National Liaison Officer, founding member and scientific consultant of African regional Agreement (AFRA) in Nuclear Energy since 1989 and he also served as scientific adviser to the President, Madagascar Republic.

== Fellowship and membership ==
He is an active member of the Third World Academy of Science (TWAS), he was elected in 1985. A member of African Academy of Sciences where he was a Former founding vice-president of the association. He was also elected in the same year. A Member of the New York Academy of Science, U.S.A., American Physical Society, Member of Society of African Physicists and Mathematicians (Accra, Ghana) and the European Physical Society
