= Jinde Cao =

Chinese mathematician

Jinde Cao (born 8 November 1963) is a Chinese mathematician specializing in dynamical systems, neural networks, complex networks, control theory, and applied mathematics. He is an Endowed Chair Professor at Southeast University, where he serves as Dean of the Science Department and Director of the National Center for Applied Mathematics (SEU–Jiangsu). His research has focused on the mathematical theory and applications of neural networks, complex dynamical systems, multi-agent systems, and networked intelligence.

== Early life and education ==
Cao received a Bachelor of Science in mathematics from Anhui Normal University in 1986. He earned a Master of Science in applied mathematics from Yunnan University in 1989 and a Ph.D. in applied mathematics from Sichuan University in 1998. From 2001 to 2002, he was a postdoctoral research fellow at the Chinese University of Hong Kong.

== Academic career ==
After completing his master's degree at Yunnan University, Cao joined the university's Department of Mathematics, where he began his academic career as a lecturer.

His early research focused on differential equations, nonlinear systems, and neural network theory, areas that would become the foundation of his later work in systems science and network dynamics. He was promoted to associate professor and subsequently became one of the youngest full professors in applied mathematics in China.

In 2000, Cao joined Southeast University in Nanjing as a professor of mathematics. Over the following two decades he played a central role in expanding the university's research capacity in applied mathematics, systems engineering, and computational intelligence. He successively served as Dean of the School of Mathematics and later Dean of the School of Science, overseeing interdisciplinary teaching and research programs that integrated mathematics with computer science, engineering, artificial intelligence, and information technology.

A major milestone in Cao's academic career came with the establishment of the Research Center for Complex Systems and Network Sciences at Southeast University, where he became founding director. The center was created to promote interdisciplinary research on complex dynamical systems, network science, intelligent control, optimization, and data-driven engineering. Under Cao's leadership, the center developed collaborations with universities and research institutes across Europe, North America, Asia, and Australia, becoming one of China's leading centers for research on complex systems.

Cao has also directed several national and provincial research platforms. He serves as Director of the Jiangsu National Center for Applied Mathematics (Southeast University), established as part of China's national strategy to strengthen collaboration between mathematical sciences and industry. The center promotes the application of mathematical modeling, optimization, artificial intelligence, and computational science to engineering, manufacturing, transportation, and public infrastructure.

He also directs the Jiangsu Provincial Key Laboratory of Networked Collective Intelligence, where research addresses distributed intelligence, swarm systems, autonomous decision-making, cyber-physical systems, and intelligent manufacturing. Additional leadership positions include Director of the Jiangsu Provincial Information Mathematics Application Center and Deputy Director of the Jiangsu Provincial Steering Committee for Postgraduate Education in Science.

Beyond university administration, Cao has served on national advisory committees for mathematics education and scientific research. He is a member of the Teaching Steering Committee for Mathematics Majors under China's Ministry of Education and has participated in the development of national strategies for graduate education, applied mathematics, and scientific innovation. He has also held appointments promoting science education in Jiangsu Province, including serving as Science Vice Principal for schools in Nanjing.

Throughout his career, Cao has been principal investigator or chief scientist for numerous national research programs, including National Key Research and Development Program projects and National Natural Science Foundation of China Key Projects. His research funding has supported interdisciplinary collaborations involving mathematics, artificial intelligence, transportation engineering, robotics, network science, cybersecurity, and intelligent manufacturing.

== Research ==
Jinde Cao's research spans applied mathematics, systems science, control engineering, artificial intelligence, and computational intelligence. His work has contributed to the mathematical foundations of complex networks, nonlinear dynamical systems, neural networks, multi-agent systems, optimization, stochastic systems, and networked collective intelligence. Through more than three decades of research, he has helped establish modern theoretical frameworks for understanding how large-scale interconnected systems behave, synchronize, adapt, and remain stable under uncertainty.

=== Complex systems and network science ===
One of Cao's principal research areas concerns the mathematical theory of complex networks. His work investigates how large interconnected systems evolve over time and how synchronization, stability, and consensus emerge despite nonlinear interactions, communication delays, switching topologies, and stochastic disturbances.

His theoretical contributions have provided rigorous stability criteria for delayed dynamical networks, impulsive systems, adaptive synchronization, pinning control, and event-triggered coordination. These mathematical methods have found applications in electrical power grids, transportation systems, wireless communication networks, biological systems, financial networks, and social networks.

Cao has also developed methods for analyzing multilayer and multiplex networks, in which different types of interactions occur simultaneously. His work has improved understanding of network resilience, cascading failures, robustness, and collective dynamics in increasingly complex engineering systems.

=== Neural networks and artificial intelligence ===
Another major component of Cao's research concerns the mathematical theory of artificial neural networks. Beginning with recurrent neural networks and delayed neural systems, his work has expanded to include memristive neural networks, fuzzy neural networks, stochastic neural networks, cellular neural networks, and deep learning architectures.

His research investigates the stability, convergence, synchronization, and optimization of neural systems under uncertain environments. Rather than focusing primarily on algorithm development, Cao emphasizes rigorous mathematical analysis that guarantees reliable operation of intelligent systems.

His work has also addressed finite-time convergence, adaptive learning, distributed intelligence, event-triggered computation, and robust optimization. These theoretical developments have provided mathematical foundations for applications in intelligent control, pattern recognition, autonomous systems, image processing, and machine learning.

=== Multi-agent systems and distributed optimization ===
Cao has made significant contributions to distributed cooperative control and optimization of multi-agent systems. His research examines how autonomous agents—including robots, sensors, vehicles, and intelligent devices—can cooperate using only local information while achieving global objectives.

His work has introduced new consensus algorithms capable of operating under communication delays, packet losses, switching network topologies, cyberattacks, and uncertain environments. He has also investigated privacy-preserving distributed optimization, resilient consensus, adaptive event-triggered control, and distributed estimation.

=== Cyber-physical systems and intelligent engineering ===
In recent years, Cao's research has increasingly focused on cyber-physical systems, integrating mathematical modeling with artificial intelligence and engineering applications. His teams have developed theoretical and computational methods for intelligent transportation, industrial internet systems, digital twins, smart manufacturing, network security, and intelligent infrastructure.

=== Networked collective intelligence ===
As Director of the Jiangsu Provincial Key Laboratory of Networked Collective Intelligence, Cao has pioneered research on networked collective intelligence, an interdisciplinary field combining network science, artificial intelligence, optimization, control theory, and data science.

=== Scientific impact ===
Cao has authored more than 2,000 scientific publications, including research articles, books, and conference papers, making him one of the world's most prolific researchers in applied mathematics and systems engineering. His publications have accumulated over 90,000 citations in Web of Science and more than 110,000 citations in Google Scholar, with an H-index exceeding 140.

He has been recognized repeatedly as a Clarivate Highly Cited Researcher in engineering, computer science, and mathematics and has consistently appeared in Stanford University's Top 2% of Scientists rankings. His work has influenced subsequent research in nonlinear systems, intelligent control, optimization, machine learning, complex networks, and computational mathematics, and has been widely applied in engineering, communications, transportation, and artificial intelligence research worldwide.

=== Editorial activities ===
Cao has served on the editorial boards of numerous international journals in mathematics, control engineering, artificial intelligence, and computational intelligence. He has been Associate Editor, Senior Editor, or Editor-in-Chief of journals including IEEE Transactions on Neural Networks, IEEE Transactions on Cybernetics, IEEE Transactions on Cognitive and Developmental Systems, Neural Networks, Neurocomputing, Journal of the Franklin Institute, Mathematics and Computers in Simulation, Cognitive Neurodynamics, and several journals devoted to intelligent control and artificial intelligence.

== Awards and honors ==
- 2026 – Elected Foreign Member, Polish Academy of Sciences (Polska Akademia Nauk).
- 2024 – Appointed Honorary Professor, Institute of Mathematics and Mathematical Modeling, Kazakhstan.
- 2024 – Awarded the Jiangsu Provincial May Day Labor Medal.
- 2022 – Elected Foreign Member, Russian Academy of Sciences.
- 2021 – Selected for the Zijinshan Elite Talents Peak Program.
- 2020 – Elected Foreign Member, Lithuanian Academy of Sciences.
- 2019 – Elected Fellow, African Academy of Sciences.
- 2019 – Elected Fellow, International Academy of Systems and Control.
- 2019 – Recipient of the International Obada Award.
- 2018 – Elected Member, European Academy of Sciences and Arts.
- 2017 – Recipient of the National Innovation and Advancement Award of China.
- 2016 – Elected Member, European Academy of Sciences.
- 2016 – Elected Foreign Fellow, Pakistan Academy of Sciences.
- 2016 – Awarded the State Council Special Government Allowance.
- 2015 – Elevated to Fellow, Institute of Electrical and Electronics Engineers (IEEE).
- 2014 – Named one of the inaugural Thomson Reuters China Citation Laureates.
- 2010 – Awarded First Prize, Jiangsu Provincial Science and Technology Award (ranked first).
- 2008 – Recipient of the Thomson Reuters Research Excellence Award (Independent).
- 2007 – Awarded Second Prize, Ministry of Education Natural Science Award (ranked first).

== Selected publications ==
=== Selected books ===
- Cao, J., Li, X., & Song, S. (2025). Finite-time stability and control of impulsive systems. Science Press. (In Chinese).
- Kacprzyk, J., Novikov, D. A., Shi, P., Cao, J., Polycarpou, M., & Pedrycz, W. (Series Eds.). (2023–present). Studies in Systems, Decision and Control. Springer.
- Xu, W., Ho, D. W. C., & Cao, J. (2023). Event-triggered cooperative control: Analysis and synthesis. Springer.
- Lu, J., Li, L., Ho, D. W. C., & Cao, J. (2021). Collective behavior in complex networked systems under imperfect communication. Springer Nature Singapore & Science Press.
- Yu, W., Wen, G., Chen, G., & Cao, J. (2016). Distributed cooperative control of multi-agent systems. Wiley & Higher Education Press.

=== Selected articles ===
- Lu, J., Ho, D. W. C., & Cao, J. (2010). A unified synchronization criterion for impulsive dynamical networks. Automatica, 46(7), 1215–1221.
- Song, Q., Cao, J., & Yu, W. (2010). Second-order leader-following consensus of nonlinear multi-agent systems via pinning control. Systems & Control Letters, 59(9), 553–562.
- Cao, J., & Wang, J. (2003). Global asymptotic stability of a general class of recurrent neural networks with time-varying delays. IEEE Transactions on Circuits and Systems I: Fundamental Theory and Applications, 50(1), 34–44.
- Yu, W., Zheng, W. X., Chen, G., Ren, W., & Cao, J. (2011). Second-order consensus in multi-agent dynamical systems with sampled position data. Automatica, 47(7), 1496–1503.
- Cao, J., & Wang, J. (2005). Global asymptotic and robust stability of recurrent neural networks with time delays. IEEE Transactions on Circuits and Systems I: Regular Papers, 52(2), 417–426.
- Cao, J., & Wang, L. (2002). Exponential stability and periodic oscillatory solution in BAM networks with delays. IEEE Transactions on Neural Networks, 13(2), 457–463.
- Song, Q., & Cao, J. (2009). On pinning synchronization of directed and undirected complex dynamical networks. IEEE Transactions on Circuits and Systems I: Regular Papers, 57(3), 672–680.
- Lu, J., Kurths, J., Cao, J., Mahdavi, N., & Huang, C. (2012). Synchronization control for nonlinear stochastic dynamical networks: Pinning impulsive strategy. IEEE Transactions on Neural Networks and Learning Systems, 23(2), 285–292.
