= Fakiha Heakal =

Egyptian physical chemist

Fakiha Mohamed El-Tayeb Heikal is an Egyptian professor of physical chemistry at the University of Cairo and a Fellow of the African Academy of Sciences.

== Career ==
Fakiha started her career as a teaching assistant in 1965 at the University of Cairo and published her first paper in 1970. She currently has over ninety publications in international journals and was rated top two percent women scientists in October 2020 by Stanford University.

== Fellowship ==
Fakiha Heakal was elected as a Fellow of the African Academy of Sciences (AAS) in 2022.

== Awards ==
In 2008 and 2012, Fakiha won both the Cairo University and State University Award of Excellence in Basic science. In 2017, she won the Cairo University Award in Advanced Technological Sciences. In 2021, she won the Kwame Nkrumah Award for Scientific Excellence.
