= Anthony Youdeowei =

Nigerian academic

- Born: 7 April 1937 (age 88); Abari, Delta State, Nigeria.
- Citizenship: Nigeria
- Occupation(s): Academician; Scientist

Anthony Youdeowei is a Nigerian professor of Agricultural Entomology. He was acting vice chancellor, dean and executive chairman at the University of Ibadan Publishing House. He is a founding fellow of the African Academy of Sciences and The World Academy of Sciences.

== Early life and education ==
Youdeowei was born on 7 April 1937 in Abari, Delta State, Nigeria. He earned his first degree in Zoology from the University College of Ibadan (now University of Ibadan) in 1962 and a PhD in Agricultural Entomology in 1967 from the University of London.

== Career ==
=== Academic career ===
Youdeowei became a lecturer at the Department of Agricultural Biology in 1973 and a professor in 1990. During his academic career, he was a Head of the Department of Agricultural Biology, Dean of the Faculty of Agriculture and Forestry, Acting Vice Chancellor and Executive Director of the University of Ibadan Publishing House.

=== Scientific career ===
Youdeowei joined West Africa Rice Development Association (WARDA, now Africa Rice) located in Bouaké in the Ivory Coast as a Director of Training and Communications. In 1997, he moved to Africa Regional Office of the Food and Agriculture Organization of the United Nations (FAO) located in Accra, Ghana, as a Consultant Senior Integrated Pest Management Specialist. He became a member of the Governing Council of ICIPE, the International Centre of Insect Physiology and Ecology Nairobi, Kenya in 2010.
