= German University in Cairo =

Private university in New Cairo, Egypt

- الجامعة الألمانية بالقاهرة
- Other names: GUC
- Type: Private
- Established: 2002
- Academic affiliations: ACQUIN
- Chairman: Dr. Ashraf Mansour
- President: Dr. Yasser Hegazy
- Total staff: 743
- Students: 12,947
- Location: New Cairo, Egypt and Berlin, Germany
- Campus: 577 000 m²; Urban
- Website: guc.edu.eg

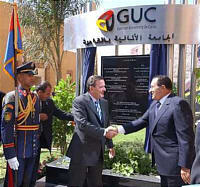
The inauguration ceremony of the GUC in 2003, attended by then-president Hosni Mubarak and German Chancellor Gerhard Schröder.

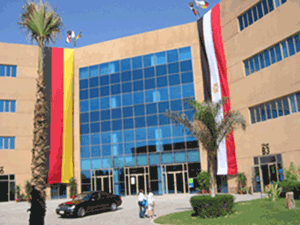
Main campus in New Cairo.

The German University in Cairo (abbreviated to GUC; Arabic: الجامعة الألمانية بالقاهرة El Gam‘a El Almāniya Bel Qāhira) is a private non-profit university in New Cairo, Egypt. GUC was founded in 2002 by the presidential decree 27/2002 and according to the Egyptian law number 101/1992. The University of Stuttgart, the University of Ulm, the University of Tübingen, the University of Mannheim, the Academy of Fine Arts Leipzig, the German Academic Exchange Service (DAAD), the State of Baden-Württemberg, Germany, and the Federal Ministry of Education and Research, Germany, are among the main academic supporters of the GUC.

GUC offers more than 70 study programs leading to the degrees of B.Sc., M.Sc. and Ph.D. according to the Bologna Process. The language of instruction is English. The study programs are designed according to German standards and are accredited in Egypt and Germany (by ACQUIN). Far more than 10,000 students are enrolled at GUC, which has become the largest transnational education institute from the German perspective.

GUC is located in the Southeast of Cairo. The campus of 577.000 m^{2} includes various sports facilities, an industry park, a solar park as well as state-of-the-art laboratories for the integration of education, research and application. GUC also operates a guesthouse in Ulm and a campus in Berlin as well as multiple student support offices in Germany with the aim of fostering the mobility of students, researchers and instructors to Germany.

== Governance ==
The German University in Cairo embraces the faculties of Information Engineering & Technology, Media Engineering & Technology, Engineering & Material Sciences, Management Technology, Pharmacy & Biotechnology, Applied Sciences & Arts, Law and Legal Studies as well as Postgraduate Studies & Scientific Research.

Based on its charter the university is independent and self-governing: the board of trustees is in charge of basic oversight, and independently, the University Council advises the university president and vice presidents on academic matters. Personalities from Germany and Egypt serve on both committees. Members of the Board of Trustees include:

- Ashraf Mansour (chairman; GUC Prime Founder)
- Dieter Fritsch (Vice Chairman of Board of Trustees for Academic Affairs & Former Rector, University of Stuttgart)
- Peter Frankenberg (Former Minister of Science, Research and Arts, Baden-Württemberg)
- Cyril Nunn (German Ambassador to Egypt)
- Annette Schavan (Former Federal Minister of Education and Research, Germany)
- Wolfram Ressel (Rector, University of Stuttgart)
- Michael Weber (Rector, University of Ulm)
- Karl Joachim Ebeling (Former Rector, University of Ulm)
- Dorothea Rüland (General Secretary, DAAD (German Academic Exchange Service))
- Ibrahim El-Dimeery (Former Egyptian Minister of Transport & Dean of Faculty of Postgraduate Studies)
- Gamal Nada (Judge, Former President of the Egyptian State's Council)
- Ulrich Zürn (Partner at Dr. Horn Economic Consultancy & Chartered Accountant, Ulm)

== Public Perception ==
The German Government supports the development of German study programmes and the foundation of universities abroad based on the German model. The Federal Foreign Office lists GUC first among the ten educational institutions currently being promoted.

The German Federal Ministry of Education and Research sees the GUC, above all, in the continuity of German-Egyptian educational cooperation. "The first ‘German’ private university abroad (established as a private institution under Egyptian law) is of great political importance in the longstanding tradition of German-Egyptian education cooperation, which started more than a hundred years ago when German parochial schools were established in Cairo and Alexandria."

The German Academic Exchange Service recognizes the GUC as one of the "outstanding transnational education projects" and estimates that some 250 to 300 GUC graduates are concurrently doing master's or doctoral degrees in Germany.
