= Rajaâ Cherkaoui El Moursli =

Moroccan physicist

- Born: 12 May 1954 (age 72); Salé, Morocco
- Education: Doctorate in physics at the Laboratoire de Physique subatomique et cosmologie, Grenoble, France which was part of the Joseph Fourier University
- Alma mater: Lycée Descartes, Rabat
- Occupation: Nuclear physicist
- Employer: Mohammad V University of Rabat's Faculty of Science
- Known for: Raising the level of Moroccan research by setting up the first Master's Degree in Medical Physics
- Awards: The L'Oréal-UNESCO Awards for Women in Science for Africa and the Arab states in 2015

Rajaâ Cherkaoui El Moursli (born 12 May 1954) is a Moroccan Professor of nuclear physics, at the faculty of science within the Mohammad V University of Rabat. She won the L'Oréal-UNESCO Awards for Women in Science for her work on the Higgs Boson.

== Life ==
Rajaâ Cherkaoui El Moursli

El Moursli was born in Salé in 1954. She obtained her first degree in mathematics at Lycée Descartes, Rabat. She had to argue the case then with her father to be a girl who would leave conservative Morocco to study further. She says that Neil Armstrong's achievements and a high school teacher inspired her. She went to study in Grenoble in France where she obtained her doctorate in physics at the Laboratoire de Physique subatomique et cosmologie which was part of the Joseph Fourier University. In 1982, she returned to Rabat.

In 2015, she was awarded the L'Oréal-UNESCO Awards for Women in Science for Africa and the Arab states. The award cited her contribution to the proof of the existence of the Higgs Boson. This particle is responsible for the creation of mass. El Moursli is credited with raising the level of Moroccan research, because she set up the first master's degree in medical physics.

The ATLAS experiment congratulated her for her award, and her part in the Higgs boson's discovery. She was a vice-president of the African Academy of Sciences and its governing council led by Prof Lise Korsten.
