= Ole Tholstrup =

Ole Tholstrup (1930-1991) was a wealthy Danish industrialist with interests in the Kosan a/s conglomerate.

Tholstrup was the son of the industrialist Knud Tholstrup, who founded Kosan a/s, and his wife Eva Helen Brødsgård.

Ole Tholstrup died from alcoholism in 1991.
