= Middle Zambezi Biosphere Reserve =

- Location within Africa
- Location: Zimbabwe
- Coordinates: 15°55′S 29°26′E
- Area: 2,879,300 hectares (11,117 sq mi)
- Established: 2010
- Governing body: Parks and Wildlife Management Authority

The Middle Zambezi Biosphere Reserve (established 2010) is a UNESCO Biosphere Reserve located along the Zambezi River in the Zambezi Valley of Zimbabwe. The 2,879,300 hectares (11,117 sq mi) reserve consists of riverine and terrestrial ecosystems unique to the subcontinent. Among threatened species found in the valley are the black rhino (Diceros bicornis), the painted wild dog (Lycaon pictus), and the nyala (Tragelaphus angasii). The flora consist of Colophospermum/Combretum/Terminalia woodland and the Zambezi riparian forest. At Mana Pools, it comprises the only flood plain ecosystem left in the Middle Zambezi.

As of 2011, the total human population is about 40,600, with the major population in the urban area in the Biosphere Reserve and the CAMPFIRE buffer zones. The core zones have only Park staff people, while the safari areas contain less than 50 people at any time, comprising mainly sport hunters and their hosts.

Land Management units comprise the two core areas and 11 buffer zone areas.

== Sources ==
This article incorporates text from a free content work (license statement/permission). Text taken from UNESCO - MAB Biosphere Reserves Directory, UNESCO, UNESCO.
