= Jane Catherine Ngila =

Kenyan chemist

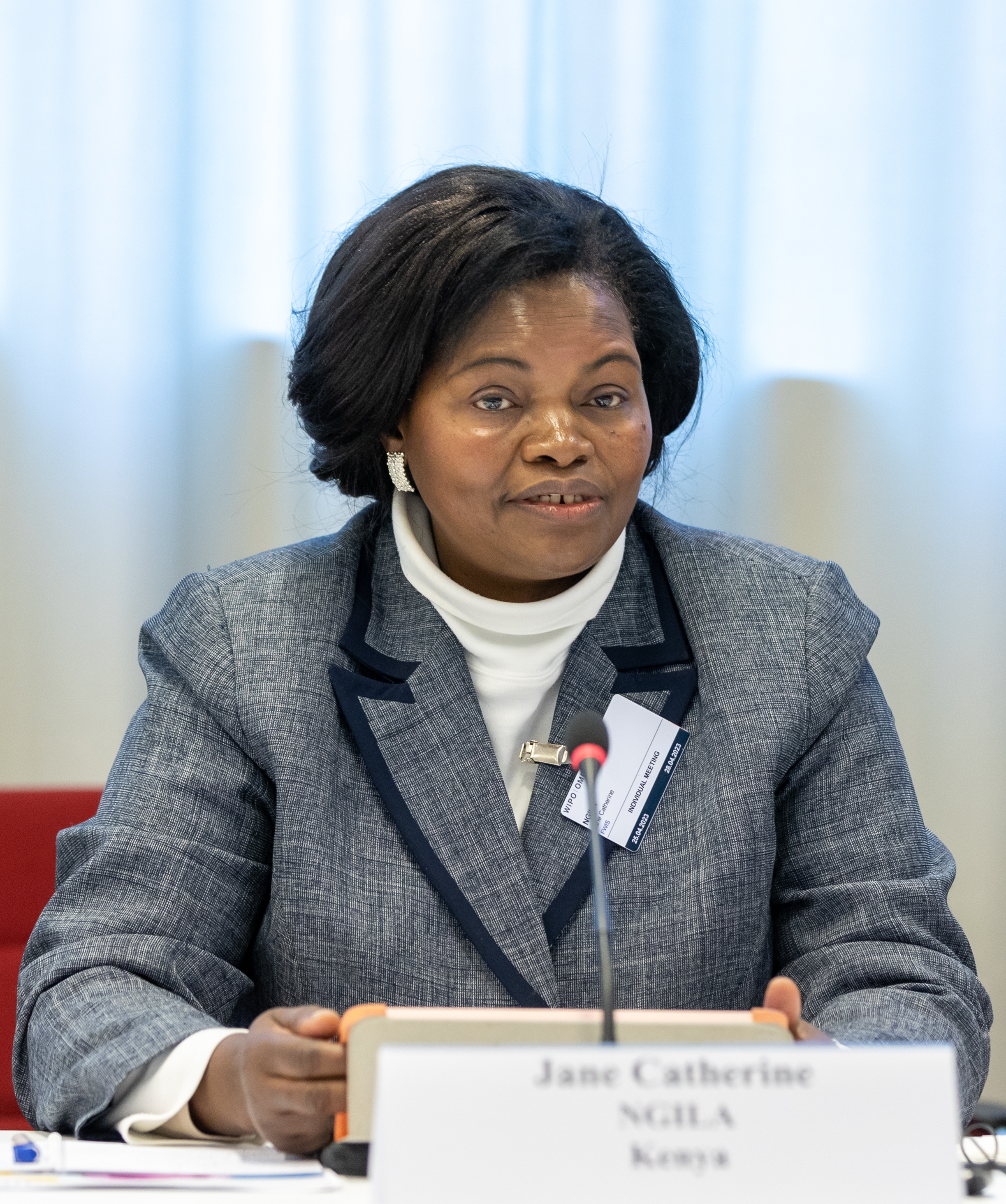
- Education: Kenyatta University; University of New South Wales
- Scientific career
- Fields: Chemistry
- Workplaces: University of Johannesburg; Deputy Vice Chancellor, Academic Affairs, Riara University, Nairobi, Kenya
- Website: Jane Catherine Ngila

Jane Catherine Ngila is the head of the Chemical Sciences Department at the University of Johannesburg, her work focuses on applying nanotechnology for water purification. She was the Acting Executive Director of the African Academy of Sciences and member of the Academy of Science of South Africa.

== Career ==
Ngila obtained her B.Ed. in 1986 and M.Sc. in chemistry in 1992 from Kenyatta University in Nairobi, Kenya. She was awarded a scholarship, AIDAB/EMSS scholarship, by the Australian government. Ngila obtained her PhD in analytical-environmental chemistry from the University of New South Wales, Australia in 1996. She started her career as a tutor in the chemistry department at Kenyatta University in 1989, and was appointed as a lecturer in 1996. She later worked at the University of Botswana (1998–2006) and then as a senior lecturer at the University of KwaZulu-Natal (2006–2011) before being appointed a professorship of applied chemistry at the University of Johannesburg in 2011. Ngila has been a deputy director at the Morendat Institute of Oil & Gas (MIOG), Kenya Pipeline Company.

Ngila serves as a UNU council member and is the executive director of the African Foundation for Women and Youth in Education, Science, Technology and Innovation. In 2025 she was a vice-President of the African Academy of Sciences and its governing council led by Prof Lise Korsten.

== Research ==
Ngila's work is in the field of analytical environmental chemistry; her research interests include monitoring water quality/pollution and water purification using chemical resins and other adsorbents. Ngila is an author or co-author of over 150 papers and review articles. Her current h-index is 38.

== Awards and honors ==
- 2016 African Union Kwame Nkrumah Award for Scientific Excellence.
- 2021 L'Oréal-UNESCO For Women in Science Award.
- 2025 IUPAC Distinguished Women in Chemistry and Chemical Engineering.
- 2025 Royal Society of Chemistry Honorary Fellowship.
