= Erik Thulstrup =

Danish chemist (died 2019)

Erik Waaben Thulstrup (died September 2019) was a Danish chemist.

Lehto earned his PhD in 1970 from the Aarhus University. He was an associate professor at Aarhus University from 1972 to 1981, professor at the Danish School of Education from 1981 to 1989, and lastly at Roskilde University from 1993. In between he headed the World Bank Science and Technology for Development program from 1990 to 1993.

He was a fellow of The World Academy of Sciences from 1996, of the Norwegian Academy of Science and Letters from 1999 as well as the Mongolian Academy of Sciences and African Academy of Sciences.
