= Garth April =

South African rugby union player

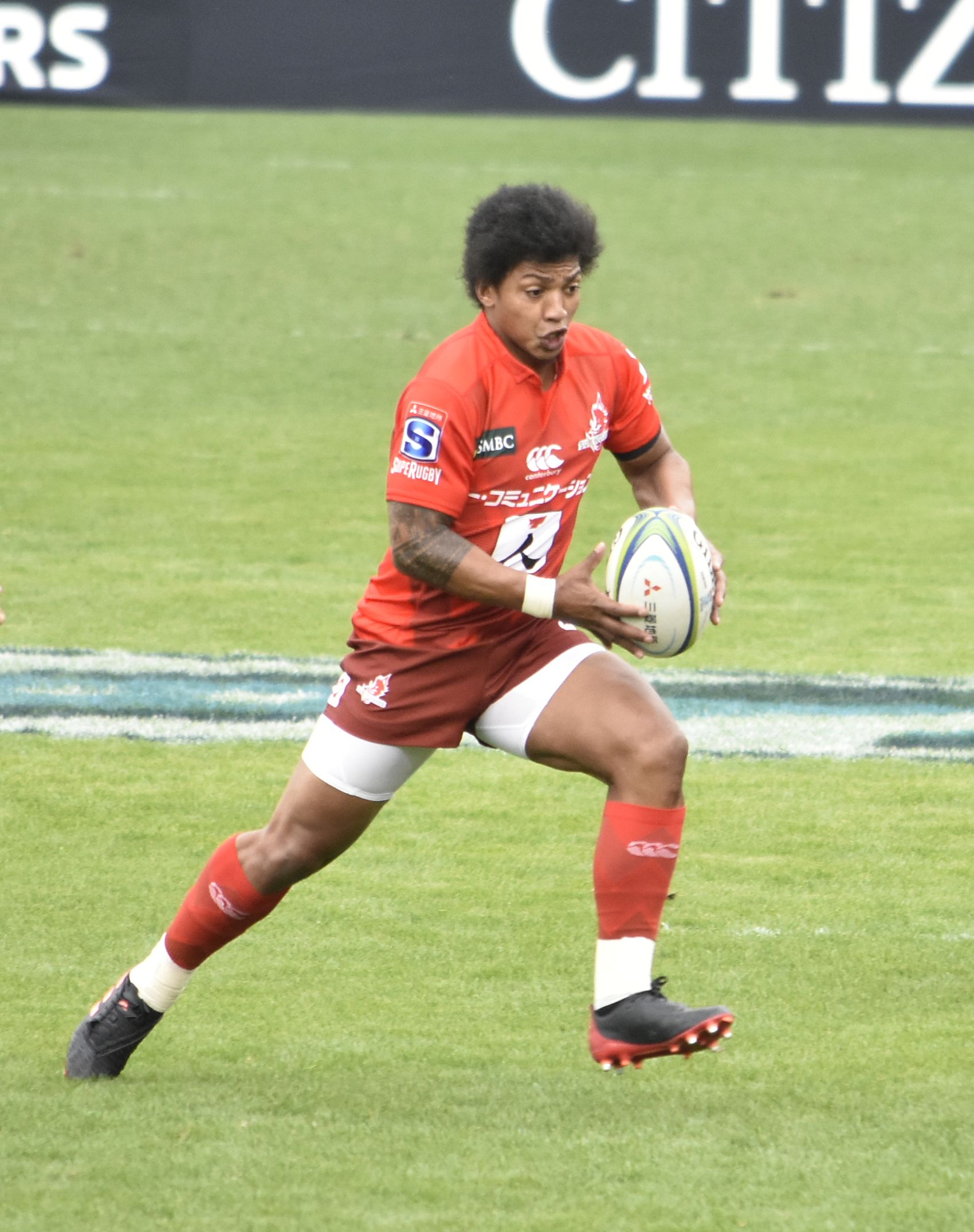
- Full name: Garth Graham April
- Born: 16 July 1991 (age 35) Cape Town, South Africa
- Height: 1.78 m (5 ft 10 in)
- Weight: 80 kg (12 st 8 lb; 176 lb)
- School: Hoërskool Florida, Roodepoort
- Notable relative: Brendon April (brother)

Rugby union career
- Position: Fullback / Fly-half / Centre
Youth career
- 2007–2008: Boland Cavaliers
- 2009–2012: Golden Lions
Amateur team(s)
Years	Team	Apps	(Points)
2015	Durbanville-Bellville	7	(40)
Senior career
Years	Team	Apps	(Points)
2012	Golden Lions XV	5	(10)
2013–2014	Boland Cavaliers	6	(4)
2015	Western Province	2	(5)
2015–2018	Sharks XV	13	(120)
2015–2017	Sharks (Currie Cup)	21	(41)
2016–2018	Sharks	21	(97)
2018–2019	NTT Communications Shining Arcs	8	(38)
2020	Sunwolves	5	(34)
2021–2023	Shimizu Blue Sharks	10	(27)
- Correct as of 22 February 2021
International career
Years	Team	Apps	(Points)
2008	South Africa Schools		
2016	South Africa 'A'	1	(3)
- Correct as of 10 June 2016

Garth Graham April (born 16 July 1991) is a South African rugby union player who most recently played for the NTT Communications Shining Arcs in the Top League in Japan. His regular position is fullback, but he can also play as a fly-half or centre.

== Career ==
=== Boland ===
April grew up in the Western Cape and earned his first provincial call-up in 2007, when he represented Boland in the Under-16 Grant Khomo Week competition. In 2008, he was selected to play for them in the premier high school rugby union competition in South Africa, the Under-18 Craven Week held in Pretoria. He was also selected in an Under-18 Elite squad and eventually the South African Schools side in the same year.

=== Golden Lions ===
April moved to Gauteng in 2009 where he finished his schooling at Hoërskool Florida in Roodepoort. He once again played at the Craven Week tournament, this time representing the Golden Lions in the 2009 edition held in Welkom and was included in a South African Under-18 High Performance squad later in the same year. He was also included in the Golden Lions U19 squad for the 2009 Under-19 Provincial Championship.

After finishing school, April joined the Golden Lions on a three-year contract and once again played for the Golden Lions U19s in the Under-19 Provincial Championship in 2010. He moved up an age group and represented the Golden Lions U21s in the 2011 Under-21 Provincial Championship, although his game-time was limited, just making two appearances from the bench.

In 2012, April was included in the Golden Lions' squad for the 2012 Vodacom Cup. He made his first class debut in their match against the Leopards in Potchefstroom, starting their 16–23 defeat in the opening round of the competition. He also started their 10–49 defeat to trans-Jukskei River rivals the Blue Bulls in Pretoria. His third appearance for the Golden Lions was in their match against Griquas in Kimberley; he played off the bench in the first half and scored the decisive try (his first in senior rugby) thirteen minutes from the end to help his side to a 35–30 victory to hand Griquas their only victory over the regular season. April also played in the 33–37 loss to the Pumas in Johannesburg as his side finished in fourth spot to qualify for the quarter finals. He scored a late try in the quarter final against Western Province, but it ended up being a mere consolation try, with Western Province advancing to the semi-finals by winning the match 58–34. In the latter half of the year, April represented the Golden Lions U21s in the 2012 Under-21 Provincial Championship, establishing himself as their first-choice fullback, starting in that position on eight occasions. He scored five tries and fourteen points with the boot to end the campaign as the Golden Lions' second-highest point scorer behind regular kicker Marais Schmidt.

=== Boland Cavaliers ===
April wasn't retained by the Golden Lions after the 2012 and he returned to the Western Cape to join the team he represented at youth level, the Boland Cavaliers. He made four appearances for them during the 2013 Vodacom Cup competition, scoring four points, and twice during the 2014 Vodacom Cup competition. However, a serious knee injury curtailed his progress at Boland and he was released at the end of 2014.

=== Durbanville-Bellville / Western Province ===
April joined Western Province amateur club side Durbanville-Bellville, who finished fourth in the Western Province Super League A and won through a series of play-offs to qualify for the 2015 SARU Community Cup. He played in all seven of their matches during the competition and helped his side all the way to the final, despite being the last team to qualify. His contributions proved decisive in the final against hosts and defending champions Rustenburg Impala, scoring Durbanville-Bellville's opening try of the match and kicking two conversions and two penalties for a personal haul of 15 points in their 31–30 victory, to secure the title for his side for the first time. After the competition, April was also named as the Young Player of the Tournament.

This also earned him another provincial call-up, with Western Province including him in their squad for the 2015 Vodacom Cup. He made his debut for Western Province in their Round Four match against the Border Bulldogs and took just 25 to score his first try in Western Province colours, setting them on their way to a 34–6 win.

=== Sharks ===
In April 2015, it was announced that April signed a two-year contract with Durban-based side the Sharks.

=== International rugby ===
On 28 May 2016, April was included in a 31-man South Africa squad for their three-test match series against a touring Ireland team. After training with the national team for a few days, he joined the South Africa 'A' squad for their two-match series against a touring England Saxons team. He was named in the starting line-up for their first match in Bloemfontein and opened the scoring for his team by converting a penalty in the tenth minute of the match, but ended on the losing side as the visitors ran out 32–24 winners.

== Personal ==
April is the younger brother of rugby player Brendon April.
