= Felix Dapare Dakora =

Plant biologist

Felix Dapare Dakora FAAS, FASSAf
- Born: Felix Dapare Dakora; 14 November 1952 (age 73); Ghana
- Education: University of Ghana (BSc); University of Sydney (MSc); University of Western Australia (PhD)
- Known for: Study of legume/rhizobium symbiosis
- Awards: UNESCO-Equatorial Guinea International Prize for Research African Union Kwame Nkrumah Continental Science Award
- Scientific career
- Fields: Biological Nitrogen Fixation
- Workplaces: Tshwane University of Technology
- Doctoral advisor: Craig Atkins and John Pate

Felix Dapare Dakora, FAAS, FASSAf is a Ghanaian plant biologist investigating biological nitrogen fixation at the Tshwane University of Technology in South Africa. He currently serves as President of The African Academy of Sciences for the 2017–2023 terms. Dakora was awarded the UNESCO-Equatorial Guinea International Prize for Research in the Life Sciences and the African Union Kwame Nkrumah Scientific Award. Dakora is a Fellow of the Academy of Science of South Africa.

== Academic career ==
Dakora studied agriculture at the University of Ghana, obtaining his BSc (Hons) degree in 1977. After a year at Ghana's Crops Research Institute, he moved to the University of Sydney, Australia, to study microbiology, obtaining an MSc degree. Returning to Nyankpala in Northern Ghana to the Savanna Agricultural Research Institute, Dakora continued researching the role of symbiotic legumes in nitrogen fixation. In 1985 Dakora moved from Ghana to Perth, Western Australia to study for a PhD in botany at the University of Western Australia, Perth. Following the award of his PhD in 1989, Dakora moved to the Smithsonian Institution, Washington, D.C., and later to University of California, Davis. In 1993 Dakora became a lecturer in the botany department at the University of Cape Town. In 2002 Dakora became professor and executive dean of research development and technology promotion, Cape Technikon, Cape Town. He holds a South African Research Chair in agrochemurgy and plant symbioses at Tshwane University of Technology.

== Research interests ==
Dakora first studied fast‐growing bacteria from nodules of cowpea at the University of Sydney. Throughout his career Dakora has published over 400 papers covering the roles of legume signalling molecules, and legumes and their associated microbes which fertilize crops and are tolerant of drought, acidic and salty soils and high temperatures. Dakora has also studied microbes which can help overcome micronutrient deficiency in Africa and methods of sustainable agriculture.

== Awards and honours ==
- UNESCO-Equatorial Guinea International Prize for Research in the Life Sciences, 2012
- Fellow of the African Academy of Sciences, 2014
- African Union Kwame Nkrumah Continental Science Award, 2016
- Elected President of the African Academy of Sciences, 2017
- Fellow of The World Academy of Sciences, 2018
- Foreign member of the Chinese Academy of Engineering, 2019
