= Burma Valley, Zimbabwe =

Valley in Zimbabwe

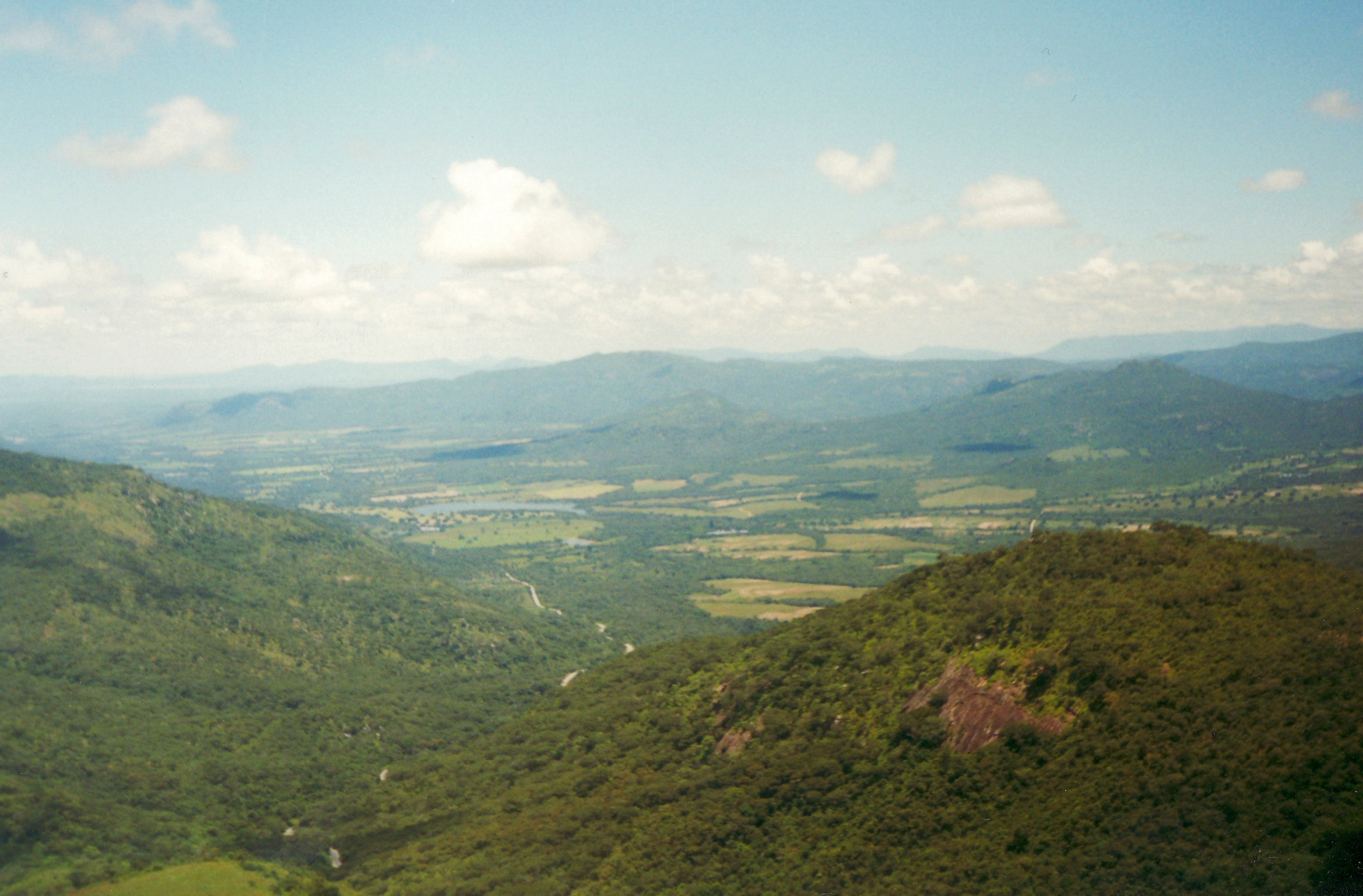
Burma Valley, Zimbabwe

Burma Valley is a low-lying area on the border between Zimbabwe and Mozambique, located southeast of the Bvumba Mountains. The main tarred road from Mutare leads through the mountains, reaching communal farmlands of Chigodora and then passes down into Burma Valley.

The valley is rainy and fertile and was used by European colonists for use as tobacco and fruit growing land. There are still a number of large commercial farms in the valley. During the independence war, a tarred road was built from Mutare into the valley for the easy movement of Rhodesian forces, who were helping to protect the farmers of the area.

More recently, some of the commercial farm land in the area has been re-allocated as part of the government's land reform programme.
