= Quinne Brown =

South African actress

- Born: Quinne Brown; 9 June 1979 (age 47); Johannesburg, South Africa
- Education: University of Johannesburg
- Occupation: Actress
- Years active: 2001–present
- Height: 1.7 m (5 ft 7 in)
- Spouse: Ryan Huffman (m. 2006)
- Children: 2

Quinne Brown (born 9 June 1979) is a South African actress. She is best known for her roles in the films Ouma se Slim Kind, Sedona's Rule and This Is Charlotte King.

== Personal life ==
Brown was born in Johannesburg, South Africa. After matriculating, she studied geography and anthropology at the University of Johannesburg.

She left for San Francisco in 2003 for her father's funeral, where she met her future husband, Ryan Huffman. She married him in 2006 and the couple lived in San Francisco. The couple later moved to San Diego, where they had their two daughters, Charlotte and Lara.

== Career ==
During her studies, Brown got the opportunity to join the cast of the soap opera, 7de Laan. In the series, she played the popular role Connie van der Lecq. Apart from acting, she is also worked as a presenter on the SABC2 talk show. In 2003, Brown took sabbatical leave from the series after her father's death in April 2003.

She also worked in theater, film and commercials based on San Francisco. In 2008, she started teaching children at an acting school for children. After ten years in United States, she returned to South Africa with the family. In 2016, she rejoined the cast of '7de Laan', and reprised her character 'Connie'.

== Filmography ==
Year	Film	Role	Genre	Ref.
2001-2003/2016-2022	7de Laan	Connie van der Lecq	TV series	
2007	Ouma se Slim Kind	Klaradyn	Film	
2007	Just Under a Million	Rachel	Short film	
2007	A Clean, Well-Lighted Place	Young Woman	Short film	
2008	The Shadow of Evil	Doris	Short film	
2010	This Is Charlotte King	Charlotte King	Short film	
2010	Sedona's Rule	Irene	Film	
2010	Nominated	Eye on Hollywood Host	Film	
2011	Homeward Bound	Nicole	Short film	
2013	Lifeless	Janice	Film	
2021-2022	Dokter Ali	Selvi	TV series	
