= African Academy of Sciences =

Academy of sciences in Africa

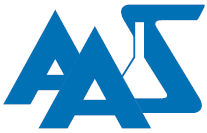
- Formation: 1985; 41 years ago
- Professional title: Fellow of the African Academy of Sciences (FAAS)
- Headquarters: Nairobi, Kenya
- Coordinates: 1.312136°S 36.709781°E
- Region served: Africa
- Members: 555
- President: Lise Korsten
- Website: www.aasciences.africa

The African Academy of Sciences (AAS) is a non-aligned, non-political, not-for-profit, pan-African learned society formed in 1985.

The AAS elects fellows (FAAS) and affiliates. The AAS also awards the Obasanjo Prize for Scientific Discovery and Technological Innovation every two years to an outstanding scientist who contributed to the development of the continent.

== History ==
The Academy was founded in 1983 following a proposal presented by entomologist Thomas Odhiambo and Mohamed H.A. Hassan (The World Academy of Sciences president at the time) at the inaugural meeting of The World Academy of Sciences (TWAS), in Trieste, Italy.

Odhiambo led a taskforce on the creation of The Academy, which presented its recommendations at a meeting convened on 10 December 1985. Participants at the meeting unanimously adopted the recommendations, turned the gathering into a General Assembly, and drafted and adopted the Academy's founding constitution, which has since been updated. The 34 participants who attended the General Assembly also became the founding fellows of the Academy.

The Academy also developed and implemented four strategies between 1989 and 2005 that focused on forestry research, biotechnology, soil and water management, improved food production and policy and advocacy. In 1988 the AAS launched the journal Discovery and Innovation, which focused on all areas of science and ran until 2012.

At first the Academy was largely unfunded and run by volunteers. Between 1993 and 1996 Carnegie Corporation of New York and the Rockefeller Foundation helped the organization establish efficient institutional and financial systems. In May 2005 the Kenyan government gave official recognition to the Academy and extended to it diplomatic privileges given to international non governmental organisations headquartered in Kenya. It also authorized construction of its headquarters on a 2 hectares (4.9 acres) site that it owns in the Karen area of Nairobi. A US$5 million endowment from the Nigerian government was used to cover the cost of construction.

On 28 February 2011 Ahmadou Lamine Ndiaye of Senegal was appointed President of the AAS for a three-year term replacing Mohamed Hassan of Sudan. Ndiaye said he wanted to rejuvenate the AAS, and felt that conditions were favorable. He aimed to open up centers of excellence on the continent where French and English speakers could work on joint research programs.

Felix Dapare Dakora was the President of the African Academy of Sciences from 2017 when he was succeeded by Lise Korsten in August 2023. She became the first woman to lead the academy. The academy should she believes be widely recognised as a leader in African sciences. She led the academy's new governing council of ten people and three of these Jane Catherine Ngila, Rajaâ Cherkaoui El Moursli and Peggy Oti-Boateng who was the executive director from 2022 are also women. She will be President until 2026. Kortsen took over the leadership of the academy after a difficult period. The academy had found that its staff and budget had grown to 60 staff controlling $250m supported by the Wellcome Trust and the Bill and Melinda Gates Foundation. Internal disagreements led to the loss of the academy's financial supporters. Korsten and her executive secretary had to re-establish the academy's role.

== Governance ==
The AAS is governed by:

- A general assembly that consists of AAS fellows and is the highest authority of the academy, which determines its general policy and has an oversight of the governing council.
- A governing council consisting of officers elected by the general assembly. The governing council meets twice a year to create and review the Academy's programmes.

=== Current members of the Governing Council ===
As of 2024, the governing council of the academy has the following members:

- Lise Korsten, President
- Friday Okonofua, Secretary General
- Agong Stephen Gaya, Treasurer
- Rajaa Cherkaoui, Vice President, North Africa
- Juma Shabani, Vice President, Eastern Africa
- Godfrey Tangwa, Vice President, Central Africa
- Paco Serme, Vice President, Western Africa
- Ozoemena Kenneth, Vice President, Southern Africa
- Jean Koulidiati, Director, African Union Commission for Human Resources, Science and Technology
- Mary Abukutsa-Onyango, Member
- Raphael Munavu, Member
- Peggy Oti-Boateng, Executive Director

=== Previous Presidents ===
- 1985–1998 Thomas R. Odhiambo
- 1999–2010 Mohamed H.A. Hassan
- 2011–2013 Ahmadou Lamine Ndiaye
- 2014–2016 Aderemi Kuku
- 2017–2023 Felix Dapare Dakora
- 2024– Lise Korsten

== Fellows ==
The African Academy of Sciences fellows (FAAS) are Africans who may live in or outside the continent and are working on science in Africa. FAAS are elected by previously elected AAS fellows based on achievements that include their publication record, innovations, leadership roles and contribution to policy. Fellows form a community of scientists to engage with governments and policy makers to enable wise investment in and for the future of the continent.

As of November 2022, the AAS has 555 fellows. From which 35 who are founding fellows who were all elected during the AAS inception, 20 honorary fellows, 60 associate fellows (i.e., non founding and honorary fellows from outside the continent), and 440 Fellows with 19.3% female fellows (in 2022).

=== Founding Fellows ===
35 fellows, all elected at AAS inception in 1985 except Henry Fadamiro who was elected in 2020.

1. Henri Hogbe Nlend, Cameroon
2. Jean Nya-Ngatchou, Cameroon
3. Victor Doulou, DRC
4. Félix Malu wa Kalenga, DRC
5. Jerome Dinga-Reassi, DRC
6. Mohamed Kamel Mahmoud, Egypt
7. Attia Ashour, Egypt
8. Ebenezer Laing, Ghana
9. Francis Allotey, Ghana
10. Daniel Adzei Bekoe, Ghana
11. Robert Butler, Ghana
12. Emmanuel Evans-Anfom, Ghana
13. Ashitey Trebi-Ollennu, Ghana
14. Edward S. Ayensu, Ghana
15. Fred Wangati, Kenya
16. Thomas R. Odhiambo, Kenya
17. Samson Gombe, Kenya
18. Raoelina Andriambololona, Madagascar
19. Thomas Adeoye Lambo, Madagascar
20. Albert Rakoto Ratsimamanga, Madagascar
21. Mahdi Elmandjra, Morocco
22. Anthony Youdeowei, Nigeria
23. Donald Efiong Udo Ekong, Nigeria
24. Jibril Aminu, Nigeria
25. Moctar Toure, Senegal
26. Toure M. Saydil, Senegal
27. Mohamed H.A. Hassan, Sudan
28. Yahia Abdel Mageed, Sudan
29. Ahmed K. Bashir, Sudan
30. Awadh S. Mawenya, Tanzania
31. L. K. Shayo, Tanzania
32. Djodji Akoly Nyatepe-Coo, Togo
33. Itai Chiri, Zimbabwe
34. Christopher Magadza, Zimbabwe
35. Henry Fadamiro, United States

=== Honorary Fellows ===
As of October 2024, there are 20 honorary fellows. The first was admitted in 2011.

1. Olusegun Obasanjo, Nigeria (2011)
2. Denis Sassou Nguesso, Democratic Republic of the Congo (2014)
3. Khama Ian Khama, Botswana (2016)
4. Grace Naledi Mandisa Pandor, South Africa (2018)
5. Ashraf Mansour, Egypt (2018)
6. Mamphela Aletta Ramphele, South Africa (2018)
7. Khotso David Kenneth Mokhele, South Africa (2018)
8. Strive Masiyiwa, Zimbabwe (2018)
9. Ibrahim Assane Mayaki, Niger (2018)
10. Carlos Lopes, Guinea-Bissau (2018)
11. Meodas Carlos, Mozambique (2018)
12. Eddah Gachukia, Kenya (2018)
13. Patrick Loch Otieno Lumumba, (2018)
14. Richard Erskine Leakey, Kenya (2019)
15. Mary Chinery-Hesse, Ghana (2019)
16. Thulisile Madonsela, South Africa (2019)
17. Graça Machel, Mozambique (2019)
18. Jean Albergel, Tunisia (2021)
19. A.K. Tyagi, India (2021)
20. Alain Krief, Tunisia (2021)

=== Associate Fellows ===
As of October 2024, there are 60 associate fellows, which are non-founding or honorary fellows from outside the continent.

1. Giovanni Battista Marini Bettolo Marconi, Italy (1987)
2. Abdus Salam, Pakistan (1987)
3. William A.C Mathieson, United Kingdom (1989)
4. Walter E. Massey, United States (1991)
5. Chintamani Nagesa Ramachandra Rao, India (2001)
6. Govindapillai Achuthan Nair, India (2006)
7. Mortelmans Jos, United Kingdom (2006)
8. Katepalli Raju Sreenivasan, India (2006)
9. Donald Adams, United States (2009)
10. Erik Thulstrup, Denmark (2009)
11. Cato Thomas Laurencin, United States (2009)
12. Christian Borgemeister, Germany (2011)
13. Zeyaur Rahman Khan, India (2012)
14. Gerhard Bringmann, Germany (2013)
15. Peter K. Neuenschwander, Switzerland (2013)
16. Joachim von Braun, Germany (2014)
17. Zhang Linqi, China (2015)
18. Kevin Marsh, United Kingdom (2015)
19. Eleanor N. Fish, Canada (2015)
20. Dorairajan Balasubramanian, India (2015)
21. Bill S. Hansson, Sweden (2016)
22. Brenda Wingfield, Ireland (2016)
23. Don A. Cowan, New Zealand (2016)
24. Federico Rosei, Italy (2017)
25. George Fu Gao, China (2017)
26. Alison Elliott, United Kingdom (2017)
27. Bert Klumperman, Netherlands (2017)
28. Kadambot Siddique, Australia (2018)
29. Snow Robert, United Kingdom (2018)
30. Marleen Temmerman, Belgium (2018)
31. Marcel Tanner, Switzerland (2018)
32. Jinde Cao, China (2019)
33. Lars Hviid, Denmark (2019)
34. Mark Edward John Woolhouse, United Kingdom (2019)
35. Catherine Molyneux, United Kingdom (2019)
36. Christian Pirk, Germany (2019)
37. Dumitru Baleanu, Romania (2019)
38. Mohamed Henini, United Kingdom (2020)
39. Newton Lupwayi, Canada (2020)
40. Le Kang, Pakistan (2020)
41. Jianbo Shen, China (2020)
42. Ann M Moormann, United States (2020)
43. Rodomiro Ortiz, Sweden (2020)
44. Tasawar Hayat, Pakistan (2020)
45. Kimani Toussaint, United States (2020)
46. Rajeev Kumar Varshney, India (2020)
47. Fengting Li, China (2020)
48. Deji Akinwande, United States (2020)
49. Kongming Wu, China (2020)
50. Fusuo Zhang, China (2020)
51. Tianyu Wang, China (2021)
52. Bruce Mellado, South Africa (2021)
53. Shuanggen Jin, China (2021)
54. Thalappil Pradeep, India (2021)
55. Huanming Yang, China (2021)
56. Leena Tripathi, India (2022)
57. Susan J. Elliott, Canada (2022)
58. Huijun Duan, China (2022)
59. Oladele Ogunseitan, United States (2022)
60. Lydia Roos, France (2022)
61. Fakiha Heakal, Egypt (2022)
