= Khotso Mokhele =

South African businessman and chancellor of the University of the Free State

- Born: Mokhele Khotso David Kenneth; Bloemfontein
- Citizenship: South Africa
- Education: University of Fort Hare; University of California, Davis; Johns Hopkins University; University of Pennsylvania
- Occupations: Researcher; Business man; Academician; Scientist
- Known for: Establishment of the Academy of Science of South Africa (ASSAF)
- Scientific career
- Workplaces: University of Fort Hare; University of Cape Town; Foundation for Research Development; Impala Platinum Holdings; Tiger Brands Ltd.; ArcelorMittal; African Oxygen Ltd; Adcock Ingram Holdings Ltd.; MTN Group

Mokhele Khotso David Kenneth is a businessman and the special advisor to the South African minister of science and technology. He is the chancellor of the University of the Free State, the founder and president of the South African National Research Foundation and Academy of Science of South Africa. He is the lead independent of non-executive director of MTN Group.

== Early life and education ==
Khotso Mokhele was born in Bloemfontein. He attended Moroka High School and he obtained his first degree in agriculture from the University of Fort Hare. He obtained his master's degree in Food Science and PhD in Microbiology from the University of California, Davis under the scholarship of the Fulbright-Hays Programme. After that, he did his postdoctoral fellowships at the Johns Hopkins University and the University of Pennsylvania in the USA. He has also received eight honorary degrees across South African Universities and the US.

== Career ==
=== Academic career ===
Khotso Mokhele began his career as a lecturer at the University of Fort Hare between 1987 and 1989 and spent two years at the University of Cape Town. In 1992 he joined Foundation for Research Development as one of its vice presidents and succeeded Dr Rein Arndt as the president in 1996.

=== Scientific career ===
He was one of the scientists that drafted the blueprint of science and technology in South Africa. He was the founder president of the Academy of Science of South Africa (ASSAF), a two-times member of the Advisory Council on Innovation to the Minister of Science and Technology and was also a vice-president of Scientific Planning and Review of the International Council for Science (ICSU)

=== Leadership and corporate career ===
Khotso Mokhele was a Non-Executive chairman at Impala Platinum Holdings Ltd., A Chairman of Tiger Brands Ltd., Chairman & chief executive officer at ArcelorMittal South Africa Ltd., Lead Independent non-executive director at African Oxygen Ltd., and Non-Executive chairman for Adcock Ingram Holdings Ltd. President & chief executive officer of National Research Foundation, President of Academy of Science of South Africa and President at National Research Foundation.

He is currently the Lead Independent non-executive director at MTN Group, Afrox Limited and a non-executive director of Hans Merensky Holdings (Pty) Limited

== Awards and honours ==
He was awarded the Chevalier of the Legion of Honour by the President of France. In 2009 he received the Technology Top 100 Lifetime Achievers Award and in 2015 he received the Science Diplomacy Award from the Minister of Science and Technology in South Africa.
