= Doumbia =

Doumbia is an African surname that may refer to:

- Abdou Doumbia, French footballer (born 1990)
- Almamy Doumbia, Ivorian footballer (born 1983)
- Cleopatra Doumbia-Henry, President of the World Maritime University
- Idrissa Doumbia, Ivorian footballer (born 1998)
- Issa Doumbia, various people
- Kamory Doumbia, Malian footballer (born 2003)
- Mahamadou Doumbia, Malian footballer (born 2004)
- Mamadou Doumbia, various people
- Mama Koite Doumbia, Malian politician (born 1950)
- Mariam Doumbia, Malian singer (born 1958)
- Moussa Doumbia, Burkinabé footballer (born 1989)
- Moussa Doumbia, Malian footballer (born 1994)
- Sadio Doumbia, French tennis player (born 1990)
- Sékou Doumbia, Ivorian footballer (born 1994)
- Seydou Doumbia, Ivorian footballer (born 1987)
- Souleyman Doumbia, Ivorian footballer (born 1996)
- Tongo Doumbia, Malian footballer (born 1989)
- Yahiya Doumbia, Senegalese tennis player (born 1963)
