= Obioma Nwaorgu =

Nigerian parasitologist and epidemiologist (born 1948)

- Born: Obioma Chebechi Okolo; 1948 (age 77–78); Nigeria
- Other names: Chebechi Obioma Nwaorgu, Obioma C. Nwaorgu, Obioma Chebechi Nwaorgu
- Occupations: Parasitologist, Epidemiologist
- Years active: 1980–2023

Obioma Nwaorgu (born 1948) is a Nigerian parasitologist and epidemiologist. She is an emeritus professor of Nnamdi Azikiwe University (formerly known as Anambra State University of Technology, and then was split from Enugu State University of Science and Technology). She was educated at the University of Nigeria and University of Cambridge. Nwaorgu is remembered for her research and initiatives to eradicate the parasites associated with Guinea worm disease, malaria, river blindness, and snail fever. She was the lead researcher on twelve tropical disease research projects sponsored by the World Health Organization. Nwaorgu also was the founder and president of the NGO Global Health and Awareness Research Foundation (GHARF), which provided health education and empowerment training for women and youth. She became a fellow of the Nigerian Academy of Science in 2011, and is also a fellow of the Royal Society of Tropical Medicine and Hygiene of London.

== Early life, education and family ==
Obioma Chebechi Okolo was born in 1948 in Nigeria. She earned a Bachelor of Science in zoology from the University of Nigeria, in Nsukka, Nigeria in 1973. She continued her studies in zoology at the University of Cambridge in England. In 1976 at St Mark's Church in Cambridge, Okolo married fellow Nigerian student Joseph "Joe" Goziem Nwaorgu, who was studying estate management at the university. They went on to have four children together. Nwaorgu earned a PhD in parasitology in 1979.

== Career ==
=== Teaching (1980–2023) ===
In 1980, Nwaorgu was hired as a biologist at the newly founded Anambra State University of Technology in Enugu, She served as head of the department of biological sciences from 1981 to 1982 and of the applied biological science department until 1983. From 1983 to 1988, Nwaorgu was head of the parasitology and entomology department. Anambra State University was renamed in 1991, as the Enugu State University of Science and Technology, and in 1992 Nnamdi Azikiwe University in Awka was formed when that campus was split from Enugu State University. Nwaorgu was assigned to Nnamdi Azikiwe University at that time. She moved to Boston, Massachusetts in 1994 when she was awarded a two-year Takemi Fellowship from the Harvard School of Public Health. Nwaorgu was a World Health Organization fellow in the "Roll Back Malaria" initiative from 1999 until 2001. She returned as chair of the parasitology department in 2002 and served in that capacity until 2005. Since 2009, she has been the director of the department of energy and environment. Nwaorgu was inducted as a fellow of the Nigerian Academy of Science in 2011, and is also a fellow of the Royal Society of Tropical Medicine and Hygiene of London.

Nwaorgu has published more than 40 articles in peer-reviewed journals about public health, parasites and epidemiology. One of her works on malaria found correlations between malaria infection and the amount of rainfall and humidity. Because rainfall significantly increases the likelihood that Anopheles mosquitoes will carry the Plasmodium falciparum parasite which causes malaria, typically infection peaks one to two months after the incident of rain. Her findings were confirmed by other scientists. She initiated three control programmes in the Enugu State to reduce populations of Dracunculus medinensis (commonly called Guinea worms), Onchocerca volvulus, which cause river blindness, and Schistosoma (commonly called blood flukes), which cause snail fever. Her initiative on Guinea worms involved introducing chemicals to disinfect contaminated ponds and reduce the population of the pests and spread of disease. The decontamination project, also included free treatment for patients with Guinea worm disease. It lasted two years and reduced infections from 300,000 in 1986 to around 170,000 by 1988. Nwaorgu was the principal investigator for twelve tropical disease research projects sponsored by the World Health Organisation on the control and prevention of infectious diseases. In 2020, she was selected to lead a WHO-sponsored initiative, "Social Innovation in Health", which partnered with the Ministry of Health to improve delivery of health services. The goal was for researchers to target vulnerable populations, such as rural communities, women, and children, and address how best to address reducing communicable diseases and providing universal access to quality healthcare. The initiative led by Nwaorgu was extended in 2022 for another two-year term, after which she retired in 2023.

=== Women and children's advocacy ===
Nwaorgu founded and led the Global Health and Awareness Research Foundation (GHARF) in Enugu in 1995. The purpose of the NGO was to provide health education to women and youth, particularly those living in poverty who might otherwise have little access to education and services. On behalf of GHARF, Nwaorgu obtained numerous grants between 2000 and 2009, from partners in the US such as the Ford Foundation, and the MacArthur Foundation to conduct reproductive health and HIV/AIDS educational seminars and empowerment training workshops in Nigeria. In 2008, she was appointed to serve until 2012, on the inaugural steering committee of the African Women's Forum on Science and Technology (AWFST). The forum was an initiative created by the African Technology Policy Studies Network to promote women's involvement in policymaking, publishing, and development in science and technology. The first steering committee had representatives from the diaspora, as well as members such as Afaf Marei and Manal Samra (Egypt), RoseEmma Mamaa Entsua-Mensah and Peggy Oti-Boateng (Ghana), Norah Olembo and Agnes Wakesho Mwang'ombe (Kenya), Mamolise Falatsa and Deepa Pullanikkatil (Lesotho), Ogugua Rita Eboh (Nigeria), Bitrina Diyamett (Tanzania) and Noah Matovu (Uganda), all considered to be experts in their fields. In 2012, Mwang'ombe became the chair and Nwaorgu was selected as vice-chair of AWFST. She was honoured by the Women Aide Collective of Enugu in 2023 for her advocacy for human rights and work to empower women.

== Selected works ==
- Albertson, Donna G.; Nwaorgu, Obioma C.; Sulston, John E. (October 1979). "Chromatin Diminution and a Chromosomal Mechanism of Sexual Differentiation in Strongyloides Papillosus". Chromosoma. 75. Vienna, Austria: Springer-Verlag: 75–87. doi:10.1007/bf00330626. ISSN 0009-5915. OCLC 112576514. PMID 533664. S2CID 24522348.
- Nwaorgu, O. C. (September 1991). "The Effectiveness of Combined Control Measures on the Prevalence of Guinea Worm Disease in Anambra State, Nigeria". Journal of Helminthology. 65 (3). London, UK: London School of Hygiene and Tropical Medicine: 226–231. doi:10.1017/S0022149X00010750. ISSN 0022-149X. OCLC 116942380. S2CID 34302664.
- Nwaorgu, O. C.; Okeibunor, J.; Madu, E.; Amazigo, U.; Onyegegbu, N.; Evans, D. (October 1998). "A School-Based Schistosomiasis and Intestinal Helminthiasis Control Programme in Nigeria: Acceptability to Community Members". Tropical Medicine & International Health. 3 (10). Oxford, UK: Blackwell Science Ltd: 842–849. doi:10.1046/j.1365-3156.1998.00313.x. ISSN 1360-2276. OCLC 5153516561. PMID 9809919.
- Aribodor, Dennis N.; Nwaorgu, Obioma C.; Eneanya, Christine I.; Okoli, Ikechukwu; Pukkila-Worley, Reed; Etaga, Harrison O. (September 2009). "Association of Low Birth Weight and Placental Malarial Infection in Nigeria". Journal of Infection in Developing Countries. 3 (8). Sassari, Italy: Open Learning on Enteric Pathogens, University of Sassari: 264–281. doi:10.3855/jidc.554. ISSN 1972-2680. OCLC 449974346. PMID 19801805.
- Nwaorgu, O. C.; Orajaka, B. N. (October 2011). "Prevalence of Malaria among Children 1–10 Years Old in Communities in Awka North Local Government Area, Anambra State South East Nigeria". African Research Review. 5 (22). Dire Dawa, Ethiopia: International Association of African Researchers and Reviewers: 264–281. doi:10.4314/afrrev.v5i5.21. ISSN 1994-9057. OCLC 4807749411.
- Okeibunor, Joseph; Njepuome, A. Ngozi; Nwaorgu, Obioma C.; Onyeneho, Nkechi G.; Amazigo, Uche V. (2015). "6. Community Perception of Health Services in South East Nigeria: A Reflection of Health System Governance in Nigeria". In Reich, Michael R.; Takemi, Keizō (eds.). Governing Health Systems: For Nations and Communities Around the World (PDF) (1st ed.). Brookline, Massachusetts: Lamprey & Lee. pp. 138–176. ISBN 978-1-942108-00-9. Archived (PDF) from the original on 29 February 2024.
