= Norah Olembo =

Kenyan biochemist and policy advocate (1941–2021)

- Olembo in 2001
- Born: Norah Khadzini Ngaira; 10 June 1941; Kaimosi, British Kenya
- Died: 11 March 2021 (aged 79); Nairobi, Kenya
- Occupations: Academic and science policy developer and lobbyist

Professor Norah Khadzini Olembo (10 June 1941 – 11 March 2021) was a Kenyan biochemist and policy developer, who helped establish standards for use of biotechnology in Kenya. She was the first African to become a professor and chair of the biochemistry department at the University of Nairobi. Raised in Western Kenya during British rule, Olembo studied biology at Butere Girls High School before completing her A-level studies at The Mount School in York, England. She earned a bachelor's, master's, and PhD in botany, chemistry, and zoology at the University of Nairobi before taking post-graduate courses in biochemistry and molecular biology at the University of London. While teaching at the University of Nairobi, she founded the Biotechnology Trust Africa in 1992. The organisation funded research into development of disease-free crops and vaccines for animal diseases.

From 1992 until 2004, Olembo was the head of Kenya Industrial Property Office which was responsible for monitoring and recommending policies on environmental management, including regulating trade and intellectual property rights in regard to biodiversity. Her work helped build the position for Kenya's walkout of the WTO talks in Cancun, Mexico in 2003. At a time when most African nations shunned biotechnology, Olembo recognised its potential for national development. She was the inaugural chair of the African Technology Policy Studies Network from its independence in 2001 from the International Development Research Centre. Her lobbying efforts for policies led to the successful passage of the "Environmental Management and Coordination Act" of 1999 and the "National Guidelines for Research and Development of HIV/AIDS Vaccines", which both set out policies to foster collaboration, with protections for fair compensation and benefits from research. She was instrumental in the creation and adoption of the 2006 "National Biotechnology Development Policy" and the 2009 "Biosafety Act". In addition to her policy work, Olembo served on the planning committees for Kenyan participation in the 1985 and 1995 World Conferences on Women. She was a founder of FEMNET and the African Women's Forum on Science and Technology, organisations created to foster women's leadership and empowerment. Olembo was inducted into the Kenya National Academy of Sciences in 1994. She was honoured with the Order of the Grand Warrior of Kenya in 1995 and as a Moran of the Order of the Burning Spear in 2001.

== Early life, education, and family ==
Norah Khadzini Ngaira was born on 10 June 1941, at the Friends Mission Hospital in Kaimosi in British Kenya to Berita Khasoha and Benjamin Shitsugane Ngaira. Her mother, who completed her school education at Standard 8 of primary school, raised the couple's eight daughters and three sons. Her father was a teacher and Quaker missionary of the East African Church of Friends and the family lived on the Kaimosi Missionary Station. Ngaira attended Kaimosi Friends Primary School and became head girl. She wanted to attend the African Girls' High School, the top girls' school in Kenya at the time, but instead was admitted in 1960 to the new Butere Girls High School. She took O-level courses in biology, as other subjects were not available. She said that at the time, she had "never heard of chemistry and physics" because the only STEM courses taught to girls were math and biology. After passing her O-level examination, the Friends Church in Kaimosi gave Ngaira a scholarship to attend The Mount School in York, England, between 1962 and 1964. At The Mount, she studied biology, chemistry, English, and physics and became captain of the girls' hockey team. After passing her A-level examination, Ngaira was accepted at University College, Nairobi (now the University of Nairobi) to study botany, chemistry, and zoology.

Olembo analyses protein bands with a densitometer to find out what factors in the insect blood in the gut and salivary glands control the development of the sleeping sickness parasite.

During her studies, Ngaira met Reuben Olembo, a guest lecturer from Makerere College in Kampala, Uganda, who was originally from the Vihiga District in Kenya. They began dating, and married in 1968. In the meantime, they wrote letters, while she continued her studies. She earned a bachelor of science and began her master's degree work in zoology under her mentor Thomas Risley Odhiambo, a Kenyan entomologist. After her marriage Olembo had twins, Kenneth and Caroline, and later two more daughters, Lynnette and Lilian. Her master's studies, completed in 1972, focused on tsetse fly digestion, a theme which carried over into her PhD thesis. Upon completing her PhD, Olembo earned a post-doctoral degree in biochemistry and another in molecular biology from the University of London. During her studies, she became interested in crop production technology, specifically on how local villagers could modify the climatic condition by using greenhouses to extend production seasons. She taught local women to use technology to produce high-value crops such as bananas and vegetables.

== Career ==
=== Academic career ===
Olembo was hired as an associate professor at the University of Nairobi, one of only three women in the biochemistry department. Working her way through the ranks, she became the first African biochemistry professor at the university and was made chair of the department. in 1989. Her research focused on biotechnology and she studied the role of biodiversity, insects, disease and environmental protection in food security. She was the founder of the Biotechnology Trust Africa, an organisation created in 1992 with the assistance of the Netherlands Ministry for Development Co-operation. Its goal was to promote sustainable environmental practices through improved agricultural and health initiatives. From 1993, consultations with farmers and scientists revealed issues farmers wished to pursue, prioritising those best suited to solutions resulting from the use of biotechnologies. Nine proposals were funded by the Biotechnology Trust Africa. Farmers established trial farms, using indigenous knowledge and practices, and scientists provided starter crops along with consultations and evaluations. The trials produced disease-free bananas, citrus fruits, cassava, and sweet potatoes. In addition they led to the creation of a vaccine for Newcastle disease in poultry. Olembo returned to teaching full-time in 2003, after a ten-year break working for the Kenya Industrial Property Institution.

=== Women's advocate ===
Olembo, Eddah Gachukia, and Njoki Wainaina were appointed to the Kenya NGO Organising Committee in 1984 to plan the Forum activities for the 1985 World Conference on Women to be held in Nairobi. After attending an initial planning meeting in Arusha, Tanzania, with officials from the United Nations they were tasked with organising African women to attend the conference. They created a constitution, and registered FEMNET, to allow African women to network and work for their own empowerment. Gachukia was the first chair of the organisation and Olembo served as inaugural secretary. During her tenure until 1992, she acted as rapporteur for the organisational conferences and wrote the reports for the conferences held in Arusha (1984), Nairobi (1985), the First Programming Conference (1992), and Dakar (1994). The Programming Conference and Dakar meeting were held to plan the participation for the 1995 World Conference on Women to be held in Beijing, China.

=== Policy developer, lobbyist ===
In 1992, Olembo was appointed by the Ministry of Trade and Industry to create the Kenya Industrial Property Office, which she directed until 2002. It was reorganised as the Kenya Industrial Property Institution in 2003 and she led it through the inaugural year. Her duties at the organisation were to monitor and assist in the development of a comprehensive national policy on environmental management, which included regulating trade and intellectual property rights in connection with biodiversity. Her work helped build the position for Kenya's walkout of the World Trade Organisation's talks in Cancun, Mexico in 2003.

While most Southern African countries were against the use of biotechnology because of its tendency to favour the developer of the technology over the rights of farmers and indigenous knowledge, both Kenya and South Africa favoured its use. Olembo was in favour of using biotechnology to gain self-sufficiency in food production, and to prevent environmental damage caused by traditional farming methods. She also pointed out that biotechnologies were not limited to GMO crops, but had applications for improving health and industry. When Kenya decided to use biotechnologies, safety regulations and policies needed to be drafted, and Olembo contacted colleagues in the Netherlands to assist with funding the research committee. She chaired the Kenya-Netherlands Biotechnology Platform, which worked with the National Council for Science and Technology, the Kenyan Agricultural Research Institute (KARI), and the World Bank, consulting with farmers, industries, and scientists for a full year before beginning a review of policy documents from various organisations and governments that had established regulations.

Beginning in 1986, chemical companies in the United States had begun patenting seeds which had been genetically engineered. The problem for the Global South then became that plant materials defined under the International Convention for the Protection of New Varieties of Plants were considered as common heritage. According to Olembo, this meant that plants which were acquired free of charge from developing countries by developed countries were being modified and then protected by patents and being sold back to their country of origin at a cost. Ethical debates on gene patenting were not limited to crops, as for example, when British scientists Thomas Hanke and Andrew McMichael applied for a patent on an AIDS vaccine, they omitted as co-inventors the Kenyan team, who collaborated with them, Omu Anzala and Jeckoniah Ndinya-Achola, led by Job Bwayo. Because the Kenyan team were not notified that a patent would be filed, the British team agreed to modify the application. In the dispute that followed, the British scientists agreed to list the Kenyans as co-patent owners, but refused to list them as joint inventors. Olembo pointed out that it was the Kenyans who discovered a group of sex workers whose immune systems prevented them from contracting HIV even though they were exposed to the virus. The British scientists claimed that because the Kenyan scientists had published their study, the information they relied upon to create the vaccine was public knowledge. To govern access- and benefit – sharing to non-human genetic resources, in 1999 the "Environmental Management and Coordination Act" was passed. The act did not include access to or protocols for human genetic material, as Kenya had taken the position, according to Olembo, that "patenting of human genes is unethical" and that breakthroughs in human genome research were not inventions. The country also adopted the "National Guidelines for Research and Development of HIV/AIDS Vaccines" to ensure that agencies, NGOs, scientists, and others engaged in research and development collaborate to accelerate processes, but also established policy for fair compensation and benefits from the research, as well as proper notification of collaborators if the research were to be developed for commercial adaptations. Olembo was inducted into the Kenya National Academy of Sciences in 1994, and was honoured with the Order of the Grand Warrior of Kenya in 1995, and as a Moran of the Order of the Burning Spear in 2001.

Prof. Norah Olembo was a founding member of the African Biotechnology Stakeholders Forum, a group which formed in 2000 to coordinate public awareness of biotechnology developments and safety issues. She also chaired the African Technology Policy Studies Network (ATPS) from its establishment in 2001 as an autonomous institution, outside the umbrella of the International Development Research Centre headquartered in Ottawa, Canada, until 2007. According to Olembo, the purpose of the institution was to create the policies which would enable science and technology, research and development, and scientific education and training to thrive throughout Africa. During her tenure, a major hurdle to achieving their goals was the low government and donor support in sub-Saharan Africa for investment in science and technology. The four most critical areas for policy development targeted by ATPS at the time, were climate change, along with the relevant environmental and energy policies; water, including both shortages and conflicts over shared resources; health systems; and global trade. Many of their lobbying activities focused on educating parliamentarians about how science and technology could be used in development. Other activities included building national research networks and holding workshops.

Prof. Olembo served on the executive committee of the International Development Research Centre in 2001, was reappointed in December 2002, and continued as an executive member until 2005. The centre worked in partnership with the Canadian International Development Agency, which financed a research laboratory at the International Livestock Research Institute in Nairobi, for scientists from Burundi, Democratic Republic of Congo, Djibouti, Eritrea, Ethiopia, Kenya, Madagascar, Rwanda, Somalia, Sudan, Tanzania and Uganda, to collaborate on developing plants that were disease-resistant and on creating vaccines for livestock diseases, which opened in 2004. In 2003, Olembo was part of a study panel, including head of English Nature Brian Johnson (chair, UK), Virender Lal Chopra (India), Anne Kapuscinski (US), and Gabrielle Persley (Australia) to study biosafety within the Consultative Group for International Agricultural Research (CGIAR) framework and make recommendations on policies and best practices which could be implemented to improve the safety design. The report, delivered in 2006, stated that each centre that was part of the CGIAR system had biosafety policies in place. Although the panel made twelve recommendations for improving policies, the primary three recommendations to strengthen the policies included considering biosafety issues in the research rather than in the development phase, undertaking biosafety-related research, and collaboration with national research and regulatory bodies.

Prof. Norah Olembo became the executive director of the African Biotechnology Stakeholders Forum around 2005, after the death of its former leader, John S. Wafula. She continued to press for science policies and led the efforts to prevent the disposal of radioactive waste in Kenya. Her advocacy also led to the adoption of the 2006 National Biotechnology Development Policy and 2009 Biosafety Act. She unsuccessfully ran for a seat in the Parliament of Kenya as a candidate of the National Labour Party for the Emuhaya Constituency in 2007. In 2008, Olembo was appointed to serve through 2012, as co-chair with Agnes Wakesho Mwang'ombe of the African Women's Forum on Science and Technology (AWFST). The forum was an initiative created by the ATPS in 2008 to promote women's involvement in policymaking, publishing, and development in science and technology. The inaugural steering committee had representatives from the diaspora, as well as members such as Afaf Marei and Manal Samra (Egypt), RoseEmma Mamaa Entsua-Mensah and Peggy Oti-Boateng (Ghana), Lucy Muchoki (Kenya), Mamolise Falatsa and Deepa Pullanikkatil (Lesotho), Ogugua Rita Eboh and Obioma Nwaorgu (Nigeria), Bitrina Diyamett (Tanzania) and Noah Matovu (Uganda), who were considered to be experts in their fields.

== Death and legacy ==
Prof. Norah Khadzini Olembo died on 11 March 2021, after a 10-month battle with cancer of the mouth, and was buried in Bunyore. At the time of her death, she was remembered as one of Kenya's most noted scientists, having published over 30 papers. She nurtured generations of students and simultaneously took on leadership roles in developing scientific policies that would shape the standards of both the University of Nairobi and the government. At a time when most African countries were rejecting the use of biotechnology, Olembo embraced technologies that could assist in the development of the country by reducing poverty, increasing food production, reducing disease, and limiting environmental damage. She successfully pressed for the creation of policies to enshrine biosafety protocols, to protect intellectual property rights, to enable the adoption of innovative science and technology discoveries and to promote scientific education, research, and development. She is remembered both locally and internationally for her work on protecting intellectual patent rights, as during her tenure the Kenya Industrial Property Institution was the largest patent centre in Africa. She was one of the women featured in Susan Wakhungu-Githuku's 2010 book Life Journeys: Seeking Destiny, which told the stories of successful contemporary Kenyan women.

== Selected works ==
- Hoek, Jan B.; Pearson, David J.; Olembo, Norah K. (November 1976). "Nicotinamide-Adenine Dinucleotide-Linked "Malic" Enzyme in Flight Muscle of the Tse-Tse Fly (Glossina) and Other Insects". Biochemical Journal. 160 (2). London: Portland Press: 253–262. doi:10.1042/bj1600253. ISSN 0264-6021. OCLC 112778570. PMC 1164231. PMID 12751.
- Olembo, Norah K.; Pearson, David J. (December 1982). "Changes in the Contents of Intermediates of Proline and Carbohydrate Metabolism in Flight Muscle of the Tsetse Fly Glossina Morsit Ans and the Fleshfly Sarcophaga Tibialis". Insect Biochemistry. 12 (6). New York, New York: Elsevier: 657–662. doi:10.1016/0020-1790(82)90053-1. ISSN 0020-1790. OCLC 4924346512.
- Konji, Victor N.; Olembo, Norah K.; Pearson, David J. (December 1984). "Enzyme Activities in the Fat Body of the Tsetse Fly Glossina Morsitans and the Fleshfly Sarcophaga Tibialis in Relation to Proline Metabolism". Insect Biochemistry. 14 (6). New York, New York: Elsevier: 685–690. doi:10.1016/0020-1790(84)90047-7. ISSN 0020-1790. OCLC 4924338202.
- Konji, Victor N.; Olembo, Norah K.; Pearson, David J. (December 1988). "Proline Synthesis in the Fat Body of the Tsetse Fly Glossina Morsitans, and Its Stimulation by Isocitrate". Insect Biochemistry. 18 (5). New York, New York: Elsevier: 449–452. doi:10.1016/0020-1790(88)90061-3. ISSN 0020-1790. OCLC 4924341058.
- Njagi, Eluid N.M.; Olembo, Norah K.; Pearson, David J. (July 1992). "Proline Transport by Tsetse Fly Glossina Morsitans Flight Muscle Mitochondria". Comparative Biochemistry and Physiology B. 102 (3). New York, New York: Elsevier: 579–584. doi:10.1016/0305-0491(92)90050-2. ISSN 0305-0491. OCLC 120912580. PMID 1499295.
- Olembo, Norah K.; Nguu, Edward K.; Ochanda, J. O.; Ochieng, Vincent Onyango (November 1994). "Inhibition of Bloodmeal Digestion in Glossina Morsitans Fed on Rabbits Immunized With Tsetse Midgut Homogenate". East African Medical Journal. 71 (10). Nairobi, Kenya: Medical Associations of East Africa: 651–655. doi:10.1016/0305-0491(92)90050-2. ISSN 0012-835X. OCLC 198919031. PMID 7821245.
- Ngaira, Jane; Olembo, Norah K.; Njagi, Eluid N.M.; Ngeranwa, Joseph J. N. (May 2005). "The Detection of Non-Rotat 1.2 Trypanosoma Evansi". Experimental Parasitology. 110 (1). San Diego, California: Elsevier: 30–38. doi:10.1016/j.exppara.2005.01.001. ISSN 0014-4894. OCLC 111509425. PMID 15804376.
- Olembo, Norah (2005). "6. Intellectual Property Rights Policy". In Omamo, Steven Were; von Grebmer, Klaus (eds.). Biotechnology, Agriculture, and Food Security in Southern Africa. Washington, D. C.: International Food Policy Research Institute. pp. 173–186. ISBN 978-0-89629-737-1.
