= Honorary male =

Woman who is accorded the status of a man without disrupting the patriarchal status quo

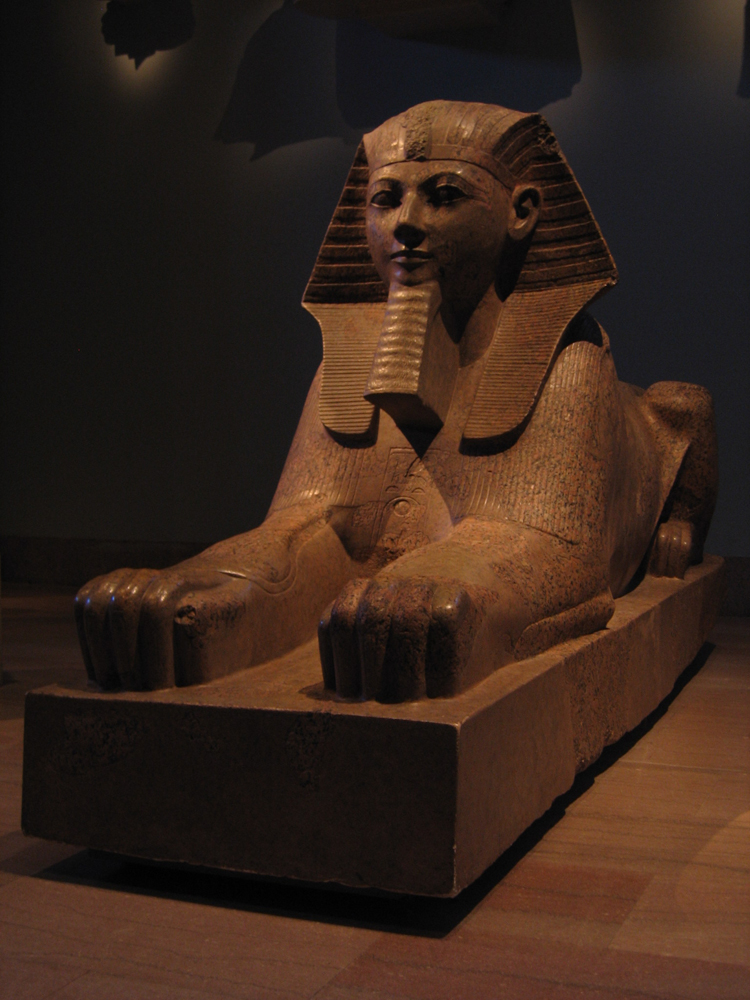
Queen Hatshepsut of Egypt ruled as full pharaoh 1479–58 BC.

An honorary male or honorary man is a concept from feminist theory, according to which a woman is accorded the status of a man without disrupting the patriarchal status quo. Such women can take on roles typically associated with men (such as being a monarch), but they may not substantially alter gender norms for the rest of their society. Examples include Queen Hatshepsut (ancient Egypt), Queen Elizabeth I (16th century England), and Margaret Thatcher (20th century Britain).

== History ==
=== Ancient Egypt ===
Queen Hatshepsut was the first female ruler of ancient Egypt after Sobekneferu to act as a full pharaoh. Ruling in the New Kingdom, Hatshepsut depicted and asserted herself as a male ruler. In artwork and sculpture of Hatshepsut, she is represented in the traditional pharaoh headdress, kilt, and false beard—a symbol of kingship; her breasts are reduced and deemphasized, and her shoulders are broad and manly. Hatshepsut executed several building projects and military campaigns and brought Egypt into a period of peace and prosperity. Hatshepsut's actions to improve the status of women during this time are unknown, although women in ancient Egypt could decide their own professions, marry whomever they desired, contract prenuptial agreements that favored them, divorce their husbands, own real estate, enter the clergy, and had access to birth control and abortions. Women in Egypt during this time held higher status than their counterparts in other countries, and more than Egyptian women would be in later centuries after the rise of Christianity in the 4th century AD and later Islam in the 7th century AD.

=== Iron Age ===
Female burials in the La Tène culture in Western Europe between 450 BC and 380 BC indicate the elite status of some women. Indicators of elite status in Central and Southern Germany in this period included objects of power similar to those found in preceding periods. High status graves in the preceding Hallstatt period (750 BC to 450 BC) included gold neck rings, bronze daggers, bronze drinking vessels, and four-wheeled wagons. Grave sites in the Hochdorf, Biberach region, excavated in 1970, found only elite male burial objects before and during the Hallstatt Period. However, in 480 BC, the number of elite male graves began dropping and were suddenly replaced by elite female graves. Around the same time these high status burials transitioned from majority men to women. War brought forth massive emigration of males, leaving behind women to fill the roles typically held by men.

Similar shifts in population occurred in the Celtic regions of Europe. As most of Celtic society in the Iron Age centered around agriculture, the landowning class dominated. The ruling class also made up the military elite. As Warfare in Medieval Scotland increased, women soon found themselves in roles of land ownership and power. Competitive feasting, large events held by the now landowning women, involved large quantities of alcohol and food. The quality of the feast represented the host's socio-economic status. Equipment, dress, and methods for performing these feasts also influenced laws and values. Gold neck rings, symbolizing the highest status of a successful feast host have been found in female graves indicating that women continued the practices traditionally upheld by men. Women assuming positions of power in this patriarchal society was made possible by a lower population of men, not an absence. According to Bettina Arnold, author of "‘Honorary males’ or women of substance? Gender, status, and power in Iron-Age Europe", archaeological analysis of burial shows some women were honorary males as they were buried with both socio-economic as well as military symbols of power.

=== Prior to 1900s ===
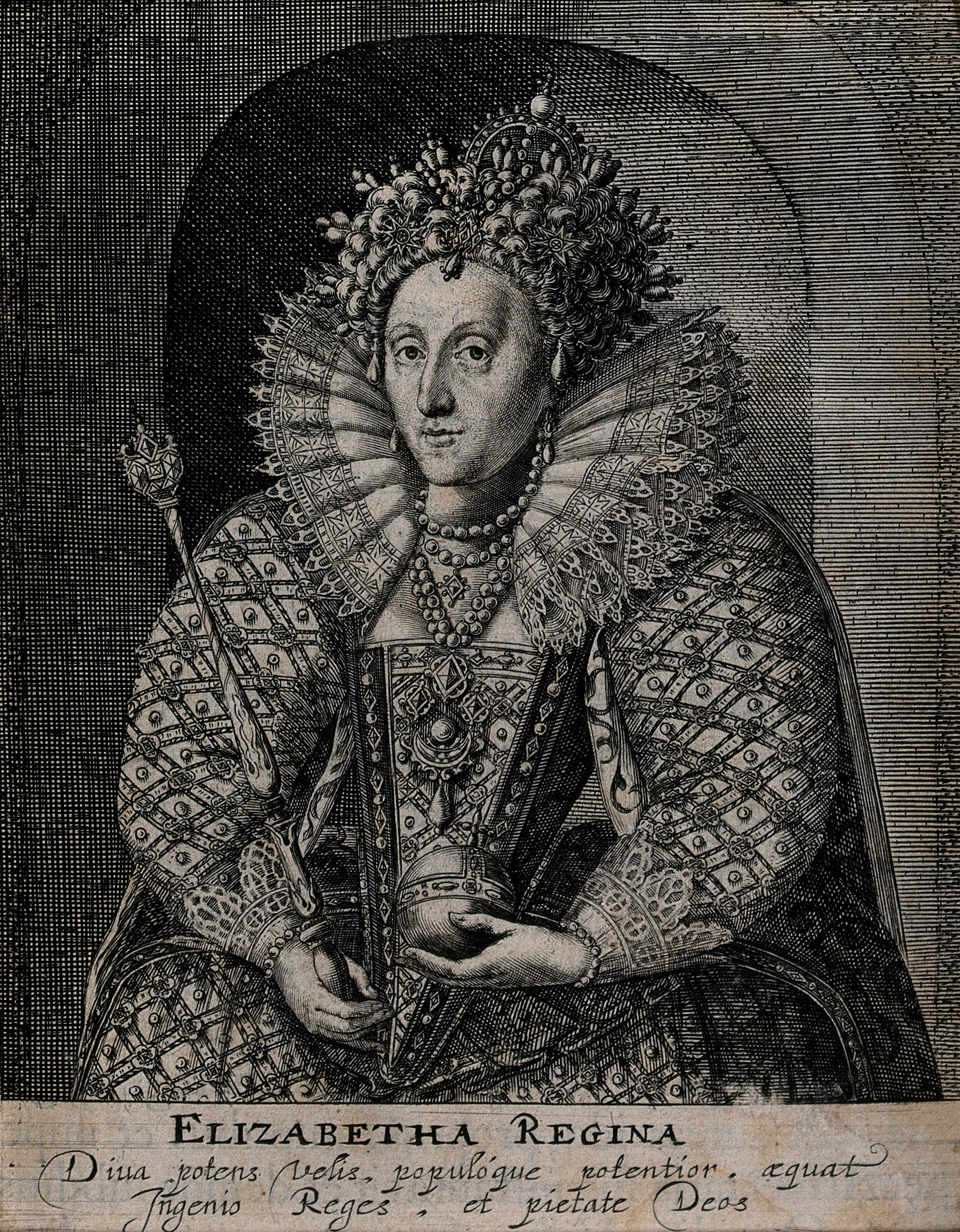
Queen Elizabeth I, whose prestige arguably did not further the standing of women in her country

In "Queen Elizabeth I and the Persistence of Patriarchy", Allison Heisch describes honorary males as women who accept the values and practices of the male society in which they function, and internalize and follow them. She notes that honorary males tend to support rather than subvert patriarchal governance, and cites as an example Queen Elizabeth I, whose reign had little to no impact on the status of women in England. She also cites the example of Gertrude Stein sitting in her salon, smoking cigars and conversing with the men. Stein's participation temporarily modifies the after-dinner ritual in which men smoke cigars and talk amongst themselves, but does not permanently alter it. An exception is made for her because she is seen as different from other women; Ernest Hemingway once wrote in a letter, "Gertrude Stein and me are just like brothers".

=== 1900s to present ===
The honorary man, Carolyn Heilbrun writes in the 1988 "Non-Autobiographies of 'Privileged' Women: England and America", must isolate herself from the common run of women to maintain her "privileged" status. In this way, she exchanges one form of confinement (the domestic sphere) for another (the male realm).

Comparing male domination of the political sphere in Zambia to that in the United States in 1998, Sara Hlupekile Longwe writes that honorary males are often also queen bees who have been "schooled to believe that women already have equality—because they themselves have reached the top"; she calls this the Thatcher syndrome. Such women, she claims, do not wish to empower other women, but rather to preserve their own exceptional status among the men.

Margaret Atwood described the results of a study of book reviews conducted in 1972:

We also found that, if a man's book was being praised, it tended to attract excess-of-malehood adjectives; the writer was an ultra-man. If dispraised, the poor guy would be allotted adjectives from the Quiller-Couch "female" slate. If female and unsatisfactory, a woman writer would be more female than female; if admired, she would "transcend her sex" (that's a quote) and would be raised to the status of non-woman, or honorary man. "She thinks like a man" was a compliment.

Ursula K. Le Guin once said in an interview, "I read the Norton Anthology of Literature by Women from cover to cover. It was a bible for me. It taught me that I didn't have to write like an honorary man anymore, that I could write like a woman and feel liberated in doing so."

This phenomenon can be seen in academia. Barbara Bagihole, the Director of Studies for MA in Women's Studies at the University of Loughborough, England, conducted a study that revealed that the women she interviewed felt the need to disassociate themselves from their female colleagues in order to succeed in their male dominated field.

Women in the military face a similar problem. Recent wars in Iraq and Afghanistan have allowed American women combat roles. However, in order for women in the military to be accepted and considered successful, they feel they must become "one of the guys". Otherwise, they would face sexual and gender based ridicule that, in some cases, led to women ending their military careers. Feminist theorist Cynthia Enloe argues that the institution of the military is not comparable to those of education or business because of its inherently violent and hypermasculine characteristics. She states that this environment is so harmful for women that they can never fully assimilate.

== The double bind ==
The double bind is essentially the double standard held against women candidates and political leaders. A woman's ability to overcome the double bind enables her to obtain the status of an honorary man. To overcome the double bind women candidates and political leaders must enhance their masculine qualities and reduce their feminine qualities to be perceived as capable for the job. Women must not appear too masculine to the point where they seem "strong" nor too feminine to the point where they seem "weak". Dolan, Deckman, and Swers discuss in their book Women and Politics that a woman candidate must successfully overcome the double bind to participate in the masculine political realm.

In the 2008 United States presidential election, Hillary Clinton and Sarah Palin faced unique double binds in their races to presidential and vice-presidential office, respectively. Both candidates had to successfully balance their feminine and masculine images as well as other challenges of public opinion. Clinton was able to overcome the double bind through portraying herself as tough and experienced (masculine) and compassionate and likable (feminine). The Clinton campaign emphasized her involvement in Washington, D.C. and her knowledge on the issues. Her campaign also tried to portray her as a sincere person who cared about the American people. However, Clinton failed to reach the public as a trustworthy individual who can connect and relate to the average person.

Palin also skillfully navigated the double bind, showing herself as a tough political outsider and a family woman. Palin criticized Obama and reiterated her image as a regular hockey mom, not a career politician. Palin's emphasis on her position as a political outsider helped her gain the trust of the people and convinced them that she could be a possible agent of political change—a belief Clinton could not seem to convey to many of her opponents. However, Palin's position as a political outsider backfired on her and revealed her actual lack of qualifications for the office.

=== Working around the double bind ===
As the double bind associated with honorary males is more related to gender than it is to sex, certain cultures have chosen to avoid the double bind by expressing their gender differently. For example, some women in Albania live their lives as men in order to gain access to the privileges men inherit. In other words, this culture involves individuals who were assigned female at birth performing as the masculine gender for their own benefit. Aline Smithson composed an article featuring anthropologists and photographers who have interacted face to face with the "Sworn Virgins". In her article, she writes, “Sworn Virgin” is the term given to a biological female in the Balkans who has chosen to take on the social identity of a man for life. As a tradition dating back hundreds of years, this was sometimes necessary in a society that lived within tribal clans, followed the Kanun, an archaic code of law, and maintained an oppressive rule over the female gender. Young girls were commonly forced into arranged marriages with much older men in distant villages."

With this lifestyle, individuals who were assigned female at birth have much easier access to freedoms naturally granted to men. The freedom to drive, vote, control money, and own property, all functions traditionally allowed for men only, can be accessed through this choice. Honorary males in this society are guaranteed stability as well. As Albania is a patriarchal society, the families who suddenly lost a male figure "would find themselves in jeopardy of losing everything."

== Literature involving honorary males ==
In André Brinks, The Novel, Language and Narrative from Cervantes to Calvino, it is stated that a character's ability to speak is determined by each character's relation to power. From his Chapter, La Princesse de Cleves, "The only women who do speak their minds at times are those in positions of power, (The Queen, The Queen Mother..), because in these positions they function as honorary males." (Brink, 59) Proximity to power occurs in other forms of literature involving other honorary males.

=== Honorary males in detective fiction ===
Kathleen Gregory Klein's 1988 The Woman Detective: Gender and Genre investigates the difficulties of creating a woman character while keeping true to the genre of the standard male detective theme. Klein is mentioned on this very issue in Glenwood Irons Feminism in Women's Detective Fiction, stating, "Certainly a woman’s script did not include setting up professionally in a job which so clearly required acknowledged masculine virtues like physical strength, logical thinking, and worldly experience. Women might be successful amateur detectives so long as they employed the more stereotypically feminine talents of gossip and intuition, but they were barred from detective careers." Many female detective fiction authors choose to include, even center, stories around gendered issues like status and traditionally feminine behaviour.

The Amelia Butterworth Mysteries by Anna Katharine Green is a detective fiction based on Amelia Buttersworth, a wealthy, single woman with limited family who has the free time to solve mysteries. This character has been referred to as an Honorary Male in Feminism in Women's Detective Fiction by Glenwood Irons, "They work seamlessly in a male world, occasionally adding the frisson of a woman in peril. These characters are anomalies...These two women detectives are clearly honorary males." (Irons, pg. 3)

== See also ==
- Albanian sworn virgins
- Androcentrism
- Bacha posh (Afghanistan)
- Gender policing
- Hegemonic masculinity
- Honorary Aryan
- Honorary white
- Joan of Arc
- Male privilege
- Third gender
