= Olembo (surname) =

Olembo is a surname, and may refer to:

- Reuben Olembo (1937–2005), Kenyan academic, scientist, and environmentalist
- Norah Olembo (1941–2021), Kenyan biochemist and policy developer
