= Nippon Club =

Nippon Club may refer to:

- Nippon Club (New York), founded in 1905 in the United States.
- Nippon Club (Johannesburg), founded in 1961.
