= RoseEmma Mamaa Entsua-Mensah =

Ghanaian fisteries scientist and aquatic ecologist

- Born: RoseEmma Mamaa Croffie; 24 September 1959 (age 67); Tamale, Dominion of Ghana
- Other names: M. Entsua-Mensah, Mamaa Entsua-Mensah, R. E. M. Entsua-Mensah
- Education: University of Cape Coast; University of Ghana
- Children: 3
- Scientific career
- Fields: Fisheries science, freshwater aquatic ecology
- Workplaces: University of Education, Winneba; Council for Scientific and Industrial Research – Ghana

RoseEmma Mamaa Entsua-Mensah (née Croffie; born 24 September 1959) is a Ghanaian fisheries scientist and freshwater aquatic ecologist. She was the chief research scientist and deputy director general of the country's Council for Scientific and Industrial Research (CSIR) from 2008 to 2019. She then became the director of the Centre for Innovation and Entrepreneurship at the CSIR College of Science and Technology. She holds a Bachelor of Science in zoology and a Master of Science in marine biology from the University of Cape Coast, as well as a PhD in fisheries science from the University of Ghana and a post-graduate certificate in aquatic resource management from the University of Hull. Her work has focused on documenting fish species in freshwater ecosystems and evaluating environmental impacts on their environments. She has also written about the roles of women in science education and research. She is a fellow of the Ghana Academy of Arts and Sciences.

== Early life, education, and family ==
RoseEmma Mamaa Croffie was born on 24 September 1959 in Tamale, Dominion of Ghana, to Emma Norma and Solomon Richmond Richard Croffie. Both her parents were educationists and the family included a brother and a sister. Croffie attended Wesley Girls' Senior High School in Cape Coast, completing her O-levels in 1977 and her A-levels in 1979. She was a recipient of The Duke of Edinburgh's Gold Award (known as the Head of State Scheme in Ghana) in 1978. She earned a Bachelor of Science in zoology, a diploma of education, and then a Master of Science in marine biology from the University of Cape Coast. Croffie married Clement Entsua-Mensah, a librarian at the University of Cape Coast, with whom she had three children: Nanakua, Maame Adwoa, and Kobby. In 1994, Entusua-Mensah was awarded a Tonolli Memorial Fellowship from the International Society of Limnology to assist with her PhD studies. She completed her PhD in fisheries science at the University of Ghana, in 1998 with a thesis titled, Comparative Studies of the Dynamics and Management of Fish Populations in an Open and Closed Lagoon in Ghana. She later earned a certificate in aquatic resource management at the University of Hull, in Kingston upon Hull, England, and a post-graduate certificate from the Ghana Institute of Management and Public Administration in business administration. In 2001, she was admitted as a member of the International Society of Limnology.

== Career ==
=== Teaching (2001–2009) ===
Entusua-Mensah started her career teaching in 2001 at the University of Education in Winneba. Simultaneously, she conducted research for the Water Research Institute of the Council for Scientific and Industrial Research (CSIR). Between 2004 and 2005, she worked on the Millennium Ecosystem Assessment, an international, multi-disciplinary project designed to create a baseline for global ecosystems and a framework to evaluate how such systems could be better managed for the well-being of people and environments. After completing work on the project, she taught as a visiting scholar at the University of Tennessee, in Knoxville, before returning to Ghana in 2006 to teach at the University of Cape Coast until 2009.

=== Research scientist and administrator (2008–2019) ===
In 2008, Entusua-Mensah was appointed chief research scientist and deputy director general of the CSIR. Her appointment marked the first time that a woman was appointed as deputy director general. Entusua-Mensah's primary focus was on researching freshwater ecosystems and lagoons throughout Ghana and West Africa. She documented various fish species and their management systems and conducted research on coastal ecology and waterfalls in Ghana. She warned of the damages caused to the environment by illegal mining, salt winning, and improper sewage disposal, noting in particular that the destruction of mangroves impacted fish and wildlife as well as human development. She wrote and collaborated in over a hundred research publications. Entusua-Mensah was honoured for her work in fish farming by the South African NGO, Creating Excellence, in 2013 as Africa's Most Influential Woman in Agricultural Research and was inducted as a fellow of the Ghana Academy of Arts and Sciences in 2015.

Entusua-Mensah also conducted gender studies which evaluated the roles of women involved in science education and policy and women who worked in sanitation and water management. In 2008, she was appointed to serve until 2012 on the inaugural steering committee of the African Women's Forum on Science and Technology (AWFST). The forum was an initiative created by the African Technology Policy Studies Network to promote women's involvement in policymaking, publishing, and development in science and technology. The first steering committee had representatives from the diaspora, as well as members such as Afaf Marei and Manal Samra (Egypt), Peggy Oti-Boateng (Ghana), Norah Olembo and Agnes Wakesho Mwang'ombe (Kenya), Mamolise Falatsa and Deepa Pullanikkatil (Lesotho), Ogugua Rita Eboh and Obioma Nwaorgu (Nigeria), Bitrina Diyamett (Tanzania) and Noah Matovu (Uganda), who were considered to be experts in their fields. The Ghanaian Ministry of Women and Children's Affairs recognised her work with the Excellence Award for Scientific Research in 2012. To further the development of women scientists, Entusua-Mensah pressed for policies that would overcome systemic biases against women in science and research. With other senior women scientists at the CSIR, a mentorship directory was developed in 2016 to encourage women to pursue careers in science, technology, engineering, and mathematics (STEM) fields, to give women networking opportunities with other scientists, and to facilitate the recruitment of talent.

Entusua-Mensah's administrative responsibilities included assisting the director general in establishing research priorities of the CSIR. She was directly responsible for monitoring and evaluating research results to maintain government standards of quality, overseeing agricultural research and coordination between researchers and farming extension services throughout the country. Among the projects she coordinated were the West African Agricultural Productivity Programme I (2008–2013), the agricultural research grants programmes for the National Agricultural Research System (2008–2017), the Food and Budgetary Support research (2010–2012) with partners from the World Bank and the Canadian International Development Agency, and the West African Agricultural Productivity Programme II (2013–2017). She also coordinated agricultural modernisation programmes funded by the Canadian International Development Agency, the Korea-Africa Food & Agriculture Cooperation Initiative, and the Korea Programme for International Cooperation in Agricultural Technology. She retired from the CSIR administration 2018, and from the CSIR in September 2019.

=== College of Science and Technology (2019–present) ===
Along with other academics, Entusua-Mensah was one of the leaders in pressing the CSIR to found the College of Science and Technology (CCST), with the goals of teaching natural resource management and climate science to create sustainable growth and address the impact of environmental change and implementation of new technologies. Created in 2017, the CCST offers courses on instruction in agriculture, clean air and water, entrepreneurship, health and medicine, natural resource conservation, sanitation management, sustainable energy, and transportation. The college was affiliated with the University of Cape Coast and graduated its first class in 2020. Upon leaving the CSIR, Entusua-Mensah became the director of the Centre for Innovation and Entrepreneurship at CCST and in 2022 was appointed as one of the 13 members of the governing board of the CCST.

== Selected works ==
- Entsua-Mensah, M. (January 1995). "Length-Weight Relationships of Fishes From Tributaries of the Volta River, Ghana Part 1: Analysis of Pooled Data" (PDF). Naga: The ICLARM Quarterly. 18 (1). Manila, the Philippines: International Center for Living Aquatic Resources Management: 36–38. ISSN 0116-290X. OCLC 647653377.
- Koranteng, K.A.; Ofori-Danson, P.K.; Entsua-Mensah, M. (April 2000). "Fish and Fisheries of the Muni Lagoon in Ghana, West Africa". Biodiversity & Conservation. 9 (4). Berlin, Germany: Springer Science+Business Media: 487–499. Bibcode:2000BiCon...9..487K. doi:10.1023/A:1008903813222. ISSN 0960-3115. OCLC 5649327737.
- Entusua-Mensah, Mamaa (2002). "Traditional Management of Water Resources in West Africa". In Castelein, S.; Otte, S. (eds.). Conflict and Cooperation Related to International Water Resources: Historical Perspectives. International Water History Association's Conference on the Role of Water in History and Development, Bergen, Norway 10–12 August 2001. Vol. 62. Paris, France: UNESCO. pp. 49–57. OCLC 897440589. Report #SC-2002/WS/53.
- Nixon, Scott W.; Buckley, Betty A.; Granger, S. L.; Entsua-Mensah, M. (July 2007). "Anthropogenic Enrichment and Nutrients in Some Tropical Lagoons of Ghana, West Africa". Ecological Applications. 17 (Sp. 5). Columbus, Ohio: Ecological Society of America: S144–S164. doi:10.1890/05-0684.1. ISSN 1051-0761. OCLC 9981871056.
- Abdul-Razak, A.; Asiedu, A. B.; Entsua-Mensah, R. E. M.; deGraft-Johnson, K. A. A. (June 2009). "Assessment of the Water Quality of the Oti River in Ghana". West African Journal of Applied Ecology. 15 (1). Accra, Ghana: University of Ghana Ecological Laboratory: 1–12. doi:10.4314/wajae.v15i1.49427. ISSN 0855-4307. OCLC 813714658.
- Lorenzen, K.; Cowx, Ian G.; Entsua-Mensah, R. E. M.; Lester, N. P. (June 2016). "Stock Assessment in Inland Fisheries: A Foundation for Sustainable Use and Conservation". Reviews in Fish Biology and Fisheries. 26 (1). London, UK: Kluwer Academic Publishers: 405–440. Bibcode:2016RFBF...26..405L. doi:10.1007/s11160-016-9435-0. ISSN 0960-3166. OCLC 6763541076.
