= Letty Chiwara =

Zimbabwean human rights activist

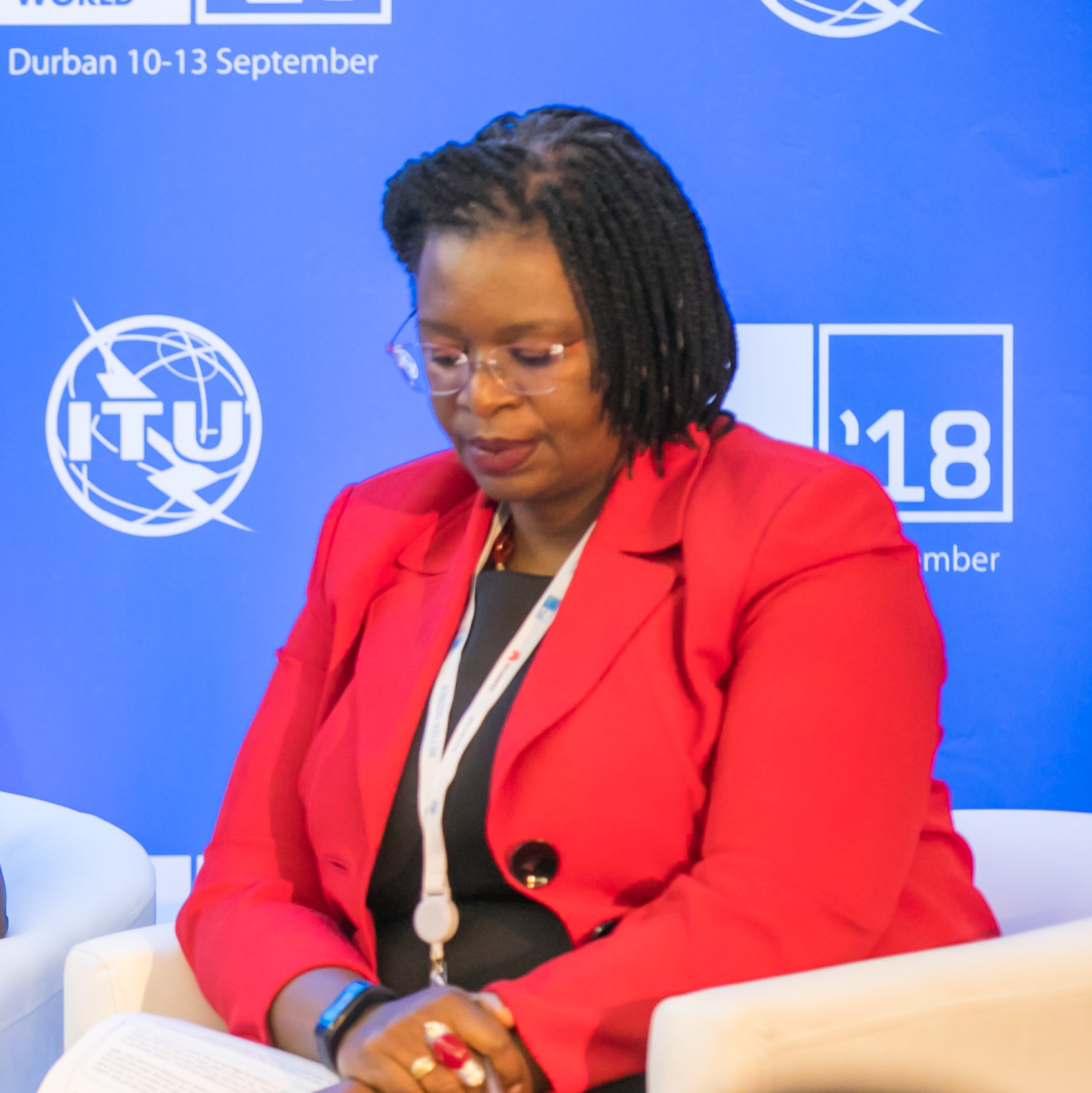
- Born: February 1967 (age 59); Zimbabwe, Africa
- Citizenship: Zimbabwe
- Education: University of KwaZulu-Natal (BA); University of Cambridge (MPhil); University of London
- Occupations: UN official; Consultant
- Employer(s): UN Women; United Nations
- Organizations: United Nations; UN Women; African Union Commission; United Nations Economic Commission for Africa
- Known for: Leadership in UN Women and gender equality advocacy in Africa
- Office: UN Women Representative in Malawi

Letty Chiwara (born February 1967) is a Zimbabwean official of the United Nations. She is the UN Women Representative in Malawi, the African Union Commission, and the UN Economic Commission for Africa, a position she assumed in May 2013. She formerly served as UN Women Representative in Ethiopia. She was the UNIFEM and UN Women Chief of Africa for 12 years, based in New York City, United States. Chiwara effectively led UN Women's strategic collaborations with a number of organizations, including the European Commission, the World Bank, the OECD DAG Gender Net, FEMNET, the YWCA, the African Union Commission, the UNECA, and the African Development Bank.

== Early life and education ==
Letty Chiwara grew up in an agricultural community in Zimbabwe with eight siblings, where girls typically received less educational opportunity and preferential treatment. However, her parents defied these norms and sent her to boarding school. Chiwara is one of eight children: five girls and three boys. Her parents were rural farmers who rejected the local norm of educating only boys, and sent all their children to school. She attended an expensive Catholic boarding school that she credits with forming a solid foundation for her career. Both her Bachelor of Arts and Master of Philosophy degrees were in Social and Political Theory, from the University of Kwa-Zulu Natal and the University of Cambridge respectively. At the University of London, she took a gender course taught by feminist scholar Caroline Moser that “opened up my eyes” and led her to join the movement to change cultural and traditional practices that hold women and girls back.

== Career ==
Chiwara worked in her home country of Zimbabwe as a town planning officer in Matabeleland South in Harare for four years. While working in this role, she received a scholarship to pursue a master's degree in Urban Development Planning at the University of London. A gender course during her studies inspired her to address disparities.

Upon returning home to fulfill her scholarship's service requirement, Chiwara resigned from her government job. After eight months, she was hired as a consultant with UNIFEM in Harare. This initial project involved bringing women from the Southern African Development Community to a trade fair. She now has a leadership position with UN Women in Ethiopia, where she collaborates with the African Union Commission and the UN Economic Commission for Africa. She led the Africa Unite Campaign against violence against women and girls and is currently leading efforts to develop an initiative focused on ending harmful practices and child marriage in Africa.
