= Japanese people in South Africa =

- (Japan) (South Africa)

Total population
- 3,059

Regions with significant populations
- Cape Town and Johannesburg

Languages
- English · Afrikaans · Other Languages of South Africa · Japanese

Religion
- Buddhism · Shinto

Related ethnic groups
- Japanese diaspora, Asian South Africans

There is a small community of Japanese expatriate people living in or people who were born in South Africa with Japanese ancestry. Most of them live in Johannesburg and other major cities.

According to the 2011 census, Asians account for 2.5% of South Africa's total population. While the Indian, Chinese, and Vietnamese South African populations are relatively large, the number of Japanese is small and largely focused in Johannesburg and Cape Town.

== History ==
Japanese immigration to South Africa began when Japan emerged as the country's largest trading partner when it was under apartheid.

=== Pre-Apartheid ===
The 1913 "Admission of Persons to the Union Regulation Act no. 22" presented an early obstacle to trade relations between South Africa and Japan. This immigration act banned all Asians, including Japanese, as "prohibited immigrants." Daniel François Malan argued that Japan was vitally important to South Africa as a long-term ally to combat the influence of communism. In 1930 he successfully persuaded the government to exclude Japanese from the "prohibited immigrants" category on this basis. He subsequently successfully lobbied to exclude Japanese from the decision of the Select Committee on the Liquor Bill which prohibited Asians from drinking in the Union, stating that the Japanese are "our friends."

On December 8, 1941, the South African government declared war with Japan following the attack on Pearl Harbor. D. F. Malan defended Japanese expansion, declaring Soviet communism as the real threat. He continued to support pro-Japan economic policies through his political career.

=== Apartheid: 1948 - 1994 ===
As the Prime Minister of the Union of South Africa from 1948 until 1954, D. F. Malan laid the foundations for apartheid by implementing segregationist policy. He also strengthened trade relations between Japan and South Africa after WWII due to Japan's need for industrial raw materials.

Hendrik Verwoerd served as the prime minister of the Union of South Africa until 1961 and prime minister of the Republic of South Africa until 1966. The establishment of a democratic government in 1961 was accompanied by the establishment of the Johannesburg branch of JETRO, the Japanese External Trade Organization. However, full diplomatic relations were not established until 1992.

In the early 1960s, Tokyo's Yawata Iron & Steel Co. announced a possible $250 million industrial contract. Over the next ten years, Yawata Iron & Steel Co. would purchase 5,000,000 tons of pig iron from South Africa. To avoid insulting Japanese trade delegations that would begin making regular visits to South Africa, Verwoerd pushed Pretoria's Group Areas Board to award Japanese the status of "honorary whites." Due to inconsistencies with the apartheid, opposition party politicians and the press since the early 1960s questioned why Japanese were granted special privileges. The designation gave the Japanese nearly all the same rights and privileges as whites, excepting the right to vote and conscription. Immigration from Japan declined due to Japan's economic downturn when apartheid ended.

In 1989, Japan introduced GGP (Grant assistance for Grassroots human security Projects). The stated goal was to fund relatively small development projects initiated by nonprofit organizations which address the well-being of disadvantaged communities. Between 1990 and 2016, this program would provide $438 million ZAR to 612 different projects.

=== Post-Apartheid ===
Japan's aid goals toward South Africa have grown in recent years. Toward the end of apartheid, Japan launched TICAD (Tokyo International Conference on African Development) to provide assistance to African countries. To date, six conferences have been held. At TICAD V in June 2013, Japanese Prime Minister Shinzo Abe pledged $14 billion in Official Development Assistance (ODA) to Africa over the next five years.

Japan and South Africa also have growing economic relations. In 2013, Japan was South Africa's 3rd largest export destination and 6th largest import source

== Education ==
There is one Japanese international school in South Africa, the Japanese School of Johannesburg.

== Notable individuals ==
- Lalla Hirayama: TV Host, actress, dancer, model (Originally from Hiratsuka, Kanagawa, Japan)
- Kotaro Matsushima: Rugby player (Born in Pretoria, South Africa to a Japanese mother and a Zimbabwean Shona father)

== See also ==
- Nippon Club (Johannesburg)
- Japan–South Africa relations
- Honorary Whites
- Honorary Aryan
- Asian South Africans
