= Dinah Musindarwezo =

Dinah Musindarwezo is a Rwandan feminist and pan-African women's rights activist. She is director of policy and communications at Womankind Worldwide, and the former executive director of the African Women's Development and Communication Network (FEMNET).

== Life ==
In 2010 Musindarwezo was working as a gender equality specialist for Norwegian People's Aid in Rwanda.

In 2012 she became executive director of FEMNET, based in Kenya. As FEMNET executive director, she expressed outrage in June 2017 at Tanzanian president John Magufuli's call to exclude pregnant students from education:

With all the work we have done to emancipate Africa’s girl-child from the shackles of discrimination and violation, a sitting president turns around to "re-victimize" and treat their situation like a terrible infectious disease which other girls must be protected from.

In February 2018 she convened a two-day meeting in Addis Ababa for African women's rights activists to strategise ahead of the annual United Nations Commission on the Status of Women.

Musindarwezo resigned from FEMNET in 2018. She became director of policy and communications at Womankind Worldwide, a UK-based organisation supporting women's rights groups in Africa and Asia. There she has highlighted the gendered effect of the debt of developing countries, and on the progressive exclusion of civil society organizations from development financing discussion in the aftermath of the Addis Ababa Action Agenda. In April 2020 she called on the African Union to negotiate debt repayment delays for member states, to allow African countries to concentrate on fighting the COVID-19 pandemic.

== Works ==
- (with Tim Jones) Debt and gender equality: How debt-servicing conditions harm women in Africa, Bretton Woods Observer, Spring 2019.
