= Asian (South Africa) =

South African Asians

In South Africa, Asian usually refers to people of Indian and other South Asian ancestry, more commonly called Indian South Africans. They are largely descended from people who migrated to South Africa in the late 19th and early 20th century from British Raj.

The "Indian"/"Asian" identity was codified by law under Apartheid as a race group. This term excluded other peoples from Continental Asia, including East Asians, such as the Chinese South Africans, who were either classified as Cape Coloureds or Honorary whites, West Asians (particularly the Lebanese and Syrians), who were originally classified as "Asian" until the early 1900s, and later as "white", or groups like the Cape Malays who have some degree of Southeast Asian ancestry, and were classified as a subgroup of Coloured.

== Indians ==
There are more than 1 million Indians in South Africa, like the Indians of Burma, most of whom are descended from indentured labourers who were brought into the country by the British Raj from India in the mid-19th century. They were hired to work in sugar plantations or mines (especially coal) in the Colony of Natal (now KwaZulu-Natal). Traders, known as Passenger Indians also subsequently immigrated. Since 1994 however, there has been a steady trickle of immigrants from the Indian subcontinent. Most Indian South Africans live in KwaZulu-Natal, particularly in the cities of Durban, Pietermaritzburg and their surrounding areas.

== Chinese ==
The smaller Chinese community was initially descended from migrant workers who came to work in the gold mines around Johannesburg in the late nineteenth century. Some of those workers were repatriated. Estimates vary, but the Chinese population is reckoned to have increased from 10,000 in the early 1980s to more than 100,000 in the early 2000s.

Chinese immigration caused difficulties for the apartheid regime. Based on the earlier status of Chinese as indentured labourers, the government classified immigrants from mainland China as "non-white", in particular as coloureds, and therefore subject to numerous restrictions in residence, voting, education, work, free movement, etc. In 1984, South African Chinese, now increased to about 10,000, received some rights of given to the Japanese who had honorary white status in South African, that is, to be treated as whites in terms of the Group Areas Act only as they didn't acquire all of the official rights of Honorary White status and thus could not do things such as vote or be eligible for conscription.

In late 2006, the Chinese Association of South Africa filed suit to have Chinese South Africans recognised as having been disadvantaged under apartheid, to benefit from Black Economic Empowerment (BEE). Complicating this attempt was the presence of recent immigrant Chinese who had not been disadvantaged by apartheid. They greatly outnumber native Chinese South Africans. Because Chinese under apartheid had somewhat less rigid restrictions than indigenous blacks, some people argued against their receiving benefits. In addition, the status of Japanese and South Koreans as honorary whites under apartheid complicated the case. Nonetheless, in June 2008, Chinese South Africans were fully recognised as having been disadvantaged and entered the BEE ethnic groups if they arrived before 1994.

== Other groups from Asia ==
=== Other East Asians ===
For separate political reasons, the government had classified Japanese, South Koreans, and Taiwanese, as honorary whites, and thus were granted the same privileges as whites. There is a small community of Koreans in South Africa, numbering 3,480 people; it began to form mostly in the 1990s, and includes expatriates sent by South Korean companies, students of English, and individual entrepreneurs.

=== South Asians ===
==== Pakistanis ====
Descendants of people who migrated to South Africa in the 19th and early 20th centuries from the pre-partition regions that became Pakistan are part of the South African Indian community. A number of people from Pakistan have also immigrated to South Africa following the end of apartheid. A substantial number of Pakistanis, most of them belonging to the Muhajir community of Karachi, moved to South Africa in the early 1990s. They largely reside in the bigger cities.

==== Sri Lankans ====
During the Dutch Empire of the 17th and 18th centuries, many slaves were brought from the island of Sri Lanka (then Ceylon). In the early 18th century, half of the slaves of Cape came from the colonies of India and Ceylon.

=== Southeast Asians ===
The Cape Malays are a Muslim group with some Pribumi Indonesian and Malay ancestry that originated at the Cape during the period of Dutch colonisation. During the apartheid regime, they were both classified as part of the "Coloured" racial group and thus considered "non-white" and treated as such.

South Africans of Filipino descent were classified as "black" due to historical outlook on Filipinos by White South Africans, and many of them lived in bantustans, which were areas set aside to be inhabited by Black South Africans.

=== West Asians ===
Certain people from West Asia, particularly Syrians, Lebanese, Palestinians, Jordanians, Iraqis, Saudis, Yemenis, Gulf Arabs, Iranians, and Turks were originally classified as "Asian" and therefore "non-white". In 1913, Moses Gadur sued the government after being denied the right to purchase land in Johannesburg on the basis of being considered non-white. Moses Gandur's lawyers successfully argued that Jewish immigrants, who were part of the same Semitic race, were not considered "Asian" the same way other people from the Levant were. Therefore, if they were subject to these laws, the Jews should also be affected. Ultimately, the agreement was that the laws only apply to coloured people and "yellow" Asiatics, and not them.

== See also ==
- Asian Africans
