= Japan–South Africa relations =

- Japan: South Africa

Japan–South Africa relations are the current and historical bilateral relations between Japan and South Africa.

== History ==
The genesis of trade relations between Japan and the future South Africa date to 1643 when Jan van Riebeeck first arrived at Dejima in Nagasaki harbor. Reebeck accompanied Jan van Elseracq, who was the representative of the Dutch East Indies Company (VOC) in Japan. Seven years later in 1650, Riebeck proposed selling hides of South African wild animals to Japan.

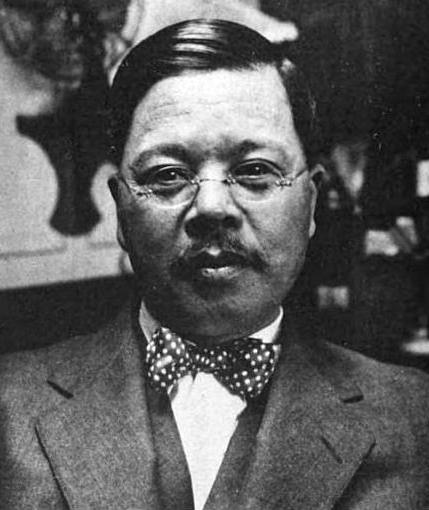
Furuya Komahei, the first Japanese businessman in South Africa.

In 1898, Furuya Komahei was the first Japanese businessman to open a shop in South Africa. The Cape Town store was called Mikado Shōten (Emperor Shop). It stayed open until 1942, when it was closed and confiscated by the government.

In 1904, Iwasaki Kanzō's small businesses in Durban were assisted by the Japanese Ministry of Agriculture and Commerce.

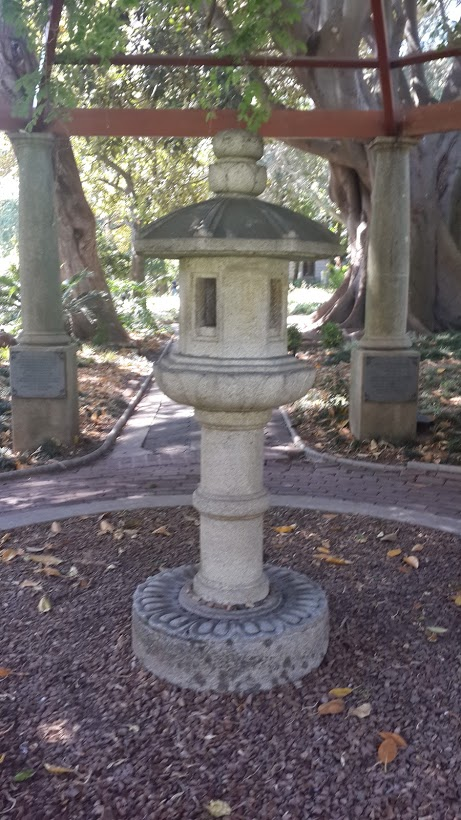
The Japanese Lantern Monument in Cape Town's Company's Gardens was given as a gift to South Africa by the Japanese government in 1932.

Japan opened a consulate in Cape Town in 1918. The Japanese government in 1932 erected a stone lantern in the Company's Gardens of Cape Town in appreciation of their benevolence towards Japanese immigrants in the 1930s.

Japan began actively trading with South Africa for natural resources since the 1960s, despite international sanctions at the time in response to the latter's Apartheid government. As a result, Japanese in South Africa were granted the honorary white status, much to the complaint of South African opposition party politicians and the press which questioned why the Japanese were granted special privileges. In addition, Japan's support and passive posture toward white minority rule brought about criticism from other African nations. In 1983, Tanzanian Ambassador to Japan, Ahmed Hassan Diria, pointed out that profits generated from Japanese tourists visiting South Africa helped strengthen apartheid.

Since 1994, greater co-operation between Japan and South Africa has been limited by domestic bureaucratic and institutional conflicts within both countries. South Africa was not invited by Japan to the 2023 G7 conference causing speculation in the media that it was snub for South Africa's non-critical diplomatic position regarding Russia's 2022 invasion of Ukraine.

== Resident diplomatic missions ==
- Japan has an embassy in Pretoria and a consular office in Cape Town.
- South Africa has an embassy in Tokyo.

== See also ==
- Foreign relations of Japan
- Foreign relations of South Africa
- Japanese people in South Africa
