= Lynne Muthoni Wanyeki =

Human rights activist

Lynne Mūthoni Wanyeki
- Born: 1972 (age 53–54)
- Education: School of Oriental and African Studies (PhD) Sciences Po (MPA) University of New Brunswick (BS)
- Years active: September 2017 - October 2024
- Employer: Open Society Foundation
- Known for: Human rights, gender equality and democratic governance across Africa

Lynne Mūthoni Wanyeki (born 1972) is a Kenyan political scientist, human rights activist, journalist, and the current regional director of Open Society Foundation's Africa regional office. Wanyeki is the former regional director of Amnesty International's regional office for East Africa, the Horn, and the Great Lakes. She is also the former executive director of the Kenya Human Rights Commission and the African Women's Development and Communication Network (FEMNET).

== Early life and education ==
Wanyeki was born in 1972 to a Canadian mother and Kenyan (Kikuyu) father, and grew up in Kenya. Her father died in 1991.

She holds a BA in Political Science (international relations) and French (literature) from the University of New Brunswick and Simon Fraser University respectively. Wanyeki also holds an MPA (cum laude) in public affairs from L’Institut d’études politiques in Paris and is currently pursuing her doctoral studies in the Department of Politics and International Studies at the School of Oriental and African Studies (SOAS). Wanyeki's PhD thesis at SOAS is titled "‘African solutions for African problems’: the question of member states’ compliance with the African Union using Kenya as a case study."

== Career ==
Wanyeki began her work as an activist focused on women's rights in 1988, while studying for her undergraduate degree in Canada. In Canada she also got her start in media, working with local newspapers and radio stations on issues related to immigrant and refugee women.

Upon returning to Kenya after college, one of Wanyeki's first jobs involved development work in rural Ukambani, where she conducted volunteer work for Oxfam and the United Nations Environmental Programme. In the late-1990s, she worked in Nairobi for Inter Press Services, an advocacy news organisation, and for ECO News Africa. While in her early thirties she succeeded Njoki Wainaina as executive director of FEMNET. At first, she viewed the organization as one dominated by a board of conservative older women. Later she found that her position gave her credibility as a highly sought-after speaker on human rights, gender equity and development. She also started writing a weekly column in the East African newspaper.

In 2007, Wanyeki was named Executive Director of the Kenya Human Rights Commission, a post she held until June 2011. Appointed during the political crisis in early 2008, she received death threats due to statements she had made about the elections, describing her as a traitor to the Kikuyu people. After leaving her role as executive director, Wanyeki served as a board member of the Kenya Human Rights Commission until mid-2017. As of 2011 she was a member of the International Advisory Network for the Business & Human Rights Resource Centre. She is currently a member of the board of the Open Society Justice Initiative. Wanyeki has previously served as Executive Director at the African Women's Development and Communication Network (FEMNET).

In March 2018, Wanyeki was one of eight columnists who quit the Nation Media Group in protest of what they considered to be increased meddling by the Kenyan government and infringements on freedom of the press.

== Bibliography ==
- "Choices we (must) make for ourselves: women and transnational media." Women in Action 1 (1): 26-28. 2004.
- Lynne Muthoni Wanyeki (2000). Up in the air: the state of broadcasting in eastern Africa. Panos Southern Africa. p. 140. ISBN 0-7974-2143-2.
- Lynne Muthoni Wanyeki, ed. (2003). Women and land in Africa: culture, religion and realizing women's right's. Zed Books. p. 384. ISBN 1-84277-096-9.
- Jacinta Muteshi; Lynne Muthoni Wanyeki; Maria Nzomo (2003). Transitional justice in Kenya: the gender question, Issue 4. Heinrich Böll Foundation, Regional Office, East and Horn of Africa. p. 117. ISBN 9966-9772-2-8.
