= Honorary whites =

Term used in apartheid era South Africa

Honorary whites was a political term that was used by the apartheid regime of South Africa to grant some of the rights and privileges of whites to those who would otherwise have been treated as non-whites under the Population Registration Act. It was enacted by the then-ruling National Party (NP).

This designation was made on a case-by-case basis as its underlying intent was utilized to select individuals within the context of various circumstances such as competitive sporting events and diplomatic exchanges. The term was also applied towards certain racial groups, most notably East Asians, who were ascribed as honorary whites. Such examples included the Japanese, Koreans (although this status was rejected by the South Korean state), Hong Kongers and Taiwanese who were granted the status, and later the local Chinese community of South Africa. Individually designated figures of various other races were also added.

== Designation of East Asians ==
=== Japanese ===
The designation was ascribed to the entire Japanese populace (who also once were ascribed as Honorary Aryans by Nazi Germany) in the 1960s. At the time, Japan was going through a post-war economic miracle, and this designation assisted a trade pact formed between South Africa and Japan in the early 1960s, when Tokyo's Yawata Iron & Steel Co. offered to purchase 5 million tonnes of South African pig iron, worth more than $250 million, over a 10-year period.

With such a huge deal in the works, then Prime Minister Hendrik Verwoerd determined that it would be tactless and disadvantageous to trade arrangements to subject the Japanese people to the same restrictions as other ethnic groups because trade delegations from Japan would regularly visit South Africa for business and trade.

Afterward, Pretoria's Group Areas Board publicly announced that all Japanese people would be considered white. Johannesburg's city officials even decided that, "in view of the trade agreements", the municipal swimming pools would be open to all Japanese guests.

The designation gave the Japanese almost all of the same rights and privileges as whites (except for the right to vote; they were also exempt from conscription). Until the early 1970s, opposition party politicians and the press questioned why Japanese were granted special privileges, citing hypocrisy and inconsistencies with apartheid.

=== Chinese ===
Chinese South Africans (simplified Chinese: 华裔南非人; traditional Chinese: 華裔南非人) are Overseas Chinese who reside in South Africa, including those whose ancestors came to South Africa in the early 20th century until Chinese immigration was banned under the Chinese Exclusion Act of 1904.

As with other non-White South Africans, the Chinese suffered from discrimination during apartheid, and were often classified as Coloureds, but sometimes as Asians, a category that was generally reserved for Indian South Africans. Under the apartheid-era Population Registration Act, 1950, Chinese South Africans were deemed "Asiatic", then "Coloured", where they were forcefully removed from areas declared "Whites only" areas by the government under the Group Areas Act in 1950 and governed as "Coloured".

The new designation of "Honorary whites" granted in the 1960s to the Japanese seemed grossly unfair to South Africa's small Chinese community (roughly 7,000 at that time), who, it seemed, would enjoy none of the new benefits given to the Japanese. As Time quoted one of Cape Town's leading Chinese businessmen, "If anything, we are whiter in appearance than our fellow Japanese friends." Another indignantly demanded: "Does this mean that the Japanese, now that they are "considered" white, cannot associate with us without running afoul of the Immorality Act?"

Furthermore, with the inclusion of other East Asians from Taiwan and Hong Kong as honorary whites complicated matters on how the local Chinese were treated, and apartheid regulation on Chinese varied from department to department and province to province as locals could not distinguish East Asians apart from each other, due to similar genetic traits and physical appearance. This caused confusion and discontent among the local Chinese community as they had fewer rights compared to their Hong Kong and Taiwanese counterparts despite no differences in ethnic background and physical appearance. This uncertainty fueled the emigration of the Chinese South Africans to other countries in similar manner to other "Coloureds" under the Apartheid regime, as it demonstrated that such a status was primarily influenced by geopolitical factors rather than racial considerations.

In 1984, the Group Areas Act was amended to allow Chinese South Africans to live in areas the government had declared white areas and use the facilities within them. Chinese South Africans were required to apply for a permit from the government in order to move into a white area. Restrictions still apply where a Chinese family that wanted to move into a white suburb had to ask the permission of their neighbors – ten houses to the front, ten to the back and ten on each side of the house they intended to call home.

=== Hong Kongers ===
In spite of the tense relations between the apartheid regime and the United Kingdom, Hong Kong, a British colony at the time, continued to engage in trade with South Africa. As an incentive of attracting investment in South Africa, Hong Kongers were granted honorary white status by the South African government, enabling them to facilitate their living accommodations and investment activities.

=== Koreans ===
Unlike Japan and Taiwan (ROC), South Korea was unwilling and uninterested in accepting honorary white status and eventually outright refused to establish diplomatic relations with South Africa over apartheid. Although South Africa offered honorary white status to South Korean citizens when the two countries negotiated diplomatic relations in 1961, South Korea severed ties with South Africa in protest of apartheid, and full diplomatic relations between the two countries were not re-established until 1992, when apartheid was abolished.

=== Taiwanese ===
The Apartheid regime enjoyed warm relationship with the Republic of China (ROC), informally Taiwan, as South Africa continued to recognize the Republic of China over the People's Republic of China (PRC) under the One China Policy. South Africa's National Party (NP) also supported Taiwan's Chinese Nationalists in their claimants to mainland China and the South China Sea.

The inclusion of the Taiwanese was an important decision for relations between South Africa and Taiwan, as both countries were becoming increasingly isolated from the international community and treated as pariah states; especially after the Republic of China lost its seat that represented "China" at the United Nations (UN) to the People's Republic of China with Resolution 2578. In 1980, Premier Sun Yun-suan made an official visit to the country.

Granting Honorary White status to the Taiwanese further warmed relations and allowed immigration of Chinese into South Africa since the enforcement of the Chinese Exclusion Act of 1904. Generous incentives and subsidies were offered to the Taiwanese to settle and invest in South Africa, and Taiwan had become South Africa's fifth largest trading partner by 1979, especially in regards to weapons exports which the country desperately needed due to sanctions while fighting the South African Border War.

== Others ==
The "honorary white" status was given to other special visitors belonging to other races, including:

- Guyanese author E. R. Braithwaite, who wrote a scathing book Honorary White: Visit to South Africa about his stay;
- Cricketers in the West Indian rebel teams;
- Players of Polynesian (a sub group of Austronesian) Maori or Samoan backgrounds in the 1970 touring All Blacks rugby team
- Australian Aboriginal tennis player Evonne Goolagong Cawley.
- African American tennis player Arthur Ashe was also offered Honorary White status but he refused and explicitly demanded to be booked as a Black man when he visited and played in South Africa.
- Malawian diplomats

== See also ==
- Becoming white thesis
- Honorary Aryan
- Honorary male
- Model minority
- Racial hierarchy
- Ozawa v. United States
- An Investigation of Global Policy with the Yamato Race as Nucleus
- Sarah Rector ('Given her wealth, in 1913, the Oklahoma Legislature made an effort to have her declared white')
