= Nippon Club (Johannesburg) =

The Nippon Club of South Africa (Nan A Nihonjihkai) was founded in 1961 as a social club for Japanese nationals in the Johannesburg area.

The Nippon Club is the only Japanese social club in South Africa. The club's dual purpose is to help enhance the unity of the Japanese South African community and to help develop evolving relationships with the South African people. The Nippon Club has fostered ongoing business and cultural relationships through various events.
