= Mamadou Doumbia =

Mamadou Doumbia may refer to:

- Mamadou Doumbia (footballer, born 1980), Ivorian football defender
- Mamadou Doumbia (footballer, born 1995), Malian football defender for Young Africans
- Mamadou Doumbia (footballer, born 2006), Malian football forward for Watford

== See also ==
- Mahamadou Doumbia, Malian footballer (born 2004)
