= Mama Koite Doumbia =

Malian politician (born 1950)

Mama Koite Doumbia is a Malian and a member of the Economic, Social and Cultural Council of the African Union, representing West Africa.

Mama Koite Doumbia holds a higher diploma in youth training. She was elected chairperson of the African Women's Development and Communication Network (FEMNET) in 2003. In this role she was a member of the Permanent Committee of the Economic, Social and Cultural Council of the African Union. In February 2011 she received the 2011 FAMEDEV Gender Award.
