= Klaus von Grebmer =

Swiss-German economist

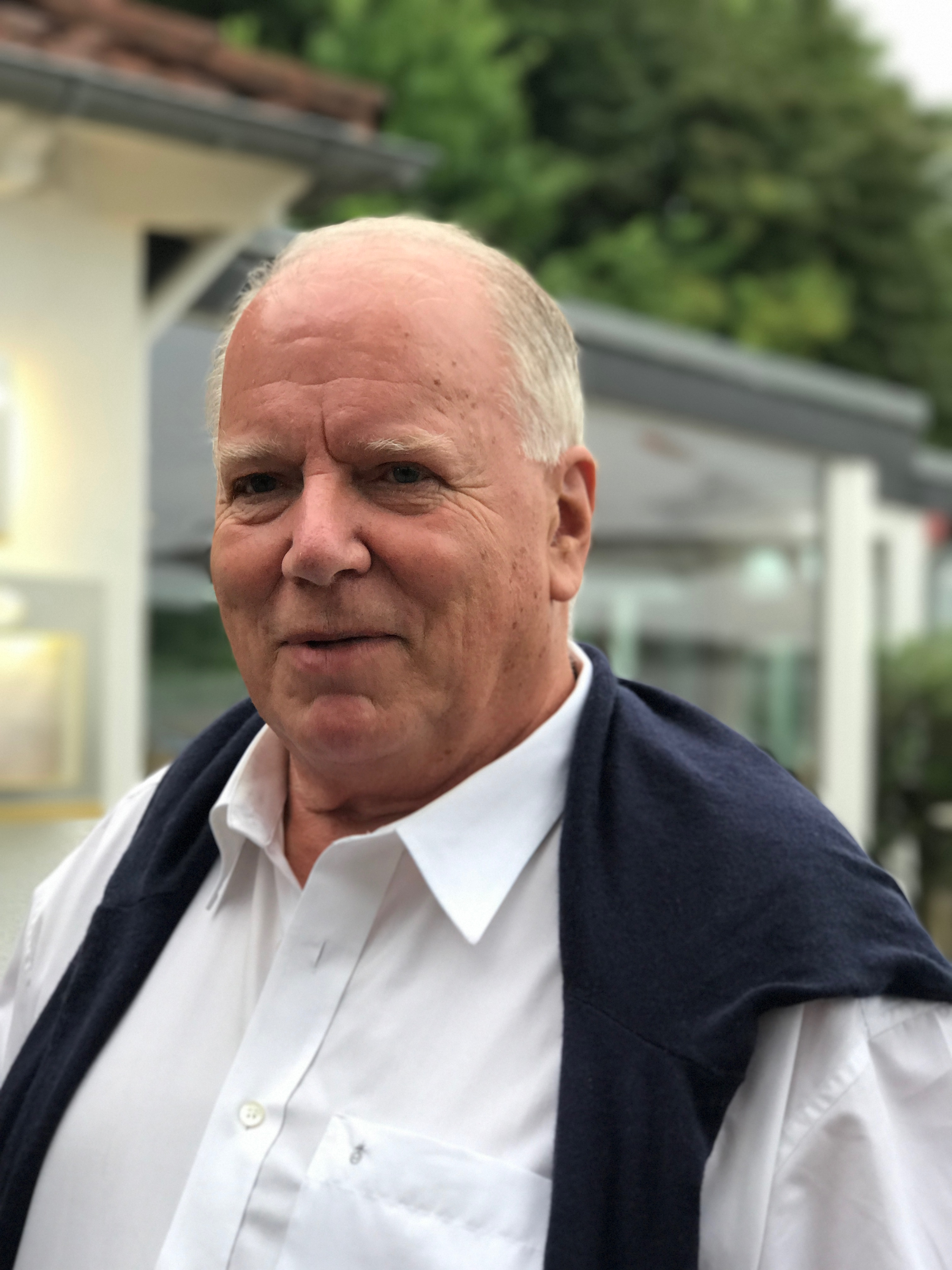

International Food Policy Research Institute Research Fellow Emeritus and Strategic Advisor
- Incumbent
- Assumed office 2012
- President: Shenggen Fan

Personal details
- Education: University of Kiel (M.Ec., Ph.D.); Department of Economics
- Scientific career
- Fields: Economics
- Workplaces: University of Kiel; Prognos AG Business Consultants; F. Hoffman-La Roche AG, Basel Switzerland; Ciba-Geigy, Basel, Switzerland; University of Konstanz; Healthecon AG, Basel, Switzerland; Universitätsseminar der Deutschen Wirtschaft, Berlin, Germany; Novartis Crop Protection AG, Basel, Switzerland; World Bank; International Food Policy Research Institute

Klaus von Grebmer, descendant of an old Austrian family Grebmer zu Wolfsthurn, is a Swiss-German economist and one of the pioneers of the Global Hunger Index. He is currently a Research Fellow Emeritus and Strategic Adviser at the International Food Policy Research Institute since 2012. Klaus von Grebmer joined the International Food Policy Research Institute as Director of the Communications Division in 1999. During 2013 von Grebmer served as acting director for Communications and Marketing at WorldFish.

== Education and career ==
Von Grebmer earned a M. Ec. in 1970 and a Ph.D. in economics in 1972, both from the University of Kiel, Kiel, Germany. Von Grebmer worked for over 26 years in the private sector as a consultant, health economist, and senior manager in communications. While at Ciba-Geigy, he served as a senior communications manager during the crisis of a drug produced by Ciba-Geigy believed to cause the Sub-acute Myelo-Optic Neuropathy (SMON)] in Japan starting in 1980, as reported in the book Bad Medicine: The Prescription Drug Industry in the Third World.

From 1973 to 1976 von Grebmer was an associate lecturer on Health Economics at the University of Konstanz, Germany, and one semester at the University of St. Gallen, Switzerland, and at the Nuremberg Institute of Technology Georg Simon Ohm, Germany. During 1998, von Grebmer joined the World Bank Executive Staff Exchange Program as a Principal Operations Officer in rural development.

In 1999, von Grebmer joined the International Food Policy Research Institute as Director of Communication and stayed in that position until 2011. Under his leadership, the first edition of the Global Hunger Index was launched in 2006; von Grebmer was one of the promoters of publishing a hunger index that would support the public debate on the issues of hunger. He encouraged the author Doris Wiesmann who wrote an initial research paper on indexing hunger under the leadership of Joachim von Braun to move in this direction. In 2015, von Grebmer co-authored the working paper Methodological Review and Revision of the Global Hunger Index which has since then been the basis of an improved and revived Global Hunger Index. He is the lead author of the Global Hunger Indexes from 2006 till today. The index is frequently mentioned in the media around the world as a source to characterize the hunger situation in a given country.

== Awards and honours ==
Von Grebmer received in 2008 for the International Food Policy Research Institute the COM+ Communications Award from the Alliance of Communicators for Sustainable Development.

The Global Hunger Index has won The Mercury Gold Award for best non-profit-human welfare report twice. The 2010 Global Hunger Index: The challenge of hunger, won the Best of Annual Reports for DEUTSCHE WELTHUNGERHILFE E.V.in the 2010/2011 Mercury Excellence Award. The 2011 Global Hunger Index, The Challenge of Hunger: Taming price spikes and excessive food price volatility, won the Best of Annual Reports and Overall Presentation for Europe.

== Recent publications ==
=== Journal articles and book chapters ===
- von Grebmer Klaus. How to Accelerate the End of Hunger and Undernutrition. In:Biesalski HK, Birner R (eds): Hidden Hunger: Strategies to Improve Nutrition Quality. World Rev Nutr Diet. Basel, Karger, 2018, vol 118, pp 93–101.
- von Grebmer, K. and Omamo, S. W. (2007), Options for a rational dialogue on the acceptance of biotechnology. Biotechnology Journal, 2: 1121–1128.
- Gregory, Peter, von Grebmer Klaus, and Ehart Orlo. Risk Assessment Data for GM Crops. Science 27 APR 2001:638-639.

=== Books and reports ===
- von Grebmer, Klaus; Bernstein, Jill; Hammond, Laura; Patterson, Fraser; Sonntag, Andrea; Klaus, Lisa; Fahlbusch, Jan; Towey, Olive; Foley, Connell; Gitter, Seth; Ekstrom, Kirstin; and Fritschel, Heidi. 2018. 2018 Global Hunger Index: Forced Migration and Hunger. Bonn and Dublin: Welthungerhilfe, and Concern Worldwide.
- von Grebmer, Klaus; Bernstein, Jill; Hossain, Naomi; Brown, Tracy; Prasai, Nilam; Yohannes, Yisehac; Patterson, Fraser; Sonntag, Andrea; Zimmerman, Sophia-Maria; Towey, Olive; and Foley, Connell. 2017. 2017 Global Hunger Index: The inequalities of hunger. Washington, D.C.; Bonn; and Dublin: International Food Policy Research Institute, Welthungerhilfe, and Concern Worldwide
- Béné, C., Headey, D., Haddad, L. et al. Is resilience a useful concept in the context of food security and nutrition programmes? Some conceptual and practical considerations. Food Sec. (2016) 8: 123.
- Omamo, Steven Were, ed. and von Grebmer, Klaus, ed. 2005 Biotechnology, agriculture, and food security in Southern Africa. Washington D.C.:International food Policy Research Institute.
- von Grebmer, Klaus. 1983. Drug therapy and its price: a commercial perspective of the economic aspects of pharmaceutical pricing on a national and international level. Montreal: Medicop̈ea International, Inc.
