= Issa Doumbia =

Issa Doumbia may refer to:

- Issa Doumbia (actor) (born 1982), French actor and columnist
- Issa Doumbia (footballer) (born 2003), Italian footballer
