= Njoki Wainaina =

Gender and development consultant

Njoki Wainaina is a gender and development consultant from Kenya. She was the first executive director of the African Women's Development and Communication Network (FEMNET), formed in 1988.

== Career ==
Wainaina became involved in gender and development work in the early 1970s, and since then has been a leader in the women's movement in Kenya. She attended global meetings of the World Conference on Women in Mexico City (1975), Nairobi (1985) and Beijing (1995). Wainaina helped to pioneer FEMNET in the late 1970s. At FEMNET she coordinated and integrated gender concerns in the programs of development agencies in Kenya. She has campaigned for male support in eliminating discrimination against women, particularly gender-based violence. When she retired from FEMNET she was succeeded by Lynne Muthoni Wanyeki, a radical feminist in her early thirties. As of 2010 Wainaina was almost 70, a wife, mother and grandmother, still active both in business and as a gender consultant.

== Views ==
Wainaina says that gender training involves challenging centuries-old structures, challenging power relations at the personal, family, community and national levels. She says "it can be a very threatening exercise". She has said of her work "Women's leadership is the most political work. First of all, we are fighting for rights. We are fighting for something somebody else has [that belongs to us]. So we have to fight them, persuade them. Trick them. So it is so political, You need to be very confident to just be able to continue and to say you know, yes, I understand what you are saying, but ... and to be able to keep your head and not get angry".

Wainaina is founder of Men for Gender Equality Now, a Kenyan NGO. She has explained of her work with men "There are many women today who feel that working with men and boys is diluting, diverting and trivializing our struggle. Many hold the view that because men and boys are the beneficiaries of male privilege and discrimination against women and girls, they can never understand our struggle. Many doubt that men and boys can commit to changes that would mean them losing the privileges they now enjoy. But, as understandings of gender, its social construction, maculinities, femininities and their impact on all deepen, it becomes clear that males have reasons to want to change as well and that gender equality would also benefit them. Work with men and boys for gender equality is only one of the many strategies that must be combined to tackle the ever-growing problems of inequality, injustice and oppression".

Wainaina has pointed out "The focus on the girl child since the Beijing Conference has particularly challenged men to look at the boy child. In several countries in Africa, gender programs are targeting boys because of the recognition that boys too suffer certain gender specific problems, especially arising from their socialization. There is, for example, growing concern that while girls have been overburdened with family responsibilities as helpers to their mothers, boys are growing up without learning and taking their responsibilities at their personal, family and community levels. The result is an increase in drug abuse, violence, crime and other social problems – a high social cost for the community".

== Bibliography ==
- Daudi N. Nturibi; Njoki Wainaina (1983). Planning and management of community projects: a manual on programme development, leadership training, and management of group projects. Planned Parenthood and Women's Development, IPPF Africa Region.
- Njoki Wainaina (1989). Indigenous savings & credit schemes for women in Kenya. The Authority. ASIN B0007C4R82.
- Njoki Wainaina; K. N. Bunjun; Irene Whalen-Hopwood (1990). Women in business: grassroots success stories from eastern and southern Africa. UNICEF. ISBN 92-806-0033-8.
- Njoki Wainaina (1994). The girl child in Malawi: a case for action. UNICEF Malaŵi.
- Njoki Wainaina (1998). Family planning, STD, HIV/AIDS programmes in the private sector: overview of case studies and strategy framework. JSI/STAFH.
- Njoki Wainaina (2002). FEMNET review report: male involvement in programmes to combat gender based violence : Malawi and South Africa, September–November 2002. African Women's Development and Communication Network.
- Njoki Wainaina (2003). Report of the review of male involvement in programmes to combat gender based violence in Ethiopia, March 30 to April 05, 2003. African Women's Development and Communication Network.
- Njoki Wainaina (2003). Strategic plan and programme 2003–2005: regional network of men against gender based violence. African Women's Development and Communication Network (FEMNET).

== Sources ==
- Mutua, Makau (2009). Human rights NGOs in East Africa: political and normative tensions. University of Pennsylvania Press. ISBN 978-0-8122-4112-9.
- Ngunjiri, Faith Wambura (2010). "Njoki Wainaina: Gender and Development Consultant". Women's spiritual leadership in Africa: tempered radicals and critical servant leaders. SUNY Press. p. 45. ISBN 978-1-4384-2977-9.
