= Sara Hlupekile Longwe =

Sara Longwe
- Born: c. 1950 (age c. 75)
- Known for: Feminist Activism
- Notable work: Longwe Framework for Gender Analysis
- Awards: Africa Prize for Leadership 2003

Sara Hlupekile Longwe (born c. 1950) is a consultant on gender and development based in Lusaka, Zambia. She was the chairperson of FEMNET between 1997 and 2003. She is the author of the Longwe Framework for Gender Analysis. Longwe describes herself as a radical feminist activist.

== Early struggles ==
When Longwe was a young secondary school teacher, the government refused to grant her maternity leave. This violated the government's obligation under an International Labour Organization convention. Longwe formed a lobbying group that succeeded in forcing the government to introduce maternity leave for teachers in 1974. In another run-in during her career as a teacher, she insisted on wearing trousers to school. The issue was escalated all the way to the Permanent Secretary of the Ministry of Education. In 1984, Longwe was a founding member of the Zambia Association for Research and Development. This group played a role in ensuring that the Zambian government ratified the Convention on the Elimination of All Forms of Discrimination Against Women.

== Women's Empowerment Framework ==
Longwe developed the Women's Empowerment Framework, or Longwe Framework, published in 1990. This Gender analysis framework helps planners understand the practical meaning of women's empowerment and equality, and then to evaluate whether a development initiative supports this empowerment. The basic premise is that women's development can be viewed in terms of five levels of equality: welfare, access, "conscientization", participation and control. Empowerment is essential at each of these levels. Welfare addresses basic needs, and access addresses ability to use resources such as credit, land and education. "Conscientization" is a key element of the framework: recognition that discrimination creates gender-related problems and women may themselves contribute to this discrimination. With participation, women are equal to men in making decisions, and with control the balance of power between the genders is equal.

== Views and controversy ==
In 1992, Longwe successfully sued the Intercontinental Hotel when she was refused entry to a bar in the hotel because she was not accompanied by a male. She won the case in the High Court of Zambia on the basis that discrimination against her sex was against the constitution. Longwe was chairperson of the African Women's Development and Communications Network (FEMNET) between 1997 and 2003. FEMNET, which was established in 1988, has the goal of assisting NGOs to contribute to women's development, equality and rights, and to provide an infrastructure for information and empowerment.

In 1998, Longwe said that the school system contributes to women's subordination, so lack of schooling should not be seen as a cause for the low socioeconomic status of women. Longwe has been outspoken in criticizing lack of progress in programs to reduce the marginalization of women since the 1985 World Conference on Women in Nairobi. She has said "Gender policies have a strange tendency to 'evaporate' within international development agencies". She talks of the "patriarchal cooking pot ... filled with patriarchal bias, implicit in the agency's values, ideology, development theory, organizational systems and procedures". Her views on roadblocks have been criticized by workers in the Oxfam agency as being too extreme.

Longwe was awarded the 2003 Africa Prize for Leadership.

== Sources ==
- Bradshaw, York W.; Ndegwa, Stephen N. (2000). The uncertain promise of Southern Africa. Indiana University Press. ISBN 0-253-33827-1.
- Eade, Deborah; Williams, Suzanne (1995). The Oxfam handbook of development and relief, Volume 1. Oxfam. ISBN 0-85598-307-8.
- Hertzog, Esther (2011). Patrons of Women: Literacy Projects and Gender Development in Rural Nepal. Berghahn Books. ISBN 978-1-84545-768-6.
- Leach, Fiona E. (2003). Practising gender analysis in education. Oxfam. ISBN 0-85598-493-7.
- March, Candida; Smyth, Inés A.; Mukhopadhyay, Maitrayee (1999). A guide to gender-analysis frameworks. Oxfam. ISBN 0-85598-403-1.
- "Remarks by Sara Longwe". The Hunger Project.
- "Profile of an ICT Champion: Sara Hlupekile Longwe". ICT. 16 July 2007.
- Sahay, Sushama (1998). Women and Empowerment: Approaches and Strategies. Discovery Publishing House. ISBN 81-7141-412-5.
- "Sara Longwe 2003 Africa Prize Laureate". The Hunger Project.
- Sweetman, Caroline (1997). Gender in development organisations. Oxfam. ISBN 0-85598-365-5.
- Sweetman, Caroline (2000). Women and leadership. Oxfam. ISBN 0-85598-452-X.
