= FEMNET =

Women's development nongovernmental organization

- Formation: 1988; 38 years ago
- Type: INGO
- Purpose: Promoting women's development
- Location: Nairobi, Kenya
- Official language: English, French
- Chairperson: Emma Kaliya
- Executive Director: Memory Kachambwa
- Website: www.femnet.org

FEMNET, also called the African Women's Development and Communication Network, is an organization established in 1984 to promote women's development in Africa. FEMNET helps non-government organizations share information and approaches on women's development, equality and other human rights.

== Activities ==
FEMNET was established by Eddah Gachukia, Njoki Wainaina, and Norah Olembo in 1984 to co-ordinate African preparations for the Third World Conference on Women held in Nairobi, Kenya, in 1985. As part of their role to organize African women to attend the conference, the three women registered FEMNET and drafted its constitution. The inaugural chair was Gachukia, who worked with Olembo, Wainaina, Sara Hlupekile Longwe, Pamela Kola, Mama Koite Doumbia to recruit women to plan the NGO Forum for the conference. The organization is based in Nairobi. FEMNET has worked with the United Nations Commission on the Status of Women, the World Conference against Racism and the African Union (AU). Areas of focus with the AU have included the protocol on the Rights of Women in Africa of the African Charter on Human and Peoples' Rights, the Economic, Social and Cultural Council and the New Partnership for African Development.

FEMNET ran its first gender-training workshop in 1990 in Kenya, working with the United Nations Children's Fund (UNICEF) and the Canadian International Development Agency (CIDA). The workshop helped to train trainers, and FEMNET refined the approach and developed material based on results. FEMNET ran training sessions in the 1993–1999 period in Swaziland, Zambia, the United States and Malawi. They were supported by the United Nations Population Fund (UNFPA), UNICEF and the United States Agency for International Development (USAID). FEMNET ran Train the Trainers sessions in 2000 for partner organizations in South Africa, Uganda and Ghana. Gender-based trainers have worked in many other countries in Africa.

FEMNET has found that it is critical to involve men in the fight for gender equality. Male gender trainers have had great influence in introducing gender awareness in sectors such as developmental research where gender concerns had previously been neglected. It was assumed that raising awareness of gender issues would be extremely difficult in Swaziland, with its strongly patriarchal traditions. In fact, as a result of FEMNET assistance through UNFPA, high-level policymakers became sensitized to gender issues and measures to address gender concerns were included in key national plans. Malawi, where FEMNET has worked with UNFPA and UNICEF, has been another country where great progress has been made in training and sensitizing political leader, agencies, and other organizations.

In July 2008, FEMNET coordinated the official launch in Nairobi of the United Nations' Gender Equality Architecture Reform (GEAR) Campaign in Africa. As of 2010, FEMNET was active through membership and local organizations in more than 37 African countries.

In 2013 FEMNET's President Emma Kaliya, who is from Malawi, spoke out on behalf of FEMNET regarding a case of gang rape in Kenya. The victim, "Liz", lost her ability to walk, while her attackers were sentenced to cut some grass and then released. Kaliya noted that the case was attracting international attention. The authorities were said to be rearresting the men involved. Women from 21 countries joined a protest march and a million signed a petition demanding that not only the attackers but also the police who mishandled the case should be imprisoned.

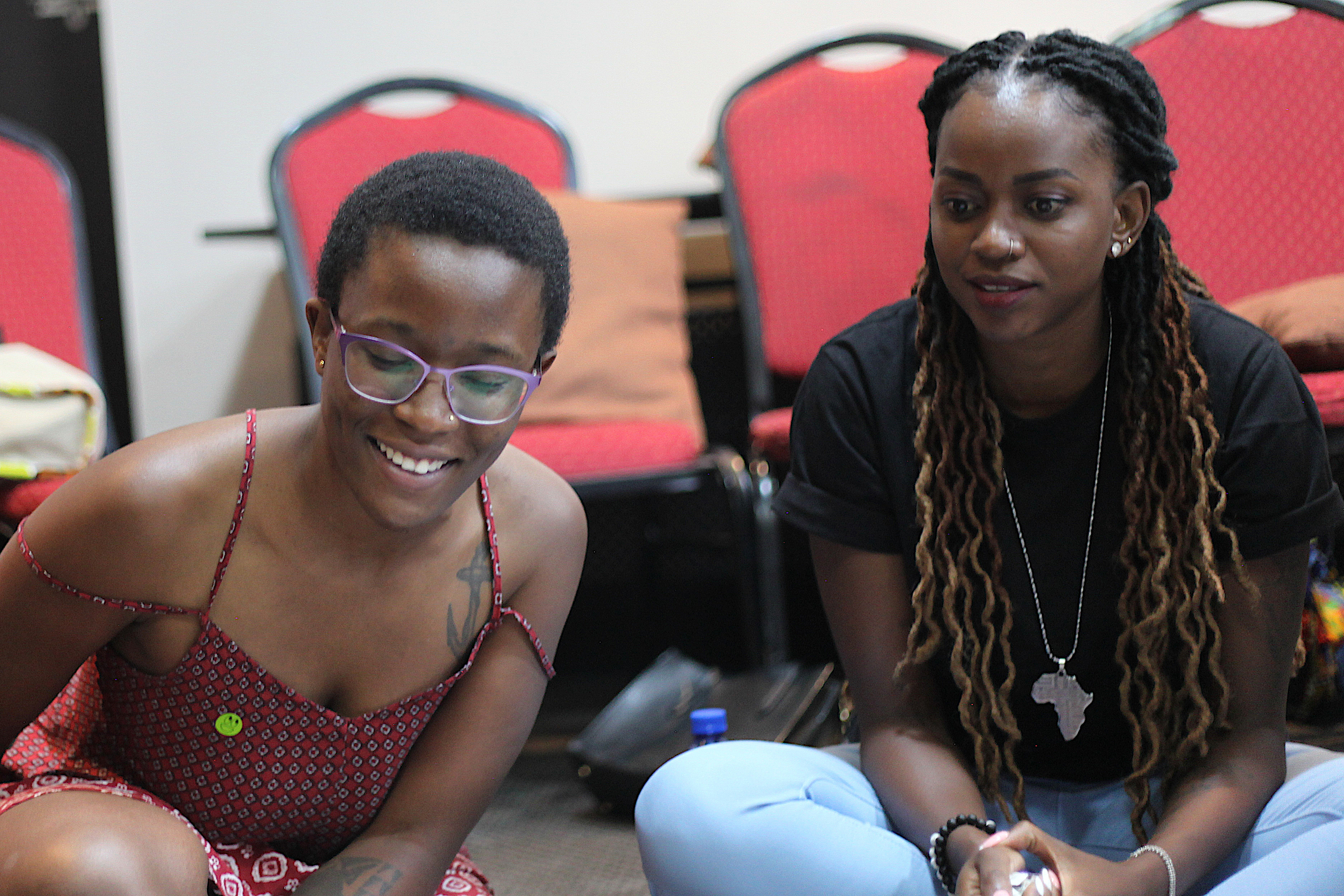
FEMNET's "Decolonizing The Internet" meeting in Zambia in 2022

In May 2017 FEMNETS President, Emma Kaliya, was re-elected unopposed at a meeting in Nairobi. The new board included treasurer Nancy Kinanu Gitonga from Kenya and the elected secretary was Charity Binka, from Ghana. Other members were Bibyshe, Takubusonga Mundjo, Patricia Munabi, Rafa Machava and Amany Asfour who were each from a different African country.

In September 2022 FEMNET organised a conference in collaboration with "Whose Knowledge" to discuss "Decolonizing The Internet" in Zambia.

== Former executive directors ==
- Njoki Wainaina, founding member
- Lynne Muthoni Wanyeki
- Dinah Musindarwezo

== Former chairpeople ==
- Eddah Gachukia, founding member and inaugural chair (1984–1992)
- Sara Hlupekile Longwe, winner of the 2003 Africa Prize for Leadership
- Mama Koite Doumbia, winner of the 2011 FAMEDEV Gender Award

== Other women associated with FEMNET ==
- Sandra Kwikiriza
