= Cleopatra Doumbia-Henry =

Dr. Cleopatra Doumbia-Henry
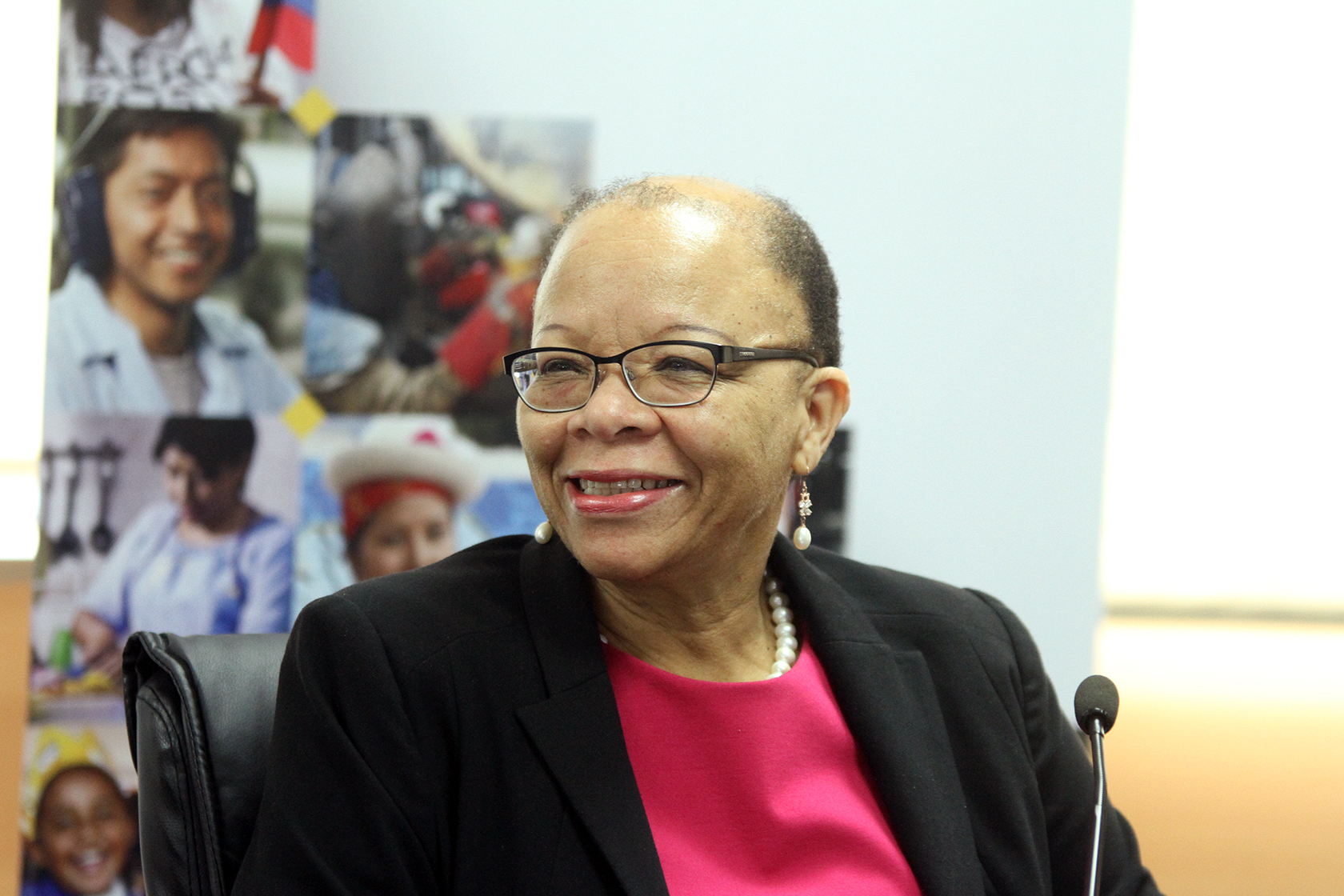
- Dr. Cleopatra Doumbia-Henry

President of the World Maritime University
- Incumbent
- Assumed office 28 June 2015
- Chancellor: Kitack Lim
- Preceded by: Björn Kjerve

Personal details
- Born: 1953 (age 72–73) Dominica
- Education: University of West Indies; University of Geneva; Graduate Institute of International Studies

Dr. Cleopatra Doumbia-Henry is President of the World Maritime University. She is an international lawyer, a global leader on maritime law, labour standards and labour law, and law of international organizations. Dr. Doumbia-Henry is a distinguished academic in the field of international law and an international advocate for sustainability and innovation.

Appointed by the Secretary-General of the International Maritime Organization (IMO), Dr. Doumbia-Henry became the seventh President, the first woman President and the first from a developing country of the World Maritime University (WMU), a university established within the framework of the IMO.

== Professional career ==
=== President of the World Maritime University ===
As the chief executive officer of WMU, she oversees and directs the operations and administration of the university, positioning it as the global centre of excellence in maritime and ocean education, research and capacity building, taking on board the UN SDGs.

=== Senior positions at the International Labour Organization (ILO) ===
Prior to joining WMU, Dr. Doumbia-Henry held various senior positions at the International Labour Organization (ILO), another specialized agency of the United Nations. She joined the ILO in 1986 and served as Senior Legal Officer in the Office of the Legal Adviser; Director, Sectoral Activities Department before taking up the position as Director of the International Labour Standards Department. During her tenure as Director of the International Labour Standards Department (first woman Director since the establishment of the ILO in 1919), Dr. Doumbia-Henry was responsible for the ILO's international labour standards policy and for the ILO's supervisory bodies and procedures governing international labour standards. She led the department to effectively assist the ILO member States on the implementation of their international obligations (more than 400 Conventions and Recommendations) including through technical assistance, advice, research and capacity building programmes. She spearheaded the development of the innovative and historic ILO Maritime Labour Convention (MLC), 2006 which consolidated 68 international labour instruments. The MLC, 2006 as amended has been ratified to date by 91 member States to date covering more than 80 per cent of the world tonnage of ships. Dr. Doumbia-Henry also led the ILO's participation in a number of IMO/ILO inter-agency collaborations on several issues of common interest, including the Joint IMO/ILO Ad Hoc Expert Working Groups on Fair Treatment of Seafarers and on Liability and Compensation regarding Claims for Death, Personal Injury and Abandonment of Seafarers.

== Maritime Labour Convention (MLC), 2006 ==
Dr. Doumbia-Henry led work on the ILO Maritime Labour Convention, 2006. This convention consolidates 68 ILO instruments and has achieved success among ILO Conventions, reflected in its high level of ratification—92 member states, covering more than 80 percent of the world’s shipping tonnage. Today, the MLC, 2006, stands as a flagship ILO instrument. Dr. Doumbia-Henry is widely known as the “Mother of the MLC, 2006.”

== Early career ==
Dr. Doumbia-Henry began her career at the University of the West Indies, Barbados, as lecturer in law and later worked at the Iran-US Claims Tribunal in The Hague, the Netherlands.

== Academic career ==
Dr. Doumbia-Henry's qualifications include Barrister-at-Law and Solicitor, a PhD and LLM from the University of Geneva and the Graduate Institute of International Studies, and an LL.M. and LLB from the University of West Indies. She has published extensively on a wide range of international law subjects.

== Select Publications ==
- Doumbia-Henry, C. (2020). Shipping and covid-19: Protecting seafarers as frontline workers. WMU Journal of Maritime Affairs, 19(3), 279–293. https://doi.org/10.1007/s13437-020-00217-9
- Doumbia-Henry, C. (2019). Foreword for joma December 2019—empowering women in the Maritime Community: The way ahead. WMU Journal of Maritime Affairs, 18(4), 521–524. https://doi.org/10.1007/s13437-019-00187-7
- Doumbia-Henry, C. (2017). The Maritime Labour Convention, 2006, legal jurisdiction and Port State Control. Shipping Operations Management, 129–151. https://doi.org/10.1007/978-3-319-62365-8_6
- Doumbia-Henry, C. (2016). Maritime, Oceans and sustainability - a way forward. WMU Journal of Maritime Affairs, 15(1), 1–4. https://doi.org/10.1007/s13437-016-0100-1
