= Tropical Medicine & International Health =

- Discipline: Medicine
- Language: English

Publication details
- Publisher: Wiley
- Impact factor: 3.918 (2021)

Standard abbreviations
- ISO 4: Trop. Med. Int. Health

Links
- Journal homepage; Online archive

Tropical Medicine & International Health is a peer-reviewed medical journal that covers malaria, HIV, tuberculosis, neglected infectious diseases, water and sanitation, public health, etc. The journal is published by Wiley.

== Abstracting and indexing ==
The journal is abstracted and indexed in:

- Abstracts in Anthropology (Sage)
- Abstracts on Hygiene & Communicable Diseases (CABI)
- Academic Search (EBSCO Publishing)
- Academic Search Alumni Edition (EBSCO Publishing)
- Academic Search Elite (EBSCO Publishing)
- Academic Search Premier (EBSCO Publishing)
- AgBiotech News & Information (CABI)
- AgBiotechNet (CABI)

According to the Journal Citation Reports, the journal has a 2021 impact factor of 3.918.
