= Honorary Aryan =

Nazi-era classification of people

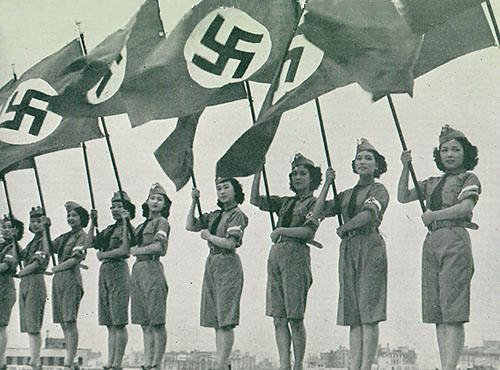
Japanese women doing a revue during a visit by the Hitler Youth and Nazi officials

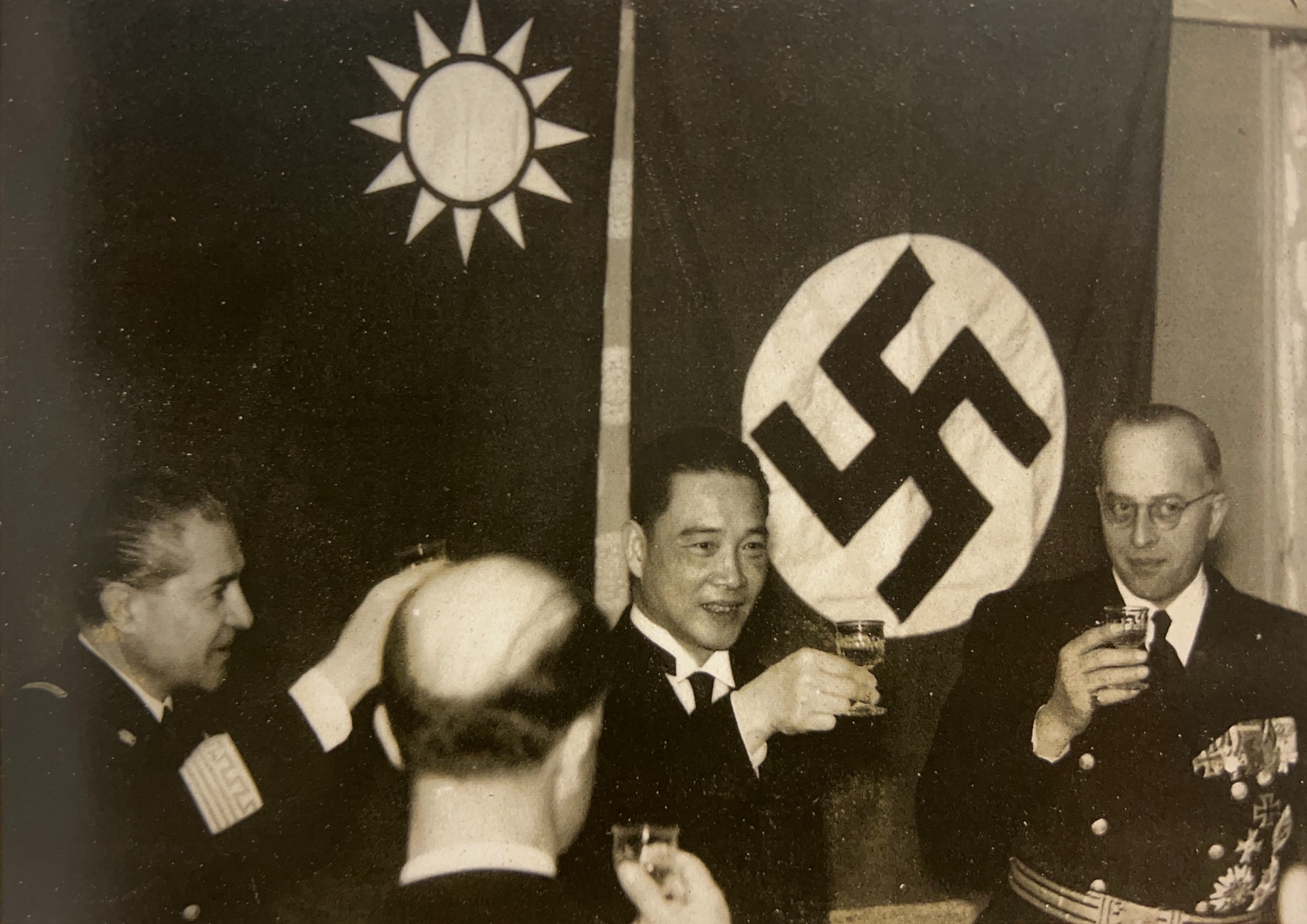
Wang Jingwei of the Japanese-puppet government in Nanking of China with German diplomats in 1941

Honorary Aryan (German: Ehrenarier) was a semi-official category and expression used in Nazi Germany and its territories to justify certain individuals who, according to the Nuremberg Laws, were not recognized as being of "German or related blood" (the Aryan race), but who were nonetheless spared persecution and granted equal rights, although they continued to be regarded as inferior to the Aryan race.

The bestowal of the Honorary Aryan status upon certain "non-Aryan" people or peoples was typically not well-documented, due to the semi-official nature of the category. Rationales included the services of those individuals or peoples who were deemed valuable to the German economy or war effort, political considerations, and propaganda value. Some Mischlinge (individuals of mixed European and non-Aryan ancestry) were granted Honorary Aryan status for their contributions to Germany and loyalty to the Nazi Party.

In the Independent State of Croatia, a Nazi client state, this term was used by Ante Pavelić to protect some Jews from persecution who had been useful to the state.

== Notable inclusions ==
=== Individuals ===
- Helmuth Wilberg, a Luftwaffe general and 1st-degree Mischling, (Note: A 1st-degree Mischling was someone classified as having two Jewish grandparents) was declared to be Aryan in 1935 by Hitler at the instigation of Hermann Göring.
- Amin al-Husseini, a Palestinian and the Mufti of the British Mandate of Palestine, was granted the status of Honorary Aryan by Hitler.
- Stephanie von Hohenlohe, a Jewish-Austrian princess by marriage and a spy for Nazi Germany, was declared an honorary Aryan by Heinrich Himmler.
- Emil Maurice, Hitler's first personal chauffeur and a very early member of the Nazi-Party, was member no. 2 of the SS, but ran afoul of Himmler's rules, which required SS men to have deep Aryan ancestry. Maurice's great-grandfather was Jewish, and Himmler (SS no. 168) considered him a security-risk. He tried to have him thrown out of the SS, but Hitler stood by his old friend and, in a secret letter dated 31 August 1935, required Himmler to allow Maurice and his brothers to remain in the organization as Honorary Aryans.
- Sophie Lehár (née Paschal), the wife of the composer Franz Lehár, had been Jewish before her conversion to Catholicism upon her marriage. Hitler enjoyed Lehár's music and the Nazis made some propaganda use of it. After Joseph Goebbels intervened on Lehár's behalf, Mrs. Lehár was given in 1938 the status of "Honorary Aryan" by marriage. At least one attempt was made to have her deported, but it was thwarted by her special status.
- Helene Mayer, a German-born fencer who had been forced to leave Germany in 1935 and resettle in the United States because she was Jewish, took part as an "Honorary Aryan" at the 1936 Olympics in Berlin, where she won the silver medal for Germany.
- Melitta Schenk Gräfin von Stauffenberg, an aeronautical engineer and test-pilot whose father had been born Jewish, was given Honorary Aryan status.

=== Demographics ===
- Hitler declared the Japanese people as Honorary Aryans, which granted them equal rights.
- There had been extensive cooperation between China and Germany from 1926, but this became untenable when the Second Sino-Japanese War broke out and Japan insisted on a cessation. Germany signed the Tripartite Pact, along with Japan and Italy, at the end of 1940. In July 1941, Hitler officially recognized Wang Jingwei's puppet government in Nanking. After the attack on Pearl Harbor, China formally joined the Allies and declared war on Nazi Germany on December 9, 1941. This, combined with the earlier restrictions placed on the Chinese by the Nazis, led to the persecution of the Chinese in Nazi Germany.

== See also ==
- Anti-Comintern Pact
- Eduard Bloch, who Hitler referred to as a noble Jew (German: Edeljude)
- Gunther Burstyn
- German–Japanese industrial co-operation before and during World War II
- German–Japanese relations
- Honorary whites
- Five Civilized Tribes
- Model minority
- Nazi racial theories
- Presidential exemption (Slovak State)
- Racial policy of Nazi Germany
- Tripartite Pact
