= Deepa Pullanikkatil =

Indian engineer

- Occupations: Engineer, sustainability and environmental manager
- Website: deepapullanikkatil.com

Deepa Pullanikkatil (born 1976) is an Indian engineer who has lived most of her life in Africa and worked in development and environmental management. She is currently the Commonwealth National Climate Finance Advisor for Fiji and previously worked in Malawi, Lesotho, South Africa, and Eswatini on projects to alleviate poverty and effectively manage ecosystems. She holds a bachelor's degree in civil engineering from Mahatma Gandhi University, a master's degree in environmental management from the University of the Free State, and a PhD in environmental science from North-West University in South Africa.

== Early life, education and family ==
Deepa Pullanikkatil was born in 1976, in Kannur, Kerala, India, to Roopalekha Sukumaran and Rajagopalan Pullanikkatil. Her mother was the daughter of the writer Tatapuram Sukumaran and her father was a civil engineer. Her parents moved with Pullanikkatil and her older brother Deepak to Dar es Salaam, Tanzania, in 1978. The family relocated to Lesotho in 1988. Pullanikkatil completed her bachelor's degree in civil engineering at Mahatma Gandhi University in 1998 and earned a post-graduate diploma in management from the Amrita Schools of Business in 2000.

== Career ==
Upon completing her studies, Pullanikkatil worked as a civil engineer on a hospital project in India and then on a water and sanitation project in rural Lesotho. In 2003, she was hired as a lecturer at Lerotholi Polytechnic, in Maseru, Lesotho, and worked her way up to the head of the department. Her research work at the time focused on the impact of climate change on Lesotho's subsistence farming workers. While teaching at Lerotholi, Pullanikkatil earned a master's degree from the University of the Free State in Bloemfontein, South Africa in 2009. The following year, she moved to Malawi and began working with the Rockefeller Foundation's programme, Leadership for Environment and Development (LEAD). The programme was designed to allow interdisciplinary collaboration between academics and other partners, encouraging them to work together on initiatives for sustainable development. Pullanikkatil's partners within LEAD were undertaken with the United Nations Development Programme (UNDP) and the United Nations Environment Programme (UNEP) to create a policy on climate change for the government of Malawi. During a presentation at the Woodrow Wilson International Center for Scholars in 2014, Pullanikkatil and Doreen Othero of the Lake Victoria Basin Commission, argued in favor of development efforts which coordinated environmental conservation projects with health and economic initiatives. They pointed out that goals to protect resources were often unreachable because of the failure to address the impact on the livelihoods and well-being of the communities concerned.

In 2015, Pullanikkatil was hired to carry out a needs assessment for the technology required to address climate change for the government of Swaziland (since 2018, Eswatini), in a project coordinated through the Global Environment Facility (GEF) and United Nations Environment Programme. She completed her PhD with the thesis, "Ecosystem Services Mapping of Likangala River Catchment, Southern Malawi" that year, at North-West University. The thesis explored the impact of human activity on water quality in the Likangala River, concluding that urban pollution from households, service facilities, and industries, as well as agricultural wastewater and fertiliser runoff, had increased contamination of the river. She began her post-doctoral fellowship at Rhodes University in 2016 and went on to complete a residency at the University of Glasgow in 2018. She worked at an NGO she founded, Abundance, and as a co-director for Sustainable Futures in Africa in Eswatini in 2019, before being hired in 2020 to manage the nationally determined contributions to reduce the greenhouse gas emissions for Eswatini. As the manager, she worked with the Common Market for Eastern and Southern Africa, the Commonwealth Foundation, the International Renewable Energy Agency, UNDP, UNEP, the UN Food and Agriculture Organization, and the World Resources Institute to coordinate the various programmes aimed to meet Eswatini's targets. In 2022, Eswatini was recognised at the United Nations Climate Change Conference with the "Best Urban Initiative of the Year Award". At the conference, Pullanikkatil was a member of a panel discussion, "Climate Plans for Energy Resilience in Africa and Small Island States". She stressed the importance of having a plan to address extreme weather which could damage energy infrastructure and of training women and youth in green technology both for assisting in development and reducing unemployment.

In 2023, Pullanikkatil became the Commonwealth National Climate Finance Advisor for Fiji, replacing Katherine Cooke. The position was created by the Commonwealth Climate Finance Access HUB was which formed in 2015 by Commonwealth leadership to assist government ministries and other organisations on climate and development initiatives. The partnership with Fiji and the Commonwealth hub provides funding to enable the local government to implement their strategic plans for sustainable growth and climate initiatives. Pullanikkatil is responsible for overseeing the completion of government programmes to provide electricity to rural areas, protect the environment, and implement an electric bus system.

== Selected works ==
Although Pullanikkatil's research focus is typically concerned with environmental sustainability and development, dealing with such topics as the impact of climate change, deforestation, mining, overfishing, and water availability, studies like her co-authored paper "Schistosomiasis Prevalence in Zomba, Southern Malawi", have pointed out links between health and population growth. In the paper, which evaluated the Lake Chilwa basin of Malawi, the researchers recognised that women were participating in the study at low rates. Discussions with the women concerned revealed that many of them had health problems related to snail fever. That revelation led to Pullanikkatil coordinating the first formal research project in the area focused on the parasitic flat worms, which cause the fever. The subsequent findings showed that nearly fifty per cent of the population was infected with the parasite and that the irrigation channels in use to combat water shortages due to climate change were increasing the levels of the parasite. This happened because the water in the irrigation ditches was fresher than the lake water. The study prompted a change in health policy and delivery of medication and the need to raise awareness of the problem. As a result, Pullanikkatil and her team gave radio broadcasts about the spread of the disease.

- Pullanikkatil, Deepa; Mubako, Stanley; Munthali, Misheck M. (2014). "Advancing Green Economy through Technology Transfer: Experiences from Malawi". Southern African Journal of Environmental Education. 30. Grahamstown, South Africa: Rhodes University for the Environmental Education Association of Southern Africa: 66–78. ISSN 2411-5959. OCLC 8580247776. Archived from the original on 2 March 2024.
- Pullanikkatil, Deepa; Mubako, Stanley; Phalira, Welton; Chiotha, Sosten; Luhanga, Michael (January 2014). "Schistosomiasis Prevalence in Zomba, Southern Malawi". African Geographical Review. 33 (1). Abingdon-on-Thames, Oxfordshire: Routledge for the Association of American Geographers African Specialty Group: 36–51. doi:10.1080/19376812.2013.861758. ISSN 2411-5959. OCLC 5527188415. S2CID 154713197.
- Pullanikkatil, Deepa (December 2014). Mapping of Provisioning Ecosystems Services in Likangala River Catchment, Zomba, Southern Malawi (PDF) (PhD). Mafikeng, South Africa: North-West University. Archived (PDF) from the original on 14 November 2023.
- Pullanikkatil, Deepa; Palamuleni, L.G.; Ruhiiga, T. M. (July 2015). "Impact of Land Use on Water Quality in the Likangala Catchment, Southern Malawi". African Journal of Aquatic Science. 40 (3). Abingdon-on-Thames, Oxfordshire: Routledge for the Southern African Society of Aquatic Scientists: 277–286. Bibcode:2015AfJAS..40..277P. doi:10.2989/16085914.2015.1077777. ISSN 1608-5914. OCLC 5997477805.
- Pullanikkatil, Deepa (February 2018). Technology Action Plan For Adaptation: Report III of Technology Needs Assessment (PDF) (Report). Mbabane, Swaziland: Kingdom of Swaziland. Archived (PDF) from the original on 10 August 2023.
- Pullanikkatil, Deepa; Shackleton, Charlie M., eds. (2019). Poverty Reduction through Non-Timber Forest Products: Personal Stories. Cham, Switzerland: Springer Nature. ISBN 978-3-319-75579-3.
- Pullanikkatil, Deepa; Hughes, Kerry, eds. (2022). Socio-Ecological Systems and Decoloniality: Convergence of Indigenous and Western Knowledge. Cham, Switzerland: Springer Nature. ISBN 978-3-031-15096-8.
