= 2015 SARU Community Cup =

South African rugby union competition

- Countries: South Africa
- Date: 21 February – 6 April 2015
- Champions: Durbanville-Bellville
- Runners-up: Rustenburg Impala
- Matches played: 52
- Tries scored: 399 (average 7.7 per match)
- Top point scorer: Raymond Olivier (85)
- Top try scorer: Wesley Flanagan / Chris Jordaan (7)

The 2015 SARU Community Cup (known as the 2015 Cell C Community Cup for sponsorship reasons) will be the third season of the SARU Community Cup competition. The qualification to the tournament will take place in 2014, while the competition proper will be contested in 2015. The tournament is the top competition for non-university rugby union clubs in South Africa.

== Competition ==
=== Qualification format ===
Qualification to the Community Cup will be determined via the club leagues of the fourteen provincial unions, plus Blue Bulls Limpopo. All university and other tertiary institutions are ineligible to participate in the Community Cup.

The highest-placed eligible team in each of the fifteen leagues will automatically qualify to the Community Cup (league rules determined if this is after the league stages or after the title-play-offs). As holders, Rustenburg Impala are guaranteed qualification to the Community Cup. In addition, post-season play-offs will be held between runners-up in the provincial leagues to take the number of participants up to twenty.

=== Finals format ===
The format of the Community Cup is the same as the Rugby World Cup. The teams will be divided into four pools, each containing five teams. They will then play four pool games, playing other teams in their respective pools once. Each team will play two home games and two away games.

The winner and runner-up of each pool will enter the play-off stage, to be held at a central venue over the Easter long weekend each year. The play-offs will consist of quarter finals, semi-finals and the final. The winner of each pool will meet the runner-up of a different pool in a quarter final. The winner of each quarter-final will go on to the semi-finals and the semi-final winners to the final, to be held at a neutral venue.

The losing semi-finalists will play each other in the Plate final. The losing quarter finalists will meet in the Bowl semi-final, the winners of which will play in the Bowl final, the losers playing in the Shield final.

== Qualification ==
The highest-placed non-university clubs in the 2014 season of each of the fourteen provincial unions' club leagues, as well as defending champions Rustenburg Impala and play-off winners will all qualify to the 2015 SARU Community Cup competition.

=== Blue Bulls ===
The log leader after the pool stage Second Round will qualify to the 2015 SARU Community Cup.

2014 Blue Bulls Carlton League First Round
Pos	Team	Pl	W	D	L	PF	PA	PD	BP	Pts	Comments
1	Pretoria Police	6	5	1	0	245	82	+163	4	26	
2	UP Tuks	6	5	0	1	292	93	+199	5	25	Ineligible
3	Oostelike Eagles	6	4	0	2	231	155	+76	2	18	
4	TUT Vikings	6	3	0	3	154	191	−37	3	15	Ineligible
5	Centurion	6	1	1	4	142	166	−24	5	11	
6	Naka Bulls	6	1	0	5	92	277	−185	3	5	
7	Pretoria Harlequins	6	1	0	5	91	283	−192	0	3	
Final standings. Silver Valke withdrew. The top four teams qualified to the Second Round.

2014 Blue Bulls Carlton League Second Round
Pos	Team	Pl	W	D	L	PF	PA	PD	BP	Pts	Comments
1	UP Tuks	3	3	0	0	165	0	+165	3	15	Ineligible
2	Pretoria Police	3	2	0	1	56	89	−33	1	9	Qualified
3	Oostelike Eagles	3	1	0	2	61	73	−12	1	5	Play-offs
4	TUT Vikings	3	0	0	3	14	134	−120	0	0	Ineligible
Final standings. Pretoria Police qualified to the 2015 SARU Community Cup as the highest-placed non-university team. Oostelike Eagles qualified to the play-offs.

=== Blue Bulls Limpopo ===
The play-off final winner will qualify to the 2015 SARU Community Cup.

2014 Blue Bulls Limpopo Boet Fick Senior League
Pos	Team	Pl	W	D	L	PF	PA	PD	BP	Pts	Comments
1	Noordelikes	6	5	0	1	295	80	+215	6	26	Qualified
2	Letaba	6	5	0	1	241	85	+156	6	26	
3	Musina	6	2	0	4	170	225	−55	2	10	
4	Pietersburg	6	0	0	6	44	360	−316	1	1	
2014 Blue Bulls Limpopo Waterberg League
Pos	Team	Pl	W	D	L	PF	PA	PD	BP	Pts	Comments
1	Potgietersrus	6	6	0	0	264	89	+175	6	30	Play-offs
2	Northam	6	4	0	2	211	86	+125	5	21	
3	Nylstroom	6	4	0	2	193	100	+93	3	19	
4	Thabazimbi	6	3	0	3	140	131	+9	2	14	
5	Mogol	6	2	0	4	85	162	−77	1	9	
6	Vaalwater	6	2	0	4	92	171	−79	1	9	
7	Kwaggas	6	0	0	6	35	281	−246	0	0	
Final standings. Noordelikes qualified to the 2015 SARU Community Cup as the play-off winner. Potgietersrus qualified to the play-offs.

==== Boet Fick League ====
===== Semi-final =====
27 June 2014	Letaba	28–7	Musina

===== Final =====
5 July 2014	Noordelikes	46–17	Letaba

==== Waterberg League ====
===== Semi-final =====
18 July 2014	Northam	28–0	Nylstroom

===== Final =====
1 August 2014	Potgietersrus	24–18	Northam

==== Play-off ====
9 August 2014	Noordelikes	31–25	Potgietersrus

14 August 2014	Potgietersrus	10–32	Noordelikes

=== Boland ===
The log leader after the pool stage will qualify to the 2015 SARU Community Cup.

2014 Boland Premier League
Pos	Team	Pl	W	D	L	PF	PA	PD	BP	Pts	Comments
1	Villagers Worcester	20	16	1	3	581	281	+300	17	83	Qualified
2	Wesbank	20	13	3	4	662	323	+339	14	72	Play-offs
3	Never Despair	20	9	4	7	508	474	+34	11	55	Newly-promoted
4	Saldanha	20	11	1	8	506	476	+30	9	55	
5	Vredenburg	19	9	3	7	440	484	−44	11	53	
6	Hawston	20	8	2	10	637	564	+73	16	52	
7	Delicious	20	9	2	9	426	495	−69	10	50	Newly-promoted
8	Roses United	20	7	4	9	465	464	+1	12	48	
9	Robertson	19	8	0	11	519	594	−75	13	45	
10	Ceres	19	6	1	12	430	593	−163	12	38	
11	Wellington	19	1	1	17	243	669	−426	5	11	
Updated 25 October 2014. Villagers Worcester qualified to the 2015 SARU Community Cup as the highest-placed team. Wesbank qualified to the play-offs.

=== Border ===
The play-off final winner will qualify to the 2015 SARU Community Cup.

2014 Border Super League
Pos	Team	Pl	W	D	L	PF	PA	PD	BP	Pts	Comments
1	Old Selbornians	11	10	0	1	416	60	+356	8	48	Qualified
2	East London Police	11	10	0	1	274	118	+156	5	45	Play-offs
3	UFH Blues	11	8	0	3	343	80	+263	9	41	Ineligible
4	Buffalo	11	6	1	4	271	214	+57	9	35	
5	Swallows	11	6	0	5	215	185	+30	4	28	
6	Breakers	10	6	0	4	253	256	−3	4	28	
7	WSU All Blacks	11	5	0	6	234	237	−3	7	27	Ineligible
8	Berlin Tigers	10	5	0	5	210	216	−6	6	26	
9	Cambridge	11	3	1	7	241	363	−122	6	20	
10	Old Collegians	11	2	1	8	163	411	−248	6	16	
11	Winter Rose	11	2	0	9	144	309	−165	4	12	
12	Ready Blues	11	0	1	10	65	380	−315	1	3	Relegated
Final standings. Old Selbornians qualified to the 2015 SARU Community Cup as the highest-placed non-university team. East London Police qualified to the play-offs.

=== Eastern Province ===
The log leader after the pool stage will qualify to the 2015 SARU Community Cup.

2014 Eastern Province Grand Challenge
Pos	Team	Pl	W	D	L	PF	PA	PD	BP	Pts	Comments
1	Despatch	11	9	2	0	521	161	+360	9	49	Qualified
2	NMMU Madibaz	11	8	1	2	380	231	+149	10	44	Ineligible
3	Port Elizabeth Police	11	9	0	2	329	160	+169	7	43	Play-offs
4	Gardens	11	8	0	3	276	247	+29	7	39	
5	Progress	11	6	0	5	246	202	+44	7	31	
6	Crusaders	11	6	0	5	211	271	−60	4	28	
7	Kruisfontein	11	3	1	7	268	374	−106	10	24	
8	Spring Rose	11	4	1	6	231	269	−38	5	23	
9	Grahamstown Brumbies	11	4	0	7	240	345	−105	7	23	
10	African Bombers	11	2	1	8	233	276	−43	10	20	
11	Park	11	2	0	9	196	435	−239	5	13	
12	Harlequins	11	2	0	9	164	324	−160	4	12	
Final standings. Despatch qualified to the 2015 SARU Community Cup as the highest-placed non-university team. Port Elizabeth Police qualified to the play-offs.

=== Free State ===
The log leader after the pool stage will qualify to the 2015 SARU Community Cup.

2014 Free State First League
Pos	Team	Pl	W	D	L	PF	PA	PD	BP	Pts	Comments
1	UFS Shimlas	6	6	0	0	322	61	+261	5	29	Ineligible
2	UFS Under-23	6	5	0	1	257	60	+177	4	24	Newly-promoted, Ineligible
3	Bloemfontein Crusaders	6	4	0	2	168	206	−38	3	19	Qualified
4	UFS Irawas	6	3	0	3	279	147	+132	5	17	Ineligible
5	CUT Ixias	6	2	0	4	216	150	+66	4	12	Ineligible
6	Bloemfontein Police	6	1	0	5	122	367	−245	2	6	Play-offs
7	Bloemfontein Collegians	6	0	0	6	59	412	−353	2	2	Newly-promoted, Relegated
Final standings. Bloemfontein Crusaders qualified to the 2015 SARU Community Cup as the highest-placed non-university team. Bloemfontein Police qualified to the play-offs.

==== Town Challenge Cup ====
The Town Challenge Cup is the title play-off matches.

===== Semi-final =====
31 May 2014	UFS Under-23	31–22	Bloemfontein Crusaders	Shimla Park, Bloemfontein

===== Final =====
7 June 2014	UFS Shimlas	33–29	UFS Under-23	Shimla Park, Bloemfontein

==== Rowan Cup ====
The Rowan Cup is the play-off for fourth place.

===== Final =====
7 June 2014	UFS Irawas	59–25	Bloemfontein Police	Shimla Park, Bloemfontein

=== Golden Lions ===
The log leader after the pool stage will qualify to the 2015 SARU Community Cup.

2014 Golden Lions Pirates Grand Challenge
Pos	Team	Pl	W	D	L	PF	PA	PD	BP	Pts	Comments
1	Raiders	9	8	0	1	291	137	+154	7	39	Qualified
2	Wanderers	9	7	0	2	270	160	+110	9	37	Play-offs
3	UJ	9	8	0	1	255	98	+157	3	35	Ineligible
4	Roodepoort	9	6	0	3	292	171	+121	8	32	
5	Wits	9	4	1	3	221	151	+70	6	24	Ineligible
6	Pirates	9	4	0	5	223	184	+39	6	22	
7	Randfontein	9	3	1	5	145	221	−76	1	15	
8	Union	9	2	0	6	134	202	−68	5	13	
9	Alberton	9	1	0	8	130	385	−255	2	6	
10	Diggers	9	0	0	9	0	252	−252	0	−5	
Final standings. Raiders qualified to the 2015 SARU Community Cup as the highest-placed non-university team. Wanderers qualified to the play-offs.

=== Griffons ===
The play-off final winner will qualify to the 2015 SARU Community Cup.

2014 Griffons 1st League
Pos	Team	Pl	W	D	L	PF	PA	PD	BP	Pts	Comments
1	Welkom Rovers	8	8	0	0	543	61	+482	7	39	Qualified
2	Kroonstad	7	5	0	2	402	105	+297	5	25	Play-offs
3	Henneman	7	4	0	3	251	166	+85	4	20	
4	Welkom	8	2	0	6	192	304	−112	2	10	
5	Welkom Police	8	0	0	8	35	787	−752	0	0	Newly-promoted
Final standings. Welkom Rovers qualified to the 2015 SARU Community Cup as the play-off winner. Kroonstad qualified to the play-offs.

==== Final ====
27 June 2014	Welkom Rovers	23–18	Kroonstad	Rovers Rugby Club, Welkom

=== Griquas ===
The log leader after the pool stage will qualify to the 2015 SARU Community Cup.

2014 Griquas Super League
Pos	Team	Pl	W	D	L	PF	PA	PD	BP	Pts	Comments
1	Sishen	6	6	0	0	331	48	+283	5	29	Qualified
2	Upington Dorp	6	5	0	1	172	118	+54	4	24	Play-offs
3	Kimberley Police	6	4	0	2	151	153	−2	3	19	
4	Kuruman	6	2	0	4	171	177	−6	5	13	
5	Port Nolloth	6	2	0	4	96	208	−112	2	10	Newly-promoted
5	Postmasburg	6	1	0	5	166	201	−35	4	8	
6	Upington United	6	1	0	5	99	281	−182	2	6	
Final standings. Sishen qualified to the 2015 SARU Community Cup as the highest-placed team. Upington Dorp qualified to the play-offs.

=== KwaZulu-Natal ===
The log leader after the pool stage will qualify to the 2015 SARU Community Cup.

2014 KwaZulu-Natal Moor Cup
Pos	Team	Pl	W	D	L	PF	PA	PD	BP	Pts	Comments
1	Durban Collegians	14	14	0	0	537	153	+384	10	66	Qualified
2	College Rovers	14	11	0	3	508	184	+324	13	57	Play-offs
3	Durban Crusaders	14	10	0	4	372	248	+124	7	47	
4	Varsity College	14	8	0	6	386	257	+129	8	40	
5	Amanzimtoti	14	6	0	8	334	271	+63	8	32	Newly-promoted
6	Pietermaritzburg Collegians	14	5	0	9	241	373	−132	6	26	
7	UKZN Impi	14	2	0	12	240	562	−322	5	13	Ineligible
8	Zululand Rhinos	14	0	0	14	145	715	−570	2	2	
Final standings. Durban Collegians qualified to the 2015 SARU Community Cup as the highest-placed non-university team. College Rovers qualified to the play-offs.

=== Leopards ===
Rustenburg Impala will qualify as the defending champions. Vaal Reefs will take part in the play-offs.

Rustenburg Impala and NWU Pukke participate in the Golden Lions Pirates Grand Challenge, while Vaal Reefs compete in the Valke Peregrine League.

=== Mpumalanga ===
The play-off final winner will qualify to the 2015 SARU Community Cup.

2014 Mpumalanga Super League – Highveld
Pos	Team	Pl	W	D	L	PF	PA	PD	BP	Pts	Comments
1	Witbank Ferros	3	3	0	0	75	62	+13	1	22	Qualified
2	Middelburg	3	2	0	1	83	40	+43	2	18	
3	Sasol	3	1	0	2	94	50	+44	3	15	Play-offs
4	Loskop	3	0	0	3	31	131	−100	1	7	Newly-promoted
2014 Mpumalanga Super League – Lowveld
1	White River	8	8	0	0	279	88	+191	8	40	
2	Nelspruit	8	6	0	2	268	154	+114	5	29	
3	Malelane	8	4	0	4	183	163	+20	5	21	
4	Barberton	8	2	0	6	136	246	−110	3	11	Newly-promoted
5	Lydenburg Rooikatte	8	0	0	8	67	282	−215	1	1	
Final standings. Witbank Ferros qualified to the 2015 SARU Community Cup as the play-off winner. Sasol qualified to the play-offs.

==== Semi-finals ====
26 July 2014	White River	11–45	Sasol

26 July 2014	Witbank Ferros	43–24	Middelburg

==== Final ====
2 August 2014	Sasol	11–29	Witbank Ferros	Puma Stadium, Witbank

=== South Western Districts ===
The play-off final winner will qualify to the 2015 SARU Community Cup.

2014 South Western Districts Premier League
Pos	Team	Pl	W	D	L	PF	PA	PD	BP	Pts	Comments
1	Evergreens	22	19	2	1	693	311	+382	14	94	Qualified
2	Mossel Bay Barbarians	22	18	2	2	645	238	+407	12	88	Play-offs
3	Progress	22	18	0	4	603	304	+299	14	86	
4	Groot-Brakrivier	22	15	0	7	615	425	+190	15	75	
5	Bridgton	22	12	1	9	610	432	+178	13	63	
6	Crusaders	22	11	0	11	475	505	−30	11	55	
7	Bonnievale United	22	11	0	11	443	494	−51	10	54	To Boland Rugby Union
8	Silver Stars	21	6	1	14	313	466	−153	9	35	
9	Uniondale	22	6	0	16	457	758	−301	10	34	
10	Blanco	22	5	0	17	404	570	−166	13	33	
11	Mossel Bay	21	4	0	17	317	857	−540	5	21	Newly-promoted
12	All Blacks	22	3	0	19	285	500	−215	7	19	Suspended, Relegated
Final standings. Evergreens qualified to the 2015 SARU Community Cup as the play-off winner. Mossel Bay Barbarians qualified to the play-offs. All Blacks were suspended until the end of 2015 following an incident in their match against Bridgton during which the referee was assaulted. Their remaining matches were all awarded as 20–0 bonus-point victories to their opponents.

==== Semi-finals ====
11 October 2014	Evergreens	31–30	Groot-Brakrivier	Pacaltsdorp

11 October 2014	Mossel Bay Barbarians	12–10	Progress	D'Almeida Stadium, Mossel Bay

==== Final ====
18 October 2014	Evergreens	22–16	Mossel Bay Barbarians	Outeniqua Park, George

=== Valke ===
The play-off final winner will qualify to the 2015 SARU Community Cup.

2014 Valke Peregrine League
Pos	Team	Pl	W	D	L	PF	PA	PD	BP	Pts	Comments
1	Springs	10	10	0	0	385	165	+220	7	47	Qualified
2	Brakpan	10	7	0	3	407	150	+257	10	38	Play-offs
3	Boksburg	10	6	0	4	316	305	+11	7	31	
4	Vaal Reefs	10	3	0	7	244	277	−33	6	18	From Leopards, Ineligible
5	Vereeniging	10	3	0	7	206	323	-117	6	18	Newly-promoted
6	NWU Vaal Triangle	10	1	0	9	72	410	−338	3	7	Ineligible
Final standings. Springs qualified to the 2015 SARU Community Cup as the highest-placed non-university team. Brakpan qualified to the play-offs.

=== Western Province ===
The log leader after the pool stage qualified to the 2015 SARU Community Cup.

2014 Western Province Super League A
Pos	Team	Pl	W	D	L	PF	PA	PD	BP	Pts	Comments
1	Maties	14	14	0	0	560	181	+379	9	65	Ineligible
2	UCT Ikey Tigers	14	13	0	1	632	195	+437	12	64	Ineligible
3	Hamiltons	14	11	0	3	496	263	+233	13	57	Qualified
4	Durbanville-Bellville	14	11	0	3	504	198	+306	11	55	Play-offs
5	False Bay	14	10	0	4	491	261	+230	10	50	
6	Victorians	14	8	1	5	443	384	+59	12	46	Ineligible
7	Belhar	14	7	2	5	322	324	−2	5	37	
8	Helderberg	14	6	1	7	333	360	−27	8	34	
9	SK Walmers	14	6	2	6	260	413	−153	3	31	
10	UWC	14	4	0	10	278	373	−95	10	26	Newly-promoted, Ineligible
11	Primrose	14	3	2	9	277	469	−192	6	22	Newly-promoted
12	Tygerberg	14	3	0	11	318	476	−158	7	19	
13	Kuils River	14	3	0	11	284	486	−202	4	16	Newly-promoted, Relegated
14	Bellville	14	2	0	12	207	610	−403	5	13	Relegated
15	NNK	14	0	0	14	222	634	−412	5	5	Newly-promoted, Relegated
Final standings. Hamiltons qualified to the 2015 SARU Community Cup as the highest-placed non-university team. Durbanville-Bellville qualified to the play-offs.

=== Play-offs ===
The runners-up in the provincial leagues would qualify to the play-offs, with the four Round Three winners also qualifying to the SARU Community Cup, as well as the winner of the repechage.

==== Round one ====
6 September 2014	Vaal Reefs	19–30	Brakpan	Olën Park, Potchefstroom

- Sasol progressed after Potgietersrus withdrew.

==== Round two ====
23 August 2014	Bloemfontein Police	31–52	Upington Dorp	Griqua Park, Kimberley

13 September 2014	Oostelike Eagles	26–33	Sasol	Secunda

13 September 2014	Wanderers	45–39	Brakpan	Wits Rugby Stadium, Johannesburg

27 September 2014	East London Police	24–35	Port Elizabeth Police	Central Grounds, Uitenhage

- College Rovers progressed after Kroonstad withdrew.

==== Round three ====
6 September 2014	College Rovers	62–17	Upington Dorp	Kings Park Stadium, Durban

20 September 2014	Wanderers	35–20	Sasol	Loftus Versfeld, Pretoria

22 October 2014	Wesbank	29–28	Durbanville-Bellville	Faure Street Stadium, Paarl

25 October 2014	Mossel Bay Barbarians	14–71	Port Elizabeth Police	Kemsley Park, Port Elizabeth

- The Round Three winners – College Rovers, Port Elizabeth Police, Wanderers and Wesbank – qualified for the 2015 SARU Community Cup.
- The Round Three losers – Durbanville-Bellville, Mossel Bay Barbarians, Sasol and Upington Dorp – qualified to the Repechage Semi-finals.

==== Repechage Semi-finals ====
18 October 2014	Upington Dorp	37–17	Sasol	Die Eiland, Upington

- Durbanville-Bellville progressed after Mossel Bay Barbarians withdrew.

==== Repechage Final ====
8 November 2014	Upington Dorp	26–82	Durbanville-Bellville	Die Eiland, Upington

== Teams ==
The following teams qualified for the 2015 SARU Community Cup:

Location of teams in the 2015 SARU Community Cup
Pool A
Pool B
Pool C
Pool D
For Gauteng and Western Cape teams, see maps below.
Location of Gauteng-based teams in the 2015 SARU Community Cup
Pool A
Pool B
Pool C
Location of Western Cape-based teams in the 2015 SARU Community Cup
Pool A
Pool C
Pool D

=== Team listing ===
Team	Sponsored Name	Union	Entry Type
Bloemfontein Crusaders	Berlesell Bloemfontein Crusaders	Free State	Qualified
College Rovers	Jonsson College Rovers	KwaZulu-Natal	Play-offs
Despatch	GAP Management Despatch	Eastern Province	Qualified
Durban Collegians	SA Home Loans Durban Collegians	KwaZulu-Natal	Qualified
Durbanville-Bellville	Durbanville-Bellville	Western Province	Play-offs
Evergreens	Evergreens	South Western Districts	Qualified
Hamiltons	Hamiltons	Western Province	Qualified
Noordelikes	BB Truck & Tractor Noordelikes	Blue Bulls Limpopo	Qualified
Old Selbornians	Kempston Old Selbornians	Border	Qualified
Port Elizabeth Police	Don's Pawn Shop Port Elizabeth Police	Eastern Province	Play-offs
Pretoria Police	Pretoria Police	Blue Bulls	Qualified
Raiders	Raiders	Golden Lions	Qualified
Rustenburg Impala	Rustenburg Impala	Leopards	Holders
Sishen	Aveng Moolmans Sishen	Griquas	Qualified
Springs	East Rand Cranes Springs	Valke	Qualified
Villagers Worcester	One Logix United Bulk Villagers Worcester	Boland	Qualified
Wanderers	Vaseline Wanderers	Golden Lions	Play-offs
Welkom Rovers	J&F Reclaiming Welkom Rovers	Griffons	Qualified
Wesbank	Wesbank	Boland	Play-offs
Witbank Ferros	Shumba Ferro's	Mpumalanga	Qualified

== Pool Stages ==
The 20 teams were drawn in the following four pools:

=== Pool A ===
==== Log ====
2015 SARU Community Cup Pool A Log
Pos	Team	Pl	W	D	L	PF	PA	PD	TF	TA	TB	LB	Pts
1	Durbanville-Bellville	4	3	0	1	154	86	+68	21	12	2	0	14
2	Rustenburg Impala	4	3	0	1	152	75	+77	21	9	2	0	14
3	Old Selbornians	4	2	0	2	71	67	+4	10	8	0	2	10
4	Port Elizabeth Police	4	1	0	3	94	112	−18	13	15	1	1	6
5	Springs	4	1	0	3	61	192	−131	8	29	0	0	4
* Legend: Pos = Position, Pl = Played, W = Won, D = Drawn, L = Lost, PF = Points for, PA = Points against, PD = Points difference, TF = Tries for, TA = Tries against, TB = Try bonus points, LB = Losing bonus points, Pts = Log points Durbanville-Bellville and Rustenburg Impala qualified for the finals. Points breakdown: *4 points for a win *2 points for a draw *1 bonus point for a loss by seven points or less *1 bonus point for scoring four or more tries in a match

==== Fixtures and results ====
===== Round one =====
21 February 2015	Old Selbornians	22–14	Durbanville-Bellville	Kempston Park, East London
16:00	Try: Saneliso Ngoma 22'; Bradley Birkholtz 43'; Jannie Rossouw 62'; Con: Dale Sabbagh 23', 44' (2/3); Pen: Dale Sabbagh 27' (1/3)	Scoreboard	Try: Angus Cleophas 10'; Garth April 20'; Con: Dane Sherratt 11', 21' (2/2); Pen: Roderick Moses (0/1); Cards: Marnus Hugo (yellow card) 55' to 65'	Attendance: 1,000; Referee: Fernando Uithaler

21 February 2015	Rustenburg Impala	36–22	Port Elizabeth Police	Rustenburg Impala Rugby Club, Rustenburg
16:00	Try: Wilco de Wet 44'; Willie Kok 51'; Leon du Plessis 56'; Morné Jooste 62', 72'; Con: Wilco de Wet 45', 52', 57', 63' (4/5); Pen: Wilco de Wet 79' (1/2)	Scoreboard	Try: Juan Smit 21'; Kyle Verwey 46'; Fabian Juries 75'; Con: Juan Smit 22' (1/2); Kevin Plaatjies 76' (1/1); Pen: Juan Smit 30' (1/1); Cards: Elton Loxton (yellow card) 55' to 65'	Attendance: 350; Referee: Oregopotse Rametsi

Bye/s: Springs

===== Round two =====
28 February 2015	Durbanville-Bellville	73–19	Springs	Durbanville-Bellville Rugby Club
16:00	Try: Rohan Kitshoff 5', 18', 34'; Alconray Botha 23'; Tiaan Radyn 26'; Jason Kriel 30'; Garth April 36'; Ashton Constant 43', 55'; Brendon April 45', 52'; Con: Raymond Olivier 6', 19', 27', 31', 35', 37', 44', 53', 56' (9/11)	Scoreboard	Try: Pierre Foord 64'; Johan Zondagh 79'; Strachen Nortjé 80'; Con: Kazlo Holtzhausen 65', 80' (2/3); Cards: Kazlo Holtzhausen (yellow card) 30' to 40'	Attendance: 800; Referee: Cwengile Jadezweni

28 February 2015	Port Elizabeth Police	15–8	Old Selbornians	Kemsley Park, Port Elizabeth
16:00	Try: Alwyn Jordaan 43'; Juan Smit 67'; Con: Juan Smit 68' (1/2); Pen: Juan Smit 17' (1/2); Cards: Kyle Verwey (yellow card) 46' to 56'; Quinton Haasbroek (yellow card) 72'	Scoreboard	Try: Roy Bursey 48'; Con: Dale Sabbagh (0/1); Pen: Dale Sabbagh 79' (1/1); Cards: Roy Bursey (yellow card) 64' to 74'	Attendance: 400; Referee: Sindile Ngcese

Bye/s: Rustenburg Impala

===== Round three =====
7 March 2015	Springs	25–22	Port Elizabeth Police	Springs Rugby Club
16:00	Try: Riaan Botha 12'; Anton van Deventer 65'; Martiens du Plessis 82'; Con: Johan Zondagh 66', 83' (2/3); Pen: Johan Zondagh 25', 44' (2/2); Cards: Corné Uys (yellow card) 28' to 38'	Scoreboard	Try: Elton Loxton 4'; Daantjie Vosloo 23'; Jeremy Sebia 51'; Con: Juan Smit 24', 52' (2/3); Pen: Juan Smit 9' (1/2); Cards: Jeremy Sebia (yellow card) 28' to 38'	Referee: Ruaan du Preez

7 March 2015	Old Selbornians	22–28	Rustenburg Impala	Kempston Park, East London
16:00	Try: Billy Dutton 14'; Roy Bursey 60'; Leon Mauer 65'; Con: Dale Sabbagh 15' (1/1); Leon Mauer 61' (1/2); Pen: Dale Sabbagh 9' (1/2)	Scoreboard	Try: Dumisani Matyeshana 28', 32'; Tiaan Nel 56'; Con: Wilco de Wet 29', 57' (2/3); Pen: Wilco de Wet 5', 51', 71' (3/4); Cards: Hendrik Huyser (yellow card) 64'	Referee: Tahla Ntshakaza

Bye/s: Durbanville-Bellville

===== Round four =====
14 March 2015	Rustenburg Impala	78–7	Springs	Rustenburg Impala Rugby Club, Rustenburg
16:00	Try: Gysbert van Wyk 6', 19'; Hendrik Huyser 17'; Morné Jooste 24', 38'; Dumisani Matyeshana 26'; Victor Joubert 29'; Cecil Dumond 32'; Morné Basson 56'; Willie Kok 59'; Stefan Kruger 65'; Joe Seerane 68'; Con: Wilco de Wet 7', 18', 20', 25', 27' (5/7); Cecil Dumond 39' (1/1); Willie Kok 57', 60', 69' (3/4)	Scoreboard	Try: Steven Boshoff 42'; Con: Johan Zondagh 43' (1/1)	Referee: Pieter Maritz

14 March 2015	Port Elizabeth Police	35–43	Durbanville-Bellville	Nelson Mandela Bay Stadium, Port Elizabeth
14:30	Try: Frans Gerber 19'; Jeremy Sebia 38', 54'; Lyle Walters 44'; Fabian Juries 77'; Con: Juan Smit 20', 39', 45', 55', 78' (5/5)	Scoreboard	Try: Tiaan Radyn 2', 17'; Raymond Olivier 7', 57'; Brendon April 33'; Garth April 41'; Con: Raymond Olivier 3', 18', 34', 42', 58' (5/6); Pen: Raymond Olivier 80' (1/1); Cards: Douw Wessels (yellow card) 55' to 65'	Referee: Fernando Uithaler

Bye/s: Old Selbornians

===== Round five =====
21 March 2015	Durbanville-Bellville	24–10	Rustenburg Impala	Durbanville-Bellville Rugby Club
16:00	Try: Karl Liebenberg 13'; Rohan Kitshoff 59'; Con: Raymond Olivier 14' (1/2); Pen: Raymond Olivier 18', 42', 67', 79' (4/5); Cards: Karl Liebenberg (yellow card) 32' to 46'	Scoreboard	Try: Aubrey McDonald 65'; Con: Willie Kok 66' (1/1); Pen: Wilco de Wet 26' (1/3)	Referee: AJ Jacobs

21 March 2015	Springs	10–19	Old Selbornians	Springs Rugby Club
16:00	Try: Pierre Foord 75'; Con: Johan Zondagh 76' (1/1); Pen: Johan Zondagh 14' (1/1); Dawie van Nieuwenhuizen (0/1)	Scoreboard	Try: Curtis Kleinhans 27', 48'; Roy Bursey 69'; Con: Leon Mauer 28', 49' (2/3); Cards: MJ le Marquand (yellow card) 12' to 22'; Craig Green (yellow card) 38'	Referee: Johre Botha

Bye/s: Port Elizabeth Police

=== Pool B ===
==== Log ====
2015 SARU Community Cup Pool B Log
Pos	Team	Pl	W	D	L	PF	PA	PD	TF	TA	TB	LB	Pts
1	Pretoria Police	4	4	0	0	145	93	+52	20	12	3	0	19
2	College Rovers	4	3	0	1	149	56	+93	19	5	2	1	15
3	Raiders	4	2	0	2	116	122	−6	15	16	2	0	10
4	Bloemfontein Crusaders	4	1	0	3	73	125	−52	8	18	1	2	7
5	Noordelikes	4	0	0	4	81	168	−87	12	23	2	1	3
* Legend: Pos = Position, Pl = Played, W = Won, D = Drawn, L = Lost, PF = Points for, PA = Points against, PD = Points difference, TF = Tries for, TA = Tries against, TB = Try bonus points, LB = Losing bonus points, Pts = Log points Pretoria Police and College Rovers qualified for the finals. Points breakdown: *4 points for a win *2 points for a draw *1 bonus point for a loss by seven points or less *1 bonus point for scoring four or more tries in a match

==== Fixtures and results ====
===== Round one =====
21 February 2015	Bloemfontein Crusaders	16–20	Raiders	Clive Solomon Stadium, Heidedal
16:00	Try: Blaine Tlhapane 8'; Con: Griffin Colby 9' (1/1); Pen: Griffin Colby 16', 30', 39' (3/5); Drop: Jason Horne (0/1); Cards: Daniel Caku-Caku (yellow card) 27' to 39'; Johannes Van Niekerk (yellow card) 75'	Scoreboard	Try: Chris Juries 34'; Gardener Nechironga 55'; Con: Arno Coetzee 35', 56' (2/2); Pen: Arno Coetzee 2', 22' (2/4); Drop: Arno Coetzee (0/1); Cards: Lisevheli Gaven Nesindande (yellow card) 62' to 72'	Attendance: 500; Referee: Jaco Kotze

21 February 2015	Pretoria Police	40–17	Noordelikes	Police Fields, Pretoria
16:00	Try: Jerry Sefoko 12'; Nico Luus 32'; Rayno Wasserman 36'; Birtie Powell 51'; Heinrich Rademeyer 68', 78'; Con: Dillon Laubscher 13', 33', 37', 69', 79' (5/6); Cards: Natal de Sousa (yellow card) 39' to 49'	Scoreboard	Try: Sias van Wyk 5'; Leslie Venton 62'; Con: Arno Venter 6' (1/1); JP Vermeulen 63' (1/1); Pen: Arno Venter (0/2); Alwyn Olivier 40' (1/2); JP Vermeulen (0/1); Cards: Malope Masemola (yellow card) 11' to 21'	Attendance: 350; Referee: Renier Vermeulen

Bye/s: College Rovers

===== Round two =====
28 February 2015	College Rovers	53–15	Noordelikes	KP10, Kings Park, Durban
14:15	Try: Chris Micklewood 23'; Jongi Nokwe 30', 73'; Sangoni Mxoli 35'; Chris Jordaan 40'; Matt Phillips 66'; Chesney Botha 75'; Con: Chris Micklewood 24', 31', 36', 40', 67', 76' (6/7); Pen: Chris Micklewood 14', 21' (2/2); Cards: Cameron Holenstein (yellow card) 66' to 76'	Scoreboard	Try: Scheepers Lubbe 56'; Gert van der Merwe 77'; Con: Zander Byleveldt 78' (1/2); Pen: Zander Byleveldt 45' (1/1)	Referee: Archie Sehlako

28 February 2015	Bloemfontein Crusaders	26–31	Pretoria Police	Clive Solomon Stadium, Heidedal
16:00	Try: Algernon Andries 2', 41'; Enver Brandt 58'; Alvin Brandt 71'; Con: Griffin Colby 42', 59', 72' (3/4); Pen: Jason Horne (0/1); Griffin Colby (0/1)	Scoreboard	Try: Ivan Venter 12'; Vince Gwavu 53'; Imille Keyser 78'; Strepies van Loo 80'; Con: Strepies van Loo 13' (1/4); Pen: Strepies van Loo 4', 16', 26' (3/6)	Attendance: 800; Referee: AJ Jacobs

Bye/s: Raiders

===== Round three =====
7 March 2015	Pretoria Police	20–19	College Rovers	Police Fields, Pretoria
16:00	Try: Heinrich Rademeyer 22'; Hannes Ludik 56'; Con: Dillon Laubscher 23', 57' (2/2); Pen: Dillon Laubscher 79' (1/3); Drop: Dillon Laubscher 60' (1/1); Cards: Imille Keyser (yellow card) 63' to 73'	Scoreboard	Try: Matt Phillips 3'; Con: Chris Micklewood 4' (1/1); Pen: Chris Micklewood 7', 26', 35', 65' (4/5); Cards: André Greyvenstein (yellow card) 21' to 31'; Wade Elliot (yellow card) 63' to 73'	Referee: Stephan Geldenhuys

7 March 2015	Noordelikes	27–50	Raiders	Noordelikes Rugby Club, Polokwane
16:00	Try: Scheepers Lubbe 13'; Alwyn Olivier 16'; Dustin Hoffmann 52'; Gert van der Merwe 74'; Con: Zander Byleveldt 53' (1/3); Alwyn Olivier 75' (1/1); Pen: Zander Byleveldt 4' (1/1)	Scoreboard	Try: Chris Juries 2', 33'; Chris Nqubuli 21'; Marceau Alberts 36', 62'; Tshepo Mooki 67', 79'; Con: Arno Coetzee 3', 22', 34', 37', 63' (5/6); Chanwille October 80' (1/1); Pen: Arno Coetzee 11' (1/1)	Referee: Jacques Nieuwenhuis

Bye/s: Bloemfontein Crusaders

===== Round four =====
14 March 2015	College Rovers	52–6	Bloemfontein Crusaders	KP3, Kings Park, Durban
16:00	Try: TC Khoza 11'; Dusty Noble 22', 51'; Paul Bester 27'; Wade Elliot 35'; Graham Geldenhuys 69'; Luciando Santos 78'; Matt Phillips 80'; Con: Chris Micklewood 12', 23', 28', 36' (4/5); Jeandré Small 70', 79' (2/3); Cards: Luciando Santos (yellow card) 59' to 70'; Graham Geldenhuys (yellow card) 75'	Scoreboard	Pen: Sherwin Slater 7', 32' (2/2); Darren Baron (0/2); Cards: Joachim Hoffman (yellow card) 78'	Referee: Jaco Kotze

14 March 2015	Raiders	31–54	Pretoria Police	Bill Jardine Stadium, Johannesburg
16:00	Try: Gustav de Vos 46'; Chris Nqubuli 56', 63'; Ben Sekgobela 77'; Chris Juries 80'; Con: Arno Coetzee 57', 64', 78' (3/5); Pen: Arno Coetzee (0/1); Cards: Velaphi Khumalo (yellow card) 28'; Arafaat Kock (yellow card) 71'	Scoreboard	Try: Michael Nienaber 6'; Ian van Deventer 13'; Birtie Powell 23'; Hendrik van der Nest 28', 37'; Gaybrin Smith 39'; Heinrich Rademeyer 50'; Natal de Sousa 67'; Con: Dillon Laubscher 7', 14', 29', 38', 39', 51', 68' (7/8); Cards: Nico Luus (yellow card) 43' to 54'; Luga van Biljon (yellow card) 61' to 72'	Referee: Renier Vermeulen

Bye/s: Noordelikes

===== Round five =====
21 March 2015	Raiders	15–25	College Rovers	Bill Jardine Stadium, Johannesburg
15:30	Try: penalty try 30'; Marceau Alberts 72'; Con: Arno Coetzee 31' (1/1); Gardener Nechironga (0/1); Pen: Arno Coetzee 46' (1/2)	Scoreboard	Try: Kyle Wilkinson 3'; Chris Jordaan 5', 33'; Con: Chris Micklewood 6' (1/2); Kyle Wilkinson 33' (1/1); Pen: Kyle Wilkinson (0/1); Chris Micklewood 48' (1/1); Drop: Chris Micklewood 68' (1/2); Cards: Chris Micklewood (yellow card) 30' to 40'	Referee: Ricus van der Hoven

21 March 2015	Noordelikes	22–25	Bloemfontein Crusaders	Noordelikes Rugby Club, Polokwane
16:30	Try: Simthandile Memese 9'; Gert van der Merwe 38'; Leslie Venton 61'; Wickus Visser 66'; Con: Zander Byleveldt 67' (1/3); Alwyn Olivier (0/1); Pen: Zander Byleveldt (0/3); Cards: Dustin Hoffmann (yellow card) 43' to 53'	Scoreboard	Try: Blaine Tlhapane 44'; Sherwin Slater 48'; Brandon Colby 54'; Con: Griffin Colby 45', 49' (2/3); Pen: Morné Morolong 3' (1/1); Griffin Colby 64' (1/1); Cards: Donavan Ball (yellow card) 28' to 37'	Referee: Pieter Maritz

Bye/s: Pretoria Police

=== Pool C ===
==== Log ====
2015 SARU Community Cup Pool C Log
Pos	Team	Pl	W	D	L	PF	PA	PD	TF	TA	TB	LB	Pts
1	Hamiltons	4	3	1	0	151	120	+31	19	15	3	0	17
2	Wanderers	4	2	1	1	140	117	+23	21	14	4	1	15
3	Evergreens	4	2	1	1	99	110	−11	9	16	0	0	10
4	Villagers Worcester	4	1	0	3	98	129	−31	13	15	2	2	8
5	Sishen	4	0	1	3	88	100	−12	10	12	1	3	6
* Legend: Pos = Position, Pl = Played, W = Won, D = Drawn, L = Lost, PF = Points for, PA = Points against, PD = Points difference, TF = Tries for, TA = Tries against, TB = Try bonus points, LB = Losing bonus points, Pts = Log points Hamiltons and Wanderers qualified for the finals. Points breakdown: *4 points for a win *2 points for a draw *1 bonus point for a loss by seven points or less *1 bonus point for scoring four or more tries in a match

==== Fixtures and results ====
===== Round one =====
21 February 2015	Evergreens	22–15	Villagers Worcester	Pacaltsdorp Sports Ground, Pacaltsdorp
14:30	Try: Gerschwin Muller 4'; Con: Leegan Moos 5' (1/1); Pen: Deroy Rhoode (0/1); Leegan Moos 24', 45', 55', 60', 67' (5/5); Cards: Chris Kruger (yellow card) 52' to 62'	Scoreboard	Try: Louis Carstens 20'; TC Botha 75'; Con: Shandro Issel 21' (1/2); Pen: Shandro Issel 39' (1/3); Drop: Yazeed Johnson (0/1); Cards: Wayne Wilschut (yellow card) 59' to 69'	Referee: Rodney Boneparte

21 February 2015	Sishen	24–25	Hamiltons	Sivos Rugby Stadium, Kathu
16:00	Try: Prince Mofokeng 33'; Jamie Zwiegelaar 45'; Con: Tiaan le Roux 46' (1/2); Pen: Tiaan le Roux 3', 21', 60' (3/4); Drop: Tiaan le Roux 54' (1/1)	Scoreboard	Try: Sebastian Ferreira 8'; Morgan Newman 57'; Niel Cleghorn 63'; Con: Shane Vallender 9', 64' (2/3); Pen: Shane Vallender 23', 61' (2/2); Cards: Ryno Rust (yellow card) 67'	Attendance: 800; Referee: AJ Jacobs

Bye/s: Wanderers

===== Round two =====
28 February 2015	Hamiltons	40–40	Wanderers	Stephan Oval, Green Point, Cape Town
14:30	Try: Jano van Zyl 29', 40'; Francois Hanekom 48'; Niel Cleghorn 55'; Con: Shane Vallender 29' (1/1); Jano van Zyl 40' (1/1); Monty Dumond 49', 56' (2/2); Pen: Shane Vallender 37' (1/1); Monty Dumond 66', 72', 80' (3/3)	Scoreboard	Try: Kyle Dutton 14', 42'; Dylan Rutherford 32'; Craig Kolarik 44'; Rory Anderson 63'; Wesley Flanagan 74'; Con: Craig Kolarik (0/1); Menzi Sikhulile Ngidi 33', 43', 45', 64', 75' (5/5); Pen: Craig Kolarik (0/1); Menzi Sikhulile Ngidi (0/2); Cards: Anthony Jacob Gallacher (yellow card) 45' to 55'	Referee: Jason Jaftha

28 February 2015	Villagers Worcester	18–13	Sishen	Boland Park, Worcester
16:00	Try: Nazeem Nilton van Sitters 52'; Yrin Quift Belelie 75'; Con: Ricardo Jones (0/1); Nazeem Nilton van Sitters 76' (1/1); Pen: Nazeem Nilton van Sitters 14' (1/1); Ricardo Jones 47' (1/2); Cards: Ernst Hendrik Wolfaardt Claassen (yellow card) 11' to 21'; Ronwynne Daniel Swanepoel (yellow card) 67' to 77'; Jasherie Kariem (yellow card) 72'	Scoreboard	Try: Adolf du Plessis 21'; Con: Tiaan le Roux 22' (1/1); Pen: Tiaan le Roux (0/1); André Roberts 50', 73' (2/3); Cards: Jamie Zwiegelaar (yellow card) 13' to 23'	Attendance: 1,000; Referee: Francois Pretorius

Bye/s: Evergreens

===== Round three =====
7 March 2015	Evergreens	26–20	Wanderers	Pacaltsdorp Sports Ground, Pacaltsdorp
16:00	Try: Anvor Prins 7'; Joseph Fortuin 25'; Leegan Moos 67'; Con: Leegan Moos 68' (1/3); Pen: Leegan Moos 1', 12', 53' (3/3); Luzanne Williams (0/1)	Scoreboard	Try: Darryn Rentzke 9', 18'; Nicolas van Rooyen 42'; Wesley Flanagan 45'; Con: Menzi Sikhulile Ngidi (0/3); Darryn Rentzke (0/1)	Referee: Ruhan Meiring

7 March 2015	Villagers Worcester	35–41	Hamiltons	Boland Park, Worcester
16:00	Try: Ricardo Jones 10', 18'; Jowayne van Wyk 27'; Wayne Wilschut 44'; Jasherie Kariem 66'; Con: Nazeem Nilton van Sitters 11', 19', 28', 45', 67' (5/5); Pen: Nazeem Nilton van Sitters (0/1)	Scoreboard	Try: Pierre Cronjé 3'; Henk Franken 13'; Jano van Zyl 36', 49'; Craig Pheiffer 52'; Francois Esterhuyzen 79'; Con: Monty Dumond 4', 14', 37' (3/3); Shane Vallender (0/1); Jano van Zyl (0/1); Earl Lewis 80' (1/1); Pen: Jano van Zyl 62' (1/2)	Referee: Sindile Ngcese

Bye/s: Sishen

===== Round four =====
14 March 2015	Sishen	30–30	Evergreens	Sivos Rugby Stadium, Kathu
16:00	Try: Gummy Roux 4', 56'; Ryan de Wee 24'; Jamie Zwiegelaar 47'; Con: Tiaan le Roux 48', 57' (2/4); Pen: Tiaan le Roux 12' (1/3); André Roberts 70' (1/1); Cards: Nico Graaff (yellow card) 73'	Scoreboard	Try: Deroy Rhoode 27'; Luzanne Williams 33'; Gerschwin Muller 78'; Con: Leegan Moos 28', 34', 79' (3/3); Pen: Leegan Moos 43', 65', 80' (3/3); Cards: Riaan Basson (yellow card) 73'	Referee: Khotso Raleting

14 March 2015	Wanderers	53–30	Villagers Worcester	Kent Park, Johannesburg
16:00	Try: Richard Aingworth 26', 73'; Jonathan Mallett 31'; Wesley Flanagan 38', 58'; Carl Gliddon 68'; Nicolas van Rooyen 76'; Con: Darryn Rentzke 27', 32', 39', 59', 69', 74' (6/6); Kewan Gibb (0/1); Pen: Darryn Rentzke 5', 11' (2/3); Cards: Gareth David Fennell (yellow card) 33'	Scoreboard	Try: Ernst Hendrik Wolfaardt Claassen 17'; Nazeem Nilton van Sitters 51', 80'; Ricardo Jones 64'; Con: Nazeem Nilton van Sitters 18', 52' (2/3); Ricardo Jones (0/1); Pen: Nazeem Nilton van Sitters 9', 28' (2/3); Cards: Morné Boshoff (yellow card) 76'	Referee: Godwill Morebe

Bye/s: Hamiltons

===== Round five =====
21 March 2015	Hamiltons	45–21	Evergreens	Stephan Oval, Green Point, Cape Town
16:00	Try: Jody Burch 8', 35'; Monty Dumond 22'; Greg van Jaarsveld 45'; Craig Pheiffer 60'; Iewan Bartels 68'; Con: Monty Dumond 9', 23', 36', 46' (4/4); Shane Vallender 61', 69' (2/2); Pen: Monty Dumond (0/1); Shane Vallender 72' (1/1)	Scoreboard	Try: Joseph Fortuin 13'; Luzanne Williams 29'; Con: Leegan Moos 30' (1/2); Pen: Leegan Moos 38', 40', 51' (3/3)	Referee: Egon Seconds

21 March 2015	Wanderers	27–21	Sishen	Kent Park, Johannesburg
16:00	Try: Nicolas van Rooyen 22'; Geoff Wood 54'; Jonathan Mallett 64'; Richard Aingworth 73'; Con: Darryn Rentzke 23', 55' (2/4); Pen: Darryn Rentzke 41' (1/2)	Scoreboard	Try: Prince Mofokeng 4', 67'; Jovan Cookson 77'; Con: Tiaan le Roux 5', 68' (2/2); André Roberts 78' (1/1); Pen: Tiaan le Roux (0/1)	Referee: Renie Coetzee

Bye/s: Villagers Worcester

=== Pool D ===
==== Log ====
2015 SARU Community Cup Pool D Log
Pos	Team	Pl	W	D	L	PF	PA	PD	TF	TA	TB	LB	Pts
1	Despatch	4	3	0	1	171	124	+47	24	16	4	0	16
2	Wesbank	4	3	0	1	118	99	+19	16	15	3	0	15
3	Durban Collegians	4	3	0	1	130	92	+38	17	10	3	0	15
4	Witbank Ferros	4	1	0	3	122	135	−13	16	18	2	1	7
5	Welkom Rovers	4	0	0	4	102	193	−91	12	26	2	1	3
* Legend: Pos = Position, Pl = Played, W = Won, D = Drawn, L = Lost, PF = Points for, PA = Points against, PD = Points difference, TF = Tries for, TA = Tries against, TB = Try bonus points, LB = Losing bonus points, Pts = Log points Despatch and Wesbank qualified for the finals. Points breakdown: *4 points for a win *2 points for a draw *1 bonus point for a loss by seven points or less *1 bonus point for scoring four or more tries in a match

==== Fixtures and results ====
===== Round one =====
21 February 2015	Welkom Rovers	32–69	Despatch	Welkom Rovers Rugby Club, Welkom
16:00	Try: Wayne Ludick 29'; Shaun Nieuwenhuyzen 56', 64', 71'; Con: Tiaan van Wyk 30', 57', 65' (3/4); Pen: Tiaan van Wyk 18' (1/1); Drop: Shaun Nieuwenhuyzen 27' (1/1)	Scoreboard	Try: Michael Vermaak 12', 40'; Trichardt van Tonder 34'; Elroy Ligman 38'; Cameron Jacobs 50'; Kalvano King 62', 67', 69'; Elrich Kock 76'; Con: Francois Nel 13', 35', 39', 40', 51', 63', 68', 70', 77' (9/9); Pen: Francois Nel 3', 8' (2/2); Cards: Siviwe Magaba (yellow card) 79'	Referee: Lourens van der Merwe

21 February 2015	Wesbank	32–13	Witbank Ferros	Wesbank Sports Grounds, Malmesbury
16:00	Try: Chrislyn van Schalkwyk 13', 53'; Anvon Davids 25'; Johan September 60'; Con: Dashton Wellman 26', 54', 61' (3/4); Pen: Dashton Wellman 41' (1/1); Drop: Dashton Wellman 69' (1/1); Cards: Ronnie Appolis (yellow card) 78'	Scoreboard	Try: Willem Kotze 50'; Pule Sibiya 72'; Con: Jannie van der Merwe (0/2); Pen: Jannie van der Merwe 3' (1/1); Cards: Willie Muller (yellow card) 30' to 40'	Attendance: 1,500; Referee: Cwengile Jadezweni

Bye/s: Durban Collegians

===== Round two =====
28 February 2015	Despatch	43–25	Wesbank	WJ de Wet Stadium, Despatch
16:00	Try: Siviwe Magaba 21'; Basil de Doncker 27'; Kalvano King 38'; Cameron Jacobs 52'; Elroy Ligman 55'; Jaco Swanepoel 74'; Billy Mintoor 78'; Con: Morné Labuschagne 39', 56', 75', 79' (4/7); Cards: Ayanda Nogampula (yellow card) 65' to 75'; Trichardt van Tonder (yellow card) 72'	Scoreboard	Try: Anvon Davids 3'; Evan Liedeman 11'; Salmon Coetzee 18'; Con: Evan Liedeman (0/1); Dashton Wellman 12', 19' (2/2); Pen: Dashton Wellman 65', 70' (2/3); Cards: Melvin Laserus (yellow card) 28' to 39'; Nicholas Duhwa (yellow card) 50' to 60'	Attendance: 2,000; Referee: Fernando Uithaler

28 February 2015	Durban Collegians	30–12	Welkom Rovers	KP10, Kings Park, Durban
16:00	Try: Brandon Backeberg 21'; Calvin Sacks 71'; Greg Bauer 75'; Mondli Nkosi 82'; Con: Brendon Cope 71', 82' (2/4); Pen: Brendon Cope 34', 42' (2/2); Cards: Robbie Harris (yellow card) 7' to 17'; Dylan Nel (yellow card) 34' to 44'; Joseph Dean Shelley (yellow card) 34' to 44'	Scoreboard	Pen: Tiaan van Wyk 43', 46', 74', 75' (4/4); Cards: Shaun Nieuwenhuyzen (yellow card) 66'	Referee: Vusi Msibi

Bye/s: Witbank Ferros

===== Round three =====
7 March 2015	Witbank Ferros	26–29	Despatch	Puma Stadium, Witbank
15:00	Try: Christiaan Els 2'; Werno Smit 30'; Henson Ngozo 66'; Louis Roos 80'; Con: Jannie van der Merwe 3', 67', 81' (3/4); Cards: Theo Kruger (yellow card) 76'	Scoreboard	Try: Billy Mintoor 33', 58'; Marlon Lewis 48'; Jaco Swanepoel 77'; Con: Ryan Brown 34', 49' (2/3); Justin Peach 78' (1/1); Pen: Ryan Brown 40' (1/2)	Referee: Ricus van der Hoven

7 March 2015	Wesbank	34–20	Durban Collegians	Wesbank Sports Grounds, Malmesbury
16:00	Try: Evan Liedeman 5'; Nicholas Duhwa 16'; Anvon Davids 56'; Melvin Laserus 66'; Ronnie Appolis 76'; Con: Dashton Wellman 6', 57', 77' (3/5); Pen: Dashton Wellman 70' (1/5); Cards: Melvin Laserus (yellow card) 20' to 30'	Scoreboard	Try: Brendon Groenewald 26'; Keelin Bastew 33'; Andrew Holland 74'; Con: Brendon Cope 27' (1/3); Pen: Duncan Campbell (0/1); Brendon Cope 48' (1/1); Cards: Joseph Dean Shelley (yellow card) 20' to 30'	Referee: Divan Uys

Bye/s: Welkom Rovers

===== Round four =====
14 March 2015	Durban Collegians	39–16	Witbank Ferros	KP3, Kings Park, Durban
13:30	Try: Kyle Hartley 11'; Gareth Reece-Edwards 21'; Keelin Bastew 43'; Ferdie Horn 46'; Brendon Groenewald 57'; Con: Duncan Campbell 22', 44', 47', 58' (4/5); Pen: Duncan Campbell 5', 42' (2/3); Cards: Wian Vosloo (yellow card) 34' to 44'; Ferdie Horn (red card) 78'	Scoreboard	Try: Tommie Collen 14'; Con: Jannie van der Merwe 15' (1/1); Pen: Jannie van der Merwe 3', 9', 26' (3/3); Cards: Willem van Niekerk (red card) 74'	Attendance: 3,000; Referee: Ricus van der Hoven

14 March 2015	Welkom Rovers	23–27	Wesbank	Welkom Rovers Rugby Club, Welkom
16:00	Try: Patrick Kampher 59'; Wayne Ludick 64'; Freddie Wepener 66'; Con: Tiaan van Wyk 65' (1/3); Pen: Tiaan van Wyk 9', 75' (2/2); Cards: Freddie Wepener (yellow card) 29' to 39'; Shaun Nieuwenhuyzen (yellow card) 33' to 43'	Scoreboard	Try: Chrislyn van Schalkwyk 10'; Salmon Coetzee 20'; Melvin Laserus 43'; Evan Liedeman 78'; Con: Evan Liedeman (0/2); Dashton Wellman 21', 44' (2/2); Pen: Evan Liedeman (0/1); Dashton Wellman 26' (1/1); Cards: Coenie Westraadt (yellow card) 58' to 68'	Referee: Paul Mente

Bye/s: Despatch

===== Round five =====
21 March 2015	Witbank Ferros	67–35	Welkom Rovers	Puma Stadium, Witbank
15:00	Try: Izan Green 3'; Bennie Mashabane 12'; Jannie van der Merwe 28'; Christiaan Els 50'; Tommie Collen 56'; Pule Sibiya 62', 77'; Louis Roos 71', 79'; Con: Jannie van der Merwe 4', 13', 29', 51', 57' (5/6); Armand Botha 72', 78', 80' (3/3); Pen: Jannie van der Merwe 25', 47' (2/2)	Scoreboard	Try: Freddie Wepener 6', 41'; Wayne Ludick 30'; Shaun Prins 52'; LC van Tonder 58'; Con: Tiaan van Wyk 7', 31', 42', 53', 59' (5/5)	Referee: Renier Vermeulen

21 March 2015	Despatch	30–41	Durban Collegians	WJ de Wet Stadium, Despatch
16:00	Try: Billy Mintoor 9', 19'; Dyllan Lamprecht 16'; Francois Nel 72'; Con: Ryan Brown 10' (1/3); Francois Nel 73' (1/1); Pen: Justin Peach 39' (1/2) Francois Nel 79' (1/1); Cards: Lesley Luiters (yellow card) 25' to 35'	Scoreboard	Try: Ferdie Horn 13'; Kyle Hartley 21', 29'; Brendon Groenewald 59'; Brendon Cope 61'; Con: Duncan Campbell 14', 22' (2/2); Brendon Cope 30', 60', 62' (3/3); Pen: Brendon Cope 55', 65' (2/2)	Referee: Sindile Ngcese

Bye/s: Wesbank

== Play-offs ==
The play-offs will be played at the home of the 2014 champions, Rustenburg Impala, from 2 to 6 April 2015. This will be the first time that the play-offs will be hosted in Rustenburg, with the previous two play-offs in 2013 and 2014 held in George.

=== Quarter-finals ===
The winning teams will qualify to the Cup semi-finals, while the losing teams will qualify to the Plate Semi-finals.

2 April 2015	Hamiltons	34–26	Wesbank	Rustenburg Impala Rugby Club, Rustenburg
10:00	Try: Jody Burch 4'; Earl Lewis 43'; Francois Esterhuyzen 47'; Con: Monty Dumond 5', 47' (2/3); Pen: Monty Dumond 16', 51', 60', 64' (4/5); Shane Vallender 77' (1/1)	Scoreboard	Try: Ronnie Appolis 6'; Chrislyn van Schalkwyk 37'; Anvon Davids 56'; Con: Dashton Wellman 7' (1/3); Pen: Dashton Wellman 28', 53', 69' (3/5); Drop: Dashton Wellman (0/1)	Referee: AJ Jacobs

2 April 2015	Durbanville-Bellville	30–25	College Rovers	Rustenburg Impala Rugby Club, Rustenburg
12:00	Try: Marnus Hugo 7'; Marius White 24'; Danwel Demas 51'; Con: Raymond Olivier 8', 25', 52' (3/3); Pen: Raymond Olivier 28', 45', 59' (3/4)	Scoreboard	Try: Chris Jordaan 1'; TC Khoza 56'; Chris Micklewood 73'; Con: Chris Micklewood 57', 74' (2/3); Pen: Chris Micklewood 11', 40' (2/2)	Referee: Renier Vermeulen

2 April 2015	Despatch	25–14	Wanderers	Rustenburg Impala Rugby Club, Rustenburg
14:00	Try: Selvyn Davids 4'; Stephan Deyzel 18'; Francois Nel 42'; Morné Labuschagne 70'; Con: Francois Nel (0/3); Justin Peach 71' (1/1); Pen: Francois Nel 36' (1/3); Drop: Francois Nel (0/1)	Scoreboard	Try: Dylan Rutherford 15'; Wesley Flanagan 31'; Con: Craig Kolarik 16', 32' (2/2); Pen: Darryn Rentzke (0/2); Craig Kolarik (0/1); Cards: Dylan Rutherford (yellow card) 22' to 32'	Referee: Jaco Pretorius

2 April 2015	Rustenburg Impala	30–28	Pretoria Police	Rustenburg Impala Rugby Club, Rustenburg
16:00	Try: Aubrey McDonald 1'; Morné Jooste 6'; Cecil Dumond 32'; Leon du Plessis 50'; Con: Willie Kok 7', 51' (2/4); Pen: Willie Kok 20' (1/3); Wilco de Wet 80' (1/1); Cards: Aubrey McDonald (yellow card) 14' to 24'; Tiaan Nel (yellow card) 35' to 45'; Dumisani Matyeshana (yellow card) 75'	Scoreboard	Try: Strepies van Loo 40'; Michael Nienaber 41'; Elvis Noludwe 78'; Con: Dillon Laubscher 40', 42' (2/3); Pen: Dillon Laubscher 5', 14', 64' (3/3); Drop: Gaybrin Smith (0/1); Cards: Heinrich Rademeyer (yellow card) 14' to 24'; Michael Nienaber (yellow card) 67' to 77'	Referee: Archie Sehlako

=== Cup semi-finals ===
The winning teams qualify to the Cup final, while the losing teams qualify to the Cup Third-place play-off.

4 April 2015	Despatch	27–29	Durbanville-Bellville	Rustenburg Impala Rugby Club, Rustenburg
14:00	Try: Justin Peach 4'; Dumisani Meslane 56'; Jaco Swanepoel 60'; Lesley Luiters 66'; Con: Francois Nel 5' (1/1); Justin Peach 57' (1/1); Pen: Francois Nel (0/1); Ryan Brown 74' (1/1)	Scoreboard	Try: Douw Wessels 13'; Renier Marais 28'; Con: Garth April 14', 29' (2/2); Pen: Raymond Olivier 20', 38', 52' (3/4); Garth April 72', 78' (2/2); Drop: Tiaan Radyn (0/1)	Referee: Archie Sehlako

4 April 2015	Hamiltons	18–21	Rustenburg Impala	Rustenburg Impala Rugby Club, Rustenburg
16:00	Try: Earl Lewis 69'; Iewan Bartels 78'; Con: Shane Vallender 70' (1/2); Pen: Monty Dumond 17', 40' (2/4); Cards: Jacques Oosthuizen (yellow card) 26' to 36'	Scoreboard	Try: Aubrey McDonald 57'; Joe Seerane 60'; Con: Wilco de Wet 58' (1/2); Pen: Wilco de Wet 27', 46' (2/4); Drop: Cecil Dumond 38' (1/1); Cards: Willie Kok (yellow card) 19' to 30'	Referee: Renier Vermeulen

=== Plate Semi-finals ===
The winning teams qualify to the Plate final, while the losing teams qualify to the Plate Third-place play-off.

4 April 2015	Wanderers	19–24	College Rovers	Rustenburg Impala Rugby Club, Rustenburg
10:00	Try: Sifiso Mgaga 11'; Dylan Rutherford 49'; Azola Mda 72'; Con: Craig Kolarik 12', 50' (2/2); Darryn Rentzke (0/1)	Scoreboard	Try: Chris Jordaan 4', 22', 27'; Paul Bester 36'; Con: Chris Micklewood 28', 37' (2/4); Drop: Chris Micklewood (0/1)	Referee: AJ Jacobs

4 April 2015	Wesbank	31–36	Pretoria Police	Rustenburg Impala Rugby Club, Rustenburg
12:00	Try: Sedwell Diedericks 16'; Chrislyn van Schalkwyk 2138'; Johannes Slabber 31'; Con: Dashton Wellman 17', 22', 32', 39' (4/4); Pen: Dashton Wellman (0/2); Theodore Marinus 76' (1/2); Drop: Dashton Wellman (0/1); Cards: Emgee Fredericks (yellow card) 77'	Scoreboard	Try: Daron Liebenberg 13'; Birtie Powell 49'; Hendrik van der Nest 59'; Natal de Sousa 68'; Nico Luus 78'; Ian van Deventer 80'; Con: Dillon Laubscher 14', 79', 81' (3/6)	Referee: Jaco Pretorius

=== Cup final ===
6 April 2015	Rustenburg Impala	30–31	Durbanville-Bellville	Rustenburg Impala Rugby Club, Rustenburg
14:30	Try: Gavin Williamson 8'; Cecil Dumond 35'; Dumisani Matyeshana 62'; Jermaine Apollis 74'; Con: Wilco de Wet 36', 75' (2/4); Pen: Wilco de Wet 43', 48' (2/3)	Scoreboard	Try: Garth April 29'; Angus Cleophas 45'; Brendon April 60'; Con: Garth April 30', 60' (2/3); Pen: Raymond Olivier 13', 71' (2/4); Garth April 56', 77' (2/2); Drop: Tiaan Radyn (0/1); Garth April (0/1)	Referee: Renier Vermeulen

=== Cup Third-place play-off ===
6 April 2015	Hamiltons	66–40	Despatch	Rustenburg Impala Rugby Club, Rustenburg
12:30	Try: Tapiwa Tsomondo 4'; Monty Dumond 7'; Earl Lewis 12', 55'; Sebastian Ferreira 16'; Jano van Zyl 21'; Jody Burch 29'; Jacques Oosthuizen 57'; Pierre Cronjé 68', 75'; Con: Monty Dumond 5', 8', 17', 22', 30', 56', 58' (7/8); Shane Vallender 69' (1/1); Cards: Jacques Oosthuizen (yellow card) 78'	Scoreboard	Try: Michael Vermaak 20'; Dumisani Meslane 24'; Baldwin McBean 27', 39'; Stephan Deyzel 74'; Basil de Doncker 79'; Con: Selvyn Davids 21', 28', 40', 75', 80' (5/6); Cards: Elroy Ligman (yellow card) 63'	Referee: Jaco Pretorius

=== Plate final ===
6 April 2015	Pretoria Police	37–15	College Rovers	Rustenburg Impala Rugby Club, Rustenburg
10:30	Try: Jerry Sefoko 6'; Dillon Laubscher 51'; Strepies van Loo 58'; Ian van Deventer 69', 81'; Con: Dillon Laubscher 52', 59' (2/4); Pieter Strydom 82' (1/1); Pen: Dillon Laubscher 11', 32' (2/2); Strepies van Loo (0/1); Cards: Hendrik van der Nest (yellow card) 71'	Scoreboard	Try: Jongi Nokwe 35'; Roan Dalzell 74'; Con: Chris Micklewood 36' (1/1); Gary Collins (0/1); Pen: Chris Micklewood 27' (1/3); Cards: Luciando Santos (yellow card) 60' to 71'; Chris Kemp (yellow card) 71'	Referee: Archie Sehlako

=== Plate Third-place play-off ===
6 April 2015	Wesbank	35–45	Wanderers	Rustenburg Impala Rugby Club, Rustenburg
8:30	Try: Johan September 16'; Salmon Coetzee 20', 44', 83'; Vincent Fredericks 67'; Con: Theodore Marinus 17', 21', 45', 68', 84' (5/5)	Scoreboard	Try: Darryn Rentzke 10'; Wesley Flanagan 30', 76'; Kyle Dutton 41'; Dylan Rutherford 47'; Carl Gliddon 55'; Craig Kolarik 61'; Con: Darryn Rentzke 11', 57', 62', 77' (4/6); Craig Kolarik 42' (1/1)	Referee: AJ Jacobs

== Honours ==
2015 SARU Community Cup champions:	Durbanville-Bellville
Player of the Tournament:	Leon du Plessis, Rustenburg Impala
Young Player of the Tournament:	Garth April, Durbanville-Bellville
Top Try Scorer:	Wesley Flanagan, Wanderers / Chris Jordaan, College Rovers (7)
Top Points Scorer:	Raymond Olivier, Durbanville-Bellville (85)
Coach of the Tournament:	Jan Loubser, Durbanville-Bellville
Manager of the Tournament:	Michael Stakemire, Hamiltons

== Players ==
=== Squad lists ===
The teams released the following squad lists:

Bloemfontein Crusaders

Forwards

- Donavan Ball
- Moekoa Bolofo
- Zane Botha
- Daniel Caku-Caku
- Max Chabane
- Joseph Dweba
- Lebogang Gabole
- Joachim Hoffman
- Duane Krull
- Don Manus
- Gustav Muller
- Randall Nelson
- Leon Strydom
- Lebohang Tsoeu
- Johnny van der Merwe
- Johannes van Niekerk
- Did not play:
- Mangaliso Matakane
- Gavin Pitt
- Wayven Smith

Backs

- Algernon Andries
- Darren Baron
- Alvin Brandt
- Enver Brandt
- Brandon Colby
- Griffin Colby
- Jason Horne
- Chadwill Jegels
- Isak Job
- Patric Mbangi
- Morné Morolong
- Sherwin Slater
- Michael Smit
- Blaine Tlhapane
- Frans van der Merwe
- Bjorn van Wyk
- Did not play:
- Perry Appies
- Darren Colby
- Bennie Gouws
- Phumzile Mafika
- Luyanda Tole

tbc

- Lucky Joseph Beetha
- Morné Schaffers
- Wayne Armand Slabbert

Coach

- Eddie Fredericks

College Rovers

Forwards

- Paul Bester
- Nikolai Blignaut
- Chesney Botha
- Simba Bwanya
- Jarrett Crouch
- Roan Dalzell
- Christiaan de Bruin
- Wade Elliot
- Senna Esterhuizen
- Graham Geldenhuys
- André Greyvenstein
- Cameron Holenstein
- Matt Jones
- Chris Kemp
- TC Khoza
- Witness Mandizha
- Njabulo Mkize
- Royal Mwale
- Sangoni Mxoli
- Luciando Santos
- Thabo Tshabalala
- Johan Wagenaar
- Did not play:
- Kelvin Adam
- Nico Bezuidenhout
- Chris Cloete
- Duan Coertzen
- Jonno Deighton
- Sbusiso Dube
- Louis Hazelhurst
- Mathew Jackson
- Joseph Oscar Jones
- Jason Kankowski
- Fudge Mabeta
- Sphephelo Mayaba
- Mesuli Mncwango
- Thabo Ngcongo
- Edlyn Serge
- Sanele Sibanda
- Brandon Squires
- Matt Tweddle
- Jason Viviers

Backs

- Keagan Boulle
- Gary Collins
- Quinton Crocker
- Guy Cronjé
- Dumisani Dyonase
- Gareth Jenkinson
- Chris Jordaan
- Kobus Lourens
- Chris Micklewood
- Dusty Noble
- Howard Noble
- Jongi Nokwe
- Riaan O'Neill
- Matt Phillips
- Warren Randall
- Jeandré Small
- Kyle Wilkinson
- Did not play:
- Jake Adam
- Jared Chiocchetti
- Ntuthuko Khumalo
- Gavin Scott
- Anton Verster

tbc

- Chris Anker
- Josh Caruth
- Muzi Israel Dludlu
- Anthony Fivaz
- Juan Pierre Jonck
- Kyle McGarvie
- Lebogang Lawrence Molefe

Coach

- Derek Hieberg

Despatch

Forwards

- Dalton Davis
- Stephan Deyzel
- Bobby Dyer
- Sinjin Greyvenstein
- Elrich Kock
- Dyllan Lamprecht
- Elroy Ligman
- Dumisani Meslane
- Ayanda Nogampula
- Robert Slabbert
- Jaco Swanepoel
- Kobus van der Westhuizen
- Trichardt van Tonder
- Darren van Winkel
- Michael Vermaak
- Ashley Viviers
- Did not play:
- Tashrique Hearne
- Elandré Nel
- Deon Plaatjies
- Jason Strydom
- Morné Strydom
- Armand van Rooyen

Backs

- Ryan Brown
- Selvyn Davids
- Basil de Doncker
- Cameron Jacobs
- Kalvano King
- Morné Labuschagne
- Marlon Lewis
- Lesley Luiters
- Siviwe Magaba
- Baldwin McBean
- Billy Mintoor
- Francois Nel
- Justin Peach
- Wilton Pietersen
- Andile Witbooi
- Did not play:
- Ashwill Adams
- Elandré Basson
- Jaco Bekker
- Deon Booysen
- Aluzant Munnink
- Rosseau Prinsloo

Coach

- Adri Geldenhuys

Durban Collegians

Forwards

- Brandon Backeberg
- Greg Bauer
- Chris Bosch
- Brendon Groenewald
- Robbie Harris
- Stephan Hartman
- Ferdie Horn
- Carl Marks
- Dylan Nel
- Gareth Reece-Edwards
- Joseph Dean Shelley
- Jared Sichel
- Themba Sishi
- Jacques Taylor
- Linda Thwala
- Wian Vosloo
- Did not play:
- Norman Cloete
- Cullen Collopy
- Bruce Curtis
- Adriaan de la Rey
- Michael Downer
- Skholiwe Ndlovu
- Kamogelo Qhu
- Kurt Schonert
- Fanele Zwane

Backs

- Keelin Bastew
- Werner Botha
- Duncan Campbell
- Brendon Cope
- Jacques Fick
- Kyle Hartley
- Andrew Holland
- Dylan Marcus
- Nkululeko Mcuma
- Lindani Ndlela
- Mondli Nkosi
- Calvin Sacks
- Did not play:
- Ethan Beukes
- Handré Bezuidenhout
- Joshua Bragman
- Steve Crause
- Luke Fouché
- Dean Lovett
- Sipho Mkhize
- Justin Newman
- Gerhardus Roets
- Mynhardt van Schalkwyk
- Dougie Warden

tbc

- Byron Johnstone
- Jacques Roux
- Antony Smith

Coach

- Robin Swanepoel

Durbanville-Bellville

Forwards

- Alconray Botha
- Ashton Constant
- Leonard Duvenhage
- Erasmus Jooste
- Rohan Kitshoff
- Karl Liebenberg
- Pieter Loubser
- Renier Marais
- Andrew Picoto
- JP Prinsloo
- Waldo Prinsloo
- Jéan Rossouw
- Richter Rust
- Hano Snyman
- Douw Wessels
- Marius White
- Did not play:
- Beyers Bekker
- Eugene Butterworth
- Roderick Dalton
- Anton Duvenhage
- Jean-Pierre Ellard
- Christoff Janse van Rensburg
- Schalk Jooste
- Juan-Paul Kellerman
- Johann Lambrechts
- Nicolaas Cornelius Nel
- William Scott
- Ruan Snyman
- Morné Strydom
- Petrus van der Merwe
- Craig Walker

Backs

- Brendon April
- Garth April
- Angus Cleophas
- Luhann de Kock
- Danwel Demas
- Janco Gunter
- Marnus Hugo
- Jason Kriel
- Roderick Moses
- Raymond Olivier
- Tiaan Radyn
- Dane Sherratt
- Deon Thiart
- Did not play:
- Raynor Becker
- Léroy Bitterhout
- Francois Botha
- Shane Grundlingh
- Gavin Hauptfleisch
- Eldred James
- Mayibuye Ndwandwa
- Graham O'Leary
- Malan Roode
- Chevandré van Schoor

tbc

- Arthur William John Adonis
- Hermanus Petrus du Plessis
- Cornelis Rademeyer Ferreira
- Steward Ronald Jacobs
- Daniel David Krynauw
- Tiaan Roelofse
- Russell Roux
- Hanekom Gerrit Stoffberg
- Johan André Theron
- Branden Morné Vaarland
- Rouxan Vermeulen

Coach

- Jan Loubser

Evergreens

Forwards

- Eugene Barnard
- Riaan Basson
- Alrico Beukes
- Armand Coetzee
- Dean Hopp
- Chris Kruger
- Gerschwin Muller
- Byron November
- Alistair November
- Marvin November
- Anvor Prins
- Xavier Scholtz
- Isaac Treurnicht
- Llewellyn Treurnicht
- Did not play:
- Ronaldo Francisco Damons
- Gavin Delport
- Lorencois Olkers
- Rosco Snyman

Backs

- Quinton Afrika
- Kerwin Appollis
- Ru-Wahn Bredenkamp
- Joseph Fortuin
- Gideon Lambrechts
- Rudi Michaels
- Leegan Moos
- Mario Noordman
- Grant November
- Deroy Rhoode
- Deon Stoffels
- Luzanne Williams
- Did not play:
- Charl Kitching
- C-Than Justin Moos
- Lee-Roy Pojie
- Marchell Potts
- Chadley Stride
- Divandré Strydom
- Darren Wood

tbc

- Elton October

Coach

- Mirco Geduld

Hamiltons

Forwards

- Jody Burch
- Sandile Buthelezi
- Niel Cleghorn
- Marthinus Coetzee
- Francois Esterhuyzen
- Sebastian Ferreira
- Henk Franken
- Francois Hanekom
- Lutho Kote
- Christo McNish
- Jacques Oosthuizen
- Denzel Riddles
- Gareth Rowe
- Michael Teichmann
- Tapiwa Tsomondo
- Greg van Jaarsveld
- Michael Melt van Niekerk
- Did not play:
- Ross Beckett
- Tian Fick
- Patrick Holman
- Dugald Robertson
- Brand Taljaard
- Abraham Winter

Backs

- Iewan Bartels
- Andrew Coetzee
- Pierre Cronjé
- Jandré du Plessis
- Monty Dumond
- Braam Gerber
- Calvin Kotze
- Richard Lawson
- Earl Lewis
- Morgan Newman
- Ryno Rust
- Shane Vallender
- Jano van Zyl
- Did not play:
- Reinold Benade
- Terry Jacobs
- Shane Swart

tbc

- Hendrik Matthys Stefanus Ferreira
- Ryan Richard Douglas Johnson
- Nicholas Pearson
- Daniel Ilmar Pikker
- Jonathan Raphael

Coach

- Anton Moolman

Noordelikes

Forwards

- Bruné Bekker
- Dustin Hoffmann
- Juan Jacobs
- Johannes Christoffel Krog
- CP Louw
- Scheepers Lubbe
- Malope Masemola
- Simthandile Memese
- Shane Mienie
- Chrisjan Muller
- Lufuno Ramoyada
- Thabo Tladi
- Leslie Venton
- Wickus Visser
- Did not play:
- Nico Els
- Tienie Janse van Rensburg
- Webster Mugadi
- Jaco Rabe
- Ricardo Varela

Backs

- Zander Byleveldt
- Danie de Bruyn
- Theyman Jongbloed
- Alwyn Olivier
- Daniel Opperman
- Mynhardt Smith
- Gert van der Merwe
- Sias van Wyk
- Arno Venter
- JP Vermeulen
- Did not play:
- Johan de Beer
- Hans du Plessis
- Jacques Els
- Nick Enslin
- Benetton Freeman
- Zanru Fuchs
- Koning Janse van Rensburg
- Wallies Kubannek
- Pikswart Romijn
- Johannes Lodewikus van Niekerk

tbc

- Henri Leon Jordaan
- Willem Adolf Swanepoel
- Christiaan Lodewyk van Niekerk

Coach

- Pikswart Romijn

Old Selbornians

Forwards

- Duran Alberts
- Roy Bursey
- Billy Dutton
- Armon Fourie
- Craig Gombert
- Craig Green
- Anthonie Gronum
- Akona Makalima
- Richard Osner
- Craig Pedersen
- Dylan Pieterse
- Ryan Pietersen
- Jannie Rossouw
- Shane Spring
- Sinethemba Tyokolwana
- Did not play:
- Juan Bekker
- Delarey du Preez
- Grant Gombert
- Marc Hammond
- Ryan Hammond
- Dale Hobbs
- Xola Mapapu
- Siyabonga Mxunyelwa
- Peter Smith
- Marcel Swanepoel
- Travis Venter
- Neil Wood

Backs

- Bradley Birkholtz
- Lindani Gulwa
- Curtis Kleinhans
- MJ le Marquand
- Leon Mauer
- Yongama Mkaza
- Saneliso Ngoma
- Phiwe Nomlomo
- Foxy Ntleki
- Dale Sabbagh
- Craig Shone
- Bjorn van Zyl
- Paul Warner
- Did not play:
- Michael Amui
- Wade Bailey
- Gareth Catherine
- Eric Coates
- Lunga Dumezweni
- Royden Kennedy
- Sibabalwe Mtsulwana
- James Posthumus
- Warren Rielly
- Jared Stanford
- Dylan Swartz
- Jack van Coller
- Keegan Grant van Schalkwyk
- Glen Warner

tbc

- Luvuyo Madliki
- Luyolo Manentsa
- Cuma Mgijima
- Morné Eric Potgieter

Coach

- David McCallum

Port Elizabeth Police

Forwards

- Divan Barnard
- Wessel Ebersohn
- Ferdi Gerber
- Frans Gerber
- Quinton Haasbroek
- Hannes Huisamen
- Dwayne Kinghorn
- Lyle Lombard
- Francois Nel
- Darren Prins
- Ronald Scheckle
- Jeremy Sebia
- Leon Smith
- Wayne van Heerden
- Cornelius van Vuuren
- Lyle Walters
- Did not play:
- Dewald Barnard
- Raynard Fourie
- Elandré Smit
- Jean-Luke van Zyl
- Tiaan Vermaak

Backs

- Jaco Bernardo
- Eckard Jacobs
- Alwyn Jordaan
- Fabian Juries
- Elton Loxton
- Kevin Plaatjies
- Juan Smit
- Ruan Stander
- Monré van As
- Kyle Verwey
- Daantjie Vosloo
- Did not play:
- Andrew Burkett
- Danie le Roux
- Roger Louis
- Christo Memanie
- Marius Muller
- Petrus Jacobus Pretorius

tbc

- Johan Abraham Dyer
- Arno Ben Kleynhans
- Warren van Eck
- Chris Zeelie
- Dean Zonneveld

Coach

- Zane Bosch

Pretoria Police

Forwards

- Ruan Grobler
- Vince Gwavu
- Imille Keyser
- Hannes Ludik
- Nico Luus
- Dwight Pansegrouw
- Johan Pieterse
- Birtie Powell
- Jerry Sefoko
- Luga van Biljon
- Ian van Deventer
- Boris van Jaarsveld
- Rayno Wasserman
- Did not play:
- Hannes de Koker
- Gerhard du Preez
- Gerald Kruger
- Patrick Mathe
- Rinus Moulder
- Gerrit van Gerve
- Werner van Zweel

Backs

- Rikus de Beer
- Natal de Sousa
- Raynardt Honiball
- Dillon Laubscher
- Daron Liebenberg
- Johannes Motsepe
- Michael Nienaber
- Elvis Noludwe
- Heinrich Rademeyer
- Gaybrin Smith
- Nelis Snyman
- Pieter Strydom
- Hendrik van der Nest
- Strepies van Loo
- Ivan Venter
- Did not play:
- Divan Prinsloo
- Pieter van der Nest

tbc

- Quintis Anton Jansen van Vuuren
- Joachim Petrus Marnewick
- Jama Msongelwa
- Sarel Johannes Pienaar
- Ludwig Schmidt
- Anton Arno Snyman
- Kyle Stanley

Coach

- To be confirmed

Raiders

Forwards

- Henna Bredenkamp
- Gustav de Vos
- Daneel Ellis
- Ashalin Govindasamy
- André Hicks
- Velaphi Khumalo
- Ntsako Mlangheni
- Andile Mrwebi
- Sisonke Mtikitiki
- Gaven Nesindande
- Harold Primo
- Ben Sekgobela
- Sive Shasha
- Chezlin Snyders
- Dewald van Deventer
- Did not play:
- Jade Amod
- Courtney Jameson
- Aphiwe Mahlati
- Isaac Mbalo
- Gibson Mcoco
- Mkhululi Mkhize
- Gideon Muller
- Fidel Nyabusha

Backs

- Marceau Alberts
- Arno Coetzee
- Chris Juries
- Arafaat Kock
- Zunaid Kock
- Lincoln Koopman
- Tshepo Mooki
- Gardener Nechironga
- Chris Nqubuli
- Chanwille October
- Ronald Strydom
- Did not play:
- Lindley Anthony
- Bradley Jardine
- Ashley Miles
- Jama Ntengo
- Bradley Paulsen
- Ra-Iq Ploker
- Mbuyiselo Siqebengu
- Prince Sishi
- Sean Smit
- Dirkie Vlooh

tbc

- Allan Maboe
- Ricardo Elrico Muller
- Jaun van Blerk

Coach

- Fernando Penshaw

Rustenburg Impala

Forwards

- Morné Basson
- Paul Bester
- Johno de Klerk
- Zander de Kock
- Leon du Plessis
- Louis Hollamby
- Hendrik Huyser
- Victor Joubert
- Strand Kruger
- Bruce Muller
- Tiaan Nel
- Flippie Pienaar
- Robbie Rawlins
- Rynardt Steenkamp
- Justin Wheeler
- Gavin Williamson
- Did not play:
- Jacques Gnäde
- Ntokozo Mduduzi Mashele
- Petrus Cornelis Nel
- Henri Scharneck
- Solomzi Sotsaka

Backs

- Jermaine Apollis
- Wilco de Wet
- Mzuvukile Duma
- Cecil Dumond
- Morné Jooste
- Willie Kok
- Nico Kruger
- Stefan Kruger
- Dumisani Matyeshana
- Aubrey McDonald
- Joe Seerane
- Gysbert van Wyk
- Did not play:
- Simphiwe Mtimkulu
- Naas Olivier
- Justin St Jerry

To be confirmed

- Donovan Ricardo Arendse
- André Clarke Engelbrecht
- Johan Lodewyk Engelbrecht
- William James Joshua Finlay
- Dewaldt Jeanré Francois Havenga
- Marnitz Jacobs
- Jean-Pierre le Grange
- Siphiwe Johannes Mdoda
- Nqabisile Mnkani
- Quintin Mostert
- David Schalk Pieterse
- Cornelius Johannes Prinsloo
- Jan-Dirk Slippers
- Reon van der Merwe

Coach

- To be confirmed

Sishen

Forwards

- Anthony de Villiers
- Nico Graaff
- Danie Myburgh
- Leonard Poolman
- Kudu Pretorius
- Cornelius Prinsloo
- André Roberts
- Gummy Roux
- Joubert Steyn
- Nicolaas Steyn
- Renier Strydom
- Pieter van Aarde
- BW van Dyk
- Jamie Zwiegelaar
- Did not play:
- Arnold Coetzee
- Ruan Grobler
- Lyvette Shikwambana
- Herman Wepener

Backs

- Jovan Cookson
- Ryan de Wee
- Adolf du Plessis
- Sarel du Plessis
- Stewart Jacobs
- Tiaan le Roux
- Prince Mofokeng
- Thabang Molefe
- Hendrik Olivier
- Johan Peens
- Aubrené Tities
- Viljoen van der Linde
- Did not play:
- Christo Coetzee
- Brendon Coetzer
- Len le Roux
- Charlton McCarthy
- Stevie Meyer

To be confirmed

- Ulrich Blom
- Jacobus Gideon Johannes Coetzee
- Daryl Dawson
- Pieter Christiaan Voges Lategan
- Zane le Roux
- Wentzel Matthys
- Jakobus Michael Motlhale
- Johannes Nicolaas Peenze
- Jan Rossouw
- Willem Jacobus Schoeman
- Jarques Scholtz
- Bernardus Izak van der Merwe
- Willie Vermeulen
- William Viljoen
- Frederick Hendrik Zeeman

Coach

- Regardt Dreyer

Springs

Forwards

- Steven Boshoff
- Dowayn Botha
- Riaan Botha
- Ockert Brits
- Martiens du Plessis
- Pierre Foord
- Robin Howell
- Calvin Jantjes
- Shaun McGeer
- Garnett Parkin
- Francois Roux
- Chris Smit
- Anton van Deventer
- Did not play:
- Jotham Zakhele Khanye

Backs

- Everard Bye
- Clayton Carl Crause
- Dieter de la Port
- Kazlo Holtzhausen
- Monde Kinana
- Darren Brian Lindsay
- Strachen Nortjé
- Noel Rhodes
- Theo Rhodes
- Corné Uys
- Dawie van Nieuwenhuizen
- Wynand Venter
- Clifford Daniel Viljoen
- Johan Zondagh

To be confirmed

- Gary Arthur Bock
- Wian Engelbrecht
- Tiaan Koekemoer
- Khomotso Maphala Mokwele
- Kgosi Ngwenya
- Altus Stander
- Shawn Swanepoel
- Nicolaas Barend Puren van Wyk
- Marcelle Johnny Viljoen
- Jean Jacques Visser
- Adolf Johannes Vos

Coach

- Kobus van Rooyen

Villagers Worcester

Forwards

- Yrin Belelie
- Timothy John Beukes
- Morné Boshoff
- TC Botha
- Louis Carstens
- Ernst Hendrik Wolfaardt Claassen
- Ashley Peter Godfrey Dreyden
- André du Toit
- Martin Everson
- Jasherie Kariem
- Franklin Daniel Kuhn
- Cliven Malies
- Ansley Mervin Mouton
- Ronwynne Daniel Swanepoel
- Wayne Wilschut
- Did not play:
- Adriaan Botha
- Kenan Cronjé

Backs

- Cheslin Donovan Adams
- Givan Kyle Adams
- Lincolin Ryan Eksteen
- Kirwan Horsemend
- Shandro Issel
- Yazeed Johnson
- Ricardo Jones
- Juhandry Leroy Pieterse
- Nazeem Nilton van Sitters
- Jowayne van Wyk
- David Elton Wehr
- Girchen Wentzel
- Did not play:
- Nazeem de Sousa

To be confirmed

- Francois Daniller
- Eduardo Ashley Fourie
- Hirchel John Grove
- Jaundray Craig Jacobs
- Giovanne Earlan Morkel
- Ayanda Mpayipeli

Coach

- To be confirmed

Wanderers

Forwards

- Rory Anderson
- Shaun Campbell
- Brendon Matthew Cross
- Christo de Jager
- Gareth Fennell
- Anthony Gallacher
- Carl Gliddon
- Gary Mahlangu
- Jonathan Mallett
- Bheki Ndobe
- Stu Prior
- Dylan Rutherford
- Cameron Smith
- Jaques Stierlin
- Geoff Wood
- Nqubeko Zulu

Backs

- Richard Aingworth
- Kyle Dutton
- Wesley Flanagan
- Kewan Gibb
- Peter Owen Hemsley
- Clayton Kelly
- Craig Kolarik
- Azola Mda
- Sifiso Mgaga
- Menzi Sikhulile Ngidi
- Buntu Obose
- Ryan Odendaal
- Darryn Rentzke
- Nicolas van Rooyen
- Did not play:
- Wesley Roberts

To be confirmed

- Dewald Grundeling
- Christopher John Knezovich
- Jason Ray Kyte
- Shawn Lubbe
- Nsovo Shimange
- Nolan Francois van Staden
- Grant Victor
- Gareth Leonard Webster
- Brendan Patrick Whyte
- Sibusiso Samuel Zwane

Coach

- Neil Kalify

Welkom Rovers

Forwards

- Ivan de Klerk
- Marius Engelbrecht
- Johnny Fourie
- Lu-An Kleyngeld
- Gerhard Klopper
- Wayne Ludick
- Thembelani Mabomba
- Brummer Marais
- Donavan Nieuwenhuyzen
- Welile Ntozakhe
- LC van Tonder
- Willem van Staden
- Jean Volkwyn
- Fannie Zim
- Did not play:
- Quintin Davis

Backs

- Hein Bezuidenhout
- Jobrey Fortuin
- Jaco Jooste
- Patrick Kampher
- Shaun Nieuwenhuyzen
- Freddy Siyanda Ntuli
- Jaco Pretorius
- Wessel Pretorius
- Shaun Prins
- Tiaan van Wyk
- Ryno Venter
- Freddie Wepener
- Did not play:
- Robbie Ntlantsana
- Pieter Strydom

To be confirmed

- Steven Johan Breytenbach
- Nathaniel Coetzee
- Juan Davis
- Ruan de Klerk
- Tertius de Villiers
- Casper Asmanus Johannes Heymans
- Zillen Lamprecht
- Dillan Laurent
- Chejana Mallane
- Eon van Zyl

Coach

- Rassie Ras

Wesbank

Forwards

- Aston Claasen
- Nicholas Duhwa
- Gurshwin Dyason
- Emgee Fredericks
- Vincent Fredericks
- Arno Hendriks
- Melvin Laserus
- Petro Louw
- Morris Moses
- Jacquinn Ruthford
- Mario Samson
- Johan September
- Chadley Wenn
- Coenie Westraadt
- Did not play:
- Braison Albertus
- André Coetzee
- Stuart Halvorsen
- Westley Isaacs
- Alwyn Liebenberg
- Andre van Reenen

Backs

- Ronnie Appolis
- Salmon Coetzee
- Anvon Davids
- Sedwell Diedericks
- Brynn Michael Gericke
- Evan Liedeman
- Theodore Marinus
- Johannes Slabber
- Edwill Solomons
- Peter Solomons
- Anzo Stubbs
- Chrislyn van Schalkwyk
- Dashton Wellman
- Did not play:
- Franklin Barendse
- Marno Hart
- Rodville Bradley Jonkers
- Stallone Scott
- Anton Stander
- Etienne Swarts

To be confirmed

- Denzil Adams
- Donovan Andrew Adams
- Herman Adams
- Reduwan April
- Maxwell Bailey
- Adam George Barlow
- Llyle Ryan Bredenkamp
- Richard Thomas Daniels
- Joseph Dixon
- Nevin Edas
- Carlo Timm Erasmus
- Ernest Gavin Fredericks
- Pieter Stephanus Goosen
- Divan Gernic Green
- Birthrim Alviro Gysenberg
- Keegan Heinrich Kortje
- Brian Joseph Laserus
- Steven Lance Lategan
- Bronwin Lemonie
- Julrich Justin Liedeman
- Leighton Tesswin McQuire
- Christian Marlon Myburgh
- Dylan November
- Divan Bradley Roems
- Brandon Daniel Skippers
- Dillon Johannes Sono
- Ghriswin Swarts
- Christopher Leoroy Swartz
- Willem Petrus Jacobus Swiegers
- Francois Riaan Titus
- Devon George van Niekerk
- Christopher Peter Waldeck
- Wagheed Weideman
- Herchell Jowaan Wesso
- Warren Williams

Coach

- To be confirmed

Witbank Ferros

Forwards

- MC Botes
- Cole de Jager
- Izan Green
- Willem Kotze
- Theo Kruger
- Linda Masenya
- Willie Muller
- Sanza Ngwenya
- Dylan Pieterse
- Warren Shellnack
- Jackie Smit
- Werno Smit
- Hugo van der Merwe
- Willie van der Merwe
- Willem van Niekerk
- Edward Wallace
- Did not play:
- Joe Herrmann
- Jaco Marneweck
- Jean-Di Oosthuizen
- Brandon Snell
- Chris van Leeuwen

Backs

- Themba Bhengu
- Armand Botha
- Tommie Collen
- Kean Dry
- Christiaan Els
- Bennie Mashabane
- Gerhardus Munro
- Henson Ngozo
- Ruben Opperman
- Dewald Pieters
- Louis Roos
- Pule Sibiya
- Jannie van der Merwe
- Johan van der Walt
- Did not play:
- Jean Botha
- Wayne Dreyer
- Ruan du Plooy
- Mzwakhe Fransman
- Bernard Jansen van Vuuren
- Christo Nelson
- Jaun-dré Schmidt

To be confirmed

- Shane Agrella
- Siphesihle Barnabas
- Ruben Carelse
- Michael Chabant
- Jaco de Beer
- Devon Gibbons
- Dustin Edgar Hoffmann
- Neil Jansen van Rensburg
- Juan Kotze
- Thapelo Chris Maphome
- Petrus Prinsloo
- Nelius Snyman
- Christoffel Francois van der Merwe

Coach

- Willie Oosthuizen

=== Player statistics ===
The following table contain points which have been scored in the 2015 SARU Community Cup:

All 2015 SARU Community Cup point scorers
No	Player	Team	T	C	P	DG	Pts
1	Raymond Olivier	Durbanville-Bellville	2	18	13	0	85
2	Chris Micklewood	College Rovers	2	17	10	1	77
3	Monty Dumond	Hamiltons	2	18	9	0	73
4	Dillon Laubscher	Pretoria Police	1	21	6	1	68
5	Wilco de Wet	Rustenburg Impala	1	14	10	0	63
6	Leegan Moos	Evergreens	1	6	14	0	59
7	Dashton Wellman	Wesbank	0	15	8	1	57
8	Darryn Rentzke	Wanderers	3	12	3	0	48
9	Francois Nel	Despatch	2	11	4	0	44
10	Jannie van der Merwe	Witbank Ferros	1	9	6	0	41
11	Garth April	Durbanville-Bellville	4	4	4	0	40
11	Nazeem Nilton van Sitters	Villagers Worcester	3	8	3	0	40
13	Tiaan van Wyk	Welkom Rovers	0	9	7	0	39
14	Juan Smit	Port Elizabeth Police	2	9	3	0	37
15	Wesley Flanagan	Wanderers	7	0	0	0	35
15	Chris Jordaan	College Rovers	7	0	0	0	35
17	Arno Coetzee	Raiders	0	11	4	0	34
18	Brendon Cope	Durban Collegians	1	6	5	0	32
19	Chrislyn van Schalkwyk	Wesbank	6	0	0	0	30
19	Jano van Zyl	Hamiltons	5	1	1	0	30
21	Shane Vallender	Hamiltons	0	7	5	0	29
22	Tiaan le Roux	Sishen	0	6	4	1	27
23	Strepies van Loo	Pretoria Police	3	1	3	0	26
24	Salmon Coetzee	Wesbank	5	0	0	0	25
24	Morné Jooste	Rustenburg Impala	5	0	0	0	25
24	Willie Kok	Rustenburg Impala	2	6	1	0	25
24	Billy Mintoor	Despatch	5	0	0	0	25
28	Griffin Colby	Bloemfontein Crusaders	0	6	4	0	24
29	Earl Lewis	Hamiltons	4	1	0	0	22
29	Johan Zondagh	Springs	1	4	3	0	22
31	Brendon April	Durbanville-Bellville	4	0	0	0	20
31	Jody Burch	Hamiltons	4	0	0	0	20
31	Anvon Davids	Wesbank	4	0	0	0	20
31	Cecil Dumond	Rustenburg Impala	3	1	0	1	20
31	Chris Juries	Raiders	4	0	0	0	20
31	Kalvano King	Despatch	4	0	0	0	20
31	Rohan Kitshoff	Durbanville-Bellville	4	0	0	0	20
31	Craig Kolarik	Wanderers	2	5	0	0	20
31	Dumisani Matyeshana	Rustenburg Impala	4	0	0	0	20
31	Heinrich Rademeyer	Pretoria Police	4	0	0	0	20
31	Dylan Rutherford	Wanderers	4	0	0	0	20
31	Ian van Deventer	Pretoria Police	4	0	0	0	20
43	Duncan Campbell	Durban Collegians	0	6	2	0	18
43	Ricardo Jones	Villagers Worcester	3	0	1	0	18
43	Shaun Nieuwenhuyzen	Welkom Rovers	3	0	0	1	18
46	Richard Aingworth	Wanderers	3	0	0	0	15
46	Marceau Alberts	Raiders	3	0	0	0	15
46	Roy Bursey	Old Selbornians	3	0	0	0	15
46	Pierre Cronjé	Hamiltons	3	0	0	0	15
46	Selvyn Davids	Despatch	1	5	0	0	15
46	Kyle Dutton	Wanderers	3	0	0	0	15
46	Brendon Groenewald	Durban Collegians	3	0	0	0	15
46	Kyle Hartley	Durban Collegians	3	0	0	0	15
46	Evan Liedeman	Wesbank	3	0	0	0	15
46	Wayne Ludick	Welkom Rovers	3	0	0	0	15
46	Aubrey McDonald	Rustenburg Impala	3	0	0	0	15
46	Prince Mofokeng	Sishen	3	0	0	0	15
46	Jongi Nokwe	College Rovers	3	0	0	0	15
46	Chris Nqubuli	Raiders	3	0	0	0	15
46	Matt Phillips	College Rovers	3	0	0	0	15
46	Birtie Powell	Pretoria Police	3	0	0	0	15
46	Tiaan Radyn	Durbanville-Bellville	3	0	0	0	15
46	Louis Roos	Witbank Ferros	3	0	0	0	15
46	Dale Sabbagh	Old Selbornians	0	3	3	0	15
46	Jeremy Sebia	Port Elizabeth Police	3	0	0	0	15
46	Pule Sibiya	Witbank Ferros	3	0	0	0	15
46	Jaco Swanepoel	Despatch	3	0	0	0	15
46	Gert van der Merwe	Noordelikes	3	0	0	0	15
46	Hendrik van der Nest	Pretoria Police	3	0	0	0	15
46	Nicolas van Rooyen	Wanderers	3	0	0	0	15
46	Michael Vermaak	Despatch	3	0	0	0	15
46	Freddie Wepener	Welkom Rovers	3	0	0	0	15
73	Justin Peach	Despatch	1	3	1	0	14
74	Morné Labuschagne	Despatch	1	4	0	0	13
74	Theodore Marinus	Wesbank	0	5	1	0	13
76	Ryan Brown	Despatch	0	3	2	0	12
76	Zander Byleveldt	Noordelikes	0	3	2	0	12
78	Leon Mauer	Old Selbornians	1	3	0	0	11
78	André Roberts	Sishen	0	1	3	0	11
78	Sherwin Slater	Bloemfontein Crusaders	1	0	2	0	11
81	Algernon Andries	Bloemfontein Crusaders	2	0	0	0	10
81	Ronnie Appolis	Wesbank	2	0	0	0	10
81	Iewan Bartels	Hamiltons	2	0	0	0	10
81	Keelin Bastew	Durban Collegians	2	0	0	0	10
81	Paul Bester	College Rovers	2	0	0	0	10
81	Niel Cleghorn	Hamiltons	2	0	0	0	10
81	Angus Cleophas	Durbanville-Bellville	2	0	0	0	10
81	Tommie Collen	Witbank Ferros	2	0	0	0	10
81	Ashton Constant	Durbanville-Bellville	2	0	0	0	10
81	Basil de Doncker	Despatch	2	0	0	0	10
81	Natal de Sousa	Pretoria Police	2	0	0	0	10
81	Stephan Deyzel	Despatch	2	0	0	0	10
81	Leon du Plessis	Rustenburg Impala	2	0	0	0	10
81	Christiaan Els	Witbank Ferros	2	0	0	0	10
81	Francois Esterhuyzen	Hamiltons	2	0	0	0	10
81	Sebastian Ferreira	Hamiltons	2	0	0	0	10
81	Pierre Foord	Springs	2	0	0	0	10
81	Joseph Fortuin	Evergreens	2	0	0	0	10
81	Carl Gliddon	Wanderers	2	0	0	0	10
81	Ferdie Horn	Durban Collegians	2	0	0	0	10
81	Cameron Jacobs	Despatch	2	0	0	0	10
81	Fabian Juries	Port Elizabeth Police	2	0	0	0	10
81	TC Khoza	College Rovers	2	0	0	0	10
81	Curtis Kleinhans	Old Selbornians	2	0	0	0	10
81	Melvin Laserus	Wesbank	2	0	0	0	10
81	Elroy Ligman	Despatch	2	0	0	0	10
81	Scheepers Lubbe	Noordelikes	2	0	0	0	10
81	Nico Luus	Pretoria Police	2	0	0	0	10
81	Jonathan Mallett	Wanderers	2	0	0	0	10
81	Baldwin McBean	Despatch	2	0	0	0	10
81	Dumisani Meslane	Despatch	2	0	0	0	10
81	Tshepo Mooki	Raiders	2	0	0	0	10
81	Gerschwin Muller	Evergreens	2	0	0	0	10
81	Menzi Sikhulile Ngidi	Wanderers	0	5	0	0	10
81	Michael Nienaber	Pretoria Police	2	0	0	0	10
81	Dusty Noble	College Rovers	2	0	0	0	10
81	Alwyn Olivier	Noordelikes	1	1	1	0	10
81	Craig Pheiffer	Hamiltons	2	0	0	0	10
81	Gummy Roux	Sishen	2	0	0	0	10
81	Joe Seerane	Rustenburg Impala	2	0	0	0	10
81	Jerry Sefoko	Pretoria Police	2	0	0	0	10
81	Johan September	Wesbank	2	0	0	0	10
81	Blaine Tlhapane	Bloemfontein Crusaders	2	0	0	0	10
81	Gysbert van Wyk	Rustenburg Impala	2	0	0	0	10
81	Leslie Venton	Noordelikes	2	0	0	0	10
81	Luzanne Williams	Evergreens	2	0	0	0	10
81	Jamie Zwiegelaar	Sishen	2	0	0	0	10
128	Kyle Wilkinson	College Rovers	1	1	0	0	7
129	Armand Botha	Witbank Ferros	0	3	0	0	6
130	Rory Anderson	Wanderers	1	0	0	0	5
130	Jermaine Apollis	Rustenburg Impala	1	0	0	0	5
130	Brandon Backeberg	Durban Collegians	1	0	0	0	5
130	Morné Basson	Rustenburg Impala	1	0	0	0	5
130	Greg Bauer	Durban Collegians	1	0	0	0	5
130	Yrin Belelie	Villagers Worcester	1	0	0	0	5
130	Bradley Birkholtz	Old Selbornians	1	0	0	0	5
130	Steven Boshoff	Springs	1	0	0	0	5
130	Alconray Botha	Durbanville-Bellville	1	0	0	0	5
130	Chesney Botha	College Rovers	1	0	0	0	5
130	Riaan Botha	Springs	1	0	0	0	5
130	TC Botha	Villagers Worcester	1	0	0	0	5
130	Alvin Brandt	Bloemfontein Crusaders	1	0	0	0	5
130	Enver Brandt	Bloemfontein Crusaders	1	0	0	0	5
130	Louis Carstens	Villagers Worcester	1	0	0	0	5
130	Ernst Hendrik Wolfaardt Claassen	Villagers Worcester	1	0	0	0	5
130	Brandon Colby	Bloemfontein Crusaders	1	0	0	0	5
130	Jovan Cookson	Sishen	1	0	0	0	5
130	Roan Dalzell	College Rovers	1	0	0	0	5
130	Gustav de Vos	Raiders	1	0	0	0	5
130	Ryan de Wee	Sishen	1	0	0	0	5
130	Danwel Demas	Durbanville-Bellville	1	0	0	0	5
130	Sedwell Diedericks	Wesbank	1	0	0	0	5
130	Adolf du Plessis	Sishen	1	0	0	0	5
130	Martiens du Plessis	Springs	1	0	0	0	5
130	Nicholas Duhwa	Wesbank	1	0	0	0	5
130	Billy Dutton	Old Selbornians	1	0	0	0	5
130	Wade Elliott	College Rovers	1	0	0	0	5
130	Henk Franken	Hamiltons	1	0	0	0	5
130	Vincent Fredericks	Wesbank	1	0	0	0	5
130	Frans Gerber	Port Elizabeth Police	1	0	0	0	5
130	Graham Geldenhuys	College Rovers	1	0	0	0	5
130	Izan Green	Witbank Ferros	1	0	0	0	5
130	Vince Gwavu	Pretoria Police	1	0	0	0	5
130	Francois Hanekom	Hamiltons	1	0	0	0	5
130	Dustin Hoffmann	Noordelikes	1	0	0	0	5
130	Andrew Holland	Durban Collegians	1	0	0	0	5
130	Marnus Hugo	Durbanville-Bellville	1	0	0	0	5
130	Hendrik Huyser	Rustenburg Impala	1	0	0	0	5
130	Shandro Issel	Villagers Worcester	0	1	1	0	5
130	Alwyn Jordaan	Port Elizabeth Police	1	0	0	0	5
130	Victor Joubert	Rustenburg Impala	1	0	0	0	5
130	Patrick Kampher	Welkom Rovers	1	0	0	0	5
130	Jasherie Kariem	Villagers Worcester	1	0	0	0	5
130	Imille Keyser	Pretoria Police	1	0	0	0	5
130	Elrich Kock	Despatch	1	0	0	0	5
130	Willem Kotze	Witbank Ferros	1	0	0	0	5
130	Jason Kriel	Durbanville-Bellville	1	0	0	0	5
130	Stefan Kruger	Rustenburg Impala	1	0	0	0	5
130	Dyllan Lamprecht	Despatch	1	0	0	0	5
130	Marlon Lewis	Despatch	1	0	0	0	5
130	Daron Liebenberg	Pretoria Police	1	0	0	0	5
130	Karl Liebenberg	Durbanville-Bellville	1	0	0	0	5
130	Elton Loxton	Port Elizabeth Police	1	0	0	0	5
130	Hannes Ludik	Pretoria Police	1	0	0	0	5
130	Lesley Luiters	Despatch	1	0	0	0	5
130	Siviwe Magaba	Despatch	1	0	0	0	5
130	Renier Marais	Durbanville-Bellville	1	0	0	0	5
130	Bennie Mashabane	Witbank Ferros	1	0	0	0	5
130	Azola Mda	Wanderers	1	0	0	0	5
130	Simthandile Memese	Noordelikes	1	0	0	0	5
130	Sifiso Mgaga	Wanderers	1	0	0	0	5
130	Sangoni Mxoli	College Rovers	1	0	0	0	5
130	Gardener Nechironga	Raiders	1	0	0	0	5
130	Tiaan Nel	Rustenburg Impala	1	0	0	0	5
130	Morgan Newman	Hamiltons	1	0	0	0	5
130	Saneliso Ngoma	Old Selbornians	1	0	0	0	5
130	Henson Ngozo	Witbank Ferros	1	0	0	0	5
130	Mondli Nkosi	Durban Collegians	1	0	0	0	5
130	Elvis Noludwe	Pretoria Police	1	0	0	0	5
130	Strachen Nortjé	Springs	1	0	0	0	5
130	Jacques Oosthuizen	Hamiltons	1	0	0	0	5
130	Anvor Prins	Evergreens	1	0	0	0	5
130	Shaun Prins	Welkom Rovers	1	0	0	0	5
130	Gareth Reece-Edwards	Durban Collegians	1	0	0	0	5
130	Deroy Rhoode	Evergreens	1	0	0	0	5
130	Jannie Rossouw	Old Selbornians	1	0	0	0	5
130	Calvin Sacks	Durban Collegians	1	0	0	0	5
130	Luciando Santos	College Rovers	1	0	0	0	5
130	Ben Sekgobela	Raiders	1	0	0	0	5
130	Johannes Slabber	Wesbank	1	0	0	0	5
130	Werno Smit	Witbank Ferros	1	0	0	0	5
130	Gaybrin Smith	Pretoria Police	1	0	0	0	5
130	Tapiwa Tsomondo	Hamiltons	1	0	0	0	5
130	Anton van Deventer	Springs	1	0	0	0	5
130	Greg van Jaarsveld	Hamiltons	1	0	0	0	5
130	LC van Tonder	Welkom Rovers	1	0	0	0	5
130	Trichardt van Tonder	Despatch	1	0	0	0	5
130	Jowayne van Wyk	Villagers Worcester	1	0	0	0	5
130	Sias van Wyk	Noordelikes	1	0	0	0	5
130	Ivan Venter	Pretoria Police	1	0	0	0	5
130	Kyle Verwey	Port Elizabeth Police	1	0	0	0	5
130	Wickus Visser	Noordelikes	1	0	0	0	5
130	Daantjie Vosloo	Port Elizabeth Police	1	0	0	0	5
130	Lyle Walters	Port Elizabeth Police	1	0	0	0	5
130	Rayno Wasserman	Pretoria Police	1	0	0	0	5
130	Douw Wessels	Durbanville-Bellville	1	0	0	0	5
130	Marius White	Durbanville-Bellville	1	0	0	0	5
130	Gavin Williamson	Rustenburg Impala	1	0	0	0	5
130	Wayne Wilschut	Villagers Worcester	1	0	0	0	5
130	Geoff Wood	Wanderers	1	0	0	0	5
231	Kazlo Holtzhausen	Springs	0	2	0	0	4
231	Dane Sherratt	Durbanville-Bellville	0	2	0	0	4
231	Jeandre Small	College Rovers	0	2	0	0	4
232	Morné Morolong	Bloemfontein Crusaders	0	0	1	0	3
233	Chanwille October	Raiders	0	1	0	0	2
233	Kevin Plaatjies	Port Elizabeth Police	0	1	0	0	2
233	Pieter Strydom	Pretoria Police	0	1	0	0	2
233	Arno Venter	Noordelikes	0	1	0	0	2
233	JP Vermeulen	Noordelikes	0	1	0	0	2
—	penalty try	Raiders	1	0	0	0	5
* Legend: T = Tries, C = Conversions, P = Penalties, DG = Drop Goals, Pts = Points.

== Referees ==
The following referees officiated matches in the 2015 SARU Community Cup:

- Rodney Boneparte
- Johre Botha
- Renie Coetzee
- Ruaan du Preez
- Stephan Geldenhuys
- AJ Jacobs
- Cwengile Jadezweni
- Jason Jaftha
- Jaco Kotze
- Pieter Maritz
- Ruhan Meiring
- Paul Mente
- Godwill Morebe
- Vusi Msibi
- Jacques Nieuwenhuis
- Sindile Ngcese
- Tahla Ntshakaza
- Francois Pretorius
- Jaco Pretorius
- Khotso Raleting
- Oregopotse Rametsi
- Egon Seconds
- Archie Sehlako
- Fernando Uithaler
- Ricus van der Hoven
- Lourens van der Merwe
- Renier Vermeulen
