= Marnus =

Marnus is a masculine given name. Notable people with the name include:

- Marnus Hugo (born 1986), South African rugby union player
- Marnus Labuschagne (born 1994), Australian cricketer
- Marnus Potgieter (born 1999), South African rugby union player
- Marnus Schoeman (born 1989), South African rugby union player
- Marnus van der Merwe (born 1997), South African rugby union player
