= Chris Micklewood =

South African rugby union player

- Full name: Christopher Ian Micklewood
- Born: 14 March 1987 (age 39) Durban, South Africa
- Height: 1.86 m (6 ft 1 in)
- Weight: 90 kg (14 st 2 lb; 198 lb)
- School: Westville Boys' High School
- University: Varsity College

Rugby union career
- Position: Fly-half / Fullback
Youth career
- 2004–2008: Sharks
Amateur team(s)
Years	Team	Apps	(Points)
2013–2015	College Rovers	18	(123)
Senior career
Years	Team	Apps	(Points)
2007	Sale Sharks	0	(0)
2007	Macclesfield	5	(15)
2008	London Scottish	9	(62)
2008–2009	Brive	0	(0)
2009–2010	Newcastle Falcons	1	(0)
2010	Boland Cavaliers	4	(4)
- Correct as of 7 April 2015
International career
Years	Team	Apps	(Points)
2005	South Africa Schools		
- Correct as of 27 March 2015

Christopher Ian Micklewood (born 14 March 1987 in Westville, KwaZulu-Natal, South Africa) is a former rugby union player. He was a utility back and played for Macclesfield, London Scottish and Newcastle Falcons in England, Brive in France, and the Boland Cavaliers in South Africa between 2007 and 2010. He also spent 10 years at KwaZulu-Natal club side College Rovers, playing over 200 games, including 18 in the SARU Community Cup between 2013 and 2015.

Micklewood was raised in Durban and educated at Westville Boys' High School, where he was Head of School in 2005 and went on to represent the South African Schools side.

He spent a loan period at Sale Sharks in the latter half of 2007, turning out for their Jets team, but making no appearances for the first team, instead playing for Macclesfield in the 2007–08 National Division Three North where he made five appearances. In 2008, he played for London Scottish in the 2007–08 National Division Three South, making nine appearances.

He then joined French side Brive, where he played for their espoirs (youth) team, but failed to make an appearance for their senior squad. He then signed for Newcastle Falcons at the start of the 2009–10 Guinness Premiership season, but made just one appearance for them in the 2009–10 European Challenge Cup.

He returned to South Africa in 2010, where he made four appearances for the Boland Cavaliers in the 2010 Currie Cup First Division.

He then joined KwaZulu-Natal club side College Rovers, which he represented in the SARU Community Cup in 2013, 2014, and 2015 before retiring from the sport.
