= Brendon Groenewald =

South African rugby union player

- Born: 27 May 1991 (age 35) Johannesburg, South Africa
- Height: 1.97 m (6 ft 5 1/2 in)
- Weight: 115 kg (18 st 2 lb; 254 lb)
- School: Glenwood High School, Durban
- University: Central University of Technology, Bloemfontein

Rugby union career
- Position: Flanker / Number eight / Lock
- Current team: Durban Collegians
Youth career
- 2007–2009: Sharks
- 2010–2011: Free State Cheetahs
- 2012: Sharks
Amateur team(s)
Years	Team	Apps	(Points)
2013–present	Durban Collegians	4	(15)
Senior career
Years	Team	Apps	(Points)
2011	Free State Cheetahs	8	(10)
2012	Sharks (Currie Cup)	2	(0)
2014	Free State Cheetahs	1	(0)
- Correct as of 30 March 2015
- Correct as of 26 August 2014

Brendon Groenewald (born 27 May 1991 in Johannesburg, South Africa) is a South African rugby union player, currently playing with KwaZulu-Natal club side Durban Collegians. He is a utility forward that can play as a lock, flanker or number eight.

== Career ==
=== School rugby ===
At high school level, Groenewald represented KwaZulu-Natal in provincial youth weeks in three consecutive years – he played for them at the Under-16 Grant Khomo Week in 2007, the Under-18 Academy Week competition in 2008 and the Under-18 Craven Week competition in 2009.

=== Free State Cheetahs ===
In 2010, he moved to Bloemfontein, where he joined the Free State Cheetahs academy. He made just seven starts for the Free State U19 side during the 2010 Under-19 Provincial Championship before he was promoted to the Free State U21 side, for whom he made five appearances in 2010 and scoring three tries, including two in their match against Boland U21.

He made his first class debut in 2011; he was included in the Free State XV squad for the 2011 Vodacom Cup and was included in the run-on side for their opening match of the season against the Falcons. It proved to be a memorable debut, as he also scored his first senior try in the final minutes of the match as his side ran out 55–19 winners. He started their first five matches of the competition (scoring one more try against Namibian side Welwitschias) and played off the bench in their next two matches, as well as the quarter-final, where the Free State XV were knocked out by eventual winners, Argentinean side Pampas XV.

He returned to Under-21 action in the second half of 2011, scoring two tries in nine starts for the Free State U21 side in the 2011 Under-21 Provincial Championship.

=== Sharks / Durban Collegians ===
In 2012, Groenewald returned to KwaZulu-Natal when he joined the Sharks. He made two appearances for them during the 2012 Vodacom Cup competition. Still eligible to play at Under-21 level, he played in all thirteen of the Sharks U21s' matches during the 2012 Under-21 Provincial Championship, scoring three tries as they reached the semi-final of the competition.

He played club rugby for Durban Collegians in the 2013 Moor Cup, helping them to second place in the league and went one better in the 2014 Moor Cup when he was the top try-scorer in the league to help them win the title and qualify for the 2015 SARU Community Cup.

=== Return to Free State Cheetahs ===
His performances for Durban Collegians didn't go unnoticed and Free State Cheetahs Rory Duncan brought him back to Bloemfontein as lock and loose-forward cover during the 2014 Currie Cup Premier Division season. Groenewald made his Currie Cup debut by coming off the bench in the Cheetahs' 37–20 victory over the Eastern Province Kings in Round Seven of the competition.

=== Durban Collegians ===
In 2015, Groenewald returned to Durban to rejoin club side Durban Collegians prior to their 2015 SARU Community Cup campaign.
