= Jovelian de Koker =

South African rugby union player

- Born: 28 February 1992 (age 34) Worcester, South Africa
- Weight: 74 kg (11 st 9 lb; 163 lb)
- School: Worcester Gymnasium

Rugby union career
- Position: Center
- Current team: Marmande
Youth career
- 2011–2013: Boland Cavaliers
Amateur team(s)
Years	Team	Apps	(Points)
2013	Villagers Worcester	4	(10)
Senior career
Years	Team	Apps	(Points)
2014–2021	Boland Cavaliers	62	(20)
2018–2020	Marmande	23	(20)
2020–2021	Bassin D'Arcachon	4	(0)
2021–	Marmande	17	(20)
- Correct as of 27 March 2022

Jovelian de Koker (born 28 February 1992) is a South African rugby union player for Marmande in Fédérale 1 in France. His regular position is scrum-half.

== Career ==
=== Youth / Club rugby ===
De Koker's first provincial selection came when he appeared for the Wellington-based Boland U19 side during the 2011 Under-19 Provincial Championship. He made two appearances from the bench as they finished in fifth place in Group B, outside the play-off spots.

In 2012, De Koker made five appearances for Boland U21 in the 2012 Under-21 Provincial Championship. However, it was another disappointing season and Boland finished sixth on the log. They won just one match all season, a 30–12 victory over Griffons U21, one of three matches that De Koker started during the season.

At the start of 2013, De Koker represented Villagers Worcester in the inaugural edition of the SARU Community Cup competition. He started all four matches and scored consolation tries in their matches against Despatch and College Rovers, but Villagers finished in fourth spot and failed to qualify for the finals. He once again represented Boland U21 in the 2013 Under-21 Provincial Championship, making six starts and three appearances from the bench. A much-improved performance from Boland saw them finish in second spot in the league to qualify for the semi-finals, helped by tries from De Koker in their matches against Limpopo Blue Bulls U21 in Bela-Bela and Pumas U21 in Nelspruit. In their semi-final match against the Limpopo Blue Bulls, De Koker scored two tries to help them to a 25–22 win and a final appearance, but he could not prevent them slipping to a 19–59 defeat to Eastern Province U21 in the final.

=== Senior career ===
De Koker made the step up to the senior side and made his first class debut for the Boland Cavaliers during the 2014 Vodacom Cup competition, appearing as a replacement in their 8–16 defeat to Western Cape rivals Western Province. He made a further three appearances from the bench as Boland finished in sixth spot, missing out on the semi-finals.

De Koker didn't feature in the 2014 Currie Cup qualification series – during which Boland failed to qualify for the 2014 Currie Cup Premier Division – but he did make his Currie Cup debut in the 2014 Currie Cup First Division, coming on as a replacement in their 19–27 defeat to the Griffons in Wellington. He made his first Currie Cup start in their next match against the Leopards in Potchefstroom and repaid the selectors' faith in him by scoring a try in the 36th minute, but still ended on the losing side, with the Leopards winning the match 54–32. He made two more starts and one appearance off the bench, but once again missed out on the play-offs, by one point to eventual finalists Falcons.

De Koker began the 2015 Vodacom Cup as first-choice scrum-half for the Boland Cavaliers, starting their first three matches of the campaign.
