= Francois Esterhuyzen =

- Born: 16 November 1994 (age 31) Somerset West, South Africa
- Height: 1.87 m (6 ft 1 1/2 in)
- Weight: 104 kg (229 lb; 16 st 5 lb)
- School: Hoërskool Overberg / Tygerberg High School

Rugby union career
- Position: Hooker
- Current team: Enisei-STM
Youth career
- 2010–2012: Boland Cavaliers
- 2013–2015: Western Province
Amateur team(s)
Years	Team	Apps	(Points)
2014–2015	Hamiltons		
Senior career
Years	Team	Apps	(Points)
2016–2019	Boland Cavaliers	39	(15)
2019-2021	CSKA Moscow	13	(30)
2021-2022	Dinamo Moscow	13	(35)
2022–present	Enisei-STM	24	(220)
- Correct as of 22 October 2022
International career
Years	Team	Apps	(Points)
2012	South Africa Schools	1	(0)
- Correct as of 22 July 2018

Francois Esterhuyzen (born 16 November 1994) is a South African rugby union player for the Enisei-STM in the Russian Rugby Championship. His regular position is hooker.

== Rugby career ==
Esterhuyzen was born in Somerset West. He represented the Boland Cavaliers at high school level, culminating in a call-up to the South Africa Schools squad in 2012. He made one appearance for the team, in a match against Wales in the 2012 Under-18 International Series.

He then moved to Cape Town to join the Western Province academy, where he played at youth level, as well as representing club side Hamiltons in the 2014 and 2015 editions of the Community Cup.

He returned to the Boland Cavaliers for the 2016 season, and made his first class debut for the side in their match against the Eastern Province Kings in Round Two of the 2016 Currie Cup qualification series. He helped the Boland Cavaliers to third spot in the competition, securing a place in the 2016 Currie Cup Premier Division. He made his Currie Cup debut in August 2016 – again, in a Round Two match against the Eastern Province Kings – eventually making six appearances in South Africa's premier domestic competition.
