= Wendal Wehr =

South African rugby union player

- Full name: Wendal Peter Wehr
- Born: 27 December 1987 (age 38) Worcester, South Africa
- Height: 1.98 m (6 ft 6 in)
- Weight: 102 kg (16 st 1 lb; 225 lb)
- School: Worcester Secondary School
- University: Boland College of Education / University of Johannesburg
- Notable relative: Gurshwin Wehr (brother)

Rugby union career
- Position: Flanker / Winger
- Current team: Griquas
Youth career
- 2007–2008: Boland Cavaliers
Amateur team(s)
Years	Team	Apps	(Points)
2010–2012	UJ	16	(10)
2013–2014	Rustenburg Impala	7	(10)
2014	Villagers Worcester		
Senior career
Years	Team	Apps	(Points)
2008–2009	Boland Cavaliers	16	(10)
2012	Leopards	2	(0)
2014–present	Griquas	68	(70)
- Correct as of 8 July 2019

Wendal Peter Wehr (born 27 December 1987 in Worcester, South Africa) is a South African rugby union player for Griquas in the Currie Cup and in the Rugby Challenge. He mostly plays as a flanker, but he has also occasionally played as a winger.

== Career ==
=== Youth ===
At youth level, Wehr represented the Boland U21 side in the 2007 and 2008 editions of the Under-21 Provincial Championship.

=== Boland Cavaliers ===
He made his first class debut for the Wellington-based Boland Cavaliers during the 2008 Vodacom Cup competition, coming on as a substitute in their match against the Free State XV in Bloemfontein, which ended in a 35–20 defeat for the Cavaliers.

He made his Currie Cup debut five months later during the 2008 Currie Cup Premier Division, playing off the bench against the Blue Bulls in Pretoria in a 69–19 defeat.

He was more regularly involved during the 2009 Currie Cup Premier Division competition – he was included in the run-on side for ten of their matches during the season and also made a further three appearances off the bench. This was also the season that saw Wehr being employed as a winger instead of his normal position as a flanker, starting three matches of the regular season on the left wing. He also scored his first senior try when he got a try in the final minute of their 31–23 defeat to Griquas. His second senior try for Boland came a few weeks later in the promotion/relegation series against the Pumas. He scored to help his side to a 36–35 victory in Wellington, but that ultimately proved to futile as a 40–3 victory in the return leg in Witbank saw the Pumas promoted to the Premier Division at the Cavaliers' expense.

=== Varsity Cup rugby ===
Wehr left the Cape Winelands to move to Johannesburg, where he joined university side UJ. He played for them in three consecutive Varsity Cup competitions, in 2010, 2011 and 2012. He made sixteen appearances for them during the three seasons, helping them reach the semi-finals of the competition in 2011 and 2012.

=== Leopards ===
In the latter half of 2012, Wehr then made the move to Potchefstroom, where he joined the Leopards for the 2012 Currie Cup First Division. He made two appearances, a 23–20 defeat to the Eastern Province in the final match of the pool stages, as well as a 50–27 defeat to the same opposition in the semi-final of the competition the following week.

=== Club rugby ===
During his time in North West province, Wehr played his club rugby for Rustenburg Impala. He was a member of their side as they qualified for the first two editions of the SARU Community Cup. He made two appearances in the 2013 SARU Community Cup, scoring one try in their match against Bloemfontein Crusaders as they reached the semi-finals where they lost to eventual winners Despatch. Five appearances followed in the 2014 SARU Community Cup, with Wehr scoring one try in the quarter-finals against Roses United as they went all the way in the competition, becoming champions by beating Roodepoort in the final, with Wehr playing the whole match.

He then returned to his hometown of Worcester, where he played for Villagers Worcester in the 2014 Boland Premier League.

=== Griquas ===
During the 2014 Currie Cup Premier Division, Kimberley-based side Griquas announced that they contracted Wehr for the 2015 season. However, an injury crisis at Griquas saw his arrival being expedited as he was named on the bench for their final match of the season against the Blue Bulls in Pretoria.
