= Rohan Kitshoff =

Namibia international rugby union player

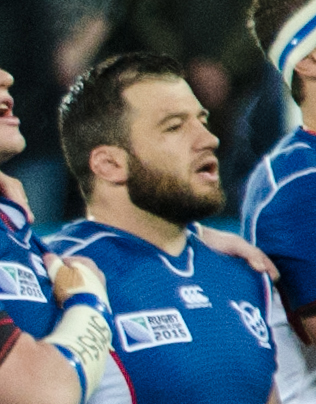
- Born: 13 September 1985 (age 41) Windhoek, South West Africa (now Namibia)
- Height: 1.82 m (5 ft 11 1/2 in)
- Weight: 98 kg (216 lb; 15 st 6 lb)
- School: HTS Drostdy, Worcester
- University: Cape Peninsula University of Technology

Rugby union career
- Position: Flanker
- Current team: Welwitschias
Youth career
- 2001–2003: Boland Cavaliers
- 2006: Western Province
Amateur team(s)
Years	Team	Apps	(Points)
2015	Durbanville-Bellville	6	(20)
Senior career
Years	Team	Apps	(Points)
2006–2007	Western Province	0	(0)
2007–2010	Griquas	59	(60)
2011–2012	Western Province	15	(35)
2012–2013	Bordeaux	8	(0)
2013–2014	Stormers	2	(0)
2013–2014	Western Province	18	(30)
2016–present	Welwitschias	24	(20)
- Correct as of 26 June 2018
International career
Years	Team	Apps	(Points)
2010–present	Namibia	44	(110)
- Correct as of 14 September 2019

Rohan Kitshoff (born 13 September 1985) is a Namibian professional rugby union player, currently playing with Western Province Premier League club side Durbanville-Bellville. His regular position is flanker.

== Career ==
He played youth rugby for Boland Cavaliers before joining Western Province. He left them without making a first class appearance however and joined Griquas in 2007, where he became a regular.

In 2011, he returned to Western Province to play Vodacom Cup rugby for them, as well as making five Currie Cup appearances. He was the joint top try scorer in the 2012 Vodacom Cup, scoring seven tries.

He joined French Top 14 team Bordeaux for the 2012–13 Top 14 season, but returned to South Africa to play for Western Province once again. A few weeks later, he was also included in the Stormers' team against the Reds during the 2013 Super Rugby season.

=== Durbanville-Bellville ===
In 2015, he joined Western Province club side Durbanville-Bellville and was a member of the squad that won the 2015 SARU Community Cup competition, scoring four tries in six appearances in the competition.

== International ==
He competed with Namibia at the 2011 Rugby World Cup where he played in four matches. He made his international debut in 2010.
