= Robbie Harris =

South African rugby union player

- Full name: Robert Lee Harris
- Born: 30 March 1982 (age 44) Durban, South Africa
- Height: 1.79 m (5 ft 10 1/2 in)
- Weight: 115 kg (18 st 2 lb; 254 lb)
- School: Glenwood High School

Rugby union career
- Position: Prop
- Current team: Durban Collegians
Amateur team(s)
Years	Team	Apps	(Points)
2015–present	Durban Collegians	4	(0)
Senior career
Years	Team	Apps	(Points)
2006–2008	Sharks (Currie Cup)	33	(5)
2008–2009	Nottingham RFC		
2009–2010	Leicester Tigers	6	(0)
2010–2011	Saint-Étienne	4	(0)
2011–2013	Sharks (Currie Cup)	7	(5)
- Correct as of 30 March 2015
- Correct as of 30 March 2015

Robbie Harris (born 30 March 1982 in Durban, South Africa) is a rugby union prop, currently playing for KwaZulu-Natal club side Durban Collegians.

He previously played for Leicester Tigers in the Guinness Premiership and before that for the Sharks in the Currie Cup competition and Nottingham RFC in National Division One.
