= Villagers Worcester =

South African rugby union club, based in Worcester, Western Cape

(South Africa) Villagers Worcester
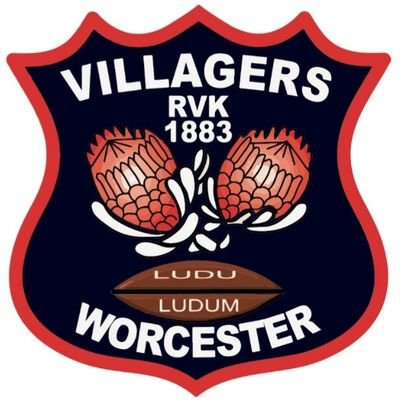
- Full name: Villagers Worcester Rugby Football Club
- Union: Boland Rugby Union
- Founded: 1883; 143 years ago
- Region: Breede Valley
- Ground: Boland Park (Capacity: 10000)
- Director of Rugby: Elroy Daames
- Captain: Henrico van Wyk
- Leagues: Sanlam Boland Top12 and Gold Cup

Official website
- twitter.com/villagers_worc
- Current season

Villagers Worcester Rugby Football Club known for sponsorship reasons as MULTISURE VILLAGERS WORCESTER or by their nickname "Villa" is an Amateur and Community Rugby Club, based at Boland Park Stadium in Worcester, Western Cape Province of South Africa. The Club holds membership of the Boland Rugby Union and can provide players to the Boland Cavaliers.

== Origins ==
The club was founded in 1883 in Worcester and is one of the oldest rugby clubs in South Africa and the oldest from a formerly disadvantaged community.

== Achievements ==
- 2012: Villagers Worcester's sevens team won the Boland Union Provincial sevens tournament. Villagers Worcester won the Boland Premier League title in 2012 and represented the union in the inaugural SARU Community Cup competition in 2013, where they finished fourth in Pool A and failed to qualify to the finals tournament in George.
- 2014: Villagers Worcester once again win the 2014 Boland Premier League to qualify for the 2015 edition of the SARU Community Cup.
- 2015: Villagers Worcester beat WESBANK in the final op the Boland Top 8 to clinch the top prize in Boland rugby making them Back-to-back Champions for the first time in their history.
- 2018: Villagers Worcester beat defending Champions Roses United 36-29 in a tense final with a last minute try by replacement winger Elton Valla. Roses still lead 19-17 at halftime but Villagers Worcester took control in the second half to clinch their fourth Boland Club rugby title.
- 2024: Villagers Worcester made it to the 2024 Boland Top 12 final in a losing effort to arch-rivals Robertson Town going down 31-29 however by reaching the final they qualify for the 2025 Goldcup tournament.

== Club honours ==
Villager Worcester have won the Sanlam Boland Top 12 four times in 2012,2014,2015 and 2018.

== Notable members ==
Six players from Villagers had the honour of wearing the green and gold of SARU: Johnny Neethling, Isak Neethling, Abe Felix, Maurice Hankey, Christy Noble and Charles January. Other former notable players include Lindsey Eksteen, John Vergotini, Yashrie Karriem, Jovelian De Koker. The clubs most capped player is Moggamat Faeez "Fazli" Isaacs. Wayne Julies who was a part of the 2007 Rugby world cup squad also represented the club.

In 1931, Schalk du Toit and Alvi van der Merwe were selected to tour with Bennie Osler's Springbok side to the United Kingdom with Van der Merwe playing in the test against Wales. His son Johan became Boland captain and later played for Villagers Worcester. Patrick Marran a South African politician who served as a Member of the Western Cape Provincial Parliament for the African National Congress from May 2019 until May 2024 and is the current Boland Rugby Union vice-president also represented the club in the nineties.

Wendal Wehr, who played for Griquas, made his return to the club in 2024 and lead them to the final of the Sanlam Boland top 12 in a losing effort to Robertson Town .

Gurshwin Africa scrumhalf of the club won the 2024 Sanlam Boland Top 12 Confident player of the Tournament.

== See also ==
- Boland Cavaliers
- South African Rugby Union
- List of South African rugby union teams
- Gold Cup

== Sources ==
- Theron, Paul; de Jong, A.L. (1990). Boland Rugby 50: die Eerste Halfeeu [Boland Rugby 50: the first half-century] (in Afrikaans). Bolandse Rugby-Voetbalunien.
- Various articles from the Worcester Standard and Advertiser
- Greyvenstein, Chris (1989). Springbok Saga: 100 Years of Springbok Rugby. Don Nelson. ISBN 9781868060573.
