= Dumisani Matyeshana =

South African rugby union player

- Born: 11 February 1981 (age 45) Mdantsane, East London, South Africa
- Height: 1.86 m (6 ft 1 in)
- Weight: 92 kg (14 st 7 lb; 203 lb)
- School: Selborne College
- University: Border Tech

Rugby union career
- Position: Winger / Centre
- Current team: Rustenburg Impala
Youth career
- 2002: Border Bulldogs
- 2003: Eastern Province Elephants
Amateur team(s)
Years	Team	Apps	(Points)
2014–present	Rustenburg Impala	14	(25)
Senior career
Years	Team	Apps	(Points)
2004–2006	Border Bulldogs	31	(55)
2007	Leopards	8	(25)
2007–2008	Sharks (Currie Cup)	5	(7)
2009	Border Bulldogs	13	(5)
2010–11, 2013–present	Leopards	26	(50)
2013	Leopards	2	(0)
- Correct as of 7 April 2015

Dumisani Matyeshana (born 11 February 1981 in East London) is a South African rugby union player for club side Rustenburg Impala. He plays as a winger, centre or full-back and previously played provincial rugby for the Border Bulldogs, Sharks and Leopards.
