= Henk Franken =

Namibian rugby union player

- Full name: Hendrik Hermanus Franken
- Born: 16 January 1987 (age 39) Stellenbosch, South Africa
- Height: 1.96 m (6 ft 5 in)
- Weight: 110 kg (17 st 5 lb; 243 lb)
- School: Charlie Hofmeyr High School, Ceres

Rugby union career
- Position: Lock
- Current team: Hamiltons
Youth career
- 2005–2007: Boland Cavaliers
Amateur team(s)
Years	Team	Apps	(Points)
2014–present	Hamiltons	13	(5)
Senior career
Years	Team	Apps	(Points)
2011	Welwitschias	4	(0)
- Correct as of 7 April 2015
International career
Years	Team	Apps	(Points)
2011–2012	Namibia	3	(0)
- Correct as of 30 March 2015

Hendrik Hermanus Franken (born 16 January 1987) is a Namibian rugby union player. He competed with the Namibian national team at the 2011 Rugby World Cup where he played in one match.
