= Marnus Hugo =

South African rugby union player

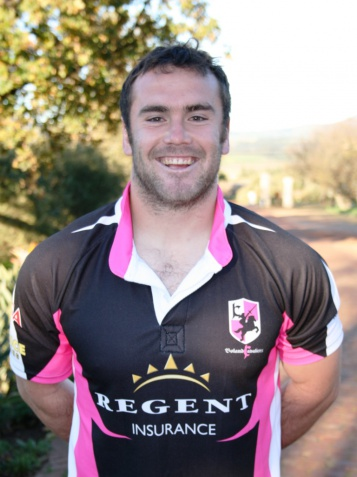
- Full name: Abraham Pieter Marnus Hugo
- Born: 24 September 1986 (age 40) Paarl, South Africa
- Height: 1.69 m (5 ft 6 1/2 in)
- Weight: 82 kg (12 st 13 lb; 181 lb)
- School: Paarl Gimnasium

Rugby union career
- Position: Scrum Half
- Current team: Boland Cavaliers
Youth career
- 2005: Sharks
- 2006–2007: Boland Cavaliers
Amateur team(s)
Years	Team	Apps	(Points)
2015	Durbanville-Bellville	7	(5)
Senior career
Years	Team	Apps	(Points)
2006–2009	Boland Cavaliers	27	(20)
2010–2013	Griquas	57	(5)
2010	Cheetahs	2	(0)
2011	→ Boland Cavaliers	5	(0)
2014–2016	Boland Cavaliers	44	(5)
- Correct as of 9 October 2016

Abraham Pieter Marnus Hugo (born 24 September 1986) is a former South African rugby union footballer whose regular position was scrum-half. He made just under a hundred first class appearances between 2006 and 2013 for the Boland Cavaliers and Griquas and also made two appearances for the Cheetahs during the 2010 Super 14 season.

He initially retired after the 2013 Currie Cup season, but returned to action for the Boland Cavaliers in the 2014 Vodacom Cup competition. After playing another three seasons for the Wellington-based side, he retired at the end of the 2016 season.

== Durbanville-Bellville ==
In 2015, he joined Western Province club side Durbanville-Bellville and was a member of the squad that won the 2015 SARU Community Cup competition, scoring one try in seven appearances in the competition.
