= Paul Bester =

South African cricketer (born 1974)

Personal information
- Born: 5 October 1974 (age 52); Johannesburg, South Africa
- Source: Cricinfo, 17 December 2020

Paul Bester (born 5 October 1974) is a South African cricketer. He played in one first-class and one List A match for Eastern Province in 1993/94.

== See also ==
- List of Eastern Province representative cricketers
