= Gold Cup (rugby union) =

South African rugby union competition

- Formerly: SARU Community Cup
- Sport: Rugby union
- Founded: 2013
- First season: 2013
- No. of teams: 20
- Countries: South Africa, Namibia, Zimbabwe
- Most recent champion: Naka Bulle
- Most titles: Rustenburg Impala (2)
- Broadcaster: Supersport
- Sponsor: Pick n Pay

The Gold Cup is the premier rugby union club competition in South Africa for non-university teams.

The competition was launched as the SARU Community Cup in 2013 to replace the existing SARU National Club Championships and renamed to the Gold Cup for 2016, when teams from Namibia and Zimbabwe were also included in the competition.

== History ==
The SARU Community Cup logo

On 20 September 2012, the South African Rugby Union announced the launch of the SARU Community Cup to replace the National Club Championships. The inaugural edition started in February 2013. Several rugby union clubs in South Africa are affiliated to universities, which already competed in the annual Varsity Rugby tournaments. The Community Cup was created as a national competition for non-university clubs.

After three seasons during which the matches were played over the Easter weekend, it was rebranded as the Gold Cup, moved to a timeslot later in the year and also included teams from Namibia and Zimbabwe.

== Format ==
Each season, twenty teams qualify for the Gold Cup from the club leagues of the fourteen provincial unions in South Africa. In addition, the Blue Bulls Limpopo sub-union also entered a team every year and from 2016 onwards, the champions of the Namibian and Zimbabwean club competitions would also enter. The defending champions of the Gold Cup would automatically qualify to the next edition. Each of the provincial unions would nominate a team which would automatically qualify for the competition – it is dependent on the rules of the individual league whether this will be the team that finishes top of the log during the round-robin stage of the competition or the title play-off winner. All university teams are ineligible and would be excluded from participation.

In addition to the automatic qualifiers, the remainder of the participating teams would consist of wildcard entries. For 2013 and 2014, teams were nominated to enter a wildcard draw, but from 2015 onwards a play-off competition was introduced, where the second-best eligible teams from the provincial unions could play off for the remaining spots.

The format of the Gold Cup is the same as the Rugby World Cup. The teams are divided into four pools, each containing five teams. They then play four pool games, playing every other teams in their respective pools once. Each team plays two home games and two away games.

The winner and runner-up of each pool enter the play-off stage, held at a neutral venue over the Easter long weekend each year. The play-offs consist of quarter finals, semi-finals and the final. The winner of each pool meets the runner-up of a different pool in the quarter-final. The winner of each quarter-final goes on to the semi-finals and the semi-final winners to the Cup final. The losing semi-finalists play each other in the 3rd-place play-off. The losing quarter finalists meet in the Plate semi-final, the winners of which will play in the Plate final, with the losers playing in the 7th-place play-off.

== Sponsorship ==
The sponsored version of the logo

In February 2013, it was announced that mobile phone provider Cell C would sponsor the SARU Community Cup for three seasons, with the tournament being known as the Cell C Community Cup.

== Teams ==
The teams that participated in the Gold Cup and their finishing positions are as follows:

SARU Community / Gold Cup participants
Team	Union	Community Cup			Gold Cup	
Team	Union	2013	2014	2015	2016	2017
African Bombers	Eastern Province	12	—N/a	—N/a	—N/a	—N/a
Bloemfontein Crusaders	Free State	15	10	15	—N/a	—N/a
Bloemfontein Police	Free State	20	—N/a	—N/a	18	10
Boksburg	Falcons	—N/a	15	—N/a	—N/a	—N/a
Brakpan	Falcons	3	9	—N/a	4	—N/a
Bridgton	SWD	—N/a	17	—N/a	—N/a	—N/a
Centurion	Blue Bulls	—N/a	7	—N/a	—N/a	—N/a
College Rovers	Kwa-Zulu Natal	2	4	6	6	2
Despatch	Eastern Province	1	5	4	—N/a	—N/a
Durban Collegians	Kwa-Zulu Natal	—N/a	—N/a	9	14	—N/a
Durbanville-Bellville	Western Province	5	—N/a	1	3	—N/a
East London Police	Border	—N/a	—N/a	—N/a	16	—N/a
Evergreens	SWD	8	—N/a	12	7	—N/a
False Bay	Western Province	—N/a	—N/a	—N/a	2	1
Hamiltons	Western Province	—N/a	3	3	—N/a	—N/a
Mossel Bay Barbarians	SWD	—N/a	14	—N/a	—N/a	—N/a
Noordelikes	Limpopo Blue Bulls	19	19	19	—N/a	—N/a
Northam Rhinos	Limpopo Blue Bulls	—N/a	—N/a	—N/a	17	8
Old Georgians	Zimbabwe	—N/a	—N/a	—N/a	13	9
Old Selbornians	Border	10	8	10	11	17
Pirates	Golden Lions	—N/a	—N/a	—N/a	10	—N/a
Port Elizabeth Police	Eastern Province	—N/a	—N/a	17	8	—N/a
Progress (George)	SWD	—N/a	—N/a	—N/a	—N/a	6
Progress (Uitenhage)	Eastern Province	—N/a	—N/a	—N/a	—N/a	11
Pretoria Police	Blue Bulls	6	—N/a	5	5	—N/a
QBR	Blue Bulls	—N/a	—N/a	—N/a	—N/a	3
Raiders	Golden Lions	9	—N/a	11	—N/a	15
Roodepoort	Golden Lions	7	2	—N/a	—N/a	—N/a
Roses United	Boland	13	6	—N/a	—N/a	12
Rustenburg Impala	Leopards	4	1	2	1	4
Sasol	Mpumalanga	—N/a	—N/a	—N/a	—N/a	7
Sishen	Griquas	17	11	16	9	16
SK Walmers	Western Province	11	—N/a	—N/a	—N/a	—N/a
Spring Rose	Eastern Province	—N/a	12	—N/a	—N/a	—N/a
Springs	Falcons	—N/a	—N/a	18	—N/a	—N/a
Swallows	Border	—N/a	—N/a	—N/a	—N/a	14
Tygerberg	Western Province	—N/a	—N/a	—N/a	—N/a	5
Vaal Reefs	Leopards	—N/a	—N/a	—N/a	—N/a	20
Vereeniging	Falcons	—N/a	—N/a	—N/a	—N/a	13
Villagers Worcester	Boland	16	—N/a	13	19	—N/a
Wanderers	Golden Lions	—N/a	—N/a	7	—N/a	—N/a
Welkom	Griffons	—N/a	20	—N/a	—N/a	19
Welkom Rovers	Griffons	14	13	20	15	—N/a
Wesbank	Boland	—N/a	18	8	—N/a	—N/a
Western Suburbs	Namibia	—N/a	—N/a	—N/a	—N/a	18
White River	Mpumalanga	18	—N/a	—N/a	20	—N/a
Windhoek Wanderers	Namibia	—N/a	—N/a	—N/a	12	—N/a
Witbank Ferros	Mpumalanga	—N/a	16	14	—N/a	—N/a

- The top eight teams are ranked by the results of the finals tournament. Teams 9 to 20 are ranked by their final log position in the pool stages.
- N/A indicates the team did not qualify to the relevant edition of the Gold Cup.
- (Q) indicates the team qualified to the next edition of the Gold Cup.

== See also ==
- South African Rugby Union
- Varsity Rugby
