= Durban Collegians =

Durban Collegians is a sports club based at Kings Park Stadium in Durban, South Africa. The club is over 100 years old and has produced many of the country's top sportspeople including rugby Springbok captain, Wynand Claassen. South Africa international rugby union player François Steyn is contracted to the club.

It includes the following sports

- Rugby
- Cricket
- Hockey
- Bowls
