= 2016 Gold Cup (rugby union) =

Rugby union season

- Countries: South Africa, Namibia and Zimbabwe
- Date: 10 September – 29 October 2016
- Champions: Rustenburg Impala (2nd title)
- Runners-up: False Bay
- Matches played: 47
- Tries scored: 395 (average 8.4 per match)
- Top point scorer: Cecil Dumond (102)
- Top try scorer: Tythan Adams (10)

The 2016 Gold Cup was the fourth season of the Gold Cup competition, but the first season that it was known as the Gold Cup, having previously been known as the Community Cup. The tournament was the top competition for non-university rugby union clubs in South Africa, Namibia and Zimbabwe.

While previous editions of the competition were held over the Easter weekend, the 2016 tournament took place later in the year, with the matches in the competition taking place between 10 September and 29 October 2016. Also, the champion clubs from Namibia and Zimbabwe took part in the competition for the first time.

The competition was won by Rustenburg Impala for the second time in three years; they beat False Bay 48–24 in the final played on 29 October 2016.

== Competition rules and information ==
The format of the Gold Cup was the same as the Rugby World Cup. The teams were divided into four pools, each containing five teams. They then played four pool games, playing other teams in their respective pools once. Each team played two home games and two away games.

The winner and runner-up of each pool entered the play-off stage, which consisted of quarter finals, semi-finals and the final. The winner of each pool met the runner-up of a different pool in a quarter final, at the home venue of the pool winner. The winner of each quarter-final progressed to the semi-finals and the semi-final winners to the final, which was held at the home venue of the finalist with the best record in the pool stages.

== Qualification ==
The highest-placed non-university clubs in the 2015 season of each of the fifteen provincial unions' club leagues, as well as defending champions Durbanville-Bellville all qualified for the 2016 Gold Cup competition.

To cater for the switching the tournament from the first half of the year to the second half, all non-university clubs that won their leagues in the 2016 season qualified to a playoff for two additional spots in the 2016 Gold Cup. These play-offs matches were:

Round One	20 August 2016	Centurion (Blue Bulls)	24–15	Wesbank (Boland)	Centurion
	15:00

Round One	20 August 2016	College Rovers (KwaZulu-Natal)	32–16	Raiders (Golden Lions)	Durban
	15:00

Round One	20 August 2016	Gardens (Eastern Province)	17–24	East London Police (Border)	Uitenhage
	15:00

Round One	20 August 2016	Vaal Reefs (Leopards)	18–17	Potgietersrus (Blue Bulls Limpopo)	Klerksdorp
	15:00

Round Two	27 August 2016	Vaal Reefs (Leopards)	23–32	East London Police (Border)	Klerksdorp
	15:30

Round Two	27 August 2016	Centurion (Blue Bulls)	37–40	College Rovers (KwaZulu-Natal)	Centurion
	15:30

== Teams ==
The following teams qualified for the 2016 Gold Cup:

Location of teams in the 2016 Gold Cup
South Africa
2016 Gold Cup (rugby union) is located in South Africa
Gauteng	Western Cape
2016 Gold Cup (rugby union) is located in Gauteng	2016 Gold Cup (rugby union) is located in Western Cape
Namibia	Zimbabwe
2016 Gold Cup (rugby union) is located in Namibia	2016 Gold Cup (rugby union) is located in Zimbabwe
Teams in Pool A, Pool B, Pool C and Pool D

=== Team listing ===
Team	Sponsored Name	Union	Pool
Bloemfontein Police	Bloemfontein Police	Free State	Pool D
Brakpan	Siyaya Brakpan	Valke	Pool C
College Rovers	Your Communications College Rovers	KwaZulu-Natal	Pool A
Durban Collegians	SA Home Loans Durban Collegians	KwaZulu-Natal	Pool C
Durbanville-Bellville	Durbanville-Bellville	Western Province	Pool A
East London Police	East London Police	Border	Pool D
Evergreens	Evergreens	SWD	Pool B
False Bay	Direct Axis False Bay	Western Province	Pool C
Northam Rhinos	Northam Platinum Rhinos	Limpopo Blue Bulls	Pool B
Old Georgians	Old Georgians	Zimbabwe	Pool C
Old Selbornians	Mike Pendock Motors Old Selbornians	Border	Pool A
Pirates	Pirates	Golden Lions	Pool B
Port Elizabeth Police	Don's Pawn Shop Port Elizabeth Police	Eastern Province	Pool D
Pretoria Police	Pretoria Police	Blue Bulls	Pool D
Rustenburg Impala	Rustenburg Impala	Leopards	Pool B
Sishen	Belaz Sishen	Griquas	Pool D
Villagers Worcester	Onelogix United Bulk Villagers Worcester	Boland	Pool A
Windhoek Wanderers	FNB Windhoek Wanderers	Namibia	Pool B
Welkom Rovers	Tiger Wheel & Tyre Welkom Rovers	Griffons	Pool A
White River	White River	Mpumalanga	Pool C

== Pool Stages ==
In the draw made in February 2016, the twenty teams were drawn in four pools.

=== Pool A ===
The final log of the 2016 Gold Cup Pool A is:

2016 Gold Cup Pool A standings
Pos	Team	P	W	D	L	PF	PA	PD	TF	TA	TB	LB	Pts
1	Durbanville-Bellville	4	4	0	0	171	83	+88	23	10	3	0	19
2	College Rovers	4	3	0	1	157	88	+69	25	10	3	1	16
3	Old Selbornians	4	2	0	2	87	94	−7	11	13	1	1	10
4	Welkom Rovers	4	1	0	3	93	124	−31	11	18	1	1	6
5	Villagers Worcester	4	0	0	4	74	193	−119	10	29	1	0	1

Legend and competition rules
Legend:
Top two teams; qualified to the quarter-finals.	P = Games played, W = Games won, D = Games drawn, L = Games lost, PF = Points for, PA = Points against, PD = Points difference, TF = Tries for, TA = Tries against, TB = Try bonus points, LB = Losing bonus points, Pts = Log points
Competition rules:
Play-offs: The top two teams qualified to the quarter-finals, where the pool winner hosted a runner-up from another pool. Points breakdown: * 4 points for a win * 2 points for a draw * 1 bonus point for a loss by seven points or less * 1 bonus point for scoring four or more tries in a match

The following matches were played in the 2016 Gold Cup Pool A:

==== Round one ====
10 September 2016	Villagers Worcester	29–39	Welkom Rovers	Boland Park, Worcester
14:45	Try: Curtley Timm 44'; Nazeem Nilton van Sitters 48'; Lincolin Ryan Eksteen 63'; Jasherie Karriem 68'; Con: Clayton Isaacs 45', 49' (2/2); Yazeed Johnson 69' (1/2); Pen: Clayton Isaacs 13' (1/3); Cards: Jowayne van Wyk (yellow card) 15' to 26'	Scoreboard	Try: Gerhard Klopper 15'; Jaco Pretorius 25', 39', 55'; Con: Tiaan van Wyk 25', 55' (2/4); Pen: Tiaan van Wyk 6', 31', 32', 47', 59' (5/5); Drop: Tiaan van Wyk (0/1); Cards: Gert Petrus Jacobus Luwes (yellow card) 43' to 53'	Referee: Divan Uys

10 September 2016	Durbanville-Bellville	40–14	Old Selbornians	Durbanville-Bellville Rugby Club
15:30	Try: Roderick Moses 16'; Denzel Willemse 43'; Brenden Esterhuizen 59'; Ashton Constant 64'; Cheslyn Roberts 66'; Con: Tiaan Radyn 17', 60', 65' (3/5); Pen: Tiaan Radyn 1', 4', 28' (3/3); Cards: Brenden Esterhuizen (red card) 70'	Scoreboard	Try: Dylan Pieterse 13'; Joshua Bassingthwaite 33'; Con: Leon Andrew Mauer 14', 34' (2/2); Pen: Leon Andrew Mauer (0/2); Cards: Bradley Birkholtz (yellow card) 45'; Dylan Pieterse (yellow card) 52'; Duran Alberts (yellow card) 58' to 68'	Referee: Nathan Barry

Bye/s: College Rovers

==== Round two ====
17 September 2016	College Rovers	53–10	Villagers Worcester	KP2, Kings Park, Durban
12:30	Try: Matt Phillips 3'; Michael Scheepers 5'; Chris Jordaan 19'; Jarrett Crouch 22'; Willem Rheeder 25'; Jandré Jacobs 30', 53', 72'; Tythan Adams 55'; Con: Matt Phillips 20', 23' (2/6); Gavin Scott 56', 73' (2/3)	Scoreboard	Try: Gurshwin Africa 43'; Jasherie Karriem 63'; Con: Yazeed Johnson (0/2); Pen: Jasherie Karriem (0/1)	Referee: Johre Botha

17 September 2016	Welkom Rovers	24–32	Durbanville-Bellville	Welkom Rovers Rugby Club, Welkom
15:30	Try: Curtis Kleinhans 54', 65'; Jovanian du Preez 71'; Con: Tiaan van Wyk 55', 66', 72' (3/3); Pen: Tiaan van Wyk 2' (1/2); Cards: Shaun Nieuwenhuyzen (yellow card) 77'	Scoreboard	Try: Daneel Botes 10'; Roderick Moses 34'; Conway Pretorius 38'; Michael Badenhorst 46'; Con: Tiaan Radyn 11', 39', 47' (3/4); Pen: Tiaan Radyn 31', 74' (2/3); Cards: Jacques Vermaak (yellow card) 33' to 43'; Ashton Constant (yellow card) 56' to 66'	Referee: Griffon Colby

Bye/s: Old Selbornians

==== Round three ====
24 September 2016	Old Selbornians	27–12	Villagers Worcester	Kempston Park, East London
15:30	Try: Joshua Bassingthwaite 17'; Duran Alberts 36'; Buhle Mikhail Ntsebeza 47'; Bradley Birkholtz 69'; Con: Craig Shone 18', 70' (2/4); Pen: Craig Shone 32' (1/2); Cards: Craig Green (yellow card) 75'	Scoreboard	Try: Lincolin Ryan Eksteen 28'; Jowayne van Wyk 80'; Con: Clayton Isaacs 29' (1/1); Nazeem Nilton van Sitters (0/1); Cards: Morné Boshoff (yellow card) 61' to 71'; Franklin Daniel Kuhn (yellow card) 63' to 73'	Referee: JP Clements

24 September 2016	Welkom Rovers	22–48	College Rovers	Welkom Rovers Rugby Club, Welkom
15:30	Try: LC van Tonder 54'; Jackson Chabeli 60'; Ruan Olivier 80'; Con: Shaun Nieuwenhuyzen (0/1); Tiaan van Wyk 61', 81' (2/2); Pen: Tiaan van Wyk (0/3); Shaun Nieuwenhuyzen 37' (1/1); Cards: Tiaan van Wyk (yellow card) 32' to 42'; Gerhard Klopper (yellow card) 34' to 46'	Scoreboard	Try: Willem Rheeder 3'; Chris Jordaan 20'; Lwazi Ngcungama 33'; Tythan Adams 41', 63', 76', 78'; Le Roux Viljoen 68'; Con: Gavin Scott 21', 34', 42', 77' (4/8); Cards: Mesuli Mncwango (yellow card) 54' to 64'; Matt Phillips (yellow card) 80'	Referee: Darren Colby

Bye/s: Durbanville-Bellville

==== Round four ====
1 October 2016	College Rovers	34–31	Old Selbornians	KP3, Kings Park, Durban
15:30	Try: Chris Jordaan 1'; Tythan Adams 24'; Matt Phillips 30'; Jason Kankowski 37'; Jandré Jacobs 75'; Con: Matt Phillips 25', 31', 38' (3/5); Pen: Matt Phillips 67' (1/1); Cards: Warren Randall (yellow card) 12' to 24'	Scoreboard	Try: Craig Green 57'; Roy Bursey 59'; Joshua Bassingthwaite 78'; Con: Reinhardt Gerber 60', 79' (2/3); Pen: Reinhardt Gerber 5', 13', 45', 49' (4/7); Cards: Dylan Pieterse (yellow card) 72'	Referee: Mike Adamson

1 October 2016	Villagers Worcester	23–74	Durbanville-Bellville	Boland Park, Worcester
15:30	Try: Nazeem Nilton van Sitters 17', 37'; Con: Clayton Isaacs 18', 38' (2/2); Pen: Clayton Isaacs 2', 25', 33' (3/3)	Scoreboard	Try: Angus Cleophas 7'; Conway Pretorius 12'; Andrew Picoto 21'; Michael Badenhorst 26', 73'; Daneel Botes 29' penalty try 35'; Gideon Thiart 42'; Brenden Esterhuizen 49'; Etienne Swarts 54'; Arend Brink 59'; Jacques Vermaak 69'; Con: Tiaan Radyn 8', 13', 36' (3/7); Angus Cleophas 50', 55', 70', 74' (4/5)	Referee: Blake Beattie

Bye/s: Welkom Rovers

==== Round five ====
8 October 2016	Durbanville-Bellville	25–22	College Rovers	Durbanville-Bellville Rugby Club
15:00	Try: Etienne Swarts 30'; Angus Cleophas 78'; Con: Raymond Olivier (0/1); Tiaan Radyn (0/1); Pen: Tiaan Radyn 17', 54', 63', 71', 73' (5/6); Cards: Tiaan Radyn (yellow card) 22' to 33'	Scoreboard	Try: Tythan Adams 42', 80'; Chris Kemp 67'; Con: Matt Phillips 43' (1/2); Gavin Scott 81' (1/1); Pen: Matt Phillips 13' (1/1)	Referee: Darren Colby

8 October 2016	Old Selbornians	15–8	Welkom Rovers	Kempston Park, East London
15:00	Try: Duran Alberts 5'; Buhle Mikhail Ntsebeza 64'; Con: Craig Shone 6' (1/2); Pen: Craig Shone 28' (1/2); Cards: Joshua Bassingthwaite (yellow card) 50' to 60'	Scoreboard	Try: Gerhard Klopper 78'; Con: Tiaan van Wyk (0/1); Pen: Tiaan van Wyk 8' (1/1); Cards: Ruan Olivier (red card) 71'	Referee: Nathan Swartz

Bye/s: Villagers Worcester

=== Pool B ===
The final log of the 2016 Gold Cup Pool B is:

2016 Gold Cup Pool B standings
Pos	Team	P	W	D	L	PF	PA	PD	TF	TA	TB	LB	Pts
1	Rustenburg Impala	4	4	0	0	194	99	+95	30	14	4	0	20
2	Evergreens	4	3	0	1	116	122	−6	16	17	3	0	15
3	Pirates	4	2	0	2	141	142	−1	16	20	2	1	11
4	Windhoek Wanderers	4	1	0	3	152	154	−2	23	21	4	1	9
5	Northam Rhinos	4	0	0	4	107	193	−86	15	28	2	1	3

Legend and competition rules
Legend:
Top two teams; qualified to the quarter-finals.	P = Games played, W = Games won, D = Games drawn, L = Games lost, PF = Points for, PA = Points against, PD = Points difference, TF = Tries for, TA = Tries against, TB = Try bonus points, LB = Losing bonus points, Pts = Log points
Competition rules:
Play-offs: The top two teams qualified to the quarter-finals, where the pool winner hosted a runner-up from another pool. Points breakdown: * 4 points for a win * 2 points for a draw * 1 bonus point for a loss by seven points or less * 1 bonus point for scoring four or more tries in a match

The following matches were played in the 2016 Gold Cup Pool B:

==== Round one ====
10 September 2016	Northam Rhinos	19–46	Rustenburg Impala	Northam Rugby Club, Northam
15:30	Try: Danie Loots 13'; Johannes Harmzen 23'; Whelan Fortuin 74'; Con: Danie Loots (0/1); Patrick Hattingh 24', 75' (2/2); Cards: Patrick Hattingh (yellow card) 53' to 62'	Scoreboard	Try: Leon du Plessis 20'; Gysbert van Wyk 31'; Justin Wheeler 38'; Bruce Muller 44'; Dumisani Matyeshana 65'; Aubrey McDonald 68'; Mzivukile Duma 77'; Con: Cecil Dumond 21', 32', 45', 78' (4/6); Justin St Jerry (0/1); Pen: Cecil Dumond 9' (1/1)	Referee: Eduan Nel

10 September 2016	Pirates	28–26	Windhoek Wanderers	Pirates Rugby Club, Greenside
15:30	Try: penalty try 34'; Dudley Stead 38'; Martin Scheepers 66'; Con: Christiaan Pieter Visser 35', 39' (2/3); Pen: Christiaan Pieter Visser 12', 19', 75' (3/5); Cards: Sheldon Williamson (yellow card) 45'; Johannes Janse van Rensburg (red card) 70'	Scoreboard	Try: Mahco Prinsloo 29'; Enem Kritzinger 42'; Jamie Joseph 47'; Morné Rupert Prenn 80'; Con: Mahco Prinsloo 30', 43', 48' (3/4); Cards: Kudu Botha (yellow card) 32' to 43'; Silvano Beukes (yellow card) 63'	Referee: Johre Botha

Bye/s: Evergreens

==== Round two ====
17 September 2016	Evergreens	10–29	Rustenburg Impala	Pacaltsdorp Sports Ground, Pacaltsdorp
15:30	Try: Freginald Africa 72'; Con: Leegan Moos 73' (1/1); Pen: Leegan Moos 23' (1/3)	Scoreboard	Try: Leon du Plessis 31'; Bruce Muller 43'; Cecil Dumond 52', 62'; Aubrey McDonald 55'; Con: Cecil Dumond 32', 44' (2/4); Pen: Cecil Dumond (0/1)	Referee: Sinethemba Mrulwa

17 September 2016	Pirates	51–24	Northam Rhinos	Pirates Rugby Club, Greenside
15:30	Try: Chris Newman 5', 31'; Bryce Nicholson-Deh 25', 34'; Jacques Swart 50'; Sheldon Williamson 63'; Con: Hanco Deale 6', 26', 32', 35', 51', 64' (6/6); Pen: Hanco Deale 3', 29', 39' (3/3); Cards: Sheldon Williamson (yellow card) 79'	Scoreboard	Try: Christopher Juries 20', 68'; Willem Botha 59'; Con: Patrick Hattingh 21', 60', 69' (3/3); Pen: Patrick Hattingh 9' (1/1)	Referee: JD de Meyer

Bye/s: Windhoek Wanderers

==== Round three ====
24 September 2016	Evergreens	35–31	Pirates	Pacaltsdorp Sports Ground, Pacaltsdorp
15:30	Try: Duwayne Smart 13', 51'; Leegan Moos 18', 80'; Buran Parks 32'; Con: Leegan Moos 52' (1/4); Lee-Roy Pojie 33' (1/1); Pen: Leegan Moos 26', 69' (2/3); Cards: Leegan Moos (yellow card) 29' to 39'; Arden-Lee Wesso (yellow card) 44' to 54'; Alroy Louis (yellow card) 46' to 56'	Scoreboard	Try: Sheldon Terblanché 23'; Dudley Stead 38'; Jacques Swart 65'; Con: Hanco Deale 39', 66' (2/3); Pen: Hanco Deale 29', 35', 42', 71' (4/4); Cards: Jama Ntengo (yellow card) 77'	Referee: Nathan Barry

24 September 2016	Windhoek Wanderers	60–29	Northam Rhinos	Wanderers Club, Windhoek
15:30	Try: Kudu Botha 9'; Alberto Engelbrecht 24'; Schalk Bergh 35'; Lean Stoop 37', 52', 74'; Francois Wiese 46'; DG Wiese 62'; Theo Coetzee 67'; Con: Mahco Prinsloo 25', 36', 38', 47', 53', 63' (6/9); Pen: Mahco Prinsloo 3' (1/1); Cards: AJ de Klerk (yellow card) 29' to 39'; DG Wiese (yellow card) 63' to 72'; Theo Coetzee (yellow card) 74'; Rohan Kitshoff (yellow card) 74'	Scoreboard	Try: Danie Loots 43', 58', 78'; Dieter Marquardt 50'; Con: Patrick Hattingh 44', 51', 59' (3/3); Danie Loots (0/1); Pen: Patrick Hattingh 12' (1/1); Cards: Tyson Mulamba (yellow card) 29' to 39' (red card) 74'; Stephan Jacobs (yellow card) 63' to 72'	Referee: Jacky Husselman

Bye/s: Rustenburg Impala

==== Round four ====
1 October 2016	Northam Rhinos	35–36	Evergreens	Northam Rugby Club, Northam
15:30	Try: Jacques Hattingh 1'; Hughwinn Majiedt 3', 22'; Patrick Hattingh 20'; Christopher Juries 37'; Con: Patrick Hattingh 2', 4', 21', 23', 38' (5/5); Pen: Patrick Hattingh (0/2)	Scoreboard	Try: Duwayne Smart 12', 75'; Lee-Roy Pojie 15'; Gideon Lambrechts 34'; Divandré Strydom 44'; Freginald Africa 58'; Con: Leegan Moos 13', 45', 76' (3/6)	Referee: Johre Botha

1 October 2016	Rustenburg Impala	62–39	Windhoek Wanderers	Rustenburg Impala Rugby Club, Rustenburg
15:30	Try: Louis Hollamby 12'; Nico Kruger 24', 71'; Leon du Plessis 28', 78'; Bruce Muller 38'; Justin Wheeler 48', 74'; Tiaan Nel 57'; JP le Grange 69'; Con: Cecil Dumond 13', 58' (2/6); Gysbert van Wyk 29' (1/1); David van Biljon 72', 75', 79' (3/3); Cards: JP le Grange (yellow card) 80'	Scoreboard	Try: Riaan van Zyl 18'; Gert Lotter 34', 53'; Malcolm Moore 41'; Alberto Engelbrecht 44'; Tershwin Raubenheimer 59'; Con: Riaan van Zyl 19', 45', 60' (3/3); Heinrich Smit (0/3); Pen: Riaan van Zyl 8' (1/1)	Referee: Oregopotse Rametsi

Bye/s: Pirates

==== Round five ====
8 October 2016	Rustenburg Impala	57–31	Pirates	Rustenburg Impala Rugby Club, Rustenburg
13:30	Try: Maverick van der Merwe 1'; Xolani Isaac Nkosi 10', 49'; Nico Kruger 26', 76'; Aubrey McDonald 46'; Leon du Plessis 51'; Dumisani Matyeshana 57'; Con: Cecil Dumond 11', 27', 47', 50', 52' (5/6); David van Biljon 58', 77' (2/2); Pen: Cecil Dumond 35' (1/1); Cards: Hendrik Huyser (yellow card) 37' to 48'; Justin Wheeler (yellow card) 40' to 50'	Scoreboard	Try: Sheldon Williamson 5'; Jacques Swart 60', 65'; Ben Sekgobela 72'; Con: Chanley Williams 6', 61', 66', 73' (4/4); Pen: Chanley Williams 40' (1/3)	Referee: Paul Mente

8 October 2016	Windhoek Wanderers	27–35	Evergreens	Wanderers Club, Windhoek
15:00	Try: Lean Stoop 13'; Alberto Engelbrecht 36'; Tershwin Raubenheimer 51'; Edwardo Nell 71'; Con: Mahco Prinsloo 14', 52' (2/4); Pen: Mahco Prinsloo 58' (1/1)	Scoreboard	Try: Clint Miller 31'; Buran Parks 53'; Freginald Africa 65', 74'; Con: Leegan Moos 54', 66', 75' (3/4); Pen: Leegan Moos 12', 22', 47' (3/3)	Referee: Danie Koen

Bye/s: Northam Rhinos

=== Pool C ===
The final log of the 2016 Gold Cup Pool C is:

2016 Gold Cup Pool C standings
Pos	Team	P	W	D	L	PF	PA	PD	TF	TA	TB	LB	Pts
1	Brakpan	4	4	0	0	129	80	+49	17	9	3	0	19
2	False Bay	4	3	0	1	188	77	+111	27	10	3	1	16
3	Old Georgians	4	2	0	2	99	107	−8	8	11	0	0	8
4	Durban Collegians	4	1	0	3	110	128	−18	16	17	2	1	7
5	White River	4	0	0	4	54	188	−134	5	26	0	1	1

Legend and competition rules
Legend:
Top two teams; qualified to the quarter-finals.	P = Games played, W = Games won, D = Games drawn, L = Games lost, PF = Points for, PA = Points against, PD = Points difference, TF = Tries for, TA = Tries against, TB = Try bonus points, LB = Losing bonus points, Pts = Log points
Competition rules:
Play-offs: The top two teams qualified to the quarter-finals, where the pool winner hosted a runner-up from another pool. Points breakdown: * 4 points for a win * 2 points for a draw * 1 bonus point for a loss by seven points or less * 1 bonus point for scoring four or more tries in a match

The following matches were played in the 2016 Gold Cup Pool C:

==== Round one ====
10 September 2016	False Bay	37–19	Durban Collegians	Phil Herbstein Field, Constantia
15:30	Try: Mustaqeem Jappie 2'; Dylon Frylinck 16'; Adnaan Osman 37'; Dan Roux 51'; Ryan Olivier 58', 63'; Roemark Smith 71'; Con: Andri Claassen 59' (1/7)	Scoreboard	Try: Sipho Mkhize 29'; Shane Ball 66', 75'; Con: Sibulele Nanto 30' (1/2); Ethan Brennon Beukes 76' (1/1); Pen: Sibulele Nanto (0/1); Cards: Matthew Reece-Edwards (yellow card) 57' to 67'	Referee: Nathan Swartz

10 September 2016	White River	18–20	Old Georgians	White River Rugby Club, White River
15:30	Pen: Andy Huysamen 6', 23', 49', 56', 64', 73' (6/6)	Scoreboard	Try: Fortunate Chipendu 76'; Con: Lenience Tambwera (0/1); Pen: Lenience Tambwera 9', 29', 32', 44', 53' (5/5)	Referee: JD de Meyer

Bye/s: Brakpan

==== Round two ====
17 September 2016	Durban Collegians	36–17	White River	Growthpoint Kings Park, Durban
12:15	Try: Ethan Brennon Beukes 15'; Robbie Harris 35'; Fanelesibonge Sikhumbuzo Sifiso Zwane 55', 70'; Sibulele Nanto 59'; Sipho Mkhize 62'; Con: Ethan Brennon Beukes 36', 56' (2/3); Mondli Nkosi 63' (1/3)	Scoreboard	Try: Christiaan Labuschagné 73'; Werner Bekker 77'; Con: Andy Huysamen 74' (1/1); Eldred James 78' (1/1); Pen: Andy Huysamen 40' (1/3)	Referee: Archie Sehlako

17 September 2016	Brakpan	26–19	False Bay	Bosman Stadium, Brakpan
15:30	Try: Theo Mynhardt 1'; Francois Robbertse 38'; Thinus Ueckermann 43'; Con: Gido Horn 39' (1/3); Pen: Gido Horn 50', 53', 77' (3/3); Cards: Dwane Morrison (yellow card) 20' to 30'	Scoreboard	Try: Mustaqeem Jappie 41'; Riaan O'Neill 52'; Con: Adnaan Osman (0/2); Pen: Andri Claassen 14' (1/2); Adnaan Osman 21', 27' (2/2); Cards: André van Vuuren (yellow card) 20' to 30'	Referee: Eduan Nel

Bye/s: Old Georgians

==== Round three ====
24 September 2016	Durban Collegians	33–36	Brakpan	KP2, Kings Park, Durban
15:30	Try: Jasper Genis 13', 58'; Andrew Holland 18'; Wade Elliott 41'; Con: Ethan Brennon Beukes 14', 42' (2/4); Pen: Ethan Brennon Beukes 2', 52', 64' (3/4); Cards: Wade Elliott (yellow card) 71'	Scoreboard	Try: Theo Becker 8'; Thinus Ueckermann 11'; Hagen Mumba 35'; Ian Oosthuizen 43'; Armandt Jordaan 74'; Con: Gido Horn 9', 12', 36', 75' (4/5); Pen: Gido Horn 54' (1/1)	Referee: Craig Joubert

24 September 2016	Old Georgians	25–38	False Bay	Morris Depot Police Grounds, Harare
15:30	Try: Shingirai Katsvere 46'; Ryan Sprake 77'; Con: Lenience Tambwera (0/3); Pen: Lenience Tambwera 5', 16', 24', 35', 50' (5/11)	Scoreboard	Try: Mustaqeem Jappie 26'; Wesley Chetty 36'; Roemark Smith 65', 80'; Dasch Barber 74'; Con: Andri Claassen 28', 66' (2/5); Pen: Andri Claassen 8', 10', 30' (3/3); Cards: Ridhaa Damon (yellow card) 49'	Referee: Julian Mundawarara

Bye/s: White River

==== Round four ====
1 October 2016	Old Georgians	38–22	Durban Collegians	Old Georgians Sports Club, Harare
15:30	Try: Moses Gunda 25'; Lenience Tambwera 47'; Kingsley Lang 75'; Con: Lenience Tambwera 26' (1/3); Pen: Lenience Tambwera 2', 12', 15', 18', 56', 64', 73' (7/7)	Scoreboard	Try: Matthew Seba 33'; Carl Marks 40'; Jasper Genis 43'; Con: Ethan Brennon Beukes 40', 44' (2/3); Pen: Ethan Brennon Beukes 3' (1/1)	Referee: Shemeah Mushiribindi

1 October 2016	White River	12–38	Brakpan	White River Rugby Club, White River
15:30	Try: Tiaan Marx 58'; Denys Snyman 65'; Con: Eldred James 59' (1/2)	Scoreboard	Try: Jacques Moller 6'; Ian Oosthuizen 12', 69'; Johannes Botha 38'; Luzuko Ndanda 50'; Jaco Lotter 79'; Con: Gido Horn 13', 39', 70', 80' (4/6)	Referee: Pieter Maritz

Bye/s: False Bay

==== Round five ====
8 October 2016	Brakpan	29–16	Old Georgians	Bosman Stadium, Brakpan
15:00	Try: Theo Becker 1'; Thinus Ueckermann 30'; Gido Horn 50'; Ricardo Menezes 65'; Con: Hagen Mumba 2' (1/1); Gido Horn 31', 51' (2/3); Pen: Gido Horn 55' (1/1); Cards: Christo Joubert (yellow card) 21' to 31'; Jean-Pierre Snyman (yellow card) 74'	Scoreboard	Try: Kyle de Beer 26'; Con: Lenience Tambwera 27' (1/1); Pen: Lenience Tambwera 33', 59', 62' (3/4)	Referee: Jaco Pretorius

8 October 2016	False Bay	94–7	White River	Phil Herbstein Field, Constantia
15:00	Try: Andri Claassen 5'; Riaan O'Neill 14', 43', 46', 59'; Ashley Wells 19'; Dan Roux 21', 29', 31', 33', 78'; Mustaqeem Jappie 68', 76'; Wesley Chetty 70'; Con: Andri Claassen 6', 15', 22', 30', 32', 34', 44', 47', 60' (9/10); Adnaan Osman 69', 71' (2/3); Mustaqeem Jappie 79' (1/1)	Scoreboard	Try: Willem Petrus Janse van Rensburg 51'; Con: Andy Huysamen 52' (1/1); Pen: Andy Huysamen (0/1)	Referee: Rasta Rasivhenge

Bye/s: Durban Collegians

=== Pool D ===
The final log of the 2016 Gold Cup Pool D is:

2016 Gold Cup Pool D standings
Pos	Team	P	W	D	L	PF	PA	PD	TF	TA	TB	LB	Pts
1	Pretoria Police	4	4	0	0	195	70	+125	29	10	4	0	20
2	Port Elizabeth Police	4	3	0	1	103	87	+16	15	12	1	0	13
3	Sishen	4	2	0	2	128	103	+25	19	15	2	1	11
4	East London Police	4	1	0	3	62	144	−82	10	21	1	1	6
5	Bloemfontein Police	4	0	0	4	71	155	−84	10	25	1	1	2

Legend and competition rules
Legend:
Top two teams; qualified to the quarter-finals.	P = Games played, W = Games won, D = Games drawn, L = Games lost, PF = Points for, PA = Points against, PD = Points difference, TF = Tries for, TA = Tries against, TB = Try bonus points, LB = Losing bonus points, Pts = Log points
Competition rules:
Play-offs: The top two teams qualified to the quarter-finals, where the pool winner hosted a runner-up from another pool. Points breakdown: * 4 points for a win * 2 points for a draw * 1 bonus point for a loss by seven points or less * 1 bonus point for scoring four or more tries in a match

The following matches were played in the 2016 Gold Cup Pool D:

==== Round one ====
10 September 2016	Sishen	17–44	Pretoria Police	Sivos Rugby Stadium, Kathu
15:30	Try: Viljoen van der Linde 1'; Hugo van der Poll 78'; Con: Hendrik Olivier 2' (1/1); Brendon Coetzer 79' (1/1); Pen: Hendrik Olivier 13' (1/3); Brendon Coetzer (0/1)	Scoreboard	Try: Johan Pieterse 6', 70'; Rayno Wasserman 33'; Ivan Venter 38', 61'; Hendrik van der Nest 41', 65'; SJ Niemand 67'; Con: Dillon Laubscher 71' (1/4); Ivan Venter (0/3); Hendrik van der Nest 68' (1/1); Pen: Dillon Laubscher (0/2); Cards: Rinus Moulder (yellow card) 23' to 35'	Referee: Darren Colby

10 September 2016	Port Elizabeth Police	35–11	Bloemfontein Police	Kemsley Park, Port Elizabeth
15:30	Try: Sebastian Loxsen 20', 53'; Hannes Huisamen 33'; Daniel Vosloo 49'; Stephan Deyzel 68'; Kyle Scott 77'; Con: Ruan Allerston 54' (1/5); Dwayne Kelly (0/1); Pen: Ruan Allerston 13' (1/1)	Scoreboard	Try: Arno Visagie 59'; Con: Marco Matthee (0/1); Pen: Johannes Barnard 4', 23' (2/3)	Referee: JP Clements

Bye/s: East London Police

==== Round two ====
16 September 2016	Pretoria Police	40–24	Port Elizabeth Police	Loftus Versfeld, Pretoria
16:15	Try: Theunis Kruger 22'; Hendrik van der Nest 46'; Phumudzo Shepherd Tshiovhe 64'; Tinus Hoffman 74'; Ian van Deventer 80'; Con: Dillon Laubscher 23', 76', 80' (3/5); Pen: Dillon Laubscher 38', 42', 74' (3/3)	Scoreboard	Try: Kyle Scott 9'; Alwyn Jordaan 40'; Matthew Moore 79'; Con: Ruan Allerston 11', 40', 80' (3/3); Pen: Ruan Allerston 32' (1/5); Cards: Jaco Pretorius (yellow card) 73'	Referee: Morné Ferreira

17 September 2016	East London Police	18–30	Sishen	Police Park, East London
15:30	Try: Mauel Senoge 25'; Sabelo Kolanisi 29'; Skhangele Mateza 40'; Con: Skhangele Mateza (0/3); Pen: Skhangele Mateza 11' (1/2); Cards: Skhangele Mateza (yellow card) 54' to 64'	Scoreboard	Try: Charlton McCarthy 8'; Louwrens Strydom 37'; Brendon Coetzer 70'; Jandré du Plessis 75'; Con: Hendrik Olivier 9', 38' (2/4); Pen: Hendrik Olivier 42', 58' (2/2); Drop: Brendon Coetzer (0/1); Cards: Louwrens Strydom (yellow card) 21' to 31'	Referee: Sindile Ngcese

Bye/s: Bloemfontein Police

==== Round three ====
24 September 2016	Port Elizabeth Police	20–17	East London Police	Kemsley Park, Port Elizabeth
15:30	Try: Matthew Moore 46'; Lyle Walters 71'; Stephan Deyzel 78'; Con: Ruan Allerston (0/2); Justin Peach 79' (1/1); Pen: Ruan Allerston 17' (1/2); Justin Peach (0/1); Cards: Dwayne Kelly (yellow card) 36'	Scoreboard	Try: Sabelo Kolanisi 1'; Eric Coates 20'; Bonga Mntunjani 28'; Con: Skhangele Mateza 21' (1/3); Pen: Skhangele Mateza (0/1); Cards: Kuhle Thumani (red card) 27'; Sabelo Kolanisi (yellow card) 68'	Referee: Sinethemba Mrulwa

24 September 2016	Bloemfontein Police	24–36	Pretoria Police	Bobbies Park, Bloemfontein
15:30	Try: Luzandré Swarts 13'; Johannes Duvenhage 18'; Frank Ferreira 62'; Phillip Spies 67'; Con: Johannes Barnard 14', 19' (2/3); André Potgieter (0/1); Cards: Joshua Saayman (yellow card) 51' to 61'; Willem Steenkamp (yellow card) 53' to 63'	Scoreboard	Try: Willie Odendaal 6'; Pieter Willem Botha 8', 78'; Dillon Laubscher 15'; Phumudzo Shepherd Tshiovhe 33'; Con: Dillon Laubscher 7', 9', 16' (3/4); Morné Hugo 79' (1/1); Pen: Dillon Laubscher (0/1); Morné Hugo 73' (1/1); Cards: Ian van Deventer (yellow card) 65' to 75'	Attendance: 200; Referee: Griffon Colby

Bye/s: Sishen

==== Round four ====
1 October 2016	East London Police	22–19	Bloemfontein Police	Police Park, East London
15:30	Try: Odwa Rasmeni 11'; Lonwabo Ntlama 43'; Aden Williams 49'; Oscar Limani 65'; Con: Skhangele Mateza 50' (1/4); Pen: Skhangele Mateza (0/1); Cards: Sokhana Mkhona (yellow card) 73'	Scoreboard	Try: Donavan Ball 14'; Johannes Barnard 35'; Arno Visagie 75'; Con: Johannes Barnard 36', 76' (2/3); Cards: Randall Nelson (yellow card) 60' to 70'	Referee: JP Clements

1 October 2016	Sishen	19–24	Port Elizabeth Police	Sivos Rugby Stadium, Kathu
15:30	Try: Cornelius Prinsloo 57', 73'; Tiaan Dippenaar 70'; Con: Hendrik Olivier (0/1); Brendon Coetzer 71', 74' (2/2); Pen: Hendrik Olivier (0/1); Brendon Coetzer (0/1); Cards: BW van Dyk (yellow card) 29' to 39'; Jandré du Plessis (yellow card) 39' to 49'; Prince Mofokeng (yellow card) 79'	Scoreboard	Try: Lyle Walters 42', 45'; Stephan Deyzel 64'; Con: Justin Peach 43', 46' (2/2); Ruan Allerston 65' (1/1); Pen: Justin Peach (0/3); Ruan Allerston 78' (1/1)	Referee: Mpho Matsaung

Bye/s: Pretoria Police

==== Round five ====
8 October 2016	Bloemfontein Police	17–62	Sishen	Bobbies Park, Bloemfontein
15:00	Try: Rupert Cronjé 53'; Johannes Duvenhage 78'; Con: Johannes Barnard 54', 79' (2/2); Pen: Johannes Barnard 5' (1/1); Cards: Randall Nelson (yellow card) 30' to 40'; Izak Kruger (yellow card) 70'	Scoreboard	Try: Dawid Roux 9', 13'; John Spence 18', 58', 76'; Mario van Rooyen 24'; Brendon Coetzer 32'; Sarel du Plessis 39'; Hendrik Olivier 48'; Len le Roux 72'; Con: Hendrik Olivier (0/1); Brendon Coetzer 25', 33', 49', 59', 73', 77' (6/8)	Attendance: 200; Referee: Lourens van der Merwe

8 October 2016	Pretoria Police	75–5	East London Police	Loftus Versfeld, Pretoria
15:00	Try: Ian van Deventer 1', 38', 39'; Vince Gwavu 14'; Pieter Willem Botha 18' penalty try 31'; Tlhabane Johannes Motsepe 34'; Willie Odendaal 36'; Pieter Strydom 53'; Johan Pieterse 56'; Tinus Hoffman 67'; Con: Morné Hugo 15', 19', 32', 35', 37', 39', 40', 54', 57', 68' (10/11)	Scoreboard	Try: Hlumelo Maku 63'; Con: Skhangele Mateza (0/1); Pen: Skhangele Mateza (0/1)	Referee: Stephan Geldenhuys

Bye/s: Port Elizabeth Police

== Play-offs ==
=== Quarter-finals ===
15 October 2016	Pretoria Police	12–40	False Bay	Loftus Versfeld, Pretoria
15:15	Try: Pieter Willem Botha 20'; Hendrik van der Nest 32'; Con: Dillon Laubscher 33' (1/2); Pen: Dillon Laubscher (0/2)	Scoreboard	Try: Mustaqeem Jappie 4'; Dylon Frylinck 47'; Dasch Barber 76'; Jason Pretorius 79'; Con: Andri Claassen 5', 48', 77', 80' (4/4); Pen: Andri Claassen 11', 23', 64', 69' (4/4)	Referee: Vusi Msibi

15 October 2016	Brakpan	61–3	Port Elizabeth Police	Bosman Stadium, Brakpan
15:30	Try: Clayton Gindan 3'; Hagen Mumba 8'; Thinus Ueckermann 12', 61'; Ian Oosthuizen 22', 26', 78'; Raydall Walters 28'; Ronwin Roets 49'; Con: Hagen Mumba 4', 9', 13', 23', 27' (5/6); Gido Horn 50', 62', 79' (3/3); Cards: Jason Arundel (yellow card) 32' to 42'	Scoreboard	Drop: Ruan Allerston 75' (1/1); Cards: Eckard Jacobs (yellow card) 78'	Referee: Pieter Maritz

15 October 2016	Durbanville-Bellville	27–19	Evergreens	Durbanville-Bellville Rugby Club
15:30	Try: Andrew Picoto 20'; Angus Cleophas 36'; Brenden Esterhuizen 80'; Con: Angus Cleophas 21', 37' (2/2); Raymond Olivier 81' (1/1); Pen: Angus Cleophas 30' (1/1); Raymond Olivier 70' (1/1); Cards: Gideon Thiart (yellow card) 10' to 21'	Scoreboard	Try: Divandré Strydom 76'; Con: Leegan Moos 77' (1/1); Pen: Leegan Moos 7', 34', 68' (3/4); C-Than Moos 25' (1/1); Cards: Marvin November (yellow card) 6' to 18' Layle Delo (yellow card) 70'	Referee: Paul Mente

15 October 2016	Rustenburg Impala	52–19	College Rovers	Rustenburg Impala Rugby Club, Rustenburg
15:30	Try: Leon du Plessis 3', 34'; Cecil Dumond 13', 54' penalty try 46'; Bruce Muller 57'; JP le Grange 62'; Aubrey McDonald 71'; Con: Cecil Dumond 4', 14', 35', 47', 55', 58' (6/6); David van Biljon (0/2)	Scoreboard	Try: Tythan Adams 25', 74'; Matt Phillips 65'; Con: Chris Jordaan 26' (1/1); Matt Phillips 75' (1/2); Pen: Chris Jordaan (0/3); Cards: Le Roux Viljoen (yellow card) 43' to 53'	Referee: Jaco Kotze

=== Semi-finals ===
23 October 2016	Durbanville-Bellville	35–41	False Bay	Durbanville-Bellville Rugby Club
13:00	Try: Etienne Swarts 41', 63'; Ashton Constant 72'; Brenden Esterhuizen 79'; Con: Tiaan Radyn (0/1); Raymond Olivier 63', 73', 80' (3/3); Pen: Tiaan Radyn 5', 10' (2/3); Raymond Olivier 67' (1/1)	Scoreboard	Try: Dan Roux 6'; Ridhaa Damon 30'; Riaan O'Neill 39'; Dylon Frylinck 70'; Dasch Barber 76'; Con: Andri Claassen 7', 31', 40' (3/3); Ridhaa Damon 71' (1/1); Adnaan Osman 77' (1/1); Pen: Andri Claassen 12', 52' (2/5)	Referee: Rasta Rasivhenge

23 October 2016	Rustenburg Impala	44–32	Brakpan	Rustenburg Impala Rugby Club, Rustenburg
15:30	Try: Bruce Muller 22'; Louis Hollamby 28'; Nico Kruger 47'; Cecil Dumond 51'; Dumisani Matyeshana 75'; Con: Cecil Dumond 23', 29', 48', 52' (4/4); David van Biljon 76' (1/1); Pen: Gysbert van Wyk (0/1); Cecil Dumond 6', 38', 55' (3/3)	Scoreboard	Try: Clayton Gindan 54', 68'; Jaco Lotter 56'; Gido Horn 78'; Con: Gido Horn 55', 57', 78' (3/4); Pen: Gido Horn 17', 25' (2/3); Cards: Francois Robbertse (yellow card) 10' to 20'	Referee: Pro Legoete

=== Final ===
29 October 2016	Rustenburg Impala	48–24	False Bay	Rustenburg Impala Rugby Club, Rustenburg
15:45	Try: Dumisani Matyeshana 19', 34'; Leon du Plessis 29'; Justin Wheeler 43', 73'; Cecil Dumond 51', 54'; Justin St Jerry 58'; Con: Cecil Dumond 30', 55', 60' (3/5); Gysbert van Wyk (0/2); David van Biljon 73' (1/1)	Scoreboard	Try: Mustaqeem Jappie 17'; Ashley Wells 64'; Dylon Frylinck 75'; Con: Andri Claassen 18' (1/1); Adnaan Osman 65', 77' (2/2); Pen: Andri Claassen (0/4); Adnaan Osman 32' (1/1)	Referee: Jaco van Heerden

== Honours ==
The honour roll for the 2016 Gold Cup was:

2016 Gold Cup Honours
Champions:	Rustenburg Impala (2nd title)
Top Points Scorer:	Cecil Dumond, Rustenburg Impala (102)
Top Try Scorers:	Tythan Adams, College Rovers (10)

== Players ==
=== Squads ===
The following squads were named for the 2016 Gold Cup:

Bloemfontein Police squad
Forwards	Donavan Ball • Francois Bezuidenhout • Raymond Boshoff • Jandré Briedenhann • Juan Jansen van Vuuren • Dirk Nel • Randall Nelson • Joshua Saayman • Phillip Spies • Willem Steenkamp • Renier Steyn • Michael Taylor • Lebohang Tsoeu • Johnny van der Merwe • Johannes van der Vyver • Frederick van Wyk • Arno Visagie
Backs	Johannes Barnard • Clint Carson • Rupert Cronjé • Johannes Duvenhage • Eugene Erasmus • Frank Ferreira • Louis Koen • Izak Kruger • Marco Marais • Marco Matthee • Riandré Muller • André Potgieter • Fourie Smuts • Pieter Snyman • Luzandré Swarts • Marco Vermeulen
Did not play	Juan-Pierre Smit • Michael Smit • Warren Orville van Wyngard

Brakpan squad
Forwards	Jason Arundel • Theo Becker • Vernon du Preez • Wihan Dippenaar • Pierre Foord • Armandt Jordaan • Jaco Lotter • Ricardo Menezes • Jacques Moller • Dwane Morrison • Theo Mynhardt • Ian Oosthuizen • Garnett Parkin • Francois Robbertse • Jean-Pierre Snyman • Wikus van der Berg • Dean van der Merwe
Backs	Franco Booysen • Shaun Botes • Johannes Botha • Clayton Gindan • Gido Horn • Christo Joubert • Zolile Mtshali • Hagen Mumba • Luzuko Ndanda • Leon Potgieter • Tiaan Ramat • Ronwin Roets • Tobie Strydom • Thinus Ueckermann • Daniel van der Walt • Raydall Walters
Did not play	Dean Branders • Darren Brian Lindsay • Sybrand Pieter van der Merwe

College Rovers squad
Forwards	Kelvin Adam • Paul Bester • Nico Bezuidenhout • Jarrett Crouch • Brian Habbick • Jandré Jacobs • Jason Kankowski • Chris Kemp • Witness Mandizha • Njabulo Mkize • Mesuli Mncwango • Lwazi Ngcungama • Sheldon Norris • Jean Pretorius • Luciando Santos • Sanele Sibanda • Le Roux Viljoen
Backs	Tythan Adams • Brandon Bailing • Troy Chiocchetti • Gary Collins • Dumisani Dyonase • Gareth Jenkinson • Chris Jordaan • Matt Phillips • Warren Randall • Willem Rheeder • Mark Richards • Michael Scheepers • Gavin Scott • Kyle Wilkinson
Did not play	Steven Booysen • Mitchell Coe • Michael Hutton • Lloyd Jacobs • Dauw Steyn

Durban Collegians squad
Forwards	Wade Elliott • Jan Ferreira • Denham Leo Fosteras • Robbie Harris • Mitchell Hildebrand • Robert Loiuse Jose Izaks • Byron Johnstone • Matt Jones • Thobelani Gugulethu Mabaso • Carl Marks • Sibulele Nanto • Jacobus Hendrickus Oosthuyzen • Johannes Retief • Jonathan Swiatek • Chris van Leeuwen • Francois Frederik van Zyl • Fanelesibonge Sikhumbuzo Sifiso Zwane
Backs	Shane Ball • Ethan Brennon Beukes • Ngoni Chibuwe • Liam Draycott • Bradley Ellse • Jasper Genis • Andrew Holland • Dylan Marcus • Sipho Mkhize • Justin Newman • Mondli Nkosi • Matthew Reece-Edwards • Calvin Sacks • Matthew Seba

Durbanville-Bellville squad
Forwards	Michael Badenhorst • Daneel Botes • Arend Brink • Ashton Constant • Brenden Esterhuizen • Ashley Kohler • Daniel Krynauw • Karl Liebenberg • Pieter Loubser • Andrew Picoto • Stephen Potgieter • Conway Pretorius • Steven-Floyd Robbeson • Erasmus van der Linde • Jacques Vermaak
Backs	Angus Cleophas • Janco Gunter • Jason Kriel • Jos Malherbe • Roderick Moses • Raymond Olivier • Tiaan Radyn • Cheslyn Roberts • Etienne Swarts • Gideon Thiart • Frank Wagenstroom • Denzel Willemse
Did not play	Edward Christiaan Kriel • Ruan Laubscher • Marius Tiaan Roelofse • Hanno Snyman • Craig Walker

East London Police squad
Forwards	Odwa Gxamza • Siseko Kepe • Lutho Klaas • Sivuyile Kobokana • Oscar Limani • Xola Mapapu • Mvuzo Mazibukwana • Sokhana Mkhona • Bonga Mntunjani • Siya November • Manuel Senoge • Sikholisekile Sodlula • Kuhle Thumani • Aden Williams
Backs	Eric Coates • Ayanda Davids • Sabelo Kolanisi • Hlumelo Maku • Skhangele Mateza • Loyiso Ndaba • Lonwabo Ntlama • Odwa Rasmeni • Paul Schonfeldt • Bayanda Siko • Zwelivumile Tanana
Did not play	Wernich Erasmus • Kobus Herselman • Gregory Matthee • Mbulelo Mtyoko

Evergreens squad
Forwards	Freginald Africa • Darren April • Anston Bernardo • Layle Delo • Gerschwin Muller • Alistair November • Byron November • Grant November • Marvin November • Buran Parks • Anvor Prins • Isaac Treurnicht • Lluwellyn Treurnicht • Glenwynne Vaaltyn • Cheslin van Rayner • Arden-Lee Wesso
Backs	Gideon Lambrechts • Alroy Louis • Rudi Michaels • Clint Miller • C-Than Moos • Leegan Moos • Mario Noordman • Lee-Roy Pojie • Duwayne Smart • Deon Stoffels • Chadley Stride • Divandré Strydom
Did not play	Elton October • Sergio Carlo Prins • Xavier Scholtz • Wian Wynand Small • Riaan Percival Tromp • Siphumeze Stanley Tshetsha • Luzanne Williams

False Bay squad
Forwards	Dasch Barber • Wesley Chetty • Willie Coetzee • Wesley Futter • Curtley Johnson • Graham Knoop • Aiden Monk • Royal Mwale • Ryan Olivier • Brent Stevens • André van Vuuren • Justin van Winkel • Ashley Wells • Andrew Whittaker • Brandon Wood
Backs	Andri Claassen • Ridhaa Damon • Dylon Frylinck • Mustaqeem Jappie • Byron Mohr • Riaan O'Neill • Adnaan Osman • Joshua Pinn • Jason Pretorius • Dan Roux • Roemark Smith • Meryck Ward
Did not play	Ross Anthony Beckett • Leighton Bezuidenhout • Simon Blakeley • Sheldon Matthew Fortuin • Vincent Kayster • Alistair Mulholland • Grant Muller • Martin Sidney Sauls

Northam Rhinos squad
Forwards	Jimmy Baloyi • Adriaan Botha • Willem Botha • Johannes du Toit • Moegamad Gasant • Mark Humphries • Nico Kriel • Paul Lindenberg • Adriaan Louw • Dieter Marquardt • Sam Mcetywa • Tyson Mulamba • Odwa Tinise • Marthienus van den Berg • Benhard van Heerden
Backs	Whelan Fortuin • Johan Harmse • Johannes Harmzen • Jacques Hattingh • Patrick Hattingh • Jaun-Pierre Jacobs • Stephan Jacobs • Christopher Juries • Danie Loots • Hughwinn Majiedt • Amri Schlebusch
Did not play	Ruan Botha • William Botha • Ruaan Jacobs • Mvuyisi Notisi • Phillipus Smit • Marnus Struwig

Old Georgians squad
Forwards	Fortunate Chipendu • Graham Cochrane • Kyle de Beer • Tendai Dzongodza • Moses Gunda • Jakov Jakov • Kingsley Lang • Jacques Leitao • David Makanda • Derric Murangari • Keith Murray • Kudzai Musorewa • Wade Petzer • Gabriel Sipapate • Richard Wild
Backs	Brandon Shane Boshi • Stephan Hunduza • Sir Farai John Jijita • Chido Kapenzi • Shingirai Katsvere • Graham Kaulback • Tafa Mukonyora • David McWade • Jonathan McWade • Boyd Rouse • Ryan Sprake • Lenience Tambwera
Did not play	Jafnos Chiwanza • Anthony Holt • Nyasha Mangena • Tinashe Ndanga • Tawanda Ngosi

Old Selbornians squad
Forwards	Duran Alberts • Roy Bursey • Armon Fourie • Craig Gombert • Craig Green • Akona Makalima • Richard Osner • Dylan Pieterse • Ryan Pietersen • Shane Spring • Marcel Swanepoel • Sesethu Time • Sinethemba Tyokolwana • Antonio van Heerden • Bobby Volschenk • Neil Wood
Backs	Joshua Bassingthwaite • Bradley Birkholtz • Gareth Catherine • Reinhardt Gerber • Andisa Gqobo • Bradley Hart • Andrew Klinkradt • MJ le Marquand • Leon Andrew Mauer • Yongama Mkaza • Phiwe Nomlomo • Foxy Ntleki • Buhle Mikhail Ntsebeza • Craig Shone • Thabo Sisusa
Did not play	Lindani Gulwa • Ashley Hartmann • Luyolo Zingisa Manentsa • Siyabonga Mxunyelwa • Craig Pedersen • David Radloff • Onesimo Tshangana

Pirates squad
Forwards	Rinus Bothma • Cole de Jager • Anthony Gallagher • Johannes Janse van Rensburg • Chris Newman • Jean-Pierre Olivier • Kiernan Rabie • Dylan Roy Rigney • Martin Scheepers • Ben Sekgobela • Dudley Stead • Sheldon Terblanché • Bradley van Niekerk • Ernest van Niekerk • Johannes Zeeman • Nqubeko Zulu
Backs	Estiaan Conradie • Hanco Deale • Duncan Delport • Steven du Plessis • Zunaid Kock • Bryce Nicholson-Deh • Jama Ntengo • Jacques Swart • David William Turnbull • Johan Venter • Christiaan Pieter Visser • Chanley Williams • Sheldon Williamson

Port Elizabeth Police squad
Forwards	Stephan Deyzel • Raynard Fourie • Ruben Fourie • Ferdi Gerber • Frans Gerber • Hannes Huisamen • Dwayne Kinghorn • Lyle Lombard • Dewald Meyer • Matthew Moore • Marius Olivier • Ronald Scheckle • Kaylor Timothy • Wayne van Heerden • Bron-Lee Viviers • Lyle Walters • Chris Zeelie
Backs	Ruan Allerston • Eben Barnard • Eckard Jacobs • Alwyn Jordaan • Dwayne Kelly • Sebastian Loxsen • Damien Moultre • Justin Peach • Kevin Plaatjies • Jaco Pretorius • Kyle Scott • Daniel Vosloo
Did not play	Bathandwa Chris Cafu • Sinjin Greyvenstein • Thahiso Mbewu • Lulama Mndozi • Juan Smit • Leon Smith

Pretoria Police squad
Forwards	Emwee Arlow • Vince Gwavu • Tinus Hoffman • Imilius Keyser • Hannes Ludik • Pieter Matthews • Tlhabane Johannes Motsepe • Rinus Moulder • SJ Niemand • Johan Pieterse • Jerry Sefoko • Divan Steenekamp • Brendan Stelzer • Louis van Biljon • Ian van Deventer • Boris van Jaarsveld • Rayno Wasserman
Backs	Pieter Willem Botha • Morné Hugo • Theunis Kruger • Dillon Laubscher • Johannes le Grange • Michael Nienaber • Willie Odendaal • Hendrik Frederik Pieterse • Nhlalala Baron Sithole • Pieter Strydom • Phumudzo Shepherd Tshiovhe • Hendrik van der Nest • Ivan Venter

Rustenburg Impala squad
Forwards	Marius Breytenbach • Zander de Kock • Leon du Plessis • Johan Engelbrecht • Ivann Espag • Louis Hollamby • Hendrik Huyser • JP le Grange • Bruce Muller • Tiaan Nel • Tiaan Prinsloo • Robbie Rawlins • Wian van Schalkwyk • Justin Wheeler • Gavin Williamson
Backs	Mzivukile Duma • Cecil Dumond • Willie Kok • Nico Kruger • Stefan Kruger • Dumisani Matyeshana • Aubrey McDonald • Xolani Isaac Nkosi • Justin St Jerry • David van Biljon • Maverick van der Merwe • Gysbert van Wyk

Sishen squad
Forwards	Henlo Boshoff • Augusto Chiula • Tiaan Dippenaar • Ivandré Knoetze • Armand Martin • Cornelius Prinsloo • Jan Rossouw • Dawid Roux • John Spence • Nicolaas Steyn • Louwrens Strydom • Petrus van der Linde • BW van Dyk • Willie Vermeulen
Backs	Brendon Coetzer • Jandré du Plessis • Sarel du Plessis • Len le Roux • Charlton McCarthy • Prince Mofokeng • Thabang Molefe • Hendrik Olivier • Johan Peens • Francois Swart • Viljoen van der Linde • Hugo van der Poll • Mario van Rooyen
Did not play	Cornelius Janse Villiers Botma • Marius Ellis • Hendrik Jacobus Joubert • Kyle Kriel • Nicolaas Poolman • Truter Small • Gert Lukas Strydom • Cornelis Jacob van Wyk • Dylan Walsh • Ainsley Raynee Wilschut

Villagers Worcester squad
Forwards	Jason Basson • Yrin Quift Belelie • Timothy Beukes • Morné Boshoff • Kenan Cronjé • Ashley Peter Godfrey Dreyden • André du Toit • Jasherie Karriem • Franklin Daniel Kuhn • Liano Lindoor • Neshwille Simpson • Curtley Timm • Egan Uren • Sergeyodei Beresford Uys • Regarth Valla
Backs	Cheslin Adams • Gurshwin Africa • Jacques Damons • Lincolin Ryan Eksteen • Clayton Isaacs • Shandro Issel • Kyle Jacobs • Yazeed Johnson • Ricardo Jones • Lorenzo Miggel • Elton Valla • Nazeem Nilton van Sitters • Jowayne van Wyk
Did not play	Jennewil April • TC Botha • Llewellyn Lionel Buys • Denvin Cupido • Graeme Peter Cupido • Chad Horne • Ashwill Peters • Ivaan Schell • Girchen Wentzel

Welkom Rovers squad
Forwards	Josias Hendrikus Blom • Clifford Cawood • Jackson Chabeli • Ivan de Klerk • William Diesel • Floris du Plessis • Gerhard Klopper • Gert Petrus Jacobus Luwes • Morné Mkwayi • Donavan Nieuwenhuyzen • Ruan Olivier • Tanki David Sello • Willem van Staden • LC van Tonder
Backs	Willem Jakobus Johannes Botha • Jovanian du Preez • Jaco Jooste • Jakobus Jordaan • Teboho Khampepe • Curtis Kleinhans • Shaun Nieuwenhuyzen • Colin Odendaal • Jaco Pretorius • Tiaan van Wyk • Freddie Wepener
Did not play	Steven Johan Breytenbach • Adriaan Johannes Coetzee • Corné Cooper • John-Ross Diesel • Jozeph Adrian du Plessis • Dillon Claude Hardenburg • Marco Leech • Brummer Marais • Jean-Jacques Muller • Robbie Ntlantsana • Jaun-re Dewet Pretorius • Tjaart Aucamp Sauer • Kevin van Zyl

White River squad
Forwards	Daniel Austin • Werner Bekker • Hendrik Botha • Jaco Bouwer • Willem Petrus Janse van Rensburg • Johannes Jonker • Willem Kotze • Christiaan Labuschagné • Doppies le Roux • Jaco Marneweck • Revive Mashego • Martin Mafa Mhlongo • Ross Omahoney • Hendrik Roos • André Scholtz • Wilhelm Steenkamp
Backs	Johan Booysen • Conrad Botha • Chris Brigi • Andy Huysamen • Eldred James • Tiaan Marx • Dawid Pretorius • Pule Sibiya • Johannes Smit • Denys Snyman • Henk van Tonder • Clive van Zyl • Ferdill Vilander
Did not play	Adriaan Barnard • Andries Caroto • Michael de Bruyn • Daniel du Preez • Michael Esmeralda • Matiam Oosthuizen • Pieter-Erns Prinsloo • Cornelius Coenraad Scheepers • Giovanni van Kraayenburg • Jacques Verwey

Windhoek Wanderers squad
Forwards	Nian Berg • Schalk Bergh • Kudu Botha • Mattheus Lourens Brand • Petri Burger • Theo Coetzee • AJ de Klerk • Dirk de Meyer • Shaun du Preez • Alberto Engelbrecht • Nico Esterhuyse • Rohan Kitshoff • Gert Lotter • PG Louw • Ruan Ludick • Morné Rupert Prenn • Willem Jacobus van Zyl • DG Wiese
Backs	Silvano Beukes • Gino Chiappini • Jamie Joseph • Enem Kritzinger • Cody la Cock • Malcolm Moore • Philip Nashikaku • Edwardo Nell • Zaynor Platt • Heico Prinsloo • Mahco Prinsloo • Tershwin Raubenheimer • Heinrich Smit • Lean Stoop • Riaan van Zyl • Francois Wiese
Did not play	Tinus du Plessis • Quintin Esterhuizen • Gerhardt Liebenberg • MP Pretorius • Carel Swanepoel • Dion Venter

=== Points scorers ===
The following table contain points scored in the 2016 Gold Cup:

Top Ten point scorers
No	Player	Team	T	C	P	DG	Pts
1	Cecil Dumond	Rustenburg Impala	7	26	5	0	102
2	Andri Claassen	False Bay	1	20	10	0	75
3	Lenience Tambwera	Old Georgians	1	2	20	0	69
4	Gido Horn	Brakpan	2	17	7	0	65
5	Leegan Moos	Evergreens	2	9	9	0	55
6	Tiaan Radyn	Durbanville-Bellville	0	9	12	0	54
7	Tythan Adams	College Rovers	10	0	0	0	50
8	Leon du Plessis	Rustenburg Impala	8	0	0	0	40
9	Hanco Deale	Pirates	0	8	7	0	37
9	Patrick Hattingh	Northam Rhinos	1	13	2	0	37
9	Mustaqeem Jappie	False Bay	7	1	0	0	37

Other point scorers
No	Player	Team	T	C	P	DG	Pts
12	Matt Phillips	College Rovers	3	7	2	0	35
12	Dan Roux	False Bay	7	0	0	0	35
12	Tiaan van Wyk	Welkom Rovers	0	7	7	0	35
15	Mahco Prinsloo	Windhoek Wanderers	1	11	2	0	33
16	Ethan Brennon Beukes	Durban Collegians	1	7	4	0	31
17	Angus Cleophas	Durbanville-Bellville	3	6	1	0	30
17	Dillon Laubscher	Pretoria Police	1	8	3	0	30
17	Riaan O'Neill	False Bay	6	0	0	0	30
17	Ian Oosthuizen	Brakpan	6	0	0	0	30
21	Brendon Coetzer	Sishen	2	9	0	0	28
22	Johannes Barnard	Bloemfontein Police	1	6	3	0	26
23	Ruan Allerston	Port Elizabeth Police	0	5	4	1	25
23	Morné Hugo	Pretoria Police	0	11	1	0	25
23	Andy Huysamen	White River	0	2	7	0	25
23	Nico Kruger	Rustenburg Impala	5	0	0	0	25
23	Dumisani Matyeshana	Rustenburg Impala	5	0	0	0	25
23	Bruce Muller	Rustenburg Impala	5	0	0	0	25
23	Thinus Ueckermann	Brakpan	5	0	0	0	25
23	Justin Wheeler	Rustenburg Impala	5	0	0	0	25
31	Adnaan Osman	False Bay	1	5	3	0	24
32	Clayton Isaacs	Villagers Worcester	0	5	4	0	22
32	Hagen Mumba	Brakpan	2	6	0	0	22
32	Hendrik van der Nest	Pretoria Police	4	1	0	0	22
35	Freginald Africa	Evergreens	4	0	0	0	20
35	Brenden Esterhuizen	Durbanville-Bellville	4	0	0	0	20
35	Dylon Frylinck	False Bay	4	0	0	0	20
35	Jandré Jacobs	College Rovers	4	0	0	0	20
35	Danie Loots	Northam Rhinos	4	0	0	0	20
35	Aubrey McDonald	Rustenburg Impala	4	0	0	0	20
35	Hendrik Olivier	Sishen	1	3	3	0	20
35	Duwayne Smart	Evergreens	4	0	0	0	20
35	Lean Stoop	Windhoek Wanderers	4	0	0	0	20
35	Jacques Swart	Pirates	4	0	0	0	20
35	Etienne Swarts	Durbanville-Bellville	4	0	0	0	20
35	Ian van Deventer	Pretoria Police	4	0	0	0	20
35	Pieter Willem Botha	Pretoria Police	4	0	0	0	20
48	Chris Jordaan	College Rovers	3	1	0	0	17
49	Reinhardt Gerber	Old Selbornians	0	2	4	0	16
50	Michael Badenhorst	Durbanville-Bellville	3	0	0	0	15
50	Joshua Bassingthwaite	Old Selbornians	3	0	0	0	15
50	Stephan Deyzel	Port Elizabeth Police	3	0	0	0	15
50	Alberto Engelbrecht	Windhoek Wanderers	3	0	0	0	15
50	Jasper Genis	Durban Collegians	3	0	0	0	15
50	Clayton Gindan	Brakpan	3	0	0	0	15
50	Christopher Juries	Northam Rhinos	3	0	0	0	15
50	Nazeem Nilton van Sitters	Villagers Worcester	3	0	0	0	15
50	Johan Pieterse	Pretoria Police	3	0	0	0	15
50	Jaco Pretorius	Welkom Rovers	3	0	0	0	15
50	Roemark Smith	False Bay	3	0	0	0	15
50	John Spence	Sishen	3	0	0	0	15
50	Lyle Walters	Port Elizabeth Police	3	0	0	0	15
63	Raymond Olivier	Durbanville-Bellville	0	4	2	0	14
63	Gavin Scott	College Rovers	0	7	0	0	14
63	David van Biljon	Rustenburg Impala	0	7	0	0	14
63	Riaan van Zyl	Windhoek Wanderers	1	3	1	0	14
67	Christiaan Pieter Visser	Pirates	0	2	3	0	13
68	Skhangele Mateza	East London Police	1	2	1	0	12
68	Craig Shone	Old Selbornians	0	3	2	0	12
70	Chanley Williams	Pirates	0	4	1	0	11
71	Duran Alberts	Old Selbornians	2	0	0	0	10
71	Shane Ball	Durban Collegians	2	0	0	0	10
71	Dasch Barber	False Bay	2	0	0	0	10
71	Theo Becker	Brakpan	2	0	0	0	10
71	Daneel Botes	Durbanville-Bellville	2	0	0	0	10
71	Wesley Chetty	False Bay	2	0	0	0	10
71	Ashton Constant	Durbanville-Bellville	2	0	0	0	10
71	Johannes Duvenhage	Bloemfontein Police	2	0	0	0	10
71	Lincolin Ryan Eksteen	Villagers Worcester	2	0	0	0	10
71	Tinus Hoffman	Pretoria Police	2	0	0	0	10
71	Louis Hollamby	Rustenburg Impala	2	0	0	0	10
71	Jasherie Karriem	Villagers Worcester	2	0	0	0	10
71	Curtis Kleinhans	Welkom Rovers	2	0	0	0	10
71	Gerhard Klopper	Welkom Rovers	2	0	0	0	10
71	Sabelo Kolanisi	East London Police	2	0	0	0	10
71	JP le Grange	Rustenburg Impala	2	0	0	0	10
71	Gert Lotter	Windhoek Wanderers	2	0	0	0	10
71	Jaco Lotter	Brakpan	2	0	0	0	10
71	Sebastian Loxsen	Port Elizabeth Police	2	0	0	0	10
71	Hughwinn Majiedt	Northam Rhinos	2	0	0	0	10
71	Sipho Mkhize	Durban Collegians	2	0	0	0	10
71	Matthew Moore	Port Elizabeth Police	2	0	0	0	10
71	Roderick Moses	Durbanville-Bellville	2	0	0	0	10
71	Chris Newman	Pirates	2	0	0	0	10
71	Bryce Nicholson-Deh	Pirates	2	0	0	0	10
71	Xolani Isaac Nkosi	Rustenburg Impala	2	0	0	0	10
71	Buhle Mikhail Ntsebeza	Old Selbornians	2	0	0	0	10
71	Willie Odendaal	Pretoria Police	2	0	0	0	10
71	Ryan Olivier	False Bay	2	0	0	0	10
71	Buran Parks	Evergreens	2	0	0	0	10
71	Andrew Picoto	Durbanville-Bellville	2	0	0	0	10
71	Conway Pretorius	Durbanville-Bellville	2	0	0	0	10
71	Cornelius Prinsloo	Sishen	2	0	0	0	10
71	Tershwin Raubenheimer	Windhoek Wanderers	2	0	0	0	10
71	Willem Rheeder	College Rovers	2	0	0	0	10
71	Dawid Roux	Sishen	2	0	0	0	10
71	Kyle Scott	Port Elizabeth Police	2	0	0	0	10
71	Dudley Stead	Pirates	2	0	0	0	10
71	Divandré Strydom	Evergreens	2	0	0	0	10
71	Phumudzo Shepherd Tshiovhe	Pretoria Police	2	0	0	0	10
71	Ivan Venter	Pretoria Police	2	0	0	0	10
71	Arno Visagie	Bloemfontein Police	2	0	0	0	10
71	Ashley Wells	False Bay	2	0	0	0	10
71	Sheldon Williamson	Pirates	2	0	0	0	10
71	Fanelesibonge Sikhumbuzo Sifiso Zwane	Durban Collegians	2	0	0	0	10
116	Ridhaa Damon	False Bay	1	1	0	0	7
116	Sibulele Nanto	Durban Collegians	1	1	0	0	7
116	Lee-Roy Pojie	Evergreens	1	1	0	0	7
116	Gysbert van Wyk	Rustenburg Impala	1	1	0	0	7
120	Justin Peach	Port Elizabeth Police	0	3	0	0	6
121	Martin Scheepers	Pirates	1	0	0	0	5
121	Gurshwin Africa	Villagers Worcester	1	0	0	0	5
121	Donavan Ball	Bloemfontein Police	1	0	0	0	5
121	Werner Bekker	White River	1	0	0	0	5
121	Schalk Bergh	Windhoek Wanderers	1	0	0	0	5
121	Bradley Birkholtz	Old Selbornians	1	0	0	0	5
121	Johannes Botha	Brakpan	1	0	0	0	5
121	Kudu Botha	Windhoek Wanderers	1	0	0	0	5
121	Willem Botha	Northam Rhinos	1	0	0	0	5
121	Arend Brink	Durbanville-Bellville	1	0	0	0	5
121	Roy Bursey	Old Selbornians	1	0	0	0	5
121	Jackson Chabeli	Welkom Rovers	1	0	0	0	5
121	Fortunate Chipendu	Old Georgians	1	0	0	0	5
121	Eric Coates	East London Police	1	0	0	0	5
121	Theo Coetzee	Windhoek Wanderers	1	0	0	0	5
121	Willie Coetzee	False Bay	1	0	0	0	5
121	Rupert Cronjé	Bloemfontein Police	1	0	0	0	5
121	Jarrett Crouch	College Rovers	1	0	0	0	5
121	Kyle de Beer	Old Georgians	1	0	0	0	5
121	Tiaan Dippenaar	Sishen	1	0	0	0	5
121	Jandré du Plessis	Sishen	1	0	0	0	5
121	Sarel du Plessis	Sishen	1	0	0	0	5
121	Jovanian du Preez	Welkom Rovers	1	0	0	0	5
121	Mzivukile Duma	Rustenburg Impala	1	0	0	0	5
121	Wade Elliott	Durban Collegians	1	0	0	0	5
121	Frank Ferreira	Bloemfontein Police	1	0	0	0	5
121	Whelan Fortuin	Northam Rhinos	1	0	0	0	5
121	Craig Green	Old Selbornians	1	0	0	0	5
121	Moses Gunda	Old Georgians	1	0	0	0	5
121	Vince Gwavu	Pretoria Police	1	0	0	0	5
121	Johannes Harmzen	Northam Rhinos	1	0	0	0	5
121	Robbie Harris	Durban Collegians	1	0	0	0	5
121	Jacques Hattingh	Northam Rhinos	1	0	0	0	5
121	Andrew Holland	Durban Collegians	1	0	0	0	5
121	Hannes Huisamen	Port Elizabeth Police	1	0	0	0	5
121	Willem Petrus Janse van Rensburg	White River	1	0	0	0	5
121	Alwyn Jordaan	Port Elizabeth Police	1	0	0	0	5
121	Armandt Jordaan	Brakpan	1	0	0	0	5
121	Jamie Joseph	Windhoek Wanderers	1	0	0	0	5
121	Jason Kankowski	College Rovers	1	0	0	0	5
121	Shingirai Katsvere	Old Georgians	1	0	0	0	5
121	Chris Kemp	College Rovers	1	0	0	0	5
121	Enem Kritzinger	Windhoek Wanderers	1	0	0	0	5
121	Theunis Kruger	Pretoria Police	1	0	0	0	5
121	Christiaan Labuschagné	White River	1	0	0	0	5
121	Gideon Lambrechts	Evergreens	1	0	0	0	5
121	Kingsley Lang	Old Georgians	1	0	0	0	5
121	Len le Roux	Sishen	1	0	0	0	5
121	Oscar Limani	East London Police	1	0	0	0	5
121	Hlumelo Maku	East London Police	1	0	0	0	5
121	Carl Marks	Durban Collegians	1	0	0	0	5
121	Dieter Marquardt	Northam Rhinos	1	0	0	0	5
121	Tiaan Marx	White River	1	0	0	0	5
121	Charlton McCarthy	Sishen	1	0	0	0	5
121	Ricardo Menezes	Brakpan	1	0	0	0	5
121	Clint Miller	Evergreens	1	0	0	0	5
121	Bonga Mntunjani	East London Police	1	0	0	0	5
121	Jacques Moller	Brakpan	1	0	0	0	5
121	Malcolm Moore	Windhoek Wanderers	1	0	0	0	5
121	Tlhabane Johannes Motsepe	Pretoria Police	1	0	0	0	5
121	Theo Mynhardt	Brakpan	1	0	0	0	5
121	Luzuko Ndanda	Brakpan	1	0	0	0	5
121	Tiaan Nel	Rustenburg Impala	1	0	0	0	5
121	Edwardo Nell	Windhoek Wanderers	1	0	0	0	5
121	Lwazi Ngcungama	College Rovers	1	0	0	0	5
121	SJ Niemand	Pretoria Police	1	0	0	0	5
121	Lonwabo Ntlama	East London Police	1	0	0	0	5
121	Ruan Olivier	Welkom Rovers	1	0	0	0	5
121	Dylan Pieterse	Old Selbornians	1	0	0	0	5
121	Morné Rupert Prenn	Windhoek Wanderers	1	0	0	0	5
121	Jason Pretorius	False Bay	1	0	0	0	5
121	Odwa Rasmeni	East London Police	1	0	0	0	5
121	Francois Robbertse	Brakpan	1	0	0	0	5
121	Cheslyn Roberts	Durbanville-Bellville	1	0	0	0	5
121	Ronwin Roets	Brakpan	1	0	0	0	5
121	Michael Scheepers	College Rovers	1	0	0	0	5
121	Matthew Seba	Durban Collegians	1	0	0	0	5
121	Ben Sekgobela	Pirates	1	0	0	0	5
121	Manuel Senoge	East London Police	1	0	0	0	5
121	Denys Snyman	White River	1	0	0	0	5
121	Phillip Spies	Bloemfontein Police	1	0	0	0	5
121	Ryan Sprake	Old Georgians	1	0	0	0	5
121	Justin St Jerry	Rustenburg Impala	1	0	0	0	5
121	Louwrens Strydom	Sishen	1	0	0	0	5
121	Pieter Strydom	Pretoria Police	1	0	0	0	5
121	Luzandré Swarts	Bloemfontein Police	1	0	0	0	5
121	Sheldon Terblanché	Pirates	1	0	0	0	5
121	Gideon Thiart	Durbanville-Bellville	1	0	0	0	5
121	Curtley Timm	Villagers Worcester	1	0	0	0	5
121	Viljoen van der Linde	Sishen	1	0	0	0	5
121	Maverick van der Merwe	Rustenburg Impala	1	0	0	0	5
121	Hugo van der Poll	Sishen	1	0	0	0	5
121	Mario van Rooyen	Sishen	1	0	0	0	5
121	LC van Tonder	Welkom Rovers	1	0	0	0	5
121	Jowayne van Wyk	Villagers Worcester	1	0	0	0	5
121	Jacques Vermaak	Durbanville-Bellville	1	0	0	0	5
121	Le Roux Viljoen	College Rovers	1	0	0	0	5
121	Daniel Vosloo	Port Elizabeth Police	1	0	0	0	5
121	Raydall Walters	Brakpan	1	0	0	0	5
121	Rayno Wasserman	Pretoria Police	1	0	0	0	5
121	DG Wiese	Windhoek Wanderers	1	0	0	0	5
121	Francois Wiese	Windhoek Wanderers	1	0	0	0	5
121	Denzel Willemse	Durbanville-Bellville	1	0	0	0	5
121	Aden Williams	East London Police	1	0	0	0	5
225	Eldred James	White River	0	2	0	0	4
225	Leon Andrew Mauer	Old Selbornians	0	2	0	0	4
227	C-Than Moos	Evergreens	0	0	1	0	3
227	Shaun Nieuwenhuyzen	Welkom Rovers	0	0	1	0	3
229	Yazeed Johnson	Villagers Worcester	0	1	0	0	2
229	Mondli Nkosi	Durban Collegians	0	1	0	0	2
—	penalty try	Durbanville-Bellville	1	0	0	0	5
—	penalty try	Pirates	1	0	0	0	5
—	penalty try	Pretoria Police	1	0	0	0	5
* Legend: T = Tries, C = Conversions, P = Penalties, DG = Drop Goals, Pts = Points.

== Referees ==
The following referees officiated matches in the 2016 Gold Cup:

2016 Currie Cup Premier Division referees
Referees	Mike Adamson • Nathan Barry • Blake Beattie • Johre Botha • JP Clements • Darren Colby • Griffon Colby • JD de Meyer • Morné Ferreira • Stephan Geldenhuys • Jacky Husselman • Craig Joubert • Danie Koen • Jaco Kotze • Pro Legoete • Pieter Maritz • Mpho Matsaung • Paul Mente • Sinethemba Mrulwa • Vusi Msibi • Julian Mundawarara • Shemeah Mushiribindi • Eduan Nel • Sindile Ngcese • Jaco Pretorius • Oregopotse Rametsi • Rasta Rasivhenge • Archie Sehlako • Nathan Swartz • Divan Uys • Lourens van der Merwe • Jaco van Heerden
