= Hannes Huisamen =

South African rugby union player

- Full name: Johannes Frederik Huisamen
- Born: 9 April 1989 (age 37) Malmesbury, South Africa
- Height: 1.98 m (6 ft 6 in)
- Weight: 107 kg (236 lb; 16 st 12 lb)
- School: Brandwag HS, Uitenhage
- University: University of Stellenbosch and Nelson Mandela University

Rugby union career
- Position: Lock
Amateur team(s)
Years	Team	Apps	(Points)
2012–2014	NMMU Madibaz		
2015–2016	Port Elizabeth Police		
Senior career
Years	Team	Apps	(Points)
2018–	Eastern Province Kings	5	(0)
- Correct as of 27 March 2022

Johannes Frederik Huisamen (born 9 April 1989) is a South African rugby union player who plays for the Eastern Province Elephants in the Currie Cup and the Rugby Challenge. His regular position is lock.

== Rugby career ==
Huisamen was born in Malmesbury, but grew up in the Eastern Cape. He was included in the NMMU Madibaz squads for the 2012, 2013 and 2014 Varsity Cup competition, and played for Port Elizabeth Police in the Gold Cup in 2015 (when it was known as the Community Cup) and 2016.

In 2016, Huisamen was named in the Eastern Province Kings squad for the Currie Cup Premier Division. He made his first class debut by starting in the Kings' match against Griquas in Kimberley, and made a second appearance as a replacement in their home match against the Free State Cheetahs just four days later.
