= Malcolm Moore (rugby union, born 1992) =

Namibia international rugby union player

- Full name: Malcolm Edwin Moore
- Born: 13 October 1992 (age 34) Windhoek, Namibia
- Height: 1.83 m (6 ft 0 in)
- Weight: 87 kg (13 st 10 lb; 192 lb)
- School: Windhoek Gymnasium

Rugby union career
- Position: Winger
- Current team: Welwitschias
Youth career
- 2009–2010: Namibia Under-18
- 2011–2012: Pumas
Amateur team(s)
Years	Team	Apps	(Points)
2016	Windhoek Wanderers	3	(5)
Senior career
Years	Team	Apps	(Points)
2015–2016	Welwitschias	8	(15)
- Correct as of 30 November 2016
International career
Years	Team	Apps	(Points)
2013–2016	Namibia	3	(0)
- Correct as of 30 November 2016

Malcolm Edwin Moore (born 13 October 1992) is a Namibian rugby union player, currently playing with the Namibia national team and the Welwitschias in the South African Currie Cup competition. He usually plays as a winger.

== Rugby career ==
Moore was born in Windhoek. He was selected to represent Namibia at Under-18 level in 2009 and 2010, before joining South African side the Pumas for 2011 and 2012, playing for them at Under-19 and Under-21 level. He made his test debut for Namibia in July 2013 against Tunisia, but tested positively for banned substance methylhexaneamine during the match. He incurred a six-month ban from rugby union, effective from July 2013 until January 2014. He made further appearances for Namibia in 2014 and 2016.

He also represented the Welwitschias in the South African domestic Vodacom Cup and Currie Cup competitions since 2015, and also represented club side Windhoek Wanderers in the 2016 Gold Cup.
