= Boyd Rouse =

Zimbabwean rugby union player

- Born: 29 October 1993 (age 33) Zimbabwe
- Height: 1.79 m (5 ft 10 in)
- Weight: 94 kg (207 lb)

Rugby union career
- Position: Fly-half / Centre
Senior career
Years	Team	Apps	(Points)
2022	Zimbabwe Goshawks	1	(3)
- Correct as of 3 April 2022
National sevens team
Years	Team		Comps
2013–	Zimbabwe Sevens		9
- Correct as of 3 April 2022

Boyd Rouse (born 29 October 1993) is a Zimbabwean rugby union and rugby sevens player who has represented Zimbabwe internationally in both formats. He primarily plays as a fly-half or centre. Rouse captained the Zimbabwe national rugby sevens team at the 2018 Rugby World Cup Sevens and later captained Zimbabwe at the final men's qualification tournament for the Tokyo Olympics in 2021.

== International career ==
Rouse made his senior international rugby union debut for the Zimbabwe national team in July 2013 against Madagascar. Playing at fly-half, he scored a drop goal as Zimbabwe came from behind to win the match. Rouse has also represented Zimbabwe extensively in rugby sevens. He made his World Rugby Sevens Series debut in Port Elizabeth, South Africa, in 2013. He subsequently appeared in World Series qualifying tournaments in 2015, 2016, 2018 and 2019. He represented Zimbabwe at the final qualification tournament for the 2016 Summer Olympics, scoring a try against Ireland. In 2018, Rouse was selected as captain of Zimbabwe for the 2018 Rugby World Cup Sevens in San Francisco. It was his first Rugby World Cup Sevens appearance. At the time of the tournament he was listed as playing club rugby for Bury St Edmunds in England. In June 2021, Rouse was again appointed captain of Zimbabwe for the final men's Olympic qualification tournament in Monaco. World Rugby described him as the most experienced member of a Zimbabwe squad containing several players who had yet to make a World Rugby Sevens Series appearance. His World Rugby tournament profile listed him with three World Series events, seven Series points and one Series try.

== Club career ==
Rouse played club rugby for Old Georgians in Zimbabwe. In 2016, he played at centre as Old Georgians defeated Old Hararians 39–17 to qualify for South Africa's inaugural Gold Cup competition. Rouse scored two tries in the match. He was subsequently named in the Old Georgians squad for the 2016 Gold Cup. By the 2018 Rugby World Cup Sevens, Rouse was listed by World Rugby as playing for Bury St Edmunds in England. He was again listed as an Old Georgians player in World Rugby's 2021 Olympic repechage tournament profile. Rouse was named in the Zimbabwe Goshawks squad for the 2022 Currie Cup First Division. He appeared at fly-half during the campaign, including in matches against the Griffons and Boland Cavaliers.

== Professional career ==
Rouse was named in the Zimbabwe Goshawks squad for the 2022 Currie Cup First Division. He has also represented Zimbabwe in rugby sevens.
