= Graham Knoop =

South African rugby union player

- Born: 1987 (age 38–39)
- Height: 1.92 m (6 ft 3 1/2 in)
- Weight: 105 kg (231 lb)

Rugby union career
- Position: Blindside Flanker
Amateur team(s)
| Years | Team | Apps | (Points) |
| 2010–2021 | False Bay | | |
| 2012 | UCT Ikey Tigers | | |
Provincial / State sides
| Years | Team | Apps | (Points) |
| – | Western Province | | |

Graham Knoop (born 1987) is a South African former rugby player and current coach.

== Early life and education ==
Knoop attended Western Province Preparatory School (WPPS) for his junior education.

== Playing career ==
Knoop's playing career included professional, provincial, and club rugby. He played as a blindside flanker for Ospreys in Wales, and had a lengthy club career with False Bay. At club level, he played for False Bay from 2010 to 2021, where he served as captain for their 2016 league and 2017 Gold Cup victories and he was named South African Club Player of the Year 2017. He also appeared for the UCT Ikey Tigers in the 2012 Varsity Cup.

== Coaching career ==
After retiring from playing, Knoop moved into coaching. He has coached the U19 1st XV teams at Bishops, SACS, and Wynberg Boys' High School.

In 2022, he was appointed forwards coach for the Zimbabwe Sables. During his tenure, the team rose in the World Rugby Rankings. He played a significant role in the team's participation in the Africa Cup and the 2023 World Cup qualifiers.

Since 2023, Knoop has served as head coach of the Florida-based rugby team, the Pelicans, leading them to state finals in 2023, 2024 and 2025 .
