= Tythan Adams =

South African rugby union player

- Full name: Tythan Franco Adams
- Born: 31 August 1990 (age 36) Vredenburg, South Africa
- Height: 1.75 m (5 ft 9 in)
- Weight: 82 kg (181 lb; 12 st 13 lb)
- School: Paul Roos Gymnasium, Stellenbosch
- University: University of Stellenbosch

Rugby union career
- Position: Wing
- Current team: Griquas
Youth career
- 2006–2011: Western Province
Senior career
Years	Team	Apps	(Points)
2012	SWD Eagles	1	(0)
2013	Boland Cavaliers	8	(10)
2017	Sharks (Currie Cup)	2	(0)
2018–present	Griquas	6	(10)
- Correct as of 27 October 2018
International career
Years	Team	Apps	(Points)
2008	South Africa Schools		
- Correct as of 25 August 2018

Tythan Franco Adams (born 31 August 1990) is a South African rugby union player for Griquas in the Currie Cup and the Rugby Challenge. His regular position is wing.
