= Kingsley Lang =

Zimbabwean rugby union player (born 1988)

- Born: February 29, 1988 (age 38)
- Height: 1.88 m (6 ft 2 in)
- Weight: 102 kg (225 lb)

Rugby union career
- Position: Flanker
Senior career
Years	Team	Apps	(Points)
- Stingrays
2010–2011	Bury RUFC		
2011–2012	Jersey		
International career
Years	Team	Apps	(Points)
- Zimbabwe

Kinsgley Lang (born 29 February 1988) is a Zimbabwean rugby union player. He plays as a flanker.

Lang started his career in Zimbabwe, moving afterwards to Australia, where he played for Sunshine Coast Stingrays, from Brisbane, until 2009/10. He moved to Bury St Edmunds RUFC for 2010/11, and after to Jersey, where he plays, since 2011/12. He played at the British and Irish Cup.

He is an international player for Zimbabwe. At present, he works for De La Salle College as a sports teacher.
