= Tyson Mulamba =

Congolese rugby union player (born 1982)

- Full name: Patrick Lukiki Mulamba
- Born: 3 May 1982 (age 44) Kinshasa, Zaire
- Height: 1.82 m (5 ft 11 1/2 in)
- Weight: 105 kg (231 lb; 16 st 7 lb)
- School: Bracken High School, Alberton
- University: University of Johannesburg

Rugby union career
- Position: Prop
- Current team: Golden Lions
Amateur team(s)
Years	Team	Apps	(Points)
2013	Raiders	4	(5)
Senior career
Years	Team	Apps	(Points)
2008–2009	Border Bulldogs	27	(15)
2010	Mighty Elephants	0	(0)
2014–present	Golden Lions	3	(0)
- Correct as of 16 February 2015
- Correct as of 16 February 2015

Patrick Lukiki 'Tyson' Mulamba (born 3 May 1982 in Kinshasa, Zaire) is a Congolese rugby union player, currently playing with South Africa side the Golden Lions. His regular position is prop.

== Career ==
=== Border Bulldogs ===
Mulamba started his provincial career with the Border Bulldogs, joining the East London-based side prior to the 2008 Vodacom Cup. He was an unused reserve in their opening match of the competition against Griquas, but made his first class debut a week later when he played off the bench in the Bulldogs' 27–41 defeat to the Griffons in Welkom. After another substitute appearance against the Falcons, he made his first senior start against the Pumas in Witbank in an 11–53 loss.

He was also involved in the Bulldogs' 2008 Currie Cup First Division season; he made his Currie Cup debut off the bench against the Griffons in Round Two of the competition, but then established himself as the first-choice loosehead prop for the Bulldogs, starting seven of their remaining eight matches. He also scored his first senior try in a 45–40 victory against the Pumas during that competition, following that up with a second try the following week against the Mighty Elephants in Port Elizabeth.

He made a further six starts during the 2009 Vodacom Cup competition – once against scoring a try against the Mighty Elephants in a 34–14 victory in Port Elizabeth – and made eight starts during the 2009 Currie Cup First Division as the Bulldogs finished fifth out of six teams.

=== Mighty Elephants ===
In 2010, Mulamba made the move from East London to Port Elizabeth to join the Mighty Elephants. He was included in their squad for the 2010 Vodacom Cup, but failed to make any appearances. In April 2010, he was released by the province to join amateur club side Zwide.

=== Raiders / Golden Lions ===
Mulamba returned to Gauteng and joined club side Raiders. Raiders qualified for the inaugural SARU Community Cup competition in 2013, with Mulamba starting all four of their matches and scoring a try in their derby match against Roodepoort in a 24–27 defeat.

He made a return to provincial rugby during the 2014 Vodacom Cup, making a single appearance for the Golden Lions during the 2014 Vodacom Cup in a 40–37 victory over the Griffons. He was named in their squad for the 2014 Currie Cup Premier Division, but failed to make an appearance.
