= 1993 Northern Transvaal Currie Cup season =

Rugby union competition season

1993 Currie Cup
- Countries: South Africa
- Champions: Transvaal
- Runners-up: Natal

The Northern Transvaal rugby union team competed in the 1993 Currie Cup tournament in South Africa. The team came in 4th out of 6 teams.

== Northern Transvaal results in the 1993 Currie cup ==
1993 Northern Transvaal results
| game No. | Northern Transvaal points | Opponent points | Opponent | date | Venue | Result | Match notes |
|---|---|---|---|---|---|---|---|
| 1 | 34 | 20 | Free State | 29 May 1993 | Loftus Versfeld, Pretoria | Northern Transvaal won | |
| 2 | 15 | 37 | Eastern Province | 10 July 1993 | Boet Erasmus Stadium, Port Elizabeth | Northern Transvaal lost | |
| 3 | 16 | 19 | Transvaal | 17 July 1993 | Loftus Versfeld, Pretoria | Northern Transvaal lost | |
| 4 | 20 | 40 | Natal | 24 July 1993 | King's Park, Durban | Northern Transvaal lost | |
| 5 | 29 | 37 | Free State | 31 July 1993 | Loftus Versfeld, Pretoria | Northern Transvaal lost | |
| 6 | 27 | 14 | Western Province | 21 August 1993 | Cape Town | Northern Transvaal won | |
| 7 | 18 | 12 | Eastern Province | 4 September 1993 | Loftus Versfeld, Pretoria | Northern Transvaal won | |
| 8 | 13 | 36 | Transvaal | 11 September 1993 | Ellispark, Johannesburg | Northern Transvaal lost | |
| 9 | 26 | 30 | Natal | 25 September 1993 | Loftus Versfeld, Pretoria | Northern Transvaal lost | |
| 10 | 27 | 18 | Free State | 2 October 1993 | Bloemfontein | Northern Transvaal won | |

- Northern Transvaal did not qualify for the 1993 Currie Cup final.

== Statistics ==
=== 1993 Currie cup log position ===
1993 Currie Cup Log
| | Team | Played | Won | Drawn | Lost | Points For | Points Against | Points Difference | Tries For | Tries Against | Points |
| 4th | Northern Transvaal | 10 | 4 | 0 | 6 | 225 | 263 | -38 | 20 | 26 | 8 |

=== 1988 - 1993 results summary (including play off matches) ===
| Period | Games | Won | Drawn | Lost | Win % | Points for | Average PF | Points against | 40-49 pts | 50-99 pts | 100+ pts | Best score | Worst score against |
|---|---|---|---|---|---|---|---|---|---|---|---|---|---|
| 1988–1993 | 76 | 56 | 2 | 18 | 73.68% | 2097 | 27.59 | 1381 | 5 | 5 | 0 | 71-3 vs South West Africa (1989) | 54-15 vs Natal (1991) |
