= Izak Van Heerden =

South African rugby union player & coach

Izak van Heerden (August 1910 – June 1973 (aged 62–63)) was a South African rugby union coach, and player, remembered for his successes with the Argentina national team and the Natal Province team for his unconventional, fast-moving style. His tactical innovations have had lasting influence on the game of rugby.

== Biography ==
Van Heerden was born in Utrecht, KwaZulu-Natal, in 1910.

Van Heerden qualified as a teacher in Pietermaritzburg at the Natal University College (now the University of KwaZulu-Natal). While there he had moderate success playing at loose forward for the University team in 1934. He then became a school master at Durban High School, where he taught Afrikaans. He coached the school rugby team with such success that he soon gained wide attention for his skills.

During World War II, Van Heerden served as a gunner in North Africa, where he was taken prisoner at Benghazi along with another well-known Durban High School schoolmaster and rugby coach, Bill Payn. Van Heerden was interned in prisoner-of-war camps in North Africa and then in Italy. He escaped from a camp near Rome and evaded capture for nine months in the surrounding hills, until rescued by British forces He returned to teaching and coaching after the War and was appointed coach of the Natal provincial team. Whatever Van Heerden had lacked in physical prowess in rugby, he made up for by his tactical brilliance.

=== Coaching Natal ===
Van Heerden was known for arriving at Natal training sessions directly from school, often still dressed in his school attire, which included glasses, a tweed jacket or dark suit, and a bow tie. This characteristic behavior was viewed favorably by some observers and less positively by others. He was described as a large and physically imposing individual, with a manner noted for humor and wit, as well as a temper and a tendency to use strong language in both academic and sporting settings.

He was a successful coach and trained many prominent players. Amongst the South African players who passed through his hands were Tommy Bedford, Keith Oxlee, Trix Truter and Snowy Suter.

But Van Heerden's success with Natal was only a foretaste of what was to come.

=== Coaching Argentina ===
Van Heerden's reputation as an innovative coach had spread to Argentina, and he was invited to Buenos Aires to help the Pumas prepare for their first visit to South Africa in 1965. Despite Argentina faring badly in this tour, it was the start of a long and happy relationship between Van Heerden and the Pumas. Izak van Heerden took leave from his teaching post in Durban, relocated to Argentina, learnt fluent Spanish, and would revolutionise Argentine play in the late 1960s, laying the way open for great players such as Hugo Porta. Van Heerden virtually invented the "tight loose" form of play, an area in which the Argentines would come to excel, and which would become a hallmark of their playing style. The Pumas repaid the initial debt, by beating the Junior Springboks at Ellis Park, and emerged as one of the better modern rugby nations, thanks largely to the talents of this Durban schoolmaster.

Van Heerden's fame grew elsewhere as a result, particularly in the British Isles, where reports filtered through about the rugby "guru" with the golden touch. Somehow his growing reputation worked against him in South Africa, and other than one series against the British and Irish Lions in 1962, in which the Lions were comprehensively outplayed (losing 3–0), Van Heerden's massive input was not required. Possibly The fact that he had never been a Springbok meant that later on, he was passed over as a choice to coach the national side, because it was wrongly assumed that good players and good coaches were one and the same.

After his coaching career, Van Heerden went back to teach at Durban High School, where he was eventually promoted to vice-principal. He died suddenly in his office at the school in 1973.

== Legacy ==
Kitch Christie, who coached the Springboks for the 1995 Rugby World Cup, was quoted as saying Izak van Heerden "was truly light years ahead of the rest." Christie openly acknowledged Izak van Heerden's influence on him, and to using his thinking as a blueprint for his own team, saying "Most of what you hear the modern coaches saying, and the phrases they use, were first coined by Izak."

Tommy Bedford, who captained Natal and the Springboks in the 1960s, recalled that "Izak van Heerden was streets ahead of his time...We had a genius as a coach. He sought players with two great qualities: an ability to think, and the flair to make decisions on the field... His teams played this instinctive, fantastic, expressive brand of rugby...His great philosophy was that the ball was the advantage. He taught us to treat every piece of possession like a nugget, and he would say, no one kicks a nugget away...the most important thing is to keep the ball."

Van Heerden's masterpiece, Thinking Rugby, has become a coaching Bible around the world. Several of the strategies he devised during his rise to prominence, when he masterminded Natal's victory over Australia in 1953, have become parts of the modern high-speed, high-intensity game. Richard Bath describes him as "the thinking man's coach." Van Heerden also wrote Coaching, Practising and Training for Tries (Durban: Drakensburg Press, 1966), and Tactical and Attacking Rugby (Wellington: Reed, 1967).

Van Heerden's greatest legacy, perhaps, was to turn the Pumas into a truly respected national side. The performance of the team under Van Heerden is cited as a standard for the potential of the Argentine national side, the Pumas. This assessment persists despite fluctuations in the team's overall competitive results. Argentina was already the rugby power in South America when Izak van Heerden came along, but he propelled them into a completely different orbit from their neighbours in Chile, Uruguay and elsewhere. More than half a century later, in 2015, twenty-four past and current Puma team members visited Durban High School to honor the coach who had transformed their game.

A rugby pitch at the school is named after him.

== See also ==
- Skonk Nicholson, another well known rugby coach from Maritzburg College.
- Cecil (Bill) Payn, a fellow POW, rugby coach, and teacher at Durban High School.
