= Sharks (rugby union) =

South African rugby union club, based in Durban

(South Africa) Sharks
- Full name: The Sharks
- Union: South African Rugby Union
- Emblem: Shark
- Founded: 1890
- Location: Durban, KwaZulu-Natal, South Africa
- Region: KwaZulu-Natal
- Ground: Kings Park Stadium (46,000 capacity)
- CEO: Shaun Bryans
- President: Graham Mackenzie
- Director of Rugby: Neil Powell
- Coach(es): JP Pietersen (URC & ERCC); Mike Vowles (CC)
- Captain(s): André Esterhuizen (URC & ERCC); Thomas Dyer (CC)
- Most appearances: Jacques Botes (271)
- Top scorer: Curwin Bosch (1320)
- Most tries: Lwazi Mvovo (73)
- League(s): United Rugby Championship; European Rugby Champions Cup; Currie Cup
- 2025–26 & 2026: 2025–26 URC Playoffs: DNQ; South African Shield: 2nd 10th overall 2026 CC; 5th overall
1st kit	2nd kit

Official website
- sharksrugby.co.za
- Current season

The Sharks (known as the Hollywoodbets Sharks for sponsorship reasons) is a South African professional rugby union team based in Durban in KwaZulu-Natal. They compete in the United Rugby Championship and are eligible to compete in either the Investec Champions Cup or EPCR Challenge Cup depending on qualification. They previously competed in the Super Rugby competition until 2020. The team also competes in the Currie Cup as the Sharks XV.

The team previously also competed as Natal, the Natal Sharks, and most recently the Sharks XV. The Sharks as Natal reached the Super 10 final in 1994, as well as the finals of Super Rugby on four occasions. Once as Natal in 1996, and three times as the Sharks in 2001, 2007, and 2012. Though they never won the title. To date, their best performance in the United Rugby Championship is reaching the semi-finals in the 2024–25 URC Season and winning the South African conference shield in the same season. In May 2024, they won their first major competition by winning the 2023–24 EPCR Challenge Cup, becoming the first South African team to win a European trophy.

The team is the fourth most successful provincial union in the Currie Cup, having won the competition nine times. Natal won its first Currie Cup in 1990, the same year the union celebrated its centenary. Since then the Sharks have won the Currie Cup in 1992, 1995, 1996, 2008, 2010, 2013, 2018 and most recently in 2024.

KwaZulu-Natal Rugby are a minority owner of the Sharks franchise, while MVM Holdings are the majority owners with 51% of the voting rights.

The Sharks play their home matches at the Kings Park Stadium in Durban, while also utilizing other local stadiums such as Woodburn Stadium in Petermaritzburg or Sugar Ray Xulu Stadium in Clermont.

== History ==
=== Early history ===
The Natal Rugby Union, renamed the KwaZulu-Natal Rugby Union (KZNRU) in 1999 was formed in 1890, but it took 66 years for the union to reach its first Currie Cup final. In the interim, the province produced quality players including Springboks Bill Payn, Wally Clarkson and Philip Nel, who led South Africa on the country's unbeaten tour of Australia and New Zealand in 1937. While the 1920s and 30s saw Natal improve from one of the weakest unions in the Currie Cup to becoming a more competitive mid-table team, the team still struggled against quality sides such as Western Province and Transvaal.

=== 1920–1990: The years of pain ===
Natal did not enjoy any success prior to the 1960s, although legendary coach Izak van Heerden did manage to fashion two unbeaten seasons in '61 and '63, when the Currie Cup competition was not held. The 1956 final saw Natal up against Northern Transvaal and even though it was contested at Kingsmead in Durban, 9–8 was the score in favour of the men from Pretoria. With so many Springbok test matches in the early 1960s, the Currie Cup was contested only four times in that decade. Natal failed to make an impression, despite being able to call on the likes of Springboks Ormond Taylor and Keith Oxlee. But the province did succeed in building its own unique style of rugby, thanks to the coaching by Van Heerden. Van Heerden, who coached Natal from the late 1950s into the 1960s, fostered a brand of rugby that placed emphasis on ball retention and the interplay of forwards and backs to produce try-scoring opportunities. Nonetheless, Natal saw very little success in the 1970s, until the arrival of Wynand Claassen from Pretoria in late 1979. What followed was a rare third-place finish in the Currie Cup in 1980, with Claassen receiving inspirational support from Welshman Roger Gardner and former Wallaby Mark Loane. The standout result was a 22–19 defeat of Northern Transvaal – Natal's first win over Northern's at Loftus Versfeld in 41 years. Northern Transvaal went on to win the Currie Cup again that year, but Natal was the only side to get the better of them.

=== 1981–1985: Relegation to Section B ===
During the 80s, Natal could call on players of the calibre of Gawie Visagie, Henry Coxwell, Rob Hankinson and Mort Mortassagne, but relegation to the B-Section followed in '81. The side made up for this in 1984 by qualifying for the Currie Cup final, despite plying their trade in the B-Section. That was after a semi-final victory over Free State, thanks to two tries from Des McLean and one each from Derek la Marque and Claassen. The "Banana Boys" gave a good account of themselves in the 1984 final, but Western Province ended up winning 19–9 at Newlands in Cape Town. For much of the 1980s, Natal was written off as a B-Section team punching above their weight. It was not until the arrival of legendary coach Ian McIntosh from Zimbabwe and the return to the A-Section in 1987 that they started to lay the foundations for success in the 1990s.

=== 1986–1990: Return to Section A and first Currie Cup title ===
After arriving in 1986, McIntosh quickly made his mark in Durban and spent the late 1980s building a squad and recruiting players he felt would serve the greater good of Natal Rugby. That culminated in a dream 1990 Currie Cup season, which saw Natal sweep aside just about all before them, with only a heavy round-robin defeat to Northern Transvaal playing on their minds as they traveled north to face the same opponents in the final. Despite Natal's great season, the men from Pretoria were heavily favoured to win, particularly in front of a partisan home crowd that had become accustomed to Currie Cup success. And with match-winning flyhalf Naas Botha at the helm, it was widely accepted that the Blue Bulls just had to show up to win. But, in one of the biggest upsets in the history of the competition, McIntosh's side turned the tables and edged out their more-fancied opponents 18–12, after a match-winning try from flying winger Tony Watson. The victorious side was captained by scrumhalf Craig Jamieson, who led the team on a ticker-tape parade through central Durban later in the week. The victory was especially poignant for being both Natal's first, and for occurring in the union's centenary year. Players from that history-making team included fullback Hugh Reece-Edwards and centres Dick Muir and Jeremy Thomson. But the hard work was done upfront by Gerhard Harding, Tom Lawton and Guy Kebble in the front row, backed up by the lock pairing of Andre Botha and Rudi Visagie, flank Wahl Bartmann and eighth man Andrew Aitken. McIntosh produced a masterstroke by naming regular lock Steve Atherton on the flank just minutes before kick-off. It resulted in what was arguably Natal's heaviest-ever scrum and laid the platform for the Durban side to put the required pressure on Blue Bulls scrumhalf Robert du Preez and Botha.

=== 1990–1999: Team of the Decade and the rise of the Sharks ===
Their 1990 victory was the catalyst for further Currie Cup success, as McIntosh set about ensuring continuity that culminated in Natal being labelled the "team of the ‘90s" a decade later. During this time, the province also recruited wisely, with the likes of Du Preez, fullback Andre Joubert, flyhalf Henry Honiball, centre Pieter Muller, and prop Ollie le Roux, all making the trip to Durban. Another acquisition was flanker Bartmann from Transvaal, and 1992 saw him lead Natal to a second Currie Cup triumph – this time away from home. Francois Pienaar's Transvaal unit were defeated 14–13 in the final at Ellis Park. A 21–15 Currie Cup final defeat to the same opponents followed in 1993 – a loss that was made all the more difficult because it took place in front of an expectant home crowd at Kings Park, but the newly branded Sharks were back in the winner's circle just two years later. By then, players such as locks Mark Andrews and Atherton, hooker John Allan, eighth man Gary Teichmann, prop Adrian Garvey, wing Cabous van der Westhuizen, and scrumhalf Kevin Putt were all household names, and either current, or future Springbok stars. Making the most of a memorable World Cup year which saw the Springboks claim a first world title, McIntosh also recruited Frenchmen Olivier Roumat and Thierry Lacroix to bolster what was already a talented squad. It proved a masterstroke, with the big lock and flyhalf playing important roles in the 1995 final victory over Western Province in Durban. The final score was 25–17, with the Sharks being able to celebrate a third Currie Cup success in six years, with the likes of legendary fullback Joubert now entering their prime, along with a new crop of Sharks heroes in the form of flank Wayne Fyvie, and prop Robbi Kempson. Further success followed in 1996, with Natal securing their first back-to-back Currie Cup titles. Such was their dominance in that year that McIntosh's side was able to travel away to Ellis Park, and convincingly beat Transvaal 33–15, with Joubert grabbing the man-of-the-match award with a two-try performance. It was surprising then that the team from Durban had to wait until 1999 to contest another final, with the likes of Western Province, the Free State Cheetahs, and the Northern Transvaal once again coming into their own, towards the end of the 1990s, but it was Transvaal, now renamed the Golden Lions, that would cause Natal Currie Cup heartache, as they pitched up in Durban, and handed the four-time champions a 32–9 hiding in the 1999 final, with Lions fullback Thinus Delport scoring twice in the match-winning performance. Despite the best efforts of their rising star, under-21 flyhallf Cobus Gomes, who kicked 3 penalties. and scored what was arguably the try of the season, only to have it reversed due to ill-discipline in the scrum prior to the line break, that signaled the end of an era, with McIntosh, the captain Teichmann, Honiball and Joubert, all announcing their retirements.

In 1995, the team rebranded as the Natal Sharks. This name remained in use until the advent of the franchise era in Super Rugby in 1998, when the team became known as the Coastal Sharks. This marked a formal distinction between the franchise team competing in Super Rugby and the provincial team participating in the Currie Cup, which remained as the Natal Sharks and now known as the Sharks XV too keep that distinction.

=== 2000s: Growing International Influence ===
With Rudolf Straeuli now at the helm and future Springbok captain John Smit at the forefront of a Sharks revival, they were able to overcome those huge losses and qualify for the 2000 final. But Western Province was too strong at Kings Park in Durban, as The Sharks went down by 25 points to 15. It was a case of deja vu just 12 months later, but this time at Newlands in Cape Town. The score was 29–24 on that occasion, as Western Province enjoyed a period of dominance over their coastal rivals from Durban. The Sharks bounced back to feature in the 2003 final, but a heavy 40–19 Currie Cup final defeat to the Blue Bulls in Pretoria followed and that was to signal the start of a barren period for the province. It was not until 2008, with New Zealander John Plumtree in charge, that The Sharks were able to break the curse and once again claim Currie Cup glory. Northern Transvaal, by now renamed the Blue Bulls, were their opponents in the final, and this time the Kings Park faithful were treated to a gutsy Sharks performance that culminated in an edgy 14–9 victory. It was the fifth Currie Cup title, and like the 1995 final, a French connection in the guise of Frédéric Michalak would again be involved for The Sharks and, with quality young players such as Ruan Pienaar, Rory Kockott, Beast Mtawarira, JP Pietersen, Bismarck du Plessis, Keegan Daniel and Ryan Kankowski in their ranks, the portents for success are clearly present.

=== 2010s: Becoming a Force to be Reckoned with ===
Many of the above-mentioned players, along with some of the stalwarts like John Smit, Stefan Terblanche and Jacques Botes, together with a few new recruits like Willem Alberts and Louis Ludik, and new talent coming through the Sharks Academy made good in 2010 as the team regained the Absa Currie Cup trophy after another successful domestic season. Having finished the pool stages of the tournament at the top of the log, they dispatched of the Blue Bulls in the semi-final and then comprehensively beat Western Province 30–10 in the final – both matches taking place in front of home crowds at The Shark Tank. Young Patrick Lambie was the star of the show, earning the coveted Man of the Match award with his 25 individual points' haul and he, along with Keegan Daniel, Lwazi Mvovo, Willem Alberts and Charl McLeod all went on to gain Springbok honours at the end of the year. The Sharks reached their third final in four years when they finished second on the login 2011, with the Lions finishing top. The Lions had not won a trophy since beating the Sharks in the 1999 Currie Cup final. Despite the odds, a fired-up Lions side emulated the feat of their predecessors of 12 years previously (the Sharks had also suffered a 12-year drought, winning in 1996 and then again in 2008) and ran out winners at a packed Ellis Park in Johannesburg, defeating The Sharks and emerge 2011 Currie Cup champions. It was a similar scenario in 2012 when The Sharks managed, again, to reach the Currie Cup final, hosting it again as they had succeeded in 2008 and 2010. All the signs suggested that they would emulate those feats, but sadly it was Western Province who broke their own 11-year trophy drought in a tight final at Kings Park, with Juan de Jongh dancing through the Sharks defence in the 36th minute to score what would become the match-winning try. The final score was 25–18 in favour of Western Province. However, The Sharks were not to be denied in 2013 when matters were reversed. The final pool match pitted The Sharks and Western Province against one another at Kings Park, the teams one and two on the log. The winner of that match would finish top and thus earn the right to host the final, should they get through. Western Province won 17–13 and finished top of the Currie Cup log, with the Sharks in the second position. Both teams successfully negotiated their way through the semi-finals, Western Province defeated the Golden Lions 33–16 and The Sharks victorious over Free State – 33–22. The 2013 Currie Cup final was held on 26 October 2013 at Newlands in Cape Town. The home side were overwhelming favourites having beaten the Sharks in both pool matches during the season. It was typical derby stuff; a massive clash between the two best teams in the tournament. But it appeared that The Sharks were hungrier. They hit the rucks with greater passion; they smashed Province in the tackles and took their chances to emerge worthy 33–19 victors, holding out against a late, but ultimately ineffective charge from the home side to be crowned 2013 champions – their third title and fifth final in the tournament since 2008.

=== Franchise History ===
The Sharks currently field multiple teams across different levels of competition. The Sharks' participation in international club rugby began with the teams participation in the 1993 Super 10. Since then they have competed in Super Rugby, the United Rugby Championship, Investec Champions Cup and EPCR Challenge Cup, along with several other smaller tournaments.

Originally, the Sharks Franchise was fully administered by the Natal Rugby Union, except for the period from 1998 to 2005, when the Eastern Cape rugby unions played a limited role in the governance of the Super Rugby franchise. In 1999, a move toward private ownership began when SuperSport acquired a 40% stake in the new commercial division established by union for R48 million.

In 2005, the franchise's Eastern Cape partners withdrew, leaving the Sharks aligned exclusively with the KwaZulu-Natal provincial union. Since then, the Super Rugby (and later United Rugby Championship) and Currie Cup teams have been fully integrated and operate within a unified structure.

In 2021, MVM Holdings purchased a 51% controlling interest in the Sharks, with the remaining 49% retained by the Kwazulu-Natal Rugby Union and SuperSport.

In addition the franchise operates a Junior squads which compete in national youth tournaments. Age-group rugby within the KwaZulu-Natal province is also branded under the Sharks name, creating a unified identity across all levels of the player development pathway.

==== Super Rugby ====
The Sharks first competed in Super Rugby in 1993 when it was called the Super 10. That year they finished second in their pool. In 1994, they topped their group and reached the final, losing to Queensland. They did not compete in 1995. The team joined the inaugural Super 12 in 1996, finishing fourth and progressing to the final, where they lost to Auckland.

Branded as the Coastal Sharks from 1998, the team experienced mixed success, reaching the semi-finals that year and the final in 2001 where they were comprehensively beaten by the Brumbies, but also finishing last in 2000. The turn of the millennium also saw rapid coaching turnover with long term coach Ian McIntosh retiring, his replacement Hugh Reece-Edwards being quickly fired after the disastrous 2000 Super 12 season, and Rudolph Straeuli taking over.

Their strongest regular season came in 2007, when – coached by Dick Muir – they topped the Super 14 table and became the first South African side to host a final, narrowly losing to the Bulls after a last-minute try by Bryan Habana.

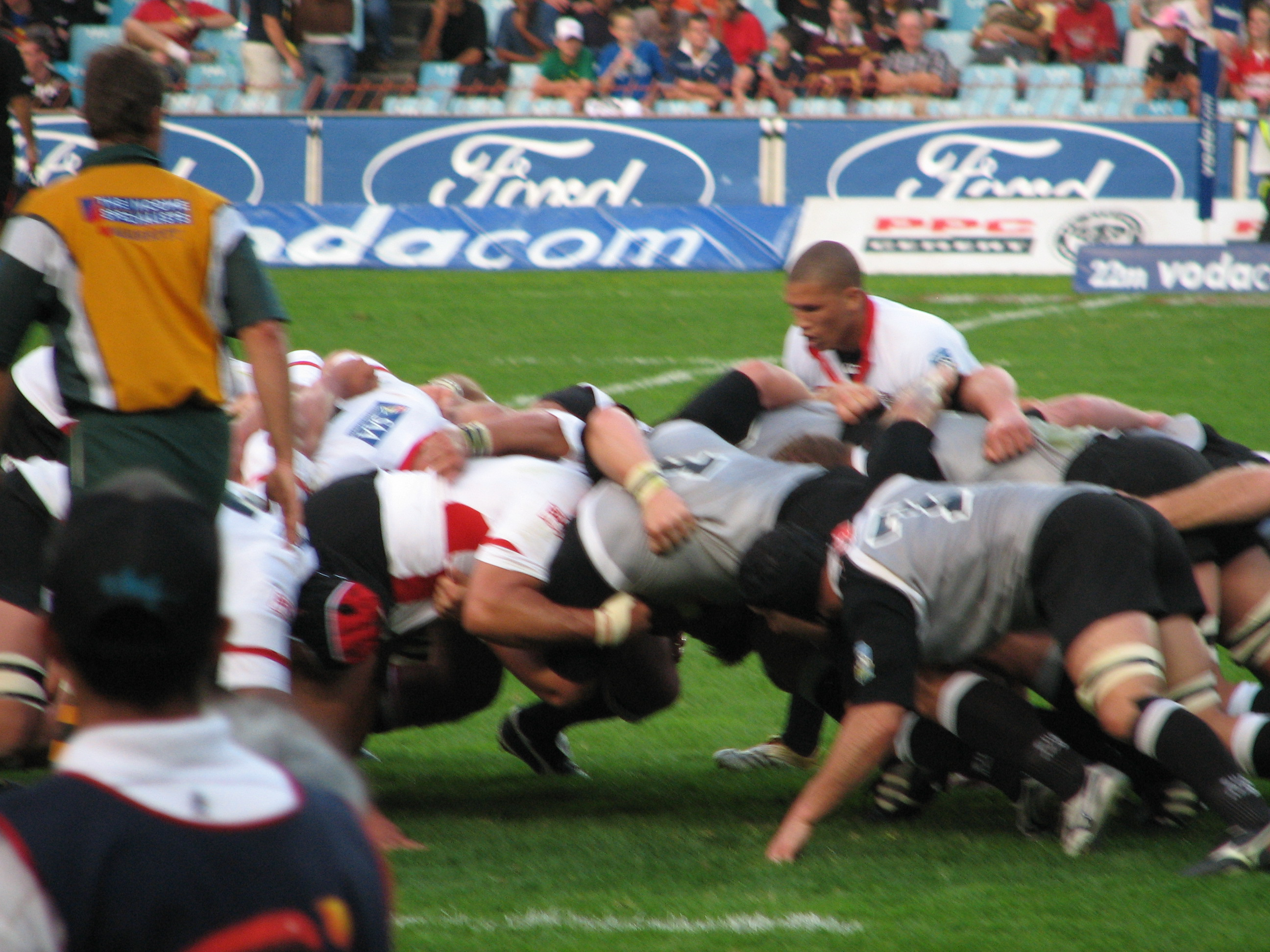
Sharks playing Cats (now Lions) in 2006

In 2012, the Sharks made a dramatic playoff run, traveling over 55,000 km to win knockout matches in Australia and South Africa before falling to the Chiefs in the final. They won the South African Conference in 2014, but coaching instability followed, with John Plumtree and Jake White leaving in quick succession. After a poor 2015 season, the team began to stabilize and reached four consecutive quarter-finals in 2016, 2017, 2018 and 2019.

The Sharks led the 2020 Super Rugby season before it was cancelled due to the COVID-19 pandemic. As international travel restrictions took effect, the Sharks competed in domestic and regional tournaments such as Super Rugby Unlocked, finishing third. In 2021, it was announced that South African franchises would leave Super Rugby to join the newly structured United Rugby Championship (URC).

==== United Rugby Championship and EPCR ====
The Sharks entered the United Rugby Championship in the 2021–2022 season and played their first official URC game against Munster in Ireland on 25 September 2021. Previously, due to COVID-19 pandemic effecting international travel the Sharks participated in the Pro14 Rainbow Cup, marking their first appearance in European rugby competitions. The South African sides competed in the 'Rainbow Cup SA', finishing second. Their 2021–22 was a strong campaign, finishing 5th in the regular season standings. They were narrowly eliminated in the quarter-finals by the Bulls, who secured victory with a drop goal in added time. Despite the loss, the season was considered a moderate success, especially as the Sharks secured qualification for the Champions Cup for the first time.

The 2022–2023 season was more mixed. Domestically, the Sharks finished 8th and were comfortably beaten by Leinster in the URC quarter-finals. Poor early season form lead to the dismissal of head coach Sean Everitt, with Director of Rugby Neil Powell stepping in for the remainder of the season. Although an 8th-place finish would ordinarily ensure Champions Cup qualification, URC regulations give automatic qualification to each of the four regional shield winners. Cardiff, winners of the Welsh Shield despite finishing below the Sharks on the overall table, claimed the final Champions Cup spot. As a result, the Sharks were relegated to the EPCR Challenge Cup for the following season. In their inaugural Champions Cup campaign, however, the Sharks performed well—finishing third in Pool A after winning three out of four pool matches. They defeated Munster comfortably in the Round of 16 before a heavy quarter-final defeat to Toulouse.

The 2023–2024 season marked a downturn in domestic form. The season began with John Plumtree being appointed as Head Coach. The Sharks finished 14th in the URC with just four wins. With URC hopes fading, the team shifted its focus to the EPCR Challenge Cup, where they ultimately found success—defeating Gloucester in the final to secure their first European title. The win granted them automatic qualification for the 2024–2025 Champions Cup.

In 2024–2025 season, the Sharks rebounded in the URC, finishing 3rd and hosting a quarter-final in Durban. They defeated Munster in a dramatic match that went to extra time and penalties after a 24–24 draw, setting up a semi-final with the Bulls at Loftus, which they lost 25–13. However, their European campaign was less successful: they won only one of four Champions Cup pool games and were demoted to the Challenge Cup Round of 16, where they were comprehensively beaten by eventual finalists Lyon.

== The Sharks Region ==
Map of South Africa displaying the borders of the 14 teams in the Currie Cup

The Sharks catchment covers the province of KwaZulu-Natal. The two main cities from which most of its players are drawn are Durban and Pietermaritzburg.

Historically and recently many Eastern Cape talent prefer to play for The Sharks. Having previously been the Coastal Sharks, while more recently establishing a strategic relationship with the Border Bulldogs. As well as a strategic partnership with the Pumas.

== KwaZulu-Natal Rugby Union ==
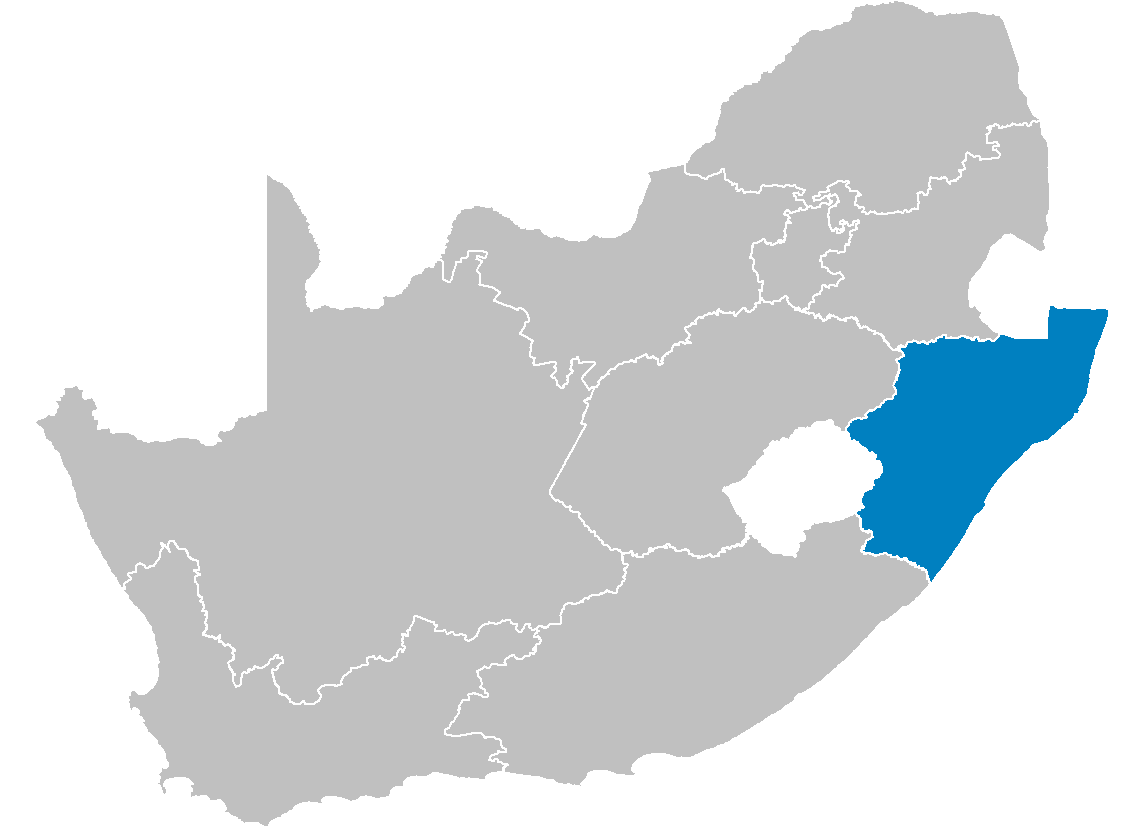
KwaZulu-Natal Province

The KwaZulu-Natal Rugby Union was founded as the Natal Rugby Union in 1890 and is one of the oldest unions in the country. The KwaZulu-Natal Rugby Union is the major shareholder in the Sharks, and is responsible for the administration of club rugby in the province of KwaZulu-Natal. Well, known clubs in the region include Rovers, Durban Collegians, the University of KwaZulu-Natal (formerly University of Natal), Varsity College, Amanzimtoti, Durban Crusaders and Westville Old Boys RFC.

The senior clubs in the province compete for the Moor Cup, a trophy presented in 1876 to George Moor, captain of the "Colonials" in their victory against the "Home-borns" in Kimberly. The trophy found its way to Pietermaritzburg and in 1957 the first KwaZulu-Natal club to win the cup was University of Natal (Durban campus). Since 2013 the Moor Cup has also acted as the qualification process for all non-university Kwa-Zulu Natal clubs to gain entry to the SARU Community Cup, the premier club rugby competition in South Africa for non-university teams.

The KZNRU also hosts the Murray Cup. An annual 16 team knock out tournament featuring 8 Premier Division teams and 8 First Division teams. The Murray Cup was founded in 1890, and is named after Sir TK Murray. Murray was appointed in June 1890 as the first President of the Natal Rugby Union, which today is known as the KwaZulu-Natal Rugby Union. He presented the union with its first trophy, The Murray Cup.

Other KZNRU tournaments and trophies include: the Wylie Cup, the Optimum Cup, the Findlay Cup, the Walker Cup Third Division, Foaden Bowl Fourth Division, the CF Glew Fifth Division, the Keith Parkinson Trophy, the Frank Norris U20 'A' Trophy, the Kings Park Challenge U20 'B' Trophy and the DW Gewde U20 'B' Knock Out competition.

KwaZulu-Natal is also represented by the Durban University of Technology, the University of KwaZulu-Natal and Varsity College in the annual Varsity Cup/Varsity Shield competitions.

== Team identity ==
Logo of Natal Rugby Union prior to 1995

The team was originally known as Natal, representing the province of the same name, and was informally nicknamed the Banana Boys or Piesangboere—a nod to the region's subtropical agriculture and perceived underdog status.

In 1995, the team underwent a major rebranding and adopted the name The Sharks, accompanied by a new logo, mascot (Sharkie), and a coordinated marketing campaign. Although initially met with resistance from traditionalists, the new identity quickly gained traction due to strong team performances and a high-profile branding rollout. The shift resulted in noticeable growth in attendance, merchandise sales, and corporate engagement.

As the team began competing in Super Rugby in 1998, it used the name Coastal Sharks to reflect a temporary partnership with Eastern Cape unions. However, "The Sharks" remained the central brand in public and commercial use. Following the end of this regional partnership in 2005, the team's brand identity consolidated entirely under the KwaZulu-Natal banner.

In 2022, the franchise refreshed its visual identity by updating the logo and introducing a new slogan. The revised logo now incorporates the word Durban, aligning the brand more directly with the team's home city.

In 2024, the franchise introduced the designation "Sharks XV" for its Currie Cup team. While the side continues to operate under the broader Sharks umbrella, this naming convention was viewed as an effort to standardize branding across all levels of competition and mirror similar changes made by other South African franchises.

=== Rivalries ===
The Sharks' most long-standing rivalry is with the Bulls (formerly 'Northern Transvaal'). The Sharks first-ever Currie Cup final victory came against Northern Transvaal in Pretoria in 1990 and since then the two teams have played out a number of classic encounters including the 2007 Super Rugby Final in Durban where the Bulls were victorious by the narrowest of margins in front of a packed Kings Park Stadium. The Sharks also have a rivalry against Transvaal/Golden Lions. The teams contested a number of finals throughout the 1990s and whilst the rivalry diminished somewhat during the 2000s it was reignited following the Lions defeat of the Sharks in the 2011 Currie Cup Final in Johannesburg. Being the two most successful coastal teams in the country, a strong rivalry also exists between the Sharks and Western Province/Stormers, and a match between the two teams is called the 'coastal derby'.

== Stadium ==
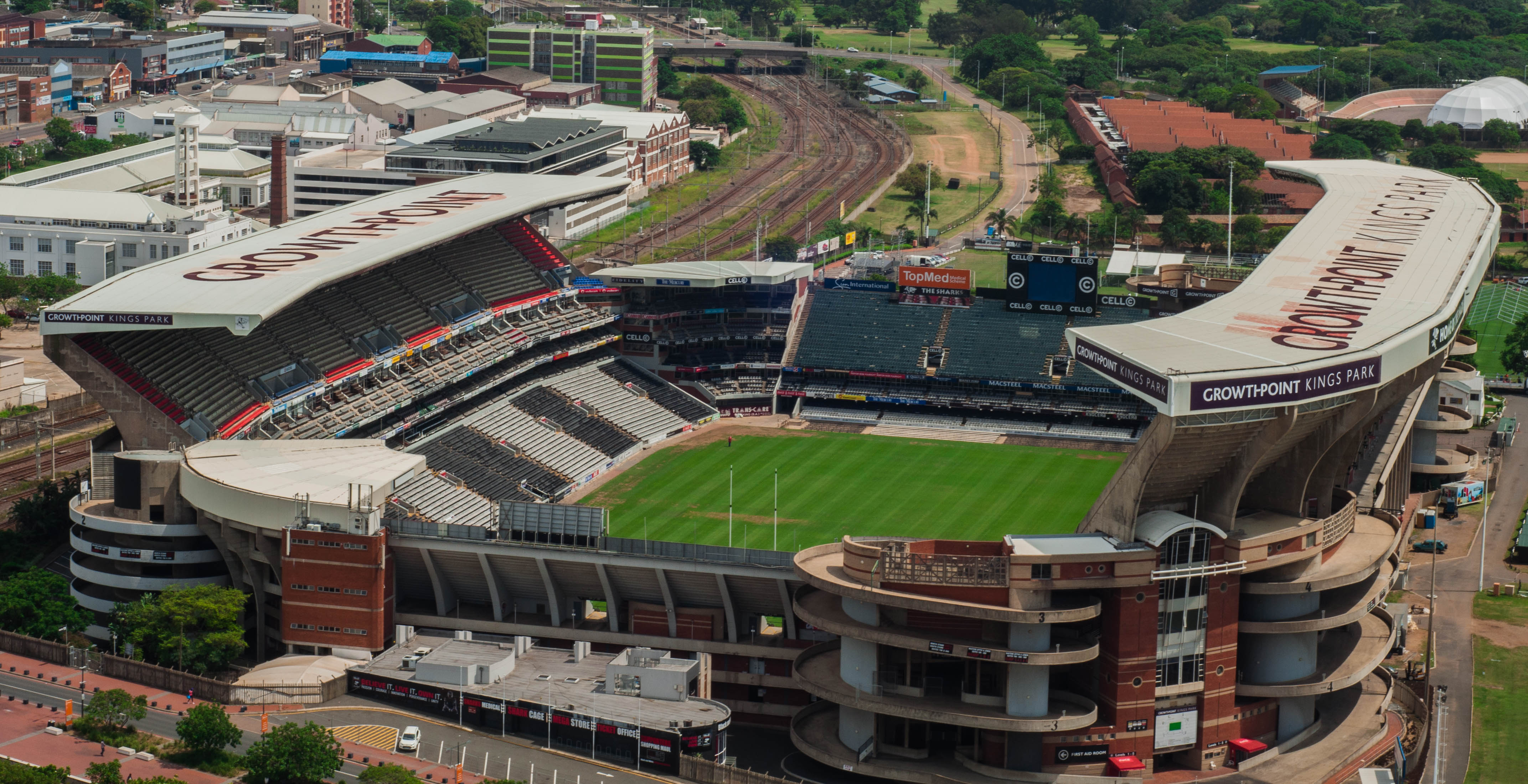
Kings Park Stadium, the home of the Sharks

Hollywoodbets Kings Park Stadium in Durban is the home ground of The Sharks. It is locally known as "The Shark Tank". It currently has a capacity of 46,000, having been reduced from 52,000.. In addition to being the home of the Sharks, it is also used during the Currie Cup for the Sharks. The ground was originally built in 1968, but have been worked on numerous times. A major upgrade occurred for the 1995 Rugby World Cup.

The KwaZulu-Natal Rugby Union also owns Woodburn Stadium a 12,000 capacity multipurpose stadium in Petermaritzburg.

== Current squad ==
The Sharks squad for the 2026–27 United Rugby Championship is: (Note: Luan Giliomee & Bongi Mbonambi were both named in the original Sharks squad, but joined the Bulls and the Stormers respectively in October 2026.)

2026–27 Sharks squad
**Props**: (South Africa) Cameron Dawson; (South Africa) **Thomas du Toit**; (South Africa) Phatu Ganyane; (South Africa) Dian Heunis; (South Africa) Hanro Jacobs; (South Africa) **Vincent Koch**; (South Africa) Rambo Kubheka; (South Africa) Simphiwe Matanzima; (South Africa) Lee-Marvin Mazibuko; (South Africa) **Ox Nché**; (South Africa) Simphiwe Ngobese; (South Africa) **Trevor Nyakane**; (South Africa) Nemo Roelofse; **Hookers**: (South Africa) Ethan Bester; (South Africa) Fez Mbatha; (South Africa) Esethu Mnebelele; (South Africa) Eduan Swart; (South Africa) Liam van Wyk; **Locks**: (South Africa) **Eben Etzebeth**; (South Africa) **Jason Jenkins**; (Zimbabwe) Darrien Landsberg *; (South Africa) Coetzee le Roux; (South Africa) **Stephan Lewies**; (South Africa) Johan Momsen; (South Africa) Jannes Potgieter; (South Africa) Corne Rahl; (South Africa) Deon Slabbert; (South Africa) Emile van Heerden	**Back row**: (South Africa) **Phepsi Buthelezi**; (South Africa) Thomas Dyer; (South Africa) Nick Hatton; (Zimbabwe) **Tinotenda Mavesere**; (South Africa) Matt Romao; (South Africa) Hendré Stassen; (Democratic Republic of the Congo) Manu Tshituka *; (South Africa) **Vincent Tshituka**; **Scrum-halves**: (Canada) **Ross Braude** *; (South Africa) Bradley Davids; (South Africa) Ceano Everson; (South Africa) **Jaden Hendrikse**; (South Africa) Juan Loots; (South Africa) **Ivan van Zyl**; **Fly-halves**: (South Africa) **Jordan Hendrikse**; (South Africa) Gianni Lombard; (South Africa) Siya Masuku; (South Africa) **Vusi Moyo**	**Centres**: (South Africa) Albie Bester; (South Africa) **André Esterhuizen** **(c)**; (South Africa) Matthew Fortuin; (South Africa) **Ethan Hooker**; (Namibia) Jurenzo Julius *; (South Africa) Murray Koster; (South Africa) Lyle Matthews; (New Zealand) **Ma'a Nonu**; (South Africa) Janco Purchase; **Wings**: (South Africa) Lili Bester; (South Africa) Donavan Don; (South Africa) Suleiman Hartzenberg; (South Africa) **Makazole Mapimpi**; (South Africa) Yaw Penxe; (South Africa) Khuthi Rasivhaga; (South Africa) PK Sobahle; (South Africa) **Edwill van der Merwe**; (South Africa) **Jaco Williams**; **Fullbacks**: (South Africa) Zekhethelo Siyaya
**(c)** denotes the team captain. **Bold** denotes internationally capped players. * denotes players qualified to play for South Africa on residency or dual nationality. Source:

The following players have been included so far in the Sharks XV squad for the 2026 Currie Cup Premier Division:

2026 Sharks XV Currie Cup squad
**Props**: (South Africa) Cameron Dawson; (South Africa) Jaco du Toit (Note: Addition for 2026 Currie Cup); (South Africa) Christoff Etzebeth; (South Africa) Dian Heunis; (South Africa) Rambo Kubheka; (South Africa) Lee-Marvin Mazibuko; (South Africa) Simphiwe Ngobese; **Hookers**: (South Africa) Bryce Calvert; (South Africa) Jacques Marais; (South Africa) Kerron van Vuuren; (South Africa) Liam van Wyk (Note: Addition for 2026 Currie Cup); **Locks**: (South Africa) Meno Barnard; (South Africa) Coetzee le Roux; (South Africa) Sphephelo Mbonambi; (South Africa) Johan Momsen; (South Africa) Kuhle Mthimkhulu; (South Africa) Jannes Potgieter; (South Africa) Deon Slabbert	**Back row**: (South Africa) Danio Botha (Note: Addition for 2026 Currie Cup); (South Africa) Thomas Dyer **(c)**; (South Africa) Henrico Germishuizen; (Zimbabwe) **Tinotenda Mavesere**; (South Africa) Sipho Nonyalela; (South Africa) Luann Olivier; (South Africa) Hanu Pieterse; (South Africa) Jean-Henri Smit; (South Africa) Willem van den Hever; (South Africa) Wasi Vyambwera; **Scrum-halves**: (Canada) **Ross Braude**; (South Africa) Ceano Everson; (South Africa) Juan Loots; **Fly-halves**: (South Africa) Chris Horak; (South Africa) Siya Masuku; (South Africa) Tim Swiel	**Centres**: (United States) **Dominic Besag**; (South Africa) Albie Bester; (South Africa) Matthew Fortuin (Note: Addition for 2026 Currie Cup); (South Africa) Lyle Matthews; (South Africa) Janco Purchase; (South Africa) William Ridl; **Wings**: (South Africa) Christie Grobbelaar; (South Africa) Scott Nel; (South Africa) Marnus Potgieter; (South Africa) Khuthi Rasivhaga; (South Africa) PK Sobahle; (South Africa) Maurice Willemse; **Fullbacks**: (South Africa) Luan Giliomee (Note: Addition for 2026 Currie Cup); (South Africa) Gregan Jansen; (South Africa) Chijindu Okonta
**(c)** denotes the team captain. **Bold** denotes internationally capped players. * denotes players qualified to play for South Africa on residency or dual nationality. Source:

== Notable players ==
The side includes many Springbok players, including Aphelele Fassi, Ox Nche, Makazole Mapimpi, Lukhanyo Am, Grant Williams, Bongi Mbonambi, most capped Springbok Eben Etzebeth and double Rugby World Cup winning captain Siya Kolisi. Historically, many Springboks have played for the Sharks.

They have also featured many international stars including former Scottish International and current head coach of Scotland Gregor Townsend and current international Dylan Richardson; Zimbabwean international Tinotenda Mavesere; former French international Frédéric Michalak; former Australian International Ben Tapuai; and former Argentinian internationals Joaquín Díaz Bonilla and Juan Martín Hernández, amongst others.

In 2026, the team was joined by former All Black Ma'a Nonu. He debuted in an international match against his former national team, the All Blacks, at the age of 44. The Sharks lost 54-0.

=== Springboks ===
The following players have represented South Africa while playing for the Sharks:

- Cameron Christian
- Alf Walker
- Bill Payn
- Bertram van der Plank
- Bill Zeller
- Taffy Townsend
- Wally Clarkson
- Phil Nel
- Jacko Tod
- Ebbo Bastard
- Pat Lyster
- Cecil Moss
- Roy Dryburgh
- Keith Oxlee
- Ormond Taylor
- Don Walton
- Trix Truter
- Snowy Suter
- Tommy Bedford
- Rodney Gould
- Hannes Viljoen
- Piston van Wyk
- Ian McCallum
- Derek van den Berg
- Wynand Claassen
- Rudi Visagie
- Lood Muller
- Hugh Reece-Edwards
- Wahl Bartmann
- Robert du Preez (scrumhalf)
- John Allan
- André Joubert
- Steve Atherton
- Henry Honiball
- Guy Kebble
- Gary Teichmann
- Joel Stransky
- Adrian Garvey
- Jeremy Thomson
- James Small
- Pieter Muller
- Johan Ackerman
- Deon Kayser
- Warren Brosnihan
- Mark Andrews
- Wayne Fyvie
- Etienne Fynn
- Ollie le Roux
- Warren Britz
- AJ Venter
- Albert van den Berg
- André Snyman
- Robbi Kempson
- Percy Montgomery
- Ricardo Loubscher
- Stefan Terblanche
- Lukas van Biljon
- Trevor Halstead
- Craig Davidson
- John Smit
- Shaun Sowerby
- Deon Carstens
- Solly Tyibilika
- Butch James
- Henno Mentz
- Brent Russell
- BJ Botha
- Johann Muller
- Ruan Pienaar
- JP Pietersen
- Francois Steyn
- Ryan Kankowski
- Tendai Mtawarira
- Odwa Ndungane
- Bismarck du Plessis
- Jannie du Plessis
- Adrian Jacobs
- Waylon Murray
- Keegan Daniel
- Patrick Lambie
- Willem Alberts
- Lourens Adriaanse
- Lwazi Mvovo
- Marcell Coetzee
- Pieter-Steph du Toit
- Stephan Lewies
- Cobus Reinach
- Jean-Luc du Preez
- Curwin Bosch
- Dan du Preez
- Louis Schreuder
- Lukhanyo Am
- Makazole Mapimpi
- André Esterhuizen
- Thomas du Toit
- Akker van der Merwe
- Robert du Preez (fly-half)
- S'busiso Nkosi
- Jaden Hendrikse
- Ox Nché
- Aphelele Fassi
- Jean Deysel
- Grant Williams
- Roy McLean former fly-half, also played for SA cricket team, the Proteas.

== The Sharks Academy ==
The Sharks Academy claims to be the oldest rugby youth academy in South Africa. The academy runs a 'gap year' style programme for overseas players, specifically aimed at school leavers. The academy, which is accredited by SA Rugby and backed by a strategic partnership with the Sharks, offers a full-time, three-year course designed for young people with a passion for rugby and a desire to forge a career in the sport. Players such as Keegan Daniel, Ryan Kankowski, Patrick Lambie, Tendai Mtawarira, Lwazi Mvovo, JP Pietersen and François Steyn are all graduates of the programme.

== Coaches ==
=== History ===
The Sharks were coached by Former Springbok coach Ian McIntosh between 1996 and 1999, with Hugh Reece-Edwards as his assistant. In 2000, Reece-Edwards took over as coach with Jake White and Allister Coetzee as assistants.

All three were replaced the following year however, as Rudolf Straeuli was appointed coach, with Kobus van der Merwe as his assistant. In 2002, Clinton Isaacs replaced Van der Merwe as Straeuli's assistant.

Kevin Putt was appointed as Straeuli's replacement when he was appointed Springbok coach, with Theo Jansen van Rensburg as assistant. Dick Muir replaced Putt in 2006 and pulled in John Plumtree as his assistant. Plumtree took over the head coaching position for the 2007 Currie Cup, whilst Muir took time off to add to his qualifications and learn from some of the most successful coaches in rugby history, such as Sir Clive Woodward. Muir took The Sharks to the 2007 Super 14 final at home and was later seconded as an assistant coach to Peter de Villiers with the national side.

John Plumtree took over as full-time coach in 2008 where he found immediate success, taking the Sharks to their first Currie Cup title since 1996 when they defeated the Blue Bulls in Durban. He repeated that feat in 2010 when his team beat Western Province in the Kings Park final. Following their Super Rugby Final's appearance in 2012, the Sharks produced a lacklustre season in 2013, finishing 8th on the combined log and 4th of 5 teams in the South African division. Plumtree's final season as Sharks coach was marred by a roster depleted of injuries and perceived tactical challenges.

Soon after the Sharks' appointment of former Springbok and Sharks captain John Smit as team CEO in mid 2013, news reports emerged that White had contacted former Springbok Brendan Venter to assume a short-term coaching role for the Sharks. Following days of media reports speculating on Plumtree's job security, the Sharks announced that Plumtree would not be brought back following the end of the Super Rugby Campaign. Venter was soon appointed as the Director of Rugby for the 2013 Currie Cup campaign, with coaches Brad McLeod-Henderson (forwards) and Sean Everitt (backs) assuming the day-to-day coaching responsibilities. Following the end of the Sharks' successful 2013 Currie Cup campaign, Venter stepped down as Director of Rugby. Former Springboks' coach Jake White, looking to return to coaching in South Africa, was soon hired to succeed Venter as the Sharks' Director of Rugby and Super Rugby coach, with McLeod-Henderson and Everitt remaining as his full-time assistant coaches.

At the end of 2014 White resigned as Super Rugby coach and Director of Rugby, and former Kobelco Steelers coach Gary Gold was hired as Head Coach and Super Rugby coach for the 2015 Super Rugby Season. McLeod-Henderson resigned after a poor Super Rugby Campaign and Gary Gold assumed the reigns as Currie Cup coach for 2015, Director of Rugby and the Super Rugby coach for 2016.

Towards the end of 2016 Gary Gold left the Sharks and assistant coach Robert du Preez became coach for the 2016 Currie Cup campaign, as well as the Super Rugby coach from 2017. Du Preez would lead the Sharks to the quarter-finals of Super Rugby for three consecutive years, but did not manage to progress beyond that stage.

For the 2020 season, du Preez stepped down and Sean Everitt was appointed head coach, with David Williams (backline and attack) and Brent Janse van Rensburg (forwards) as his assistants.

On 28 November 2022 the Sharks played in a 0–35 home defeat to the Welsh side Cardiff. This marked the first time in franchise history the Sharks had failed to score a single point in a home game. Something the provincial Currie Cup side had also never done in the professional era. The last game in which the provincial side had failed to score a point at home was in 1972 against England. The following day it was announced that then head coach Sean Everitt would be stepping down with immediate effect, and director of rugby Neil Powell would take over all of the responsibilities.

At the end of the 2022–23 season, it was announced that John Plumtree would be returning to the Sharks for the forthcoming season, once again as head coach, with Powell returning to the role of Director of Rugby.

=== Head coaches ===
Name	Tenure	Win%
(Rhodesia) Ian McIntosh	1986–1999	50.0%
(South Africa) Hugh Reece-Edwards	2000	13.6%
(South Africa) Rudolf Straeuli	2001–2002	52.6%
(New Zealand) Kevin Putt	2002–2005	40.7%
(South Africa) Dick Muir	2006–2007	48.7%
(New Zealand) John Plumtree	2008–2013	58.70%
(South Africa) Jake White	2014	68.7%
(South Africa) Gary Gold	2015–2016	50.0%
(South Africa) Robert du Preez	2017–2019	46%
(South Africa) Sean Everitt	2020–2022	58.7%
(Namibia) Neil Powell	2022–2023	58.8%
(New Zealand) John Plumtree	2023–2025	43.9%
(South Africa) JP Pietersen	2025–	56.3%

=== First team coaching staff ===
Name	Title
(South Africa) JP Pietersen	Head coach
(South Africa) Joey Mongalo	Defence coach
(South Africa) Scott Mathie	Attack coach
(South Africa) Warren Whiteley	Forwards coach
(South Africa) Philip Lemmer	Forwards coach
(Namibia) Neil Powell	Head of junior rugby

== Captains ==
- (South Africa) Gary Teichmann (1996–99)
- (South Africa) Wayne Fyvie (2000)
- (South Africa) Mark Andrews (2001–02)
- (South Africa) Shaun Sowerby (2003)
- (South Africa) John Smit (2004–11)
- (South Africa) Johann Muller (2008–10)
- (South Africa) Stefan Terblanche (2010–11)
- (South Africa) Keegan Daniel (2011–13)
- (South Africa) Bismarck du Plessis (2014–15)
- (South Africa) Marco Wentzel (2015)
- (South Africa) Patrick Lambie (2016)
- (South Africa) Tendai Mtawarira (2016)
- (South Africa) Tera Mtembu (2017)
- (South Africa) Philip van der Walt (2017)
- (South Africa) Ruan Botha (2018)
- (South Africa) Louis Schreuder (2019)
- (South Africa) Tera Mtembu (2019)
- (South Africa) Jeremy Ward (2019)
- (South Africa) Lukhanyo Am (2020–2025)
- (South Africa) Phepsi Buthelezi (2021–)
- (South Africa) Siya Kolisi (2022–23)
- (South Africa) Thomas du Toit (2022)
- (South Africa) James Venter (2022)
- (South Africa) Reniel Hugo (2023–24)
- (South Africa) Francois Venter (2023–24)
- (South Africa) Bongi Mbonambi (2024)
- (South Africa) Eben Etzebeth (2024–)
- (South Africa) Vincent Tshituka (2024-)
- (South Africa) André Esterhuizen (2025-)

== Individual records ==
- Most matches in a career: 159 (Tendai Mtawarira)
- Most points in a match: 50 (Gavin Lawless, v Highlanders, 1997)
- Most points in a season: 193 (Patrick Lambie, 2011)
- Most points in a career: 872 (Curwin Bosch)
- Most tries in a match: 4 (Gavin Lawless, v Highlanders, 1997)(Stefan Terblanche, v Chiefs, 1998)
- Most tries in a season: 13 (James Small, 1996)
- Most tries in a career: 40 (Makazole Mapimpi)
- Most conversions in a match: 9 (Gavin Lawless, v Highlanders, 1997)
- Most conversions in a season: 41 (Curwin Bosch, 2022/2023)
- Most conversions in a career: 179 (Curwin Bosch)
- Most penalty goals in a match: 7 (Gavin Lawless, v NSW Waratahs, 1997)(Patrick Lambie, v Crusaders, 2013)(Robert du Preez, v Blues, 2018)
- Most penalty goals in a season: 43 (Patrick Lambie, 2013)(François Steyn, 2014)
- Most penalty goals in a career: 166 (Patrick Lambie)
- Most drop goals in a match: 3 (Boeta Chamberlain vs Ospreys, 2021)
- Most drop goals in a season: 4 (François Steyn, 2007)(Boeta Chamberlain, 2021/2022)
- Most drop goals in a career: 8 (François Steyn)

== Honours ==
Major Honours in International and Domestic Competitions
Competition	Titles won	Runner-up	Semi-finalists	Quarter-finalists	Qualifying-finalists	Round of 16	Conference/Shield Titles
Currie Cup	(9)1990, 1992, 1995, 1996, 2008, 2010, 2013, 2018, 2024	(12) 1956, 1984, 1993, 1999, 2000, 2001, 2003, 2011, 2012, 2017, 2020–21, 2021	–	–	–	–	
Super 10	(0)	(1) 1994	–	–	–	–	–
Super Rugby	(0)	(4) 1996, 2001, 2007, 2012	(4) 1997, 1998, 2008, 2014	(4) 2016, 2017, 2018, 2019	(1) 2011	–	(1) 2014
United Rugby Championship	(0)	–	(1) 2024/25	(2) 2021/22, 2022/23	–	–	(1) 2024/25
EPCR Challenge Cup	(1) 2023/24	–	–	(1) 2024/25	–	–	–
European Rugby Champions Cup	(0)	–	–	(1) 2022/23	–	(1) 2022/23	–

Minor Honours
Competition	Best Result	Years
Vodacom Shield	Runners-up	2002
Vodacom Cup	Runners-up	2006
World Club 10s	Third Place	2016, 2018
Toyota Challenge	Runners-up	2021

=== Currie Cup finals ===
Finals won:

Season	Winners	Score	Runner-up	Venue
1990	Natal	18–12	Northern Transvaal	Loftus Versfeld, Pretoria
1992	Natal	14–13	Transvaal	Ellis Park Stadium, Johannesburg
1995	Sharks	25–17	Western Province	Kings Park Stadium, Durban
1996	Sharks	33–15	Golden Lions	Ellis Park Stadium, Johannesburg
2008	Sharks	14–9	Blue Bulls	ABSA Stadium, Durban
2010	Sharks	30–10	Western Province	ABSA Stadium, Durban
2013	Sharks	33–19	Western Province	Newlands Stadium, Cape Town
2018	Sharks	17–12	Western Province	Newlands Stadium, Cape Town
2024	Sharks	16–14	Golden Lions	Ellis Park Stadium, Johannesburg

Finals lost:

Season	Winners	Score	Runner-up	Venue
1956	Northern Transvaal	9–8	Natal	Kings Park Stadium, Durban
1984	Western Province	19–9	Natal	Newlands Stadium, Cape Town
1993	Transvaal	21–15	Natal	Kings Park Stadium, Durban
1999	Golden Lions	32–9	Sharks	Kings Park Stadium, Durban
2000	Western Province	25–15	Sharks	Absa Stadium, Durban
2001	Western Province	29–24	Sharks	Newlands Stadium, Cape Town
2003	Blue Bulls	40–19	Sharks	Loftus Versfeld, Pretoria
2011	Golden Lions	42–16	Sharks	Ellis Park Stadium, Johannesburg
2012	Western Province	25–18	Sharks	Kings Park Stadium, Durban
2017	Western Province	33–21	Sharks	Kings Park Stadium, Durban
2020–21	Blue Bulls	26–19	Sharks	Loftus Versfeld, Pretoria
2021	Blue Bulls	44–10	Sharks	Loftus Versfeld, Pretoria

== Bibliography ==
- Howitt, Bob (2005). SANZAR Saga – Ten Years of Super 12 and Tri-Nations Rugby. Harper Collins Publishers. ISBN 1-86950-566-2.
- McIlraith, Matt (2005). Ten Years of Super 12. Hodder Moa. ISBN 1-86971-025-8.

Stat source: All.rugby : Transfers, News, Results and Stats
