= Keith Oxlee =

South African rugby union player

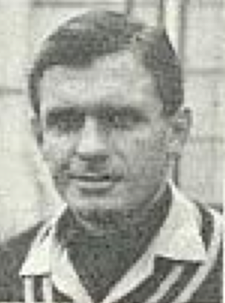
- Born: Keith Oxlee; 17 December 1934 Johannesburg, South Africa
- Died: 31 August 1998 (aged 63) Umhlanga, Kwazulu-Natal
- Height: 1.77 m (5 ft 10 in)
- Weight: 72.6 kg (160 lb)
- School: Maritzburg College, Pietermaritzburg
- Occupation: Chemical salesman

Rugby union career
- Position: Fly-half
Amateur team(s)
Years	Team	Apps	(Points)
- Durban Collegians RFC
Provincial / State sides
Years	Team	Apps	(Points)
1955-1971	Natal	102	(412)
- Correct as of 22 December 2013
International career
Years	Team	Apps	(Points)
1960–1965	South Africa	19	(88)
- Correct as of 22 December 2013

Keith Oxlee (17 December 1934 – 31 August 1998) was a South African rugby union player who represented South Africa in 19 tests between 1960 and 1965. He amassed 88 career test points, breaking Gerry Brand's 27-year-old South African record and setting one that stood for 20 years until it was surpassed by Naas Botha.

Oxlee set a record for most points scored by a South African player in a test against the British and Irish Lions of 16 (5 conversion and 2 penalty kicks in the 4th test on 25 August 1962) which lasted until 1981. Oxlee was also the first player ever to win 100 caps for Natal.

== Early life ==
Keith Oxlee was born in Johannesburg on 17 December 1934 and educated at Maritzburg College in Pietermaritzburg, Kwazulu-Natal, matriculating in 1952.

== Rugby career ==
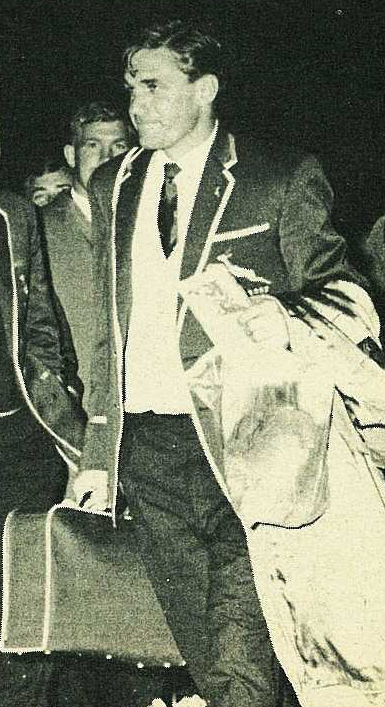
Keith Oxlee arriving at Gisborne, New Zealand, on South Africa's 1965 tour to Australasia.

After his selection for Natal in 1955, Oxlee eventually set a provincial record of 102 matches at fly-half, broken only in 1998 by Henry Honiball. He represented Natal in the wind-battered 1956 Currie Cup final against Northern Transvaal at Kingsmead in Durban, which the northern side won by 9 to 8.

In 1958 Oxlee was selected to play in trials for tests against France. Despite making the final round of the trials, he was not selected.

Oxlee helped Natal to hold Wilson Whineray's touring New Zealand to a 6–6 draw at Kings Park in Durban on 31 May 1960. And in 1963 he was on the Natal team that beat John Thornett's touring Australian national side 14–13 at Kings Park Stadium. To counter Natal's lightweight packs in an era of heavy forwards, Natal coach Izak van Heerden emphasized unorthodox play to retain possession, such as attacking from within normally defensive positions. Oxlee fitted this game plan perfectly with his "sleight of hand passing, constant switches of direction and astute tactical kicking".

Oxlee made his Springbok debut on 25 June 1960 against the All Blacks at Ellis Park Stadium, a match the Springboks won by 13–0. One of 6 new caps chosen, Oxlee would go on to represent his country in 48 matches, scoring a total of 201 points. Oxlee's 5 career test tries set a record for a South African fly-half by his retirement.

Oxlee played in outgoing tours against the British and Ireland as well as France (1960–61), Scotland (1965), and Australia and New Zealand (1965). His last test match was on 21 August 1965 against New Zealand at Dunedin. As at Oxlee's debut, the score again read 13-0, but this time it was South Africa that had failed to score.

In the first test of Oxlee's first tour through Britain, he kicked South Africa's only points (a penalty goal) in their 3–0 defeat of Wales at a rain-sodden Cardiff Arms Park on 3 December 1960. Up to that point Oxlee had not been the team's regular goal-kicker, as scrum-half Dick Lockyear was preferred; but Lockyear was unavailable due to injury. Oxlee missed his first two kicks at goal, but succeeded just before half-time. The match was played in winds of up to 50 mph, with conditions so poor that referee JAS Taylor at one point asked the South African and Welsh captains, Avril Malan and Terry Davies, respectively, whether they would prefer to abandon the game.

Oxlee is perhaps best-remembered for the try that he scored in the first test against the Wallabies at Ellis Park on 5 August 1961. He had been the target of heavy tackling by the Australians, to the extent that he had to receive stitches above his eye. He was so dazed that he was moved to centre after refusing to leave the field. Oxlee retained his playing instincts and scored a try in the dying minutes of the game, enabling his team to win with a record score of 28–3.

In recognition of his sporting prowess Oxlee was named Natal Sportsman of the Year for 1961.

On 10 August 1963 Oxlee kicked the conversion following the first penalty try awarded in a test on South African soil. The Wallabies had impeded Tommy Bedford from chasing a kick over the tryline at Newlands Stadium. Despite Oxlee's contribution to rugby history, the South Africans lost by 5 points to 9.

Oxlee's penchant for unpredictable play was acknowledged by the captain of the 1962 British Lions, Arthur Smith, who said that "the problem with Oxlee is that you never know what the blighter will be doing next."

To celebrate Oxlee's retirement from provincial rugby in 1967, Natal held a farewell game in which they defeated by 32–22 a South African Barbarians team that fielded 10 Springboks. Oxlee was later appointed provincial selector, but was enticed to come out of retirement at the age of 36 to "guide a young backline" for four matches in 1971.

In 2009 Oxlee was nominated for inclusion in the IRB Hall of Fame.

== Test history ==
Opponents	Results (RSA 1st)	Position	Points	Dates	Venue
New Zealand	13–0	Fly-half	–	25 June 1960	Ellis Park, Johannesburg
New Zealand	3–11	Fly-half	3 (try)	23 July 1960	Newlands Stadium, Cape Town
New Zealand	11–11	Fly-half	3 (try)	11 August 1960	Free State Stadium, Bloemfontein
New Zealand	8–3	Fly-half	–	27 August 1960	EPRU Stadium, Port Elizabeth
Wales	3–0	Fly-half	3 (pen. )	3 December 1960	National Stadium, Cardiff
Ireland	8–3	Fly-half	–	17 December 1960	Lansdowne Road, Dublin
Scotland	12–5	Fly-half	–	21 January 1961	Murrayfield Stadium, Edinburgh
Australia	28–3	Fly-half	–	5 August 1961	Ellis Park, Johannesburg
Australia	23–11	Fly-half	14 (try, 3 pen., 1 conv.)	12 August 1961	EPRU Stadium, Port Elizabeth
British & Irish Lions	3–3	Fly-half	–	23 June 1962	Ellis Park, Johannesburg
British & Irish Lions	3–0	Fly-half	3 (pen. )	21 July 1962	Kings Park Stadium, Durban
British & Irish Lions	8–3	Fly-half	8 (try, 1 pen., 1 conv.)	4 August 1962	Newlands Stadium, Cape Town
British & Irish Lions	34–14	Fly-half	16 (2 pen., 5 conv.)	25 August 1962	Free State Stadium, Bloemfontein
Australia	14–3	Fly-half	8 (2 pen., 1 conv.)	3 July 1963	Loftus Versfeld Stadium, Pretoria
Australia	5–9	Fly-half	2 (1 conv.)	10 August 1963	Newlands Stadium, Cape Town
Australia	22–6	Fly-half	10 (2 pen. & 2 conv.)	7 September 1963	EPRU Stadium, Port Elizabeth
Wales	24–3	Fly-half	12 (2 pen., 3 conv.)	23 May 1964	Kings Park Stadium, Durban
New Zealand	6–3	Fly-half	3 (drop)	31 July 1965	Athletic Park, Wellington
New Zealand	0–13	Fly-half	–	21 August 1965	Carisbrook, Dunedin

Legend: pen.= penalty (3 pts.); conv. = conversion (2 pts.), drop = drop kick (3 pts.).

== Personal life ==
Oxlee was married to Barbara, with whom he had a son, Grant, and a daughter, Leanne. He worked as sales representative for Protea Industrial Chemicals in Durban for two decades. He maintained his physical fitness and completed two Comrades Marathons and played in touch rugby tournaments. An adept lawn bowler, Oxlee once defeated the national champion.

Oxlee died in 1998 at the age of 63 from a blood clot after complications following a hip operation. At the next outing of Natal in the Currie Cup competition, both teams maintained a minute of silence to commemorate Oxlee's passing.
