= 1956 Currie Cup =

Domestic rugby union competition

- Countries: South Africa
- Champions: Northern Transvaal (2nd title)
- Runners-up: Natal

The 1956 Currie Cup was the 26th edition of the Currie Cup, the premier domestic rugby union competition in South Africa.

The tournament was won by Northern Transvaal for the second time; they beat Natal 9–8 in the final in Durban.

== Fixtures and Results ==
=== Semi-final ===
1956	Western Province	10 - 11	Natal	Newlands, Cape Town

=== Final ===
1956	Natal	8 - 9	Northern Transvaal	Kings Park Stadium, Durban
				Referee: Bawden Coombie

== See also ==
- Currie Cup
