= Ruhuna Rugby Football Union =

Southern Province rugby union governing body

The Ruhuna Rugby Football Union (RRFU) is the governing body for rugby union in Southern Province, Sri Lanka. Its president, Kumar Abeywardena, resigned on 12 June 2010.

== See also ==
- Sri Lanka Rugby Football Union
