= Snowy Suter =

South African rugby union player

- Full name: Melvyn Roy Suter
- Born: 14 December 1939 Durban, South Africa
- Died: 15 January 2023 (aged 83)
- Height: 1.86 m (6 ft 1 in)
- Weight: 90 kg (198 lb)

Rugby union career
- Position: Flanker
Provincial / State sides
Years	Team	Apps	(Points)
1961–67	Natal	62	
International career
Years	Team	Apps	(Points)
1965	South Africa	2	(0)

Melvyn Roy "Snowy" Suter (14 December 1939 – 15 January 2023) was a South African international rugby union player.

Barnard, the son of an Australian blacksmith, grew up in Durban. He initially went to a special education school in Glenwood, having been born with a hole in his heart, which made him prone to fainting when undertaking a physical activity. He later joined his brothers at Mansfield High School, where his health improved and he picked up rugby.

Active in the 1960s, Suter played his rugby as a flanker. He debuted for Natal at age 21 and went on to form an effective back row partnership with Tommy Bedford. In 1963, Suter was in the Natal side which defeating the touring Wallabies. He won a Springboks call up for their 1965 tour of the British Isles, where he was set to play a peripheral role until Doug Hopwood suffered an injury, allowing Suter to gain caps against Ireland and Scotland.

== See also ==
- List of South Africa national rugby union players
