= Sri Lanka Rugby =

Governing body for rugby union in Sri Lanka

- Sport: Rugby Union
- Jurisdiction: National
- Abbreviation: SLR
- Founded: 10 August 1908; 117 years ago
- Affiliation: World Rugby
- Affiliation date: 1988
- Regional affiliation: Asia Rugby
- Headquarters: Old Sports Ministry Complex, No. 33 Torrington Place, Colombo 7
- President: Lasitha Gunaratne
- Vice president: Nazeem Mohamed
- Director: Rohan Gunaratne
- Secretary: Thusitha Peris

Official website
- www.srilankarugby.lk
- (Sri Lanka)

Sri Lanka Rugby is the governing body for rugby union in Sri Lanka. It is one of the oldest governing bodies in the world, being founded as the Ceylon Rugby Football Union in 1908.

== History ==
The Ceylon Rugby Football Union was founded in 1908. The Ceylon Rugby Football Union (Ceylon RFU) was founded on 10 August 1908 at a meeting between representatives from Uva, Dimbula, Kelani Valley, Dickoya, Kandy and Colombo at the Grand Orient Hotel (now known as Hotel Taprobane) in Colombo. At the meeting H. B. T. Boucjer (from Uva) was elected as chairman with the representatives unanimously resolving to form the Ceylon Rugby Football Rugby Union and to apply to be affiliated with the English Rugby Football Union. The Ceylon RFU also resolved that Kandy be selected as the centre of the Union and that J. G. Cruikshank be elected as honorary secretary. The Ceylon RFU became the first Rugby Union in Asia.

The SLRFU joined the IRB in 1988. In March 2011 the IRB stripped the SLRFU of full member status after it failed to conduct board elections in accordance with the By-Laws, the SLRFU's full membership however was subsequently re-instated follows the successful completion of the Union's Annual General Meeting and Board elections.

In 2016 the SLRFU resolved to rename the organisation to Sri Lanka Rugby, following recent changes to other major rugby sporting bodies across the world.

== Teams ==
Sri Lanka Rugby has several teams under its control.

- Sri Lanka National Rugby Union Team (Tuskers) – the national men's rugby union team of Sri Lanka.
- Sri Lanka Women's National Rugby Union Team – the national women's rugby union team of Sri Lanka.
- Sri Lanka National Rugby Union Sevens Team – the national rugby sevens team of Sri Lanka.
- Sri Lanka Women's National Rugby Union Sevens Team - the national women's rugby sevens team of Sri Lanka.
- Sri Lanka A – the second-level national rugby union team behind the Tuskers.
- Sri Lanka National Rugby Union Under 20s Team – an age graded side that competes at under-20 level for the IRB Junior World Championship.
- Sri Lanka National Rugby Union Schoolboys Team – a representative team of school players that has developed some of today's current national team players.

Former teams

- Sri Lanka National Rugby Union Under 21s Team – a former age graded side that has developed some of today's current Tuskers.
- Sri Lanka National Rugby Union Under 19s Team – a former age graded side that has developed some of today's current Tuskers.

== Membership ==
Member Unions

- Central Province Rugby Football Union
- North Central Province Rugby Football Union
- Sabaragamuwa Province Rugby Football Union
- Ruhuna Rugby Football Union
- Uva Province Rugby Football Union
- Wayamba Province Rugby Football Union
- Western Province Rugby Football Union

== Criticism and governance issues ==
In July 2025, former Sri Lanka national rugby team coach Richard Murcott stated in an interview with the Daily Mirror (Sri Lanka) that "politics and egos" were undermining the development of rugby in the country. He alleged that the sport's administration was plagued by internal power struggles and called for the establishment of a neutral committee to restore focus on the game's progress.

== See also ==
- Rugby union in Sri Lanka
