= Central Province Rugby Football Union =

Sri Lankan rugby union association

The Central Province Rugby Football Union (CPRFU) is the governing body for rugby union in Central Province, Sri Lanka.

The CPRFU was established in 1992 and is conducted in accordance with the SLRFU guidelines and constitution. At its peak in 2002 the CPRFU included top clubs Kandy SC, Dimbula Athletic & Cricket Club, Dickoya Maskeliya CC, Peradeniya University, OTSC and Kandy Youth, all of whom have at one time or another competed in the SLRFU ‘A’ Division competition. The CPRFU also embarked in forming 'B' division clubs, which included Katugastota Rugby Football Club, Polgolla Rugby Football Club, Mawilmada Rugby Football Club, Matale Rugby Football Club, Nuwra Eliya Rugby Football Club and Pilimatalawa Rugby Football Club and by 2008 had 18 clubs playing in the up-country rugby league.

There were 52 schools in the Central Province engaged in rugby apart from the Schools Association schools teams, Trinity, Kingswood, St. Anthony's, Dharmaraja and Vidyartha.

== See also ==
- Sri Lanka Rugby Football Union
