= Sabaragamuwa Province Rugby Football Union =

The Sabaragamuwa Province Rugby Football Union (SPRFU) is the governing body for rugby union in Sabaragamuwa Province, Sri Lanka. It is responsible for overseeing and promoting rugby union in the North Central Province and is affiliated to Sri Lanka Rugby.

== See also ==
- Sri Lanka Rugby Football Union
