= 1995 Currie Cup =

Domestic rugby union competition

- Champions: Natal
- Runners-up: Western Province
- Matches played: 31

The 1995 Currie Cup (known as the Bankfin Currie Cup for sponsorship reasons) was the 57th season in the South African Currie Cup competition since it started in 1889.

== Competition ==
=== Regular season and title playoffs ===
There were 6 participating teams in the 1995 Currie Cup. These teams played each other twice over the course of the season, once at home and once away.

Teams received two points for a win and one point for a draw.

The top two teams qualified for the final.

== Teams ==
Location of teams in the 1995 Currie Cup

=== Changes from 1994 ===
- None.

=== Team Listing ===
Team	Stadium
Eastern Province	Boet Erasmus Stadium, Port Elizabeth
Natal	Kings Park Stadium, Durban
Northern Transvaal	Loftus Versfeld Stadium, Pretoria
Orange Free State	Free State Stadium, Bloemfontein
Transvaal	Ellis Park Stadium, Johannesburg
Western Province	Newlands Stadium, Cape Town

== Log ==
1995 Currie Cup
Pos	Team	Pld	W	D	L	PF	PA	PD	TF	TA	Pts	Qualification
1	Natal	10	7	1	2	273	226	+47	26	21	15	Final
2	Western Province	10	7	0	3	256	199	+57	25	16	14	Final
3	Northern Transvaal	10	6	1	3	287	163	+124	32	14	13	
4	Transvaal	10	5	0	5	258	229	+29	25	18	10	
5	Eastern Province	10	2	1	7	162	302	−140	13	37	5	
6	Orange Free State	10	1	1	8	203	320	−117	18	33	3	

Rules for classification: 2 points for a win; 1 point for a draw

== Matches ==
The following matches were played in the 1995 Currie Cup:

=== Round 1 ===
8 July 1995

Eastern Province	31 – 17	Transvaal

Boet Erasmus Stadium, Port Elizabeth

8 July 1995

Northern Transvaal	33 – 3	Orange Free State

Loftus Versfeld Stadium, Pretoria

8 July 1995

Western Province	28 – 21	Natal

Newlands Stadium, Cape Town

=== Round 2 ===
15 July 1995

Natal	23 – 13	Northern Transvaal

Kings Park Stadium, Durban

15 July 1995

Transvaal	28 – 25	Western Province

Ellis Park Stadium, Johannesburg

Bye/s: Eastern Province, Orange Free State

=== Round 3 ===
22 July 1995

Northern Transvaal	19 – 22	Transvaal

Loftus Versfeld Stadium, Pretoria

22 July 1995

Orange Free State	34 – 36	Natal

Free State Stadium, Bloemfontein

22 July 1995

Western Province	32 – 6	Eastern Province

Newlands Stadium, Cape Town

=== Round 4 ===
5 August 1995

Eastern Province	3 – 24	Northern Transvaal

Boet Erasmus Stadium, Port Elizabeth

5 August 1995

Transvaal	37 – 19	Orange Free State

Ellis Park Stadium, Johannesburg

Bye/s: Natal, Western Province

=== Round 5 ===
12 August 1995

Natal	27 – 24	Transvaal

Kings Park Stadium, Durban

12 August 1995

Northern Transvaal	31 – 13	Western Province

Loftus Versfeld Stadium, Pretoria

12 August 1995

Orange Free State	19 – 19	Eastern Province

Free State Stadium, Bloemfontein

=== Round 6 ===
19 August 1995

Eastern Province	19 – 39	Natal

Boet Erasmus Stadium, Port Elizabeth

19 August 1995

Western Province	45 – 24	Orange Free State

Newlands Stadium, Cape Town

Bye/s: Northern Transvaal, Transvaal

=== Round 7 ===
26 August 1995

Natal	23 – 22	Western Province

Kings Park Stadium, Durban

26 August 1995

Orange Free State	21 – 53	Northern Transvaal

Free State Stadium, Bloemfontein

26 August 1995

Transvaal	45 – 16	Eastern Province

Ellis Park Stadium, Johannesburg

=== Round 8 ===
9 September 1995

Northern Transvaal	36 – 36	Natal

Loftus Versfeld Stadium, Pretoria

9 September 1995

Western Province	22 – 20	Transvaal

Newlands Stadium, Cape Town

Bye/s: Eastern Province, Orange Free State

=== Round 9 ===
16 September 1995

Eastern Province	23 – 31	Western Province

Boet Erasmus Stadium, Port Elizabeth

16 September 1995

Natal	22 – 19	Orange Free State

Kings Park Stadium, Durban

16 September 1995

Transvaal	12 – 18	Northern Transvaal

Ellis Park Stadium, Johannesburg

=== Round 10 ===
23 September 1995

Northern Transvaal	47 – 10	Eastern Province

Loftus Versfeld Stadium, Pretoria

23 September 1995

Orange Free State	41 – 28	Transvaal

Free State Stadium, Bloemfontein

Bye/s: Natal, Western Province

=== Round 11 ===
30 September 1995

Eastern Province	29 – 13	Orange Free State

Boet Erasmus Stadium, Port Elizabeth

30 September 1995

Transvaal	25 – 11	Natal

Ellis Park Stadium, Johannesburg

30 September 1995

Western Province	20 – 13	Northern Transvaal

Newlands Stadium, Cape Town

=== Round 12 ===
7 October 1995

Natal	35 – 6	Eastern Province

Kings Park Stadium, Durban

7 October 1995

Orange Free State	10 – 18	Western Province

Free State Stadium, Bloemfontein

Bye/s: Northern Transvaal, Transvaal

=== Final ===
14 October 1995

Natal	25 – 17	Western Province

Kings Park Stadium, Durban
