= Uva Province Rugby Football Union =

The Uva Province Rugby Football Union (UPRFU) is the governing body for rugby union in Uva Province, Sri Lanka.

== See also ==
- Sri Lanka Rugby Football Union
