= Ormond Taylor =

South African rugby union player

- Full name: Ormond Bruce Taylor
- Born: 5 June 1937 (age 89) Pietermaritzburg, South Africa

Rugby union career
- Position: Wing three–quarter
Provincial / State sides
Years	Team	Apps	(Points)
1956–63	Natal	48	
International career
Years	Team	Apps	(Points)
1962	South Africa	1	(0)

Ormond Bruce Taylor (born 5 June 1937) is a South African former international rugby union player.

Taylor was born in Pietermaritzburg and educated at Maritzburg College.

A wing three–quarter, Taylor represented the Junior Springboks on their 1959 tour of South America. He was in the Natal side which drew 6–6 with the touring 1960 All Blacks and the following year helped his province accomplish an undefeated season. In 1962, Taylor deputised for Jannie Engelbrecht on the left wing for the Springboks against the British Lions at Ellis Park, playing opposite the touring team's captain Arthur Smith.

== See also ==
- List of South Africa national rugby union players
