= Responses to the COVID-19 pandemic in June 2022 =

Aspect of viral disease pandemic

This article documents the chronology of the response to the COVID-19 pandemic in June 2022, which originated in Wuhan, China in December 2019. Some developments may become known or fully understood only in retrospect. Reporting on this pandemic began in December 2019.

== Reactions and measures in the Americas ==
=== 8 June ===
- Ontario lifts mask requirements for hospitals and public transportation, commencing 11 June.

=== 17 June ===
- The United States Food and Drug Administration authorizes the use of the Moderna COVID-19 vaccine for children between the ages of six months and 17 years, and the Pfizer-BioNTech COVID-19 vaccine for children between the ages of six months and four years.

== Reactions and measures in South, East and Southeast Asia ==
=== 18 June ===
- Malaysia and India have agreed to recognise each other's COVID-19 vaccination certificates.

== Reactions and measures in the Western Pacific ==
=== 16 June ===
- New Zealand's COVID-19 Response Minister Dr. Ayesha Verrall has announced that pre-departure COVID-19 test requirements for all travellers entering or transiting through the country would be lifted from 20 June 2022 onwards.

=== 28 June ===
- New Zealand's COVID-19 Response Minister Dr. Verrall announced that the COVID-19 vaccine mandate for Corrections and border workers would be lifted on 2 July 2022.

=== 30 June ===
- Dr. Verall confirmed that New Zealand would remain at the orange setting of the COVID-19 "traffic light" system due to rising case numbers.

== See also ==
- Timeline of the COVID-19 pandemic in June 2022
- Responses to the COVID-19 pandemic
