= Hugh Reece-Edwards =

South African rugby union footballer & coach (born 1961)

- Born: Hugh Meredith Reece-Edwards; 5 January 1961 (age 65) Johannesburg, South Africa
- Height: 1.89 m (6 ft 2 in)
- Weight: 96 kg (212 lb)
- School: Northlands Boys’ High School, Durban

Rugby union career
Amateur team(s)
Years	Team	Apps	(Points)
- Crusaders
Provincial / State sides
Years	Team	Apps	(Points)
1982–1995	Natal	165	(1114)
International career
Years	Team	Apps	(Points)
1992–1993	South Africa	3	
Coaching career
- Years: Team
- 2000: Sharks

Hugh Meredith Reece-Edwards (born 5 January 1961) is a former South African rugby union player. His regular playing position was Full-Back.

== Playing career ==
Reece-Edwards represented Natal and made his debut for the province in 1982. He played for Natal until 1995 in 165 matches and scored a record of 1114 points. He was a member of the Natal team that won the Currie Cup in 1990 and 1992.

Reece-Edwards toured with the Springboks to France and England in 1992 and to Australia in 1993. He made his test debut against France on 17 October 1992 at the Stade de Gerland in Lyon. He played in the following test against France and then in one test on the Australian tour. He also played in nine tour matches scoring 103 points (3 tries, 23 conversions and 14 penalties).

=== Test history ===
No.	Opponents	Results (RSA 1st)	Position	Tries	Dates	Venue
1.	France	20–15	Full-back		17 October 1992	Stade de Gerland, Lyon
2.	France	16–29	Full-back		24 October 1992	Parc des Princes, Paris
3.	Australia	20–28	Full-back		14 August 1993	Ballymore Stadium, Brisbane

== Coaching career ==
Reece-Edwards acted as the assistant coach to Ian McIntosh at the Sharks from 1996 to 1999. In 2000 he was appointed as head coach, but his tenure only lasted for one year and was he replaced by Rudolf Straeuli.

== See also ==
- List of South Africa national rugby union players – Springbok no. 569
