= 1999 Currie Cup =

Domestic rugby union competition

- Countries: South Africa
- Date: 2 June – 9 September 1999
- Champions: Golden Lions (9th title)
- Runners-up: Sharks
- Matches played: 94

The 1999 Currie Cup was the 61st season of the Currie Cup, South Africa's premier domestic rugby union competition, since it started in 1889. The competition was known as the Bankfin Currie Cup for sponsorship reasons and was contested from 2 June to 9 September 1999. (Note: There are some discrepancies. The match dates are given to be Wednesdays, Thursdays and Fridays, which is unlikely, since matches are generally played on Saturdays.)

The competition was won by the Golden Lions for the ninth time in their history; they beat Sharks 32–9 in the final played on 11 September 1999.

== Competition rules and information ==
There were fourteen participating teams in the 1999 Currie Cup. These teams played all the other teams once over the course of the season, either at home or away.

Teams received four points for a win and two points for a draw. Bonus points were awarded to teams that scored four or more tries in a game, as well as to teams that lost a match by seven points or less. Teams were ranked by log points, then points difference (points scored fewer points conceded). The top 4 teams qualified for the title play-offs. In the semi-finals, the team that finished first had home advantage against the team that finished fourth, while the team that finished second had home advantage against the team that finished third. The winners of these semi-finals advanced to the final, at the home venue of the higher-placed team.

== Teams ==
Location of teams in the 1999 Currie Cup

=== Team Listing ===
1999 Currie Cup teams
Team	Sponsored Name	Stadium/s	Sponsored Name
Blue Bulls	Blue Bulls	Loftus Versfeld, Pretoria	Minolta Loftus
Boland Cavaliers	Boland Cavaliers	Boland Stadium, Wellington	Boland Stadium
Border Bulldogs	Border Bulldogs	Waverley Park, East London	Waverley Park
Falcons	MTN Falcons	Bosman Stadium, Brakpan	Bosman Stadium
Free State Cheetahs	Free State Cheetahs	Free State Stadium, Bloemfontein	Vodacom Park
Golden Lions	Golden Lions	Ellis Park Stadium, Johannesburg	Ellis Park Stadium
Griffons	Griffons	North West Stadium, Welkom	North West Stadium
Griqualand West	Griqualand West	Griqua Park, Kimberley	ABSA Park
Mighty Elephants	Callmore Mighty Elephants	PE Stadium, Port Elizabeth	PE Stadium
Mpumalanga Pumas	Mpumalanga Pumas	Johann van Riebeeck Stadium, Witbank	Johann van Riebeeck Stadium
North West	North West	Olën Park, Potchefstroom	Olën Park
North West	North West	Rustenburg Platina, Rustenburg	Rustenburg Platina
Sharks	Sharks	Kings Park Stadium, Durban	Kings Park Stadium
Sharks	Sharks	University of Natal, Durban	xUniversity of Natal
SWD Eagles	SWD Eagles	Outeniqua Park, George	Outeniqua Park
Western Province	Fedsure Western Province	Newlands Stadium, Cape Town	Fedsure Park Newlands
Western Province	Fedsure Western Province	Danie Craven Stadium, Stellenbosch	Danie Craven Stadium

=== Changes from 1998 ===
There were name changes prior to this season:

- Eastern Province were renamed the Mighty Elephants
- Northern Free State were renamed the Griffons
- Border were renamed the Border Bulldogs

== Log ==
The final log of the round-robin stage of the 1999 Currie Cup: (Note: The log on the South African Rugby Union's page seems to use the old points scoring system of two points for a win and one for a draw, instead of the system that has four points for a win, two points for a draw and bonus points for losing by less than seven points or scoring more than four tries in a match. The log also incorrectly includes the results of matches in the semi-final and final.)

1999 Currie Cup log
Pos	Team	Pld	W	D	L	PF	PA	PD	TB	LB	Pts	Qualification
1	Golden Lions	13	11	0	2	457	239	+218	7	0	51	semi-finals
2	Sharks	13	10	0	3	458	272	+186	8	3	51	semi-finals
3	Free State Cheetahs	13	10	0	3	512	285	+227	7	0	47	semi-finals
4	SWD Eagles	13	9	0	4	450	295	+155	7	2	45	semi-finals
5	Blue Bulls	13	8	1	4	483	346	+137	5	2	41	
6	Griqualand West	13	7	0	6	441	328	+113	8	3	39	
7	Mighty Elephants	13	7	1	5	302	287	+15	2	3	35	
8	Border Bulldogs	13	7	0	6	313	323	−10	3	3	34	
9	Mpumalanga Pumas	13	6	0	7	344	362	−18	5	3	32	
10	Falcons	13	5	1	7	332	341	−9	5	3	30	
11	Western Province	13	5	1	7	358	365	−7	5	2	29	
12	Boland Cavaliers	13	3	0	10	319	518	−199	8	2	22	
13	Griffons	13	1	0	12	302	726	−424	4	1	9	
14	North West	13	0	0	13	228	612	−384	1	3	4	

Rules for classification: 4 points for a win; 2 points for a draw; 1 bonus point for a loss by seven points or less; 1 bonus point for scoring four or more tries in a match

== Matches ==
The following matches were played in the 1999 Currie Cup:

=== Round one ===
2 June 1999	Sharks	17–12	Falcons	Kings Park Stadium, Durban
		Scoreboard

3 June 1999	Blue Bulls	89–31	Griffons	Loftus Versfeld, Pretoria
	Try: Nicky van der Walt (2),Franco Smith, Jean Pieters, Casper Steyn (2), Wim Meyer (3), Marius Goosen, Wium Basson, Pierre Ribbens, Grant Esterhuizen; Con: Casper Steyn (12)	Scoreboard	Try: Sean Raubenheimer, Henk Deidericks, Giscard Pieters, Gavin Passens, Dono van Vuuren; Con: Arno de Jager (3)

3 June 1999	Boland Cavaliers	47–24	North West	Boland Stadium, Wellington
		Scoreboard

3 June 1999	Free State Cheetahs	41–22	Griqualand West	Free State Stadium, Bloemfontein
		Scoreboard

3 June 1999	Western Province	21–19	Border Bulldogs	Newlands Stadium, Cape Town
		Scoreboard

4 June 1999	Mighty Elephants	16–22	Golden Lions	PE Stadium, Port Elizabeth
		Scoreboard

=== Round two ===
9 June 1999	Free State Cheetahs	82–0	Boland Cavaliers	Free State Stadium, Bloemfontein
		Scoreboard

9 June 1999	Golden Lions	40–3	Border Bulldogs	Ellis Park Stadium, Johannesburg
		Scoreboard

9 June 1999	Mpumalanga Pumas	43–24	Griffons	Johann van Riebeeck Stadium, Witbank
		Scoreboard

9 June 1999	Sharks	54–15	North West	Kings Park Stadium, Durban
		Scoreboard

9 June 1999	Western Province	24–33	Blue Bulls	Newlands Stadium, Cape Town
	Try: Louis Koen, Hendrik Gerber; Con: Louis Koen; Pen: Louis Koen (4)	Scoreboard	Try: Wim Meyer (2), Pierre Ribbens; Con: Casper Steyn (3); Pen: Casper Steyn (4)

11 June 1999	Griqualand West	27–39	SWD Eagles	Griqua Park, Kimberley
		Scoreboard

=== Round three ===
16 June 1999	Border Bulldogs	16–17	Free State Cheetahs	Waverley Park, East London
		Scoreboard

16 June 1999	Falcons	13–15	Mpumalanga Pumas	Bosman Stadium, Brakpan
		Scoreboard

16 June 1999	Griffons	33–48	Golden Lions	North West Stadium, Welkom
		Scoreboard

16 June 1999	Griqualand West	29–23	Sharks	Griqua Park, Kimberley
		Scoreboard

16 June 1999	North West	23–58	Blue Bulls	Rustenburg Platina Rugby Club, Rustenburg
	Try: Johan Calitz, Werner Lessing, Gerrie Engelbrecht; Con: Morne Coetzee; Pen: Morne Coetzee (2)	Scoreboard	Try: Penalty try, Wim Meyer (5), Casper Steyn (3), Marius Goosen; Con: Casper Steyn (2), Franco Smith (2)

16 June 1999	SWD Eagles	45–22	Mighty Elephants	Outeniqua Park, George
		Scoreboard

17 June 1999	Boland Cavaliers	0–9	Western Province	Boland Stadium, Wellington
		Scoreboard

=== Round four ===
23 June 1999	Falcons	65–15	North West	Bosman Stadium, Brakpan
		Scoreboard

23 June 1999	SWD Eagles	36–24	Western Province	Outeniqua Park, George
		Scoreboard

24 June 1999	Boland Cavaliers	30–26	Mpumalanga Pumas	Boland Stadium, Wellington
		Scoreboard

24 June 1999	Border Bulldogs	15–26	Mighty Elephants	Waverley Park, East London
		Scoreboard

24 June 1999	Golden Lions	14–23	Free State Cheetahs	Ellis Park Stadium, Johannesburg
		Scoreboard

25 June 1999	Blue Bulls	16–27	Sharks	Loftus Versfeld, Pretoria
	Try: Casper Steyn; Con: Casper Steyn; Pen: Casper Steyn (3)	Scoreboard	Try: Russell Bennett, Stephen Brink (2), Hentie Martens, Andre Joubert; Con: Andre Joubert

=== Round Five ===
30 June 1999	Mighty Elephants	15–15	Western Province	PE Stadium, Port Elizabeth
		Scoreboard

1 July 1999	Boland Cavaliers	23–29	Falcons	Boland Stadium, Wellington
		Scoreboard

1 July 1999	Border Bulldogs	46–22	Griffons	Waverley Park, East London
		Scoreboard

1 July 1999	Free State Cheetahs	47–25	SWD Eagles	Free State Stadium, Bloemfontein
		Scoreboard

1 July 1999	North West	13–65	Griqualand West	Olën Park, Potchefstroom
		Scoreboard

2 July 1999	Mpumalanga Pumas	35–38	Blue Bulls	Johann van Riebeeck Stadium, Witbank
	Try: JP van der Mescht, Chaka Willemse, Torros Pretorius, Riaan Potgieter, Archer Dames; Con: Jacques Benade (2); Pen: Jacques Benade; Drop: Jacques Benade	Scoreboard	Try: Casper Steyn, Andre Snyman (2), John Williams, Wim Meyer; Con: Casper Steyn (4), Franco Smith; Pen: Casper Steyn

=== Round Six ===
7 July 1999	Sharks	30–22	Free State Cheetahs	Kings Park Stadium, Durban
		Scoreboard

8 July 1999	Blue Bulls	19–28	Golden Lions	Loftus Versfeld, Pretoria
	Try: Casper Steyn; Con: Casper Steyn; Pen: Casper Steyn (4)	Scoreboard	Try: Brett Johnstone, Thinus Delport (2); Con: Kobus Engelbrecht (2); Pen: Kobus Engelbrecht (3)

8 July 1999	Falcons	33–30	Border Bulldogs	Bosman Stadium, Brakpan
		Scoreboard

8 July 1999	Griqualand West	69–15	Griffons	Griqua Park, Kimberley
		Scoreboard

8 July 1999	Mighty Elephants	22–20	North West	PE Stadium, Port Elizabeth
		Scoreboard

8 July 1999	SWD Eagles	31–19	Boland Cavaliers	Outeniqua Park, George
		Scoreboard

9 July 1999	Western Province	15–22	Mpumalanga Pumas	Newlands Stadium, Cape Town
		Scoreboard

=== Round Seven ===
11 July 1999	Border Bulldogs	20–15	Blue Bulls	Waverley Park, East London
	Try: Kobus van der Merwe, Graham Carlson; Con: Wayne Weyer (2); Pen: Wayne Weyer	Scoreboard	Try: Jacques Olivier, Lourens Campher; Con: Casper Steyn; Pen: Casper Steyn

11 July 1999	Falcons	19–41	SWD Eagles	Bosman Stadium, Brakpan
		Scoreboard

11 July 1999	Golden Lions	35–31	Griqualand West	Ellis Park Stadium, Johannesburg
		Scoreboard

11 July 1999	Griffons	19–45	Sharks	North West Stadium, Welkom
		Scoreboard

11 July 1999	Mpumalanga Pumas	43–26	Mighty Elephants	Johann van Riebeeck Stadium, Witbank
		Scoreboard

11 July 1999	North West	19–62	Free State Cheetahs	Olën Park, Potchefstroom
		Scoreboard

=== Round Eight ===
14 July 1999	Boland Cavaliers	28–34	Sharks	Boland Stadium, Wellington
		Scoreboard

15 July 1999	Free State Cheetahs	17–38	Blue Bulls	Free State Stadium, Bloemfontein
	Try: Jan-Harm van Wyk, Chris Badenhorst; Con: Jannie de Beer (2); Pen: Jannie de Beer	Scoreboard	Try: Franco Smith (2), Casper Steyn, Clive Terre Blanche; Con: Casper Steyn (3); Pen: Casper Steyn (4)

15 July 1999	Griffons	20–47	Falcons	North West Stadium, Welkom
		Scoreboard

15 July 1999	Griqualand West	13–15	Mighty Elephants	Griqua Park, Kimberley
		Scoreboard

15 July 1999	North West	15–48	Mpumalanga Pumas	Olën Park, Potchefstroom
		Scoreboard

15 July 1999	Western Province	22–37	Golden Lions	Danie Craven Stadium, Stellenbosch
		Scoreboard

16 July 1999	Border Bulldogs	23–18	SWD Eagles	Waverley Park, East London
		Scoreboard

=== Round Nine ===
21 July 1999	Golden Lions	56–20	North West	Ellis Park Stadium, Johannesburg
		Scoreboard

21 July 1999	Mighty Elephants	21–6	Falcons	PE Stadium, Port Elizabeth
		Scoreboard

22 July 1999	Blue Bulls	56–24	Boland Cavaliers	Loftus Versfeld, Pretoria
	Try: Peet Arnold, Casper Steyn (2), Robbie Rein, Lourens Campher, Frans Allers, Wium Basson; Con: Casper Steyn (6); Pen: Casper Steyn (3)	Scoreboard	Try: Jannie Coetzee, Randle Julies, Marius Joubert, Daniel Whiston; Con: Connie Malherbe (2)

22 July 1999	Free State Cheetahs	54–42	Western Province	Free State Stadium, Bloemfontein
		Scoreboard

22 July 1999	Mpumalanga Pumas	22–18	Griqualand West	Johann van Riebeeck Stadium, Witbank
		Scoreboard

22 July 1999	SWD Eagles	102–0	Griffons	Outeniqua Park, George
		Scoreboard

23 July 1999	Sharks	50–24	Border Bulldogs	Kings Park Stadium, Durban
		Scoreboard

=== Round Ten ===
28 July 1999	Blue Bulls	36–32	SWD Eagles	Loftus Versfeld, Pretoria
	Try: Louis van Straaten, Peet Arnold, Clive Terre Blanche; Con: Casper Steyn (3); Pen: Casper Steyn (5)	Scoreboard	Try: Matt Frank, Paul Treu, Lodewyk Hattingh, Tiaan Joubert; Con: Pieter O’Neill (3); Pen: Pieter O’Neill (2)

29 July 1999	Border Bulldogs	21–5	Griqualand West	Waverley Park, East London
		Scoreboard

29 July 1999	Griffons	20–19	North West	North West Stadium, Welkom
		Scoreboard

29 July 1999	Mighty Elephants	46–24	Boland Cavaliers	PE Stadium, Port Elizabeth
		Scoreboard

29 July 1999	Sharks	25–17	Golden Lions	Kings Park Stadium, Durban
		Scoreboard

29 July 1999	Western Province	28–27	Falcons	Newlands Stadium, Cape Town
		Scoreboard

30 July 1999	Mpumalanga Pumas	20–37	Free State Cheetahs	Johann van Riebeeck Stadium, Witbank
		Scoreboard

=== Round Eleven ===
4 August 1999	Falcons	26–26	Blue Bulls	Bosman Stadium, Brakpan
	Try: Wynand Lourens (2); Con: Rynhard van As (2); Pen: Rynhard van As (4)	Scoreboard	Try: Frans Allers (2), Casper Steyn; Con: Casper Steyn; Pen: Casper Steyn (3)

4 August 1999	Free State Cheetahs	18–12	Mighty Elephants	Free State Stadium, Bloemfontein
		Scoreboard

4 August 1999	Golden Lions	44–21	Mpumalanga Pumas	Ellis Park Stadium, Johannesburg
		Scoreboard

4 August 1999	Griffons	23–49	Western Province	North West Stadium, Welkom
		Scoreboard

4 August 1999	Griqualand West	54–24	Boland Cavaliers	Griqua Park, Kimberley
		Scoreboard

4 August 1999	North West	26–32	Border Bulldogs	Olën Park, Potchefstroom
		Scoreboard

6 August 1999	SWD Eagles	24–18	Sharks	Outeniqua Park, George
		Scoreboard

=== Round Twelve ===
11 August 1999	Blue Bulls	26–32	Griqualand West	Loftus Versfeld, Pretoria
	Try: Jacques Olivier, Clive Terre Blanche; Con: Casper Steyn (2); Pen: Casper Steyn (4)	Scoreboard	Try: Gideon Watts, Jearus Nicholas, Casper Oosthuizen, Janneman Brand; Con: Edrich Lubbe (3); Pen: Edrich Lubbe (2)

11 August 1999	Boland Cavaliers	33–42	Border Bulldogs	Boland Stadium, Wellington
		Scoreboard

11 August 1999	Free State Cheetahs	84–30	Griffons	Free State Stadium, Bloemfontein
		Scoreboard

11 August 1999	Golden Lions	52–12	Falcons	Ellis Park Stadium, Johannesburg
		Scoreboard

11 August 1999	Mpumalanga Pumas	17–26	SWD Eagles	Johann van Riebeeck Stadium, Witbank
		Scoreboard

12 August 1999	Western Province	52–3	North West	Newlands Stadium, Cape Town
		Scoreboard

13 August 1999	Mighty Elephants	22–16	Sharks	PE Stadium, Port Elizabeth
		Scoreboard

=== Round Thirteen ===
18 August 1999	North West	16–31	SWD Eagles	Olën Park, Potchefstroom
		Scoreboard

19 August 1999	Border Bulldogs	22–17	Mpumalanga Pumas	Waverley Park, East London
		Scoreboard

19 August 1999	Falcons	26–45	Griqualand West	Bosman Stadium, Brakpan
		Scoreboard

19 August 1999	Griffons	17–32	Mighty Elephants	North West Stadium, Welkom
		Scoreboard

19 August 1999	Sharks	65–29	Western Province	Kings Park Stadium, Durban
		Scoreboard

20 August 1999	Boland Cavaliers	14–37	Golden Lions	Boland Stadium, Wellington
		Scoreboard

=== Round Fourteen ===
25 August 1999	Falcons	17–8	Free State Cheetahs	Bosman Stadium, Brakpan
		Scoreboard

26 August 1999	Blue Bulls	33–27	Mighty Elephants	Loftus Versfeld, Pretoria
	Try: Jaco Barnard, Johan Roets, Rudi Rohrs; Con: Casper Steyn (3); Pen: Casper Steyn (4)	Scoreboard	Try: Nardi Lombard, Tobie de Jager, Jack Alcock; Con: Gert Peens (3); Pen: Gert Peens (2)

26 August 1999	Griffons	48–53	Boland Cavaliers	North West Stadium, Welkom
		Scoreboard

26 August 1999	Griqualand West	31–28	Western Province	Griqua Park, Kimberley
		Scoreboard

26 August 1999	Sharks	54–15	Mpumalanga Pumas	Kings Park Stadium, Durban
		Scoreboard

27 August 1999	SWD Eagles	0–27	Golden Lions	Outeniqua Park, George
		Scoreboard

=== Semi-finals ===
2 September 1999	Sharks	45–8	Free State Cheetahs	Kings Park Stadium, Durban
		Scoreboard

2 September 1999	Golden Lions	81–21	SWD Eagles	Ellis Park Stadium, Johannesburg
		Scoreboard

=== Final ===
9 September 1999	Sharks	9–32	Golden Lions	Kings Park Stadium, Durban
		Scoreboard

== Honours ==
The honour roll for the 1999 Currie Cup was:

1999 Currie Cup Honours
Champions:	Golden Lions (9th title)
