= Wayamba Province Rugby Football Union =

The Wayamba Province Rugby Football Union (WPRFU) is the governing body for rugby union in Wayamba Province, Sri Lanka.

== See also ==
- Sri Lanka Rugby Football Union
