= North Central Province Rugby Football Union =

The North Central Province Rugby Football Union (NCPRFU) is the governing body for rugby union in North Central Province, Sri Lanka. It is responsible for overseeing and promoting rugby union in the North Central Province and is affiliated to Sri Lanka Rugby.

The current president of the NCPRFU is M. Jayanethti.

== See also ==
- Sri Lanka Rugby Football Union
