= John Plumtree =

NZ rugby union player & coach

- Full name: John Cyril Plumtree
- Born: 16 July 1965 (age 61) Hāwera, New Zealand
- School: Hawera High School

Rugby union career
- Position(s): Flanker, Lock
Senior career
Years	Team	Apps	(Points)
1985–1988	Taranaki	37	(8)
1988–1997	Sharks	80	(0)
1992	Hawke's Bay	11	(4)
- Correct as of 29 November 2025
National sevens team
Years	Team		Comps
1994–1995	South Africa		2
- Correct as of 25 May 2020
Coaching career
- Years: Team
- 1997–2001: Swansea
- 2001–2006: Wellington
- 2007: Sharks (assistant)
- 2008–2012: Sharks
- 2013–2014: Ireland (assistant)
- 2015–2018: Hurricanes (assistant)
- 2017–2019: Japan (assistant)
- 2019: Hurricanes
- 2020: North Island
- 2020–2022: New Zealand (assistant)
- 2023-2025: Sharks
- 2025-: Sharks (assistant)
- Correct as of 29 November 2025

John Plumtree (born 16 July 1965) is a New Zealand professional rugby union coach and former first class provincial rugby player.

He was previously the head coach for the Hurricanes and the Sharks, which competes in the Super Rugby and Currie Cup competitions.

As a player Plumtree won two Currie Cup medals with the Sharks (1990, 1996); and as a coach he guided the Sharks to Currie Cup wins in 2008, 2010 and 2024.

== Early life ==
Plumtree was born on 16 July 1965 in Hāwera, Taranaki. Plumtree and Lions coach John Mitchell were born and grew up in the same town, however, they only got to know one another later as players and coaches. Plumtree attended Hawera High School from 1976 to 1980.

== Playing career ==
Playing as a flanker in his native New Zealand, Plumtree represented Taranaki in the NPC 40 times, debuting in 1985. In 1989 he was selected to participate in trials for the All Blacks team.

Plumtree relocated to Durban, home of his South African wife. Reflecting on this move he later told the New Zealand Herald: "I did not want to get caught being a young rugby player in a small town for a long time. I thought if I got out of Hāwera for a little while another door might open up." So he accepted the opportunity to play for Durban High School Old Boys RFC, home to quite a number of overseas players at the time. These included Murray Mexted, Mike Teague, Chris Butcher, Martin Whitcombe and Peter Winterbottom.

In 1988 Plumtree was selected by the then Sharks coach, Ian McIntosh. MacIntosh would later coach South Africa's national rugby union team, the Springboks. From 1988 to 1997 Plumtree played 80 matches for the Sharks, winning two Currie Cup medals (1990, 1996). In 1992, he briefly returned to New Zealand to play 14 games for Hawke's Bay.

In 1994 Plumtree was selected for South Africa's Sevens side, and played two tournaments in Hong Kong.

== Coaching career ==
According to the BBC, Plumtree was an assistant coach with the College Rovers in North Durban, helping them win "three successive Natal titles and the South African club championship in 1994-95".

After retiring as a player, Plumtree coached the Swansea Rugby Football Club in Wales for five seasons, winning the Welsh Cup (1999), the Welsh League (1998), and the Welsh-Scottish League (2001). He is credited with "discovering" Gavin Henson while he was with Swansea.

In 2001 he returned to New Zealand, briefly acting as video analyst for Mitchell, the All Black coach at the time, working in a team that included Robbie Deans, the New Zealander who coached the Australian national team until the series defeat by the 2013 British and Irish Lions. Video analysis was in its infancy, and Plumtree was frustrated by the buggy nature of the system. He later confessed that while he learned a lot from Mitchell and Deans, "video analysis wasn't my thing."

Subsequently Plumtree was appointed coach for the Wellington Lions, a NPC team. Under his management, the Lions reached the final playoffs in 2003, 2004 and 2006.

Plumtree returned to South Africa after he found that he was not to be given a New Zealand side in the Super Rugby tournament. Despite his success with Wellington, he was not appointed to guide the Wellington-based Hurricanes, as had been expected

A spell as temporary head coach of the Sharks in 2007 was followed by a stint as assistant to Super 14 coach Dick Muir. Plumtree and Muir had been teammates at the Sharks during their playing days. Plumtree replaced assistant coach Theo Oosthuizen.

Plumtree was appointed head coach of the Sharks in 2008. He successfully coached the Sharks to their first Currie Cup win since 1996, for which he was named the 2008 Absa Coach of the Year.

Under Plumtree the Sharks had again reached the top of the Currie Cup log by September 2009. In August 2009 the Sharks' coach received the Coach of the Month award from Currie Cup sponsors Absa.

The 2010 season was not off to a good start after a terrible Super 14 season for the Sharks however in the shadow of the abysmal performance, the 2010 Currie Cup season was highly successful for Plumtree as the Sharks won the 2010 ABSA Currie Cup.

In 2013 he was confirmed as Forwards Coach for the Ireland national team, working alongside new head coach Joe Schmidt.

In the 2015 season Plumtree became the assistant coach of the Hurricanes Super 15 franchise with Chris Boyd being the head coach.

== Personal life ==
One of Plumtree's sons, Troy Plumtree, is a basketball player. Plumtree has another son, Taine Plumtree who is a professional rugby player for Scarlets and Wales.
