= 1993 Currie Cup =

Domestic rugby union competition

- Champions: Transvaal
- Runners-up: Natal
- Matches played: 31

The 1993 Currie Cup (known as the Bankfin Currie Cup for sponsorship reasons) was the 55th season in the competition since it started in 1889. Transvaal defeated Natal 21-15 in the final.

6 teams participated, playing each other twice over the course of the season, once at home and once away. Teams received two points for a win and one point for a draw. The top two teams qualified for the final.

This season saw no changes from the previous year.

== Teams ==
Location of teams in the 1993 Currie Cup

=== Team listing ===
Team	Stadium
Eastern Province	Boet Erasmus Stadium, Port Elizabeth
Free State	Free State Stadium, Bloemfontein
Natal	Kings Park Stadium, Durban
Northern Transvaal	Loftus Versfeld, Pretoria
Transvaal	Ellis Park Stadium, Johannesburg
Western Province	Newlands Stadium, Cape Town

== Log ==
1993 Currie Cup
Pos	Team	Pld	W	D	L	PF	PA	PD	TF	TA	Pts	Qualification
1	Natal	10	9	0	1	340	187	+153	42	18	18	Final
2	Transvaal	10	8	0	2	320	227	+93	36	21	16	Final
3	Eastern Province	10	5	0	5	227	243	−16	23	23	10	
4	Northern Transvaal	10	4	0	6	225	263	−38	20	26	8	
5	Western Province	10	2	0	8	194	275	−81	14	30	4	
6	Free State	10	2	0	8	199	310	−111	18	35	4	

Rules for classification: 2 points for a win; 1 point for a draw

=== Results ===
- Northern Transvaal 34 - 20 Western Province
- Northern Transvaal 27 - 14 Western Province
- Northern Transvaal 15 - 37 Eastern Province
- Northern Transvaal 18 - 12 Eastern Province
- Northern Transvaal 16 - 19 Transvaal
- Northern Transvaal 13 - 36 Transvaal
- Northern Transvaal 20 - 40 Natal
- Northern Transvaal 26 - 30 Natal
- Northern Transvaal 29 - 37 Cheetahs
- Northern Transvaal 27 - 18 Cheetahs

== Final ==
Natal	15 – 21	Transvaal

Kings Park Stadium, Durban
