= Trix Truter =

South African rugby union player

- Full name: Jacobus Tredoux Truter
- Born: 5 June 1939 (age 87) Ladysmith, Natal, South Africa
- Height: 1.88 m (6 ft 2 in)
- Weight: 88.5 kg (195 lb)

Rugby union career
- Position: Wing
Provincial / State sides
Years	Team	Apps	(Points)
1959–67	Natal	43	
International career
Years	Team	Apps	(Points)
1963–65	South Africa	3	(3)

Jacobus Tredoux Truter (born 5 June 1939) is a South African former international rugby union player.

Born in Ladysmith, Truter was a wing three–quarter and represented Natal.

Truter gained three caps in sporadic appearances for the Springboks during the early 1960s. He made his debut deputising for Jannie Engelbrecht against the touring Wallabies at Pretoria in 1963. His next opportunity came the following year when South Africa hosted France for a one–off Test match at Springs. He was a member of the Springboks squad for their 1965 tour and scored a try against the Wallabies at Lang Park in his only international match of the trip.

== See also ==
- List of South Africa national rugby union players
