= Dick Muir =

South African rugby union player

- Born: Dick John Muir; 20 March 1965 (age 61) Kokstad, KwaZulu-Natal
- Height: 1.85 m (6 ft 1 in)
- Weight: 89 kg (196 lb)
- School: Queen's College, Queenstown, Eastern Cape

Rugby union career
- Position(s): Centre, Flyhalf
Provincial / State sides
Years	Team	Apps	(Points)
1988–1996	Natal	148	(158)
1997	Western Province	27	(50)
Super Rugby
Years	Team	Apps	(Points)
1998	Stormers	8	(5)
International career
Years	Team	Apps	(Points)
1997	South Africa	5	(10)
National sevens team
Years	Team		Comps
1993, 1995	South Africa 7s		2
Coaching career
- Years: Team
- 1999: Cats (Asst. Coach)
- 2000–2001: Pirates Rugby Club
- 2001–2004: Tukkies
- 2002: Newport RFC (Asst. Coach)
- 2005–2007: Sharks
- 2008–2011: South Africa (Asst. Coach)
- 2009: Emerging Springboks
- 2009–2010: Lions
- 2017: Northwood Crusaders Rugby
- 2017–2018: Sharks (Backs/Attack Coach)
- 2021: Sharks Academy
- 2021–2022: Russia
- 2022–: Netherlands (interim)

Dick John Muir (born 20 March 1965) is a South African former rugby union player, and now the interim head coach of Netherlands national rugby union team.

Muir played for Natal for most of his career before moving to Western Province helping him to make his international debut for the Springboks in 1997. He won back-to-back Currie Cup titles with Natal in 1996 and a year later with Western Province in 1997. In 1998 he made his Stormers debut, where in late April 1999, Muir suffered a serious neck injury against the Auckland Blues which led to the centre retiring in mid May of that year.

== Playing career ==
Muir made his test debut for the Springboks at the age of 32, against Italy at Dall'Ara Stadium in Bologna, during the 1997 Springbok tour of Europe and scoring a try on debut. He then played in all test matches on the 1997 tour. Prior to 1997, Muir also toured with the Springboks to Argentina and Europe in 1996, playing five tour matches, scoring two tries.

=== Test history ===
No.	Opponents	Results (SA 1st)	Position	Points	Dates	Venue
1.	Italy	61–31	Centre	1	8 Nov 1997	Dall'Ara Stadium, Bologna
2.	France	36–32	Centre	1	15 Nov 1997	Stade de Gerland, Lyon
3.	France	52–10	Centre		22 Nov 1997	Parc des Princes, Paris
4.	England	29–11	Centre		29 Nov 1997	Twickenham, London
5.	Scotland	68–10	Centre		6 Dec 1997	Murrayfield, Edinburgh

== Coaching career ==
Muir started coaching in 1999 where he was an Assistant coach for the Cats and had his first head coaching role in 2001 with Pirates Rugby Club where he learnt his coaching trade and led the Johannesburg based side to the National Championship Title in the same year. In 2002 he became the head coach of the Tukkies first team and continued his winning form leading them to the a Championship winning campaign in 2003. During this same period he had a brief stint with in the Northern Hemisphere with Newport RFC before becoming head coach of the Sharks ahead of the 2005 Super 12 season.

Despite a poor start in is first year, finishing bottom of the table, he later coached the Durban Franchise to a near top-four finish in his second year to make the play-offs. By his third and final year at the side, he then led them all the way to the final, only to lose by a single point to the Bulls 19–20.

In 2008, Peter de Villiers took over from Jake White as the Springboks head coach following their 2007 Rugby World Cup triumph, and appointed Muir as his assistant to look after the backs. In 2009, the South African Rugby Union revealed an International Rugby Academy mirroring the New Zealand model and Muir was selected to lead the programme, thus leading him to coach the Emerging Springboks against the British & Irish Lions during their 2009 tour.

In October 2009, he was appointed as the head coach of the Lions for the 2010 Super 14 season. With Muir's commitments with the Springboks during the international periods, John Mitchell joined the franchise and would lead the side during the 2010 Currie Cup campaign. By the end of 2010 Muir was axed as the Lions head coach with Mitchell replacing him full time.

After the 2011 Rugby World Cup Muir left his position with South Africa but continued on with his role with the International Rugby Academy which took him into schools and academies within the country.

He came back onto the coaching scene in 2017 with Northwood Crusaders Rugby before joining back up with the Sharks as backs coach in 2018 but left at the conclusion of the 2018 rugby season. But returned in 2021 within the academy set-up.

On 23 December 2021, Muir was named as head coach of the Russian national team. However, because of the Russo-Ukrainian war, the Russian team was suspended from playing international matches as of March 2022. Muir therefore had his contract cancelled and on 2 June 2022 was named interim head coach of the Dutch national rugby union team.

== See also ==
- List of South Africa national rugby union players – Springbok no. 642
- List of South Africa national rugby sevens players

Sporting positions
Preceded by (New Zealand) Zane Gardiner	Netherlands National Rugby Union Coach (Interim); 2022	Succeeded by (Wales) Lyn Jones
