= Bill Payn =

South African rugby union player

- Full name: Cecil Payn
- Born: 9 August 1893 Harding, Natal, South Africa
- Died: 31 October 1959 (aged 66) Durban, Natal, South Africa

Rugby union career
- Position: Flanker
Provincial / State sides
Years	Team	Apps	(Points)
	Natal	59	
International career
Years	Team	Apps	(Points)
1924	South Africa	2	

Cecil "Bill" Payn (9 August 1893 - 31 October 1959), born in Harding, Colony of Natal, was a Springbok rugby player. He matriculated at Maritzburg College in Pietermaritzburg, Natal, South Africa. He played as a flanker. He was more commonly known as "Bill". He died in Durban, Natal, South Africa.

== Personal ==
He was born to James and Ellie (née Zietsman). He was a school teacher and married Winifred Ashton. Payn taught at Durban High School from 1915 to 1953. During world war two he was captured in Benghazi, Libya and served time in the Prisoner of War camps in Italy and Poland.

== Rugby ==
He played rugby for Natal and the Springboks. He made his International South Africa test debut on 16 August 1924, on the Kingsmead stadium in Durban, Natal South Africa playing as a flanker. This was a game between the Springboks and Great Britain. The Springboks won 7–3. He went on to play the next test against Great Britain as well, which was also his last. Payn's last test we played on 23 August 1924 at the Wanderers Stadium, Johannesburg, Transvaal, South Africa. The Springboks won 17–0.

== Other sport participation ==
He was a right arm slow bowler, who played cricket for his Province Natal. He ran the Comrades Ultra Marathon in 1922, and came 8th in this race, which was an up run held on 24 May 1922. His finishing time for the 90 km was 10:56:00. He ran the race in his rugby boots.
