= Tommy Bedford =

South Africa international rugby union player

- Born: Thomas Pleydell Bedford; 8 February 1942 (age 84) Bloemfontein, South Africa
- Height: 1.83 m (6 ft 0 in)
- Weight: 85 kg (13 st 5 lb)
- University: University of Natal

Rugby union career
- Position: Number 8
Provincial / State sides
Years	Team	Apps	(Points)
1961–1976	Natal	119	
International career
Years	Team	Apps	(Points)
1963–1971	South Africa	25	(3)

Thomas Pleydell Bedford (born 8 February 1942 in Bloemfontein, South Africa) is a South African former rugby union player who represented the national team, the Springboks, 25 times, also captaining the Springboks on three occasions. He became known for his opposition to South Africa's racial segregation policy of apartheid, especially as it affected sports.

== Career ==
Tommy Bedford was educated in Kimberley, Northern Cape at Christian Brothers College and in Durban at the University of Natal, where he studied architecture in the early 1960s and was captain of the university rugby team. At the university he held the relatively conservative attitudes typical of most white South African students at the time. In 1965 Bedford won a Rhodes Scholarship to the University of Oxford, where his exposure to a more international environment made him a committed opponent of apartheid, especially as it affected South African rugby.

Bedford played for and became captain of the Natal Province rugby team. His playing style was deeply influenced by the provincial coach Izak van Heerden, who, Bedford declared "..was streets ahead of his time. We had a genius for a coach...His teams played this instinctive, expressive, fantastic brand of rugby".

Tommy Bedford won the first of his 25 caps against Australia as a flank forward on 13 July 1963. Though he appeared as a 21-year-old flank forward in six Test matches, it was the number 8 position that established him as a player of outstanding quality on the international scene.

He played as a number 8 and was part of a back-row partnership with Jan Ellis and Piet Greyling. He debuted against the Lions in a Test at Loftus Versfeld in Pretoria, which was the first international to allow up to four injury replacements per team. He played number 8 in four Tests against the 1968 Lions; South Africa won the series 3–0 with one draw, and the winning margin in the first and third Tests was five points. The Durban architect also captained the team three times, twice against Australia and once against Scotland on the 1969 tour to Britain and Ireland.

Despite his prowess as a player and captain, it is thought that his relentless and uncompromising criticism of the apartheid system and the rugby establishment contributed to a premature end of his playing career. He retired from international rugby after the drawn Test with France in Durban in 1971. He thereafter practiced his profession as an architect.

== Notes and references ==
Sporting positions
Preceded by Dawie de Villiers	Springbok Captain; 1969	Succeeded by Hannes Marais
