= 2024–25 Sharks (rugby union) season =

The Sharks
- Full name: The Sharks
- Union: South African Rugby Union
- Emblem: Shark
- Founded: 1890 (Natal Rugby Union); 1995 (Sharks franchise)
- Location: Durban, KwaZulu-Natal, South Africa
- Region: KwaZulu-Natal
- Ground: Hollywoodbets Kings Park Stadium (Capacity: 54,000)
- CEO: Eduard Coetzee
- Director of Rugby: Neil Powell
- Coach: John Plumtree
- Captain: Lukhanyo Am
- League: United Rugby Championship
1st kit	2nd kit

Official website
- sharksrugby.co.za

The 2024–25 season is the Sharks's fourth season in the United Rugby Championship, their 31st season of professional rugby and their 137th sseaon of representative rugby since their foundation as the Natal Rugby Union. Along with competing in the URC and its South African Shield competition, the club will also participate in the 2024-25 European Rugby Champions Cup. During the season, they 'dropped' into the 2024-25 EPCR Challenge Cup, in which they were defending champions.

In April they confirmed victory in the URC South African Shield competition, their first URC silverware. They also confirmed a play-off place and home quarter-final in the main United Rugby Championship.

== Senior squad ==
The following players were squad members or featured for the Sharks during the 2024–25 United Rugby Championship season:

Sharks United Rugby Championship squad
**Props**: (South Africa) Dian Bleuler; (South Africa) **Ruan Dreyer**; (South Africa) Phatu Ganyane; (South Africa) Hanro Jacobs; (South Africa) **Vincent Koch**; (South Africa) **Ntuthuko Mchunu**; (South Africa) Mawande Mdanda; (South Africa) Khwezi Mona; (South Africa) **Ox Nché**; (South Africa) **Trevor Nyakane**; (South Africa) Dian Heunis; (South Africa) Braam Reyneke; **Hookers**: (South Africa) Ethan Bester; (South Africa) Bryce Calvert; (South Africa) Fez Mbatha; (South Africa) **Bongi Mbonambi**; (Scotland) **Dylan Richardson**; (South Africa) Siyabonga 'Scarra' Ntubeni; **Locks**: (South Africa) Meno Barnard; (South Africa) Thomas Dyer; (South Africa) **Eben Etzebeth**; (South Africa) Gerbrandt Grobler; (South Africa) **Jason Jenkins**; (South Africa) Coetzee le Roux; (South Africa) Corne Rahl; (South Africa) Emile van Heerden; (South Africa) Deon Slabbert; (South Africa) Reniel Hugo	**Loose forwards**: (South Africa) **Phepsi Buthelezi**; (South Africa) Nick Hatton; (South Africa) Batho Hlekani; (South Africa) **Siya Kolisi**; (Zimbabwe) **Tinotenda Mavesere**; (South Africa) Jannes Potgieter; (Democratic Republic of the Congo) Emmanuel Tshituka; (Democratic Republic of the Congo) Vincent Tshituka; (South Africa) James Venter; (South Africa) Jeandré Labuschagne; **Scrum-halves**: (South Africa) Bradley Davids; (South Africa) Tiaan Fourie; (South Africa) **Jaden Hendrikse**; (South Africa) **Grant Williams**; (South Africa) Tian Meyer; (South Africa) Cameron Wright; **Fly-halves**: (South Africa) **Jordan Hendrikse**; (South Africa) Siya Masuku; (South Africa) Jean Smith	**Centres**: (South Africa) **Lukhanyo Am**; (South Africa) Diego Appollis; (South Africa) Litelihle Bester; (South Africa) **André Esterhuizen**; (South Africa) Ethan Hooker; (Namibia) Jurenzo Julius; (South Africa) **Francois Venter**; **Wingers**: (South Africa) Eduan Keyter; (South Africa) **Makazole Mapimpi**; (South Africa) Yaw Penxe; (South Africa) Marnus Potgieter; (South Africa) Gurshwin Wehr; (South Africa) Jaco Williams; **Fullbacks**: (South Africa) **Aphelele Fassi**; (South Africa) Hakeem Kunene; (South Africa) Henry Immelman
(c) Denotes team captain, **Bold** denotes internationally capped, ^{ST} denotes a short-term signing.
Note: The following players either featured or were contracted by the Sharks during the 2024/2025 URC season but did not complete the season with the team: Dian Heunis, Deon Slabbert, Reniel Hugo, Tian Meyer, Gurshwin Wehr, Cameron Wright, Jeandré Labuschagne, Siyabonga 'Scarra' Ntubeni, Braam Reyneke.

== United Rugby Championship ==
=== Main table ===
Pos	Team	Pld	W	D	L	PF	PA	PD	TF	TA	TB	LB	Pts	Qualification
1	Leinster (CH)	18	16	0	2	542	256	+286	79	35	11	1	76	Qualifies for home URC quarter-final; Qualification for the 2025–26 Champions Cup
2	Bulls (RU)	18	14	0	4	542	361	+181	71	44	9	3	68	Qualifies for home URC quarter-final; Qualification for the 2025–26 Champions Cup
3	Sharks	18	13	0	5	436	402	+34	55	59	7	3	62	Qualifies for home URC quarter-final; Qualification for the 2025–26 Champions Cup
4	Glasgow Warriors	18	11	0	7	468	327	+141	70	40	10	5	59	Qualifies for home URC quarter-final; Qualification for the 2025–26 Champions Cup
5	Stormers	18	10	0	8	507	418	+89	66	57	11	4	55	Qualifies for URC quarter-final; Qualification for the 2025–26 Champions Cup
6	Munster	18	9	0	9	444	429	+15	67	59	11	4	51	Qualifies for URC quarter-final; Qualification for the 2025–26 Champions Cup
7	Edinburgh	18	8	1	9	471	407	+64	66	57	9	6	49	Qualifies for URC quarter-final; Qualification for the 2025–26 Champions Cup
8	Scarlets	18	9	1	8	427	382	+45	50	52	6	4	48	Qualifies for URC quarter-final; Qualification for the 2025–26 Champions Cup
9	Cardiff	18	8	1	9	409	477	−68	63	65	10	3	47	Qualification for the 2025–26 Challenge Cup
10	Benetton	18	9	1	8	393	478	−85	50	65	7	1	46	Qualification for the 2025–26 Challenge Cup
11	Lions	18	8	0	10	402	440	−38	53	60	5	3	40	Qualification for the 2025–26 Challenge Cup
12	Ospreys	18	7	1	10	437	454	−17	60	63	6	4	40	Qualification for the 2025–26 Challenge Cup
13	Connacht	18	6	0	12	420	472	−52	64	62	9	6	39	Qualification for the 2025–26 Challenge Cup
14	Ulster	18	7	0	11	414	506	−92	59	72	5	5	38	Qualification for the 2025–26 Challenge Cup
15	Zebre Parma	18	5	1	12	302	503	−201	38	72	3	4	29	Qualification for the 2025–26 Challenge Cup
16	Dragons	18	1	0	17	335	637	−302	43	92	1	4	9	Qualification for the 2025–26 Challenge Cup

Source: UnitedRugby.com
Rules for classification: Tiebreakers for teams tied on points: 1) Number of matches won 2) The difference between points for and points against 3) The number of tries scored 4) The most points scored 5) The difference between tries for and tries against 6) The fewest red cards received 7) The fewest yellow cards received.

=== Round 1 ===
8 Match 2025 (rearranged)	(1 BP) Sharks (South Africa)	25–22	(South Africa) Lions	Hollywoodbets Kings Park
	Try: Williams; Kolisi (2); Hatton; Con: Hendrikse; Pen: Hendrikse	Report	Try: Mafura; Kriel; Marais; Con: Lombard (2); Pen: Lombard	Attendance: 15,165

=== Round 2 ===
28 September 2024	(1 BP) Connacht (Ireland)	36–30	(South Africa) Sharks (1 BP)	The Sportsground, Galway
19:35	Try: Heffernan (2) 3' c, 50' m Forde 42' c Jennings 54' c Dowling 70' c Con: Ioane (1/1) 4'; Forde (3/4) 43', 55', 71'; Pen: Forde (1) 79'		Try: Esterhuizen (2) 21' c, 28' c Grobler 37' c Con: Masuku (3/3) 22', 30', 39'; Pen: Jo. Hendrikse (2) 24', 34'; Masuku 80'+1	Attendance: 4,217; Referee: Federico Vedovelli (Italy)

=== Round 3 ===
5 October 2024	(1 BP) Dragons (Wales)	30–33	(South Africa) Sharks (1 BP)	Rodney Parade, Newport
17:15	Try: Basham 17' c Coleman 26' m R. Williams 37' c Carter 54' m Con: L. Evans (2/3) 17', 38'; Pen: L. Evans 3'; Reed 58'		Try: V. Tshituka 21' m Ja. Hendrikse 39' c Julius 44' c Hooker 48' c Mbatha 80'+4; Con: Masuku (4/5) 40', 45', 49', 80'+7	Attendance: 4,591; Referee: Andrew Brace (Ireland)

=== Round 4 ===
12 October 2024	(1 BP) Benetton (Italy)	38–10	(South Africa) Sharks	Stadio Monigo, Treviso
16:00	Try: Odogwu 23' c Smith (2) 29' c, 68' c Mendy 37' c Marin 75' c Con: Umaga (5/5) 24', 31', 38', 69', 76'; Pen: Umaga (1) 10'		Try: Mchunu 80' c Con: Cronjé 80' (1/1); Pen: Masuku 17'	Attendance: 3,900; Referee: Sam Grove-White (Scotland)

=== Round 5 ===
19 October 2024	Sharks (South Africa)	28–24	(Scotland) Glasgow Warriors (2 BP)	Kings Park Stadium, Durban
15:45	Try: Kolisi 26' c Fassi 33' m Williams 70'; Con: Jo. Hendrikse (2/3) 27', 71'; Pen: Jo. Hendrikse (3/4) 11', 45', 66'		Try: Horne (2) 17' c, 36'; Darge 79' m Matthews 80'+1 c Con: Horne (1/2) 18'; Hastings (1/2) 80'+2	Attendance: 10,799; Referee: Chris Busby, Ireland

=== Round 6 ===
26 October 2024	(1 BP) Sharks (South Africa)	41–24	(Ireland) Munster (1 BP)	Kings Park Stadium, Durban
16:00	Try: Fassi 0' c Mapimpi 4' c Williams 23' c Esterhuizen 36' c Tshituka 65' c Con: Jo. Hendrikse (5/5) 1', 5', 24', 37', 66'; Pen: Jo. Hendrikse (2) 13', 48'		Try: Ahern 18' m Haley 30' m Nash 73' c Beirne 80'; Con: Burns (2/2) 73', 80'+1	Attendance: 19,465; Referee: Hollie Davidson, Scotland

=== Round 7 ===
30 November 2024	Sharks (South Africa)	21–15	(South Africa) Stormers (1 BP)	Kings Park Stadium, Durban
16:00	Try: Hooker 11' c Kolisi 16' c Esterhuizen 58' c Con: Masuku (2/2) 12', 17'; Jo. Hendrikse (1/1) 60'		Try: Zas 44' m penalty try 79'; Drop: Feinberg-Mngomezulu 24'	Attendance: 33,744; Referee: Marius van der Westhuizen (South Africa)

=== Round 8 ===
21 December 2024	Sharks (South Africa)	20–17	(South Africa) Bulls (1 BP)	Kings Park Stadium, Durban
17:00	Try: Ja. Hendrikse 18' c penalty try Con: Jo. Hendrikse (1/1) 19'; Pen: Jo. Hendrikse (2) 6', 69'	Report	Try: Wiese 24' c Vorster 28' c penalty try 52'; Con: Goosen (2/2) 24', 28'; Pen: Goosen (2) 47', 52'	Attendance: 34,827; Referee: Morné Ferreira, South Africa

=== Round 9 ===
28 December 2024	'(1 BP)' Stormers (South Africa)	24-20	(South Africa) Sharks (1 BP)	Cape Town Stadium, Cape Town
17:00	Try: Senatla 09' m Fourie 53' m Libbok 66' c J. du Plessis 77' c Con: Libbok (2/4) 68', 79'	Report	Try: Penxe 32' c Jo. Hendrikse 70' c Con: Jo. Hendrikse (2/2) 33', 72'; Pen: Jo. Hendrikse (2) 05', 74'	Attendance: 46,002; Referee: Aimee Bsrrett-Theron

=== Round 10 ===
25 January 2025	Cardiff (Wales)	22–42	(South Africa) Sharks	Cardiff Arms Park, Cardiff
17:15	Try: Mann 6' m Bowen (2) 36' m, 43' c Hamer-Webb 57' m Con: Sheedy (1/4) 44'		Try: Mbonambi (2) 14' c, 41' c Julius 17' c Mapimpi 31' c F. Venter 72' c Penxe 75' c Con: Jo. Hendrikse (6/6) 14', 18', 32', 41', 73', 76'	Attendance: 11,687

=== Round 11 ===
15 February 2025	Bulls (South Africa)	19–29	(South Africa) Sharks (1 BP)	Loftus Versfeld Stadium, Pretoria
17:00	Try: Wessels, 3'c Grobbelaar, 46', 77'c Con: Kriel, 4'; Chamberlain, 78'	Report	Try: Hooker, 9'c Hendrikse, 56'; Mavesere, 68'c Penxe, 72'c Con: Hendrikse, 9'; Masuku, 69', 73'; Pen: Hendrikse, 33'	Attendance: 23,307

=== Round 12 ===
1 March 2025	(1 BP) Lions (South Africa)	38–14	(South Africa) Sharks	Ellis Park Stadium, Johannesburg
14:30	Try: Botha 6' c F. Horn 14' c van der Merwe 37' m Kriel 41' m Cairns 59' c Lombard 70' c Con: Lombard (3/5) 7', 15', 60'; Steyn (1/1) 71'	Report	Try: Hooker 77' c Kolisi 80' c Con: Jo. Hendrikse (2/2) 78', 80'	Attendance: 11,542

=== Round 13 ===
22 March 2025	(1 BP) Sharks (South Africa)	35-34	(Italy) Zebre Parma (2 BP)	Kings Park Stadium, Durban
14:45	Try: Kolisi, 3'c, 31'c Julius, 11'c Koch, 36'c Hooker, 74'c Con: Hendrikse (5)	[ Report]	Try: Gesi, 13'c Ferrari, 22'c Prisciantelli, 46'c, 49'c Con: Montemauri (4); Pen: Montemauri, 29', 52'	Attendance: 9,935

=== Round 14 ===
29 March 2025	(1 BP) Sharks (South Africa)	7 - 10	(Ireland) Leinster	Kings Park Stadium, Durban
19:15	Try: Mbonambi, 52; Con: Hendrikse, 53'	Report:ESPN; Report:The Citzen	Try: McErlean, 19'; Penny, 48'	Attendance: 28,229

=== Round 15 ===
18 April 2025	(1 BP) Edinburgh (Scotland)	17-18	(South Africa) Sharks	Hive Stadium, Edinburgh
19:35	Try: Lang, 11'; Ritchie, 27'; Ashman, 47'c Con: Ashamn (1/3) 47'	Report	Try: Fassi, 41'; Mapimpi, 80'; Con: Hendrikse (1/2), 41'; Pen: Hendrikse, 3', 38'	Attendance: 7,774; Referee: Andrew Brace

=== Round 16 ===
26 April 2025	(1 BP) Ulster (Ireland)	19-22	(South Africa) Sharks	Ravenhill Stadium, Belfast
19:35	Try: Murphy, 7'; Postlethwaite, 10'; Doak, 30'; Con: Murphy, 10', 31'	Report, 2	Try: Mapimpi, 34'; Tshituka, 61'; Julius, 70'; Con: Hendrikse, 62', 71'; Pen: Hendrikse, 78'	Attendance: 16,350; Referee: Ben Whitehouse

=== Round 17 ===
9 May 2025	(1 BP) Sharks (South Africa)	29–10	(Wales) Ospreys	Kings Park Stadium, Durban
19:00	Try: Jenkins, 10'; Esterhuizen, 33'; Hooker, 51'; Buthelezi, 65'; Con: Masuku 11', 52'; Pen: Fassi, 34'; Masuku, 81'	Report	Try: Parry, 60'; Con: Edwards, 61'; Pen: Edwards, 2'	Attendance: 11,599

=== Rounds 18 ===
17 May 2025	Sharks (South Africa)	12 - 3	(Wales) Scarlets	Kings Park Stadium, Durban
19:30	Pen: Masuku, 39'; Fassi, 53', 69', 80'	Report	Pen: Costelow, 41	Attendance: 12,109

=== Play-offs ===
Quarter-finals
1	(Ireland) Leinster	33
8	(Wales) Scarlets	21
4	(Scotland) Glasgow Warriors	36
5	(South Africa) Stormers	18
3	(South Africa) Sharks	24 ^{(6)}
6	(Ireland) Munster	24 ^{(4)}
2	(South Africa) Bulls	42
7	(Scotland) Edinburgh	33

Semi-finals
1	(Ireland) Leinster	37
4	(Scotland) Glasgow Warriors	19
2	(South Africa) Bulls	25
3	(South Africa) Sharks	13

Final
1	(Ireland) Leinster	32
2	(South Africa) Bulls	7

==== Quarter-final ====
31 May 2025
5:30pm

Sharks (South Africa)	24-24 (a.e.t.)	(Ireland) Munster
Try: Hooker, 46'; Fassi, 68'; Mbatha, 73'; Con: Jaden Hendrikse, 47', 69', 74'; Pen: Jaden Hendrikse, 55'		Try: Nash, 10'; Josh Wycherley, 57'; Kilgallen, 61'; Con: Crowley, 11', 58', 62'; Pen: Murray, 77'
	Penalties
Jordan Hendrikse; Jaden Hendrikse; Davids; Jordan Hendrikse; Jaden Hendrikse; Davids	6-4	Crowley; Scannell; Murray; Crowley; Scannell

Kings Park Stadium, Durban
Attendance: 22,247

==== Semi -final ====
7 June 2025	Bulls (South Africa)	v	(South Africa) Sharks	TBC

== URC South African shield ==
Sharks won their first URC South African Shield.

2024–25 United Rugby Championship Regional Shield Pools
(South Africa) South African Shield
	Team	P	W	D	L	PF	PA	PD	TF	TA	TBP	LBP	Pts	Pos overall
1	(South Africa) Sharks (S)	6	4	0	2	129	135	−6	17	20	2	1	19	3
2	(South Africa) Stormers	6	3	0	3	142	130	+12	19	15	3	3	18	5
3	(South Africa) Bulls	6	3	0	3	151	141	+10	19	17	3	2	17	2
4	(South Africa) Lions	6	2	0	4	141	157	−16	19	22	1	1	10	11
If teams are level at any stage, tiebreakers are applied in the following order: 1. number of matches won 2. the difference between points for and points against 3. the number of tries scored 4. the most points scored 5. the difference between tries for and tries against 6. the fewest red cards received 7. the fewest yellow cards received
Green background indicates teams currently leading the regional shield. Upon the conclusion of the regular season, these teams win their respective regional shields. (S) : URC Shield champion

== European competition ==
=== European Rugby Champions Cup ===
European Rugby Champions Cup Pool 1
Pos	Team	Pld	W	D	L	PF	PA	PD	TF	TA	TB	LB	Pts	Qualification
1	(France) Bordeaux Bègles (1)	4	4	0	0	217	76	+141	33	12	4	0	20	Home Champions Cup round of 16
2	(France) Toulouse (5)	4	4	0	0	225	62	+163	33	9	3	0	19	Home Champions Cup round of 16
3	(England) Leicester Tigers (10)	4	2	0	2	134	149	−15	20	21	3	0	11	Away Champions Cup round of 16
4	(Ireland) Ulster (16)	4	1	0	3	102	163	−61	15	24	1	0	5	Away Champions Cup round of 16
5	(South Africa) Sharks (12CC)	4	1	0	3	76	163	−87	10	23	1	0	5	Away Challenge Cup round of 16
6	(England) Exeter Chiefs	4	0	0	4	83	224	−141	13	34	1	0	1	

Source: EPCR
Rules for classification: Tiebreakers for teams tied on points: 1) Number of matches won; 2) Difference between points for and against; 3) Total number of points for; 4) Aggregate number of points scored in matches between tied teams; 5) Number of matches won excluding the first match, then the second and so on until the tie is settled.

=== Round 1 ===
7 December 2024
13:00

(1 BP) Sharks (South Africa)	39–21	(England) Exeter Chiefs
Try: Buthelezi 20' c Mapimpi 23' m Williams 26' c Kolisi (2) 35' c, 55' c Con: Jo. Hendrikse (4/5) 21', 27', 37', 57'; Pen: Jo. Hendrikse (2/2) 45', 69'	Report	Try: Frost (2) 13' c, 40' c Feyi-Waboso 66' c Con: Hodge (3/4) 15', 40+1', 67'

Hollywoodbets Kings Park, Durban
Attendance: 10,452
Referee: Jeremy Rozier (France)

=== Round 2 ===
14 December 2024
17:30

(1 BP) Leicester Tigers (England)	56–17	(South Africa) Sharks
Try: Montoya (2) 9' c, 24' c Hassell-Collins 27' c Kata 34' c Pollard 39' c Poortvliet 43' c Clare 71' c Ilione 80+2' c Con: Pollard (6/6) 10', 25', 28', 35', 40', 44'; Shillcock (2/2) 72', 80+2'	Report	Try: E. Tshituka 20' c Hooker 60' c Con: Masuku (2/2) 21', 61'; Pen: Masuku (1/1) 3'

Mattioli Woods Welford Road, Leicester
Attendance: 17,168
Referee: Andrea Piardi (Italy)

=== Round 3 ===
11 January 2025
15:15

Sharks (South Africa)	8–20	(France) Toulouse
Try: Julius 66' m Pen: J.O. Hendrikse (1/1) 13'	Report	Try: Meafou 9' c Kinghorn 42' c Con: Ramos (2/2) 9', 43'; Pen: Ramos (2/2) 35', 40+2'

Hollywoodbets Kings Park, Durban
Attendance: 24,762
Referee: Luke Pearce (England)

=== Round 4 ===
19 January 2025
13:00

(1 BP) Bordeaux Bègles (France)	66–12	(South Africa) Sharks
Try: Penaud (6) 12' m, 17' c, 39' c, 66' c, 71' m, 75' c Lucu 43' c Boniface 49' c Moefana 53' c Nguimbous 78' c Con: Jalibert (8/10) 18', 40', 44', 50', 54', 67', 76', 79'	Report	Try: Masuku 3' c Kunene 7' m Con: Masuku (1/2) 4'

Stade Chaban-Delmas, Bordeaux
Attendance: 32,135
Referee: Christophe Ridley (England)

=== European Rugby Challenge Cup ===
By finishing fifth in their Champions Cup pool, Sharks qualified for the Round of 15 in the European Rugby Challenge Cup. As 12th seed, they were drawn away to French side Lyon.

Round of 16
3	(Scotland) Edinburgh	24
14	(South Africa) Lions	12
6	(France) Bayonne	22
11	(South Africa) Bulls	32
7	(France) Pau	24
10	(England) Bath Rugby	49
2	(France) Montpellier	17
15	(England) Gloucester	24
4	(Wales) Ospreys	36
13	(Wales) Scarlets	14
5	(France) Lyon	34
12	(South Africa) Sharks	21
1	(Ireland) Connacht	35
16	(Wales) Cardiff	20
8	(France) Perpignan	18
9	(France) Racing 92	24

Quarter-finals
3	(Scotland) Edinburgh	34
11	(South Africa) Bulls	28
10	(England) Bath Rugby	61
15	(England) Gloucester	26
4	(Wales) Ospreys	18
5	(France) Lyon	20
1	(Ireland) Connacht	40
9	(France) Racing 92	43

Semi-finals
3	(Scotland) Edinburgh	24
10	(England) Bath Rugby	39
5	(France) Lyon	29
9	(France) Racing 92	15

Final
10	(England) Bath Rugby	37
5	(France) Lyon	12

Round of 16

6 April 2025
18:30

Lyon (France) (5)	34–21	(12) (South Africa) Sharks
Try: Tchaptchet 16' m William 20' c Charcosset 27' c Maraku 37' m Rattez 67' c Con: Berdeu (2/4) 21', 28'; Méliande (1/1) 67'; Pen: Berdeu (1/1) 7'	Report	Try: Mbatha 4' c Rahl 69' c Mavesere 79' c Con: Masuku (1/1) 5'; Smith (2/2) 70', 80'

Stade de Gerland, Lyon
Attendance: 10,475
Referee: Federico Vedovelli (Italy)

Sharks are eliminated from the competition.

== Home attendance ==
As of 14 March 2025

Domestic League						European Champions Cup						Total	
League	Fixtures	Total Attendance	Average Attendance	Highest	Lowest	League	Fixtures	Total Attendance	Average Attendance	Highest	Lowest	Total Attendance	Average Attendance
2024–25 United Rugby Championship	10	198,119	19,812	34,827	9,935	2024–25 European Rugby Champions Cup	2	35,214	17,607	24,762	10,452	233,333	19,444
