= List of Sharks (rugby union) players =

This is a list of rugby union footballers who have played for the Sharks in Super Rugby, the Pro14 and United Rugby Championship competitions, and the European Rugby Champions Cup and EPCR Challenge Cup competitions. The list includes any player that has played in a regular season match, semi-final or final for the Sharks, ordered by debut date and name. The Sharks competed in Super Rugby as Natal Sharks in 1996 and 1997, Coastal Sharks in 1998 and the Sharks between 1999 and 2020, competed in the Pro14 Rainbow Cup in 2021, in the United Rugby Championship from 2021, the European Rugby Champions Cup in 2022/23, 2024/25 and 2025/26 and the EPCR Challenge Cup in 2023/24, 2024/25, 2025/26 and 2026/27.

== Super Rugby players ==
No.	Name	Caps	Tries	C	P	DG	Points	Debut	Last
1	John Allan	24	4				20	02/03/1996	24/05/1997
2	Mark Andrews	61	3				15	02/03/1996	11/05/2002
3	Steve Atherton	30	2				10	02/03/1996	08/05/1999
4	Wayne Fyvie	42	6				30	02/03/1996	13/05/2000
5	Adrian Garvey	37	4				20	02/03/1996	24/05/1998
6	Henry Honiball	43	9	62	60		349	02/03/1996	08/05/1999
7	André Joubert	34	17	16	15		162	02/03/1996	14/05/1999
8	Robbi Kempson	25						02/03/1996	24/05/1998
9	Dick Muir	12	1				5	02/03/1996	25/05/1996
10	Kevin Putt	35	4				20	02/03/1996	24/05/1998
11	James Small	13	13			1	68	02/03/1996	25/05/1996
12	Gary Teichmann	42	8				40	02/03/1996	17/04/1999
13	Jeremy Thomson	35	9				45	02/03/1996	24/05/1998
14	Cabous van der Westhuizen	22	7				35	02/03/1996	17/05/1997
15	Wickus van Heerden	27	3				15	02/03/1996	05/04/1998
16	John Slade	49	3				15	02/03/1996	13/05/2000
17	Dieter Kriese	24	1				5	02/03/1996	24/05/1998
18	Andre Barnard	1						09/03/1996	09/03/1996
19	Robert du Preez	6						09/03/1996	17/05/1997
20	Ollie le Roux	84	12				60	09/03/1996	21/03/2003
21	Jozuzi Joubert	21	11				55	17/03/1996	24/05/1997
22	Roland de Marigny	2						17/03/1996	27/04/1996
23	Walter Minnaar	18	3				15	10/04/1996	24/05/1998
24	Federico Méndez	1						05/05/1996	05/05/1996
25	Gavin Lawless	10	6	25	30		170	08/03/1997	17/05/1997
26	Dirkie Strydom	6	1				5	08/03/1997	03/05/1997
27	Danie van der Walt	3						08/03/1997	17/05/1997
28	Geoff Appleford	6	1				5	29/03/1997	17/05/1997
29	Jacobus van der Westhuizen	2						04/04/1997	17/05/1997
30	Pieter Muller	28	9				45	11/04/1997	13/05/2000
31	Ryan Strudwick	5						27/04/1997	24/05/1997
32	Ian Calder	2						03/05/1997	11/05/1997
33	Shaun Payne	21	5				25	11/05/1997	14/05/1999
34	Errol Stewart	2	1				5	17/05/1997	24/05/1997
35	Wayne Boardman	2						17/05/1997	24/05/1997
36	Warren Brosnihan	43	3				15	28/02/1998	12/05/2001
37	Joe Gillingham	20	3				15	28/02/1998	13/05/2000
38	Chris Rossouw	27	1				5	28/02/1998	13/05/2000
39	Stefan Terblanche	122	35			1	178	28/02/1998	25/06/2011
40	Nico Wegner	9						28/02/1998	14/05/1999
41	Boeta Wessels	8	1	1			7	28/02/1998	24/05/1998
42	Mornay Visser	23	1				5	28/02/1998	08/04/2000
43	Hentie Martens	21	3				15	28/02/1998	26/05/2001
44	Stephen Brink	18	4				20	07/03/1998	08/05/2004
45	Russell Bennett	6						20/03/1998	10/03/2000
46	Chris Pearson	1						25/04/1998	25/04/1998
47	Chad Alcock	20	4				20	27/02/1999	11/05/2002
48	Jacques Benade	3		2	3		13	27/02/1999	14/05/1999
49	Brad McLeod-Henderson	26	2				10	27/02/1999	10/05/2003
50	John Smit	125	8				40	27/02/1999	25/06/2011
51	Justin Swart	39	7	2			39	27/02/1999	26/04/2003
52	Charl van Rensburg	71	9				45	27/02/1999	14/05/2005
53	Brent Moyle	22	1				5	27/02/1999	25/02/2006
54	Deon Kayser	49	10				50	27/02/1999	08/05/2004
55	Henry Pedro	1						05/03/1999	05/03/1999
56	Morné van der Merwe	1						03/04/1999	03/04/1999
57	Etienne Fynn	32	1				5	30/04/1999	10/05/2003
58	Pieter Myburgh	1						14/05/1999	14/05/1999
59	Gaffie du Toit	27		27	49	1	205	25/02/2000	11/05/2002
60	Trevor Halstead	45	10			1	53	25/02/2000	14/05/2005
61	Ricardo Loubscher	36	4				20	25/02/2000	08/05/2004
62	Philip Smit	28	2				10	25/02/2000	14/03/2003
63	Albert van den Berg	94	12				60	25/02/2000	16/05/2009
64	AJ Venter	96	11				55	25/02/2000	17/05/2008
65	Morne Nell	9						03/03/2000	06/05/2000
66	Rodger Smith	11	2				10	03/03/2000	27/04/2002
67	Clinton van Rensburg	8	3	5	3		34	03/03/2000	06/05/2000
68	Craig Davidson	56	7				35	10/03/2000	01/04/2006
69	Gideon Watts	2						10/03/2000	30/04/2000
70	Jacques Greeff	6	1				5	18/03/2000	06/05/2000
71	Vorster Venter	2						08/04/2000	15/04/2000
72	Butch James	57	6	63	74	4	390	23/02/2001	06/07/2013
73	Gus Theron	5						23/02/2001	12/05/2001
74	Warren Britz	55	8				40	23/02/2001	19/05/2007
75	Lukas van Biljon	21	2				10	03/03/2001	10/05/2003
76	André Snyman	24	6				30	03/03/2001	10/05/2003
77	Deon Carstens	83	4				20	10/03/2001	06/03/2010
78	Eduard Coetzee	40	1				5	17/03/2001	14/05/2005
79	Dave von Hoesslin	7						24/03/2001	08/05/2004
80	Shaun Sowerby	24	1				5	30/03/2001	10/05/2003
81	Herkie Kruger	13		5	7	2	37	14/04/2001	26/03/2005
82	Thinus Delport	4	1				5	22/02/2002	13/04/2002
83	Werner Gey van Pittus	2						22/02/2002	23/03/2002
84	Rudi Keil	28	3				15	02/03/2002	14/05/2005
85	Nicky van der Walt	2	1				5	02/03/2002	15/03/2002
86	Wayne van Heerden	14	1				5	02/03/2002	18/04/2003
87	Johan van Wyk	5						13/04/2002	11/05/2002
88	Clyde Rathbone	3						20/04/2002	11/05/2002
89	Brent Russell	37	15	4	2		89	21/02/2003	12/05/2006
90	Wylie Human	10	3				15	21/02/2003	10/05/2003
91	Gary Botha	10	1				5	01/03/2003	10/05/2003
92	Luke Watson	20	1				5	01/03/2003	08/05/2004
93	Ryan Walker	3						08/03/2003	28/03/2003
94	Johann Muller	82	2				10	14/03/2003	01/05/2010
95	Greg Rawlinson	1						21/03/2003	21/03/2003
96	Roland Bernard	6	1				5	28/03/2003	10/05/2003
97	BJ Botha	56	3				15	28/03/2003	10/05/2008
98	Josh Fowles	2						18/04/2003	10/05/2003
99	Skipper Badenhorst	20						21/02/2004	11/04/2009
100	Nico Breedt	12	1				5	21/02/2004	05/03/2005
101	Adrian Jacobs	87	13				65	21/02/2004	25/06/2011
102	Henno Mentz	27	9				45	21/02/2004	02/05/2008
103	Gregor Townsend	7	1				5	21/02/2004	24/04/2004
104	Russell Winter	11						21/02/2004	08/05/2004
105	Solly Tyibilika	16	1				5	21/02/2004	04/03/2006
106	Falie Oelschig	7		1			2	21/02/2004	08/05/2004
107	Chumani Booi	5						21/02/2004	03/04/2004
108	Lawrence Sephaka	2						10/04/2004	24/04/2004
109	Johan Ackermann	31	2				10	16/04/2004	10/05/2008
110	Gcobani Bobo	13	1				5	25/02/2005	24/03/2006
111	Jacques Botes	115	27				135	25/02/2005	23/05/2014
112	Jaco Gouws	8	2				10	25/02/2005	23/04/2005
113	Dean Hall	1						25/02/2005	25/02/2005
114	Braam Immelman	9						25/02/2005	11/03/2006
115	Odwa Ndungane	135	32				160	25/02/2005	30/06/2017
116	Ruan Pienaar	67	10	34	37	2	233	25/02/2005	14/05/2010
117	Jacques Schutte	5						25/02/2005	07/05/2005
118	Danie Saayman	8						05/03/2005	29/04/2006
119	Bismarck du Plessis	130	20				100	05/03/2005	13/06/2015
120	Johan van Zyl	1						11/03/2005	11/03/2005
121	Wian du Preez	2						11/03/2005	19/03/2005
122	Sandile Nxumalo	7						19/03/2005	04/03/2006
123	Conrad Barnard	4		6	3		21	19/03/2005	29/04/2005
124	Bian Vermaak	1						19/03/2005	19/03/2005
125	Cedric Mkhize	7	4				20	16/04/2005	29/04/2006
126	Bennie Nortje	2						07/05/2005	14/05/2005
127	Brett Hennessy	1						14/05/2005	14/05/2005
128	Percy Montgomery	21	10	32	33		213	11/02/2006	19/05/2007
129	Dusty Noble	3						11/02/2006	04/03/2006
130	JP Pietersen	138	37				185	11/02/2006	09/10/2020
131	Andries Strauss	22	1				5	11/02/2006	14/05/2010
132	Heinke van der Merwe	8						11/02/2006	12/05/2006
133	Daniel Farani	5						11/02/2006	24/03/2006
134	Brad Barritt	37	2				10	11/02/2006	09/05/2009
135	Jody Jenneker	1						11/02/2006	11/02/2006
136	Craig Burden	55	4				20	18/02/2006	14/03/2020
137	Scott Spedding	1						18/02/2006	18/02/2006
138	Tony Brown	8		11	15	2	73	25/02/2006	29/04/2006
139	Waylon Murray	49	5				25	25/02/2006	22/05/2015
140	Keegan Daniel	119	16				80	01/04/2006	10/03/2018
141	Scott Mathie	5						15/04/2006	12/05/2006
142	Ryan Kankowski	104	19				95	03/02/2007	04/04/2015
143	François Steyn	75	6	28	59	7	284	03/02/2007	22/05/2015
144	Steven Sykes	69	9				45	03/02/2007	04/08/2012
145	Kees Lensing	4						03/02/2007	15/02/2008
146	Rory Kockott	50	2	45	42	1	227	03/02/2007	14/05/2010
147	Tendai Mtawarira	158	5				25	09/02/2007	27/04/2019
148	Bobby Skinstad	11	1				5	17/02/2007	19/05/2007
149	Grant Rees	1						30/03/2007	30/03/2007
150	Pat Cilliers	3						28/04/2007	14/05/2010
151	Jannie du Plessis	119						15/02/2008	13/06/2015
152	Jean Deysel	78	1				5	15/02/2008	15/07/2016
153	Frédéric Michalak	30	3	24	15	4	120	23/02/2008	04/08/2012
154	Epi Taione	3						29/03/2008	24/05/2008
155	Alistair Hargreaves	29	1				5	14/02/2009	25/06/2011
156	Luzuko Vulindlu	9	1				5	21/02/2009	09/05/2009
157	Ross Cronjé	1						21/02/2009	21/02/2009
158	Skholiwe Ndlovu	5						07/03/2009	11/04/2009
159	Riaan Swanepoel	20						14/03/2009	28/05/2011
160	Monty Dumond	6						21/03/2009	13/02/2010
161	Charl McLeod	73	5				25	28/03/2009	26/07/2014
162	Chris Jordaan	2	1				5	04/04/2009	11/04/2009
163	Gerhard Mostert	11						13/02/2010	25/06/2011
164	Willem Alberts	73	8				40	13/02/2010	13/06/2015
165	Wilhelm Steenkamp	5						19/02/2010	14/05/2010
166	Andy Goode	9		2	11	1	40	26/02/2010	01/05/2010
167	Patrick Lambie	71	12	90	169	1	750	20/03/2010	13/05/2017
168	Lwazi Mvovo	135	37				185	17/04/2010	29/02/2020
169	Wiehahn Herbst	40						01/05/2010	12/07/2014
170	Meyer Bosman	47	7	11			57	19/02/2011	13/07/2013
171	Louis Ludik	40	7		4		47	19/02/2011	13/07/2013
172	Jacques-Louis Potgieter	10	1	2	7		27	19/02/2011	04/06/2011
173	Eugène van Staden	13						19/02/2011	25/06/2011
174	Anton Bresler	42	1				5	19/02/2011	19/07/2014
175	Conrad Hoffmann	23						19/02/2011	29/05/2015
176	Lambert Groenewald	1						26/02/2011	26/02/2011
177	Ross Skeate	8						09/04/2011	10/03/2012
178	Marcell Coetzee	74	14				70	07/05/2011	09/04/2016
179	Dale Chadwick	44	1				5	24/02/2012	23/07/2016
180	Riaan Viljoen	23	8				40	24/02/2012	13/07/2013
181	Tim Whitehead	15	1				5	24/02/2012	28/07/2012
182	Paul Jordaan	43	9				45	24/02/2012	23/07/2016
183	Tera Mtembu	47	5				25	03/03/2012	14/04/2018
184	Marius Joubert	3						03/03/2012	06/04/2012
185	Jandré Marais	12	1				5	17/03/2012	13/07/2013
186	Kyle Cooper	48	3				15	13/04/2012	15/07/2016
187	Pieter-Steph du Toit	27						21/04/2012	14/03/2015
188	Cobus Reinach	57	10				50	23/02/2013	22/07/2017
189	Franco van der Merwe	16						23/02/2013	13/07/2013
190	S'bura Sithole	35	4				20	05/04/2013	30/06/2017
191	Sean Robinson	3						13/04/2013	25/05/2013
192	Andries Coetzee	1						20/04/2013	20/04/2013
193	Piet Lindeque	5	1				5	27/04/2013	25/05/2013
194	Derick Minnie	3	1				5	27/04/2013	10/05/2013
195	Danie Mienie	1	2				10	27/04/2013	27/04/2013
196	JC Janse van Rensburg	3						04/05/2013	17/05/2013
197	Edwin Hewitt	3						29/06/2013	13/07/2013
198	Jaco van Tonder	3						06/07/2013	19/04/2014
199	Fred Zeilinga	10	1	10	10		55	13/07/2013	13/06/2015
200	SP Marais	27	1	1	1		10	15/02/2014	18/04/2015
201	Lourens Adriaanse	62	1				5	15/02/2014	22/07/2017
202	Stephan Lewies	63	1				5	15/02/2014	25/05/2018
203	Heimar Williams	16	1				5	15/02/2014	09/07/2016
204	Etienne Oosthuizen	53	1				5	15/03/2014	22/07/2017
205	Tim Swiel	6		4	10		38	22/03/2014	05/07/2014
206	André Esterhuizen	79	11				55	22/03/2014	14/03/2020
207	Stefan Ungerer	17	5				25	29/03/2014	23/07/2016
208	Tonderai Chavhanga	5	1				5	19/04/2014	26/07/2014
209	Franco Marais	42						25/04/2014	25/05/2018
210	Thomas du Toit	75	7				35	05/07/2014	24/10/2020
211	Mouritz Botha	11						14/02/2015	29/05/2015
212	Renaldo Bothma	15	1				5	14/02/2015	13/06/2015
213	Matt Stevens	8						14/02/2015	29/05/2015
214	Marco Wentzel	16						14/02/2015	13/06/2015
215	Giant Mtyanda	13						21/02/2015	21/05/2016
216	Jack Wilson	5	1				5	28/02/2015	11/04/2015
217	Dan du Preez	53	14				70	14/03/2015	22/06/2019
218	Monde Hadebe	3						28/03/2015	18/04/2015
219	Lionel Cronjé	7	1	4	3		22	18/04/2015	13/06/2015
220	Khaya Majola	2						29/05/2015	13/06/2015
221	Cameron Wright	29	2				10	13/06/2015	13/11/2020
222	Hyron Andrews	49	3				15	27/02/2016	13/11/2020
223	Jean-Luc du Preez	45	6				30	27/02/2016	01/06/2019
224	Willie le Roux	13	3				15	27/02/2016	23/07/2016
225	Coenie Oosthuizen	44	2				10	27/02/2016	22/06/2019
226	Joe Pietersen	9	1	11	15		72	27/02/2016	14/05/2016
227	Michael Claassens	29	1				5	27/02/2016	15/07/2017
228	Philip van der Walt	44	1				5	27/02/2016	25/05/2019
229	Garth April	21	2	18	17		97	27/02/2016	23/03/2018
230	David McDuling	1						27/02/2016	27/02/2016
231	Juan Schoeman	44	1				5	27/02/2016	07/03/2020
232	Chiliboy Ralepelle	35	2				10	22/04/2016	21/07/2018
233	Ruan Botha	42	4				20	02/07/2016	08/06/2019
234	Rhyno Smith	13	1	1			7	02/07/2016	22/06/2019
235	Curwin Bosch	58	10	61	81	3	424	09/07/2016	13/11/2020
236	Lukhanyo Am	57	11				55	24/02/2017	31/10/2020
237	Kobus van Wyk	31	11				55	24/02/2017	01/06/2019
238	Clément Poitrenaud	4						24/02/2017	25/03/2017
239	Jacques Vermeulen	38	3				15	24/02/2017	22/06/2019
240	Jeremy Ward	30	4				20	24/02/2017	13/11/2020
241	Jean Droste	3						04/03/2017	15/07/2017
242	Benhard Janse van Rensburg	3		1			2	18/03/2017	20/05/2017
243	John-Hubert Meyer	28						18/03/2017	13/11/2020
244	Stephan Coetzee	3						25/03/2017	15/07/2017
245	Inny Radebe	2						01/04/2017	08/04/2017
246	Johan Deysel	4	1				5	29/04/2017	27/05/2017
247	Sbu Nkosi	40	9				45	06/05/2017	13/11/2020
248	Marius Louw	29	1				5	30/06/2017	13/11/2020
249	Robert du Preez	34	7	60	44		287	17/02/2018	22/06/2019
250	Makazole Mapimpi	32	14				70	17/02/2018	14/03/2020
251	Tyler Paul	30	2				10	17/02/2018	14/03/2020
252	Akker van der Merwe	23	6				30	17/02/2018	03/05/2019
253	Grant Williams	9						17/02/2018	31/10/2020
254	Louis Schreuder	40	1				5	03/03/2018	14/03/2020
255	Wian Vosloo	7						10/03/2018	09/03/2019
256	Ross Geldenhuys	5						10/03/2018	25/05/2018
257	Gideon Koegelenberg	7						10/03/2018	22/06/2019
258	Mzamo Majola	16	1				5	17/03/2018	13/11/2020
259	Aphelele Fassi	22	7				35	16/02/2019	14/03/2020
260	Phepsi Buthelezi	12						16/02/2019	13/11/2020
261	Khutha Mchunu	2						16/02/2019	30/03/2019
262	Kerron van Vuuren	27	5				25	16/02/2019	13/11/2020
263	Ruben van Heerden	25						09/03/2019	13/11/2020
264	Fez Mbatha	4						09/03/2019	19/04/2019
265	Luke Stringer	8						23/03/2019	22/06/2019
266	JJ van der Mescht	7						05/04/2019	13/11/2020
267	Dylan Richardson	8	3				15	25/05/2019	13/11/2020
268	Zee Mkhabela	2						01/06/2019	08/06/2019
269	Cullen Collopy	2						01/06/2019	22/06/2019
270	Ox Nché	12						31/01/2020	13/11/2020
271	Sikhumbuzo Notshe	10	1				5	31/01/2020	06/11/2020
272	James Venter	9	1				5	31/01/2020	13/11/2020
273	Sanele Nohamba	12	2	1	1		15	31/01/2020	13/11/2020
274	Le Roux Roets	7						31/01/2020	14/03/2020
275	Henco Venter	9						31/01/2020	06/11/2020
276	Madosh Tambwe	8	5				25	07/02/2020	13/11/2020
277	Boeta Chamberlain	1		1			2	15/02/2020	15/02/2020
278	Werner Kok	3	1				5	09/10/2020	06/11/2020
279	Manie Libbok	5	2				10	09/10/2020	13/11/2020
280	Dan Jooste	4	1				5	09/10/2020	13/11/2020
281	Mpilo Gumede	1						09/10/2020	09/10/2020
282	Thaakir Abrahams	1						09/10/2020	09/10/2020
283	Yaw Penxe	4						24/10/2020	13/11/2020
284	Michael Kumbirai	2						31/10/2020	06/11/2020
285	Thembelani Bholi	3						31/10/2020	13/11/2020
286	Anthony Volmink	1						13/11/2020	13/11/2020

== Pro14/United Rugby Championship players ==
No.	Name	Caps	Tries	C	P	DG	Points	Debut	Last
1	Lukhanyo Am	44	7				35	01/05/2021	25/10/2025
2	Curwin Bosch	43	5	87	45	1	337	01/05/2021	18/05/2024
3	Thomas du Toit	40	6				30	01/05/2021	31/10/2026
4	Aphelele Fassi	58	17	1	3		96	01/05/2021	21/02/2026
5	Reniel Hugo	33	4				20	01/05/2021	28/09/2024
6	Siya Kolisi	47	18				90	01/05/2021	16/05/2026
7	Fez Mbatha	51	6				30	01/05/2021	16/05/2026
8	Ox Nché	65	4				20	01/05/2021	31/10/2026
9	Sbu Nkosi	9	1				5	01/05/2021	26/02/2022
10	Sikhumbuzo Notshe	39	5				25	01/05/2021	18/05/2024
11	Yaw Penxe	31	7				35	01/05/2021	27/03/2026
12	Ruben van Heerden	17	1				5	01/05/2021	04/06/2022
13	Henco Venter	28	2				10	01/05/2021	04/03/2023
14	Jeremy Ward	15	2				10	01/05/2021	19/03/2022
15	Grant Williams	56	21				105	01/05/2021	21/03/2026
16	Phepsi Buthelezi	95	17				85	01/05/2021	10/10/2026
17	Kerron van Vuuren	46	7				35	01/05/2021	26/04/2024
18	JJ van der Mescht	3	1				5	01/05/2021	12/06/2021
19	Manie Libbok	5		4			8	01/05/2021	12/06/2021
20	Sanele Nohamba	5						01/05/2021	03/12/2021
21	Wiehahn Herbst	5						01/05/2021	16/10/2021
22	Ntuthuko Mchunu	73	5				25	01/05/2021	07/06/2025
23	Werner Kok	48	14				70	01/05/2021	01/06/2024
24	Jaden Hendrikse	69	4	5	1		33	08/05/2021	31/10/2026
25	Le Roux Roets	15	2				10	08/05/2021	17/02/2024
26	Anthony Volmink	13	5				25	15/05/2021	07/01/2023
27	Thembelani Bholi	5						22/05/2021	07/01/2023
28	Marius Louw	16	3				15	22/05/2021	04/06/2022
29	Hyron Andrews	27						05/06/2021	17/02/2024
30	Makazole Mapimpi	55	22				110	05/06/2021	09/05/2026
31	James Venter	47	2				10	05/06/2021	07/06/2025
32	Boeta Chamberlain	43	3	29	25	4	160	05/06/2021	18/05/2024
33	Khutha Mchunu	20	1				5	12/06/2021	07/01/2023
34	Khwezi Mona	16						12/06/2021	01/06/2024
35	Dan Jooste	23	3				15	12/06/2021	18/05/2024
36	Mzamo Majola	1						12/06/2021	12/06/2021
37	Thaakir Abrahams	14	5				25	25/09/2021	14/04/2023
38	Gerbrandt Grobler	42	6				30	25/09/2021	30/11/2024
39	Ruan Pienaar	5		2	2		10	25/09/2021	03/12/2021
40	Dylan Richardson	22	2				10	25/09/2021	28/12/2024
41	Mpilo Gumede	2						25/09/2021	07/01/2023
42	Murray Koster	7						02/10/2021	11/05/2024
43	Tian Meyer	3						02/10/2021	28/09/2024
44	Lourens Adriaanse	3						02/10/2021	03/12/2021
45	Marnus Potgieter	20	4				20	08/10/2021	24/04/2026
46	Joaquín Díaz Bonilla	8		4	2		14	16/10/2021	11/03/2022
47	Jeandre Labuschagne	33	1				5	03/12/2021	08/03/2025
48	Bongi Mbonambi	46	16				80	03/12/2021	03/01/2026
49	Ben Tapuai	25						22/01/2022	06/05/2023
50	Cameron Wright	25	1				5	26/02/2022	01/06/2024
51	Rohan Janse van Rensburg	22	6				30	23/09/2022	06/01/2024
52	Fred Zeilinga	1						23/09/2022	23/09/2022
53	Dian Bleuler	22	1				5	23/09/2022	11/10/2025
54	Carlü Sadie	18						23/09/2022	06/05/2023
55	Justin Basson	5						23/09/2022	27/11/2022
56	Nevaldo Fleurs	4		1			2	08/10/2022	06/05/2023
57	Eben Etzebeth	20	1				5	15/10/2022	10/10/2026
58	Vincent Tshituka	56	7				35	15/10/2022	31/10/2026
59	Francois Venter	40	1				5	30/10/2022	21/02/2026
60	Lionel Cronjé	10		4	1		11	27/11/2022	12/10/2024
61	Bradley Davids	19		2			4	27/11/2022	16/05/2026
62	Corne Rahl	38	1				5	07/01/2023	26/09/2026
63	Ockie Barnard	1						07/01/2023	07/01/2023
64	Ethan Hooker	38	12				60	07/01/2023	31/10/2026
65	Hanro Jacobs	48	1				5	04/02/2023	31/10/2026
66	Emile van Heerden	37	2				10	25/02/2023	31/10/2026
67	George Cronjé	8						21/10/2023	23/03/2024
68	Coenie Oosthuizen	9						21/10/2023	02/03/2024
69	Zee Mkhabela	5						21/10/2023	18/11/2023
70	Aphiwe Dyantyi	9						28/10/2023	18/05/2024
71	Marco de Witt	1						02/12/2023	02/12/2023
72	Joel Hintz	2						30/12/2023	06/01/2024
73	Siya Masuku	32	1	30	11		98	17/02/2024	23/10/2026
74	Eduan Keyter	10	2				10	02/03/2024	26/10/2024
75	Tinotenda Mavesere	14	2				10	02/03/2024	31/10/2026
76	Tiaan Fourie	2						02/03/2024	18/05/2024
77	Vincent Koch	36	3				15	23/03/2024	10/10/2026
78	Nick Hatton	25	2				10	19/04/2024	31/10/2026
79	Diego Appollis	3	1				5	11/05/2024	01/06/2024
80	Simon Miller	1						18/05/2024	18/05/2024
81	Ig Prinsloo	1						18/05/2024	18/05/2024
82	Braam Reyneke	1						18/05/2024	18/05/2024
83	Thomas Dyer	4						18/05/2024	16/05/2026
84	Ruan Dreyer	14						28/09/2024	18/10/2025
85	André Esterhuizen	32	10				50	28/09/2024	23/10/2026
86	Jordan Hendrikse	29	2	47	20		164	28/09/2024	27/03/2026
87	Jason Jenkins	36	4				20	28/09/2024	31/10/2026
88	Jurenzo Julius	29	8				40	28/09/2024	23/10/2026
89	Manu Tshituka	28	8				40	28/09/2024	31/10/2026
90	Trevor Nyakane	9						28/09/2024	15/02/2025
91	Gurshwin Wehr	1						28/09/2024	28/09/2024
92	Ethan Bester	9	1				5	30/11/2024	31/10/2026
93	Bryce Calvert	2						21/12/2024	28/12/2024
94	Deon Slabbert	6						25/01/2025	16/05/2026
95	Jannes Potgieter	4						15/02/2025	27/03/2026
96	Jaco Williams	9	4				20	01/03/2025	31/10/2026
97	Henry Immelman	2						08/03/2025	22/03/2025
98	Hakeem Kunene	7	1				5	08/03/2025	21/03/2026
99	Ross Braude	6	1				5	26/09/2025	16/05/2026
100	Christie Grobbelaar	2						26/09/2025	03/10/2025
101	Simphiwe Matanzima	4						26/09/2025	18/10/2025
102	Marvin Orie	6	1				5	26/09/2025	20/12/2025
103	Edwill van der Merwe	18	8				40	26/09/2025	31/10/2026
104	Batho Hlekani	3						26/09/2025	18/10/2025
105	Lee-Marvin Mazibuko	4	1				5	26/09/2025	20/12/2025
106	Eduan Swart	18						26/09/2025	23/10/2026
107	Jean Smith	9		16	2		38	26/09/2025	16/05/2026
108	PK Sobahle	1						03/10/2025	03/10/2025
109	Cameron Dawson	5						03/10/2025	31/10/2026
110	Cebo Dlamini	1						03/10/2025	03/10/2025
111	Mawande Mdanda	4						25/10/2025	03/01/2026
112	Phatu Ganyane	15	1				5	29/11/2025	23/10/2026
113	Matt Romao	8	3				15	29/11/2025	23/10/2026
114	George Whitehead	2		2			4	29/11/2025	20/12/2025
115	Le Roux Malan	5	2				10	29/11/2025	16/05/2026
116	Luan Giliomee	4	3				15	21/03/2026	03/10/2026
117	Zekhethelo Siyaya	8	1				5	18/04/2026	31/10/2026
118	Lili Bester	5	3				15	09/05/2026	31/10/2026
119	Vusi Moyo	4	1	12	2		35	16/05/2026	10/10/2026
120	Suleiman Hartzenberg	2						26/09/2026	31/10/2026
121	Darrien Landsberg	4						26/09/2026	31/10/2026
122	Janco Purchase	1						26/09/2026	26/09/2026
123	Esethu Mnebelele	4						26/09/2026	31/10/2026
124	Nemo Roelofse	1						26/09/2026	26/09/2026
125	Ivan van Zyl	5	1				5	26/09/2026	31/10/2026
126	Gianni Lombard	3	1	5	2		21	10/10/2026	31/10/2026
127	Stephan Lewies	3						10/10/2026	31/10/2026

== European Rugby Champions Cup/Challenge Cup players ==
No.	Name	Caps	Tries	C	P	DG	Points	Debut	Last
1	Curwin Bosch	12	2	31	12	1	111	10/12/2022	24/05/2024
2	Phepsi Buthelezi	20	4				20	10/12/2022	17/01/2026
3	Boeta Chamberlain	5	2				10	10/12/2022	08/04/2023
4	Eben Etzebeth	13	5				25	10/12/2022	03/04/2026
5	Gerbrandt Grobler	12	2				10	10/12/2022	06/05/2025
6	Jaden Hendrikse	18	6				30	10/12/2022	17/01/2026
7	Werner Kok	11	5				25	10/12/2022	24/05/2024
8	Siya Kolisi	10	3				15	10/12/2022	13/12/2025
9	Makazole Mapimpi	18	10				50	10/12/2022	03/04/2026
10	Bongi Mbonambi	14	4				20	10/12/2022	17/01/2026
11	Ox Nché	18	3				15	10/12/2022	03/04/2026
12	Carlü Sadie	5						10/12/2022	08/04/2023
13	Ben Tapuai	6						10/12/2022	08/04/2023
14	Vincent Tshituka	15	1				5	10/12/2022	03/04/2026
15	Francois Venter	18	1				5	10/12/2022	10/01/2026
16	Dan Jooste	7						10/12/2022	13/04/2024
17	Ntuthuko Mchunu	18						10/12/2022	06/05/2025
18	Hyron Andrews	5						10/12/2022	08/04/2023
19	Rohan Janse van Rensburg	5						10/12/2022	21/01/2024
20	Khutha Mchunu	1						10/12/2022	10/12/2022
21	Sikhumbuzo Notshe	8						10/12/2022	17/12/2023
22	Grant Williams	16	4				20	10/12/2022	13/12/2025
23	Thomas du Toit	5						16/12/2022	08/04/2023
24	Lukhanyo Am	13	5				25	16/12/2022	19/01/2025
25	Dian Bleuler	2						16/12/2022	06/05/2025
26	Lionel Cronjé	6		3	1		9	16/12/2022	21/01/2024
27	Hanro Jacobs	15						16/12/2022	17/10/2026
28	Marnus Potgieter	5	3				15	14/01/2023	03/04/2026
29	Kerron van Vuuren	8						14/01/2023	07/04/2024
30	Aphelele Fassi	13	6				30	14/01/2023	17/01/2026
31	Cameron Wright	3						14/01/2023	24/05/2024
32	Thaakir Abrahams	3						21/01/2023	08/04/2023
33	Emile van Heerden	11						01/04/2023	17/10/2026
34	Jeandre Labuschagne	12	1				5	08/04/2023	19/01/2025
35	Coenie Oosthuizen	3						09/12/2023	21/01/2024
36	Corne Rahl	13	2				10	09/12/2023	03/04/2026
37	James Venter	9	1				5	09/12/2023	07/12/2024
38	Ethan Hooker	12	2				10	09/12/2023	03/04/2026
39	Le Roux Roets	3	1				5	09/12/2023	21/01/2024
40	Tinotenda Mavesere	8	1				5	13/01/2024	17/10/2026
41	Fez Mbatha	6	1				5	13/01/2024	07/12/2025
42	Eduan Keyter	3						13/01/2024	14/12/2024
43	Khwezi Mona	1						13/01/2024	13/01/2024
44	Diego Appollis	2						13/01/2024	14/12/2024
45	Vincent Koch	8	2				10	07/04/2024	03/04/2026
46	Siya Masuku	11	2	20	17		101	07/04/2024	03/04/2026
47	Dylan Richardson	5						24/05/2024	19/01/2025
48	André Esterhuizen	3						07/12/2024	13/12/2025
49	Jordan Hendrikse	7		14	3		37	07/12/2024	17/10/2026
50	Trevor Nyakane	4						07/12/2024	19/01/2025
51	Jason Jenkins	6						07/12/2024	17/01/2026
52	Yaw Penxe	7						14/12/2024	17/01/2026
53	Manu Tshituka	6	3				15	14/12/2024	17/10/2026
54	Bradley Davids	5						14/12/2024	17/10/2026
55	Ethan Bester	6						14/12/2024	17/10/2026
56	Hakeem Kunene	8	1				5	14/12/2024	03/04/2026
57	Phatu Ganyane	5						14/12/2024	17/10/2026
58	Ruan Dreyer	2						11/01/2025	06/05/2025
59	Jurenzo Julius	6	2				10	11/01/2025	17/10/2026
60	Nick Hatton	8	2				10	11/01/2025	17/10/2026
61	Lili Bester	2	2				10	06/05/2025	17/10/2026
62	Jannes Potgieter	3						06/05/2025	03/04/2026
63	Batho Hlekani	2						06/05/2025	07/12/2025
64	Mawande Mdanda	5						06/05/2025	03/04/2026
65	Jean Smith	4		2	4		16	06/05/2025	03/04/2026
66	Tiaan Fourie	1						06/05/2025	06/05/2025
67	Ross Braude	4	1				5	07/12/2025	03/04/2026
68	Le Roux Malan	4	1				5	07/12/2025	03/04/2026
69	Lee-Marvin Mazibuko	4						07/12/2025	03/04/2026
70	Marvin Orie	2						07/12/2025	13/12/2025
71	Matt Romao	5						07/12/2025	17/10/2026
72	JJ Scheepers	1						07/12/2025	07/12/2025
73	Eduan Swart	5						07/12/2025	03/04/2026
74	PK Sobahle	2	1				5	07/12/2025	17/01/2026
75	Cebo Dlamini	1						07/12/2025	07/12/2025
76	Simphiwe Ngobese	1						07/12/2025	07/12/2025
77	Edwill van der Merwe	2	1				5	13/12/2025	03/04/2026
78	George Whitehead	1		4			8	13/12/2025	13/12/2025
79	Ceano Everson	2						10/01/2026	03/04/2026
80	Deon Slabbert	2						03/04/2026	17/10/2026
81	Suleiman Hartzenberg	1						17/10/2026	17/10/2026
82	Murray Koster	1						17/10/2026	17/10/2026
83	Stephan Lewies	1						17/10/2026	17/10/2026
84	Zekhethelo Siyaya	1	1				5	17/10/2026	17/10/2026
85	Ivan van Zyl	1						17/10/2026	17/10/2026
86	Jaco Williams	1	1				5	17/10/2026	17/10/2026
87	Cameron Dawson	1						17/10/2026	17/10/2026
88	Esethu Mnebelele	1						17/10/2026	17/10/2026
89	Nemo Roelofse	1						17/10/2026	17/10/2026
