= 2025–26 Sharks (rugby union) season =

The Sharks
- Full name: The Sharks
- Union: South African Rugby Union
- Emblem: Shark
- Founded: 1890 (Natal Rugby Union); 1995 (Sharks franchise)
- Location: Durban, KwaZulu-Natal, South Africa
- Region: KwaZulu-Natal
- Ground: Hollywoodbets Kings Park Stadium (Capacity: 54,000)
- CEO: Eduard Coetzee
- Director of Rugby: Neil Powell
- Coach: John Plumtree
- Captain: Lukhanyo Am
- League: United Rugby Championship
1st kit	2nd kit

Official website
- sharksrugby.co.za

The 2025–26 season is the Sharks's fifth season in the United Rugby Championship, their 32nd season of professional rugby and their 138th sseaon of representative rugby since their foundation as the Natal Rugby Union. Along with competing in the URC and its South African Shield competition (the latter of which they enter as champions), the club will also participate in the 2025-26 European Rugby Champions Cup.

== United Rugby Championship ==
=== Main table ===
Pos	Team	Pld	W	D	L	PF	PA	PD	TF	TA	TB	LB	Pts	Qualification
1	Glasgow Warriors	14	11	0	3	389	197	+192	58	27	9	2	55	Qualification for the Champions Cup and knockout stage
2	Stormers	14	11	0	3	378	239	+139	48	31	7	0	51	Qualification for the Champions Cup and knockout stage
3	Ulster	14	9	0	5	399	286	+113	57	40	8	3	47	Qualification for the Champions Cup and knockout stage
4	Leinster	14	9	0	5	361	299	+62	54	41	9	1	46	Qualification for the Champions Cup and knockout stage
5	Lions	14	8	1	5	421	385	+36	57	57	7	2	43	Qualification for the Champions Cup and knockout stage
6	Cardiff	14	8	0	6	262	271	−9	38	38	5	4	41	Qualification for the Champions Cup and knockout stage
7	Munster	14	8	0	6	279	304	−25	41	41	6	3	41	Qualification for the Champions Cup and knockout stage
8	Bulls	14	8	0	6	397	340	+57	58	49	7	1	40	Qualification for the Champions Cup and knockout stage
9	Connacht	14	7	0	7	336	326	+10	46	46	7	4	39	Qualification for the Challenge Cup
10	Sharks	14	6	1	7	322	348	−26	48	45	6	1	33	Qualification for the Challenge Cup
11	Ospreys	14	5	2	7	293	325	−32	44	50	4	2	30	Qualification for the Challenge Cup
12	Benetton	14	5	2	7	257	331	−74	31	45	3	1	28	Qualification for the Challenge Cup
13	Edinburgh	14	4	0	10	269	340	−71	42	52	3	4	23	Qualification for the Challenge Cup
14	Scarlets	14	4	1	9	261	347	−86	37	50	1	2	21	Qualification for the Challenge Cup
15	Dragons	14	2	3	9	274	357	−83	36	53	3	4	21	Qualification for the Challenge Cup
16	Zebre Parma (E)	14	2	0	12	226	429	−203	31	61	2	2	12	Qualification for the Challenge Cup

Updated to match(es) played on 28 March 2026. Source: UnitedRugby.com
Rules for classification: Tiebreakers for teams tied on points: 1) Number of matches won 2) The difference between points for and points against 3) The number of tries scored 4) The most points scored 5) The difference between tries for and tries against 6) The fewest red cards received 7) The fewest yellow cards received.

26 September 2025	(1 BP) Glasgow Warriors (Scotland)	35 – 19	(South Africa) Sharks	Scotstoun Stadium, Glasgow
20:05	Try: Rowe (14'); McDowall (32'); Darge (49'); Dobie (70') penalty try (78'); Con: Horne(15', 33', 51', 71')	Report, 2	Try: E v.d.Merwe (9'); Tshituka (40'); Am (66'); Con: Hendrikse (41', 67'); Cards: Mavesere (yellow card) 77' to F.T.'; Mazibujo (yellow card) 79' to F.T.'	Attendance: 6 775; Referee: Keith David

3 October 2025	Dragons (Wales)	17 – 17	(South Africa) Sharks	Rodney Parade, Newport
20:05	Try: Wainwright 15'; O'Brien 26'; Con: de Beer (2/2) 16', 27'; Pen: de Beer (1/1) 66'; Cards: Coleman (yellow card) 73'	Report	Try: Orie 8'; Tshituka 38'; Con: Smith (2/2) 9', 39'; Pen: Smith (1/1) 19'	Attendance: 4 889; Referee: Filippo Russo

11 October 2025	(1 BP) Leinster (Ireland)	31 – 5	(South Africa) Sharks	Aviva Stadium, Dublin
17:30	Try: Jamie Osborne (12'); Jimmy O'Brien (23') v.d. Flier (27'); Deegan (49'); Gus McCarthy (71'); Con: Harry Byrne(13', 23', 28'); Cards: Boyle (yellow card) 74'	Report	Try: Hooker(30')	Attendance: 17,549

18 October 2025	(1 BP) Sharks (South Africa)	26 – 34	(Ireland) Ulster (1 BP)	Kings Park Stadium, Durban
15:00	Try: Siya Kolisi(33'); Makazole Mapimpi(49'); Andre Esterhuizen(71') penalty try Con: Siya Masuku (50'); Jordan Hendrikse (72'); Cards: O'Toole (yellow card) 61'	Report	Try: Lowry (6'); Werner Kok (21'); Stewart (56'); Reid (66'); Con: Doak (7', 21', 57', 68'); Pen: Doak (16', 37'); Cards: Mapimpi (red card); Koch (yellow card) 51'	Referee: Ben Whitehouse

25 October 2025	(1 PT) Sharks (South Africa)	29 – 19	(Wales) Scarlets	Kings Park Stadium, Durban
15:00	Try: V Tshituka (5'm); E Tshituka (19'c); Mazibuko (28'c); Kolisi (49'c); Con: Jean Smith (20', 29', 50'); Pen: Jean Smith (64')	Report	Try: v.d. Merwe (16'c); Murray (21'c); Rogers (45'); Con: Costelow (17', 22'); Cards: Plumtree (yellow card) 72'	Attendance: 9,528; Referee: Sam Grove-White (Scotland)

29 November 2025	(1 BP) Connacht (Ireland)	44 – 17	(South Africa) Sharks	The Sportsground, Galway
19:45	Try: Boyle (17' c); Mullins (31' c); Gavin (58' c); Devine (72' c); Illo (79' c); Con: Naughton (19', 32', 58', 73', 80'); Pen: Naughton (8', 27', 42')	Report	Try: Mbatha (15' m); Mapimpi (66' m) van Heerden (75' c); Con: Jordan Hendrikse (75'); Cards: Jenkins (yellow card) 28' to 38'	Attendance: 3,928; Referee: Ben Whitehouse (Wales)

20 December 2025	Sharks (South Africa)	21 – 12	(South Africa) Bulls	Kings Park Stadium, Durban
16:00	Try: Kunene 15' c Kolisi 71' c v.d.Merwe 77' c Con: Hendrikse 16'; Whitehead (2) 72', 78'	Report	Pen: Pollard (4) 19', 24', 38', 57'; Cards: Kriel (yellow card) 29'	Attendance: 44,517; Referee: Griffin Colby (South Africa)

TBC	(South Africa) Lions	v	(South Africa) Sharks	Emirates Airline Park
TBC

3 January 2026	(2 BP) Sharks (South Africa)	22 – 23	(South Africa) Lions	Kings Park Stadium, Durban
13:30	Try: E. Tshituka 15' m Kolisi 25' c Jenkins 39' m van der Merwe 58' m Con: Jo. Hendrikse (1/4) 26'		Try: Oosthuizen 7' c F. Horn 10' m Pead 80+1' m Con: Smith (1/3) 8'; Pen: Smith (2/2) 4', 32'; Cards: Venter (yellow card) 39'	Attendance: 20,622; Referee: Christopher Allison

24 January 2026	Stormers (South Africa)	19 – 30	(South Africa) Sharks (1 BP)	Cape Town Stadium
17:30	Try: Weillemse (2) 7' m, 27' c penalty try 78'; Con: Feinberg-Mngomezulu (1/2) 37'; Cards: Moerat (yellow card) 47'; Sandi (yellow card) 71''	Report	Try: Jenkins 5' c Williams 12' c Buthelezi 47' m Esterhuizen 73' m Con: Hendrikse (2/4) 6', 13; Pen: Hendrikse (2) 17', 68'; Cards: Tshituka (yellow card) 78'	Attendance: 52,087; Referee: Aimee Barrett-Theron (RSA)

31 January 2026	(1 BP) Sharks (South Africa)	36 – 24	(South Africa) Stormers	Kings Park Stadium, Durban
15:00	Try: Williams 12' c Hooker 25' c Esterhuizen 48' c Williams 53' c, 72'm Con: Hendrikse (4/5) 13', 26', 49', 53'; Pen: Hendrikse 69'	Report	Try: Reinach 1' m de Villiers 43' c Con: Feinberg-Mngomezulu (1/2) 44'; Pen: Feinberg-Mngomezulu (4) 16', 20', 39', 40+3'; Cards: de Villiers (yellow card) 9' van Heerden (yellow card) 49'	Attendance: 25,364; Referee: Christopher Allison

Sat, Feb 28	(South Africa) Bulls	v	(South Africa) Sharks	Loftus Versfeld Stadium
15:00

Sat, Mar 21	(South Africa) Sharks	v	(Ireland) Munster	s Kings Park
15:00

Fri, Mar 27	(South Africa) Sharks	v	(Wales) Cardiff	s Kings Park
17:00

Sat, Apr 18	(Wales) Ospreys	v	(South Africa) Sharks	TBC
19:45

Fri, Apr 24	(Scotland) Edinburgh	v	(South Africa) Sharks	Hive Stadium
19:45

Sat, May 9	(South Africa) Sharks	v	(Italy) Benneton Treviso	s Kings Park
15:00

Sat, May 16	(South Africa) Sharks	v	(Italy) Zebre Parma	s Kings Park
12:45

== URC South African shield ==
2025–26 United Rugby Championship Regional Shield tables
(South Africa) South African Shield
	Team	P	W	D	L	PF	PA	PD	TF	TA	TBP	LBP	Pts	Pos overall
1	(South Africa) Lions (S)	6	4	0	2	168	173	–5	21	25	2	1	19	5
2	(South Africa) Sharks	6	3	0	3	143	153	–10	21	19	3	1	16	10
3	(South Africa) Stormers	6	3	0	3	132	144	–12	16	19	2	0	14	2
4	(South Africa) Bulls	6	2	0	4	165	138	+27	24	19	3	1	12	8
If teams are level at any stage, tiebreakers are applied in the following order: 1. number of matches won 2. the difference between points for and points against 3. the number of tries scored 4. the most points scored 5. the difference between tries for and tries against 6. the fewest red cards received 7. the fewest yellow cards received
Green background indicates teams currently leading the regional shield. Upon the conclusion of the regular season, these teams win their respective regional shields. (S) : URC Shield champion

== European Rugby Champions Cup ==
European Rugby Champions Cup Pool 1
Pos	Team	Pld	W	D	L	PF	PA	PD	TF	TA	TB	LB	Pts	Qualification
1	(Scotland) Glasgow Warriors (2)	4	4	0	0	115	66	+49	17	9	4	0	20	Home Champions Cup round of 16.
2	(France) Toulouse (8)	4	2	0	2	168	74	+94	24	11	2	2	12	Home Champions Cup round of 16.
3	(England) Sale Sharks (11)	4	2	0	2	89	127	−38	13	18	2	1	11	Away Champions Cup round of 16.
4	(England) Saracens (13)	4	2	0	2	93	70	+23	13	14	1	1	10	Away Champions Cup round of 16.
5	(South Africa) Sharks (9CC)	4	2	0	2	107	117	−10	16	17	2	0	10	Away Challenge Cup round of 16.
6	(France) Clermont	4	0	0	4	57	165	−108	9	25	0	0	0	

Source: EPCR
Rules for classification: Tiebreakers for teams tied on points: 1) Number of matches won; 2) Difference between points for and against; 3) Total number of points for; 4) Aggregate number of points scored in matches between tied teams; 5) Number of matches won excluding the first match, then the second and so on until the tie is settled.

7 December 2025	(1 BP) Toulouse (France)	56–19	(South Africa) Sharks	Stade Ernest-Wallon, Toulouse
16:15	Try: Capuozzo (3) 4' c, 63' c, 71' c Marchand (2) 14' c, 21' c Gourgues 24' c Castro-Ferreira (67' c); Thomas 80' c Con: Ramos (8/8) 5', 15', 22', 25', 64', 68', 72', 82'	Report	Try: Hatton 26' m Braude 49' c Malan 77' c Con: Hendrikse (1/2) 50'; J. Smith (1/1) 78'	Attendance: 18,800; Referee: Christophe Ridley (England)

13 December 2025	(1 BP) Sharks (South Africa)	28–23	(England) Saracens (1 BP)	Hollywoodbets Kings Park, Durban
16:15	Try: Kolisi 4' c Fassi 37' c van der Merwe 43' c Williams 59' c Con: Whitehead (4/4) 5', 38', 44', 60'; Cards: Hatton (yellow card) 80+2'	Report	Try: Dan 15' m Spink 26' c Willis 65' m Con: Burke (1/3) 27'; Pen: Burke (2/2) 32', 55'; Cards: Dan (yellow card) 58'	Attendance: 10,506; Referee: Luc Ramos (France)

10 January 2026	(1 BP) Sale Sharks (England)	26–10	(South Africa) Sharks	Salford Community Stadium, Manchester
17:30	Try: Ma'asi-White 12' c Rodd 49' c O'Flaherty (2) 55' m, 61' c Con: Ford (3/4) 12', 50', 62'	Report	Try: Tshituka 59' c Con: Masuku (1/1) 60'; Pen: Masuku (1/2) 8'	Attendance: 7,349; Referee: Ben Breakspear (Wales)

17 January 2026	(1 BP) Sharks (South Africa)	50–12	(France) Clermont	Hollywoodbets Kings Park, Durban
14:00	Try: Fassi (2) 1' c, 64' c JA. Hendrikse 16' c Koch 44' c Sobahle 49' c Masuku 72' m Buthelezi 79' m Julius 80' m Con: JO. Hendrikse (4/4) 2', 17', 45', 50'; Masuku (1/4) 64'	Report	Try: Jurand 11' m Hamdaoui 32' c Con: Zamora (1/2) 33'; Cards: Fall (red card) 7'; Frisach (yellow card) 44'; Zamora (yellow card) 62'	Attendance: 8,292; Referee: Christophe Ridley (England)

=== EPRC Challenge Cup ===
Knockout stage

Round of 16

Sharks were defeated by Connacht at the Dexcom Stadium in the round of 16, eliminating them from the EPRC Challenge Cup.

3 April 2026	Connacht (Ireland) (8)	29 – 12	(9) (South Africa) Sharks	Dexcom Stadium, Galway
20:00	Try: Mullins 22' c Forde (2) 46' c, 62' c Hurley-Langton 54' m Con: Gilbert (3/4) 23', 47', 63'; Pen: Gilbert (1/1) 69'	Report	Pen: Smith (4/5) 6', 20', 31', 33'	Attendance: 6,197; Referee: Sam Grove-White (Scotland)
