= 2024 Currie Cup Premier Division =

Domestic rugby union competition

- Countries: South Africa
- Date: 5 July – 21 September
- Champions: Sharks

The 2024 Currie Cup Premier Division is the 86th edition of the Currie Cup, the premier domestic rugby union competition in South Africa, and the oldest provincial rugby competition in the world. The competition was sponsored by beer brand Carling Black Label and organised by the South African Rugby Union.

The tournament was played from 5 July until 21 September 2024, and featured a league stage of one-and-a-half rounds, followed by two semi-finals and a final. After the 2023 event was played from March until June, the dates for the 2024 season were in contention until shortly before the start, taking into account alignment with the northern hemisphere season, player welfare, and a 12-month season.

The competition featured the same eight teams from the previous season.

== Teams ==
Team locations in the 2024 Currie Cup Premier Division

The eight competing teams were:

2024 Currie Cup Premier Division
Team	Sponsored name	Stadium	Capacity
Blue Bulls	Vodacom Blue Bulls	Loftus Versfeld, Pretoria	51,762
Free State Cheetahs	Toyota Free State Cheetahs	Free State Stadium, Bloemfontein	48,000
Golden Lions	Fidelity ADT Lions	Ellis Park Stadium, Johannesburg; Wits Rugby Stadium, Johannesburg	62,567; 5,000
Griffons	Novavit Griffons	North West Stadium, Welkom	17,000
Griquas	Suzuki Griquas	Griqua Park, Kimberley	11,000
Pumas	Airlink Pumas	Mbombela Stadium, Mbombela	40,929
Sharks	Hollywoodbets Sharks	Kings Park Stadium, Durban	54,000
Western Province	DHL Western Province	Cape Town Stadium, Cape Town; Danie Craven Stadium, Stellenbosch	55,000; 16,000

== Regular season ==
=== Standings ===
2024 Currie Cup Premier Division standings
Pos	Team	Pld	W	D	L	PF	PA	PD	TF	TA	B	Pts	Qualification
1	Golden Lions	10	9	0	1	437	215	+222	62	31	7	43	Semifinals
2	Blue Bulls	10	7	1	2	384	266	+118	54	37	8	38	Semifinals
3	Sharks	10	6	1	3	351	258	+93	48	35	9	35	Semifinals
4	Free State Cheetahs	10	5	1	4	352	281	+71	50	36	8	30	Semifinals
5	Griquas	10	4	0	6	310	356	−46	46	51	8	24	
6	Pumas	10	4	1	5	331	391	−60	46	57	6	24	
7	Western Province	10	3	0	7	311	314	−3	41	39	8	20	
8	Griffons	10	0	0	10	185	580	−395	27	88	3	3	

Updated to match(es) played on 4 Aug 2024.. Source: https://www.sarugby.co.za/tournaments/carling-currie-cup-premier-division/

Tournament points in the standings were awarded to teams as follows:

- 4 points for a win.
- 2 points for a draw.
- 1 bonus point for a loss in a match by seven points or under.
- 1 bonus point for scoring four tries or more.

Teams were ranked in the standings by tournament points. Had two or more teams tied on points the tie would have been broken by: (a) points difference from all matches (points scored less points conceded); (b) tries difference from all matches (tries scored less tries conceded); (c) points difference from the matches between the tied teams; (d) points scored in all matches; (e) tries scored in all matches; and, if needed, (f) a coin toss.

== Fixtures ==
=== Round 1 ===
5 July 2024	Griquas	24–44	Pumas	Griqua Park, Kimberley

5 July 2024	Sharks	25–26	Golden Lions	Kings Park Stadium, Durban

6 July 2024	Cheetahs	82–20	Griffons	Free State Stadium, Bloemfontein

7 July 2024	Western Province	25–30	Blue Bulls	Cape Town Stadium, Cape Town
	Try: du Plessis 14'; Porter 49'; Davids 77'; Simelane 80'; Con: du Plessis 83'; Pen: Mathee 56'	Report	Try: van Zyl 22'; Williams 60'; Gumede 62'; Con: van der Walt 23'; Smith (2) 61', 64'; Pen: van der Walt (3) 4', 34', 47'

=== Round 2 ===
12 July 2024	Griquas	34–31	Sharks	Griqua Park, Kimberley

12 July 2024	Pumas	21–75	Golden Lions	Mbombela Stadium, Mbombela

13 July 2024	Cheetahs	37–17	Western Province	Free State Stadium, Bloemfontein

14 July 2024	Griffons	10–52	Blue Bulls	North West Stadium, Welkom
	Try: Qamani Kota; Matthew Gray; Cards: Thato Mavundla (yellow card) 29' to 39'	Report	Try: Aphiwe Dyantyi; Celimpilo Gumede (2); Williams; Bernard van der Linde; Chris Smit; Sintu Manjezi; Cornal Hendricks; Con: Jaco van der Walt (3); Chris Smith (3)

=== Round 3 ===
19 July 2024	Golden Lions	25–13	Griquas	Ellis Park Stadium, Johannesburg

19 July 2024	Blue Bulls	25–13	Cheetahs	Loftus Versfeld Stadium, Pretoria
	Try: Celimpilo Gumede; Henry Immelman (2); Con: Chris Smith (2); Pen: Chris Smith (2)	Report	Try: Daniel Maartens; Con: Ethan Wentzel; Pen: Ethan Wentzel (2); Cards: Daniel Maartens (yellow card) 65' to 75'

19 July 2024	Sharks	21–31	Pumas	Kings Park Stadium, Durban

21 July 2024	Griffons	15-64	Western Province	North West Stadium, Welkom

=== Round 4 ===
26 July 2024	Griffons	45–47	Cheetahs	North West Stadium, Welkom

27 July 2024	Golden Lions	22–35	Sharks	Ellis Park Stadium, Johannesburg

27 July 2024	Blue Bulls	50–34	Western Province	Loftus Versfeld Stadium, Pretoria
	Try: van der Walt (2) 38', 80'; Gumede 41'; Klopper 46'; Burger 52' van Zyl 55'; Else 70'; Con: van der Walt (6) 39', 42', 47', 53', 71', 81'; Pen: van der Walt 2'	Report	Try: Porter 21'; Simelane 26'; Khan 30'; Davids 61'; Con: Matthee (4) 22', 27', 31', 62'; Pen: Matthee 17'; Drop: Matthee 4'

28 July 2024	Pumas	66 – 26	Griquas	Mbombela Stadium, Mbombela
	Try: Slabbert (2) 4', 7'; Swart (2) 29', 59'; Sobahle 37'; Adonis (2) 45', 67'; Coetzee 56'; Msenge 78'; Con: Swart (9) 5', 8', 30', 38', 46', 57', 60', 68', 79'; Pen: Swart 50'		Try: Hufke 2'; Bursey 10'; Makata 53'; Mahoney 70'; Con: Robinson (3) 3', 11' ,54'

=== Round 5 ===
2 August 2024	Cheetahs	34–34	Blue Bulls	Free State Stadium, Bloemfontein
	Try: Olivier 51'; Jasper 53'; Hartzenberg 57'; Wegner 64'; Paulo 75'; Con: Wentzel (2) 52', 58'; Fortuin 76'; Pen: Wentzel 35'	Report	Try: Carr 6'; Burger 43'; Dyantyi (2) 45' 70'; Con: van der Walt (2) 6', 44'; Chamberlain (2) 46', 71'; Pen: van der Walt 32'; Chamberlain 79'

3 August 2024	Pumas	44–44	Sharks	Mbombela Stadium, Mbombela
		Report

3 August 2024	Western Province	38–17	Griffons
		Report

4 August 2024	Griquas	28–36	Golden Lions	Griqua Park, Kimberley
		Report

=== Round 6 ===
10 August 2024	Lions	55–12	Pumas	Ellis Park Stadium, Johannesburg
		Report

10 August 2024	Blue Bulls	55–21	Griffons	Loftus Versfeld, Pretoria
	Try: Sibongile Novuka (2); Cornal Hendricks; Canan Moodie; Juann Els; Zak Burger; Lionel Mapoe; Keagan Johannes; Nama Xaba; Con: Boeta Chamberlain (3); Jaco van der Walt (2)	Report	Try: Keanu Vers; Cheslin Arendse; Curtly Thomas; Con: Qamani Kota (3)

10 August 2024	Western Province	19–26	Cheetahs	Cape Town Stadium, Cape Town
		Report

11 August 2024	Sharks	40–21	Griquas	Kings Park Stadium, Durban
		Report

=== Round 7 ===
16 August 2024	Pumas	24–40	Blue Bulls	Mbombela Stadium, Mbombela
	Try: Eduan Swart 40+1'; Darren Adonis 42'; Clinton Swart 47'; Tino Swanepoel 49'; Con: Clinton Swart (2) 43', 50'	Report	Try: Cornel Smit 6'; Sibongile Novuka 13'; Joe van Zyl (2) 17', 24'; Devon Williams 53'; Chris Smit 65'; Con: Keagan Johannes (4) 7', 18', 25' 54'; Jaco van der Walt 66'; Cards: Cornel Smit (yellow card) 34' to 44'

17 August 2024	Lions	41–22	Western Province	Ellis Park Stadium, Johannesburg

17 August 2024	Cheetahs	20–25	Sharks	Free State Stadium, Bloemfontein

18 August 2024	Griffons	7–59	Griquas	North West Stadium, Welkom

=== Round 8 ===
23 August 2024	Blue Bulls	47-24	Griquas	Loftus Versfeld, Pretoria
	Try: Jaco van der Walt 20'; Chris Smit 23'; Henry Immelman 27'; Celimpilo Gumede (2) 36', 43'; Juann Else (2) 60', 73'; Con: Jaco van der Walt (4) 21', 24', 37', 44'; Boeta Chamberlain (2) 61', 74'; Cards: Merwe Olivier (yellow card) 81' to -'	Report	Try: Marco de Witt 1'; Dylan Maart (2) 15' 69'; Thabo Ndimande 40+3'; Con: Zinedine Robinson (2) 2', 16'

24 August 2024	Western Province	23 - 31	Sharks	Cape Town Stadium, Cape Town

24 August 2024	Cheetahs	21 - 38	Lions	Free State Stadium, Bloemfontein

25 August 2024	Griffons	26 - 45	Pumas	North West Stadium, Welkom

=== Round 9 ===
30 August 2024	Griquas	44-31	Cheetahs	Griqua Park, Kimberley
		Report

30 August 2024	Blue Bulls	33-57	Lions	Midstream College, Olifantsfontein
	Try: Corné Beets; Joe van Zyl; Katlego Letebele; Juann Else; Penalty try Con: Jaco van der Walt; Keagan Johannes (2)	Report	Try: Erich Cronje; Ruan Venter; Morne van den Berg; Morgan Naudé; Renzo du Plessis; Rabz Maxwane; PJ Botha (2); Con: Nico Steyn (5); Sanele Nohamba (2); Drop: Nico Steyn

31 August 2024	Sharks	75-19	Griffons	Kings Park Stadium, Durban

01 September 2024	Western Province	39-30	Pumas	Cape Town Stadium, Cape Town

=== Round 10 ===
06 September 2024	Griquas	37-29	Western Province	Griqua Park, Kimberley

06 September 2024	Lions	62–5	Griffons	Ellis Park Stadium, Johannesburg

07 September 2024	Pumas	14–41	Cheetahs	Mbombela Stadium, Mbombela

08 September 2024	Sharks	24–18	Blue Bulls	Kings Park Stadium, Durban
	Try: Jordan Hendrikse; Dylan Richardson; Con: Siya Masuku; Pen: Siya Masuku (4)	Report	Try: Akker van der Merwe; Embrose Papier; Con: Jaco van der Walt; Pen: Jaco van der Walt (2); Cards: David Kriel (yellow card) 30' to 40'; Harold Vorster (yellow card) 31' to 41'

== Play-offs ==
=== Semifinals ===
14 September 2024	Lions	43–34	Cheetahs	Ellis Park Stadium
14:30

The semi-final was tied 33-33 after 80 minutes of play and it ended 40 all after extra time (100 minutes) and the Sharks were deemed winners due to scoring more tries in the match, 6 tries to Bulls' 4.

14 September 2024	Blue Bulls	40–40 (a.e.t.)	Sharks	Loftus Versfeld Stadium
17:00	Try: Keagan Johannes; Cameron Hanekom; Stavino Jacobs (2); Con: Johan Goosen (3); Boeta Chamberlain; Pen: Johan Goosen (4); Cards: Marcell Coetzee (yellow card) 48' to 58'	Report	Try: Emile van Heerden; Bradley Davids; Ethan Hooker (2); Andre Esterhuizen; Trevor Nyakane; Con: Siya Masuku (4); Lionel Cronje; Cards: Dian Bleuler (yellow card) 68' to 78'; Jordan Hendrikse (yellow card) 73' to 80'; Gerbrandt Grobler (yellow card) 100' to 110'; Francois Venter (red card) 65'

=== Final ===
21 September 2024	Lions	14–16	Sharks	Ellis Park Stadium
16:00	Try: Nico Steyn 57'; Sibabalo Qoma 77'; Con: Sanele Nohamba (2) 58', 78'; Cards: Juan Schoeman (yellow card) 70' to 80'		Try: Ethan Hooker 53'; Con: Siya Masuku 54'; Pen: Siya Masuku 65'; Jordan Hendrikse (2) 70' 80+2'; Cards: Eduan Keyter (yellow card) 15' to 25'	Attendance: 30 000

The game was a tight one being played in adverse and cold weather conditions in front of an expected 30 000 fans (The final attendance was never confirmed). As a result the game was scoreless in the first half with the first points being a try scored by Sharks winger Ethan Hooker which was duly converted by Siya Masuku. The Lions did not take long to respond with scrumhalf Nico Steyn crossing a couple minutes later leaving the scores tied at 7 apiece going into the final 20 minutes. 2 Penalties by Masuku and Sharks Fullback Jordan Hendrikse handed the visitors a 13-7 lead going into the final 5 minutes before a late try by Lions flanker Sibabalo Quma (and subsequent conversion by Sanele Nohamba) appeared to have won the Lions the game. This seemed to have been confirmed when the Lions won a penalty with a few seconds to go however the Sharks disrupted the resulting maul and managed the turnover leading to the Sharks launching one last attack from their 22. They then won a penalty 60m out which Hendrikse (who had moved to the Sharks from the Lions earlier in the year) coolly converted handing the Sharks the title.

== See also ==
- 2024 Currie Cup First Division
- SA Cup
