= Juann Else =

South African rugby union player (born 2003)

- Full name: Juann Jacques Else
- Born: 22 May 2003 (age 23) Pretoria, South Africa
- Height: 182 cm (6 ft 0 in)
- Weight: 105 kg (231 lb; 16 st 7 lb)
- School: Grey College, Bloemfontein

Rugby union career
- Position: Hooker
- Current team: Bulls / Blue Bulls
Senior career
Years	Team	Apps	(Points)
2024–	Blue Bulls		
2025–	Bulls	6	(5)
- Correct as of 30 November 2025
International career
Years	Team	Apps	(Points)
2022–2023	South Africa U20	8	(15)
- Correct as of 30 November 2025

Juann Else (born 22 May 2003) is a South African rugby union player, who plays for the Bulls and Blue Bulls. His preferred position is hooker.

== Early career ==
Else attended Grey College, Bloemfontein where he played rugby for the first XV, originally as a prop before converting to hooker. He represented South Africa U20 in both 2022 and 2023.

== Professional career ==
Else represented the Bulls in junior rugby, representing their U19 side in the U19 cup in 2022, and U21 side in 2023. He made his Currie Cup debut for the Blue Bulls in the 2024 Currie Cup Premier Division, before representing the side again in the 2025 edition. He made his Bulls debut in the 2024–25 United Rugby Championship against Glasgow Warriors.
