= 2024 Currie Cup First Division =

Domestic rugby union competition

- Countries: South Africa
- Date: – 24 June
- Champions: Boland Cavaliers (7th title)
- Runners-up: Eastern Province Elephants

The 2024 Currie Cup First Division was the 86th edition of the Currie Cup. As the second-tier of the competition, it ran alongside the 2024 Currie Cup Premier Division. It was sponsored by beer brand Carling Black Label and organised by the South African Rugby Union.

It was won by the Boland Cavaliers, who drew in the final, winning on tiebreak due to the number of tries scored.

== Teams ==
Location of teams in the 2024 Currie Cup First Division - not including the international Mzansi Challenge participants

The six competing teams were:

2024 Currie Cup First Division
Team	Sponsored name
Boland Cavaliers	Sanlam Boland Kavaliers
Border Bulldogs	Border Bulldogs
Eastern Province Elephants	Eastern Province
Leopards	Leopards
SWD Eagles	Phangela SWD Eagles
Valke	Valke

=== Standings ===
2024 Currie Cup First Division standings
Pos	Team	Pld	W	D	L	PF	PA	PD	TF	TA	TB	LB	Pts	Qualification
1	Boland Cavaliers	5	5	0	0	267	91	+176	40	13	0	0	25	Semi-Final
2	Eastern Province Elephants	5	3	0	2	203	157	+46	31	23	0	0	18	Semi-Final
3	Valke	5	3	0	2	202	168	+34	34	34	0	0	17	Semi-Final
4	SWD Eagles	5	2	0	3	148	169	−21	22	25	0	0	12	Semi-Final
5	Leopards	5	2	0	3	132	211	−79	19	32	0	0	12	
6	Border Bulldogs	5	0	0	5	102	258	−156	15	40	0	0	3	

Source: springboks.rugby
Rules for classification: Tournament points in the standings were awarded to teams as follows:
- 4 points for a win.
- 2 points for a draw.
- 1 bonus point for a loss in a match by seven points or under.
- 1 bonus point for scoring four tries or more.
Teams were ranked in the standings firstly by tournament points then by: (a) points difference from all matches (points scored less points conceded); (b) tries difference from all matches (tries scored less tries conceded); (c) points difference from the matches between the tied teams; (d) points scored in all matches; (e) tries scored in all matches; and, if needed, (f) a coin toss.

=== Matches ===
Listed below are all matches for the round-robin, played for the 2024 Currie Cup First Division.

==== Round 1 ====
15 June 2024	SWD Eagles	19–34	Eastern Province Elephants	Outeniqua Park, George
14:00		Report

15 June 2024	Border Bulldogs	24–26	Leopards	Police Park, East London
15:00		Report

15 June 2024	Valke	32–46	Boland Cavaliers	Barnard Stadium, Kempton Park
15:00		Report

==== Round 2 ====
22 June 2024	Leopards	35–45	Valke	Olen Park, Potchefstroom
15:00		Report

22 June 2024	Eastern Province	31–48	Boland Cavaliers	Wolfson Stadium, Gqeberha
15:00		Report

22 June 2024	SWD Eagles	45–26	Border Bulldogs	Outeniqua Park, George
15:00		Report

==== Round 3 ====
29 June 2024	Boland Cavaliers	43–7	SWD Eagles	Rooikamp Sportsgound, Ceres
15:00		Report

29 June 2024	Eastern Province	26–31	Leopards	Central Rugby Field, Kariega
15:00		Report

29 June 2024	Valke	59–12	Border Bulldogs	Barnard Stadium, Kempton Park
15:00		Report

==== Round 4 ====
5 July 2024	Border Bulldogs	26–69	Eastern Province	Mthatha Stadium, Umtata
15:00		Report

5 July 2024	SWD Eagles	32–33	Valke	Outeniqua Park, George
15:00		Report

6 July 2024	Boland Cavaliers	71–7	Leopards	Boland Stadium, Wellington
15:00		Report

==== Round 5 ====
13 July 2024	Border Bulldogs	14–59	Boland Cavaliers	Police Park, East London
13:30		Report

13 July 2024	Valke	33–43	Eastern Province	Barnard Stadium, Kempton Park
15:00		Report

13 July 2024	Leopards	33–45	SWD Eagles	Olen Park, Potchefstroom
15:00		Report

=== Semi-final ===
20 July 2024	Eastern Province	31–27	Valke	Central Rugby Field, Kariega
		Report

20 July 2024	Boland Cavaliers	25–24	SWD Eagles	Boland Stadium, Wellington
		Report

=== Final ===
The final was tied 20-20 after 80 minutes of play and it ended 27 all after extra time and Boland Cavaliers were deemed champions due to scoring more tries in the final, 5 tries to Eastern Province's 4.

27 July 2024	Boland Cavaliers	27–27	Eastern Province	Boland Stadium, Wellington
	Try: Neil Rautenbach (2), Dayan van der Westhuizen, Cornell Engelbrecht, Taine-Randall Booysen; Con: Ashlon Davids	Report	Try: Temba Boltina, Lungi Mbiko (2), Wayne Ngubane; Con: Jayden Bantom (2); Pen: Jayden Bantom	Referee: Paul Mente

Boland Cavaliers:

15 Domenic Smit, 14 Duren Hoffman, 13 Xavier Mitchell, 12 Erik Lambrecht, 11 Cornell Engelbrecht, 10 Ashlon Davids, 9 Chriswill September, 8 Thurlow Marsh (captain), 7 Peter-John Smit, 6 Sauliegh Arendse, 5 Marlyn Williams, 4 Michael Benadie, 3 Dayan van der Westhuizen, 2 Neil Rautenbach, 1 Andrew Beerwinkel

Substitutes:

16 Emile Booysen, 17 Gerrit Bester, 18 Doctor Booysen, 19 Ameer Hendricks, 20 Gift Dlamini, 21 Taine-Randell Booysen, 22 Bentley Geldenhuys, 23 Darian Hock

Eastern Province:

15 Jayden Bantom, 14 Sporo Damons, 13 Sherwin Slater, 12 Troy Delport, 11 Jay-Dee Jooste, 10 Mbembe Xolela Payi, 9 Shirwin Cupido, 8 Athenkosi Manentsa, 7 Gerrit Huisamen, 6 Laken Gray, 5 Lungi Mbiko, 4 Stefan Willemse (captain), 3 Duncan du Buisson, 2 Tembekile Boltina, 1 Siya Nzuzo

Substitutes:

16 Deon Plaatjies, 17 Zukisa Denzel Sali, 18 Andile Ngonyama, 19 Lubabalo Mtyanda, 20 Ayabonga Nomboyo, 21 Wayne Ngubane, 22 Darryle Kameel, 23 Davian Swanepoel

== See also ==
- 2024 Currie Cup Premier Division
- SA Cup
