= Jannes Potgieter =

South African rugby union player

- Born: 5 May 2003 (age 23) Johannesburg, South Africa
- Height: 193 cm (6 ft 4 in)
- Weight: 112 kg (247 lb; 17 st 9 lb)
- School: Hilton College

Rugby union career
- Position: Lock / Flanker
- Current team: Sharks / Sharks (Currie Cup)
Senior career
Years	Team	Apps	(Points)
2024–	Sharks (Currie Cup)		
2025–	Sharks	5	(0)
- Correct as of 21 March 2026
International career
Years	Team	Apps	(Points)
2023	South Africa U20	4	(0)
- Correct as of 21 March 2026

Jannes Potgieter (born 5 May 2003) is a South African rugby union player, who plays for the Sharks and Sharks (Currie Cup). His preferred position is lock or flanker.

== Early career ==
Potgieter was born in Johannesburg and underwent his early schooling in the area, before moving to attend Hilton College, where he was head of Lucas house and earned selection for South Africa at U16 level in 2019. After school Potgieter joined up with the Sharks academy, missing out on Craven Week due to the COVID-19 pandemic. He though helped the U20 side win the U20 Championship in 2023, and the following season captained their U21 side. He earned selection for the South Africa U20 side in 2023.

== Professional career ==
Potgieter joined up with the Sharks ahead of the 2024 Currie Cup Premier Division, making his Currie Cup debut that year. He would also feature for the Sharks in the 2025 edition. He would debut for the full Sharks side in the 2024–25 United Rugby Championship, coming on as a replacement against the Bulls in Round 11, before earning his first start against Lyon in the 2024–25 EPCR Challenge Cup.
