= Phatu Ganyane =

South African rugby union player

- Born: 17 January 2003 (age 23) South Africa
- Height: 185 cm (6 ft 1 in)
- Weight: 123 kg (271 lb; 19 st 5 lb)
- School: Glenwood High School

Rugby union career
- Position: Prop
- Current team: Sharks / Sharks (Currie Cup)
Senior career
Years	Team	Apps	(Points)
2024–	Sharks (Currie Cup)		
2024–	Sharks	5	(0)
- Correct as of 3 January 2026
International career
Years	Team	Apps	(Points)
2023	South Africa U20	5	(0)
- Correct as of 3 January 2026

Phatu Ganyane (born 17 January 2003) is a South African rugby union player, who plays for the Sharks and Sharks (Currie Cup). His preferred position is prop.

== Early career ==
Ganyane is South African-born and attended Glenwood High School in Durban, where he was a deputy head prefect. He has been a member of the Sharks academy since leaving school, representing their U18 side at Craven Week, and U21 side in 2024. In 2020, he was named in the South Africa U18 development squad, and in 2023 he represented the South Africa U20 side.

== Professional career ==
Ganyane joined up with the Sharks ahead of the 2024 Currie Cup Premier Division, making his Currie Cup debut that year. He would also feature for the Sharks in the 2025 edition. He would debut for the full Sharks side in the 2024–25 EPCR Challenge Cup, featuring in the match against Leicester Tigers.
