= Mawande Mdanda =

South African rugby union player

- Born: 9 March 2003 (age 23) Stanger, South Africa
- Height: 189 cm (6 ft 2 in)
- Weight: 132 kg (291 lb; 20 st 11 lb)
- School: Maritzburg College

Rugby union career
- Position: Prop
- Current team: Sharks / Sharks (Currie Cup)
Senior career
Years	Team	Apps	(Points)
2024–	Sharks (Currie Cup)		
2025–	Sharks	5	(0)
- Correct as of 13 December 2025
International career
Years	Team	Apps	(Points)
2023	South Africa U20	3	(0)
- Correct as of 13 December 2025

Mawande Mdanda (born 9 March 2003) is a South African rugby union player, who plays for the Sharks and Sharks (Currie Cup). His preferred position is prop.

== Early career ==
Mdanda is from Stanger and began playing rugby aged 10. He attended Maritzburg College where he played rugby for the first XV. After leaving school, he joined up with the Bulls academy, representing their U21 side in 2023. He represented the South Africa U20 side in 2023.

== Professional career ==
Mdanda joined up with the Sharks ahead of the 2024 Currie Cup Premier Division, making his Currie Cup debut that year. He would also feature for the Sharks in the 2025 edition. He would debut for the full Sharks side in the 2024–25 EPCR Challenge Cup, featuring in the match against Lyon.
