= Nick Hatton =

South African rugby union player

- Full name: Nick Hatton
- Born: 17 January 2003 (age 23) South Africa
- Height: 1.91 m (6 ft 3 in)
- Weight: 103 kg (227 lb)
- School: Hilton College

Rugby union career
- Position: Flanker / Number 8
- Current team: Sharks (Currie Cup)
Senior career
Years	Team	Apps	(Points)
2022–	Sharks (Currie Cup)	2	(0)
- Correct as of 23 June 2022

Nick Hatton (born 17 January 2003) is a South African rugby union player for the Sharks in the Currie Cup. His regular position is flanker or number eight.

Hatton was a mid-season addition to the Sharks side for the 2022 Currie Cup Premier Division. He made his Currie Cup debut for the Sharks against the Free State Cheetahs in Round 11 of the 2022 Currie Cup Premier Division.

Hatton made his United Rugby Championship debut on 19 April 2024, starting against Glasgow Warriors.

He attended Hilton College, where he captained their First XV rugby side. Additionally, he served as the school's Head of School in 2021.

Hatton was named as captain for the Sharks during the 2024 Currie Cup Premier Division.

Hatton was recognised as the Sharks player of the season for the 2025 Currie Cup Premier Division.
