= Ntuthuko Mchunu =

South African rugby union player

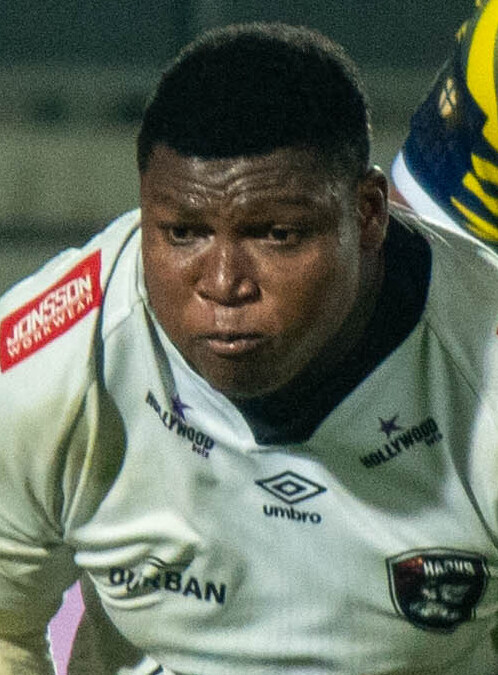
- Full name: Ntuthuko Mchunu
- Born: 5 April 1999 (age 27) Pietermaritzburg, South Africa
- Height: 1.88 m (6 ft 2 in)
- Weight: 123 kg (271 lb)
- School: Maritzburg College
- Notable relative: Khutha Mchunu (brother)

Rugby union career
- Position: Prop
- Current team: Stormers
Senior career
Years	Team	Apps	(Points)
2021–2025	Sharks	92	(20)
2021–2025	Sharks (Currie Cup)	8	(0)
2025–	Stormers	15	
- Correct as of 12 May 2026
International career
Years	Team	Apps	(Points)
2022–	South Africa	3	(0)
2022–	South Africa 'A'	2	(5)
- Correct as of 12 May 2026

Ntuthuko Mchunu (born 5 April 1999) is a South African rugby union player for the Stormers in the United Rugby Championship. He also currently plays for the South Africa national rugby union team.His regular position is prop.

Mchunu attended high school at Maritzburg College in Pietermaritzburg, where he was Head Boy in his Matric year of 2018. Mchunu was named in the Sharks squad for the Pro14 Rainbow Cup SA competition. Mchunu made his Sharks debut in Round 1 of the Pro14 Rainbow Cup SA competition against the Stormers.

In March 2025, his move to the Stormers was announced at the end of the season.

== Statistics ==
=== Test match record ===
As of 11 July 2026

Opponent	P	W	D	L	Try	Pts	%Won
Portugal	1	1	0	0	0	0	100
Scotland	1	1	0	0	0	0	100
Wales	2	1	0	1	0	0	50
Total	4	3	0	1	0	0	75
