= Tiaan Fourie =

South African rugby union player

- Full name: Tiaan Fourie
- Born: 22 April 2002 (age 24) South Africa
- Height

Rugby union career
- Position: Scrum-half
- Current team: Sharks (Currie Cup)
Senior career
Years	Team	Apps	(Points)
2021–2022	Blue Bulls	2	(0)
2023–	Sharks (Currie Cup)		
- Correct as of 23 July 2022

Tiaan Fourie (born 22 April 2002) is a South African rugby union player for the Blue Bulls in the Currie Cup. His regular position is scrum-half.

Fourie was named in the Blue Bulls squad for the 2021 Currie Cup Premier Division. He made his debut in Round 1 of the 2021 Currie Cup Premier Division against the Western Province.
