= Lee-Marvin Mazibuko =

South African rugby union player

- Full name: Lee-Marvin Lofty Siyanda Mazibuko
- Born: 12 October 1997 (age 29) South Africa
- Height: 1.79 m (5 ft 10 1/2 in)
- Weight: 102 kg (225 lb)
- School: Michaelhouse

Rugby union career
- Position: Prop
- Current team: Racing 92
Senior career
Years	Team	Apps	(Points)
2019	Western Province	4	(0)
2019–2020	Viadana	9	(0)
2020–2024	Western Province	15	(0)
2021–2024	Stormers	5	(0)
2024–2025	Racing 92	11	(5)
2026–	Sharks	8	(5)
- Correct as of 22 June 2026
International career
Years	Team	Apps	(Points)
2017	South Africa U20	2	(0)
- Correct as of 22 June 2026

Lee-Marvin Mazibuko (born 12 October 1997) is a South African rugby union player for Sharks. He previously played for Racing 92 in the Top 14. He has also played for the Western Province in the Currie Cup. His regular position is prop.

Mazibuko was named in the Western Province squad for the 2020 Currie Cup Premier Division match against the Pumas. He made his debut in the same match, starting the game as a late replacement for Frans Malherbe.
