= Diego Appollis =

South African rugby union player

- Full name: Diego Appollis
- Born: 27 August 2000 (age 26) Paarl, South Africa
- Height: 1.80 m (5 ft 11 in)
- Weight: 86 kg (13 st 8 lb; 190 lb)

Rugby union career
- Position: Centre
- Current team: Pumas
Senior career
Years	Team	Apps	(Points)
2019	Blue Bulls XV	6	(15)
2022–	Blue Bulls	1	(0)
2022–	Pumas	2	(0)
- Correct as of 10 July 2022

Diego Appollis (born 27 August 2000) is a South African rugby union player for the Blue Bulls in the Currie Cup. His regular position is centre.

Appollis was named in the Blue Bulls side for the 2022 Currie Cup Premier Division. He made his debut for the Blue Bulls in Round 11 of the 2022 Currie Cup Premier Division against the Golden Lions.
