= Corne Rahl =

South African rugby union player

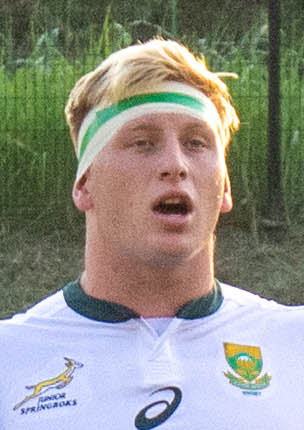
- Full name: Corne Rahl
- Born: 27 May 2002 (age 24) Montagu, South Africa
- Height: 2.03 m (6 ft 8 in)
- Weight: 122 kg (269 lb)
- School: Hoër Landbouskool Oakdale

Rugby union career
- Position: Lock
- Current team: Sharks / Sharks (Currie Cup)
Senior career
Years	Team	Apps	(Points)
2022–	Sharks (Currie Cup)	3	(0)
2023–	Sharks		
- Correct as of 23 July 2022

Corne Rahl (born 27 May 2002) is a South African rugby union player for the Sharks in the Currie Cup. His regular position is lock.

Rahl was named in the Sharks side for the 2022 Currie Cup Premier Division. He made his Currie Cup debut for the Sharks against the Pumas in Round 5 of the 2022 Currie Cup Premier Division.
