= Jeandre Labuschagne =

South African rugby union player

- Full name: Jeandre Labuschange
- Born: 17 July 1999 (age 27) Ladysmith, South Africa
- Height: 1.95 m (6 ft 5 in)
- Weight: 106 kg (16 st 10 lb; 234 lb)
- School: Maritzburg College

Rugby union career
- Position: Lock / Flanker
- Current team: Ricoh Black Rams
Senior career
Years	Team	Apps	(Points)
2019	Sharks XV	2	(0)
2021–2025	Sharks	46	(10)
2021–2025	Sharks (Currie Cup)	11	(0)
2025–2026	Yokohama Canon Eagles	9	(0)
2026–	Ricoh Black Rams		
- Correct as of 23 July 2022

Jeandre Labuschagne (born 17 July 1999) is a South African rugby union player who currently plays as a lock or flanker for the Yokohama Canon Eagles in Japan Rugby League One. He joined the Eagles during the 2024–25 season. He previously represented the Sharks in the United Rugby Championship, EPCR Champions Cup, EPCR Challenge cup and in the Currie Cup.

Labuschagne was named in the Sharks squad for the 2021 Currie Cup Premier Division. He made his debut for the Sharks against the British & Irish Lions on 10 July 2021 during the 2021 British & Irish Lions tour to South Africa.
