= Jaco Williams =

South African rugby union player

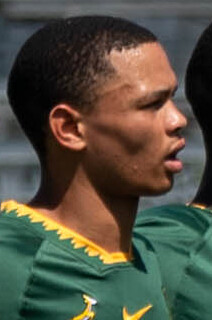
- Born: 25 August 2005 (age 21) Somerset East, South Africa
- Height: 175 cm (5 ft 9 in)
- Weight: 73 kg (161 lb; 11 st 7 lb)
- School: Glenwood High School

Rugby union career
- Position: Wing / Fullback
- Current team: Sharks / Sharks (Currie Cup)
Senior career
Years	Team	Apps	(Points)
2024–	Sharks (Currie Cup)		
2025–	Sharks	5	(15)
- Correct as of 1 March 2026
International career
Years	Team	Apps	(Points)
2025	South Africa U20	5	(20)
2026	South Africa 'A'	1	(5)
2026–	South Africa	1	(5)
- Correct as of 18 July 2026

Jaco Williams (born 25 August 2005) is a South African rugby union player, who plays for the Sharks and Sharks (Currie Cup). His preferred position is wing or fullback.

== Early career ==
Williams is from South Africa and attended Glenwood High School. His performances earned him selection for the Sharks side at Craven Week in 2023. He joined up with the Sharks academy in 2024, helping their U21 side win the U21 cup in 2025. In 2024, he earned selection for the South Africa U19 side, and then selection for the South Africa U20 side in 2025.

== Professional career ==
Williams joined up with the Sharks ahead of the 2024 Currie Cup Premier Division, making his Currie Cup debut that year. He would also feature for the Sharks in the 2025 edition. He would debut for the full Sharks side in the 2024–25 United Rugby Championship, featuring in the match against the Lions having been an unused replacement the week before. He would make his first start the following season, scoring against the Stormers.

In February 2026, Williams was named in the first alignment camp of 2026 for the South Africa national side.

Williams played for South Africa ‘A’ against Zimbabwe on 20 June 2026, and scored a try in the win.

Williams made his international debut on 18 July 2026 against Wales, once again scoring a try.
