= Braam Reyneke =

South African rugby union player

- Full name: Braam Reyneke
- Born: 14 June 2002 South Africa
- Died: May 29, 2025 (aged 22)
- Height: 1.83 m (6 ft 0 in)
- Weight: 117 kg (258 lb)
- School: Paarl Boys' High School

Rugby union career
- Position: Prop
Senior career
Years	Team	Apps	(Points)
–	Sharks (Currie Cup)	12	(0)
- Correct as of July 2022

Braam Reyneke was a South African rugby union player for the Sharks in the Currie Cup. His regular position is prop.

== Career ==
Reyneke was named in the Sharks side for the 2022 Currie Cup Premier Division. He made his Currie Cup debut for the Sharks against the Blue Bulls in Round 6 of the 2022 Currie Cup Premier Division.

== Death ==
Reyneke died on 29 May 2025.
