= Mpilo Gumede =

South African rugby union player

- Full name: Celimpilo Gumede
- Born: 8 July 2000 (age 26) South Africa
- Height: 1.92 m (6 ft 3 1/2 in)
- Weight: 103 kg (227 lb)
- School: Durban High School

Rugby union career
- Position: Flanker
- Current team: Bulls / Bulls (Currie Cup)
Senior career
Years	Team	Apps	(Points)
2020–	Sharks	2	(0)
2020–	Sharks (Currie Cup)	14	(15)
- Correct as of 23 July 2022

Celimpilo "Mpilo" Gumede (born 8 July 2000) is a South African rugby union player for the Bulls in Super Rugby. His regular position is flanker.

Gumede was named in the Sharks squad for both the 2020 Super Rugby season and the subsequent Super Rugby Unlocked competition. Gumede made his Sharks debut in Round 1 of the Super Rugby Unlocked competition against the Lions.
