= Gerbrandt Grobler =

South African rugby union player (born 1992)

- Full name: Douw Gerbrandt Grobler
- Born: 6 February 1992 (age 34) Nelspruit, South Africa
- Height: 2.01 m (6 ft 7 in)
- Weight: 120 kg (19 st; 260 lb)
- School: Afrikaanse Hoër Seunskool, Pretoria
- University: Uni of Stellenbosch

Rugby union career
- Position: Lock
- Current team: Sharks / Sharks (Currie Cup)
Youth career
- 2010: Blue Bulls
- 2011–2012: Western Province
Senior career
Years	Team	Apps	(Points)
2012–2014	Western Province	17	(0)
2013	Stormers	5	(0)
2016–2017	Racing 92	20	(25)
2017–2018	Munster	11	(5)
2018–2020	Gloucester	35	(35)
2020–2021	Stade Français	14	(10)
2021–	Sharks (Currie Cup)	5	(0)
2021–	Sharks	26	(30)
- Correct as of 9 February 2023

Douw Gerbrandt Grobler (born 6 February 1992) is a South African rugby union player, who plays for Sharks (Currie Cup). His regular position is lock.

== Career ==
=== Youth ===
Grobler went to Afrikaanse Hoër Seunskool in Pretoria and represented the Blue Bulls at the 2010 Craven Week.

Grobler then moved to Cape Town to join Western Province. He played for the Western Province U19 team in the 2011 Under-19 Provincial Championship and for the Western Province U21 team in the 2012 and 2013 Under-21 Provincial Championships.

=== Western Province / Stormers ===
Grobler was included in the Western Province squad for the 2012 Vodacom Cup and made his debut in their 42–31 Quarter Final victory over the Free State XV.

Grobler made three more first class appearances for Western Province in the 2013 Vodacom Cup before being included on the bench for the Stormers' Super Rugby game against the Cheetahs. He remained unused for that match, but made his Super Rugby debut the following week, playing off the bench in a 22–15 victory over the Sharks in Cape Town. After another spell with the Vodacom Cup side, where he made a further four starts, he returned to the Super Rugby side to make his first start in the competition against the Reds and eventually making a total of five appearances in the competition.

Grobler made his Currie Cup debut in August 2013, starting in Western Province's 24–24 draw with the Blue Bulls in the opening round of the 2013 Currie Cup Premier Division season. He made a further six appearances as a reserve in the remainder of the tournament, but then suffered an ankle injury that ruled him out of the play-off stages, as well as the majority of the 2014 season.

Grobler made his return to the side in October 2014, starting their final regular season match against the Sharks. He also played off the bench in the final, helping Western Province win the title by beating the Golden Lions 19–16.

=== Racing 92 ===
After Grobler's serving his two-year ban, Grobler left South Africa to sign for top French club Racing 92 in the Top 14 for the 2016–17 season.

=== Munster ===
In July 2017, it was announced that Grobler had joined Irish Pro14 side Munster on a one-year contract. On 24 August 2017, Grobler made his non-competitive debut for Munster when he started alongside compatriot Jean Kleyn against Worcester Warriors in a pre-season friendly in Sixways Stadium. During the game, Grobler suffered an ankle injury which he subsequently had to undergo surgery for. He was ruled out until early 2018. Grobler finally made his competitive debut for Munster on 10 February 2018, coming off the bench in the provinces' 33–5 win against Zebre in the 2017–18 Pro14.

=== Gloucester ===
Grobler joined English Premiership side Gloucester ahead of the 2018–19 season.

=== Stade Français ===
Grobler returned to the Top 14 with Stade Français on a two-year contract ahead of the 2020–21 season.
