= Manu Tshituka =

South African rugby union player

- Full name: Emmanuel Tshituka
- Born: 16 June 2000 (age 26) Kinshasa, Democratic Republic of Congo
- Height: 1.96 m (6 ft 5 in)
- Weight: 106 kg (234 lb)
- Notable relative: Vincent Tshituka (brother)

Rugby union career
- Position: Flanker
- Current team: Sharks / Sharks (Currie Cup)
Senior career
Years	Team	Apps	(Points)
2021–2024	Lions	57	(65)
2021–2024	Golden Lions	16	(15)
2024–	Sharks		
2024–	Sharks (Currie Cup)		
International career
Years	Team	Apps	(Points)
2026	South Africa 'A'	1	(0)

Emmanuel Tshituka (born 16 June 2000) is a Congolese-born South African rugby union player for the Sharks in the United Rugby Championship. His regular position is flanker.

== Professional career ==
=== Lions ===
Tshituka was named in the Lions squad for the Pro14 Rainbow Cup SA competition. He made his debut for the Lions in Round 1 of the Pro14 Rainbow Cup SA against the Bulls.

=== Sharks ===
In February 2024, it was announced he would join the Sharks, and be reunited with his brother Vincent, once more. He made his debut alongside his brother in the opening round of the 2024-25 United Rugby Championship.
