= Tinotenda Mavesere =

Zimbabwean rugby union player (born 1998)

- Full name: Tinotenda Pandehuni Blithe Mavesere
- Born: 17 October 1998 (age 28) Kadoma, Zimbabwe
- Height: 189 cm (6 ft 2 in)
- Weight: 105 kg (231 lb; 16 st 7 lb)
- School: Churchill School
- University: University of the Western Cape

Rugby union career
- Position: Flanker
- Current team: Sharks / Sharks (Currie Cup)
Youth career
- Pitbulls RFC
Amateur team(s)
Years	Team	Apps	(Points)
2021–2022	UWC	9	(35)
Senior career
Years	Team	Apps	(Points)
2023–	Sharks (Currie Cup)	11	(25)
2023–	Sharks	14	(10)
- Correct as of 18 May 2025
International career
Years	Team	Apps	(Points)
2017-2018	Zimbabwe U20		
2018-2019	Zimbabwe Academy		
2019–	Zimbabwe	16	(15)
- Correct as of 4 July 2026

Tinotenda Blithe Mavesere (born 17 October 1998) is a Zimbabwean rugby union player, who plays for the Sharks in the United Rugby Championship and the Sharks in the Currie Cup. His preferred position is flanker.

== Early career ==
Mavesere attended Churchill School in Harare. He moved to South Africa and attended the University of the Western Cape, where his appearances for their rugby side earned him the attention of the Sharks.

== Professional career ==
In 2019 Mavesere made his debut for the Zimbabwean National team, going on to feature in all 6 matches of their winning Victoria Cup campaign, scoring a try in the final

Mavesere originally signed for the Sharks in 2021, however it wasn't until 2023 that he debuted for the Sharks Currie Cup side in the 2023 Currie Cup Premier Division, having suffered a knee ligament injury that ruled him out of both Sharks selection and selection for the Zimbabwe national side. He would go on to make 6 appearances in the competition, scoring one try, while remaining a part of the Sharks side for the 2023–24 United Rugby Championship.
