= Fez Mbatha =

South African rugby union player

- Full name: Fezokuhle Brian Zomakahle Mbatha
- Born: 2 August 1999 (age 27) Empangeni, South Africa
- Height: 1.81 m (5 ft 11 1/2 in)
- Weight: 107 kg (236 lb)
- School: Maritzburg College

Rugby union career
- Position: Hooker
- Current team: Sharks / Sharks (Currie Cup)
Youth career
- 2014–2020: Sharks
Senior career
Years	Team	Apps	(Points)
2019–	Sharks	45	(25)
2020–	Sharks (Currie Cup)	14	(25)
- Correct as of 18 February 2023
International career
Years	Team	Apps	(Points)
2019	South Africa Under-20	5	(10)
- Correct as of 13 July 2019

Fezokuhle Brian Zomakahle Mbatha (born 2 August 1999) is a South African rugby union player for the Sharks in Super Rugby and in the Currie Cup and the Sharks XV in the Rugby Challenge. His regular position is hooker.

Mbatha made his Super Rugby debut for the Sharks in March 2019, coming on as a replacement in their 37–14 defeat to the Bulls in Pretoria.
