= Deon Slabbert =

South African rugby union player

- Full name: Deon Slabbert
- Born: 4 May 2000 (age 26) South Africa
- Height: 2.00 m (6 ft 6 1/2 in)
- Weight: 117 kg (18 st 6 lb; 258 lb)

Rugby union career
- Position: Lock
- Current team: Sharks
Youth career
- Sharks: 2016 - 2018
Senior career
Years	Team	Apps	(Points)
2021	SWD Eagles	4	(5)
2022–	Pumas	6	(5)
- Correct as of 10 July 2022

Deon Slabbert (born 4 May 2000) is a South African rugby union player for the Sharks in the Currie Cup & URC. His regular position is lock.

Slabbert was named in the Pumas side for the 2022 Currie Cup Premier Division. He made his Currie Cup debut for the Pumas against the Western Province in Round 11 of the 2022 Currie Cup Premier Division.
