= Phepsi Buthelezi =

South African rugby union player

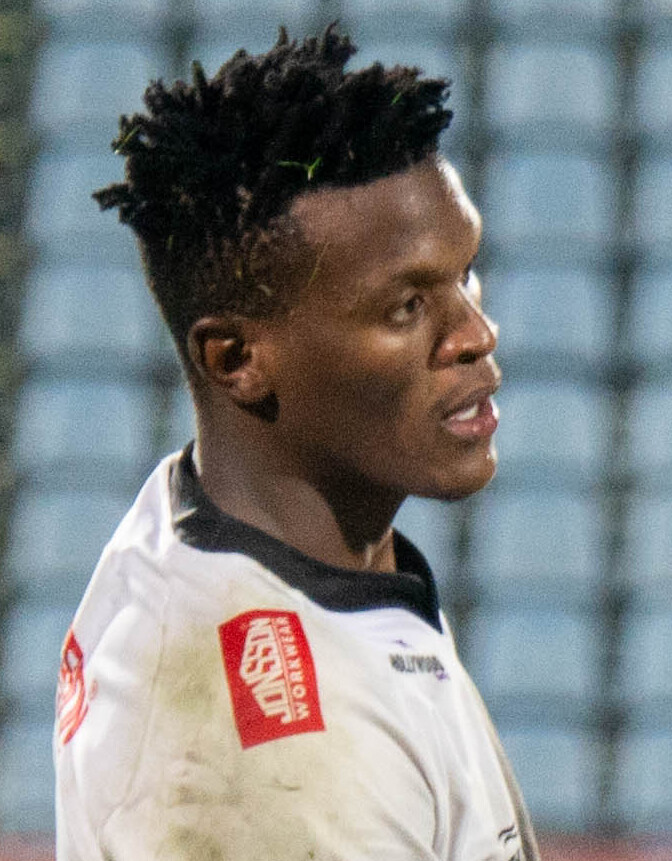
- Full name: Phendulani Sikhizane Hendrick Buthelezi
- Born: 30 May 1999 (age 27) Hluhluwe, South Africa
- Height: 188 cm (6 ft 2 in)
- Weight: 108 kg (238 lb)
- School: Durban High School

Rugby union career
- Position: Loose forward
- Current team: Sharks / Sharks (Currie Cup)
Youth career
- 2014–2020: Sharks
Senior career
Years	Team	Apps	(Points)
2019–	Sharks	99	(60)
2019–	Sharks (Currie Cup)	20	(20)
- Correct as of 9 March 2025
International career
Years	Team	Apps	(Points)
2017	South Africa Schools	2	(0)
2018	South Africa Under-20	7	(0)
2022	South Africa 'A'	2	(0)
2024–	South Africa	1	(5)
- Correct as of 1 September 2024

Phendulani Sikhizane Hendrick "Phepsi" Buthelezi (born 30 May 1999) is a South African rugby union player who plays for the Sharks in the United Rugby Championship the Sharks in the Currie Cup . He plays as a Loose forward.

== Club rugby ==
Buthelezi made his Super Rugby debut for the Sharks in February 2019, coming on as a replacement in their 45–10 victory over the Sunwolves in Singapore. Buthelezi was named as captain for the 2021 Currie Cup Premier Division.

During the 2025–26 United Rugby Championship, Buthelezi made his 100th appearance for the Sharks in international competitions.

In December 2025, Buthelezi signed an extension to keep him with the Sharks through 2029.

== International ==
Buthelezi represented South Africa at youth level, playing for the South Africa Schools team in the 2017 Under-19 International Series and for the South Africa Under-20 team at the 2018 World Rugby Under 20 Championship. Earned his first Springbok cap on 20 July 2024 v Portugal and scored a try.
