= Eduard Coetzee =

South African rugby union player

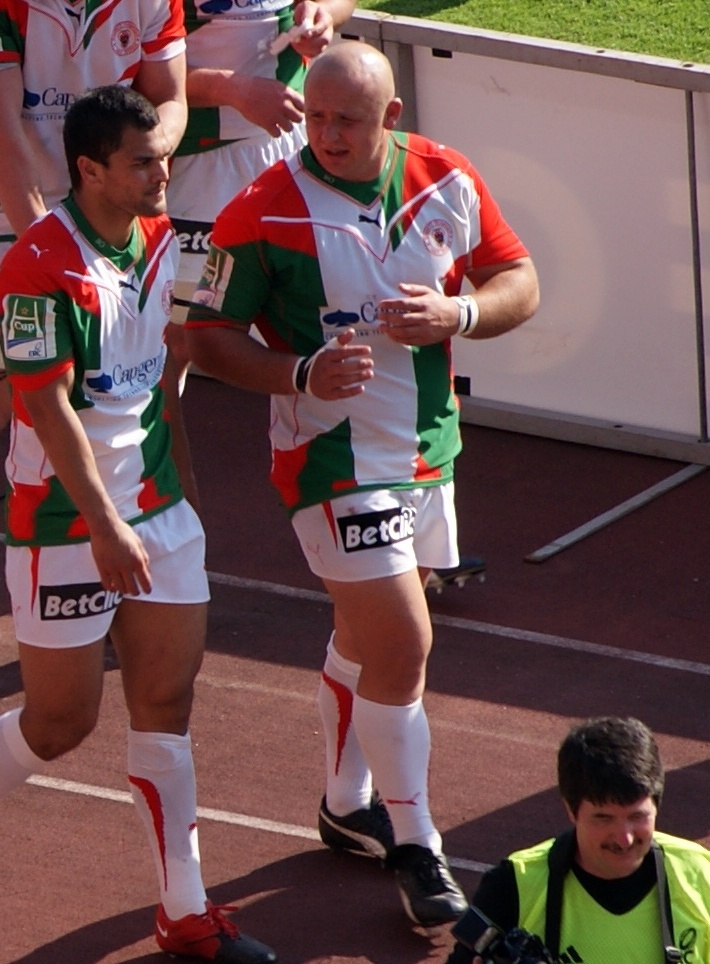
- Full name: Eduard Louis Coetzee
- Born: 8 September 1979 (age 47) Pretoria, South Africa
- Height: 5 ft 11 in (180 cm)
- Weight: 264 lb (120 kg)

Rugby union career
- Position: Prop
Senior career
Years	Team	Apps	(Points)
2005–07	Aviron Bayonnais		
2007–11	Biarritz Olympique		
Super Rugby
Years	Team	Apps	(Points)
2001–05	Sharks		

Eduard Louis Coetzee (born 8 September 1979) is a South African former professional rugby union player.

A Bulls under-age product, Coetzee was a prop and played in the Super 12 for the Sharks, until taking up a contract with French club Aviron Bayonnais in 2005. He crossed over to Biarritz in 2007 and was a member of the side that contested the 2010 Heineken Cup final. In 2011, Coetzee undertook a tour of Argentina with the French Barbarians. He announced his retirement at the end of 2011 on the advice of doctors, following a series of head knocks.

Coetzee took over from Gary Teichmann as CEO of the Sharks in 2019, having previously served as their COO.
