= Ethan Hooker =

South African rugby union player

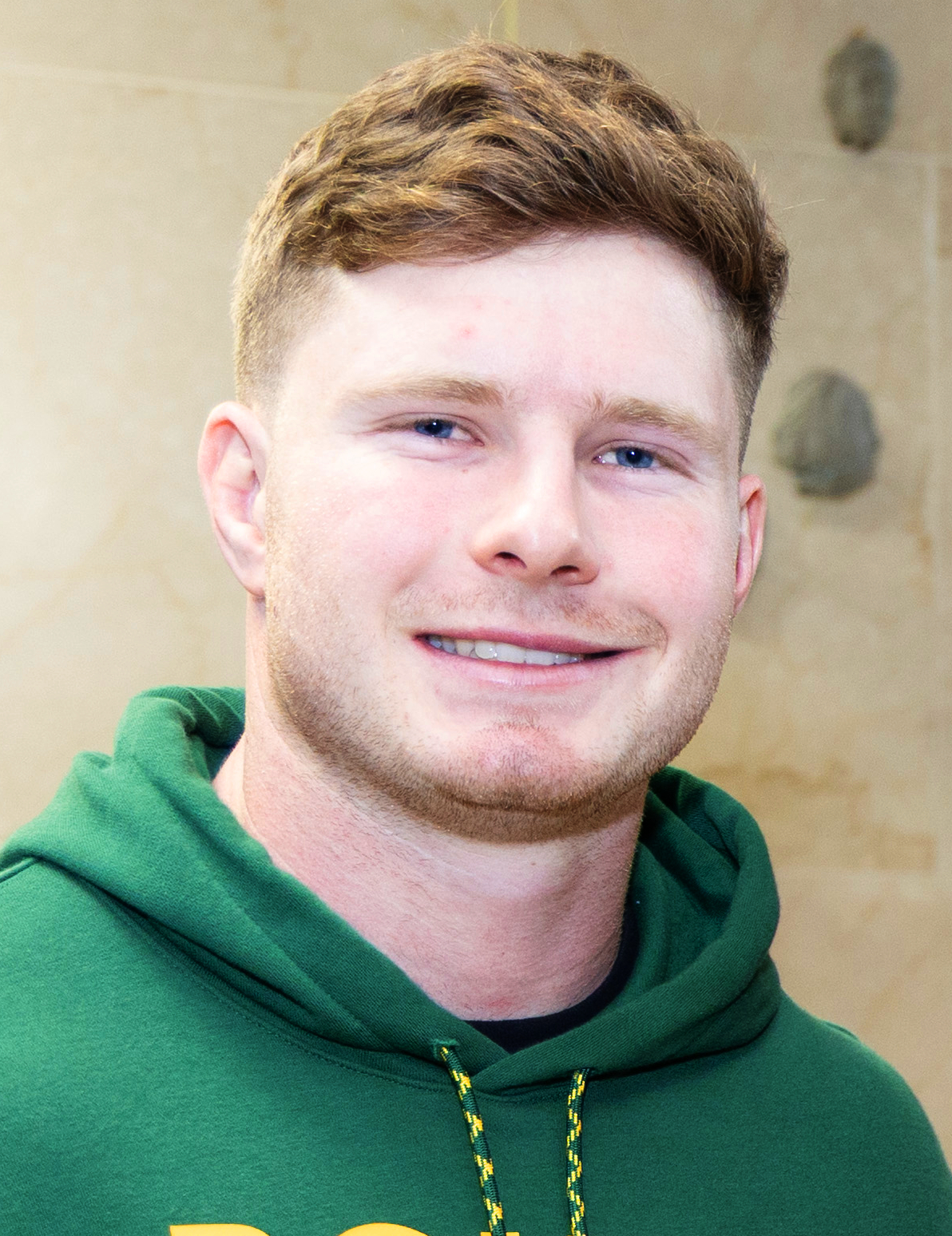
- Full name: Ethan Hooker
- Born: 20 January 2003 (age 23) Westville, South Africa
- Height: 1.94 m (6 ft 4 in)
- Weight: 98 kg (216 lb)
- School: Westville Boys' High School

Rugby union career
- Position: Centre, Wing
- Current team: Sharks
Senior career
Years	Team	Apps	(Points)
2023–	Sharks	50	(70)
2024–	Sharks (Currie Cup)	4	(10)
- Correct as of 31 October 2026
International career
Years	Team	Apps	(Points)
2023	South Africa Under-20	3	(5)
2025–	South Africa	14	(10)
- Correct as of 31 October 2026

Ethan Hooker (born 23 January 2003) is a South African professional rugby union player who plays as a centre or wing for the Sharks in the United Rugby Championship and for the South Africa national team.

== Early life ==
Hooker was born in Durban, South Africa, to Craig and Lorraine Hooker. He attended Westville Boys’ High School, where he initially played as a loose forward before transitioning into midfield back roles.

Despite his physical attributes, Hooker was not heavily recruited out of school. His coaches noted that although he trained consistently and showed strong temperament, he did not produce standout performances that typically attract professional offers, and no teams formally approached him in his matric year.

The Sharks initially invited him to join the squad on a training arrangement without offering a full contract. After a short period impressing in the system, he was upgraded to a professional deal, marking the start of his senior career.

== Club career ==
Hooker progressed through the Sharks’ junior structures and featured for the team at age-group level during the 2022 season.

He made his senior debut for the Sharks in the United Rugby Championship on 7 January 2023, appearing against Connacht.

Hooker was part of the Sharks squad that won the EPCR Challenge Cup in 2024 and started in the final, contributing to the franchise's first European title.

Later that year he also started the 2024 Currie Cup final, scoring a try as the Sharks defeated the Lions to claim the title.

== International career ==
Hooker represented the South Africa Under-20 at the 2023 World Rugby U20 Championship, scoring a try on debut against Georgia U20 on 24 June 2023.

He made his senior Springbok debut on 12 July 2025, coming on as a substitute against Italy at Nelson Mandela Bay Stadium in Gqeberha. He earned his second cap as a replacement against New Zealand at Eden Park, before making his first Test start at right wing in the return fixture at Sky Stadium in Wellington.

Hooker's first run-on start was widely praised as South Africa secured a record victory in Wellington, with commentators highlighting his physicality and attacking presence. Hooker scored his first test try for South Africa in their November 2025 test against Italy in Turin.

Following his performances in 2025, Hooker was nominated for the World Rugby Breakthrough Player of the Year award.

== Honours ==
Sharks

- EPCR Challenge Cup:
  - Winner: 2024
- Currie Cup:
  - Winner: 2024 Currie Cup Premier Division

South Africa

- The Rugby Championship:
  - Winner: 2025

Individual

- World Rugby Breakthrough Player of the Year:
  - Nominee: 2025

== Statistics ==
=== Test match record ===
As of 15 November 2026

Opponent	P	W	D	L	Try	Pts	%Won
Argentina	3	3	0	0	0	0	100
Australia	1	0	0	1	0	0	0
France	1	0	0	1	0	0	0
Italy	3	3	0	0	2	10	100
Japan	1	1	0	0	0	0	100
New Zealand	5	4	0	1	0	0	80
Scotland	1	1	0	0	0	0	100
Wales	1	1	0	0	1	5	100
Total	16	13	0	3	3	15	81.25

=== International tries ===
As of 8 November 2026

Try	Opposing team	Location	Venue	Competition	Date	Result	Score
1	Italy	Turin, Italy	Juventus Stadium	2025 end-of-year test	15 November 2025	Win	14–32
2	Wales	Cardiff, Wales	Millennium Stadium	2025 end-of-year test	29 November 2025	Win	0–73
3	Italy	Turin, Italy	Juventus Stadium	2026 Nations Championship	7 November 2026	Win	7–66
