= Dian Bleuler =

South African rugby union player

- Full name: Dian Bleuler
- Born: 5 August 1999 (age 27) South Africa
- Height: 1.83 m (6 ft 0 in)
- Weight: 123 kg (271 lb)

Rugby union career
- Position: Prop
- Current team: Gloucester
Senior career
Years	Team	Apps	(Points)
2021	Stormers	1	(0)
2021	Western Province	7	(0)
2021–2025	Sharks	13	(5)
2022–2025	Sharks (Currie Cup)	11	(0)
2024–2025	→ Munster	7	(10)
2025–	Gloucester	15	(0)
- Correct as of 29 May 2026
International career
Years	Team	Apps	(Points)
2019	South Africa U20s	5	(0)
- Correct as of 17 July 2021

Dian Bleuler (born 5 August 1999) is a South African rugby union player for the Gloucester in the English Premiership. His regular position is prop.

Bleuler was named in the Stormers team to face the British & Irish Lions. He made his debut for the Stormers against the British & Irish Lions during the 2021 British & Irish Lions tour to South Africa.

On 15 October 2025, Bleuler left Sharks in South Africa with immediate effect to join Gloucester in the English Premiership from the 2025-26 season.
