= Jaden Hendrikse =

South African rugby union player

- Full name: Jaden Hendrikse
- Born: 23 March 2000 (age 26) King William's Town, South Africa
- Height: 1.84 m (6 ft 1/2 in)
- Weight: 86 kg (190 lb)
- School: Dale College Boys Primary School Glenwood High School
- Notable relative: Jordan Hendrikse (brother)

Rugby union career
- Position: Scrum-half
- Current team: Sharks / Sharks (Currie Cup)
Senior career
Years	Team	Apps	(Points)
2020–	Sharks	64	(57)
2020–	Sharks (Currie Cup)	9	(10)
- Correct as of 1 November 2023
International career
Years	Team	Apps	(Points)
2019	South Africa U20	5	(38)
2021–	South Africa	20	(19)
- Correct as of 1 November 2023
Medal record
Men's Rugby union
Representing South Africa
Rugby World Cup
Gold medal – first place	2023 France	Squad

Jaden Hendrikse (born 23 March 2000) is a South African professional rugby union player for the Sharks in the United Rugby Championship, the Sharks (Currie Cup) in the Currie Cup and South Africa internationally. His regular position is scrum-half.

Hendrikse was named in the Sharks squad for the Super Rugby Unlocked competition. He made his debut for the Sharks in Round 3 of the 2020 Currie Cup Premier Division against the Blue Bulls.

== International statistics ==
=== Test Match record ===
As of 25 May 2025

Against	P	W	D	L	Tri	Pts	%Won
Argentina	6	5	0	1	2	17	83.33
Australia	2	1	0	1	0	2	50
England	1	1	0	0	0	0	100
Ireland	1	0	0	1	0	0	0
New Zealand	3	2	0	1	0	0	66.67
Romania	1	1	0	0	0	0	100
Scotland	1	1	0	0	0	0	100
Tonga	1	1	0	0	0	0	100
Wales	4	3	0	1	0	0	75
Total	20	15	0	5	2	19	75

Pld = Games Played, W = Games Won, D = Games Drawn, L = Games Lost, Tri = Tries Scored, Pts = Points Scored

=== International tries ===
As of 25 May 2025

Try	Opposing team	Location	Venue	Competition	Date	Result	Score
1	Argentina	Port Elizabeth, South Africa	Nelson Mandela Bay Stadium	2021 Rugby Championship	14 August 2021	Win	32–12
2	Argentina	Buenos Aires, Argentina	Estadio Libertadores de América	2022 Rugby Championship	17 September 2022	Win	20–36
