= Jordan Hendrikse =

South African rugby union player

- Born: 28 June 2001 (age 25) Qonce, South Africa
- Height: 188 cm (6 ft 2 in)
- Weight: 93 kg (205 lb)
- School: Glenwood High School
- Notable relative: Jaden Hendrikse (brother)

Rugby union career
- Position(s): Fly-half, Inside Centre, Fullback
- Current team: Sharks / Sharks (Currie Cup)
Senior career
Years	Team	Apps	(Points)
2021–2024	Lions	53	(376)
2021–2024	Golden Lions	9	(90)
2024–	Sharks		
2024–	Sharks (Currie Cup)		
- Correct as of 15 September 2024
International career
Years	Team	Apps	(Points)
2022	South Africa Sevens	4	(0)
2024-	South Africa	2	(22)
- Correct as of 22 June 2024

Jordan Hendrikse (born 28 June 2001) is a South African rugby union player for the Sharks in the United Rugby Championship and the Currie Cup, and South Africa internationally. His regular position is fly-half. He is Jaden Hendrikse's brother.

== Career ==
=== Lions ===
Hendrikse was named in the Lions squad for the Pro14 Rainbow Cup SA competition. He made his debut for the Lions in Round 2 of the Pro14 Rainbow Cup SA against the Sharks. He was named in the Lions squad for the inaugural United Rugby Championship competition, with the first match on 24 September 2021 against Zebre.

=== Sharks ===
In July 2024, it was announced that Hendrikse would be returning to Durban to join the Sharks for the 2024 season, opening up the possibility of playing alongside his brother. He found instant success, landing a 59m penalty kick in the final minute of the 2024 Currie Cup Final to win the trophy for the Sharks.
