= Jurenzo Julius =

South African rugby union player

- Full name: Jurenzo Julius
- Born: 11 May 2004 (age 22) Mariental, Namibia
- Height: 1.78 m (5 ft 10 in)
- Weight: 96 kg (212 lb)
- School: Paul Roos Gymnasium

Rugby union career
- Position(s): Center, Wing, Fullback
- Current team: Sharks / Sharks (Currie Cup)
Senior career
Years	Team	Apps	(Points)
2024–	Sharks	18	(25)
2024–	Sharks (Currie Cup)	3	(15)
- Correct as of 25 January 2025
International career
Years	Team	Apps	(Points)
2023-2024	South Africa Under-20	13	(35)

Jurenzo ‘The Boogie Man’ Julius is a Namibian-born rugby union player playing in South Africa for the Sharks in the United Rugby Championship. His regular position is center. Julius signed for the Sharks straight out of highschool.

== Career ==
Julius made his debut for the Sharks in the United Rugby Championship on 28 September 2024 against Connacht.

Julius represented South Africa at U20 level 13 times, making his debut against Georgia on the 24th of August 2023.
