= Vincent Tshituka =

South African rugby union player

- Full name: Vincent Tshikaya Tshituka
- Born: 10 September 1998 (age 28) Lubumbashi, Democratic Republic of the Congo
- Height: 1.95 m (6 ft 5 in)
- Weight: 107 kg (236 lb; 16 st 12 lb)
- School: Northcliff High School
- Notable relative: Emmanuel Tshituka (brother)

Rugby union career
- Position: Flank
- Current team: Sharks / Sharks (Currie Cup)
Youth career
- 2016–2019: Golden Lions
Senior career
Years	Team	Apps	(Points)
2018	Golden Lions XV	7	(15)
2018–2022	Golden Lions	20	(5)
2019–2022	Lions	36	(20)
2022–	Sharks	48	(20)
2023–	Sharks (Currie Cup)	0	(0)
- Correct as of 17 December 2022
International career
Years	Team	Apps	(Points)
2025-	South Africa	1	(0)
2026	South Africa 'A'	1	(0)
- Correct as of 24 June 2026

Vincent Tshikaya Tshituka (born 10 September 1998) is a Congolese born South African rugby union player for the Sharks in United Rugby Championship. His regular position is flank.

== Early life ==
Born in the Democratic Republic of the Congo, Tshituka emigrated with his family, including younger brother Emmanuel Tshituka, to South Africa in 2002. Prior to playing rugby, he focused on hip-hop dancing, and intended on pursuing a degree in software and app development. Tshituka first played rugby while attending University of Johannesburg.

== Club career ==
=== Lions ===
Tshituka made his debut for the Lions during the 2019 Super Rugby season, as a substitute against the Bulls, before making his first start the following week against the Jaguares. He was named as URC Player of the Month for April 2022.

=== Sharks ===
Ahead of the 2022–23 United Rugby Championship, Tshituka signed with the Sharks. He made his debut alongside Eben Etzebeth for the Sharks against Glasgow Warriors in October 2022.

He signed an extension in December 2024, despite interest from clubs in Europe. Tshituka was named as the Sharks Player of the Year in June 2025. Tshituka has served as captain on numerous occasions. Tshituka signed an extension at the end of the 2025–26 United Rugby Championship.

== International career ==
=== South Africa ===
In 2024, he gained South African citizenship, making him eligible to represent South Africa.

In June 2025, he played for South Africa in an uncapped friendly against the Barbarians, scoring twice.

Tshituka made his international debut on 5 July 2025, against Italy.

== Statistics ==
=== Test match record ===
As of 11 July 2026

Opponent	P	W	D	L	Try	Pts	%Won
Italy	1	1	0	0	0	0	100
Scotland	1	1	0	0	0	0	100
Total	2	2	0	0	0	0	100
