= Bradley Davids =

South African rugby union player

- Full name: Bradley Davids
- Born: South Africa
- Height

Rugby union career
- Position: Scrum-half
- Current team: Sharks (Currie Cup)
Senior career
Years	Team	Apps	(Points)
2022–	Sharks (Currie Cup)	3	(0)
2022–	Sharks		
- Correct as of 23 July 2022

Bradley Davids is a South African rugby union player for the Sharks in the Currie Cup. His regular position is scrum-half.

Davids was named in the Sharks side for the 2022 Currie Cup Premier Division. He made his Currie Cup debut for the Sharks against the Pumas in Round 5 of the 2022 Currie Cup Premier Division.
