= Jean Smith (rugby union) =

Italian-born South African rugby union player

- Born: 1 April 2003 (age 23) Treviso, Italy
- Height: 1.81 m (5 ft 11 in)
- Weight: 89 kg (196 lb; 14 st 0 lb)
- School: Grey College
- Notable relative(s): Franco Smith (father); Franco Smith (brother)

Rugby union career
- Position: Fly-half
- Current team: Sharks
Youth career
- 2008–2014: Benetton Treviso
- 2014–2021: Grey College
- 2021–2024: Sharks
Senior career
| Years | Team | Apps | (Points) |
| 2024– | Sharks | 1 | (4) |
- Correct as of 13 April 2025
International career
| Years | Team | Apps | (Points) |
| 2019 | South Africa U16 | | |
| 2021 | South Africa U18 | | |
| 2023 | South Africa U20 | 4 | (36) |
- Correct as of 13 April 2025

Jean Smith (born 1 April 2003) is an Italian born South African rugby union player, who plays for the Sharks in the United Rugby Championship.

== Career ==
Born in Treviso, Italy while his father, Franco Smith was playing for Benetton Treviso in the Super 10 at the time. Smith began playing his rugby for the Benetton youth sides starting at the age of 5, before he moved back to South Africa in 2014. Moving to Grey College in Bloemfontein. His first international call up came in 2019 playing for South Africa's under-16 team.

After leaving school he joined Durban based URC side the Sharks, playing in the SA Rugby under-21 Cup before being selected to join the South Africa under-20 side for the 2023 World Rugby U20 Championship, making 4 starts scoring 36 points in the tournament with South Africa finishing 3rd.

In the 2024-25 EPCR Challenge Cup, Smith made his senior debut for the Sharks coming off the bench to score 2 conversions in a 34-21 round of 16 loss against Lyon OU.
