= Hakeem Kunene =

South African rugby union player

- Born: 3 February 2003 (age 23) Paarl, South Africa
- Height: 183 cm (6 ft 0 in)
- Weight: 90 kg (198 lb; 14 st 2 lb)
- School: Paarl Boys' High School

Rugby union career
- Position: Fullback
- Current team: Sharks / Sharks (Currie Cup)
Senior career
Years	Team	Apps	(Points)
2024–	Sharks (Currie Cup)		
2024–	Sharks	8	(5)
- Correct as of 26 October 2025
International career
Years	Team	Apps	(Points)
2023	South Africa U20	3	(0)
- Correct as of 26 October 2025

Hakeem Kunene (born 3 February 2003) is a South African rugby union player, who plays for the Sharks and Sharks (Currie Cup). His preferred position is fullback.

== Early career ==
Francis attended Paarl Boys' High School where he played for the first XV. His performances earned him selection for South Africa at U18 level, before going on to represent at South Africa at U20 level in 2023.

== Professional career ==
Kunene came through the Sharks system, representing their U21 side. He made his Currie Cup debut for the Sharks in 2024 and represented the side again in 2025. He made his debut for the Sharks in the 2024–25 European Rugby Champions Cup.
