= Emile van Heerden =

South African rugby union player (born 2000)

- Full name: Emile van Heerden
- Born: 8 August 2000 (age 26) Nelspruit, South Africa
- Height: 2.00 m (6 ft 6 1/2 in)
- Weight: 110 kg (17 st 5 lb; 243 lb)

Rugby union career
- Position: Lock
- Current team: Sharks / Sharks (Currie Cup)
Senior career
Years	Team	Apps	(Points)
2020–	Sharks	0	(0)
2020–	Sharks (Currie Cup)	9	(0)
2022–2023	→ Lions	3	(0)
- Correct as of 22 January 2023
International career
Years	Team	Apps	(Points)
2019	South Africa U20	3	(0)
- Correct as of 16 August 2021

Emile van Heerden (born 8 August 2000) is a South African rugby union player for the Sharks in the Currie Cup and Sharks. His regular position is lock.

Van Heerden was named in the Sharks side for the 2021 Currie Cup Premier Division. He made his debut for the Sharks in Round 11 of the 2021 Currie Cup against the Free State Cheetahs.
