= Siya Masuku =

South African rugby union player

- Full name: Siyabonga Praisegod Masuku
- Born: 1 August 1996 (age 30) Paulpietersburg, Kwa-Zulu Natal, South Africa
- Height: 1.89 m (6 ft 2 1/2 in)
- Weight: 95 kg (209 lb; 14 st 13 lb)
- School: Piet Retief High School

Rugby union career
- Position: Fly-half
- Current team: Sharks
Youth career
- 2013–2014: Pumas
- 2015: Leopards
- 2016–2017: Golden Lions
Senior career
Years	Team	Apps	(Points)
2016	Golden Lions XV	13	(92)
2017	Golden Lions	2	(0)
2019	Leopards	1	(3)
2019–2020	Southern Kings	4	(10)
2021–2023	Free State Cheetahs	18	(18)
2021–2023	Cheetahs	4	(19)
2024–	Sharks	12	(120)
- Correct as of 2 June 2024

Siyabonga Praisegod Masuku (born 1 August 1996) is a South African rugby union player for the Sharks in the United Rugby Championship as a fly-half.
