= List of Stormers players =

This is a list of rugby union footballers who have played for the Stormers in Super Rugby, the Pro14 and United Rugby Championship competitions, and the European Rugby Champions Cup and EPCR Challenge Cup competitions. The list includes any player that has played in a regular season match, semi-final or final for the Stormers, ordered by debut date and name. The Stormers competed in Super Rugby as Western Province in 1996, as the Western Stormers in 1998 and as the Stormers between 1999 and 2020, competed in the Pro14 Rainbow Cup in 2021, in the United Rugby Championship from 2021, the European Rugby Champions Cup from 2022/23.

== Super Rugby players ==
No.	Name	Caps	Tries	C	P	DG	Points	Debut	Last
1	Simon Berridge	6	2				10	02/03/1996	30/03/1996
2	Louis Blom	10	1				5	02/03/1996	10/05/1996
3	Robby Brink	39	1				5	02/03/1996	27/04/2001
4	Vlok Cilliers	9	1	4	1		16	02/03/1996	10/05/1996
5	Corné Krige	62	5				25	02/03/1996	23/04/2004
6	Tommie Laubscher	7						02/03/1996	10/05/1996
7	Tinus Linee	9	1				5	02/03/1996	12/03/1999
8	Garry Pagel	10	1				5	02/03/1996	10/05/1996
9	Andrew Paterson	1						02/03/1996	02/03/1996
10	Pieter Rossouw	74	31				155	02/03/1996	01/05/2004
11	Russel Roux	5						02/03/1996	03/04/1996
12	Gerald Scholtz	3						02/03/1996	23/04/1996
13	Justin Swart	17	8				40	02/03/1996	02/05/1998
14	Fritz van Heerden	9						02/03/1996	23/04/1996
15	Nico Wegner	10	1				5	02/03/1996	10/05/1996
16	Mornay Visser	11						02/03/1996	10/05/1996
17	Michael Kirsten	2						02/03/1996	10/05/1996
18	Jan Maree	3						02/03/1996	30/03/1996
19	Joel Stransky	10		12	31	1	120	09/03/1996	10/05/1996
20	Johan Kapp	6	3				15	09/03/1996	10/05/1996
21	Toks van der Linde	32	1				5	09/03/1996	07/05/2000
22	Rhys Botha	9	1				5	16/03/1996	10/05/1996
23	Percy Montgomery	61	11	27	34	2	217	16/03/1996	28/03/2009
24	Joggie Viljoen	22	5				25	16/03/1996	27/04/2001
25	Bobby Skinstad	27	8				40	16/03/1996	11/05/2002
26	Keith Andrews	1						30/03/1996	30/03/1996
27	Ricardo van Zyl	2						03/04/1996	13/04/1996
28	Dion O'Cuinneagain	4						13/04/1996	10/05/1996
29	Jurian Prins	2						23/04/1996	10/05/1996
30	Andrew Aitken	6	3				15	27/02/1998	26/04/1998
31	Julian Barnard	4						27/02/1998	14/04/2000
32	Marius Hurter	8						27/02/1998	02/05/1998
33	Harold Karele	11						27/02/1998	16/05/1998
34	Louis Koen	12	2	20	11	1	86	27/02/1998	12/03/1999
35	Charl Marais	42	4				20	27/02/1998	12/05/2001
36	Dick Muir	8	1				5	27/02/1998	26/04/1998
37	James Small	6	1				5	27/02/1998	16/05/1998
38	Johnny Trytsman	23						27/02/1998	22/05/1999
39	Selborne Boome	42	5				25	27/02/1998	03/02/2007
40	Johan van Wyk	17	1				5	27/02/1998	07/05/2000
41	Christian Stewart	9						27/02/1998	09/05/1998
42	Breyton Paulse	79	35				175	27/02/1998	05/05/2007
43	Jannie Coetzee	7						07/03/1998	16/05/1998
44	Jaco Espag	1						07/03/1998	07/03/1998
45	Pierre Marais	6						07/03/1998	16/05/1998
46	Cobus Visagie	52	1				5	14/03/1998	10/05/2003
47	Robbie Fleck	48	16				80	14/03/1998	26/04/2003
48	Pieter O'Neill	1						14/03/1998	14/03/1998
49	Hottie Louw	62	2				10	28/03/1998	10/05/2003
50	Jopie Adlam	7	2				10	03/04/1998	16/05/1998
51	Rickus Lubbe	4						03/04/1998	16/05/1998
52	Petrus Arnold	3						02/05/1998	16/05/1998
53	Johan Human	1						09/05/1998	09/05/1998
54	Chester Williams	2	2				10	09/05/1998	16/05/1998
55	Matthys Stoltz	13						09/05/1998	11/05/2002
56	Lodewyk Hattingh	4	1				5	27/02/1999	19/03/1999
57	Robbi Kempson	35	1				5	27/02/1999	10/05/2003
58	Andy Marinos	11						27/02/1999	22/05/1999
59	Braam van Straaten	32	4	66	95		443	27/02/1999	12/05/2001
60	Dan van Zyl	25	3	1		1	20	27/02/1999	07/04/2001
61	Hendrik Gerber	55	7				35	27/02/1999	15/05/2004
62	Tommie Webb	12						27/02/1999	04/03/2000
63	Anton Leonard	12	2				10	27/02/1999	22/05/1999
64	Sias Wagner	1						27/02/1999	27/02/1999
65	Robert Markram	12	1				5	07/03/1999	14/04/2001
66	John Daniels	3	2				10	12/03/1999	09/03/2001
67	Manie du Toit	2						12/03/1999	18/04/1999
68	Gus Theron	34	6				30	12/03/1999	04/03/2006
69	Chean Roux	22	2				10	01/05/1999	12/05/2001
70	Marius Bosman	1						22/05/1999	22/05/1999
71	Tokkie Kasselman	2						26/02/2000	04/03/2000
72	Brendan Venter	4						26/02/2000	18/03/2000
73	Dave von Hoesslin	5						26/02/2000	14/04/2000
74	Wayne Boardman	7						26/02/2000	08/04/2000
75	Wayne Julies	13						04/03/2000	04/05/2002
76	Johannes Brand	9	1				5	11/03/2000	13/05/2000
77	De Wet Barry	78	13				65	18/03/2000	05/05/2007
78	Brett Barrett	4						26/03/2000	14/04/2000
79	Pietie Ferreira	8	1				5	14/04/2000	16/04/2005
80	Quinton Davids	43	6				30	24/02/2001	09/04/2005
81	Faan Rautenbach	39						24/02/2001	14/05/2005
82	Adri Badenhorst	52	6				30	24/02/2001	13/05/2006
83	Chris Rossouw	20	1	19	27		124	24/02/2001	23/04/2005
84	Morné van der Merwe	11						24/02/2001	12/05/2001
85	Pieter Dixon	35	1				5	04/03/2001	23/04/2005
86	Neil de Kock	50	3				15	04/03/2001	13/05/2006
87	Stuart Abbott	7						04/03/2001	05/05/2001
88	Werner Greeff	43	8			1	43	09/03/2001	11/03/2006
89	John Slade	4						18/03/2001	12/05/2001
90	Bolla Conradie	77	10			1	53	22/02/2002	20/02/2009
91	Marius Goosen	5	1	2	5	1	27	22/02/2002	04/05/2002
92	Daan Human	33	2				10	22/02/2002	15/05/2004
93	Marius Joubert	46	11				55	22/02/2002	13/05/2006
94	Tjoepie van den Heever	24						22/02/2002	27/03/2004
95	Jeff Stevens	3						22/02/2002	08/03/2002
96	Falie Oelschig	5						08/03/2002	04/05/2002
97	Martin van Schalkwyk	4						23/03/2002	26/04/2002
98	Pierre Uys	17	1				5	12/04/2002	15/05/2004
99	Gaffie du Toit	28	1	29	18	1	120	21/02/2003	14/05/2005
100	Egon Seconds	11	1				5	21/02/2003	09/03/2007
101	Jaco Gouws	4	1				5	07/03/2003	10/05/2003
102	Lean van Dyk	4						07/03/2003	12/04/2003
103	Leon van den Heever	9	1	10	16		73	07/03/2003	10/05/2003
104	Eddie Andrews	47	4				20	07/03/2003	05/05/2007
105	Grant Esterhuizen	5	2				10	14/03/2003	10/05/2003
106	Rassie Erasmus	4						19/04/2003	10/05/2003
107	Skipper Badenhorst	2						19/04/2003	10/05/2003
108	Randle Julies	3						26/04/2003	10/05/2003
109	Rob Linde	13						26/04/2003	14/05/2005
110	Pat Barnard	14						20/02/2004	07/05/2005
111	Willem Stoltz	9						28/02/2004	15/05/2004
112	Gavin Hume	7	1				5	28/02/2004	23/04/2004
113	David Britz	6	1				5	13/03/2004	15/05/2004
114	Schalk Burger	123	9				45	13/03/2004	23/07/2016
115	Tonderai Chavhanga	37	14				70	20/03/2004	16/05/2009
116	Gerrie Britz	30	1				5	25/02/2005	05/05/2007
117	Jean de Villiers	105	28				140	25/02/2005	03/05/2014
118	Joe van Niekerk	21	2				10	25/02/2005	05/05/2007
119	Luke Watson	62	10				50	25/02/2005	16/05/2009
120	Riaan Olckers	7						25/02/2005	14/05/2005
121	Tiger Mangweni	2						25/02/2005	14/05/2005
122	Andries Bekker	105	15				75	05/03/2005	17/05/2013
123	JD Moller	53						05/03/2005	08/05/2010
124	Hanyani Shimange	15						05/03/2005	06/03/2010
125	David Hendricks	6						09/04/2005	18/02/2006
126	Lukas van Biljon	5						09/04/2005	14/05/2005
127	Ross Skeate	34	1				5	23/04/2005	18/05/2008
128	Rayno Benjamin	11	1				5	11/02/2006	13/05/2006
129	Peter Grant	104	10	124	187		859	11/02/2006	12/07/2014
130	Jongi Nokwe	6	2				10	11/02/2006	21/04/2006
131	Schalk Brits	52	4				20	11/02/2006	02/07/2011
132	Attie Winter	2						11/02/2006	18/02/2006
133	Henk Eksteen	6						11/02/2006	21/04/2006
134	Neil Fullard	8						24/02/2006	13/05/2006
135	Chumani Booi	5						04/03/2006	13/05/2006
136	Justin Melck	13	1				5	04/03/2006	21/04/2007
137	Naas Olivier	17	3	7	12		65	04/03/2006	05/05/2007
138	Joe Pietersen	50	9	36	86		374	18/03/2006	06/07/2013
139	Huia Edmonds	3						06/05/2006	24/03/2007
140	Gio Aplon	84	17		1	1	91	03/02/2007	12/07/2014
141	Conrad Jantjes	38	4				20	03/02/2007	02/07/2011
142	Corne Uys	10	1				5	03/02/2007	05/05/2007
143	Brok Harris	93	2				10	03/02/2007	17/05/2014
144	Tiaan Liebenberg	73	5				25	03/02/2007	12/07/2014
145	JP Joubert	11						03/02/2007	05/05/2007
146	Robbie Diack	17	1				5	03/02/2007	18/05/2008
147	Brent Russell	11	3				15	03/02/2007	05/05/2007
148	Dylan des Fountain	18	3				15	16/02/2007	16/05/2009
149	Schalk Ferreira	16						16/02/2007	16/05/2009
150	François van der Merwe	6	1				5	24/02/2007	23/02/2008
151	Gcobani Bobo	25	2				10	16/02/2008	16/05/2009
152	Ricky Januarie	54	3				15	16/02/2008	11/06/2011
153	Francois Louw	52	4				20	16/02/2008	02/07/2011
154	Brian Mujati	22						16/02/2008	16/05/2009
155	Sireli Naqelevuki	36	11				55	16/02/2008	08/05/2010
156	Adriaan Fondse	30						16/02/2008	29/05/2010
157	Pieter Myburgh	5						29/02/2008	17/05/2008
158	Deon Fourie	84	12				60	29/02/2008	05/07/2014
159	Tony Brown	8			4		12	22/03/2008	18/05/2008
160	Conrad Hoffmann	1						28/03/2008	28/03/2008
161	Wylie Human	6	1				5	03/05/2008	18/04/2009
162	Nick Köster	26	2				10	14/02/2009	20/04/2012
163	Duane Vermeulen	89	5				25	14/02/2009	30/05/2015
164	Wicus Blaauw	34						14/02/2009	02/07/2011
165	Willem de Waal	15	2	8	10	1	59	07/03/2009	22/05/2010
166	AJ Venter	10						07/03/2009	16/05/2009
167	Dewaldt Duvenage	93	7	4	4		55	07/03/2009	07/07/2018
168	Hilton Lobberts	5						18/04/2009	16/05/2009
169	Pieter Louw	22	4				20	18/04/2009	26/03/2011
170	Liam Bax	1						02/05/2009	02/05/2009
171	Martin Muller	3						02/05/2009	16/05/2009
172	Morgan Newman	3						02/05/2009	16/05/2009
173	Juan de Jongh	97	15				75	13/02/2010	22/07/2017
174	Jaque Fourie	30	13				65	13/02/2010	02/07/2011
175	Bryan Habana	57	19				95	13/02/2010	13/07/2013
176	De Kock Steenkamp	48						13/02/2010	14/03/2014
177	JC Kritzinger	11						13/02/2010	11/03/2011
178	Anton van Zyl	23	1				5	13/02/2010	02/07/2011
179	Lionel Cronjé	7		4	8		32	13/02/2010	20/05/2011
180	Eusebio Guiñazú	7						20/02/2010	22/05/2010
181	Tim Whitehead	10						20/03/2010	29/05/2010
182	Frikkie Welsh	1						02/04/2010	02/04/2010
183	Rynhardt Elstadt	58	2				10	26/02/2011	22/07/2017
184	Danie Poolman	10	1				5	26/02/2011	30/06/2012
185	Gary van Aswegen	15		3	7	1	30	26/02/2011	13/07/2013
186	CJ van der Linde	11						26/02/2011	20/05/2011
187	Scarra Ntubeni	76	5				25	26/02/2011	14/11/2020
188	Frans Malherbe	109	3				15	26/02/2011	14/11/2020
189	Ethienne Reynecke	2						09/04/2011	30/04/2011
190	Johann Sadie	7	2				10	09/04/2011	02/07/2011
191	Kurt Coleman	42	2	28	38	1	183	30/04/2011	27/05/2017
192	Steven Kitshoff	100	3				15	14/05/2011	14/11/2020
193	Earl Rose	2		1			2	03/06/2011	18/06/2011
194	Louis Schreuder	66	2				10	03/06/2011	23/07/2016
195	Nic Groom	57	5				25	18/06/2011	23/07/2016
196	Eben Etzebeth	62	4				20	25/02/2012	01/06/2019
197	Gerhard van den Heever	26	2				10	25/02/2012	13/07/2013
198	Siya Kolisi	118	20				100	25/02/2012	23/10/2020
199	Burton Francis	6						25/02/2012	02/06/2012
200	Nizaam Carr	97	8				40	16/03/2012	30/06/2018
201	JP du Plessis	2						20/04/2012	28/04/2012
202	Don Armand	15						28/04/2012	13/07/2013
203	Jebb Sinclair	7	1				5	12/05/2012	14/07/2012
204	Nick Fenton-Wells	2						26/05/2012	02/06/2012
205	Deon Carstens	5						02/06/2012	28/07/2012
206	Quinn Roux	4						02/06/2012	14/07/2012
207	Tyrone Holmes	1						30/06/2012	30/06/2012
208	Marcel Brache	1						30/06/2012	30/06/2012
209	Pat Cilliers	23						22/02/2013	12/07/2014
210	Damian de Allende	91	15				75	22/02/2013	15/06/2019
211	Elton Jantjies	13			3		9	22/02/2013	13/07/2013
212	Jaco Taute	23	1			1	8	22/02/2013	23/07/2016
213	Martin Bezuidenhout	8						22/02/2013	13/07/2013
214	Michael Rhodes	26	2				10	06/04/2013	20/06/2015
215	Gerbrandt Grobler	5						13/04/2013	13/07/2013
216	Marius Coetzer	1						25/05/2013	25/05/2013
217	Rohan Kitshoff	2						25/05/2013	17/05/2014
218	Manuel Carizza	17						22/02/2014	20/06/2015
219	Demetri Catrakilis	24		23	55	1	214	22/02/2014	20/06/2015
220	Michael van der Spuy	4						22/02/2014	17/05/2014
221	Kobus van Wyk	30	9				45	22/02/2014	23/07/2016
222	Ryno Eksteen	2						22/02/2014	23/10/2020
223	Oli Kebble	47	1				5	22/02/2014	22/07/2017
224	Sailosi Tagicakibau	10	1				5	08/03/2014	12/07/2014
225	Ruan Botha	21	1				5	14/03/2014	13/06/2015
226	Martin Dreyer	5						14/03/2014	12/07/2014
227	Jurie van Vuuren	8						22/03/2014	28/02/2015
228	Sikhumbuzo Notshe	58	13				65	29/03/2014	01/06/2019
229	Stephan Coetzee	7						29/03/2014	12/07/2014
230	Devon Williams	3	1				5	19/04/2014	10/05/2014
231	Cheslin Kolbe	49	12	7			74	03/05/2014	22/07/2017
232	Jean Kleyn	18						10/05/2014	16/07/2016
233	Ali Vermaak	31						10/05/2014	22/02/2020
234	Dylon Frylinck	1						24/05/2014	24/05/2014
235	Sti Sithole	3						31/05/2014	12/07/2014
236	Seabelo Senatla	33	8				40	05/07/2014	14/03/2020
237	Vincent Koch	33	7				35	14/02/2015	23/07/2016
238	Johnny Kôtze	19	1				5	14/02/2015	21/05/2016
239	Dillyn Leyds	71	21				105	14/02/2015	14/03/2020
240	Bongi Mbonambi	69	4				20	14/02/2015	14/11/2020
241	Wilco Louw	52	6				30	14/02/2015	14/03/2020
242	Huw Jones	23	5				25	14/02/2015	23/07/2016
243	Neil Rautenbach	3						07/03/2015	13/06/2015
244	Patrick Howard	2						25/04/2015	13/06/2015
245	Robert du Preez	14	4	27	11		107	13/06/2015	05/05/2017
246	Mike Willemse	3						13/06/2015	23/04/2016
247	Godlen Masimla	12	1				5	13/06/2015	14/11/2020
248	Jan de Klerk	21	1				5	13/06/2015	07/07/2018
249	Pieter-Steph du Toit	55	3				15	27/02/2016	29/02/2020
250	Jano Vermaak	22	1				5	27/02/2016	15/06/2019
251	JC Janse van Rensburg	40	1				5	27/02/2016	07/07/2018
252	Leolin Zas	18	9				45	27/02/2016	31/10/2020
253	JD Schickerling	37	1				5	27/02/2016	14/11/2020
254	Jean-Luc du Plessis	39	3	47	41		232	19/03/2016	14/03/2020
255	Brandon Thomson	7	1	6	3		26	23/04/2016	19/05/2017
256	Dan du Plessis	20	5				25	28/05/2016	14/11/2020
257	Scott van Breda	3						02/07/2016	16/07/2016
258	JP Smith	3						02/07/2016	16/07/2016
259	Chris van Zyl	42	1				5	16/07/2016	14/11/2020
260	Kobus van Dyk	29	2				10	16/07/2016	25/05/2019
261	SP Marais	29	6	20	36		178	25/02/2017	05/04/2019
262	EW Viljoen	29	7				35	25/02/2017	08/06/2019
263	Dan Kriel	17						25/02/2017	15/06/2019
264	Ramone Samuels	32	3				15	25/02/2017	07/07/2018
265	Bjorn Basson	6	3				15	11/03/2017	08/07/2017
266	Justin Phillips	24	2				10	11/03/2017	01/06/2019
267	Jaco Coetzee	24	3				15	11/03/2017	31/10/2020
268	Damian Willemse	40	9	44	32	1	232	11/03/2017	14/11/2020
269	Cobus Wiese	32	2				10	25/03/2017	14/03/2020
270	Caylib Oosthuizen	3						25/03/2017	05/05/2017
271	Johan du Toit	14	1				5	15/04/2017	14/03/2020
272	Shaun Treeby	4						28/04/2017	01/07/2017
273	Juarno Augustus	19	5				25	08/07/2017	14/11/2020
274	Stephan de Wit	1						08/07/2017	08/07/2017
275	Frans van Wyk	2						08/07/2017	15/07/2017
276	Raymond Rhule	15	6				30	17/02/2018	07/07/2018
277	Carlü Sadie	9						17/02/2018	27/04/2018
278	Dean Muir	6						17/02/2018	24/03/2018
279	JJ Engelbrecht	20	3				15	24/02/2018	15/06/2019
280	George Whitehead	3		1			2	24/02/2018	24/03/2018
281	Salmaan Moerat	19						09/03/2018	14/11/2020
282	Craig Barry	10	1				5	17/03/2018	08/06/2019
283	Paul de Wet	10	2				10	17/03/2018	07/11/2020
284	Neethling Fouché	10	2				10	17/03/2018	07/11/2020
285	Joshua Stander	13	1	15	12		71	24/03/2018	15/06/2019
286	Herschel Jantjies	25	10				50	07/07/2018	14/11/2020
287	Ruhan Nel	16	4				20	16/02/2019	14/11/2020
288	Corné Fourie	16						16/02/2019	15/06/2019
289	Sergeal Petersen	17	4				20	23/02/2019	17/10/2020
290	Michael Kumbirai	1						05/04/2019	05/04/2019
291	Ernst van Rhyn	17	1				5	12/04/2019	14/11/2020
292	Chad Solomon	8						25/05/2019	23/10/2020
293	Marno Redelinghuys	1						01/06/2019	01/06/2019
294	Dan Jooste	1						01/06/2019	01/06/2019
295	Edwill van der Merwe	5						08/06/2019	07/11/2020
296	Chris Massyn	2						08/06/2019	15/06/2019
297	David Meihuizen	4						08/06/2019	07/11/2020
298	Jamie Roberts	6						01/02/2020	14/03/2020
299	Rikus Pretorius	7	2				10	01/02/2020	14/11/2020
300	Kwenzo Blose	4						29/02/2020	07/11/2020
301	Warrick Gelant	5	2				10	17/10/2020	14/11/2020
302	Tim Swiel	4		6			12	17/10/2020	07/11/2020
303	Nama Xaba	2						17/10/2020	23/10/2020
304	Michal Haznar	2						17/10/2020	14/11/2020
305	Leon Lyons	2						23/10/2020	14/11/2020
306	Marcel Theunissen	3						31/10/2020	14/11/2020
307	Ben-Jason Dixon	3						31/10/2020	14/11/2020
308	Angelo Davids	2	1				5	07/11/2020	14/11/2020
309	Sazi Sandi	1						14/11/2020	14/11/2020
310	Kade Wolhuter	1						14/11/2020	14/11/2020

== Pro14/United Rugby Championship players ==
No.	Name	Caps	Tries	C	P	DG	Points	Debut	Last
1	Pieter-Steph du Toit	4	1				5	01/05/2021	04/06/2021
2	Willie Engelbrecht	47	4				20	01/05/2021	28/03/2025
3	Herschel Jantjies	62	8				40	01/05/2021	30/05/2025
4	Steven Kitshoff	31	1				5	01/05/2021	27/05/2023
5	Frans Malherbe	37	2				10	01/05/2021	22/03/2025
6	Ruhan Nel	67	19				95	01/05/2021	31/10/2026
7	Scarra Ntubeni	26	3				15	01/05/2021	18/04/2026
8	Marvin Orie	37						01/05/2021	27/05/2023
9	Rikus Pretorius	16	4				20	01/05/2021	04/06/2022
10	JD Schickerling	35	3				15	01/05/2021	31/10/2026
11	Seabelo Senatla	41	17				85	01/05/2021	31/10/2026
12	Edwill van der Merwe	8	7				35	01/05/2021	15/10/2021
13	Damian Willemse	68	12	11	1	4	97	01/05/2021	31/10/2026
14	Kade Wolhuter	4		6	4		24	01/05/2021	27/01/2023
15	Nama Xaba	21	3				15	01/05/2021	20/04/2024
16	Dan du Plessis	66	7				35	01/05/2021	06/06/2026
17	Ernst van Rhyn	33	1				5	01/05/2021	21/04/2023
18	Bongi Mbonambi	5	1				5	01/05/2021	04/06/2021
19	Abner van Reenen	4		6	4		24	01/05/2021	22/05/2021
20	Neethling Fouché	92	2				10	01/05/2021	31/10/2026
21	Ali Vermaak	50						01/05/2021	03/01/2026
22	Godlen Masimla	15						01/05/2021	31/12/2022
23	Evan Roos	79	35				175	01/05/2021	31/10/2026
24	David Meihuizen	5						08/05/2021	26/02/2022
25	Sergeal Petersen	13	2				10	08/05/2021	18/06/2022
26	Marcel Theunissen	77	10				50	08/05/2021	06/06/2026
27	Leolin Zas	75	28				140	08/05/2021	31/10/2026
28	Leon Lyons	11						08/05/2021	26/10/2024
29	Paul de Wet	65	11				55	08/05/2021	16/05/2025
30	Cornel Smit	5						08/05/2021	27/01/2023
31	Tim Swiel	9	1	9	7		44	15/05/2021	20/03/2022
32	Juarno Augustus	2						15/05/2021	22/05/2021
33	Ben-Jason Dixon	69	2				10	15/05/2021	06/06/2026
34	Johan du Toit	1						15/05/2021	15/05/2021
35	Adré Smith	66	8				40	22/05/2021	31/10/2026
36	Rosko Specman	1						04/06/2021	04/06/2021
37	Andre-Hugo Venter	79	10				50	04/06/2021	24/10/2026
38	Deon Fourie	47	7				35	25/09/2021	24/10/2026
39	Warrick Gelant	65	11		1		58	25/09/2021	24/10/2026
40	Manie Libbok	58	10	123	73	2	521	25/09/2021	30/05/2025
41	Salmaan Moerat	46	2				10	25/09/2021	06/06/2026
42	Dian Bleuler	1						25/09/2021	25/09/2021
43	Sazi Sandi	47	3				15	25/09/2021	02/10/2026
44	Stefan Ungerer	41	3				15	25/09/2021	02/10/2026
45	Juan de Jongh	4						25/09/2021	27/01/2023
46	Brok Harris	68						02/10/2021	26/04/2025
47	Justin Basson	1						09/10/2021	09/10/2021
48	JJ Kotze	48	4				20	09/10/2021	10/10/2026
49	Junior Pokomela	23	6				30	15/10/2021	18/02/2023
50	Kwenzo Blose	12						15/10/2021	18/05/2024
51	Tristan Leyds	2						04/12/2021	03/12/2022
52	Lee-Marvin Mazibuko	4						04/12/2021	24/11/2023
53	Hacjivah Dayimani	56	9				45	22/01/2022	24/10/2026
54	Angelo Davids	29	11				55	29/01/2022	15/02/2025
55	Chad Solomon	5						20/03/2022	08/10/2022
56	Connor Evans	32	1				5	02/04/2022	31/10/2026
57	Wilmar Arnoldi	1						30/04/2022	30/04/2022
58	Sacha Feinberg-Mngomezulu	50	22	77	38	4	390	04/06/2022	24/10/2026
59	Clayton Blommetjies	26	7	7	1		52	24/09/2022	08/02/2025
60	Suleiman Hartzenberg	44	15				75	24/09/2022	15/05/2026
61	Joseph Dweba	48	9				45	01/10/2022	30/05/2025
62	Alapati Leiua	3						08/10/2022	22/10/2022
63	Jean-Luc du Plessis	16	2	1			12	25/11/2022	28/12/2024
64	Gary Porter	16						25/11/2022	25/09/2026
65	Mnombo Zwelendaba	1						03/12/2022	03/12/2022
66	Imad Khan	12	2				10	08/01/2023	06/06/2026
67	Ruben van Heerden	60	2				10	27/01/2023	30/05/2026
68	Keke Morabe	15	1				5	04/02/2023	15/05/2026
69	Lizo Gqoboka	3						21/10/2023	23/03/2024
70	Ben Loader	24	8				40	21/10/2023	30/05/2025
71	Courtnall Skosan	4	3				15	28/10/2023	02/12/2023
72	Sti Sithole	17						28/10/2023	16/05/2025
73	Hendré Stassen	2						24/11/2023	30/12/2023
74	Jurie Matthee	25	2	24	33		157	30/12/2023	25/09/2026
75	Wandisile Simelane	38	6				30	17/02/2024	31/10/2026
76	Dave Ewers	6						28/09/2024	16/05/2025
77	Dewaldt Duvenage	8						05/10/2024	28/03/2026
78	Louw Nel	13						05/10/2024	31/10/2026
79	Paul de Villiers	32	9				45	21/12/2024	31/10/2026
80	Jonathan Roche	12						25/01/2025	10/10/2026
81	Vernon Matongo	22						19/04/2025	31/10/2026
82	Zachary Porthen	13	1				5	10/05/2025	24/10/2026
83	Ruan Ackermann	7						26/09/2025	06/06/2026
84	Olly Reid	3	1				5	26/09/2025	24/10/2026
85	Clinton Swart	3						26/09/2025	29/11/2025
86	JC Mars	1						18/10/2025	18/10/2025
87	Hencus van Wyk	1						18/10/2025	18/10/2025
88	Cobus Reinach	10	1				5	25/10/2025	31/10/2026
89	Dylan Maart	4	2				10	29/11/2025	28/02/2026
90	Oli Kebble	7						29/11/2025	15/05/2026
91	Ntuthuko Mchunu	18	7				35	20/12/2025	31/10/2026
92	Lukhanyo Vokozela	3						20/12/2025	24/10/2026
93	Markus Muller	3						25/04/2026	31/10/2026
94	Riley Norton	5						25/09/2026	31/10/2026
95	André Warner	2						25/09/2026	02/10/2026
96	Yaqeen Ahmed	4	3	6	2		33	25/09/2026	31/10/2026
97	Ezekiel Ngobeni	1	1				5	25/09/2026	25/09/2026
98	Vernon Paulo	3	1				5	25/09/2026	31/10/2026
99	Siya Kolisi	2						02/10/2026	10/10/2026
100	Wandile Mlaba	2						02/10/2026	31/10/2026
101	Wilco Louw	2						10/10/2026	31/10/2026
102	Haashim Pead	3	1				5	10/10/2026	31/10/2026
103	Altus Rabe	1						31/10/2026	31/10/2026

== European Rugby Champions Cup/Challenge Cup players ==
No.	Name	Caps	Tries	C	P	DG	Points	Debut	Last
1	Clayton Blommetjies	7			1		3	10/12/2022	18/01/2025
2	Hacjivah Dayimani	11	2				10	10/12/2022	04/04/2026
3	Joseph Dweba	12	1				5	10/12/2022	18/01/2025
4	Neethling Fouché	16						10/12/2022	04/04/2026
5	Deon Fourie	12	4				20	10/12/2022	17/10/2026
6	Herschel Jantjies	11	4				20	10/12/2022	18/01/2025
7	Steven Kitshoff	6	1				5	10/12/2022	08/04/2023
8	Alapati Leiua	1						10/12/2022	10/12/2022
9	Manie Libbok	11	2	21	12		88	10/12/2022	11/01/2025
10	Salmaan Moerat	8						10/12/2022	13/12/2025
11	Ruhan Nel	10	1				5	10/12/2022	04/04/2026
12	Gary Porter	4						10/12/2022	14/12/2024
13	Ernst van Rhyn	3						10/12/2022	08/04/2023
14	Damian Willemse	13	2				10	10/12/2022	17/10/2026
15	Leolin Zas	11	7				35	10/12/2022	17/10/2026
16	Ben-Jason Dixon	14						10/12/2022	17/01/2026
17	Junior Pokomela	5	1				5	10/12/2022	10/12/2023
18	Angelo Davids	6	1				5	10/12/2022	14/12/2024
19	Sazi Sandi	7						10/12/2022	17/10/2026
20	Paul de Wet	11	1				5	10/12/2022	11/01/2025
21	Marcel Theunissen	15	2				10	10/12/2022	04/04/2026
22	Andre-Hugo Venter	14	5				25	10/12/2022	17/10/2026
23	Ali Vermaak	10						10/12/2022	05/12/2025
24	Willie Engelbrecht	10	2				10	17/12/2022	18/01/2025
25	Frans Malherbe	6						17/12/2022	18/01/2025
26	Marvin Orie	5	1				5	17/12/2022	08/04/2023
27	Suleiman Hartzenberg	14	4				20	17/12/2022	17/01/2026
28	Connor Evans	13						17/12/2022	17/10/2026
29	JJ Kotze	11						17/12/2022	17/10/2026
30	Brok Harris	9						17/12/2022	06/04/2024
31	Dan du Plessis	9	1				5	15/01/2023	04/04/2026
32	Sacha Feinberg-Mngomezulu	6		15	3		39	15/01/2023	17/10/2026
33	Stefan Ungerer	7						15/01/2023	17/01/2026
34	Simon Miller	1						15/01/2023	15/01/2023
35	Kade Wolhuter	1			2		6	21/01/2023	21/01/2023
36	Jean-Luc du Plessis	6		3			6	21/01/2023	18/01/2025
37	Evan Roos	10	3				15	21/01/2023	17/10/2026
38	Seabelo Senatla	5	1				5	01/04/2023	17/10/2026
39	Ben Loader	6	1				5	10/12/2023	18/01/2025
40	Jurie Matthee	5		6	8	2	42	10/12/2023	04/04/2026
41	Keke Morabe	3	1				5	10/12/2023	07/12/2024
42	Scarra Ntubeni	2						10/12/2023	11/01/2026
43	Sti Sithole	6	1				5	10/12/2023	18/01/2025
44	Courtnall Skosan	3	1				5	10/12/2023	13/01/2024
45	Hendré Stassen	2	1				5	10/12/2023	20/01/2024
46	Nama Xaba	2						10/12/2023	13/01/2024
47	Kwenzo Blose	2						10/12/2023	20/01/2024
48	Lee-Marvin Mazibuko	1						10/12/2023	10/12/2023
49	Cornel Smit	1						10/12/2023	10/12/2023
50	Dylan Sjoblom	1						10/12/2023	10/12/2023
51	Warrick Gelant	10	4				20	16/12/2023	17/10/2026
52	Adré Smith	8	1				5	16/12/2023	17/10/2026
53	Ruben van Heerden	9	1				5	16/12/2023	17/01/2026
54	Leon Lyons	3						06/04/2024	14/12/2024
55	JD Schickerling	8	2				10	07/12/2024	17/10/2026
56	Louw Nel	3						07/12/2024	11/01/2026
57	Dave Ewers	3						14/12/2024	18/01/2025
58	Vernon Matongo	4						14/12/2024	17/10/2026
59	Wandisile Simelane	8						14/12/2024	17/10/2026
60	Paul de Villiers	8	1				5	14/12/2024	17/10/2026
61	Dewaldt Duvenage	4						14/12/2024	11/01/2026
62	Corné Weilbach	1						14/12/2024	14/12/2024
63	Jonathan Roche	7	2				10	14/12/2024	17/10/2026
64	JC Mars	2	1				5	14/12/2024	17/01/2026
65	Ruan Ackermann	2						05/12/2025	13/12/2025
66	Imad Khan	5	4	1	1		25	05/12/2025	04/04/2026
67	Dylan Maart	4	3				15	05/12/2025	17/01/2026
68	Ntuthuko Mchunu	5						05/12/2025	17/10/2026
69	Clinton Swart	2		2	4		16	05/12/2025	11/01/2026
70	Lukhanyo Vokozela	2						05/12/2025	11/01/2026
71	Cobus Reinach	3						13/12/2025	17/10/2026
72	Oli Kebble	3						13/12/2025	04/04/2026
73	Luke Burger	2						11/01/2026	17/01/2026
74	Zachary Porthen	4						11/01/2026	17/10/2026
75	Wandile Mlaba	1						11/01/2026	11/01/2026
76	Mfundo Ndhlovu	1						11/01/2026	11/01/2026
77	Alex Groves	1						11/01/2026	11/01/2026
78	Hencus van Wyk	1						11/01/2026	11/01/2026
79	Siya Kolisi	1						17/10/2026	17/10/2026
80	Riley Norton	1						17/10/2026	17/10/2026
81	Haashim Pead	1						17/10/2026	17/10/2026
