= 2024–25 Stormers season =

Stormers
- Full name: DHL Stormers
- Union: (South Africa) SARU
- Founded: 1883 (Western Province Rugby Union); 1997 (Stormers franchise)
- Location: Cape Town, South Africa
- Region: Cape Town; Cape Winelands or Boland; West Coast
- Ground: Cape Town Stadium (Capacity: 55,000)
- Coach: John Dobson
- Captain(s): Salmaan Moerat; Neethling Fouche
- League(s): United Rugby Championship; European Rugby Champions Cup
- 2023–24: Quarter-finals; South African Shield: 2nd (5th overall)
1st kit	2nd kit

Official website
- www.stormers.co.za
- Current season

The 2024–25 season is the Stormers's fourth season in the United Rugby Championship and twenty-ninth season of professional rugby. Along with competing in the URC and its South African Shield competition, the club also participated in the 2024-25 European Rugby Champions Cup.

The Stormers drew an average home attendance of 25,153 in the 2024-25 URC season.

== Senior squad ==
The Stormers squad for the 2024–25 United Rugby Championship is.

Stormers United Rugby Championship squad
**Props**: (South Africa) Neethling Fouché; (South Africa) **Lizo Gqoboka**; (South Africa) Brok Harris; (South Africa) **Steven Kitshoff**; (South Africa) **Frans Malherbe**; (South Africa) Sazi Sandi; (South Africa) Sti Sithole; (South Africa) Ali Vermaak; **Hookers**: (South Africa) **Joseph Dweba**; (South Africa) JJ Kotze; (South Africa) **Scarra Ntubeni**; (South Africa) Chad Solomon; (South Africa) **Andre-Hugo Venter**; **Locks**: (South Africa) **Ben-Jason Dixon**; (South Africa) Connor Evans; (South Africa) **Salmaan Moerat** (c); (South Africa) Gary Porter; (South Africa) JD Schickerling; (South Africa) Dylan Sjoblom; (South Africa) Adré Smith; (South Africa) Ruben van Heerden	**Loose forwards**: (South Africa) Paul de Villiers; (South Africa) Willie Engelbrecht; (Zimbabwe) Dave Ewers; (South Africa) **Deon Fourie**; (South Africa) Keke Morabe; (South Africa) **Evan Roos**; (South Africa) Hendré Stassen; (South Africa) Marcel Theunissen; **Scrum-halves**: (South Africa) Thomas Bursey; (South Africa) Paul de Wet; (South Africa) **Herschel Jantjies**; (South Africa) Imad Khan; (South Africa) Stefan Ungerer; **Fly-halves**: (South Africa) Jean-Luc du Plessis; (South Africa) **Sacha Feinberg-Mngomezulu**; (South Africa) **Manie Libbok**; (South Africa) Jurie Matthee	**Centres**: (South Africa) Dan du Plessis; (South Africa) Ruhan Nel; (South Africa) Wandisile Simelane; **Wingers**: (South Africa) Angelo Davids; (South Africa) Suleiman Hartzenberg; (England) Ben Loader; (South Africa) Seabelo Senatla; (South Africa) **Courtnall Skosan**; (South Africa) Leolin Zas; **Fullbacks**: (South Africa) Clayton Blommetjies; (South Africa) **Warrick Gelant**; (South Africa) Tristan Leyds; (South Africa) **Damian Willemse**
(c) Denotes team captain, **Bold** denotes internationally capped, ^{ST} denotes a short-term signing.

== United Rugby Championship ==
=== Main table ===
Pos	Team	Pld	W	D	L	PF	PA	PD	TF	TA	TB	LB	Pts	Qualification
1	Leinster (CH)	18	16	0	2	542	256	+286	79	35	11	1	76	Qualifies for home URC quarter-final; Qualification for the 2025–26 Champions Cup
2	Bulls (RU)	18	14	0	4	542	361	+181	71	44	9	3	68	Qualifies for home URC quarter-final; Qualification for the 2025–26 Champions Cup
3	Sharks	18	13	0	5	436	402	+34	55	59	7	3	62	Qualifies for home URC quarter-final; Qualification for the 2025–26 Champions Cup
4	Glasgow Warriors	18	11	0	7	468	327	+141	70	40	10	5	59	Qualifies for home URC quarter-final; Qualification for the 2025–26 Champions Cup
5	Stormers	18	10	0	8	507	418	+89	66	57	11	4	55	Qualifies for URC quarter-final; Qualification for the 2025–26 Champions Cup
6	Munster	18	9	0	9	444	429	+15	67	59	11	4	51	Qualifies for URC quarter-final; Qualification for the 2025–26 Champions Cup
7	Edinburgh	18	8	1	9	471	407	+64	66	57	9	6	49	Qualifies for URC quarter-final; Qualification for the 2025–26 Champions Cup
8	Scarlets	18	9	1	8	427	382	+45	50	52	6	4	48	Qualifies for URC quarter-final; Qualification for the 2025–26 Champions Cup
9	Cardiff	18	8	1	9	409	477	−68	63	65	10	3	47	Qualification for the 2025–26 Challenge Cup
10	Benetton	18	9	1	8	393	478	−85	50	65	7	1	46	Qualification for the 2025–26 Challenge Cup
11	Lions	18	8	0	10	402	440	−38	53	60	5	3	40	Qualification for the 2025–26 Challenge Cup
12	Ospreys	18	7	1	10	437	454	−17	60	63	6	4	40	Qualification for the 2025–26 Challenge Cup
13	Connacht	18	6	0	12	420	472	−52	64	62	9	6	39	Qualification for the 2025–26 Challenge Cup
14	Ulster	18	7	0	11	414	506	−92	59	72	5	5	38	Qualification for the 2025–26 Challenge Cup
15	Zebre Parma	18	5	1	12	302	503	−201	38	72	3	4	29	Qualification for the 2025–26 Challenge Cup
16	Dragons	18	1	0	17	335	637	−302	43	92	1	4	9	Qualification for the 2025–26 Challenge Cup

Source: UnitedRugby.com
Rules for classification: Tiebreakers for teams tied on points: 1) Number of matches won 2) The difference between points for and points against 3) The number of tries scored 4) The most points scored 5) The difference between tries for and tries against 6) The fewest red cards received 7) The fewest yellow cards received.

=== Round 1 ===
8 February 2025	(2 BP) Stormers (South Africa)	32–33	(South Africa) Bulls (1 BP)	Cape Town Stadium, Cape Town
13:00				Attendance: 47,171

=== Round 2 ===
28 September 2024	(1 BP) Ospreys (Wales)	37–24	(South Africa) Stormers	Brewery Field. Bridgend
19:35	Try: J. Morgan 25' c Morgan-Williams48' c Edwards 64' c Penalty try 80'; Con: Edwards (3/3) 26', 49', 65'; Pen: Edwards (2) 8', 36'; Drop: Edwards 52'		Try: Zas 5' c Schickerling 70' m Con: Matthee (1/2) 6'; Pen: Matthee (3/3) 11', 22', 41'; Drop: Willemse 44'	Attendance: 3,781; Referee: Andrew Brace (Ireland)

=== Round 3 ===
5 October 2024	Zebre Parma (Italy)	5–36	(South Africa) Stormers (1 BP)	Stadio Sergio Lanfranchi, Parma
20:35	Try: Gesi 75' m		Try: Zas 40' c, 72' m Hartzenberg 59' m Davids 78'; Con: Matthee 41'; Willemse 79'; Pen: Matthee (4) 2', 23', 27', 43'	Attendance: 1,867; Referee: Chris Busby (Ireland)

=== Round 4 ===
12 October 2024	(1 BP) Edinburgh (Scotland)	38–7	(South Africa) Stormers	Hive Stadium, Edinburgh
17:15	Try: Harrison 18' c Muncaster (2) 21' c, 79' c Graham 58' c Gilchrist 62' c Con: Thompson (4/4) 19', 22', 58', 63'; C. Scott (1/1) 80'; Pen: Thompson (1) 74'		Try: Nel 31' c Con: Willemse 32' (1/1)	Attendance: 6,914; Referee: Ben Whitehouse (Wales)

=== Round 5 ===
19 October 2024	Stormers (South Africa)	34–19	(Ireland) Munster	Cape Town Stadium, Cape Town
18:00	Try: Hartzenberg 5' c Theunissen 33' c R. Nel (2) 46' c, 80'+2; Con: Willemse (4/4) 6', 34', 47', 80'+3; Pen: Willemse 75'; Drop: Willemse 76'		Try: Farrell 17 c' Clarke 26' m Coombes 67' c Con: Crowley (2/3) 19', 68'	Attendance: 28,013; Referee: Mike Adamson, Scotland

=== Round 6 ===
26 October 2024	Stormers (South Africa)	17–28	(Scotland) Glasgow Warriors (1 BP)	Danie Craven Stadium, Stellenbosch
13:45	Try: Willemse 33' c du Plessis 54' c Con: Libbok (2/2) 34', 55'; Pen: Libbok 63'		Try: Matthews 37' c Tuipulotu 47' c Rowe 63' c Venter 70' c Con: Hastings (2/2) 38', 48'; Jordan (2/2) 65', 72'	Attendance: 12,976; Referee: Andrew Brace, Ireland

=== Round 7 ===
30 November 2024	Sharks (South Africa)	21–15	(South Africa) Stormers (1 BP)	Kings Park Stadium, Durban
16:00	Try: Hooker 11' c Kolisi 16' c Esterhuizen 58' c Con: Masuku (2/2) 12', 17'; Jo. Hendrikse (1/1) 60'		Try: Zas 44' m penalty try 79'; Drop: Feinberg-Mngomezulu 24'	Attendance: 33,744; Referee: Marius van der Westhuizen (South Africa)

=== Round 8 ===
21 December 2024	'(1 BP)' Stormers (South Africa)	29–10	(South Africa) Lions	Cape Town Stadium, Cape Town
15:45	Try: Dweba 12' m Hartzenberg 24' m Dweba 33' m Zas 47' c Fouché 75' c Con: Libbok (2/5) 48', 76'	Report	Try: van der Merwe 43' m Marais 63' m	Attendance: 22,410

=== Round 9 ===
28 December 2024	'(1 BP)' Stormers (South Africa)	24-20	(South Africa) Sharks (1 BP)	Cape Town Stadium, Cape Town
17:00	Try: Senatla 09' m Fourie 53' m Libbok 66' c J. du Plessis 77' c Con: Libbok (2/4) 68', 79'	Report	Try: Penxe 32' c Jo. Hendrikse 70' c Con: Jo. Hendrikse (2/2) 33', 72'; Pen: Jo. Hendrikse (2) 05', 74'	Attendance: 46,002; Referee: Aimee Bsrrett-Theron

=== Round 10 ===
25 January 2025	Leinster (Ireland)	36–12	(South Africa) Stormers	Aviva Stadium, Dublin
17:00	Try: A. Osbourne (2) 10' c, 67' c Sheehan (2) 40' m, 61' c Barrett 57' c Con: R. Byrne (4/5) 11', 58', 62', 68'; Pen: R. Byrne 3'		Try: Loader 20' c Roos 78' m Con: Libbok (1/1) 21'	Attendance: 18,892

=== Round 11 ===
15 February 2025	Lions (South Africa)	30–23	(South Africa) Stormers (1 BP)	Ellis Park Stadium, Johannesburg
14:30	Try: van den Berg 19' c van Wyk 22' c Louw 34' c Con: Lombard (3/3) 20', 23', 35'; Pen: Lombard (3/3) 14', 47', 59'	Report	Try: Gelant 44'c Roos 69'c Con: Matthee (2/2) 45', 70'; Pen: Matthee (3/3) 17', 31', 81'

=== Round 12 ===
1 March 2025	(1 BP) Bulls (South Africa)	16–19	(South Africa) Stormers	Loftus Versfeld Stadium, Pretoria
17:00	Try: Vermaak 60' c Con: Kriel (1/1) 61'; Pen: Kriel (3) 5', 24', 26'	Report	Try: Simelane 67' c Con: Matthee (1/1) 68'; Pen: Matthee (4) 1', 15', 32', 37'

=== Round 13 ===
22 March 2025	Scarlets (Wales)	17-29	(South Africa) Stormers (1 BP)	Parc y Scarlets, Llanelli
15:35	Try: Mee, 29'c Nicholas, 47'c Con: Lloyd (2/2); Pen: Lloyd, 58'	[ Report]	Try: Loader, 13'; Fourie, 17'c Zas, 64'c Venter, 78'c Con: Feinberg-Mngomezulu (3/4); Pen: Feinberg-Mngomezulu, '43	Attendance: 5,783; Referee: (Ireland) Eoghan Cross

=== Round 14 ===
28 March 2025	(1 BP) Ulster (Ireland)	38–34	(South Africa) Stormers (2 BP)	Ravenhill Stadium, Belfast
19:35	Try: Baloucoune; Warwick; Murphy; Stockdale; Ward; Moore; Con: Cooney (2); Murphy (2)		Try: Roos (2); Loader; Engelbrecht; Con: Mngomezulu (4); Pen: Mngomezulu (2)	Attendance: 11,672

=== Round 15 ===
19 April 2025	(1 BP)Stormers (South Africa)	34-29	(Ireland) Connacht (2 BP)	Cape Town Stadium, Cape Town
16:00	Try: Feinberg-Mngomezulu, 3', 19', 26'; Roos. 14'; Hartzenberg, 48'; Con: Feinberg-Mngomezulu, 4', 15', 20; Pen: Feinberg-Mngomezulu, 72'		Try: Jennings, 7', 41'; Oliver, 17'; Tierney-Martin, 36'; Murphy, 66'; Con: Carty, 8', 18'	Attendance: 18,211; Referee: Sam Grove-White

=== Round 16 ===
26 April 2025	(1 BP) Stormers (South Africa)	54 – 5	(Italy) Benetton	Cape Town Stadium
18:15	Try: Sandi, 4' du Plessis, 16'; Senatla, 33'; Theuinssen, 43'; Zas, 65' de Villiers, 70'; Feinberg-Mngomezulu, 79'; Con: Feinberg-Mngomezulu, 4', 17', 34', 44', 66', 80'; Pen: Feinberg-Mngomezulu, 10', 20'; Drop: Feinberg-Mngomezulu, 14'	Report, [ 2]	Try: Umaga, 41'	Attendance: 18,474; Referee: Adam Jones

=== Round 17 ===
10 May 2025	(1 BP) Stormers (South Africa)	48–12	(Wales) Dragons	Cape Town Stadium
18:15	Try: Simelane, 2', 80'; Senatla, 36'; Ungerer, 50', Willemse, 56'; Hartzenberg, 73' de Wet, 78'; Con: Feinberg-Mngomezulu, 2', 37', 57'; Willemse, 74', 79; Pen: Feinberg-Mngomezulu, 48'; Cards: Moerat, (yellow card) 40' to 50'	Report	Try: Wainwright, 44'; Blacker, 71'; Con: Evans, 71'	Attendance: 13,864

=== Round 18 ===
16 May 2025	(1 BP) Stormers (South Africa)	34–24	(Wales) Cardiff (1 BP)	Cape Town Stadium
19:00	Try: Zas, 10', 33'; Hartzenberg, 25', 47'; Evans, 72'; Con: Willemse, 25', 34'; Feinberg-Mngomezulu, 73'; Pen: Feinberg-Mngomezulu, 80'; Cards: Willemse, (red card) 59'	Report	Try: Southworth, 14'; Hamer-Webb, 37'; Millard, 57'; Hughes, 77'; Con: Sheedy, 15', 78'; Cards: Southworth, (red card) 29'	Attendance: 19,256

=== Play-offs ===
Quarter-finals
1	(Ireland) Leinster	33
8	(Wales) Scarlets	21
4	(Scotland) Glasgow Warriors	36
5	(South Africa) Stormers	18
3	(South Africa) Sharks	24 ^{(6)}
6	(Ireland) Munster	24 ^{(4)}
2	(South Africa) Bulls	42
7	(Scotland) Edinburgh	33

Semi-finals
1	(Ireland) Leinster	37
4	(Scotland) Glasgow Warriors	19
2	(South Africa) Bulls	25
3	(South Africa) Sharks	13

Final
1	(Ireland) Leinster	32
2	(South Africa) Bulls	7

==== Quarter-final ====
30 May 2025	Glasgow Warriors (Scotland)	36–18	Stormers (South Africa)	Scotstoun Stadium, Glasgow
7:35pm	Try: Darge, 10'; Rowe, 15', 46'; Venter, 28'; Horne, 52'; Con: Horne, 11', 16', 47', 53'; Pen: Horne, 56'	Report. 2	Try: Senatla, 26', 43'; Con: Feinberg-Mngomezulu, 27'; Pen: Feinberg-Mngomezulu, 7', 19'; Cards: Senatla (yellow card) 9' to 19'	Attendance: 6,867

Stormers are eliminated from the Championship.

== URC South African Shield ==
2024–25 United Rugby Championship Regional Shield Pools
(South Africa) South African Shield
	Team	P	W	D	L	PF	PA	PD	TF	TA	TBP	LBP	Pts	Pos overall
1	(South Africa) Sharks (S)	6	4	0	2	129	135	−6	17	20	2	1	19	3
2	(South Africa) Stormers	6	3	0	3	142	130	+12	19	15	3	3	18	5
3	(South Africa) Bulls	6	3	0	3	151	141	+10	19	17	3	2	17	2
4	(South Africa) Lions	6	2	0	4	141	157	−16	19	22	1	1	10	11
If teams are level at any stage, tiebreakers are applied in the following order: 1. number of matches won 2. the difference between points for and points against 3. the number of tries scored 4. the most points scored 5. the difference between tries for and tries against 6. the fewest red cards received 7. the fewest yellow cards received
Green background indicates teams currently leading the regional shield. Upon the conclusion of the regular season, these teams win their respective regional shields. (S) : URC Shield champion

== European competition ==
European Rugby Champions Cup Pool 4
Pos	Team	Pld	W	D	L	PF	PA	PD	TF	TA	TB	LB	Pts	Qualification
1	(France) Toulon (4)	4	3	0	1	94	94	0	12	14	1	0	13	Home Champions Cup round of 16
2	(Scotland) Glasgow Warriors (7)	4	2	0	2	103	92	+11	16	12	3	1	12	Home Champions Cup round of 16
3	(England) Sale Sharks (12)	4	2	0	2	81	92	−11	12	14	2	0	10	Away Champions Cup round of 16
4	(England) Harlequins (15)	4	2	0	2	110	79	+31	16	10	1	0	9	Away Champions Cup round of 16
5	(France) Racing 92 (9CC)	4	2	0	2	80	92	−12	12	14	1	0	9	Away Challenge Cup round of 16
6	(South Africa) Stormers	4	1	0	3	92	108	−16	12	16	1	0	5	

Source: EPCR
Rules for classification: Tiebreakers for teams tied on points: 1) Number of matches won; 2) Difference between points for and against; 3) Total number of points for; 4) Aggregate number of points scored in matches between tied teams; 5) Number of matches won excluding the first match, then the second and so on until the tie is settled.

Pool matches

Stormers were eliminated from European competition in the pool stages, finishing bottom of their group.

=== Round 1 ===
7 December 2024	Stormers (South Africa)	14–24	(France) Toulon	Nelson Mandela Bay Stadium, Gqeberha
15:15	Try: Gelant 14' c Dweba 39' c Con: Libbok (2/2) 15', 40'	Report	Try: Villière 4' c Isa 58' c Serin 64' c Con: Serin (3/3) 5', 59', 65'; Pen: Serin (1/1) 11'	Attendance: 27,000; Referee: Karl Dickson (England)

=== Round 2 ===
14 December 2024	(1 BP) Harlequins (England)	53–16	(South Africa) Stormers	Twickenham Stoop, London
20:00	Try: Murley (3) 12' m, 64' m, 66' c Care 29' c Dombrandt (3) 36' c, 52' c, 57' m Riley 75' c Con: Smith (3/6) 30', 37', 53'; J. Evans (2/2) 67', 76'; Pen: Smith (1/1) 46'	Report	Try: Mars 78' c Con: Matthee (1/1) 79'; Pen: Matthee (2/2) 2', 8'; Drop: Matthee (1/2) 48'	Attendance: 10,085; Referee: Ludovic Cayre (France)

=== Round 3 ===
11 January 2025	(1 BP) Stormers (South Africa)	40–0	(England) Sale Sharks	DHL Stadium, Cape Town
13:00	Try: Schickerling 21' c Libbok 25' c Sithole 45' c Gelant 54' m de Wet 63' c Venter 70' c Con: Libbok (4/5) 22', 26', 64', 71'; J.L. du Plessis (1/1) 46'	Report		Attendance: 23,544; Referee: Ludovic Cayre (France)

=== Round 4 ===
18 January 2025	(1 BP) Racing 92 (France)	31–22	(South Africa) Stormers	Paris La Défense Arena, Nanterre
20:00	Try: Habosi (2) 13' c, 36' c Spring (2) 17' m, 55' m Palu 76' c Con: Le Garrec (3/5) 14', 37', 77'	Report	Try: Venter 22' c Jantjies 58' c Theunissen 64' m Con: Matthee (2/3) 22', 59'; Pen: Matthee (1/2) 7'	Attendance: 9,812; Referee: Anthony Woodthorpe (England)

== Home attendance ==
As of 16 May 2025

Domestic League						European Champions Cup						Total	
League	Fixtures	Total Attendance	Average Attendance	Highest	Lowest	League	Fixtures	Total Attendance	Average Attendance	Highest	Lowest	Total Attendance	Average Attendance
2024–25 United Rugby Championship	9	226,377	25,153	47,171	12,976	2024–25 European Rugby Champions Cup	2	50,544	25,272	27,000	23,544	276,221	25,111
