= 1889 South African Rugby Board Trophy =

Domestic rugby union competition

- Countries: South Africa
- Champions: Western Province (1st title)

The 1889 South African Rugby Board Trophy was the first domestic rugby union competition held in South Africa. It took place after the South African Rugby Board was formed in 1889.

The tournament was won by Western Province, while the other competing teams were Eastern Province, Griqualand West and Transvaal.

This was the only time the Board Trophy was played for; in 1891, the Currie Cup was presented to Griqualand West and the competition for that trophy became the main domestic competition in South Africa.

== See also ==
- Currie Cup
