= Johan Ackermann =

South African rugby union coach (born 1970)

- Full name: Johannes Nicolaas Ackermann
- Born: 3 June 1970 (age 56) Benoni, South Africa
- Height: 1.96 m (6 ft 5 in)
- Weight: 115 kg (18 st 2 lb; 254 lb)
- School: Hoërskool Brandwag
- Notable relative: Ruan Ackermann (son)

Rugby union career
- Position: Lock
Senior career
Years	Team	Apps	(Points)
1995–1996	Blue Bulls	45	(15)
1996	Bulls	12	(0)
1999–2001	Golden Lions	31	(20)
2000–2001	Cats	24	(0)
2001–2002	Northampton Saints	4	(0)
2003–2005	Griquas	32	(5)
2004–2008	Sharks	27	(10)
2006–2007	Sharks (Currie Cup)	12	(10)
- Correct as of 25 June 2014
International career
Years	Team	Apps	(Points)
1996–2007	South Africa	13	(0)
- Correct as of 25 June 2014
Coaching career
- Years: Team
- 2013–2016: Golden Lions
- 2013–2017: Lions
- 2017–2020: Gloucester
- 2020–2022: Red Hurricanes
- 2023–2024: Urayasu D-Rocks
- 2025–: Bulls

Johannes Nicolaas 'Johan' Ackermann (born 3 June 1970) is a South African professional rugby union coach and former player. He played as a lock during his playing career between 1995 and 2007. He is currently the head coach at the Bulls.

== Playing career ==
In 2007, Ackermann became the oldest Springbok to play for the national side, at the age of 37, a record since surpassed by Schalk Brits and Victor Matfield. After the 2007 World Cup in France, he was recalled to the Springbok squad to play against the Barbarians. This was his last outing as an international player.

Ackermann bowed out of professional rugby on a winning note on 1 March 2008, when the Sharks defeated the Bulls 29-15 at Loftus Versfeld. He became the oldest player ever in Super Rugby history at age 37 years, 272 days.

== Coaching career ==
Ackermann was the forwards coach of the Lions in Super Rugby under head coach John Mitchell, but after Mitchell left the Union, he took over. He has seen success as coach of the Union including winning the SARU Coach of the Year award in 2014, his first year as head coach. He took over as head coach of the Lions Super Rugby and the Golden Lions Currie Cup sides in 2013.

He was appointed as the head coach of English Premiership side Gloucester prior to the 2017–18 season.

He left Gloucester at the end of June 2020 to become head coach at Japanese side Red Hurricanes He was replaced at Gloucester by George Skivington.

On July 16, 2025, he was announced as the new head coach for the Vodacom Bulls.

== Personal ==
Ackerman is married, with two sons and a daughter. He is a strong Christian.

== See also ==
- List of sportspeople sanctioned for doping offences
