= Cornel Smit =

South African rugby union player

- Full name: Cornel Smit
- Born: 10 September 1997 (age 29) South Africa
- Height: 1.84 m (6 ft 1/2 in)
- Weight: 93 kg (205 lb)
- School: Bishop's College

Rugby union career
- Position: Centre
- Current team: Stormers / Western Province
Senior career
Years	Team	Apps	(Points)
2018–2019	Western Province	5	(10)
2020–	Stormers	3	(0)
2020–	Western Province	17	(23)
- Correct as of 23 July 2022

Cornel Smit (born 10 September 1997) is a South African rugby union player for the Western Province in the Currie Cup and the Stormers in the Pro14 Rainbow Cup SA. His regular position is centre.

Smit was named in the Stormers squad for the Super Rugby Unlocked campaign. He made his debut for Stormers in Round 2 of the Pro14 Rainbow Cup SA against the Bulls.
