= Paul de Wet =

South African rugby union player

- Full name: Albertus Paul de Wet
- Born: 16 March 1996 (age 30) Stellenbosch, South Africa
- Height: 1.76 m (5 ft 9 1/2 in)
- Weight: 80 kg (180 lb; 12 st 8 lb)
- School: Paarl Boys' High School
- University: University of Stellenbosch

Rugby union career
- Position: Scrum-half
- Current team: Stormers / Western Province
Youth career
- 2015–2017: Western Province
Senior career
Years	Team	Apps	(Points)
2017–2025	Western Province	29	(40)
2018–2025	Stormers	86	(70)
2025–present	Bulls	17	(20)
- Correct as of 30 Sempember 2026

Albertus Paul de Wet (born 16 March 1996) is a South African rugby union player for the Bulls in the United Rugby Championship and Western Province in the Currie Cup and in the Rugby Challenge. His regular position is scrum-half.
