= Louw Nel =

South African rugby union player

- Born: 9 August 2002 (age 24) Panorama, South Africa
- Height: 190 cm (6 ft 3 in)
- Weight: 107 kg (236 lb; 16 st 12 lb)
- School: Paarl Gimnasium

Rugby union career
- Position: Flanker
- Current team: Stormers / Western Province
Senior career
Years	Team	Apps	(Points)
2023–	Western Province	11	(0)
2024–	Stormers	8	(0)
- Correct as of 5 May 2025
International career
Years	Team	Apps	(Points)
2022	South Africa U20	5	(10)
- Correct as of 5 May 2025

Louw Nel (born 9 August 2002) is a South African rugby union player, who plays for the Stormers and Western Province. His preferred position is flanker.

== Early career ==
Nel attended Paarl Gimnasium where he earned selection for Western Province U18s in 2019. In 2022, he earned selection for the South Africa U20 side taking part in the Summer Series, where his performances earned him a contract extension.

== Professional career ==
Nel made his professional debut for Western Province in the 2023 Currie Cup Premier Division, He made his debut for the Stormers in October 2024, and has gone on to make8 appearances for the side.
