= Vernon Matongo =

Zimbabwean rugby union player

- Born: 28 February 2002 (age 24) Harare, Zimbabwe
- Height: 181 cm (5 ft 11 in)
- Weight: 117 kg (258 lb; 18 st 6 lb)
- School: Northwood School
- University: Stellenbosch University

Rugby union career
- Position: Prop
- Current team: Stormers / Western Province
Senior career
Years	Team	Apps	(Points)
2024–	Western Province		
2024–	Stormers	11	(0)
- Correct as of 26 October 2025

Vernon Matongo (born 28 February 2002) is a Zimbabwean rugby union player, who plays for the Stormers and Western Province. His preferred position is prop.

== Early career ==
Matongo attended Northwood School where he was Head Prefect and played rugby. After leaving school, he attended Stellenbosch University where he played for the Maties side.

== Professional career ==
Matongo was originally a member of the Sharks academy having joined after leaving school in Durban. Having attended university in the area, he joined the Stormers, making his debut in the Currie Cup for the Western Province in 2024. He made his debut for the Stormers in the 2024–25 European Rugby Champions Cup.
