= Lukhanyo Vokozela =

South African rugby union player

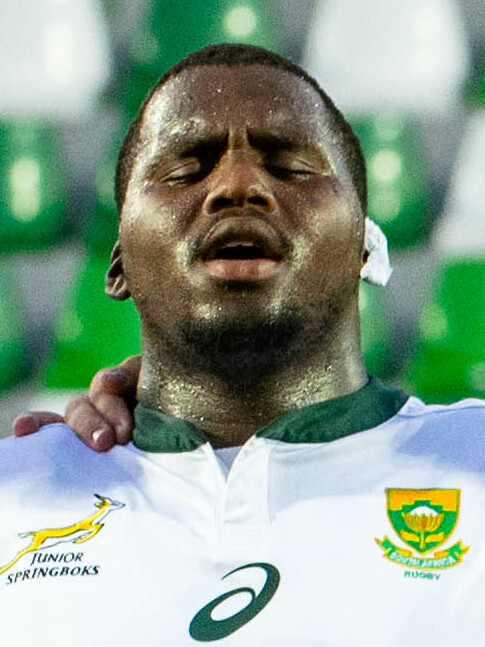
- Born: 5 February 2002 (age 24) Khayelitsha, South Africa
- Height: 175 cm (5 ft 9 in)
- Weight: 108 kg (238 lb; 17 st 0 lb)

Rugby union career
- Position: Hooker
Senior career
Years	Team	Apps	(Points)
2022–	Western Province	10	(0)
2025–	Stormers	5	(0)
- Correct as of 24 October 2026
International career
Years	Team	Apps	(Points)
2022	South Africa U20	4	(10)
- Correct as of 03 January 2026

Lukhanyo Vokozela (born 5 February 2002) is a South African rugby union player for the Western Province in the Currie Cup. His regular position is hooker.

Vokozela was named in the Western Province side for the 2022 Currie Cup Premier Division. He made his Currie Cup debut for the Western Province against the Free State Cheetahs in Round 6 of the 2022 Currie Cup Premier Division.

== Early life and background ==
Lukhanyo Vokozela, commonly known as "Boepa," hails from Khayelitsha, a so-called "non-traditional rugby area" in South Africa. Despite the enduring inequalities and numerous challenges prevalent in the country, Vokozela's talent and determination set him apart. He was part of the initial intake of the Connect Academy, an organization dedicated to nurturing and developing talent in underrepresented communities of Cape Town. Vokozela displayed remarkable potential from an early age, joining the academy at under 13. His physicality and speed, along with his strong personality, caught the attention of the academy's founder, Murray Ingram.

== Rugby career ==
Vokozela's rugby journey is marked by significant milestones that reflect his growing prowess in the sport. He made his debut for Western Province against the Cheetahs in the 2022 Currie Cup Premier Division, a testament to his hard work and dedication. Prior to this, he had attended Rondebosch Boys High School in Cape Town and played for Western Province at age-group levels. Vokozela also participated in the SARU Under 18 Elite Player Development Camp and was selected for the SA Schools A side, playing against international teams like Wales and Argentina in 2019. He was a key player in the Western Province side that won the Craven Week, beating the Bulls in Bloemfontein.
