= Ben Loader =

English rugby union player

- Born: Benjamin Edimesumbe Loader; 8 November 1998 (age 28) Reading, England
- Height: 1.88 m (6 ft 2 in)
- Weight: 92 kg (14 st 7 lb; 203 lb)

Rugby union career
- Position: Wing/Fullback
- Current team: Gloucester
Senior career
Years	Team	Apps	(Points)
2017–2023	London Irish	75	(120)
2023–2025	Stormers	21	(35)
2025–	Gloucester	0	(0)
- Correct as of 30 January 2025
International career
Years	Team	Apps	(Points)
2016–2017	England U18s	6	(5)
2018	England U20s	4	(20)
2019	England XV	1	(0)
- Correct as of 2 June 2019

Benjamin Edimesumbe Loader (born 8 November 1998) is an English professional rugby union player who plays as a wing for Gloucester in the Premiership Rugby.

== Career ==
Loader began playing rugby union at local club Reading Abbey. At the age of fifteen, he joined the academy of London Irish and on 14 October 2017 made his professional debut in a EPCR Challenge Cup game against Edinburgh.

Loader represented England during the 2018 Six Nations Under 20s Championship and scored a try in the last round against Ireland. Later that year, Loader was a member of the squad that finished runners up at the 2018 World Rugby Under 20 Championship. On 2 June 2019, he made an appearance for an England XV side in a non-cap friendly against the Barbarians at Twickenham Stadium.

In May 2022, Loader came off the bench as London Irish were defeated by Worcester Warriors in the final of the Premiership Rugby Cup. The following year saw Loader depart the club after they encountered financial issues. In June 2023, it was confirmed that he had joined Stormers.

In February 2025, Premiership side Gloucester announced they had signed Loader from the Stormers ahead of the following season.

== Personal life ==
Born in England, Loader is of Cameroonian descent through his mother. He was educated at Reading School and Wellington College. His younger brother, Danny Namaso, is a professional footballer.
