= Jonathan Roche =

South African rugby union player

- Full name: Jonathan Roche
- School: Bishops
- University: UCT(University of Cape Town)

Rugby union career
- Position: Centre
Senior career
Years	Team	Apps	(Points)
2022	Western Province	1	(0)
- Correct as of 23 July 2022

Jonathan Roche is a South African rugby union player for the Western Province in the Currie Cup. His regular position is centre.

Roche was named in the Western Province side for the 2022 Currie Cup Premier Division. He made his Currie Cup debut for the Western Province against the Sharks in Round 14 of the 2022 Currie Cup Premier Division.
