= Ruan Ackermann =

South African rugby union player

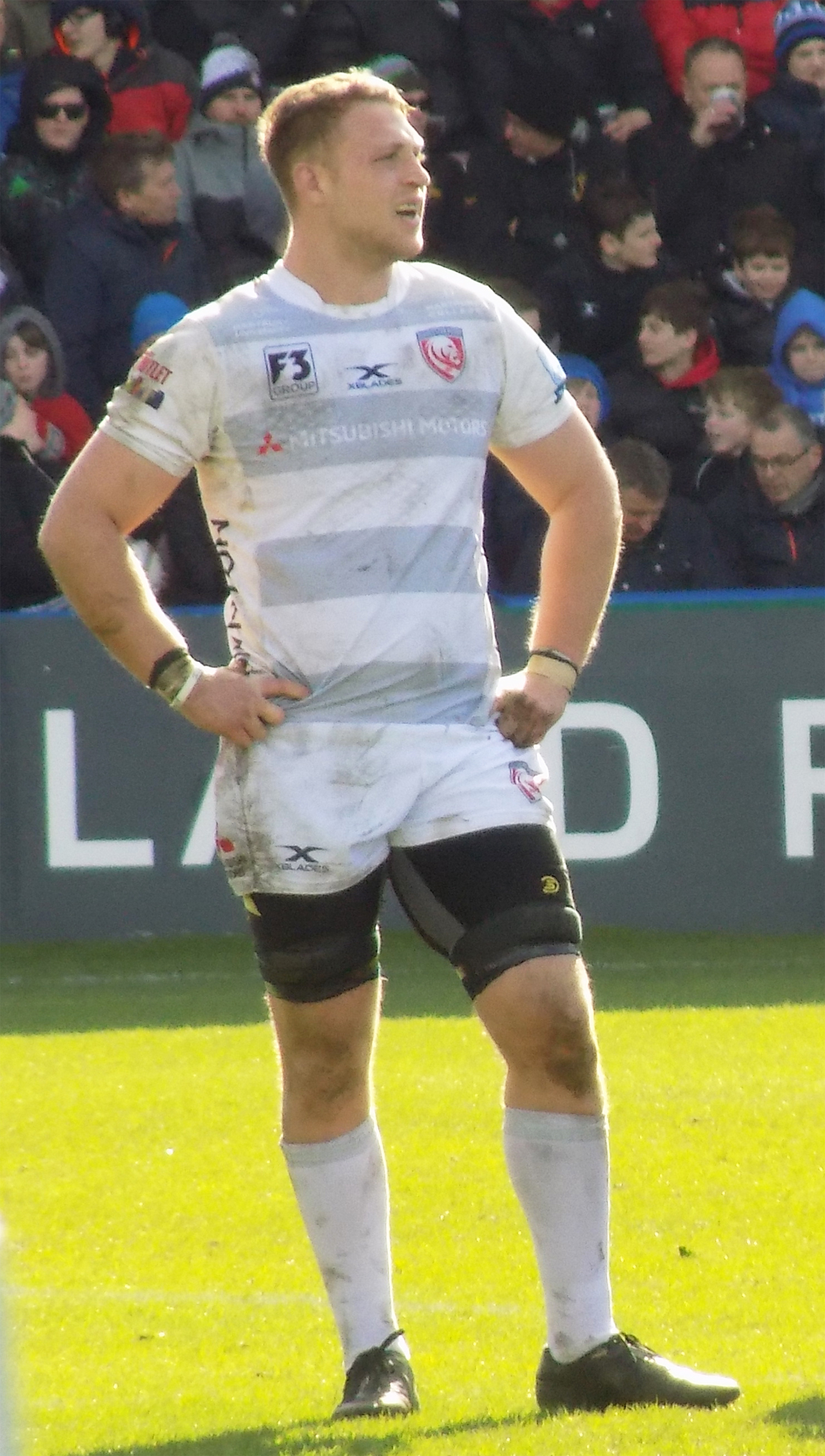
- Ruan Ackermann, 2019
- Born: 29 December 1995 (age 30) Pretoria, South Africa
- Height: 1.94 m (6 ft 4 1/2 in)
- Weight: 115 kg (18.1 st; 254 lb)
- School: Hoërskool Garsfontein
- Notable relative: Johan Ackermann (father)

Rugby union career
- Position: Flanker/Number 8
Youth career
- 2014–2017: Golden Lions
Senior career
Years	Team	Apps	(Points)
2015–2017	Golden Lions XV	8	(10)
2016–2017	Lions	33	(30)
2016–2017	Golden Lions	9	(5)
2017–2025	Gloucester	172	(115)
2025–	Stormers	0	(0)
- Correct as of 8 August 2025
International career
Years	Team	Apps	(Points)
2016–2017	Barbarians	4	(0)
2017	South Africa 'A'	2	(0)
- Correct as of 16 April 2018

Ruan Ackermann (born 29 December 1995) is a South African professional rugby union player, currently playing in the United Rugby Championship with Stormers. His regular position is flanker.

== Club career ==
=== 2012–2014 : Early career ===
Ackermann played high school rugby for Hoërskool Garsfontein, where he featured for their first XV from 2012 to 2014, also captaining them in 2014, where he helped them reach the final of the Beeld Trophy. He didn't represent the Blue Bulls at Craven Week level and was instead contracted by Johannesburg-based side the Golden Lions to join their academy from 2015.

Despite still being at school, he was included in the Golden Lions U19 squad during the 2014 Under-19 Provincial Championship and was named on the bench for three of their matches. He played off the bench on all three occasions and marked his debut – a Round Ten match against Western Province U19 in Johannesburg – by scoring a try in a 28–8 victory.

=== 2015 : Vodacom Cup and Under-21 ===
Ackermann was named in the Golden Lions squad for the 2015 Vodacom Cup. He made his first class debut by starting their opening match of the campaign, a 53–3 victory over the Welwitschias in Windhoek. He played off the bench in their regular season matches against the Blue Bulls, Leopards and the Griffons in Welkom, a match that also saw Ackermann score his first senior try in a 36–20 victory. The Golden Lions finished top of the Northern Section, winning all seven of their matches to qualify for the Quarter Finals. Ackermann played off the bench in a 29–21 victory over the SWD Eagles in their quarter final match and started their semi-final match against the Pumas, which the side from Nelspruit won 43–20 to eliminate the Golden Lions from the competition.

Ackermann was named in a 37-man South Africa Under-20 training squad in March 2015, but missed out on selection for their final squad for the 2015 World Rugby Under 20 Championship.

He made six appearances for the Golden Lions U21 team during the 2015 Under-21 Provincial Championship Group A, scoring a try in his side's 17–30 defeat to the Free State U21s as they finished in fourth position on the log to qualify for the semi-finals, but didn't feature in the semi-final match which was won 43–20 by eventual champions Western Province U21.

=== 2016–2017 : Golden Lions/Lions ===
In December 2015, Ackermann was included in the 55-man Lions squad that prepared for the 2016 Super Rugby season and he also made the cut for a 27-man squad for their tour to Japan and New Zealand for matches against the Sunwolves, Chiefs and Highlanders. He was named on the bench for their opening match against the Sunwolves.

=== 2017-2025 : Gloucester ===
In August 2017, Gloucester Rugby announced the signing of Ackermann, whose father Johan had recently joined as head coach.

=== 2025: Stormers ===
On 24 June 2025, after 8 seasons at Gloucester, Ackermann will return to South Africa to join rivals Stormers in the URC competition ahead of the 2025-26 season.

== International career ==
Ackermann played for the Barbarians against South Africa XV in a non-cap friendly, held at the Wembley Stadium in London, England. He also played against Fiji, Czech Republic and New Zealand XV in non-cap friendlies.

He was included in the South Africa 'A' side in a two-test series against French Barbarians, also coached under his father, Johan Ackermann.

== Personal life ==
He is the son of Johan Ackermann, a former provincial rugby player who also made thirteen appearances for the South African national team. After finishing his playing career, Johan Ackermann became a coach at the Golden Lions Currie Cup side and the Lions Super Rugby side.

Ackermann got married June 2022 to Kirsty. The pair met through his brother who got her number for him. Ackermann had been recovering from an injury and the couple began getting closer.
