= Sazi Sandi =

South African rugby union player

- Full name: Sazi Sandi
- Born: 11 August 1998 (age 28) East London, South Africa
- Height: 1.81 m (5 ft 11 1/2 in)
- Weight: 125 kg (276 lb)

Rugby union career
- Position: Prop
- Current team: Stormers / Western Province
Senior career
Years	Team	Apps	(Points)
2019–	Western Province	18	(5)
2020–	Stormers	10	(0)
- Correct as of 23 July 2022

Sazi Sandi (born 11 August 1998) is a South African rugby union player for the Stormers in Super Rugby. His regular position is prop.

Sandi was named in the Stormers squad for the 2020 Super Rugby season. He made his debut for the Stormers in Round 6 of Super Rugby Unlocked against the Cheetahs.
