= Connor Evans (rugby union) =

South African rugby union player

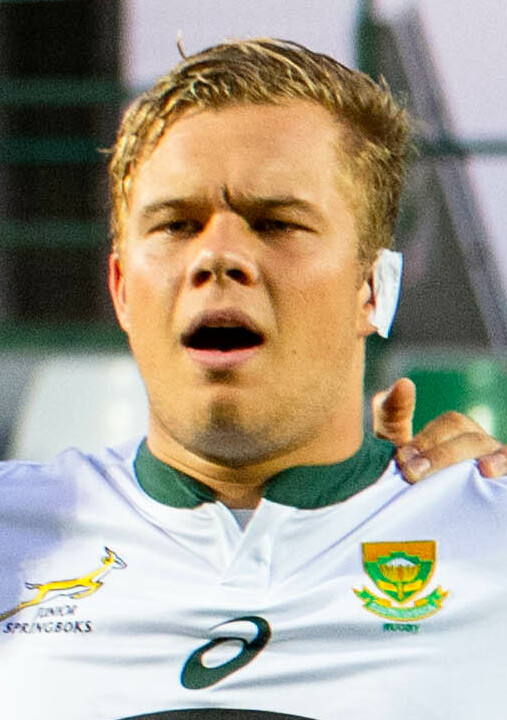
- Full name: Connor Evans
- Born: 24 January 2002 (age 24) Cape Town, South Africa
- Height: 1.98 m (6 ft 6 in)
- Weight: 112 kg (17 st 9 lb; 247 lb)
- School: Bishops Diocesan College
- University: University of Cape Town

Rugby union career
- Position: Lock
- Current team: Western Province
Senior career
Years	Team	Apps	(Points)
2021–	Western Province	8	(0)
2022–	Stormers	1	(0)
- Correct as of 23 July 2022

Connor Evans (born 24 January 2002) is a South African rugby union player for the Western Province in the Currie Cup. His regular position is lock.

Evans was named in the Western Province side for the 2022 Currie Cup Premier Division. He made his Currie Cup debut for the Western Province against the Golden Lions in Round 1 of the 2022 Currie Cup Premier Division.
