= Evan Roos =

South African rugby union player

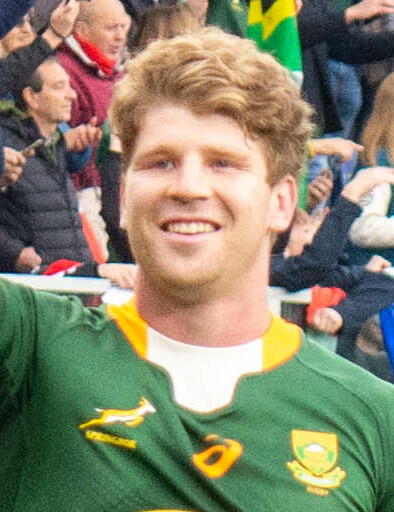
- Roos playing in 2022
- Born: 21 January 2000 (age 26) Pretoria, South Africa
- Height: 1.91 m (6 ft 3 in)
- Weight: 109 kg (240 lb)
- School: Midstream College; Paarl Boys' High School

Rugby union career
- Position: Flank / Eighth man / Lock
- Current team: Stormers / Western Province
Senior career
Years	Team	Apps	(Points)
2019–2021	Sharks (Currie Cup)	2	(0)
2020	Sharks	0	(0)
2020–	Stormers	86	(185)
2021–	Western Province	10	(40)
- Correct as of 23 July 2022
International career
Years	Team	Apps	(Points)
2018	South Africa Schools	3	(5)
2022–	South Africa	10	(5)
- Correct as of 23 July 2022

Evan Roos (born 21 January 2000) is a South African professional rugby union player for Western Province in the Currie Cup and the Stormers in the United Rugby Championship. He can play as a flank, eighth man or lock.

Roos was called up to the South Africa Schools squad in 2018, making three appearances in the 2018 Under-19 International Series, and scoring a try in their match against France.

Roos made his Currie Cup debut for the Sharks in August 2019, coming on as a replacement in their match against the Free State Cheetahs in Round Five of the 2019 season.

Evan made his Springbok debut on 9 July 2022, against Wales, and started in the number 8 jersey. He is Springbok #924.

He joined the Stormers in early 2021. In 2024 he signed a contract extension with the Stormers that will keep him in Cape Town until at least 2027.

== Statistics ==
=== Test match record ===
As of 11 July 2026

Opponent	P	W	D	L	Try	Pts	%Won
Argentina	1	1	0	0	0	0	100
Australia	1	1	0	0	0	0	100
England	1	1	0	0	0	0	100
Italy	2	2	0	0	0	0	100
Portugal	1	1	0	0	0	0	100
Scotland	1	1	0	0	1	5	100
Wales	2	1	0	1	0	0	50
Total	9	8	0	1	1	5	88.89

=== International tries ===
As of 11 July 2026

Try	Opposing team	Location	Venue	Competition	Date	Result	Score
1	Scotland	Pretoria, South Africa	Loftus Versfeld Stadium	2026 Nations Championship	11 July 2025	Win	42–28
