= Wandisile Simelane =

South African rugby player (born 1998)

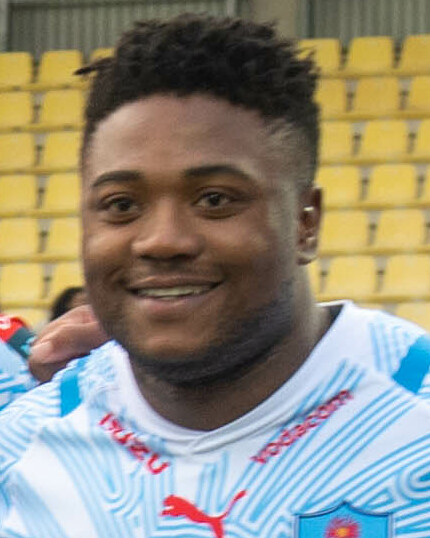
- Born: 21 March 1998 (age 28) Johannesburg, South Africa
- Height: 1.79 m (5 ft 10 1/2 in)
- Weight: 95 kg (209 lb; 14 st 13 lb)
- School: Jeppe High School for Boys

Rugby union career
- Position: Centre / Wing
- Current team: Stormers / Western Province
Youth career
- 2011–2019: Golden Lions
Senior career
Years	Team	Apps	(Points)
2018–2019	Golden Lions XV	5	(5)
2018–2022	Golden Lions	31	(25)
2019–2022	Lions	30	(30)
2022–	Stormers	15	(5)
2023–	Western Province	0	(0)
- Correct as of 1 March 2025
International career
Years	Team	Apps	(Points)
2015–2016	South Africa U18	5	(5)
2017–2018	South Africa U-20	10	(40)
- Correct as of 5 June 2021

Wandisile Simelane (born 21 March 1998) is a South African professional rugby union player who plays for the Stormers in the United Rugby Championship, and Western Province in the Currie Cup. His regular position is centre or wing.

He has also played for the Junior Springboks.
