= JD Schickerling =

South African rugby union player

- Full name: John Dave Schickerling
- Born: 9 May 1995 (age 31) Calvinia, South Africa
- Height: 2.03 m (6 ft 8 in)
- Weight: 119 kg (18 st 10 lb; 262 lb)
- School: Paarl Gimnasium

Rugby union career
- Position: Lock
- Current team: Stormers
Youth career
- 2012–2016: Western Province
Senior career
Years	Team	Apps	(Points)
2014–2021	Western Province	49	(30)
2016–	Stormers	45	(5)
2021–2023	Kobelco Kobe Steelers	24	(20)
2023–2024	Kubota Spears	13	(15)
- Correct as of 11 November 2021
International career
Years	Team	Apps	(Points)
2012–2013	South Africa Schools	3	(0)
2014	South Africa Under-20	5	(0)
2016	South Africa 'A'	2	(0)
- Correct as of 18 April 2018

John Dave Schickerling (born 9 May 1995 in Calvinia, South Africa) is a South African rugby union player for the Stormers in Super Rugby and Western Province in the Currie Cup and in the Rugby Challenge. He regularly plays as a lock.

== Career ==
=== Youth ===
As a scholar at Paarl Gimnasium, he earned a call-up to the Western Province squad for the 2012 Under-18 Craven Week competition. At the completion of the Craven Week tournament, he was named in the South African Schools side that played a three-match tournament in August 2012. He started all three of South Africa's matches against France, Wales and England, helping South Africa to victories in all three matches.

He was once again named in the South Africa Schools side in 2013, but missed the matches through injury. He recovered to represent the Western Province U19 side during the 2013 Under-19 Provincial Championship, making two appearances.

In 2014, Schickerling was included in the South Africa Under-20 side that participated in the 2014 IRB Junior World Championship. After playing off the bench in their first match of the competition against Scotland, he got promoted to the starting line-up for their remaining pool stage matches against New Zealand and Samoa. He also started their semi-final match as they secured a second victory over New Zealand during the tournament and was also named in the run-on side for the final against England.

=== Western Province ===
He made his first class debut for Western Province during the 2014 Vodacom Cup competition, coming on as a substitute against the Boland Cavaliers.

He returned to action for the Western Province U21 side during the 2014 Under-21 Provincial Championship, but suffered a serious set-back when he sustained a broken neck in their match against the Blue Bulls U21 in Pretoria on 30 August 2014. He was out of the game for thirteen months, but returned to action for Western Province's Under-21s in October 2015 in their match against the Golden Lions U21s in Johannesburg.

=== South Africa 'A' ===
In 2016, Schickerling was included in a South Africa 'A' squad that played a two-match series against a touring England Saxons team. He was named in the starting line-up for their first match in Bloemfontein, but ended on the losing side as the visitors ran out 32–24 winners. He was named on the bench for the second match of the series, coming on as a second-half replacement in a 26–29 defeat to the Saxons in George.
