= Gary Porter (rugby union) =

Zimbabwe international rugby union player

- Full name: Gary Porter
- Born: 22 July 1996 (age 30) KwaZulu-Natal, South Africa
- Height: 1.98 m (6 ft 6 in)
- Weight: 115 kg (18 st 2 lb; 254 lb)
- School: Michaelhouse
- University: University of Cape Town

Rugby union career
- Position: Lock
- Current team: Stormers / Western Province
Youth career
- 2016-2021: Ikey Tigers
Senior career
Years	Team	Apps	(Points)
2018	Western Province	5	(0)
2021–2022	Ealing Trailfinders	6	(0)
2022–	Stormers	19	(0)
International career
Years	Team	Apps	(Points)
2026–	Zimbabwe	7	(5)
- Correct as of 21 November 2026

Gary Porter (born 22 July 1996) is a South African-born Zimbabwean international rugby union player, who plays club rugby for the Stormers in the United Rugby Championship. His regular position is lock.

Porter was a member of the Ikey Tigers side that was defeated in the final of the 2021 Varsity Cup. He joined the Western Province straight out of school, making one appearance in the 2018 Rugby Challenge. In 2021, he joined Ealing Trailfinders, making six appearances for the side in the RFU Championship. He was released by Ealing at the end of the season. In August 2022, it was confirmed he had joined the Stormers ahead of the 2022–23 United Rugby Championship.

On 8 June 2026, Porter was included in the Zimbabwe national rugby squad for the first time, making his debut against South Africa A. He was then selected for Zimbabwe's squad for the inaugural Nations Cup. He made his full Sables debut against Tonga.
