= JJ Kotze =

South African rugby union player

- Full name: Jean-Jacques Kotze
- Born: 6 November 2000 (age 26) South Africa
- Height: 1.87 m (6 ft 1 1/2 in)
- Weight: 106 kg (234 lb)
- School: Paul Roos Gymnasium, Stellenbosch

Rugby union career
- Position: Hooker
- Current team: Stormers / Western Province
Senior career
Years	Team	Apps	(Points)
2021–	Stormers	10	(5)
2021–	Western Province	10	(40)
- Correct as of 23 July 2022

Jean-Jacques Kotze (born 6 November 2000) is a South African rugby union player for the Western Province in the Currie Cup. His regular position is hooker.

Kotze was named in the Western Province squad for the 2021 Currie Cup Premier Division. He made his debut for Western Province in Round 1 of the 2021 Currie Cup Premier Division against Blue Bulls, scoring 4 tries.
