= Neethling Fouché =

South African rugby union player

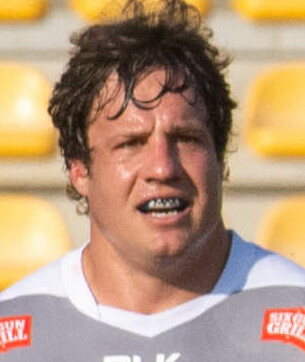
- Fouché in 2022
- Full name: Johann Neethling Fouché
- Born: 10 January 1993 (age 33) Rustenburg, South Africa
- Height: 1.87 m (6 ft 1 1/2 in)
- Weight: 118 kg (18 st 8 lb; 260 lb)
- School: Die Hoërskool Rustenburg, Rustenburg / Grey College, Bloemfontein
- University: University of Pretoria

Rugby union career
- Position: Tighthead prop
- Current team: Stormers / Western Province
Youth career
- 2006–2009: Leopards
- 2010–2011: Free State Cheetahs
- 2012–2014: Blue Bulls
Amateur team(s)
Years	Team	Apps	(Points)
2014–2017	UP Tuks	15	(5)
Senior career
Years	Team	Apps	(Points)
2014	Blue Bulls	1	(0)
2016–2017	Blue Bulls XV	4	(0)
2018–present	Stormers	99	(20)
2018–present	Western Province	33	(10)
2019	Cheetahs	2	(5)
- Correct as of 07 October 2025
International career
Years	Team	Apps	(Points)
2010	South Africa Under-18		
2025	South Africa	1	(0)
2026	South Africa 'A'	1	(0)
- Correct as of 24 June 2026

Johann Neethling Fouché (born 10 January 1993) is a South African rugby union player for the Stormers in the United Rugby Championship and Western Province in the Currie Cup. His regular position is tighthead prop.

== Career ==
=== Youth ===
Fouché first earned his first provincial representation at primary school level, being called up by Rustenburg-based side the Leopards for the 2006 Under-13 Craven Week competition. In 2009, he once again represented the Leopards, this time for their Under-16 Grant Khomo Week side.

In 2010, however, he moved to Bloemfontein to complete his schooling at Grey College in Bloemfontein. His provincial selection continued at his new school and he represented the Free State in the Under-18 Craven Week tournaments in both 2010 and 2011. In 2010, he was included in a South African Under-18 High Performance squad that played matches against France, England and Namibia.

Fouché also made one appearance for the Free State U19 side while still at school, coming on as a replacement in their match against the Blue Bulls U19 in the 2011 Under-19 Provincial Championship.

=== Blue Bulls ===
After two years in Bloemfontein, Fouché was on the move again – this time, he moved to Pretoria to join the Blue Bulls. He appeared in seven of the Blue Bulls U19 side's matches during the 2012 Under-19 Provincial Championship and represented the Blue Bulls U21s on three occasions during the 2013 Under-21 Provincial Championship, playing as a loosehead prop instead of his regular tighthead side.

In 2014, he was included in the UP Tuks side that played in the 2014 Varsity Cup competition, where he made a single appearance for the Pretoria-based university side against eventual champions UCT Ikey Tigers. He made his first class debut two weeks later on 8 March 2014, playing off the bench in the Blue Bulls' 2014 Vodacom Cup First Round match against Griquas, with his side suffering a 24–26 loss. That was his only appearance in the competition and he reverted to the Under-21s for the 2014 Under-21 Provincial Championship, where he played seven times and scored three tries – two in their match against Border U21 in a 143–0 demolition and another in their match against the Sharks. Fouché also started the final of the competition, helping the Blue Bulls to a 20–10 victory over Western Province U21 in Cape Town.

Fouché returned to action for UP Tuks in the 2015 Varsity Cup, starting in their 29–29 draw against UFS Shimlas, before being named as a potential injury replacement for Dayan van der Westhuizen for the Bulls in their opening round of the 2015 Super Rugby season against the Stormers.
