= Marcel Theunissen =

South African rugby union player

- Full name: Marcel Theunissen
- Born: 9 June 1999 (age 27) Bloemfontein, South Africa
- Height: 1.92 m (6 ft 3 1/2 in)
- Weight: 99 kg (218 lb)
- School: Grey College

Rugby union career
- Position(s): Flanker, Number 8
- Current team: Toshiba Brave Lupus
Senior career
Years	Team	Apps	(Points)
2020–2026	Stormers	95	(60)
2020–2026	Western Province	20	(10)
2026–	Toshiba Brave Lupus		
- Correct as of 23 July 2022

Marcel Theunissen (born 9 June 1999) is a South African rugby union player for the Stormers in Super Rugby. His regular position is flanker.

Theunissen was named in the Stormers squad for the Super Rugby Unlocked competition. He made his debut for the Stormers in Round 4 of Super Rugby Unlocked against the Bulls.
