= Keke Morabe =

South African rugby union player

- Full name: Keke Morabe
- Born: 21 April 2001 (age 25) South Africa
- Height: 1.88 m (6 ft 2 in)
- Weight: 103 kg (16 st 3 lb; 227 lb)
- School: Welkom Gimnasium High School

Rugby union career
- Position: Lock / Flanker / Number 8
- Current team: Stormers / Western Province
Senior career
Years	Team	Apps	(Points)
2022–	Western Province	12	(0)
2022–	Stormers		
- Correct as of 16 September 2022

Keke Morabe, born 21 April 2001, in QwaQwa South Africa; is a South African rugby union player for the Western Province in the Currie Cup. His regular position is lock or flanker.

Morabe was named in the Western Province side for the 2022 Currie Cup Premier Division. He made his Currie Cup debut for the Western Province against the Golden Lions in Round 1 of the 2022 Currie Cup Premier Division.
