= Imad Khan =

South African Rugby Player

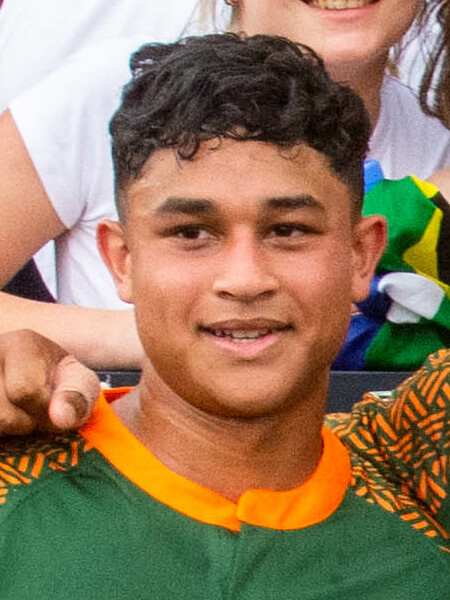
- Born: 2 December 2003 (age 22) Cape Town, South Africa
- Height: 179 cm (5 ft 10 1/2 in)
- Weight: 78 kg (12 st 4 lb; 172 lb)
- School: Bishops Diocesan
- University: University of Cape Town

Rugby union career
- Position: Scrumhalf
- Current team: Stormers
Amateur team(s)
Years	Team	Apps	(Points)
2022-2023	Ikey Tigers		
Senior career
Years	Team	Apps	(Points)
2023-	Stormers	17	(35)
- Correct as of 22 June 2026
International career
Years	Team	Apps	(Points)
2021	South Africa U18		
2022-2023	South Africa U20	9	(16)
2026-	South Africa 'A	5	(1)
- Correct as of 22 June 2026

Imad Khan (born 2 December 2003) is a South African rugby union player who currently plays as a scrum-half for the Western Province Currie Cup team and DHL Stormers.

Khan has also represented SA Schools, Junior Springboks, Western Province rugby, and the UCT Ikey Tigers.

== Early life and education ==
Imad Khan was born on 2 December 2003 in Cape Town, South Africa. He attended Bishops Diocesan College for the entirety of his schooling career. Khan went on to attend the University of Cape Town where he played for the Ikey Tigers Varsity Cup team.

== Rugby career ==
In 2021, Khan was selected to represent the U18 SA Schools team and also represented Bishops Diocesan College at a first team level.

In 2022, Khan was contracted to represent Western Province/Stormers. Imad was also selected to represent and play for the various Western Province rugby age groups throughout the year, namely the U19, U20 and U21 Western Province teams. Imad also represented the UCT Ikey Tigers for the 2022 Varsity Cup rugby tournament.

Khan was further selected to be a part of the Junior Springboks team who won the 2022 U20 Six Nations Summer Series in Italy, where he scored a try against France.

In 2023, Imad made his URC debut for the DHL Stormers against Glasgow and also played for the U20 Western Province team. Following his success at the U20 level, Khan was called up to the Western Province Currie Cup team and made his debut against the Griquas.

John Dobson, DHL Stormers head coach, stated that he believes "Imad Khan is going to be a star of SA rugby".
