= Andre-Hugo Venter =

South African rugby union player

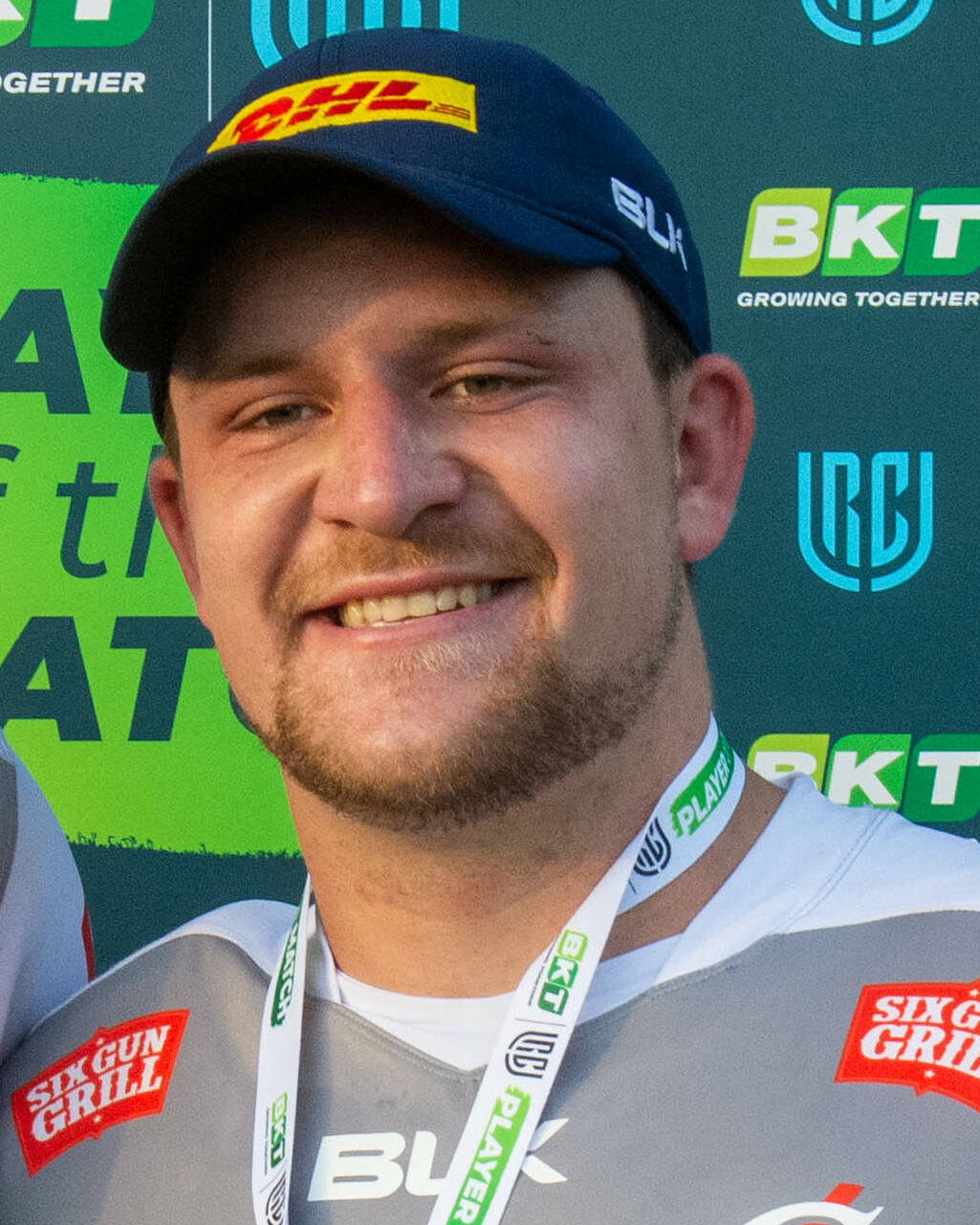
- Venter in 2022
- Full name: Andre-Hugo Venter
- Born: 10 September 2001 (age 25) South Africa
- Height: 1.87 m (6 ft 1 1/2 in)
- Weight: 106 kg (234 lb)
- Notable relative: André Venter (father)

Rugby union career
- Position: Hooker
- Current team: Stormers / Western Province
Senior career
Years	Team	Apps	(Points)
2020–	Stormers	44	(40)
2021–	Western Province	9	(10)
- Correct as of 23 July 2022
International career
Years	Team	Apps	(Points)
2024–	South Africa	1	(5)
- Correct as of 06 July 2026

Andre-Hugo Venter (born 10 September 2001) is a South African rugby union player for the Stormers in the United Rugby Championship and Western Province in the Currie Cup. His regular position is hooker and he is the son of former Springbok flanker André Venter.

Venter was named in the Stormers squad for the Pro14 Rainbow Cup SA campaign. He made his debut for Stormers in Round 5 of the Pro14 Rainbow Cup SA against the Bulls.

== Statistics ==
=== Test match record ===
As of 18 July 2026

Opponent	P	W	D	L	Try	Pts	%Won
Portugal	1	1	0	0	1	5	100
Wales	1	1	0	0	0	0	100
Total	2	2	0	0	1	5	100

=== International tries ===
As of 18 July 2026

Try	Opposing team	Location	Venue	Competition	Date	Result	Score
1	Portugal	Bloemfontein, South Africa	Free State Stadium	2024 mid-year test	20 July 2024	Win	64–21
