= Suleiman Hartzenberg =

South African rugby union player

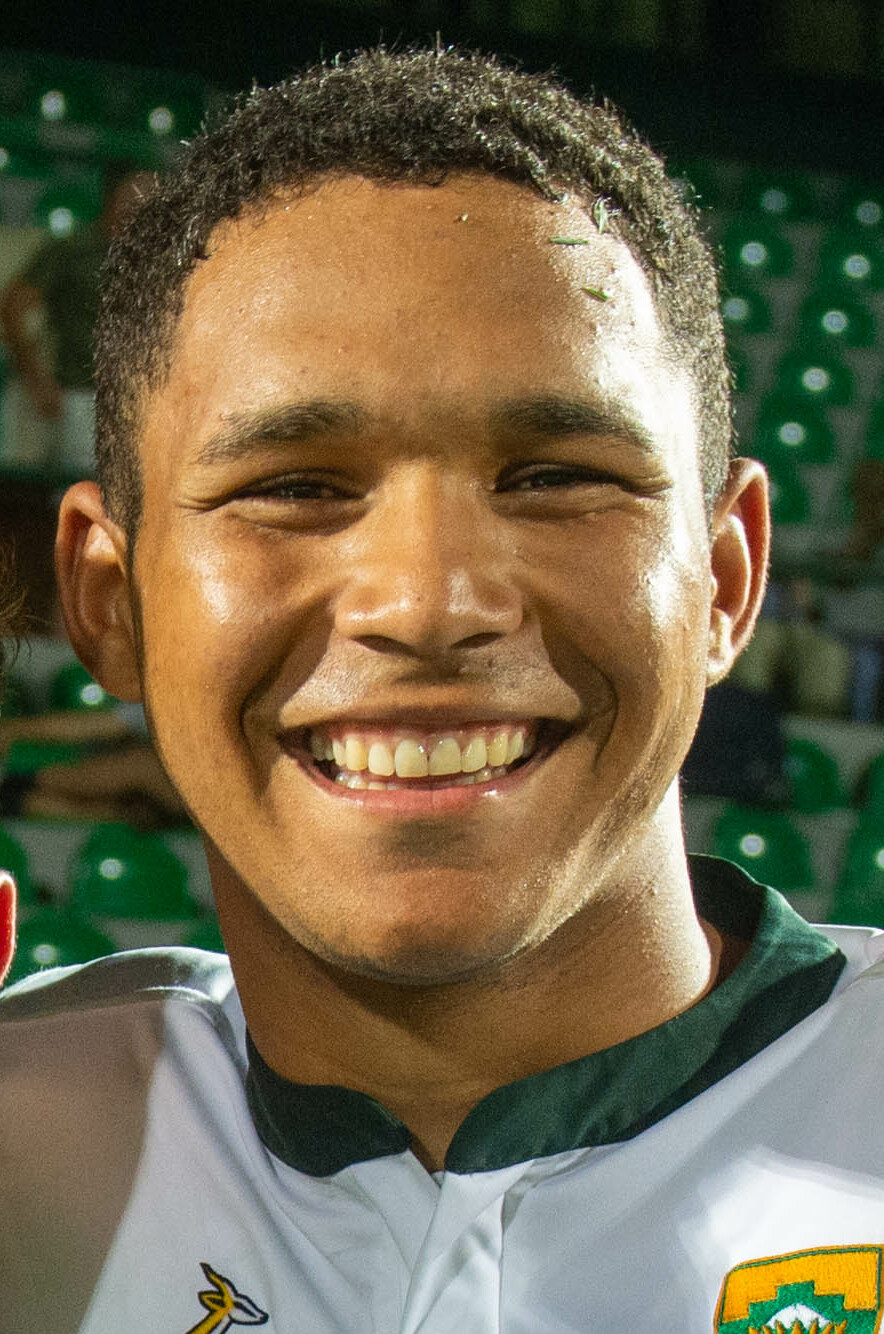
- Born: 20 May 2003 (age 23) Cape Town, South Africa
- Height: 1.86 m (6 ft 1 in)
- Weight: 91 kg (14 st 5 lb; 201 lb)
- School: Bishop's College

Rugby union career
- Position: Centre / Wing
- Current team: Stormers / Western Province
Amateur team(s)
Years	Team	Apps	(Points)
- Ikey Tigers
Senior career
Years	Team	Apps	(Points)
2022–	Stormers	58	(95)
2023–	Western Province		
- Correct as of 8 November 2022
International career
Years	Team	Apps	(Points)
2022–	South Africa U20	4	(35)
2022–	South Africa A		
- Correct as of 8 November 2022

Suleiman Hartzenberg (born 20 May 2003) is a South African rugby union player for the Stormers in the United Rugby Championship. His regular position is centre or wing.

Hartzenberg was named in the Stormers side for the 2022–23 United Rugby Championship, making his debut in Round 1 against Connacht. Described as a member of a "very special generation" at the Stormers by coach John Dobson, he was named in the South Africa A squad for their European tour in October 2022.
