= Ben-Jason Dixon =

South African rugby union player

- Full name: Ben-Jason Dixon
- Born: 29 April 1998 (age 28) Cape Town, South Africa
- Height: 1.98 m (6 ft 6 in)
- Weight: 114 kg (17 st 13 lb; 251 lb)
- School: Paul Roos Gymnasium
- University: Stellenbosch University

Rugby union career
- Position: Lock / Flanker
- Current team: Stormers / Western Province
Senior career
| Years | Team | Apps | (Points) |
| 2019– | Western Province | 17 | (0) |
| 2020– | Stormers | 50 | (5) |
- Correct as of 28 August 2024
International career
| Years | Team | Apps | (Points) |
| 2024-present | South Africa | 11 | (10) |

Ben-Jason Dixon (born 29 April 1998) is a South African rugby union player for the Stormers in the United Rugby Championship and Western Province in the Currie Cup. His regular position is lock or flanker. He earned his 1st Springbok cap on 20 July 2024.

Dixon was named in the Stormers squad for the 2020 Super Rugby season. He made his debut for the Stormers in Round 4 of Super Rugby Unlocked against the Bulls.

== International statistics ==
=== Test Match record ===
As of 8 August 2026

| Against | P | W | D | L | Tri | Pts | %Won |
|---|---|---|---|---|---|---|---|
| Argentina | 2 | 1 | 0 | 1 | 0 | 0 | 50 |
| Australia | 1 | 1 | 0 | 0 | 0 | 0 | 100 |
| England | 1 | 1 | 0 | 0 | 1 | 5 | 100 |
| Italy | 1 | 1 | 0 | 0 | 0 | 0 | 100 |
| New Zealand | 1 | 1 | 0 | 0 | 0 | 0 | 100 |
| Portugal | 1 | 1 | 0 | 0 | 1 | 5 | 100 |
| Scotland | 1 | 1 | 0 | 0 | 0 | 0 | 100 |
| Wales | 3 | 3 | 0 | 0 | 0 | 0 | 100 |
| Total | 11 | 10 | 0 | 1 | 2 | 10 | 90.91 |

Pld = Games Played, W = Games Won, D = Games Drawn, L = Games Lost, Tri = Tries Scored, Pts = Points Scored

=== International tries ===
As of 4 July 2026

| Try | Opposing team | Location | Venue | Competition | Date | Result | Score |
|---|---|---|---|---|---|---|---|
| 1 | Portugal | Bloemfontein, South Africa | Free State Stadium | 2024 mid-year tests | 20 July 2024 | Win | 64–21 |
| 2 | England | Johannesburg, South Africa | Ellis Park Stadium | 2026 Nations Championship | 4 July 2026 | Win | 45–21 |
