= Stefan Ungerer =

South African rugby union player

- Born: 23 November 1993 (age 32) Pietermaritzburg
- Height: 1.85 m (6 ft 1 in)
- Weight: 84 kg (185 lb; 13 st 3 lb)
- School: Maritzburg College

Rugby union career
- Position: Scrum-half
- Current team: Stormers
Youth career
- 2006–2014: Sharks
Senior career
| Years | Team | Apps | (Points) |
| 2013–2015 | Sharks XV | 10 | (10) |
| 2014–2016 | Sharks | 17 | (25) |
| 2015–2016 | Sharks (Currie Cup) | 12 | (5) |
| 2017 | Eastern Province Kings | 5 | (15) |
| 2017 | Southern Kings | 3 | (0) |
| 2017–2018 | Pumas | 26 | (35) |
| 2018–2020 | Southern Kings | 22 | (40) |
| 2021–2022 | Griquas | 23 | (10) |
| 2021– | Stormers | 5 | (5) |
- Correct as of 10 July 2022
International career
| Years | Team | Apps | (Points) |
| 2013 | South Africa Under-20 | 4 | (5) |
- Correct as of 23 April 2018

Stefan Ungerer (born 23 November 1993) is a South African rugby union player for the DHL Stormers in the United Rugby Championship. His regular position is scrum-half.

== Career ==
=== Youth level ===
Ungerer represented the Sharks at Under-13, Under-16, Under-19 and Under-21 level in various youth tournaments.

=== Sharks ===
In 2013, he was included in their Vodacom Cup squad and made his provincial first class debut in the 72–6 victory over the Border Bulldogs.

=== S.A. Under-20 ===
Ungerer was included in the training group that toured Argentina in preparation for the 2013 IRB Junior World Championship. He was then included in the squad for the 2013 IRB Junior World Championship.
