= Paul de Villiers =

South African rugby union player

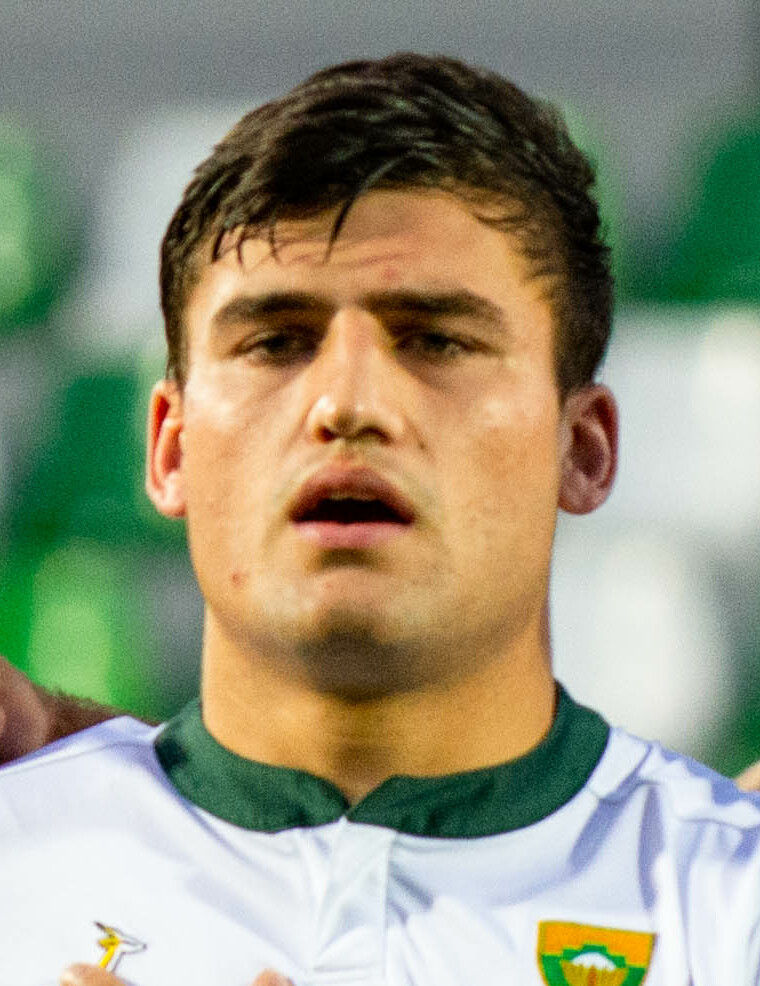
- Born: 13 January 2003 (age 23) George, South Africa
- Height: 180 cm (5 ft 11 in)
- Weight: 101 kg (223 lb; 15 st 13 lb)
- School: Hoër Landbouskool Oakdale, Riversdale
- University: Stellenbosch University

Rugby union career
- Position: Flanker
- Current team: Stormers / Western Province
Senior career
| Years | Team | Apps | (Points) |
| 2023– | Western Province | 11 | (10) |
| 2023– | Stormers | | |
- Correct as of 29 October 2023
International career
| Years | Team | Apps | (Points) |
| 2022–2023 | South Africa U20 | 9 | (0) |
| 2026– | South Africa | 3 | (0) |
- Correct as of 18 July 2026

Paul de Villiers (born 13 January 2003) is a South African rugby union player, who plays for the Stormers in the United Rugby Championship and the Western Province in the Currie Cup. His preferred position is flanker.

== Early career ==
De Villiers was born in George, South Africa and was a resident of Dagbreek. He came through the academy system of the Western Province, representing their U21 side. De Villiers represented South Africa U20 in 2022 and 2023, being named captain in 2023.

== Professional career ==
De Villiers made his professional debut for the Western Province in the 2023 Currie Cup Premier Division, debuting against the Sharks. He would go on to make a further 2 appearances that season. He has been named in the Stormers squad ahead of the 2023–24 United Rugby Championship.

== Statistics ==
=== Test match record ===
As of 8 November 2026

| Opponent | P | W | D | L | Try | Pts | %Won |
|---|---|---|---|---|---|---|---|
| Australia | 1 | 0 | 0 | 1 | 0 | 0 | 0 |
| England | 1 | 1 | 0 | 0 | 0 | 0 | 100 |
| France | 1 | 0 | 0 | 1 | 0 | 0 | 0 |
| Italy | 1 | 1 | 0 | 0 | 1 | 5 | 100 |
| New Zealand | 1 | 0 | 0 | 1 | 0 | 0 | 0 |
| Scotland | 1 | 1 | 0 | 0 | 0 | 0 | 100 |
| Wales | 1 | 1 | 0 | 0 | 1 | 5 | 100 |
| Total | 7 | 4 | 0 | 3 | 2 | 10 | 57.14 |

=== International tries ===
As of 8 November 2026

| Try | Opposing team | Location | Venue | Competition | Date | Result | Score |
|---|---|---|---|---|---|---|---|
| 1 | Wales | Durban, South Africa | Kings Park Stadium | 2026 Nations Championship | 18 July 2026 | Win | 43–0 |
| 2 | Italy | Turin, Italy | Juventus Stadium | 2026 Nations Championship | 7 November 2026 | Win | 7–66 |
