= Jurie Matthee =

South African rugby union player

- Born: 4 November 2000 (age 26) South Africa
- Height: 191 cm (6 ft 3 in)
- Weight: 89 kg (196 lb; 14 st 0 lb)
- School: Paarl Gimnasium
- University: Stellenbosch University

Rugby union career
- Position: Fly-half
- Current team: Stormers / Western Province
Senior career
Years	Team	Apps	(Points)
2023–	Western Province	5	(23)
2023–	Stormers		
- Correct as of 29 October 2023

Jurie Matthee (born 4 November 2000) is a South African rugby union player, who plays for the Stormers in the United Rugby Championship and the Western Province in the Currie Cup. His preferred position is fly-half.

== Early career ==
Matthee attended Stellenbosch University, where he resided in Dagbreek Men's Residence, having gone to school at Paarl Gimnasium. In 2023, he captained the Stellenbosch Maties side, where his performances earned him the attention of the Western Province.

== Professional career ==
Matthee signed for the Western Province in July 2023. Earlier that year he had made appearances for their Currie Cup side, making his debut against the Free State Cheetahs. He would go on to make 5 appearances that season, scoring 23 total points. Ahead of the 2023–24 United Rugby Championship season, he was named in the Stormers squad, playing for the side in pre-season against the SWD Eagles.
