= Stormers =

South African rugby union club, based in Cape Town

(South Africa) Stormers
- Union: Western Province Rugby Football Union
- Founded: 1883; 143 years ago
- Location: Cape Town, South Africa
- Region: Cape Town; Cape Winelands or Boland; West Coast
- Ground(s): Main Ground: DHL Stadium (capacity 55,000); Secondary Ground: Danie Craven Stadium (capacity 16,000)
- Coach(es): John Dobson (URC & ERCC); Tom Dawson-Squibb (CC)
- Captain(s): Ruhan Nel (URC & ERCC); Jean-Luc du Plessis (CC)
- League(s): United Rugby Championship; European Rugby Champions Cup; Currie Cup
- 2025–26 & 2026: URC Semi-finalist; South African Shield: 3rd 3rd overall 2026 CC; 7th overall
1st kit	2nd kit

Official website
- stormers.co.za
- Current season

The Stormers (known for sponsorship reasons as the DHL Stormers) is a South African professional rugby union team based in Cape Town, in the Western Cape, that competes in the United Rugby Championship (a trans-hemispheric competition) and the Currie Cup (as the Stormers XXIII). They competed in Super Rugby until 2020. They have won one major championship, the 2021-22 United Rugby Championship, and seven South African 'conference' titles (five in the South African Conference of Super Rugby, and two in the URC equivalent, the South African Shield). They have won the Currie Cup on a record 34 occasions.

== Background ==
Stormers are centred on the Western Province Currie Cup side, but also draw players from the Boland Cavaliers (covering the Cape Winelands and West Coast districts, with home matches in Wellington). Through 2005, they also drew players from the SWD Eagles (George), which meant that they drew players from all three unions in the Western Cape Province. However, the general realignment of franchise areas resulting from the expansion of the competition resulted in the Eagles being moved to the area of the Southern Spears (later succeeded by the Southern Kings).

Before 1998, South Africa did not use a franchise system for the Super 12, instead sending the top four unions from its domestic competition, the Currie Cup, into the Super 12. In 1996, the Stormers qualified and competed in the Super 12 as Western Province. In 1997, they did not qualify, the 4th South African team being the Orange Free State (now the Free State Cheetahs at Currie Cup level; the region would later be represented in Super 12 by the Cats (now known as the Lions) and in Super 14 by the Cheetahs).

The Stormers played their first ever final, against the Bulls in front of 36,000 fans in Johannesburg, in 2010 after beating the Waratahs in the semi-final stage but ultimately lost to the Bulls. In the two previous years in which they reached the semi-finals, 1999 and 2004, they were eliminated by the Highlanders and Crusaders.

They made consecutive home semifinals in 2011 and 2012, but lost both at Newlands to the Crusaders and the Sharks respectively. In 2015 they won the South African conference for a third time, before losing their home quarterfinal against the Brumbies.

In 2021–22, the Stormers, with their other South African Super Rugby colleagues the Bulls, the Sharks and the Lions, left Super Rugby to join the newly renamed United Rugby Championship with teams from Ireland, Scotland, Italy and Wales. Their first season in the URC was a success, winning the South African shield as the top team in their national conference, followed by the overall URC title with a win against the Bulls in the 2022 final. On 2 June 2022 it was confirmed that the four South African URC franchises, and the former Pro 14 franchise, the Cheetahs would be entering the European Professional Club Rugby competitions for the first time in 2022–23, with the Stormers in the first tier European Rugby Champions Cup.

== History ==
=== Pre-franchise history ===
The club is nicknamed Die Streeptruie ("The Striped Jerseys" in Afrikaans) in reference to their legendary blue and white hooped jerseys. These Striped Jerseys were the colours of Malmesbury Rugby Football Club, established in 1881. They are also known simply as "Province" by all South African rugby lovers, while Afrikaans-speaking supporters also refer to the team by its abbreviation, W.P. (pronounced: "vee pee" ["ee" as in "beer"]).

Another accomplishment of Western Province, which no South African team has ever been able to match, is the double victories over the All Blacks the first being (10–3) played on 15 August 1928 and again (12–11) on 16 July 1976, while several countries have never been able to beat the All Black team, Province managed this feat. In 2010 province again did a remarkable victory over all of New Zealand's five super unions, this was the first and only time such an accomplishment has been achieved. Province has also beaten the Wallabies 17–6 in a thrilling encounter in 1963. Province has also drawn to other countries including England in 1984 with a score of 15 all, however province has beaten the British and Irish Lions numerous times, including three times in 1903 and won another match in 1924, the match then had been regarded as "test" status. The only two teams to have beaten overseas countries as well as combination teams (Lions) are yet again the Blue Bulls and Western Province.

The club was established in 1883. The club claimed their first Currie Cup title in 1889; they repeated this success just three years later, winning the title again in 1892. Western Province continued to dominate the Currie Cup throughout the 1890s, winning the competition in 1894, 1895, 1897 and 1898. This success continued into the early 1900s, as they won in 1904, 1906 and 1908. The competition still being contested irregularly at this stage, was next won by the Western Province in 1914. They won a further seven times over the next two decades – four times in the 1920s and again three times in the 1930s, sharing two with Border. When the first Currie Cup championship was introduced in 1939, Western Province featured in the final, but lost to Transvaal 17–6 in Cape Town.

After losing the final in 1946 to Northern Transvaal, Western Province won their first final in 1947. The Currie Cup became an annual competition in 1969 and Western Province made it to the final that year, though they lost to Northern Transvaal. The team had to wait another seven seasons before making another final appearance, which they lost against the Orange Free State (recently renamed as the Free State Cheetahs) in Bloemfontein. Three years later they won the Currie Cup, sharing with Northern Transvaal at Newlands Stadium in Cape Town. The next year Province again lost in the final to Northern Transvaal. Northern Transvaal became Western Province's biggest rival during this time. During South Africa's sporting isolation (brought about as a result of the country's apartheid policy) this rivalry took centre stage and became the climax of the Currie Cup season. The teams met in another six championship finals until the 1990s. In the 1980s Western Province experienced what many described as their "golden years", winning the title outright for five years in a row. This feat is yet to be equaled. (Northern Transvaal had achieved this before but their third victory in the winning streak was shared with Western Province) After drawing 16 all with Northern Transvaal in the 1989 final, their next final appearance would be in 1995, when they were defeated by the Sharks in Durban. They won the Currie Cup in 1997, defeating the Free State Cheetahs, but the following season they lost to the Blue Bulls (Northern Transvaal).

Western Province won the championship twice in 2000 and 2001, defeating the Sharks on both occasions. 2010 saw the return of the club as they managed to make both the Super Rugby and Currie Cup finals losing on both occasions. After winning the Vodacom Cup and the Super Rugby Conference Cup, Western Province beat the Sharks in Durban to win the Currie Cup in 2012 as well. In 2013 the Province went unbeaten throughout the Currie Cup but lost in the Final. Western Province continued to dominate the Currie Cup by making the 3 finals in as many years and won the 2014 title beating the Lions in a tight fought match. In 2015 the club went on to win their 3rd and unprecedented Super Rugby Conference Cup in 5 years. In the recent times and in terms of competitions won on all levels, Western Province has been the most successful Rugby Union in South Africa over the period 2011–2015.

==== Name ====
The name of the club comes simply from the province they represent. In the 1990s many teams changed their names. Previously many teams were named after the provinces they were based in. Some teams simply added some form of animal or mascot name (e.g. Boland became the Boland Cavaliers) whereas others changed their entire name. Transvaal for example, changed their name to the Golden Lions. Northern Transvaal were also renamed the Blue Bulls, the team's nickname for many years. Western Province is the only union that retained its name.

=== Franchise history ===
With the launch of the Super 12 in 1996, both Australia and New Zealand adopted franchise-based models for their provincial teams that were to compete in the new competition. However, the South Africa teams were to be determined by the results of the previous season's Currie Cup, with the top four sides gaining entry in the Super 12. Newlands did see Super 12 competition during the era when this model of competition was used, with the Western Province gaining promotion for the inaugural season of 1996. However, the team did not perform that well, winning only three matches from 11 fixtures, and finishing second last on the table, though Transvaal and the Wellington Hurricanes both won the same number of games as the Western Province, they finished higher, due to a superior for and against.

The following season, in 1997, the Western Province did not gain promotion to the Super 12, and the Cape Town area was not represented that season, as the South Africa teams in competition were instead the Sharks, Gauteng Lions, Free State and Northern Transvaal. The next season, South Africa adopted a similar system to that of New Zealand's and Australia's, creating four new provincial sides, and abolishing qualification through the Currie Cup. One of the sides created was the Stormers, or the Western Stormers. The Stormers' first season was fairly similar to that of the Western Province's in 1996, winning just the three games out of 11 fixtures, though they finished in ninth place overall on the table.

The 1999 Super 12 season was far more successful for the Stormers, as they lost only three matches during the regular season; against the ACT Brumbies, the Otago Highlanders and fellow South African team, the Cats, though the Stormers ended up finishing higher on the table than all of those sides, finishing in second place overall, behind the Queensland Reds. The Stormers thus qualified for the semi-finals for the first time and, due to their log position, hosted their semi-final in Cape Town. However, they were defeated by the Otago Highlanders, 33 points to 18.

In 2000, the Stormers fell just short of making the finals again, as they finished in fifth position, with a total of 31 points, just one point behind the Cats and Highlanders who both made it to the semi-finals, on 32 points. The following season - 2001 - saw the Stormers move further away from a place in the finals, as they won only five of their 11 fixtures and finished in seventh place on the log. The following season was not any better for the Stormers, despite starting the season with an optimistic 40 to 18 win over the Sharks, the Stormers ended up finishing in ninth place on the log.

The 2004 season saw the Stormers return to the success of 1999, as they qualified for the play-offs again. The team finished in third place overall, with seven wins, and on 34 points, one point more than the fourth placed Chiefs. The Stormers travelled to Jade Stadium in Christchurch, where they met the Crusaders in the semi-final. The home team won, defeating the Stormers 27 points to 16. The following season the Stormers fell to ninth place on the table come the end of the regular season, far from finals contention.

For the 2006 season, the Super 12 became the Super 14, with the addition of two new teams; one from Australia, the Western Force, and one from South Africa, the Cheetahs. The Stormers won four of the now 13 regular rounds, finishing in 11th place in the final standings.

The year 2008 was one of revival for the Stormers after Kobus van der Merwe was fired and ex-Cheetahs coach, Rassie Erasmus, was brought in as head coach and WP Director of Rugby. Rassie Erasmus was hoping for a top half of the table finish, however the Stormers exceeded expectations and after losing their first 3 games of the season fought back to finish tied for 4th place on the log, missing out on an away semi final due to an inferior points difference to the Hurricanes.

After a poor 2009, Allister Coetzee was appointed the coach and the Stormers reshuffled their squad, bringing in many new faces including Springbok stars Jacque Fourie and Bryan Habana, while losing a host of players such as Springbok centre Jean de Villiers (Munster), fullback Percy Montgomery (Retired) and controversial flank Luke Watson (Bath). The Stormers enjoyed a successful start to their 2010 campaign, winning 5 of their first 6 games. They then started their four match tour of the Antipodes and while they disappointingly lost to the then last-placed Western Force and a resurgent Queensland Reds, they defeated the Blues and Chiefs to be firmly in semi-final contention at the end of the tour. They returned home to South Africa and after cruising past the Crusaders, they lost to the Sharks. This meant that they had to win their last game against the Bulls to claim a home semi-final. The Bulls, already qualified in first position, fielded a weakened line-up and the Stormers duly beat them 38–10 for their first home semi-final since 1999. In the semi-final against the Waratahs a win was never in doubt as they beat the men from Sydney 25–6, the game's only try being a spectacular individual effort by Juan de Jongh. With the Bulls winning the other semi against the Crusaders, an all South African final was ensured.

After a great semifinal performance, the Stormers went down in the final 25–17 to the Bulls at the historic Orlando Stadium. The Stormers started slowly with a try against the run of play from Francois Hougaard but time ran out as they took the ascendency.

In 2012, the Stormers topped the log for the first time, after being undefeated at home and winning almost all their South African conference games, the Stormers headed to the Semi Finals with a guaranteed home final if they won, however the Sharks managed to knock out the Cape side and left them wondering for a second straight year, this was to be revenged in October when Province gave the Sharks payback by winning the Currie Cup against them.

In 2013 the Stormers had a tough start to the season, and despite winning their last six matches it was not enough to secure a play-off spot as they ended the season in seventh place, the following year the Cape side ended in 11th place after winning nine and losing nine games, however in 2015 they managed to qualify for the play-off once more after winning the South African conference before going down to the Brumbies in a home play-off match at Newlands.

With the departure of Allister Coetzee at the end of the 2015 season, the Stormers appointed former Springbok centre Robbie Fleck as the new head coach in 2016.

The 2020 season was the last to be played at Newlands rugby stadium. John Dobson served as head coach, and the forward pack included several Springboks, who had won the 2019 Rugby World Cup.

In December 2023, it was announced that 74% of the shares in WP Professional Rugby (Pty) Ltd had been acquired by the Red Disa consortium, consisting of the Cape Town-based investment holding company Fynbos Ekwiteit, Ardagh Glass Packaging and the investment company Marble Head Investments.

In March 2024, it was announced that the vacant position of Chief Executive Officer (CEO) had been filled by Johan le Roux. At the same time, John Dobson has now taken on the role of Director of Rugby in addition to his duties as Head Coach of the Stormers.

== Kit ==
The first (Western) Stormers jersey and logo in 1998 combined the colours of the three Unions who made up the regional franchise – WP, SWD and Boland. There were a myriad of colours in the jersey – blue, white, red, green, gold – and a triangular logo with a wave affect inside. Some liked the look, most did not. One newspaper scribe wrote: "It looks like scrambled eggs with a box of Smarties thrown in!"

In 1999 came a dramatic change from the "loud" look to a simple black jumper and shorts, with black and white "Barbarian" socks, bold numbering and the now familiar lightning bolt logo on the breast. The move to black was done with the express purpose of appealing to a much wider audience. Black became one of the core attributes of the Stormers brand.

2007, however, saw a move away from black to navy blue as the Stormers and WP brands converged.

In 2011, white bars across the front of the navy blue jersey was introduced in order to bring it further in line with the WP brand

In 2013 the colour was changed from blue to royal blue, the original colour of WP Rugby. When held to low light however, the jerseys show two different shades of blue.

From their inception until 2017, the Stormers' uniforms were made by international sportswear giants Adidas, who had likewise supplied Western Province's playing strip since 1983. However, from 2018 till 2025 WPRFU officials announced that both the Stormers and Province would wear unbranded jerseys manufactured by local firm Genuine Connection, who had previously been contracted by Adidas to produce their team-issue playing kits since the year 2000 however on August 26, 2025, after 8 years they reunited with adidas on a new contract.

=== Sponsors on kit ===
Period	Kit manufacturer	Shirt sponsor
1996–1999	Adidas	Norwich
1999–2003	Adidas	Fedsure
2003–2006	Adidas	Investec
2006–2011	Adidas	Vodacom
2011–2017	Adidas	DHL
2017–2025	BLK	DHL
2025–present	Adidas	DHL

=== Logos on kit ===
1996–1999

1999–2007

2007–2025

2025–

== Honours ==
Super 12/14 (1996–2010)

- Runners-up (1): 2010
- Play-off appearances (3): 1999, 2004, 2010

Super Rugby (2011–2020)

- Semi-finalists (2): 2011 and 2012
- Qualifiers (1): 2015
- South African Conference Champions (5): 2011, 2012, 2015, 2016, 2017

Super Rugby Unlocked

- Runners-up (1): 2020

URC (2021–present)

- Champions (1): 2021-2022
- Runners-Up (1): 2022-2023
- URC South African Shield Champions (2): 2021-2022, 2022-2023

Board Trophy

- 1889

Currie Cup

- Winners on 34 occasions (4 shared): 1892, 1894, 1895, 1897, 1898, 1904, 1906, 1908, 1914, 1920, 1925, 1927, 1929, 1932 (shared), 1934 (shared), 1936, 1947, 1954, 1959, 1964, 1966, 1979 (shared), 1982, 1983, 1984, 1985, 1986, 1989 (shared), 1997, 2000, 2001, 2012, 2014, 2017

Lion Cup

- Winners on three occasions: 1984, 1988, 1989

Currie Cup / Central Series Percy Frames Trophy

- 1986

SuperSport Rugby Challenge

- 2017

Vodacom Cup

- 2012

Bankfin Nite Series

- 1997

== Stadium ==
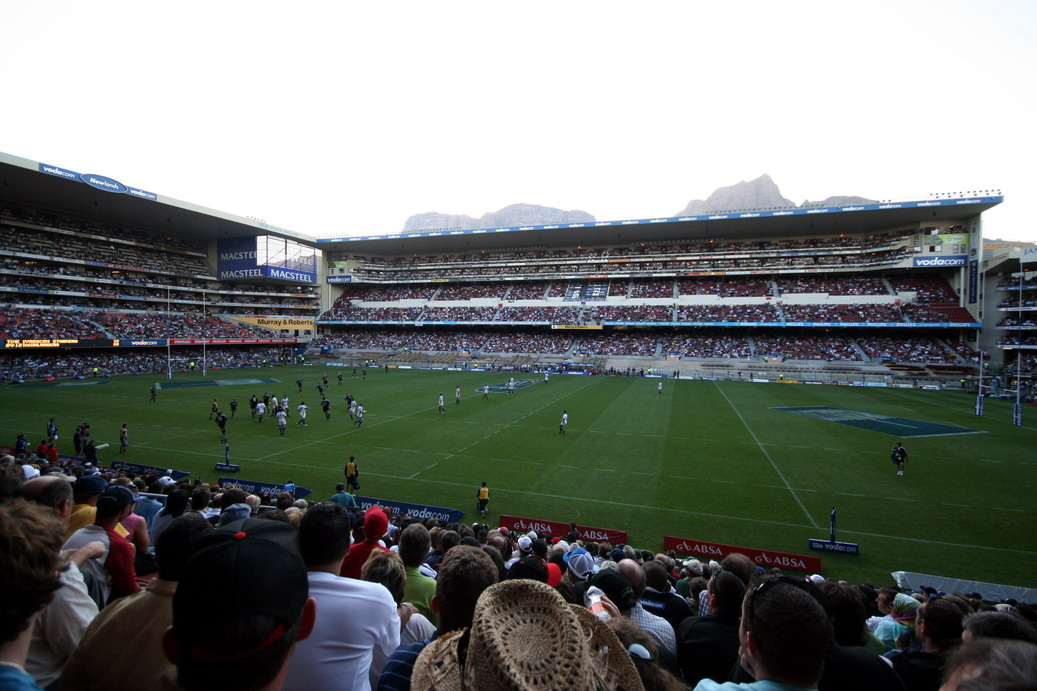
A Stormers match taking place at Newlands

Newlands Stadium was built in 1888 and played first official matches in 1890. The ground was then continually developed over the coming century. The stadium took on various names over the years due to sponsorship of the Western Province side, companies have sponsored Newlands over the years that have sponsored include Vodacom and DHL. The stadium often had the largest average crowds of any stadium in the Super Rugby when the Stormers competed. Over 131 years, the stadium amassed over 1 million spectators.

In 2016, speculation of a possible move from Newlands to the Cape Town Stadium, which was built for the 2010 FIFA World Cup, began to form, The Stormers continued playing at Newlands until 2021 when after 131 years playing at the stadium, the Western Province Football Union decided to move the Stormers and Western Province to the Cape Town Stadium, later renaming it to the DHL Stadium after it obtained the sponsorship rights. And Putting Newlands up for sale, as of October 2025, the stadium yet to be sold to a developer. The highest capacity for a Stormers game ever took place at Cape Town Stadium, against Munster in 2023, with a crowd of 55,000 coming to watch the URC Grand Final.

== Current squad ==
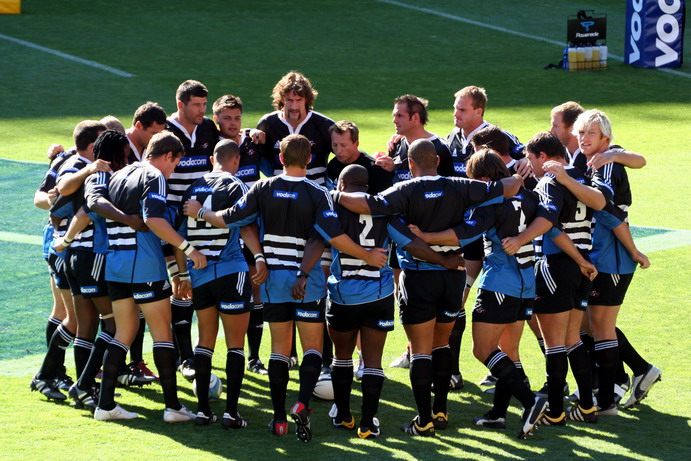
The Stormers playing in 2006

The Stormers squad for the 2026–27 United Rugby Championship is. (Note: Hencus van Wyk was named in the original Stormers squad, but joined the Bulls on loan for the 2026–27 European Rugby Champions Cup competition.)

2026–27 Stormers squad
**Props**: (South Africa) **Neethling Fouché**; (Scotland) **Oli Kebble**; (South Africa) **Wilco Louw**; (South Africa) Herman Lubbe; (Zimbabwe) Vernon Matongo *; (South Africa) **Ntuthuko Mchunu**; (South Africa) **Zachary Porthen**; (South Africa) Olly Reid; (South Africa) Sazi Sandi; **Hookers**: (South Africa) Luca Bakkes; (South Africa) JJ Kotze; (South Africa) **Bongi Mbonambi** (Note: Signed from the Sharks in October 2026.); (South Africa) Vernon Paulo; (South Africa) Altus Rabe (Note: Called into squad as late inclusion for Round 5.); (South Africa) **Andre-Hugo Venter**; (South Africa) Lukhanyo Vokozela; **Locks**: (South Africa) Connor Evans; (South Africa) Albert Liebenberg (Note: Signed on loan from the Griquas in October 2026.); (South Africa) Riley Norton; (Zimbabwe) **Gary Porter**; (South Africa) JD Schickerling; (South Africa) Adré Smith	**Back row**: (South Africa) Ruan Ackermann; (South Africa) Hacjivah Dayimani; (South Africa) **Paul de Villiers**; (South Africa) **Ben-Jason Dixon**; (South Africa) **Deon Fourie**; (South Africa) Divan Fuller; (South Africa) **Siya Kolisi**; (South Africa) Wandile Mlaba; (South Africa) Keke Morabe; (South Africa) Louw Nel; (South Africa) **Evan Roos**; (South Africa) Marcel Theunissen; **Scrum-halves**: (South Africa) Jayden Brits; (South Africa) Imad Khan; (South Africa) Ezekiel Ngobeni; (South Africa) Haashim Pead (Note: Signed from the Lions in September 2026.); (South Africa) **Cobus Reinach**; (South Africa) Stefan Ungerer; (South Africa) André Warner (Note: Signed on loan from Seattle Seawolves in September 2026.); **Fly-halves**: (South Africa) Yaqeen Ahmed; (South Africa) Jean-Luc du Plessis; (South Africa) **Sacha Feinberg-Mngomezulu**; (South Africa) Jurie Matthee; (South Africa) Kyle Smith	**Centres**: (South Africa) Josh Boulle; (South Africa) Markus Muller; (South Africa) Ruhan Nel **(c)**; (South Africa) Jonathan Roche; (South Africa) Wandisile Simelane; **Wings**: (South Africa) Gino Cupido; (South Africa) Lleyton Davids (Note: Signed in October 2026.); (South Africa) **Cheslin Kolbe**; (South Africa) Joel Leotlela; (South Africa) JC Mars; (South Africa) Mfundo Ndhlovu; (South Africa) Seabelo Senatla; (South Africa) Leolin Zas; **Fullbacks**: (South Africa) **Warrick Gelant**; (South Africa) **Damian Willemse**
**(c)** denotes the team captain. **Bold** denotes internationally capped players. * denotes players qualified to play for South Africa on residency or dual nationality. Source:

The following players have been included so far in the Stormers XXIII squad for the 2026 Currie Cup Premier Division:

2026 Stormers XXIII Currie Cup squad
**Props**: (Scotland) **Oli Kebble**; (South Africa) Mhleli Khuzwayo; (South Africa) Danie Kruger; (South Africa) Herman Lubbe; (South Africa) Olly Reid; (South Africa) Hencus van Wyk; **Hookers**: (South Africa) Luca Bakkes; (South Africa) **Scarra Ntubeni**; (South Africa) Vernon Paulo; (South Africa) Altus Rabe (Note: Addition for 2026 Currie Cup); (South Africa) Lukhanyo Vokozela; **Locks**: (South Africa) Thomas Barnard; (South Africa) Dylan de Leeuw (Note: Addition for 2026 Currie Cup); (South Africa) Gerbrandt Grobler (Note: Addition for 2026 Currie Cup); (South Africa) Enos Ndiao (Note: Addition for 2026 Currie Cup); (South Africa) Riley Norton; (Zimbabwe) **Gary Porter**	**Back row**: (South Africa) Ruan Ackermann; (South Africa) Eric Basson (Note: Addition for 2026 Currie Cup); (South Africa) Luan Botha (Note: Addition for 2026 Currie Cup); (South Africa) Aden da Costa; (South Africa) Divan Fuller; (South Africa) Gert Kemp (Note: Addition for 2026 Currie Cup); (South Africa) Reuben Kruger; (South Africa) Wandile Mlaba; (South Africa) Keke Morabe; (South Africa) Louw Nel; (South Africa) Xola Nyali; (South Africa) Alutha Wesi; **Scrum-halves**: (South Africa) Jayden Brits; (South Africa) Tiaan Fourie (Note: Addition for 2026 Currie Cup); (South Africa) Ezekiel Ngobeni; (South Africa) Stefan Ungerer; **Fly-halves**: (South Africa) Yaqeen Ahmed; (South Africa) Kian Davis (Note: Addition for 2026 Currie Cup); (South Africa) Jean-Luc du Plessis **(c)**; (South Africa) Kyle Smith	**Centres**: (South Africa) Samuel Badenhorst; (South Africa) Josh Boulle; (South Africa) Gino Cupido; (South Africa) Dominic Malgas; (South Africa) Markus Muller; (South Africa) Bruce Sherwood; (South Africa) Cornel Smit (Note: Addition for 2026 Currie Cup); **Wings**: (South Africa) Jack Benade; (South Africa) Jameel de Jongh; (South Africa) Suleiman Hartzenberg; (South Africa) Joel Leotlela; (South Africa) JC Mars; (South Africa) Mfundo Ndhlovu; **Fullbacks**: (South Africa) Luke Burger; (South Africa) Dylan Miller
**(c)** denotes the team captain. **Bold** denotes internationally capped players. * denotes players qualified to play for South Africa on residency or dual nationality. Source:

== Season standings ==
Super Rugby
Season	Pos	Pld	W	D	L	PF	PA	+/–	BP	Pts	Notes
1996	11th	11	3	1	7	251	353	−102	1	15	As Western Province
1998	9th	11	3	0	8	248	364	−116	6	18	
1999	2nd	11	8	0	3	290	244	+46	4	36	Lost semi-final to Highlanders
2000	5th	11	6	1	4	298	276	+22	5	31	
2001	7th	11	5	0	6	278	285	−7	6	26	
2002	7th	11	5	0	6	310	314	−4	7	27	
2003	9th	11	5	0	6	255	354	−99	3	23	
2004	3rd	11	7	0	4	286	260	+26	5	33	Lost semi-final to Crusaders
2005	9th	11	3	1	7	215	320	−105	4	18	
2006	11th	13	4	1	8	263	334	−71	5	23	
2007	10th	13	6	0	7	249	326	−77	3	27	
2008	5th	13	8	1	4	269	211	+58	7	41	
2009	10th	13	5	0	8	235	249	−14	7	27	
2010	2nd	13	9	0	4	365	171	+194	8	44	Lost final to Bulls
2011	2nd	16	12	0	4	400	257	+143	7	63	Lost semi-final to Crusaders
2012	1st	16	14	0	2	350	254	+96	2	66	Lost semi-final to Sharks
2013	7th	16	9	0	7	346	292	+54	6	50	
2014	11th	16	7	0	9	290	326	−36	4	32	
2015	3rd	16	10	1	5	373	323	+50	3	45	Lost qualifier to Brumbies
2016	3rd	15	10	1	4	440	274	+166	9	51	Lost quarter-final to Chiefs
2017	3rd	15	10	0	5	490	436	+54	3	43	Lost quarter-final to Chiefs
2018	11th	16	6	0	10	390	423	-33	5	29	
2019	10th	16	7	1	8	344	366	-22	5	35	
2020	7th	6	4	0	2	118	94	+24	1	17	Season cancelled due to the COVID-19 pandemic

Super Rugby Unlocked
Season	Pos	Pld	W	D	L	PF	PA	+/-	BP	Pts	Notes
2020	2nd	6	4	1	1	140	112	+28	1	19	Runners-up (no knockout rounds after round-robin stage)

Pro 14 Rainbow Cup SA
Season	Pos	Pld	W	D	L	PF	PA	+/-	BP	Pts	Notes
2021	2nd	6	2	1	3	137	143	-16	5	17	Failed to reach the Pro14 Rainbow Cup Final

United Rugby Championship
Season	Pos	Pld	W	D	L	PF	PA	+/-	BP	Pts	Notes
2021–22	2nd	18	12	2	4	464	311	+153	9	61	Champions (Won final against Bulls) South African Shield Winners
2022–23	3rd	18	12	2	4	531	378	+140	16	68	Runners-ups (Lost final to Munster) South African Shield Winners
2023–24	5th	18	12	0	6	468	348	+120	11	59	Lost quarter-final to Glasgow Warriors South African Shield Runners-up
2024–25	5th	18	10	0	8	507	418	+89	15	55	Lost quarter-final to Glasgow Warriors South African Shield Runners-up
2025–26	3rd	18	12	1	5	504	344	+160	10	60	Lost semi-final to Leinster 3rd in South African Shield

European Rugby Champions Cup
Season	Pos	Pld	W	D	L	PF	PA	+/-	BP	Pts	Notes
2022–23	3rd Pool B	4	3	0	1	106	68	+38	3	15	Lost quarter-final to Exeter Chiefs
2023–24	2nd Pool D	4	3	0	1	102	99	+3	2	14	Lost round of 16 to La Rochelle
2024–25	6th Pool 4	4	1	0	3	92	108	–16	1	5	Eliminated after the pool stage
2025–26	3rd Pool 3	4	3	0	1	117	125	–8	2	14	Lost round of 16 to Toulon

=== Currie Cup finals ===
Season	Winners	Score	Runner-up	Venue
1889	Western Province	n/a	n/a	n/a
1892	Western Province	n/a	n/a	n/a
1894	Western Province	n/a	n/a	n/a
1895	Western Province	n/a	n/a	n/a
1897	Western Province	n/a	n/a	n/a
1898	Western Province	n/a	n/a	n/a
1904	Western Province	n/a	n/a	n/a
1906	Western Province	n/a	n/a	n/a
1908	Western Province	n/a	n/a	n/a
1914	Western Province	n/a	n/a	n/a
1920	Western Province	n/a	n/a	n/a
1925	Western Province	n/a	n/a	n/a
1927	Western Province	n/a	n/a	n/a
1929	Western Province	n/a	n/a	n/a
1932	Border/Western Province	n/a	n/a	n/a
1934	Border/Western Province	n/a	n/a	n/a
1936	Western Province	n/a	n/a	n/a
1939	Transvaal^{1}	17–6	Western Province	Newlands, Cape Town
1946	Northern Transvaal	11–9	Western Province	Loftus Versfeld, Pretoria
1947	Western Province	16–12	Transvaal	Newlands, Cape Town
1950	Transvaal	22–11	Western Province	Ellis Park, Johannesburg
1954	Western Province	11–8	Northern Transvaal	Newlands, Cape Town
1957/59^{2}	Western Province	n/a	n/a	n/a
1969	Northern Transvaal	28–13	Western Province	Loftus Versfeld, Pretoria
1976	Orange Free State	33–16	Western Province	Free State Stadium, Bloemfontein
1979	Western Province	15–15	Northern Transvaal	Newlands, Cape Town
1980	Northern Transvaal	39–9	Western Province	Loftus Versfeld, Pretoria
1982	Western Province	24–7	Northern Transvaal	Newlands, Cape Town
1983	Western Province	9–3	Northern Transvaal	Loftus Versfeld, Pretoria
1984	Western Province	19–9	Sharks	Newlands, Cape Town
1985	Western Province	22–15	Northern Transvaal	Newlands, Cape Town
1986	Western Province	22–9	Transvaal	Newlands, Cape Town
1988	Northern Transvaal	19–18	Western Province	Loftus Versfeld, Pretoria
1989	Northern Transvaal	16–16	Western Province	Newlands, Cape Town
1995	Sharks	25–17	Western Province	Kings Park, Durban
1997	Western Province	14–12	Free State Cheetahs^{3}	Newlands, Cape Town
1998	Blue Bulls^{4}	24–20	Western Province	Loftus Versfeld, Pretoria
2000	Western Province	25–15	Sharks	ABSA Stadium, Durban
2001	Western Province	29–24	Sharks	Newlands, Cape Town
2010	Sharks	30–10	Western Province	ABSA Stadium, Durban
2012	Western Province	25–18	Sharks	ABSA Stadium, Durban
2013	Sharks	33–19	Western Province	Newlands, Cape Town
2014	Western Province	19–16	Golden Lions	Newlands, Cape Town
2015	Golden Lions	32–24	Western Province	Ellis Park, Johannesburg
2017	Western Province	33–21	Sharks	Growthpoint Stadium, Durban
2018	Sharks	17–12	Western Province	Newlands, Cape Town
