= 2020–21 Currie Cup Premier Division =

Domestic rugby union competition

- Countries: South Africa
- Date: 27 November 2020 – 30 January 2021
- Champions: Blue Bulls (24th title)
- Runners-up: Sharks
- Matches played: 22
- Tries scored: 115 (average 5.2 per match)
- Top point scorer: Curwin Bosch (Sharks, 84)
- Top try scorer: Eduan Keyter (Griquas, 4)

The 2020–21 Currie Cup Premier Division was the 82nd edition of the top tier of the Currie Cup, the premier domestic rugby union competition in South Africa. It was sponsored by beer brand Carling Black Label and organised by the South African Rugby Union. The competition was won by the Bulls, who beat the Sharks 26–19 after extra time in the final played at Loftus Versfeld, Pretoria on 30 January 2021.

Traditionally played in winter, the Currie Cup began later than usual in the 2020 season due to the COVID-19 pandemic, and extended into summer. The tournament was scheduled to start in late August, subject to government approval, but no rugby was allowed to be played in South Africa between mid March and late September 2020.

To satisfy commercial partners, a combined Currie Cup and domestic Super Rugby Unlocked tournament was created for the seven Premier Division teams. It was played over 16 weeks with all regular season matches counting towards one combined log of the team's standings. The Super Rugby Unlocked competition began in October and was played as a seven-week round-robin. All tournament points were then carried forward to the Currie Cup Premier Division, played from November 2020 to January 2021 and incorporating a return round-robin of matches followed by cup playoffs.

There was no First Division of the Currie Cup played in 2020. It was provisionally scheduled to be played in June and July, but was cancelled due to financial stress caused by the COVID-19 pandemic.

== Teams ==
Team locations in the 2020–21 Currie Cup Premier Division

The seven competing teams were:

2020–21 Currie Cup Premier Division
Team	Sponsored name
Blue Bulls	Vodacom Blue Bulls
Free State Cheetahs	Toyota Free State Cheetahs
Golden Lions	Xerox Golden Lions
Griquas	Tafel Lager Griquas
Pumas	Phakisa Pumas
Sharks	Cell C Sharks
Western Province	DHL Western Province

== Regular season ==
=== Format ===
The Currie Cup Premier Division competition began with a seven-week round-robin stage. Each team started with the log points from the final position of their union in the Super Rugby Unlocked competition that was played over the preceding seven weeks. The top four teams on the combined standings log at the end of the regular season qualified for the semifinals, which was followed by a final.

Tournament points in the standings were awarded to teams as follows:

- 4 points for a win.
- 2 points for a draw.
- 1 bonus point for a loss in a match by seven points or under.
- 1 bonus point for scoring three tries more than the opponent.

Teams were ranked in the standings firstly by tournament points then by: (a) points difference from all matches (points scored less points conceded); (b) tries difference from all matches (tries scored less tries conceded); (c) points difference from the matches between the tied teams; (d) points scored in all matches; (e) tries scored in all matches; and, if needed, (f) a coin toss.

=== Standings ===
Combined log of the regular season Currie Cup and Super Rugby Unlocked matches:

2020–21 Currie Cup standings
Pos	Team	Pld	W	D	L	PF	PA	PD	TF	TA	TB	LB	Pts	Qualification
1	Blue Bulls	12	8	1	3	305	216	+89	32	22	3	2	39	Semifinals
2	Western Province	12	7	2	3	272	216	+56	32	21	3	2	37	Semifinals
3	Sharks	12	7	2	3	274	244	+30	31	26	3	0	35	Semifinals
4	Golden Lions	12	6	2	4	275	221	+54	29	20	2	4	34	Semifinals
5	Free State Cheetahs	12	6	1	5	285	275	+10	30	28	3	2	31	
6	Pumas	12	3	1	8	265	351	−86	34	48	1	2	17	
7	Griquas	12	0	1	11	211	364	−153	24	47	0	6	8	

Source: springboks.rugby (Archived)

=== Round-by-round ===
The table below shows the progression of all teams throughout the Currie Cup season. Each team's tournament points on the standings log is shown for each round, with the overall log position in brackets.

All teams started with the log points carried over from their union's final position in the Super Rugby Unlocked competition.

2020–21 Currie Cup team progression
Team	SR	R1	R2	R3	R4	R5	R6	RM	R7	Semi	Final
Blue Bulls	23 (1st)	27 (1st)	32 (1st)	33 (1st)	35 (1st)	35 (1st)	35 (1st)	39 (1st)	39 (1st)	Won	Won
Western Province	19 (2nd)	20 (3rd)	21 (3rd)	26 (3rd)	26 (4th)	31 (2nd)	35 (2nd)	35 (2nd)	37 (2nd)	Lost	DNQ
Sharks	19 (3rd)	24 (2nd)	24 (2nd)	28 (2nd)	28 (4th)	28 (4th)	33 (4th)	33 (4th)	35 (3rd)	Won	Lost
Golden Lions	12 (5th)	16 (5th)	20 (4th)	25 (4th)	29 (3rd)	29 (3rd)	33 (3rd)	34 (3rd)	34 (4th)	Lost	DNQ
Free State Cheetahs	17 (4th)	17 (4th)	17 (5th)	17 (5th)	21 (5th)	26 (5th)	27 (5th)	27 (5th)	31 (5th)	DNQ	DNQ
Pumas	7 (6th)	7 (6th)	11 (6th)	11 (6th)	12 (6th)	12 (6th)	12 (6th)	12 (6th)	17 (6th)	DNQ	DNQ
Griquas	3 (7th)	4 (7th)	5 (7th)	5 (7th)	7 (7th)	7 (7th)	7 (7th)	7 (7th)	8 (7th)	DNQ	DNQ
Key:	Win	Draw	Loss	No match	Bye	SR = Super Rugby Unlocked points, RM = Rescheduled match					

=== Matches ===
For the first half of the provincial season, a round-robin of matches was played for Super Rugby Unlocked honours, with all tournament points carried forward to the Premier Division of the Currie Cup.

Listed below are all matches for the return round-robin, played for the 2020–21 Currie Cup Premier Division.

==== Round 1 ====
27 November 2020	Sharks	45–10	Pumas	Kings Park Stadium, Durban
19:00	Try: Ward (2) 7' c, 23'; Nkosi (2) 51' c 70' c Nohamba 17' c Van Vuuren 32'; Richardson 38' c Con: Bosch (5/7) 8' 18' 39'; 53' 71'; Cards: Bholi (YC) 64'	Summary; Report	Try: Maqondwana 50' c Con: Smuts (1/1) 50'; Pen: Smuts (1/1) 28'	Referee: Rasta Rasivhenge (South Africa)

28 November 2020	Griquas	17–20 (Note: The match between the Griquas and Golden Lions was abandoned after 53 minutes due to lightning strikes in the surrounding area. The match result was taken from the completed time played, with full points awarded.)	Golden Lions	Griqua Park, Kimberley
16:30	Try: Luus 7'; Keyter 23'; Verity-Amm 28' c Con: De Beer (1/3) 29'; Pen: De Beer (0/1)	Summary; Report	Try: Skosan (2) 35' 37' penalty try 44'; Con: Jantjies (0/2); Pen: Jantjies (1/1) 26'	Referee: Marius van der Westhuizen (South Africa)

28 November 2020	Western Province	20–22	Blue Bulls	Newlands Stadium, Cape Town
19:00	Try: Augustus 31' c Davids 58'; Van Rhyn 69'; Con: Willemse (1/2) 32'; Swiel (0/1); Pen: Willemse (1/3) 14'	Summary; Report	Try: Arendse (2) 7', 67' c Jansen van Vuren 76' c Con: Smith (2/3) 68' 77'; Pen: Smith (1/2) 43'; Cards: Van Rooyen (RC) 48'	Referee: AJ Jacobs (South Africa)

Bye/s: Free State Cheetahs

==== Round 2 ====
4 December 2020	Pumas	22–17	Griquas	Mbombela Stadium, Mbombela
19:00	Try: penalty try 20'; Obi 32' m Maartens 72' c Con: Smuts (1/2) 73'; Pen: Smuts (1/1) 12'	Summary	Try: Keyter 25' c, 77' c Con: de Beer (2/2) 26', 77'; Pen: de Beer (1/2) 44'	Referee: Stuart Berry (South Africa)

5 December 2020	Blue Bulls	40–13	Free State Cheetahs	Loftus Versfeld, Pretoria
16:30	Try: Papier 6' c van Staden (2) 51' c, 78' c Smith 67' c Con: Steyn (2/2) 7', 52'; Smith (2/2) 69', 79'; Pen: Steyn (4/4) 3', 21', 57', 62'	Summary Report	Try: Fortuin 36' c Con: Steyn (1/1) 37'; Pen: Steyn (2/3) 14', 27'	Referee: Jaco Peyper (South Africa)

5 December 2020	Golden Lions	22–19	Western Province	Ellis Park Stadium, Johannesburg
19:00	Try: Pienaar 71' c Con: Jantjies (1/1) 71'; Pen: Swanepoel (5/6) 18', 29', 50', 67', 80'; Jantjies (0/1)	Summary	Try: Senatla 52' c Con: Swiel (1/1) 53'; Pen: Swiel (4/5) 7', 23', 38', 42'	Referee: Griffin Colby (South Africa)

Bye/s: Sharks

==== Round 3 ====
11 December 2020	Western Province	28–14	Pumas	Newlands Stadium, Cape Town
19:00	Try: Ntubeni (2) 38' m, 48' m Davids 42' m Kitshoff 80' c Con: Wolhuter (1/4) 80'; Pen: Wolhuter (2/2) 31', 55'	Summary	Try: Cronjé 15' m Pen: Williams (3/3) 51', 61', 79'	Referee: Paul Mente (South Africa)

12 December 2020	Sharks	32–29	Blue Bulls	Kings Park Stadium, Durban
14:00	Try: Am 29' m van Vuuren 66' m Penxe 74' c Con: Bosch (1/3) 76'; Pen: Bosch (5/5) 13', 15', 26', 44', 58'	Summary Report	Try: van Staden 48' c Hendricks 62' c Con: Steyn (2/2) 49', 63'; Pen: Steyn (5/7) 8', 17', 38', 54', 56'	Referee: Marius van der Westhuizen (South Africa)

12 December 2020	Free State Cheetahs	23–39	Golden Lions	Free State Stadium, Bloemfontein
16:30	Try: de Haas 53' c van der Merwe 69' c Con: Schoeman (1/1) 55'; Steyn (1/1) 70'; Pen: Schoeman (2/2) 2', 16'; Steyn (1/1) 6'	Summary	Try: Alberts 26' c Warner (2) 41' m, 48' c du Plessis 50' c Orie 63' c Con: Jantjies (4/5) 27', 48', 51', 64'; Pen: Jantjies (2/4) 11', 36'	Referee: Rasta Rasivhenge (South Africa)

Bye/s: Griquas

==== Round 4 ====
18 December 2020	Pumas	31–35	Free State Cheetahs	Mbombela Stadium, Mbombela
19:00	Try: Westraadt 9'; Roets 31' c Maartens 44'; Engelbrecht 73' c Le Roux 80+1' c Con: Williams (1/3) 31'; Smuts (2/2) 73' 80+3'; Pen: Williams (0/2)	Summary	Try: Ntsila (2) 51' c, 58' c Small-Smith 26' c v.d. Westhuizen 64' c Meyer 76' c Con: Steyn (5/5) 27' 52' 59' 66' 78'; Pen: Steyn (0/1)	Referee: Rasta Rasivhenge (South Africa)

19 December 2020	Griquas	0–0 (Note: The match between the Griquas and Blue Bulls was cancelled after players from the Bulls returned positive tests for COVID-19 during the week before the game. The match was declared a draw, with each team awarded two points on the standings log.)	Blue Bulls	Griqua Park, Kimberley
16:30		Summary

19 December 2020	Golden Lions	27–12	Sharks	Ellis Park Stadium, Johannesburg
19:00	Try: Skosan 13' m Swanepoel 72' c Con: Jantjies (1/2) 74'; Pen: Jantjies (3/3) 2', 35', 62'; Swanepoel (2/2) 28', 52'	Summary	Pen: Bosch (4/4) 19', 22', 44', 62'	Referee: Jaco Peyper (South Africa)

Bye/s: Western Province

==== Round 5 ====
26 December 2020	Western Province	34–17	Griquas	Newlands Stadium, Cape Town
16:30		Summary		Referee: AJ Jacobs (South Africa)

27 December 2020	Free State Cheetahs	37–10	Sharks	Free State Stadium, Bloemfontein
16:30		Summary		Referee: Marius van der Westhuizen (South Africa)

(Note: The match between the Blue Bulls and Golden Lions was postponed by 11 days due to the threat of infection within the Bulls' squad.) 6 January 2021	Blue Bulls	22–15	Golden Lions	Loftus Versfeld, Pretoria
16:00	Try: Embrose Papier; Con: Chris Smith; Pen: Chris Smith (4); Cards: Marco van Staden	Summary	Pen: Tiaan Swanepoel (5); Cards: Ruan Dreyer	Referee: Cwengile Jadezweni (South Africa)

Bye/s: Pumas

==== Round 6 ====
2 January 2021	Pumas	25–33	Golden Lions	Mbombela Stadium, Mbombela
14:00		Summary		Referee: AJ Jacobs (South Africa)

2 January 2021	Sharks	47–19	Griquas	Kings Park Stadium, Durban
16:30		Summary		Referee: Cwengile Jadezweni (South Africa)

2 January 2021	Free State Cheetahs	29–31	Western Province	Free State Stadium, Bloemfontein
16:30		Summary		Referee: Stuart Berry (South Africa)

Bye/s: Blue Bulls

==== Round 7 ====
9 January 2021	Western Province	0–0 (Note: The match between Western Province and the Sharks was cancelled after members of the Sharks camp returned positive tests for COVID-19 during the week before the game. The match was declared a draw, with each team awarded two points on the standings log.)	Sharks	Newlands Stadium, Cape Town
14:15		Summary

9 January 2021	Griquas	18–22	Free State Cheetahs	Griqua Park, Kimberley
16:30		Summary		Referee: Aimee Barrett-Theron (South Africa)

10 January 2021	Pumas	44–14	Blue Bulls	Mbombela Stadium, Mbombela
16:00		report		Referee: Jaco Peyper (South Africa)

Bye/s: Golden Lions

== Play-offs ==
The play-off matches were rescheduled for a week later than previously planned to observe COVID-19 isolation protocols and maintain tournament integrity for the competing teams.

=== Semifinals ===
23 January 2021	Blue Bulls	26–21	Golden Lions	Loftus Versfeld, Pretoria
14:00	Try: Jacobs 10' m, 62' m Grobbelaar 56' c Con: Steyn (1/3) 57'; Pen: Steyn (3/4) 29', 40', 42'	Summary Report	Try: Alberts 44' c Simelane 46' c Odendaal 80' c Con: Jantjies (3/3) 45', 47', 80'	Referee: Marius van der Westhuizen

23 January 2021	Western Province	9–19	Sharks	Newlands Stadium, Cape Town
16:30	Pen: Swiel (3/3) 32', 38', 41'	Summary	Try: Van der Mescht 72' c Con: Bosch (1/1) 73'; Pen: Bosch (3/4) 3', 10', 12'; Drop: Bosch (1/2) 47'	Referee: Rasta Rasivhenge

=== Final ===
30 January 2021	Blue Bulls	26–19 (a.e.t.)	Sharks	Loftus Versfeld, Pretoria
15:00	Try: Botha 64' c, 99' c Con: Steyn (1/1) 64'; C. Smith (1/1) 100+1'; Pen: Steyn (3/4) 15', 24', 34'; C. Smith (1/2) 79'; Drop: C. Smith (0/1)	Summary; Report	Try: Nkosi 39'; Con: Bosch (1/1) 40'; Pen: Bosch (4/9) 6', 29', 43', 55'; Drop: Bosch (0/2)	Referee: Jaco Peyper

Blue Bulls	Sharks

Bulls:
FB	15	David Kriel
RW	14	Kurt-Lee Arendse
OC	13	Marco Jansen van Vuren
IC	12	Cornal Hendricks
LW	11	Stravino Jacobs
FH	10	Morné Steyn	(substituted off) 74'
SH	9	Ivan van Zyl	(substituted off) 59'
N8	8	Duane Vermeulen (c)
BF	7	Elrigh Louw	(substituted off) 55'
OF	6	Marco van Staden
RL	5	Ruan Nortjé
LL	4	Sintu Manjezi	(substituted off) 59'
TP	3	Trevor Nyakane	(substituted off) 59'
HK	2	Johan Grobbelaar	(substituted off) 90'
LP	1	Lizo Gqoboka	(substituted off) 59'
Substitutes:
HK	16	Schalk Erasmus	(substituted on) 90'
PR	17	Jacques van Rooyen	(substituted on) 59'
PR	18	Mornay Smith	(substituted on) 59'
LK	19	Jan Uys	(substituted on) 59'
BR	20	Arno Botha	(substituted on) 55'
SH	21	Embrose Papier	(substituted on) 59'
FH	22	Chris Smith	(substituted on) 74'
OB	23	Marnus Potgieter
Coach:
Jake White

Sharks:
FB	15	Aphelele Fassi
RW	14	Sbu Nkosi
OC	13	Lukhanyo Am (c)
IC	12	Marius Louw	(substituted off) 80'
LW	11	Yaw Penxe
FH	10	Curwin Bosch
SH	9	Jaden Hendrikse	(substituted off) 80'
N8	8	Sikhumbuzo Notshe
BF	7	Henco Venter
OF	6	Dylan Richardson	(substituted off) 64'
RL	5	Ruben van Heerden	(substituted off) 64'
LL	4	JJ van der Mescht
TP	3	Thomas du Toit	(substituted off) 88'
HK	2	Fez Mbatha	(substituted off) 51'
LP	1	Ox Nché	(substituted off) 79'
Substitutes:
HK	16	Dan Jooste	(substituted on) 51'
PR	17	Mzamo Majola	(substituted on) 79'
PR	18	Michael Kumbirai	(substituted on) 88'
LK	19	Hyron Andrews	(substituted on) 64'
FL	20	Thembelani Bholi	(substituted on) 64'
SH	21	Sanele Nohamba	(substituted on) 80'
CE	22	Jeremy Ward	(substituted on) 80'
FB	23	Manie Libbok
Coach:
Sean Everitt

Assistant Referees:
AJ Jacobs (South Africa)
Griffin Colby (South Africa)
Television match official:
Marius van der Westhuizen (South Africa)

== Players ==
=== Player statistics ===
Top point scorers
No	Player	Team	Points
1	Curwin Bosch	Sharks	84
2	François Steyn	Free State Cheetahs	76
3	Tiaan Swanepoel	Golden Lions	63
4	Morné Steyn	Bulls	62
5	Tim Swiel	Western Province	53
6	Elton Jantjies	Golden Lions	42

Top try scorers
No	Player	Team	Tries
1	Eduan Keyter	Griquas	4
2	Willie Engelbrecht	Pumas	3
2	Daniel Maartens	Pumas	3
2	Bongi Mbonambi	Western Province	3
2	Sbu Nkosi	Sharks	3
2	Yaw Penxe	Sharks	3

=== Team rosters ===
The respective team squads for the 2020–21 Currie Cup Premier Division were:

Blue Bulls squad
Forwards
- Tim Agaba
- Arno Botha
- Nizaam Carr
- Corniel Els
- Schalk Erasmus
- Lizo Gqoboka
- Johan Grobbelaar
- Elrigh Louw
- Sintu Manjezi
- Ruan Nortjé
- Trevor Nyakane
- Mornay Smith
- Gerhard Steenekamp
- Walt Steenkamp
- WJ Steenkamp
- Janko Swanepoel
- Jan Uys
- Muller Uys
- Marcel van der Merwe
- Jacques van Rooyen
- Marco van Staden
- Joe van Zyl
- Divan Venter
- Duane Vermeulen
- Jan-Hendrik Wessels
Backs
- Gio Aplon
- Kurt-Lee Arendse
- Stedman Gans
- Cornal Hendricks
- Travis Ismaiel
- Stravino Jacobs
- Marco Jansen van Vuren
- Keagan Johannes
- Dawid Kellerman
- David Kriel
- Kabelo Mokoena
- Jay-Cee Nel
- Embrose Papier
- Marnus Potgieter
- Chris Smith
- Morné Steyn
- Jade Stighling
- Clinton Swart
- Ivan van Zyl
Coach
- Jake White

Free State Cheetahs squad
Forwards
- Wilmar Arnoldi
- Aranos Coetzee
- George Cronjé
- Aidon Davis
- Cameron Dawson
- Erich de Jager
- Jacques du Toit
- Ian Groenewald
- Reniel Hugo
- Charles Marais
- Chris Massyn
- Khutha Mchunu
- Oupa Mohojé
- Andisa Ntsila
- Junior Pokomela
- Jeandré Rudolph
- Victor Sekekete
- Marnus van der Merwe
- Louis van der Westhuizen
- Conraad van Vuuren
- Hencus van Wyk
- Boan Venter
- Reinach Venter
- Carl Wegner
Backs
- Craig Barry
- Clayton Blommetjies
- Adriaan Carelse
- Carel-Jan Coetzee
- Ruben de Haas
- Reinhardt Fortuin
- Malcolm Jaer
- Rewan Kruger
- Tian Meyer
- Howard Mnisi
- Ruan Pienaar
- Duncan Saal
- Tian Schoeman
- William Small-Smith
- Chris Smit
- Rhyno Smith
- Rosko Specman
- François Steyn
- Dries Swanepoel
Coach
- Hawies Fourie

Griquas squad
Forwards
- Andrew Beerwinkel
- Ewan Coetzee
- CJ Conradie
- Fred Eksteen
- Carl Els
- Monde Hadebe
- John-Roy Jenkinson
- Niell Jordaan
- Zandré Jordaan
- Cameron Lindsay
- HJ Luus
- Madot Mabokela
- Khwezi Mkhafu
- Johan Momsen
- Nqoba Mxoli
- Bandisa Ndlovu
- NJ Oosthuizen
- Shaine Orderson
- Sibabalo Qoma
- Adré Smith
- Gideon van der Merwe
- Ewald van der Westhuizen
- Alandré van Rooyen
- CJ Velleman
- Tijde Visser
- Wendal Wehr
- Stefan Willemse
- Mzwanele Zito
Backs
- Ederies Arendse
- Masixole Banda
- Bjorn Basson
- Enver Brandt
- Zak Burger
- Ashlon Davids
- Tinus de Beer
- Earll Douwrie
- Johnathan Francke
- Daniel Kasende
- Eduan Keyter
- Berton Klaasen
- Harlon Klaasen
- Theo Maree
- Christiaan Meyer
- Raegan Oranje
- André Swarts
- James Verity-Amm
- George Whitehead
Coach
- Scott Mathie

Golden Lions squad
Forwards
- Willem Alberts
- PJ Botha
- Jan-Henning Campher
- Hacjivah Dayimani
- Ruan Dreyer
- Jannie du Plessis
- Wiehahn Herbst
- Francke Horn
- Jaco Kriel
- Len Massyn
- Nathan McBeth
- Reinhard Nothnagel
- Marvin Orie
- Asenathi Ntlabakanye
- MJ Pelser
- Carlü Sadie
- Marnus Schoeman
- Ruben Schoeman
- Sti Sithole
- Roelof Smit
- Dylan Smith
- Vincent Tshituka
- Wilhelm van der Sluys
- Dameon Venter
- Jaco Visagie
Backs
- Ross Cronjé
- Elton Jantjies
- Dan Kriel
- Gianni Lombard
- Rabz Maxwane
- James Mollentze
- Burger Odendaal
- Stean Pienaar
- Mannie Rass
- Divan Rossouw
- Wandisile Simelane
- Courtnall Skosan
- Dillon Smit
- Tiaan Swanepoel
- Jamba Ulengo
- Morné van den Berg
- EW Viljoen
- André Warner
Coach
- Ivan van Rooyen

Pumas squad
Forwards
- Heath Backhouse
- Marné Coetzee
- Stephan de Jager
- Kwanda Dimaza
- Willie Engelbrecht
- Wikus Groenewald
- Liam Hendricks
- Pieter Jansen van Vuren
- Marko Janse van Rensburg
- Francois Kleinhans
- Ruan Kramer
- Darrien Landsberg
- AJ le Roux
- Daniel Maartens
- Phumzile Maqondwana
- Dewald Maritz
- Morgan Naudé
- Ewart Potgieter
- Ig Prinsloo
- Le Roux Roets
- Hanru Sirgel
- Eduan Swart
- Brandon Valentyn
- HP van Schoor
- Simon Westraadt
Backs
- Dian Badenhorst
- Theo Boshoff
- Tiaan Botes
- Erich Cronjé
- Sebastian de Klerk
- Eddie Fouché
- Ruwellyn Isbell
- Morné Joubert
- Japie Kleinhans
- Tapiwa Mafura
- Niel Marais
- Neil Maritz
- Ali Mgijima
- Ryan Nell
- Luther Obi
- Chriswill September
- Ginter Smuts
- Giovan Snyman
- Etienne Taljaard
- Wayne van der Bank
- Alwayno Visagie
- Devon Williams
Coach
- Jimmy Stonehouse

Sharks squad
Forwards
- Hyron Andrews
- Thembelani Bholi
- Phepsi Buthelezi
- Zain Davids
- Thomas du Toit
- Andrew Evans
- Aston Fortuin
- Celimpilo Gumede
- Hanru Jacobs
- Dan Jooste
- Michael Kumbirai
- Cleopas Kundiona
- Mzamo Majola
- Fez Mbatha
- John-Hubert Meyer
- Khwezi Mona
- Ox Nché
- Sikhumbuzo Notshe
- Dylan Richardson
- Evan Roos
- Jordan Sesink-Clee
- JJ van der Mescht
- Emile van Heerden
- Ruben van Heerden
- Kerron van Vuuren
- Henco Venter
- James Venter
Backs
- Thaakir Abrahams
- Lukhanyo Am
- Curwin Bosch
- Jordan Chait
- Boeta Chamberlain
- Caleb Dingaan
- Muller du Plessis
- Aphelele Fassi
- Jaden Hendrikse
- Werner Kok
- Murray Koster
- Manie Libbok
- Marius Louw
- Sbu Nkosi
- Sanele Nohamba
- Yaw Penxe
- JP Pietersen
- Madosh Tambwe
- Anthony Volmink
- Jeremy Ward
- Grant Williams
- Cameron Wright
Coach
- Sean Everitt

Western Province squad
Forwards
- Juarno Augustus
- Kwenzo Blose
- Jaco Coetzee
- Ben-Jason Dixon
- Johan du Toit
- Pieter-Steph du Toit
- Neethling Fouché
- Steven Kitshoff
- Siya Kolisi
- JJ Kotze
- Leon Lyons
- Frans Malherbe
- Lee-Marvin Mazibuko
- Bongi Mbonambi
- David Meihuizen
- Salmaan Moerat
- Scarra Ntubeni
- Sazi Sandi
- JD Schickerling
- Chad Solomon
- Marcel Theunissen
- Ernst van Rhyn
- Chris van Zyl
- Ali Vermaak
- Nama Xaba
Backs
- Angelo Davids
- Paul de Wet
- Dan du Plessis
- Warrick Gelant
- Michal Haznar
- Lyle Hendricks
- Herschel Jantjies
- Tristan Leyds
- Godlen Masimla
- Matt More
- Ruhan Nel
- Sihle Njezula
- Sergeal Petersen
- Rikus Pretorius
- Seabelo Senatla
- Christopher Schreuder
- Cornel Smit
- Tim Swiel
- Edwill van der Merwe
- Abner van Reenen
- Damian Willemse
- Kade Wolhuter
- Leolin Zas
- Mnombo Zwelendaba
Coach
- John Dobson

== Referees ==
The following referees officiated matches in the competition:

2020–21 Currie Cup Premier Division referees
- Aimee Barrett-Theron
- Stuart Berry
- Griffin Colby
- AJ Jacobs
- Cwengile Jadezweni
- Paul Mente
- Jaco Peyper
- Rasta Rasivhenge
- Marius van der Westhuizen

== See also ==
- Super Rugby Unlocked
