= Super Rugby Unlocked =

Men's rugby union club competition

- Countries: South Africa
- Tournament format(s): Round-robin
- Champions: Bulls
- Matches played: 18
- Tries scored: 108 (6 per match)
- Top point scorer(s): Curwin Bosch, Sharks (63)
- Top try scorer(s): Stedman Gans, Bulls (5)
- Official website: Official site

Super Rugby Unlocked (known as Vodacom Super Rugby Unlocked for sponsorship reasons) was a professional rugby union competition played in South Africa from 10 October to 21 November 2020. Sponsored by communications company Vodacom, the tournament replaced the South African component of the incomplete 2020 Super Rugby season that was shut down in March of that year due to the COVID-19 pandemic.

Organised by the South African Rugby Union (SARU) as part of a combined Currie Cup and domestic Super Rugby tournament, the seven-team competition featured the Bulls, Lions, Sharks and Stormers from Super Rugby, with the addition of the Cheetahs, Griquas and Pumas.

The competition was won by the Bulls, who topped the standings of the seven-week round-robin tournament.

The former Super Rugby teams (the Bulls, Lions, Sharks and Stormers) would compete in the Rainbow Cup SA in May–June 2021 before being incorporated into the United Rugby Championship (URC) for the 2021–22 season.

== Format ==
The seven participating teams played each other once, home or away. The top-placed team at the end of that seven-week round-robin was awarded the Super Rugby Unlocked title.

All tournament points were then carried forward to the 2020–21 Currie Cup, incorporating a return round-robin of matches followed by cup playoffs.

Tournament points in the Super Rugby Unlocked standings were awarded to teams as follows:

- 4 points for a win.
- 2 points for a draw.
- 1 bonus point for a loss in a match by seven points or under.
- 1 bonus point for scoring three tries more than the opponent.

Teams were ranked firstly by tournament points, then number of matches won, overall points difference (points scored less points conceded), number of tries scored, overall try difference (tries scored less tries conceded) and, if needed, coin toss.

== Standings ==
Pos	Team	Pld	W	D	L	PF	PA	PD	TF	TA	TB	LB	Pts	Qualification
1	Bulls	6	5	0	1	178	92	+86	20	9	2	1	23	Champions
2	Stormers	6	4	1	1	140	112	+28	17	12	1	0	19	
3	Sharks	6	4	1	1	128	122	+6	13	14	1	0	19	
4	Cheetahs	6	3	1	2	126	106	+20	15	9	2	1	17	
5	Lions	6	1	2	3	119	103	+16	15	10	1	3	12	
6	Pumas	6	1	1	4	119	179	−60	15	25	0	1	7	
7	Griquas	6	0	0	6	123	219	−96	12	29	0	3	3	

Source: SA Rugby

== Matches ==
All matches for Super Rugby Unlocked are listed below:

=== Round 1 ===
9 October	Sharks	19–16	Lions	Jonsson Kings Park, Durban
19:00	Try: Werner Kok 5' c Con: Curwin Bosch (1/1) 6'; Pen: Curwin Bosch (4/4) 23', 30', 56', 73'	Report	Try: Jamba Ulengo 51' c Con: Elton Jantjies (1/1) 51'; Pen: Elton Jantjies (3/5) 33', 60', 70'	Referee: AJ Jacobs

10 October	Cheetahs	53–31	Pumas	Toyota Stadium, Bloemfontein
16:30	Try: Malcolm Jaer 2' c, 12' m, 57' m Junior Pokomela 16' c Rosko Specman 29' m, 31' c Ruan Pienaar 40+1' c William Small-Smith 42' c Con: Ruan Pienaar (5/8) 3', 16', 32', 40+2', 43'; Pen: Ruan Pienaar (1/1) 10'	Report	Try: Ginter Smuts 45' c Daniel Maartens 62' c Le Roux Roets 77' c Neil Maritz 80' c Con: Eddie Fouché (4/4) 46', 63', 78', 80+1'; Pen: Eddie Fouché (1/1) 7'	Referee: Jaco Peyper

10 October	Bulls	30–23	Griquas	Loftus Versfeld, Pretoria
19:00	Try: Ruan Nortjé 40+2' c Penalty try 56'; Arno Botha 69' c Con: Morné Steyn (2/2) 40+3', 69'; Pen: Morné Steyn (3/4) 38', 64', 74'	Report	Try: James Verity-Amm 26' c, 71' m Anthony Volmink 45' m Con: George Whitehead (1/3) 27'; Pen: George Whitehead (2/2) 10', 51'	Referee: Marius van der Westhuizen

Bye/s: Stormers

=== Round 2 ===
16 October	Cheetahs	19–17	Bulls	Toyota Stadium, Bloemfontein
19:00	Try: Rosko Specman 25' c Con: Tian Schoeman (1/1) 26'; Pen: Tian Schoeman (4/5) 16', 37', 56', 60'	Report	Try: Joe van Zyl 79' m Pen: Morné Steyn (3/3) 23', 52', 64'; Chris Smith (1/1) 70'	Referee: Cwengile Jadezweni

17 October	Griquas	21–27	Pumas	Tafel Lager Park, Kimberley
16:30	Try: Victor Sekekete 41' m Adré Smith 60' c Con: George Whitehead (1/2) 61'; Pen: George Whitehead (3/4) 7', 23', 74'	Report	Try: Ginter Smuts 20' c Etienne Taljaard 37' c Devon Williams 70' c Con: Eddie Fouché (3/3) 21', 39', 71'; Pen: Eddie Fouché (2/2) 31', 53'	Referee: AJ Jacobs

17 October	Stormers	23–17	Lions	DHL Newlands, Cape Town
19:00	Try: Rikus Pretorius 50' c Dan du Plessis 63' c Con: Damian Willemse (2/2) 52', 65'; Pen: Damian Willemse (3/5) 9', 35', 48'	Report	Try: Rabz Maxwane 10' c Elton Jantjies 71' c Con: Elton Jantjies (2/2) 11', 72'; Pen: Elton Jantjies (1/1) 7'	Referee: Rasta Rasivhenge

Bye/s: Sharks

=== Round 3 ===
23 October	Pumas	37–42	Stormers	Mbombela Stadium, Mbombela
19:00	Try: Neil Maritz 6' c, 51' c, Jeandré Rudolph 13' c, Wayne van der Bank 32' c Con: Eddie Fouché (2/2) 7', 14', Niel Marais (2/2) 34', 53'; Pen: Eddie Fouché (3/3) 2', 20', 23'	Report	Try: Rikus Pretorius 3' c, Herschel Jantjies 29' c, Neethling Fouche 62' c, Bongi Mbonambi 71' c, Leolin Zas 74' c, Warrick Gelant 78' c Con: Tim Swiel (6/6) 4', 30', 63', 72', 75', 79'	Referee: Marius van der Westhuizen

24 October	Lions	0–0 (Note: On 24 October, the match between the Lions and Cheetahs was postponed due to two positive COVID-19 cases found following a second batch of Coronavirus testing within the Lions squad, following earlier positive cases earlier in the week, and so falling in line with COVID-19 protocols. On 4 November, this game was declared as a 0–0 draw due to the inability to reschedule the match.)	Cheetahs	Emirates Airline Park, Johannesburg
16:30

24 October	Bulls	41–14	Sharks	Loftus Versfeld, Pretoria
19:00	Try: Stedman Gans 28' c, 56' c, Marco van Staden 32' c, 44' c, Marco Jansen van Vuren 77' m, Embrose Papier 80+2' m Con: Morné Steyn (4/4) 28', 33', 45', 57', Chris Smith (0/2); Pen: Morné Steyn (1/1) 19'; Drop: Morné Steyn (0/2)	Report	Try: Dylan Richardson 52' m Con: Curwin Bosch (0/1); Pen: Curwin Bosch (3/3) 11', 23', 37'	Referee: Jaco Peyper

Bye/s: Griquas

=== Round 4 ===
30 October	Lions	61–31	Griquas	Emirates Airline Park, Johannesburg
19:00	Try: Courtnall Skosan 10' c, 30' c, 79' m, Dan Kriel 16' c, Stean Pienaar 40' c, MJ Pelser 43' c, Jaco Visagie 49' c, Wandisile Simelane 70' c, Reinhard Nothnagel 78' c Con: Elton Jantjies (8/9) 11', 17', 31', 40+2', 44', 51', 71', 78'	Report	Try: Zak Burger 47' c, HJ Luus 54' c, James Verity-Amm 63' c, Tinus de Beer 74' c Con: George Whitehead (4/4) 47', 55', 64', 75'; Pen: George Whitehead (1/1) 24'	Referee: Marius van der Westhuizen

31 October	Pumas	19–42	Sharks	Mbombela Stadium, Mbombela
16:30	Try: Francois Kleinhans 27' c, Erich Cronjé 54' c, 72' m Con: Theo Boshoff (2/2) 28', 55'; Niel Marais (0/1)	Report	Try: Manie Libbok 2' c, Madosh Tambwe 13' c, Dan Jooste 19' c, Sbu Nkosi 40+1' c, Kerron van Vuuren 67' c, 78' c Con: Curwin Bosch (6/6) 3', 13', 21', 40+3', 69', 80'	Referee: Rasta Rasivhenge

31 October	Bulls	39–6 (Note: The match between the Bulls and Stormers was abandoned after 63 minutes due to lightning strikes in the surrounding area. The match result is taken from those 63 minutes played with full points awarded.)	Stormers	Loftus Versfeld, Pretoria
19:00	Try: Johan Grobbelaar 23' c, Stedman Gans 28' c, 50' c, Ivan van Zyl 34' m, Ruan Nortjé 37' c Con: Morné Steyn (4/5) 24', 30', 38', 51'; Pen: Morné Steyn (2/2) 3', 16'	Report	Pen: Damian Willemse (2/2) 5', 14'	Referee: AJ Jacobs

Bye/s: Cheetahs

=== Round 5 ===
6 November	Sharks	19–13	Cheetahs	Jonsson Kings Park, Durban
19:00	Try: Madosh Tambwe 76' c Con: Curwin Bosch (1/1) 78'; Pen: Curwin Bosch (4/4) 34', 40+2', 58', 80+1'	Report	Try: William Small-Smith 71' c Con: Tian Schoeman (1/1) 73'; Pen: Tian Schoeman (2/2) 49', 67'	Referee: Cwengile Jadezweni

7 November	Griquas	6–39	Stormers	Tafel Lager Park, Kimberley
16:30	Pen: Tinus de Beer (2/2) 13', 42'	Report	Try: Ernst van Rhyn 8' m, Neethling Fouche 34' c, Angelo Davids 47' m, Dan du Plessis 52' c, Juarno Augustus 65' m, Damian Willemse 72' c Con: Damian Willemse (3/6) 35', 54', 73'; Pen: Damian Willemse (1/1) 17'	Referee: Jaco Peyper

7 November	Lions	25–30	Bulls	Emirates Airline Park, Johannesburg
19:00	Try: Burger Odendaal 25' m, Morné van den Berg 39' c, Wandisile Simelane 66' c Con: Elton Jantjies (2/3) 40', 67'; Pen: Elton Jantjies (2/2) 3', 80+2'	Report	Try: Joe van Zyl 13' c, Stedman Gans 50' c, Kurt-Lee Arendse 71' c Con: Morné Steyn (3/3) 15', 50', 72'; Pen: Morné Steyn (3/3) 7', 43', 57'	Referee: Rasta Rasivhenge

Bye/s: Pumas

=== Round 6 ===
13 November	Griquas	33–34	Sharks	Tafel Lager Park, Kimberley
19:00	Try: Ederies Arendse 48' c, Eduan Keyter 53' c, Gideon van der Merwe 60' c Con: Tinus de Beer (3/3) 50', 54', 61'; Pen: Tinus de Beer (4/4) 6', 20', 27', 80'	Report	Try: Sanele Nohamba 12' c, Manie Libbok 56' c, Jeremy Ward 65' c, Dylan Richardson 67' c Con: Curwin Bosch (4/4) 13', 58', 66', 69'; Pen: Curwin Bosch (2/2) 44', 80+3; Drop: Curwin Bosch (0/1)	Referee: Griffin Colby

14 November	Lions	0–0 (Note: On 13 November, the match between the Lions and the Pumas was postponed due to two positive COVID-19 cases found in the second batch of Coronavirus testing within the Pumas squad, following an earlier positive test during the week.)	Pumas	Emirates Airline Park, Johannesburg
16:30

14 November	Stormers	30–13	Cheetahs	DHL Newlands, Cape Town
19:00	Try: Herschel Jantjies 6' c, Juarno Augustus 45' c, Warrick Gelant 75' c Con: Damian Willemse (3/3) 7', 47', 77'; Pen: Damian Willemse (2/2) 21', 70'; Drop: Damian Willemse (1/1) 40'	Report	Try: Rosko Specman 64' c Con: Tian Schoeman (1/1) 65'; Pen: Tian Schoeman (2/2) 32', 44'	Referee: Marius van der Westhuizen

Bye/s: Bulls

=== Round 7 ===
21 November	Bulls	21–5	Pumas	Loftus Versfeld, Pretoria
14:00	Try: Kurt-Lee Arendse 11' c, Chris Smith 17' c, Ivan van Zyl 24' c Con: Chris Smith (3/3) 12', 18', 26'	Report	Try: HP van Schoor 47' m Con: Theo Boshoff (0/1)	Referee: Aimee Barrett-Theron

21 November	Cheetahs	28–9	Griquas	Toyota Stadium, Bloemfontein
16:30	Try: Andisa Ntsila 3' m, Howard Mnisi 49' m, Ruben de Haas 74' m, Jeandré Rudolph 79' c Con: Tian Schoeman (0/3), Reinhardt Fortuin (1/1) 80+1'; Pen: Tian Schoeman (2/2) 16', 62'	Report	Pen: Tinus de Beer (3/3) 13', 24', 36'	Referee: AJ Jacobs

21 November	Sharks	0–0 (Note: On 17 November, the match between the Sharks and the Stormers was postponed following positive COVID-19 tests within the Sharks squad. The match between the Bulls and the Pumas was also moved from 20 November to 21 November for player welfare reasons.)	Stormers	Jonsson Kings Park, Durban
19:00

Bye/s: Lions

== Statistics ==
Top point scorers
No	Player	Team	Points
1	Curwin Bosch	Sharks	63
2	Morné Steyn	Bulls	62
3	Elton Jantjies	Lions	49
4	Damian Willemse	Stormers	48
5	Tinus de Beer	Griquas	38
6	Eddie Fouché	Pumas	36
6	Tian Schoeman	Cheetahs	36
7	George Whitehead	Griquas	30
8	Stedman Gans	Bulls	25
9	Neil Maritz	Pumas	20
9	Rosko Specman	Cheetahs	20

Top try scorers
No	Player	Team	Tries
1	Stedman Gans	Bulls	5
2	Neil Maritz	Pumas	4
2	Rosko Specman	Cheetahs	4
3	Malcolm Jaer	Cheetahs	3
3	James Verity-Amm	Griquas	3

== Squads ==
Bulls squad
Forwards	Tim Agaba • Arno Botha • Nizaam Carr • Corniel Els • Schalk Erasmus • Lizo Gqoboka • Johan Grobbelaar • Jason Jenkins • Juandré Kruger • Elrigh Louw • Sintu Manjezi • Ruan Nortjé • Trevor Nyakane • Mornay Smith • Gerhard Steenekamp • Walt Steenkamp • Jan Uys • Muller Uys • Marcel van der Merwe • Jacques van Rooyen • Joe van Zyl • Duane Vermeulen • Jan-Hendrik Wessels
Backs	Gio Aplon • Kurt-Lee Arendse • Stedman Gans • Cornal Hendricks • Travis Ismaiel • Stravino Jacobs • Marco Jansen van Vuren • David Kriel • Embrose Papier • Chris Smith • Morné Steyn • Jade Stighling • Clinton Swart • Ivan van Zyl
Coach	Jake White

Cheetahs squad
Forwards	Wilmar Arnoldi • Aranos Coetzee • George Cronjé • Aidon Davis • Cameron Dawson • Luan de Bruin • Erich de Jager • JP du Preez • Jacques du Toit • Ian Groenewald • Reniel Hugo • Charles Marais • Chris Massyn • Khutha Mchunu • Oupa Mohojé • Andisa Ntsila • Junior Pokomela • Jeandré Rudolph • Victor Sekekete • Walt Steenkamp • Marnus van der Merwe • Louis van der Westhuizen • Hencus van Wyk • Boan Venter • Reinach Venter • Carl Wegner • Jasper Wiese
Backs	Craig Barry • Clayton Blommetjies • Adriaan Carelse • Carel-Jan Coetzee • Ruben de Haas • Reinhardt Fortuin • Malcolm Jaer • Benhard Janse van Rensburg • Rewan Kruger • Tapiwa Mafura • Tian Meyer • Howard Mnisi • Ruan Pienaar • Duncan Saal • Tian Schoeman • William Small-Smith • Chris Smit • Rhyno Smith • Rosko Specman • François Steyn • Dries Swanepoel
Coach	Hawies Fourie

Griquas squad
Forwards	Andrew Beerwinkel • Ewan Coetzee • CJ Conradie • Fred Eksteen • Carl Els • Ian Groenewald • Monde Hadebe • John-Roy Jenkinson • Niell Jordaan • Zandré Jordaan • Sias Koen • Cameron Lindsay • HJ Luus • Madot Mabokela • Khwezi Mkhafu • Johan Momsen • Khwezi Mona • Nqoba Mxoli • Bandisa Ndlovu • NJ Oosthuizen • Shaine Orderson • Sibabalo Qoma • Victor Sekekete • Adré Smith • Gideon van der Merwe • Ewald van der Westhuizen • Alandré van Rooyen • CJ Velleman • Wendal Wehr • Stefan Willemse • Mzwanele Zito
Backs	Ederies Arendse • Masixole Banda • Bjorn Basson • Enver Brandt • Zak Burger • Ashlon Davids • Tinus de Beer • Earll Douwrie • Johnathan Francke • Daniel Kasende • Eduan Keyter • Berton Klaasen • Harlon Klaasen • Theo Maree • Christiaan Meyer • Chriswill September • André Swarts • James Verity-Amm • Anthony Volmink • George Whitehead
Coach	Scott Mathie

Lions squad
Forwards	Willem Alberts • PJ Botha • Jan-Henning Campher • Hacjivah Dayimani • Ruan Dreyer • Jannie du Plessis • Wiehahn Herbst • Francke Horn • Jaco Kriel • Len Massyn • Nathan McBeth • Reinhard Nothnagel • Marvin Orie • Asenathi Ntlabakanye • MJ Pelser • Carlü Sadie • Marnus Schoeman • Ruben Schoeman • Sti Sithole • Roelof Smit • Dylan Smith • Vincent Tshituka • Wilhelm van der Sluys • Jaco Visagie
Backs	Ross Cronjé • Elton Jantjies • Dan Kriel • Gianni Lombard • Rabz Maxwane • Burger Odendaal • Stean Pienaar • Mannie Rass • Divan Rossouw • Wandisile Simelane • Courtnall Skosan • Dillon Smit • Tiaan Swanepoel • Jamba Ulengo • Morné van den Berg • EW Viljoen • André Warner
Coach	Ivan van Rooyen

Pumas squad
Forwards	Heath Backhouse • Marné Coetzee • Stephan de Jager • Kwanda Dimaza • Willie Engelbrecht • Wikus Groenewald • Liam Hendricks • Pieter Jansen van Vuren • Marko Janse van Rensburg • Francois Kleinhans • Ruan Kramer • Darrien Landsberg • AJ le Roux • Cameron Lindsay • Daniel Maartens • Phumzile Maqondwana • Dewald Maritz • Morgan Naudé • Ewart Potgieter • Ig Prinsloo • Le Roux Roets • Jeandré Rudolph • Hanru Sirgel • Brandon Valentyn • HP van Schoor • Simon Westraadt
Backs	Dian Badenhorst • Theo Boshoff • Erich Cronjé • Eddie Fouché • Ruwellyn Isbell • Morné Joubert • Japie Kleinhans • Tapiwa Mafura • Niel Marais • Neil Maritz • Ali Mgijima • Ryan Nell • Luther Obi • Chriswill September • Ginter Smuts • Giovan Snyman • Etienne Taljaard • Wayne van der Bank • Alwayno Visagie • Devon Williams
Coach	Jimmy Stonehouse

Sharks squad
Forwards	Hyron Andrews • Thembelani Bholi • Craig Burden • Phepsi Buthelezi • Zain Davids • Thomas du Toit • Andrew Evans • Celimpilo Gumede • Hanro Jacobs • Dan Jooste • Michael Kumbirai • Cleopas Kundiona • Mzamo Majola • Fez Mbatha • Khutha Mchunu • John-Hubert Meyer • Khwezi Mona • Tera Mtembu • Ox Nché • Sikhumbuzo Notshe • Dylan Richardson • Evan Roos • JJ van der Mescht • Emile van Heerden • Ruben van Heerden • Kerron van Vuuren • Henco Venter • James Venter
Backs	Thaakir Abrahams • Lukhanyo Am • Curwin Bosch • Jordan Chait • Boeta Chamberlain • Caleb Dingaan • Muller du Plessis • Aphelele Fassi • Jaden Hendrikse • Werner Kok • Murray Koster • Manie Libbok • Marius Louw • Sbu Nkosi • Sanele Nohamba • Yaw Penxe • JP Pietersen • Madosh Tambwe • Anthony Volmink • Jeremy Ward • Grant Williams • Cameron Wright
Coach	Sean Everitt

Stormers squad
Forwards	Juarno Augustus • Kwenzo Blose • Jaco Coetzee • Ben-Jason Dixon • Johan du Toit • Pieter-Steph du Toit • Neethling Fouché • Steven Kitshoff • Siya Kolisi • JJ Kotze • Leon Lyons • Frans Malherbe • Bongi Mbonambi • David Meihuizen • Salmaan Moerat • Scarra Ntubeni • Sazi Sandi • JD Schickerling • Chad Solomon • Marcel Theunissen • Ernst van Rhyn • Chris van Zyl • Nama Xaba
Backs	Angelo Davids • Paul de Wet • Dan du Plessis • Ryno Eksteen • Warrick Gelant • Michal Haznar • Lyle Hendricks • Herschel Jantjies • Tristan Leyds • Godlen Masimla • Matt More • Ruhan Nel • Sihle Njezula • Sergeal Petersen • Rikus Pretorius • Seabelo Senatla • Christopher Schreuder • Cornel Smit • Tim Swiel • Edwill van der Merwe • Abner van Reenen • Damian Willemse • Kade Wolhuter • Leolin Zas • Mnombo Zwelendaba
Coach	John Dobson

== See also ==
- 2020–21 Currie Cup Premier Division
- Super Rugby Aotearoa
- Super Rugby AU
