= Preparation Series =

South African rugby union tournament

- Countries: South Africa
- Date: 26 February 2021 – 28 March 2021
- Matches played: 16
- Attendance: 0 (average 0 per match)
- Top point scorer: Kade Wolhuter (Stormers, 47)
- Top try scorer: HJ Luus (Griquas) & Joe van Zyl (Bulls) (both 4)

The Preparation Series was a South African rugby union tournament organised by SA Rugby. The tournament was used to be a number of preparation fixtures were announced by SA Rugby. It served as preparation for the 2021 British & Irish Lions tour to South Africa and South African teams entering the Pro14 Rainbow Cup, who had missed out on significant rugby game time due to the COVID-19 pandemic. 8 sides took part in the competition; the four joining the Pro14 Rainbow Cup (the Bulls, the Lions, the Sharks and the Stormers), along with the Cheetahs, Griquas and Pumas, who had taken part in Super Rugby Unlocked and the 2020–21 Currie Cup Premier Division, and the Eastern Province Elephants who had not played any competitive rugby since the 2019 Currie Cup First Division.

Although there was no trophy for this tournament, the Bulls ended up in top spot in Pool A and the Sharks topped in pool B.

== Regular season ==
=== Format ===
The eight teams have been split into two groups and will play cross-pool matches. Each team played four matches. Two at home and two away. The tournament spanned from Friday, 26 February until Sunday, 28 March.

=== Standings ===
==== Pool A ====
Preparation Series Pool A
	Team	Played	Won	Drawn	Lost	Points For	Points Against	Points Difference	Tries For	Tries Against	Bonus Points	Points
1	Bulls	4	3	0	1	181	115	+66	26	14	3	15
2	Cheetahs	4	3	0	1	159	105	+54	20	12	2	14
3	Lions	4	3	0	1	141	136	+5	18	18	1	13
4	Griquas	4	2	0	2	108	195	+13	13	13	2	10

==== Pool B ====
Preparation Series Pool B
	Team	Played	Won	Drawn	Lost	Points For	Points Against	Points Difference	Tries For	Tries Against	Bonus Points	Points
1	Sharks	4	2	0	2	158	104	+54	24	14	4	12
2	Stormers	4	2	0	2	144	112	+32	15	15	3	11
3	Pumas	4	1	0	3	103	118	−15	11	10	2	6
4	Eastern Province Elephants	4	0	0	4	46	255	−209	7	38	0	0

== Matches ==
=== Round 1 ===
26 February 2021	Lions	32–28	Pumas	Emirates Airline Park, Johannesburg
19:00		Summary		Attendance: Behind closed doors Referee: Jaco Peyper

27 February 2021	Stormers	33–34	Cheetahs	Cape Town Stadium, Cape Town
17:15		Summary		Attendance: Behind closed doors Referee: Rasta Rasivhenge

28 February 2021	Bulls	87–10	Eastern Province Elephants	Loftus Versfeld, Pretoria
15:00	Try: Nizaam Carr (2); Stravino Jacobs (2); Joe van Zyl; Marco Jansen van Vuren; David Kriel; Tim Agaba; Marnus Potgieter; Keagan Johannes (2); Jandre Burger; Con: Chris Smith (9); Jandre Burger (3); Pen: Chris Smith	Summary; Report	Try: Sithembiso Befile; Con: Inny Radebe; Pen: Inny Radebe	Attendance: Behind closed doors Referee: Stuart Berry

28 February 2021	Sharks	35–10	Griquas	Jonsson Kings Park, Durban
17:15		Summary		Attendance: Behind closed doors Referee: AJ Jacobs

=== Round 2 ===
9 March 2021	Griquas	32–38	Stormers	Tafel Lager Park, Kimberley
16:45		Summary		Attendance: Behind closed doors Referee: Griffin Colby

9 March 2021	Pumas	31–48	Bulls	Mbombela Stadium, Mbombela
19:00	Try: Francois Kleinhans, Brandon Valentyn, Penalty Try, Dewald Maritz; Con: Neil Marais (2), Eddie Fouché; Pen: Neil Marais	Summary	Try: Joe van Zyl (2), Stravino Jacobs, Gerhard Steenekamp, Mornay Smith, Marnus Potgieter, Janco Uys; Con: Chris Smith (5); Pen: Chris Smith	Attendance: Behind closed doors Referee: Rasta Rasivhenge

10 March 2021	Eastern Province Elephants	24–54	Lions	Nelson Mandela Bay Stadium, Port Elizabeth
16:45		Summary		Attendance: Behind closed doors Referee: AJ Jacobs

10 March 2021	Cheetahs	39–38	Sharks	Toyota Stadium, Bloemfontein
19:00		Summary		Attendance: Behind closed doors Referee: Marius van der Westhuizen

=== Round 3 ===
17 March 2021	Eastern Province Elephants	0–43	Griquas	Nelson Mandela Bay Stadium, Port Elizabeth
19:00		Summary		Attendance: Behind closed doors Referee: Cwengile Jadezweni

19 March 2021	Pumas	22–15	Cheetahs	Mbombela Stadium, Mbombela
16:45		Summary		Attendance: Behind closed doors Referee: Stuart Berry

19 March 2021	Bulls	34–29	Stormers	Loftus Versfeld, Pretoria
19:00	Try: Richard Kriel, Joe van Zyl, Marco Jansen van Vuren, Ruan Nortjé, Penalty try Con: Chris Smith (2); Pen: Morne Steyn	Summary	Try: Leolin Zas (2); Con: Kade Wolhuter (2); Pen: Kade Wolhuter (3), Tim Swiel (2)	Attendance: Behind closed doors Referee: AJ Jacobs

20 March 2021	Lions	43–40	Sharks	Emirates Airline Park, Johannesburg
16:15		Summary		Attendance: Behind closed doors Referee: Rasta Rasivhenge

=== Round 4 ===
26 March 2021	Sharks	45–12	Bulls	Jonsson Kings Park, Durban
19:00	Try: Fez Mbatha, Penalty Try, Siya Kolisi, Marius Louw, Ox Nche, Rynhardt Jonker, Sanele Nohamba; Con: Boeta Chamberlain (3), Sanele Nohamba	Summary	Try: Nizaam Carr, Dawid Kellerman; Con: Morné Steyn	Attendance: Behind closed doors Referee: Marius van der Westhuizen

27 March 2021	Griquas	23–22	Pumas	Tafel Lager Park, Kimberley
15:00		Summary		Attendance: Behind closed doors Referee: Cwengile Jadezweni

27 March 2021	Stormers	44–12	Lions	Cape Town Stadium, Cape Town
17:15		Summary		Attendance: Behind closed doors Referee: AJ Jacobs

28 March 2021	Cheetahs	71–12	Eastern Province Elephants	Toyota Stadium, Bloemfontein
15:00		Summary		Attendance: Behind closed doors Referee: Rasta Rasivhenge

== Player statistics ==
Top point scorers
No	Player	Team	Points
1	Kade Wolhuter	Stormers	47
2	Eddie Fouché	Pumas	40
3	Chris Smith	Bulls	38
3	Tiaan Swanepoel	Lions	38
4	François Steyn	Cheetahs	31
5	Ruan Pienaar	Cheetahs	26

Top try scorers
No	Player	Team	Tries
1	HJ Luus	Griquas	4
1	Joe van Zyl	Bulls	4
2	Wilmar Arnoldi	Cheetahs	3
2	Rosko Specman	Cheetahs	3
2	Gideon van der Merwe	Griquas	3
2	Leolin Zas	Stormers	3

== See also ==
- 2021 British & Irish Lions Tour to South Africa
- Pro14 Rainbow Cup
