= Japie Kleinhans =

South African rugby union player

- Full name: Japie Kleinhans
- Born: South Africa

Rugby union career
- Position: Centre / Wing / Fullback
Senior career
Years	Team	Apps	(Points)
2019	Pumas	1	(0)
2019	Leopards	3	(10)
2020–	Pumas	2	(0)
- Correct as of 10 July 2022

Japie Kleinhans is a South African rugby union player for the Pumas in the Currie Cup. His regular position is centre, wing or fullback.

Kleinhans was named in the Pumas squad for the Super Rugby Unlocked and 2020 Currie Cup Premier Division competitions. He made his debut in Round 3 of the 2020 Currie Cup Premier Division against the Western Province.
