= Hanro Jacobs =

South African rugby union player

- Full name: Hanro Jacobs
- Born: 14 March 2000 (age 26) Strand, South Africa
- Height: 1.86 m (6 ft 1 in)
- Weight: 122 kg (269 lb)

Rugby union career
- Position: Prop
- Current team: Sharks / Sharks (Currie Cup)
Senior career
Years	Team	Apps	(Points)
2020–	Sharks	42	(20)
2020–	Sharks (Currie Cup)	2	(0)
- Correct as of 30 March 2024
International career
Years	Team	Apps	(Points)
2026	South Africa 'A'	1	(0)
- Correct as of 24 June 2026

Hanro Jacobs (born 14 March 2000) is a South African rugby union player for the Sharks in Super Rugby and the Sharks in the Currie Cup. His regular position is prop.

Jacobs was named in the Sharks squad for both the Super Rugby Unlocked competition. Jacobs made his Sharks debut in Round 1 of the 2020 Currie Cup Premier Division against the Pumas.
