= Marco Jansen van Vuren =

South African rugby union player

- Born: 14 June 1996 (age 30) Vanderbijlpark, South Africa
- Height: 1.88 m (6 ft 2 in)
- Weight: 88 kg (13 st 12 lb; 194 lb)
- School: Hoërskool Transvalia, Vanderbijlpark

Rugby union career
- Position: Scrum-half / Centre / Wing
- Current team: Bulls / Blue Bulls
Youth career
- 2009–2014: Falcons
- 2014–2017: Golden Lions
Senior career
| Years | Team | Apps | (Points) |
| 2015–2018 | Golden Lions XV | 15 | (5) |
| 2017–2018 | Golden Lions | 12 | (15) |
| 2018 | Lions | 4 | (0) |
| 2019 | Falcons | 1 | (0) |
| 2020– | Bulls | 11 | (5) |
| 2020– | Blue Bulls | 13 | (10) |
- Correct as of 23 July 2022
International career
| Years | Team | Apps | (Points) |
| 2013–2014 | South Africa Schools | 4 | (0) |
| 2015–2016 | South Africa Under-20 | 6 | (0) |
- Correct as of 17 April 2018

Marco Jansen van Vuren (born 14 June 1996 in Vanderbijlpark, South Africa) is a South African rugby union player for the Cheetahs in the Currie Cup. His regular position is scrum-half, but also regularly plays centre and wing

== Career ==
=== 2009–14 ===
Jansen van Vuren first earned a provincial call-up at primary school level in 2009, when he was included in the Falcons' Under-13 Craven Week side. In 2012, he was once again selected by the union to play at the Under-16 Grant Khomo Week competition, where he made three appearances.

He then played in the premier high school rugby union competition in South Africa, the Under-18 Craven Week held in Polokwane in 2013, scoring a try in their match against Griquas Country Districts. After the competition, he was included in the 2013 South African Schools squad and he started for them in their 14–13 victory over Wales in Worcester.

He again played at the Craven Week in Middelburg in 2014, scoring a try against Boland during the tournament, and was once again included in the South African Schools side for 2014. He started against France, played off the bench against Wales and started their third match against England.

=== 2014– ===
He made one appearance for the Golden Lions U19 side during the 2014 Under-19 Provincial Championship before officially joining their academy for 2015. He made his first class debut for them on 13 March 2015 in their 2015 Vodacom Cup match against the Limpopo Blue Bulls, helping them to a 31–21 victory.

He was named in a 37-man training squad for the South Africa national under-20 rugby union team and was an unused replacement for them in a friendly match against a Varsity Cup Dream Team in April 2015. He was then included in the squad that embarked on a two-match tour of Argentina. He started their first match of the tour, a 25–22 victory over Argentina but didn't feature in their 39–28 victory a few days later.

Upon the team's return, he was named in the final squad for the 2015 World Rugby Under 20 Championship. He came on as a replacement in all three of their matches in Pool B of the competition; a 33–5 win against hosts Italy, a 40–8 win against Samoa and a 46–13 win over Australia to help South Africa finish top of Pool B to qualify for the semi-finals with the best record pool stage of all the teams in the competition. Jansen van Vuren was named on the bench for both their semi-final match against England, which they lost 20–28 to be eliminated from the competition by England for the second year in succession and their third-place play-off match against France, where South Africa achieved a 31–18 win to secure third place in the competition, but failed to get game time in either match.

In March 2016, Jansen van Vuren was once again included in a South Africa Under-20 training squad, and made the cut to be named in a reduced provisional squad a week later. On 10 May 2016, he was included in the final squad for the 2016 World Rugby Under 20 Championship tournament to be held in Manchester, England. He wasn't included in their matchday squad for their opening match in Pool C of the tournament as South Africa came from behind to beat Japan 59–19, but came on as a replacement in their next pool match as South Africa were beaten 13–19 by Argentina. He dropped out of the 23 as South Africa bounced back to secure a 40-31 bonus-point victory over France in their final pool match to secure a semi-final place as the best runner-up in the competition. He started both of their matches in the play-offs, firstly as South Africa faced three-time champions England in the semi-finals – with the hosts proving too strong for South Africa, knocking them out of the competition with a 39–17 victory - and then against Argentina in the third-place play-off final. Argentina beat South Africa – as they did in the pool stages – convincingly winning 49–19 and in the process condemning South Africa to fourth place in the competition.

== Honours ==
- Super Rugby Unlocked winner 2020
- Currie Cup winner 2020–21
- Pro14 Rainbow Cup runner-up 2021
