= Stravino Jacobs =

South African rugby union player

- Full name: Stravino Jacobs
- Born: 21 February 2000 (age 26) South Africa
- School: Paarl Gimnasium

Rugby union career
- Position: Centre / Wing
- Current team: Bulls / Blue Bulls
Youth career
- 2018: Western Province
Senior career
Years	Team	Apps	(Points)
2020–	Bulls	8	(10)
2020–	Blue Bulls	12	(30)
- Correct as of 23 July 2022

Stravino Jacobs (born 21 February 2000) is a South African professional rugby union player for the Bulls in United Rugby Championship and the Blue Bulls in the Currie Cup. His regular position is centre or wing.

Jabobs was named in the Bulls squad for the Super Rugby Unlocked competition. He made his debut for the Blue Bulls in Round 5 of the 2020–21 Currie Cup Premier Division against the Golden Lions.

== Honours ==
- Currie Cup winner 2020–21, 2021
- Pro14 Rainbow Cup runner-up 2021
