= Francke Horn =

South African rugby union player

- Full name: Francke Horn
- Born: 24 May 1999 (age 27) Stellenbosch,South Africa
- Height: 1.90 m (6 ft 3 in)
- Weight: 103 kg (227 lb)
- School: Paarl Boys' High School
- Notable relative: Francois Horn (father)

Rugby union career
- Position: Number eight
- Current team: Lions / Golden Lions
Senior career
Years	Team	Apps	(Points)
2020–	Lions	99	(160)
2020–	Golden Lions	18	(10)
- Correct as of 3 November 2026
International career
Years	Team	Apps	(Points)
2018–2019	South Africa U20	1	(5)

Francke Horn (born 24 May 1999) is a South African professional rugby union player who plays for and captains the Lions in the United Rugby Championship and the Golden Lions in the Currie Cup. His regular position is Number eight.

== Club career ==
Lions

Horn made his debut for the Lions in the Super Rugby Unlocked competition in 2020. He made his debut for the Golden Lions in Round 5 of the 2020–21 Currie Cup Premier Division against the Blue Bulls.

On 5 July 2021, Horn captained the Lions against the British & Irish Lions at Emirates Airline Park where they lost 14-56.
