= Ruan Nortjé =

South African rugby union player

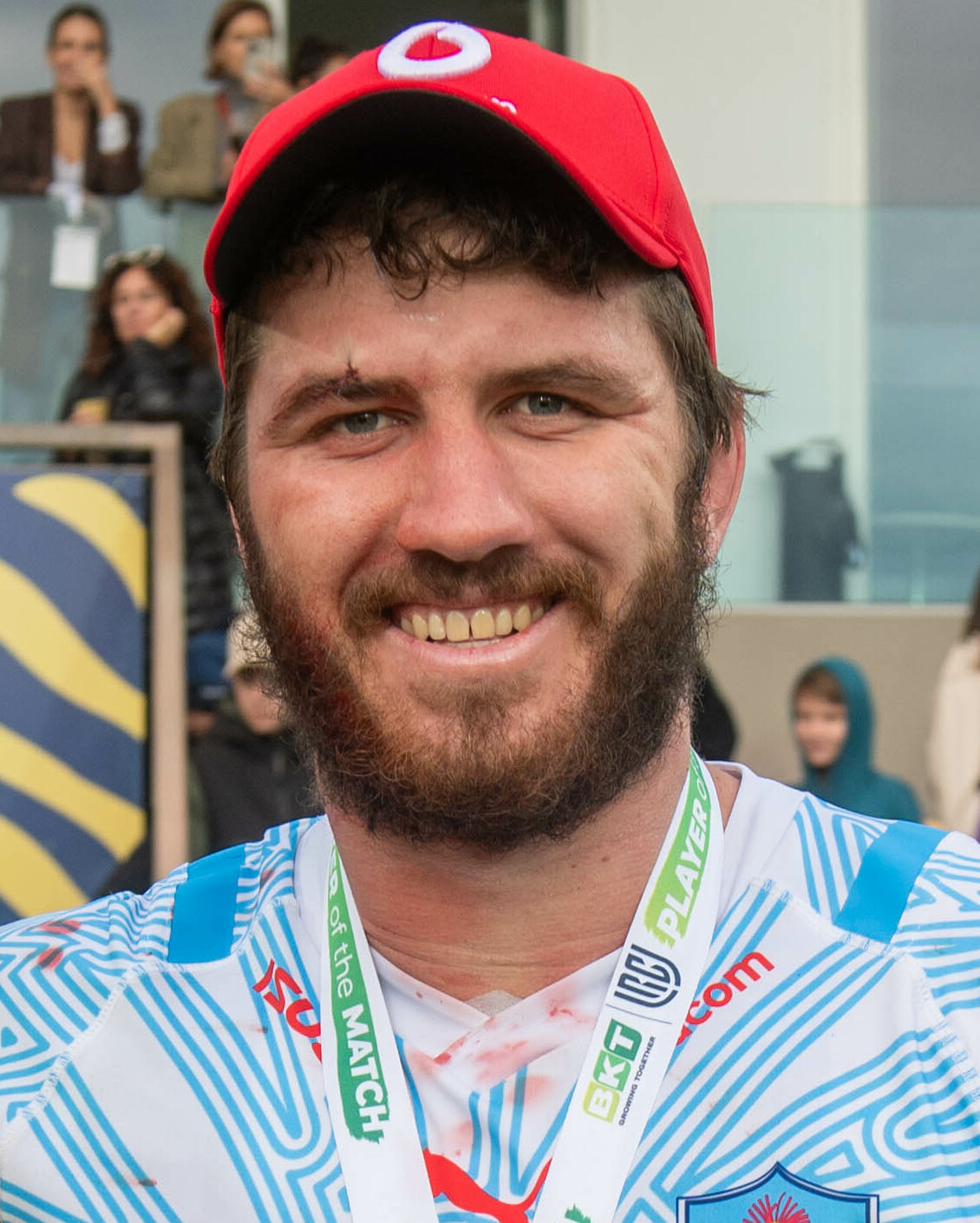
- Born: 25 July 1998 (age 28) Pretoria, South Africa
- Height: 2.00 m (6 ft 6 1/2 in)
- Weight: 113 kg (249 lb; 17 st 11 lb)
- School: Die Hoërskool Wonderboom
- University: University of Pretoria
- Notable relative: Linda Nortje (spouse)

Rugby union career
- Position(s): Lock, Flanker
- Current team: Kubota Spears
Youth career
- 2016–2019: Blue Bulls
Senior career
| Years | Team | Apps | (Points) |
| 2018–2019 | Blue Bulls XV | 8 | (0) |
| 2018–2026 | Bulls | 85 | (55) |
| 2018–2026 | Blue Bulls | 30 | (5) |
| 2026– | Kubota Spears | | |
- Correct as of 31 August 2024
International career
| Years | Team | Apps | (Points) |
| 2018 | South Africa Under-20 | 5 | (10) |
| 2022– | South Africa | 18 | (5) |
- Correct as of 13 December 2025

Ruan Nortjé (born 25 July 1998) is a South African professional rugby union who as of 2025 plays for the Bulls in the United Rugby Championship and the Blue Bulls in the Currie Cup. His regular position is lock.

== Rugby career ==
Nortjé grew up in Pretoria and represented his local Blue Bulls at the Under-18 Academy Week in 2016. He joined the Blue Bulls academy after school, and played for their Under-19 team in 2017.

In 2018, Nortjé was included in the South Africa Under-20 squad for the 2018 World Rugby Under 20 Championship. He played in all three of their matches during the pool stage – a 33–27 victory over Georgia, a 30–17 win over Ireland and a 29–46 defeat to France. South Africa qualified for the semi-finals as the runner-up with the best record, but fell short in the semifinal against England, losing 31–32, with Nortjé scoring one of South Africa's tries. He scored another try in their third-place play-off against New Zealand, helping his side to a 40–30 win.

Upon his return to South Africa, he was included in the Bulls squad for their final match of the 2018 Super Rugby season against trans-Jukskei rivals the Lions, and he made his Super Rugby debut by coming on as a second half replacement.

== Honours ==
- Super Rugby Unlocked winner 2020
- Currie Cup winner 2020–21, 2021
- Pro14 Rainbow Cup runner-up 2021
- United Rugby Championship runner-up 2021–22
- United Rugby Championship Ironman award for 2021–22 season
- Named in the 2021–22 and 2023–24 United Rugby Championship Elite XV team
- Bulls URC Player of the Year 2022
- 2025 Rugby Championship winner

== Statistics ==
=== Test match record ===
As of 15 November 2026

| Opponent | P | W | D | L | Try | Pts | %Won |
|---|---|---|---|---|---|---|---|
| Argentina | 4 | 3 | 0 | 1 | 0 | 0 | 75 |
| Australia | 2 | 2 | 0 | 0 | 0 | 0 | 100 |
| England | 1 | 1 | 0 | 0 | 0 | 0 | 100 |
| France | 2 | 1 | 0 | 1 | 0 | 0 | 50 |
| Georgia | 1 | 1 | 0 | 0 | 0 | 0 | 100 |
| Ireland | 1 | 1 | 0 | 0 | 0 | 0 | 100 |
| Italy | 4 | 4 | 0 | 0 | 0 | 0 | 100 |
| New Zealand | 8 | 6 | 0 | 2 | 0 | 0 | 75 |
| Scotland | 1 | 1 | 0 | 0 | 0 | 0 | 100 |
| Wales | 2 | 1 | 0 | 1 | 1 | 5 | 50 |
| Total | 26 | 21 | 0 | 4 | 1 | 5 | 80.77 |

=== International tries ===
As of 29 November 2025

| Try | Opposing team | Location | Venue | Competition | Date | Result | Score |
|---|---|---|---|---|---|---|---|
| 1 | Wales | Cardiff, Wales | Millennium Stadium | 2025 end-of-year tests | 29 November 2025 | Win | 0–73 |
