= Schalk Erasmus =

South African rugby union player

- Full name: Schalk Willem Hendrik Erasmus
- Born: 15 April 1998 (age 28) Ellisras, South Africa
- Height: 1.84 m (6 ft 1/2 in)
- Weight: 108 kg (238 lb)
- School: Afrikaanse Hoër Seunskool
- University: Stellenbosch University

Rugby union career
- Position: Hooker
- Current team: Toyota Verblitz
Senior career
Years	Team	Apps	(Points)
2019	Western Province	7	(5)
2020	Stormers	0	(0)
2020–2022	Bulls	6	(5)
2020–2022	Blue Bulls	18	(15)
2022–2025	Kubota Spears	18	(25)
2025-	Toyota Verblitz	9	(5)
- Correct as of 16 September 2022
International career
Years	Team	Apps	(Points)
2016	South Africa Schools 'A'	3	(10)
2018	South Africa Under-20	5	(5)
- Correct as of 25 August 2019

Schalk Willem Hendrik Erasmus (born 16 April 1998) is a South African rugby union player for Western Province in the Currie Cup and the Rugby Challenge. His regular position is hooker.

He made his Currie Cup debut for Western Province in July 2019, coming on as a replacement hooker in their Round Six match of the 2019 season against Griquas.

== Honours ==
- Currie Cup winner 2020–21
- Pro14 Rainbow Cup runner-up 2021
