= George Cronjé =

South African rugby union player

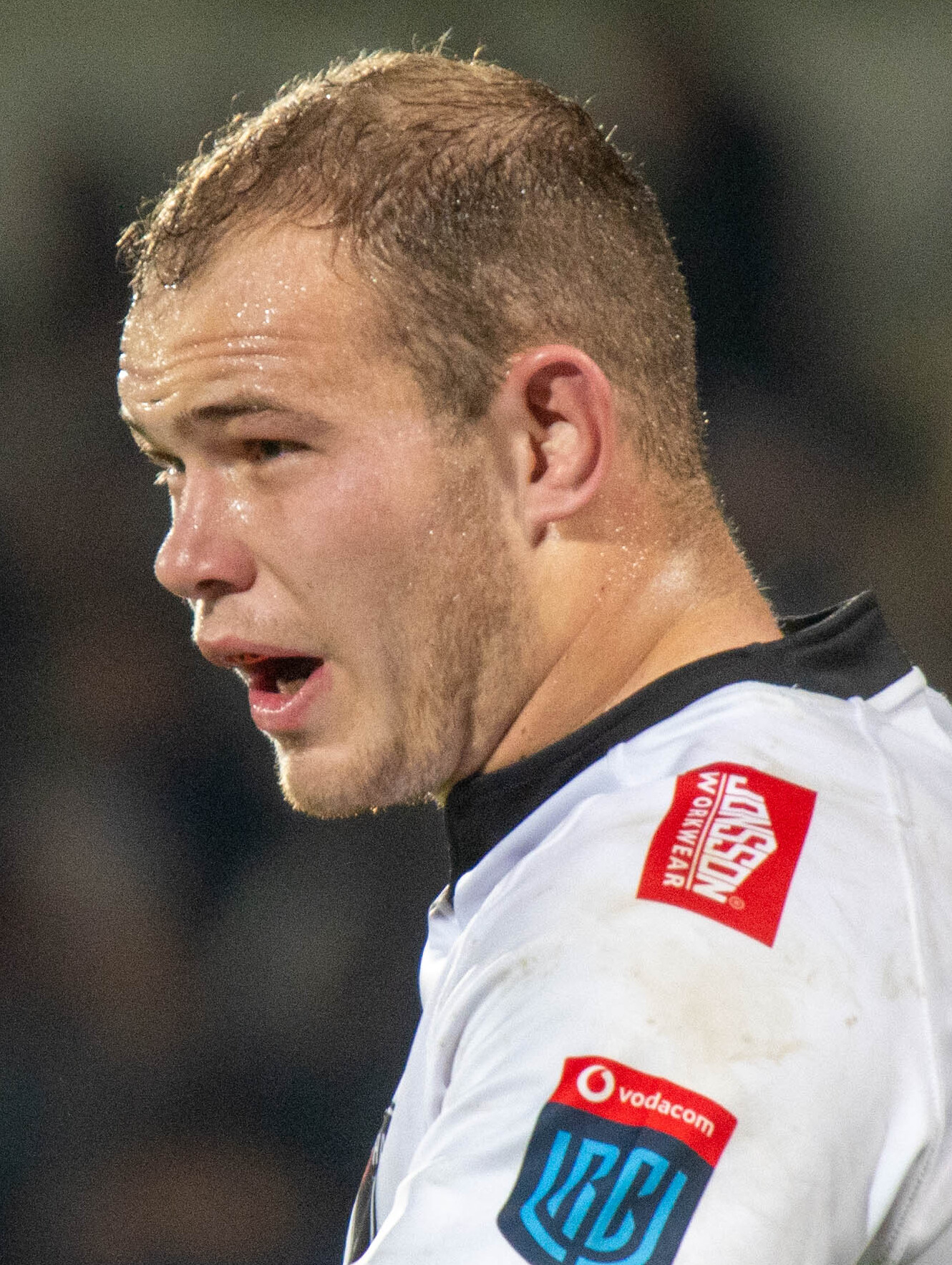
- Full name: George Cronjé
- Born: 28 June 2001 (age 25) Bloemfontein, South Africa
- Height: 1.92 m (6 ft 3 1/2 in)
- Weight: 102 kg (225 lb)
- School: Grey College

Rugby union career
- Position: Flanker
- Current team: Cheetahs / Free State Cheetahs
Youth career
- Clermont
Senior career
Years	Team	Apps	(Points)
2020–	Cheetahs	0	(0)
2020–	Free State Cheetahs	6	(0)
- Correct as of 10 July 2022

George Cronjé (born 28 June 2001) is a South African rugby union player for the Cheetahs in Super Rugby Unlocked and Free State Cheetahs in the Currie Cup. His regular position is flanker.

== Career ==
Cronjé was named in the Cheetahs squad for the Super Rugby Unlocked competition. He made his debut for the Cheetahs in Round 2 of the 2020 Currie Cup Premier Division against the Blue Bulls.
