= Marnus Potgieter =

South African rugby union player

- Full name: Marnus Potgieter
- Born: 20 June 1999 (age 27) South Africa
- Height: 1.87 m (6 ft 2 in)
- Weight: 112 kg (247 lb)
- School: Afrikaanse Hoër Seunskool

Rugby union career
- Position: Centre / Wing
- Current team: Sharks / Sharks (Currie Cup)
Senior career
Years	Team	Apps	(Points)
2018	Blue Bulls XV	2	(0)
2020–2021	Blue Bulls	4	(0)
2021–	Sharks (Currie Cup)	21	(30)
2021–	Sharks	22	(35)
- Correct as of 2 May 2024
International career
Years	Team	Apps	(Points)
2019–2020	South Africa Under-20	7	(15)

Marnus Potgieter (born 20 June 1999) is a South African rugby union player for the Sharks in the United Rugby Championship and in the Currie Cup. His regular position is centre or wing.

Potgieter was named in the Bulls squad for the Super Rugby Unlocked competition. He made his debut for the Blue Bulls in Round 2 of the 2020 Currie Cup Premier Division against the Free State Cheetahs.

== Honours ==
- Currie Cup winner 2020–21
