= Duncan Saal =

South African rugby union player

- Full name: Duncan Rowan Saal
- Born: 24 October 1996 (age 30) Bellville, South Africa
- Height: 1.77 m (5 ft 9 1/2 in)
- Weight: 93 kg (205 lb)

Rugby union career
- Position: Wing
- Current team: Western Province
Senior career
Years	Team	Apps	(Points)
2018	Western Province	9	(45)
2019–2022	Cheetahs	0	(0)
2020–2022	Free State Cheetahs	9	(15)
2023–	Western Province		
- Correct as of 13 March 2023

Duncan Saal (born 24 October 1996) is a South African rugby union player for the Cheetahs in Super Rugby Unlocked and Free State Cheetahs in the Currie Cup. His regular position is wing.

Saal was named in the Cheetahs squad for the Super Rugby Unlocked competition. He made his debut for the Cheetahs in Round 4 of the 2020 Currie Cup Premier Division against the Pumas.
