= Divan Venter =

South African rugby union player

- Full name: Divan Venter
- Born: South Africa
- School: Die Hoërskool Menlopark
- University: University of Pretoria

Rugby union career
- Position: Flanker
- Current team: Blue Bulls
Senior career
Years	Team	Apps	(Points)
2021–	Blue Bulls	1	(0)
- Correct as of 10 January 2021

Divan Venter is a South African rugby union player for the Blue Bulls in the Currie Cup. His regular position is flanker.

Venter was named in the Blue Bulls side for their Round 7 match of the 2020–21 Currie Cup Premier Division against the Pumas. He made his debut in the same fixture, coming on as a replacement flanker.
