= Jacques van Rooyen =

South African rugby union player

- Born: 24 October 1986 (age 40) Pretoria, South Africa
- Height: 1.86 m (6 ft 1 in)
- Weight: 122 kg (19 st 3 lb; 269 lb)
- School: Hoërskool Pretoria-Noord
- University: University of Pretoria; Tshwane University of Technology

Rugby union career
- Position: Prop
- Current team: Bulls / Blue Bulls
Amateur team(s)
Years	Team	Apps	(Points)
2008–2011	TUT Vikings	25	(5)
2011–2012	City of Armagh		
2012–2013	Pretoria Police		
Senior career
Years	Team	Apps	(Points)
2013–2018	Golden Lions XV	17	(15)
2013–2017	Golden Lions	48	(20)
2014–2018	Lions	66	(25)
2018–2019	Bath	24	(5)
2019–2020	NTT Red Hurricanes	6	(0)
2020–	Bulls	21	(0)
2020–	Blue Bulls	17	(5)
- Correct as of 23 July 2022
International career
Years	Team	Apps	(Points)
2017	Barbarians	2	(0)
- Correct as of 16 April 2018

Jacques van Rooyen (born 24 October 1986) is a South African rugby union player for the Bulls in the United Rugby Championship and the Blue Bulls in the Currie Cup. His regular position is prop.

== Career ==
=== Varsity Cup and amateur rugby ===
He represented the TUT Vikings in Varsity Cup rugby in the 2008, 2009, 2010 and 2011 seasons, making twenty five appearances in total. Van Rooyen was also in the South African police service for 2 years before getting a pro contract after varsity stating that he always wanted to follow in his father's footsteps as a police officer despite going to varsity

He also played for Irish side City of Armagh in the 2011–2012 Ulster Senior League.

=== Golden Lions ===
In 2013, after impressing at amateur club level with Pretoria Police, he joined Johannesburg-based team the Golden Lions. He made his first class debut in the opening match of the 2013 Vodacom Cup competition, coming on as a substitute against the Leopards. Two weeks later, he made his first start in the same competition against near rivals the Blue Bulls. He made six appearances in total for the Golden Lions, including playing in the quarter-final and starting the semi-final, as well as the final, which the Lions won by beating the Pumas.

He was also included in their squad for the 2013 Currie Cup Premier Division season and made his Currie Cup debut in the opening match of the season against the Free State Cheetahs.

He was then included in the Lions squad for the 2014 Super Rugby season and made his debut in a 21–20 victory over the Cheetahs in Bloemfontein.

=== Bath ===
Van Rooyen moved to England to join Premiership side Bath prior to the 2018–19 season.

== Honours ==
- Super Rugby runner up (3) 2016, 2017, 2018
- Currie Cup winner (2) 2020–21, 2021
- Pro14 Rainbow Cup runner-up 2021
