= MJ Pelser =

South African rugby union player

- Full name: MJ Pelser
- Born: 28 July 1998 (age 28) South Africa
- Height: 1.85 m (6 ft 1 in)
- Weight: 101 kg (223 lb)
- School: Monument High School (Krugersdorp)

Rugby union career
- Position: Flanker
- Current team: Zebre Parma
Youth career
- Lions
Senior career
| Years | Team | Apps | (Points) |
| 2018−2019 | Golden Lions XV | 1 | (0) |
| 2020–2022 | Lions | 9 | (15) |
| 2020–2022 | Golden Lions | 9 | (0) |
| 2022–2023 | Zebre Parma | 9 | (10) |
- Correct as of 18 Dec 2022

MJ Pelser (born 28 July 1998) is a South African rugby union player for the Zebre in United Rugby Championship. His regular position is flanker.

In 2020 Pelser was named in the Lions squad for the Super Rugby Unlocked competition. Pelser made his Lions debut in Round 1 of the Super Rugby Unlocked competition against the Sharks. In 2021 He also played for the Lions in Pro14 Rainbow Cup and Golden Lions in Currie Cup from 2020 to 2022

He was also first to sign for the Italian team Zebre in United Rugby Championship for 2022−23 season.
