= Jan Uys =

South African rugby union player

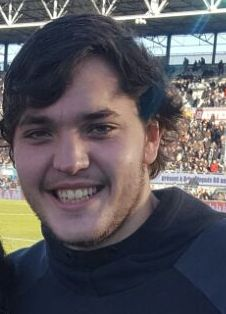
- Full name: Jan-Frederik Uys
- Born: 3 January 1994 (age 32) Potchefstroom, South Africa
- Height: 1.99 m (6 ft 6 1/2 in)
- Weight: 120 kg (260 lb; 18 st 13 lb)
- School: Paul Roos Gymnasium, Stellenbosch
- University: University of South Africa

Rugby union career
- Position: Lock
- Current team: Zebre Parma
Youth career
- 2010–2014: Western Province
- 2015: Eastern Province Kings
- 2016: Pau
Amateur team(s)
Years	Team	Apps	(Points)
2014	UCT Ikey Tigers	5	(0)
Senior career
Years	Team	Apps	(Points)
2014	Western Province	8	(0)
2016–2020	Brive	64	(5)
2020–2021	Bulls	1	(0)
2020–2021	Blue Bulls	4	(0)
2021–2022	Grenoble	6	(0)
2022–2023	Zebre Parma	13	(0)
- Correct as of 22 Apr 2023
International career
Years	Team	Apps	(Points)
2010	S.A. Under-16 High Performance squad		
- Correct as of 6 Nov 2014

Jan-Frederik Uys (born 3 January 1994 in Potchefstroom, South Africa) is a South African rugby union player, currently playing with an Italian team, Zebre Parma. His regular position is lock.

== Career ==
=== Youth and Varsity Cup rugby ===
He attended and played high school rugby for Paul Roos Gymnasium in Stellenbosch. This led to his selection in the Western Province side that played at the Under-16 Grant Khomo Week in Upington in 2010. This, in turn, earned him an inclusion in a South African Under-16 High Performance squad that attended a training camp in Cape Town. In 2011, Uys represented the Western Province Under-18 side that played at the Academy Week tournament.

He joined the Western Province Rugby Institute after high school and captained the Western Province U19 team that played in the 2013 Under-19 Provincial Championship.

In 2014, he played in the first five matches of the UCT Ikey Tigers' 2014 Varsity Cup, a competition that UCT went on to win, beating the NWU Pukke in the final. After a stint playing Vodacom Cup rugby (see below, Uys played a big part in the Western Province U21 side's 2014 Under-21 Provincial Championship campaign. He made eight appearances during the season to help them finish top of the log and subsequently reach the final of the tournament. He played in the final, but could not prevent his side losing the final 20–10 to the Blue Bulls U21s on home soil.

=== Western Province ===
Uys made his first class debut during the 2014 Vodacom Cup competition. He started Western Province's opening match of the season, a 16–8 victory over near-neighbours Boland Cavaliers. He made five consecutive starts for Western Province at the start of the competition and played off the bench in the final two matches of the group stages of the competition. He also came on as a substitute in their quarter-final match against the Pumas, which ended in a 13–8 victory for the Nelspruit-based side to see Western Province eliminated from the competition.

He also played in their matches against Kenya and Namibia in June 2014.

=== Eastern Province Kings ===
He then moved from the Western Cape to the Eastern Cape, joining Port Elizabeth-based side the Eastern Province Kings for the 2015 season. He made eleven appearances for the Under-21 team during the 2015 Under-21 Provincial Championship Group A and also captained the side on occasion,.

=== Pau ===
At the beginning of 2016, he left Port Elizabeth and moved to France, where he joined Top 14 side Pau for the 2015–16 season.

=== Brive ===
He spent 6 months in Pau before moving to fellow Top 14 side Brive for the 2016–17 season. He is currently still with Brive for the 2017-2018 season

=== Zebre ===
For 2022−23, he signed for Italian team Zebre Parma in United Rugby Championship.

== Honours ==
- Currie Cup winner 2020–21
- Pro14 Rainbow Cup runner-up 2021
