= Dan Jooste =

South African rugby union player

- Full name: Daniel Jooste
- Born: 21 February 1998 (age 28)
- Height: 1.87 m (6 ft 1 1/2 in)
- Weight: 105 kg (231 lb)
- School: Paarl Boys' High School

Rugby union career
- Position: Hooker
- Current team: Sharks / Sharks (Currie Cup)
Senior career
Years	Team	Apps	(Points)
2019-2020	Maties	10	(30)
2019	Western Province	4	(5)
2019–2020	Stormers	1	(0)
2020–	Sharks	19	(15)
2020–	Sharks (Currie Cup)	22	(20)
- Correct as of 9 February 2023
International career
Years	Team	Apps	(Points)
2016	South Africa Schools	3	(0)
2017–2018	South Africa Under-20	6	(0)
- Correct as of 13 June 2019

Daniel Jooste (born 21 February 1998) is a South African rugby union player for the Sharks in Super Rugby Unlocked. His regular position is hooker.

Jooste made his Super Rugby debut for the Stormers in their match against the Lions in May 2019, coming on as a replacement hooker.
