= Reinhardt Fortuin =

South African rugby union player

- Full name: Reinhardt Fortuin
- Born: 30 January 1996 (age 30) Pretoria, South Africa
- Height: 1.80 m (5 ft 11 in)
- Weight: 94 kg (207 lb)
- School: Paul Roos Gymnasium
- University: Stellenbosch University

Rugby union career
- Position: Fly-half
- Current team: Cheetahs / Free State Cheetahs
Senior career
Years	Team	Apps	(Points)
2020–	Cheetahs	10	(12)
2020–	Free State Cheetahs	35	(40)
- Correct as of 25 March 2024
International career
Years	Team	Apps	(Points)
2023-	Netherlands	7	(25)
- Correct as of 25 March 2024

Reinhardt Fortuin (born 30 January 1996) is a professional rugby union player who plays as a fly-half for the Cheetahs in the Currie Cup and Challenge Cup. Born in South Africa, he represents the Netherlands internationally.

== Career ==
=== Club career ===
Fortuin was named in the Cheetahs squad for the Super Rugby Unlocked competition. He made his debut for the Cheetahs in Round 6 of Super Rugby Unlocked against the Stormers.

=== International career ===
In January 2023 he was selected by the Netherlands for the 2023 Rugby Europe Championship. He debuted at fly half in a 28-20 loss against Spain. He started at fly half in the following two weeks against Georgia and Germany. He scored his first try against Germany in the 2024 Rugby Europe Championship.
