= Mornay Smith =

South African rugby union player

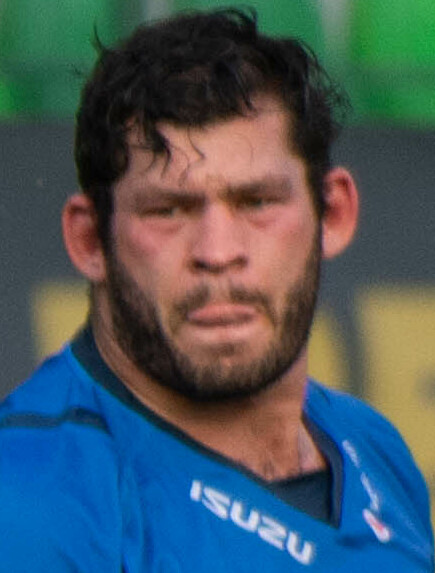
- Full name: Mornay Jan Jakobus Smith
- Born: 30 January 1998 (age 28) Pretoria, South Africa
- Height: 1.81 m (5 ft 11 1/2 in)
- Weight: 119 kg (262 lb; 18 st 10 lb)
- School: Hoërskool Eldoraigne

Rugby union career
- Position: Prop
- Current team: Bulls / Blue Bulls
Youth career
- 2014–2019: Blue Bulls
Senior career
Years	Team	Apps	(Points)
2018–2019	Blue Bulls XV	10	(0)
2018–	Bulls	25	(0)
2020–	Blue Bulls	14	(5)
- Correct as of 23 July 2022
International career
Years	Team	Apps	(Points)
2016	South Africa Schools 'A'	3	(0)
- Correct as of 2 July 2018

Mornay Jan Jakobus Smith (born 30 January 1998) is a South African rugby union player for the Bulls in the United Rugby Championship and the Blue Bulls in the Currie Cup. His regular position is tighthead prop.

== Rugby career ==
=== Youth rugby ===
Smith was born in Pretoria. He went to Hoërskool Eldoraigne, where he played rugby for the first team. He was included in the Blue Bulls' Craven Week team in 2016, and also earned a selection to the South Africa Schools 'A' squad, playing in matches against Italy, England and Wales in the 2016 Under-19 International Series.

=== Senior career ===
Smith was included in the Blue Bulls XV squad for the 2018 Rugby Challenge and made his first class debut in their 27–20 victory over trans-Jukskei rivals the Golden Lions XV. After just four appearances – which included his first start against the Welwitschias – Smith was named in the matchday squad of the Bulls Super Rugby team for their match in Round 17 of the 2018 Super Rugby season against the Sunwolves in Singapore and he duly made his Super Rugby debut, coming on as a 67th minute replacement in a 37–42 defeat.

== Honours ==
- Currie Cup winner 2020–21, 2021
- Pro14 Rainbow Cup runner-up 2021
- United Rugby Championship runner-up 2021-22
