= Stephan de Jager =

South African rugby union player

- Full name: Stephan de Jager
- Born: South Africa

Rugby union career
- Position: Prop
- Current team: Griffons
Senior career
Years	Team	Apps	(Points)
2018	Pumas	1	(0)
2019	Leopards	3	(0)
2020	Pumas	1	(0)
2021–	Griffons	7	(0)
- Correct as of 27 March 2022

Stephan de Jager is a South African rugby union plays for the Griffons in the Currie Cup. His regular position is prop.

de Jager had previously represented the Pumas in the SuperSport Rugby Challenge before representing Leopards in the 2019 Currie Cup First Division. He joined the Pumas ahead of the newly formed Super Rugby Unlocked competition in October 2020. Dimaza made his debut in Round 4 of Super Rugby Unlocked against the Sharks.
