= Theo Boshoff =

South African rugby union player

- Full name: Theo Fiela Boshoff
- Born: 31 August 1998 (age 28) South Africa
- Height: 1.85 m (6 ft 1 in)
- Weight: 83 kg (183 lb)

Rugby union career
- Position: Fly-half
- Current team: Griquas
Senior career
Years	Team	Apps	(Points)
2017–2018	Blue Bulls XV	9	(21)
2020–2021	Pumas	3	(4)
2021–	Griquas	11	(14)
- Correct as of 10 July 2022

Theo Boshoff (born 31 August 1998) is a South African rugby union player for the Griquas in the Currie Cup. His regular position is fly-half.

Boshoff had previously represented the Blue Bulls XV in the SuperSport Rugby Challenge. He joined the Pumas ahead of the newly formed Super Rugby Unlocked competition in October 2020. Dimaza made his debut in Round 4 of Super Rugby Unlocked against the Sharks.
