= Zak Burger =

South African rugby union player

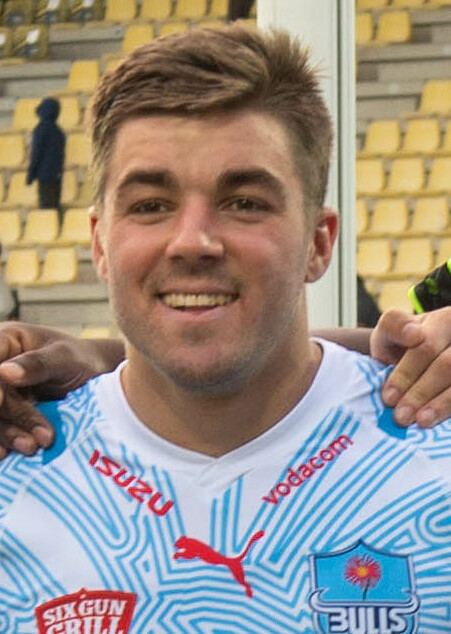
- Full name: Izak Burger
- Born: 20 August 1998 (age 28)
- Height: 1.74 m (5 ft 8 1/2 in)
- Weight: 83 kg (183 lb; 13 st 1 lb)
- School: Paarl Gimnasium
- Notable relative: Jandre Burger (brother)

Rugby union career
- Position: Scrum-half
- Current team: Bulls / Blue Bulls
Youth career
- 2011–2016: Western Province
- 2017–2018: Sharks
Senior career
Years	Team	Apps	(Points)
2018–2020	Griquas	30	(25)
2021–	Bulls	23	(15)
2021–	Blue Bulls	10	(25)
- Correct as of 23 July 2022
International career
Years	Team	Apps	(Points)
2018	South Africa Under-20	4	(10)
- Correct as of 25 August 2018

Izak Burger (born 20 August 1998) is a South African rugby union player for the Bulls in the United Rugby Championship and the Blue Bulls in the Currie Cup. His regular position is scrum-half.

== Honours ==
- SuperSport Rugby Challenge winner 2019
- Currie Cup winner 2021
- Pro14 Rainbow Cup runner-up 2021
- United Rugby Championship runner-up 2021-22
