= Heath Backhouse =

South African rugby union player

- Full name: Heath Backhouse
- Born: 4 September 1998 (age 28) South Africa
- Height: 1.98 m (6 ft 6 in)
- Weight: 107 kg (236 lb)
- School: Montana Pretoria

Rugby union career
- Position: Lock
- Current team: Pumas
Senior career
Years	Team	Apps	(Points)
2019–2020	Biarritz	22	(5)
2020–	Pumas	3	(0)
- Correct as of 3 March 2021

Heath Backhouse (born 4 September 1998) is a South African rugby union player for the Pumas in the Currie Cup. His regular position is lock.

He previously represented Biarritz in Rugby Pro D2, making 22 appearances over the course of the 2018–19 and 2019–20 seasons, scoring one try. He joined the Pumas ahead of the newly formed Super Rugby Unlocked competition.
