= Chris Smith (rugby union) =

South African rugby union player

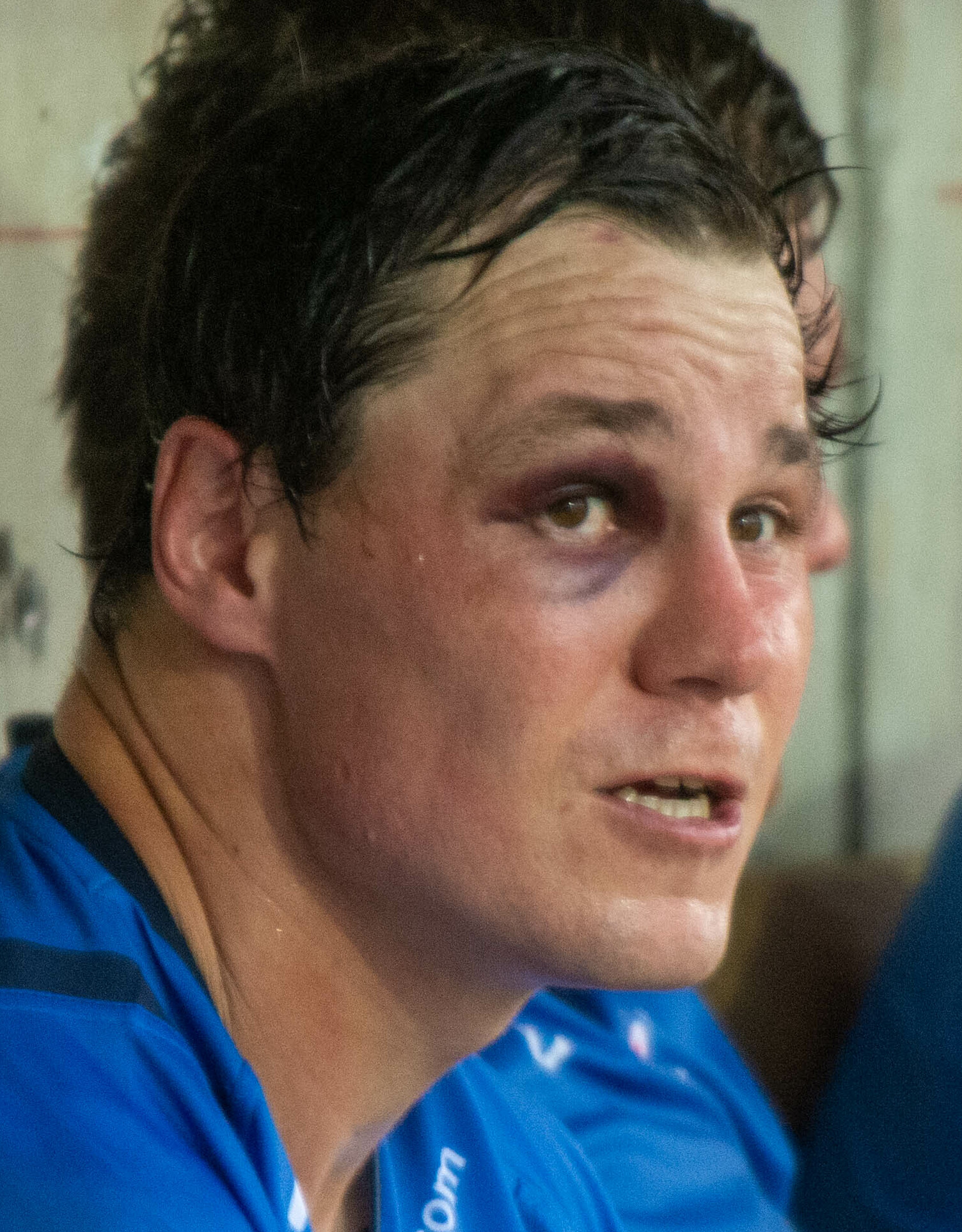
- Full name: Christopher William Smith
- Born: 9 September 1994 (age 32) Cape Town, South Africa
- Height: 1.81 m (5 ft 11 1/2 in)
- Weight: 91 kg (201 lb; 14 st 5 lb)
- School: South African College Schools
- University: University of Stellenbosch

Rugby union career
- Position: Fly-half
- Current team: Lions
Youth career
- 2013–2015: Western Province
Senior career
| Years | Team | Apps | (Points) |
| 2018–2019 | Pumas | 29 | (310) |
| 2019–2024 | Bulls | 69 | (452) |
| 2020– | Blue Bulls | 24 | (160) |
| 2024–2025 | Oyonnax | 24 | (135) |
| 2025– | Golden Lions | 4 | (49) |
| 2025– | Lions | 27 | (216) |
- Correct as of 3 November 2026

Christopher William Smith (born 9 September 1994) is a South African rugby union player for the Lions in the United Rugby Championship and in the Currie Cup. His regular position is fly-half.

He was a member of the Pumas squad that won the 2018 Rugby Challenge, featuring in ten of their eleven matches and finishing as the competition's top scorer with 131 points.

== Career ==
After playing in the South African College Schools first team in both the 2011 and 2012 seasons. Smith found himself at loose end but Smith was invited by John Dobson to join the Western Province Rugby institute. Smith went on to play in the Western Province u21 team in both 2014 and 2015, where the team won the Currie Cup with the likes of Jacques Vermeulen, Huw Jones, Dan du Plessis, EW Viljoen, and school compatriots Luke van der Smit and Gino Lupini. After u21 seasons Smith played in the Varsity Cup where he found himself playing for the University of Stellenbosch, playing with future springboks such as Robert du Preez. He was then sign in 2018 to the Pumas and 2019 to the Bulls.

== Honours ==
- SuperSport Rugby Challenge winner 2018
- SuperSport Rugby Challenge Player of the Year 2018
- Super Rugby Unlocked winner 2020
- Currie Cup winner 2020–21, 2021
- Pro14 Rainbow Cup runner-up 2021
- United Rugby Championship runner-up 2021–22
- URC Gilbert Golden Boot award for 2023–24 season.
