= Welkom-Gimnasium =

Location
- Gimnasiumstraat 1 Welkom, Free State, 9549; South Africa
- Coordinates: 27.975°S 26.731°E

Information
- Type: State school
- Motto: Persevera et labora
- Established: 1953
- Principal: Mr Slabbert
- Grades: 8-12
- Gender: Boys & Girls
- Age: 14 to 18
- Language: Afrikaans; English
- Campus type: Urban Campus
- Colors: Black; Gold; White
- Website: welkom-gimnasium.co.za

Welkom-Gimnasium is an academic secondary school in Welkom, South Africa. Founded in 1953 as an Afrikaans school, the school has been a dual-medium school offering classes in English since 1996. Welkom-Gimnasium is well known for its rivalry with Goudveld Hoërskool.
