= Le Roux Roets =

South African rugby union player

- Born: 14 January 1995 (age 31) Boksburg, South Africa
- Height: 2.01 m (6 ft 7 in)
- Weight: 138 kg (304 lb; 21 st 10 lb)
- School: Hoërskool Garsfontein, Pretoria
- University: University of Johannesburg

Rugby union career
- Position: Lock
- Current team: Sale Sharks
Youth career
- 2014–2015: Golden Lions
- 2015–2016: Blue Bulls
- 2016–2017: Racing 92
Senior career
Years	Team	Apps	(Points)
2015	Golden Lions XV	1	(0)
2016	Blue Bulls XV	1	(0)
2018–2021	Pumas	20	(35)
2019	Waratahs	0	(0)
2020–2024	Sharks	21	(10)
2021–2024	Sharks (Currie Cup)	13	(10)
2024-	Sale Sharks		
- Correct as of 4 October 2024

Le Roux Roets (born 14 January 1995) is a South African rugby union player for Sale Sharks. His regular position is lock.
