= Ruan Kramer =

South African rugby union player

- Full name: Ruan Cornelius Adriaan Kramer
- Born: 3 August 1995 (age 31) Bloemfontein, South Africa
- Height: 1.85 m (6 ft 1 in)
- Weight: 123 kg (271 lb; 19 st 5 lb)
- School: Grey College
- University: University of KwaZulu-Natal

Rugby union career
- Position: Prop
- Current team: Pumas
Youth career
- 2008–2013: Free State Cheetahs
- 2014–2016: Sharks
Senior career
Years	Team	Apps	(Points)
2016–2017	Sharks XV	13	(0)
2017	Griffons	12	(5)
2018–2019	Griquas	22	(0)
2020–	Pumas	14	(0)
- Correct as of 10 July 2022

Ruan Cornelius Adriaan Kramer (born 3 August 1995) is a South African rugby union player for Griquas in the Currie Cup and the Rugby Challenge. His regular position is prop.
