= Neil Maritz =

South African rugby union player (born 1994)

- Full name: Neil Kobus Maritz
- Born: 22 February 1994 (age 32) Worcester, South Africa
- Height: 1.82 m (5 ft 11 1/2 in)
- Weight: 95 kg (14 st 13 lb; 209 lb)
- School: Paarl Boys' High School

Rugby union career
- Position: Winger / Centre
Youth career
- 2013–2015: Sharks
Senior career
Years	Team	Apps	(Points)
2014–2016	Sharks XV	17	(25)
2016	Sharks (Currie Cup)	4	(0)
2017	Eastern Province Kings	7	(25)
2017–2021	Pumas	19	(45)
- Correct as of 12 January 2022

Neil Kobus Maritz (born 22 February 1994) is a South African rugby union player for the Pumas in the Currie Cup and in the Rugby Challenge. He can play as a winger or a centre.

== Rugby career ==
=== Youth rugby / Sharks XV ===
Maritz was born in Worcester and attended Paarl Boys' High School, where he played first team rugby in 2012. He was selected in a Western Province Under-18 Elite Squad in 2011 and 2012, but wasn't selected to represent them at any major youth tournaments, such as the Craven Week.

After high school, Maritz moved to Durban to join the Sharks academy. He was included in the Sharks U19 squad for the 2013 Under-19 Provincial Championship and made five starts for them in the competition, scoring tries in matches against Golden Lions U19, Free State U19 and Western Province U19.

In 2014, he was included in the Sharks XV squad that participated in the 2014 Vodacom Cup. He made his first class debut by starting their opening match of the season against the Border Bulldogs in East London. In addition to making his debut in the match, but he also scored his first senior try ten minutes into the second half, as his side won the match 46–24. He made a total of six appearances in the competition, scoring further tries against the SWD Eagles and Kenyan side Simba XV to help his team finish top of the Southern Section log to qualify for the quarter finals. He didn't feature in their quarter final match against a Golden Lions XV, where the team suffered a 20–27 loss to be eliminated from the competition. In the second half of the season, Maritz was in action for the Sharks' Under-21 team; he made five appearances for the team in the Under-21 Provincial Championship, scoring tries against Border U21 and Free State U21, but it wasn't enough to secure a semi-final berth as the team finished in fifth position.

Maritz made three starts for the Sharks XV in the 2015 Vodacom Cup competition. He failed to contribute any points in a disappointing season for his side, which could win just two matches in the competition to finish outside the play-off spots. The Sharks U21 team had an improved performance in Group A of the 2015 Under-21 Provincial Championship, finishing in third position. Maritz started eight of their matches during the regular season, scoring a try in their match against the Golden Lions and a try and penalty against the Blue Bulls U21s, and also started their semi-final match against Free State U21, which the team from Bloemfontein won 27–22 to end the Sharks' involvement in the competition.

Maritz represented the Sharks XV for the third consecutive season in 2016 – in the qualification series that replaced the Vodacom Cup – and appeared in eight of their fourteen matches in the competition. He scored tries in victories over the Leopards and Griffons for a Sharks XV team that finished in 10th place on the log.

=== Sharks ===
Maritz was included in the Sharks squad for the 2016 Currie Cup Premier Division and named in the starting line-up for their opening match of the competition against Western Province.
