= Eduan Keyter =

South African rugby union player

- Born: 13 June 1996 (age 30)
- Height: 1.85 m (6 ft 1 in)
- Weight: 93 kg (205 lb)
- School: Affies
- University: University of Stellenbosch

Rugby union career
- Position: Centre / Wing
- Current team: Sharks / Sharks (Currie Cup)
Amateur team(s)
Years	Team	Apps	(Points)
2017–2018	Maties		
Senior career
Years	Team	Apps	(Points)
2019–2021	Griquas	31	(90)
2021–2025	Sharks	13	(10)
2022–	Sharks (Currie Cup)	1	(0)
2025–	Golden Lions	1	(0)
2025–	Lions	7	(15)
- Correct as of 31 January 2026
International career
Years	Team	Apps	(Points)
2014	South Africa Schools	2	(0)
- Correct as of 12 July 2019

Eduan Keyter (born 13 June 1996) is a South African rugby union player for Griquas in the Currie Cup and the Rugby Challenge. His regular position is centre and wing.

Keyter made his Currie Cup debut for Griquas in July 2019, coming on as a replacement in their opening match of the 2019 season against the Sharks.
