= Jeandré Rudolph =

South African rugby union player

- Born: 9 May 1994 (age 32) Florida, South Africa
- Height: 1.88 m (6 ft 2 in)
- Weight: 108 kg (238 lb; 17 st 0 lb)
- School: Hoër Landbouskool Oakdale, Riversdale

Rugby union career
- Position: Loose forward
- Current team: Bulls
Youth career
- 2010–2012: SWD Eagles
- 2013–2015: Leopards
Senior career
Years	Team	Apps	(Points)
2015–2017	Leopards	33	(80)
2018–2020	Pumas	29	(50)
2020	Bulls	4	(5)
2020–2025	Cheetahs	3	(5)
2020–2025	Free State Cheetahs	21	(30)
2025	Bulls	2	(10)
- Correct as of 10 July 2022

Jeandré Rudolph (born 9 May 1994) is a South African rugby union player for the Bulls in the Currie Cup. His regular position is eighth man or flanker.
