= Rikus Pretorius =

South African rugby union player

- Born: 15 January 1999 (age 27)
- Height: 1.92 m (6 ft 3 1/2 in)
- Weight: 102 kg (225 lb)
- School: Grey College

Rugby union career
- Position: Centre
- Current team: Kubota Spears
Senior career
Years	Team	Apps	(Points)
2019–2022	Western Province	17	(0)
2020–2022	Stormers	25	(30)
2022–	Kubota Spears	64	(105)
- Correct as of 30 May 2025
International career
Years	Team	Apps	(Points)
2016–2017	South Africa Schoolboys	5	(5)
2018–2019	South Africa U20	7	(10)
- Correct as of 25 August 2019

Rikus Pretorius (born 15 January 1999) is a South African professional rugby union player for the Kubota Spears. His regular position is centre.

Pretorius made his Currie Cup debut for Western Province in August 2019, starting their Round Seven match of the 2019 season against the Free State Cheetahs.
