= Joe van Zyl =

South African rugby union player

- Full name: Joe van Zyl
- Born: 21 January 1999 (age 27) South Africa
- Height: 1.84 m (6 ft 1/2 in)
- Weight: 105 kg (231 lb)
- School: Afrikaanse Hoër Seunskool

Rugby union career
- Position: Hooker
- Current team: Bulls
Senior career
Years	Team	Apps	(Points)
2019	Blue Bulls XV	5	(0)
2020–	Bulls	8	(10)
2020–	Blue Bulls	5	(10)
- Correct as of 23 July 2022

Joe van Zyl (born 21 January 1999) is a South African rugby union player for the Bulls in Super Rugby. His regular position is hooker.

van Zyl was named in the Bulls side for Round 2 of the Super Rugby Unlocked competition. He made his debut in this game off the bench, scoring a try in the 79th minute in a 19–17 defeat to the Cheetahs.

== Honours ==
- Super Rugby Unlocked champion 2020
- Currie Cup champion 2021
