= Kerron van Vuuren =

South African rugby union player

- Full name: Kerron Thomas van Vuuren
- Born: 23 May 1995 (age 31) Durban, South Africa
- Height: 1.88 m (6 ft 2 in)
- Weight: 101 kg (223 lb; 15 st 13 lb)
- School: Glenwood High School, Durban
- University: University of KwaZulu-Natal

Rugby union career
- Position: Hooker
- Current team: Sharks / Sharks (Currie Cup)
Youth career
- 2013: Sharks
- 2014: Golden Lions
- 2015–2016: Sharks
Senior career
| Years | Team | Apps | (Points) |
| 2016–2018 | Sharks XV | 24 | (10) |
| 2017–2024 | Sharks (Currie Cup) | 24 | (45) |
| 2018 | → Southern Kings | 1 | (0) |
| 2019–2024 | Sharks | 64 | (60) |
| 2025–present | Seattle Seawolves | 0 | (0) |
- Correct as of 28 January 2025

Kerron Thomas van Vuuren (born 23 May 1995) is a South African rugby union player for the Seattle Seawolves in Major League Rugby. He usually plays as a hooker.

== Career ==
Vuuren began playing rugby at Glenwood High School in Durban, where he represented the school's rugby team. His skills and potential were recognized, leading him to join the Sharks Academy.

During this time, he also attended the University of KwaZulu-Natal and played for the university team in the Varsity Cup competition.
