= AJ Jacobs (rugby union) =

South African rugby referee

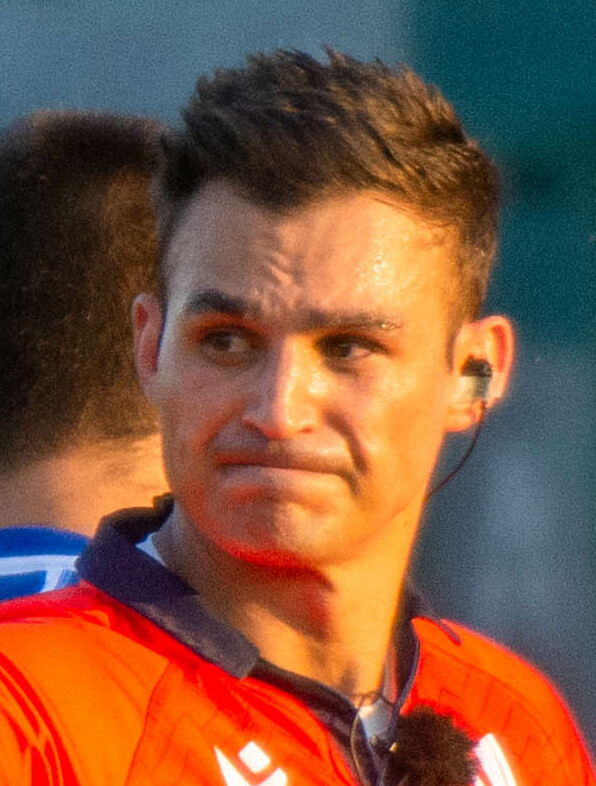
- Full name: Adriaan Mauritz Jacobs
- Born: 19 March 1985 (age 41) Kimberley, South Africa
- Height: 1.79 m (5 ft 10 1/2 in)
- Weight: 82 kg (181 lb; 12 st 13 lb)
- School: Welkom-Gimnasium

Rugby union career
Refereeing career
| Years | Competition | Apps |
| 2015–present | Vodacom Cup | |
| 2015–present | Currie Cup | |

Adriaan Mauritz Jacobs (born 19 March 1985) is a professional rugby referee on the Premier Panel of the South African Rugby Union.

== Career ==
As a player, Jacobs represented the Pumas at the 1998 Under-13 Craven Week and the Griffons at the 2001 Under-16 Grant Khomo Week. He played for the Griffons Under-20 and Under-21 side in the respective provincial championships between 2004 and 2006.

He qualified as a teacher and, while still playing club rugby, also started refereeing high school matches. He was persuaded to prioritise refereeing over playing and joined the Griffons Referees' Society in 2010. He quickly progressed to the South African Rugby Referees' Association's National Panel.

He refereed in some matches during the 2014 SARU Community Cup, 2014 Under-19 Provincial Championship and 2015 Varsity Shield competitions and made his first class debut by taking charge of the Limpopo Blue Bulls versus Golden Lions match in Polokwane. He also took charge of the match between the Border Bulldogs and the Falcons in the 2015 Currie Cup qualification series and was appointed to referee the unofficial final of the Under-18 Craven Week, the premier rugby union tournament for schools in South Africa, held in Paarl in 2015. He also officiated in the 2015 Under-18 International Series and in the 2015 Under-21 Provincial Championship.

He took charge of his first match in the Premier Division of the Currie Cup of 19 September 2015, when he officiated the Free State Cheetahs versus Griquas match in Bloemfontein.
