= Dylan Richardson =

Scotland international rugby union player

- Born: 15 January 1999 (age 27) Pinetown, KwaZulu-Natal, South Africa
- Height: 1.84 m (6 ft 1/2 in)
- Weight: 110 kg (240 lb)
- School: Kearsney College

Rugby union career
- Position: Loose forward / Hooker
- Current team: Edinburgh
Youth career
- 2017–2019: Sharks
Senior career
Years	Team	Apps	(Points)
2019–2025	Sharks	34	(25)
2019–2025	Sharks (Currie Cup)	35	(25)
2025–	Edinburgh	0	(0)
- Correct as of 14 July 2025
International career
Years	Team	Apps	(Points)
2017	South Africa Schools	2	(0)
2019	South Africa Under-20	5	(10)
2021–	Scotland	6	(15)
- Correct as of 14 July 2025

Dylan Thor Richardson (born 15 January 1999) is a Scotland international rugby union player. He plays for Edinburgh in the United Rugby Championship. He is a utility forward that can play as a loose forward or a hooker.

== Club career ==
In May 2019, Richardson made his Super Rugby debut for the Sharks against the Lions, coming on as a replacement hooker.

In April 2025, he signed for Edinburgh in the United Rugby Championship on an initial two-year deal ahead of the following season.

== International career ==
Richardson represented South Africa Schools in 2017, making two appearances in the 2017 Under-19 International Series. He was also included in the South Africa Under-20 squad for the 2019 World Rugby Under 20 Championship.

Richardson was named as part of the Scotland training squad for the 2021 Autumn nations series, for which he was eligible because his father was born in Scotland. He was subsequently selected for the 42 player full squad for the series. He was named as a replacement for Scotland in their match versus Japan on 20 November 2021. He came on as a second-half substitute to win his first cap in that match which Scotland won.
