= Tiaan Swanepoel =

Namibian rugby union player

- Full name: Tiaan Henk Swanepoel
- Born: 4 June 1996 (age 30) Windhoek, Namibia
- Height: 1.78 m (5 ft 10 in)
- Weight: 91 kg (201 lb)
- School: Stellenberg High School

Rugby union career
- Position: Fly-half / Fullback
- Current team: Lions / Golden Lions
Senior career
Years	Team	Apps	(Points)
2018	Western Province	1	(2)
2019	West Harbour	16	(174)
2020–2023	Lions	16	(17)
2020–2023	Golden Lions	18	(146)
2023–2024	NEC Green Rockets	12	(90)
2024–	Sharks		
- Correct as of 13 June 2023

Tiaan Henk Swanepoel (born 4 June 1996) is a Namibian rugby union player for the Lions in Super Rugby . His regular position is fly-half or fullback.

He made his Super Rugby debut for the Lions in their round 1 match against the Jaguares in February 2020, starting the match at fullback. He signed for the Lions Super Rugby side for the 2020 Super Rugby season.
