= Gideon van der Merwe =

South African rugby union player

- Full name: Gideon Johann van der Merwe
- Born: 27 January 1995 (age 31) Potchefstroom, South Africa
- Height: 1.83 m (6 ft 0 in)
- Weight: 100 kg (220 lb)
- School: Potchefstroom Gimnasium
- University: North-West University

Rugby union career
- Position: Flank
- Current team: Cheetahs / Free State Cheetahs
Senior career
| Years | Team | Apps | (Points) |
| 2017–2018 | Leopards | 21 | (40) |
| 2019–2021 | Griquas | 34 | (60) |
| 2021– | Cheetahs | | |
| 2022– | Free State Cheetahs | 10 | (20) |
- Correct as of 10 July 2022

Gideon Johann van der Merwe (born 27 January 1995) is a South African rugby union player for Cheetahs in the Currie Cup and the EPCR. His regular position is flank.

Van der Merwe made his Currie Cup debut for Griquas in July 2019, starting their opening match of the 2019 season against the Sharks at flank.
