= Sean Everitt =

South Africa professional rugby union football coach

- Born: South Africa
- School: Dundee High School
- University: University of KwaZulu-Natal

Rugby union career
- Position: Head coach
- Current team: Edinburgh Rugby
Coaching career
- Years: Team
- 2008–2017: Sharks (Youth Coach)
- 2017–2020: Sharks (assistant coach)
- 2019–2021: Sharks (Currie Cup)
- 2020–2022: Sharks
- 2023-: Edinburgh Rugby

Sean Everitt is a South African professional rugby union football coach. He was named as head coach of the Sharks team that plays in the Super Rugby competition. He was also the coach of the Sharks (Currie Cup) team that competes in the Currie Cup. He stepped down from his role as Head Coach after the Sharks suffered a huge defeat 35-0. He joined Edinburgh Rugby in 2023 and is currently their senior coach.
