= HJ Luus =

South African rugby union player

- Full name: HJ Luus
- Born: 18 March 1996 (age 30) South Africa
- Height: 1.85 m (6 ft 1 in)
- Weight: 110 kg (240 lb)

Rugby union career
- Position: Hooker
- Current team: Griquas
Senior career
Years	Team	Apps	(Points)
2020–	Griquas	14	(10)
- Correct as of 10 July 2022

HJ Luus (born 21 January 1988) is a South African rugby union player for the Griquas in the Currie Cup. His regular position is hooker.

Luus was named in the team for the first round of Super Rugby Unlocked against Bulls, making his debut in the process.
