= Pro14 Rainbow Cup =

Professional rugby union end-of-season cup competition

- Countries: Ireland; Italy; Scotland; Wales; South Africa
- Date: 23 April 2021 – 19 June 2021
- Champions: (Italy) Benetton
- Runners-up: (South Africa) Bulls
- Matches played: 40

Official website
- www.pro14.rugby

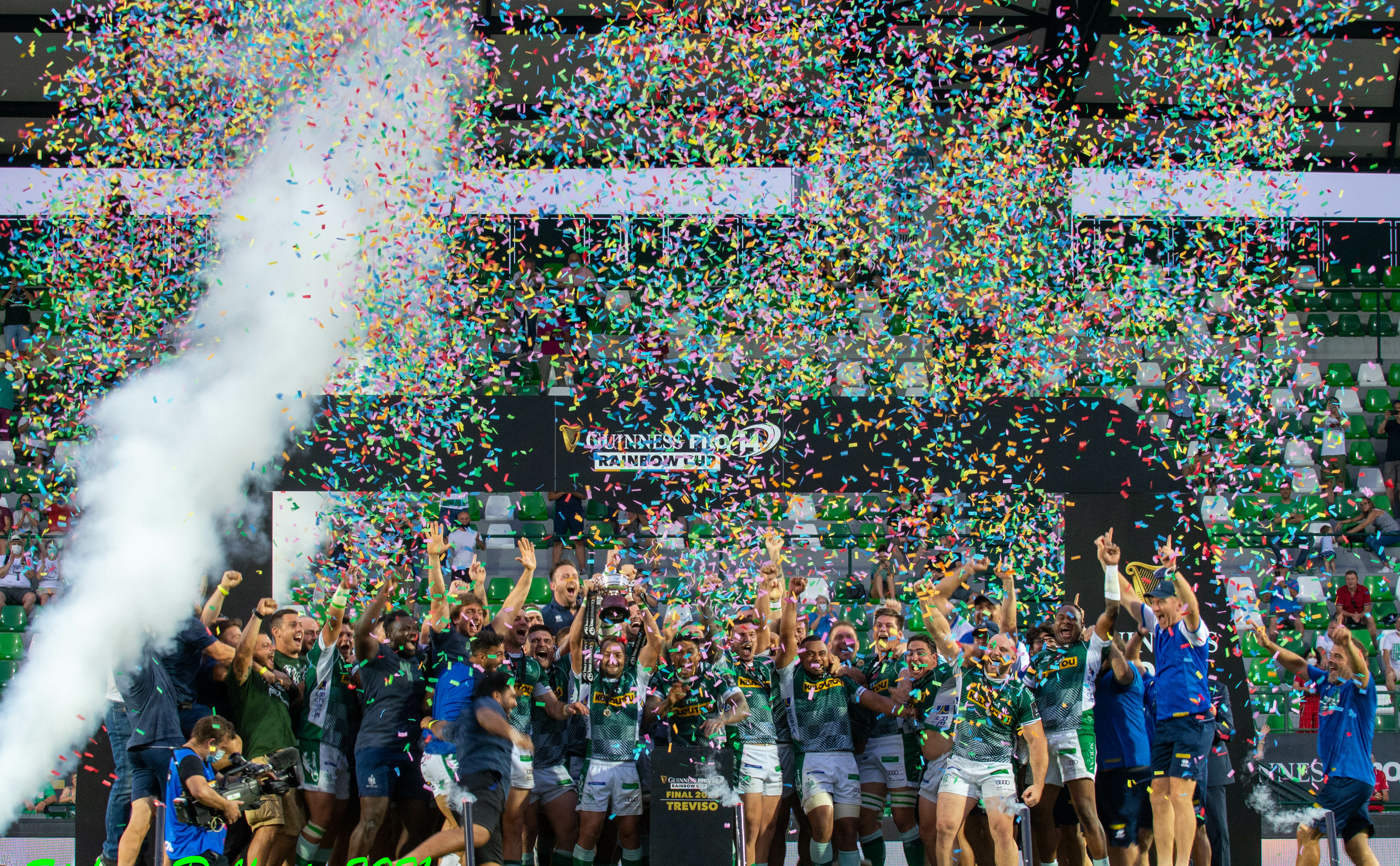
Finale Rainbow Cup 2021 Benetton Treviso WINS

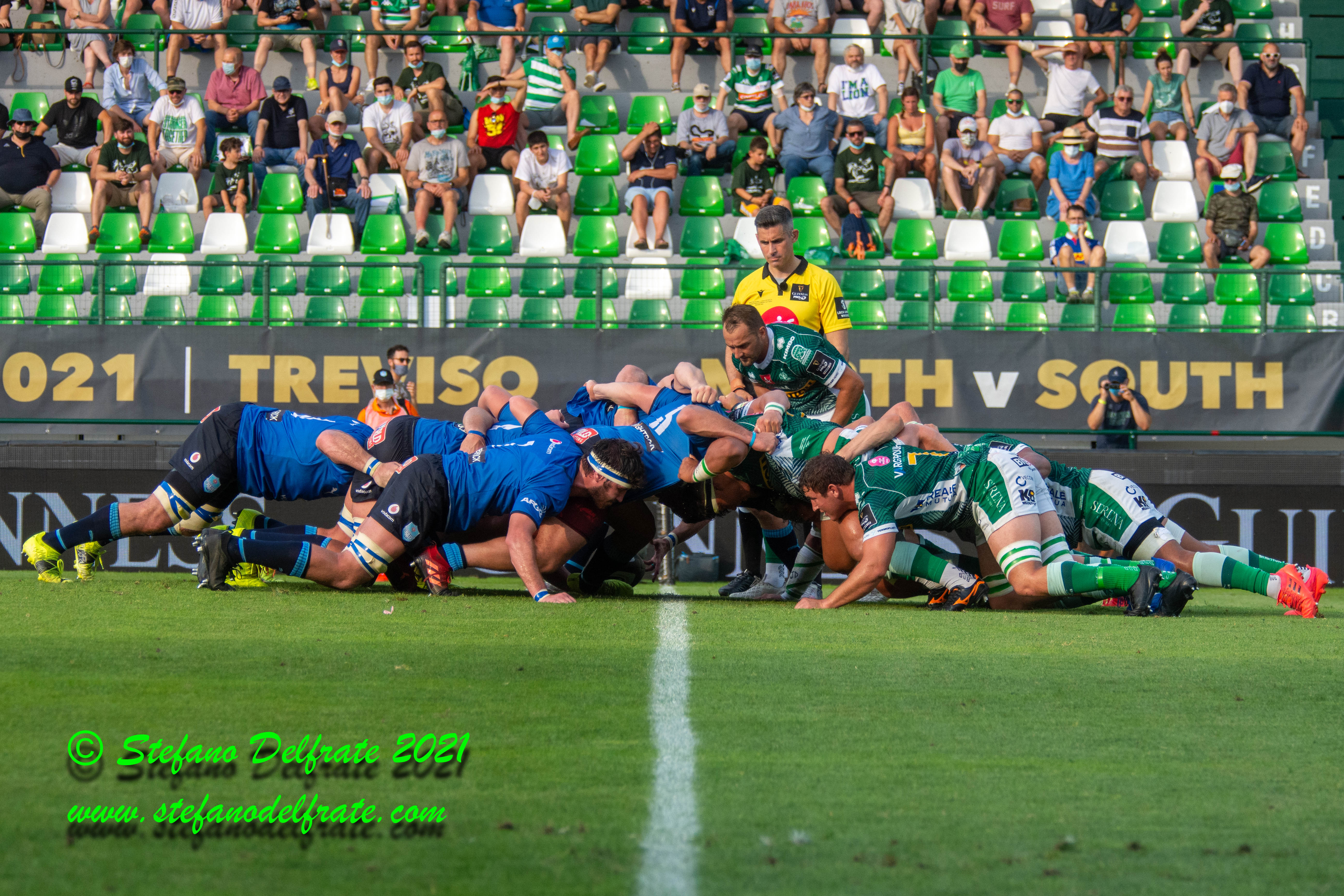
Finale Rainbow Cup 2021- Benetton Treviso vs Vodacom Blue Bulls-233 (51262041404)

The Pro14 Rainbow Cup (also known as the Guinness Pro14 Rainbow Cup for sponsorship reasons) was a professional rugby union end-of-season cup competition played in 2021 that consisted of two separate tournaments: the Rainbow Cup for twelve European clubs and the Rainbow Cup SA for four South African clubs. The winners of each competition then played a final match to determine the overall winner. The tournament operated as a shortened 'Spring season' to allow for the integration of the four new South African teams into the United Rugby Championship ahead of the 2021–22 season.

In winning the play-off final against the Bulls of South Africa, Benetton Treviso became the first Italian side ever to win any of the successor championships to the Celtic League.

== Background ==
The 2020–21 Pro14 was reduced to twelve teams as the two South African teams - the Cheetahs and Southern Kings - were not allowed to travel internationally in 2020 due to the COVID-19 pandemic. In September 2020, the Southern Kings ceased operations and the South African Rugby Union council began exploring the possibility of the four South African former Super Rugby teams - the Bulls, Lions, Sharks and Stormers - joining an expanded Pro14.

PRO14 Rugby announced in December 2020 that the 2020–21 Pro14 regular season would conclude after 16 rounds, and the top team from each conference would advance to a final in March 2021. The Pro14 Rainbow Cup then commenced in April and introduced the four new South African teams.

With South Africa hosting the British & Irish Lions tour in July–August 2021, the tournament also served as a warm-up event for the British, Irish and South African players hoping to be involved in the tour.

Between February and March eight South African franchises played in a "preparation series" also known as the Preparation Series to get valuable game time before the Rainbow Cup.

Due to several issues surrounding travel restrictions as a result of the pandemic, it was announced in April 2021 that the Rainbow Cup would adopt a dual tournament format and there would be no cross-hemisphere fixtures.

== Format ==
The competition format changed several times but eventually consisted of two separate tournaments running side by side. In the northern hemisphere's Rainbow Cup, the 12 Pro14 teams in Europe competed from 23 April until 12 June 2021. There were 6 match weekends over an 8-week period with each team receiving one additional bye week.

In the southern hemisphere's Rainbow Cup SA, each of the four teams played each other twice, a total of six rounds were played between 1 May and 12 June 2021. There was one fallow week in which each team received a bye week.

A final between the best placed Northern and Southern Hemisphere teams followed both tournaments on 19 June.

== Law variations ==
The Rainbow Cup saw three law variations trialled: Replacement for a red carded player after 20 minutes, Captain's Challenge and Goal-line dropouts. The replacement for a red carded player after 20 minutes allowed a side who has had a player sent-off to replace them with one of their named substitutes after a period of 20 minutes. A captain's challenge, similar to appeals used successfully in cricket and tennis, allowed each team to request a television match official review an offence in the build up to a try being scored or an act of foul play, or any referee's decision after the clock passes 75 minutes; where the referee's on-field decision was not changed, that team would no longer be able to challenge a decision thereafter. Goal-line dropouts were used if the ball is held-up over the line, knock-ons that occur in goal or when the ball is grounded by the defending team in the in-goal area after a kick through. All these law variations have previously been trialled in both Super Rugby Aotearoa and Super Rugby AU.

The captain's challenge law attracted widespread criticism, particularly after an incident in Munster's game against Cardiff where Munster's CJ Stander called for a captain's challenge on a Cardiff player returning the ball into a ruck, a minor technical offence. It was not adopted in subsequent tournaments.

World Rugby adopted the goal-line drop-out law more widely in the 2021–22 season and it has since become permanent.

== Teams ==
Location of Pro14 Rainbow Cup teams in Great Britain and Ireland.	Location of Pro14 Rainbow Cup teams in Italy. Location of PRO14 Rainbow Cup SA teams.

=== PRO14 Rainbow Cup ===
Team	Country	Coach / Director of Rugby	Captain	Stadium	Capacity
Benetton	Italy	(New Zealand) Kieran Crowley	(South Africa) Dewaldt Duvenage	Stadio Comunale di Monigo	6,700
Cardiff Blues	Wales	(Wales) Dai Young	(Wales) Ellis Jenkins	Cardiff Arms Park	12,125
Connacht	Ireland	(Australia) Andy Friend	(Australia) Jarrad Butler	Galway Sportsgrounds	8,129
Dragons	Wales	(England) Dean Ryan	(Wales) Rhodri Williams	Rodney Parade	8,700
Edinburgh	Scotland	(England) Richard Cockerill	(Scotland) Stuart McInally	Murrayfield Stadium	67,144
Glasgow Warriors	Scotland	(England) Danny Wilson	(Scotland) Fraser Brown (Scotland) Ryan Wilson	Scotstoun Stadium	7,351
Leinster	Ireland	(Ireland) Leo Cullen	(Ireland) Johnny Sexton	RDS Arena	18,500
Munster	Ireland	(South Africa) Johann van Graan	(Ireland) Peter O'Mahony	Thomond Park	25,600
Ospreys	Wales	(England) Toby Booth	(Wales) Justin Tipuric	Liberty Stadium	20,827
Scarlets	Wales	(New Zealand) Glenn Delaney	(Wales) Ken Owens	Parc y Scarlets	14,870
Ulster	Ireland	(England) Dan McFarland	(Ireland) Iain Henderson	Ravenhill Stadium	18,196
Zebre	Italy	(Ireland) Michael Bradley	(Italy) Tommaso Castello	Stadio Sergio Lanfranchi	5,000

=== PRO14 Rainbow Cup SA ===
Team	Country	Coach / Director of Rugby	Captain	Stadium	Capacity
Bulls	South Africa	(South Africa) Jake White	(South Africa) Duane Vermeulen	Loftus Versfeld	51,762
Lions	South Africa	(South Africa) Ivan van Rooyen	(South Africa) Dan Kriel	Ellis Park Stadium	62,567
Sharks	South Africa	(South Africa) Sean Everitt	(South Africa) Lukhanyo Am	Kings Park Stadium	52,000
Stormers	South Africa	(South Africa) John Dobson	(South Africa) Steven Kitshoff	Cape Town Stadium	55,000

== Tables ==
Pro14 Rainbow Cup
	Team	P	W	D	L	PF	PA	PD	TF	TA	Try bonus	Losing bonus	Pts
1	(Italy) Benetton	5	4	1	0	125	78	+47	14	10	2	0	22**
2	(Ireland) Munster	5	4	0	1	170	75	+95	23	8	3	1	20
3	(Scotland) Glasgow Warriors	5	4	0	1	121	117	+4	17	15	3	0	19
4	(Ireland) Leinster	5	3	0	2	124	87	+37	19	10	2	1	15
5	(Wales) Cardiff Blues	5	3	0	2	124	123	+1	16	16	2	1	15
6	(Ireland) Connacht	5	3	0	2	109	133	–24	15	18	2	0	14
7	(Wales) Scarlets	5	1	2	2	110	115	–5	13	15	2	1	13*
8	(Wales) Ospreys	5	2	1	2	103	88	+15	14	11	2	1	11**
9	(Scotland) Edinburgh	5	1	1	3	126	140	–14	18	19	2	2	10
10	(Ireland) Ulster	5	1	1	3	85	116	–31	12	18	2	2	8*
11	(Wales) Dragons	5	1	0	4	117	156	–39	14	22	2	1	7
12	(Italy) Zebre	5	0	0	5	88	174	-86	10	23	0	3	3
* Cancelled fixture: Scarlets awarded four match points. ** Cancelled fixture: Benetton awarded four match points.
If teams are level at any stage, tiebreakers are applied in the following order: 1. number of matches won; 2. the difference between points for and points against; 3. the number of tries scored; 4. the most points scored; 5. the difference between tries for and tries against; 6. the fewest red cards received; 7. the fewest yellow cards received.
Green background (row 1) is the play-off places and earn a place in the final against the 1st placed Rainbow Cup SA team.

Pro14 Rainbow Cup SA
	Team	P	W	D	L	PF	PA	PD	TF	TA	Try bonus	Losing bonus	Pts
1	(South Africa) Bulls	6	5	0	1	183	117	+66	22	12	4	1	25
2	(South Africa) Stormers	6	2	1	3	137	143	–6	16	19	2	3	17*
3	(South Africa) Sharks	6	3	0	3	153	179	–26	30	22	3	1	16
4	(South Africa) Lions	6	1	1	4	127	161	–34	16	22	3	1	8*
* Cancelled fixture: Stormers awarded four match points.
If teams are level at any stage, tiebreakers are applied in the following order: 1. number of matches won; 2. the difference between points for and points against; 3. the number of tries scored; 4. the most points scored; 5. the difference between tries for and tries against; 6. the fewest red cards received; 7. the fewest yellow cards received.
Green background (row 1) is the play-off places and earn a place in the final against the 1st placed Rainbow Cup team from Europe.

== PRO14 Rainbow Cup ==
All kickoff times are local.
League stage

=== Round 1 ===
23 April 2021
20:15

(2 BP) Ulster (Ireland)	24–26	(Ireland) Connacht (1 BP)
Try: Stockdale 23'; Herring 29' c Burns 44'; Shanahan 72' c Con: Cooney 30'; Lowry 73'	Report; Highlights	Try: Boyle 7' c Blade (2) 50' c 63 c Sullivan 80+3'; Con: Carty 8'; Daly (2) 52' 64'

Ravenhill Stadium
Referee: Andrew Brace

23 April 2021
20:15

Edinburgh (Scotland)	24–18	(Italy) Zebre (1 BP)

Murrayfield
Referee: Ben Whitehouse

24 April 2021
14:00

(1 BP) Benetton (Italy)	46–19	(Scotland) Glasgow Warriors

Stadio Comunale di Monigo
Referee: Marius Mitrea

24 April 2021
17:15

(1 BP) Ospreys (Wales)	36–14	(Wales) Cardiff Blues

Liberty Stadium
Referee: Sam Grove-White

24 April 2021
19:35

Leinster (Ireland)	3–27	(Ireland) Munster

RDS Arena
Referee: Chris Busby

25 April 2021
13:00

(1 BP) Dragons (Wales)	52–32	(Wales) Scarlets (1 BP)

Rodney Parade
Referee: Craig Evans

=== Round 2 ===
7 May 2021
19:00

(1 BP) Zebre (Italy)	20–25	(Italy) Benetton

Stadio Sergio Lanfranchi

7 May 2021
20:15

(1 BP) Munster (Ireland)	38–10	(Ireland) Ulster
Try: Scannell (2) 10' c 54' c Murray 26'; Haley c Hanrahan 57' c Conway 78'; Con: Hanrahan (4) 11' 40+1' 55' 59'	Report; Highlights; Full game	Try: Henderson 43'; Con: Lowry 45'; Pen: Lowry 2'

Thomond Park

7 May 2021
20:15

(1 BP) Glasgow Warriors (Scotland)	29–19	(Scotland) Edinburgh

Scotstoun Stadium

8 May 2021
19:35

Connacht (Ireland)	21–50	(Ireland) Leinster (1 BP)

Galway Sportsgrounds

8 May 2021
19:35

Scarlets (Wales)	22–6	(Wales) Ospreys

Parc y Scarlets

9 May 2021
13:00

Cardiff Blues (Wales)	17–16	(Wales) Dragons (1 BP)

Cardiff Arms Park

=== Round 3 ===
14 May 2021
18:00

(1 BP) Munster (Ireland)	20–24	(Ireland) Connacht

Thomond Park

14 May 2021
20:15

Leinster (Ireland)	21–17	(Ireland) Ulster (1 BP)
Try: Healy 25' c Conan 53' c Henshaw 61' c Con: Ringrose (3) 25' 54' 62'	Report; Highlights	Try: Baloucoune 18' c Gilroy 79' c Con: Burns 19'; Madigan 79'; Pen: Burns 51'

RDS Arena

15 May 2021
15:00

(1 BP) Scarlets (Wales)	28–29	(Wales) Cardiff Blues (1 BP)

Parc y Scarlets

15 May 2021
18:15

(1 BP) Benetton (Italy)	34–27	(Italy) Zebre (1 BP)

Stadio Comunale di Monigo

15 May 2021
19:35

(1 BP) Edinburgh (Scotland)	24–31	(Scotland) Glasgow Warriors (1 BP)

Murrayfield

16 May 2021
13:00

(1 BP) Dragons (Wales)	26–42	(Wales) Ospreys (1 BP)

Rodney Parade

=== Round 4 ===
28 May 2021
19:35

(1 BP) Munster (Ireland)	31–27	(Wales) Cardiff Blues (1 BP)

Thomond Park

29 May 2021
15:00

Ulster (Ireland)	Cancelled; 0–0 (Note: Ulster Rugby returned several positive COVID-19 tests and were therefore unable to field a team. Scarlets awarded four match points.)	(Wales) Scarlets

Ravenhill Stadium

29 May 2021
18:15

Benetton (Italy)	20–12	(Ireland) Connacht

Stadio Comunale di Monigo

29 May 2021
19:35

Dragons (Wales)	16–27	(Scotland) Glasgow Warriors (1 BP)

Cardiff City Stadium

Bye/s: (Scotland) Edinburgh, (Ireland) Leinster, (Wales) Ospreys, (Italy) Zebre

=== Round 5 ===
4 June 2021
18:00

(1 BP) Connacht (Ireland)	26–19	(Wales) Ospreys (1 BP)

The Sportsground

4 June 2021
20:15

Glasgow Warriors (Scotland)	15–12	(Ireland) Leinster (1 BP)

Scotstoun Stadium

5 June 2021
17:15

(2 BP) Edinburgh (Scotland)	31–34	(Ireland) Ulster (1 BP)
Try: Van der Merwe 3'; Kinghorn 7' c Schoeman 67' c Hutchison 73' c Sau 76'; Con: Kinghorn (3) 8' 67' 74'	Report; Highlights	Try: Hume 12' c Henderson 19' c McCloskey 27' c McBurney 38'; Lyttle 47'; Con: Madigan (3) 13' 19' 28'; Pen: Madigan 80+1'

Murrayfield

5 June 2021
19:35

(1 BP) Cardiff Blues (Wales)	37–12	(Italy) Zebre

Cardiff Arms Park

Bye/s: (Italy) Benetton, (Wales) Dragons, (Ireland) Munster, (Wales) Scarlets

=== Round 6 ===
11 June 2021
19:00

Zebre (Italy)	11–54	(Ireland) Munster (1 BP)

Stadio Sergio Lanfranchi

11 June 2021
20:15

(1 BP) Leinster (Ireland)	38–7	(Wales) Dragons

RDS Arena

12 June 2021
19:35

Ospreys (Wales)	Cancelled; 0–0 (Note: Ospreys returned several positive COVID-19 tests and were therefore unable to field a team. Benetton awarded four match points.)	(Italy) Benetton

Brewery Field

13 June 2021
13:00

(1 BP) Scarlets (Wales)	28–28	(Scotland) Edinburgh (1 BP)

Parc y Scarlets

Bye/s: (Wales) Cardiff Blues, (Ireland) Connacht, (Scotland) Glasgow Warriors, (Ireland) Ulster

== PRO14 Rainbow Cup SA ==
All kickoff times are local.
League stage

=== Round 1 ===
1 May 2021
14:00

(1 BP) Stormers (South Africa)	30–33	(South Africa) Sharks (1 BP)

Cape Town Stadium

1 May 2021
19:00

Bulls (South Africa)	22–9	(South Africa) Lions

Loftus Versfeld

=== Round 2 ===
8 May 2021
16:00

(1 BP) Sharks (South Africa)	34–26	(South Africa) Lions (1 BP)

Kings Park Stadium

8 May 2021
18:15

(1 BP) Stormers (South Africa)	16–20	(South Africa) Bulls

Cape Town Stadium

=== Round 3 ===
15 May 2021
13:30

(2 BP) Lions (South Africa)	37–39	(South Africa) Stormers (1 BP)

Ellis Park Stadium

15 May 2021
18:15

(1 BP) Bulls (South Africa)	43-9	(South Africa) Sharks

Loftus Versfeld

=== Round 4 ===
22 May 2021
13:00

(1 BP) Sharks (South Africa)	22–25	(South Africa) Stormers

Kings Park Stadium

22 May 2021
15:30

(1 BP) Lions (South Africa)	34–33	(South Africa) Bulls (2 BP)

Ellis Park Stadium

=== Round 5 ===
4 June 2021
19:00

(1 BP) Bulls (South Africa)	31–27	(South Africa) Stormers (2 BP)

Loftus Versfeld

5 June 2021
16:00

Lions (South Africa)	21–33	(South Africa) Sharks (1 BP)

Ellis Park Stadium

=== Round 6 ===
12 June 2021
16:00

Stormers (South Africa)	Cancelled; 0–0 (Note: Lions returned several positive COVID-19 tests and were therefore unable to field a team. Stormers awarded four match points.)	(South Africa) Lions

Cape Town Stadium

12 June 2021
18:15

Sharks (South Africa)	22–34	(South Africa) Bulls (1 BP)

Kings Park Stadium

== Final ==
The first-placed teams from each tournament, Benetton and Bulls, played in the final in Treviso. Benetton won 35–8 in front of their home crowd for a historic first win of an international competition for any Italian club.

19 June 2021
18:30 CEST (UTC+2)

Benetton (Italy)	35–8	(South Africa) Bulls
Try: Ioane 5' m Els 31' m Penalty try 40'; Lamaro 42' c Padovani 57' m Con: Garbisi (1/4) 43'; Pen: Garbisi (2/3) 20', 47'	Report	Try: Tambwe 26' m Con: Smith (0/1); Pen: Smith (1/1) 30'

Stadio Comunale di Monigo
Attendance: 1250
Referee: Frank Murphy (IRFU)
