= 2022 Currie Cup Premier Division =

Domestic rugby union competition

- Countries: South Africa
- Date: 14 January – 25 June
- Champions: Pumas (1st title)
- Runners-up: Griquas
- Matches played: 44
- Tries scored: 318 (average 7.2 per match)
- Top point scorer: Ruan Pienaar (Free State Cheetahs, 115)
- Top try scorer: Louis van der Westhuizen (Free State Cheetahs, 14)

The 2022 Currie Cup Premier Division was the 84th edition of the top tier of the Currie Cup, the premier domestic rugby union competition in South Africa. It was sponsored by beer brand Carling Black Label and organised by the South African Rugby Union.

The tournament was played from January to June in 2022, following the realignment of the South African domestic rugby union calendar to dovetail with the northern hemisphere and the United Rugby Championship, which features four South African sides.

The competition again featured seven sides, with SA Rugby rejecting a proposal from the Eastern Province Elephants to join the competition immediately, however the winner of the 2022 Currie Cup First Division would be promoted to the Premier Division for 2023, forming an eight team competition. The 2022 Currie Cup First Division began later in the year.

== Teams ==
Team locations in the 2022 Currie Cup Premier Division

The seven competing teams are:

2022 Currie Cup Premier Division
Team	Sponsored name	Stadium	Capacity
Blue Bulls	Vodacom Blue Bulls	Loftus Versfeld, Pretoria	51,762
Free State Cheetahs	Free State Cheetahs	Free State Stadium, Bloemfontein	48,000
Golden Lions	Sigma Golden Lions	Ellis Park Stadium, Johannesburg; Wits Rugby Stadium, Johannesburg	62,567; 5,000
Griquas	Windhoek Draught Griquas	Griqua Park, Kimberley	11,000
Pumas	Airlink Pumas	Mbombela Stadium, Mbombela	40,929
Sharks	Cell C Sharks	Kings Park Stadium, Durban	52,000
Western Province	DHL Western Province	Cape Town Stadium, Cape Town; Danie Craven Stadium, Stellenbosch	55,000; 16,000

== Regular season ==
=== Standings ===
2022 Currie Cup Premier Division standings
Pos	Team	Pld	W	D	L	PF	PA	PD	TF	TA	TB	LB	Pts	Qualification
1	Free State Cheetahs	12	10	0	2	403	250	+153	54	30	7	1	48	Semifinals
2	Blue Bulls	12	9	1	2	398	306	+92	56	42	9	0	47	Semifinals
3	Griquas	12	7	0	5	383	345	+38	48	42	6	2	36	Semifinals
4	Pumas	12	5	0	7	334	293	+41	43	32	6	3	29	Semifinals
5	Sharks	12	5	1	6	255	284	−29	26	34	3	2	27	
6	Western Province	12	3	0	9	294	381	−87	36	52	3	4	19	
7	Golden Lions	12	2	0	10	278	486	−208	35	66	5	2	15	

Source: springboks.rugby

Tournament points in the standings were awarded to teams as follows:

- 4 points for a win.
- 2 points for a draw.
- 1 bonus point for a loss in a match by seven points or under.
- 1 bonus point for scoring four tries or more.

Teams were ranked in the standings firstly by tournament points then by: (a) points difference from all matches (points scored less points conceded); (b) tries difference from all matches (tries scored less tries conceded); (c) points difference from the matches between the tied teams; (d) points scored in all matches; (e) tries scored in all matches; and, if needed, (f) a coin toss.

=== Round-by-round ===
The table below shows the progression of all teams throughout the Currie Cup season. Each team's tournament points on the standings log is shown for each round, with the overall log position in brackets.

2022 Currie Cup team progression
Team	R1	R2	R3	R4	R5	R6	R7	R8	R9	R10	R11	R12	R13	R14	Semi	Final
Blue Bulls	5 (1st)	10 (1st)	10 (1st)	10 (3rd)	15 (3rd)	20 (2nd)	25 (2nd)	30 (1st)	32 (1st)	37 (1st)	42 (1st)	47 (1st)	47 (1st)	47 (2nd)	Lost	DNQ
Free State Cheetahs	4 (3rd)	4 (4th)	9 (2nd)	13 (2nd)	18 (1st)	22 (1st)	26 (1st)	26 (2nd)	31 (2nd)	36 (2nd)	41 (2nd)	41 (2nd)	43 (2nd)	48 (1st)	Lost	DNQ
Golden Lions	1 (4th)	1 (7th)	1 (7th)	2 (7th)	2 (7th)	2 (7th)	2 (7th)	2 (7th)	3 (7th)	3 (7th)	5 (7th)	10 (7th)	15 (7th)	15 (7th)	DNQ	DNQ
Griquas	0 (6th)	1 (6th)	5 (4th)	9 (4th)	10 (4th)	15 (4th)	15 (4th)	16 (4th)	20 (4th)	21 (4th)	21 (4th)	26 (3rd)	31 (3rd)	36 (3rd)	Won	Lost
Pumas	0 (7th)	5 (2nd)	5 (5th)	5 (6th)	5 (6th)	5 (6th)	10 (5th)	15 (5th)	15 (5th)	19 (5th)	20 (5th)	22 (5th)	27 (4th)	29 (4th)	Won	Won
Sharks	0 (5th)	4 (5th)	9 (3rd)	14 (1st)	18 (2nd)	18 (3rd)	18 (3rd)	22 (3rd)	24 (3rd)	24 (3rd)	24 (3rd)	24 (4th)	26 (5th)	27 (5th)	DNQ	DNQ
Western Province	5 (2nd)	5 (3rd)	5 (6th)	6 (5th)	6 (5th)	7 (5th)	7 (6th)	8 (6th)	9 (6th)	9 (6th)	13 (6th)	13 (6th)	15 (6th)	19 (6th)	DNQ	DNQ
Key:	Win	Draw	Loss	No match	Bye											

=== Matches ===
Listed below are all matches for the double round-robin, played for the 2022 Currie Cup Premier Division.

==== Round 1 ====
14 January 2022	Pumas	19–33	Blue Bulls	Mbombela Stadium, Mbombela
19:00	Try: Penalty try 75'; Pen: De Beer (4/5) 29', 45', 59', 62'	Report	Try: Papier 5' m Nortjé 54' c Grobbelaar 67' m WJ Steenkamp 78' c Con: Smith (2/4) 55', 79'; Pen: Smith (3/4) 20', 22', 48'; Cards: Gqoboka (yellow card) 75'; Manjezi (yellow card) 80+1'	Referee: Cwengile Jadezweni

15 January 2022	Free State Cheetahs	30–20	Griquas	Free State Stadium, Bloemfontein
14:30	Try: M. van der Merwe 30' c Brits 37' c Van der Westhuizen 55' c Con: Pienaar (3/3) 35', 38', 57'; Pen: Pienaar (3/3) 11', 17', 35'	Report	Try: Steenkamp 42' c Obi 77' c Con: Du Plessis (2/2) 43', 78'; Pen: Du Plessis (2/2) 7', 53'	Referee: Jaco Peyper

15 January 2022	Western Province	48–36	Golden Lions	Cape Town Stadium, Cape Town
17:00	Try: Smith 2' c Davids (3) 23' c, 40' c, 60' m Solomon 31' m Dayimani 46' c Fourie 68' c Con: Swiel (4/6) 3', 24', 40+1', 47'; Schreuder (1/1) 69'; Pen: Swiel (1/1) 14'; Cards: Smith (yellow card) 34' to 42'; Masimla (yellow card) 74'	Report	Try: D. Venter 10' m Snyman 37' c Strydom 50' c Hansen 62' c Osuagwu 78' c Con: Isaacs (4/5) 38', 51', 64', 78'; Pen: Isaacs (1/1) 22'; Cards: Ncube (yellow card) 43' to 54'	Referee: AJ Jacobs

Bye/s: Sharks

==== Round 2 ====
19 January 2022	Golden Lions	9–50	Pumas	Ellis Park Stadium, Johannesburg
15:30	Pen: Isaacs (3/4) 26', 38', 41'	Report	Try: Williams 16' c Maartens 28' c Fourie 40+2' c De Beer 44' c Raw 63' m Classen 68' c Valentyn 78' c Con: De Beer (6/7) 17', 30', 40+3', 45', 69', 79'; Pen: De Beer (1/2) 14'	Referee: Aimee Barrett-Theron

19 January 2022	Sharks	24–23	Griquas	Kings Park Stadium, Durban
17:45	Try: Wright 27' c Jooste 41' m Con: Chait (1/1) 28'; Pen: Chait (1/2) 20'; Koster (1/2) 51'; Nohamba (2/2) 68', 77'; Cards: Noah (red card) 61'	Report	Try: Forwood 61' c Xamlashe 79' c Con: Du Plessis (2/2) 62', 80'; Pen: Du Plessis (3/6) 30', 37', 72'	Referee: Rasta Rasivhenge

19 January 2022	Western Province	19–40	Blue Bulls	Cape Town Stadium, Cape Town
20:00	Try: Xaba 65' c Leyds 77' c Theunissen 80+1' m Con: Swiel (2/3) 66', 78'; Cards: Morabe (yellow card) 18' to 29'	Report	Try: Verity-Amm 2' c Moodie 14' c Matanzima 20' c Brink 28' c B. du Plessis 43' m Jansen van Vuren 57' c Con: Steyn (5/6) 3', 15', 21', 28', 58'; Cards: Wessels (red card) 79'	Referee: Marius van der Westhuizen

Bye/s: Free State Cheetahs

==== Round 3 ====
2 February 2022	Griquas	41–20	Pumas	Griqua Park, Kimberley
15:30	Try: Penalty try 26'; Van Rooyen 40' m Hartzenberg 66' m Pen: Du Plessis (8/8) 1', 9', 36', 43', 50', 59', 65', 69'	Report	Try: Fourie 5' m Stighling 28' m Raw 56' c Con: Fouché (1/1) 57'; Pen: De Beer (1/1) 19'; Cards: Maartens (yellow card) 26' to 36' (red card) 79'; Prinsloo (yellow card) 39' to 48'; Valentyn (yellow card) 59' to 70'; Mgijima (yellow card) 76'	Referee: Aimee Barrett-Theron

2 February 2022	Blue Bulls	25–38	Free State Cheetahs	Loftus Versfeld, Pretoria
17:45	Try: Hanekom 8' c Jacobs 14' c Novuka 68' m Con: Smith (2/3) 9', 15'; Pen: Smith (1/2) 3'; Drop: Smith 18'; Cards: Ludwig (yellow card) 55' to 66'; Gqoboka (yellow card) 64' to 75'	Report	Try: Specman 6' c Van der Westhuizen (2) 11' c, 57' c Blommetjies 20' m Davis 46' c Ntsila 65' m Con: Pienaar (4/6) 7', 12', 47', 58'; Cards: G. van der Merwe (yellow card) 62' to 73'	Referee: Paul Mente

2 February 2022	Sharks	35–20	Western Province	Kings Park Stadium, Durban
20:00	Try: Radebe 25' c Gumede 43' c Mbatha 48' m Potgieter 53' c Con: Bosch (3/4) 27', 44', 55'; Pen: Bosch (3/4) 21', 39', 52'; Cards: Penxe (yellow card) 29' to 40'	Report	Try: Zas 34' c Wolhuter 71' c Con: Swiel (2/2) 34', 72'; Pen: Swiel (2/2) 10', 34'; Cards: Swiel (yellow card) 39' to 50'	Referee: Griffin Colby

Bye/s: Golden Lions

==== Round 4 ====
18 February 2022	Griquas	22–20	Western Province	Griqua Park, Kimberley
19:00	Try: Schutte 56' m Du Rand 71' m Pen: Du Plessis (3/4) 6', 11', 20'; Cards: Dube (yellow card) 79'	Report	Try: Zas (2) 8' c, 79' c Con: Swiel (2/2) 9', 79'; Pen: Swiel (2/3) 39', 52'; Cards: Dixon (yellow card) 23' to 34'	Referee: Jaco Peyper

19 February 2022	Pumas	17–28	Free State Cheetahs	Mbombela Stadium, Mbombela
14:30	Try: Swart 50' m Pen: Fouché (4/4) 2', 21', 26', 36'	Report	Try: G. van der Merwe 12' m Blommetjies 17' c Van der Westhuizen 45' c Con: Pienaar (2/3) 17', 46'; Pen: Pienaar (2/2) 4', 62'; Steyn (1/1) 77'	Referee: Morné Ferreira

19 February 2022	Golden Lions	31–43	Sharks	Ellis Park Stadium, Johannesburg
17:00	Try: Hansen 8' c E. Tshituka 48' m D. Rossouw 54' c M. Brandon 70' c Mollentze 77' m Con: Isaacs (3/4) 9', 55', 71'	Report	Try: Potgieter 10' c Wright 26' c Bholi 44' m Gumede 51' m Jooste 66' c Con: Chamberlain (2/4) 11', 27'; Nohamba (1/1) 67'; Pen: Chamberlain (2/2) 31', 40+1'; Nohamba (2/2) 57', 63'; Cards: Wright (yellow card) 46' to 56'; Gertse (yellow card) 68' to 78'; Noah (yellow card) 75'	Referee: AJ Jacobs

Bye/s: Blue Bulls

==== Round 5 ====
4 March 2022	Pumas	10–24	Sharks	Mbombela Stadium, Mbombela
19:00	Try: Lungisa 37' c Con: De Beer (1/1) 38'; Pen: De Beer (1/2) 35'	Report	Pen: Chamberlain (8/8) 9', 14', 17', 31', 47', 71', 76', 80'; Cards: Koster (yellow card) 34' to 44'	Referee: Jaco Peyper

5 March 2022	Griquas	27–53	Blue Bulls	Griqua Park, Kimberley
14:30	Try: Du Plessis (2) 13' c, 57' c Sirgel 36' m Amiras 77' m Con: Du Plessis (2/4) 14', 58'; Drop: Boshoff 21'	Report	Try: Matanzima 9' c Hendricks 24' m W. Steenkamp 28' c Botha 43' c Moodie 53' c Du Plessis 62' c Johannes 73' c Con: Smith (6/7) 10', 29', 44', 54', 63', 74'; Pen: Smith (2/2) 23', 58'	Referee: AJ Jacobs

5 March 2022	Free State Cheetahs	66–14	Golden Lions	Free State Stadium, Bloemfontein
17:00	Try: Jaer 9' m Kasende (2) 12' c, 76' c Arnoldi (2) 16' m, 20' c Penalty try 27'; G. van der Merwe 39' c Van der Westhuizen 47' c Van Vuuren 58' c Rudolph 64' c Con: Pienaar (5/7) 13', 22', 40', 48', 60'; Steyn (1/1) 65'; Fortuin (1/1) 78'	Report	Try: Cairns 29' c Botha 43' c Con: Swanepoel (2/2) 29', 44'; Cards: Sangweni (yellow card) 27' to 37'	Referee: Cwengile Jadezweni

Bye/s: Western Province

==== Round 6 ====
16 March 2022	Griquas	49–17	Golden Lions	Griqua Park, Kimberley
15:30	Try: Hartzenberg 16' c Mulder 34' c Xamlashe 44' c Dube 52' c Zito 55' c Jonker 67' c Sirgel 76' c Con: Du Plessis (5/5) 17', 35', 45', 53', 58'; Davids (2/2) 68', 78'; Cards: Pretorius (yellow card) 38' to 49'	Report	Try: Mollentze 63' c D. Rossouw 70' c Con: Tedder (2/2) 64', 71'; Pen: Tedder (1/1) 5'	Referee: Griffin Colby

16 March 2022	Free State Cheetahs	24–17	Western Province	Free State Stadium, Bloemfontein
17:45	Try: M. van der Merwe 46' c G. van der Merwe 52' c Fortuin 70' c Con: Pienaar (3/3) 47', 54', 72'; Pen: Pienaar (1/1) 70'	Report	Try: Davids 67' c Smit 80+2' c Con: Wolhuter (2/2) 68', 80+3'; Pen: Wolhuter (1/2) 16'; Cards: Xaba (yellow card) 69'	Referee: Morné Ferreira

16 March 2022	Blue Bulls	35–21	Sharks	Loftus Versfeld, Pretoria
20:00	Try: Tambwe 8' c Penalty try 16'; Johannes 45' c Botha 59' c Louw 72' c Con: Steyn (4/4) 10', 45', 60', 72'	Report	Try: Koster 1' m Potgieter 31' c Con: Chait (1/2) 32'; Pen: Chait (1/3) 13'; Radebe (1/1) 48'; Cards: Gumede (yellow card) 15' to 26'; Andrews (yellow card) 16' to 27'	Referee: Marius van der Westhuizen

Bye/s: Pumas

==== Round 7 ====
23 March 2022	Western Province	11–37	Pumas	Cape Town Stadium, Cape Town
15:00	Try: Davids 9' m Pen: Wolhuter (2/2) 18', 50'; Cards: Masimla (yellow card) 43' to 53'	Report	Try: De Klerk (2) 3' m, 51' c Lungisa 43' c Engelbrecht 63' c Mafura 72' m Con: Fouché (3/5) 44', 53', 64'; Pen: Fouché (2/3) 7', 47'	Referee: Griffin Colby

23 March 2022	Sharks	15–29	Free State Cheetahs	Kings Park Stadium, Durban
17:45	Try: Mbatha 38' c Jooste 49' m Con: Díaz Bonilla (1/2) 39'; Pen: Díaz Bonilla (1/1) 32'	Report	Try: Ntsila 22' c Van der Westhuizen 64' m G. van der Merwe 69' m Con: Pienaar (1/3) 23'; Pen: Pienaar (2/3) 9', 53'; Steyn (2/2) 12', 20'; Cards: Van Vuuren (yellow card) 47' to 59'	Referee: Morné Ferreira

23 March 2022	Golden Lions	10–40	Blue Bulls	Ellis Park Stadium, Johannesburg
20:00	Try: Claasens 56' c Con: Tedder (1/1) 56'; Pen: Tedder (1/2) 42'; Cards: Ncube (yellow card) 27' to 38'; Ndlovu (yellow card) 66' to 77'	Report	Try: Penalty try 31'; Verity-Amm 36' c Steyn 51' c Uys 59' c Van Zyl 69' m C. Dlamini 73' c Con: Mostert (1/1) 38'; Steyn (3/4) 53', 60', 74'	Referee: Marius van der Westhuizen

Bye/s: Griquas

==== Round 8 ====
6 April 2022	Pumas	45–10	Golden Lions	Mbombela Stadium, Mbombela
15:30	Try: Swart 6' m De Klerk 13' c Fourie 22' c De Beer 27' c Williams 55' c Engelbrecht 58' m Visagie 74' c Con: Fouché (5/7) 14', 23', 28', 56', 76'	Report	Try: Du Toit 38' m Ndlovu 62' m	Referee: Cwengile Jadezweni

6 April 2022	Griquas	6–13	Sharks	Griqua Park, Kimberley
17:45	Pen: Whitehead (2/2) 16', 40'	Report	Try: Mbatha 8' c Con: Díaz Bonilla (1/1) 9'; Pen: Díaz Bonilla (2/3) 22', 77'; Cards: J. Venter (yellow card) 35' to 48'	Referee: AJ Jacobs

6 April 2022	Blue Bulls	45–34	Western Province	Loftus Versfeld, Pretoria
20:00	Try: Hunt 21' c Johannes 29' c D. Kriel (2) 48' c, 58' c Gqoboka 70' c Penalty try 75'; Con: Steyn (5/5) 22', 30', 49', 60', 71'; Pen: Steyn (1/1) 10'	Report	Try: Kotze 18' m Theunissen 38' c Smit 51' c Leyds 72' m Davids 78' c Con: Swiel (2/3) 39', 52'; Wolhuter (1/2) 79'; Pen: Swiel (1/1) 40+1'; Cards: Smit (yellow card) 28' to 39'; Taylor (yellow card) 60' to 71'; Xaba (yellow card) 75'	Referee: Griffin Colby

Bye/s: Free State Cheetahs

==== Round 9 ====
14 April 2022	Golden Lions	17–23	Griquas	Wits Rugby Stadium, Johannesburg
15:00	Try: Swanepoel 59' c Hansen 72' c Con: Swanepoel (2/2) 60', 73'; Pen: Swanepoel (1/2) 34'	Report	Try: Hartzenberg 18' c A. Davids 78' c Con: Whitehead (2/2) 19', 79'; Pen: Whitehead (3/3) 4', 29', 45'; Cards: Du Plessis (yellow card) 53' to 64'; Whitehead (yellow card) 69' to 79'	Referee: Cwengile Jadezweni

15 April 2022	Western Province	21–28	Free State Cheetahs	Cape Town Stadium, Cape Town
16:45	Try: Leyds 35' c Davids 42' m Con: Swiel (1/2) 36'; Pen: Swiel (3/3) 17', 24', 39'	Report	Try: Tshakweni 13' c Van der Westhuizen (2) 47' c, 70' c Brits 51' c Con: Pienaar (4/4) 14', 48', 52', 71'; Cards: Tshakweni (yellow card) 23' to 38'	Referee: AJ Jacobs

16 April 2022	Sharks	0–0 (Note: The match between the Sharks and Blue Bulls was cancelled due to flooding in the KwaZulu-Natal region. The match is declared a draw and both sides are awarded 2 log points.)	Blue Bulls	Kings Park Stadium, Durban
17:00

Bye/s: Pumas

==== Round 10 ====
6 May 2022	Sharks	10–20	Pumas	Kings Park Stadium, Durban
16:45	Try: Mbatha 47' c Con: Chamberlain (1/1) 48'; Drop: Chamberlain 28'	Report	Try: Williams (2) 8' c, 35' c Con: Fouché (2/2) 9', 35'; Pen: Fouché (2/3) 3', 59'	Referee: AJ Jacobs

6 May 2022	Golden Lions	26–35	Free State Cheetahs	Ellis Park Stadium, Johannesburg
19:00	Try: Pienaar 10' c Ncusane 40+1' c Con: Swanepoel (2/2) 11', 40+2'; Pen: Swanepoel (4/7) 15', 23', 46', 55'; Cards: White (yellow card) 69'; Sangweni (yellow card) 78'	Report	Try: G. van der Merwe 26' c M. van der Merwe (2) 36' c, 74' m Saal 64' c Con: Pienaar (3/4) 27', 37', 66'; Pen: Pienaar (3/4) 49', 68', 78'; Cards: G. van der Merwe (yellow card) 40+1' to 51'	Referee: Cwengile Jadezweni

7 May 2022	Blue Bulls	48–38	Griquas	Loftus Versfeld, Pretoria
17:00	Try: Jacobs (2) 5' m, 20' c Brink 18' c Ludwig 29' c Moodie 37' c Wessels 43' m Vorster 63' c Con: Smith (5/7) 18', 21', 29', 39', 64'; Pen: Smith (1/1) 11'; Cards: Gqoboka (yellow card) 51' to 62'; Tambwe (yellow card) 52' to 62'	Report	Try: Xamlashe 9' m Penalty try 51'; Hartzenberg 54' c Sirgel (2) 60' m, 69' c Hollis 73' c Con: Du Plessis (3/4) 54', 69', 74'; Cards: Obi (yellow card) 78'	Referee: Morné Ferreira

Bye/s: Western Province

==== Round 11 ====
13 May 2022	Pumas	17–23	Western Province	Mbombela Stadium, Mbombela
19:00	Try: Swart 19' m Fourie 26' m September 58' c Con: Fouché (1/3) 58'; Cards: Lungisa (yellow card) 41' to 51'	Report	Try: Masimla 9' c Fouché 14' m Petersen 29' m Con: Swiel (1/3) 10'; Pen: Swiel (2/3) 23', 59'; Cards: Dixon (yellow card) 40+1' to 49'; Van Rhyn (yellow card) 51' to 62'	Referee: Morné Ferreira

14 May 2022	Free State Cheetahs	44–15	Sharks	Free State Stadium, Bloemfontein
14:30	Try: Sekekete 2' c M. van der Merwe 11' m Jasper 26' m Ntsila 40+1' c Mosi 47' c Van der Westhuizen 73' c Con: Pienaar (3/5) 4', 40+2', 48'; Masuku 74'; Pen: Pienaar (1/1) 57'; Masuku (1/1) 68'; Cards: Dawson (yellow card) 51' to 62'	Report	Try: Wright 15' c Jooste 52' m Con: Chamberlain (1/2) 16'; Pen: Chamberlain (1/2) 7'	Referee: Jaco Peyper

14 May 2022	Blue Bulls	43–37	Golden Lions	Loftus Versfeld, Pretoria
17:00	Try: Gqoboka 10' c B. du Plessis 16' c D. Kriel 20' c Swanepoel 30' c Gans 33' c R. Kriel 76' m Con: Mostert (4/4) 12', 18', 21', 34'; Johannes (1/2) 31'; Pen: Johannes (1/1) 58'; Cards: Ludwig (yellow card) 38' to 47'; B. du Plessis (yellow card) 51' to 61'	Report	Try: Schoeman 13' c Odendaal 40+2' c F. Horn 54' m Hendrikse 60' m Sangweni 71' c Con: Hendrikse (3/5) 14', 40+3', 72'; Pen: Hendrikse (2/2) 27', 74'; Cards: Odendaal (yellow card) 19' to 29'; Pienaar (yellow card) 32' to 42'	Referee: Griffin Colby

Bye/s: Griquas

==== Round 12 ====
27 May 2022	Blue Bulls	31–26	Pumas	Loftus Versfeld, Pretoria
19:00	Try: Penalty try 17'; D. Kriel (2) 33' m, 59' m Vermaak 45' c Verity-Amm 54' c Con: Steyn (2/3) 46', 55'; Cards: Du Plessis (yellow card) 78'	Report	Try: De Klerk (3) 5' m, 12' c, 37' c Swart 19' c Con: E. Fouché (3/4) 14', 20', 38'; Cards: De Klerk (yellow card) 17' to 30'; De Beer (red card) 33'; Mafura (yellow card) 67' to 78'	Referee: Marius van der Westhuizen

28 May 2022	Griquas	46–18	Free State Cheetahs	Griqua Park, Kimberley
14:30	Try: Xamlashe 1' c Mulder 8' m Uys 18' m Obi (2) 29' c, 41' c Du Rand 48' m Penalty try 68'; Con: Du Plessis (3/6) 2', 30', 43'; Pen: Whitehead (1/1) 74'	Report	Try: Mosi 36' m Rudolph 70' m Van der Westhuizen 78' m Pen: Pienaar (1/1) 22'; Cards: Masuku (yellow card) 17' to 28'; Van Vuuren (yellow card) 69' to 80+1'	Referee: Cwengile Jadezweni

28 May 2022	Golden Lions	33–10	Western Province	Ellis Park Stadium, Johannesburg
17:00	Try: Brandon 3' m Pienaar 8' c Q. Horn 22' m Swanepoel 71' c Con: Swanepoel (2/4) 10', 72'; Pen: Swanepoel (3/3) 35', 64', 68'; Cards: Schoeman (yellow card) 47' to 58'	Report	Try: Xaba 47' c Con: Swiel (1/1) 48'; Pen: Swiel (1/1) 8'	Referee: Stephan Geldenhuys

Bye/s: Sharks

==== Round 13 ====
3 June 2022	Western Province	41–43	Griquas	Danie Craven Stadium, Stellenbosch
16:00	Try: Leyds 1' c Van Zyl 6' c De Jongh 10' c Davids 20' c Swiel 23' c Con: Swiel (5/5) 2', 7', 11', 21', 24'; Pen: Swiel (2/3) 43', 53'; Cards: Vermaak (yellow card) 58' to 69'	Report	Try: Jonker 15' c Xamlashe 32' c Hartzenberg 37' m Uys 59' m Obi (2) 69' c, 80+5' c Sirgel 76' m Con: Whitehead (4/7) 15', 33', 69', 80+6'	Referee: Morné Ferreira

3 June 2022	Free State Cheetahs	28–29	Pumas	Free State Stadium, Bloemfontein
19:00	Try: Van der Westhuizen (2) 16' c, 54' c G. van der Merwe 45' c Kasende 72' c Con: Pienaar (4/4) 17', 46', 55', 74'	Report	Try: Williams (2) 7' c, 40' m De Beer 32' c Swart 50' c Con: Fouché (3/4) 7', 33', 51'; Pen: Fouché (1/2) 59'; Cards: Maqondwana (yellow card) 53' to 65'	Referee: AJ Jacobs

4 June 2022	Sharks	32–38	Golden Lions	Kings Park Stadium, Durban
17:00	Try: Bholi 5' c Alexander (2) 36' c, 40' m Potgieter 59' c Con: Díaz Bonilla (3/4) 5', 38', 60'; Pen: Díaz Bonilla (1/1) 2'; Drop: Díaz Bonilla 79'; Cards: Bholi (yellow card) 51' to 62'	Report	Try: Van Wyk (2) 10' c, 19' c Penalty try (2) 46', 52'; Schoeman 55' c Con: Swanepoel (3/3) 11', 20', 56'; Pen: Swanepoel (1/1) 71'; Cards: Nohamba (yellow card) 36' to 45'	Referee: Cwengile Jadezweni

Bye/s: Blue Bulls

==== Round 14 ====
10 June 2022	Western Province	28–21	Sharks	Danie Craven Stadium, Stellenbosch
16:00	Try: Petersen 30' m Bursey 34' c Alexander 54' c Con: Smit (2/3) 35', 55'; Pen: Smit (3/3) 24', 69', 80'	Report	Try: Notshe 46' c Roets 52' c Potgieter 61' c Con: Chamberlain (3/3) 46', 53', 62'	Referee: AJ Jacobs

10 June 2022	Pumas	44–45	Griquas	Mbombela Stadium, Mbombela
19:00	Try: Mafura (2) 30' c, 52' c Prinsloo 36' c September 38' c Stighling 64' c Con: E. Fouché (5/5) 31', 37', 40', 54', 65'; Pen: E. Fouché (2/2) 7', 18'; Drop: De Beer 33'; Cards: Maqondwana (yellow card) 24' to 34'; Engelbrecht (yellow card) 46' to 56'	Report	Try: Ungerer 12' c Sirgel 24' c Mulder 42' c Hartzenberg 56' c Jonker 62' c Gouws 77' c Con: Whitehead (2/2) 14', 25'; Boshoff (4/4) 43', 57', 63', 77'; Pen: Boshoff (1/1) 80'	Referee: Marius van der Westhuizen

11 June 2022	Free State Cheetahs	35–5	Blue Bulls	Free State Stadium, Bloemfontein
14:30	Try: Van der Westhuizen (2) 2' c, 14' c Kasende 25' c Brits 32' c Blommetjies 47' c Con: Pienaar (5/5) 3', 15', 27', 33', 48'	Report	Try: Gans 52' m Cards: Tobias (yellow card) 44' to 54'	Referee: Cwengile Jadezweni

Bye/s: Golden Lions

== Play-offs ==
=== Semifinals ===
17 June 2022	Blue Bulls	19–30	Griquas	Loftus Versfeld, Pretoria
19:00	Try: Gqoboka 24' c Van der Linde 71' c Mostert 79' m Con: Mostert (2/3) 25', 71'; Cards: Van Rooyen (yellow card) 47' to 58'; Smit (yellow card) 74'	Report	Try: Sirgel 53' c Whitehead 65' c Penalty try 74'; Con: Whitehead (2/2) 55', 67'; Pen: Whitehead (3/3) 40+2', 41', 50'	Referee: Griffin Colby

18 June 2022	Free State Cheetahs	35–38	Pumas	Free State Stadium, Bloemfontein
13:30	Try: Rudolph (2) 15' c, 41' m Penalty try 31'; Blommetjies 39' c Con: Masuku (2/3) 16', 40'; Pen: Masuku (3/3) 34', 47', 69'; Cards: Specman (yellow card) 74'	Report	Try: E. Fouché 6' c De Klerk (2) 19' m, 24' m Snyman 62' c Raw 75' c Mgijima 78' c Con: E. Fouché (2/4) 7', 63'; De Beer (2/2) 76', 80'; Cards: Maartens (yellow card) 31' to 43'	Referee: Morné Ferreira

=== Final ===
25 June 2022	Griquas	19–26	Pumas	Griqua Park, Kimberley
15:00	Try: Hartzenberg 57' c Con: Whitehead (1/1) 58'; Pen: Whitehead (4/5) 4', 20', 30', 78'	Report; Match Summary	Try: Williams 22' c Swart 38' m Engelbrecht 49' m Con: E. Fouché (1/3) 23'; Pen: E. Fouché (3/3) 2', 34', 45'	Attendance: 10 988; Referee: Cwengile Jadezweni

Griquas	Pumas

Griquas:
FB	15	George Whitehead
RW	14	Munier Hartzenberg
OC	13	Sango Xamlashe (c)
IC	12	Rynhardt Jonker
LW	11	Luther Obi
FH	10	Zander du Plessis	(substituted off) 51'
SH	9	Stefan Ungerer	(substituted off) 40'
N8	8	Sibabalo Qoma
BF	7	Hanru Sirgel
OF	6	Werner Gouws	(substituted off) 51'
RL	5	Derik Pretorius
LL	4	Cameron Lindsay	(substituted off) 40'
TP	3	Janu Botha	(substituted off) 51'
HK	2	Janco Uys	(substituted off) 68'
LP	1	Kudzwai Dube	(substituted off) 51'
Substitutes:
HK	16	Simon Westraadt	(substituted on) 68'
PR	17	Edward Davids	(substituted on) 51'
PR	18	Andries Schutte	(substituted on) 51'
LK	19	Johan Retief	(substituted on) 40'
BR	20	Michael Amiras	(substituted on) 51'
SH	21	Johan Mulder	(substituted on) 40'
FH	22	Theo Boshoff	(substituted on) 51'
CE	23	Christopher Hollis
Coach:
Pieter Bergh

Pumas:
FB	15	Devon Williams
RW	14	Tapiwa Mafura
OC	13	Sebastian de Klerk	(substituted off) 77'
IC	12	Eddie Fouché	(substituted off) 69'
LW	11	Jade Stighling
FH	10	Tinus de Beer
SH	9	Chriswill September	(substituted off) 62'
N8	8	Andre Fouché
BF	7	Willie Engelbrecht (c)
OF	6	Daniel Maartens	(substituted off) 68'
RL	5	Shane Kirkwood	(substituted off) 68'
LL	4	Deon Slabbert
TP	3	Ig Prinsloo	(substituted off) 58'
HK	2	Eduan Swart	(substituted off) 58'
LP	1	Corné Fourie	(substituted off) 66'
Substitutes:
HK	16	Llewelyn Classen	(substituted on) 58'
PR	17	Dewald Maritz	(substituted on) 66'
PR	18	Simon Raw	(substituted on) 58'
BR	19	Kwanda Dimaza	(substituted on) 68'
BR	20	Francois Kleinhans	(substituted on) 68'
SH	21	Giovan Snyman	(substituted on) 62'
CE	22	Ali Mgijima	(substituted on) 69'
CE	23	Alwayno Visagie	(substituted on) 77'
Coach:
Jimmy Stonehouse

Assistant Referees:
Morné Ferreira
Griffin Colby
Television match official:
Quinton Immelman

== Players ==
=== Team rosters ===
The respective team squads for the 2022 Currie Cup Premier Division are:

Blue Bulls squad
Forwards
- Eric Basson
- Arno Botha
- Cyle Brink
- Marcell Coetzee
- Ruan Delport
- Cebo Dlamini
- Mhleli Dlamini
- Bismarck du Plessis
- Jacques du Plessis
- Schalk Erasmus
- Werner Gouws
- Lizo Gqoboka
- Johan Grobbelaar
- Cameron Hanekom
- Robert Hunt
- Francois Klopper
- Jaco Labuschagne
- Sebastian Lombard
- Elrigh Louw
- Reinhardt Ludwig
- Sintu Manjezi
- Simphiwe Matanzima
- Tielman Nieuwoudt
- Ruan Nortjé
- Willie Potgieter
- Raynard Roets
- Kowie Roos
- Stephan Smit
- Mornay Smith
- Gerhard Steenekamp
- Walt Steenkamp
- WJ Steenkamp
- Janko Swanepoel
- Sidney Tobias
- Muller Uys
- Jacques van Rooyen
- Joe van Zyl
- Ruan Vermaak
- Jan-Hendrik Wessels
Backs
- Diego Appollis
- Kurt-Lee Arendse
- Niel Beukes
- Zak Burger
- FC du Plessis
- Tiaan Fourie
- Stedman Gans
- Johan Goosen
- Cornal Hendricks
- Stravino Jacobs
- Marco Jansen van Vuren
- Keagan Johannes
- David Kriel
- Richard Kriel
- Tharquinn Manuel
- Lionel Mapoe
- Kabelo Mokoena
- Canan Moodie
- Juan Mostert
- Quewin Nortje
- Sibongile Novuka
- Embrose Papier
- Chris Smith
- Morné Steyn
- Madosh Tambwe
- Bernard van der Linde
- James Verity-Amm
- Harold Vorster
Coach
- Gert Smal

Free State Cheetahs squad
Forwards
- Wilmar Arnoldi
- Ockie Barnard
- Rynier Bernardo
- Aranos Coetzee
- Marné Coetzee
- George Cronjé
- Aidon Davis
- Dandrè Delport
- Cameron Dawson
- Schalk Ferreira
- Oupa Mohojé
- Sergio Moreira
- Mihlali Mosi
- Nqoba Mxoli
- Buhle Nojekwa
- Andisa Ntsila
- Jeandré Rudolph
- Victor Sekekete
- Alulutho Tshakweni
- Gideon van der Merwe
- Marnus van der Merwe
- Louis van der Westhuizen
- Conraad van Vuuren
- Janus Venter
- Reinier Viljoen
Backs
- Craig Barry
- Clayton Blommetjies
- Zenedine Booysen
- Evardi Boshoff
- Enver Brandt
- David Brits
- Branden de Kock
- Robert Ebersohn
- Reinhardt Fortuin
- Daniel Kasende
- Rewan Kruger
- Malcolm Jaer
- Cohen Jasper
- John Lourens
- Siya Masuku
- Howard Mnisi
- Juan-Dee Olivier
- Ruan Pienaar
- Duncan Saal
- Chris Smit
- Rosko Specman
- François Steyn
- Brandon Thomson
Coach
- Hawies Fourie

Golden Lions squad
Forwards
- Kabous Bezuidenhout
- PJ Botha
- Morné Brandon
- Ebot Buma
- Jarod Cairns
- Simon Dionisio
- Ruan Dreyer
- Jannie du Plessis
- Jacque-Louis du Toit
- Izan Esterhuizen
- Chergin Fillies
- Henk Gouws
- Francke Horn
- Pieter Jansen van Vuren
- Kayden Kiewit
- Banele Mthenjane
- Oupa Mthiyane
- Morgan Naudé
- Lunga Ncube
- Lindo Ncusane
- Sasko Ndlovu
- Reinhard Nothnagel
- Asenathi Ntlabakanye
- Darnell Osuagwu
- MJ Pelser
- Heiko Pohlman
- Carlü Sadie
- Sibusiso Sangweni
- Ruben Schoeman
- Sibusiso Shongwe
- Sti Sithole
- Okuhle Siyeni
- Cal Smid
- JP Smith
- Mark Snyman
- PJ Steenkamp
- Emmanuel Tshituka
- Vincent Tshituka
- Connor van Buuren
- Dameon Venter
- Ruan Venter
- Jaco Visagie
- Junior White
Backs
- Tyler Bocks
- Jurich Claasens
- Aidynn Cupido
- Boldwin Hansen
- Jordan Hendrikse
- Quan Horn
- Vaughen Isaacs
- Josh Jonas
- Gianni Lombard
- Rabz Maxwane
- James Mollentze
- Matt More
- Ilunga Mukendi
- Sanele Nohamba
- Burger Odendaal
- Stean Pienaar
- Mannie Rass
- Divan Rossouw
- Luke Rossouw
- Ngia Selengbe
- Wandisile Simelane
- Ginter Smuts
- Nico Steyn
- Zeilinga Strydom
- Tiaan Swanepoel
- James Tedder
- Morné van den Berg
- Edwill van der Merwe
- Henco van Wyk
- EW Viljoen
- André Warner
- Fred Zeilinga
Coach
- Mzwakhe Nkosi

Griquas squad
Forwards
- Michael Amiras
- Andrew Beerwinkel
- Janu Botha
- Luyolo Dapula
- Edward Davids
- Kudzwai Dube
- Gustav du Rand
- Carl Els
- Justin Forwood
- Werner Gouws
- Andrew Kuhn
- Jeandré Leonard
- Cameron Lindsay
- HJ Luus
- Niel Otto
- Derik Pretorius
- Sibabalo Qoma
- Johan Retief
- Andries Schutte
- Hanru Sirgel
- Ruan Steenkamp
- Janco Uys
- Tiaan van der Merwe
- Alandré van Rooyen
- Simon Westraadt
- Jaco Willemse
- Mzwanele Zito
Backs
- Masixole Banda
- Theo Boshoff
- Ashlon Davids
- Zander du Plessis
- Johnathan Francke
- Munier Hartzenberg
- Christopher Hollis
- Rynhardt Jonker
- Jan-Louis la Grange
- Johan Mulder
- Jay-Cee Nel
- Prince Nkabinde
- Nathan Nkutu
- Luther Obi
- Raegan Oranje
- André Swarts
- Stefan Ungerer
- George Whitehead
- Sango Xamlashe
Coach
- Pieter Bergh

Pumas squad
Forwards
- Tango Balekile
- Llewellyn Classen
- Kwanda Dimaza
- Willie Engelbrecht
- Andre Fouché
- Corné Fourie
- Njabulo Gumede
- Etienne Janeke
- Shane Kirkwood
- Francois Kleinhans
- Ruan Kramer
- Darrien Landsberg
- Anele Lungisa
- Daniel Maartens
- Khwezi Mafu
- Phumzile Maqondwana
- Dewald Maritz
- Malembe Mpofu
- Ig Prinsloo
- Simon Raw
- Deon Slabbert
- Eduan Swart
- Brandon Valentyn
- Boela Venter
Backs
- Diego Appollis
- Tiaan Botes
- Tinus de Beer
- Sebastian de Klerk
- Lucky Dlepu
- Eddie Fouché
- Herschelle Goodman
- Morné Joubert
- Japie Kleinhans
- Tapiwa Mafura
- Ali Mgijima
- Lundi Msenge
- Sihle Njezula
- Robbie Petzer
- Chriswill September
- Giovan Snyman
- Jade Stighling
- Etienne Taljaard
- Andries Viljoen
- Alwayno Visagie
- Devon Williams
Coach
- Jimmy Stonehouse

Sharks squad
Forwards
- Lourens Adriaanse
- Jason Alexander
- Hyron Andrews
- Thembelani Bholi
- Dian Bleuler
- Phepsi Buthelezi
- Thomas du Toit
- Ntsika Fisanti
- Keagan Glade
- Blaine Golden
- Gerbrandt Grobler
- Mpilo Gumede
- Nick Hatton
- Wiehahn Herbst
- Reniel Hugo
- Hanro Jacobs
- Dan Jooste
- Siya Kolisi
- Jeandre Labuschagne
- Jacques Marais
- Tinotenda Mavesere
- Fez Mbatha
- Bongi Mbonambi
- Khutha Mchunu
- Ntuthuko Mchunu
- Thabza Mdletshe
- Munashe Mhere
- Percy Mngadi
- Gopolang Molefe
- Khwezi Mona
- Josh Moon
- Ox Nché
- Siya Ningiza
- Olajuwon Noah
- Sikhumbuzo Notshe
- Corne Rahl
- Braam Reyneke
- Dylan Richardson
- Le Roux Roets
- Kyle Theron
- Emile van Heerden
- Ruben van Heerden
- George van Niekerk
- Kerron van Vuuren
- Ian van Wyk
- Henco Venter
- James Venter
- Ntokozo Vidima
Backs
- Thaakir Abrahams
- Lukhanyo Am
- Curwin Bosch
- Jordan Chait
- Boeta Chamberlain
- Bradley Davids
- Joaquín Díaz Bonilla
- Caleb Dingaan
- Christian Els
- Aphelele Fassi
- Ethan Fisher
- Nevaldo Fleurs
- Jaden Hendrikse
- Gerado Jaars
- Onke Jiba
- Eduan Keyter
- Werner Kok
- Lloyd Koster
- Murray Koster
- Duran Krummeck
- Marius Louw
- Seun Maduna
- Makazole Mapimpi
- Josh Miller
- Zee Mkhabela
- Sbu Nkosi
- Sanele Nohamba
- Daimon O'Connell
- Yaw Penxe
- Marnus Potgieter
- Inny Radebe
- Jean Smith
- Anthony Volmink
- Jeremy Ward
- Grant Williams
- Cameron Wright
- Sivi Zondani
Coach
- Etienne Fynn

Western Province squad
Forwards
- Keagen Blanckenberg
- Kwenzo Blose
- Mitchell Carstens
- Hacjivah Dayimani
- Dylan de Leeuw
- Ben-Jason Dixon
- Connor Evans
- Neethling Fouché
- Deon Fourie
- Jacques Goosen
- Hannes Gous
- JJ Kotze
- Christian Lamprecht
- Ruan Laubscher
- Hilton Lobberts
- Leon Lyons
- Lee-Marvin Mazibuko
- David Meihuizen
- Simon Miller
- Keke Morabe
- Siya Ngubelanga
- Romeo Ntumba
- Shaine Orderson
- Junior Pokomela
- Sazi Sandi
- Roelof Smit
- Adré Smith
- Chad Solomon
- Jarrod Taylor
- Marcel Theunissen
- Ernst van Rhyn
- HP van Schoor
- Jacques van Zyl
- Andre-Hugo Venter
- Ali Vermaak
- Lukhanyo Vokozela
- Corné Weilbach
- Nama Xaba
Backs
- Bobby Alexander
- Thomas Bursey
- Angelo Davids
- Juan de Jongh
- Ricardo Duarttee
- Paschal Ekeji
- Ethan James
- Tristan Leyds
- André Manuel
- Godlen Masimla
- Mambo Mkhize
- Sacha Mngomezulu
- Sergeal Petersen
- Rikus Pretorius
- Jonathan Roche
- Seabelo Senatla
- Chris Schreuder
- Cornel Smit
- Tim Swiel
- Ebenezer Tshimanga
- Mario Wilson
- Kade Wolhuter
- Leolin Zas
- Mnombo Zwelendaba
Coach
- Jerome Paarwater

== Referees ==
The following referees officiated matches in the competition:

2022 Currie Cup Premier Division referees
- Aimee Barrett-Theron
- Griffin Colby
- Morné Ferreira
- Stephan Geldenhuys
- AJ Jacobs
- Cwengile Jadezweni
- Paul Mente
- Jaco Peyper
- Rasta Rasivhenge
- Marius van der Westhuizen

== Champions Match ==
2 July 2022
19:00

Carling Champions team (South Africa)	31–27	Italy A
Try: Daniel Kasende; Siya Masuku; Keagan Johannes; Nama Xaba; Dan Jooste; Con: Siya Masuku (3)	Report	Try: Gesi Simone; Cannone Lorenzo; Di Bartolomeo Tommaso; Con: Carna Carlo (3); Pen: Carna Carlo (2)

Nelson Mandela Bay Stadium, Gqeberha

== See also ==
- 2022 Currie Cup First Division
