= 2024–25 Lions (United Rugby Championship) season =

Lions
- Union: South African Rugby Union
- Emblem: Lion
- Founded: 1889 (Transvaal Rugby Union); 1996 (Lions franchise)
- Location: Johannesburg, South Africa
- Ground: Emirates Airline Park (Capacity: 62,567)
- Coach: Ivan van Rooyen
- Captain: Marius Louw
- League: United Rugby Championship
1st kit	2nd kit	3rd kit

Official website
- lionsrugby.co.za

The 2024–25 season is the Lions' fourth season in the United Rugby Championship, their 29th season of professional rugby and their 135th season of representative rugby since the foundation of their provincial union, the Transvaal Rugby Union. Along with competing in the URC and its South African Shield competition, the club will also participate in the 2024-25 European Rugby Challenge Cup.

== Senior squad ==
The Lions squad for the 2024–25 United Rugby Championship is.

Lions United Rugby Championship squad
**Props**: (South Africa) Morgan Naudé; (South Africa) Asenathi Ntlabakanye; (South Africa) Heiko Pohlmann; (South Africa) Juan Schoeman; (South Africa) JP Smith; (South Africa) Conraad van Vuuren; **Hookers**: (South Africa) PJ Botha; (South Africa) Morné Brandon; (South Africa) Jacque-Louis du Toit; (South Africa) Franco Marais; (South Africa) Jaco Visagie; **Locks**: (South Africa) Ruan Delport; (Zimbabwe) Darrien Landsberg; (South Africa) Etienne Oosthuizen; (South Africa) Reinhard Nothnagel; (South Africa) Siba Qoma; (South Africa) Raynard Roets; (South Africa) Ruben Schoeman; (South Africa) **Ruan Venter**	**Loose forwards**: (South Africa) Jarod Cairns; (South Africa) Renzo du Plessis; (South Africa) Izan Esterhuizen; (South Africa) Francke Horn; (South Africa) JC Pretorius; (South Africa) WJ Steenkamp; (South Africa) Ruhan Straeuli; **Scrum-halves**: (South Africa) Johan Mulder; (South Africa) Sanele Nohamba; (South Africa) Nico Steyn; (South Africa) **Morné van den Berg**; **Fly-halves**: (South Africa) Gianni Lombard; (South Africa) Kade Wolhuter	**Centres**: (South Africa) Erich Cronjé; (South Africa) Zander du Plessis; (South Africa) Rynhardt Jonker; (South Africa) Marius Louw (c); (South Africa) Mannie Rass; (South Africa) Henco van Wyk; **Wingers**: (South Africa) Boldwin Hansen; (South Africa) Richard Kriel; (South Africa) Rabz Maxwane; (South Africa) **Edwill van der Merwe**; **Fullbacks**: (South Africa) **Quan Horn**; (Zimbabwe) **Tapiwa Mafura**
(c) Denotes team captain, **Bold** denotes internationally capped, ^{ST} denotes a short-term signing.

== United Rugby Championship ==
=== Main URC standings ===
Pos	Team	Pld	W	D	L	PF	PA	PD	TF	TA	TB	LB	Pts	Qualification
1	Leinster (CH)	18	16	0	2	542	256	+286	79	35	11	1	76	Qualifies for home URC quarter-final; Qualification for the 2025–26 Champions Cup
2	Bulls (RU)	18	14	0	4	542	361	+181	71	44	9	3	68	Qualifies for home URC quarter-final; Qualification for the 2025–26 Champions Cup
3	Sharks	18	13	0	5	436	402	+34	55	59	7	3	62	Qualifies for home URC quarter-final; Qualification for the 2025–26 Champions Cup
4	Glasgow Warriors	18	11	0	7	468	327	+141	70	40	10	5	59	Qualifies for home URC quarter-final; Qualification for the 2025–26 Champions Cup
5	Stormers	18	10	0	8	507	418	+89	66	57	11	4	55	Qualifies for URC quarter-final; Qualification for the 2025–26 Champions Cup
6	Munster	18	9	0	9	444	429	+15	67	59	11	4	51	Qualifies for URC quarter-final; Qualification for the 2025–26 Champions Cup
7	Edinburgh	18	8	1	9	471	407	+64	66	57	9	6	49	Qualifies for URC quarter-final; Qualification for the 2025–26 Champions Cup
8	Scarlets	18	9	1	8	427	382	+45	50	52	6	4	48	Qualifies for URC quarter-final; Qualification for the 2025–26 Champions Cup
9	Cardiff	18	8	1	9	409	477	−68	63	65	10	3	47	Qualification for the 2025–26 Challenge Cup
10	Benetton	18	9	1	8	393	478	−85	50	65	7	1	46	Qualification for the 2025–26 Challenge Cup
11	Lions	18	8	0	10	402	440	−38	53	60	5	3	40	Qualification for the 2025–26 Challenge Cup
12	Ospreys	18	7	1	10	437	454	−17	60	63	6	4	40	Qualification for the 2025–26 Challenge Cup
13	Connacht	18	6	0	12	420	472	−52	64	62	9	6	39	Qualification for the 2025–26 Challenge Cup
14	Ulster	18	7	0	11	414	506	−92	59	72	5	5	38	Qualification for the 2025–26 Challenge Cup
15	Zebre Parma	18	5	1	12	302	503	−201	38	72	3	4	29	Qualification for the 2025–26 Challenge Cup
16	Dragons	18	1	0	17	335	637	−302	43	92	1	4	9	Qualification for the 2025–26 Challenge Cup

Source: UnitedRugby.com
Rules for classification: Tiebreakers for teams tied on points: 1) Number of matches won 2) The difference between points for and points against 3) The number of tries scored 4) The most points scored 5) The difference between tries for and tries against 6) The fewest red cards received 7) The fewest yellow cards received.

==== Round 1 ====
8 Match 2025 (rearranged)	(1 BP) Sharks (South Africa)	25–22	(South Africa) Lions	Hollywoodbets Kings Park
	Try: Williams; Kolisi (2); Hatton; Con: Hendrikse; Pen: Hendrikse	Report	Try: Mafura; Kriel; Marais; Con: Lombard (2); Pen: Lombard	Attendance: 15,165

==== Round 2 ====
28 September 2024
12:55

(1 BP) Lions (South Africa)	35–22	(Ireland) Ulster (1 BP)
Try: Maxwane 10' m F. Horn 34' c Marais 46' m van Wyk 49' c Wolhuter 79' m Con: Wolhuter (2/4) 35', 51'; Pen: Wolhuter (2/2) 14', 57'		Try: Cooney 40+3' m Morgan 42' m Kok 59' m Barrett 77' c Con: Doak (1/2) 78'

Ellis Park Stadium, Johannesburg
Attendance: 2,194
Referee: Sam Grove-White (Scotland)

==== Round 3 ====
5 October 2024
13:45

(1 BP) Lions (South Africa)	55–21	(Scotland) Edinburgh
Try: Q. Horn 5' m Maxwane (3) 12' c, 31' c, 71' c van der Merwe (2) 20' c, 39' c Jonker 26' c F. Horn 35' m Con: Wolhuter (4/5) 13', 21', 27', 31'; Nohamba (2/3) 40', 73'; Pen: Wolhuter (1/1) 2'		Try: Gilchrist 44' c Harrison 50' c Muncaster 66' c Con: Healy (2/2) 44', 51'; Ross Thompson (1/1) 67'

Ellis Park Stadium, Johannesburg
Attendance: 3,542
Referee: Adam Jones (Wales)

==== Round 4 ====
13 October 2024
14:30

(1 BP) Dragons (Wales)	19–23	(South Africa) Lions
Try: Keddie 14' c Basham (2) 24' m, 42' c Con: Evans (2/3) 15', 43'		Try: Q. Horn 10' c Cairns 51' c Con: Steyn (1/1) 11'; Nohamba (1/1) 52'; Pen: Steyn (2/2) 28', 40+1'; Nohamba (1/1) 49'

Rodney Parade, Newport
Attendance: 4 237
Referee: Fillipo Russo (Italy)

==== Round 5 ====
19 October 2024
13:30

(1 BP) Zebre Parma (Italy)	9–10	(South Africa) Lions
Try: Montemauri (3/4) 14', 21', 46'		Try: van der Merwe 27' c Con: Nohamba (1/1) 28'; Pen: Nohamba (1/2) 42'

Stadio Sergio Lanfranchi, Parma
Attendance: 1,187
Referee: Ben Connor, Wales

==== Round 6 ====
26 October 2024
17:15

Leinster (Ireland)	24–6	(South Africa) Lions
Try: van der Flier 31' c Doris 57' c Penalty try 80'+1; Con: Prendergast (2/2) 32', 58'; Pen: Prendergast 2'		Pen: Wolhuter (2) 12', 17'

Aviva Stadium, Dublin
Attendance: 20,945
Referee: Craig Evans, Wales

==== Round 7 ====
30 November 2024
19:35

Munster (Ireland)	17–10	(South Africa) Lions (1 BP)
Try: Abrahams 15' c S. Daly 42' m Kendellen 53' m Con: Burns (1/3) 16'		Try: van Wyk 27' c Con: Wolhuter (1/1) 28'; Pen: Wolhuter 32'

Thomond Park, Limerick
Attendance: 11,836
Referee: Adam Jones (Wales)

==== Round 8 ====
21 December 2024
15:45

(1 BP) Stormers (South Africa)	29–10	(South Africa) Lions
Try: Dweba 12' m Hartzenberg 24' m Dweba 33' m Zas 47' c Fouché 75' c Con: Libbok (2/5) 48', 76'	Report	Try: van der Merwe 43' m Marais 63' m

Cape Town Stadium, Cape Town
Attendance: 22,410

==== Round 9 ====
22 February 2025
14:00

Bulls (South Africa)	31-19	(South Africa) Lions

Loftus Versfeld Stadium, Pretoria
Attendance: 17,501

==== Round 10 ====
25 January 2025
14:45

Lions (South Africa)	22–35	(South Africa) Bulls
Try: van Wyk 33' m Oosthuizen 61' m Pen: Francis (4) 19', 28', 46', 52'		Try: Kriel 15' c Wiese 54' c Coetzee 65' c van der Merwe 69' m Con: Chamberlain 15'; Kriel (2/3) 54', 66'; Pen: Chamberlain (2) 9', 50'; Kriel 58'

Ellis Park Stadium, Johannesburg
Attendance: 19 881
Referee: Marius van der Westhuizen

==== Round 11 ====
15 February 2025	Lions (South Africa)	30–23	(South Africa) Stormers (1 BP)	Ellis Park Stadium, Johannesburg
14:30	Try: van den Berg 19' c van Wyk 22' c Louw 34' c Con: Lombard (3/3) 20', 23', 35'; Pen: Lombard (3/3) 14', 47', 59'	Report	Try: Gelant 44'c Roos 69'c Con: Matthee (2/2) 45', 70'; Pen: Matthee (3/3) 17', 31', 81'

==== Round 12 ====
1 March 2025	(1 BP) Lions (South Africa)	38–14	(South Africa) Sharks	Ellis Park Stadium, Johannesburg
14:30	Try: Botha 6' c F. Horn 14' c van der Merwe 37' m Kriel 41' m Cairns 59' c Lombard 70' c Con: Lombard (3/5) 7', 15', 60'; Steyn (1/1) 71'	Report	Try: Hooker 77' c Kolisi 80' c Con: Jo. Hendrikse (2/2) 78', 80'	Attendance: 11,542

==== Round 13 ====
21 March 2025	Cardiff (Wales)	20 – 17	(South Africa) Lions (1 BP)	Cardiff Arms Park, Cardiff
19:35	Try: Donnell, 20'c Millard, 63'c Con: Sheedy (2); Pen: Sheedy, 31', 50'	Report	Try: Ntlabakanye, 11'c Horn, 57'c Con: Lombard (2); Pen: Lombard, 44'	Attendance: 6,235; Referee: (Italy) Federico Vedovelli

==== Round 14 ====
29 March 2025	(1 BP) Glasgow Warriors (Scotland)	42 - 0	(South Africa) Lions	Scotstoun Stadium, Glasgow
19:35	Try: McBeth, 6'; Dobie, 18', 26'; Horne, 30'; Hastings, 38'; Stewart, 44'; Con: Hasting, 7', 19', 27', 31', 39', 44'	Report:ESPN		Attendance: 6,629

==== Round 15 ====
19 April 2025	(1 BP) Lions (South Africa)	31 - 42	(Italy) Benetton (1 BP)	Ellis Park Stadium, Johannesburg
13:45	Try: Venter, 27'; Louw, 41'; E. v.d. Merwe, 61'; Prestorius, 77'; Con: Wolhuter, 28', 42', 62', 77'; Pen: Wolhuter, 6'	Report	Try: Umaga, 7'; Mendy, 13', 38'; Marin, 23'; Ruzza, 44'; Con: Umaga, 8', 24', 39', 44'; Pen: Umaga, 18', 35', 65'	Attendance: not given Referee: Craig Evans

==== Round 16 ====
26 April 2025	Lions (South Africa)	26 – 7	(Ireland) Connacht	Ellis Park Stadium, Johannesburg
16:00	Try: du Plessis, 14'; Pretorius, 70' v.d. Merwe, 83'; Con: Dobela, 84; Pen: Wolhuter, 19', 37', 43'	Report, 2	Try: de Buitlear, 74'; Con: Hawkshaw, 74	Attendance: 3,454; Referee: Hollie Davidson

==== Round 17 ====
11 May 2025	Lions (South Africa)	19–32	(Wales) Scarlets (1 BP)	Ellis Park Stadium, Johannesburg
15:00				Attendance: 2,522

==== Round 18 ====
17 May 2025	(1 BP) Lions (South Africa)	29–28	(Wales) Ospreys (2 BP)	Ellis Park Stadium, Johannesburg
17:15	Try: Van der Merwe 10'; Visagie 31', 54'; Van Wyk 71'; Dobela 82'; Con: Dobela, 32', 72'	Report	Try: Griffiths 11'; Ratti 52'; Walsh 62'; Parry 78'; Con: Edwards 12', 53', 63', 79'	Attendance: 3,494

Lions have been eliminated from the Championship.

== URC South African Shield ==
2024–25 United Rugby Championship Regional Shield Pools
(South Africa) South African Shield
	Team	P	W	D	L	PF	PA	PD	TF	TA	TBP	LBP	Pts	Pos overall
1	(South Africa) Sharks (S)	6	4	0	2	129	135	−6	17	20	2	1	19	3
2	(South Africa) Stormers	6	3	0	3	142	130	+12	19	15	3	3	18	5
3	(South Africa) Bulls	6	3	0	3	151	141	+10	19	17	3	2	17	2
4	(South Africa) Lions	6	2	0	4	141	157	−16	19	22	1	1	10	11
If teams are level at any stage, tiebreakers are applied in the following order: 1. number of matches won 2. the difference between points for and points against 3. the number of tries scored 4. the most points scored 5. the difference between tries for and tries against 6. the fewest red cards received 7. the fewest yellow cards received
Green background indicates teams currently leading the regional shield. Upon the conclusion of the regular season, these teams win their respective regional shields. (S) : URC Shield champion

== European Challenge Cup ==
=== Pool table ===
EPCR Challenge Cup Pool 2
Pos	Team	Pld	W	D	L	PF	PA	PD	TF	TA	TB	LB	Pts	Qualification
1	(France) Montpellier (2)	4	4	0	0	131	41	+90	19	6	3	0	19	Home round of 16
2	(Wales) Ospreys (4)	4	3	0	1	111	116	−5	16	17	3	0	15	Home round of 16
3	(France) Pau (7)	4	2	0	2	119	108	+11	10	10	3	1	12	Home round of 16
4	(South Africa) Lions (14)	4	2	0	2	122	103	+19	18	13	2	0	10	Away round of 16
5	(Wales) Dragons	4	1	0	3	61	116	−55	8	15	0	1	5	
6	(England) Newcastle Falcons	4	0	0	4	55	115	−60	8	16	0	0	0	

Source: EPCR
Rules for classification: Tiebreakers for teams tied on points: 1) Number of matches won; 2) Difference between points for and against; 3) Total number of points for; 4) Aggregate number of points scored in matches between tied teams; 5) Number of matches won excluding the first match, then the second and so on until the tie is settled.

=== Pool matches ===
==== Round 1 ====
8 December 2024	(1 BP) Ospreys (Wales)	30–14	(South Africa) Lions	Parc y Scarlets, Llanelli (Note: The match between Ospreys and Lions was relocated to Parc y Scarlets, due to structural damages at the Swansea.com Stadium caused by Storm Darragh.)
15:15	Try: Morgan 27' c Giles 44' m Hardy 47' c Edwards 78' m Con: O. Williams (2/4) 28', 48'; Pen: O. Williams (2/2) 21', 35'	Report	Try: Marais 10' c Cronjé 75' c Con: Francis (1/1) 11'; Nohamba (1/1) 76'	Attendance: 2,877; Referee: Kevin Bralley (France)

==== Round 2 ====
14 December 2024	(1 BP) Lions (South Africa)	43–35	(France) Pau (1 BP)	Emirates Airline Park, Johannesburg
17:15	Try: van der Merwe 12' c van den Berg 20' c Botha 40' m Penalty try 49'; J. Schoeman 53' c R. Schoeman 61' c Con: Wolhuter (4/5) 13', 21', 54', 62'; Pen: Wolhuter (1/1) 70'	Report	Try: Jooste 9' c Desperes 44' c Ruffenach 63' m Bouhier 75' c Con: Desperes (3/4) 10', 45', 76'; Pen: Desperes (3/3) 16', 24', 38'	Attendance: 2,042; Referee: Anthony Woodthorpe (England)

==== Round 3 ====
11 January 2025	(1 BP) Montpellier (France)	28–5	(South Africa) Lions	GGL Stadium, Montpellier
18:30	Try: Tauleigne 2' c Bernadet (2) 53' c, 60' c Simmonds 71' c Con: Vincent (3/3) 3', 55', 61'; Barreau (1/1) 72'	Report	Try: Horn 46' m	Attendance: 7,500; Referee: Ben Breakspear (Wales)

==== Round 4 ====
18 January 2025	(1 BP) Lions (South Africa)	60–10	(Wales) Dragons	Emirates Airline Park, Johannesburg
17:15	Try: Horn (2) 8' c, 48' m Francis 15' c Venter (2) 22' c, 65' c Mafura 26' c Lombard 56' m Visagie 61' m Rass 80' c Con: Francis (4/4) 9', 16', 23', 27'; Lombard (2/5) 66', 80'; Pen: Francis (1/1) 3'	Report	Try: Latu 53' c Con: Reed (1/1) 54'; Pen: Reed (1/2) 7'	Attendance: 2,562; Referee: Evan Urruzmendi (France)

=== Knockout rounds ===
Round of 16
3	(Scotland) Edinburgh	24
14	(South Africa) Lions	12
6	(France) Bayonne	22
11	(South Africa) Bulls	32
7	(France) Pau	24
10	(England) Bath Rugby	49
2	(France) Montpellier	17
15	(England) Gloucester	24
4	(Wales) Ospreys	36
13	(Wales) Scarlets	14
5	(France) Lyon	34
12	(South Africa) Sharks	21
1	(Ireland) Connacht	35
16	(Wales) Cardiff	20
8	(France) Perpignan	18
9	(France) Racing 92	24

Quarter-finals
3	(Scotland) Edinburgh	34
11	(South Africa) Bulls	28
10	(England) Bath Rugby	61
15	(England) Gloucester	26
4	(Wales) Ospreys	18
5	(France) Lyon	20
1	(Ireland) Connacht	40
9	(France) Racing 92	43

Semi-finals
3	(Scotland) Edinburgh	24
10	(England) Bath Rugby	39
5	(France) Lyon	29
9	(France) Racing 92	15

Final
10	(England) Bath Rugby	37
5	(France) Lyon	12

==== Round of 16 ====
Lions finished fourth in their group, and were awarded the fourteenth seeding for the knockout rounds. In the Round of 16 they were drawn away to Edinburgh. The Lions had resoundingly beaten the Scottish team at home earlier in the United Rugby Championship. In the tie, Edinburgh returned the favour, eliminating the Lions from the competition.

4 April 2025
20:00

Edinburgh (Scotland) (3)	24 - 12	(14) (South Africa) Lions
Try: Goosen, 1’ Vellacott, 9’ Ritchie, 28’c Price, 71’c Con: Thompson, 29', 72'	Report:EPRC	Try: Horn 46’ Visagie, 75’c Con: Steyn, 76'

Edinburgh Rugby Stadium, Edinburgh
Attendance: 5,407
Referee: Ludovic Cayre (France)

== Home attendance ==
As of 14 February 2025

Domestic League						European Champions Cup						Total	
League	Fixtures	Total Attendance	Average Attendance	Highest	Lowest	League	Fixtures	Total Attendance	Average Attendance	Highest	Lowest	Total Attendance	Average Attendance
2024–25 United Rugby Championship	9	60,288	6,699	19,981	2,194	2024–25 European Rugby Champions Cup	2	4,604	2,302	2,562	2,042	64,892	5,899
