= 2021 Varsity Cup =

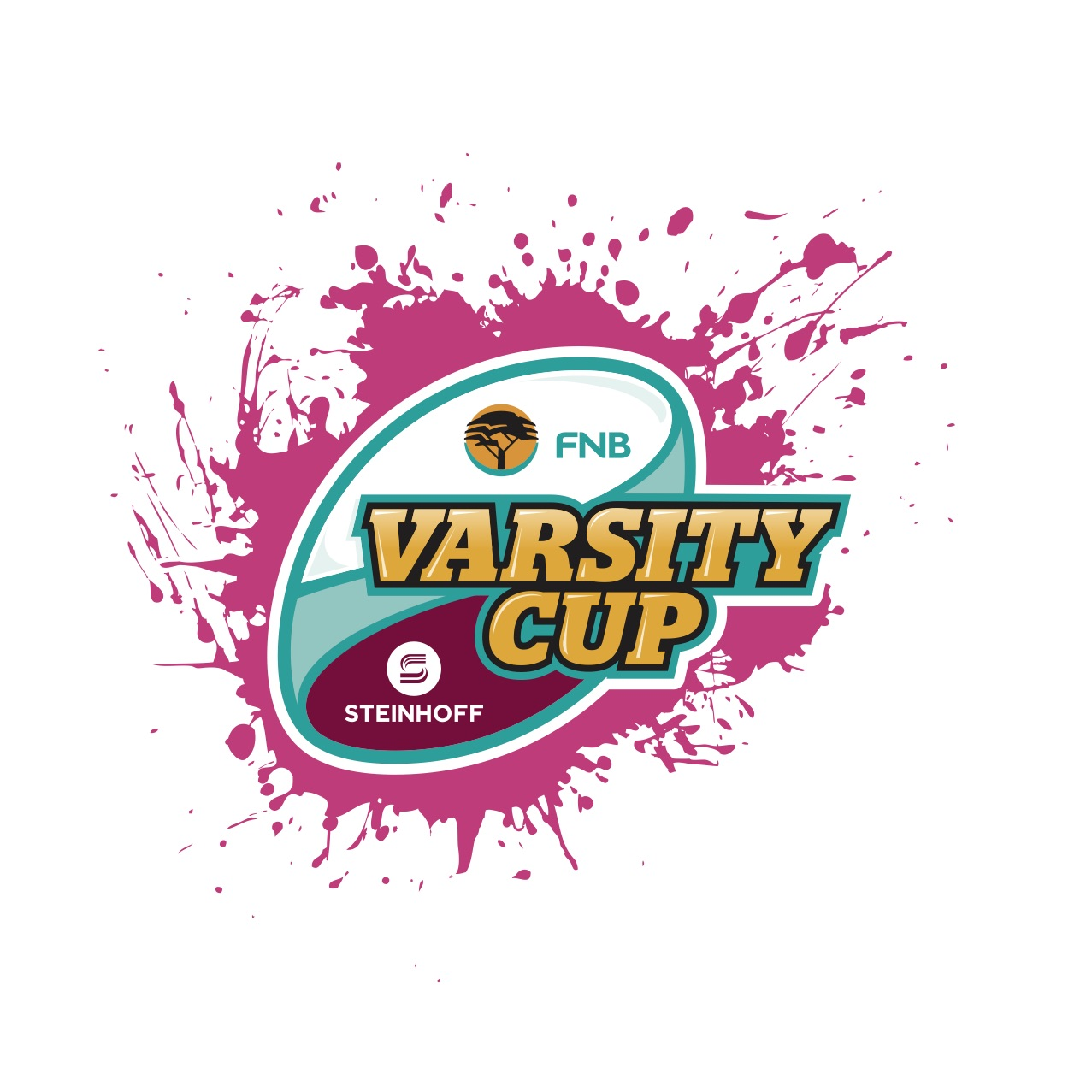
- Countries: South Africa
- Date: 4 May – 31 April 2021
- Champions: UP Tuks (4th title)
- Runners-up: UCT Ikey Tigers
- Matches played: 93
- Top point scorer: Zander du Plessis (136 - UP Tuks)
- Top try scorer: Janus Venter (12 - CUT)

The 2021 Varsity Cup was the 14th season of the Varsity Cup, the top competition in the annual Varsity Rugby series. It was played between 4 February and 31 May 2021 and featured ten university teams.

NMU Madibaz won promotion from the Varsity Shield in 2019.

== Competition rules and information ==
There were ten participating university teams in the 2021 Varsity Cup. They played each other once during the pool stage, either at home or away. Teams received four points for a win and two points for a draw. Bonus points were awarded to teams that scored four or more tries in a game, as well as to teams that lost a match by seven points or less. Teams were ranked by log points, then points difference (points scored less points conceded).

The top four teams after the pool stage qualified for the semifinals, which were followed by a final.

This tournaments will take place in a secure COVID-19 bio-bubble called the FNB Varsity Cup Village, matches will be played at Tuks Stadium, the Tuks B-Field and Loftus Versfeld Stadium.

== Teams ==
Location of teams in the 2021 Varsity Cup
Western Cape

The teams that played in the 2021 Varsity Cup are:

2021 Varsity Cup teams
Team name	University
CUT Ixias	Central University of Technology
Maties	Stellenbosch University
NMU Madibaz	Nelson Mandela University
NWU Eagles	North-West University
UCT Ikey Tigers	University of Cape Town
UFS Shimlas	University of the Free State
UJ	University of Johannesburg
UP Tuks	University of Pretoria
UWC	University of the Western Cape
Wits	University of the Witwatersrand

== Pool stage ==
=== Standings ===
The final log for the 2021 Varsity Cup was:

2021 Varsity Cup log
Pos	Team	P	W	D	L	PF	PA	PD	TF	TA	TB	LB	BP	Pts
1	UCT Ikey Tigers	9	8	1	0			174					7	41
2	Maties	9	7	0	2			160					7	35
3	UP Tuks	9	6	1	2			145					8	34
4	NWU Eagles	9	6	0	3			13					6	30
5	CUT Ixias	9	6	0	3			-25					5	29
6	UWC	9	3	1	5			0					6	20
7	UFS Shimlas	9	2	1	6			-119					8	18
8	Wits	9	3	0	6			37					5	17
9	UJ	9	2	0	7			-120					7	15
10	NMU Madibaz	9	0	0	9			-265					5	5
Correct as at 31 May 2021.

Legend and competition rules
Legend:
Qualified for the semifinals.	P = Games played, W = Games won, D = Games drawn, L = Games lost, PF = Points for, PA = Points against, PD = Points difference, TF = Tries for, TA = Tries against, TB = Try bonus points, LB = Losing bonus points, Pts = Log points
Competition rules:
Qualification: The top four teams qualified for the semifinals. Points breakdown: * 4 points for a win * 2 points for a draw * 1 bonus point for a loss by seven points or less * 1 bonus point for scoring four or more tries in a match

=== Matches ===
The following matches were played in the 2021 Varsity Cup:

== Play-offs ==
Semi-finals
28 May - Tuks Rugby Stadium
UCT Ikey Tigers	54
NWU Eagles	36
28 May – Tuks Rugby Stadium
Maties	34
UP Tuks	44

Final
31 May – Tuks Rugby Stadium
UCT Ikey Tigers	27
UP Tuks	34

=== Semi-finals ===
28 May 2019
17:00

Maties	35–44	UP Tuks
	Report

Tuks Stadium
Referee: Stephan Geldenhuys

28 May 2019
19:00

UCT Ikey Tigers	54–36	NWU Eagles
	Report

Tuks Stadium
Referee: Griffon Colby

=== Final ===
31 May 2021
19:00

UCT Ikey Tigers	27–34	UP Tuks
Try: Hunt 13'; Cranswick 43'; Gazi 70', 80'; Con: Tedder 14'; Hayes 44'; Pen: Tedder 19'	Report	Try: Dlamini 5'; Xamlashe 14'; Janeke 35'; Sirgel 41-1'; Con: du Plessis 6', 36', 41-2'; Pen: du Plessis 33', 77'

Tuks Stadium
Referee: Morne Ferreira

UCT	Tuks

FB	15	Athi Gazi
RW	14	Rihaz Fredericks
OC	13	Evardi Boshoff
IC	12	Le Roux Malan
LW	11	Rethabile Louw
FH	10	James Tedder
SH	9	William Rose
N8	8	Christian Stehlik
OF	7	Niel Otto
BF	6	Liam Greenhalgh (c)
RL	5	Gary Porter
LL	4	Byron Cranswick
TP	3	Robert Hunt
HK	2	Devon Arendse
LP	1	Luthando Woji
Replacements:
	16	Josh van Vuuren
	17	Seth Christian
	18	Ashwyn Adams
	19	Byron Bowes
	20	Taariq Kruger
	21	Kyle Bowman
	22	David Hayes
	23	Duran Koevort
Coach:
Christie Grobbelaar

FB	15	Zander du Plessis
RW	14	Stefan Coetzee
OC	13	Sango Xamlashe (c)
IC	12	Louritz van der Schyff
LW	11	Ambesa Zenzeli
FH	10	David Coetzer
SH	9	Clyde Lewis
N8	8	Jaco Bezuidenhout
OF	7	Hanru Sirge
BF	6	Eduan Lubbe
RL	5	Thomas Meyer
LL	4	Mihlali Stamper
TP	3	Damien Swartz
HK	2	Werner Fourie
LP	1	Cebo Dlamini
Replacements:
	16	Llewellyn Classen
	17	Dewald Donald
	18	Etienne Janeke
	19	Orateng Koikanyang
	20	Stephan Smit
	21	Johan Mulder
	22	Enrique Oranje
	23	Tharquin Manuel
Coach:
Nicolas Mynhardt

Player of the Match:
Etienne Janeke UP Tuks

== Honours ==
The honour roll for the 2021 Varsity Cup was as follows:

2021 Varsity Cup Honours
Champions:	UP Tuks (4th title)
Player That Rocks:	Cohen Jasper, CUT Ixias
Forward That Rocks:	Tinotenda Mavesere, UWC
Back That Rocks:	Munier Hartzenberg, Maties
Top Points Scorer:	Zander du Plessis, UP Tuks (136)
Top Try Scorer:	Janus Venter, CUT Ixias (12)
