= 2022 Varsity Cup =

South African college rugby competition

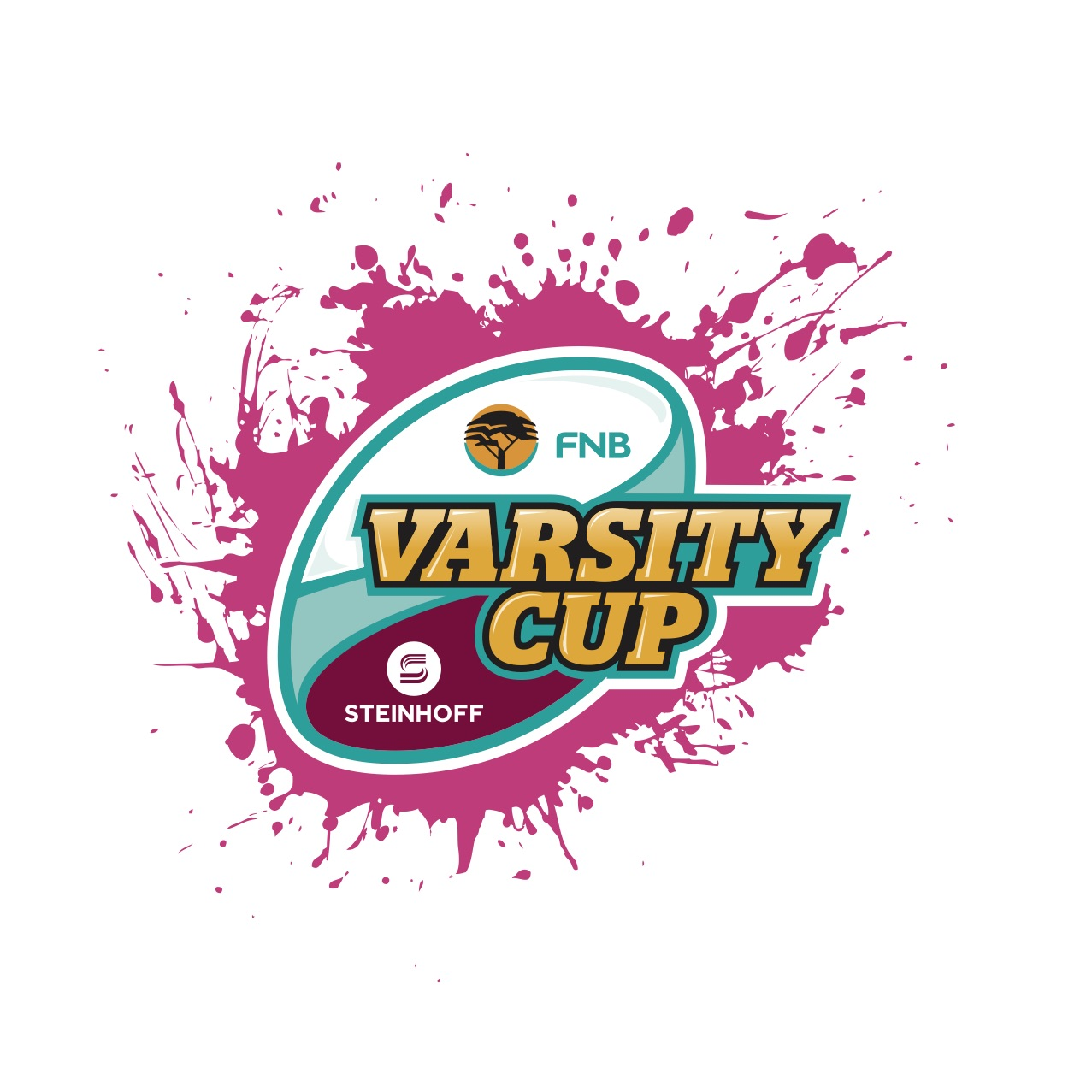
- Countries: South Africa
- Date: 14 February – 25 April 2022
- Champions: UP Tuks (5th title)
- Runners-up: Maties
- Relegated: UWC, NMU Madibaz
- Top point scorer: Zander Du Plessis (159 - UP Tuks)
- Top try scorer: Sean Swart (12 - Maties)

The 2022 Varsity Cup was the 15th season of the Varsity Cup, the top competition in the annual Varsity Rugby series. It was played between 14 February and 25 April 2022 and featured ten university teams.

== Competition rules and information ==
There were ten participating university teams in the 2022 Varsity Cup. They played each other once during the pool stage, either at home or away. Teams received four points for a win and two points for a draw. Bonus points were awarded to teams that scored four or more tries in a game, as well as to teams that lost a match by seven points or less. Teams were ranked by log points, then points difference (points scored less points conceded).

The top four teams after the pool stage qualified for the semifinals, which were followed by a final.

== Teams ==
Location of teams in the 2022 Varsity Cup
Western Cape

The teams that played in the 2022 Varsity Cup are:

2022 Varsity Cup teams
Team name	University	Stadium
CUT Ixias	Central University of Technology	CUT Stadium, Bloemfontein
Maties	Stellenbosch University	Danie Craven Stadium, Stellenbosch
NMU Madibaz	Nelson Mandela University	NMU Stadium, Port Elizabeth
NWU Eagles	North-West University	Fanie du Toit Sport Ground, Potchefstroom
UCT Ikey Tigers	University of Cape Town	UCT Rugby Fields, Cape Town
UFS Shimlas	University of the Free State	Shimla Park, Bloemfontein
UJ	University of Johannesburg	UJ Stadium, Johannesburg
UP Tuks	University of Pretoria	LC de Villiers Stadium, Pretoria
UWC	University of the Western Cape	UWC Sport Stadium, Cape Town
Wits	University of the Witwatersrand	Wits Rugby Stadium, Johannesburg

== Pool stage ==
=== Standings ===
The final log for the 2022 Varsity Cup was:

2022 Varsity Cup log
Pos	Team	P	W	D	L	PF	PA	PD	TF	TA	TB	LB	BP	Pts
1	UFS Shimlas	9	7	0	2	400	228	+172			9	0	9	37
2	UCT Ikey Tigers	9	7	0	2	307	270	+37			8	0	8	36
3	Maties	9	7	0	2	324	232	+92			6	0	6	34
4	UP Tuks	9	6	0	3	279	172	+107			6	0	6	30
5	NWU Eagles	9	6	0	3	266	182	+84			5	0	5	29
6	UJ	9	4	1	4	287	258	+29			4	2	6	24
7	Wits	9	4	0	5	239	262	-25			3	1	4	20
8	UWC	9	2	0	7	255	403	-148			5	0	5	13
9	NMU Madibaz	9	1	0	8	194	389	-195			4	1	5	9
10	CUT Ixias	9	0	1	8	219	372	-153			4	2	6	8

Legend and competition rules
Legend:
Qualified for the semifinals.	P = Games played, W = Games won, D = Games drawn, L = Games lost, PF = Points for, PA = Points against, PD = Points difference, TF = Tries for, TA = Tries against, TB = Try bonus points, LB = Losing bonus points, Pts = Log points
Competition rules:
Qualification: The top four teams qualified for the semifinals. Points breakdown: * 4 points for a win * 2 points for a draw * 1 bonus point for a loss by seven points or less * 1 bonus point for scoring four or more tries in a match

=== Matches ===
The following matches were played in the 2022 Varsity Cup:

==== Round one ====
14 February 2022	NWU Eagles	26–35	UCT Ikey Tigers	Fanie du Toit Sport Ground, Potchefstroom
17:00	Try: Bertram 14'; Genis 28'; Con: Petersen 16' 29'; Pen: Petersen 6' 11' 25' 29'	Report	Try: Hartzenberg 22'; Fredericks 42'; Rose 46'; Christian 72'; Koevort 80'; Con: Hayes 23' 47'; Fredericks 43'; Bowman 80+1'

14 February 2022	UP Tuks	9–19	Maties	Danie Craven Stadium, Stellenbosch
19:00	Pen: Burger 12' 20' 50'	Report	Try: Swart 70'; Con: Mathee 71'; Pen: Van der Bank 11' 23' 43'; Mathee 80'

14 February 2022	UWC	16–56	UFS Shimlas	UWC Sport Stadium, Cape Town
19:00		Report

14 February 2022	Wits	31–20	NMU Madibaz	Wits Rugby Stadium, Johannesburg
19:00		Report

14 February 2022	CUT Ixias	44–44	UJ	CUT Stadium, Bloemfontein
19:00	Try: Drotske 23'; Stander 35'; Rampai 38'; Van Wyk 59'; Pen try 63'; Kotze 68'; Con: Brand 24' 36' 39' 60' 69'	Report	Try: Terblanche 11' 16'; Apea-Adu 28'; Pawson 32'; Rampai 54'; Masuku 72'; Con: Viljoen 29' 33' 55' 73'; Pen: Viljoen 2' 63'

==== Round two ====
21 February 2022	NWU Eagles	40–19	UWC	Fanie du Toit Sport Ground, Potchefstroom
17:00		Report

21 February 2022	UFS Shimlas	50–28	Maties	Shimla Park, Bloemfontein
19:00		Report

21 February 2022	UCT Ikey Tigers	26–24	UJ	UCT Rugby Fields, Cape Town
19:00		Report

21 February 2022	NMU Madibaz	6–22	UP Tuks	NMU Stadium, Port Elizabeth
19:00		Report

21 February 2022	Wits	20–18	CUT Ixias	Wits Rugby Stadium, Johannesburg
19:00		Report

==== Round three ====
28 February 2022	CUT Ixias	27–48	UFS Shimlas	CUT Stadium, Bloemfontein
17:00		Report

28 February 2022	UP Tuks	38–30	UCT Ikey Tigers	LC de Villiers Stadium, Pretoria
19:00		Report

28 February 2022	Maties	37–10	Wits	Danie Craven Stadium, Stellenbosch
19:00		Report

28 February 2022	UJ	35–14	NWU Eagles	UJ Stadium, Johannesburg
19:00		Report

28 February 2022	UWC	60–26	NMU Madibaz	UWC Sport Stadium, Cape Town
19:00		Report

==== Round four ====
7 March 2022	NMU Madibaz	36–25	CUT Ixias	NMU Stadium, Port Elizabeth
17:00		Report

7 March 2022	NWU Eagles	17–8	UP Tuks	Fanie du Toit Sport Ground, Potchefstroom
19:00		Report

7 March 2022	Maties	40–36	UJ	Danie Craven Stadium, Stellenbosch
19:00		Report

7 March 2022	Wits	53–31	UFS Shimlas	Wits Rugby Stadium, Johannesburg
19:00		Report

7 March 2022	UCT Ikey Tigers	51–26	UWC	UCT Rugby Fields, Cape Town
19:00		Report

==== Round five ====
14 March 2022	UWC	19–51	UP Tuks	UWC Sport Stadium, Cape Town
17:00		Report

14 March 2022	UJ	29–24	Wits	UJ Stadium, Johannesburg
19:00		Report

14 March 2022	CUT Ixias	19–52	Maties	CUT Stadium, Bloemfontein
19:00		Report

14 March 2022	UFS Shimlas	22–32	NWU Eagles	Shimla Park, Bloemfontein
19:00		Report

14 March 2022	UCT Ikey Tigers	33–26	NMU Madibaz	UCT Rugby Fields, Cape Town
19:00		Report

==== Round six ====
21 March 2022	Wits	51–12	UWC	Wits Rugby Stadium, Johannesburg
17:00		Report

21 March 2022	Maties	20–12	NWU Eagles	Danie Craven Stadium, Stellenbosch
19:00		Report

21 March 2022	UP Tuks	61–12	CUT Ixias	LC de Villiers Stadium, Pretoria
19:00		Report

21 March 2022	NMU Madibaz	9–24	UJ	NMU Stadium, Port Elizabeth
19:00		Report

22 March 2022	UFS Shimlas	58–7	UCT Ikey Tigers	Shimla Park, Bloemfontein
09:00		Report

==== Round seven ====
28 March 2022	UWC	44–38	CUT Ixias	UWC Sport Stadium, Cape Town
19:00		Report

28 March 2022	UCT Ikey Tigers	44–27	Maties	UCT Rugby Fields, Cape Town
19:00		Report

28 March 2022	UP Tuks	39-24	Wits	LC de Villiers Stadium, Pretoria
19:00		Report

28 March 2022	NWU Eagles	61–26	NMU Madibaz	Fanie du Toit Sport Ground, Potchefstroom
19:00		Report

28 March 2022	UJ	26–37	UFS Shimlas	UJ Stadium, Johannesburg
19:00		Report

==== Round eight ====
4 April 2022	UWC	28–50	UJ	UWC Sport Stadium, Cape Town
17:00		Report

4 April 2022	UFS Shimlas	26-15	UP Tuks	Shimla Park, Bloemfontein
19:00		Report

4 April 2022	Maties	61–21	NMU Madibaz	Danie Craven Stadium, Stellenbosch
19:00		Report

4 April 2022	CUT Ixias	14–33	NWU Eagles	CUT Stadium, Bloemfontein
19:00		Report

4 April 2022	Wits	23–47	UCT Ikey Tigers	Wits Rugby Stadium, Johannesburg
19:00		Report

==== Round nine ====
11 April 2022	UJ	19–36	UP Tuks	UJ Stadium, Johannesburg
17:00	Con: Maties	Report

11 April 2022	Maties	40–31	UWC	Danie Craven Stadium, Stellenbosch
19:00		Report

11 April 2022	NWU Eagles	31–3	Wits	Fanie du Toit Sport Ground, Potchefstroom
19:00		Report

11 April 2022	NMU Madibaz	24–72	UFS Shimlas	NMU Stadium, Port Elizabeth
19:00		Report

11 April 2022	UCT Ikey Tigers	34–22	CUT Ixias	UCT Rugby Fields, Cape Town
19:00		Report

== Play-offs ==
Semi-finals
18 April 2022
UCT Ikey Tigers	19
Maties	58
18 April 2022
UFS Shimlas	21
UP Tuks	29

Final
25 April 2022
Maties	23
UP Tuks	29

=== Semi-finals ===
18 April 2022
17:00

UCT Ikey Tigers	19–58	Maties
Cards: Louw (yellow card) 0'	Report	Try: Dlamini 4'

UCT Rugby Fields, Cape Town

18 April 2022
19:15

UFS Shimlas	21-29	UP Tuks
Try: Van Heyningen 9'; Mahlasi 18'; Van der Merwe 31'; Con: Lourens 10', 19'	Report	Try: Coetzee 6'; Van der Linde 35'; Daniels 41'; Con: Coetzee (42 p); Pen: Coetzee (20 p), (41 p), (64 p), (69 p)

Shimla Park, Bloemfontein

=== Final ===
25 April 2022
19:15

Maties	23–29	UP Tuks
Try: Mavovana 3'; Pen: Fleurs (12 p), (21 p), (30 p), (35 p), (43 p), (51 p)	Report	Try: Van der Linde 24', 77'; Mokoena 52', 69'; Con: Walter 79'; Pen: Coetzee (30 p)

Danie Craven Stadium, Stellenbosch

Maties	Tuks

FB	15	Adriaan van der Bank (c)
RW	14	Mike Mavovana
OC	13	Waqar Solaan
IC	12	Taigh Schoor
LW	11	Anton du Toit
FH	10	Nevaldo Fleurs
SH	9	Thomas Bursey
N8	8	Simon Miller
OF	7	Louw Nel
BF	6	Gift Dlamini
RL	5	Matt Gray
LL	4	Juan Beukes
TP	3	Matimu Manganyi
HK	2	Sean Swart
LP	1	Vernon Matongo
Replacements:
	16	Chris Rossouw
	17	Rhynhardt Rijnsburger
	18	Corné Weilbach
	19	Jesse Johnson
	20	Siyabonga Matanda
	21	Mckyle Volmoer
	22	Jurie Mathee
	23	Ghaalieb Kenny
Coach:
Norman Jordaan

FB	15	Stefan Coetzee
RW	14	Kabelo Mokoena
OC	13	Lincoln Daniels (c)
IC	12	Pierre Fourie
LW	11	Tharquinn Manuel
FH	10	Walter Visser
SH	9	Bernard van der Linde
N8	8	Orateng Koikanyang
OF	7	Stephan Smit
BF	6	Dian Schoonees
RL	5	Divan Venter
LL	4	Mihlali Stamper
TP	3	Francois Klopper
HK	2	Allister Williams
LP	1	Ethan Burger
Replacements:
	16	Werner Fourie
	17	Andre van der Merwe
	18	Daniël Wessels
	19	Justice Nkombua
	20	Hilton Gie
	21	Chad-Lee Valentine
	22	Keane Galant
	23	Ambesa Zenzile
Coach:
Tlisane Motaung

Player of the Match:
Stephan Smit UP Tuks

== Honours ==
The honour roll for the 2022 Varsity Cup was as follows:

2022 Varsity Cup Honours
Champions:	UP Tuks (5th title)
Player That Rocks:	Lourens Oosthuizen, UFS Shimlas
Forward That Rocks:	Thabo Ndimande, UFS Shimlas
Back That Rocks:	Nevaldo Fleurs, Maties
Top Points Scorer:	Zander Du Plesis, UP Tuks (159)
Top Try Scorer:	Sean Swart, Maties (12)
