= Anele =

Anele is a given name. Notable people with the name include:

- Anele Lungisa (born 1992), South African rugby union player
- Anele Mdoda (born 1984), South African television presenter
- Anele Ngcongca (1987–2020), South African footballer
