= Michael Amiras =

South African rugby union player

- Full name: Michael Amiras
- Born: 22 November 1999 (age 26) South Africa
- Height: 1.93 m (6 ft 4 in)
- Weight: 109 kg (17 st 2 lb; 240 lb)

Rugby union career
- Position: Flanker / Lock
- Current team: Griquas
Senior career
Years	Team	Apps	(Points)
2021	Slava Moscow	7	(10)
2022–	Griquas	8	(10)
- Correct as of 10 July 2022

Michael Amiras (born 22 November 1999) is a South African rugby union player for the Griquas in the Currie Cup. His regular position is flanker.

Amiras was named in the Griquas side for the 2022 Currie Cup Premier Division. He made his Currie Cup debut for the Griquas against the Free State Cheetahs in Round 1 of the 2022 Currie Cup Premier Division.
