= Lucky Dlepu =

South African rugby union player

- Full name: Lucky Dlepu
- Born: 7 November 1999 (age 27) South Africa
- Height: 1.72 m (5 ft 7 1/2 in)
- Weight: 72 kg (11 st 5 lb; 159 lb)

Rugby union career
- Position: Scrum-half
- Current team: Pumas
Senior career
Years	Team	Apps	(Points)
2020–2022	Sharks	0	(0)
2020–2021	Sharks	0	(0)
2022–	Pumas	6	(0)
- Correct as of 10 July 2022

Lucky Dlepu (born 7 November 1999) is a South African rugby union player for the Sharks in the United Rugby Championship and the Pumas in the Currie Cup. His regular position is scrum-half.

Dlepu was named in the Pumas side for the 2022 Currie Cup Premier Division. He made his Currie Cup debut for the Pumas against the Blue Bulls in Round 1 of the 2022 Currie Cup Premier Division.
