= Sergio Moreira =

South African rugby union player

- Full name: Sergio Moreira
- Born: 11 July 2000 (age 26) South Africa
- Height: 1.95 m (6 ft 5 in)
- Weight: 110 kg (17 st 5 lb; 243 lb)

Rugby union career
- Position: Lock
- Current team: Cheetahs / Free State Cheetahs
Youth career
- Montpellier
Senior career
Years	Team	Apps	(Points)
2022–	Cheetahs		
2022–	Free State Cheetahs	4	(0)
2022–2024	Kamaishi Seawaves	6	(0)
- Correct as of 10 July 2022

Sergio Moreira (born 11 July 2000) is a South African rugby union player for the Free State Cheetahs in the Currie Cup. His regular position is lock.

Moreira was named in the Free State Cheetahs side for the 2022 Currie Cup Premier Division. He made his Currie Cup debut for the Free State Cheetahs against the Griquas in Round 1 of the 2022 Currie Cup Premier Division.

Moria has been called into camp by the Portugal national rugby union team.
