= Jacques van Zyl =

South African rugby union player

- Full name: Jacques van Zyl
- Born: 13 February 1996 (age 30) South Africa
- Height: 1.78 m (5 ft 10 in)
- Weight: 110 kg (17 st 5 lb; 243 lb)

Rugby union career
- Position: Hooker
Senior career
Years	Team	Apps	(Points)
2022	Western Province	5	(5)
- Correct as of 23 July 2022

Jacques van Zyl (born 13 February 1996) is a South African rugby union player for the Western Province in the Currie Cup. His regular position is hooker.

Van Zyl was named in the Western Province side for the 2022 Currie Cup Premier Division. He made his Currie Cup debut for the Western Province against the Golden Lions in Round 1 of the 2022 Currie Cup Premier Division.
