= Werner Gouws =

South African rugby union player

- Full name: Werner Gouws
- Born: 10 February 2000 (age 26) Port Elizabeth, South Africa
- Height: 1.90 m (6 ft 3 in)
- Weight: 99 kg (15 st 8 lb; 218 lb)

Rugby union career
- Position: Flanker
- Current team: Griquas
Senior career
Years	Team	Apps	(Points)
2022–	Blue Bulls	2	(0)
2022–	→ Griquas	3	(5)
- Correct as of 10 July 2022

Werner Gouws (born 10 February 2000) is a South African rugby union player for the Blue Bulls in the Currie Cup. His regular position is flanker.

Gouws was named in the Blue Bulls side for the 2022 Currie Cup Premier Division. He made his debut for the Blue Bulls in Round 7 of the 2022 Currie Cup Premier Division against the Golden Lions.
