= Ngia Selengbe =

Congolese rugby union player

- Full name: Ngia Selengbe
- Born: 9 June 2001 (age 25) Democratic Republic of Congo
- Height: 1.82 m (5 ft 11 1/2 in)
- Weight: 93 kg (14 st 9 lb; 205 lb)
- School: King Edwards VII
- University: University of Witwatersrand

Rugby union career
- Position: Wing
Senior career
Years	Team	Apps	(Points)
2021–2022	Lions	0	(0)
2022	Golden Lions	2	(0)
2026	USRC Tigers RFC	0	(0)
- Correct as of 15 January 2026

Ngia Selengbe is a Congolese rugby union player for the Golden Lions in the Currie Cup. His regular position is wing.

Selengbe was named in the Golden Lions side for the 2022 Currie Cup Premier Division. He made his Currie Cup debut for the Golden Lions against the Pumas in Round 8 of the 2022 Currie Cup Premier Division.

In January 2026 he joined the prestigious rugby club USRC Tigers RFC in the Hong Kong Premiership.
