= Ebenezer Tshimanga =

South African rugby union player

- Full name: Ebenezer Tshimanga
- Born: 7 February 2002 (age 24) Democratic Republic of Congo
- Height: 1.88 m (6 ft 2 in)
- Weight: 104 kg (229 lb)

Rugby union career
- Position: Wing
- Current team: Section Paloise
Senior career
Years	Team	Apps	(Points)
2022	Western Province	3	(0)
2023	Section Paloise	0	(0)
- Correct as of 27 June 2023

Ebenezer Tshimanga is a South African rugby union player for Section Paloise in the Top 14. His regular position is wing.

Tshimanga was named in the Western Province side for the 2022 Currie Cup Premier Division. He made his Currie Cup debut for the Western Province against the Pumas in Round 11 of the 2022 Currie Cup Premier Division.
