= Sibusiso Shongwe =

South African rugby union player

- Full name: Sibusiso Shongwe
- Born: 9 September 2001 (age 25) South Africa
- Height

Rugby union career
- Position: Prop
Senior career
| Years | Team | Apps | (Points) |
| 2021–2022 | Golden Lions | 2 | (0) |
- Correct as of 21 January 2022

Sibusiso Shongwe (born 9 September 2001) is a South African rugby union player for the Golden Lions in the Currie Cup. His regular position is prop.

Shongwe was named in the Golden Lions side for the 2022 Currie Cup Premier Division. He made his Currie Cup debut for the Golden Lions against the Western Province in Round 1 of the 2022 Currie Cup Premier Division.
