= Tyler Bocks =

South African rugby union player

- Full name: Tyler Bocks
- Born: 8 February 2001 (age 25) Western Cape, South Africa
- Height: 190 cm (6 ft 3 in)
- Weight: 94 kg (207 lb)

Rugby union career
- Position: Centre
- Current team: Golden Lions
Senior career
Years	Team	Apps	(Points)
2022–2024	Golden Lions	16	(0)
- Correct as of 13 June 2023

Tyler Bocks (born 8 February 2001) is a South African rugby union player for the Golden Lions in the Currie Cup. His regular position is centre.

Bocks was named in the Golden Lions side for the 2022 Currie Cup Premier Division. He made his Currie Cup debut for the Golden Lions against the Western Province in Round 1 of the 2022 Currie Cup Premier Division and was named in the Lion's United Rugby Championship squad in 2023/24.

Bocks represented the South African Schools team in 2018, and played for the Junior Springboks in 2021.
