= Kowie Roos =

South African rugby union player

- Full name: Kowie Roos
- Born: South Africa
- Height: 1.96 m (6 ft 5 in)
- Weight: 142 kg (22 st 5 lb; 313 lb)

Rugby union career
- Position: Prop
Senior career
Years	Team	Apps	(Points)
2022	Blue Bulls	2	(0)
- Correct as of 23 July 2022

Kowie Roos is a South African rugby union player for the Blue Bulls in the Currie Cup. His regular position is prop.

Roos was named in the Blue Bulls side for the 2022 Currie Cup Premier Division. He made his debut for the Blue Bulls in Round 5 of the 2022 Currie Cup Premier Division against the Griquas.
