= Sasko Ndlovu =

South African rugby union player

- Full name: Siyemukela Ndlovu
- Born: South Africa
- School: Northwood

Rugby union career
- Position: Flanker
Senior career
Years	Team	Apps	(Points)
2022	Golden Lions	3	(5)
- Correct as of 15 April 2022

Sasko Ndlovu is a South African rugby union player for the Golden Lions in the Currie Cup. His regular position is flank.

Ndlovu was named in the Golden Lions side for the 2022 Currie Cup Premier Division. He made his Currie Cup debut for the Golden Lions against the Blue Bulls in Round 7 of the 2022 Currie Cup Premier Division.
