= Kudzwai Dube =

South African rugby union player

- Full name: Kudzwai Dube
- Born: 16 December 1999 (age 26) South Africa
- Height: 1.83 m (6 ft 0 in)
- Weight: 115 kg (18 st 2 lb; 254 lb)

Rugby union career
- Position: Prop
- Current team: Griquas
Senior career
| Years | Team | Apps | (Points) |
| 2022– | Griquas | 14 | (5) |
- Correct as of 10 July 2022
International career
| Years | Team | Apps | (Points) |
| 2019 | South Africa U20 | 5 | (5) |
- Correct as of 16 January 2022

Kudzwai Dube (born 16 December 1999) is a South African rugby union player for the Griquas in the Currie Cup. His regular position is prop.

Dube was named in the Griquas side for the 2022 Currie Cup Premier Division. He made his Currie Cup debut for the Griquas against the Free State Cheetahs in Round 1 of the 2022 Currie Cup Premier Division.
