= Gerado Jaars =

South African rugby union player

- Full name: Gerado Jaars
- Born: South Africa

Rugby union career
- Position: Scrum-half
Senior career
Years	Team	Apps	(Points)
2022	Sharks (Currie Cup)	1	(0)
- Correct as of 23 July 2022

Gerado Jaars is a South African rugby union player for the Sharks in the Currie Cup. His regular position is scrum-half.

Jaars was named in the Sharks side for the 2022 Currie Cup Premier Division. He made his Currie Cup debut for the Sharks against the Golden Lions in Round 13 of the 2022 Currie Cup Premier Division.
