= Junior White =

South African rugby union player

- Full name: Junior White
- Born: South Africa

Rugby union career
- Position: Lock
Senior career
Years	Team	Apps	(Points)
2022	Golden Lions	3	(0)
- Correct as of 10 May 2022

Junior White is a South African rugby union player for the Golden Lions in the Currie Cup. His regular position is lock.

White was named in the Golden Lions side for the 2022 Currie Cup Premier Division. He made his Currie Cup debut for the Golden Lions against the Pumas in Round 8 of the 2022 Currie Cup Premier Division.
