= Willie Potgieter =

South African rugby union player

- Full name: Willie Potgieter
- Born: 5 January 2002 (age 24) South Africa

Rugby union career
- Position: Lock / Flanker / Number 8
- Current team: Kobelco Steelers
Senior career
Years	Team	Apps	(Points)
2022–2023	Blue Bulls	2	(0)
2023–	Kobelco Steelers	24	(25)
- Correct as of 23 July 2022

Willie Potgieter (born 5 January 2002) is a South African rugby union player for the Blue Bulls in the Currie Cup. His regular position is lock, flanker or number 8.

Potgieter attended Affies, where he was named in the Blue Bulls XV (second team) for Craven Week as a Grade 11. Potgieter was named in the Blue Bulls side for the 2022 Currie Cup Premier Division. He made his debut for the Blue Bulls in the semi-final of the 2022 Currie Cup Premier Division against the Griquas.
