= Andries Viljoen =

South African rugby union player

- Full name: Andries Viljoen
- Born: 8 October 1997 (age 29) South Africa
- Height: 1.89 m (6 ft 2 1/2 in)
- Weight: 95 kg (14 st 13 lb; 209 lb)

Rugby union career
- Position: Centre
Senior career
Years	Team	Apps	(Points)
2018–2021	Boland Cavaliers	19	(5)
2020	NTT Shining Arcs	0	(0)
2021	Strela Kazan	2	(0)
2022	Pumas	1	(0)
- Correct as of 10 July 2022

Andries Viljoen (born 8 October 1997) is a South African rugby union player for the Pumas in the Currie Cup. His regular position is centre.

Viljoen was named in the Pumas side for the 2022 Currie Cup Premier Division. He made his Currie Cup debut for the Pumas against the Golden Lions in Round 2 of the 2022 Currie Cup Premier Division.
