= James Mollentze =

South African rugby union player

- Full name: James Mollentze
- Born: 8 July 1999 (age 27) Western Cape, South Africa
- Height: 1.81 m (5 ft 11 1/2 in)
- Weight: 98 kg (15 st 6 lb; 216 lb)

Rugby union career
- Position: Fly-half / Centre
- Current team: Toyota Shuttles
Senior career
Years	Team	Apps	(Points)
2020–2021	Lions	0	(0)
2021–2022	Golden Lions	8	(10)
2022–	Toyota Shuttles	52	(150)
- Correct as of 15 April 2022
International career
Years	Team	Apps	(Points)
2019	South Africa U20	4	(0)
- Correct as of 16 January 2022

James Mollentze (born 8 July 1999) is a South African rugby union player for the Golden Lions in the Currie Cup. His regular position is fly-half or centre.

Mollentze was named in the Golden Lions side for the 2022 Currie Cup Premier Division. He made his Currie Cup debut for the Golden Lions against the Western Province in Round 1 of the 2022 Currie Cup Premier Division.
