= Ethan Fisher =

South African rugby union player

- Full name: Ethan Derek Fisher
- Born: 29 January 2001 (age 25) Johannesburg, South Africa
- Height: 184 cm (6 ft 0 in)
- Weight: 100 kg (220 lb)
- School: King Edward VII School, Johannesburg
- University: University of South Africa

Rugby union career
- Position: Centre
- Current team: El Salvador
Senior career
Years	Team	Apps	(Points)
2022	Sharks (Currie Cup)	4	(0)
2023–2024	Pumas	1	
2024–2026	Rovigo Delta		
2026–	El Salvador		
- Correct as of 20 July 2026

Ethan Fisher (born 29 January 2001) is a South African rugby union player for the El Salvador in the Spanish Division de Honor. His regular position is centre.

Fisher was named in the Sharks side for the 2022 Currie Cup Premier Division. He made his Currie Cup debut for the Sharks against the Blue Bulls in Round 6 of the 2022 Currie Cup Premier Division.In 2023 and 2024 he played for Pumas in the Currie Cup.
