= Ethan James (rugby union) =

South African rugby union player

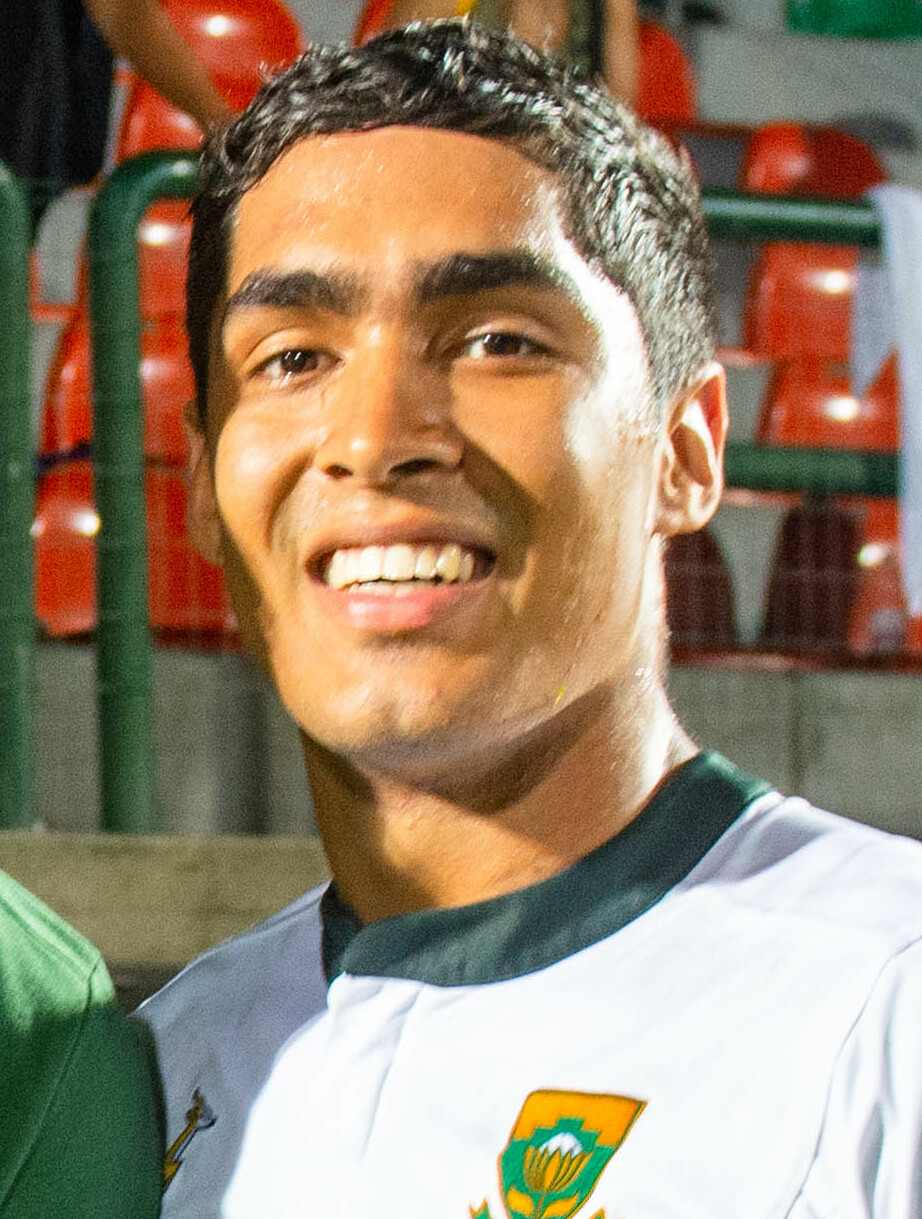
- Full name: Ethan James
- Born: 14 November 2002 (age 23) Paarl
- Height: 1.78 m (5 ft 10 in)
- Weight: 80 kg (176 lb)
- School: Paarl Gimnasuim

Rugby union career
- Position: Centre
Senior career
Years	Team	Apps	(Points)
2022	Western Province	2	(0)
- Correct as of 23 July 2022

Ethan James is a South African rugby union player for the Western Province in the Currie Cup. His regular position is centre.

James was named in the Western Province side for the 2022 Currie Cup Premier Division. He made his Currie Cup debut for the Western Province against the Sharks in Round 3 of the 2022 Currie Cup Premier Division.
