= Simon Raw =

South African rugby union player

- Full name: Simon Raw
- Born: 2 August 1994 (age 32) South Africa
- Height: 1.86 m (6 ft 1 in)
- Weight: 125 kg (19 st 10 lb; 276 lb)

Rugby union career
- Position: Prop
- Current team: Pumas
Senior career
Years	Team	Apps	(Points)
2019	Boland Cavaliers	4	(0)
2020–2021	Aubenas	12	(0)
2021	Châteaurenard	7	(0)
2022–	Pumas	10	(15)
2022	→ Griffons	2	(0)
- Correct as of 10 July 2022

Simon Raw (born 2 August 1994) is a South African rugby union player for the Pumas in the Currie Cup. His regular position is prop.

Raw was named in the Pumas side for the 2022 Currie Cup Premier Division. He made his Currie Cup debut for the Pumas against the Blue Bulls in Round 1 of the 2022 Currie Cup Premier Division.
