= Ockie Barnard =

South African rugby union player

- Full name: Ockie Barnard
- Born: 21 April 2001 (age 25) Richards Bay, South Africa
- Height: 1.99 m (6 ft 6 1/2 in)
- Weight: 110 kg (17 st 5 lb; 243 lb)
- School: Westville Boys' High School

Rugby union career
- Position: Lock
- Current team: Panasonic Wild Knights
Senior career
Years	Team	Apps	(Points)
2022	Free State Cheetahs	9	(0)
2023	Sharks	1	(0)
2023	Sharks (Currie Cup)	0	(0)
2023–	Panasonic Wild Knights	13	(10)
- Correct as of 10 July 2022

Ockie Barnard (born 21 April 2001) is a South African rugby union player for the Free State Cheetahs in the Currie Cup. His regular position is lock.

Barnard was named in the Free State Cheetahs side for the 2022 Currie Cup Premier Division. He made his Currie Cup debut for the Free State Cheetahs against the Golden Lions in Round 5 of the 2022 Currie Cup Premier Division.
