= Raynard Roets =

South African rugby union player

- Full name: Raynard Roets
- Born: 9 April 2001 (age 25) South Africa
- Height: 1.97 m (6 ft 5 1/2 in)
- Weight: 108 kg (17 st 0 lb; 238 lb)

Rugby union career
- Position: Lock
- Current team: Golden Lions
Senior career
Years	Team	Apps	(Points)
2021–2022	Bulls	0	(0)
2022	Blue Bulls	7	(0)
2023–	Golden Lions	23	(15)
2023–	Lions	5	(0)
- Correct as of 8 September 2025

Raynard Roets (born 9 April 2001) is a South African rugby union player for the Blue Bulls in the Currie Cup. His regular position is lock.

Roets was named in the Blue Bulls side for the 2022 Currie Cup Premier Division. He made his Currie Cup debut for the Blue Bulls against the Free State Cheetahs in Round 2 of the 2022 Currie Cup Premier Division.
