= Murray Koster =

South African rugby union player

- Born: 12 February 1999 (age 27) East London, Eastern Cape, South Africa
- Height: 6 ft 2 in (1.88 m)
- Weight: 98 kg (216 lb; 15 st 6 lb)
- School: St. Andrew's College, Grahamstown

Rugby union career
- Position: Centre
Youth career
- 2017: Eastern Province Elephants
- 2018–2020: Sharks
Senior career
Years	Team	Apps	(Points)
2019	Sharks XV	1	(0)
2020–2024	Sharks	3	(0)
2020–2024	Sharks (Currie Cup)	11	(13)
2024–2026	Hino Red Dolphins	20	(15)
- Correct as of 23 July 2022

Murray Koster (born 12 February 1999) is a South African rugby union player from East London, Eastern Cape. He is playing as a centre for the Hino Red Dolphins in Japan Rugby League One, having joined the club ahead of the 2024–25 season. He previously represented the Sharks in the United Rugby Championship and the Currie Cup.

Koster came through the Sharks’ junior structures, featuring for their Under-19 and Under-21 teams before making his senior debut in 2021. He went on to play in both domestic and United Rugby Championship competitions for the franchise before securing a move to Japan.

== Early life and career ==
Koster was educated at St. Andrew's College, Grahamstown, and played rugby for the school. For his performances during Craven Week, he was called up to play for Eastern Province Elephants to play for their Country Districts team in 2017 but left them to join the Sharks youth system in 2018. In the same year, he played for the Sharks' Currie Cup team when they won the 2018 Under-19 Provincial Championship against the Blue Bulls. In 2019, Koster played for the Sharks XV in the Rugby Challenge. Later in the year, he was invited to a South Africa national under-20 rugby union team selection camp for the Junior Springboks in the 2019 World Rugby Under 20 Championship, however he was not selected. In 2020, he was added to the Sharks' Super Rugby squad. However, a few months later, the season was cancelled due to the COVID-19 pandemic. The teams from South Africa instead played in the Super Rugby Unlocked tournament over October and November.

In 2021, Koster made his professional rugby debut for the Sharks against the Griquas in the Preparation Series. However he missed the start of the Pro14 Rainbow Cup due to injury. On 10 July, he was selected to play for the Sharks in their second match against the touring British and Irish Lions, paired in the centre with Werner Kok. This followed the Lions having to rearrange their tour after their match against the Bulls was suspended following a COVID-19 outbreak in the Bulls team.
