= Jacque-Louis du Toit =

South African rugby union player

- Full name: Jacque-Louis du Toit
- Born: South Africa

Rugby union career
- Position: Hooker
- Current team: Golden Lions
Senior career
Years	Team	Apps	(Points)
2022–	Golden Lions	4	(5)
- Correct as of 15 July 2024

Jacque-Louis du Toit is a South African rugby union player for the Golden Lions in the Currie Cup. His regular position is hooker.

Du Toit was named in the Golden Lions side for the 2022 Currie Cup Premier Division. He made his Currie Cup debut for the Golden Lions against the Griquas in Round 6 of the 2022 Currie Cup Premier Division.
