= Boldwin Hansen =

South African rugby union player

- Full name: Boldwin Hansen
- Born: 26 March 2001 (age 25) South Africa
- Height: 1.89 m (6 ft 2 1/2 in)
- Weight: 93 kg (14 st 9 lb; 205 lb)

Rugby union career
- Position: Wing / Fullback
- Current team: Golden Lions
Senior career
Years	Team	Apps	(Points)
2022–2024	Golden Lions	24	(50)
2023–2024	Lions	2	(0)
- Correct as of 16 September 2024

Boldwin Hansen (born 26 March 2001) is a South African rugby union player for the Golden Lions in the Currie Cup. His regular position is wing or fullback.

Hansen was named in the Golden Lions side for the 2022 Currie Cup Premier Division. He made his Currie Cup debut for the Golden Lions against the Western Province in Round 1 of the 2022 Currie Cup Premier Division.
