= Heiko Pohlmann =

South African rugby union player

- Full name: Heiko Pohlmann
- Born: 16 January 2002 (age 24) South Africa
- Height: 1.85 m (6 ft 1 in)
- Weight: 128 kg (20 st 2 lb; 282 lb)

Rugby union career
- Position: Prop
Senior career
Years	Team	Apps	(Points)
2022–	Golden Lions	9	(0)
2024–	Lions	5	(0)
- Correct as of 6 October 2025

Heiko Pohlmann (born 16 January 2002) is a South African rugby union player for the Golden Lions in the Currie Cup. His regular position is prop.

Pohlmann was named in the Golden Lions side for the 2022 Currie Cup Premier Division. He made his Currie Cup debut for the Golden Lions against the Western Province in Round 1 of the 2022 Currie Cup Premier Division.
