= Anele Lungisa =

South African rugby union player

- Full name: Anele Lungisa
- Born: 4 March 1992 (age 34) South Africa
- Height: 1.96 m (6 ft 5 in)
- Weight: 98 kg (15 st 6 lb; 216 lb)

Rugby union career
- Position: Lock / Flanker
- Current team: Krasny Yar Krasnoyarsk
Senior career
Years	Team	Apps	(Points)
2017–2021	Eastern Province Elephants	34	(25)
2022–2025	Pumas	10	(15)
2025–	Krasny Yar Krasnoyarsk		
- Correct as of 28 June 2025

Anele Lungisa (born 4 March 1992) is a South African rugby union player for the Pumas in the Currie Cup. His regular position is lock or flanker.

Lungisa was named in the Pumas side for the 2022 Currie Cup Premier Division. He made his Currie Cup debut for the Pumas against the Free State Cheetahs in Round 4 of the 2022 Currie Cup Premier Division.
