= Nico Steyn =

South African rugby union player

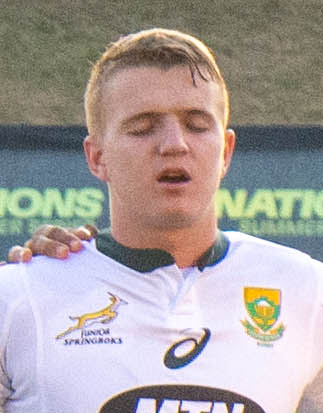
- Steyn in 2022
- Full name: Nico Steyn
- Born: 12 April 2002 (age 24) South Africa
- Height: 1.77 m (5 ft 9 1/2 in)
- Weight: 80 kg (12 st 8 lb; 176 lb)
- School: Glenwood High School
- University: Wits

Rugby union career
- Position: Scrum-half
- Current team: Lions / Golden Lions
Senior career
Years	Team	Apps	(Points)
2022–	Golden Lions	34	(94)
2022–	Lions	47	(37)
- Correct as of 3 November 2026

Nico Steyn (born 12 April 2002) is a South African rugby union player for the Golden Lions in the Currie Cup. He made his URC debut for the Lions in 2021. His regular position is scrum-half.

Steyn was named in the Golden Lions side for the 2022 Currie Cup Premier Division. He made his Currie Cup debut for the Golden Lions against the Western Province in Round 1 of the 2022 Currie Cup Premier Division. Steyn made his URC debut against Leinster on 25 February 2022 and was awarded his first SA cap when he represented the SA schools 7's side in 2019. Steyn was named Head Prefect in his Matric year and also 1st XV captain for Glenwood High School in 2020. He was also named NextgenXV MVP after a stellar season with the Green Machine cementing his place as one of South Africa's brightest talents. Steyn made his U20 Junior Springboks debut against Argentina in 2021. Steyn was selected in 2022 to be part of the U20 Junior Springboks squad which won the Under 20 Six Nations Summer Series in the final against Wales and was selected in the team of the tournament.
