= Lunga Ncube =

South African rugby union player

- Full name: Lunga Ncube
- Born: 26 May 2000 (age 26) Ulundi Kwa Zulu Natal , South Africa
- Height: 1.97 m (6 ft 5 1/2 in)
- Weight: 112 kg (247 lb)

Rugby union career
- Position: Lock
Senior career
Years	Team	Apps	(Points)
2019	Sharks XV	2	(5)
2021–2022	Golden Lions	9	(0)
2022	Lions	1	(0)
- Correct as of 16 September 2022

Lunga Ncube is a South African rugby union player for the Golden Lions in the Currie Cup. His regular position is lock.

Ncube was named in the Golden Lions squad for the 2021 Currie Cup Premier Division. He made his debut for the Golden Lions in Round 10 of the 2021 Currie Cup Premier Division against the Free State Cheetahs.
