= Munier Hartzenberg =

South African rugby union player

- Full name: Munier Hartzenberg
- Born: 1 August 1997 (age 29) South Africa
- Height: 1.82 m (5 ft 11 1/2 in)
- Weight: 88 kg (13 st 12 lb; 194 lb)

Rugby union career
- Position: Wing
- Current team: Cheetahs / Free State Cheetahs
Senior career
Years	Team	Apps	(Points)
2022	Griquas	14	(35)
2022–	Cheetahs		
2023–	Free State Cheetahs		
- Correct as of 10 July 2022

Munier Hartzenberg (born 1 August 1997) is a South African rugby union player for the Griquas in the Currie Cup. His regular position is wing.

Hartzenberg was named in the Griquas side for the 2022 Currie Cup Premier Division. He made his Currie Cup debut for the Griquas against the Free State Cheetahs in Round 1 of the 2022 Currie Cup Premier Division.
