= Corné Weilbach =

South African rugby union player

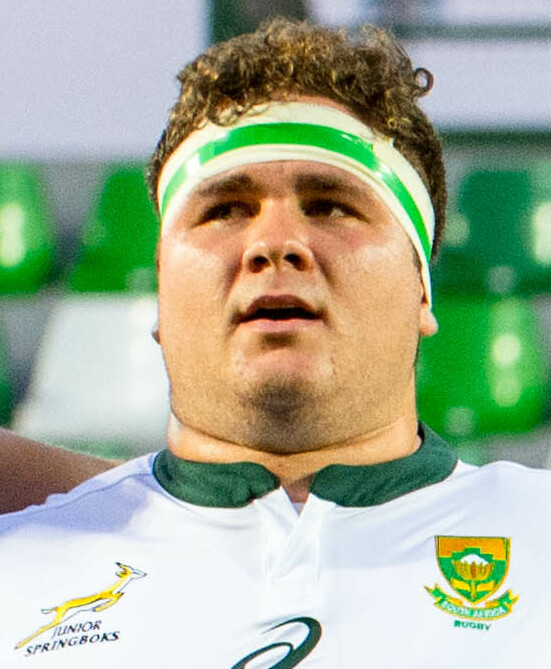
- Full name: Corné Weilbach
- Born: South Africa
- Height

Rugby union career
- Position: Prop
- Current team: Western Province
Senior career
Years	Team	Apps	(Points)
2022–	Western Province	1	(0)
- Correct as of 23 July 2022

Corné Weilbach is a South African rugby union player for Saracens in PREM Rugby. His regular position is prop.

Weilbach was named in the Western Province side for the 2022 Currie Cup Premier Division. He made his Currie Cup debut for the Western Province against the Blue Bulls in Round 2 of the 2022 Currie Cup Premier Division.. He joined Saracens ahead of the 2026-27 Gallagher PREM Season.
