= Jason Alexander (rugby union) =

South African rugby union player (born 2000)

- Full name: Jason Alexander
- Born: 22 September 2000 (age 26) South Africa
- Height: 1.74 m (5 ft 9 in)
- School: Wynberg Boys' High School

Rugby union career
- Position: Hooker
- Current team: Sharks (Currie Cup)
Senior career
Years	Team	Apps	(Points)
2021	Western Province	1	(0)
2022–	Sharks (Currie Cup)	1	(10)
- Correct as of 23 July 2022

Jason Alexander (born 22 September 2000) is a South African rugby union player for the Western Province in the Currie Cup. His regular position is hooker.

Alexander was named in the Western Province squad for the 2021 Currie Cup Premier Division. He made his debut for Western Province in Round 2 of the 2021 Currie Cup Premier Division against Golden Lions.
