= Bernard van der Linde =

South African rugby union player

- Full name: Bernard van der Linde
- Born: 30 November 2000 (age 25) Pretoria, South Africa
- Height: 1.74 m (5 ft 8 1/2 in)
- Weight: 83 kg (13 st 1 lb; 183 lb)
- School: Die Hoërskool Menlopark
- University: University of Pretoria

Rugby union career
- Position: Scrum-half
- Current team: Bath
Senior career
| Years | Team | Apps | (Points) |
| 2022–2025 | Blue Bulls | 7 | (5) |
| 2022–2025 | Bulls | | |
| 2025– | Bath | 10 | (15) |
- Correct as of 1 May 2026

Bernard van der Linde (born 30 November 2000) is a South African professional rugby union player. He previously played for the Blue Bulls in the Currie Cup and now plays for Bath Rugby. His regular position is scrum-half.

Van der Linde was named in the Blue Bulls side for the 2022 Currie Cup Premier Division. He made his debut for the Blue Bulls in Round 7 of the 2022 Currie Cup Premier Division against the Golden Lions.

On 4 February 2025, it was confirmed that van der Linde would join English side Bath on a two-year deal in the Premiership Rugby competition from the 2025–26 season.
