= George Lourens =

South African rugby union player

- Full name: George John Lourens
- Born: South Africa

Rugby union career
- Position: Fly-half
- Current team: Cheetahs / Free State Cheetahs
Senior career
Years	Team	Apps	(Points)
2021	Boland Cavaliers	7	(26)
2022–	Free State Cheetahs	1	(0)
2022–	Cheetahs		
- Correct as of 10 July 2022

George John Lourens is a South African rugby union player for the Free State Cheetahs in the Currie Cup. His regular position is fly-half.

Lourens was named in the Free State Cheetahs side for the 2022 Currie Cup Premier Division. He made his Currie Cup debut for the Free State Cheetahs against the Pumas in Round 13 of the 2022 Currie Cup Premier Division.
