= Tharquinn Manuel =

South African rugby union player

- Full name: Tharquinn Manuel
- Born: South Africa
- Height: 1.74
- Weight: 85 kg (187 lb)
- School: Stellenberg High School
- University: UP Tuks

Rugby union career
- Position: Wing
Senior career
Years	Team	Apps	(Points)
2022	Blue Bulls	3	(0)
- Correct as of 23 July 2022

Tharquinn Manuel is a South African rugby union player for the Blue Bulls in the Currie Cup. His regular position is wing.

Manuel was named in the Blue Bulls side for the 2022 Currie Cup Premier Division. He made his debut for the Blue Bulls in Round 12 of the 2022 Currie Cup Premier Division against the Pumas.
