= Cebo Dlamini =

South African rugby union player

- Full name: Cebolenkosi Dlamini
- Born: 29 November 2001 (age 24) Eshowe, South Africa
- Height: 176 cm (5 ft 9 in)
- Weight: 120 kg (265 lb)
- School: Maritzburg College

Rugby union career
- Position: Prop
- Current team: Griquas
Senior career
Years	Team	Apps	(Points)
2022	Blue Bulls	3	(5)
2023–2026	Griquas	58	(10)
2026	→ Dragons (loan)	7	(0)
2026–	Sale Sharks	0	(0)
- Correct as of 28 February 2026

Cebo Dlamini is a South African rugby union player for the Griquas in the Currie Cup, where he is their captain. He previously played for the Blue Bulls. His regular position is prop.

Dlamini was named in the Blue Bulls side for the 2022 Currie Cup Premier Division. He made his debut for the Blue Bulls in Round 7 of the 2022 Currie Cup Premier Division against the Golden Lions.

On 17 December 2025, Diamini was signed by Welsh region Dragons in the URC competition on a short-term deal for the 2025-26 season. On 10 March 2026, Diamini would move to England to join Sale Sharks in the Premiership Rugby on a two-year contract from the 2026-27 season.
