= Eduan Swart =

South African rugby union player

- Full name: Eduan Swart
- Born: 20 October 2000 (age 26) South Africa
- Height: 186 cm (6 ft 1 in)
- Weight: 115 kg (254 lb)
- School: Hoërskool Oos-Moot

Rugby union career
- Position: Hooker
- Current team: Pumas
Senior career
Years	Team	Apps	(Points)
2021–2023	Pumas	39	(80)
2023–2024	→ Scarlets	6	(5)
2025–	Sharks	2	(0)

Eduan Swart (born 20 October 2000) is a South African rugby union player who plays for the Sharks in the United Rugby Championship as a hooker.

Swart was named in the Pumas squad for the Round 6 match of the 2020–21 Currie Cup Premier Division competition. He made his debut in the same match against the Golden Lions, coming on as a replacement.

During the 2023–24 United Rugby Championship, Swart joined the Scarlets on loan. Swart scored a last minute try to help the Scarlets beat Benetton, in a comeback win.

Swart joined the Sharks for the 2025–26 United Rugby Championship.
