= Gianni Lombard =

South African rugby union player

- Full name: Gianni Dean Lombard
- Born: 22 January 1998 (age 28) Worcester, South Africa
- Height: 1.78 m (5 ft 10 in)
- Weight: 78 kg (172 lb; 12 st 4 lb)
- School: Paarl Boys' High School

Rugby union career
- Position: Fly-half / Wing / Fullback
- Current team: Lions / Golden Lions
Youth career
- 2011: Boland Cavaliers
- 2014–2016: Western Province
- 2017–2019: Golden Lions
Senior career
Years	Team	Apps	(Points)
2018	Golden Lions XV	1	(0)
2018–2021	Golden Lions	2	(0)
2019–2021	Lions	10	(3)
2022	NTT Red Hurricanes	4	(8)
2022–2026	Golden Lions	16	(27)
2022–2026	Lions	42	(142)
- Correct as of 29 April 2026
International career
Years	Team	Apps	(Points)
2016	South Africa Schools	3	(26)
2017–2018	South Africa Under-20	10	(31)
- Correct as of 16 September 2018

Gianni Dean Lombard (born 22 January 1998) is a South African rugby union player for the Golden Lions in the Currie Cup and the Golden Lions XV in the Rugby Challenge. His regular position is Fly-half or fullback.

Lombard signed with the Sharks on 4 February 2026, after eight years with the Lions.
