= Rynhardt Jonker =

South African rugby union player

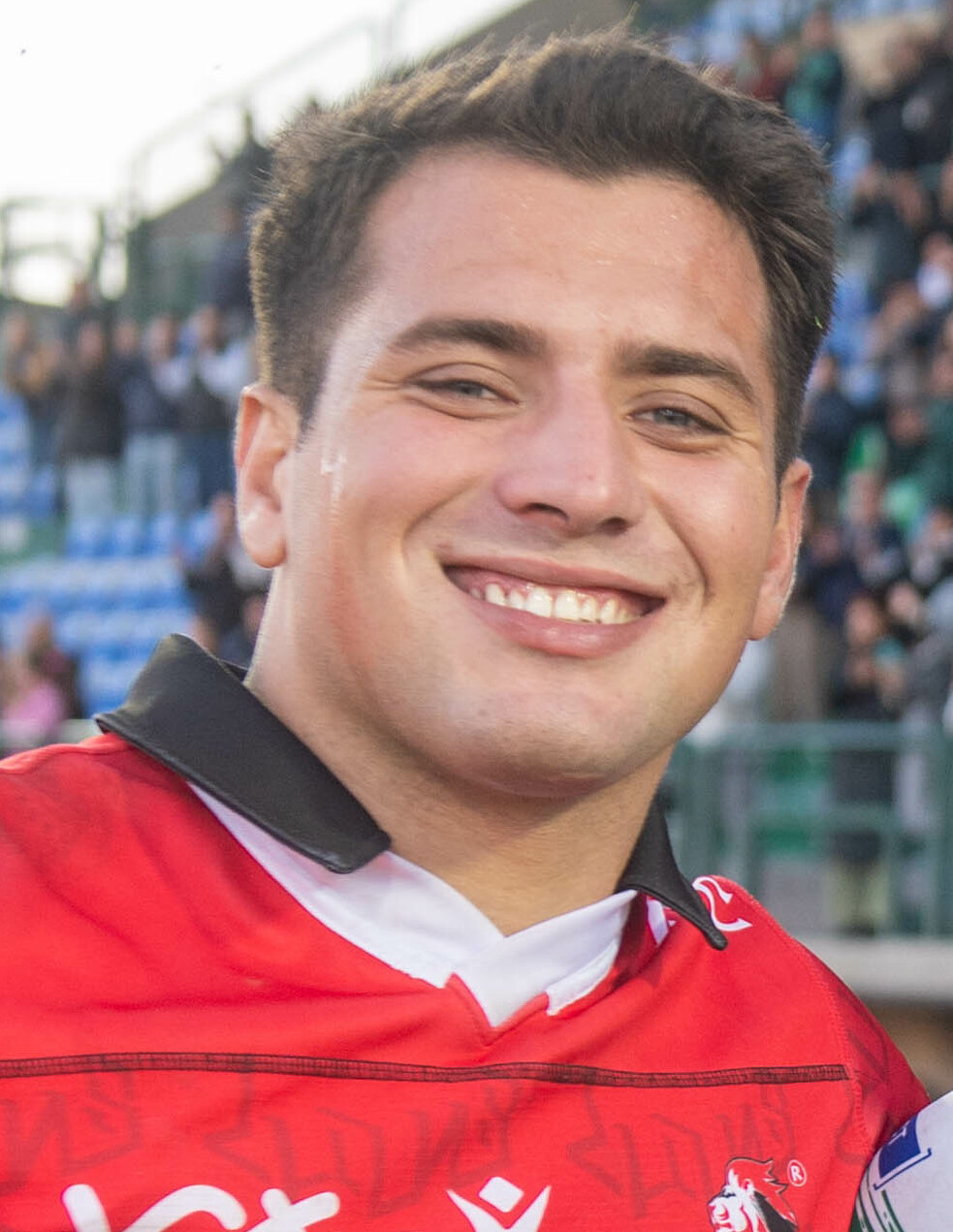
- Jonker in 2023
- Full name: Rynhardt Jonker
- Born: 18 April 2000 (age 26) Richards Bay, South Africa
- Height: 1.78 m (5 ft 10 in)
- Weight: 90 kg (14 st 2 lb; 198 lb)
- Notable relative: Marius Jonker (father)

Rugby union career
- Position: Centre
- Current team: Lions / Golden Lions
Senior career
Years	Team	Apps	(Points)
2019	Sharks XV	1	(0)
2021–2022	Sharks	1	(0)
2021	Sharks (Currie Cup)	0	(0)
2022	Griquas	14	(15)
2022–	Lions	35	(5)
2023–	Golden Lions	38	(35)
- Correct as of 26 October 2026

Rynhardt Jonker (born 18 April 2000) is a South African rugby union player for the Lions in the Currie Cup and Lions.His regular position is centre.

Jonker was named in the Sharks side for the 2021 Currie Cup Premier Division. He made his debut for the Sharks against the British & Irish Lions on 10 July in the 2021 British & Irish Lions tour to South Africa. Jonker was subsequently loaned out to the Griquas for the 2022 edition of the Carling Currie Cup.
