= Ruben Schoeman =

South African rugby union player

- Born: 14 March 1996 (age 30) Pretoria, South Africa
- Height: 1.98 m (6 ft 6 in)
- Weight: 123 kg (271 lb)
- School: Grey College, Bloemfontein
- University: University of the Free State

Rugby union career
- Position: Lock
- Current team: Lions / Golden Lions
Senior career
Years	Team	Apps	(Points)
2018	SWD Eagles	15	(30)
2019	Golden Lions XV	7	(15)
2019–2026	Golden Lions	40	(25)
2020–2026	Lions	75	(35)
- Correct as of 29 April 2026

Ruben Schoeman (born 14 March 1996) is a South African rugby union player for the Golden Lions in the Currie Cup and the Golden Lions XV in the Rugby Challenge. His regular position is lock.

He made his Currie Cup debut for the Golden Lions in July 2019, coming on as a replacement lock in their opening match of the 2019 season against the Pumas.
