= Kabelo Mokoena =

South African rugby union player

- Full name: Kabelo Mokoena
- Born: 5 May 2000 (age 26) Orlando, South Africa
- Height: 188 cm (6 ft 2 in)
- Weight: 94 kg (207 lb)
- School: SACS, Cape Town
- University: University of Pretoria

Rugby union career
- Position: Wing
- Current team: Bulls / Blue Bulls
Youth career
- 2019–2020: Blue Bulls
Senior career
Years	Team	Apps	(Points)
2021–	Blue Bulls	7	(0)
2021–	Bulls	0	(0)
- Correct as of 23 July 2022

Kabelo Mokoena (born 5 May 2000) is a South African rugby union player for the Blue Bulls in the Currie Cup. His regular position is wing.

Mokoena was named in the Blue Bulls side for their Round 7 match of the 2020–21 Currie Cup Premier Division against the Pumas. He made his debut in the same fixture, coming on as a replacement.
