= Werner Fourie =

South African rugby union player

- Full name: Werner Fourie
- Born: 28 July 1998 (age 28) South Africa
- Height: 1.75 m (5 ft 9 in)
- Weight: 100 kg (220 lb)

Rugby union career
- Position: Hooker
Senior career
Years	Team	Apps	(Points)
2019	Blue Bulls XV	7	(5)
2021	Blue Bulls	1	(0)
- Correct as of 13 January 2022

Werner Fourie (born 28 July 1998) is a South African rugby union player for the Blue Bulls in the Currie Cup. His regular position is hooker.

Fourie was named in the Blue Bulls squad for the 2021 Currie Cup Premier Division. He made his debut in Round 1 of the 2021 Currie Cup Premier Division against the Western Province.
