= Simon Miller (rugby union) =

South African rugby union player

- Full name: Simon Miller
- Born: 5 May 2001 (age 25) Pretoria, South Africa
- Height: 1.98 m (6 ft 6 in)
- Weight: 110 kg (243 lb)
- School: St. Alban's College
- University: Stellenbosch University

Rugby union career
- Position: Lock / Flanker
Senior career
Years	Team	Apps	(Points)
2021	Western Province	12	(0)
2021–2024	Stormers	1	(0)
2024	Sharks	1	(0)
2024–2026	Shizuoka Blue Revs	7	(0)
- Correct as of 16 September 2022
International career
Years	Team	Apps	(Points)
2019	South Africa U18	0	(0)

Simon Miller (born 5 May 2001) is a South African professional rugby union player who currently plays for the Shizuoka Blue Revs in the J1 League. His regular position is lock or flanker.

Miller was named in the Western Province squad for the 2021 Currie Cup Premier Division. He made his debut for them in Round 7 of the Currie Cup against the Pumas.He made his debut for the Stormers in 2023 against London Irish in England. Miller represented the SA Schools team in 2019 and went on to captain the u/21 Western Province side whilst studying at Stellenbosch University.
