= Robert Hunt (rugby union, born 1996) =

South African rugby union player

- Full name: Robert Hunt
- Born: 16 August 1996 (age 30) Hermanus, South Africa
- Height: 1.83 m (6 ft 0 in)
- Weight: 122 kg (269 lb)

Rugby union career
- Position: Prop
- Current team: Dragons RFC
Senior career
Years	Team	Apps	(Points)
2017–2019	Leopards	25	(10)
2021–2025	Bulls	15	(5)
2021–2025	Blue Bulls	8	(5)
2025-	Dragons RFC	14	(0)
- Correct as of 28th September 2026

Robert Hunt (born 16 August 1996) is a South African rugby union player for the Bulls in the United Rugby Championship and for the Blue Bulls in the Currie Cup. His regular position is tighthead prop.

Hunt was named in the Bulls squad for the 2021–22 United Rugby Championship. He made his debut in Round 3 of the 2021–22 United Rugby Championship against Cardiff.

== Honours ==
- United Rugby Championship runner-up 2021-22
