= Kade Wolhuter =

South African rugby union player

- Born: 28 June 2001 (age 25) Durban, South Africa
- Height: 1.82 m (5 ft 11 1/2 in)
- Weight: 85 kg (187 lb)
- School: Paul Roos Gymnasium

Rugby union career
- Position: Fly-half
- Current team: Lions / Golden Lions
Youth career
- 2018–2020: Montpellier
Senior career
| Years | Team | Apps | (Points) |
| 2020–2024 | Stormers | 5 | (30) |
| 2020–2024 | Western Province | 12 | (100) |
| 2024– | Lions | 9 | (68) |
| 2024– | Golden Lions | 8 | (54) |
- Correct as of 8 September 2025

Kade Wolhuter (born 28 June 2001) is a South African rugby union player for the Lions in Currie Cup. His regular position is fly-half.

Wolhuter was named in the Lions squad for the URC competition. He made his debut for the Lions in 2024 of URC clash against the Ospreys coming off the bench.
