= Zander du Plessis =

South African rugby union player

- Full name: Alex-Zander du Plessis
- Born: 8 April 2000 (age 26) South Africa
- Height: 1.90 m (6 ft 3 in)
- Weight: 97 kg (15 st 4 lb; 214 lb)
- School: Grey College, Bloemfontein
- University: University of Pretoria

Rugby union career
- Position: Fly-half / Centre / Fullback
- Current team: Lions / Griquas
Senior career
Years	Team	Apps	(Points)
2021–	Griquas	17	(95)
2022–	Lions	9	(2)
2024–	Golden Lions	7	(2)
- Correct as of 16 September 2024

Zander du Plessis (born 8 April 2000) is a South African rugby union player for the Griquas in the Currie Cup. His regular positions are fly-half, centre or fullback. Current Varsity Cup record holder scored most points in a season 157 points (TUKS -2021).

Du Plessis was named in the Griquas side for the 2022 Currie Cup Premier Division. He made his Currie Cup debut for the Griquas against the Free State Cheetahs in Round 1 of the 2022 Currie Cup Premier Division.
