= WJ Steenkamp =

South African rugby union player

- Full name: WJ Steenkamp
- Born: 28 September 2000 (age 26) South Africa
- Height: 190 cm (6 ft 3 in)
- Weight: 104 kg (229 lb)
- School: Grey College

Rugby union career
- Position: Flanker
- Current team: Bulls / Blue Bulls
Youth career
- 2018: Free State Cheetahs
Senior career
Years	Team	Apps	(Points)
2021–2024	Blue Bulls	12	(10)
2021–2024	Bulls	17	(10)
2024–	Lions	11	(5)
2025–	Golden Lions	9	(5)
- Correct as of 29 April 2026

WJ Steenkamp is a South African rugby union player for the Blue Bulls in the Currie Cup. His regular position is flanker.

Steenkamp was named in the Blue Bulls side for their Round 7 match of the 2020–21 Currie Cup Premier Division against the Pumas. He made his debut in the same fixture, starting the match at flanker.

== Honours ==
- Currie Cup winner 2021
- United Rugby Championship runner-up 2021-22
