= Stephan Smit =

South African rugby union player

- Full name: Stephan Smit
- Born: South Africa
- Height: 1.87 m (6 ft 1 1/2 in)
- Weight: 87 kg (192 lb; 13 st 10 lb)

Rugby union career
- Position: Flanker
- Current team: Lions / Griquas
Senior career
Years	Team	Apps	(Points)
2019	Blue Bulls XV	1	(0)
2022	Blue Bulls	1	(0)
2022–	Lions		
2023–	Griquas		
- Correct as of 23 July 2022

Stephan Smit is a South African rugby union player for the Blue Bulls in the Currie Cup. His regular position is flanker.

Smit was named in the Blue Bulls side for the 2022 Currie Cup Premier Division. He made his debut for the Blue Bulls in the semi-final of the 2022 Currie Cup Premier Division against the Griquas.
