= Hanru Sirgel =

South African rugby union player

- Full name: Hanru Sirgel
- Born: 8 May 1998 (age 28) South Africa
- Height: 1.9 m (6 ft 3 in)
- Weight: 103 kg (16 st 3 lb; 227 lb)

Rugby union career
- Position: Flanker
- Current team: Griquas
Senior career
| Years | Team | Apps | (Points) |
| 2018 | Blue Bulls XV | 0 | (0) |
| 2020–2021 | Pumas | 0 | (0) |
| 2021– | Griquas | 37 | (60) |
| 2023–2024 | Lions | 19 | (15) |
- Correct as of 18 June 2024

Hanru Sirgel (born 8 May 1998) is a South African rugby union player for the Griquas in the Currie Cup. His regular position is flanker.

Sirgel was named in the Griquas side for the 2021 Currie Cup Premier Division. He had previously been named in the Pumas squad for Super Rugby Unlocked and the 2020–21 Currie Cup Premier Division. He made his debut for the Griquas in Round 1 of the 2021 Currie Cup Premier Division against the Sharks.
