= Sango Xamlashe =

South African rugby union player

- Full name: Sango Xamlashe
- Born: 22 October 1998 (age 28) King William's Town, South Africa
- Height: 1.81 m (5 ft 11 1/2 in)
- Weight: 96 kg (212 lb)
- School: Selborne College
- University: University of Pretoria

Rugby union career
- Position: Centre
- Current team: Lions / Griquas
Youth career
- Border Bulldogs
Senior career
Years	Team	Apps	(Points)
2018	Free State XV	4	(5)
2021	Blue Bulls	1	(0)
2022–2024	Griquas	38	(25)
2024–	Pumas	12	(0)
- Correct as of 13 October 2025

Sango Xamlashe (born 22 October 1998) is a South African professional rugby union player for the Pumas in the Currie Cup. His regular position is centre.

Xamlashe was named in the Blue Bulls squad for the 2021 Currie Cup Premier Division. He made his debut in Round 1 of the 2021 Currie Cup Premier Division against the Western Province, captaining the side.
