= Johan Mulder =

South African rugby union player

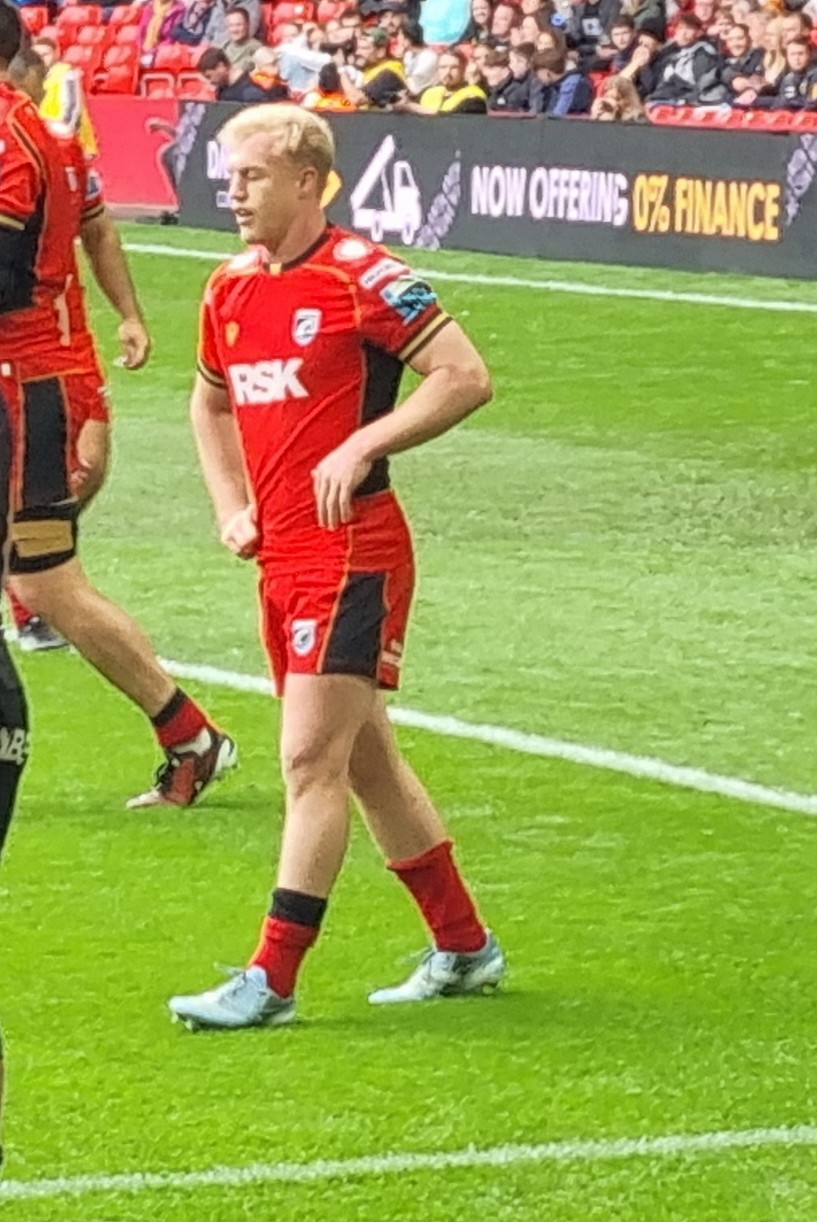
- Full name: Johan Mulder
- Born: South Africa
- Height: 1.78 m (5 ft 10 in)
- School: Afrikaanse Hoër Seunskool
- University: University of Pretoria

Rugby union career
- Position: Scrum-half
- Current team: Cardiff Rugby
Senior career
Years	Team	Apps	(Points)
2021	Blue Bulls	1	(0)
2022-	Griquas	25	(45)
2023-	Lions	2	(0)
2024-	Cardiff Rugby	0	(0)
- Correct as of 1 August 2024

Johan Mulder is a South African rugby union player for Cardiff Rugby in the United Rugby Championship. His regular position is scrum-half.

Mulder was named in the Blue Bulls squad for the 2021 Currie Cup Premier Division. He made his debut in Round 1 of the 2021 Currie Cup Premier Division against the Western Province.
