= 2025 Currie Cup Premier Division =

Domestic rugby union competition

- Countries: South Africa
- Date: 25 July – 20 September
- Champions: Griquas (4th title)
- Runners-up: Golden Lions
- Matches played: 31
- Tries scored: 250 (average 8.1 per match)
- Top point scorer: George Whitehead (Griquas, 64)
- Top try scorer: Donovan Don (Boland Cavaliers) 9 tries

The 2025 Currie Cup Premier Division was the 87th edition of the Currie Cup, the premier domestic rugby union competition in South Africa, and the oldest provincial rugby competition in the world. The competition was sponsored by beer brand Carling Black Label and organized by the South African Rugby Union.

The competition featured the four teams associated with the teams playing in the United Rugby Championship, as well as the four teams finishing top of the 2025 SA Cup. There was one change from the 2024 Currie Cup Premier Division, with the Boland Cavaliers qualifying for the first time since 2016.

== Teams ==
Team locations in the 2025 Currie Cup Premier Division

The eight competing teams are:

2025 Currie Cup Premier Division
Team	Sponsored name	Stadium	Sponsored stadia name	Capacity
Blue Bulls	Vodacom Blue Bulls	Loftus Versfeld, Pretoria; Tuine Sportklub	—N/a	51,762; 1,000
Boland Cavaliers	Sanlam Boland Kavaliers	Boland Stadium, Wellington	—N/a	12,000
Free State Cheetahs	Toyota Free State Cheetahs	Free State Stadium, Bloemfontein	Toyota Stadium	48,000
Golden Lions	Fidelity ADT Golden Lions	Ellis Park, Johannesburg	Emirates Airline Park	62,567
Griquas	Suzuki Griquas	Griqua Park, Kimberley	Suzuki Stadium	11,000
Pumas	Airlink Pumas	Mbombela Stadium, Mbombela; Nelspruit Rugby Club, Mbombela	—N/a	43,500; 5,000
Sharks	Hollywoodbets Sharks XV	Kings Park Stadium, Durban; Sugar Ray Xulu Stadium, Clermont; Woodburn Stadium, Pietermaritzburg	Hollywoodbets Kings Park; N/A; N/A	54,000; 6,500; 12,000
Western Province	DHL Western Province	Cape Town Stadium, Cape Town	DHL Stadium	55,000

== Regular season ==
=== Standings ===
2025 Currie Cup Premier Division standings
Pos	Team	Pld	W	D	L	PF	PA	PD	TF	TA	B	Pts	Qualification
1	Golden Lions	7	5	0	2	244	147	+97	36	22	6	26	Semifinals
2	Griquas	7	5	0	2	238	190	+48	35	27	5	25	Semifinals
3	Free State Cheetahs	7	4	0	3	203	197	+6	31	29	7	23	Semifinals
4	Boland Cavaliers	7	4	0	3	215	212	+3	30	31	7	23	Semifinals
5	Pumas	7	3	0	4	228	174	+54	31	23	9	21	
6	Blue Bulls	7	3	0	4	200	209	−9	29	29	3	15	
7	Sharks	7	3	0	4	108	208	−100	14	30	2	14	
8	Western Province	7	1	0	6	157	256	−99	21	36	2	6	

Source: SA Rugby

Tournament points in the standings were awarded to teams as follows:

- 4 points for a win.
- 2 points for a draw.
- 1 bonus point for a loss in a match by seven points or under.
- 1 bonus point for scoring four tries or more.

Teams were ranked in the standings by tournament points. Had two or more teams tied on points the tie would have been broken by: (a) points difference from all matches (points scored less points conceded); (b) tries difference from all matches (tries scored less tries conceded); (c) points difference from the matches between the tied teams; (d) points scored in all matches; (e) tries scored in all matches; and, if needed, (f) a coin toss.

== Fixtures ==
=== Round 1 ===
25 July 2025	Pumas (1 BP)	49–28	Griquas	Mbombela Stadium, Mbombela
19:00 SAST	Try: Xamlashe 3'; Visagie 15'; E. Swart 40+4'; Van Niekerk 52'; Scheepers 74'; Adonis 80+1'; Con: Visagie (5/6) 3', 40+4', 52', 74', 80+1; Pen: Visagie (3) 28', 34', 50'; Cards: Scheepers (yellow card) 76'	Report	Try: Erlank 12'; Whitehead 37'; Zwelendaba 71'; Con: Whitehead (2/3) 13', 37'; Pen: Whitehead (3) 2', 23', 25'; Cards: Abrahams (yellow card) 44'; Whitehead (yellow card) 46'; Wehr (yellow card) 54'	Referee: Marius van der Westhuizen

26 July 2025	Golden Lions (1 BP)	46–5	Sharks	Ellis Park, Johannesburg
15:00 SAST	Try: Cairns 10'; Maxwane (2) 22', 39'; Penalty try 34'; Davids 50'; Jonker 71'; L. Horn 74'; Con: Dobela (2/4) 40', 51'; Wolhuter (1/2) 75'; Pen: Dobela 43'	Report	Try: Sobahle 68'; Con: Smith (0/1); Cards: Sobahle (yellow card) 34'; Smith (yellow card) 45'	Referee: Dylen November

26 July 2025	Western Province	23–48	Blue Bulls (1 BP)	Cape Town Stadium, Cape Town
17:10 SAST	Try: S. van Wyk 14'; Skosan 48'; Con: Smith (2/2) 14', 49'; Pen: Smith (3) 7', 13', 38'; Cards: Davids (yellow card) 9'; Porter (yellow card) 27'; Groves (yellow card) 30'	Report	Try: Van Zyl 5'; Burger (2) 10', 39'; Manjezi 17'; Rudolph (2) 31', 64'; Con: Chamberlain (6/6) 6', 11', 18', 31', 40', 65'; Pen: Chamberlain (2) 40+2', 78'; Cards: Ch. Smit (yellow card) 36'	Attendance: 14,000; Referee: Sean Muller

27 July 2025	Boland Cavaliers (1 BP)	37–35	Free State Cheetahs (2 BP)	Boland Stadium, Wellington
15:00 SAST	Try: Davids (2) 16', 34'; Brits 32'; Titus 80'; Don 80+8'; Con: Tedder (3/3) 17', 33', 35'; Mostert (0/2); Pen: Tedder (2) 6', 12'	Report	Try: Janse van Rensburg 21'; Kruger 26'; C. Coetzee 58'; G. van der Merwe 64'; Paulo 74'; Con: Jasper (2/2) 22', 27'; Makhaza (3/3) 59', 65', 75'; Cards: G. van der Merwe (yellow card) 30'; Paulo (yellow card) 79'	Referee: Stephan Geldenhuys

=== Round 2 ===
1 August 2025	Free State Cheetahs (1 BP)	42–25	Pumas (1 BP)	Free State Stadium, Bloemfontein
19:00 SAST	Try: Ja. Nel (4) 18', 23', 29', 78'; Volschenk 40+5'; C. Coetzee 48'; Con: Swanepoel (5/5) 19', 24', 30', 40+6', 49'; Jasper (1/1) 79'	Report	Try: Braude (2) 15', 32'; Xamlashe 54'; Van Niekerk 76'; Con: Visagie (1/4) 77'; Pen: Visagie 21'	Referee: Hanru van Rooyen

2 August 2025	Golden Lions (1 BP)	40–19	Western Province	Ellis Park, Johannesburg
15:00 SAST	Try: Dobela 6'; Penalty try 16'; Maxwane 23'; Steenkamp 48'; Visagie (2) 63', 68'; Con: Dobela (4/5) 7', 24', 49', 64'; Cards: Steyn (yellow card) 35'	Report	Try: Nel (2) 6', 53'; G. van Wyk 37'; Con: Smith (2/3) 38', 54'; Cards: Sithole (yellow card) 16'	Referee: Christopher Allison

2 August 2025	Blue Bulls (1 BP)	64–0	Sharks	Loftus Versfeld Stadium, Pretoria
17:10 SAST	Try: Else (2) 3', 36'; D. Smith 10'; Ch. Smit (2) 27', 33'; Rudolph (2) 43', 52'; Jacobs 48'; Co. Smit 57'; J. Theron 64'; Con: Chamberlain (7/10) 4', 11', 28', 33', 37', 49', 53'	Report		Referee: Sean Muller

3 August 2025	Griquas (1 BP)	48–39	Boland Cavaliers (1 BP)	Griqua Park, Kimberley
15:00 SAST	Try: Maart 6'; Oosthuizen 17'; Wehr (2) 30', 51'; Abrahams (2) 45', 47'; Lange 69'; Pretorius 76'; Con: Whitehead (4/8) 18', 31', 48', 77'	Report	Try: Nxele 11'; Brits 32'; Don (3) 35', 40', 59'; Titus 37'; Con: Tedder (3/6) 12', 38', 40+1'; Pen: Tedder 20'	Referee: AJ Jacobs

=== Round 3 ===
8 August 2025	Griquas (1 BP)	47–17	Western Province	Griqua Park, Kimberley
15:00 SAST	Try: Liebenberg 12'; Bester 18'; Abrahams 33'; Wehr 48'; Pretorius 68'; Els 77'; Bursey 79'; Con: Whitehead (6/7) 13', 19', 34', 49', 69', 80'	Report	Try: Da Costa 21'; Ntubeni 63'; Ngobeni 74'; Con: Matthee (1/3) 22'	Referee: Cwengile Jadezweni

9 August 2025	Blue Bulls	7–41	Pumas (1 BP)	Loftus Versfeld, Pretoria
15:00 SAST	Try: Bam 29'; Con: Chamberlain (1/1) 30'	Report	Try: E. Swart 38'; Engelbrecht 45'; De Klerk 51'; Braude 63'; Theunissen 77'; Fouché 80'; Con: Visagie (4/6) 38', 46', 64', 80+1'; Pen: Visagie 22'	Referee: Morné Ferreira

9 August 2025	Sharks (1 BP)	5–7	Free State Cheetahs	Sugar Ray Xulu Stadium, Clermont
17:10 SAST	Try: Ganyane 66'; Con: Smith (0/1); Cards: Rahl (yellow card) 15'	Report	Try: Volschenk 15'; Con: Makhaza (1/1) 16'	Referee: AJ Jacobs

10 August 2025	Boland Cavaliers (1 BP)	29–10	Golden Lions	Boland Stadium,Wellington
15:00 SAST	Try: Don (2) 9', 32'; Mitchell 67'; Mostert 80+5'; Con: Tedder (3/4) 33', 68', 80+6'; Pen: Tedder 27'; Cards: Nxele (yellow card) 4'; Tedder (yellow card) 47'	Report	Try: Wolhuter 19'; G. Lombard 59'; Con: Wolhuter (0/2); Cards: Steyn (yellow card) 35'	Referee: Marius van der Westhuizen

=== Round 4 ===
15 August 2025	Griquas (1 BP)	26–17	Sharks	Griqua Park, Kimberley
15:00 SAST	Try: Abrahams 20'; Oosthuizen 55'; Maart 61'; Hufke 75'; Con: Whitehead (3/4) 21', 62', 75'; Cards: Oosthuizen (yellow card) 59'	Report	Try: Everson 33'; Appollis 59'; Con: Moyo (2/2) 34', 60'; Pen: Moyo 15'; Cards: Hatton (yellow card) 19'; Romao (yellow card) 54'; Smith (yellow card) 73'	Referee: Griffin Colby

16 August 2025	Free State Cheetahs (1 BP)	31–24	Western Province (1 BP)	Free State Stadium, Bloemfontein
14:00 SAST	Try: Jasper 9'; Mosi 24'; Britz 44'; Venter 48'; Volschenk 56'; Con: Jasper (3/5) 10', 49', 57'; Cards: M. Jansen van Vuren (yellow card) 33' (yellow-red card) 73'; Janse van Rensburg (yellow card) 75'	Report	Try: S. van Wyk 37'; Africa 65'; Ndiao 71'; Con: Matthee (1/1) 37'; Leyds (2/2) 66', 72'; Pen: Matthee 16'	Referee: Stephan Geldenhuys

16 August 2025	Pumas (2 BP)	35–36	Golden Lions (1 BP)	Nelspruit Rugby Club, Mbombela
14:00 SAST	Try: Van der Merwe 12'; Braude 18'; Adonis 26'; Campher 73'; Ti. Pretorius 80+5'; Con: Visagie (5/5) 13', 19', 27', 74', 80+6'	Report	Try: Mpeku 15'; Davids 22'; R. du Plessis (2) 32', 60'; Sjoblom 49'; Con: Dobela (4/5) 16', 23', 33', 50'; Pen: Dobela 46'	Referee: Christopher Allison

17 August 2025	Boland Cavaliers (1 BP)	28–20	Blue Bulls	Boland Stadium, Wellington
15:00 SAST	Try: Tobias 40'; Don 47'; Mafu 61'; Van der Westhuizen 72'; Con: Davids (4/4) 40+1', 48', 62', 73'; Cards: D. Booysen (yellow card) 13'; Schreuder (yellow card) 49'; Benadie (yellow card) 51'; Masimla (yellow card) 78'	Report	Try: J. Erasmus 14'; Ja. Grobbelaar 32'; Xaba 53'; Con: Chamberlain (1/2) 33'; Van der Walt (0/1); Pen: Chamberlain 45'; Cards: Co. Smit (yellow card) 55'; Mnebelele (yellow card) 67'	Attendance: 11,000; Referee: Robbie Jenkinson

=== Round 5 ===
22 August 2025	Pumas (2 BP)	26–29	Boland Cavaliers (1 BP)	Mbombela Stadium, Mbombela
17:00 SAST	Try: Braude (2) 10', 19'; E. Swart (2) 16', 47'; Con: Visagie (3/4) 11', 17', 20'; Cards: Adonis (yellow card) 77'	Report	Try: Titus 51'; Mitchell 60'; Van der Westhuizen 67'; Penalty try 78'; Con: Tedder (2/3) 61', 68'; Pen: Tedder 7'; Cards: Mafu (yellow card) 9'; Tedder (yellow card) 15'	Referee: Cwengile Jadezweni

22 August 2025	Sharks (1 BP)	29–21	Western Province	Kings Park Stadium, Durban
19:10 SAST	Try: Sobahle 30'; J. Williams 40+1'; Mazibuko 44'; Hlekani 62'; Con: Smith (3/4) 40+2', 45', 63'; Pen: Smith 73'	Report	Try: De Villiers 21'; Ngobeni 26'; B. Venter 67'; Con: Smith (2/2) 22', 27'; Brown (1/1) 68'	Referee: Robbie Jenkinson

23 August 2025	Free State Cheetahs (1 BP)	47–31	Golden Lions (1 BP)	Free State Stadium, Bloemfontein
14:00 SAST	Try: Janse van Rensburg (2) 4', 11'; Nkabinde 17'; Blommetjies 34'; Annies 31'; Penalty try 70'; Ja. Nel 77'; Con: Jasper (2/3) 5', 18'; Blommetjies (3/3) 34', 50', 78'; Cards: Smith (yellow card) 66'	Report	Try: G. Lombard 36'; Brandon 45'; Davids 54'; Steyn 59'; Jonker 63'; Con: Francis (3/5) 45', 55', 59'; Cards: Dobela (yellow card) 3'; Ru. Schoeman (yellow card) 31'; G. Lombard (yellow card) 70'	Referee: Dylen November

24 August 2025	Blue Bulls	21–42	Griquas (1 BP)	Tuine Sport Klub, Pretoria
15:00 SAST	Try: Jacobs 6'; Pokomela 76'; Letebele 80+2'; Con: Chamberlain (3/3) 6', 76', 80+2'; Cards: Xaba (yellow card) 41'	Report	Try: Wehr (3) 12', 15', 42'; Dlamini 24'; Uys 45'; Bester 70'; Con: Whitehead (6/6) 13', 16', 25', 43', 46', 71'; Cards: Prinsloo (red card) 73'	Referee: AJ Jacobs

=== Round 6 ===
29 August 2025	Free State Cheetahs	10–40	Griquas (1 BP)	Free State Stadium, Bloemfontein
17:00 SAST	Try: Janse van Rensburg 26'; Maartens 72'; Con: Jasper (0/2)	Report	Try: Whitehead 3'; Bester 6'; Abrahams 15'; Wehr (2) 29', 63'; Hufke 40'; Con: Whitehead (5/6) 4', 7', 16', 30', 64'; Cards: Lyons (yellow card) 67'; Abrahams (yellow card) 71'; Liebenberg (yellow card) 71'	Referee: Christopher Allison

30 August 2025	(1 BP) Golden Lions	44–5	Blue Bulls	Ellis Park, Johannesburg
15:00 SAST	Try: C. Smith 14'; Kotze 27'; Botha 47'; Kriel 68'; Francis 71'; Pead 80+2'; Con: C. Smith (2/4) 15', 27'; Francis (1/1) 72'; Kriel (1/1) 80+3'; Pen: C. Smith (2) 2', 21'; Cards: R. Venter (yellow card) 66'	Report	Try: Van der Walt 16'; Con: Chamberlain (0/1); Cards: Matanzima (yellow card) 45'; Co. Smit (yellow card) 65'; Ferreira (yellow card) 73'	Referee: Sean Muller

30 August 2025	Sharks	33–31	Boland Cavaliers (2 BP)	Woodburn Stadium, Pietermaritzburg
17:10 SAST	Try: Marais (2) 25', 56'; A. Bester 30'; Con: Smith (3/3) 26', 31', 57'; Pen: Smith (3) 37', 47', 66'; Masuku 80+6'; Cards: Le Roux (yellow card) 33'; Fourie (yellow card) 76'	Report	Try: Arendse 33'; Don 50'; Van der Westhuizen 61'; Van Schoor 72'; Con: Tedder (4/4) 34', 50', 62', 72'; Pen: Tedder 78'; Cards: Schreuder (yellow card) 2'; Nxele (yellow card) 45'	Referee: Dylen November

30 August 2025	Western Province	13–39	Pumas (1 BP)	Cape Town Stadium, Cape Town
19:20 SAST	Try: Evans 1'; Con: Smith (1/1) 2'; Pen: Smith (2) 26', 55'	Report	Try: Fouché 38'; De Klerk 46'; Xamlashe 50'; Adonis 69'; Banda 79'; Con: C. Swart (4/5) 39', 51', 70', 80'; Pen: C. Swart (2) 43', 64'	Referee: Stephan Geldenhuys

=== Round 7 ===
5 September 2025	Sharks	19–13	Pumas (1 BP)	Kings Park Stadium, Durban
19:00 SAST	Try: Penxe 46'; Buthelezi 59'; F. Venter 69'; Con: Masuku (2/3) 60', 70'	Report	Try: Msenge 64'; Con: C. Swart (1/1) 65'; Pen: C. Swart (2) 19', 24'; Cards: E. Swart (yellow card) 13'	Referee: Griffin Colby

6 September 2025	Western Province (1 BP)	40–22	Boland Cavaliers	Cape Town Stadium, Cape Town
14:45 SAST	Try: Matongo 24'; A. Smith (2) 44', 62'; Zas 48'; Roche 53'; Theunissen 70'; Con: Matthee (5/6) 25', 44', 54', 62', 70'; Cards: Eloff (yellow card) 73'	Report	Try: Van der Westhuizen 18'; Don 66'; Classen 74'; Con: Bantom (1/1) 66'; Lambrecht (1/1) 75'; Mostert (0/1); Pen: Mostert 30'; Cards: Arendse (yellow card) 24'; Van der Westhuizen (yellow card) 43'; Bantom (yellow card) 69'	Referee: Morné Ferreira

6 September 2025	Golden Lions (1 BP)	37–7	Griquas	Ellis Park, Johannesburg
17:00 SAST	Try: Van Wyk 23'; Kriel 27'; Steyn 50'; Davids 57'; Q. Horn 65'; Con: C. Smith (3/5) 24', 50', 66'; Pen: C. Smith (2) 39', 55'	Report	Try: Oosthuizen 5'; Con: Whitehead (1/1) 6'; Cards: Zwelendaba (yellow card) 38'	Referee: Cwengile Jadezweni

6 September 2025	Blue Bulls (1 BP)	35–31	Free State Cheetahs (2 BP)	Loftus Versfeld, Pretoria
19:05 SAST	Try: Coetzee 3'; Jooste (2) 10', 42'; Gumede 30'; Kriel 38'; Con: Johannes (5/5) 4', 10', 30', 38', 43'; Cards: Coetzee (red card) 51'	Report	Try: Coetzee 16'; Ja. Nel 61'; Nkabinde 67'; Paulo 72'; P. Uys 79'; Con: Jasper (3/5) 62', 67', 79'; Cards: P. Uys (yellow card) 32'	Referee: Hanru van Rooyen

=== Semi Finals ===
13 September 2025	Golden Lions	67–19	Boland Cavaliers	Ellis Park, Johannesburg
17:00 SAST	Try: Davids (4) 3', 13', 37', 55'; Van Wyk (2) 20', 23'; Kotze 30'; Penalty try 42'; Q. Horn 70'; Du Plessis 80'; Con: Smith (6/10) 14', 21', 24', 31', 70', 80+1'; Pen: Smith 9'	Report	Try: Tobias 33'; Bantom 67'; September 73'; Con: Mostert (1/1) 67'; Tedder (1/2) 73'; Cards: Tedder (yellow card) 42'	Referee: Griffin Colby

13 September 2025	Griquas	25–5	Free State Cheetahs	Griqua Park, Kimberley
19:15 SAST	Try: Liebenberg 7'; Maart (2) 9', 56'; Con: Whitehead (2/3) 8', 57'; Pen: Whitehead (2) 41', 80+1'	Report	Try: Nkabinde 13'; Con: Jasper (0/1)	Referee: Stephan Geldenhuys

=== Final ===
20 September 2025	Golden Lions	25–27	Griquas	Ellis Park, Johannesburg
15:00 SAST	Try: Mpeku 24'; Kriel 35'; Van Wyk 46'; Con: Smith (2/3) 25', 36'; Pen: Smith 21'; Dobela 79'	Report	Try: Hufke 2'; Oosthuizen 29'; Zwelendaba 73'; Con: Whitehead (3/3) 3', 30', 74'; Pen: Whitehead (2) 45', 80+3'	Attendance: 12,501; Referee: Christopher Allison

Golden Lions	Griquas

Golden Lions:
FB	15	Quan Horn (c)
RW	14	Kelly Mpeku
OC	13	Henco van Wyk
IC	12	Richard Kriel	(substituted off) 75'
LW	11	Angelo Davids
FH	10	Chris Smith	(substituted off) 43'
SH	9	Nico Steyn
N8	8	WJ Steenkamp	(substituted off) 65'
BF	7	Ruan Venter
OF	6	Jarod Cairns
RL	5	Ruan Delport
LL	4	Dylan Sjoblom	(substituted off) 52'
TP	3	Asenathi Ntlabakanye	(substituted off) 50'
HK	2	Franco Marais	(substituted off) 50'
LP	1	SJ Kotze	(substituted off) 69'
Substitutes:
HK	16	Morné Brandon	(substituted on) 50'
PR	17	Juan Schoeman	(substituted on) 69'
PR	18	RF Schoeman	(substituted on) 50'
LK	19	Darrien Landsberg	(substituted on) 52'
BR	20	Renzo du Plessis	(substituted on) 65'
SH	21	Haashim Pead
FH	22	Lubabalo Dobela	(substituted on) 43'
CE	23	Rynhardt Jonker	(substituted on) 75'
Coach:
Mzwakhe Nkosi & Ivan van Rooyen

Griquas:
FB	15	Cameron Hufke
RW	14	Dylan Maart
OC	13	Zane Bester
IC	12	Mnombo Zwelendaba	(substituted off) 74'
LW	11	Gurshwin Wehr
FH	10	George Whitehead
SH	9	Caleb Abrahams	(substituted off) 75'
N8	8	Gustav Erlank
BF	7	Carl Els	(substituted off) 7'
OF	6	Lourens Oosthuizen	(substituted off) 77'
RL	5	Albert Liebenberg
LL	4	Derik Pretorius
TP	3	Cebo Dlamini (c)	(substituted off) 49'
HK	2	Janco Uys	(substituted off) 49'
LP	1	Edward Davids	(substituted off) 62'
Substitutes:
HK	16	Tiaan Lange	(substituted on) 49'
PR	17	Leon Lyons	(substituted on) 62'
PR	18	Ig Prinsloo	(substituted on) 49'
BR	19	Marco de Witt	(substituted on) 7'
BR	20	Phumzile Maqondwana	(substituted on) 77'
SH	21	Thomas Bursey	(substituted on) 75'
CE	22	Tom Nel	(substituted on) 74'
FB	23	Connor Mahoney
Coach:
Pieter Bergh

Assistant Referees:
Cwengile Jadezweni
Stephan Geldenhuys
Television match official:
Egon Seconds
Split Screen/FPRO:
Jonathan Lottering

== See also ==
- 2025 Currie Cup First Division
- 2025 SA Cup
