= List of Currie Cup Premier Division players (2020–present) =

This is a list of rugby union footballers who have competed in the Currie Cup Premier Division since 2020. The Bulls XV (formerly as the Blue Bulls), Cheetahs (formerly as the Free State Cheetahs), Griquas, Lions (formerly as the Golden Lions), Pumas, Sharks XV (formerly as the Sharks) and Stormers XXIII (formerly as the Western Province) have taken part in every Currie Cup Premier Division since 2020, while the Griffons took part in the 2023 and 2024 additions. The Boland Cavaliers made their first Premier Division appearance since 2016 in the 2025 edition and will compete again in 2026.

== A ==
- Caleb Abrahams: Griquas (2025–2026)
- Thaakir Abrahams: Sharks XV (2021–2023)
- De-An Ackermann: Pumas (2024), Cheetahs (2026)
- Ethan Adams: Lions (2026)
- Darren Adonis: Pumas (2024–2026)
- Lourens Adriaanse: Sharks XV (2021–2022)
- Jared Africa: Stormers XXIII (2024–2025)
- Tim Agaba: Bulls XV (2020/21)
- JP Alberts: Bulls XV (2023)
- Willem Alberts: Lions (2020/21–2021)
- Bobby Alexander: Stormers XXIII (2022), Griquas (2023–2026)
- Jason Alexander: Stormers XXIII (2021), Sharks XV (2022–2023)
- Lukhanyo Am: Sharks XV (2020/21)
- Chinedu Amadi: Bulls XV (2026)
- Michael Amiras: Griquas (2022–2023)
- Hyron Andrews: Sharks XV (2020/21–2023)
- Michael Annies: Cheetahs (2024–2026)
- Gio Aplon: Bulls XV (2021)
- Diego Appollis: Bulls XV (2022), Pumas (2022–2023), Sharks XV (2024–2025)
- Ederies Arendse: Griquas (2020/21–2021)
- Cheslin Arendse: Griffons (2024)
- Kurt-Lee Arendse: Bulls XV (2020/21–2023)
- Sauleigh Arendse: Boland Cavaliers (2025–2026)
- Wilmar Arnoldi: Cheetahs (2020/21–2022)
- Juarno Augustus: Stormers XXIII (2020/21–2021)

== B ==
- Heath Backhouse: Pumas (2020/21)
- Casper Badenhorst: Bulls XV (2025)
- Damian Baker: Bulls XV (2026)
- Luca Bakkes: Stormers XXIII (2025)
- Riyaad Bam: Bulls XV (2025–2026)
- Junior Banda: Griquas (2023), Pumas (2025–2026)
- Masixole Banda: Griquas (2021)
- Jayden Bantom: Boland Cavaliers (2025–2026)
- Meno Barnard: Sharks XV (2024–2026)
- Ockie Barnard: Cheetahs (2022), Sharks XV (2023)
- Thomas Barnard: Stormers XXIII (2026)
- Craig Barry: Cheetahs (2021–2022)
- Eric Basson: Bulls XV (2022), Stormers XXIII (2026)
- Justin Basson: Stormers XXIII (2021)
- Andrew Beerwinkel: Griquas (2020/21–2021)
- Corné Beets: Bulls XV (2024)
- Thomas Beling: Bulls XV (2026)
- Michael Benadie: Griffons (2023), Boland Cavaliers (2025–2026)
- Rynier Bernardo: Cheetahs (2021–2023)
- Heinz Bertram: Pumas (2025)
- Albie Bester: Sharks XV (2025–2026)
- Ethan Bester: Sharks XV (2024)
- Lili Bester: Sharks XV (2024–2025)
- Zane Bester: Griquas (2024–2026)
- Henco Beukes: Bulls XV (2021), Griquas (2021)
- Niel Beukes: Bulls XV (2021–2022)
- Christo Bezuidenhout Jnr.: Pumas (2021)
- Jaco Bezuidenhout: Bulls XV (2021)
- Kabous Bezuidenhout: Lions (2022–2023), Sharks XV (2024)
- Thembelani Bholi: Sharks XV (2020/21–2023)
- Thando Biyela: Lions (2026)
- Dian Bleuler: Stormers XXIII (2021), Sharks XV (2022–2025)
- Clayton Blommetjies: Cheetahs (2020/21–2022, 2025–2026), Stormers XXIII (2023–2024)
- Dalvon Blood: Pumas (2025–2026)
- Kwenzo Blose: Stormers XXIII (2020/21–2023)
- Tyler Bocks: Lions (2022–2023)
- Joaquín Díaz Bonilla: Sharks XV (2022)
- Doctor Booysen: Griffons (2023), Boland Cavaliers (2025)
- Taine Booysen: Boland Cavaliers (2026)
- Zinedine Booysen: Cheetahs (2021–2023)
- Aka Boqwana: Bulls XV (2026)
- Curwin Bosch: Sharks XV (2020/21–2023)
- Evardi Boshoff: Cheetahs (2021–2024)
- Theo Boshoff: Pumas (2020/21), Griquas (2021–2022)
- Tiaan Botes: Pumas (2020/21)
- Arno Botha: Bulls XV (2020/21–2022)
- Danio Botha: Sharks XV (2026)
- Dolph Botha: Cheetahs (2023)
- Janu Botha: Griquas (2021–2024)
- Lesley Botha: Cheetahs (2021)
- Luan Botha: Stormers XXIII (2026)
- PJ Botha: Lions (2021–2025)
- Josh Boulle: Stormers XXIII (2024–2026)
- Morné Brandon: Lions (2021–2025)
- Enver Brandt: Griquas (2020/21–2021), Cheetahs (2022)
- Ross Braude: Pumas (2024–2025), Sharks XV (2026)
- Cyle Brink: Bulls XV (2022–2024)
- David Brits: Cheetahs (2021–2023), Pumas (2024), Boland Cavaliers (2025–2026)
- Banie Britz: Cheetahs (2025), Pumas (2026)
- Ronald Brown: Stormers XXIII (2025)
- Ebot Buma: Lions (2022)
- David Bunduki: Griffons (2024)
- Jandre Burger: Bulls XV (2021)
- Luke Burger: Stormers XXIII (2023–2026)
- Zak Burger: Griquas (2020/21), Bulls XV (2021–2025)
- Thomas Bursey: Stormers XXIII (2021–2023), Griquas (2024–2025), Pumas (2026)
- Phepsi Buthelezi: Sharks XV (2020/21–2025)

== C ==
- Jarod Cairns: Lions (2022–2026)
- Bryce Calvert: Sharks XV (2024–2026)
- Jan-Henning Campher: Lions (2020/21), Pumas (2024–2026)
- Luke Cannon: Lions (2026)
- Nizaam Carr: Bulls XV (2020/21–2026)
- Mitchell Carstens: Griffons (2023)
- Jordan Chait: Sharks XV (2022)
- Boeta Chamberlain: Sharks XV (2021–2022), Bulls XV (2024–2025)
- Zian Cilliers: Lions (2026)
- Jurich Claasens: Lions (2022–2023)
- Llewellyn Classen: Bulls XV (2021), Pumas (2021–2024), Boland Cavaliers (2025–2026)
- Matthew Coenraad: Stormers XXIII (2023)
- Andries Coetzee: Lions (2023)
- Aranos Coetzee: Cheetahs (2021–2026)
- Carel-Jan Coetzee: Griffons (2023), Cheetahs (2024–2026)
- Dian Coetzee: Bulls XV (2026)
- Ewan Coetzee: Griquas (2020/21)
- Jaco Coetzee: Stormers XXIII (2020/21)
- Marcell Coetzee: Bulls XV (2021–2025)
- Marné Coetzee: Pumas (2021), Cheetahs (2022)
- Matthew Coetzee: Lions (2026)
- Stefan Coetzee: Pumas (2023–2025), Griquas (2026)
- Armand Combrinck: Lions (2026)
- Ruan Combrinck: Bulls XV (2021)
- CJ Conradie: Griquas (2020/21)
- Louis Conradie: Bulls XV (2021)
- Ed Coulson: Stormers XXIII (2023)
- Erich Cronjé: Pumas (2020/21–2021), Lions (2024)
- George Cronjé: Cheetahs (2020/21–2023)
- Lionel Cronjé: Sharks XV (2021–2024)
- Ross Cronjé: Lions (2020/21–2021)
- Aidynn Cupido: Lions (2021–2022)
- Gino Cupido: Stormers XXIII (2024–2026)
- Kyle Cyster: Griffons (2024)

== D ==
- Aden da Costa: Stormers XXIII (2025)
- Luyolo Dapula: Griquas (2021–2022)
- Angelo Davids: Stormers XXIII (2020/21–2024), Lions (2025)
- Ashlon Davids: Griquas (2020/21–2023), Boland Cavaliers (2025–2026)
- Bradley Davids: Sharks XV (2022–2025)
- Eddie Davids: Griquas (2022–2026)
- Zain Davids: Sharks XV (2020/21), Stormers XXIII (2025)
- Aidon Davis: Cheetahs (2020/21–2024)
- Kian Davis: Stormers XXIII (2026)
- Cameron Dawson: Cheetahs (2020/21–2025), Pumas (2024), Sharks XV (2026)
- Hacjivah Dayimani: Stormers XXIII (2021–2023)
- Dandrè Delport: Cheetahs (2022), Griffons (2023), Griquas (2024)
- Ruan Delport: Bulls XV (2022), Lions (2023–2026)
- Troy Delport: Pumas (2026)
- Jandre de Beer: Griffons (2023–2024)
- Tinus de Beer: Griquas (2020/21–2021), Pumas (2022–2023)
- Stian de Bruyn: Lions (2025)
- Ruben de Haas: Cheetahs (2020/21–2024)
- Erich de Jager: Cheetahs (2020/21), Griquas (2021)
- Stephan de Jager: Griffons (2023), Pumas (2024–2025)
- Juan de Jongh: Stormers XXIII (2021–2023)
- Faf de Klerk: Cheetahs (2026)
- Sebastian de Klerk: Pumas (2020/21–2023)
- Tiaan de Klerk: Bulls XV (2021), Pumas (2025–2026)
- Branden de Kock: Cheetahs (2021–2023)
- Dylan de Leeuw: Stormers XXIII (2023, 2026), Bulls XV (2025)
- Paul de Villiers: Stormers XXIII (2023–2025)
- Adam de Waal: Stormers XXIII (2025)
- Paul de Wet: Stormers XXIII (2020/21–2024), Bulls XV (2025)
- Marco de Witt: Sharks XV (2023), Griquas (2024–2026)
- Kwanda Dimaza: Pumas (2021–2025), Boland Cavaliers (2026)
- Ben-Jason Dixon: Stormers XXIII (2022–2024)
- Cebo Dlamini: Bulls XV (2022), Griquas (2023–2025)
- Gift Dlamini: Boland Cavaliers (2025–2026)
- Mhleli Dlamini: Bulls XV (2021)
- Lucky Dlepu: Sharks XV (2021), Pumas (2022)
- Simon Dionisio: Lions (2022)
- Lubabalo Dobela: Griquas (2023–2024), Lions (2025)
- Donavan Don: Boland Cavaliers (2025)
- Dewald Donald: Bulls XV (2021)
- Frankie Dos Reis: Cheetahs (2025–2026)
- Ruan Dreyer: Lions (2020/21–2023), Sharks XV (2024)
- Jean Droste: Cheetahs (2021–2023)
- Kudzwai Dube: Griquas (2022–2023), Pumas (2026)
- Siya Dube: Lions (2026)
- Dewaldt Duvenage: Stormers XXIII (2024–2025)
- Bismarck du Plessis: Bulls XV (2022–2023)
- Dan du Plessis: Stormers XXIII (2020/21–2024)
- FC du Plessis: Bulls XV (2021–2022)
- Jacques du Plessis: Bulls XV (2021–2023)
- Jannie du Plessis: Lions (2020/21–2022)
- Jean-Luc du Plessis: Stormers XXIII (2023–2026)
- Muller du Plessis: Sharks XV (2024)
- Renzo du Plessis: Lions (2023–2026)
- Zander du Plessis: Griquas (2022–2023), Lions (2024), Cheetahs (2026)
- Gustav du Rand: Griquas (2022–2025), Pumas (2026)
- Jaco du Toit: Sharks XV (2026)
- Jacque-Louis du Toit: Lions (2022–2024)
- Jacques du Toit: Cheetahs (2020/21)
- Johan du Toit: Stormers XXIII (2020/21–2021)
- Thomas du Toit: Sharks XV (2020/21–2021)
- Joseph Dweba: Stormers XXIII (2024)
- Aphiwe Dyantyi: Bulls XV (2024–2025)
- Thomas Dyer: Sharks XV (2025–2026)

== E ==
- Robert Ebersohn: Cheetahs (2021–2023)
- Paschal Ekeji: Stormers XXIII (2022), Sharks XV (2025)
- Cabous Eloff: Stormers XXIII (2025)
- Jonathan Eloff: Bulls XV (2026)
- Carl Els: Griquas (2020/21–2026)
- Corniel Els: Bulls XV (2020/21)
- Juann Else: Bulls XV (2024–2025)
- Cornell Engelbrecht: Boland Cavaliers (2026)
- Willie Engelbrecht: Pumas (2020/21–2022, 2025–2026), Stormers XXIII (2023–2024)
- Ruan Enslin: Bulls XV (2026)
- Joshua Eras: Boland Cavaliers (2026)
- Demitre Erasmus: Bulls XV (2025–2026)
- Jean Erasmus: Bulls XV (2025–2026)
- Schalk Erasmus: Bulls XV (2020/21–2022)
- Gustav Erlank: Griquas (2024–2025)
- André Esterhuizen: Sharks XV (2024)
- Izan Esterhuizen: Lions (2022–2025)
- Connor Evans: Stormers XXIII (2022–2025)
- Ceano Everson: Sharks XV (2025–2026)
- Charlie Ewels: Bulls XV (2023)
- Dave Ewers: Stormers XXIII (2024)

== F ==
- Aphelele Fassi: Sharks XV (2020/21–2024)
- Sacha Feinberg-Mngomezulu: Stormers XXIII (2021–2023)
- Marco Ferreira: Bulls XV (2025), Lions (2026)
- Schalk Ferreira: Cheetahs (2021–2024)
- Chergin Fillies: Lions (2021–2022)
- Randy Fillies: Griffons (2023)
- Likhona Finca: Lions (2026)
- Ntsika Fisanti: Sharks XV (2022), Pumas (2024–2026)
- Ethan Fisher: Sharks XV (2022), Pumas (2023)
- Nevaldo Fleurs: Sharks XV (2022–2023), Pumas (2026)
- Aston Fortuin: Sharks XV (2020/21)
- Matthew Fortuin: Sharks XV (2026)
- Reinhardt Fortuin: Cheetahs (2020/21–2024)
- Justin Forwood: Griquas (2022–2023)
- Andre Fouché: Pumas (2022–2025)
- Eddie Fouché: Pumas (2021–2022), Griquas (2023)
- Neethling Fouché: Stormers XXIII (2020/21–2024)
- Corné Fourie: Pumas (2021–2023), Cheetahs (2024)
- Deon Fourie: Stormers XXIII (2021–2025)
- Tiaan Fourie: Bulls XV (2021–2022), Sharks XV (2023–2025), Stormers XXIII (2026)
- Werner Fourie: Bulls XV (2021)
- Sam Francis: Lions (2024–2026)
- Johnathan Francke: Griquas (2020/21–2022)
- Ruswill Fredericks: Pumas (2025–2026)
- Divan Fuller: Stormers XXIII (2024–2026)

== G ==
- Thoubaan Gabriels: Cheetahs (2023)
- Stedman Gans: Bulls XV (2020/21–2025)
- Phatu Ganyane: Sharks XV (2024–2025)
- Justin Geduld: Stormers XXIII (2024–2025)
- Warrick Gelant: Stormers XXIII (2020/21–2021)
- Bentley Geldenhuys: Boland Cavaliers (2026)
- Curwin Gertse: Sharks XV (2022)
- Luan Giliomee: Sharks XV (2026)
- Keagan Glade: Sharks XV (2022)
- Andre Goedhals: Stormers XXIII (2023–2025), Pumas (2026)
- Blaine Golden: Sharks XV (2022)
- Jacques Goosen: Stormers XXIII (2022), Cheetahs (2023)
- Johan Goosen: Bulls XV (2021–2024)
- Richman Gora: Griffons (2023), Pumas (2024)
- Travis Gordon: Lions (2021–2023)
- Hannes Gous: Stormers XXIII (2022)
- Henk Gouws: Lions (2022)
- Werner Gouws: Bulls XV (2022), Griquas (2022)
- Lizo Gqoboka: Bulls XV (2020/21–2023, 2025), Stormers XXIII (2024)
- Matthew Gray: Griffons (2024)
- Christie Grobbelaar: Sharks XV (2025–2026)
- Jaco Grobbelaar: Bulls XV (2025)
- Johan Grobbelaar: Bulls XV (2020/21–2025)
- Marno Grobbelaar: Lions (2025)
- Gerbrandt Grobler: Sharks XV (2021–2024), Stormers XXIII (2026)
- Ian Groenewald: Cheetahs (2020/21)
- Wikus Groenewald: Pumas (2020/21)
- Alex Groves: Stormers XXIII (2025)
- Xolisa Guma: Cheetahs (2023)
- Mpilo Gumede: Sharks XV (2021–2023), Bulls XV (2024–2026)
- Mthokozisi Gumede: Griffons (2024), Boland Cavaliers (2025–2026)
- Njabulo Gumede: Pumas (2023), Griquas (2024)
- Arno Gustafson: Stormers XXIII (2025), Bulls XV (2026)
- Vuyo Gwiji: Lions (2026)

== H ==
- Monde Hadebe: Griquas (2020/21)
- Cameron Hanekom: Bulls XV (2022–2024)
- Boldwin Hansen: Lions (2022–2024)
- Eugene Hare: Bulls XV (2023)
- Brok Harris: Stormers XXIII (2023)
- Jack Hart: Griquas (2026)
- Munier Hartzenberg: Griquas (2022), Cheetahs (2024–2026)
- Suleiman Hartzenberg: Stormers XXIII (2023–2026)
- JD Hattingh: Lions (2026)
- Nick Hatton: Sharks XV (2022–2025)
- Michal Haznar: Stormers XXIII (2020/21), Griquas (2021)
- Ameer Hendricks: Boland Cavaliers (2025)
- Cornal Hendricks: Bulls XV (2020/21–2024)
- Liam Hendricks: Pumas (2020/21)
- Jaden Hendrikse: Sharks XV (2020/21–2025)
- Jordan Hendrikse: Lions (2021–2022), Sharks XV (2024)
- Wiehahn Herbst: Lions (2020/21), Sharks XV (2021–2023)
- Dian Heunis: Sharks XV (2025–2026)
- Batho Hlekani: Sharks XV (2024–2025)
- Jon Hobson: Bulls XV (2026)
- Duren Hoffman: Griffons (2023)
- Chris Hollis: Griquas (2021–2022), Griffons (2024)
- Ethan Hooker: Sharks XV (2024)
- Chris Horak: Sharks XV (2024–2026)
- Francke Horn: Lions (2020/21–2024)
- Layton Horn: Lions (2024–2026)
- Louwan Horn: Stormers XXIII (2023)
- Quan Horn: Lions (2022–2025)
- Cameron Hufke: Griquas (2024–2026)
- Jason Hugo: Lions (2026)
- Reniel Hugo: Cheetahs (2020/21), Sharks XV (2021–2024)
- Dewald Human: Griffons (2024)
- Robert Hunt: Bulls XV (2022–2023), Cheetahs (2024)

== I ==
- Henry Immelman: Bulls XV (2024–2025), Cheetahs (2026)
- Alfondso Isaacs: Bulls XV (2025), Pumas (2026)
- Vaughen Isaacs: Lions (2022–2023)
- Ruwellyn Isbell: Pumas (2020/21)
- Travis Ismaiel: Bulls XV (2020/21)

== J ==
- Gerado Jaars: Sharks XV (2022)
- Hanro Jacobs: Sharks XV (2020/21–2024)
- PJ Jacobs: Pumas (2023)
- Stravino Jacobs: Bulls XV (2020/21–2025)
- Xolani Jacobs: Griffons (2023–2024)
- Malcolm Jaer: Cheetahs (2020/21–2022), Griquas (2023)
- Ethan James: Stormers XXIII (2022)
- Etienne Janeke: Pumas (2021–2026)
- Lindsey Jansen: Bulls XV (2026)
- Marco Jansen van Vuren: Bulls XV (2020/21–2023), Cheetahs (2024–2026)
- Pieter Jansen van Vuren: Pumas (2020/21–2021), Lions (2023), Cheetahs (2024–2025)
- Marko Janse van Rensburg: Pumas (2020/21), Cheetahs (2023–2026)
- Nico Janse van Rensburg: Bulls XV (2026)
- Rohan Janse van Rensburg: Sharks XV (2023)
- Elton Jantjies: Lions (2020/21)
- Herschel Jantjies: Stormers XXIII (2020/21)
- Cohen Jasper: Cheetahs (2021–2026)
- John-Roy Jenkinson: Griquas (2020/21)
- Onke Jiba: Sharks XV (2022)
- Sebastiaan Jobb: Bulls XV (2021)
- Keagan Johannes: Bulls XV (2020/21–2026)
- Josh Jonas: Sharks XV (2023)
- Rynhardt Jonker: Griquas (2022), Lions (2023–2026)
- Cheswill Jooste: Bulls XV (2025)
- Dan Jooste: Sharks XV (2020/21–2024)
- Adrian Joubert: Bulls XV (2023)
- Morné Joubert: Pumas (2020/21)
- Jurenzo Julius: Sharks XV (2024)
- Jaywinn Juries: Griffons (2023)

== K ==
- Labib Kannemayer: Stormers XXIII (2023–2024)
- Daniel Kasende: Griquas (2020/21–2021), Cheetahs (2022–2024)
- Oli Kebble: Stormers XXIII (2026)
- Dawid Kellerman: Bulls XV (2020/21)
- Gert Kemp: Stormers XXIII (2026)
- Exauce Kevani: Lions (2026)
- Eduan Keyter: Griquas (2020/21–2021), Sharks XV (2022–2024), Lions (2025)
- Imad Khan: Stormers XXIII (2023–2024)
- Athenkosi Khethani: Sharks XV (2023), Griquas (2024–2025)
- Mhleli Khuzwayo: Stormers XXIII (2024–2026)
- Cohen Kiewit: Bulls XV (2025)
- Kayden Kiewit: Lions (2022–2023)
- Shane Kirkwood: Pumas (2021–2024)
- Jannes Kirsten: Bulls XV (2024)
- Patrick Kitete: Stormers XXIII (2023)
- Steven Kitshoff: Stormers XXIII (2020/21–2024)
- Berton Klaasen: Griquas (2020/21)
- Harlon Klaasen: Griquas (2020/21)
- Francois Kleinhans: Pumas (2020/21–2023)
- Japie Kleinhans: Pumas (2020/21–2022)
- Francois Klopper: Bulls XV (2021–2025)
- Franco Knoetze: Bulls XV (2023)
- Gideon Koegelenberg: Sharks XV (2025)
- Dian Koen: Cheetahs (2023)
- Liam Koen: Bulls XV (2025), Griquas (2026)
- Orateng Koikanyang: Griffons (2024)
- Werner Kok: Sharks XV (2020/21–2023)
- Siya Kolisi: Stormers XXIII (2020/21)
- Lloyd Koster: Sharks XV (2022), Stormers XXIII (2023)
- Murray Koster: Sharks XV (2021–2024)
- Andrew Kota: Pumas (2023, 2025), Griffons (2024)
- JJ Kotze: Stormers XXIII (2021–2025)
- SJ Kotze: Lions (2024–2025)
- Ruan Kramer: Pumas (2020/21–2022)
- Dan Kriel: Lions (2020/21–2021)
- David Kriel: Bulls XV (2020/21–2025)
- Jaco Kriel: Lions (2020/21)
- Richard Kriel: Bulls XV (2021–2022), Lions (2025)
- Stephan Krugel: Pumas (2026)
- Danie Kruger: Stormers XXIII (2026)
- Jared Kruger: Griffons (2024)
- Rewan Kruger: Cheetahs (2022–2026)
- Tertius Kruger: Griquas (2023–2025)
- Rambo Kubheka: Sharks XV (2025–2026)
- Andrew Kuhn: Griquas (2021)
- Michael Kumbirai: Sharks XV (2020/21)
- Hakeem Kunene: Sharks XV (2024–2025), Bulls XV (2026)

== L ==
- Gerrie Labuschagné: Pumas (2021)
- Jaco Labuschagne: Bulls XV (2021–2022), Pumas (2023)
- Jeandre Labuschagne: Sharks XV (2021–2024)
- Erhard Lambrecht: Stormers XXIII (2025)
- Erik Lambrecht: Boland Cavaliers (2025)
- Darrien Landsberg: Pumas (2020/21–2022), Lions (2023–2025)
- Tiaan Lange: Bulls XV (2023–2024), Griquas (2025–2026)
- Corné Lavagna: Bulls XV (2024), Griquas (2025–2026)
- Katlego Letebele: Bulls XV (2024–2025)
- Jeandré Leonard: Griquas (2021), Pumas (2023–2025), Boland Cavaliers (2026)
- Joel Leotlela: Stormers XXIII (2024–2026)
- AJ le Roux: Pumas (2020/21)
- Bryan le Roux: Stormers XXIII (2024), Bulls XV (2025), Pumas (2026)
- Coetzee le Roux: Sharks XV (2024–2025)
- Neil le Roux: Bulls XV (2026)
- Jurick Lewis: Boland Cavaliers (2026)
- Tristan Leyds: Stormers XXIII (2020/21–2025)
- Manie Libbok: Sharks XV (2020/21–2021), Stormers XXIII (2024)
- Albert Liebenberg: Griquas (2023–2026)
- Cameron Lindsay: Griquas (2020/21–2022)
- Hilton Lobberts: Stormers XXIII (2022)
- Gianni Lombard: Lions (2023–2025)
- Sebastian Lombard: Bulls XV (2022–2023), Lions (2025)
- Juan Loots: Sharks XV (2026)
- Wayrin Losper: Cheetahs (2023), Boland Cavaliers (2025)
- Andell Loubser: Cheetahs (2023)
- Boeta Loubser: Cheetahs (2023)
- George Lourens: Cheetahs (2022–2024)
- Elrigh Louw: Bulls XV (2020/21–2023)
- Johan Louw: Griquas (2025)
- Marius Louw: Sharks XV (2020/21–2022), Lions (2023–2024)
- Wilco Louw: Bulls XV (2024)
- Eduan Lubbe: Bulls XV (2021)
- Herman Lubbe: Stormers XXIII (2025–2026)
- Reinhardt Ludwig: Bulls XV (2021–2023)
- Anele Lungisa: Pumas (2022–2024)
- HJ Luus: Griquas (2020/21–2021)
- Leon Lyons: Stormers XXIII (2020/21–2023), Griquas (2024–2026)

== M ==
- KB Maake: Bulls XV (2026)
- Dylan Maart: Griquas (2024–2026)
- Daniel Maartens: Pumas (2020/21–2022), Cheetahs (2023–2026)
- Sivu Mabece: Lions (2024)
- Khwezi Mafu: Pumas (2021–2022), Boland Cavaliers (2025–2026)
- Tapiwa Mafura: Pumas (2020/21–2022), Cheetahs (2023), Lions (2024–2025)
- Thabang Mahlasi: Cheetahs (2025)
- Kefentse Mahlo: Bulls XV (2021)
- Connor Mahoney: Griquas (2024–2026)
- Mzamo Majola: Sharks XV (2020/21–2021)
- Sako Makata: Griquas (2023–2024, 2026), Stormers XXIII (2025)
- Ntokozo Makhaza: Cheetahs (2025)
- Dominic Malgas: Stormers XXIII (2026)
- Frans Malherbe: Stormers XXIII (2020/21)
- Sintu Manjezi: Bulls XV (2020/21–2026)
- André Manuel: Stormers XXIII (2022)
- Tharquinn Manuel: Bulls XV (2022)
- Matome Manyama: Cheetahs (2026)
- Makazole Mapimpi: Sharks XV (2024)
- Lionel Mapoe: Bulls XV (2021–2024)
- Phumzile Maqondwana: Pumas (2020/21–2022), Bulls XV (2023), Griquas (2025–2026)
- De Wet Marais: Stormers XXIII (2021–2025), Pumas (2026)
- Franco Marais: Lions (2024–2025)
- Jacques Marais: Sharks XV (2022–2026)
- Niel Marais: Pumas (2021)
- Theo Maree: Griquas (2020/21)
- Armand Maritz: Stormers XXIII (2023)
- Dewald Maritz: Pumas (2020/21–2025), Boland Cavaliers (2026)
- Damian Markus: Stormers XXIII (2023–2025), Griquas (2026)
- JC Mars: Stormers XXIII (2024–2026)
- Thurlow Marsh: Boland Cavaliers (2025–2026)
- Devon Martinus: Sharks XV (2023)
- Drico Marx: Sharks XV (2025)
- Marvelous Mashimbyi: Pumas (2024–2026)
- Godlen Masimla: Stormers XXIII (2020/21–2023), Pumas (2024), Boland Cavaliers (2025–2026)
- Chris Massyn: Cheetahs (2020/21)
- Len Massyn: Lions (2020/21)
- Siya Masuku: Cheetahs (2021–2023), Sharks XV (2024–2026)
- Simphiwe Matanzima: Bulls XV (2021–2025)
- Vernon Matongo: Stormers XXIII (2024–2025)
- Jurie Matthee: Stormers XXIII (2023–2025)
- Duncan Matthews: Lions (2021)
- Lyle Matthews: Sharks XV (2026)
- Granwill Matthys: Griffons (2023)
- Tinotenda Mavesere: Sharks XV (2023–2026)
- Thato Mavundla: Griffons (2023–2024)
- Rabz Maxwane: Lions (2021–2026)
- Lee-Marvin Mazibuko: Stormers XXIII (2020/21–2023), Sharks XV (2025–2026)
- Masikane Mazwi: Sharks XV (2023)
- Fez Mbatha: Sharks XV (2020/21–2025)
- Lungi Mbiko: Griffons (2024), Griquas (2026)
- Bongi Mbonambi: Stormers XXIII (2020/21)
- Sphephelo Mbonambi: Sharks XV (2025)
- Nathan McBeth: Lions (2021)
- Khutha Mchunu: Cheetahs (2020/21), Sharks XV (2021–2023), Bulls XV (2024)
- Ntuthuko Mchunu: Sharks XV (2021–2024)
- Jordan McLoughlin: Pumas (2026)
- Mawande Mdanda: Sharks XV (2024–2025), Bulls XV (2026)
- David Meihuizen: Stormers XXIII (2020/21–2022)
- Gilermo Mentoe: Lions (2026)
- Viaan Mentoor: Bulls XV (2026)
- John-Hubert Meyer: Sharks XV (2020/21)
- Tian Meyer: Cheetahs (2020/21–2021), Sharks XV (2024)
- Ali Mgijima: Pumas (2020/21–2023), Cheetahs (2024–2025)
- Munashe Mhere: Pumas (2024)
- Dylan Miller: Stormers XXIII (2026)
- Simon Miller: Stormers XXIII (2021–2022), Cheetahs (2026)
- Bronson Mills: Lions (2023–2025)
- Xavier Mitchell: Boland Cavaliers (2025–2026)
- Zee Mkhabela: Sharks XV (2022–2023)
- Luyanda Mkhize: Sharks XV (2023)
- Mambo Mkhize: Stormers XXIII (2022)
- Wandile Mlaba: Stormers XXIII (2026)
- Esethu Mnebelele: Bulls XV (2025–2026)
- Howard Mnisi: Cheetahs (2020/21–2021)
- Salmaan Moerat: Stormers XXIII (2020/21)
- Neo Mohapi: Griffons (2023)
- Oupa Mohojé: Cheetahs (2020/21–2024)
- Kabelo Mokoena: Bulls XV (2020/21–2023), Pumas (2024)
- James Mollentze: Lions (2022)
- Johan Momsen: Griquas (2020/21–2021), Sharks XV (2026)
- Khwezi Mona: Sharks XV (2021–2024)
- Canan Moodie: Bulls XV (2022–2024)
- Josh Moon: Sharks XV (2022)
- Asad Moos: Stormers XXIII (2025), Lions (2026)
- Keke Morabe: Stormers XXIII (2022–2026)
- Matt More: Pumas (2021), Lions (2022–2023)
- Sergio Moreira: Cheetahs (2022)
- Mihlali Mosi: Cheetahs (2021–2022, 2025), Bulls XV (2023–2024)
- Juan Mostert: Bulls XV (2022–2023), Boland Cavaliers (2025)
- JJ Motlhodi: Bulls XV (2026)
- Vusi Moyo: Sharks XV (2025)
- Kelly Mpeku: Lions (2023–2025)
- Malembe Mpofu: Pumas (2022–2024), Griquas (2025–2026)
- Sandisiwe Msengana: Bulls XV (2026)
- Lundi Msenge: Pumas (2022–2026)
- Banele Mthenjane: Lions (2021–2022)
- Kuhle Mthimkhulu: Sharks XV (2025)
- Oupa Mthiyane: Lions (2021)
- Ilunga Mukendi: Lions (2022–2023)
- Johan Mulder: Bulls XV (2021), Griquas (2022–2023)
- Marcell Muller: Cheetahs (2023)
- Markus Muller: Stormers XXIII (2026)
- Hillary Mwanjilwa: Griffons (2023)
- Nqoba Mxoli: Griquas (2020/21–2021), Cheetahs (2023)

== N ==
- Morgan Naudé: Pumas (2020/21–2021), Lions (2023–2026)
- Ox Nché: Sharks XV (2020/21)
- Lunga Ncube: Lions (2021–2022)
- Lindo Ncusane: Lions (2022)
- Abulele Ndabambi: Bulls XV (2024)
- Mfundo Ndhlovu: Stormers XXIII (2026)
- Enos Ndiao: Stormers XXIII (2024–2026)
- Thabo Ndimande: Griquas (2023–2024), Pumas (2026)
- Bandisa Ndlovu: Griquas (2020/21)
- Sasko Ndlovu: Lions (2022), Cheetahs (2025)
- Christiaan Nel: Griffons (2024)
- Jandré Nel: Cheetahs (2024–2026)
- Jay-Cee Nel: Bulls XV (2020/21), Griquas (2021–2024), Pumas (2026)
- Jooste Nel: Cheetahs (2026)
- Louw Nel: Stormers XXIII (2023–2026)
- Ruhan Nel: Stormers XXIII (2020/21–2025)
- Scott Nel: Sharks XV (2024)
- Steven Nel: Bulls XV (2025)
- Tom Nel: Stormers XXIII (2023), Griquas (2025)
- Latica Nela: Lions (2026)
- Brooklyn Newman: Bulls XV (2025–2026)
- Ezekiel Ngobeni: Stormers XXIII (2024–2026)
- Simphiwe Ngobese: Sharks XV (2025–2026)
- Ebune Ngundue (Note: Known and listed as Mango Ngundue in some squad lists.): Griffons (2024)
- Wikus Nieuwenhuis: Griffons (2023–2024)
- Tielman Nieuwoudt: Bulls XV (2022–2024), Cheetahs (2025–2026)
- Siya Ningiza: Sharks XV (2023–2024)
- Sihle Njezula: Stormers XXIII (2021)
- Prince Nkabinde: Griquas (2022), Lions (2023), Cheetahs (2025–2026)
- Sbu Nkosi: Sharks XV (2020/21), Bulls XV (2023), Cheetahs (2024)
- Tebogo Nkosi: Cheetahs (2026)
- Litha Nkula: Cheetahs (2024)
- Olajuwon Noa: Sharks XV (2022)
- Sanele Nohamba: Sharks XV (2020/21–2022), Lions (2022–2024)
- Buhle Nojekwa: Griffons (2023–2024), Pumas (2024)
- Abongile Nonkontwana: Bulls XV (2026)
- Sipho Nonyalela: Sharks XV (2026)
- Quewin Nortje: Bulls XV (2022–2023), Stormers XXIII (2025)
- Ruan Nortjé: Bulls XV (2020/21–2023)
- Riley Norton: Stormers XXIII (2025)
- Reinhard Nothnagel: Lions (2020/21–2024)
- Sikhumbuzo Notshe: Sharks XV (2020/21–2023)
- Sibongile Novuka: Bulls XV (2021–2024)
- Asenathi Ntlabakanye: Lions (2021–2025)
- Liyema Ntshanga: Lions (2026)
- Andisa Ntsila: Cheetahs (2020/21–2023)
- Scarra Ntubeni: Stormers XXIII (2020/21–2026)
- Lamla Nunu: Stormers XXIII (2023), Boland Cavaliers (2025)
- Lunathi Nxele: Boland Cavaliers (2025–2026)
- Edwin Nxumalo: Griffons (2024)
- Trevor Nyakane: Bulls XV (2020/21), Sharks XV (2024)
- Xola Nyali: Stormers XXIII (2026)

== O ==
- Luther Obi: Pumas (2020/21), Griquas (2022–2023)
- Daimon O'Connell: Bulls XV (2025)
- Burger Odendaal: Lions (2020/21–2022)
- John Kelly Okonkwo: Cheetahs (2025–2026)
- Chijindu Okonta: Sharks XV (2025–2026)
- Friedle Olivier: Cheetahs (2023–2024)
- Luann Olivier: Sharks XV (2026)
- Merwe Olivier: Bulls XV (2023–2024)
- Rian Olivier: Griffons (2023–2024)
- Thomas Ongera: Griffons (2023–2024)
- Etienne Oosthuizen: Lions (2024)
- Lourens Oosthuizen: Griquas (2025–2026)
- Raegan Oranje: Griquas (2021–2023), Cheetahs (2025)
- Shaine Orderson: Stormers XXIII (2022)
- Marvin Orie: Lions (2020/21), Bulls XV (2025)
- Darnell Osuagwu: Lions (2022), Pumas (2023–2025), Boland Cavaliers (2026)
- Niel Otto: Stormers XXIII (2021), Pumas (2021), Griquas (2022–2023)

== P ==
- Marco Palvie: Sharks XV (2023)
- Embrose Papier: Bulls XV (2020/21–2025)
- Joshua Paris: Griffons (2024)
- Cecil Parsons: Lions (2026)
- Vernon Paulo: Cheetahs (2024–2025), Stormers XXIII (2026)
- Haashim Pead: Lions (2025–2026)
- FP Pelser: Lions (2021)
- MJ Pelser: Lions (2021–2022)
- Yaw Penxe: Sharks XV (2020/21–2025)
- Sergeal Petersen: Stormers XXIII (2020/21–2022), Bulls XV (2024)
- Robbie Petzer: Pumas (2022), Griffons (2023–2024)
- Gilroy Philander: Griffons (2024)
- Carl-Evert Pienaar: Griffons (2024)
- Ruan Pienaar: Cheetahs (2021–2023)
- Stean Pienaar: Lions (2020/21–2023)
- Hanu Pieterse: Sharks XV (2026)
- Mango Piti: Griffons (2024)
- Ben Pitout: Cheetahs (2025–2026)
- Heiko Pohlmann: Lions (2022–2025), Boland Cavaliers (2026)
- Junior Pokomela: Cheetahs (2021), Stormers XXIII (2022–2023), Bulls XV (2025)
- Lavela Pongolo: Bulls XV (2026)
- Gary Porter: Stormers XXIII (2023–2026)
- Zachary Porthen: Stormers XXIII (2024–2025)
- Duwan Potgieter: Bulls XV (2026)
- Ewart Potgieter: Pumas (2020/21)
- Jacques Potgieter: Cheetahs (2021)
- Jannes Potgieter: Sharks XV (2024–2026)
- Lohan Potgieter: Cheetahs (2021)
- Marnus Potgieter: Bulls XV (2020/21), Sharks XV (2021–2026)
- Willie Potgieter: Bulls XV (2022)
- Derik Pretorius: Griquas (2022–2026)
- Duan Pretorius: Griffons (2023–2024)
- JC Pretorius: Lions (2023–2024)
- Jean-Jacques Pretorius: Griffons (2023)
- Rikus Pretorius: Stormers XXIII (2020/21–2022)
- Tiaan Pretorius: Pumas (2025)
- Ig Prinsloo: Pumas (2020/21–2023), Sharks XV (2024), Griquas (2025–2026)
- Janco Purchase: Sharks XV (2025–2026)

== Q ==
- Sibabalo Qoma: Griquas (2020/21–2022), Cheetahs (2023), Lions (2024–2026)

== R ==
- Altus Rabe: Stormers XXIII (2026)
- Inny Radebe: Sharks XV (2022)
- Marnus Rademeyer: Bulls XV (2026)
- Corne Rahl: Sharks XV (2022–2025)
- Khuthi Rasivhaga: Sharks XV (2025–2026)
- Mannie Rass: Lions (2020/21–2025)
- Simon Raw: Pumas (2022–2023)
- Olly Reid: Stormers XXIII (2025)
- Johan Retief: Griquas (2022–2023)
- Braam Reyneke: Sharks XV (2022–2024)
- Luca Ribbens: Lions (2024–2025)
- Dylan Richardson: Sharks XV (2020/21–2024)
- Rhynardt Rijnsburger: Lions (2023)
- Fazeel Robertson: Stormers XXIII (2023)
- Zinedine Robinson: Griquas (2024)
- Jonathan Roche: Stormers XXIII (2022–2025)
- Nick Roebeck: Stormers XXIII (2024)
- Le Roux Roets: Pumas (2020/21), Sharks XV (2021–2022)
- Raynard Roets: Bulls XV (2022), Lions (2023–2025)
- Matt Romao: Sharks XV (2024–2025)
- Evan Roos: Stormers XXIII (2021–2025)
- Kowie Roos: Bulls XV (2022)
- Divan Rossouw: Lions (2022)
- Luke Rossouw: Lions (2022)
- Jacques Rousseau: Stormers XXIII (2023)
- Damon Royle: Sharks XV (2023)
- Jeandré Rudolph: Cheetahs (2020/21–2024), Bulls XV (2025)

== S ==
- Duncan Saal: Cheetahs (2020/21–2022), Stormers XXIII (2023)
- Carlü Sadie: Lions (2020/21–2022), Sharks XV (2023)
- Zukisa Sali: Pumas (2025–2026)
- Sazi Sandi: Stormers XXIII (2020/21–2024)
- Sibusiso Sangweni: Lions (2021–2023), Stormers XXIII (2024), Boland Cavaliers (2025–2026)
- Keegan Schaefer: Griffons (2024)
- JJ Scheepers: Bulls XV (2021), Pumas (2025–2026)
- JD Schickerling: Stormers XXIII (2020/21–2025)
- Hendré Schoeman: Bulls XV (2026)
- Juan Schoeman: Lions (2024–2026)
- Juandre Schoeman: Bulls XV (2026)
- Marnus Schoeman: Lions (2020/21)
- Paul Schoeman: Cheetahs (2023)
- RF Schoeman: Lions (2024–2025)
- Ruben Schoeman: Lions (2021–2025)
- Tian Schoeman: Cheetahs (2020/21)
- Chris Schreuder: Stormers XXIII (2021–2022)
- Louis Schreuder: Boland Cavaliers (2025–2026)
- Dieter Schubert: Bulls XV (2026)
- Shaun Schurmann: Bulls XV (2025–2026)
- Andries Schutte: Griquas (2021–2022)
- Tyler Sefoor: Griquas (2024)
- Victor Sekekete: Cheetahs (2020/21–2026)
- Ngia Selengbe: Lions (2022)
- Seabelo Senatla: Stormers XXIII (2020/21–2025)
- Chriswill September: Pumas (2020/21–2023), Boland Cavaliers (2025–2026)
- Marquit September: Griffons (2023)
- Jan Serfontein: Bulls XV (2025)
- Bruce Sherwood: Stormers XXIII (2023)
- Ntobeko Shezi: Griquas (2025–2026)
- Sibusiso Shongwe: Lions (2022)
- Hennie Sieberhagen: Sharks XV (2024)
- Zweli Silaule: Pumas (2022)
- Wandisile Simelane: Lions (2020/21–2022), Bulls XV (2023), Stormers XXIII (2024–2025)
- Hanru Sirgel: Griquas (2021–2024)
- Mahle Sithole: Lions (2026)
- Sti Sithole: Lions (2020/21–2023), Stormers XXIII (2024–2025)
- Okuhle Siyeni: Lions (2022)
- Dylan Sjoblom: Griquas (2023–2024), Lions (2025–2026)
- Courtnall Skosan: Lions (2020/21–2021), Stormers XXIII (2024–2025)
- Deon Slabbert: Pumas (2022–2024), Sharks XV (2025–2026)
- Juan Smal: Cheetahs (2026)
- William Small-Smith: Cheetahs (2020/21)
- Cal Smid: Lions (2022–2023)
- Chris Smit: Cheetahs (2020/21–2022), Bulls XV (2023–2025), Boland Cavaliers (2026)
- Cornel Smit: Stormers XXIII (2021–2023, 2026), Bulls XV (2024–2025)
- Dillon Smit: Lions (2021)
- Domenic Smit: Griffons (2023), Boland Cavaliers (2025–2026)
- Jean-Henri Smit: Sharks XV (2026)
- Roelof Smit: Lions (2020/21–2021), Stormers XXIII (2022), Cheetahs (2023)
- Stephan Smit: Bulls XV (2022), Griquas (2023–2024)
- Adré Smith: Griquas (2020/21–2021), Stormers XXIII (2022–2025)
- Chris Smith: Bulls XV (2020/21–2024), Lions (2025)
- Dillon Smith: Griquas (2026)
- Dylan Smith: Lions (2020/21), Bulls XV (2022–2026)
- Franco Smith: Cheetahs (2025)
- Jean Smith: Sharks XV (2022–2025)
- JP Smith: Lions (2022)
- Keagan Smith: Lions (2026)
- Kyle Smith: Stormers XXIII (2024–2026)
- Mornay Smith: Bulls XV (2020/21–2025)
- Rhyno Smith: Cheetahs (2020/21)
- Ruan Smith: Lions (2023)
- Ginter Smuts: Pumas (2020/21–2021), Lions (2022)
- Brendon Snyman: Pumas (2020/21)
- Giovan Snyman: Pumas (2020/21–2023)
- Mark Snyman: Lions (2021–2022)
- PK Sobahle: Sharks XV (2023, 2025), Pumas (2024)
- Chad Solomon: Stormers XXIII (2020/21–2023)
- Rosko Specman: Cheetahs (2020/21–2022), Griquas (2023)
- Ulrich Stander: Cheetahs (2024)
- Hendré Stassen: Stormers XXIII (2024)
- Gerhard Steenekamp: Bulls XV (2020/21–2023)
- PJ Steenkamp: Lions (2021–2023)
- Ruan Steenkamp: Griquas (2021–2022)
- Walt Steenkamp: Bulls XV (2020/21–2022)
- WJ Steenkamp: Bulls XV (2020/21–2023), Lions (2025)
- Kevin Stevens: Cheetahs (2023)
- François Steyn: Cheetahs (2020/21–2023)
- Morné Steyn: Bulls XV (2020/21–2023)
- Nico Steyn: Lions (2022–2025)
- Jade Stighling: Bulls XV (2020/21), Pumas (2021–2023)
- Johnré Stopforth: Cheetahs (2023), Lions (2025), Boland Cavaliers (2026)
- Ruhan Straeuli: Lions (2021–2024)
- Josh Strauss: Bulls XV (2025)
- Zeilinga Strydom: Lions (2022–2023)
- Dries Swanepoel: Cheetahs (2020/21)
- Janko Swanepoel: Bulls XV (2020/21–2023)
- Tiaan Swanepoel: Lions (2020/21–2023), Sharks XV (2024), Cheetahs (2025–2026)
- Tino Swanepoel: Pumas (2024–2026)
- Clinton Swart: Bulls XV (2020/21), Pumas (2024–2026)
- Eduan Swart: Pumas (2020/21–2025)
- Ruan Swart: Bulls XV (2025), Lions (2026)
- Sean Swart: Griquas (2023)
- Xavier Swartbooi: Griquas (2024)
- André Swarts: Griquas (2020/21–2022)
- Jacques Swarts: Bulls XV (2026)
- Sampie Swiegers: Pumas (2024–2026)
- Tim Swiel: Stormers XXIII (2020/21–2022), Sharks XV (2026)

== T ==
- Etienne Taljaard: Pumas (2020/21–2023)
- Madosh Tambwe: Sharks XV (2020/21), Bulls XV (2021–2022)
- Ben Tapuai: Sharks XV (2022)
- Jarrod Taylor: Stormers XXIII (2022–2023)
- James Tedder: Lions (2022), Boland Cavaliers (2025–2026)
- Heinrich Theron: Bulls XV (2026)
- JJ Theron: Bulls XV (2025–2026)
- Hanno Theunissen: Pumas (2025)
- Marcel Theunissen: Stormers XXIII (2020/21–2025)
- Curtly Thomas: Griffons (2023–2024), Cheetahs (2026)
- Brandon Thomson: Cheetahs (2021–2022), Pumas (2023)
- Marcqiewn Titus: Griquas (2024), Boland Cavaliers (2025)
- Sidney Tobias: Bulls XV (2021–2022), Boland Cavaliers (2025–2026)
- Alulutho Tshakweni: Cheetahs (2021–2023), Bulls XV (2024–2025)
- Ebenezer Tshimanga: Stormers XXIII (2022)
- Manu Tshituka: Lions (2021–2023), Sharks XV (2024–2025)
- Vincent Tshituka: Lions (2020/21–2022), Sharks XV (2023–2025)

== U ==
- Jamba Ulengo: Lions (2020/21–2021), Griffons (2023)
- Thomas Ulengo: Griffons (2023)
- Stefan Ungerer: Griquas (2021–2022), Stormers XXIII (2024–2026)
- Jan Uys: Bulls XV (2020/21)
- Janco Uys: Griquas (2021–2026)
- Muller Uys: Bulls XV (2021–2023)
- Pierre-Raymond Uys: Cheetahs (2024–2026)
- Ramon Uys: Cheetahs (2026)

== V ==
- Brandon Valentyn: Pumas (2020/21–2022)
- Cephas van Biljon: Bulls XV (2026)
- Connor van Buuren: Lions (2022–2023)
- Morné van den Berg: Lions (2020/21–2024)
- Willem van den Hever: Griffons (2024), Sharks XV (2025–2026)
- Wayne van der Bank: Pumas (2020/21–2021)
- Bernard van der Linde: Bulls XV (2022–2024)
- Akker van der Merwe: Bulls XV (2024)
- Arno van der Merwe: Cheetahs (2026)
- Carel van der Merwe: Griquas (2025–2026)
- Edwill van der Merwe: Stormers XXIII (2021), Lions (2022–2024)
- Gideon van der Merwe: Griquas (2020/21–2021), Cheetahs (2022–2025)
- Ian van der Merwe: Bulls XV (2026)
- Marcel van der Merwe: Bulls XV (2020/21)
- Marnus van der Merwe: Cheetahs (2020/21–2023)
- Pieter van der Merwe: Bulls XV (2026)
- Ruwald van der Merwe: Pumas (2023–2026)
- Tiaan van der Merwe: Griquas (2021)
- JJ van der Mescht: Sharks XV (2020/21–2021)
- Louritz van der Schyff: Bulls XV (2021)
- Wilhelm van der Sluys: Lions (2020/21)
- Jac van der Walt: Griquas (2024–2025)
- Jaco van der Walt: Bulls XV (2024–2025), Cheetahs (2026)
- Abri van der Westhuizen: Bulls XV (2025)
- Dayan van der Westhuizen: Boland Cavaliers (2025–2026)
- Ewald van der Westhuizen: Griquas (2020/21–2021)
- George van der Westhuizen: Stormers XXIII (2023)
- Juan van der Westhuizen: Bulls XV (2023)
- Louis van der Westhuizen: Cheetahs (2020/21–2025)
- Conor van Eden: Pumas (2026)
- Carlo van Greunen: Stormers XXIII (2025)
- Emile van Heerden: Sharks XV (2021–2025)
- JF van Heerden: Bulls XV (2024–2025)
- Ruben van Heerden: Sharks XV (2020/21–2022), Stormers XXIII (2023–2025)
- PA van Niekerk: Bulls XV (2025–2026)
- Wian van Niekerk: Pumas (2023–2026)
- Abner van Reenen: Stormers XXIII (2021), Cheetahs (2024)
- Ghudian van Reenen: Bulls XV (2024)
- Ruan van Rensburg: Cheetahs (2023)
- Ernst van Rhyn: Stormers XXIII (2020/21–2023)
- Alandré van Rooyen: Griquas (2020/21–2022)
- Jacques van Rooyen: Bulls XV (2020/21–2024)
- HP van Schoor: Pumas (2021), Stormers XXIII (2022), Griffons (2023), Boland Cavaliers (2025)
- Marco van Staden: Bulls XV (2020/21–2023)
- Conraad van Vuuren: Cheetahs (2020/21–2023), Lions (2024–2026)
- Jurie van Vuuren: Boland Cavaliers (2025)
- Kerron van Vuuren: Sharks XV (2020/21–2024, 2026)
- Michael van Vuuren: Lions (2023)
- Gideon van Wyk: Cheetahs (2021), Stormers XXIII (2025)
- Henco van Wyk: Lions (2021–2025)
- Hencus van Wyk: Cheetahs (2021–2025), Stormers XXIII (2026)
- Liam van Wyk: Sharks XV (2025–2026)
- Shilton van Wyk: Stormers XXIII (2025)
- Chris van Zyl: Stormers XXIII (2020/21)
- Chyle van Zyl: Pumas (2026)
- Ivan van Zyl: Bulls XV (2020/21–2021)
- Jacques van Zyl: Stormers XXIII (2022)
- Joe van Zyl: Bulls XV (2020/21–2025)
- CJ Velleman: Griquas (2020/21), Stormers XXIII (2024)
- Andre-Hugo Venter: Stormers XXIII (2021–2024)
- Boan Venter: Cheetahs (2020/21)
- Brendan Venter: Stormers XXIII (2025)
- Dameon Venter: Lions (2022), Sharks XV (2023)
- Divan Venter: Bulls XV (2020/21)
- Francois Venter: Sharks XV (2023–2025)
- Henco Venter: Sharks XV (2020/21–2023)
- James Venter: Sharks XV (2020/21–2024)
- Janco Venter: Griquas (2023)
- Janus Venter: Cheetahs (2021–2023), Griquas (2026)
- Juan Venter: Cheetahs (2025–2026)
- Morne Venter: Lions (2026)
- Reinach Venter: Cheetahs (2020/21), Stormers XXIII (2021)
- Ruan Venter: Lions (2022–2025)
- Stefan Venter: Cheetahs (2026)
- James Verity-Amm: Griquas (2020/21–2021), Bulls XV (2022), Cheetahs (2025)
- Ali Vermaak: Stormers XXIII (2020/21–2024), Boland Cavaliers (2026)
- Ruan Vermaak: Bulls XV (2022–2023)
- Duane Vermeulen: Bulls XV (2020/21)
- Keanu Vers: Griffons (2023–2024)
- Laurence Victor: Cheetahs (2023–2024), Boland Cavaliers (2025–2026)
- Andries Viljoen: Pumas (2022)
- EW Viljoen: Lions (2020/21–2022)
- Reinier Viljoen: Cheetahs (2021), Sharks XV (2024)
- Alwayno Visagie: Pumas (2020/21–2022), Sharks XV (2023–2024)
- Danrich Visagie: Pumas (2024–2026)
- Jaco Visagie: Lions (2020/21–2025)
- Adolph Visser: Bulls XV (2021)
- Tijde Visser: Griquas (2020/21–2021)
- Christiaan Vlok: Bulls XV (2026)
- Lukhanyo Vokozela: Stormers XXIII (2022–2025)
- Anthony Volmink: Sharks XV (2020/21–2024)
- Neels Volschenk: Cheetahs (2024–2026)
- Harold Vorster: Bulls XV (2021–2025)
- Sisonke Vumazonke: Cheetahs (2024–2026)
- Wasi Vyambwera: Sharks XV (2026)

== W ==
- Ulrich Wahl: Stormers XXIII (2024)
- Jeremy Ward: Sharks XV (2020/21–2022)
- André Warner: Lions (2020/21–2023)
- Carl Wegner: Cheetahs (2020/21–2026)
- Gurshwin Wehr: Griffons (2024), Griquas (2025–2026)
- Corné Weilbach: Stormers XXIII (2022–2024)
- Valentino Wellman: Pumas (2026)
- Ruan Welman: Lions (2026)
- Chadley Wenn: Griffons (2023–2024)
- Ethan Wentzel: Cheetahs (2024–2026)
- Jan-Hendrik Wessels: Bulls XV (2020/21–2024)
- Tiaan Wessels: Lions (2024–2026)
- Simon Westraadt: Pumas (2020/21–2021), Griquas (2022), Griffons (2024)
- Junior White: Lions (2022)
- George Whitehead: Griquas (2020/21–2026)
- Cameron Whitson: Stormers XXIII (2024)
- Cobus Wiese: Bulls XV (2024–2025)
- Damian Willemse: Stormers XXIII (2020/21)
- Gene Willemse: Pumas (2023)
- Jaco Willemse: Griffons (2023)
- Stefan Willemse: Griquas (2020/21–2021)
- Devon Williams: Pumas (2020/21–2023), Bulls XV (2024–2026)
- Ethan Williams: Griffons (2023)
- Grant Williams: Sharks XV (2020/21–2021)
- Jaco Williams: Sharks XV (2024–2025)
- Marlyn Williams: Boland Cavaliers (2025–2026)
- Ludio Williams: Griffons (2023), Boland Cavaliers (2025)
- Kade Wolhuter: Stormers XXIII (2020/21–2023), Lions (2024–2025)
- Cameron Wright: Sharks XV (2020/21–2024)

== X ==
- Nama Xaba: Stormers XXIII (2021–2022), Bulls XV (2024–2026)
- Soso Xakalashe: Griffons (2023)
- Sango Xamlashe: Bulls XV (2021), Griquas (2022–2024), Pumas (2025–2026)
- Siba Xamlashe: Cheetahs (2023)

== Z ==
- Leolin Zas: Stormers XXIII (2021–2025)
- Fred Zeilinga: Lions (2021–2022), Sharks XV (2023)
- Mzwanele Zito: Griquas (2020/21–2022), Cheetahs (2023–2024)
- Siviwe Zondani: Sharks XV (2022)
- Mnombo Zwelendaba: Stormers XXIII (2022–2023), Griquas (2024–2026)
