= 2025 SA Cup =

South African rugby union competition

- Date: 7 March – 24 May 2025
- Champions: Pumas (1)
- Runners-up: Griquas
- Top point scorer: Danrich Visagie 112
- Top try scorer: Gurshwin Wehr 15

The 2025 SA Cup was the second edition of this annual domestic rugby union cup competition. The SA Cup is played between provincial teams in South Africa and the competition serves as qualification to the Currie Cup Premier Division and Currie Cup First Division respectively.

Danrich Visagie top scored in the tournament with 112 points and Gurshwin Wehr scored 15 tries.

== Competition ==
10 teams participated in the 2025 SA Cup, as in 2024. The top four teams qualified to join the four United Rugby Championship teams in the 2025 Currie Cup Premier Division and the remaining six teams battled it out for the 2025 Currie Cup First Division title.

== Standings ==
2025 SA Cup
Team	P	W	D	L	PF	PA	PD	TF	TA	Pts
Pumas	9	9	0	0	543	192	351	81	25	45
Griquas	9	8	0	1	533	184	349	80	26	42
Free State Cheetahs	9	6	0	3	502	227	275	77	30	34
Boland Cavaliers	9	5	0	4	413	232	181	59	33	32
Valke	9	6	0	3	337	350	−13	48	51	30
Griffons	9	4	0	5	354	307	47	53	44	26
Eastern Province	9	4	0	5	252	327	−75	34	46	21
Leopards	9	2	0	7	150	505	−355	19	77	10
SWD Eagles	9	1	0	8	202	474	−272	29	70	8
Border Bulldogs	9	0	0	9	142	630	−488	18	96	3

- Green background (rows 1 to 2) indicates qualification places for the SA Cup grand final and 2026 Currie Cup Premier Division.
- Blue background (rows 3 to 4) indicates other teams qualified for the 2026 Currie Cup Premier Division.
- Plain background (row 5-10) indicates other teams qualified for the 2026 Currie Cup First Division.

Source = springboks.rugby

== Teams ==
Location of teams in 2025 SA Cup

== Fixtures and results ==
=== Regular season ===
==== Round one ====
7 March 2025	Pumas	75–7	SWD Eagles	Mbombela Stadium, Mbombela
	Try: Sango Xamlashe (2), Darren Adonis, Wian van Niekerk (2), Eddie Swart (2), Ntsika Fisanti (2), Llewellyn Classen, Clinton Swart; Con: Swart (6), Danrich Visagie (4)	Report	Try: Sachin Toring; Con: Braam Abrahams

8 March 2025	Boland Cavaliers	45–29	Free State Cheetahs	Boland Stadium, Wellington
	Try: Lunathi Nxele (3), Sidney Tobias, Duren Hoffman; Con: Ashlon Davids (3), Garth April; Pen: Ashlon Davids (2), Garth April (2)	Report	Try: Jandre Nel (2), Prince Nkabinde, George Lourens, Pierre-Raymond Uys; Con: George Lourens, Cohen Jasper

8 March 2025	Border Bulldogs	32–55	Griffons	Sisa Dukashe Stadium, Mdantsane
	Try: Soso Xakalashe (2), Sakhe Dingile, Larry Nkonki; Con: Maxwell Klaasen (3); Pen: Maxwell Klaasen (2)	Report	Try: Simon Westraadt (3), Chris Hollis (2), Ulrich Stander, Quan Eymann, Andrew Kota; Con: Andrew Kota (6); Pen: Andrew Kota

8 March 2025	Valke	41–30	Eastern Province	Barnard Stadium, Kempton Park
	Try: Valentino Wellman, Sergio Stalmeester, Mbembe Payi, Zander van der Merwe, Wernich Aucamp; Con: Keagan Fortune (5); Pen: Keagan Fortune (2)	Report	Try: Rodney Damons (2), Troy Delport, Jayden Bantom; Con: Christian Humphries (2); Pen: Christian Humphries (2)

8 March 2025	Leopards	7–64	Griquas	Olen Park, Potchefstroom
	Try: Arminn Posthumus; Con: Shaun-Christian Baxter	Report	Try: Connor Mahoney (2), Carl Els (2), Tertius Kruger, Cameron Hufke, George Whitehead, Mnombo Zwelendaba, Marco de Witt, Gustav du Rand; Con: Tylor Sefoor (4), Whitehead (4)

==== Round two ====
14 March 2025	Free State Cheetahs	69–0	Leopards	Free State Stadium, Bloemfontein
	Try: Jandre Nel (4), Louis Van der Westhuizen (2), Daniel Maartens, Prince Nkabinde, Cohen Jasper, Raegan Oranje, Banie Britz; Con: Cohen Jasper (7)	Report

14 March 2025	SWD Eagles	48–22	Border Bulldogs	Outeniqua Park, George
	Try: Sachin Toring (2), Mpho Ntsane, Michael Cloete, Ethan Stuurman, Dian Basson, Clive Kruger, penalty try Con: Roshwin Abrahams (2), Sachin Toring	Report	Try: Kamvelihle Fatyela, Simthembile Zozi, Hlumelo Pantyo; Con: Maxwell Klaasen (2); Pen: Maxwell Klaasen

15 March 2025	Griffons	38–35	Boland Cavaliers	North West Stadium, Welkom
	Try: Simon Westraadt, Qamani Kota, Chris Hollis, Junior Banda, Lungi Mbiko; Con: Qamani Kota (5); Pen: Qamani Kota	Report	Try: Cornal Hendricks (2), Ashlon Davids, Keenan Opperman, Lunathi Nxele; Con: Ashlon Davids (5)

15 March 2025	Eastern Province	22–61	Pumas	Nelson Mandela Bay Stadium, Gqeberha
	Try: Rodney Damons, Shirwin Cupido, Jayden Bantom; Con: November, Chris Humphries; Pen: Chris Humphries	Report	Try: Ross Braude (3), Sango Xamlashe, Wian Van Niekerk, Ruwald Van der Merwe, Danrigh Visagie, Lundi Msenge, penalty try Con: Clinton Swart 5, Danrigh Visagie 2

15 March 2025	Griquas	68–15	Valke	Griqua Park, Kimberley
	Try: Gurswin Wehr (3), Gustav Du Rand (2), Dylan Maart (2), Cameron Hufke, Marco De Witt, Zane Bester; Con: Tylor Sefoor (5), George Whitehead (4)	Report

==== Round three ====
21 March 2025	SWD Eagles	26–39	Eastern Province	Outeniqua Park, George
	Try: Marco Fuhri, Damon Royle, Dian Basson, Clive Kruger; Con: Sachin Toring (2), Braam Abrahams	Report	Try: Siya Nzuzo, JJ Scheepers, Shirwin Cupido, Masikane Mazwi, Deon Plaatjies; Con: Christian Humphries (4); Pen: Christian Humphries (2)

21 March 2025	Border Bulldogs	3–118	Griquas	Sisa Dukashe Stadium, Mdantsane
	Pen: Maxwell Klaasen	Report	Try: Gurshwin Wehr (4), Dylan Maart (3), Gustav du Rand (3), Sako Makata (2), Dandre Delport (2), Athenkosi Khethani, Stephan Smit, Marco de Witt, Connor Mahoney; Con: Thomas Bursey (7), George Whitehead (6), Gurshwin Wehr

21 March 2025	Pumas	46–38	Free State Cheetahs	Mbombela Stadium, Mbombela
	Try: Jay Cee Nel (2), Ross Braude, Darren Adonis, Wian van Niekerk, Ntsika Fisanti, Clinton Swart; Con: Clinton Swart (3), Danrich Visagie; Pen: Danrich Visagie	Report	Try: Carl Wegner, Ali Mgijima, Neels Volschenk, Louis dan der Westhuizen, Michael Annies; Con: Cohen Jasper (5); Pen: Cohen Jasper

22 March 2025	Leopards	10–79	Griffons	Olen Park, Potchefstroom
	Try: Sylvester Hassien; Con: Andre Grobler; Pen: Charles Williams	Report	Try: Jandre de Beer (4), Kyle Cyster (2), Thomas Ongera (2), Richman Gora, Aphiwe Stemele, Rian Olivier, Chris Hollis, Andrew Kota; Con: Duan Pretorius, Andrew Kota (4), Aphiwe Stemele (3)

22 March 2025	Valke	43–26	Boland Cavaliers	Barnard Stadium, Kempton Park
	Try: Valentino Wellman (2), Abulele Ndabambi (2), Ezrick Alexander, Mbembe Payi; Con: Keagan Fortune (5); Pen: Keagan Fortune	Report	Try: Sidney Tobias, Lunathi Nxele (2), Michael Benadie; Con: Garth April (3)

==== Round four ====
29 March 2025	Valke	35–50	Pumas	Barnard Stadium, Kempton Park
		Report

29 March 2025	Boland	71–21	SWD Eagles	Boland Stadium, Wellington
		Report

29 March 2025	Border	25–28	Leopards	Sisa Dukashe Stadium, Mdantsane
		Report

29 March 2025	Griffons	33–52	Griquas	North West Stadium, Welkom
		Report

29 March 2025	Eastern Province	35–47	Free State Cheetahs	Nelson Mandela Bay Stadium, Gqeberha
		Report

==== Round five ====
4 April 2025	SWD Eagles	18–24	Valke	Outeniqua Park, George
		Report

4 April 2025	Pumas	110–7	Border Bulldogs	Mbombela Stadium, Mbombela
		Report

5 April 2025	Griquas	42–36	Boland Cavaliers	Griqua Park, Kimberley
		Report

5 April 2025	Free State Cheetahs	38–31	Griffons	Free State Stadium, Bloemfontein
		Report

5 April 2025	Eastern Province	26–17	Leopards	Nelson Mandela Bay Stadium, Gqeberha
		Report

==== Round six ====
11 April 2025	Griquas	70–17	Eastern Province	Griqua Park, Kimberley
		Report

12 April 2025	Leopards	10–80	Pumas	Olen Park, Potchefstroom
		Report

12 April 2025	Valke	45–40	Griffons	Barnard Stadium, Kempton Park
		Report

12 April 2025	Free State Cheetahs	87–15	SWD Eagles	Free State Stadium, Bloemfontein
		Report

12 April 2025	Border Bulldogs	3–52	Boland Cavaliers	Police Park, East London
		Report

==== Round seven ====
25 April 2025	Border Bulldogs	15–41	Eastern Province	Police Park, East London
		Report

25 April 2025	Pumas	39–34	Griquas	Mbombela Stadium, Mbombela
		Report

26 April 2025	Boland Cavaliers	80–0	Leopards	Boland Stadium, Wellington
		Report

26 April 2025	Griffons	57–27	SWD Eagles	North West Stadium, Welkom
		Report

14 March 2025	Free State Cheetahs	59–17	Valke	Free State Stadium, Bloemfontein
		Report

==== Round eight ====
2 May 2025	SWD Eagles	5–52	Griquas	Outeniqua Park, George
		Report

3 May 2025	Eastern Province	20–14	Griffons	Nelson Mandela Bay Stadium, Gqeberha
		Report

3 May 2025	Free State Cheetahs	106–7	Border	Free State Stadium, Bloemfontein
		Report

3 May 2025	Leopards	31–45	Valke	Olen Park, Potchefstroom
		Report

3 May 2025	Boland Cavaliers	32–34	Free State Cheetahs	Boland Stadium, Wellington
		Report

==== Round nine ====
10 May 2025	Griffons	7–50	Pumas	North West Stadium, Welkom
		Report

10 May 2025	Leopards	47–35	SWD Eagles	Olen Park, Potchefstroom
		Report

10 May 2025	Valke	72–28	Border	Barnard Stadium, Kempton Park
		Report

10 May 2025	Griquas	31–29	Free State Cheetahs	Griqua Park, Kimberley
		Report

10 May 2025	Eastern Province	22–36	Boland Cavaliers	Madibaz Stadium, Gqeberha
		Report

=== Semi-finals ===
16 May 2025	Pumas	31–29	Boland Cavaliers	Mbombela Stadium, Mbombela
19:00		Report		Referee: Sean Muller

17 May 2025	Griquas	41–38	Free State Cheetahs	Griqua Park, Kimberley
15:00		Report		Referee: Dylen November

=== Grand Final ===
24 May 2025	Pumas	39–14	Griquas	Mbombela Stadium, Nelspruit
	Try: Xamlashe (2); Swart; Engelbrecht; Maritz; Con: Visagie (4); Pen: Visagie (2)	Report	Try: Wehr; Zwelendaba; Con: Whitehead (2)	Referee: Stephan Geldenhuys

Pumas:
FB	15	Tino Swanepoel
RW	14	Lundi Msenge
OC	13	Sango Xamlashe
IC	12	Wian van Niekerk
LW	11	Darren Adonis
FH	10	Danrich Visagie
SH	9	Ross Braude
N8	8	Willie Engelbrecht
BF	7	Ruwald van der Merwe
OF	6	Ntsika Fisanti
RL	5	Jeandré Leonard
LL	4	Heinz Bertram
TP	3	Sampie Swiegers
HK	2	Eduan Swart
LP	1	Etienne Janeke
Substitutes:
HK	16	Darnell Osuagwu
PR	17	Stephan de Jager
PR	18	Dewald Maritz
BR	19	Kwanda Dimaza
BR	20	André Fouche
FH	21	Clinton Swart
CE	22	Jay-Cee Nel
FB	23	Stefan Coetzee
	Coach: Jimmy Stonehouse

Griquas:
FB	15	Cameron Hufke
RW	14	Dylan Maart
OC	13	Zane Bester
IC	12	Mnombo Zwelendaba
LW	11	Gurshwin Wehr
FH	10	George Whitehead
SH	9	Thomas Bursey
N8	8	Gustav Erlank
BF	7	Marco de Witt
OF	6	Lourens Oosthuizen
RL	5	Albert Liebenberg
LL	4	Dylan Sjoblom
TP	3	Cebo Dlamini
HK	2	Janco Uys
LP	1	Leon Lyons
Substitutes:
HK	16	Gustav du Rand
PR	17	Eddie Davids
PR	18	Junior Banda
LK	19	Athenkosi Khethani
BR	20	Phumzile Maqondwana
SH	21	Bobby Alexander
CE	22	Tyler Sefoor
CE	23	Tom Nel
Coach: Pieter Bergh

Assistant Referees:

Television match official:

== See also ==
- Rugby union in South Africa
- Currie Cup
- Mzanzi Challenge
- SuperSport Rugby Challenge
- Vodacom Cup
- Bankfin Nite Series
