= 2024 SA Cup =

Domestic rugby union competition

- Champions: Griquas
- Top point scorer: George Whitehead (150)
- Top try scorer: Darnell Osuagwu (11)

The 2024 SA Cup was the first edition of the SA Cup, created to replace the Mzanzi Challenge.

The competition was contested between 21 March 2024 and 25 May 2024, and served as qualification to the Currie Cup Premier Division and Currie Cup First Division respectively.

The domestic teams with an equivalent team competing in the United Rugby Championship, namely the Blue Bulls, Western Province, Sharks and Golden Lions are excluded from the SA Cup.

Griquas beat the Pumas 46-24 in the final to take the first SA Cup title.

George Whitehead top scored in the tournament with 150 points and Darnell Osuagwu scored 11 tries.

== Teams ==
SA Cup teams
Team	Sponsored name
Boland Cavaliers	Sanlam Boland Cavaliers
Border Bulldogs	Border Bulldogs
Eastern Province Elephants	Eastern Province Elephants
Free State XV	Toyota Free State XV
Griffons	Down Touch Griffons
Griquas	Suzuki Griquas
Leopards	Leopards
Pumas	Airlink Pumas
SWD Eagles	Phangela SWD Eagles
Valke	Hino Valke

Location of teams in 2024 SA Cup

== Standings ==
2024 SA Cup
Team	P	W	D	L	PF	PA	PD	TF	TA	Pts
Griquas	9	9	0	0	577	173	404	85	21	45
Pumas	9	8	0	1	488	80	408	70	12	41
Griffons	9	7	0	2	329	273	56	48	40	35
Free State Cheetahs	9	6	0	3	394	208	186	61	30	32
Boland Cavaliers	9	5	0	4	345	260	85	49	37	27
Valke	9	3	0	6	276	400	−124	39	59	18
Leopards	9	3	0	6	215	458	−243	33	71	16
SWD Eagles	9	2	0	7	248	391	−143	39	56	15
Eastern Province	9	2	0	7	203	374	−171	28	54	14
Border Bulldogs	9	0	0	9	105	563	−458	13	85	0

- Green background (rows 1 to 2) indicates qualification places for the SA Cup grand final and 2025 Currie Cup Premier Division.
- Blue background (rows 3 to 4) indicates other teams qualified for the 2025 Currie Cup Premier Division.
- Plain background (row 5-10) indicates other teams qualified for the 2025 Currie Cup First Division.

Source = springboks.rugby

== Fixtures and results ==
=== Regular season ===
==== Round one ====
Round one

21 March 2024	Griquas	88–0	Leopards	Griqua Park, Kimberley
	Try: Janco Uys, Stephan Smit, Sako Makata (2), Tertius Kruger, Sango Xamlashe, Marcqiewn Titus (4), Thomas Bursey, Connor Mahoney (2), George Whitehead; Con: George Whitehead (6), Lubabalo Dobela (3)	Report

22 March 2024	SWD Eagles	22–43	Pumas	Outeniqua Park, George
	Try: Liko Ndiyalwa, Mpho Ntsane (2), Joshua Vermeulen; Con: Jade Stoffels	Report	Try: Llewellyn Classen (2), Sampie Swiegers, Andre Fouche, Tino Swanepoel, Etienne Janeke, Giovan Snyman; Con: Clinton Swart (3), Brandon Thomson

22 March 2024	Free State Cheetahs	38–7	Boland Cavaliers	Free State Stadium, Bloemfontein
	Try: Gideon van der Merwe, Ali Mgijima, Marnus van der Merwe (2), Sbu Nkosi, Sibabalwe Xamlashe; Con: Ruan Pienaar (4)	Report	Try: Thurlow Marsh; Con: Darian Hock

23 March 2024	Eastern Province	31–27	Valke	Isaac Wolfson Stadium, Ibhayi
	Try: Lubabalo Mtyanda, Athenkosi Manentsa, Davian Swanepoel, Gerrit Huisamen; Con: Darryle Kameel (4); Pen: Darryle Kameel	Report	Try: Musa Tshabalala (2), Mosolwa Mafuma, Sergio Stalmeester; Con: Keagan Fortune (2); Pen: Keagan Fortune

24 March 2024	Griffons	52–8	Border Bulldogs	North West Stadium, Welkom
	Try: Domenic Smit (3), Dandre Delport, Duren Hoffman, Gurshwin Wehr, Michael Benadie, HP van Schoor; Con: Jaywinn Juries (3), Danrich Visagie (3)	Report	Try: Awonke Sondishe; Pen: Layron Milborrow

==== Round two ====
Round two

28 March 2024	Valke	25–66	Griquas	Barnard Stadium, Kempton Park
	Try: Kayden Kiewit, Thabo Ntunja, Anrich Richter; Con: Keagan Fortune (2); Pen: Keagan Fortune (2)	Report	Try: Thabo Ndimande (2), Stephan Smit, Thomas Bursey, Dylan Maart, Sango Xamlashe, Marcqiewn Titus, Cameron Hufke, Sean Swart, Kudzwai Dube; Con: Lubabalo Dobela (5), George Whitehead (3)

29 March 2024	Pumas	61–0	Eastern Province	Mbombela Stadium, Mbombela
	Try: Jaco Labuschagne (2), Darnell Osuagwu (2), Dewald Maritz, Ross Braude, Tino Swanepoel, Llewellyn Classen, Giovan Snyman; Con: Clinton Swart (8)	Report

30 March 2024	Border Bulldogs	25–40	SWD Eagles	Sisa Dukashe Stadium, Mdantsane
	Try: Luphumlo Mbiko, Onke Dubase, Simuthembile Ntleki; Con: Merlin Du Plessis, Layron Milborrow; Pen: Layron Milborrow (2)	Report	Try: Damon Royle (2), Deon Carstens, Thoubaan Gabriels, Mpho Ntsane, Penalty Try; Con: Jade Stoffels (4)

30 March 2024	Leopards	5–76	Free State Cheetahs	Olen Park, Potchefstroom
	Try: Cohen Wortley	Report	Try: Munier Hartzenberg (2), Sbu Nkosi (2), Gideon van der Merwe (2), Oupa Mohoje (2), Andy Ntsila (2), Marnus van der Merwe, Sibabalwe Xamlashe; Con: Reinhardt Fortuin (6), Andell Loubser (2)

30 March 2024	Boland Cavaliers	31–34	Griffons	Boland Stadium, Wellington
	Try: Emile Booysen, Chriswill September, Cornell Engelbrecht, Xavier Mitchell, Riaan Louw; Con: Darian Hock (3)	Report	Try: Dandre Delport (2), Soso Xakalashe, Domenic Smit (2); Con: Danrich Visagie (3); Pen: Danrich Visagie

==== Round three ====
Round three

5 April 2024	Free State Cheetahs	0–50	Pumas	Free State Stadium, Bloemfontein
		Report	Try: Llewellyn Classen (2), Stefan Coetzee (2), Darnell Osuagwu (2), Ross Braude; Con: Clinton Swart (6); Pen: Clinton Swart

6 April 2024	Griquas	119–5	Border Bulldogs	Griqua Park, Kimberley
	Try: Carl Els (3), George Whitehead (3), Dylan Maart (3), Willem van der Walt (2), Athenkosi Khethani, Niel Otto, Xavier Swartbooi, Connor Mahoney, Bingo Ivanisevic, Sango Xamlashe; Con: George Whitehead (17)	Report	Try: Simthembile Ntleki

6 April 2024	Boland Cavaliers	29–13	Valke	Boland Stadium, Wellington
	Try: Thurlow Marsh, Jurick Lewis, Riaan Louw, Bentley Geldenhuys; Con: Garth April (3); Pen: Garth April	Report	Try: Eddie Evans; Con: Keagan Fortune; Pen: Keagan Fortune (2)

6 April 2024	Eastern Province	23–24	SWD Eagles	Isaac Wolfson Stadium, Ibhayi
	Try: Sithembiso Befile, Penalty Try; Con: Darryle Kameel; Pen: Ruben de Vos (3)	Report	Try: Ethan Stuurman, Stone Cloete, Rosco Syster (2); Con: Joshua Vermeulen, Jade Stoffels

7 April 2024	Griffons	42–10	Leopards	North West Stadium, Welkom
	Try: Domenic Smit, Duren Hoffman, Wikus Nieuwenhuis, Chadley Wenn, Danrich Visagie, Penalty Try; Con: Danrich Visagie (5)	Report	Try: Buhle Qaba; Con: Marius Viviers; Pen: Marius Viviers

==== Round four ====
Round four

12 April 2024	Pumas	89–3	Valke	Mbombela Stadium, Mbombela
	Try: Phiko Sobahle (3), Jan-Henning Campher (2), Andre Fouche, Darnell Osuagwu, Etienne Janeke, Theuns Pretorius, Ross Braude, Ruwald van der Merwe, Wian van Niekerk, Lundi Msenge; Con: Clinton Swart (8), Brandon Thomson (4)	Report	Pen: Keagan Fortune

13 April 2024	Leopards	57–15	Border Bulldogs	Olen Park, Potchefstroom
	Try: Mncedisi Dlwengu (2), Buhle Qaba (2), Ruben Du Plessis, Shirwin Cupido, Marius Viviers, Gilroy Philander, Siniothando Tshontsyi; Con: Marius Viviers (6)	Report	Try: Merlin du Plessis (2); Con: Merlin du Plessis; Pen: Merlin du Plessis

13 April 2024	Free State Cheetahs	59–26	Eastern Province	Free State Stadium, Bloemfontein
	Try: Litha Nkula (2), John Lourens (2), Victor Sekekete, Munier Hartzenberg, Banie Britz, Tapiwa Mafura, Sisonke Vumazonke; Con: Andell Loubser (7)	Report	Try: Siya Nzuzo, Lungi Mbiko, Sherwin Slater, Riaan Arends; Con: Ruben de Vos (3)

13 April 2024	Griquas	61–17	Griffons	Griqua Park, Kimberley
	Try: Thomas Bursey, Sako Makata, Tertius Kruger, Connor Mahoney, Cameron Hufke, Cebo Dlamini, Athenkosi Khethani, Xavier Swartbooi, Penalty Try; Con: Lubabalo Dobela (4), George Whitehead (3)	Report	Try: Duren Hoffman, Domenic Smit; Con: Danrich Visagie (2); Pen: Danrich Visagie

14 April 2024	SWD Eagles	5–35	Boland Cavaliers	Outeniqua Park, George
	Try: Mpho Ntsane	Report	Try: Keenan Opperman (2), Cornell Engelbrecht, Riaan Louw, Sidney Tobias; Con: Garth April (2); Pen: Garth April (2)

==== Round five ====
Round 5

20 April 2024	Leopards	43–26	Eastern Province	Olen Park, Potchefstroom
	Try: Henro-Pierre Swart, Shirwin Cupido, Gilroy Philander, Keenan Twigg, Christo Willemse, Christiaan Gates; Con: Marius Viviers (5); Pen: Marius Viviers	Report	Try: Riaan Arends, Davian Swanepoel, Sanwell Jacobs, Marvin Kampher; Con: Ruben de Vos (2), Sanwell Jacobs

20 April 2024	Boland Cavaliers	30–48	Griquas	Boland Stadium, Wellington
	Try: Cornell Engelbrecht, Xavier Mitchell, Bentley Geldenhuys; Con: Garth April (3); Pen: Garth April (3)	Report	Try: Carl Els (2), Janco Uys, Stephan Smit, Thomas Bursey, Cameron Hufke, Niel Otto; Con: Lubabalo Dobela (4), George Whitehead; Pen: Lubabalo Dobela

20 April 2024	Border Bulldogs	0–56	Pumas	Police Park, East London
		Report	Try: Darnell Osuagwu (2), Jan-Henning Campher, Giovan Snyman, Gene Willemse, Zeilinga Strydom, De-an Ackermann, Andrew Kota; Con: PJ Jacobs (6), Diego Swartz (2)

20 April 2024	Valke	63–31	SWD Eagles	Barnard Stadium, Kempton Park
	Try: Valentino Wellman (2), Cohen Kiewit, Luciano Elias, Yanga Hlalu, Easton Arendse, Kelvin Kanenungo, Anrich Richter; Con: Sergio Stalmeester (4), Andrew van Wyk, Anrich Richter (3); Pen: Sergio Stalmeester (3)	Report	Try: Thoubaan Gabriels (2), Rosco Syster (2), Jade Stoffels; Con: Marlo Weich (2), Sachin Toring

21 April 2024	Griffons	36–33	Free State Cheetahs	North West Stadium, Welkom
	Try: Dandre Delport, Carel-Jan Coetzee, Jaywinn Juries, Thomas Ongera, Penalty Try; Con: Danrich Visagie (3); Pen: Danrich Visagie	Report	Try: Dan Kasende (2), Friedle Olivier, Gideon van der Merwe, Tapiwa Mafura; Con: Ruan Pienaar (2), Abner van Reenen, George Lourens

==== Round six ====
Round six

26 April 2024	Eastern Province	0–50	Griquas	Central Rugby Field, Kariega
		Report	Try: Marco de Witt (2), Bobby Alexander (2), Albert Liebenberg, Niel Otto, Connor Mahoney, Dylan Maart; Con: George Whitehead (5)

27 April 2024	SWD Eagles	14–46	Free State Cheetahs	Outeniqua Park, George
	Try: Liko Ndiyalwa, Mpho Ntsane; Con: Sachin Toring, Jade Stoffels	Report	Try: Louis van der Westhuizen (2), Schalk Ferreira, Lewis Jones, Sbu Nkosi, James Verity-Amm, Vernon Paulo, Andell Loubser; Con: Abner van Reenen (3)

27 April 2024	Pumas	71–10	Leopards	Nelspruit Rugby Club, Mbombela
	Try: Stefan Coetzee (3), Tino Swanepoel (3), Ruwald van der Merwe (2), Ross Braude, Theuns Pretorius, Darnell Osuagwu; Con: Clinton Swart (7), Brandon Thomson	Report	Try: Chris Vermaak, Chyle van Zyl

27 April 2024	Boland Cavaliers	106–7	Border Bulldogs	Boland Stadium, Wellington
	Try: Taine-Randall Booysen (3), Erik Lambrecht (3), Xavier Mitchell (3), Bentley Geldenhuys (2), Neil Rautenbach, Gift Dlamini, Andre Manuel, Jason Beukes, Durin Nasson; Con: Darian Hock (7), Garth April (6)	Report	Try: Lwandile Mapuko; Con: Lwandile Mapuko

28 April 2024	Griffons	53–40	Valke	North West Stadium, Welkom
	Try: Duren Hoffman (2), Dandre Delport (3), Domenic Smit, Mthokozisi Gumede, Soso Xakalashe; Con: Danrich Visagie (5); Drop: Domenic Smit	Report	Try: Zander van der Merwe, Sergio Stalmeester (2), Andrew van Wyk, Ezrick Alexander (2); Con: Sergio Stalmeester (5)

==== Round seven ====
Round seven

3 May 2024	Griquas	31–26	Pumas	Griqua Park, Kimberley
	Try: Thabo Ndimande, Cameron Hufke, Lubabalo Dobela, Penalty try Con: George Whitehead (3); Pen: George Whitehead	Report	Try: Ross Braude, Theuns Pretorius; Con: Clinton Swart (2); Pen: Clinton Swart (4)

4 May 2024	SWD Eagles	28–36	Griffons	Outeniqua Park, George
	Try: Heinrich Roelfse, Mpho Ntsane, JP Duvenage, Sachin Toring; Con: Joshua Vermeulen (4)	Report	Try: Micheal Benadie, Thomas Ongera, obbie Petzer, Domenic Smit, Dandre Delport; Con: Danrich Visagie (4); Pen: Danrich Visagie

4 May 2024	Leopards	26–59	Boland Cavaliers	Leeudoringstad Rugby Club
	Try: Mncedisi Dlwengu (2), Sanele Zungu, Charles Williams; Con: Charles Williams (3)	Report	Try: Thurlow Marsh, Bentley Geldenhuys (5), Xavier Mitchell, Riaan Louw, Gavern Skippers; Con: Garth April (7)

4 May 2024	Eastern Province	38–17	Border Bulldogs	Isaac Wolfson Stadium, Ibhayi
	Try: Temba Boltina, Mbembe Payi (3), Aya Oliphant, Luxolo Koza; Con: Darryle Kameel (2), Ruben de Vos (2)	Report	Try: Lwandile Mapuko; Pen: Merlin du Plessis (4)

4 May 2024	Valke	17–68	Free State Cheetahs	Barnard Stadium, Kempton Park
	Try: Godfrey Muzanargwo, Anrich Richter (2); Con: Sergio Stalmeester	Report	Try: Marnus van der Merwe, Mzwanele Zito, Sibabalo Qoma, Munier Hartzenberg (2), Sbu Nkosi, Tapiwa Mafura, Rethabile Mzamo (2), Gideon van der Merwe; Con: Andell Loubser (9)

==== Round eight ====
Round eight

10 May 2024	Border Bulldogs	14–57	Free State Cheetahs	Police Park, East London
	Try: Simuthembile Ntleki, Sakhekile Dingile; Con: Merlin du Plesis (2)	Report	Try: Louis van der Westhuizen, Pierre-Raymond Uys, Mzwanele Zito, Litha Nkula, Jooste Nel, Andell Loubser, Marnus van der Merwe, Ruan Pienaar, Tapiwa Mafura; Con: Ethan Wentzel (3), Loubser (2), Ruan Pienaar

10 May 2024	Pumas	49–0	Boland Cavaliers	Mbombela Stadium, Mbombela
	Try: Ruwald van der Merwe, Kwanda Dimaza, Clinton Swart, Lundi Msenge, De-an Ackermann, Stefan Coetzee (2); Con: Clinton Swart (6), Gene Willemse	Report

11 May 2024	Valke	50–19	Leopards	Barnard Stadium, Kempton Park
	Try: Pierre Rabie, Zingisa April, Ezrick Alexander (2), Valentino Wellman (3), Anrich Richter; Con: Sergio Stalmeester (2), Anrich Richter (3)	Report	Try: Charles Williams, Naiden Jaarts (2); Con: Charles Williams (2)

11 May 2024	Griquas	75–53	SWD Eagles	Griqua Park, Kimberley
	Try: Janco Uys, Carl Els, Sako Makata, Zane Bester (3), Connor Mahoney, Cameron Hufke (3), Mnombo Zwelendaba; Con: George Whitehead (10)	Report	Try: Uzile Tele, Stone Cloete, Deon Carstens, Rosco Syster (2), Wayne Khan, Penalty try (2); Con: Sachin Toring, Joshua Vermeulen, Marlo Weich; Pen: Joshua Vermeulen

12 May 2024	Griffons	45–19	Eastern Province	North West Stadium, Welkom
	Try: HP van Schoor, Rian Olivier, Richman Gora, Gurshwin Wehr, Randy Fillies, Duren Hoffman (2); Con: Danrich Visagie 5	Report	Try: Jayden Bantom, Mbembe Payi (2); Con: Ruben de Vos (2)

==== Round nine ====
Round nine

17 May 2024	Free State Cheetahs	17–39	Griquas	Shimla Park, Bloemfontein
	Try: Daniel Kasende, Rewan Kruger; Con: Ruan Pienaar (2); Pen: Ruan Pienaar	Report	Try: Cameron Hufke (2), Janco Uys, Sako Makata, Stephan Smit; Con: George Whitehead (3), Lubabalo Dobela; Pen: George Whitehead; Drop: George Whitehead

17 May 2024	Pumas	43–14	Griffons	Mbombela Stadium, Mbombela
	Try: Darnell Osuagwu (2), Ruwald van der Merwe, Kwanda Dimaza, Stefan Coetzee, Penalty Try; Con: Clinton Swart (4); Pen: Clinton Swart	Report	Try: Ludio Williams, Randy Fillies; Con: Danrich Visagie (2)

18 May 2024	SWD Eagles	31–45	Leopards	Outeniqua Park, George
	Try: Dian Basson, Sachin Toring, Mpho Ntsane, Rosco Syster, Clyde Lewis; Con: Deon Carstens (2), Rosco Syster	Report	Try: Henro-Pierre Swart (2), Chris Vermaak, Gilroy Philander, Tjaart Benade, Naiden Jaarts, Charles Williams; Con: Charles Williams (5)

18 May 2024	Boland Cavaliers	48–40	Eastern Province	Rhino Park, Piketberg
	Try: Gavern Skippers, Xavier Mitchell, Gerrit Bester, Marlyn Williams, Carl Francois Truter, Penalty Try; Con: Darian Hock (5); Pen: Darian Hock (2)	Report	Try: Jay-dee Jooste (2), Sherwin Slater, Aya Oliphant, Temba Boltina; Con: Jayden Bantom (3); Pen: Jayden Bantom (3)

19 May 2024	Border Bulldogs	14–38	Valke	Police Park, East London
	Try: Chuma Biyana, Ryan Maree; Con: Merlin du Plessis (2)	Report	Try: Luciano Elias (2), Eddie Evans, Zander van der Merwe, Sergio Stalmeester, Valentino Wellman; Con: Sergio Stalmeester (4)

=== Grand Final ===
25 May 2024	Griquas	46–24	Pumas	Griqua Park, Kimberley
	Try: Makata; Hufke; Whitehead; Du Rand; Alexander; Penalty try Con: Whitehead (4); Pen: Whitehead (2)	Report	Try: Willemse; Osuagwu; Msenge; Penalty try Con: Willemse (1)	Referee: Christopher Allison

== See also ==
- Rugby union in South Africa
- Currie Cup
- Mzanzi Challenge
- SuperSport Rugby Challenge
- Vodacom Cup
- Bankfin Nite Series
