= Mafu =

Mafu may refer to:

- Khwezi Mafu (born 1998), South African rugby player
- Kibonge Mafu (born 1945), Congolese football player
- Nocawe Mafu, South African politician
- Ma Fu, or Mafu, a 3rd-century B.C. district of China administered by the bureaucrat Zhao She

== See also ==
- Mǎ Fù, in Chinese constellations, one of the Southern Asterisms
