= ABSA Stadium (disambiguation) =

ABSA Stadium may refer to:

- Kings Park Stadium, a stadium in Durban, South Africa that was previously known as ABSA Stadium
- Buffalo City Stadium, a stadium in East London, South Africa that was previously known as ABSA Stadium
- Griqua Park, a stadium in Kimberley, South Africa that was previously known as ABSA Park
