= Christopher Allison =

Christopher Allison may refer to:

- C. FitzSimons Allison
- Christopher Allison (rugby union referee)
