= Paschal Ekeji =

South African rugby player (born 2002)

No. 54 – New York Jets
- Position: Defensive end
- Roster status: Practice squad

Personal information
- Born: March 19, 2002 (age 24); Maseru, Lesotho
- Listed height: 6 ft 4 in (1.93 m)
- Listed weight: 230 lb (104 kg)

Career history
- New York Jets (2025–present)*
- * Offseason or practice squad member only
- Stats at Pro Football Reference

Paschal Ekeji
- Born: 19 March 2002 (age 24) Lesotho
- Height: 1.93 m (6 ft 4 in)
- Weight: 94 kg (207 lb)
- School: Grey College
- University: Stellenbosch University

Rugby union career
- Position: Wing
Senior career
| Years | Team | Apps | (Points) |
| 2020–2023 | Western Province | 2 | |
| 2025 | Sharks XV | 2 | (0) |

Paschal Hans Uzoma Ekeji Jr. (born March 19, 2002) is a Lesotho-born American football defensive end of Nigerian descent for the New York Jets of the National Football League (NFL) as a member of the Formerly part of the International Player Pathway program. He is a former rugby union footballer who played as a winger for Sharks XV in South Africa.

== Early life ==
He is originally from Nigeria but grew up in Bloemfontein and played for Grey College and played rugby union for Free State in the Craven Week. He then attended Stellenbosch University.

== Career ==
=== Rugby Union ===
He was recruited by Western Province in 2020. He played for Western Province U20 in the U20 Cup in the 2021-22 season. That season, he also featured the senior Western Province side in the Toyota Challenge. He went on to make his senior debut in the 2022 Currie Cup Premier Division for Western Province, making his debut against Lions in January 2022. However, his progress was halted by a knee ligament injury which ruled him out of action for a year.

=== NFL ===
In June 2022, he attended the first NFL Africa Camp in Accra, Ghana. He was described as a "6-foot-4, 210 pounds" and a potential wide receiver who "looked the part in every way…the size, [he] was smooth in and out of his breaks and…very coachable". In December 2024, he was announced as joining the NFL's International Player Pathway scheme.

=== Return to Rugby ===
Having failed to secure an NFL contract, Ekeji returned to rugby, signing with the Sharks ahead of the 2025 Currie Cup Premier Division. Ekeji made his debut for the Sharks in the fourth round, against Griquas.

=== New York Jets (NFL) ===
Pre-draft measurables
| Height | Weight | Arm length | Hand span | Wingspan | 40-yard dash | Three-cone drill | Vertical jump | Broad jump | Bench press |
|---|---|---|---|---|---|---|---|---|---|
| 6 ft 4 1/2 in (1.94 m) | 233 lb (106 kg) | 34 5/8 in (0.88 m) | 10 1/8 in (0.26 m) | 6 ft 10 in (2.08 m) | 4.75 s | 7.29 s | 33.5 in (0.85 m) | 9 ft 9 in (2.97 m) | 21 reps |
All values from Pro Day

On November 27, 2025, Ekeji signed with the New York Jets' practice squad as a defensive end. He signed a reserve/future contract with New York on January 5, 2026.

On August 30, 2026, Ekeji was waived by the Jets as a part of final roster cuts; he was re-signed to the team's practice squad the following day.

== Personal life ==
His younger brother Pretorius Ekeji is also a rugby union player.. Ekeji has the citizenships of Lesotho, Nigeria, and South Africa.
