= 2025 Currie Cup First Division =

Domestic rugby union competition

- Countries: South Africa
- Date: – 26 July
- Champions: Griffons (6th title)
- Runners-up: Valke

The 2025 Currie Cup First Division was the 87th edition of the Currie Cup. As the second-tier of the competition, it ran alongside the 2025 Currie Cup Premier Division. It was sponsored by beer brand Carling Black Label and organised by the South African Rugby Union.

The 2025 SA Cup determined which teams participated, with the top four joining the United Rugby Championship teams in the 2025 Currie Cup Premier Division, and the bottom six playing in the First Division.

The 2024 champions, Boland Cavaliers, played in the 2025 Currie Cup Premier Division, so 2025 saw a new champion.

After four rounds, five of the six teams were still in contention for the semi-finals.

The Valke and the Griffons qualified for the final, with the Griffons winning 51–44 after the game went into extra time following a 37–37 stalemate at full time.

== Teams ==
Location of teams in the 2025 Currie Cup First Division - not including the international Mzansi Challenge participants

The six competing teams are:

2025 Currie Cup First Division
Team	Sponsored name
Border Bulldogs	Border Bulldogs
Eastern Province Elephants	Eastern Province
Valke	Valke
Griffons	Novavit Griffons
Leopards	Leopards
SWD Eagles	Phangela SWD Eagles

=== Standings ===
2025 Currie Cup First Division standings
Pos	Team	Pld	W	D	L	PF	PA	PD	TF	TA	TB	LB	Pts	Qualification
1	Valke	5	5	0	0	195	94	+101	29	14	0	0	24	Semi-Final
2	Griffons	5	4	0	1	271	127	+144	40	18	0	0	21	Semi-Final
3	Eastern Province Elephants	5	3	0	2	149	160	−11	23	22	0	0	16	Semi-Final
4	Leopards	5	2	0	3	125	182	−57	19	28	0	0	11	Semi-Final
5	SWD Eagles	5	1	0	4	140	185	−45	22	27	0	0	10	
6	Border Bulldogs	5	0	0	5	105	237	−132	13	37	0	0	2	

Source: springboks.rugby
Rules for classification: Tournament points in the standings were awarded to teams as follows:
- 4 points for a win.
- 2 points for a draw.
- 1 bonus point for a loss in a match by seven points or under.
- 1 bonus point for scoring four tries or more.
Teams were ranked in the standings firstly by tournament points then by: (a) points difference from all matches (points scored less points conceded); (b) tries difference from all matches (tries scored less tries conceded); (c) points difference from the matches between the tied teams; (d) points scored in all matches; (e) tries scored in all matches; and, if needed, (f) a coin toss.

=== Semi-finals ===
19 July 2025	Griffons	48–20	Eastern Province	North West Stadium, Welkom
15:00		Report

19 July 2025	Valke	55–12	Leopards	Barnard Stadium, Kempton Park
15:00		Report

=== Final ===
26 July 2025	Valke	44–51 (a.e.t.)	Griffons	Barnard Stadium, Kempton Park
15:00	Try: Alexander (2); Pretorius; Payi; Wellman; Con: Fortune (4); Stalmeester; Pen: Fortune (2); Stalmeester	Report	Try: Pretorius (2); Gray; Syster; De Beer; Vers; Stander; Con: Kota (5); Pen: Kota (2)	Referee: Lulutho Matomela

== See also ==
- 2025 Currie Cup Premier Division
- 2025 SA Cup
