= Dylan Sjoblom =

South African rugby union player

- Born: 8 August 2000 (age 26) Nelspruit, South Africa
- Height: 200 cm (6 ft 7 in)
- Weight: 115 kg (254 lb; 18 st 2 lb)
- School: Hoërskool Bergvlam
- University: University of the Free State

Rugby union career
- Position: Lock
- Current team: Lions / Golden Lions
Senior career
Years	Team	Apps	(Points)
2023–2024	Griquas		
2023	Stormers	1	(0)
2025–	Golden Lions	17	(10)
2025–	Lions	9	(0)
- Correct as of 3 November 2026

Dylan Sjoblom (born 8 August 2000) is a South African rugby union player, who plays for the Lions and Golden Lions. His preferred position is lock.

== Early career ==
Sjoblom was born in Nelspruit and attended the University of the Free State. He attended Hoërskool Bergvlam where he played cricket as well as rugby.

== Professional career ==
Sjoblom joined the Griquas ahead of the 2023 Currie Cup Premier Division, representing the side in the competition. Following the competition, he went on loan to the Stormers, and debuted for the side against the Leicester Tigers. He returned to the Griquas in 2024, helping them win the 2024 SA Cup, although missed out in the final. After playing for the Griquas in the 2024 Currie Cup, he again returned on loan to the Stormers, before returning to the Griquas for the 2025 SA Cup. He joined the Lions in June 2025, representing the side in the 2025 Currie Cup Premier Division. He would then debut for the Lions in round one of the 2025–26 United Rugby Championship against Cardiff.
