= Dylan Maart =

South African rugby union player

- Born: 3 September 1996 (age 30) Wellington, South Africa
- Height: 185 cm (6 ft 1 in)
- Weight: 77 kg (170 lb; 12 st 2 lb)
- School: Klein Nederburg

Rugby union career
- Position: Wing
- Current team: Stormers / Griquas
Senior career
Years	Team	Apps	(Points)
2021–2023	Boland Cavaliers		
2024–	Griquas		
2025–	Stormers	4	(20)
- Correct as of 20 December 2025

Dylan Maart (born 3 September 1996) is a South African rugby union player, who plays for the Stormers and Griquas. His preferred position is wing.

== Early career ==
Maart played rugby at primary school, however stopped playing the game due to issues at home. He played his club rugby for Young Standards RFC in Paarl and attended Klein Nederburg in the city. He has worked as both a taxi guard and in a bottling plant warehouse.

== Professional career ==
Maart was on the fringes of the Boland Cavaliers squad in 2021 and 2022, representing them in the Currie Cup First Division before turning professional in 2023. In 2023, he helped Boland win the 2023 Currie Cup First Division, before signing for the Griquas ahead of the 2024 Currie Cup Premier Division, and helped them win the 2024 SA Cup. He represented the Griquas again in the 2025 Currie Cup Premier Division, where they won the competition. Following the competition, he joined up with the Stormers to train. In November 2025, he officially joined the Stormers on loan, debuting against Munster.

== Honours ==
- Currie Cup First Division champion 2023
- SA Cup runner up 2025
