= Donavan Don =

South African rugby union player

- Full name: Donavan Don
- Born: 18 February 2002 (age 24) Upington, South Africa
- Height: 176 cm (5 ft 9 in)
- Weight: 78 kg (172 lb)
- School: Louwville High School, Velddrif, Western Cape
- University: Cape Peninsula University of Technology

Rugby union career
- Position: Wing
- Current team: Sharks
Senior career
Years	Team	Apps	(Points)
2025–2026	Boland Cavaliers	8	(45)
2027–	Sharks		
- Correct as of 25 July 2026
International career
Years	Team	Apps	(Points)
2023–2026	South Africa Sevens	17	(128)
- Correct as of 25 July 2026

Donavan Don (born 18 February 2002) is a South African rugby union player who currently plays for the Sharks in the United Rugby Championship and the South Africa national rugby sevens team.
