= Gurshwin Wehr =

South African rugby union player

- Full name: Gurshwin Nikhole Wehr
- Born: 8 September 1998 (age 28) Worcester, South Africa
- Height: 185 cm (6 ft 1 in)
- Weight: 85 kg (187 lb; 13 st 5 lb)
- School: Worcester Gymnasium
- Notable relative: Wendal Wehr (brother)

Rugby union career
- Position: Wing
- Current team: Sale Sharks / Griquas
Senior career
Years	Team	Apps	(Points)
2020–2024	Griffons		
2024	Sharks	1	(0)
2025–	Griquas		
2025–	Sale Sharks	2	(0)
- Correct as of 20 December 2025
National sevens team
Years	Team		Comps
2023	South Africa Sevens		1
- Correct as of 20 December 2025

Gurshwin Wehr (born 9 September 1998) is a South African rugby union player, who plays for the Sale Sharks and Griquas. His preferred position is wing.

== Early career ==
Wehr was born in Worcester and attended Worcester Gymnasium. He played his club rugby for Young Hamiltons and Worcester Villagers.

== Professional career ==
Wehr first signed professionally with the Griffons and represented the side between 2020 and 2024. After some strong performances for the Griffons, he was called up by the Sharks for the opening match of the 2024–25 United Rugby Championship against Connacht. He then signed for the Griquas ahead of the 2025 Currie Cup Premier Division, helping the side win the Currie Cup, and winning two awards at the end of the season. In December 2025, he signed a short-term deal with the Sale Sharks.

Wehr has also represented South Africa at Sevens, taking part in the 2023 Vancouver Sevens.
