= SJ Kotze =

South African rugby union player

- Born: 2 January 2003 (age 23) South Africa
- Height: 186 cm (6 ft 1 in)
- Weight: 110 kg (243 lb; 17 st 5 lb)
- School: Paarl Boys' High School

Rugby union career
- Position: Prop
- Current team: Lions / Golden Lions
Senior career
Years	Team	Apps	(Points)
2024–	Golden Lions	16	(10)
2024–	Lions	39	(15)
- Correct as of 3 November 2026
International career
Years	Team	Apps	(Points)
2023	South Africa U20	4	(0)
- Correct as of 5 May 2025

SJ Kotze (born 2 January 2003) is a South African rugby union player, who plays for the Lions and Golden Lions. His preferred position is prop.

== Early career ==
Kotze attended Paarl Boys' High School where he earned selection for the 2023 SA Rugby Academy. He came through the Lions academy representing the Lions U20 side. He was named in the South Africa U20 side in 2023.

== Professional career ==
Kotze made his professional debut for the Golden Lions in the 2024 Currie Cup Premier Division making 6 appearances across the tournament. He made his debut for the Lions in December 2024, and has gone on to make 11 appearances for the side.
