= Jarod Cairns =

South African rugby union player

- Born: 18 May 2001 (age 25) South Africa
- Height: 187 cm (6 ft 2 in)
- Weight: 101 kg (223 lb; 15 st 13 lb)
- School: Paul Roos Gymnasium

Rugby union career
- Position: Lock / Flanker
- Current team: Lions / Golden Lions
Senior career
Years	Team	Apps	(Points)
2022–	Lions	33	(15)
2022–	Golden Lions	45	(70)
- Correct as of 26 October 2026

Jarod Cairns (born 18 May 2001) is a South African rugby union player, who plays for the Lions and Golden Lions. His preferred position is lock or Flanker.

== Early career ==
Cairns was born in Helderberg and attended Paul Roos Gymnasium where he captained the rugby side. His performances for the school earned his selection for Western Province age group sides and captained the South Africa Schools A side.

== Professional career ==
Cairns made his professional debut for the Lions in May 2022. He was also named in the Golden Lions squad for the 2022 Currie Cup Premier Division and has continued to represent them since. He has gone on to make 20 appearances for the Lions.
