= Prince Nkabinde =

South African rugby union player

- Full name: Prince Nkabinde
- Born: South Africa
- Height: 1.80 m (5 ft 11 in)
- Weight: 106 kg (16 st 10 lb; 234 lb)

Rugby union career
- Position: Wing
- Current team: Golden Lions
Senior career
| Years | Team | Apps | (Points) |
| 2019 | Golden Lions XV | 3 | (10) |
| 2022 | Griquas | 1 | (0) |
| 2023– | Golden Lions | 3 | (0) |
- Correct as of 8 May 2023

Prince Nkabinde is a South African rugby union player for the Cheetahs in the Currie Cup. His regular position is wing.

Nkabinde was named in the Griquas side for the 2022 Currie Cup Premier Division. He made his Currie Cup debut for the Griquas against the Golden Lions in Round 6 of the 2022 Currie Cup Premier Division.
