= Renzo du Plessis =

South African rugby union player

- Born: 12 July 2002 (age 24) Tzaneen, South Africa
- Height: 188 cm (6 ft 2 in)
- Weight: 108 kg (238 lb; 17 st 0 lb)
- School: Hoërskool Ben Vorster

Rugby union career
- Position: Flanker
- Current team: Lions / Golden Lions
Senior career
Years	Team	Apps	(Points)
2023–	Golden Lions	33	(70)
2024–	Lions	26	(15)
- Correct as of 26 October 2026

Renzo du Plessis (born 12 July 2002) is a South African rugby union player, who plays for the Lions and Golden Lions. His preferred position is Flanker.

== Early career ==
Du Plessis is from Tzaneen and attended Hoërskool Ben Vorster where he was head boy. He represented the SA Schools A side in 2019, having come through the youth sides of the Limpopo Blue Bulls and the Sharks, representing the Sharks U20 side.

== Professional career ==
Du Plessis moved to Johannesburg and made his professional debut for the Golden Lions in the 2023 Currie Cup Premier Division, who he has continued to represent since, winning Currie Cup Player of the Year for 2024. He made his Lions debut in September 2024, and has continued to represent the side since.
