= Juan Mostert =

South African rugby union player

- Full name: Juan Mostert
- Born: 11 January 2000 (age 26) South Africa
- Height: 1.93 m (6 ft 4 in)
- Weight: 92 kg (14 st 7 lb; 203 lb)

Rugby union career
- Position: Fly-half
- Current team: Bulls / Blue Bulls
Senior career
Years	Team	Apps	(Points)
2022–2024	Blue Bulls	9	(24)
2022–2023	Bulls	3	(0)
2024–2025	Rovigo Delta	4	(2)
- Correct as of 23 July 2022

Juan Mostert (born 11 January 2000) is a South African rugby union player for the Bulls in the United Rugby Championship and Blue Bulls in the Currie Cup. His regular position is fly-half.

Mostert was named in the Blue Bulls side for the 2022 Currie Cup Premier Division. He made his debut for the Bulls in the re-arranged Round 10 of the 2021–22 United Rugby Championship against Zebre Parma. Previously, Mostert had agreed to sign for Major League Rugby side Seattle Seawolves, but decided against the move to join the Bulls instead. In 2024–25 season he played for Rovigo Delta in Italian Serie A Elite.
