= Lubabalo Dobela =

South African rugby union player

- Born: 2 May 1998 (age 28) East London
- Height: 1.75 m (5 ft 9 in)
- Weight: 80 kg (12 st 8 lb; 176 lb)
- School: Grey High School
- University: University of the Free State

Rugby union career
- Position: Flyhalf
- Current team: Lions
Senior career
Years	Team	Apps	(Points)
2018 - 2020	Free State Cheetahs		
2023-2025	Griquas	22	(121)
2025–	Golden Lions	7	(34)
2025–	Lions	6	(25)
International career
Years	Team	Apps	(Points)
2018	South Africa Under-20		
National sevens team
Years	Team		Comps
2022	South Africa Sevens		
- Correct as of 31 January 2026

Lubabalo Dobela (born 2 May 1998) is a South African rugby union player who plays as a flyhalf for the Golden Lions in the Currie Cup and the Lions in the United Rugby Championship. His father is David Dobela who is a former assistant coach at the Stormers and former head coach for the Border Bulldogs

== Early career ==
After Dobela matriculated from Grey High School in Gqeberha he joined the Free State Cheetahs. From there he was selected to represent the South Africa under-20 team in 2018. While with the Cheetahs, he played for the Shimlas in the Varsity Cup.

== Sevens career ==
In 2020 he joined the South Africa Sevens academy. He made his debut for the national team in 2022 at the Singapore Sevens tournament.

== Club career ==
=== Griquas ===
After losing interest in sevens he was signed by the Griquas in 2023. He made his debut in the Currie Cup in a 19-42 loss against the Cheetahs. He finished his debut season with 83 points and 3 tries from 14 appearances. In his second season for the Griquas he made 8 appearances and scored 38 points with one try.

=== Lions ===
Dobela was signed by the Lions before the start of the 2024–25 United Rugby Championship season, however did not make his URC debut until the end of the season due to competition from already established fly-halves. He eventually made his debut in round 16 of the competition, coming off the bench in a 26-7 win against Connacht. He made his first start for the Lions in the final round of the regular season against the Ospreys, where he scored a last minute try and converted it to win 29-28.
