= Andre Fouché =

South African rugby union player

- Full name: Andre Fouché
- Born: South Africa
- Height

Rugby union career
- Position: Flanker
- Current team: Pumas
Senior career
Years	Team	Apps	(Points)
2019–2021	Leopards	9	(30)
2022–	Pumas	5	(0)
- Correct as of 10 July 2022

Andre Fouché is a South African rugby union player for the Pumas in the Currie Cup. His regular position is flanker.

Fouché was named in the Pumas side for the 2022 Currie Cup Premier Division. He made his Currie Cup debut for the Pumas against the Blue Bulls in Round 12 of the 2022 Currie Cup Premier Division.
