= Rewan Kruger =

South African rugby union player

- Full name: Rewan Kruger
- Born: 20 March 1998 (age 28) South Africa
- Height: 1.79 m (5 ft 10 1/2 in)
- Weight: 78 kg (12 st 4 lb; 172 lb)

Rugby union career
- Position: Scrum-half
- Current team: Cheetahs / Free State Cheetahs
Senior career
Years	Team	Apps	(Points)
2020	Cheetahs	0	(0)
2020–2021	Free State Cheetahs	0	(0)
2022–	Cheetahs		
2022–	Free State Cheetahs	11	(0)
- Correct as of 10 July 2022
International career
Years	Team	Apps	(Points)
2017–2018	South Africa U20	4	(0)
- Correct as of 16 January 2022

Rewan Kruger (born 20 March 1998) is a South African rugby union player for the Free State Cheetahs in the Currie Cup. His regular position is scrum-half.

Kruger was named in the Free State Cheetahs side for the 2022 Currie Cup Premier Division. He made his Currie Cup debut for the Free State Cheetahs against the Griquas in Round 1 of the 2022 Currie Cup Premier Division.
