= Pieter Bergh =

South Africa professional rugby union football coach

- Born: South Africa
- University: University of South Africa

Rugby union career
- Position: Head coach
- Current team: Griquas
Coaching career
- Years: Team
- 2006–2011: Boland Cavaliers (Performance Analyst)
- 2011: Boland Cavaliers (Assistant coach)
- 2012–2015: Griquas (Defence coach)
- 2014–2018: Griquas (Assistant coach)
- 2019–2021: Central University of Technology
- 2021–: Griquas

Pieter Bergh is a South African professional rugby union football coach. He is currently the head coach of the Griquas side that participates in the Currie Cup. He was previously head coach of the Central University of Technology (CUT) side that participated in the Varsity Cup, and also assistant coach at the Griquas between 2014 and 2018. In 2022 he coached the first Griquas team to play in a Currie Cup final in 52 years (last 1970). In 2025 Griquas won the Currie Cup beating the Lions at Ellis Park in the final by 27-25 to lift the trophy for the first time in 55 years.
