= RF Schoeman =

South African rugby union player

- Born: 13 August 2003 (age 23) South Africa
- Height: 188 cm (6 ft 2 in)
- Weight: 122 kg (269 lb; 19 st 3 lb)
- School: Hoërskool Frikkie Meyer

Rugby union career
- Position: Prop
- Current team: Lions / Golden Lions
Senior career
Years	Team	Apps	(Points)
2024–	Golden Lions	18	(5)
2024–	Lions	42	(0)
- Correct as of 3 November 2026

RF Schoeman (born 13 August 2003) is a South African rugby union player, who plays for the Lions and Golden Lions. His preferred position is prop.

== Early career ==
Schoeman attended Hoërskool Frikkie Meyer where he played rugby. He came through the Lions academy system and represented the Lions U20 side in 2024, winning the Lions junior player of the year award along with breakthrough player of the year.

== Professional career ==
Schoeman made his professional debut for the Golden Lions in the 2024 Currie Cup Premier Division making 6 appearances across the tournament. He made his debut for the Lions in October 2024, and has gone on to make 14 appearances for the side.
