= Christopher Allison (referee) =

South African rugby union referee

- Occupation(s): Rugby union referee; attorney

Rugby union career
Refereeing career
Years	Competition	Apps
2024–present	United Rugby Championship	10
2023–present	Currie Cup Premier Division	
2026–present	EPCR Challenge Cup	

Christopher Allison is a South African professional rugby union referee and member of the South African Rugby Union's Elite Referee Group. He has been involved in the United Rugby Championship as a match official since 2023, receiving more than 30 appointments as an assistant referee before and alongside refereeing 10 league matches between his refereeing debut in September 2024 and the end of the 2025–26 season. He has also officiated in the Currie Cup Premier Division, the EPCR Challenge Cup and international age-grade rugby. Allison was appointed to SA Rugby's newly established Elite Referee Panel for 2025 and retained his place in the Elite Group for 2026.

== Refereeing career ==
=== 2013–2017: Early refereeing ===
Allison began refereeing in 2013, initially progressing through the Blue Bulls refereeing structures before advancing into SA Rugby's national pathway.

=== 2018–2022: National pathway ===
Allison appeared on the South African Rugby Union's National B and Sevens referee panels for the 2018 season. He was elevated to the National and Sevens panels for 2019 and remained on SA Rugby's National Panel in 2022. During this period, he officiated in SA Rugby under-19 and under-21 competitions and received a number of semi-final and final appointments.

=== 2023 ===
In 2023, Allison progressed into senior domestic and cross-border professional rugby. He refereed in the Currie Cup Premier Division and took charge of the 2023 Varsity Cup final, in which the NWU Eagles defeated the UCT Ikey Tigers 27–25 in Potchefstroom.

His involvement in the United Rugby Championship also developed during 2023 through regular assistant-referee appointments. From 2023 onward, Allison accumulated more than 30 URC appointments as an assistant referee, working on matches involving both South African and European clubs.

=== 2024 ===
Allison refereed the inaugural 2024 SA Cup final in Kimberley, where Griquas defeated the Pumas 46–24. In September, he took charge of the Currie Cup Premier Division semi-final between the Lions and the Cheetahs at Ellis Park.

On 28 September 2024, Allison made his URC refereeing debut, taking charge of Scarlets against Cardiff Rugby at Parc y Scarlets. In November, SA Rugby named him as one of six officials on its new Elite Referee Panel, overseen by former international referee Jaco Peyper and intended to prepare South African match officials for international rugby.

=== 2025 ===
Allison continued to referee in the URC during 2025, including South African derbies and matches in Europe, while continuing to receive assistant-referee appointments. In September, he was appointed to referee the Currie Cup Premier Division final between the Lions and Griquas at Ellis Park. He retained his place in SA Rugby's Elite Group for the 2026 season.

=== 2026 ===
Allison made his refereeing debut in the EPCR Challenge Cup on 16 January 2026, taking charge of Dragons RFC against Newcastle Red Bulls at Rodney Parade. In February, he refereed France against Ireland in the Six Nations Under 20s Championship.

His URC schedule continued with fixtures in South Africa and Europe. Edinburgh against Zebre Parma in April was his ninth league match as referee, followed by his tenth when he refereed the Welsh derby between Cardiff and Ospreys at Cardiff Arms Park on 24 April. He also served as a television match official in the competition.

In May, Allison refereed his second SA Cup final, again contested by Griquas and the Pumas in Kimberley. Later that month, World Rugby selected him as one of twelve referees for the 2026 World Rugby Junior World Championship in Georgia. His appointments included France against Spain, Argentina against England and the thirteenth-place semi-final between Japan and the United States, followed by assistant-referee appointments in the placing matches, including the third-place play-off between New Zealand and England.

== Education and legal career ==
Allison attended Affies (Afrikaanse Hoër Seunskool) in Pretoria and later graduated in law from the University of Pretoria. He practises as an attorney in South Africa.
