= Eddie Davids =

South African rugby union player

- Full name: Edward Davids
- Born: 2 April 1998 (age 28) Bloemfontein, South Africa
- Height: 1.78 m (5 ft 10 in)
- Weight: 115 kg (254 lb)
- School: Hoërskool Fichardtpark
- University: Central University of Technology

Rugby union career
- Position: Prop
- Current team: Griquas
Senior career
Years	Team	Apps	(Points)
2022–	Griquas	50	(0)
2025–	Lions	16	(0)
- Correct as of 26 October 2026

Eddie Davids is a South African rugby union player for the Griquas in the Currie Cup. His regular position is prop.

In 2016, Davids matriculated from Hoërskool Fichardtpark in Bloemfontein. Davids was named in the Griquas side for the 2022 Currie Cup Premier Division. He made his Currie Cup debut for the Griquas against the Free State Cheetahs in Round 1 of the 2022 Currie Cup Premier Division.
