= Mnombo Zwelendaba =

South African rugby union player

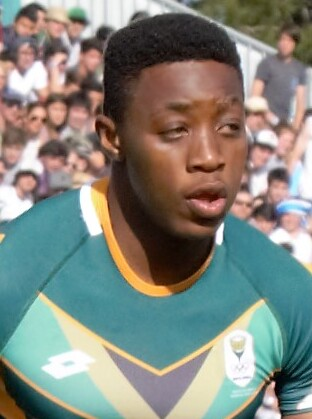
- Full name: Mnombo Zwelendaba
- Born: 21 February 2000 (age 26) South Africa
- Height: 1.84 m (6 ft 1/2 in)
- Weight: 93 kg (14 st 9 lb; 205 lb)
- School: Selborne College

Rugby union career
- Position: Centre
- Current team: Griquas
Senior career
Years	Team	Apps	(Points)
2021–2024	Stormers	0	(0)
2021–2024	Western Province	11	(0)
2024-present	Griquas	0	(0)
- Correct as of 23 July 2022

Mnombo Zwelendaba (born 21 February 2000) is a South African professional rugby union player for the Griquas in the Currie Cup. His regular position is centre.

Zwelendaba was named in the Western Province side for the 2022 Currie Cup Premier Division. He made his Currie Cup debut for the Western Province against the Golden Lions in Round 1 of the 2022 Currie Cup Premier Division.
