= Darnell Osuagwu =

South African rugby union player

- Full name: Darnell Osuagwu
- Born: 29 December 1999 (age 26) South Africa
- Height: 1.77 m (5 ft 9 1/2 in)
- Weight: 110 kg (17 st 5 lb; 243 lb)
- University: UJ

Rugby union career
- Position: Hooker
- Current team: Pumas
Senior career
Years	Team	Apps	(Points)
2022	Golden Lions	1	(5)
2022	Falcons	1	(0)
2023–	Pumas	1	(0)
- Correct as of 9 June 2023

Darnell Osuagwu (born 29 December 1999) is a South African rugby union player for the Golden Lions in the Currie Cup. His regular position is hooker.

== Achievements ==
Osuagwu was named in the Golden Lions side for the 2022 Currie Cup Premier Division. He made his Currie Cup debut for the Golden Lions against the Western Province in Round 1 of the 2022 Currie Cup Premier Division.
