= Khwezi Mafu =

South African rugby union player

- Born: 29 March 1998 (age 28) South Africa
- Height: 1.90 m (6 ft 3 in)
- Weight: 106 kg (16 st 10 lb; 234 lb)
- School: Grey High School Southdowns College
- University: University of Pretoria

Rugby union career
- Position: Lock / Flanker
- Current team: Pumas / Falcons
Youth career
- 2017-2019: Blue Bulls
Senior career
Years	Team	Apps	(Points)
2021–	Pumas	7	(0)
2022–	→ Falcons	4	(0)
- Correct as of 10 July 2022

Khwezi Mafu (born 29 March 1998) is a South African rugby union player for the Sanlam Boland Kavaliers in the Currie Cup. His regular position is Lock or Flanker.

Mafu was named in the Pumas side for the 2021 Currie Cup Premier Division. He made his Currie Cup debut for the Pumas against the Griquas in Round 3 of the 2021 Currie Cup Premier Division.

Mafu was accused of violently raping an 18-year-old woman in Port Elizabeth in 2018. These allegations were later withdrawn due to lack of key witness statements, and he was acquitted.
