= Lundi Msenge =

South African rugby union player

- Full name: Lundi Msenge
- Born: 21 January 1999 (age 27) South Africa
- Height: 1.79 m (5 ft 10 1/2 in)
- Weight: 81 kg (12 st 11 lb; 179 lb)

Rugby union career
- Position: Wing
- Current team: Pumas
Senior career
Years	Team	Apps	(Points)
2022–	Pumas	2	(0)
- Correct as of 10 July 2022

Lundi Msenge (born 21 January 1999) is a South African rugby union player for the Pumas in the Currie Cup. His regular position is wing.

Msenge was named in the Pumas squad for the 2022 Currie Cup Premier Division. He made his Currie Cup debut in Round 1 of the competition against the Blue Bulls.
