= Griqua Park =

Multi-purpose stadium in Kimberley, South Africa

- Interactive map of Griqua Park
- Location: Kimberley, South Africa
- Coordinates: 28.7549444°S 24.7580083°E
- Capacity: 11,000
- Surface: Grass

Tenant
- Griquas (1991-present)

Griqua Park (currently known as Suzuki Stadium for sponsorship reasons) is an 11,000-capacity multi-purpose stadium in Kimberley, South Africa. It is mainly used for rugby union matches and it is the home stadium of provincial Currie Cup side Griquas. The Cheetahs Super Rugby side also played some matches at this ground.

Griquas relocated to the stadium from their former De Beers Stadium home in 1991, when the stadium was known as Hoffe Park. It was named after Chas Hoffe, the head manager of Spoornet who owned the ground. Despite initially having only two stands, much ground development was done during the mid-1990s under the leadership of then-president Andre Markgraaff, increasing the stadium's capacity to 11,000, as well as adding several suites.

Between 1998 and 2008, the stadium had a sponsorship deal with ABSA Bank, during which time the stadium was known as Absa Park. Between 2009 and 2015, the stadium was known as GWK Park thanks to a sponsorship deal from Douglas-based agricultural company GWK (Griekwaland-Wes Korporatief), who also became the title sponsor of the Griquas rugby team. When the sponsorship deal with GWK expired, the stadium became known as Griqua Park. During the course of the 2010 FIFA world cup, the stadium played host the Uruguay national football team as they chose Kimberley as their host city. The team used the stadium as their training ground while in the city.
