= 2021 Currie Cup Premier Division =

Domestic rugby union competition

- Countries: South Africa
- Date: 18 June – 11 September
- Champions: Blue Bulls (25th title)
- Runners-up: Sharks
- Matches played: 45
- Attendance: 0 (average 0 per match)
- Tries scored: 301 (average 6.7 per match)
- Top point scorer: George Whitehead (Griquas, 165)
- Top try scorer: Evan Roos (Western Province) & Simon Westraadt (Pumas) (both 8)

The 2021 Currie Cup Premier Division was the 83rd edition of the top tier of the Currie Cup, the premier domestic rugby union competition in South Africa. It was sponsored by beer brand Carling Black Label and organised by the South African Rugby Union.

The tournament returned to its usual dates, following being played from November to January in 2020/21 due to the COVID-19 pandemic. The tournament also returned to its usual length of 14 rounds followed by finals, following a shortened 7 round competition in 2020/21.

The First Division of the Currie Cup also returned in 2021, having been postponed due to the COVID-19 pandemic in 2020.

== Teams ==
Team locations in the 2021 Currie Cup Premier Division

The seven competing teams were:

2021 Currie Cup Premier Division
Team	Sponsored name
Blue Bulls	Vodacom Blue Bulls
Free State Cheetahs	Toyota Free State Cheetahs
Golden Lions	Xerox Golden Lions (until 1 July); Sigma Golden Lions (from 1 July)
Griquas	Tafel Lager Griquas
Pumas	New Nation Pumas
Sharks	Cell C Sharks
Western Province	DHL Western Province

== Regular season ==
=== Standings ===
2021 Currie Cup Premier Division standings
Pos	Team	Pld	W	D	L	PF	PA	PD	TF	TA	TB	LB	Pts	Qualification (Note: Seven fixtures were cancelled where the match was declared a draw with both teams awarded four tournament points, bar the Free State Cheetahs match with the Blue Bulls, where only the Blue Bulls were awarded 4 tournament points, and the Pumas match with the Sharks, where only the Pumas were awarded 4 tournament points.)
1	Blue Bulls	12	7	3	2	334	260	+74	46	30	8	1	49	Semifinals
2	Sharks	12	5	4	3	288	223	+65	38	26	7	1	40	Semifinals
3	Griquas	12	5	2	5	343	324	+19	39	44	6	2	35	Semifinals
4	Western Province	12	6	1	5	386	380	+6	46	49	7	2	35	Semifinals
5	Pumas	12	4	4	4	274	256	+18	33	32	3	3	34	
6	Free State Cheetahs	12	3	3	6	297	336	−39	39	41	7	2	28	
7	Golden Lions	12	2	3	7	270	413	−143	37	56	5	1	24	

Source: springboks.rugby
Rules for classification: Tournament points in the standings were awarded to teams as follows:
- 4 points for a win.
- 2 points for a draw.
- 1 bonus point for a loss in a match by seven points or under.
- 1 bonus point for scoring four tries or more.
Teams were ranked in the standings firstly by tournament points then by: (a) points difference from all matches (points scored less points conceded); (b) tries difference from all matches (tries scored less tries conceded); (c) points difference from the matches between the tied teams; (d) points scored in all matches; (e) tries scored in all matches; and, if needed, (f) a coin toss.

=== Round-by-round ===
The table below shows the progression of all teams throughout the Currie Cup season. Each team's tournament points on the standings log is shown for each round, with the overall log position in brackets.

2021 Currie Cup team progression
Team	R1	R2	R3	R4	R5	R6	R7	R8	R9	R10	R11	R12	R13	R14	Semi	Final
Blue Bulls	1 (4th)	6 (3rd)	10 (3rd)	10 (5th)	14 (4th)	18 (3rd)	23 (2nd)	28 (1st)	29 (2nd)	34 (1st)	39 (1st)	44 (1st)	44 (1st)	49 (1st)	Won	Won
Free State Cheetahs	0 (5th)	0 (7th)	0 (7th)	4 (7th)	8 (7th)	13 (6th)	14 (6th)	14 (7th)	16 (7th)	19 (7th)	21 (7th)	26 (6th)	26 (6th)	28 (6th)	DNQ	DNQ
Golden Lions	0 (7th)	5 (6th)	5 (6th)	9 (6th)	13 (5th)	14 (5th)	14 (7th)	16 (6th)	21 (5th)	24 (5th)	24 (6th)	24 (7th)	24 (7th)	24 (7th)	DNQ	DNQ
Griquas	0 (6th)	5 (5th)	6 (5th)	10 (4th)	14 (3rd)	19 (2nd)	19 (3rd)	24 (3rd)	26 (3rd)	26 (3rd)	26 (4th)	28 (5th)	33 (3rd)	35 (3rd)	Lost	DNQ
Pumas	5 (1st)	6 (2nd)	10 (2nd)	11 (2nd)	15 (1st)	15 (4th)	15 (5th)	20 (4th)	20 (6th)	24 (4th)	27 (3rd)	28 (4th)	32 (4th)	34 (5th)	DNQ	DNQ
Sharks	5 (3rd)	5 (4th)	7 (4th)	11 (3rd)	15 (2nd)	19 (1st)	24 (1st)	25 (2nd)	30 (1st)	30 (2nd)	35 (2nd)	35 (2nd)	40 (2nd)	40 (2nd)	Won	Lost
Western Province	5 (2nd)	7 (1st)	11 (1st)	12 (1st)	12 (6th)	12 (7th)	17 (4th)	17 (5th)	22 (4th)	22 (6th)	25 (5th)	30 (3rd)	30 (5th)	35 (4th)	Lost	DNQ
Key:	Win	Draw	Loss	No match	Bye											

=== Matches ===
Listed below are all matches for the double round-robin, played for the 2021 Currie Cup Premier Division.

==== Round 1 ====
18 June 2021	Pumas	39–10	Golden Lions	Mbombela Stadium, Mbombela
19:00	Try: Taljaard 33' c Westraadt 39' m Engelbrecht 47' c D. Maritz 60' c Smuts 68' c Con: Fouché (4/5) 34', 48', 61', 69'; Pen: Fouché (2/2) 27', 31'	Report	Try: Sangweni 22' c Con: Zeilinga (1/1) 23'; Pen: Zeilinga (1/1) 32'	Attendance: Behind closed doors Referee: Cwengile Jadezweni

19 June 2021	Griquas	16–30	Sharks	Tafel Lager Park, Kimberley
13:30	Try: Keyter 53' m Kasende 74' m Pen: Whitehead (2/2) 2', 12'; Cards: Sirgel (yellow card) 65' to 75'	Report	Try: Buthelezi 20' c J. Ward 47' c Andrews 50' m Van Vuuren 78' m Con: Chamberlain (2/4) 21', 49'; Pen: Chamberlain (1/2) 43'; Drop: Chamberlain 6'; Cards: Gumede (yellow card) 61' to 72'	Attendance: Behind closed doors Referee: Rasta Rasivhenge

19 June 2021	Blue Bulls	24–48	Western Province	Loftus Versfeld, Pretoria
16:00	Try: Mahlo 3' c R. Kriel 37' m Donald 70' c Labuschagne 80' m Con: F. du Plessis (1/2) 3'; J. Burger (1/2) 70'; Cards: Matanzima (yellow card) 40' to 49'	Report	Try: Njezula 10' c Kotze (4) 15' c, 27' c, 40+2' c, 49' m Roos 52' m D. du Plessis 68' c Con: Van Reenen (4/5) 11', 16', 27', 40+3'; Swiel (1/2) 68'; Pen: Swiel (1/1) 60'; Cards: Petersen (yellow card) 74'	Attendance: Behind closed doors Referee: Marius van der Westhuizen

Bye/s: Free State Cheetahs

==== Round 2 ====
23 June 2021	Golden Lions	38–32	Western Province	Emirates Airline Park, Johannesburg
19:00	Try: Sangweni 6' m Maxwane (2) 13' m, 47' c Botha (2) 24' c, 43' c Schoeman 39' c Con: Zeilinga (4/6) 25', 40', 44', 48'; Cards: Visagie (yellow card) 67' to 77'; Schoeman (yellow card) 68' to 79'	Report	Try: Augustus 19' c Penalty try 70'; De Wet 71' c Smit 73' m Con: Swiel (2/3) 20', 71'; Pen: Swiel (2/2) 28', 76'; Cards: Roos (yellow card) 38' to 48'	Attendance: Behind closed doors Referee: AJ Jacobs

25 June 2021	Blue Bulls	32–27	Pumas	Loftus Versfeld, Pretoria
19:00	Try: Vorster 14' c Tambwe 34' c Hendricks 54' m D. Kriel 70' c Con: Smith (3/4) 14', 35', 71'; Pen: Smith (2/2) 28', 49'	Report	Try: Taljaard 44' c Fouché 57' c Mafura 63' c Con: Fouché (3/3) 45', 58', 64'; Pen: Fouché (2/4) 11', 74'	Attendance: Behind closed doors Referee: Rasta Rasivhenge

26 June 2021	Griquas	31–10	Free State Cheetahs	Tafel Lager Park, Kimberley
13:00	Try: Banda 37' c Nel 52' c Zito 65' c Keyter 72' c Con: Whitehead (4/4) 38', 53', 66', 73'; Pen: Whitehead (1/2) 71'; Cards: Sirgel (yellow card) 26' to 35'	Report	Try: G. van Wyk 45'; Con: Pienaar (1/1) 46'; Pen: Pienaar (1/1) 28'	Attendance: Behind closed doors Referee: AJ Jacobs

Bye/s: Sharks

==== Round 3 ====
30 June 2021	Free State Cheetahs	0–0 (Note: The match between the Free State Cheetahs and Blue Bulls was cancelled after players from the Free State Cheetahs returned positive tests for COVID-19 during the week before the game. The match was declared a draw, with the Blue Bulls awarded 4 points on the standings log.)	Blue Bulls	Toyota Stadium, Bloemfontein
16:45

30 June 2021	Western Province	32–31	Sharks	Cape Town Stadium, Cape Town
17:00	Try: De Wet 12' c Roos 41' c Con: Swiel (2/2) 13', 41'; Pen: Swiel (6/6) 5', 19', 23', 31', 45', 77'	Report	Try: Bholi 16' c Hendrikse (2) 27' c, 34' c Mbatha 50' c Con: Bosch (4/4) 17', 28', 35', 51'; Pen: Bosch (1/2) 75'	Attendance: Behind closed doors Referee: Rasta Rasivhenge

2 July 2021	Pumas	26–22	Griquas	Mbombela Stadium, Mbombela
16:00	Try: More 17' c Westraadt (2) 28' m, 52' m Con: Fouché (1/3) 18'; Pen: Fouché (3/3) 7', 41', 47'	Report	Try: Nel 39' c Con: Whitehead (1/1) 39'; Pen: Whitehead (5/5) 13', 34', 37', 58', 66'	Attendance: Behind closed doors Referee: Griffin Colby

Bye/s: Golden Lions

==== Round 4 ====
7 July 2021	Western Province	28–30	Griquas	Cape Town Stadium, Cape Town
15:45	Try: Kotze (2) 6' c, 17' m Petersen 39' c Con: Swiel (2/3) 7', 40'; Pen: Swiel (3/3) 36', 42', 66'; Cards: Mazibuko (yellow card) 32' to 42'	Report	Try: Davids 10' c Kasende 29' c Lindsay 80+1' c Con: Whitehead (3/3) 10', 30', 80+2'; Pen: Whitehead (3/4) 22', 46', 70'	Attendance: Behind closed doors Referee: Aimee Barrett-Theron

9 July 2021	Free State Cheetahs	17–16	Pumas	Toyota Stadium, Bloemfontein
16:00	Try: Pienaar 55' c Botha 61' c Con: Pienaar (2/2) 57', 62'; Pen: Pienaar (1/3) 38'; Cards: Rudolph (yellow card) 10' to 21'; Van Vuuren (yellow card) 66' to 76'	Report	Try: Penalty try 66'; Pen: Fouché (3/4) 11', 41', 59'; Cards: Engelbrecht (yellow card) 44' to 55'	Attendance: Behind closed doors Referee: Cwengile Jadezweni

10 July 2021	Sharks	0–0 (Note: The match between the Sharks and Golden Lions was cancelled due to the British & Irish Lions scheduling a match against the Sharks on the same day. Both sides are awarded 4 log points.)	Golden Lions	Jonsson Kings Park, Durban
14:30

Bye/s: Blue Bulls

==== Round 5 ====
16 July 2021	Sharks	0–0 (Note: The match between the Sharks and Pumas was cancelled due to civil unrest in South Africa. Both sides are awarded 4 log points.)	Pumas	Jonsson Kings Park, Durban

17 July 2021	Griquas	0–0 (Note: The match between the Griquas and Blue Bulls was cancelled due to civil unrest in South Africa. Both sides are awarded 4 log points.)	Blue Bulls	Tafel Lager Park, Kimberley
12:15

17 July 2021	Golden Lions	0–0 (Note: The match between the Golden Lions and Free State Cheetahs was cancelled due to civil unrest in South Africa. Both sides are awarded 4 log points.)	Free State Cheetahs	Emirates Airline Park, Johannesburg
14:30

Bye/s: Western Province

==== Round 6 ====
21 July 2021	Golden Lions	31–41	Griquas	Emirates Airline Park, Johannesburg
14:30	Try: Van den Berg 27' m Sithole 33' c Maxwane 45' c Dreyer 63' c Gordon 78' m Con: Hendrikse (3/4) 34', 46', 64'; Cards: Viljoen (red card) 53'; Matthews (yellow card) 72'	Report	Try: Van der Merwe 1' c Keyter (4) 35' c, 54' c, 65' c, 69' c Con: Whitehead (5/5) 1', 37', 55', 67', 70'; Pen: Whitehead (2/4) 20', 50'	Attendance: Behind closed doors Referee: Rasta Rasivhenge

21 July 2021	Free State Cheetahs	38–21	Western Province	Toyota Stadium, Bloemfontein
16:45	Try: Saal 1' m Brits 46' c Pienaar 49' c Jasper 77' c Con: Pienaar (2/3) 46', 49'; Fortuin (1/1) 78'; Pen: Pienaar (4/4) 37', 40+1', 55', 74'	Report	Try: Roos (2) 44' c, 52' c Bursey 80+1' c Con: Swiel (2/2) 45', 53'; Mngomezulu (1/1) 80+2'	Attendance: Behind closed doors Referee: Morné Ferreira

21 July 2021	Sharks	0–0 (Note: The match between the Sharks and Blue Bulls was cancelled due to civil unrest in South Africa. Both sides are awarded 4 log points.)	Blue Bulls	Jonsson Kings Park, Durban
19:00

Bye/s: Pumas

==== Round 7 ====
24 July 2021	Free State Cheetahs	30–47	Sharks	Toyota Stadium, Bloemfontein
14:30	Try: Specman (2) 4' m, 62' c Thomson 48' c Saal 53' m Con: Pienaar (1/3) 49'; Fortuin (1/1) 63'; Pen: Thomson (1/1) 25'; Pienaar (1/2) 32'; Cards: Pienaar (yellow card) 16' to 26'	Report	Try: Kok 20' c Williams (2) 29' c, 56' c Volmink 39' c Van Vuuren 70' c Con: Bosch (5/5) 21', 30', 40', 57', 71'; Pen: Bosch (4/5) 34', 43', 65', 80'	Attendance: Behind closed doors Referee: Marius van der Westhuizen

25 July 2021	Pumas	23–37	Western Province	Mbombela Stadium, Mbombela
13:00	Try: Penalty try 35'; Westraadt 70' m Fouché 80+3' m Pen: Labuschagné (1/1) 18'; Marais (1/1) 45'; Cards: Jansen van Vuren (yellow card) 11' to 22'; Westraadt (yellow card) 57' to 68'	Report	Try: Leyds (2) 25' c, 61' c De Wet 52' c Roos 66' c Con: Swiel (4/4) 26', 52', 62', 67'; Pen: Swiel (3/3) 12', 23', 30'; Cards: Sandi (yellow card) 35' to 46'	Attendance: Behind closed doors Referee: Cwengile Jadezweni

25 July 2021	Blue Bulls	40–21	Golden Lions	Loftus Versfeld, Pretoria
15:15	Try: Vorster 2' c Z. Burger 5' c, 34' c Grobbelaar 21' c R. Kriel 54' m D. Kriel 60' c Con: Goosen (5/6) 3', 6', 21', 35', 62'; Cards: Botha (yellow card) 45' to 50'	Report	Try: V. Tshituka 8' c Skosan 30' c Sithole 72' c Con: Hendrikse (3/3) 9', 31', 72'	Attendance: Behind closed doors Referee: Paul Mente

Bye/s: Griquas

==== Round 8 ====
30 July 2021	Golden Lions	33–36	Pumas	Emirates Airline Park, Johannesburg
16:45	Try: Maxwane 11' c Penalty try 25'; Botha 31' c Skosan 64' c Sithole 69' m Con: Hendrikse (2/2) 12', 32'; Zeilinga (1/2) 65'; Cards: F. Pelser (yellow card) 49' to 59'	Report	Try: Williams 17' c Kirkwood 43' c Taljaard (2) 48' c, 57' c Cronjé 53' m Con: Fouché (4/5) 19', 44', 50', 58'; Pen: Fouché (1/3) 6'; Cards: Engelbrecht (yellow card) 9' to 19'; Jansen van Vuren (yellow card) 30' to 41'	Attendance: Behind closed doors Referee: Marius van der Westhuizen

30 July 2021	Western Province	13–34	Blue Bulls	DHL Newlands, Cape Town
19:00	Try: De Wet 1' c Con: Swiel (1/1) 1'; Pen: Swiel (2/3) 6', 26'; Cards: Ntubeni (red card) 35'	Report	Try: R. Kriel 3' c Grobbelaar 13' c Z. Burger 49' c Hendricks 74' c Con: Goosen (3/3) 4', 13', 49'; Smith (1/1) 75'; Pen: Goosen (2/2) 24', 68'	Attendance: Behind closed doors Referee: Cwengile Jadezweni

31 July 2021	Sharks	27–37	Griquas	Jonsson Kings Park, Durban
14:30	Try: Gumede 31' m Hugo 65' m Penxe 69' c Bholi 77' c Con: Bosch (2/4) 70', 77'; Pen: Bosch (1/1) 4'; Cards: Nohamba (yellow card) 34' to 45'	Report	Try: Kasende 1' c Uys 37' c Arendse 39' c Qoma 45' c Con: Whitehead (4/4) 2', 38', 40', 47'; Pen: Whitehead (3/3) 53', 68', 75'; Cards: Botha (yellow card) 19' to 30'; Ungerer (yellow card) 20' to 33'; Smith (yellow card) 60' to 70'; Qoma (yellow card) 62' to 72'; Luus (yellow card) 65' to 75'	Attendance: Behind closed doors Referee: Aimee Barrett-Theron

Bye/s: Free State Cheetahs

==== Round 9 ====
6 August 2021	Griquas	42–45	Golden Lions	Tafel Lager Park, Kimberley
14:30	Try: Brandt 13' c Mxoli 46' c Oranje 55' c Sirgel 66' c Arendse 74' c Keyter 79' c Con: Whitehead (6/6) 14', 47', 56', 67', 75', 79'	Report	Try: Warner 11' c Matthews (2) 22' c, 32' c Sadie 27' c Hendrikse 58' c Straeuli 71' c Con: Hendrikse (6/6) 12', 23', 28', 33', 59', 72'; Pen: Hendrikse (1/2) 51'; Cards: Dreyer (yellow card) 54' to 65'; Maxwane (yellow card) 75'	Attendance: Behind closed doors Referee: Griffin Colby

6 August 2021	Blue Bulls	28–35	Sharks	Jonsson Kings Park, Durban
19:00	Try: Louw 3' c Gqoboka 26' c Botha 78' m Con: Goosen (2/2) 4', 27'; Pen: Goosen (2/3) 14', 30'; Smith (1/1) 80+2'; Cards: Gans (yellow card) 46' to 57'	Report	Try: Roets 10' c Van Vuuren 49' c Williams 52' m Koster 55' c Con: Cronjé (3/4) 10', 50', 57'; Pen: Cronjé (3/3) 16', 32', 70'; Cards: Richardson (yellow card) 29' to 39'; Bholi (yellow card) 76'	Attendance: Behind closed doors Referee: Marius van der Westhuizen

7 August 2021	Western Province	40–39	Free State Cheetahs	DHL Newlands, Cape Town
14:30	Try: Petersen 4' c Roos 50' c Senatla 62' c Masimla 68' c Con: Swiel (4/4) 5', 51', 62', 69'; Pen: Swiel (4/4) 12', 23', 35', 73'; Cards: Xaba (yellow card) 27' to 39'	Report	Try: Rudolph (2) 6' c, 28' c Jasper 19' c Meyer 37' c Smit 65' m Con: Pienaar (4/5) 7', 21', 30', 38'; Pen: Pienaar (2/2) 42', 62'	Attendance: Behind closed doors Referee: Rasta Rasivhenge

Bye/s: Pumas

==== Round 10 ====
11 August 2021	Pumas	0–0 (Note: The match between the Pumas and Sharks was cancelled due to positive COVID-19 results within the Sharks team. The match was declared a draw with the Pumas awarded 4 log points.)	Sharks	Mbombela Stadium, Mbombela
14:30

11 August 2021	Blue Bulls	56–33	Griquas	Loftus Versfeld, Pretoria
16:45	Try: Goosen 16' c Erasmus (2) 25' m, 65' c Arendse (2) 26' m, 74' c W. Steenkamp 44' c Louw 58' c Wessels 71' m Con: Goosen (4/6) 17', 45, 59', 66'; Smith (1/2) 75'; Pen: Goosen (2/2) 13', 51'; Cards: Smith (yellow card) 9' to 20'; Arendse (yellow card) 53' to 64'	Report	Try: Ungerer 40' c Penalty try 53'; Uys 79' c Con: Whitehead (2/2) 40+1', 79'; Pen: Whitehead (4/4) 3', 6', 35', 42'	Attendance: Behind closed doors Referee: Rasta Rasivhenge

11 August 2021	Free State Cheetahs	44–44	Golden Lions	Toyota Stadium, Bloemfontein
19:00	Try: Pienaar 8' c Brits 12' m Barry 35' m Van der Westhuizen 52' c Jaer 59' c Ntsila 68' c Con: Pienaar (4/6) 10', 54', 60', 69'; Pen: Pienaar (2/2) 6', 26'	Report	Try: Straeuli 15' m Maxwane (2) 18' m, 65' c Visagie 21' c Pienaar 47' c Odendaal 56' c Con: Hendrikse (4/6) 22', 48', 58', 66'; Pen: Hendrikse (2/2) 45', 78'; Cards: Sangweni (yellow card) 30' to 40+1'	Attendance: Behind closed doors Referee: Marius van der Westhuizen

Bye/s: Western Province

==== Round 11 ====
14 August 2021	Golden Lions	21–48	Blue Bulls	Emirates Airline Park, Johannesburg
13:30	Try: Steenkamp 33' c McBeth 67' m Con: Hendrikse (1/2) 34'; Pen: Hendrikse (3/3) 7', 9', 17'	Report	Try: Swanepoel 21' c WJ Steenkamp 28' c Smith 45' m Steenekamp 50' c Goosen 60' c Tambwe 64' m Z. Burger 75' c Con: Smith (5/7) 22', 30', 51', 61', 76'; Pen: Smith (1/1) 4'; Cards: Wessels (yellow card) 17' to 27'	Attendance: Behind closed doors Referee: Marius van der Westhuizen

15 August 2021	Sharks	38–31	Free State Cheetahs	Jonsson Kings Park, Durban
13:30	Try: Abrahams (2) 11' m, 65' m Van Vuuren (2) 25' c, 59' c H. Venter 29' c Wright 43' c Con: Chamberlain (3/4) 26', 30', 43'; Cronjé (1/2) 60'; Cards: H. Venter (yellow card) 74'; E. van Heerden (yellow card) 75'	Report	Try: Boshoff 6' c Barry 38' m Dawson 62' m Ebersohn 78' m Con: Thomson (1/2) 7'; Pen: Thomson (3/4) 17', 22', 46'; Cards: J. Potgieter (red card) 42'	Attendance: Behind closed doors Referee: Stuart Berry

15 August 2021	Western Province	40–40	Pumas	DHL Newlands, Cape Town
16:00	Try: Van der Merwe 2' c Du Plessis 12' c Senatla (2) 15' m, 46' c Sandi 35' c Leyds 66' c Con: Swiel (5/6) 3', 13', 37', 47', 67'	Report	Try: Fouché 9' c Westraadt 31' c Maartens 39' m Kirkwood 53' c Cronjé 73' c Swart 77' c Con: Fouché (5/6) 10', 32', 54', 74', 78'	Attendance: Behind closed doors Referee: Griffin Colby

Bye/s: Griquas

==== Round 12 ====
18 August 2021	Pumas	26–33	Blue Bulls	Mbombela Stadium, Mbombela
14:30	Try: Otto 4' c De Klerk 44' c Con: Marais (1/1) 5'; Fouché (1/1) 45'; Pen: Marais (1/1) 9'; Fouché (3/3) 35', 40+1', 55'	Report	Try: Erasmus 19' c Jacobs 29' c Wessels 59' m Penalty try 65'; Smith 71' c Con: Goosen (3/4) 20', 30', 72'	Attendance: Behind closed doors Referee: Aimee Barrett-Theron

18 August 2021	Free State Cheetahs	33–32	Griquas	Toyota Stadium, Bloemfontein
16:45	Try: Brits 2' m Barry 9' c Van der Merwe 17' c Van Vuuren 64' c Pokomela 68' c Con: Pienaar (4/5) 10', 19', 65', 69'	Report	Try: Whitehead 15' c Hollis 20' m Verity-Amm 26' c Sirgel 37' c Con: Whitehead (3/4) 16', 27', 38'; Pen: Whitehead (2/3) 6', 63'	Attendance: Behind closed doors Referee: Griffin Colby

18 August 2021	Western Province	35–13	Golden Lions	DHL Newlands, Cape Town
19:00	Try: Masimla 18' c Roos (2) 41' c, 64' c A. Venter 79' m Con: Swiel (3/4) 19', 42', 65'; Pen: Swiel (3/3) 8', 27', 37'; Cards: Fouché (yellow card) 71'	Report	Try: Viljoen 22' c Con: Hendrikse (1/1) 23'; Pen: Hendrikse (2/2) 12', 32'	Attendance: Behind closed doors Referee: Rasta Rasivhenge

Bye/s: Sharks

==== Round 13 ====
21 August 2021	Pumas	28–19	Free State Cheetahs	Mbombela Stadium, Mbombela
11:45	Try: Westraadt (2) 4' m, 40' c Penalty try 68'; Con: Fouché (1/2) 40+1'; Pen: Fouché (3/3) 10', 24', 60'; Cards: Engelbrecht (yellow card) 74'	Report	Try: Sekekete 27' c Ntsila 64' c Blommetjies 74' m Con: Pienaar (2/3) 28', 65'; Cards: Coetzee (yellow card) 31' to 40'; Saal (yellow card) 67' to 77'; Ntsila (yellow card) 69' to 78'	Attendance: Behind closed doors Referee: Aimee Barrett-Theron

21 August 2021	Golden Lions	14–56	Sharks	Emirates Airline Park, Johannesburg
14:10	Try: E. Tshituka 58' c Visagie 68' c Con: Hendrikse (2/2) 59', 69'; Cards: Botha (yellow card) 23' to 33'; Pienaar (yellow card) 40+1' to 52'	Report	Try: Louw 18' c Abrahams (3) 22' c, 44' c, 71' c Buthelezi 32' c Volmink (2) 40+2' c, 79' c Nohamba 63' c Con: Cronjé (5/5) 19', 23', 33', 40+3', 44'; Chamberlain (3/3) 64', 72', 80'	Attendance: Behind closed doors Referee: Rasta Rasivhenge

22 August 2021	Griquas	46–25	Western Province	Tafel Lager Park, Kimberley
13:30	Try: Van der Merwe 18' c Sirgel 27' c Smith 40+1' c Steenkamp 41' c Verity-Amm (2) 50' m, 75' c Con: Whitehead (5/6) 19', 28', 40+2', 42', 77'; Pen: Whitehead (2/3) 6', 71'; Cards: Verity-Amm (yellow card) 23' to 34'	Report	Try: Petersen 25' c Nel 30' m Fouché 63' c Con: Swiel (2/3) 26', 65'; Pen: Swiel (2/2) 3', 37'; Cards: De Wet (yellow card) 27' to 38'	Attendance: Behind closed doors Referee: Stuart Berry

Bye/s: Blue Bulls

==== Round 14 ====
28 August 2021	Griquas	13–13	Pumas	Tafel Lager Park, Kimberley
14:30	Try: Hollis 71' c Con: Whitehead (1/1) 73'; Pen: Whitehead (2/3) 4', 50'; Cards: Smith (yellow card) 12' to 24'	Report	Try: Mafura 27' m De Klerk 52' m Pen: Fouché (1/2) 44'	Attendance: Behind closed doors Referee: Cwengile Jadezweni

28 August 2021	Blue Bulls	39–36	Free State Cheetahs	Loftus Versfeld, Pretoria
16:45	Try: Jansen van Vuren 3' c Louw 15' c Wessels (2) 37' c, 47' m Tambwe 61' c Con: Goosen (4/5) 4', 16', 38', 62'; Pen: Goosen (2/2) 26', 67'; Cards: Botha (yellow card) 22' to 33'; Combrinck (yellow card) 75'	Report	Try: Mosi 7' c Saal 11' c Penalty try 22'; Jasper 71' c Jaer 75' m Con: Pienaar (3/4) 9', 13', 72'; Pen: Pienaar (1/2) 40+1'; Cards: Sekekete (yellow card) 47' to 57'	Attendance: Behind closed doors Referee: AJ Jacobs

28 August 2021	Sharks	24–35	Western Province	Jonsson Kings Park, Durban
19:00	Try: Penxe (2) 20' c, 70' c Buthelezi 31' c Con: Bosch (3/3) 21', 31', 71'; Pen: Bosch (1/2) 12'	Report	Try: Du Plessis (2) 7' c, 13' c De Wet 45' c Kotze 73' c Van der Merwe 80+2' c Con: Swiel (5/5) 8', 15', 45', 75', 80+3'	Attendance: Behind closed doors Referee: Marius van der Westhuizen

Bye/s: Golden Lions

== Play-offs ==
=== Semifinals ===
3 September 2021	Bulls	48–31	Western Province	Loftus Versfeld, Pretoria
19:00	Try: Hendricks (2) 5' c, 67' c Goosen 7' c Botha 15' c Mapoe 28' c Coetzee 35' c Con: Goosen (6/6) 5', 7', 16', 30', 36', 68'; Pen: Goosen (2/2) 1', 53'	Report	Try: Van der Merwe (3) 11' m, 46' c, 79' c Dayimani 18' c A. Venter 70' m Con: Swiel (3/5) 20', 46', 79'	Attendance: Behind closed doors Referee: AJ Jacobs

4 September 2021	Sharks	28–24	Griquas	Jonsson Kings Park, Durban
17:00	Try: Van Vuuren (2) 30' c, 52' m Louw 36' c Con: Bosch (2/3) 31', 37'; Pen: Bosch (3/4) 3', 43', 72'; Cards: Louw (yellow card) 69' to 79'	Report	Try: Smith 48' m Momsen 78' c Con: Whitehead (1/2) 78'; Pen: Whitehead (4/5) 13', 19', 25', 41'	Attendance: Behind closed doors Referee: Marius van der Westhuizen

=== Final ===
The Blue Bulls became the first team in the 130-year history of the Currie Cup competition to lift the trophy twice in the same year having beaten the Sharks in the final of last season’s competition that was delayed by the COVID-19 pandemic to January 2021. The Blue Bulls led 19–3 at halftime and also went on to record the biggest margin of victory ever in a Currie Cup final, beating their 39–9 win over Western Province in 1980. The Blue Bulls managed 44 points in this final which is their highest ever points tally in a Currie Cup final beating their previous highest 42 in the 42–33 win against the Free State Cheetahs in 2004.

11 September 2021	Blue Bulls	44–10	Sharks	Loftus Versfeld, Pretoria
17:00	Try: Vorster 3' m Mapoe 22' c Coetzee 33' c Swanepoel 47' c Z. Burger 55' c Hendricks 78' m Con: Smith (4/6) 23', 35', 49', 56'; Pen: Smith (2/2) 41', 68'	Report; Summary	Try: Du Toit 65' c Con: Bosch (1/1) 66'; Pen: Bosch (1/1) 31'; Cards: Kok (yellow card) 78'	Attendance: Behind closed doors Referee: Marius van der Westhuizen

Blue Bulls	Sharks

Bulls:
FB	15	David Kriel
RW	14	Cornal Hendricks
OC	13	Lionel Mapoe
IC	12	Harold Vorster
LW	11	Madosh Tambwe
FH	10	Chris Smith
SH	9	Zak Burger	(substituted off) 71'
N8	8	Elrigh Louw
BF	7	Arno Botha	(substituted off) 71'
OF	6	Marcell Coetzee (c)
RL	5	Ruan Nortjé
LL	4	Janko Swanepoel	(substituted off) 63'
TP	3	Mornay Smith	(substituted off) 61'
HK	2	Joe van Zyl	(substituted off) 61'
LP	1	Gerhard Steenekamp	(substituted off) 61'
Substitutes:
HK	16	Jan-Hendrik Wessels	(substituted on) 61'
PR	17	Simphiwe Matanzima	(substituted on) 61'
PR	18	Jacques van Rooyen	(substituted on) 61'
BR	19	Jacques du Plessis	(substituted on) 63'
BR	20	WJ Steenkamp	(substituted on) 71'
SH	21	Keagan Johannes	(substituted on) 71'
OB	22	Ruan Combrinck
OB	23	Stravino Jacobs
Coach:
Jake White

Sharks:
FB	15	Curwin Bosch
RW	14	Yaw Penxe
OC	13	Werner Kok	(yellow card) 78'
IC	12	Jeremy Ward
LW	11	Thaakir Abrahams
FH	10	Lionel Cronjé		(substituted off) 67'
SH	9	Sanele Nohamba
N8	8	Phepsi Buthelezi (c)
BF	7	Henco Venter		(substituted off) 61'
OF	6	Dylan Richardson
RL	5	Gerbrandt Grobler		(substituted off) 57'
LL	4	Le Roux Roets
TP	3	Thomas du Toit		(substituted off) 66'
HK	2	Kerron van Vuuren		(substituted off) 67'
LP	1	Khwezi Mona		(substituted off) 57'
Substitutes:
HK	16	Dan Jooste		(substituted on) 67'
PR	17	Ntuthuko Mchunu		(substituted on) 57'
PR	18	Khutha Mchunu		(substituted on) 66'
BR	19	Thembelani Bholi		(substituted on) 61'
LK	20	Reniel Hugo		(substituted on) 57'
SH	21	Lucky Dlepu
CE	22	Murray Koster
OB	23	Anthony Volmink		(substituted on) 67'
Coach:
Sean Everitt

Assistant Referees:
AJ Jacobs
Aimee Barrett-Theron
Television match official:
Stuart Berry

== Players ==
=== Player statistics ===
Top 10 point scorers
No	Player	Team	Points
1	George Whitehead	Griquas	165
2	Tim Swiel	Western Province	150
3	Eddie Fouché	Pumas	107
4	Johan Goosen	Blue Bulls	99
5	Ruan Pienaar	Free State Cheetahs	97
6	Jordan Hendrikse	Golden Lions	73
7	Curwin Bosch	Sharks	67
8	Chris Smith	Blue Bulls	51
9	Evan Roos	Western Province	40
9	Simon Westraadt	Pumas	40

Top 5 try scorers
No	Player	Team	Tries
1	Evan Roos	Western Province	8
1	Simon Westraadt	Pumas	8
3	Eduan Keyter	Griquas	7
3	JJ Kotze	Western Province	7
3	Kerron van Vuuren	Sharks	7

=== Team rosters ===
The respective team squads for the 2021 Currie Cup Premier Division are:

Blue Bulls squad
Forwards
- Henco Beukes
- Jaco Bezuidenhout
- Arno Botha
- Nizaam Carr
- Llewelyn Classen
- Marcell Coetzee
- Louis Conradie
- Tiaan de Klerk
- Ruan Delport
- Mhleli Dlamini
- Dewald Donald
- Jacques du Plessis
- Schalk Erasmus
- Werner Fourie
- Lizo Gqoboka
- Johan Grobbelaar
- Robert Hunt
- Francois Klopper
- Jaco Labuschagne
- Elrigh Louw
- Eduan Lubbe
- Reinhardt Ludwig
- Simphiwe Matanzima
- Louis Meiring
- Ruan Nortjé
- Nolan Pienaar
- Theuns Reynolds
- Raynard Roets
- JJ Scheepers
- Mornay Smith
- Gerhard Steenekamp
- Walt Steenkamp
- WJ Steenkamp
- Janko Swanepoel
- Uzile Tele
- Sidney Tobias
- Muller Uys
- Jacques van Rooyen
- Griffith van Wyk
- Joe van Zyl
- Adolph Visser
- Jan-Hendrik Wessels
Backs
- Gio Aplon
- Kurt-Lee Arendse
- Niel Beukes
- Jandre Burger
- Zak Burger
- David Coetzer
- Ruan Combrinck
- FC du Plessis
- Tiaan Fourie
- Stedman Gans
- Johan Goosen
- Cornal Hendricks
- Stravino Jacobs
- Marco Jansen van Vuren
- Sebastian Jobb
- Keagan Johannes
- Dawid Kellerman
- David Kriel
- Richard Kriel
- Kefentse Mahlo
- Lionel Mapoe
- Kabelo Mokoena
- Johan Mulder
- Sibongile Novuka
- Chris Smith
- Madosh Tambwe
- Louritz van der Schyff
- Ivan van Zyl
- Harold Vorster
- Sango Xamlashe
Coach
- Jake White

Free State Cheetahs squad
Forwards
- Wilmar Arnoldi
- Rynier Bernardo
- Aranos Coetzee
- George Cronjé
- Aidon Davis
- Cameron Dawson
- Jean Droste
- Schalk Ferreira
- Chris Massyn
- Oupa Mohojé
- Mihlali Mosi
- Andisa Ntsila
- Junior Pokomela
- Jacques Potgieter
- Lohan Potgieter
- Derik Pretorius
- Jeandré Rudolph
- Victor Sekekete
- Alulutho Tshakweni
- Marnus van der Merwe
- Louis van der Westhuizen
- Conraad van Vuuren
- Gideon van Wyk
- Hencus van Wyk
- Janus Venter
- Reinier Viljoen
Backs
- Dian Badenhorst
- Craig Barry
- Clayton Blommetjies
- Zenedine Booysen
- Evardi Boshoff
- Lesley Botha
- David Brits
- Branden de Kock
- Robert Ebersohn
- Reinhardt Fortuin
- Malcolm Jaer
- Cohen Jasper
- Siya Masuku
- Tian Meyer
- Howard Mnisi
- Marcell Muller
- Ruan Pienaar
- Duncan Saal
- Chris Smit
- Rosko Specman
- François Steyn
- Brandon Thomson
Coach
- Hawies Fourie

Golden Lions squad
Forwards
- Herman Agenbag
- Willem Alberts
- Kabous Bezuidenhout
- PJ Botha
- Justin Brandon
- Morné Brandon
- Ebot Buma
- Jarod Cairns
- Ruan Dreyer
- Jannie du Plessis
- Izan Esterhuizen
- Chergin Fillies
- Keagan Glade
- Travis Gordon
- Francke Horn
- Jaco Kriel
- Len Massyn
- Nathan McBeth
- Banele Mthenjane
- Oupa Mthiyane
- Lunga Ncube
- Lindo Ncusane
- Reinhard Nothnagel
- Asenathi Ntlabakanye
- FP Pelser
- MJ Pelser
- Carlü Sadie
- Sibusiso Sangweni
- Ruben Schoeman
- Sibusiso Shongwe
- Sti Sithole
- Roelof Smit
- Mark Snyman
- PJ Steenkamp
- Ruhan Straeuli
- Emmanuel Tshituka
- Vincent Tshituka
- Wilhelm van der Sluys
- Dameon Venter
- Jaco Visagie
- Edward Ronald White
Backs
- Ross Cronjé
- Aidynn Cupido
- Boldwin Hansen
- Jordan Hendrikse
- Elton Jantjies
- Dan Kriel
- Gianni Lombard
- Duncan Matthews
- Rabz Maxwane
- James Mollentze
- Burger Odendaal
- Stean Pienaar
- Mannie Rass
- Divan Rossouw
- Luke Rossouw
- Ngia Selengbe
- Wandisile Simelane
- Courtnall Skosan
- Dillon Smit
- Tiaan Swanepoel
- Boitumelo Tsatsane
- Jamba Ulengo
- Morné van den Berg
- Henco van Wyk
- EW Viljoen
- André Warner
- Kurt Webster
- Fred Zeilinga
Coach
- Ivan van Rooyen

Griquas squad
Forwards
- Andrew Beerwinkel
- Henco Beukes
- Janu Botha
- Luyolo Dapula
- Erich de Jager
- Carl Els
- Andrew Kuhn
- Jeandré Leonard
- Cameron Lindsay
- HJ Luus
- Madot Mabokela
- Johan Momsen
- Nqoba Mxoli
- Sibabalo Qoma
- Andries Schutte
- Hanru Sirgel
- Adré Smith
- Ruan Steenkamp
- Janco Uys
- Gideon van der Merwe
- Tiaan van der Merwe
- Ewald van der Westhuizen
- Alandré van Rooyen
- Tijde Visser
- Stefan Willemse
- Mzwanele Zito
Backs
- Ederies Arendse
- Masixole Banda
- Theo Boshoff
- Enver Brandt
- Ashlon Davids
- Tinus de Beer
- Zander du Plessis
- Johnathan Francke
- Michal Haznar
- Christopher Hollis
- Daniel Kasende
- Eduan Keyter
- Harlon Klaasen
- Jay-Cee Nel
- Raegan Oranje
- André Swarts
- Stefan Ungerer
- James Verity-Amm
- George Whitehead
Coach
- Scott Mathie

Pumas squad
Forwards
- Christo Bezuidenhout
- Llewelyn Classen
- Marné Coetzee
- Kwanda Dimaza
- Willie Engelbrecht
- Corné Fourie
- Etienne Janeke
- Pieter Jansen van Vuren
- Shane Kirkwood
- Francois Kleinhans
- Ruan Kramer
- Darrien Landsberg
- AJ le Roux
- Daniel Maartens
- Khwezi Mafu
- Phumzile Maqondwana
- Dewald Maritz
- Morgan Naudé
- Niel Otto
- Ewart Potgieter
- Ig Prinsloo
- Eduan Swart
- Brandon Valentyn
- HP van Schoor
- Simon Westraadt
- Jaco Willemse
Backs
- Tiaan Botes
- Erich Cronjé
- Sebastian de Klerk
- Eddie Fouché
- Ruwellyn Isbell
- Japie Kleinhans
- Gerrie Labuschagné
- Tapiwa Mafura
- Niel Marais
- Neil Maritz
- Ali Mgijima
- Matt More
- Luther Obi
- Chriswill September
- Ginter Smuts
- Giovan Snyman
- Jade Stighling
- Etienne Taljaard
- Wayne van der Bank
- Alwayno Visagie
- Devon Williams
Coach
- Jimmy Stonehouse

Sharks squad
Forwards
- Lourens Adriaanse
- Hyron Andrews
- Thembelani Bholi
- Phepsi Buthelezi
- Thomas du Toit
- Gerbrandt Grobler
- Mpilo Gumede
- Wiehahn Herbst
- Reniel Hugo
- Hanro Jacobs
- Dan Jooste
- Siya Kolisi
- Michael Kumbirai
- Jeandre Labuschagne
- Mzamo Majola
- Fez Mbatha
- Khutha Mchunu
- Ntuthuko Mchunu
- Khwezi Mona
- Ox Nché
- Sikhumbuzo Notshe
- Dylan Richardson
- Le Roux Roets
- JJ van der Mescht
- Emile van Heerden
- Ruben van Heerden
- Kerron van Vuuren
- Henco Venter
- James Venter
Backs
- Thaakir Abrahams
- Lukhanyo Am
- Curwin Bosch
- Jordan Chait
- Boeta Chamberlain
- Lionel Cronjé
- Caleb Dingaan
- Lucky Dlepu
- Aphelele Fassi
- Jaden Hendrikse
- Rynhardt Jonker
- Werner Kok
- Murray Koster
- Manie Libbok
- Marius Louw
- Makazole Mapimpi
- Sbu Nkosi
- Sanele Nohamba
- Yaw Penxe
- Marnus Potgieter
- Anthony Volmink
- Jeremy Ward
- Grant Williams
- Cameron Wright
Coach
- Sean Everitt

Western Province squad
Forwards
- Jason Alexander
- Juarno Augustus
- Justin Basson
- Dian Bleuler
- Kwenzo Blose
- Hacjivah Dayimani
- Johan du Toit
- Neethling Fouché
- Deon Fourie
- JJ Kotze
- Leon Lyons
- De Wet Marais
- Lee-Marvin Mazibuko
- David Meihuizen
- Simon Miller
- Salmaan Moerat
- Scarra Ntubeni
- Marvin Orie
- Niel Otto
- Evan Roos
- Sazi Sandi
- JD Schickerling
- Chad Solomon
- Marcel Theunissen
- Ernst van Rhyn
- Andre-Hugo Venter
- Reinach Venter
- Ali Vermaak
- Nama Xaba
Backs
- Thomas Bursey
- Angelo Davids
- Juan de Jongh
- Paul de Wet
- Dan du Plessis
- Warrick Gelant
- Lyle Hendricks
- Tristan Leyds
- Godlen Masimla
- Sacha Mngomezulu
- Ruhan Nel
- Sihle Njezula
- Sergeal Petersen
- Rikus Pretorius
- Seabelo Senatla
- Chris Schreuder
- Cornel Smit
- Tim Swiel
- Edwill van der Merwe
- Abner van Reenen
- Sibabalwe Xamlashe
- Leolin Zas
Coach
- John Dobson

== Referees ==
The following referees officiated matches in the competition:

2021 Currie Cup Premier Division referees
- Aimee Barrett-Theron
- Stuart Berry
- Griffin Colby
- Morné Ferreira
- AJ Jacobs
- Cwengile Jadezweni
- Paul Mente
- Rasta Rasivhenge
- Marius van der Westhuizen

== Champions Match ==
On 6 October, the South African Rugby Union announced that fans would get a chance to vote and select their own Currie Cup Select XV. The invitational side played Kenya who used the match a preparation ahead of their international matches in November 2021. The selected Currie Cup XV side was announced on 4 November.

6 November 2021
13:00 SAST (UTC+2)

Currie Cup Select XV (South Africa)	85–17	Kenya
Try: Smit; Hugo (2); Erasmus; Botha; Johannes (2); Coetzee; Gans; Maqondwana (2); Xaba; Theunissen; Con: Thomson (5); Whitehead (5)	Report	Try: Kubu; Tanga; Con: Kubu (2); Pen: Kubu (1)

Loftus Versfeld Stadium, Pretoria
Attendance: 2,000
Referee: Cwengile Jadezweni (South Africa)

Team details

FB	15	(South Africa) Sibongile Novuka
RW	14	(South Africa) Werner Kok
OC	13	(South Africa) Chris Smit
IC	12	(South Africa) Howard Mnisi
LW	11	(South Africa) Stravino Jacobs
FH	10	(South Africa) Brandon Thomson
SH	9	(South Africa) Keagan Johannes
N8	8	(South Africa) Arno Botha
BF	7	(South Africa) Phumzile Maqondwana (c)
OF	6	(South Africa) Nama Xaba
RL	5	(South Africa) Reniel Hugo
LL	4	(South Africa) PJ Steenkamp
TP	3	(Namibia) Aranos Coetzee
HK	2	(South Africa) Schalk Erasmus
LP	1	(South Africa) Simphiwe Matanzima
Replacements:
HK	16	(South Africa) Joe van Zyl
PR	17	(South Africa) Gerhard Steenekamp
PR	18	(South Africa) Mhleli Dlamini
LK	19	(South Africa) Reinhardt Ludwig
FL	20	(South Africa) Marcel Theunissen
SH	21	(South Africa) Paul de Wet
FH	22	(South Africa) George Whitehead
CE	23	(South Africa) Stedman Gans
Coach:
(South Africa) Jake White

FB	15	Darwin Mukidza
RW	14	Jacob Ojee
OC	13	Vincent Onyala
IC	12	John Okoth
LW	11	Brian Tanga
FH	10	John Kubu
SH	9	Samwel Asati
N8	8	Stephen Sakari
OF	7	Dan Sikuta (c)
BF	6	Joshua Chisanga
RL	5	Thomas Okeyo
LL	4	Malcolm Onsando
TP	3	Patrick Oyugi
HK	2	Eugene Sifuna
LP	1	Ian Njenga
Replacements:
HK	16	Bonface Ochieng
PR	17	Andrew Siminyu
PR	18	Melvin Thairu
LK	19	Bethwel Anami
FL	20	Fidel Oloo
SH	21	Barry Robinson
WG	22	Derrick Ashihundu
FB	23	Andrew Matoka
Coach:
(Kenya) Paul Odera

Assistant referees:
Marius van der Westhuizen (South Africa)
Rasta Rasivhenge (South Africa)
Television match official:
Stuart Berry (South Africa)

== See also ==
- 2021 Currie Cup First Division
