= 2024–25 Bulls (rugby union) season =

Season of South African rugby union team

(South Africa) Bulls
- Full name: Bulls
- Union: (South Africa) SARU
- Emblem(s): Barberton Daisy, Bull
- Founded: 1938 (Northern Transvaal Rugby Union); 1997 (Bulls franchise)
- Location: Pretoria, South Africa
- Region: Gauteng
- Ground: Loftus Versfeld Stadium (Capacity: 51,762)
- Director of Rugby: Jake White
- Coach: Jake White
- Captain(s): Marcell Coetzee; Ruan Nortjé
- League(s): United Rugby Championship; European Rugby Champions Cup
- 2024–25: URC: Runners-up; South African Shield: 3rd Ladder : 2nd
1st kit	2nd kit

Official website
- bullsrugby.co.za
- Current season

The 2024–25 season was the Bulls' fourth season in the United Rugby Championship, their 30th season of professional rugby. Along with competing in the URC and its South African Shield competition, the club also participated in the 2024-25 European Rugby Champions Cup. Following the pool stage, the Bulls entered the Round of 16 in the 2024-25 European Rugby Challenge Cup.

The Bulls reached their third URC Grand Final, but for the third time were on the wrong end of the scoreline, as they lost 32–7 to Leinster at Croke Park.

The Bulls drew an average home attendance of 14,245 in the 2024-25 URC season.

== Senior squad ==
The Bulls squad for the 2024–25 United Rugby Championship is.

Bulls United Rugby Championship squad
**Props**: (South Africa) Francois Klopper; (South Africa) Sebastian Lombard; (South Africa) **Wilco Louw**; (South Africa) Simphiwe Matanzima; (South Africa) Khutha Mchunu; (South Africa) Tielman Nieuwoudt; (South Africa) Dylan Smith; (South Africa) Mornay Smith; (South Africa) **Gerhard Steenekamp**; (South Africa) Alulutho Tshakweni; (South Africa) Jacques van Rooyen; **Hookers**: (South Africa) **Johan Grobbelaar**; (South Africa) Tiaan Lange; (South Africa) **Akker van der Merwe**; (South Africa) Joe van Zyl; (South Africa) **Jan-Hendrik Wessels**; **Locks**: (South Africa) Reinhardt Ludwig; (South Africa) Sintu Manjezi; (South Africa) **Ruan Nortjé** (cc); (South Africa) JF van Heerden; (South Africa) Ruan Vermaak; (South Africa) Cobus Wiese	**Loose forwards**: (South Africa) Cyle Brink; (South Africa) **Nizaam Carr**; (South Africa) **Marcell Coetzee** (cc); (South Africa) Mpilo Gumede; (South Africa) **Cameron Hanekom**; (South Africa) Jannes Kirsten; (South Africa) **Elrigh Louw**; (South Africa) Mihlali Mosi; (South Africa) Muller Uys; (South Africa) **Marco van Staden**; (South Africa) Nama Xaba; **Scrum-halves**: (South Africa) Zak Burger; (South Africa) Keagan Johannes; (South Africa) **Embrose Papier**; (South Africa) Bernard van der Linde; **Fly-halves**: (South Africa) Boeta Chamberlain; (South Africa) **Johan Goosen**; (Scotland) **Jaco van der Walt**	**Centres**: (South Africa) Sebastian de Klerk; (South Africa) Stedman Gans; (South Africa) **Cornal Hendricks**; (South Africa) Henry Immelman; (South Africa) David Kriel; (South Africa) **Lionel Mapoe**; (South Africa) Chris Smit; (South Africa) Cornel Smit; (South Africa) Harold Vorster; **Outside backs**: (South Africa) **Kurt-Lee Arendse**; (South Africa) **Aphiwe Dyantyi**; (South Africa) Stravino Jacobs; (South Africa) **Willie le Roux**; (South Africa) **Canan Moodie**; (South Africa) Sibongile Novuka; (South Africa) Sergeal Petersen; (South Africa) Devon Williams
(cx) Denotes team co-captains, **Bold** denotes internationally capped, ^{ST} denotes a short-term signing.

== United Rugby Championship ==
URC Main table

Pos	Team	Pld	W	D	L	PF	PA	PD	TF	TA	TB	LB	Pts	Qualification
1	Leinster (CH)	18	16	0	2	542	256	+286	79	35	11	1	76	Qualifies for home URC quarter-final; Qualification for the 2025–26 Champions Cup
2	Bulls (RU)	18	14	0	4	542	361	+181	71	44	9	3	68	Qualifies for home URC quarter-final; Qualification for the 2025–26 Champions Cup
3	Sharks	18	13	0	5	436	402	+34	55	59	7	3	62	Qualifies for home URC quarter-final; Qualification for the 2025–26 Champions Cup
4	Glasgow Warriors	18	11	0	7	468	327	+141	70	40	10	5	59	Qualifies for home URC quarter-final; Qualification for the 2025–26 Champions Cup
5	Stormers	18	10	0	8	507	418	+89	66	57	11	4	55	Qualifies for URC quarter-final; Qualification for the 2025–26 Champions Cup
6	Munster	18	9	0	9	444	429	+15	67	59	11	4	51	Qualifies for URC quarter-final; Qualification for the 2025–26 Champions Cup
7	Edinburgh	18	8	1	9	471	407	+64	66	57	9	6	49	Qualifies for URC quarter-final; Qualification for the 2025–26 Champions Cup
8	Scarlets	18	9	1	8	427	382	+45	50	52	6	4	48	Qualifies for URC quarter-final; Qualification for the 2025–26 Champions Cup
9	Cardiff	18	8	1	9	409	477	−68	63	65	10	3	47	Qualification for the 2025–26 Challenge Cup
10	Benetton	18	9	1	8	393	478	−85	50	65	7	1	46	Qualification for the 2025–26 Challenge Cup
11	Lions	18	8	0	10	402	440	−38	53	60	5	3	40	Qualification for the 2025–26 Challenge Cup
12	Ospreys	18	7	1	10	437	454	−17	60	63	6	4	40	Qualification for the 2025–26 Challenge Cup
13	Connacht	18	6	0	12	420	472	−52	64	62	9	6	39	Qualification for the 2025–26 Challenge Cup
14	Ulster	18	7	0	11	414	506	−92	59	72	5	5	38	Qualification for the 2025–26 Challenge Cup
15	Zebre Parma	18	5	1	12	302	503	−201	38	72	3	4	29	Qualification for the 2025–26 Challenge Cup
16	Dragons	18	1	0	17	335	637	−302	43	92	1	4	9	Qualification for the 2025–26 Challenge Cup

Source: UnitedRugby.com
Rules for classification: Tiebreakers for teams tied on points: 1) Number of matches won 2) The difference between points for and points against 3) The number of tries scored 4) The most points scored 5) The difference between tries for and tries against 6) The fewest red cards received 7) The fewest yellow cards received.

=== Round 1 ===
The first-round game between Stormers and Bulls was rearranged for 8 February 2025, during the international break for the Northern Hemisphere sides.

8 February 2025
13:00

(2 BP) Stormers (South Africa)	32–33	(South Africa) Bulls (1 BP)

Cape Town Stadium, Cape Town
Attendance: 47,171

=== Round 2 ===
28 September 2024
15:00

Bulls (South Africa)	22–16	(Scotland) Edinburgh (1 BP)
Try: Kirsten 29' c van der Walt 32' m Moodie 63' c Con: van der Walt (1/2) 29'; Chamberlain (1/1) 65'; Pen: Chamberlain (1/1) 68'		Try: Ashman 38' c Con: Thompson (1/1) 40'; Pen: Thompson (3/3) 14', 47', 74'

Loftus Versfeld Stadium, Pretoria
Attendance: 5,500
Referee: Ben Breakspear (Wales)

=== Round 3 ===
5 October 2024
16:00

(1 BP) Bulls (South Africa)	47–21	(Ireland) Ulster
Try: Arendse 5' c Kriel 13' c Grobbelaar 33' c Moodie 41' c Hanekom 55' m Chamberlain 60' c E. Louw 77' c Con: Chamberlain (3) 6', 14', 34'; Kriel (2) 42', 61'; Johannes 78'		Try: Stockdale 8' c Carson 68' c Moore 71' c Con: Doak (1/1) 9'; Humphreys (2/2) 69', 72'

Loftus Versfeld Stadium, Pretoria
Attendance: 6,319
Referee: Ben Whitehouse (Wales)

=== Round 4 ===
12 October 2024
19:35

Ospreys (Wales)	19–29	(South Africa) Bulls (1 BP)
Try: Lake 26' m Conbeer 54' c Morris 79' c Con: Edwards (1/2) 55'; Walsh (1/1) 79'		Try: E. Louw 2' c' Arendse (2) 10' m, 22' c Papier 12' c Con: Chamberlain (3/4) 3', 13', 23'; Pen: Chamberlain 76'

Swansea.com Stadium, Swansea
Attendance: 3,901
Referee: Eoghan Cross (Ireland)

=== Round 5 ===
18 October 2024
19:35

Scarlets (Wales)	23–22	(South Africa) Bulls (1 BP)
Try: Macleod 11' c Murray 41' m Rogers 71' m Con: Lloyd 12'; Pen: Lloyd (2) 40', 52'		Try: Moodie 1' c Burger 15' m Arendse 29' c Con: Chamberlain 2', 30'; Pen: Chamberlain 49'

Parc y Scarlets, Llanelli
Attendance: 5,274
Referee: Federico Vedovelli, Italy

=== Round 6 ===
25 October 2024
19:35

(1 BP) Benetton (Italy)	15–17	(South Africa) Bulls
Pen: Albornoz (4) 1', 34', 62', 72'; Smith 3'		Try: Ludwig 67' c van der Merwe 77' c Con: Kriel (2/2) 68', 79'; Pen: Johannes 22'

Stadio Monigo, Treviso
Attendance: 4,312
Referee: Eoghan Cross, Ireland

=== Round 7 ===
30 November 2024
17:30

Connacht (Ireland)	14–28	(South Africa) Bulls (1 BP)
Try: Hawkshaw 61' c Blade 74'c Con: Forde (2/2) 62', 75'		Try: de Klerk 5' c Papier 35' c Kriel 41' c Moodie 54' c Con: Goosen (4/4) 6', 37', 42', 55'

The Sportsground, Galway
Referee: Mike Adamson (Scotland)

=== Round 8 ===
21 December 2024
17:00

Sharks (South Africa)	20–17	(South Africa) Bulls (1 BP)
Try: Ja. Hendrikse 18' c penalty try Con: Jo. Hendrikse (1/1) 19'; Pen: Jo. Hendrikse (2) 6', 69'	Report	Try: Wiese 24' c Vorster 28' c penalty try 52'; Con: Goosen (2/2) 24', 28'; Pen: Goosen (2) 47', 52'

Kings Park Stadium, Durban
Attendance: 34,827
Referee: Morné Ferreira, South Africa

=== Round 9 ===
22 February 2025
rearranged
14:00

Bulls (South Africa)	31-19	(South Africa) Lions

Loftus Versfeld Stadium, Pretoria
Attendance: 17,501

=== Round 10 ===
25 January 2025
14:45

Lions (South Africa)	22–35	(South Africa) Bulls
Try: van Wyk 33' m Oosthuizen 61' m Pen: Francis (4) 19', 28', 46', 52'		Try: Kriel 15' c Wiese 54' c Coetzee 65' c van der Merwe 69' m Con: Chamberlain 15'; Kriel (2/3) 54', 66'; Pen: Chamberlain (2) 9', 50'; Kriel 58'

Ellis Park Stadium, Johannesburg
Attendance: 19 881
Referee: Marius van der Westhuizen

=== Round 11 ===
15 February 2025
17:00

Bulls (South Africa)	19–29	(South Africa) Sharks (1 BP)

Loftus Versfeld Stadium, Pretoria
Attendance: 23,307

=== Round 12 ===
1 March 2025	(1 BP) Bulls (South Africa)	16–19	(South Africa) Stormers	Loftus Versfeld Stadium, Pretoria
17:00	Try: Vermaak 60' c Con: Kriel (1/1) 61'; Pen: Kriel (3) 5', 24', 26'	Report	Try: Simelane 67' c Con: Matthee (1/1) 68'; Pen: Matthee (4) 1', 15', 32', 37'	Attendance: 34,225

=== Round 13 ===
22 March 2025	Bulls (South Africa)	21-20	(Ireland) Leinster (1 BP)	Loftus Versfeld Stadium, Pretoria
17:00	Try: Grobbelaar, 70' penalty try (7), 57'; Pen: Johannes, 2', 40'; Kriel,	Report	Try: Berrett, 3'c Osborne, 43'c Con: H Byrne, (2); Pen: H Byrne, 4'. 44' 80+4'	Attendance: 15,299; Referee: Ben Whitehouse

=== Round 14 ===
29 March 2025	(1 BP) Bulls (South Africa)	63-24	(Italy) Zebre Parma	Loftus Versfeld Stadium, Pretoria
14:45	Try: Petersen, 3', 73'; Burger, 13'; Jacobs, 30'; Wessels, 36' v. Staden, 47'; Coetzee, 59'; Vorster, 65'; Kriel, 75'; Con: Johannes, 4', 14', 31', 37', 48', 60', 66'; Chamberlain, 74', 76'	Report:ESPN	Try: Trulla, 20'; Montemauri, 41'; Bartolomeo, 57'; Con: Montemauri, 20', 41'; Da Re, 58'; Drop: Alessandro Fusco, 27'	Attendance: 7,673

=== Round 15 ===
19 April 2025	(1 BP) Munster (Ireland)	13 - 16	(South Africa) Bulls	Thomond Park, Limerick
17:15	Try: Abrahams, 37'; Con: Crowley, 38'; Pen: Crowley, 9', 51'	Report	Try: Coetzee,16'; Con: Goosen, 16'; Pen: Goosen, 23', 49'; Johannes, 73'	Attendance: 14,733; Referee: Andrea Piardi

=== Round 16 ===
25 April 2025	(1 BP) Glasgow Warriors (Scotland)	19 – 26	(South Africa) Bulls	Scotstoun Stadium, Glasgow
19:35	Try: Dobie, 34'; Steyn. 77'; McDowall, 79'; Con: Horne, 38', 80'	Report, 2	Try: Greobbelaar, 52'; Kriel, 59'; Con: Goosen, 53', 60'; Pen: Goosen , 17', 24', 40', 55'	Attendance: 7,431; Referee: Andrew Brace

=== Round 17 ===
10 May 2025	(1 BP) Bulls (South Africa)	45–21	(Wales) Cardiff	Loftus Versfeld Stadium, Pretoria
16:45	Try: Vorster, 7'; Louw, 16'; Moodie, 21'; Hanekom, 38' de Klerk, 42', 52'; Con: Goosen, 8'; Johannes, 17', 22', 39', 43', 53'; Pen: Goosen, 3'		Try: Mann, 47'; T Williams, 72'; Hamer-Webb, 76'; Con: B Thomas, 48', 73', 77'	Attendance: 11,497

=== Round 18 ===
17 May 2025	(1 BP) Bulls (South Africa)	55–15	(Wales) Dragons	Loftus Versfeld Stadium, Pretoria
15:00	Try: Kriel, 5'; Wises, 8' de Klerk, 22' v.d. Merwe, 40', 51'; Petersen, 58', 62'; Coetzee, 64'; Williams, 69'; Con: Johannes, 9', 23', 41', 58', 65', 70' (6/9)	Report, 2	Try: Anderson, 43'; Williams, 49'; Morgan, 75'	Attendance: 6,836

=== Play-offs ===
==== Bracket ====
Quarter-finals
1	(Ireland) Leinster	33
8	(Wales) Scarlets	21
4	(Scotland) Glasgow Warriors	36
5	(South Africa) Stormers	18
3	(South Africa) Sharks	24 ^{(6)}
6	(Ireland) Munster	24 ^{(4)}
2	(South Africa) Bulls	42
7	(Scotland) Edinburgh	33

Semi-finals
1	(Ireland) Leinster	37
4	(Scotland) Glasgow Warriors	19
2	(South Africa) Bulls	25
3	(South Africa) Sharks	13

Final
1	(Ireland) Leinster	32
2	(South Africa) Bulls	7

=== Quarter-final ===
31 May 2025	Bulls (South Africa)	42–33	(Scotland) Edinburgh	Loftus Versfeld Stadium, Pretoria
12:30pm	Try: Hanekom, 19'; Kriel, 32'; Vorster, 37'; Moodie, 43'; Johannes, 47'; Nortjé, 52'; Con: Johannes, 44', 48', 53'; Pen: Johannes, 11', 62'; Cards: de Klerk, (yellow card) 3' to 13' v. Heerden, (yellow card) 59' to 69'		Try: Goosen, 5', 64'; Thompson, 14', 29'; Ashman, 59'; Con: Thompson, 6', 15', 30', 60'; Cards: Thompson, (yellow card) 61' to 71'	Attendance: 20,056

=== Semi-final ===
Victory against Edinburgh won the Bulls a home semi-final against fellow South Africans, Sharks.

7 June 2025	Bulls (South Africa)	25–13	(South Africa) Sharks	Loftus Versfeld Stadium, Pretoria
	Try: de Klerk, 8'; Moodie, 22'; Kriel, 67'; Con: Goosen, 9'; Johannes, 68'; Pen: Goosen, 36'; Johannes, 57'	Report	Try: Mapimpi, 45'; Hooker, 53'; Con: Jordan Hendrikse, 27'	Attendance: 47,214

=== Grand Final ===
For the first time since it became the United Rugby Championship, the highest seeded team made the final, and faced the second seed, as all six knockout matches were won by the team with home advantage. Leinster hosted the Bulls in Croke Park, the first URC final to be held outside South Africa, and the first appearance of Leinster in a final since the format began. Bulls reached a record third final. Both teams needed their first URC title, although it would be Leinster's ninth total championship in all formats of the competition. and their twelfth play-off Grand Final. This final was the first between the two teams.

In their previous meeting this season, in Round 13, Bulls inflicted the first defeat of the season across all competitions on Leinster, 21–20 in Pretoria. In all previous URC meetings going back to 2021, Bulls lead Leinster four wins to two, including both previous play-off meetings.

In the final, Leinster proved much too strong for the Bulls in wet conditions, racing to a 19–0 lead at half time. A Bulls try early in the second half briefly raised hopes of a comeback, but Leinster saw out a dominant win with a further try and two penalties, confirming a 32–7 win for their ninth championship in total. The Bulls were consigned to a third URC final defeat in four years.

14 June 2025	Leinster (Ireland)	32–7	(South Africa) Bulls	Croke Park, Dublin
	Try: Jack Conan, 6'; Jordie Barrett, 14'; Josh van der Flier, 23'; Fintan Gunne, 73'; Con: Sam Prendergast, 7', 14'; Ross Byrne, 74'; Pen: Prendergast, 45', 68'		Try: Akker van der Merwe, 51'; Con: Johan Goosen, 51'	Attendance: 46,127; Referee: (Italy) Andrea Piardi

== URC South African Shield ==
2024–25 United Rugby Championship Regional Shield Pools
(South Africa) South African Shield
	Team	P	W	D	L	PF	PA	PD	TF	TA	TBP	LBP	Pts	Pos overall
1	(South Africa) Sharks (S)	6	4	0	2	129	135	−6	17	20	2	1	19	3
2	(South Africa) Stormers	6	3	0	3	142	130	+12	19	15	3	3	18	5
3	(South Africa) Bulls	6	3	0	3	151	141	+10	19	17	3	2	17	2
4	(South Africa) Lions	6	2	0	4	141	157	−16	19	22	1	1	10	11
If teams are level at any stage, tiebreakers are applied in the following order: 1. number of matches won 2. the difference between points for and points against 3. the number of tries scored 4. the most points scored 5. the difference between tries for and tries against 6. the fewest red cards received 7. the fewest yellow cards received
Green background indicates teams currently leading the regional shield. Upon the conclusion of the regular season, these teams win their respective regional shields. (S) : URC Shield champion

== European competition ==
European Rugby Champions Cup Pool 3
Pos	Team	Pld	W	D	L	PF	PA	PD	TF	TA	TB	LB	Pts	Qualification
1	(England) Northampton Saints (3)	4	3	0	1	137	106	+31	20	15	4	0	16	Home Champions Cup round of 16.
2	(France) Castres (6)	4	3	0	1	105	86	+19	13	13	2	0	14	Home Champions Cup round of 16.
3	(Ireland) Munster (9)	4	2	0	2	96	69	+27	13	7	2	2	12	Away Champions Cup round of 16.
4	(England) Saracens (13)	4	2	0	2	91	71	+20	11	9	2	1	11	Away Champions Cup round of 16.
5	(South Africa) Bulls (11CC)	4	1	0	3	84	113	−29	12	15	1	0	5	Away Challenge Cup round of 16.
6	(France) Stade Français	4	1	0	3	76	144	−68	11	21	1	0	5	

Source: EPCR
Rules for classification: Tiebreakers for teams tied on points: 1) Number of matches won; 2) Difference between points for and against; 3) Total number of points for; 4) Aggregate number of points scored in matches between tied teams; 5) Number of matches won excluding the first match, then the second and so on until the tie is settled.

European Rugby Champions Cup : Pool matches

=== Round 1 ===
7 December 2024
17:30

(1 BP) Saracens (England)	27–5	(South Africa) Bulls
Try: Carré 22' m George 48' c Willis 56' c Earl 64' m Con: Burke (2/4) 49', 57'; Pen: Burke (1/2) 35'	Report	Try: de Klerk 10' m

StoneX Stadium, London
Attendance: 9,035
Referee: Craig Evans (Wales)

=== Round 2 ===
14 December 2024
13:00

Bulls (South Africa)	21–30	(England) Northampton Saints (1 BP)
Try: Coetzee 34' c Hanekom (2) 61' c, 69' c Con: Goosen (3/3) 35', 61', 70'	Report	Try: Hendy 31' m Augustus 40' c Freeman (2) 59' c, 76' m Con: F. Smith (2/4) 40+1', 59'; Pen: F. Smith (2/2) 57', 72'

Loftus Versfeld, Pretoria
Attendance: 13,549
Referee: Luc Ramos (France)

=== Round 3 ===
11 January 2025
20:00

(1 BP) Castres (France)	49–10	(South Africa) Bulls
Try: Palis 17' c Baget (3) 63' c, 73' m, 78' c Dumora 70' c Goodhue 75' c Con: Fernandez (2/2) 18', 64'; Popelin (3/4) 71', 76', 79'; Pen: Fernandez (3/3) 31', 45', 57'	Report	Try: Wessels 6' c Con: Chamberlain (1/1) 7'; Pen: van der Walt (1/1) 53'

Stade Pierre-Fabre, Castres
Attendance: 9,876
Referee: Matthew Carley (England)

=== Round 4 ===
18 January 2025
13:00

(1 BP) Bulls (South Africa)	48–7	(France) Stade Français
Try: Penalty try 2'; Williams 12’ c Papier 17’ c Vermaak 26’ m E. Louw 38’ c Chamberlain 46’ c Hanekom 50’ m Con: Goosen (2/3) 13', 18'; Chamberlain (2/3) 39', 47'; Pen: Chamberlain (1/1) 34'	Report	Try: Macalou 23' c Con: Carbonel (1/1) 24'

Loftus Versfeld, Pretoria
Attendance: 10,369
Referee: Adam Leal (England)

=== Play-offs ===
==== Bracket ====
Round of 16
3	(Scotland) Edinburgh	24
14	(South Africa) Lions	12
6	(France) Bayonne	22
11	(South Africa) Bulls	32
7	(France) Pau	24
10	(England) Bath Rugby	49
2	(France) Montpellier	17
15	(England) Gloucester	24
4	(Wales) Ospreys	36
13	(Wales) Scarlets	14
5	(France) Lyon	34
12	(South Africa) Sharks	21
1	(Ireland) Connacht	35
16	(Wales) Cardiff	20
8	(France) Perpignan	18
9	(France) Racing 92	24

Quarter-finals
3	(Scotland) Edinburgh	34
11	(South Africa) Bulls	28
10	(England) Bath Rugby	61
15	(England) Gloucester	26
4	(Wales) Ospreys	18
5	(France) Lyon	20
1	(Ireland) Connacht	40
9	(France) Racing 92	43

Semi-finals
3	(Scotland) Edinburgh	24
10	(England) Bath Rugby	39
5	(France) Lyon	29
9	(France) Racing 92	15

Final
10	(England) Bath Rugby	37
5	(France) Lyon	12

Following the group stages of the Champions Cup, Bulls, who finished fifth in their pool dropped down to the Round of 16 in the European Rugby Challenge Cup. They were designated the eleventh seed and were drawn away against French side Bayonne.

=== Round of 16 ===
5 April 2025
13:30

Bayonne (France) (6)	22–32	(11) (South Africa) Bulls
Try: Mori 32’ m Bourdeau 48’ c Spring 75’ c Con: Spring (1/1) 49'; Tiberghien (1/1) 76'; Pen: Germain (1/1) 5'	Report	Try: Petersen 15’ m Ludwig 38’ c Kriel 44’ c van Staden 67’ c Con: Johannes (2/3) 39', 45'; Goosen (1/1); Pen: Johannes (1/1) 14'; Goosen (1/1) 80'

Stade Jean-Dauger, Bayonne
Attendance: 10,675
Referee: Christophe Ridley (England)

=== Quarter-final ===
12 April 2025
12:30

Edinburgh (Scotland) (3)	34–28	(11) (South Africa) Bulls
Try: Lang, 3’, 24'; Bradbury, 13’ Gilchrist, 42’ Con: Thompson (4/4), 4', 14', 25', 43'; Pen: Thompson, 37', 59'	Report	Try: Kriel, 16', 76' penalty try, 46'; Hanekom, 49'; Con: Johannes (1/1) , 17'; Goosen (2/2), 50', 76'

Edinburgh Rugby Stadium, Edinburgh
Attendance: 4,737
Referee: Pierre Brousset (France)

Bulls are eliminated from the competition.

== Home attendance ==
As of 31 May 2025

Domestic League						European Challenge Cup						Total	
League	Fixtures	Total Attendance	Average Attendance	Highest	Lowest	League	Fixtures	Total Attendance	Average Attendance	Highest	Lowest	Total Attendance	Average Attendance
2024–25 United Rugby Championship	11	195,427	17,766	47,214	5,500	2024–25 European Rugby Champions Cup	2	23,918	11,959	13,549	10,369	219,345	16,872
