= List of Pumas (Currie Cup) players =

This is a list of rugby union footballers who have played for the Pumas in Super Rugby. The list includes any player that has played in a regular season match, semi-final or final for the Pumas, ordered by debut date and name. The Pumas competed in the Super Rugby Unlocked competition.

== Super Rugby players ==
No.	Name	Caps	Tries	C	P	DG	Points	Debut	Last
1	Kwanda Dimaza	1						10/10/2020	10/10/2020
2	Willie Engelbrecht	5						10/10/2020	21/11/2020
3	Eddie Fouché	3		9	6		36	10/10/2020	23/10/2020
4	Marko Janse van Rensburg	3						10/10/2020	21/11/2020
5	Ruan Kramer	5						10/10/2020	21/11/2020
6	Cameron Lindsay	1						10/10/2020	10/10/2020
7	Daniel Maartens	2	1				5	10/10/2020	21/11/2020
8	Neil Maritz	4	4				20	10/10/2020	30/10/2020
9	Morgan Naudé	4						10/10/2020	21/11/2020
10	Ryan Nell	1						10/10/2020	10/10/2020
11	Luther Obi	2						10/10/2020	21/11/2020
12	Le Roux Roets	1	1				5	10/10/2020	10/10/2020
13	Ginter Smuts	5	2				10	10/10/2020	21/11/2020
14	Wayne van der Bank	5	1				5	10/10/2020	21/11/2020
15	Devon Williams	5	1				5	10/10/2020	21/11/2020
16	Niel Marais	4		2			4	10/10/2020	30/10/2020
17	Jeandré Rudolph	4	1				5	10/10/2020	30/10/2020
18	Dian Badenhorst	3						10/10/2020	23/10/2020
19	Simon Westraadt	3						10/10/2020	23/10/2020
20	Darrien Landsberg	5						10/10/2020	21/11/2020
21	Dewald Maritz	3						10/10/2020	30/10/2020
22	Liam Hendricks	5						10/10/2020	21/11/2020
23	Ruwellyn Isbell	1						10/10/2020	10/10/2020
24	Erich Cronjé	4	2				10	17/10/2020	21/11/2020
25	Pieter Jansen van Vuren	4						17/10/2020	21/11/2020
26	Francois Kleinhans	4	1				5	17/10/2020	21/11/2020
27	Etienne Taljaard	4						17/10/2020	21/11/2020
28	HP van Schoor	2	1				5	17/10/2020	21/11/2020
29	Heath Backhouse	2						17/10/2020	23/10/2020
30	Phumzile Maqondwana	4						17/10/2020	21/11/2020
31	Ali Mgijima	4						17/10/2020	21/11/2020
32	AJ le Roux	2						23/10/2020	30/10/2020
33	Ig Prinsloo	2						23/10/2020	21/11/2020
34	Theo Boshoff	2		2			4	30/10/2020	21/11/2020
35	Stephan de Jager	1						30/10/2020	30/10/2020
36	Brandon Valentyn	2						30/10/2020	21/11/2020
37	Chriswill September	2						30/10/2020	21/11/2020
38	Tapiwa Mafura	1						21/11/2020	21/11/2020
