= Boland Cavaliers =

South African rugby union team

- Full name: Boland Cavaliers
- Union: Boland Rugby Union
- Founded: 1939; 87 years ago
- Region: Cape Winelands and West Coast districts of Western Cape Province
- Ground: Boland Stadium (Capacity: 12 000)
- President: Bennie van Rooi
- Coach: Hawies Fourie
- Captain: Thurlow Marsh
- League(s): Currie Cup; SA Cup
- 2026 CC 2026 SA: 6th overall Semi-finalist; 4th overall
Team kit

Official website
- bolandrugby.co.za
- Current season

The Boland Cavaliers (Afrikaans: Boland Kavaliers) are a South African rugby union team that participates in the annual SA Cup and Currie Cup tournament. They draw players from the Cape Winelands and West Coast districts of Western Cape Province, and play out of Wellington at Boland Stadium.

In October 2023 Boland announced a partnership with the Stellenbosch Academy of Sport and a consortium comprising companies controlled by South African billionaires Patrice Motsepe and Johann Rupert.

The partnership sees the Motsepe consortium and SAS own 74% of the Boland rugby professional arm with the Boland Rugby Union retaining 26%.

On the 10th of May 2025 The Sanlam Boland Cavaliers qualified for the semifinal of the SA Cup after beating Eastern Province Elephants 36-22 in a Round Nine SA Cup clash at the Nelson Mandela University stadium in Gqeberha. The victory meant that the Cavaliers finished in the top 4 of the SA Cup and by doing that they qualified for the Currie Cup Premier Division and ended a nine-year wait to play in the Currie Cup Premier Division. They last had the honour of taking on the country's best provincial sides in 2016 before being relegated to the Currie Cup First Division.

== Honours ==
Currie Cup First Division

- Champions: 2001, 2003, 2004, 2006, 2011, 2023, 2024

Vodacom Cup

- Runner-up: 2001

Vodacom Shield

- Champions: 2004

Bankfin Nite Series

- Runner-up: 1997

== Current squad ==
The Boland Cavaliers squad for the 2026 season is:

2026 Boland Cavaliers squad
| **Props**: (South Africa) Andrew Beerwinkel; (South Africa) Doctor Booysen; (South Africa) Mthokozisi Gumede; (South Africa) Dewald Maritz; (South Africa) Heiko Pohlmann (Note: Addition for 2026 Currie Cup); (South Africa) Dayan van der Westhuizen; (South Africa) Ali Vermaak; (South Africa) Laurence Victor; **Hookers**: (South Africa) Llewellyn Classen; (South Africa) Joshua Eras; (South Africa) Darnell Osuagwu (Note: Addition for 2026 Currie Cup); (South Africa) Sidney Tobias; **Locks**: (South Africa) Michael Benadie; (South Africa) Jeandré Leonard; (South Africa) Johnré Stopforth; (South Africa) Marlyn Williams | **Loose forwards**: (South Africa) Sauleigh Arendse; (South Africa) Taine Booysen; (South Africa) Kwanda Dimaza; (South Africa) Gift Dlamini; (South Africa) Keenan Opperman; (South Africa) Khwezi Mafu; (South Africa) Thurlow Marsh **(c)**; (South Africa) Sibusiso Sangweni; **Scrum-halves**: (South Africa) Bentley Geldenhuys; (South Africa) Godlen Masimla; (South Africa) **Louis Schreuder**; (South Africa) Chriswill September; **Fly-halves**: (South Africa) Ashlon Davids; (South Africa) George Lourens; (South Africa) Juan Mostert; (South Africa) James Tedder; (South Africa) Thurlon Williams | **Centres**: (South Africa) David Brits (Note: Addition for 2026 Currie Cup); (South Africa) Erik Lambrecht; (South Africa) Jurick Lewis; (South Africa) Xavier Mitchell; (South Africa) Durin Nasson; (South Africa) Lunathi Nxele; (South Africa) Chris Smit; **Wingers**: (South Africa) Cornell Engelbrecht; (South Africa) Duren Hoffman; (South Africa) Jade Stighling; (South Africa) Marcqiewn Titus; (South Africa) Renaldo Young; **Fullbacks**: (South Africa) Jayden Bantom; (South Africa) Domenic Smit; (South Africa) Craig van Rensburg |
**(c)** denotes the team captain. **Bold** denotes internationally capped players. * denotes players qualified to play for South Africa on residency or dual nationality. Source:
