= Janko Swanepoel =

South African rugby union player

- Full name: Janko Swanepoel
- Born: 8 September 1999 (age 27) Cape Town, South Africa
- Height: 2.00 m (6 ft 6 1/2 in)
- Weight: 107 kg (236 lb)
- School: Stellenberg High School

Rugby union career
- Position(s): Lock, Flanker
- Current team: Honda Heat
Senior career
Years	Team	Apps	(Points)
2021–2024	Blue Bulls	18	(15)
2021–2024	Bulls	23	(5)
2024–	Honda Heat	33	(10)
- Correct as of 23 July 2022

Janko Swanepoel (born 8 September 1999) is a South African professional rugby union player for the Blue Bulls in the Currie Cup. His regular position is lock.

Swanepoel was named in the Blue Bulls side for their Round 5 match of the 2020–21 Currie Cup Premier Division against the Golden Lions. He made his debut in the same fixture, coming on as a replacement.

== Honours ==
- Currie Cup winner 2021
- Pro14 Rainbow Cup runner-up 2021
- United Rugby Championship runner-up 2021-22
