= Evardi Boshoff =

South African rugby union player

- Full name: Evardi Boshoff
- Born: 6 October 1998 (age 28) Upington, South Africa
- Height: 1.83 m (6 ft 0 in)
- Weight: 95 kg (209 lb)

Rugby union career
- Position: Centre
- Current team: Cheetahs / Free State Cheetahs
Senior career
Years	Team	Apps	(Points)
2018–2019	Leopards	26	(27)
2021–	Free State Cheetahs		(5)
2021–	Cheetahs		
- Correct as of 10 July 2022

Evardi Boshoff (born 6 October 1998) is a South African rugby union player for the Free State Cheetahs. His regular position is centre.

Boshoff was named in the Free State Cheetahs squad for the 2021 Currie Cup Premier Division. He made his debut for the in Round 2 of the 2021 Currie Cup Premier Division against the Griquas.
