= Jaco Labuschagne =

South African rugby union player

- Full name: Jaco Labuschagne
- Born: 29 April 1999 (age 27) Ermelo, Mpumalanga, South Africa
- Height: 1.90 m (6 ft 3 in)
- Weight: 102 kg (225 lb)
- School: Afrikaanse Hoër Seunskool

Rugby union career
- Position: Flanker
- Current team: Pumas
Senior career
Years	Team	Apps	(Points)
2021–2022	Bulls	0	(0)
2021–2022	Blue Bulls	9	(5)
2023–	Pumas	12	
- Correct as of 16 September 2022
International career
Years	Team	Apps	(Points)
2019	South Africa U20	7	(0)
- Correct as of 19 June 2021

Jaco Labuschagne (born 29 April 1999) is a South African rugby union player for the Blue Bulls in the Currie Cup and Bulls. His regular position is flanker.

Labuschagne was named in the Blue Bulls squad for the 2021 Currie Cup Premier Division. He made his debut in Round 1 of the 2021 Currie Cup Premier Division against the Western Province, scoring a try.
