= Travis Gordon =

South African rugby union player

- Full name: Travis Gordon
- Born: 15 March 1999 (age 27) South Africa
- Height: 188 cm (6 ft 2 in)
- Weight: 104 kg (229 lb)

Rugby union career
- Position: Flanker
- Current team: Lions / Golden Lions
Senior career
| Years | Team | Apps | (Points) |
| 2019 | Golden Lions XV | 4 | (0) |
| 2021– | Golden Lions | 12 | (5) |
| 2023– | Lions | 5 | (0) |
- Correct as of 14 December 2023

Travis Gordon is a South African rugby union player for the Golden Lions in the Currie Cup. His regular position is flanker.

Gordon was named in the Golden Lions squad for the 2021 Currie Cup Premier Division. He made his debut for the Golden Lions in Round 6 of the 2021 Currie Cup Premier Division against the Griquas.
