= Ruhan Straeuli =

South African rugby union player

- Full name: Ruhan Straeuli
- Born: 4 November 1998 (age 28) South Africa
- Height: 1.94 m (6 ft 4 1/2 in)
- Weight: 112 kg (247 lb)
- Notable relative: Rudolf Straeuli (father)

Rugby union career
- Position: Lock / Flanker
- Current team: Lions / Golden Lions
Senior career
Years	Team	Apps	(Points)
2021–2025	Lions	20	(5)
2021–2025	Golden Lions	23	(15)
- Correct as of 8 April 2025

Ruhan Straeuli (born 4 November 1998) is a South African rugby union player for the Lions in the Pro14 Rainbow Cup SA and Golden Lions in the Currie Cup. His regular position is Flank.

Straeuli was named in the Lions squad for the Pro14 Rainbow Cup SA competition, and was then named in the Golden Lions squad for the 2021 Currie Cup Premier Division. He made his debut for the Golden Lions in Round 1 of the 2021 Currie Cup Premier Division against the Pumas.

On 5 May 2025 it was announced that Straeuli would retire due to a career ending neck injury.
