= FC du Plessis =

South African rugby union player

- Full name: Frederik Carel du Plessis
- Born: 7 February 2001 (age 25) Bloemfontein South Africa
- School: Grey College

Rugby union career
- Position: Fly-half / Centre
- Current team: Mie Honda Heat
Youth career
- 2019: Free State Cheetahs
Senior career
Years	Team	Apps	(Points)
2020–2021	Toulon	4	(0)
2021–2022	Blue Bulls	5	(2)
2021–2023	Bulls	0	(0)
2023–	Mie Honda Heat	0	(0)
- Correct as of 23 July 2022

FC du Plessis (born 7 February 2001) is a South African rugby union player for the Blue Bulls in the Currie Cup. His regular position is fly-half or centre.

Du Plessis was named in the Blue Bulls squad for the 2021 Currie Cup Premier Division. He had previously represented Toulon in 4 appearances during the 2020–21 Top 14 season.
