= Llewellyn Classen =

South African rugby union player

- Full name: Llewellyn Classen
- Born: 12 May 1999 (age 27) South Africa
- Height: 1.75 m (5 ft 9 in)
- Weight: 105 kg (231 lb)
- School: Pretoria Boys High School
- University: University of Pretoria

Rugby union career
- Position: Hooker
- Current team: Boland Cavaliers
Youth career
- 2018–2020: Blue Bulls
Senior career
Years	Team	Apps	(Points)
2020	Blue Bulls XV	2	(5)
2021	Blue Bulls	1	(0)
2021–2025	Pumas	44	(40)
2025	Boland Cavaliers	3	(5)
- Correct as of 10 July 2025

Llewellyn Classen is a South African rugby union player for the Boland Cavaliers in the Currie Cup. His regular position is hooker.

Classen was named in the Blue Bulls squad for the 2021 Currie Cup Premier Division. He made his debut in Round 1 of the 2021 Currie Cup Premier Division against the Western Province.
