= Arno Botha =

South African rugby union player

- Full name: Arnoldus Francois Botha
- Born: 26 October 1991 (age 35) Nylstroom, Transvaal, Republic of South Africa
- Height: 1.88 m (6 ft 2 in)
- Weight: 108 kg (17.0 st; 238 lb)
- School: Nylstroom High School
- University: University of Pretoria

Rugby union career
- Position(s): Flanker, Number 8
- Current team: Lyon
Youth career
- 2009: Limpopo Blue Bulls
- 2010–2012: Blue Bulls
Amateur team(s)
Years	Team	Apps	(Points)
2011	UP Tuks	5	(10)
Senior career
Years	Team	Apps	(Points)
2011–2016	Blue Bulls	34	(30)
2012–2017	Bulls	47	(5)
2017	Blue Bulls XV	1	(0)
2018	London Irish	7	(5)
2018–2020	Munster	43	(40)
2020–2022	Bulls	26	(20)
2020–2022	Blue Bulls	24	(30)
2022–	Lyon	58	(65)
- Correct as of 23 July 2022
International career
Years	Team	Apps	(Points)
2011	South Africa U20	5	(35)
2012–2013	South Africa	2	(0)
2016	South Africa 'A'	1	(0)
- Correct as of 10 April 2018

Arnoldus Francois Botha (born 26 October 1991) is a South African rugby union footballer for Lyon in the French Top 14. His position is either flanker or number 8.

== School and early career ==
Botha began primary school at Laerskool Messina before moving to Nylstroom. He was captain of the rugby first team of Hoërskool Nylstroom for 2 years and he represented Limpopo at the Craven Week competitions in 2008 and 2009.

He represented the Bulls in Super Rugby and the Blue Bulls in the Currie Cup and Vodacom Cup. In 2013, he signed a contract extension to keep him at the Blue Bulls until 2016.

== Representative rugby ==
=== Youth ===
He was captain of the South Africa Under 20 team that competed in the 2011 IRB Junior World Championship in Italy and was also named South Africa Under 20 player of the year.

Botha made his debut for the Springboks against Italy on 8 June 2013 at Kings Park Stadium in Durban as the No. 7 flank. In his second test against Scotland on 15 June 2013 in Nelspruit, Botha left the field after four minutes of play, having ruptured ligaments in his left knee.

=== South Africa 'A' ===
In 2016, Botha was included in a South Africa 'A' squad that played a two-match series against a touring England Saxons team. He didn't play in their first match in Bloemfontein, but started the second match of the series, a 26–29 defeat in George.

== Europe ==
=== London Irish ===
In January 2018, he joined English Premiership side London Irish.

=== Munster ===
Botha joined Irish Pro14 side Munster on a one-year contract for the 2018–19 season. He made his competitive debut on 1 September 2018, starting at number 8 in their opening 2018–19 Pro14 fixture against South African side Cheetahs in Thomond Park, a game which Munster won 38–0. Botha scored his first try for Munster in the provinces 49–13 win against Ospreys on 14 September 2018. Botha made his Champions Cup debut for Munster on 20 October 2018, coming off the bench in the provinces 36–22 win against English side Gloucester in pool 2. He signed a one-year contract extension with Munster in December 2018.

Botha was shown a red card for foul play in the 81st minute of Munster's 10–3 win against English side Saracens on 7 December 2019, and was subsequently banned for three weeks. He scored a hat-trick of tries in Munster's 68–3 win against South African side Southern Kings in round 11 of the 2019–20 Pro14 on 14 February 2020.

== Return to South Africa ==
Botha returned to South Africa to join Blue Bulls in July 2020, and was part of the team that won back-to-back Currie Cup's in 2020 and 2021.

== Honours ==
- Super Rugby Unlocked winner 2020
- Currie Cup winner 2020–21
- United Rugby Championship runner-up 2021-22
