= Niel Otto =

South African rugby union player

- Full name: Cornelius Otto
- Born: 9 May 1997 (age 29) South Africa
- Height: 1.84 m (6 ft 1/2 in)
- Weight: 112 kg (247 lb)

Rugby union career
- Position: Flanker
Senior career
Years	Team	Apps	(Points)
2018	Sharks XV	8	(0)
2021	Western Province	1	(0)
2021	→ Pumas	3	(0)
2022–2025	Griquas	13	(0)
- Correct as of 10 July 2022

Niel Otto (born 9 May 1997) is a South African rugby union player for the Pumas in the Currie Cup. His regular position is flanker.

Otto was named in the Western Province squad for the 2021 Currie Cup Premier Division. He made his debut for Western Province in Round 1 of the 2021 Currie Cup Premier Division against Blue Bulls.
