= Lesley Botha =

South African rugby union player

- Full name: Lesley Botha
- Born: 6 July 2001 (age 25) Bloemfontein, South Africa
- Height: 1.83 m (6 ft 0 in)
- Weight: 90 kg (200 lb)

Rugby union career
- Position: Centre
- Current team: Free State Cheetahs
Youth career
- Montpellier
Senior career
Years	Team	Apps	(Points)
2021–	Free State Cheetahs	1	(5)
- Correct as of 8 September 2021

Lesley Botha (born 6 July 2001) is a South African rugby union player for the Free State Cheetahs. His regular position is centre.

Botha was named in the Free State Cheetahs squad for the 2021 Currie Cup Premier Division. He made his debut for the in Round 4 of the 2021 Currie Cup Premier Division against the Pumas.
