= Eduan Lubbe =

South African rugby union player

- Full name: Eduan Lubbe
- Born: 12 August 1997 (age 29) South Africa
- Height: 1.90 m (6 ft 3 in)
- Weight: 105 kg (231 lb)
- School: Afrikaanse Hoër Seunskool
- University: University of Pretoria

Rugby union career
- Position: Flanker
Senior career
| Years | Team | Apps | (Points) |
| 2017 | Blue Bulls XV | 1 | (5) |
| 2021 | Blue Bulls | 1 | (0) |
- Correct as of 13 January 2022

Eduan Lubbe (born 12 August 1997) is a South African rugby union player for the Blue Bulls in the Currie Cup. His regular position is flanker.

Lubbe was named in the Blue Bulls squad for the 2021 Currie Cup Premier Division. He made his debut in Round 1 of the 2021 Currie Cup Premier Division against the Western Province.
