= Hawies Fourie =

South African rugby union coach

Rugby union career
- Position: Fly-half / Centre / Fullback
Amateur team(s)
Years	Team	Apps	(Points)
–92	Victorians		
1993	Malmesbury		
1994–2000	Ceres		
Senior career
Years	Team	Apps	(Points)
1994–1995	Boland		
- Correct as of 28 October 2015
Coaching career
- Years: Team
- 2001–2002: Ceres (head coach)
- 2002–2005: Boland Cavaliers (head coach)
- 2006: Stormers (backline coach)
- 2006: Boland Cavaliers (backline coach)
- 2007: Boland Cavaliers (head coach)
- 2007–2013: Free State Cheetahs (backline coach)
- 2007–2014: Cheetahs (backline coach)
- 2014–2015: Griquas (head coach)
- 2016–2019: Maties (head coach)
- 2019–2024: Cheetahs (head coach)
- 2024–present: Boland (head coach)

Hawies Fourie is a South African rugby union coach, currently in charge of newly promoted Carling Currie Cup side, Boland Cavaliers. He was also a fly-half, centre or fullback as a player.

== Playing career ==
Fourie spent the majority of his playing career playing for amateur club sides in the Western Cape. He played for the University of Stellenbosch's Dagbreek Koshuis, as well as for the university's second team, Victorians. After playing club rugby for Malmesbury in 1993, he joined Ceres. After playing some provincial rugby for Boland in 1994 and 1995, he helped Ceres win the 1997 Boland Super League and also played in the National Club Championships for the side.

== Coaching career ==
He took up coaching, eventually taking charge of Ceres, where he was in charge until 2002. In September of that year, he was appointed the head coach of provincial side the Boland Cavaliers He coached them until the end of 2005, when he joined Super Rugby side the Stormers as the backline coach. The Boland Cavaliers appointed Rudy Joubert as Director of Rugby and Fourie became the side's backline coach for the 2006 Currie Cup First Division. However, after the side's main sponsor Fidentia went into receivership, they were forced to release Joubert and once again appointed Fourie as the head coach.

After just a few months in charge, Fourie moved to Bloemfontein to take up a role as the backline coach for domestic side the Free State Cheetahs, as well as the affiliated Super Rugby side the Cheetahs. He remained in those roles for seven years, but left after the 2014 Super Rugby season to become the head coach of Kimberley-based side Griquas. He coached them for two seasons, on each occasion helping them qualify form the Currie Cup qualification series to participate in the Premier Division, before returning to Stellenbosch as the head coach of Varsity Cup side Maties.

Fourie led Free State Cheetahs to the 2023 Currie Cup title before leaving to join first division champions Boland, where he led them to a successful defence of their title in the 2024 Currie Cup First Division.
