= Richard Kriel =

South African rugby union player

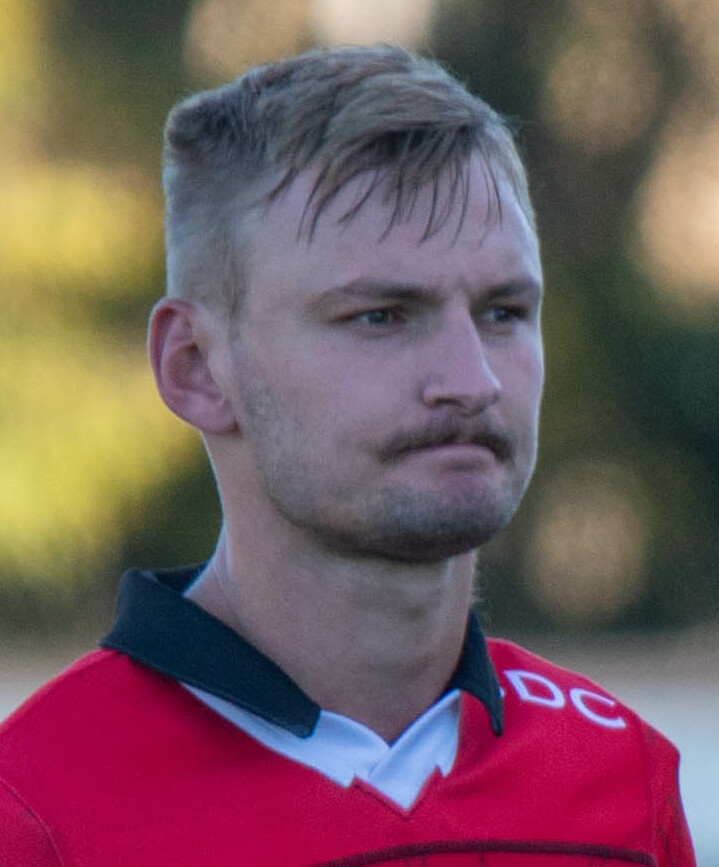
- Full name: Richard Kriel
- Born: 7 July 2000 (age 26) Potchefstroom , South Africa
- Height: 1.94 m (6 ft 4 1/2 in)
- Weight: 97 kg (214 lb)
- School: Grey College
- Notable relative: David Kriel (brother)

Rugby union career
- Position(s): Centre, Full-back, Wing
- Current team: Lions
Youth career
- 2018: Free State Cheetahs
Senior career
Years	Team	Apps	(Points)
2020–2022	Bulls	1	(0)
2020–2022	Blue Bulls	12	(15)
2022–2023	Zebre Parma	12	(10)
2023–	Lions	57	(50)
2024–	Golden Lions	4	(17)
- Correct as of 3 November 2026

Richard Kriel (born 7 July 2000) is a South African rugby union player for the Lions in the United Rugby Championship. His regular position is wing.

Kriel was named in the Blue Bulls squad for the 2021 Currie Cup Premier Division and 2021 Currie Cup Premier Division and for the Bulls squad in the 2021–22 United Rugby Championship season. He made his debut in Round 1 of the 2021 Currie Cup Premier Division against the Western Province, scoring a try. In 2022−23 season he played for the Italian team Zebre Parma in the United Rugby Championship.
