= Mhleli Dlamini =

South African rugby union player

- Born: 25 July 1994 (age 32) Durban, South Africa
- Height: 1.89 m (6 ft 2 in)
- Weight: 149 kg (328 lb)

Rugby union career
- Position: Prop
Senior career
| Years | Team | Apps | (Points) |
| 2018 | Griffons | 1 | (0) |
| 2021–2022 | Bulls | 0 | (0) |
| 2021–2022 | Blue Bulls | 2 | (0) |
- Correct as of 16 September 2022

Mhleli Dlamini (born 25 July 1994) is a South African rugby union player for the Blue Bulls in the Currie Cup and Bulls. Nicknamed Giraffe, his regular position is prop.

Dlamini was named in the Blue Bulls squad for the 2021 Currie Cup Premier Division. He made his debut in Round 1 of the 2021 Currie Cup Premier Division against the Western Province. Dlamini has also played in the Rugby Europe Super Cup with the Tel Aviv Heat.
