= Raegan Oranje =

South African rugby union player

- Full name: Raegan Oranje
- Born: 9 October 1996 (age 30) South Africa
- Height: 1.78 m (5 ft 10 in)
- Weight: 96 kg (212 lb)
- School: Queen's College Boys' High School
- University: University of Pretoria

Rugby union career
- Position: Scrum-half
- Current team: Griquas
Youth career
- Blue Bulls
Senior career
Years	Team	Apps	(Points)
2020–	Griquas	17	(5)
- Correct as of 10 July 2022

Raegan Oranje (born 9 October 1996) is a South African rugby union player for the Griquas in the Currie Cup. His regular position is scrum-half.

Oranje was named in the Griquas side for the 2021 Currie Cup Premier Division. He had previously been named in the Griquas squad for the 2020–21 Currie Cup Premier Division. He made his debut for the Griquas in Round 1 of the 2021 Currie Cup Premier Division against the Sharks.
