= Reinhardt Ludwig =

South African rugby union player

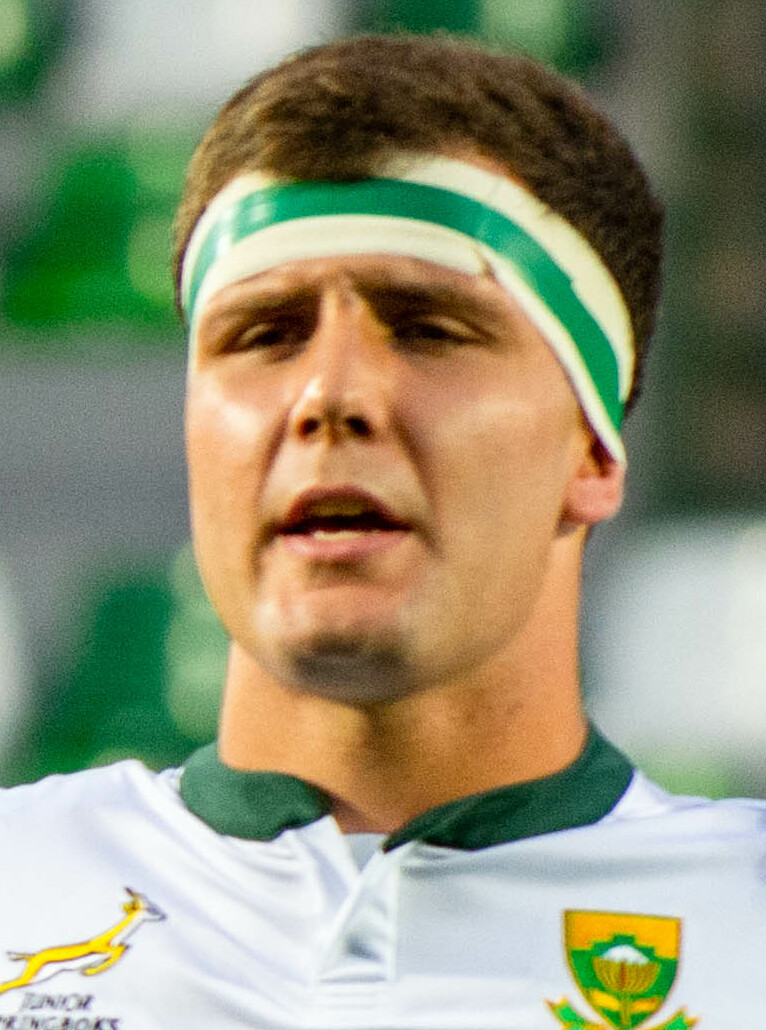
- Full name: Reinhardt Ludwig
- Born: 27 August 2002 (age 24) Pretoria, South Africa
- Height: 1.99 m (6 ft 6 1/2 in)
- Weight: 114 kg (251 lb)
- School: Afrikaanse Hoër Seunskool

Rugby union career
- Position: Lock
- Current team: Bulls / Blue Bulls
Senior career
Years	Team	Apps	(Points)
2021–	Bulls	43	(10)
2021–	Blue Bulls	10	(5)
- Correct as of 21 October 2024
International career
Years	Team	Apps	(Points)
2023	South Africa U20	4	(0)

Reinhardt Ludwig (born 27 August 2002) is a South African professional rugby union player who currently plays for the Bulls in the United Rugby Championship and Blue Bulls in the Currie Cup. His regular position is lock and flanker.

Ludwig attended the prestigious Pretoria based school, Affies. Ludwig was not only headboy, but also captained the first team.

Ludwig was named in the Blue Bulls squad for the 2021 Currie Cup Premier Division. He made his debut in Round 12 of the 2021 Currie Cup Premier Division against the Pumas.
