= Francois Klopper =

South African rugby union player

- Full name: Francois Klopper
- Born: South Africa
- Height: 1.89 m (6 ft 2 in)
- Weight: 130 kg (287 lb)

Rugby union career
- Position: Prop
- Current team: Bulls / Blue Bulls
Senior career
Years	Team	Apps	(Points)
2019	Sharks XV	2	(0)
2021–	Blue Bulls	5	(0)
2022–	Bulls		
- Correct as of 16 September 2022

Francois Klopper is a South African rugby union player for the Blue Bulls in the Currie Cup. His regular position is prop.

Klopper was named in the Blue Bulls squad for the 2021 Currie Cup Premier Division. He made his debut in Round 1 of the 2021 Currie Cup Premier Division against the Western Province.
