= Mihlali Mosi =

South African rugby union player

- Full name: Mihlali Langa Mosi
- Born: 12 May 1996 (age 30) Uitenhage, South Africa
- Height: 1.90 m (6 ft 3 in)
- Weight: 95 kg (209 lb)

Rugby union career
- Position: Flanker / Number 8
- Current team: Bulls / Blue Bulls
Senior career
Years	Team	Apps	(Points)
2018–2019	Border Bulldogs	13	(0)
2021–2022	Free State Cheetahs	18	(15)
2022–	Bulls		
2023–	Blue Bulls		
- Correct as of 10 July 2022

Mihlali Mosi (born 12 May 1996) is a South African rugby union player for the Free State Cheetahs. His regular position is flanker or number 8.

Mosi was named in the Free State Cheetahs squad for the 2021 Currie Cup Premier Division. He made his debut for the in Round 2 of the 2021 Currie Cup Premier Division against the Griquas.
