= David Brits =

South African rugby union player

- Full name: David Benjamin Brits
- Born: 27 April 1997 (age 29) Uitenhage, South Africa
- Height: 1.78 m (5 ft 10 in)
- Weight: 93 kg (205 lb)
- School: Selborne College

Rugby union career
- Position: Centre
- Current team: Cheetahs / Free State Cheetahs
Senior career
Years	Team	Apps	(Points)
2018–2019	Western Province	7	(15)
2021–	Free State Cheetahs	19	(35)
2021–	Cheetahs		
- Correct as of 10 July 2022

David Brits (born 27 April 1997) is a South African rugby union player for the Free State Cheetahs. His regular position is centre.

Brits was named in the Free State Cheetahs squad for the 2021 Currie Cup Premier Division. He made his debut for the in Round 2 of the 2021 Currie Cup Premier Division against the Griquas.
