= Jeandré Leonard =

South African rugby union player

- Born: 22 June 1998 (age 28) South Africa
- Height: 2.01 m (6 ft 7 in)
- Weight: 112 kg (247 lb)

Rugby union career
- Position: Lock
- Current team: Pumas
Senior career
Years	Team	Apps	(Points)
2021–2022	Griquas	4	(0)
2023–	Pumas		
- Correct as of 10 July 2022

Jeandré Leonard (born 22 June 1998) is a South African rugby union player for the Griquas in the Currie Cup. His regular position is lock.

Leonard was named in the Griquas side for the 2021 Currie Cup Premier Division. He made his debut for the Griquas in Round 2 of the 2021 Currie Cup Premier Division against the Free State Cheetahs.

Leonard is a graduate of North-West University.
