= 2006 Currie Cup First Division =

Domestic rugby union competition

In South African rugby union in 2006, the First Division Currie Cup competition was won by the Boland Cavaliers, who beat the Leopards 37–13 in the final on 6 October 2006.

== Results ==
=== October 2006 ===
- 06-Oct-06 Impala Leopards 13 - 37 Fidentia Boland Kavaliers Olén Park

=== September 2006 ===
- 30-Sep-06 Fidentia Boland Kavaliers 38 - 27 Eagles Boland Stadium
- 29-Sep-06 Impala Leopards 63 - 13 Mighty Elephants Olén Park
- 23-Sep-06 Impala Leopards 35 - 26 Border Bulldogs Olén Park
- 22-Sep-06 Mighty Elephants 17 - 36 Eagles EPRFU Stadium
- 22-Sep-06 Griffons 37 - 27 Fidentia Boland Kavaliers North West Stadium
- 16-Sep-06 Eagles 25-Oct Griffons Outeniqua Park
- 15-Sep-06 Border Bulldogs 36 - 57 Mighty Elephants ABSA Stadium - EL
- 08-Sep-06 Mighty Elephants 21 - 26 Impala Leopards EPRFU Stadium
- 08-Sep-06 Griffons 13 - 23 Border Bulldogs North West Stadium
- 08-Sep-06 Fidentia Boland Kavaliers 45 - 15 Eagles Boland Stadium
- 01-Sep-06 Border Bulldogs 16 - 38 Fidentia Boland Kavaliers ABSA Stadium - EL
- 01-Sep-06 Griffons 29-Oct Impala Leopards North West Stadium

=== August 2006 ===
- 25-Aug-06 Eagles 30 - 28 Border Bulldogs Outeniqua Park
- 25-Aug 06 Griffons 28 - 17 Mighty Elephants North West Stadium
- 25-Aug-06 Fidentia Boland Kavaliers 27 - 24 Impala Leopards Boland Stadium
- 19-Aug-06 Impala Leopards 40 - 33 Eagles Olén Park
- 19-Aug-06 Mighty Elephants 12-May Fidentia Boland Kavaliers EPRFU Stadium
- 09-Aug-06 Eagles Aug-47 Mighty Elephants Outeniqua Park
- 05-Aug-06 Fidentia Boland Kavaliers 59 - 0 Griffons Boland Stadium
- 04-Aug-06 Border Bulldogs 19 - 30 Impala Leopards ABSA Stadium - EL

=== July 2006 ===
- 29-Jul-06 Griffons 33 - 36 Eagles North West Stadium
- 28-Jul-06 Mighty Elephants 40 - 32 Border Bulldogs EPRFU Stadium
- 22-Jul-06 Impala Leopards 39 - 37 Mighty Elephants Fanie du Toit Sports Grounds
- 22-Jul-06 Eagles 17 - 38 Fidentia Boland Kavaliers Outeniqua Park
- 21-Jul-06 Border Bulldogs 30-Oct Griffons ABSA Stadium - EL
- 15-Jul-06 Griffons 15 - 59 Impala Leopards Fanie du Toit Sports Grounds
- 15-Jul-06 Fidentia Boland Kavaliers Sep-41 Border Bulldogs Boland Stadium
- 08-Jul-06 Impala Leopards 22 - 22 Fidentia Boland Kavaliers Olén Park
- 08-Jul-06 Mighty Elephants 31 - 26 Griffons EPRFU Stadium
- 07-Jul-06 Border Bulldogs 13 - 19 Eagles ABSA Stadium - EL
- 01-Jul-06 Fidentia Boland Kavaliers 46 - 14 Mighty Elephants Boland Stadium
- 01-Jul-06 Eagles 5 - 48 Impala Leopards Outeniqua Park
