= Harold Vorster =

South African rugby union player

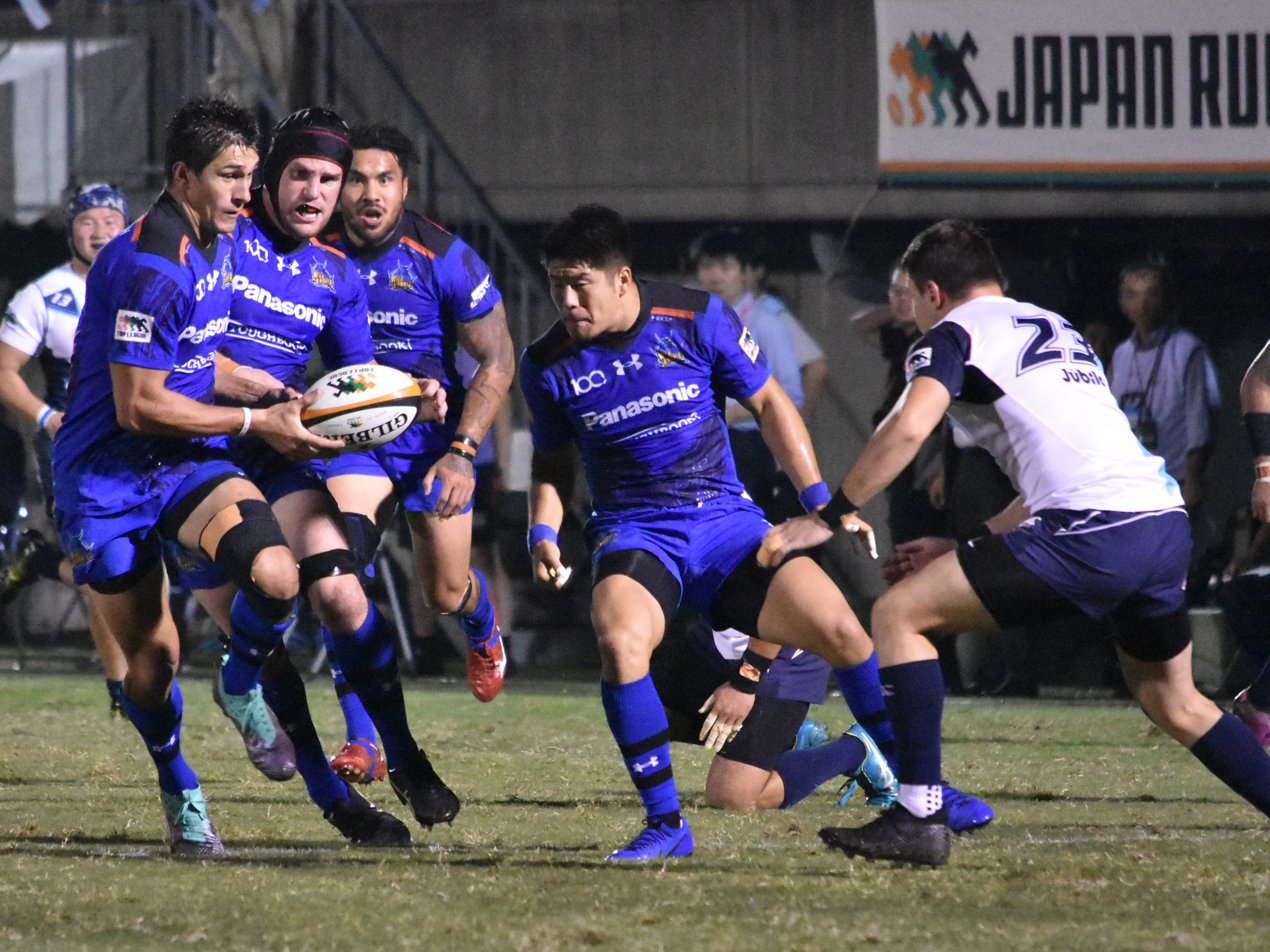
- Full name: Harold William Vorster
- Born: 11 October 1993 (age 33) Phalaborwa
- Height: 1.88 m (6 ft 2 in)
- Weight: 101 kg (15 st 13 lb; 223 lb)
- School: Frans du Toit

Rugby union career
- Position: Centre
- Current team: Bulls / Blue Bulls
Youth career
- 2006–2011: Limpopo Blue Bulls
Amateur team(s)
Years	Team	Apps	(Points)
2014	UJ	7	(5)
Senior career
Years	Team	Apps	(Points)
2012–2014	Golden Lions XV	11	(5)
2014–2017	Golden Lions	16	(5)
2015–2019	Lions	60	(55)
2018–2021	Panasonic Wild Knights	11	(25)
2021–	Bulls	20	(10)
2021–	Blue Bulls	11	(20)
- Correct as of 23 July 2022
International career
Years	Team	Apps	(Points)
2013	South Africa Under-20	0	(0)
2017	South Africa 'A'	1	(10)
2017	Barbarians	2	(0)
- Correct as of 28 May 2018

Harold William Vorster is a South African rugby union player for the Bulls in the United Rugby Championship and the Blue Bulls in the Currie Cup. His regular position is centre or fly-half.

== Career ==
=== Youth level ===
He represented Limpopo Blue Bulls at various youth levels, from the Under-13 Craven Week in 2006 to the Under-18 Craven Week in 2011.

=== S.A. Under-20 ===
He was included in the training group that toured Argentina in preparation for the 2013 IRB Junior World Championship.

=== Golden Lions ===
He joined the Golden Lions in 2012, making his provincial first class debut in their Vodacom Cup match against Leopards. He was also included in the Lions squad for the 2013 Lions Challenge Series.

=== Super Rugby ===
He made his run-on debut for the Lions against the Stormers on 28 February 2015 at Ellispark.

== Honours ==
- Currie Cup winner (2021)
- United Rugby Championship runner-up 2021-22
