= David Kriel =

South African rugby union player

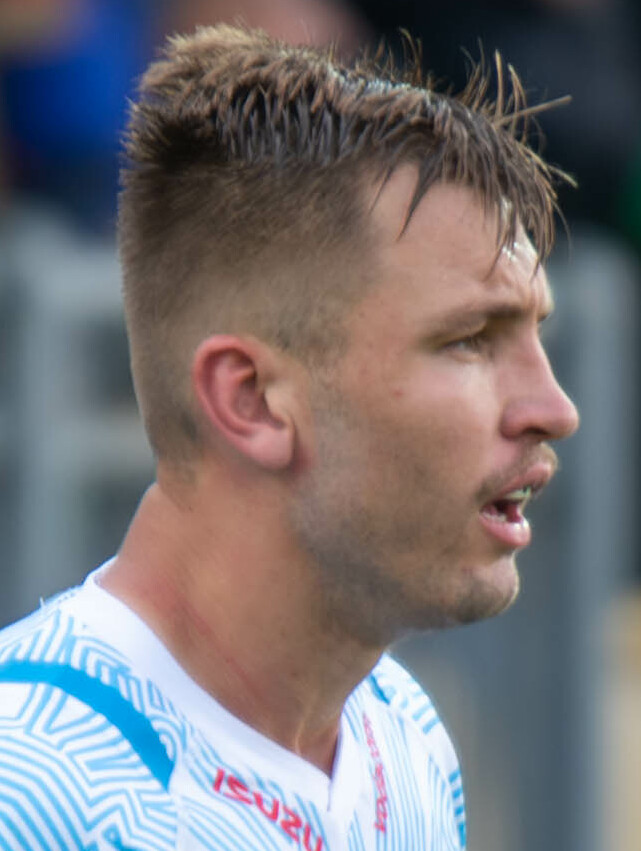
- Full name: David Jacobus Kriel
- Born: 15 February 1999 (age 27) Potchefstroom , South Africa
- Height: 1.95 m (6 ft 5 in)
- Weight: 99 kg (218 lb)
- Notable relative: Richard Kriel (brother)

Rugby union career
- Position: Centre / Fullback
- Current team: Bulls / Blue Bulls
Senior career
| Years | Team | Apps | (Points) |
| 2020 | Stormers | 0 | (0) |
| 2020– | Bulls | 80 | (158) |
| 2020– | Blue Bulls | 20 | (40) |
- Correct as of 23 July 2022

David Kriel (born 15 February 1999) is a South African rugby union player for the Bulls in the United Rugby Championship and for the Blue Bulls in the Currie Cup. His regular position is center but he can be utilised as a utility back.

Kriel was named in the Stormers squad for the 2020 Super Rugby season. Kriel joined the Bulls ahead of the Super Rugby Unlocked competition, joining his brother Richard. Kriel made his debut for the Bulls in Round 1 of Super Rugby Unlocked against Griquas. and played and won Superugby and Currie Cup twice.

== Honours ==
- Currie Cup winner 2020–21, 2021
- Pro14 Rainbow Cup runner-up 2021
- United Rugby Championship runner-up 2021-22
