= Elrigh Louw =

South African rugby union player

- Born: 20 September 1999 (age 27) Pretoria, South Africa
- Height: 1.95 m (6 ft 5 in)
- Weight: 112 kg (247 lb)
- School: Hoërskool Transvalia, Vanderbijlpark

Rugby union career
- Position: Number 8 / Flanker
- Current team: Bulls / Blue Bulls
Youth career
- 2017: Falcons
- 2018–2019: Free State Cheetahs
Senior career
Years	Team	Apps	(Points)
2019–2020	Southern Kings	12	(5)
2020–	Bulls	72	(90)
2020–	Blue Bulls	14	(20)
- Correct as of 23 July 2022
International career
Years	Team	Apps	(Points)
2019	South Africa Under-20	4	(0)
2022–	South Africa	13	(5)
- Correct as of 25 December 2024

Elrigh Louw (born 20 September 1999) is a South African professional rugby union player who currently plays for the Bulls in the United Rugby Championship and for the Blue Bulls in the Currie Cup. He can play as a flanker or 8th man.

Louw attended and played rugby for Hoërskool Transvalia, which earned him a selection to the Falcons squad for the Under-18 Craven Week. After school, Louw moved to Bloemfontein to join the Free State Cheetahs, representing them at Under-19 and Under-21 level. He was also called up to the South Africa Under-20 squad, representing them at the 2019 World Rugby Under 20 Championship in Argentina.

In 2019, Louw joined the Port Elizabeth-based franchise the Southern Kings. He made his first class debut in the opening round of the 2019–20 Pro14 season, coming on as a replacement their 27–31 defeat to the Cardiff Blues. In his second appearance the following week, he scored his first senior try in a 20–31 defeat to Munster.

== Honours ==
- Carling Currie Cup Premier Division Player of the Year 2021
- Currie Cup winner 2020–21, 2021
- United Rugby Championship runner-up 2021-22
- Named in the 2023–24 United Rugby Championship Elite XV team

== International statistics ==
=== Test Match record ===
As of 27 September 2026

Against	P	W	D	L	Tri	Pts	%Won
Argentina	4	3	0	1	0	0	75
Australia	3	2	0	1	0	0	66.67
England	1	1	0	0	0	0	100
New Zealand	2	2	0	0	0	0	100
Portugal	1	1	0	0	0	0	100
Scotland	2	2	0	0	1	5	100
Wales	3	3	0	0	1	5	100
Total	16	14	0	2	2	10	87.5

Pld = Games Played, W = Games Won, D = Games Drawn, L = Games Lost, Tri = Tries Scored, Pts = Points Scored

=== International tries ===
As of 11 July 2026

Try	Opposing team	Location	Venue	Competition	Date	Result	Score
1	Wales	Cardiff, Wales	Millennium Stadium	2024 end-of-year tests	23 November 2024	Win	12–45
2	Scotland	Pretoria, South Africa	Loftus Versfeld Stadium	2026 Nations Championship	11 July 2026	Win	42–28
