= Jan-Hendrik Wessels =

South African rugby union player

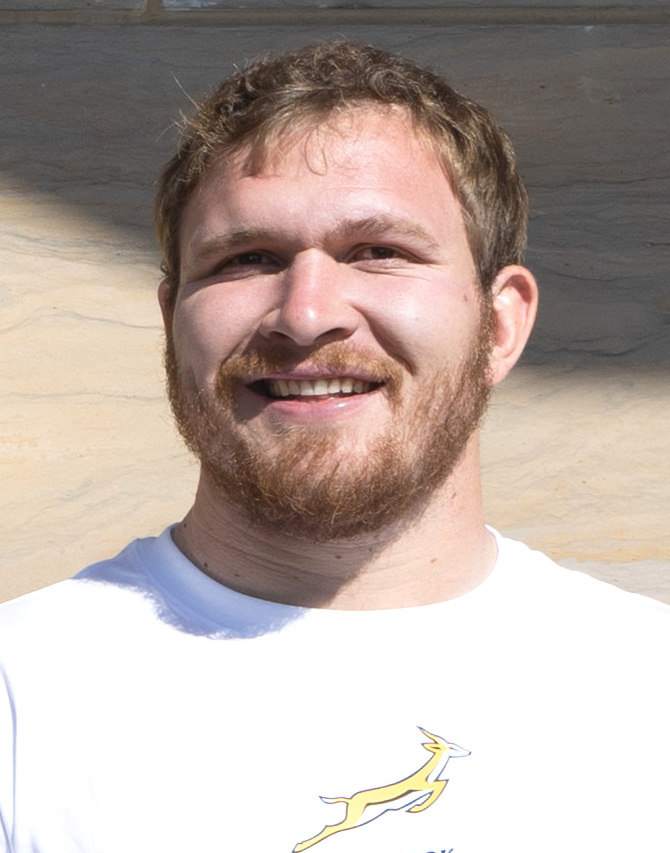
- Full name: Jan-Hendrik Wessels
- Born: 8 May 2001 (age 25) Bloemfontein, South Africa
- Height: 1.93 m (6 ft 4 in)
- Weight: 120 kg (260 lb; 18 st 13 lb)
- School: Grey College, Bloemfontein

Rugby union career
- Position: Prop / Hooker
- Current team: Bulls / Blue Bulls
Youth career
- Clermont
Senior career
Years	Team	Apps	(Points)
2020–	Bulls	41	(20)
2020–	Blue Bulls	13	(25)
- Correct as of 22 October 2025
International career
Years	Team	Apps	(Points)
2024–	South Africa	12	(10)
- Correct as of 18 July 2026

Jan-Hendrik Wessels (born 8 May 2001) is a South African professional rugby union who is a player for the Bulls in the United Rugby Championship, Blue Bulls in the Currie Cup and the South African national team. His regular position is hooker or loosehead prop.

Wessels was named in the Bulls squad for the Super Rugby Unlocked competition. He made his debut for the Bulls in Round 2 of the 2020 Currie Cup Premier Division against the Free State Cheetahs.

== Honours ==
- Currie Cup champion 2021
- 2025 Rugby Championship winner

== Statistics ==
=== Test match record ===
As of 15 November 2026

Opponent	P	W	D	L	Try	Pts	%Won
Argentina	4	3	0	1	0	0	75
Australia	2	1	0	1	0	0	50
England	1	1	0	0	0	0	100
France	1	0	0	1	1	5	0
Italy	3	3	0	0	1	5	100
New Zealand	3	1	0	2	0	0	33.33
Portugal	1	1	0	0	1	5	100
Scotland	1	1	0	0	0	0	100
Wales	1	1	0	0	0	0	100
Total	17	12	0	4	3	15	70.59

=== International tries ===
As of 15 November 2026

Try	Opposing team	Location	Venue	Competition	Date	Result	Score
1	Portugal	Bloemfontein, South Africa	Free State Stadium	2024 mid-year test	20 July 2024	Win	64–21
2	Italy	Gqeberha, South Africa	Nelson Mandela Bay Stadium	2025 Italy tour of South Africa	12 July 2025	Win	45–0
3	France	Saint-Denis, France	Stade de France	2026 Nations Championship	13 November 2026	Loss	21–19
