= Sibusiso Sangweni =

South African rugby union player

Sibusisi Sangweni
- Full name: Sibusiso Sangweni
- Born: 27 November 2000 (age 25) South Africa
- Height: 1.89 m (6 ft 2 1/2 in)
- Weight: 98 kg (216 lb)

Rugby union career
- Position: Flanker
- Current team: Lions / Golden Lions
Senior career
Years	Team	Apps	(Points)
2021–2024	Lions	29	(0)
2021–2024	Golden Lions	23	(20)
- Correct as of 16 July 2024
International career
Years	Team	Apps	(Points)
2019	South Africa U20	2	(0)
- Correct as of 19 June 2021

Sibusiso Sangweni (born 27 November 2000) is a South African rugby union player for the Lions in the Pro14 Rainbow Cup SA and Golden Lions in the Currie Cup. His regular position is flanker.

Sangweni was named in the Lions squad for the Pro14 Rainbow Cup SA competition, and was then named in the Golden Lions squad for the 2021 Currie Cup Premier Division. He made his debut for the Golden Lions in Round 1 of the 2021 Currie Cup Premier Division against the Pumas.
