= PJ Steenkamp =

South African rugby union player

- Full name: Peter-John Steenkamp
- Born: 3 January 1998 (age 28) Bellville, South Africa
- Height: 1.95 m (6 ft 5 in)
- Weight: 118 kg (260 lb; 18 st 8 lb)
- School: Hoërskool Garsfontein

Rugby union career
- Position: Lock / Flanker
Youth career
- 2014: Western Province
- 2015–2016: Blue Bulls
- 2017–2019: Golden Lions
Senior career
Years	Team	Apps	(Points)
2018	Golden Lions XV	1	(0)
2018–2023	Golden Lions	13	(5)
2022–2023	Lions	2	(0)
2023-2025	Toshiba Brave Lupus	1	(5)
2025-	Secom Rugguts	10	(0)
- Correct as of 14 January 2024
International career
Years	Team	Apps	(Points)
2015	South Africa Schools 'A'	1	(0)
2016	South Africa Schools	3	(0)
2018	South Africa Under-20	4	(0)
- Correct as of 25 August 2018

Peter-John Steenkamp (born 3 January 1998) is a South African rugby union player for the Lions in Super Rugby, the Golden Lions in the Currie Cup and the Golden Lions XV in the Rugby Challenge. Currently he belongs to Toshiba Brave Lupus in Japan Rugby League One from 2023-25 Season. His regular position is lock or flank.
