= Sibongile Novuka =

South African rugby union player

- Full name: Sibongile Vukile Novuka
- Born: 1 February 1998 (age 28) South Africa
- Height: 1.92 m (6 ft 3 1/2 in)
- Weight: 98 kg (216 lb)

Rugby union career
- Position: Fullback
- Current team: Bulls / Blue Bulls
Youth career
- 2017: Border Bulldogs
Senior career
Years	Team	Apps	(Points)
2018	Border Bulldogs	1	(0)
2021–	Blue Bulls	6	(5)
2021–	Bulls	0	(0)
- Correct as of 23 July 2022

Sibongile Novuka (born 1 February 1998) is a South African rugby union player for the Blue Bulls in the Currie Cup. His regular position is fullback.

Novuka was named in the Blue Bulls squad for the 2021 Currie Cup Premier Division. He made his debut in Round 7 of the 2021 Currie Cup Premier Division against the Golden Lions.
