= Pieter Jansen van Vuren =

South African rugby union player

- Full name: Pieter Frederik Jansen van Vuren
- Born: 2 April 1991 (age 35) Pretoria, South Africa
- Height: 1.94 m (6 ft 4 1/2 in)
- Weight: 110 kg (240 lb; 17 st 5 lb)
- School: Klerksdorp Hoërskool
- University: University of Pretoria

Rugby union career
- Position: Lock
- Current team: Lions / Golden Lions
Youth career
- 2010: Falcons
Senior career
Years	Team	Apps	(Points)
2017–2018	Griquas	33	(15)
2019	→ Griffons	1	(0)
2020–2021	Pumas	18	(0)
2021–2023	Lions	16	(0)
2022–2023	Golden Lions	4	(0)
- Correct as of 21 April 2023

Pieter Frederik Jansen van Vuren (born 2 April 1991) is a South African rugby union player for Griquas in the Currie Cup. His regular position is lock.
