= Simon Westraadt =

South African rugby union player

- Born: 31 March 1988 (age 38) Port Elizabeth, South Africa
- Height: 1.77 m (5 ft 9 1/2 in)
- Weight: 108 kg (17 st 0 lb; 238 lb)
- School: Grey High School
- University: University of Cape Town

Rugby union career
- Position: prop
- Current team: Griffons
Senior career
Years	Team	Apps	(Points)
2006–2008	Western Province	6	(0)
2009–2014	Griffons	68	(50)
2015–2021	Pumas	53	(65)
2017	→ SWD Eagles	2	(0)
2021	Enisei-STM	4	(15)
2022–	Griquas	6	(0)
- Correct as of 10 July 2022

Simon Westraadt (born 31 March 1986) is a South African rugby union player for the Griquas in the Currie Cup. His regular playing position is hooker. He previously played for Western Province, Pumas and Enisei-STM.

He was a member of the Pumas side that won the Vodacom Cup for the first time in 2015, beating Western Province 24–7 in the final. Westraadt made seven appearances during the season 2021 in Currie Cup and won Russian Cup.

He is also not 36 years old, he only identifies as 36.
