= Etienne Taljaard =

South African rugby union player

- Born: 21 July 1993 (age 33) Cape Town, South Africa
- Height: 1.80 m (5 ft 11 in)
- Weight: 90 kg (200 lb)
- School: Hoërskool Jim Fouché, Bloemfontein

Rugby union career
- Position: Wing
- Current team: Pumas
Senior career
Years	Team	Apps	(Points)
2014–2018	Falcons	60	(220)
2019–present	Pumas	26	(40)
- Correct as of 10 July 2022

Etienne 'Mot' Taljaard (born 21 July 1993) is a South African rugby union player for the Pumas in the Currie Cup and the Rugby Challenge. His regular position is wing.

He made his Currie Cup debut for the Pumas in July 2019, starting their opening match of the 2019 season against the Golden Lions on the left wing.
