= Devon Williams (rugby union) =

South African rugby union player

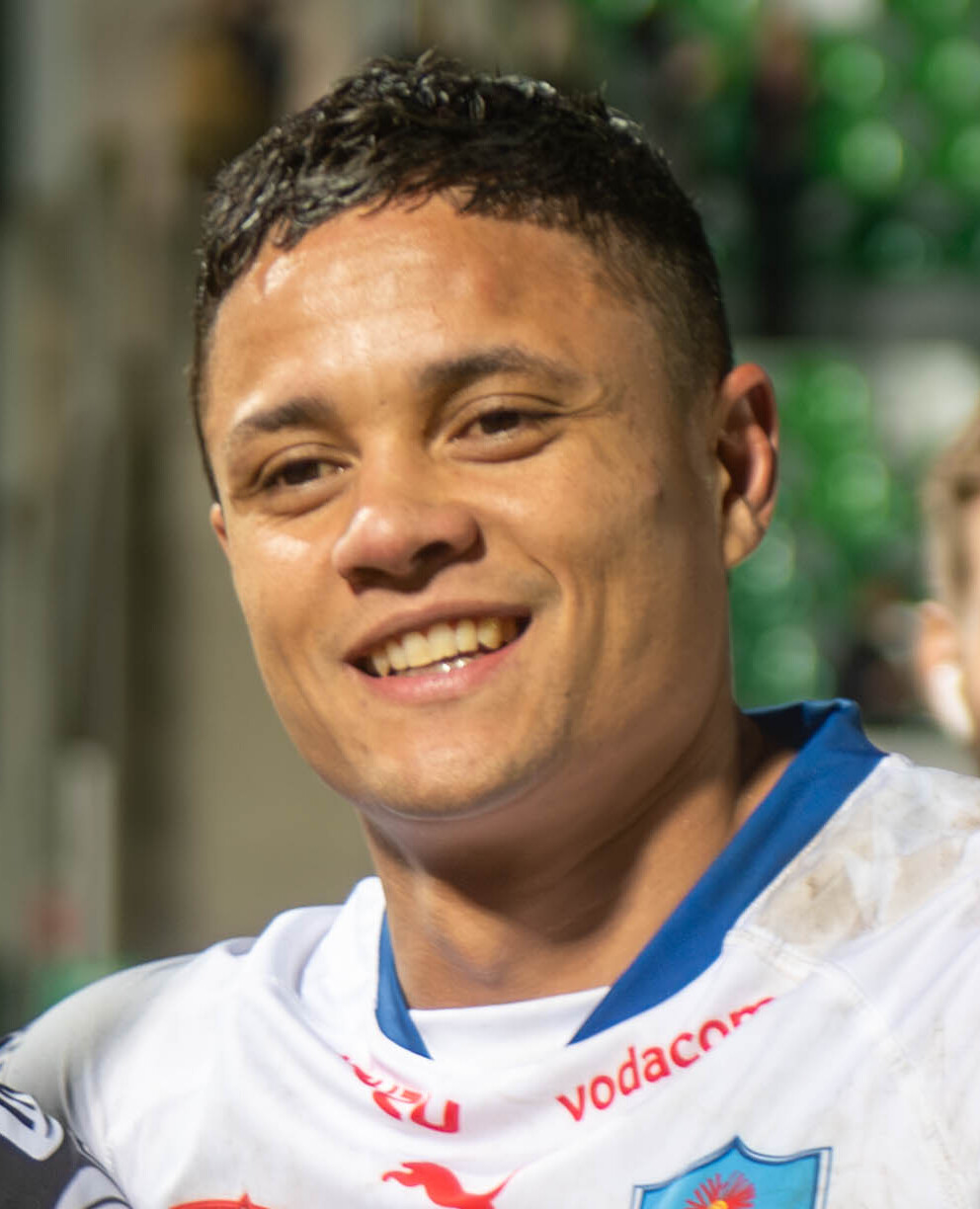
- Full name: Devon Frank Williams
- Born: 16 April 1992 (age 34) Stellenbosch, South Africa
- Height: 1.74 m (5 ft 8 1/2 in)
- Weight: 73 kg (11 st 7 lb; 161 lb)
- School: Paarl Boys' High School

Rugby union career
- Position(s): Winger, Fullback
- Current team: Blue Bulls
Youth career
- 2010–2013: Western Province
Senior career
Years	Team	Apps	(Points)
2013–2016	Western Province	22	(65)
2014	Stormers	3	(5)
2016–present	Pumas	100	(191)
2023–present	→ Bulls		
- Correct as of 10 July 2022

Devon Frank Williams (born 16 April 1992 in Stellenbosch) is a South African rugby union player for the Bulls in the Currie Cup and in the Rugby Challenge. His regular position is winger or fullback.

== Career ==
=== Youth ===
Williams represented Western Province since Under-18 level, playing for them at the Academy Week and Craven Week tournaments in 2010. In 2011, he played for the Western Province U19 side in the 2011 Under-19 Provincial Championship competition, scoring three tries in thirteen appearances. He played for the Western Province U21 side in 2012 (finishing joint-fifth top try scorer with six tries in just seven starts, despite missing a large part of the season through injury) and 2013, scoring eight tries in fourteen starts and winning the "U21 Back of the Year" award.

=== Senior career ===
His first taste of senior rugby came in 2013, when he was included in the Western Province squad for the 2013 Vodacom Cup competition. He made his debut in the opening match of the season, starting on the left wing in their 17–17 draw with the Boland Cavaliers in Ceres, scoring a 22nd-minute try in the process. He started in eight of Western Province's nine matches in the competition, scoring one more try in their match against the Border Bulldogs.

His 2014 Vodacom Cup campaign saw him score an incredible nine tries in the first six matches of the competition. He scored two tries in their opening match against the Boland Cavaliers, one each in their matches against the Eastern Province Kings, the Border Bulldogs and Free State XV and four tries in their 65–29 victory over Kenyan representative side Simba XV.

He was included in the Stormers squad for their 2014 Super Rugby Round 10 match against the Lions. He twice came on as a blood-bin substitute to make his Super Rugby debut. His first start came in the Stormers' next match, away to the Cheetahs.

=== Sevens ===
He joined the South Africa Sevens Academy in 2014.
