= Sebastian de Klerk =

South African rugby union player

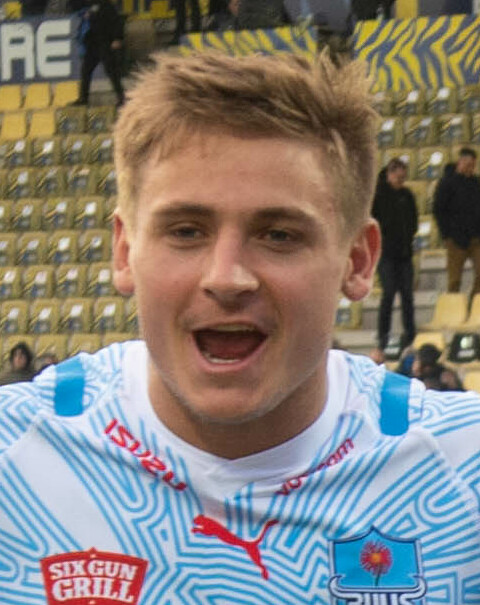
- Full name: Sebastian de Klerk
- Born: 5 April 2000 (age 26) Cape Town, South Africa
- Height: 1.80 m (5 ft 11 in)
- Weight: 91 kg (201 lb)
- School: Hoër Landbouskool Boland, Paarl

Rugby union career
- Position: Centre / Wing
- Current team: Blue Bulls
Senior career
Years	Team	Apps	(Points)
2021–2023	Pumas	21	(50)
2023–	Blue Bulls	6	(10)
- Correct as of 25 November 2023

Sebastian de Klerk (born 5 April 2000) is a South African professional rugby union player for the Blue Bulls in the United Rugby Championship. His regular positions are Centre or Wing.

De Klerk was named in the Pumas side for their Round 7 match of the 2020–21 Currie Cup Premier Division against the Blue Bulls. He made his debut in the same fixture, coming on as a replacement centre.

== Honours ==
- Currie Cup winner 2022
