= Boeta Chamberlain =

South African rugby union player

Henry 'Boeta' Chamberlain
- Full name: Henry Chamberlain
- Born: 22 February 1999 (age 27)
- Height: 181 cm (5 ft 11 in)
- Weight: 86 kg (190 lb)
- School: Paarl Boys' High School

Rugby union career
- Position: Fly-half
- Current team: Lions
Senior career
Years	Team	Apps	(Points)
2019	Sharks XV	2	(16)
2019–2024	Sharks (Currie Cup)	10	(75)
2020–2024	Sharks	46	(172)
2024–2025	Bulls	10	(56)
2024–2025	Blue Bulls	5	(64)
2025–2026	Newcastle Red Bulls	12	(2)
2026–	Lions	6	(7)
- Correct as of 3 November 2026
International career
Years	Team	Apps	(Points)
2019	South Africa U20	3	

Henry 'Boeta' Chamberlain (born 22 February 1999) is a South African rugby union player. He plays as a fly-half or full-back for the Lions, competing in both the United Rugby Championship and the Currie Cup.

== Career ==
He was a member of the South Africa Under 20 team that competed in the U20 International Series making 3 test appearances.

Chamberlain made his Currie Cup debut for the Sharks in August 2019, starting their match in Round Six of the 2019 season against the Golden Lions and kicking a drop-goal shortly before half-time in a 30–28 victory.

In 2021 Chamberlain put on a drop goal masterclass against Ospreys with 3 drop goals, guiding the Sharks to a comfortable 27–13 win in the URC.

In May 2024 Boeta was part of the Sharks squad that became the first South African franchise to win silverware in a European competition.

In July 2024 Boeta joined the Bulls making his debut in July 2024 in the Currie Cup against Western Province.

In August 2025, Chamberlain agreed a one-year deal with Prem Rugby side Newcastle Red Bulls, following the conclusion of the 2025 Currie Cup.

On 16 July 2026, the Lions had confirmed that Chamberlain had agreed a deal to join the Johannesburg-based team and return to South Africa.
