= Thaakir Abrahams =

South African rugby union player

- Full name: Thaakir Abrahams
- Born: 10 January 1999 (age 27) South Africa
- Height: 1.75 m (5 ft 9 in)
- Weight: 75 kg (165 lb)
- School: Paarl Boys High

Rugby union career
- Position: Wing / Fullback
- Current team: Munster
Senior career
Years	Team	Apps	(Points)
2020–2024	Sharks (Currie Cup)	9	(25)
2020–2023	Sharks	14	(25)
2023–2024	Lyon	8	(5)
2024–	Munster	25	(25)
- Correct as of 09 May 2026

Thaakir Abrahams (born 10 January 2000) is a South African rugby union player, who plays for the Vodacom Bulls. His regular position is wing or fullback.

== Sharks ==
Abrahams was named in the Sharks squad for both the 2020 Super Rugby season and the subsequent Super Rugby Unlocked competition. Abrahams made his Sharks debut in Round 1 of the Super Rugby Unlocked competition against the Lions.

== Lyon ==
Abrahams joined Lyon ahead of the 2023/24 Top 14 season. He also featured in Lyon's Champions Cup campaign, featuring in four of their five games, scoring five tries.

== Munster ==
On 29 May 2024, it was announced that Abrahams had signed a two-year deal to join Munster for the 2024-25 season.

Abrahams made his competitive Munster debut in the first round of the 2024-25 United Rugby Championship victory against Connacht. He would then suffer a thigh injury in the province's loss to Zebre which ruled him out for a number of weeks. He would score his first Munster try on his return from injury in the province's 17-10 victory on 30th November 2024 against South African side Lions.

Thaakir Abrahams made a try scoring Champions Cup debut against Munster's 33-7 victory over Parisian side Stade Francais on 7th December 2024, in which he won Player Of The Match.

Abrahams would help Munster greatly in their Round of 16 victory away to La Rochelle on the 7th April 2025, making a line break that ultimately saw Craig Casey score a try under the posts.

Abrahams scored Munster's only try in their narrow, 13-16 loss to URC side Bulls, in Round 15 of the 2024-25 United Rugby Championship.

Abrahams helped secure Munster's place in the playoffs with a try against Benetton in Musgrave Park in the Irish province's 30-21 bonus point win over the Italian side.
