= Phumzile Maqondwana =

South African rugby player (born 1997)

- Born: 16 March 1997 (age 29) Elliotdale, South Africa
- Height: 1.87 m (6 ft 1 1/2 in)
- Weight: 104 kg (229 lb)
- School: Selborne College
- University: University of the Free State

Rugby union career
- Position: Flank
- Current team: Bulls / Blue Bulls
Senior career
Years	Team	Apps	(Points)
2018	Golden Lions XV	11	(15)
2019–2022	Pumas	43	(15)
2022–	Bulls		
2023–	Blue Bulls		
- Correct as of 10 July 2022

Phumzile Maqondwana (born 16 March 1997) is a South African rugby union player for the Vodacom Bulls in the United Rugby Championship and the Currie Cup. His regular position is flank.

He made his Currie Cup debut for the Pumas in July 2019, coming on as a replacement in their opening match of the 2019 season against the Golden Lions.
