= Dewald Maritz =

South African rugby union player

- Full name: Dewald Maritz
- Born: 9 January 1998 (age 28) South Africa
- Height: 1.98 m (6 ft 6 in)
- Weight: 107 kg (236 lb)

Rugby union career
- Position: Prop
- Current team: Pumas
Senior career
Years	Team	Apps	(Points)
2018	Blue Bulls XV	1	(5)
2020–	Pumas	26	(5)
- Correct as of 10 July 2022

Dewald Maritz (born 9 January 1998) is a South African rugby union player for the Pumas in the Currie Cup. His regular position is prop.

He joined the Pumas ahead of the newly formed Super Rugby Unlocked competition in October 2020. Maritz made his debut in Round 1 of Super Rugby Unlocked against the Cheetahs.
