= Kwanda Dimaza =

South African rugby union player

- Born: 8 October 1997 (age 29) South Africa
- Height: 1.95 m (6 ft 5 in)
- Weight: 107 kg (236 lb)

Rugby union career
- Position: Flanker / Number 8
- Current team: Pumas
Senior career
Years	Team	Apps	(Points)
2018–2019	Sharks XV	16	(20)
2019	Sharks	0	(0)
2020	Pumas	38	(5)
- Correct as of 25 October 2024

Kwanda Dimaza (born 8 October 1997) is a South African rugby union player for the Pumas in the Currie Cup. His regular position is flanker or number 8.

Dimaza was previously named in the Sharks squad for the 2019 Super Rugby season. He joined the Pumas ahead of the newly formed Super Rugby Unlocked competition in October 2020. Dimaza made his debut in Round 1 of Super Rugby Unlocked against the Cheetahs.
