= Chris Smit =

South African rugby union player

- Full name: Christiaan Smit
- Born: 1 August 1995 (age 31)
- Height: 1.82 m (5 ft 11 1/2 in)
- Weight: 86 kg (190 lb)
- School: Paul Roos Gymnasium, Stellenbosch
- University: University of Stellenbosch

Rugby union career
- Position: Centre / Fly-half
- Current team: Bulls / Blue Bulls
Amateur team(s)
Years	Team	Apps	(Points)
2015–2019	Maties		
Senior career
Years	Team	Apps	(Points)
2019	Griquas	9	(15)
2019–2022	Cheetahs	6	(5)
2020–2022	Free State Cheetahs	12	(5)
2022–	Bulls		
2023–	Blue Bulls		
- Correct as of 16 September 2022

Christiaan Smit (born 1 August 1995) is a South African rugby union player for the Cheetahs in the Pro14. His regular position is centre or fly-half.

Smit made his Currie Cup debut for Griquas in July 2019, coming on as a replacement in their third match of the 2019 season against the Free State Cheetahs.

Smit joined the Cheetahs prior to the 2019–20 Pro14 season.
