= Chriswill September =

South African rugby union player

- Full name: Chriswill Bradley September
- Born: 30 June 1994 (age 32) Worcester, South Africa
- Height: 1.72 m (5 ft 7 1/2 in)
- Weight: 79 kg (174 lb)
- School: HTS Drostdy

Rugby union career
- Position: Scrum-half
- Current team: Pumas
Senior career
| Years | Team | Apps | (Points) |
| 2014–2015 | Leopards XV | 3 | (0) |
| 2016–2019 | Leopards | 51 | (10) |
| 2019 | Griquas | 8 | (0) |
| 2020– | Pumas | 24 | (10) |
- Correct as of 10 July 2022

Chriswill Bradley September (born 30 June 1994) is a South African rugby union player for Griquas in the Currie Cup and the Rugby Challenge. His regular position is scrum-half.

He made his Currie Cup debut for Griquas in July 2019, coming on as a replacement scrum-half in their opening match of the 2019 season against the Sharks.
