= 2026 Currie Cup Premier Division =

Domestic rugby union competition

- Countries: South Africa
- Date: 17 July – 12 September
- Champions: Griquas (5th title)
- Runners-up: Pumas
- Matches played: 31
- Tries scored: 260 (average 8.4 per match)
- Top point scorer: George Whitehead (Griquas, 63 points)
- Top try scorer: Tiaan Lange (Griquas, 9 tries)

The 2026 Currie Cup Premier Division is the 88th edition of the Currie Cup, the premier domestic rugby union competition in South Africa, and the oldest provincial rugby competition in the world. The competition is sponsored by beer brand Carling Black Label and organized by the South African Rugby Union.

The competition featured the four teams associated with the teams playing in the United Rugby Championship, as well as the four teams finishing top of the 2026 SA Cup. The same teams that qualified for the 2025 Currie Cup Premier Division all qualified again. The competition's most successful team, Western Province, was rebranded as the Stormers XXIII, to consolidate their United Rugby Championship and Currie Cup brands.

== Teams ==
Team locations in the 2026 Currie Cup Premier Division

The eight competing teams are:

2026 Currie Cup Premier Division
Team	Sponsored name	Stadium	Sponsored stadia name	Capacity
Boland Cavaliers	Sanlam Boland Kavaliers	Boland Stadium, Wellington	—N/a	12,000
Bulls XV	Vodacom Bulls XV	Loftus Versfeld, Pretoria	—N/a	51,762
Cheetahs	Toyota Cheetahs	Free State Stadium, Bloemfontein	Toyota Stadium	48,000
Griquas	Suzuki Griquas	Griqua Park, Kimberley	Suzuki Stadium	11,000
Lions	Fidelity ADT Lions	Ellis Park, Johannesburg; Bidvest Stadium, Johannesburg; UJ Stadium, Johannesburg	10bet Ellis Park; N/A; N/A	62,567; 5,000; 8,000
Pumas	Airlink Pumas	Mbombela Stadium, Mbombela	—N/a	43,500
Sharks XV	Hollywoodbets Sharks XV	Kings Park Stadium, Durban; Princess Magogo Stadium, KwaMashu; Woodburn Stadium, Pietermaritzburg	Hollywoodbets Kings Park; N/A; N/A	54,000; 12,000; 12,000
Stormers XXIII	DHL Stormers XXIII	Cape Town Stadium, Cape Town; Athlone Stadium, Cape Town	DHL Stadium; N/A	55,000; 34,000

== Regular season ==
=== Standings ===
2026 Currie Cup Premier Division standings
Pos	Team	Pld	W	D	L	PF	PA	PD	TF	TA	B	Pts	Qualification
1	Griquas	7	6	0	1	271	143	+128	40	20	7	31	Semifinals
2	Cheetahs	7	5	0	2	245	226	+19	37	34	7	27	Semifinals
3	Pumas	7	4	0	3	201	195	+6	29	28	6	22	Semifinals
4	Lions	7	3	1	3	227	180	+47	32	26	6	20	Semifinals
5	Sharks XV	7	3	1	3	190	214	−24	30	34	4	18	
6	Boland Cavaliers	7	3	0	4	171	162	+9	23	22	4	16	
7	Stormers XXIII	7	3	0	4	159	210	−51	22	31	4	16	
8	Bulls XV	7	0	0	7	186	320	−134	29	47	6	6	

Source: SA Rugby

Tournament points in the standings were awarded to teams as follows:

- 4 points for a win.
- 2 points for a draw.
- 1 bonus point for a loss in a match by seven points or under.
- 1 bonus point for scoring four tries or more.

Teams were ranked in the standings by tournament points. Had two or more teams tied on points the tie would have been broken by: (a) points difference from all matches (points scored less points conceded); (b) tries difference from all matches (tries scored less tries conceded); (c) points difference from the matches between the tied teams; (d) points scored in all matches; (e) tries scored in all matches; and, if needed, (f) a coin toss.

== Fixtures ==
=== Round 1 ===
17 July 2026	Pumas (2 BP)	24–26	Sharks XV (1 BP)	Mbombela Stadium, Mbombela
17:00 SAST	Try: Msenge 8'; Van Zyl 55'; Swanepoel 62'; Scheepers 67'; Con: Fleurs (2/4) 63', 67'	Report	Try: Matthews (3) 22', 29', 40'; Van Vuuren 44'; Con: Swiel (3/4) 23', 40+1', 45'	Referee: Juan de Bod

17 July 2026	Stormers XXIII	25–19	Griquas (1 BP)	Cape Town Stadium, Cape Town
19:05 SAST	Try: Paulo 38'; Ndhlovu 45'; Ungerer 79'; Con: Malgas (2/2) 47', 80'; Pen: Du Plessis 3'; Malgas 52'; Cards: Grobler (yellow card) 17'; Smit (yellow card) 22'; Fuller (yellow card) 58'	Report	Try: Makata 10'; Oosthuizen 28'; Lange 55'; Con: Whitehead (2/3) 10', 56'; Cards: Pretorius (red card) 58'; Van der Merwe (yellow card) 74'	Referee: Stephan Geldenhuys

19 July 2026	Cheetahs (1 BP)	29–27	Lions (2 BP)	Free State Stadium, Bloemfontein
13:00 SAST	Try: Janse van Rensburg 12'; R. Uys 21'; Sekekete 57'; Jasper 68'; Pen: Van der Walt (3) 4', 38', 75'	Report	Try: Finca (3) 15', 40', 44'; Nela 70'; Con: Francis (2/4) 45', 72'; Pen: Francis 7'	Referee: Dylen November

19 July 2026	Boland Cavaliers	24–10	Bulls XV	Boland Stadium, Wellington
15:05 SAST	Try: Eras 6'; Van der Westhuizen 26; Penalty try 74'; Con: Tedder (1/1) 7'; Bantom (1/1) 27'; Pen: Bantom 48'; Cards: September (yellow card) 80'	Report	Try: Schurmann 58'; Con: Johannes (1/1) 59'; Pen: Johannes 40+2'; Cards: Janse van Rensburg (yellow card) 15'; Xaba (yellow card) 74'	Referee: Griffin Colby

=== Round 2 ===
24 July 2026	Cheetahs (1 BP)	43–21	Sharks XV	Free State Stadium, Bloemfontein
17:00 SAST	Try: Nkabinde (3) 3', 52', 66'; De Klerk (2) 13', 78'; J. Venter 43'; Maartens 76'; Con: Van der Walt (4/7) 4', 14', 76', 79'; Cards: Thomas (yellow card) 49'	Report	Try: Purchase 10'; Ngobese 26'; Potgieter 50'; Con: Swiel (3/3) 11', 26', 51'; Cards: Calvert (yellow card) 75'	Referee: Hanru van Rooyen

25 July 2026	Lions (1 BP)	52–29	Pumas (1 BP)	Ellis Park, Johannesburg
15:00 SAST	Try: Finca 10'; Cairns (2) 16', 45'; Penalty try 30'; Nela (2) 49', 74'; Jonker 54'; Con: Francis (6/6) 11', 16', 46', 49', 55', 75'; Pen: Francis 68'; Cards: Naudé (yellow card) 33'	Report	Try: Scheepers 26'; Marais 33'; Van Eden 58'; Blood 69'; Con: Visagie (3/4) 27', 34', 59'; Pen: Visagie 8'; Cards: Blood (yellow card) 30'; Ndimande (yellow card) 66'; Delport (yellow card) 78'	Referee: Griffin Colby

25 July 2026	Griquas (1 BP)	56–26	Bulls XV (1 BP)	Griqua Park, Kimberley
17:05 SAST	Try: Alexander (3) 12', 25', 51'; Wehr (3) 14', 71', 76'; Prinsloo 37'; Oosthuizen 49'; Con: Whitehead (8/8) 12', 15', 26', 37', 49', 52', 72', 77'	Report	Try: Van Niekerk 2'; Kunene 23'; Williams 40+3'; Bam 67'; Con: Johannes (2/3) 23', 40+4'; Mentoor (1/1) 67'	Referee: Morné Ferreira

26 July 2026	Boland Cavaliers (1 BP)	41–3	Stormers XXIII	Boland Stadium, Wellington
15:00 SAST	Try: D. Smit 3'; Mitchell 5'; Eras 46'; Bantom (3) 56', 62', 78'; Con: Bantom (4/6) 47', 57', 63', 78'; Pen: Bantom 37'	Report	Pen: Malgas 20'	Referee: AJ Jacobs

=== Round 3 ===
31 July 2026	Griquas (1 BP)	24–21	Cheetahs (1 BP)	Griqua Park, Kimberley
19:00 SAST	Try: Lange (2) 21', 62'; Els 34'; Alexander 37'; Con: Whitehead (2/4) 22', 63'	Report	Try: Miller 9'; Janse van Rensburg 52'; Nkabinde 72'; Con: Jasper (3/3) 10', 52', 72'; Cards: De Klerk (yellow card) 39'; Venter (yellow card) 75'	Referee: Christopher Allison

1 August 2026	Stormers XXIII (1 BP)	36–28	Sharks XV (1 BP)	Cape Town Stadium, Cape Town
15:00 SAST	Try: Paulo 8'; Mlaba 22'; Muller 36'; Boulle 64'; Nyali 69'; Con: K. Smith (4/5) 9', 23', 64', 70'; Pen: K. Smith 43'	Report	Try: Matthews 4'; Braude 34'; Kubheka 56'; Van Wyk 73'; Con: Swiel (3/3) 5', 35', 57'; Giliomee (1/1) 74'	Referee: Dylen November

1 August 2026	Lions (1 BP)	42–19	Bulls XV	UJ Stadium, Johannesburg
17:05 SAST	Try: Delport 9'; Van Vuuren 17'; Venter 29'; Sithole 34'; Sjoblom 41'; Moos 70'; Con: Francis (5/5) 10', 18', 30', 35', 42'; Coetzee (1/1) 72'; Cards: Cairns (yellow card) 38'; Delport (red card) 70'	Report	Try: Maake 52'; Williams 65'; Bam 74'; Con: Johannes (2/3) 53', 66'; Cards: Manjezi (yellow card) 33'	Referee: Juan de Bod

2 August 2026	Boland Cavaliers (1 BP)	15–20	Pumas	Boland Stadium, Wellington
15:00 SAST	Try: Mitchell 26'; Van der Westhuizen 51'; Con: Tedder (1/2) 52'; Pen: Bantom 78'; Cards: Dimaza (yellow card) 15'; Tedder (yellow card) 36'	Report	Try: Bursey 30'; Fleurs 42'; Con: Fleurs (2/2) 30', 43'; Pen: Fleurs (2) 7', 70'; Cards: Scheepers (yellow card) 59'	Referee: Morné Ferreira

=== Round 4 ===
8 August 2026	Griquas (1 BP)	31–19	Lions	Griqua Park, Kimberley
13:00 SAST	Try: Wehr 9'; Maart 12'; Venter 55'; Alexander 60'; Con: Whitehead (1/4) 61'; Pen: Whitehead (3) 29', 43', 77'; Cards: Bester (yellow card) 64'	Report	Try: Biyela 36'; Cairns 65'; Kevani 80+1'; Con: Francis (2/3) 37', 65'	Referee: Stephan Geldenhuys

8 August 2026	Bulls XV (2 BP)	31–33	Pumas (1 BP)	Loftus Versfeld Stadium, Pretoria
15:05 SAST	Try: Penalty try 23'; Eloff 40+4'; Mnebelele 47'; Msengana 70'; Kunene 78'; Con: Johannes (2/4) 40+5', 48'; Cards: Nonkontwana (red card) 11'; Mnebelele (yellow card) 31'; Van Biljon (yellow card) 34'; Manjezi (yellow card) 74'	Report	Try: Isaacs 5'; Engelbrecht 14'; Scheepers 20'; Campher (2) 55', 75'; Con: Fleurs (4/5) 6', 15', 56', 76'; Cards: Isaacs (yellow card) 22'; Fisanti (yellow card) 49'	Referee: Dylen November

8 August 2026	Sharks XV	19–12	Boland Cavaliers (1 BP)	Princess Magogo Stadium, KwaMashu
17:15 SAST	Try: Rasivhaga (2) 19', 69'; Slabbert 34'; Con: Swiel (2/3) 19', 35'; Cards: Van Vuuren (yellow card) 75'	Report	Try: Bantom 5'; Maritz 76'; Con: Davids (1/1) 76'; Cards: Nxele (yellow card) 21'; Tedder (yellow card) 60'	Referee: Christopher Allison

9 August 2026	Stormers XXIII (2 BP)	26–31	Cheetahs (1 BP)	Athlone Stadium, Cape Town
15:00 SAST	Try: Ungerer 11'; Paulo 39'; Mlaba (2) 57', 76'; Con: Du Plessis (3/4) 12', 40', 58'; Cards: Mlaba (yellow card) 60'; Nyali (yellow card) 69'	Report	Try: Nkabinde 13'; Volschenk 44'; Annies 61'; Penalty try 69'; De Klerk 80'; Con: Du Plessis (2/2) 45', 62'; Cards: Miller (yellow card) 32'	Referee: Hanru van Rooyen

=== Round 5 ===
14 August 2026	Lions (1 BP)	29–38	Boland Cavaliers (1 BP)	Bidvest Stadium, Johannesburg
15:00 SAST	Try: Smith (2) 10', 67'; Cairns 14'; Jonker 73'; Con: Francis (3/4) 11', 14', 73'; Pen: Francis 8'; Cards: Sithole (yellow card) 36'	Report	Try: Gumede (2) 18', 70'; Dlamini 36'; Sangweni 47'; Leonard 65'; Con: Davids (3/3) 19', 37', 48'; Tedder (2/2) 66', 71'; Pen: Tedder 80'; Cards: Nxele (yellow card) 6'; Gumede (yellow card) 23'	Referee: Hanru van Rooyen

14 August 2026	Griquas (1 BP)	55–21	Sharks XV	Griqua Park, Kimberley
17:05 SAST	Try: Venter 8'; Penalty try 14'; Maart (3) 21', 45', 80'; Alexander 40'; Lange (3) 66', 70', 77'; Con: Whitehead (2/4) 9', 40+1'; Koen (2/4) 66', 80+1'	Report	Try: Mavesere 17'; Swiel 26'; Momsen 37'; Con: Giliomee (1/1) 18'; Swiel (2/2) 27', 38'; Cards: Swiel (yellow card) 14'; Mavesere (yellow card) 73'	Referee: Griffin Colby

15 August 2026	Pumas (1 BP)	29–7	Stormers XXIII	Mbombela Stadium, Mbombela
17:00 SAST	Try: Bursey 33'; Britz 40'; Campher 58'; Scheepers 61'; Con: Fleurs (3/4) 34', 59', 62'; Pen: Fleurs 10'	Report	Try: Ndhlovu 51'; Con: Smith (1/1) 52'	Referee: Christopher Allison

16 August 2026	Bulls XV (1 BP)	52–62	Cheetahs (1 BP)	Loftus Versfeld Stadium, Pretoria
15:00 SAST	Try: Bam 8'; Mnebelele 20'; Maake 27'; Rademeyer (2) 56', 79'; Newman 62'; Carr 74'; Williams 77'; Con: Johannes (5/7) 21', 57', 75', 78', 80'; Newman (1/1) 62'	Report	Try: Annies (2) 3', 24'; Du Plessis 14'; Nkabinde (2) 17', 31'; Volschenk 35'; Jasper (2) 40', 48'; Sekekete 53'; Con: Van der Walt (7/9) 4', 15', 18', 24', 36', 40+1', 48'; Pen: Ja. Nel 80+3'; Cards: Janse van Rensburg (red card) 67'; Annies (yellow card) 73'	Referee: Jonathan Lottering

=== Round 6 ===
21 August 2026	Pumas	14–38	Griquas (1 BP)	Mbombela Stadium, Mbombela
15:00 SAST	Try: Swart 37'; Banda 58'; Con: Swart (2/2) 38', 59'; Cards: Van der Merwe (yellow card) 11'; Campher (red card) 71'	Report	Try: Bester (2) 5', 77'; Lange 12'; Oosthuizen 34'; Wehr 45'; Con: Whitehead (4/4) 6', 13', 34', 46'; Koen (1/1) 78'; Pen: Whitehead 40+1'; Cards: Maart (yellow card) 50'	Referee: Stephan Geldenhuys

21 August 2026	Bulls XV (1 BP)	26–50	Stormers XXIII (1 BP)	Loftus Versfeld Stadium, Pretoria
17:05 SAST	Try: Mnebelele 31'; D. Erasmus 53'; Hobson 59'; Maake 69'; Con: Johannes (3/4) 32', 60', 69'; Cards: Nonkontwana (yellow card) 41'	Report	Try: Muller 17'; Smith 23'; Lubbe 27'; Leotlela (2) 36', 47'; Paulo 40+1'; Basson 75'; Con: Smith (6/7) 18', 23', 37', 40+2', 48', 76'; Pen: Smith 65'; Cards: Smit (yellow card) 68'	Referee: Hanru van Rooyen

21 August 2026	Sharks XV (1 BP)	22–22	Lions	Woodburn Stadium, Pietermaritzburg
19:05 SAST	Try: Braude 31'; Van Wyk 43'; Grobbelaar 48'; Barnard 77'; Con: Swiel (1/3) 44'; Cards: Rasivhaga (yellow card) 3'	Report	Try: Gwiji 37'; Combrinck 54'; Mentoe 80+3'; Con: Francis (2/3) 38', 55'; Pen: Francis 15'	Referee: Juan de Bod

23 August 2026	Cheetahs (1 BP)	33–24	Boland Cavaliers	Free State Stadium, Bloemfontein
15:00 SAST	Try: Smal 22'; Du Plessis 44'; De Klerk 61'; Annies (2) 65', 71'; Con: Swanepoel (4/5) 23', 45', 61', 72'; Cards: Nkabinde (yellow card) 73'	Report	Try: Stopforth 28'; Eras 69'; Geldenhuys 78'; Con: Davids (3/3) 29', 70', 78'; Pen: Davids 40+1'; Cards: Dimaza (yellow card) 57'; C. Smit (yellow card) 60'; Stopforth (yellow card) 61'; Dlamini (yellow card) 66'	Referee: Morné Ferreira

=== Round 7 ===
28 August 2026	Lions (1 BP)	36–12	Stormers XXIII	Ellis Park, Johannesburg
17:05 SAST	Try: Mentoe 10'; Cairns 38'; Adams 54'; Du Plessis 60'; Nela 76'; Con: Coetzee (4/5) 11', 55', 61', 77'; Pen: Coetzee 2'	Report	Try: Muller 64'; Rabe 80+5'; Con: Smith (1/2) 80+6'; Cards: Malgas (yellow card) 70'	Referee: Christopher Allison

28 August 2026	Sharks XV (1 BP)	53–22	Bulls XV (1 BP)	Kings Park Stadium, Durban
19:15 SAST	Try: Mavesere (4) 5', 12', 32', 66'; Braude (2) 26', 38'; Swiel 29'; Marais (2) 72', 78'; Con: Giliomee (4/9) 13', 30', 39', 67'	Report	Try: Maake 24'; Rademeyer 46'; Newman 61'; Pongolo 69'; Con: I. van der Merwe (1/1) 25'	Referee: Morné Ferreira

29 August 2026	Pumas (1 BP)	52–26	Cheetahs (1 BP)	Mbombela Stadium, Mbombela
14:00 SAST	Try: Xamlashe 5'; Van Zyl (2) 13', 38'; Goedhals 27'; Scheepers (2) 46', 58'; De Klerk 53'; Fisanti 74'; Con: Swart (6/8) 6', 13', 27', 39', 54', 75'; Cards: Adonis (yellow card) 19' (yellow-red card) 64'	Report	Try: C. Coetzee 24'; S. Venter 44'; Maartens 66'; Annies 71'; Con: Swanepoel (2/2) 25', 45'; De Klerk (1/2) 66'	Referee: Hanru van Rooyen

30 August 2026	Boland Cavaliers	17–48	Griquas (1 BP)	Boland Stadium, Wellington
15:00 SAST	Try: Sangweni 29'; Bantom 38'; Con: Davids (2/2) 30', 38'; Pen: Davids 3'; Cards: Eras (yellow card) 15'; Lewis (yellow card) 55'; Nxele (red card) 71'	Report	Try: De Witt 8'; Maart 15'; Lange 40+1'; Els 46'; Coetzee 51'; Oosthuizen 57'; Wehr 74'; Con: Koen (5/6) 9', 40+2', 47', 52', 58'; Pen: Whitehead 80+2'; Cards: Lyons (yellow card) 21'	Referee: Griffin Colby

=== Semi Finals ===
6 September 2026	Griquas	52–12	Lions	Griqua Park, Kimberley
13:00 SAST	Try: Oosthuizen (2) 4', 45'; De Witt 11'; Zwelendaba 29'; Coetzee 32'; Lange 40'; Hart 71'; Con: Whitehead (5/5) 5', 12', 30', 33', 40+1'; Koen (2/2) 46', 72'; Pen: Koen 79'	Report	Try: Combrinck 17'; Adams 64'; Con: Coetzee (1/2) 64'; Cards: Pead (yellow card) 49'	Referee: Griffin Colby

6 September 2026	Cheetahs	24–27	Pumas	Free State Stadium, Bloemfontein
15:30 SAST	Try: P. Uys 34'; Janse van Rensburg 56'; C. Coetzee 67'; Con: Van der Walt (3/3) 36', 57', 68'; Pen: Van der Walt 19'	Report	Try: Adonis 43'; Goedhals 52'; Du Rand 62'; Con: Swart (3/3) 44', 53', 63'; Pen: Swart (2) 40', 70'	Referee: Christopher Allison

=== Final ===
12 September 2026	Griquas	23–16	Pumas	Griqua Park, Kimberley
15:00 SAST	Try: Zwelendaba 20'; Uys 73'; Con: Whitehead (2/2) 21', 74'; Pen: Whitehead (3) 8', 57', 69'	Report	Try: Adonis 13'; Con: Swart (1/1) 14'; Pen: Swart (3) 25', 33', 71'	Referee: Morné Ferreira

Griquas	Pumas

Griquas:
FB	15	Stefan Coetzee
RW	14	Dylan Maart
OC	13	Zane Bester	(substituted off) 33'	(substituted on) 40'
IC	12	Mnombo Zwelendaba
LW	11	Sako Makata			(substituted off) 73'
FH	10	George Whitehead	(substituted off) 75'
SH	9	Bobby Alexander	(substituted off) 75'
N8	8	Carl Els
BF	7	Marco de Witt
OF	6	Lourens Oosthuizen	(substituted off) 40'
RL	5	Albert Liebenberg (c)
LL	4	Malembe Mpofu	(substituted off) 40'
TP	3	Ig Prinsloo	(substituted off) 47'
HK	2	Tiaan Lange	(substituted off) 71'
LP	1	Leon Lyons	(substituted off) 47'
Substitutes:
HK	16	Janco Uys	(substituted on) 71'
PR	17	Eddie Davids	(substituted on) 47'
PR	18	Ntobeko Shezi	(substituted on) 47'
LK	19	Derik Pretorius	(substituted on) 40'
BR	20	Carel van der Merwe	(substituted on) 40'
SH	21	Jack Hart	(substituted on) 75'
FH	22	Liam Koen	(substituted on) 75'
FB	23	Connor Mahoney	(substituted on) 33'	(substituted off) 40'	(substituted on) 73'
Coach:
Pieter Bergh

Pumas:
FB	15	Jay-Cee Nel	(substituted off) 76'
RW	14	Darren Adonis	(substituted off) 44'
OC	13	Sango Xamlashe
IC	12	Wian van Niekerk
LW	11	Banie Britz
FH	10	Clinton Swart
SH	9	Thomas Bursey
N8	8	Willie Engelbrecht (c)
BF	7	Andre Goedhals	(substituted off) 46'
OF	6	Ntsika Fisanti	(substituted off) 73'
RL	5	Tiaan de Klerk	(substituted off) 66'
LL	4	JJ Scheepers
TP	3	Sampie Swiegers	(substituted off) 63'
HK	2	Chyle van Zyl	(substituted off) 50'
LP	1	Etienne Janeke	(substituted off) 51'	(substituted on) 63'
Substitutes:
HK	16	Gustav du Rand	(substituted on) 50'
PR	17	Zukisa Sali	(substituted on) 51'	(substituted off) 63'
PR	18	Junior Banda	(substituted on) 63'
LK	19	Stephan Krugel	(substituted on) 66'
BR	20	Ruwald van der Merwe	(substituted on) 46'
BR	21	Thabo Ndimande	(substituted on) 73'
FB	22	Tino Swanepoel	(substituted on) 44'
SH	23	Ruswill Fredericks	(substituted on) 76'
Coach:
Jimmy Stonehouse

Assistant Referees:
Stephan Geldenhuys
Jonathan Lottering
Television match official:
Marius van der Westhuizen

== See also ==
- 2026 Currie Cup First Division
- 2026 SA Cup
