= 2026 SA Cup =

Third edition of South African rugby union competition

- Date: 6 March – 23 May 2026
- Champions: Pumas (2)
- Runners-up: Griquas
- Top point scorer: George Whitehead (83)
- Top try scorer: Connor Mahoney (14)

The 2026 SA Cup is the third edition of the annual domestic rugby union cup competition, the SA Cup. It is played between provincial teams in South Africa and the competition serves as qualification to the Currie Cup Premier Division and Currie Cup First Division respectively.

The Pumas are the current defending champions.

== Competition ==
The same 10 teams are competing in the 2026 SA Cup. The top four teams qualify to join the four United Rugby Championship teams in the 2026 Currie Cup Premier Division and the remaining six teams will battle it out for the 2026 Currie Cup First Division title.

== Teams ==
Location of teams in 2026 SA Cup

2026 SA Cup
Team	Sponsored name
Border Bulldogs	—N/a
Boland Cavaliers	Sanlam Boland Kavaliers
Cheetahs	Toyota Cheetahs
Eastern Province Elephants	—N/a
Griquas	Suzuki Griquas
Griffons	—N/a
Leopards	—N/a
SWD Eagles	Dotsure SWD Eagles
Pumas	Airlink Pumas
Valke	—N/a

== Standings ==
2026 SA Cup standings
Pos	Team	Pld	W	D	L	PF	PA	PD	TF	TA	B	Pts	Qualification
1	Griquas	9	8	0	1	534	137	+397	82	18	10	42	SA Cup grand final and 2026 Currie Cup Premier Division
2	Pumas	9	7	1	1	429	164	+265	63	24	8	38	SA Cup grand final and 2026 Currie Cup Premier Division
3	Cheetahs	9	6	1	2	378	166	+212	58	24	9	35	2026 Currie Cup Premier Division
4	Boland Cavaliers	9	6	0	3	424	212	+212	63	30	8	32	2026 Currie Cup Premier Division
5	SWD Eagles	9	6	0	3	328	267	+61	51	39	8	32	
6	Valke	9	5	0	4	336	344	−8	49	51	9	29	
7	Eastern Province	9	3	0	6	257	364	−107	35	55	6	18	
8	Griffons	9	2	0	7	205	429	−224	30	64	5	13	
9	Leopards	9	1	0	8	157	469	−312	24	73	5	9	
10	Border Bulldogs	9	0	0	9	101	597	−496	16	93	0	0	

Source: SARU
- Green background (rows 1 to 2) indicates qualification places for the SA Cup grand final and 2026 Currie Cup Premier Division.
- Blue background (rows 3 to 4) indicates other teams qualified for the 2026 Currie Cup Premier Division.
- Plain background (row 5–10) indicates other teams qualified for the 2026 Currie Cup First Division.

== Fixtures and results ==
=== Regular season ===
==== Round one ====
6 March 2026	Eastern Province	23–29	Valke	Nelson Mandela Bay Stadium, Gqeberha
17:00	Try: Sachin Toring; Laken Gray; Con: Garth April (2); Pen: Garth April (2); Maxwell Klaasen	Report	Try: Ezrick Alexander; Pierre Rabie; Musa Tshabalala; Adrian Joubert; Con: Sergio Stalmeester (2); Mbembe Payi; Pen: Payi	Referee: Dylen November

6 March 2026	SWD Eagles	26–28	Pumas	Outeniqua Park, George
18:00	Try: Keanu Vers; Ulrich Stander; Carel du Preez; Penalty Try; Con: Fred Zeilinga; Abner van Reenen	Report	Try: Sango Xamlashe; Valentino Wellman; Dalvon Blood; Ntsika Fisanti; Con: Danrich Visagie (4)	Referee: Marius van der Westhuizen

6 March 2026	Free State Cheetahs	24–34	Boland Cavaliers	Free State Stadium, Bloemfontein
18:00	Try: Prince Nkabinde; Alex-Zander du Plessis; Louis van der Westhuizen; Christiaan van der Westhuizen; Con: Cohen Jasper; Ethan Wentzel	Report	Try: Juan Mostert; Lunathi Nxele; Xavier Mitchell; Thurlow Marsh; Con: Juan Mostert (4); Pen: Mostert (2)	Referee: Marius van der Westhuizen

7 March 2026	Griquas	101–7	Leopards	Griqua Park, Kimberley
15:00	Try: Lourens Oosthuizen (3); Sako Makata (3); Cameron Hufke (2); Connor Mahoney (2); Albert Liebenberg; Tiaan Lange; Damian Markus; Phumzile Maqondwana; Gustav Erlank; Con: Louis Koen (9); George Whitehead (4)	Report	Try: Naiden Jaarts; Con: Shaun Baxter	Referee: Aimee Barrett-Theron

7 March 2026	Griffons	36–17	Border Bulldogs	North West Stadium, Welkom
15:00	Try: Calla Pienaar; Hlumza Nondonga; Chad Tshimanga (3); Justin Forwood; Con: Keegan Schaefer (3)	Report	Try: Siyabonga Marele; Mbasa Nkonki; Sphamandia Soti; Con: Avuyile Mabece	Referee: Griffin Colby

==== Round two ====
13 March 2026	Leopards	7–64	Free State Cheetahs	Olën Park, Potchefstroom
18:30	Try: Hlumelo Ndudula; Con: Jandré Burger	Report	Try: Marko Janse van Rensburg (2); Jandré Nel; George Lourens; Cohen Jasper; Clayton Blommetjies; Victor Sekekete; Marco Jansen van Vuren; Tielman Nieuwoudt; Penalty Try; Con: Cohen Jasper (4); Ntokozo Makhaza (2)	Referee: Aimee Barrett-Theron

13 March 2026	Pumas	47–10	Eastern Province	Mbombela Stadium, Nelspruit
19:00	Try: Ntsika Fisanti (3); Andrew Kota; Sango Xamlashe; Valentino Wellman; Darnell Osuagwu; Con: Clinton Swart (4); Danrich Visagie (2)	Report	Try: Lwandile Mapuko; Con: Lwandile Mapuko; Pen: Garth April	Referee: Stephan Geldenhuys

14 March 2026	Valke	15–52	Griquas	Barnard Stadium, Kempton Park
15:00	Try: Mbembe Payi; Zander van der Merwe; Con: Tylor Sefoor; Pen: Tylor Sefoor	Report	Try: Connor Mahoney (3); Cameron Hufke; Tiaan Lange; Mnombo Zwelendaba; Marco de Witt; Lourens Reinart Oosthuizen; Con: Liam Koen (4); George Whitehead (2)	Referee: Hanru van Rooyen

14 March 2026	Border Bulldogs	22–57	SWD Eagles	Sisa Dukashe Stadium, Mdantsane
15:30	Try: Sibusiso Lali; Hlumelo Zitha; Hlumelo Pantyo; Con: Isiphe Mbini (2); Pen: Isiphe Mbini	Report	Try: Tiaan Pretorius (2); Gideon van Wyk (2); Janus Venter; Gunther Janse van Vuuren; Kyle Cyster; Matthew Sekele; Penalty Try; Con: Fred Zeilinga (5)	Referee: Paul Mentre

15 March 2026	Boland Cavaliers	56–23	Griffons	Boland Stadium, Wellington
16:00	Try: Xavier Mitchell (4); Sidney Tobias (2); Khwezi Mafu; Chris Smit; Con: Juan Mostert (7); Thurlon Williams	Report	Try: Chyle van Zyl; Penalty Try; Con: Dehovine Johannes; Pen: Keegan Schaefer (3)	Referee: Sean Muller

==== Round three ====
20 March 2026	Cheetahs	Match abandoned (Note: Match abandoned in first half because of lightning)	Pumas	Free State Stadium, Bloemfontein
18:00		Report		Referee: Christopher Allison

21 March 2026	Boland Cavaliers	73–24	Valke	Boland Stadium, Wellington
15:00	Try: Erik Lambrecht (2); Xavier Mitchell (2); Jade Stighling; Domenic Smit; Dayan van der Westhuizen; Sauliegh Arendse; Joshua Eras; Michael Benadie; Thurlow Marsh; Con: Juan Mostert (7); Thurlon Williams (2)	Report	Try: Zeilinga Strydom (2); Kelvin Kanenungo; Con: Sergio Stalmeester (3); Pen: Sergio Stalmeester	Referee: Dylen November

21 March 2026	Griffons	29 –23	Leopards	North West Stadium; Welkom
15:00	Try: Simon Westraadt; Sibongile Novuka; Clive Kruger; Dehovine Johannes; Sergio Moreira; Con: Dehovine Johannes (2)	Report	Try: Zachery Bester (2); Noegh Hayward; Con: Jandre Burger; Pen: Jandre Burger (2)	Referee: Paul Mente

21 March 2026	Griquas	97–7	Border Bulldogs	Griqua Park, Kimberley
15:00	Try: Marco de Witt (2); Dylan Maart (2); Connor Mahoney (2); Thomas Nel (2); Carl Els (2); Mnombo Zwelendaba; Lungi Mbiko; Gurshwin Wehr; Bobby Alexander; Sako Makata; Con: Zinedine Robinson (7); George Whitehead (3) Bobby Alexander	Report	Try: Sakhekile Dingile; Con: Isiphe Mbini	Referee: Lulutho Matomela

21 March 2026	Eastern Province	22–26	SWD Eagles	Nelson Mandela Bay Stadium, Gqeberha
17:00	Try: Lwandile Mapuko (2); Joshua Paris; Con: Maxwell Klaasen (2); Pen: Maxwell Klaasen	Report	Try: Kyle Cyster; Tiaan Pretorius; Gunther Janse van Vuuren; Carlton Banies; Con: Fred Zeilinga (3)	Referee: AJ Jacobs

==== Round four ====
28 March 2026	SWD Eagles	33–24	Boland Cavaliers	Outeniqua Park, George
15:00	Try: Ulrich Stander (3), Tiaan Fourie, Dylan De Leeuw; Con: Fred Zeilinga (4)	Roport	Try: Xavier Mitchell (2), Thurlow Marsh; Con: Juan Mostert (3); Pen: Juan Mostert	Referee: Christopher Allsion

28 March 2026	Leopards	31–14	Border Bulldogs	Olën Park, Potchefstroom
15:00	Try: Siniothando Tshontsyi (3), Jason Alexander (2); Con: Jandre Burger (3)	Report	Try: Luvumo Makata, Dillan Kromhout; Con: Mbasa Nkonki (2)	Referee: Marius van der Westhuizen

28 March 2026	Free State Cheetahs	52–19	Eastern Province	Free State Stadium, Bloemfontein
15:00	Try: Cohen Jasper (3), Carl Wegner (2), Neels Volschenk, Munier Hartzenberg, Michael Annies; Con: Jaco van der Walt (6)	Report	Try: Mpho Ntsane (2), Jaydon Bantom; Con: Maxwell Klaasen (2)	Referee: Paul Mente

28 March 2026	Griquas	71–7	Griffons	Griqua Park, Kimberley
15:00	Try: Dylan Maart (3), Connor Mahoney (3), Tiaan Lange, Gurshwin Wehr, Zane Bester, Sako Makata, Caleb Abrahams; Con: George Whitehead (5), Cameron Hufke (3)	Report	Try: Sergio Moreira; Con: Keegan Schaefer	Referee: AJ Jacobs

29 March 2026	Pumas	42–36	Valke	Mbombela Stadium, Nelspruit
15:00	Try: Ntsika Fisanti (3), Gustav du Rand, Jay Cee Nel, Sango Xamlashe; Con: Clinton Swart (6)	Report	Try: Mosolwa Mafuma, Godfrey Muzanargwo, Luciano Elias, Marco Fuhri, Penalty try Con: Sergio Stalmeester (3); Pen: Sergio Stalmeester	Referee: Stephan Geldenhuys

==== Round five ====
11 April 2026	Boland Cavaliers	14–24	Griquas	Boland Stadium, Wellington
15:00	Try: Doctor Booysen; James Tedder; Con: James Tedder (2)	Report	Try: Gurswin Wehr; Tiaan Lange; Dylan Maart; Connor Mahoney; Con: George Whitehead (2)	Referee: Griffin Colby

11 April 2026	Griffons	10–57	Cheetahs	North West Stadium, Welkom
15:00	Try: Jandre de Beer; Con: Dehovine Johannes; Pen: Keegan Schaefer	Report	Try: Cohen Jasper (2); Tielman Nieuwoudt (2); Michael Annies (2); Daniel Maartens; Marco Janse van Rensburg; Penalty Try; Con: Jaco van der Walt (4); Clayton Blommetjies	Referee: Dylen November

11 April 2026	Leopards	31–43	Eastern Province	Olën Park, Potchefstroom
15:00	Try: Naiden Jaarts (2); Daimon O’Connell; Ghudian van Reenen; Brandon Keevy; Con: Naiden Jaarts (3)	Report	Try: Mpho Ntsane (3); Dandre Delport; Damon Royle; Garth April; Hlomla Zondani; Con: Garth April (3); Maxwell Klaasen	Referee: Christopher Allison

11 April 2026	Valke	40–43	SWD Eagles	Barnard Stadium, Kempton Park
15:00	Try: Mbembe Payi (2); Musa Tshabalala (2); Sergio Stalmeester; Theuns Pretorius; Con: Sergio Stalmeester (5)	Report	Try: Kyle Cyster; Gunther Janse van Vuuren; Nico Leonard; Niel Beukes; Rosco Syster; Fred Zeilinga; Con: Abner van Reenen (4); Fred Zeilinga; Pen: Fred Zeilinga	Referee: Hanru van Rooyen

11 April 2026	Border Bulldogs	5–94	Pumas	Sisa Dukashe Stadium, Mdantsane
15:30	Try: Mihlali Nchukana	Report	Try: JC Nel (4); Andrew Kota (2); JJ Scheepers (2); Tino Swanepoel (2); Sango Xamlashe; De Wet Marais; Etienne Janeke; Dalvon Blood; Con: Clinton Swart (6); Nevaldo Fleurs (6)	Referee: Paul Mente

==== Round six ====
17 April 2026	Pumas	85–0	Leopards	Mbombela Stadium, Nelspruit
19:00	Try: Dalvon Blood (3); Gustav du Rand (2); Willie Engelbrecht (2); Jay-Cee Nel; Andre Fouché; Wian van Niekerk; Ruwald van der Merwe; Msenge; Campher; Con: Nevaldo Fleurs (9); Jay-Cee Nel	Report		Referee: Juan de Bod

18 April 2026	Boland Cavaliers	74–5	Border Bulldogs	Boland Stadium, Wellington
15:00	Try: Xavier Mitchell (4); Joshua Eras (2); Jayden Bantom (2); Sibusiso Sangweni; Bentley Geldenhuys; Jurick Lewis; Sidney Tobias; Con: James Tedder (7)	Report	Try: Lonwabo Rawana	Referee: Hernus Coetzee

18 April 2026	SWD Eagles	17–26	Cheetahs	Outeniqua Park, George
15:00	Try: Ulrich Stander (2); Kyle Cyster; Con: Fred Zeilinga	Report	Try: Marko Janse van Rensburg; Juan Smal (2); Marco Janse van Vuren; Con: Jaco van der Walt (3)	Referee: Marius van der Westhuizen

17 April 2026	Griffons	36–68	Valke	North West Stadium, Welkom
15:00	Try: Chris Hollis; Dehovine Johannes; Mingo Piti; Ngia Selengbe; Chad Tshimanga; Cassie Botes; Con: Keegan Schaefer (2); Dehovine Johannes	Report	Try: Zeilinga Strydom (2); Wernich Aucamp; Ezrick Alexander; Zander van der Merwe; Sergio Stalmeester; Tiaan Jonker; Musa Tshabalala; Theuns Pretorius; Marco Fuhri; Con: Sergio Stalmeester (6); Mbembe Payi (2); Tylor Sefoor	Referee: Stephan Geldenhuys

17 April 2026	Eastern Province	9–52	Griquas	Nelson Mandela Bay Stadium, Gqeberha
17:00	Pen: Maxwell Klaasen (3)	Report	Try: Cameron Hufke (2); Dylan Maart; Sako Makata; Keagan Blanckenberg; Carel van der Merwe; Gurshwin Wehr; Penalty Try; Con: George Whitehead (3); Liam Koen (2)	Referee: Lulutho Matomela

==== Round seven ====
24 April 2026	Eastern Province	71–14	Border Bulldogs	Nelson Mandela Bay Stadium, Gqeberha
17:00	Try: Kamvelihle Fatyela (3); Mpho Ntsane (3); Troy Delport (2); Richman Gora; Willem van der Walt; Jaydon Bantom; Con: Garth April (5); Maxwell Klaasen (3)	Report	Try: Simthembile Zozi (2); Con: Isiphe Mbini; Lukhangele Tshayi	Referee: Sean Muller

24 April 2026	Leopards	12–33	Boland Cavaliers	Olën Park, Potchefstroom
18:30	Try: Naiden Jaarts; Ghudian van Reenen; Con: Jandre Burger	Report	Try: Jade Stighling; Jayden Bantom; Domenic Smit; Dewald Maritz; Duren Hoffman; Con: James Tedder (2); Bantom (2)	Referee: Hanru van Rooyen

25 April 2026	Valke	43–36	Cheetahs	Barnard Stadium, Kempton Park
15:00	Try: Sergio Stalmeester (2); Godfrey Muzanargwo; Mosolwa Mafuma; Kayden Kiewit; Dirk Lourens; Con: Stalmeester (4); Tylor Sefoor; Pen: Sefoor	Report	Try: Ethan Wentzel (2); Louis van der Westhuizen; Marco Janse van Vuren; Michael Annies; Juan Venter; Con: Jaco van der Walt (3)	Referee: Paul Mente

25 April 2026	SWD Eagles	45–24	Griffons	Outeniqua Park, George
15:00	Try: Rosco Syster (2); Nico Leonard; Dylan de Leeuw; Jaco Bezuidenhout; Janus Venter; Matthew Sekele; Con: Fred Zeilinga (5)	Report	Try: Simon Westraadt (2); Larren Buys; Con: Dehovine Johannes (3); Pen: Johannes	Referee: Stephan Geldenhuys

26 April 2026	Griquas	44–34	Pumas	Griqua Park, Kimberley
15:00	Try: Tiaan Lange; Dylan Maart; Albert Liebenberg; Carel van der Merwe; Caleb Abrahams; Janco Uys; Con: Whitehead (4); Pen: Whitehead (2)	Report	Try: Jay Cee Nel (2); Thomas Bursey; Tiaan de Klerk; Sango Xamlash; Con: Nevaldo Fleurs (2); Clinton Swart; Pen: Swart	Referee: AJ Jacobs

==== Round eight ====
2 May 2026	Griquas	62–12	SWD Eagles	Griqua Park, Kimberley
15:00	Try: Cameron Hufke (2); Connor Mahoney (2); Janco Uys; Malembe Mpofu; Mango Ngundue; Sako Makata; Damian Markus; Dylan Maart; Con: George Whitehead (4); Liam Koen (2)	Report	Try: Masande Mtshali; Xavier Swartbooi; Con: Fred Zeilinga	Referee: Griffin Colby

2 May 2026	Valke	31–27	Leopards	Barnard Stadium, Kempton Park
15:00	Try: Mbembe Payi (2); Zeilinga Strydom; Tiaan Jonker; Pierre Rabie; Con: Sergio Stalmeester (2); Tylor Sefoor	Report	Try: Naiden Jaarts; Brandon Keevy; Godfrey Sebokolodi; Siniothando Tshontsyi; Con: Jandre Burger (2); Pen: Burger	Referee: AJ Jacobs

2 May 2026	Griffons	28–31	Eastern Province	North West Stadium, Welkom
15:00	Try: Jandre de Beer (2); Daylon Myners; Chad Tshimanga; Con: Dehovine Johannes (3); Myners	Report	Try: Lwandile Mapuko (2); Diego Williams; Penalty Try; Con: Garth April (3); Pen: April	Referee: Marius van der Westhuizen

2 May 2026	Border Bulldogs	5–87	Cheetahs	Sisa Dukashe Stadium, Mdantsane
15:30	Con: Mbasa Nkonki	Report	Try: Michael Annies (4); Rewan Kruger (2); Louis van der Westhuizen (2); Ramon Uys; Tielman Nieuwoudt; Juan Smal; Sisonke Vumazonke; Cohen Jasper; Con: Jasper (10); Annies	Referee: Hanru van Rooyen

3 May 2026	Pumas	38–31	Boland Cavaliers	Mbombela Stadium, Nelspruit
15:00	Try: Gustav du Rand (2); Ruwald van der Merwe; Lundi Msenge; Clinton Swart; Con: Swart (5); Pen: Swart	Report	Try: Sidney Tobias; Louis Schreuder; Jayden Bantom; Dayan van der Westhuizen; Sauliegh Arendse; Con: Bantom (3)	Referee: Stephan Geldenhuys

==== Round nine ====
8 May 2026	Cheetahs	32–31	Griquas	Free State Stadium, Bloemfontein
18:00	Try: Rewan Kruger; Cohen Jasper; Munier Hartzenberg; Louis van der Westhuizen; Con: Jaco van der Walt (2); Cohen Jasper; Pen: Van der Walt (2)	Report	Try: Dylan Maart; Damian Markus; Tiaan Lange; Connor Mahoney; Carel van der Merwe; Con: George Whitehead (3)	Referee: Morne Ferreira

8 May 2026	Pumas	61–12	Griffons	Mbombela Stadium, Nelspruit
19:00	Try: Tino Swanepoel (3); Sango Xamlashe (2); Jay‑Cee Nel; De Wet Marais; Conor van Eeden; Clinton Swart; Con: Clinton Swart (5); Danrich Visagie (3)	Report	Try: Armand Maritz; Penalty try	Referee: Paul Mente

9 May 2026	Boland Cavaliers	85–29	Eastern Province	Boland Stadium, Wellington
15:00	Try: Xavier Michell (7); Chris Smit (2); Jurick Lewis; Lunathi Nxele; Duren Hoffman; Kwanda Dimaza; Con: Jayden Bantom (5); Thurlon Williams (5)	Report	Try: Mpho Ntsane (2); Lwandile Mapuko; Jac van der Walt; Con: Garth April (3); Pen: Garth April	Referee: AJ Jacobs

9 May 2026	SWD Eagles	69–19	Leopards	Outeniqua Park, George
15:00	Try: Ulrich Wahl (3); Jaco Bezuidenhout; Hendrik Stemmet; Rosco Syster; Tiaan Fourie; Janus Venter; Tiaan Drotskie; Kyle Cyster; Nico Leonard; Con: Fred Zeilinga (5); Abner van Reenen; Ulrich Wahl	Report	Try: Siniothando Tshontsyi (2); Ghudian van Reenen; Con: Jandre Burger (2)	Referee: Juan de Bod

9 May 2026	Border Bulldogs	12–50	Valke	Sisa Dukashe Stadium; Mdantsane
15:30	Try: Sokhana Mpemba; Lonwabo Rawana; Con: Isiphe Mbini	Report	Try: Abulele Ndabambi (4); Sergio Stalmeester; Mbembe Payi; Mosolwa Mafuma; Dirk Lourens; Con: Sergio Stalmeester (5)	Referee: Caleb Hibbert

=== Semi Finals ===
15 May 2026	Pumas	42–36	Cheetahs	Mbombela Stadium, Nelspruit
18:00	Try: Sampie Swiegers (2); Gustav du Rand (2); Junior Banda; Con: Clinton Swart (4); Pen: Swart (3)	Report	Try: Clayton Blommetjies; Michael Annies; Cohen Jasper; Neels Volschenk; Sisonke Vumazonke; Con: Jasper (3); Tiaan Swanepoel; Pen: Swanepoel	Referee: Stephan Geldenhuys

16 May 2026	Griquas	59–35	Boland Cavaliers	Griqua Park, Kimberley
13:00	Try: Dylan Maart (2); Cameron Hufke; Penalty try Bobby Alexander; Marco de Witt; Sako Makata; Lourens Oosthuizen; Zane Bester; Con: George Whitehead (7); Pen: Hufke	Report	Try: James Tedder; Jade Stighling; Dominic Smith; Thurlow Marsh; Jurick Lewis; Con: Tedder (5)	Referee: Dylen November

=== Grand Final ===
23 May 2026	Griquas	35–38	Pumas	Griqua Park, Kimberley
18:30	Try: Tiaan Lange (2); Cameron Hufke; Janco Uys; Caleb Abrahams; Con: George Whitehead (5)	Report	Try: Jay-Cee Nel (2); Ntsika Fisanti; Wian van Niekerk; Danrich Visagie; Con: Nevaldo Fleurs (4); Danrich Visagie; Pen: Danrich Visagie	Referee: Christopher Allison
