= Toyota Challenge =

Rugby union competition in South Africa

- Sport: Rugby union
- First season: 2021
- No. of teams: 2024 teams: Cheetahs; Emerging Ireland; Griffons; Pumas; Western Force
- Venues: Toyota Stadium, Bloemfontein
- Most recent champion: Emerging Ireland (2024)
- Most titles: Cheetahs (10 titles)

The Toyota Challenge is a rugby union competition hosted in South Africa by the Cheetahs, a team sponsored by Toyota SA. The first tournament took place at the Toyota Stadium in Bloemfontein between 13 November and 26 November 2021.

In 2021, four teams played against the Cheetahs across four matches, with a 250,000 rand prize money for each match. In addition, players were rewarded for "positive play actions" during the games, while fans were rewarded for supporting their favourite teams in the stadium and online on various social media platforms.

The Cheetahs are currently without a permanent tournament, whilst the Stormers and Sharks compete in the United Rugby Championship (URC). CSM Știința Baia Mare competes in Romania's top level professional league the SuperLiga and Diables Barcelona are a newly formed Spanish pro team to promote professionalism in the Spain.

The Toyota Challenge fixtures are broadcast by SuperSport.

The Cheetahs won six out of eight Toyota Challenge matches since 2021 making them the most successful team in the tournament.

In 2022, the competition returned with five team competing in a four-match Toyota Challenge with each match winning again winning a 250,000 rand prize money. The Cheetahs remained as the hosts and are joined by Emerging Ireland, USA Falcons XV and Griquas. Italy A had been set to participate, but later withdrew and replaced by the Bulls.

== Competing teams ==
- Cheetahs (2021, 2022, 2023, 2024, 2025, 2026)
- CSM Știința Baia Mare (2021)
- Diables Barcelona (2021)
- Sharks (2021)
- Stormers XV (2021)
- Western Province XV (2022)
- Bulls (2022)
- Griffons (2024)
- Griquas (2022, 2026)
- Pumas (2022, 2024, 2026)
- Emerging Ireland (2022, 2024)
- USA National A (2022)
- Western Force (2023, 2024)
- (Georgia (country)) Black Lion (2025, 2026)
- Lusitanos (2026)
- Romania A (2026)

== Overall Record ==
The overall record for the teams in the Toyota Challenge matches is as follows:

Toyota Challenge Overall Record
Team Name	Champions	Runner-Up
Cheetahs	11	6
Emerging Ireland	4	0
Western Force	3	4
Black Lion	1	1
Stormers XV	1	0
Diables Barcelona	0	1
Sharks	0	1
CSM Știința Baia Mare	0	1
Bulls	0	1
USA National A	0	1
Griquas	0	1
Pumas	0	1
Griffons	0	1

== 2021 ==
=== Toyota Challenge Fixtures ===
The below fixtures counted towards games where the winners would win the 250,000 rand prize money.

13 November 2021
17:30 SAST (UTC+2)

Cheetahs	30–31	Stormers XV
Try: G. van der Merwe 13' c Kasende 20' c Jasper 71' c Con: Masuku (2/2) 14', 22'; Thomson (1/1) 72'; Pen: Masuku (3/3) 8', 43', 48'	Summary	Try: Theunissen 38' c Senatla (2) 68' c, 80+2' m Con: Mngomezulu (2/3) 39', 69'; Pen: Mngomezulu (4/4) 6', 11', 31', 57'

Toyota Stadium, Bloemfontein
Referee: Marius van der Westhuizen

17 November 2021
17:30 SAST (UTC+2)

Cheetahs	99–15	Diables Barcelona
Try: Brandt (2) 1' m, 9' c Potgieter (2) 17' c, 33' m Boshoff (3) 19' c, 70' c, 76' c Booysen 20' c Mafuma (2) 36' m, 80' c Botha (2) 40' c, 63' c Viljoen 50' c Mohojé 54' c Venter 61' c Con: Thomson (12/15) 10', 18', 20', 22', 40+1', 52', 55', 62', 64', 72', 77', 80+1'	Summary	Try: Brand 31' c Yika 68' m Con: Van Bilion (1/2) 32'; Pen: Van Bilion (1/2) 24'

Toyota Stadium, Bloemfontein
Referee: Cwengile Jadezweni

20 November 2021
14:00 SAST (UTC+2)

Cheetahs	40–34	Sharks
Try: Brandt (2) 25' c, 36' c Brits (2) 41' c, 69' c Con: Masuku (4/4) 26', 38', 42', 71'; Pen: Masuku (4/4) 22', 34', 65', 77'	Summary	Try: Pienaar 3' m Potgieter 19' m Bleuler 54' c Volmink 60' c Ward 80' c Con: Chamberlain (3/5) 55', 62', 80+1'; Pen: Chamberlain (1/1) 6'

Toyota Stadium, Bloemfontein
Referee: Rasta Rasivhenge

26 November 2021
18:15 SAST (UTC+2)

Cheetahs	54–5	CSM Știința Baia Mare
Try: Potgieter 19' c G. van der Merwe 38' m Boshoff 46' c Van der Westhuizen 53' c Penalty try 61'; M. van der Merwe 64' c Masuku 74' c Sekekete 80' c Con: Thomson (2/3) 20', 47'; Masuku (4/4) 54', 65', 75', 80+2'	Summary	Try: Mahlo 3' m

Toyota Stadium, Bloemfontein
Referee: Ruhan Meiring

=== Toyota Friendlies ===
20 November 2021
11:00 SAST (UTC+2)

CSM Știința Baia Mare	72–14	Free State XV

Toyota Stadium, Bloemfontein
Referee: Jaco Kotze

25 November 2021
17:30 SAST (UTC+2)

Diables Barcelona	6–59	Kenya

Toyota Stadium, Bloemfontein
Referee: Griffin Colby

== 2022 ==
=== Toyota Challenge Fixtures ===
The below fixtures counted towards games where the winners would win the 250,000 rand prize money.

30 September 2022
16:15 SAST (UTC+2)

Cheetahs	17–14	Bulls
Try: Mzwanele Zito, Enver Brandt, Chucky van der Westhuizen; Con: Ruan Pienaar		Try: Jacques van Rooyen 13', Penalty try 60'; Con: Morné Steyn 14'

Toyota Stadium, Bloemfontein
Referee: Paul Mente

9 October 2022
13:00 SAST (UTC+2)

Cheetahs	14–21	Emerging Ireland
Try: Penalty try (2) 26' c 75' c	Report	Try: Doak 20' c Daly 53' c Osborne 60' c Con: Crowley (3/3)

Toyota Stadium, Bloemfontein
Referee: Morné Ferreira

14 October 2022
18:00 SAST (UTC+2)

Cheetahs	53–25	(United States) USA Falcons
	Report

Toyota Stadium, Bloemfontein
Referee: Stephan Geldenhuys

21 October 2022
16:15 SAST (UTC+2)

Cheetahs	27–20	Griquas

Toyota Stadium, Bloemfontein
Referee: Christopher Allison

=== Toyota Friendlies ===
30 September 2022
13:45 SAST (UTC+2)

Griquas	7–54	Emerging Ireland
Try: Otto 32' c Con: Fouché (1/1)	Report	Try: Penny (2) 13' c 36' c Baloucoune 24' c Wycherley 40' c Moore 53' c Daly 61' c McCann 68' m Nash 79' c Con: Crowley (6/6); Flannery (1/2)

Toyota Stadium, Bloemfontein
Referee: Morné Ferreira

5 October 2022
17:00 SAST (UTC+2)

Pumas	24–28	Emerging Ireland
Try: Fouché 20' m Swart 30' c de Klerk (2) 60' m 65' c Con: de Beer (2/4)	Report	Try: Mullins 7' c Culhane (2) 10' c 52' c Flannery 16' c Con: Flannery (4/4)

Toyota Stadium, Bloemfontein
Referee: Cwengile Jadezweni

5 October 2022
19:00 SAST (UTC+2)

Griquas	41–7	Bulls

Toyota Stadium, Bloemfontein
Referee: Griffin Colby

9 October 2022
17:00 SAST (UTC+2)

Pumas	27–20	Western Province XV

Toyota Stadium, Bloemfontein
Referee: Griffin Colby

21 October 2022
13:45 SAST (UTC+2)

Pumas	33–15	(United States) USA Falcons
	Report

Toyota Stadium, Bloemfontein
Referee: Jaco Peyper

== 2023 ==
=== Toyota Challenge Fixtures ===
The below fixtures counted towards games where the winners would win the 250,000 rand prize money.

26 August 2023

Cheetahs	31–27	Western Force

Toyota Stadium, Bloemfontein

2 September 2023

Cheetahs	27–12	Western Force

Toyota Stadium, Bloemfontein

29 September 2023

Western Force	30–27	Cheetahs

Lane Group Stadium, Mandurah

7 October 2023

Western Force	22–32	Cheetahs

Revo Fitness Stadium, Claremont

== 2024 ==
2 October 2024
16:00 SAST (UTC+2)

Emerging Ireland	36–24	Pumas
Try: Ward 14' m Murray 28' c Izuchukwu 39' c Smyth 42' m McCarthy 61' m Penalty try 76'; Con: Prendergast (2/4) 28', 39'	Report	Try: Msenge 32' c Swanepoel (2) 55' c, 80' m Swart 73' m Con: Swart (2/4) 32', 55'

Toyota Stadium, Bloemfontein
Referee: Stephan Geldenhuys (South Africa)

2 October 2024
19:00 SAST (UTC+2)

Cheetahs	24–38	Western Force
Try: van der Merwe 16' c Annies 43' m Wegner 63' m Paulo 80+2' c Con: Wentzel (1/3) 17'; Loubser (1/1) 80+3'	Report	Try: Potter (2) 4' c, 37' c Dolly 31' m Harris 47' c Con: Burey (3/4) 5', 39', 49'; Pen: Burey (2/2) 19', 40+1'; Miln (2/2) 70', 73'

Toyota Stadium, Bloemfontein
Referee: Ben Whitehouse (Wales)

6 October 2024
13:00 SAST (UTC+2)

Emerging Ireland	29–24	Western Force
	Report

Toyota Stadium, Bloemfontein
Referee: H van Rooyen (South Africa)

6 October 2024
15:45 SAST (UTC+2)

Cheetahs	45–21	Griffons
	Report

Toyota Stadium, Bloemfontein

9 October 2024
19:00 SAST (UTC+2)

Cheetahs	24–33	Emerging Ireland

Toyota Stadium, Bloemfontein

== 2025 ==
17 October 2025

Cheetahs	38–39	Black Lion
	Report

Toyota Stadium, Bloemfontein
Referee: Hanru van Rooyen (South Africa)

26 October 2025

Cheetahs	24–5	Black Lion
	Report

Toyota Stadium, Bloemfontein
Referee: Hanru van Rooyen (South Africa)

26 October 2025

Cheetahs Legends	22–25	Bulls Legends
	Report

Toyota Stadium, Bloemfontein

== 2026 ==
5 June 2026
13:30

Pumas (South Africa)	36–46	Black Lion
	Report

Toyota Stadium, Bloemfontein
Referee: Christopher Allison

5 June 2026
15:30

Griquas (South Africa)	35–20	Romania A
	Report

Toyota Stadium, Bloemfontein
Referee: Griffin Colby

5 June 2026
18:00

Cheetahs (South Africa)	54–24	Lusitanos
	Report

Toyota Stadium, Bloemfontein
Referee: Hanru van Rooyen

10 June 2026
13:30

Griquas (South Africa)	56-21	Black Lion
	Report

Toyota Stadium, Bloemfontein
Referee: Lulutho Matomela

10 June 2026
15:30

Pumas (South Africa)	57-24	Lusitanos
	Report

Toyota Stadium, Bloemfontein
Referee: Griffin Colby

10 June 2026
18:00

Cheetahs (South Africa)	47-14	Romania A
	Report

Toyota Stadium, Bloemfontein
Referee: Juan de Bod

14 June 2026
12:00

Griquas (South Africa)	76-7	Lusitanos
	Report

Toyota Stadium, Bloemfontein
Referee: Christopher Allison

14 June 2026
14:00

Pumas (South Africa)	46-26	Romania A
	Report

Toyota Stadium, Bloemfontein
Referee: Aimee Barrett-Theron

14 June 2026
16:30

Cheetahs (South Africa)	47-31	Black Lion
	Report

Toyota Stadium, Bloemfontein
Referee: Morne Ferreira

== See also ==
- 2021 end-of-year rugby union internationals
- 2022 end-of-year rugby union internationals
