= Bobby Alexander =

Bobby Alexander may refer to:

- Bobby Alexander (footballer), Scottish footballer
- Bobby Alexander (rugby union), South African rugby union player
