= Clinton Swart =

South African rugby union footballer

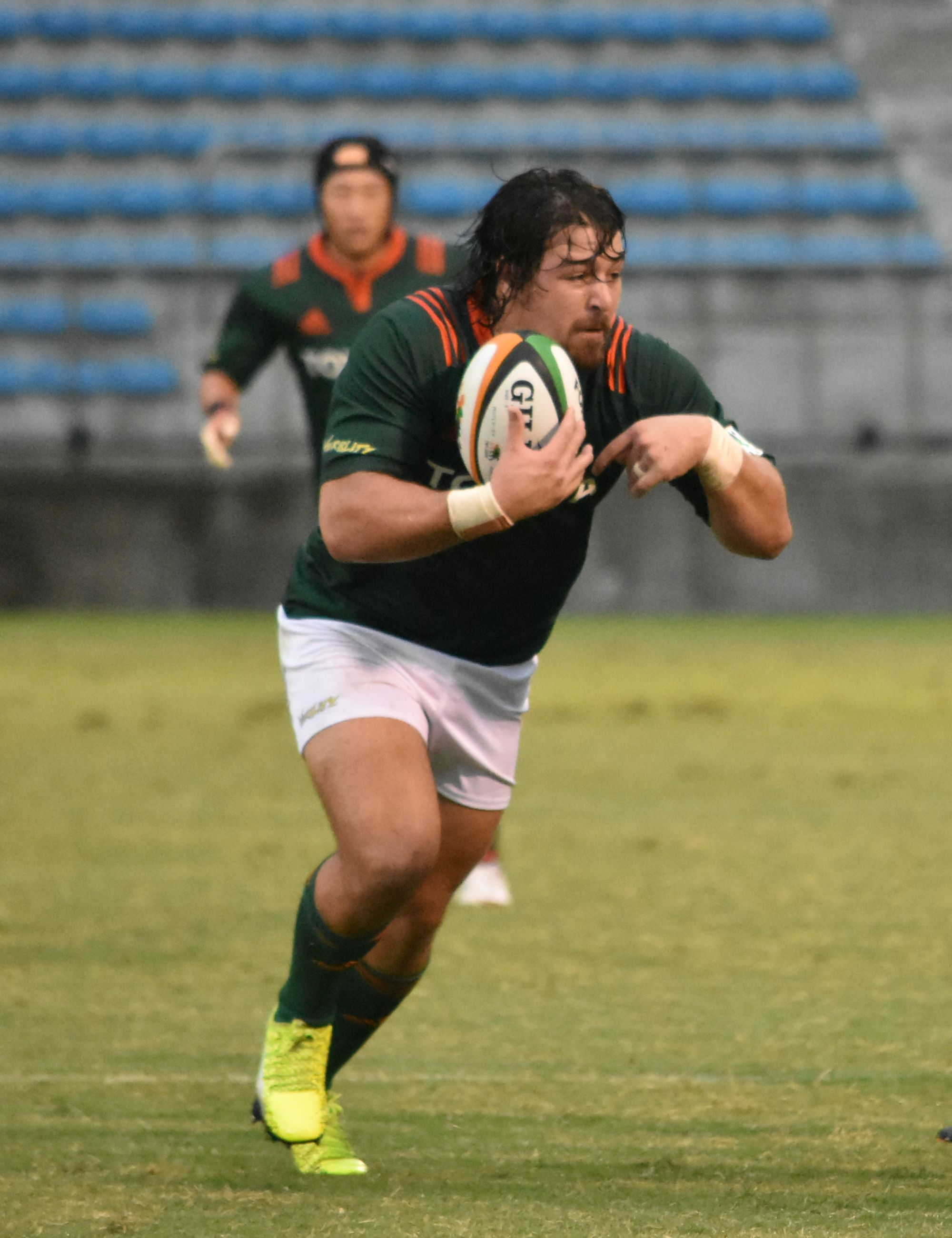
- Full name: Clinton Ryno Swart
- Born: 6 September 1992 (age 34) Standerton, South Africa
- Height: 1.84 m (6 ft 1/2 in)
- Weight: 98 kg (15 st 6 lb; 216 lb)
- School: Standerton Hoërskool, Standerton
- University: University of Pretoria

Rugby union career
- Position: Fly-half / Inside centre
Youth career
- 2010–2011: Pumas
- 2012–2013: Blue Bulls
Amateur team(s)
Years	Team	Apps	(Points)
2014	UP Tuks	0	(0)
Senior career
Years	Team	Apps	(Points)
2014	Falcons	4	(3)
2015–2017	Griquas	41	(266)
2017–2018	Cheetahs	17	(20)
2018–2020	Toyota Verblitz	16	(82)
2020–2021	Bulls	5	(0)
2020–2021	Blue Bulls	1	(2)
2022–2023	Shizuoka Blue Revs	8	(8)
- Correct as of 13 September 2021

Clinton Ryno Swart (born 6 September 1992) is a professional South African rugby union player for Toyota Verblitz in the Top League in Japan. His regular position is fly-half or inside centre.

== Career ==
=== Youth ===
Swart played first team rugby for Hoërskool Standerton between 2009 and 2011, resulting in his call-up to the Pumas squad for the Under-18 Craven Week tournament. He played in two of their matches in the competition, scoring eight points with the boot as his side beat their Griquas counterparts 38–7 and a further six points in their 28–11 defeat to the Golden Lions.

In 2011, Swart became involved with the Pumas U19 side that competed in the 2011 Under-19 Provincial Championship. Playing at inside centre, he made five appearances in the competition, scoring one try and kicking three conversions to end with a points tally of 11.

The following year, Swart moved to Pretoria where he joined the Blue Bulls and made two substitute appearances for the Blue Bulls U21 side during the 2012 Under-19 Provincial Championship. He was also included in the UP Tuks' Varsity Cup squad in 2014, but failed to make any appearances for the university side.

=== Falcons ===
In 2014, Swart made the short move from Pretoria to the East Rand to join the Falcons during the 2014 Currie Cup First Division. He made his first class debut when he came on as a substitute in their 36–27 victory over Welkom-based side the Griffons. Despite a defeat in his next appearance in their final match of the regular season against the Leopards, the Falcons secured qualification to the semi-finals of the competition, where they were due to meet the same opponents. This time, the Falcons ran out 31–24 winners over the Leopards in Potchefstroom, with Swart – making his first ever senior start – being a key player in their surprise victory, setting up tries for JP Mostert and Dirk Dippenaar.

However, his inclusion in the side for the semi-final proved to be controversial, as the Leopards lodged a complaint with the South African Rugby Union regarding Swart's eligibility to play in the match. The Leopards argued that he was only available to the Falcons for the final two matches of the Currie Cup First Division competition and therefore not eligible to play in the Semi-Finals. However, SARU Judicial Officer Rob Stelzner SC, ruled that Swart fulfilled the required eligibility criteria and rejected the complaint.

=== Griquas ===
In October 2014, it was announced that Swart signed a two-year contract with Griquas to play his rugby in Kimberley in 2015 and 2016. Shortly after signing the contract Naka Drotské, the head coach of Super Rugby side the Cheetahs, released the names of his side's wider training squad prior to the 2015 Super Rugby season, with Swart included the 59-man shortlist. He did not make the final group for the competition, instead representing Griquas in the 2015 Vodacom Cup, where he made six appearances as Griquas reached the quarter final of the competition. Swart kicked twelve points on his Griquas debut in a match against the Border Bulldogs in a 37–25 victory and scored his first try for Griquas in their next match, a 62–19 win over the Boland Cavaliers in Velddrif. He played off the bench in their quarter final match against the Pumas, but could not prevent his side being eliminated from the competition after losing the match 14–28 to the eventual champions.

Swart made five appearances for Griquas during the 2015 Currie Cup qualification series. He scored one try in their top-of-the-table clash with the Leopards and one in their match against the Falcons in a 57–33 victory in Kempton Park to help Griquas win the qualifying series to secure a spot in the 2015 Currie Cup Premier Division. He made his Currie Cup Premier Division debut against his former side the Blue Bulls in a 12–36 defeat in Round Two of the competition. He signed a contract extension with Griquas, committing him to the team until the end of 2017.
