= 1899 Currie Cup =

Domestic rugby union competition

- Countries: South Africa
- Champions: Griqualand West (1st title)

The 1899 Currie Cup was the sixth edition of the Currie Cup, the premier domestic rugby union competition in South Africa.

The tournament was won by Griqualand West for the first time, who won three of their matches in the competition and drew the fourth.

However, the winner of the first five tournaments, Western Province, did not participate in the 1899 event due to the impending Anglo-Boer War, nor did Transvaal. Only Border, Eastern Province, Griqualand West and Rhodesia took part.

== See also ==
- Currie Cup
