= SA Cup =

Domestic rugby union competition

- Current season or competition: 2026 SA Cup
- Sport: Rugby union
- Instituted: 2024
- Inaugural season: 2024
- Number of teams: 10
- Country: South Africa
- Holders: Pumas (2026)
- Most titles: Pumas (2) (1 title)
- Related competition: Currie Cup, Mzanzi Challenge

The SA Cup is a South African domestic rugby union cup competition held since 2024. It was created to replace the Mzanzi Challenge, which was played for only one season in 2023, and serves as qualification to the Currie Cup Premier Division and First Division. The domestic teams with a place in the United Rugby Championship, namely the Blue Bulls, Stormers, Sharks and Golden Lions, are excluded from the SA Cup.

The top four teams in the 2025 SA Cup will join the four United Rugby Championship teams in the 2025 Currie Cup Premier Division and the remaining six teams will battle it out for the 2025 Currie Cup First Division title.

== Teams ==
SA Cup teams
Team	Sponsored name
Boland Cavaliers	Sanlam Boland Cavaliers
Border Bulldogs	Border Bulldogs
Eastern Province	Eastern Province
Cheetahs	Toyota Cheetahs
Griffons	Griffons
Griquas	Suzuki Griquas
Leopards	Leopards
Pumas	Airlink Pumas
SWD Eagles	SWD Eagles
Valke	Valke

== Finals ==
The results of the finals played in the SA Cup competition are as follows:

Rugby Challenge finals
Season	Winner	Score	Runner-Up
2024	Griquas	46–24	Pumas
2025	Pumas	39–14	Griquas
2026	Pumas	38–35	Griquas

=== Overall record ===
The overall record for the teams in the SA Cup competition is as follows:

SA Cup overall record
Team Name	Champions	Runner-Up	Semi-Final	Years Champion
Pumas	2	1	0	2025, 2026
Griquas	1	2	0	2024
Boland Cavaliers	0	0	2	
Cheetahs	0	0	2	
Eastern Province	0	0	0	
Valke	0	0	0	
Leopards	0	0	0	
SWD Eagles	0	0	0	
Border Bulldogs	0	0	0	
Griffons	0	0	0	

=== Top point scorers ===
Top point scorers
Season	Team	Name	Points
2024	Griquas	George Whitehead	150
2025	Pumas	Danrich Visagie	112
2026	Pumas	George Whitehead	83

=== Top try scorers ===
Top try scorers
Season	Team	Name	Tries
2024	Pumas	Darnell Osuagwu	11
2025	Griquas	Gurshwin Wehr	15
2026	Griquas	Connor Mahoney	14

== See also ==
- Rugby union in South Africa
- Currie Cup
- SA Rugby Under-23 Cup
- Mzanzi Challenge
- SuperSport Rugby Challenge
- Vodacom Cup
- Bankfin Nite Series
