= Leon Lyons (rugby union) =

South African rugby union player

- Full name: Leon Lyons
- Born: 2 December 1998 (age 27) East London, South Africa
- Height: 1.87 m (6 ft 1 1/2 in)
- Weight: 108 kg (238 lb)
- School: Selborne College
- University: Stellenbosch University

Rugby union career
- Position: Prop
- Current team: Stormers / Western Province
Senior career
Years	Team	Apps	(Points)
2018	Border Bulldogs	1	(0)
2018–2024	Western Province	21	(0)
2020–2024	Stormers	8	(0)
2024-	Griquas		
2025-26	Lions		
2026	Glasgow Warriors		(0)

Leon Lyons (born 2 December 1998) is a South African professional rugby union player for Glasgow Warriors in the United Rugby Championship. He previously played for Stormers in Super Rugby and Western Province in the Rugby Challenge. His regular position is prop.

Lyons made his Currie Cup debut while on loan at the Border Bulldogs in their match against the Boland Cavaliers in September 2025, coming on as a replacement prop. He signed for the Stormers Super Rugby side for the 2020 Super Rugby season.

He signed for Glasgow Warriors in a short term deal in November 2026.
