= 2026 Currie Cup First Division =

Domestic rugby union competition

- Countries: South Africa
- Date: – 24 July
- Champions: SWD Eagles (4th title)
- Runners-up: Valke

The 2026 Currie Cup First Division was the 88th edition of the Currie Cup. As the second-tier of the competition, it ran alongside the 2026 Currie Cup Premier Division. It was sponsored by beer brand Carling Black Label and organised by the South African Rugby Union.

The 2026 SA Cup determined which teams participated, with the top four joining the United Rugby Championship teams in the 2026 Currie Cup Premier Division, and the bottom six playing in the First Division.

The division was contested by the same teams as in 2025, with the Griffons attempting to defend their title.

It was won by South-Western Districts, coached by ex-Springbok coach Heyneke Meyer, who described the win as the greatest achievement of his career.

== Teams ==
Location of teams in the 2026 Currie Cup First Division

The six competing teams were:

2026 Currie Cup First Division
Team	Sponsored name
Border	Border
Eastern Province	Eastern Province
Griffons	Griffons
Leopards	Leopards
SWD Eagles	Dotsure SWD Eagles
Valke	Valke

=== Standings ===
2026 Currie Cup First Division standings
Pos	Team	Pld	W	D	L	PF	PA	PD	TF	TA	TB	LB	Pts	Qualification
1	SWD Eagles	5	4	0	1	275	157	+118	43	23	0	0	22	Semi-Final
2	Eastern Province	5	4	0	1	187	143	+44	26	21	0	0	20	Semi-Final
3	Valke	5	3	0	2	248	159	+89	38	24	0	0	18	Semi-Final
4	Leopards	5	2	0	3	173	182	−9	25	30	0	0	14	Semi-Final
5	Griffons	5	2	0	3	148	167	−19	24	26	0	0	11	
6	Border	5	0	0	5	74	297	−223	12	44	0	0	1	

Source: springboks.rugby
Rules for classification: Tournament points in the standings were awarded to teams as follows:
- 4 points for a win.
- 2 points for a draw.
- 1 bonus point for a loss in a match by seven points or under.
- 1 bonus point for scoring four tries or more.
Teams were ranked in the standings firstly by tournament points then by: (a) points difference from all matches (points scored less points conceded); (b) tries difference from all matches (tries scored less tries conceded); (c) points difference from the matches between the tied teams; (d) points scored in all matches; (e) tries scored in all matches; and, if needed, (f) a coin toss.

=== Semi-finals ===
18 July 2026	SWD Eagles	59–10	Leopards	Outeniqua Park, George
15:00		Report		Referee: Caleb Hibbert

18 July 2026	Eastern Province	12–44	Valke	Madibaz Stadium, Gqeberha
15:00		Report		Referee: Paul Mente

=== Final ===
24 July 2026	SWD Eagles	41–21	Valke	Outeniqua Park, George
19:15		Report		Referee: Jonathan Lee Lottering

== See also ==
- 2026 Currie Cup Premier Division
- 2026 SA Cup
