= Diables Barcelona =

Spanish rugby union club, based in Barcelona

Diables
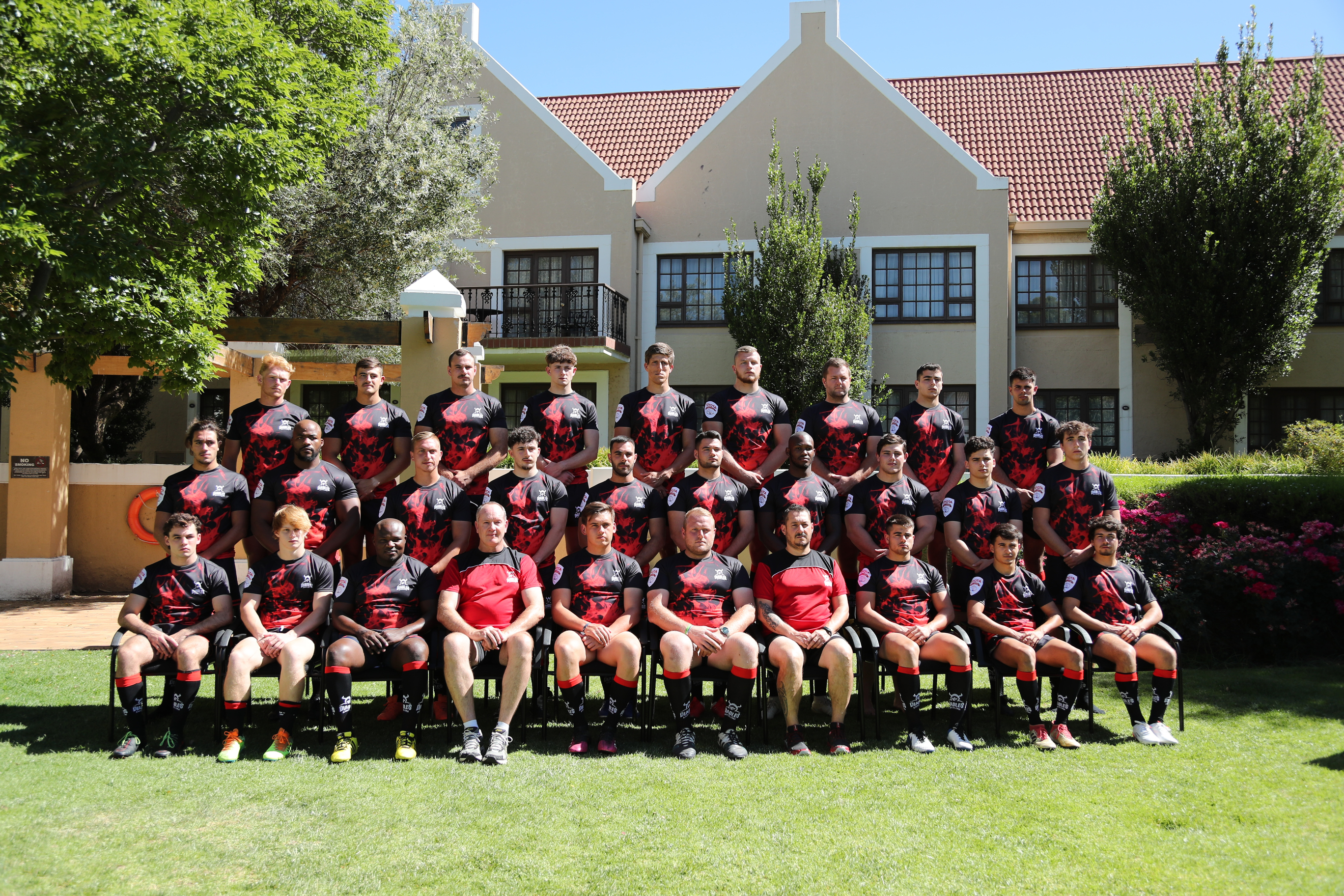
- Founded: 2021; 5 years ago (Diables franchise)
- Location: Barcelona, Spain
- Region: Catalonia
- President: Jordi Homs
- League: Currie Cup

Official website
- barcelonarugby.eu

The Diables Barcelona are a professional rugby union franchise from the city of Barcelona that was born in 2021 to compete in an international franchise league.

The Diables made their first appearance in November 2021 to play in the Toyota Challenge tournament at the Free State Stadium in Bloemfontein, South Africa.

The franchise aspires to participate in a new international competition that is being created and already has a place guaranteed. This new competition will mainly involve teams from southern Africa and Europe. Some of the franchises have already announced their willingness to participate, such as the Cheetahs or Kuva Blue thunder of Zimbabwe.

Diables Barcelona Toyota Challenge squad
**Hookers**: (South Africa) Jean-Pierre Lieberum; (South Africa) Khwezilokusa Mkhafu; **Props**: (South Africa) Stephan de Jager; (Catalonia) Joan Domenech; (South Africa) Bart Le Roux; (South Africa) Buhle Nojekwa; (South Africa) Martin Oosthuizen; **Locks**: (South Africa) Michael Benadie; (South Africa) Wilmer Coetzer; (Catalonia) Gerard Ginel; (South Africa) Albert Kapenda; (South Africa) Chris van Heerden	**Loose forwards**: (South Africa) Edmund Brand; (South Africa) Christo Bester; (Catalonia) Oriol Fariñas; (Catalonia) Bernat Guilera; (South Africa) Chris van Heerden; **Scrum-halves**: (Catalonia) Felipe Brill; (Catalonia) Pol Fonts; (South Africa) Vani Pijoos; (South Africa) Sean Snyman; **Fly-halves**: (South Africa) Hanno van Biljon	**Centres**: (Catalonia) Roberto Deligios; (South Africa) Liyema Gaba; (South Africa) Hedley Hadlow; (Catalonia) Julen Sánchez; **Wingers**: (Catalonia) Tomàs Casat; (Catalonia) David Hinojosa; (Catalonia) Fransesc Pulido; (South Africa) Tisetso Yika; **Fullbacks**: (Chile) Matias Giannetti; (Ireland) Aaron Kelly
(c) Denotes team captain, **Bold** denotes internationally capped, ^{DEV} denotes a development squad player, ^{ST} denotes a short-term signing, denotes a player ruled out for the season with injury.

== See also ==
- Toyota Challenge
