= Esethu Mnebelele =

South African rugby union player

- Full name: Siphosethu Mnebelele
- Born: 18 February 2006 (age 20) Carletonville, South Africa
- Height: 183 cm (6 ft 0 in)
- Weight: 111 kg (245 lb; 17 st 7 lb)
- School: King Edward VII School, Johannesburg

Rugby union career
- Position: Hooker
- Current team: Sharks
Senior career
Years	Team	Apps	(Points)
2025–2026	Bulls		
2026–	Sharks	5	(0)
- Correct as of 1 November 2026
International career
Years	Team	Apps	(Points)
2025–2026	South Africa U20	12	(30)
- Correct as of 1 November 2026

Esethu Mnebelele (born 18 February 2006) is a South African rugby union player, who plays for the Sharks. His preferred position is hooker.

== Early career ==
Mnebelele was born in Carletonville, and attended King Edward VII School, Johannesburg. Having lost both his parents as a child, he turned to rugby, captaining the Lions side at Craven Week in 2024. His performances earned him selection for the SA Schools side, who he again captained in 2024. He would then progress to the South Africa U19 side, where he was again a member of the leadership team, before representing the South Africa U20 side in 2025, where he was expected to be fast tracked to the full South Africa side but missed out through injury. He returned to the U20 side in 2026, again as captain.

== Professional career ==
Having been a member of the Bulls academy, Mnebelele was named in the Bulls squad for the 2025 Currie Cup Premier Division competition, where he debuted against the Sharks. He would remain with the Bulls for the 2026 competition. In February 2026, it was announced he would be joining the Sharks ahead of the 2026/27 season. He debuted for the Sharks in Round 1 of the 2026–27 United Rugby Championship against the Ospreys.

Mnebelele was named in the South Africa A side for their match against Zimbabwe in June 2026, where he started the match.
