= List of Griquas (rugby union) players =

This is a list of rugby union footballers who have played for the Griquas in Super Rugby. The list includes any player that has played in a regular season match, semi-final or final for the Griquas, ordered by debut date and name. The Griquas competed in the Super Rugby Unlocked competition.

== Super Rugby players ==
| No. | Name | Caps | Tries | C | P | DG | Points | Debut | Last |
|---|---|---|---|---|---|---|---|---|---|
| 1 | Zak Burger | 6 | 1 | | | | 5 | 10/10/2020 | 21/11/2020 |
| 2 | Carl Els | 6 | | | | | | 10/10/2020 | 21/11/2020 |
| 3 | Ian Groenewald | 2 | | | | | | 10/10/2020 | 17/10/2020 |
| 4 | John-Roy Jenkinson | 3 | | | | | | 10/10/2020 | 30/10/2020 |
| 5 | Niell Jordaan | 2 | | | | | | 10/10/2020 | 17/10/2020 |
| 6 | Daniel Kasende | 4 | | | | | | 10/10/2020 | 21/11/2020 |
| 7 | Harlon Klaasen | 5 | | | | | | 10/10/2020 | 21/11/2020 |
| 8 | HJ Luus | 6 | 1 | | | | 5 | 10/10/2020 | 21/11/2020 |
| 9 | Nqoba Mxoli | 5 | | | | | | 10/10/2020 | 21/11/2020 |
| 10 | Victor Sekekete | 2 | 1 | | | | 5 | 10/10/2020 | 17/10/2020 |
| 11 | André Swarts | 4 | | | | | | 10/10/2020 | 21/11/2020 |
| 12 | James Verity-Amm | 4 | 3 | | | | 15 | 10/10/2020 | 07/11/2020 |
| 13 | Anthony Volmink | 2 | 1 | | | | 5 | 10/10/2020 | 17/10/2020 |
| 14 | George Whitehead | 4 | | 6 | 6 | | 30 | 10/10/2020 | 07/11/2020 |
| 15 | Stefan Willemse | 6 | | | | | | 10/10/2020 | 21/11/2020 |
| 16 | Zandré Jordaan | 2 | | | | | | 10/10/2020 | 17/10/2020 |
| 17 | Madot Mabokela | 4 | | | | | | 10/10/2020 | 13/11/2020 |
| 18 | Bandisa Ndlovu | 3 | | | | | | 10/10/2020 | 21/11/2020 |
| 19 | Adré Smith | 6 | 1 | | | | 5 | 10/10/2020 | 21/11/2020 |
| 20 | Gideon van der Merwe | 6 | 1 | | | | 5 | 10/10/2020 | 21/11/2020 |
| 21 | Ashlon Davids | 2 | | | | | | 10/10/2020 | 17/10/2020 |
| 22 | Berton Klaasen | 2 | | | | | | 10/10/2020 | 17/10/2020 |
| 23 | Alandré van Rooyen | 2 | | | | | | 10/10/2020 | 17/10/2020 |
| 24 | Andrew Beerwinkel | 5 | | | | | | 17/10/2020 | 21/11/2020 |
| 25 | Ederies Arendse | 4 | 1 | | | | 5 | 30/10/2020 | 21/11/2020 |
| 26 | Eduan Keyter | 4 | 1 | | | | 5 | 30/10/2020 | 21/11/2020 |
| 27 | Ewald van der Westhuizen | 4 | | | | | | 30/10/2020 | 21/11/2020 |
| 28 | Mzwanele Zito | 2 | | | | | | 30/10/2020 | 07/11/2020 |
| 29 | Tinus de Beer | 4 | 1 | 3 | 9 | | 38 | 30/10/2020 | 21/11/2020 |
| 30 | Ewan Coetzee | 3 | | | | | | 30/10/2020 | 21/11/2020 |
| 31 | Masixole Banda | 3 | | | | | | 30/10/2020 | 21/11/2020 |
| 32 | Johan Momsen | 3 | | | | | | 30/10/2020 | 13/11/2020 |
| 33 | Theo Maree | 4 | | | | | | 30/10/2020 | 21/11/2020 |
| 34 | Monde Hadebe | 4 | | | | | | 30/10/2020 | 21/11/2020 |
| 35 | Bjorn Basson | 1 | | | | | | 07/11/2020 | 07/11/2020 |
| 36 | Johnathan Francke | 3 | | | | | | 07/11/2020 | 21/11/2020 |
| 37 | Cameron Lindsay | 2 | | | | | | 13/11/2020 | 21/11/2020 |
| 38 | CJ Velleman | 2 | | | | | | 13/11/2020 | 21/11/2020 |
