= Pumas (Currie Cup) =

(South Africa) Pumas
- Full name: Pumas
- Union: Mpumalanga Rugby Union
- Emblem: Puma
- Founded: 1969
- Region: Mpumalanga Province
- Ground(s): Mbombela Stadium, Mbombela (Capacity: 43,500)
- Coach: Jimmy Stonehouse
- Captain: Willie Engelbrecht
- League(s): Currie Cup; SA Cup
- 2026 CC 2026 SA: Runners-up; 3rd overall Champions; 2nd overall
Team kit	2nd kit

Official website
- pumas.co.za
- Current season

The Pumas are a South African professional rugby union team that competes in the Premier Division of the Currie Cup. The team draws their players from Mpumalanga Province (formerly known as the South Eastern Transvaal) and plays at the Mbombela Stadium in Mbombela, having previously also played at the Puma Stadium in Witbank.

== History ==
Formed in 1969 as South Eastern Transvaal, the Pumas are one of the younger unions in the country. The team won the Currie Cup for the first time in 2022.

Pumas won the Currie Cup First Division (the second tier competition) in 2005 and 2009, both times earning promotion to the Currie Cup Premier Division.

For their 2010 Currie Cup campaign, the Pumas appointed the seasoned Jimmy Stonehouse as coach. Despite being newly-promoted, the team achieved a notable result on 27 August 2010, beating current champions the Blue Bulls 22–21 at the Mbombela Stadium in Mbombela. They eventually finished 7th.

=== Super Rugby ===
In 2020, the Pumas were invited to play in the Super Rugby Unlocked competition. A list of players who represented the side in the competition can be found here.

== Honours ==
=== Major Honours ===
- Currie Cup Premier Division
  - Champions (1) 2022
  - Runner-up: (2) 2023, 2026
- Currie Cup First Division
  - Champions: (3) 2005, 2009, 2013
  - Runner-up: (1) 2012
- SA Cup:
  - Champions: (2) 2025, 2026
  - Runner-up: (1) 2024
- Vodacom Cup
  - Champions: (1) 2015
  - Runner-up: (1) 2013
- SuperSport Rugby Challenge
  - Champions: (1) 2018
  - Runner-up: (1) 2019

=== Minor Honours ===
- Tbilisi Cup
  - Champions: (1) 2026
- Airlink Cup 2023
- Toyota Challenge: runner up 2024

== Current squad ==
The Pumas squad for the 2026 season is: (Note: Darnell Osuagwu was named in the 2026 Pumas squad, but joined the Boland Cavaliers during the 2026 Currie Cup.)

2026 Pumas squad
**Props**: (South Africa) Junior Banda; (South Africa) Stephan de Jager; (South Africa) Kudzwai Dube; (South Africa) Etienne Janeke; (South Africa) Bryan le Roux; (South Africa) Zukisa Sali; (South Africa) Sampie Swiegers; **Hookers**: (South Africa) Jan-Henning Campher; (South Africa) Gustav du Rand; (South Africa) Jordan McLoughlin (Note: Addition for 2026 Currie Cup); (South Africa) Chyle van Zyl; **Locks**: (Namibia) **Tiaan de Klerk**; (South Africa) Andre Goedhals; (South Africa) Patrick Kitete; (South Africa) Stephan Krugel (Note: Addition for 2026 Currie Cup); (South Africa) Miyelani Ngobeni; (South Africa) JJ Scheepers; (South Africa) Hanno Theunissen	**Loose forwards**: (South Africa) Heinz Bertram; (South Africa) Willie Engelbrecht **(c)**; (South Africa) Ntsika Fisanti; (South Africa) Andre Fouché; (South Africa) De Wet Marais; (South Africa) Armand Maritz; (South Africa) Marvelous Mashimbyi; (South Africa) Thabo Ndimande (Note: Addition for 2026 Currie Cup); (South Africa) Ruwald van der Merwe; **Scrum-halves**: (South Africa) Thomas Bursey; (South Africa) Ruswill Fredericks; (South Africa) Raegan Oranje; (South Africa) Conor van Eden; **Fly-halves**: (South Africa) Nevaldo Fleurs; (South Africa) Clinton Swart; (South Africa) Danrich Visagie	**Centres**: (South Africa) Troy Delport (Note: Addition for 2026 Currie Cup); (Namibia) **Jay-Cee Nel**; (South Africa) Logan Opperman; (South Africa) Wian van Niekerk; (South Africa) Sango Xamlashe; **Wingers**: (South Africa) Darren Adonis; (South Africa) Dalvon Blood; (South Africa) Banie Britz (Note: Addition for 2026 Currie Cup); (South Africa) Alfondso Isaacs; (South Africa) Lundi Msenge; **Fullbacks**: (South Africa) Andrew Kota; (South Africa) Tino Swanepoel; (South Africa) Valentino Wellman
**(c)** denotes the team captain. **Bold** denotes internationally capped players. * denotes players qualified to play for South Africa on residency or dual nationality. Source:
