= Gustav du Rand =

South African rugby union player

- Full name: Gustav du Rand
- Born: South Africa
- Height

Rugby union career
- Position: Hooker
- Current team: Griquas
Senior career
Years	Team	Apps	(Points)
2019–2021	Leopards	10	(15)
2022–	Griquas	7	(10)
- Correct as of 10 July 2022

Gustav du Rand is a South African rugby union player for the Griquas in the Currie Cup. His regular position is hooker.

Du Rand was named in the Griquas side for the 2022 Currie Cup Premier Division. He made his Currie Cup debut for the Griquas against the Western Province in Round 4 of the 2022 Currie Cup Premier Division.
