= George Whitehead (rugby union) =

South African rugby union player

- Full name: George Alexander Whitehead
- Born: 17 March 1989 (age 37) Bloemfontein, South Africa
- Height: 1.85 m (6 ft 1 in)
- Weight: 89 kg (196 lb; 14 st 0 lb)
- School: Grey College, Bloemfontein
- University: University of the Free State

Rugby union career
- Position: Fly-half / Fullback
- Current team: Griquas
Youth career
- 2005–2009: Free State Cheetahs
Amateur team(s)
Years	Team	Apps	(Points)
2010–2011	UFS Shimlas	11	(71)
Senior career
Years	Team	Apps	(Points)
2009–2010	Free State Cheetahs	9	(18)
2011–2015	Eastern Province Kings	50	(264)
2013	Southern Kings	17	(31)
2016	Griffons	18	(291)
2016	Cheetahs	3	(2)
2017–present	Griquas	76	(786)
2018	Stormers	3	(2)
2019–2020	Cheetahs	4	(3)
- Correct as of 10 July 2022

George Alexander Whitehead (born 17 March 1989) is a South African professional rugby union player who plays as a fly-half for the Sharks, on loan from the Griquas.

== Career ==
=== Free State / Shimlas ===
Born in Bloemfontein, he attended Grey College. Whitehead represented Free State in several youth competitions; he played for them at the under-16 Grant Khomo Week competition in 2005 and at the under-18 Craven Week competition in 2006.

After finishing high school, he joined their Academy and played for the Free State U19 side in the 2008 under-19 Provincial Championship. The following season, he was part of the Free State U21 squad that played in the 2009 under-21 Provincial Championship. He also made his first class debut for their senior side, the Free State Cheetahs during the 2009 Currie Cup Premier Division, coming on as a late replacement in their match against the Sharks, but finishing on the wrong end of a 24–13 result.

In 2010, Whitehead played Varsity Cup rugby for the UFS Shimlas. He started five of their matches during the 2010 Varsity Cup and ended the competition as Shimlas' top scorer, contributing 45 points with the boot. He was heavily involved in theFree State Cheetahs' 2010 Vodacom Cup campaign, starting eight of their ten matches in the competition to help them reach the final for the third time in their history. He scored his first senior points in their opening match of the season, a conversion in the third minute of a 22–13 victory over SWD Eagles in George. His first try came in their third match, a 17–26 defeat to the Sharks XV in Empangeni He started their semi-final match, helping them beat Boland Cavaliers 22–14 in Wellington and also played all 80 minutes of the final, but could not prevent them falling to a 29–31 defeat to hosts Blue Bulls.

Later in 2010, Whitehead played a crucial rule in theFree State U21 run to the semi-finals of the 2010 Under-21 Provincial Championship, scoring three tries and kicking 120 points with the boot to end the season as Free State's top points scorer.

Whitehead then played on six occasions for UFS Shimlas in the 2011 Varsity Cup competition, contributing 26 points.

=== Eastern Province Kings ===
After the 2011 Varsity Cup competition, Whitehead moved to Port Elizabeth to join the Eastern Province Kings for the 2011 Currie Cup First Division. He made his EP Kings debut in their first round home match against the SWD Eagles; he came on with just 20 minutes left in the match, but kicked three penalties to help his side to a 28–20 victory. He started their next three matches of the competition, but then found himself behind Louis Strydom in the pecking order. Nevertheless, he still played a crucial part in their season, scoring a total of 56 points – second only to Strydom for the Kings – to help them finish in second spot in the log. He kicked a conversion in their comprehensive 48–17 semi-final victory over the Falcons in the semi-final, but could not help them to victory in the final, where they lost 12–43 to the Boland Cavaliers.

Whitehead was involved in a car accident at the start of 2012, sustaining injuries that kept him out of the entire 2012 Vodacom Cup. He returned to fitness in time for the kick-off of the 2012 Currie Cup First Division season and scored the EP Kings' first try of the season in the 12th minute of their 25–20 victory over defending champions Boland Cavaliers in Wellington. He played in a total of fifteen matches during the season, top-scoring for the Kings with 142 points to help them reach their third consecutive final in the competition. His kicking boot proved crucial as he contributed eleven points in the Kings' 26–25 victory over rivals, the newly-relegated Pumas, to help the Kings clinch their second First Division title in three seasons. He played in both legs of their promotion play-off matches against former side the Free State Cheetahs and scored ten points in the two matches, but could not prevent them losing 20–69 on aggregate to remain in the First Division.

With theSouthern Kings being granted entry to play in the 2013 Super Rugby season, Whitehead was named in their 35-man squad. The Kings signed Demetri Catrakilis to be their first-choice fly-half and kicker, which meant that Whitehead was mainly used as backup to him and fullback SP Marais. He was an unused substitute in the Kings' historic first-ever Super Rugby match, which they won 22–10 against Australian side the Force, but made his debut the following week as he came on as a late replacement in their 12–21 loss to the Sharks. After another appearance off the bench against the Chiefs, Whitehead made his starting debut in their 20–55 loss to the Crusaders in Christchurch and marked the occasion by scoring his first Super Rugby try, which he also subsequently converted. He also started in their loss to the Hurricanes, as well as their match against the Brumbies in Canberra, where an injury-time Cornell du Preez try and subsequent conversion from Demetri Catrakilis earned the Kings a 28–all draw to secure their first log points outside of South Africa. He again started their next match where they went one better, securing their first ever victory on foreign soil by beating the Rebels 30–27 in Melbourne. He eventually made ten starts in the competition and appeared as a substitute a further five times. He scored one more try in the competition, in their final match against the Sharks, but could not prevent the Kings finishing the season bottom of the log. That meant they had to play in a relegation play-off series against the Lions. He played in both legs as the Kings lost 42–44 on aggregate to lose their Super Rugby status for 2014.

Whitehead appeared nine times for the Eastern Province Kings in the 2013 Currie Cup First Division season, scoring two tries and kicking five conversions and they once again qualified for the final. The final was a repeat of the 2012 final, but this time the Pumas ran out as winners of the competition, beating the EP Kings 53–30 in a match in Nelspruit. A decision from the South African Rugby Union to expand the Premier Division of the Currie Cup from six teams to eight teams meant that both sides that played in the final were promoted to the 2014 Currie Cup Premier Division.

With the Kings not playing Super Rugby in 2014, Whitehead – along with prop Lizo Gqoboka – joined the Sharks for pre-season training prior to the 2014 Super Rugby season, but he later returned to the Kings without any involvement at the Durban-based franchise. He made just one appearance in the 2014 Vodacom Cup, scoring the EP Kings' only points in a 3–31 defeat to Free State XV in Cradock.

In June 2014, Whitehead was selected in the starting line-up for the Eastern Province Kings side to face Wales during a tour match during a 2014 incoming tour. He played the entire match and scored a last-minute conversion as the Kings suffered a 12–34 defeat.

Whitehead made four appearances in the 2014 Currie Cup Premier Division – the first time he played in this competition for five seasons – and scored five points as the Kings finished bottom of the log, with their only win of the season coming in their final match against the Pumas. Despite additional competition for the fly-half starting berth with the signings of Gary van Aswegen and Tony Jantjies, Whitehead was still named in their training squad for 2015 and he appeared in their opening match of the 2015 Vodacom Cup competition, a 19–27 loss to Griquas.

=== Griffons ===
Whitehead joined Welkom-based side the Griffons for the 2016 season.

=== Sharks ===
Whitehead joined Sharks on loan for a month during the 2025–26 United Rugby Championship, departing after the win over the Bulls.
