= James Tedder =

South African rugby union player

- Full name: James Tedder
- Born: 18 April 1997 (age 29) South Africa
- Height: 1.91 m (6 ft 3 in)
- Weight: 95 kg (14 st 13 lb; 209 lb)

Rugby union career
- Position: Fly-half
- Current team: Boland Cavaliers
Senior career
Years	Team	Apps	(Points)
2022	Golden Lions	6	(12)
2022	Lions		
2023– 2024	Albi		
- Correct as of 29 May 2022

James Tedder (born 18 April 1997) is a South African rugby union player for the Golden Lions in the Currie Cup. His regular position is fly-half.

Tedder was named in the Golden Lions side for the 2022 Currie Cup Premier Division. He made his Currie Cup debut for the Golden Lions against the Pumas in Round 2 of the 2022 Currie Cup Premier Division.
