= Nico Leonard =

Dutch YouTuber and businessman

- Born: Nico Leonard van der Horst; August 21, 1987 (age 38); Alphen aan de Rijn, Netherlands
- Occupations: YouTuber; businessman
- Spouse: Lauren Crozier
- Children: 2

YouTube information
- Channel: Nico Leonard
- Genres: Horology; Humor; vlog
- Subscribers: 2.07 million
- Views: 945 million
- Last updated: August, 2026

Nico Leonard van der Horst (born August 21, 1987), more commonly known as Nico Leonard, is a Dutch YouTuber, a watch expert or an enthusiast, and an entrepreneur credited with a genre of YouTube videos that centers on high-end watches, being the biggest watch-related YouTube channel and largest cross-platform creator regarding horology. Amongst other businesses, Leonard founded and owns luxury watch boutique Pride and Pinion, headquartered in Belfast.

== Early life ==
Van der Horst was born on August 21, 1987 in Alphen aan de Rijn and lived in Leiden. He was mainly raised in a middle-class household. He moved to Northern Ireland in 2013 to start working in a watch company. Leonard founded "Pride and Pinion" in 2019 and has been the director since. Leonard also founded, owns and directs clothing company GodTier, The Vault Competitions and The Watch Repair Centre

== YouTube career ==
=== Channel (2019–present) ===
Leonard's channel started as Pride and Pinion as an extension of his watch boutique in 2019 and later rebranded to Nico Leonard to depict his personal life in vlogs in a less formal manner. The channel surpassed 1 million subscribers in early 2023.

=== Outspokenness ===
Leonard became known for his informal tone, something that earned him a sizeable following yet some distance within members of the watch community. Leonard has been a vocal proponent of Casio ('God Tier') and an avid critic of Swiss brand Hublot.

== Personal life ==
Leonard is married and the couple has two children.
