= Malembe Mpofu =

South African rugby union player

- Full name: Malembe Mpofu
- Born: 15 February 1996 (age 30) South Africa
- Height: 1.95 m (6 ft 5 in)
- Weight: 115 kg (18 st 2 lb; 254 lb)

Rugby union career
- Position: Lock
- Current team: Pumas
Senior career
Years	Team	Apps	(Points)
2021	Leopards	7	(0)
2022–	Pumas	7	(0)
- Correct as of 10 July 2022

Malembe Mpofu is a South African rugby union player for the Pumas in the Currie Cup. His regular position is lock.

Mpofu was named in the Pumas side for the 2022 Currie Cup Premier Division. He made his Currie Cup debut for the Pumas against the Blue Bulls in Round 1 of the 2022 Currie Cup Premier Division.
