= Carel van der Merwe =

South African lawyer, naturalist, poet and writer

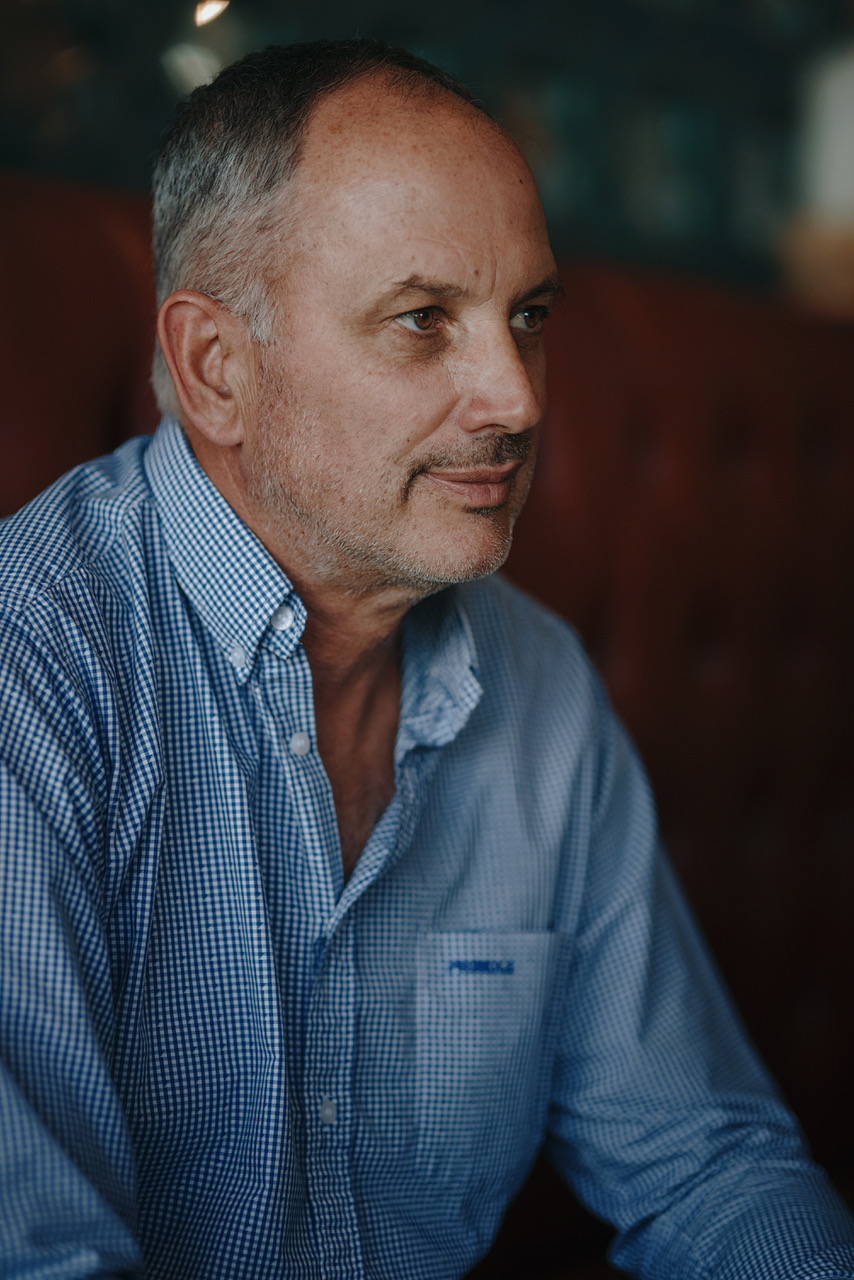
- Carel van der Merwe – Novelist, historian, businessman
- Born: Willem Carel van der Merwe; 7 September 1963 (age 62); Johannesburg, South Africa
- Education: University of Stellenbosh, University of Cape Town, Middlesex University
- Occupations: Novelist, historian, businessman
- Writing career
- Language: Afrikaans, English, German
- Notable awards: 2010: Eugène Marais Prize; 2016: KykNET-Rapport Prize (Non-fiction); 2016: SA Academy for Arts and Sciences (Protea Boekhuis Prize); 2017: SA Academy for Arts and Sciences (LW Hiemstra Prize); 2020: KykNET-Rapport Prize (Non-fiction); 2020: ATKV Prize (Non-fiction); 2022: SA Academy for Arts and Sciences (Protea Boekhuis Prize)

Carel van der Merwe is a South African author, historian and businessman who writes in Afrikaans and English. He has been awarded a number of literary prizes for his fiction and non-fiction books.

== Life and career ==
Van der Merwe was born on 7 September 1963 in Johannesburg. His father, Carel van der Merwe (1936–2016), was managing director of the Industrial Development Corporation of South Africa Ltd. During his youth Van der Merwe attended various schools in South Africa and Germany, and matriculated in 1981 at Linden High School in Johannesburg. Following his compulsory military service he studied at Stellenbosch University and the University of Cape Town, where he obtained undergraduate and post-graduate business degrees. He qualified as a chartered accountant, and worked for the international auditing firm Arthur Andersen & Co in Johannesburg and London until 1991.

In 1991 he joined Rand Merchant Bank Ltd in Johannesburg, and in 1995 he co-founded African Merchant Bank Ltd. In 2000 Van der Merwe relocated to London to serve as an executive director (mergers and acquisitions) of Comparex Limited, an international IT company. Whilst living in London he completed his part-time MA in Writing at Middlesex University, graduating with distinction in 2005. In 2006 relocated to Stellenbosch, South Africa's oldest town. He is currently chairman of the Stellenbosch Heritage Trust, which owns and manages a portfolio of historic buildings. He is also a director of AMB Capital Ltd, the successor of AMB. In 2018 he obtained a Phd in History at Stellenbosch University. He has two daughters, Mieke and Emma.

== Writing ==
Van der Merwe only started writing in his early forties. In 2004 he published his first short story, The Water Mountains, in a UK short story collection. In 2007 he published his debut novels, No Man's Land and Nasleep, written by him in English and Afrikaans respectively. No Man's Land was shortlisted for the Commonwealth Prize as well as the M-Net Literary Awards, and Nasleep for the UJ Literary Prize.

Van der Merwe also wrote his next novel in English and Afrikaans, and Shark and Geldwolf were published in 2009. Geldwolf was shortlisted for the M-Net Literary Awards (film category), and awarded the Eugène Marais Prize by the South African Academy for Arts and Science.

In 2012 his third novel was published, once again written by him English and Afrikaans, as Shadow and Skaduwee respectively.

In 2015 he published Donker Stroom - Eugène Marais en die Anglo-Boereoorlog, a biography of the famous South African poet and naturalist Eugène Marais. It was awarded the KykNET-Rapport Prize (non-fiction), as well as the Protea Boekhuis Prize and the L.W. Hiemstra Prize by the South African Academy for Arts and Sciences. It was also short-listed for the South African Literary Awards (non-fiction) award.

In 2019 Van der Merwe published Kansvatter: Die rustelose lewe van Ben Viljoen, a biography of Ben Viljoen, an enigmatic Boer War general. It was awarded the KykNET-Rapport Book prize (non-fiction), the ATKV Book prize (non-fiction), as well as the Protea Boekhuis Prize by the South African Academy for Arts and Sciences. It was also shortlisted for the South African Literary Awards (non-fiction) award.

In 2026 Van der Merwe published his fourth novel, Die Serwier, in Afrikaans. It is a literary thriller set in Serbia and South Africa. Major Viktor Vesić, a Serbian spy, is sent to South Africa to investigate the murder of a fellow agent. A reviewer stated that "this form of realism that so convincingly leads to blood and drama has something of John le Carré's espionage novels in its sinews."

== Works ==
| Title | Year | ISBN |
|---|---|---|
| No Man's Land | 2007 | 978-1-4152-0028-5 |
| Nasleep | 2007 | 978-1-4152-0029-2 |
| Nasleep - Dutch translation by Riet de Jong-Goossens | 2007 | 978-90-895-3040-0 |
| Shark | 2009 | 978-1-4152-0076-6 |
| Geldwolf | 2009 | 978-1-4152-0077-3 |
| Shadow | 2012 | 978-1-4152-0181-7 |
| Skaduwee | 2012 | 978-1-4152-0180-0 |
| Donker Stroom – Eugène Marais en die Anglo-Boereoorlog | 2015 | 978-0-624-07342-0 |
| Kansvatter - Die rustelose lewe van Ben Viljoen | 2019 | 1485310563 |
| Die Serwiër | 2026 | 978-0795803246 |

== Nominations and awards ==
Van der Merwe's books have been shortlisted for various literary awards such as the Commonwealth Writer's Prize, the South African Literary Awards Creative Non-Fiction Award, the UJ Literary Prize and the M-Net Literary Prize. He has also been awarded the following literary prizes:

| Year | Award | Book |
|---|---|---|
| 2010 | Eugène Marais Prize | Geldwolf |
| 2016 | KykNET-Rapport Book Prize (non-fiction) | Donker Stroom |
| 2016 | Protea Boekhuis Prize | Donker Stroom |
| 2017 | LW Hiemstra Prize | Donker Stroom |
| 2020 | KykNET-Rapport Book Prize (non-fiction) | Kansvatter |
| 2020 | ATKV Book Prize (non-fiction) | Kansvatter |
| 2022 | Protea Boekhuis Prize | Kansvatter |
