= Thomas Bursey =

South African rugby union player

- Full name: Thomas Bursey
- Born: 4 January 2000 (age 26) East London, South Africa
- Height: 1.80 m (5 ft 11 in)
- Weight: 80 kg (180 lb)
- School: Selborne College
- University: Stellenbosch University

Rugby union career
- Position: Scrum-half
- Current team: Western Province
Senior career
Years	Team	Apps	(Points)
2021–2024	Western Province	10	(10)
2021–2022	Stormers	1	(0)
2024–2025	Griquas	29	(0)
2025–present	Pumas	0	(0)
- Correct as of 16 September 2025

Thomas Bursey (born 4 January 2000) is a South African professional rugby union player for the Pumas in the Currie Cup. His regular position is scrum-half.

Bursey was named in the Western Province squad for the 2021 Currie Cup Premier Division. He made his debut for the Stormers against the British & Irish Lions during the 2021 British & Irish Lions tour to South Africa.
