= Bobby Alexander (footballer) =

Scottish footballer

Bobby Alexander was a Scottish footballer who played for Kilmarnock Amateurs, Troon, Kilmarnock and Hamilton Academical.

Alexander made his debut for Hamilton on 2 September 1964 against Ayr United, winning 1–0. He scored a hat-trick against Berwick Rangers on 23 September 1964. During his time at the Accies, he mainly played left wing, made 37 appearances and scored 13 goals.
