= Ig Prinsloo =

South African rugby union player

- Full name: Ignatius Michael Prinsloo
- Born: 4 April 1997 (age 29) South Africa
- Height: 1.90 m (6 ft 3 in)
- Weight: 139 kg (306 lb)

Rugby union career
- Position: Prop
- Current team: Pumas
Senior career
Years	Team	Apps	(Points)
2017–2018	Blue Bulls XV	3	(0)
2019–2020	Southern Kings	3	(0)
2020–	Pumas	29	(5)
- Correct as of 10 July 2022

Ignatius 'Ig' Michael Prinsloo (born 4 April 1997) is a South African rugby union player for the Southern Kings in the Pro14 . His regular position is prop.

Prinsloo made his Pro14 debut while for the Southern Kings in their match against the Cheetahs in January 2020, coming on as a replacement prop. He signed for the Kings Pro14 side for the 2019–20 Pro14.
