= Sam Francis (rugby union) =

South African rugby union player

- Full name: Samuel Francis
- Born: 14 March 2003 (age 23) South Africa
- Height: 190 cm (6 ft 3 in)
- Weight: 100 kg (220 lb; 15 st 10 lb)
- School: St. Andrew's College

Rugby union career
- Position: Fly-half
- Current team: Lions / Golden Lions
Senior career
Years	Team	Apps	(Points)
2024–	Golden Lions	12	(114)
2024–	Lions	8	(33)
- Correct as of 26 October 2026
International career
Years	Team	Apps	(Points)
2023	South Africa U20	1	(0)
- Correct as of 26 October 2025

Sam Francis (born 14 March 2003) is a South African rugby union player, who plays for the Lions and Golden Lions. His preferred position is fly-half.

== Early career ==
Francis attended St. Andrews College where he played for the first XV. His performances for the school earned him selection for the South Africa U20 side.

== Professional career ==
Francis signed for the Lions in 2022 as a junior player and represented their U21 side in 2024. He made his Currie Cup debut for the Golden Lions in the 2024 Currie Cup Premier Division, before debuting for the Lions in the 2024–25 EPCR Challenge Cup.
