= Griquas (rugby union) =

South African rugby union club, based in Kimberley, Northern Cape

(South Africa) Griquas
- Full name: Griquas
- Union: Griqualand West Rugby Union
- Nickname: Poubloues (Peacock Blues)
- Emblem: Oryx
- Founded: 1886; 140 years ago
- Region: Northern Cape Province, South Africa
- Ground: Griqua Park (Capacity: 11,000)
- Coach: Pieter Bergh
- Captain: Albert Liebenberg
- League(s): Currie Cup; SA Cup
- 2026 CC 2026 SA: Champions; 1st overall Runners-up; 1st overall
1st kit	2nd kit

Official website
- griquasrugby.co.za
- Current season

Griquas (Afrikaans: Griekwas), known as the Suzuki Griquas for sponsorship reasons, are a South African professional rugby union team based in Kimberley in Northern Cape, that participates in the annual Currie Cup tournament. Their home ground is Griqua Park in Kimberley and they draw their players mostly from Northern Cape Province. They have won the Currie Cup five times – in 1899, 1911, 1970, 2025 and 2026 – and the Vodacom Cup a joint-record five times.

== History ==
The rugby team was established in 1886 in the then British colony of Griqualand West. Five years later, during the 1891 British Lions tour to South Africa, Griqualand West played the British Lions in Kimberley. Although they lost 3–0, the British presented the team with the Currie Cup, as they thought that Griqualand West produced the best performance out of the provincial games on their tour. The Currie Cup became South Africa's domestic prize, and Griqualand West first won it in 1899. Griqualand West subsequently won the Currie Cup again in 1911. After the introduction of official annual championships in 1969, Griqualand West won the final the next season, defeating Northern Transvaal 11–9 to claim their third title. 55 years later, in 2025, Griquas won their fourth Currie Cup title.

The majority of Griquas supporters hail from the Northern Cape province of South Africa, most notably in and around Kimberley, where the team plays their home games. Their traditional rivals are Western Province, a rivalry that stems back to the earliest days of the Currie Cup, when Griqualand West were a dominant force in South African rugby. Since the 1970s, a friendly rivalry has also developed with neighbours the Free State Cheetahs in what has become known as the 'central derby'. Griquas are nicknamed the "Peacock Blues".

=== Super Rugby ===
In 2020, the Griquas were invited to play in the Super Rugby Unlocked competition. A list of players who represented the side in the competition can be found here.

== Current squad ==
The Griquas squad for the 2026 season is:

2026 Griquas squad
**Props**: (South Africa) Eddie Davids (Note: Addition for 2026 Currie Cup); (South Africa) Corné Lavagna; (South Africa) Johan Louw; (South Africa) Leon Lyons; (South Africa) Ebune Ngundue; (South Africa) Ig Prinsloo; (South Africa) Ntobeko Shezi; **Hookers**: (South Africa) Keagan Blanckenberg; (South Africa) Dandrè Delport; (South Africa) Tiaan Lange; (South Africa) Janco Uys; (South Africa) Janus Venter (Note: Addition for 2026 Currie Cup); **Locks**: (South Africa) Athenkosi Khethani; (South Africa) Albert Liebenberg **(c)**; (South Africa) Lungi Mbiko; (South Africa) Malembe Mpofu; (South Africa) Derik Pretorius	**Loose forwards**: (South Africa) Marco de Witt; (South Africa) Carl Els; (South Africa) Gustav Erlank; (South Africa) Phumzile Maqondwana; (South Africa) Lourens Oosthuizen; (South Africa) Dillon Smith (Note: Addition for 2026 Currie Cup); (South Africa) Carel van der Merwe; (South Africa) Jac van der Walt; **Scrum-halves**: (South Africa) Caleb Abrahams; (South Africa) Bobby Alexander; (South Africa) Jack Hart; **Fly-halves**: (South Africa) Liam Koen; (South Africa) Zinedine Robinson; (South Africa) George Whitehead	**Centres**: (South Africa) Zane Bester; (South Africa) Damian Markus; (South Africa) Tom Nel; (South Africa) Mnombo Zwelendaba; **Wingers**: (South Africa) Stefan Coetzee (Note: Addition for 2026 Currie Cup); (South Africa) Dylan Maart; (South Africa) Sako Makata; (South Africa) Gurshwin Wehr; **Fullbacks**: (South Africa) Cameron Hufke; (South Africa) Connor Mahoney
**(c)** denotes the team captain. **Bold** denotes internationally capped players. * denotes players qualified to play for South Africa on residency or dual nationality. Source:

== Honours ==
=== Major Honours ===
- Currie Cup Premier Division
  - Champions: (5) 1899, 1911, 1970, 2025, 2026
  - Runners-up: (1) 2022
- SA Cup
  - Champions: (1) 2024
  - Runners-up: (2) 2025, 2026
- Vodacom Cup
  - Champions: (5) 1998, 2005, 2007, 2009, 2014
  - Runners-up: (3) 1999, 2000, 2012
- Supersport Rugby Challenge
  - Champions: (1) 2019
  - Runners-up: (2) 2017, 2018
- Vodacom Shield
  - Runners-up: (1) 2003

=== Minor Honours ===
- Airlink Cup 2023

== Finals ==
=== Currie Cup ===
Griquas have won the Currie Cup four times, and have been losing finalists once:

Season	Winners	Score	Runner-up	Venue
1899^{1}	Griqualand West	n/a	n/a	n/a
1911	Griqualand West	n/a	n/a	n/a
1970	Griqualand West	11–9	Northern Transvaal	De Beers Stadium, Kimberley
2022	Pumas	26-19	Griquas	Griqua Park, Kimberley
2025	Griquas	27–25	Golden Lions	Ellis Park Stadium, Johannesburg
2026	Griquas	23–16	Pumas	Griqua Park, Kimberley

^{1} Western Province and Transvaal did not compete.

They were defeated in the semi-finals in 1979, 1998, 2019 and 2021.

=== Vodacom Cup ===
Griquas have won the Vodacom Cup five times, and been defeated in the final three times. This makes them the most successful rugby union in the competition.

Season	Winners	Score	Runner-up	Venue
1998	Griquas	57–0	Golden Lions	Kimberley
1999	Golden Lions	73-7	Griquas	Johannesburg
2000	Cheetahs	44-24	Griquas	Bloemfontein
2005	Griquas	27–25	Leopards	Kimberley
2007	Griquas	33–29	Blue Bulls	Kimberley
2009	Griquas	28–19	Blue Bulls	Loftus Versfeld, Pretoria
2012	Western Province	20-18	Griquas	Griqua Park, Kimberley
2014	Griquas	30–6	Golden Lions	Griqua Park, Kimberley

=== Supersport Rugby Challenge ===
The Griquas have won the Supersport Challenge once and have lost twice in finals. In the short run that this competition was active, the Griquas also boast the best record of all rugby unions.

Rugby Challenge finals
Season	Winner	Score	Runner-Up
2017	Western Province	28–19	Griquas
2018	Pumas	32–30	Griquas
2019	Griquas	28–13	Pumas

=== SA Cup ===
Griquas have won the SA Cup once and have been defeated in the final twice.

Season	Winners	Score	Runner-up	Venue
2024	Griquas	46–24	Pumas	Kimberley
2025	Pumas	14-39	Griquas	Mbombela
2026	Pumas	35-38	Griquas	Kimberley
