= Willie Engelbrecht =

South African rugby union player

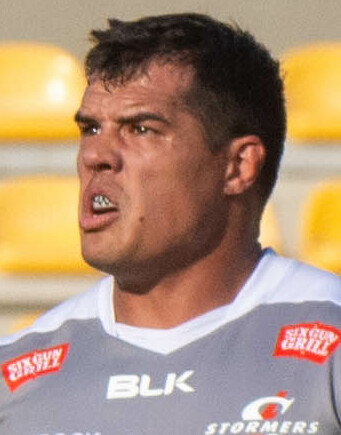
- Full name: Willem Gerhardus Engelbrecht
- Born: 24 July 1992 (age 34) Pretoria, South Africa
- Height: 1.90 m (6 ft 3 in)
- Weight: 108 kg (238 lb; 17 st 0 lb)
- School: Hoërskool Die Wilgers
- University: University of Pretoria

Rugby union career
- Position: Flanker
- Current team: Stormers / Western Province
Youth career
- 2012: Falcons
- 2013: Limpopo Blue Bulls
Senior career
Years	Team	Apps	(Points)
2015	Limpopo Blue Bulls	7	(7)
2017–2022	Pumas	77	(75)
2018	→ Lions	0	(0)
2021–2022	→ Stormers	10	(0)
2022–	Stormers		
2023–	Western Province		
- Correct as of 23 July 2022

Wille Gerhardus Engelbrecht (born 24 July 1992) is a South African rugby union player for the Pumas in the Currie Cup and Rugby Challenge. His regular position is flanker.

Willie was included in the Lions squad as a loan player for the 2018 Super Rugby season. However he did not play any games that season before returning to the Pumas.

In 2021 he joined the Stormers on loan. He played 5 games in the Pro14 Rainbow Cup and 5 games in the United Rugby Championship before returning to the Pumas for the 2022 Currie Cup season.

On 27 May 2022 it was announced that and signed for the Stormers on a two-year deal.
