= Nevaldo Fleurs =

South African rugby union player

- Full name: Nevaldo Fleurs
- Born: 5 December 1999 (age 26) Cradock, Eastern Cape, South Africa
- Height: 1.82 m (5 ft 11 1/2 in)
- Weight: 90 kg (14 st 2 lb; 198 lb)

Rugby union career
- Position: Fly-half / Fullback
- Current team: Sharks / Sharks (Currie Cup)
Youth career
- 2018–2022: Maties
Senior career
Years	Team	Apps	(Points)
2022–	Sharks (Currie Cup)	3	(0)
2022–	Sharks	2	(2)
- Correct as of 16 March 2023

Nevaldo Fleurs (born 5 December 1999) is a South African rugby union player for the Sharks in the Currie Cup. His regular position is fly-half or fullback.

== Career ==
Fleurs was a mid-season addition to the Sharks side for the 2022 Currie Cup Premier Division. He signed for the Sharks after an impressive Varsity Cup season, during which he scoring 118 points, including six penalties in the final. He made his Currie Cup debut for the Sharks against the Pumas in Round 10 of the 2022 Currie Cup Premier Division.
