= Jay-Cee Nel =

South African rugby union player

- Full name: Jay-Cee Nel
- Born: 7 January 1999 (age 27) South Africa
- Height: 1.92 m (6 ft 3 1/2 in)
- Weight: 100 kg (220 lb)

Rugby union career
- Position: Centre
- Current team: Bulls / Griquas
Senior career
| Years | Team | Apps | (Points) |
| 2019 | Blue Bulls XV | 3 | (2) |
| 2020 | Blue Bulls | 2 | (0) |
| 2021– | Bulls | 0 | (0) |
| 2021– | Griquas | 5 | (10) |
- Correct as of 10 July 2022
International career
| Years | Team | Apps | (Points) |
| 2024- | Namibia | 5 | (5) |

Jay-Cee Nel (born 7 January 1999) is a South African-born Namibian international rugby union player, who plays his club rugby for the Griquas in the Currie Cup. His regular position is centre.

Nel was named in the Blue Bulls side for their Round 5 match of the 2020–21 Currie Cup Premier Division against the Golden Lions. He made his debut in the same fixture, starting the match at inside centre.

Nel made his international debut for Namibia in their 2024 mid-year loss to Portugal. He then played in the Welwitchias' 2024 and 2025 campaigns, scoring his first try in his team's 30-28 loss to Zimbabwe in the final of the latter.
