= Jack Hart (rugby union) =

South African rugby union player

- Full name: Jack Jacobus Hart
- Born: 13 February 1998 (age 28) Johannesburg, South Africa
- Height: 1.78 m (5 ft 10 in)
- Weight: 76 kg (168 lb; 12 st 0 lb)
- School: Afrikaanse Hoër Seunskool, Pretoria

Rugby union career
- Position: Scrum-half
- Current team: Golden Lions XV
Youth career
- 2014–2016: Blue Bulls
- 2017–2019: Golden Lions
Senior career
Years	Team	Apps	(Points)
2017	Golden Lions	1	(0)
2019	Golden Lions XV	2	(0)
2021	Falcons	2	(5)
- Correct as of 27 March 2022
International career
Years	Team	Apps	(Points)
2018	South Africa Under-20	1	(0)
- Correct as of 18 June 2018

Jack Jacobus Hart (born 13 February 1998) is a South African rugby union player for the Golden Lions XV in the Rugby Challenge. His regular position is scrum-half.

In 2017, he was nominated as the Lions Under 19 Backline Player of the Year.
