= Cohen Jasper =

South African rugby union player

- Full name: Cohen Jasper
- Born: 20 June 2000 (age 26) Swellendam, South Africa
- Height: 1.74 m (5 ft 8 1/2 in)
- Weight: 77 kg (170 lb)

Rugby union career
- Position: Fullback
- Current team: Cheetahs / Free State Cheetahs
Senior career
Years	Team	Apps	(Points)
2021–	Free State Cheetahs	13	(20)
2021–	Cheetahs		
- Correct as of 10 July 2022

Cohen Jasper (born 20 June 2000) is a South African rugby union player for the Free State Cheetahs. His regular position is fullback.

Jasper was named in the Free State Cheetahs squad for the 2021 Currie Cup Premier Division. He made his debut for the in Round 2 of the 2021 Currie Cup Premier Division against the Griquas.
