= JJ Scheepers =

South African rugby union player

- Full name: Jonathan J Scheepers
- Born: March 20, 1998 (age 28) Gauteng, South Africa
- Height: 198 cm (6 ft 6 in)
- Weight: 115 kg (254 lb)

Rugby union career
- Position: Lock
Youth career
- 2016-2019: Blue Bulls
Senior career
Years	Team	Apps	(Points)
2019	Falcons	1	(0)
2021	CUS Perugia Rugby		
2021	Blue Bulls	1	(0)
2021-2022	Naka Bulls		
2022-2023	Promotica Centurioni		
2023	San Clemente Rhinos	4	(0)
2024-2025	OK Financial Group Okman		
2025–2026	Pumas	10	(30)
2025	Sharks	2	(0)
2026–	Sale Sharks		(0)
- Correct as of 17 April 2026

JJ Scheepers is a South African rugby union player for the Sharks in the URC. His regular position is lock. He has previously played for the Falcons, Blue Bulls, Naka Bulls, in South Africa, as well as Italian side CUS Perugia Rugby and Promotica Centurioni, and Mexican/American side San Clemente Rhinos.

== Career ==
Scheepers was named in the Blue Bulls squad for the 2021 Currie Cup Premier Division. He made his debut in Round 1 of the 2021 Currie Cup Premier Division against the Western Province.

Scheepers joined OK Financial Group Okman in early 2024, representing the team on Netflix’s rugby competition series Rugged Rugby: Conquer or Die.

Scheepers later signed for the Pumas, where he made a majority of appearances during the 2025 Currie Cup season.

Scheepers signed to the Sharks on a short-term deal and made his debut in the 2025-2026 United Rugby Championship.

On 16 April 2026, Scheepers moves to England to sign for Sale Sharks on a two-year deal in the Premiership Rugby competition from the 2026-27 season.
