= SWD Eagles =

(South Africa) SWD Eagles
- Full name: South Western Districts Eagles
- Union: South Western Districts Rugby Union
- Emblem: Eagle
- Founded: 1899
- Region: Eastern part of Western Cape, South Africa
- Ground: Outeniqua Park (Capacity: 7,500)
- Coach: Heyneke Meyer
- League(s): Currie Cup First Division; SA Cup
- 2026 CC 2026 SA: Champions; 1st 5th
Team kit	2nd kit

Official website
- www.swdarende.co.za
- Current season

The South Western Districts Eagles are a South African rugby union team that participates in the annual Currie Cup and Vodacom Cup tournament. They represent the Southern Cape (Garden Route & Klein Karoo regions) and play out of Outeniqua Park in George.

== History ==
The South Western Districts Rugby Football Union was established in 1899. Initially, home matches were held in Mossel Bay, Oudtshoorn and George, but in 1996, the SWDRFU made Outeniqua Park in George its home base.

They have never won the Currie Cup, but they did win the Bankfin Cup in 2002 and the Currie Cup First Division in 2002, 2007, 2018 and 2026. They also reached the semi-finals of the Currie Cup in their centenary season in 1999 under Heyneke Meyer.

== Honours ==
- Currie Cup First Division champions: 2002, 2007, 2018, 2026
- Currie Cup First Division Runner-up: 2009, 2010, 2015
- Vodacom Shield Runner-up 2004
- Mzansi Challenge Runner-up 2023

== Sevens ==
The SWDRFU also hosted the South Africa Sevens leg of the IRB Sevens World Series for several seasons at Outeniqua Park. In 2012, they also launched the 7s Premier League tournament in 2012 held at the same venue.
