= Griffons (rugby union) =

South African rugby union team

- Full name: Griffons
- Union: Griffons Rugby Union
- Emblem: Griffon
- Founded: 1968
- Region: Part of the Free State Province, South Africa
- Ground(s): North West Stadium, Welkom (Capacity: 17,000)
- Coach: Jacques Juries
- League(s): Currie Cup First Division; SA Cup
- 2026 CC 2026 SA: 5th 8th
Team kit

Official website
- griffonsrugby.co.za
- Current season

The Griffons, currently known as the Novavit Griffons for sponsorship reasons, are a South African rugby union team that participates in the annual Currie Cup and SA Cup tournaments. They play out of Welkom at North West Stadium, and draw players from roughly the eastern third of Free State Province (the remainder of the province comprises the territory of the Free State Cheetahs).

== History ==
The Griffons rugby union was formed in 1968 when the late Dr Danie Craven, the president of SA rugby, had a vision to spread the game to rural areas in South Africa. The Griffons were one of four new provincial teams formed, originally known as Northern Free State (or Noord Vrystaat in Afrikaans).

In 1996, with the start of professional rugby, the then South African rugby football union, under Louis Luyt, decided to re-divide the unions to have only 14 provinces in South Africa, with Northern Free State being one. The Eastern Free State province was incorporated into Northern Free State. In 1999, Northern Free State changed their name to the Griffons.

Their top scorer was Eric Herbert, who score 2608 points for Northern Free State from 1986 to 2001. Herbert later coached the Griffons.

== Honours ==
The team's major tournament wins include:

- Currie Cup First Division: 2008, 2014, 2016, 2017, 2022, 2025
- Vodacom Cup: 2001 Vodacom Shield
- Paul Roos Trophy: 1970

=== Minor honours ===
- Toyota Challenge: runner up 2024
