= Ruwald van der Merwe =

- Born: 29 July 1998 (age 28) Rustenburg, South Africa
- Height: 1.89 m (6 ft 2 in)
- Weight: 110 kg (243 lb; 17 st 5 lb)
- School: Vastrap Primary School / Rustenburg High School
- University: University of the Free State

Rugby union career
- Position: Flanker / Number 8
Amateur team(s)
Years	Team	Apps	(Points)
-	UFS Shimlas		
Senior career
Years	Team	Apps	(Points)
2022–26	Pumas		
2026–	Glasgow Warriors	1	(0)

Ruwald van der Merwe (born 29 July 1998) is a South African rugby union player. He plays for Glasgow Warriors.

== Rugby Union career ==
=== Amateur career ===
Van Der Merwe started playing rugby at Vastrap Primary School, before joining the school side at Rustenburg High School. He was spotted by Melusi Mthethwa, now South Africa's Under 20 coach, and was offered a bursary at the University of Free State where he could continue his rugby development.

He played for the University of the Free State rugby team, the FNB UFS Shimlas. He played in the Varsity Cup matches for the university side.

=== Professional career ===
He joined the Pumas in 2022. A year later the Pumas were in the Currie Cup final. In 2025, he captained the Pumas side to win the Currie Cup.

On 31 March 2026 Glasgow Warriors announced they had signed Van Der Merwe on a two year deal starting the season 2026-27. Prior to his signing it was revealed that he called the one time Warriors stalwart and fan favourite Henco Venter. Venter said 'I told him he must take it with both hands. It will be the best decision for his rugby career and in his life.' Van Der Merwe revealed that Venter: 'had nothing but great things to say about the club and life in Glasgow'.

He made his competitive debut for the Warriors in the European Champions Cup match against Sale Sharks on 17 October 2026. He became Glasgow Warrior No. 380. The Warriors ran in 7 tries, with a bonus point win against the English side.
