= De Wet Marais =

South African rugby union player

- Full name: De Wet Marais
- Born: 26 May 2000 (age 26) South Africa
- Height: 1.90 m (6 ft 3 in)
- School: Grey College, Bloemfontein

Rugby union career
- Position: Flanker
Senior career
Years	Team	Apps	(Points)
2021	Western Province	1	(0)
- Correct as of 14 January 2022

De Wet Marais (born 26 May 2000) is a South African rugby union player for the Western Province in the Currie Cup. His regular position is flanker.

Marais was named in the Western Province squad for the 2021 Currie Cup Premier Division. He made his debut for Western Province in Round 2 of the 2021 Currie Cup Premier Division against Golden Lions.
