= Tiaan de Klerk =

Namibia international rugby union player

- Full name: Tiaan de Klerk
- Born: 12 June 2001 (age 25) Namibia
- Height: 204 cm (6 ft 8 in)
- Weight: 108 kg (238 lb; 17 st 0 lb)
- University: University of Pretoria

Rugby union career
- Position: Lock
- Current team: Mogliano
Youth career
- UP Tuks
Senior career
Years	Team	Apps	(Points)
2021−2022	Blue Bulls	1	(0)
2022−2023	Mogliano	6	(0)
- Correct as of 13 January 2022
International career
Years	Team	Apps	(Points)
2023–	Namibia	1	(0)

Tiaan de Klerk (born 12 June 2001) is a Namibian rugby union player for the Mogliano in the Italian Top10. His regular position is lock.

De Klerk was named in the Blue Bulls squad for the 2021 Currie Cup Premier Division. He made his debut in Round 1 of the 2021 Currie Cup Premier Division against the Western Province.

On 20 July 2023, he was named in Namibia 35-player squad was named for tour to South America for their 2023 Rugby World Cup warm-up matches.
