= Leopards (rugby union) =

- Full name: North West Leopards
- Union: Leopards Rugby Union
- Emblem: Leopard
- Founded: 1920
- Region: North West Province
- Ground(s): Olën Park, Potchefstroom (Capacity: 22,000)
- Coach: Riaan van Straten
- League(s): Currie Cup First Division; SA Cup
- 2026 CC 2026 SA: Semi-finalist; 4th 9th
Team kit

Official website
- www.leopardsrugby.com
- Current season

The Leopards (Afrikaans: Luiperds) is a South African professional rugby union team that participates in the First Division of the Currie Cup, as well as the SA Cup. They are based in the North West Province. Their home ground is Olën Park in Potchefstroom. The union was formed in 1920 and was originally called Western Transvaal.

== History ==
The Western Transvaal Rugby Union had its origin in the Transvaal Rugby Union in 1920, when it became the tenth member of senior rugby unions forming the South African rugby landscape. For most of their history they've played in the second tier of the Currie Cup, but they were promoted to the Premier Division for the 2009 season after defeating the Falcons in a promotion-relegation playoff in October 2008. They remained in the Premier Division of the Currie Cup until the end of 2011 season after beating the SWD Eagles from the Southern Cape in the promotion/relegation matches at the end of 2009 and 2010. However, the South African Rugby Union (SARU) reduced the number of teams in the Premier Division of the Currie Cup from the 2012, and the Leopards moved down to the First Division.

They became the first black-owned rugby team in South Africa after securing sponsorship from Royal Bafokeng Sports Holdings in October 2007.

The Leopards are based primarily in the university town of Potchefstroom, but have played some home games at the much larger Royal Bafokeng Stadium in Rustenburg as well as at other rugby clubs around the province. They draw their fans from across the North West Province and used to average crowds of 5,000 to home Currie Cup fixtures.

== Honours ==
- Currie Cup First Division champions 2015, 2021
- W.V. Simkins Trophy winners 1991, 1992
