= Border Bulldogs =

South African rugby union club, based in East London

(South Africa) Border Bulldogs
- Full name: Border Bulldogs
- Union: Border Rugby Union
- Emblem: Bulldog
- Founded: 1891; 135 years ago
- Region: Eastern third of the Eastern Cape, South Africa
- Ground: Buffalo City Stadium (Capacity: 16,000)
- Coach: Dumisani Mhani
- League(s): Currie Cup First Division; SA Cup
- 2026 CC 2026 SA: 6th 10th
Team kit

Official website
- www.borderbulldogs.co.za
- Current season

The Border Bulldogs (Grens Bulldogs) is a South African professional rugby union team based in East London that participates in the annual Currie Cup competitions. They are governed by the Border Rugby Union (BRU).

== History ==
The Border Rugby Football Union governs rugby in the eastern third of the Eastern Cape province, including two former homelands, Transkei and Ciskei. The team is based in East London and play at the Buffalo City Stadium. They form part of the Southern Kings Super Rugby franchise.

Border were one of the founding members of the Currie Cup, having been established in 1891, but have only won the prestigious competition twice, in 1932 and 1934. They also won the Vodacom Shield in 2003.

In 1995, following the introduction professionalism in rugby, the team adopted the nickname the Bulldogs. The team have struggled since they were relegated to the Currie Cup First Division in 2000, never being promoted to the Premier Division.

=== In-fighting and financial crisis ===
In 2013, a dispute arose between the Border Rugby Union and the Border Rugby (Pty) Ltd, the professional arm of the BRFU which administers the Bulldogs. The dispute was in relation to a perceived lack of transformation at the Bulldogs, who claimed local amateur black players were not good enough for the professional side. As a result, in June of that year, the BRFU refused to release any of their club players to play for the Bulldogs. In September and October, television broadcasting money paid by SARU to the BRFU was not given to the Bulldogs, resulting in players' salaries not being paid, coach Paul Flanagan leaving and the Border Academy being shut down. At the start of 2014, the BRFU announced that it was bankrupt. In March 2014, the South African Rugby Union withdrew their financial support due to a lack of audited financial records. It culminated in the South African Rugby Union taking control of the team's financial and administrative affairs in December 2014, with the intention of handing control back to BRFU officials once the situation has been normalised.

The suspension was lifted in 2022.

=== Honours ===
Vodacom Shield

- champions 2003 Vodacom Shield

Bankfin Nite Series

- runner-up 1996

Currie Cup

- Champions 1932 (shared), 1934 (shared)

== See also ==
- Southern Kings
