= Stephan Geldenhuys =

South African Rugby Union Referee

- Full name: Hermanus Stephan Geldenhuys
- Born: 18 January 1984 (age 42) South Africa
- School: Hoër Landbouskool Boland

Rugby union career
Refereeing career
Years	Competition	Apps
2022–present	Currie Cup	1

Stephan Geldenhuys (born 18 January 1984) is a rugby union referee, currently on the South African Rugby Union's National Panel.

== Career ==
Geldenhuys began refereeing in 2007, joining the SA Rugby Union's National panel in 2013, and named on an updated panel in 2018. In 2019, he refereed the Dubai Invitational tournament. He made his Currie Cup Premier Division refereeing debut in Round 12 of the 2022 Currie Cup Premier Division, officiating the match between the Golden Lions and Western Province.
