= Bobby Alexander (rugby union) =

South African rugby union player

- Full name: Dylan Alexander
- Born: South Africa

Rugby union career
- Position: Scrum-half
- Current team: Griquas
Senior career
Years	Team	Apps	(Points)
2022	Western Province	4	(5)
2023–	Griquas		
- Correct as of 23 July 2022

Bobby Alexander is a South African rugby union player for the Western Province in the Currie Cup. His regular position is scrum-half.

Alexander was named in the Western Province side for the 2022 Currie Cup Premier Division. He made his Currie Cup debut for the Western Province against the Blue Bulls in Round 8 of the 2022 Currie Cup Premier Division.
