= 2000 Currie Cup qualification =

Domestic rugby union competition

2000 Currie Cup Qualification

The 2000 Currie Cup Qualification tournament was the first stage of the 2000 Currie Cup season, the 62nd season of the competition since it started in 1889. Following this tournament, eight teams qualified for the 2000 Currie Cup Top 8 competition, and six teams for the 2000 Bankfin Cup competition.

== Competition ==
There were fourteen participating teams in the 2000 Currie Cup qualification tournament. They were divided into two sections, Section X and Section Y. Each team played every other team in their section once. The top four teams in each of the two sections qualified for the 2000 Currie Cup Top 8. Only points earned against other Top 8 qualifiers during the preliminary rounds were carried forward to the Top 8. The eight teams in the Top 8 played for the Currie Cup, and the three bottom-placed teams in the section qualified for the second-tier 2000 Bankfin Cup.

All points earned against the other qualifying teams from the same competition were carried forward into the next competition.

Teams received four points for a win and two points for a draw. Bonus points were awarded to teams that scored four or more tries in a game, as well as to teams that lost a match by seven points or less. The ranking position of each team was first determined by total log points, then by point difference (match points scored minus match points conceded).

== Section X ==
Location of teams in 2000 Currie Cup qualification Section X

=== Team Listing ===
2000 Currie Cup qualification Section X teams
Team	Sponsored Name	Stadium/s	Sponsored Name
Boland Cavaliers	Boland Cavaliers	Boland Stadium, Wellington	Boland Stadium
Falcons	Falcons	Bosman Stadium, Brakpan	Bosman Stadium
Free State Cheetahs	Free State Cheetahs	Free State Stadium, Bloemfontein	Free State Stadium
Golden Lions	Golden Lions	Ellis Park Stadium, Johannesburg	Ellis Park Stadium
Griffons	Griffons	North West Stadium, Welkom	North West Stadium
Mighty Elephants	Mighty Elephants	Boet Erasmus Stadium, Port Elizabeth	Telkom Park
Sharks	Sharks	Kings Park Stadium, Durban	Absa Stadium

=== Log ===
2000 Currie Cup qualification Section X Log
Pos	Team	Pld	W	D	L	PF	PA	PD	TF	TA	TB	LB	Pts	CF	Qualification
1	Sharks	6	5	0	1	213	141	+72	24	11	4	1	25	11	2000 Currie Cup Top 8
2	Golden Lions	6	3	1	2	283	207	+76	36	29	6	1	21	9	2000 Currie Cup Top 8
3	Boland Cavaliers	6	4	0	2	190	174	+16	29	22	4	1	21	6	2000 Currie Cup Top 8
4	Free State Cheetahs	6	3	1	2	195	187	+8	21	22	4	1	19	8	2000 Currie Cup Top 8
5	Mighty Elephants	6	3	0	3	164	172	−8	24	21	4	0	16	10	2000 Bankfin Cup
6	Falcons	6	2	0	4	174	225	−51	22	31	4	1	13	5	2000 Bankfin Cup
7	Griffons	6	0	0	6	196	309	−113	21	41	3	2	5	1	2000 Bankfin Cup

Rules for classification: 4 points for a win; 2 points for a draw; 1 bonus point for a loss by seven points or less; 1 bonus point for scoring four or more tries in a match

=== Results ===
==== Round One ====
22 July 2000	Mighty Elephants	34–12	Falcons	Boet Erasmus Stadium, Port Elizabeth
	Try: Rhys Botha; Barry Pinnock; Wonga Joka (3); Con: Graeme Bouwer (3); Pen: Richard Jordaan	Scoreboard; Report	Try: Eugene Meyer; Piet Matthys; Con: Pieter Jordaan

22 July 2000	Griffons	38–43	Free State Cheetahs	Goble Stadium, Bethlehem
	Try: Jaco Gouws; Gielie de Swart; Con: Eric Herbert (2); Pen: Eric Herbert (5); Drop: Eric Herbert (3)	Scoreboard; Report	Try: MJ Smith; Michael Horak (2); Jimmy Powell; Con: Kennedy Tsimba (4); Pen: Kennedy Tsimba (5)

22 July 2000	Boland Cavaliers	46–30	Golden Lions	Boland Stadium, Wellington
	Try: Wayne Julies; John Daniels (2); Heino Senekal; Lean van Dyk; Chris Potgieter; Quinn Hough; Con: Lean van Dyk (2); Riaan van Jaarsveld; Antonius Verhoeven; Pen: Lean van Dyk	Scoreboard; Report	Try: Jaco Booysen; Russel Winter; Johan Ackerman; Conrad Jantjes; Con: André Pretorius (2); Pen: André Pretorius (2)

Bye/s: Sharks

==== Round Two ====
29 July 2000	Sharks	46–37	Griffons	Kings Park Stadium, Durban
	Try: Trevor Halstead (2); Charl van Rensburg; Dewald Femboes; Stefan Terblanche; Con: Gaffie du Toit (3); Pen: Gaffie du Toit (5)	Scoreboard; Report	Try: Ricardo Arnolds; Renier de Jager; Charl Blom; Con: Eric Herbert (2); Pen: Eric Herbert (6)

29 July 2000	Free State Cheetahs	37–19	Boland Cavaliers	Free State Stadium, Bloemfontein
	Try: Wylie Human; MJ Smith; Friedrich Lombard; Jaco Coetzee; Con: Kennedy Tsimba (4); Pen: Kennedy Tsimba (3)	Scoreboard; Report	Try: Martin Stander (2); Randile Julies; Con: Antonius Verhoeven (2)

29 July 2000	Golden Lions	38–22	Mighty Elephants	Ellis Park Stadium, Johannesburg
	Try: Walter Minnaar (2); Grant Esterhuizen; Dean Hall; Conrad Jantjes; Con: Louis Koen (2); Pen: Louis Koen (2); Drop: Louis Koen	Scoreboard; Report	Try: Chad Alcock (3); Johan de Kock; Con: Rhys Botha

Bye/s: Falcons

==== Round Three ====
4 August 2000	Mighty Elephants	24–18	Free State Cheetahs	Boet Erasmus Stadium, Port Elizabeth
	Try: Ricardo Loubser; Rhys Botha; Chad Alcock; Wonga Joka; Con: Graeme Bouwer; Rhys Botha	Scoreboard; Report	Try: Braam Els; Gerrie Britz; Con: Kennedy Tsimba; Pen: Kennedy Tsimba (2)

4 August 2000	Boland Cavaliers	13–18	Sharks	Boland Stadium, Wellington
	Try: Marius Joubert; Con: Antonius Verhoeven; Pen: Antonius Verhoeven (2)	Scoreboard; Report	Try: Gaffie du Toit (2); Con: Gaffie du Toit; Pen: Gaffie du Toit (2)	Referee: Carl Spannenberg

5 August 2000	Falcons	43–42	Golden Lions	Bosman Stadium, Brakpan
	Try: Tertius Douw (2); Joe Esterhuyzen (2); Jean Pieters; Con: Louis van Rensburg (3); Pen: Louis van Rensburg (3); Pieter Jordaan	Scoreboard; Report	Try: Dean Hall (2); Chester Williams; Grant Esterhuizen; Thinus Delport; Con: Louis Koen (4); Pen: Louis Koen (3)	Referee: Andy Turner

Bye/s: Griffons

==== Round Four ====
11 August 2000	Free State Cheetahs	48–27	Falcons	Free State Stadium, Bloemfontein
	Try: JP du Toit; Jimmy Powell; Gerrie Britz; Braam Els (2); Kennedy Tsimba; Con: Kennedy Tsimba (3); Pen: Kennedy Tsimba (4)	Scoreboard; Report	Try: Pieter Jordaan; Bertus Heunis; Ralph Schroeder; Freddy Roberts; Con: Pieter Jordaan (2); Pen: Pieter Jordaan	Referee: Carl Spannenberg

12 August 2000	Griffons	36–40	Boland Cavaliers	North West Stadium, Welkom
15:15	Try: Renier de Jager; Willie Nagel; Gerrie Britz; Neil Goosen; Louis van Straaten; Marcel van der Walt; Con: Eric Herbert (4); Pen: Eric Herbert	Scoreboard; Report	Try: John Daniels (2); Marius Joubert (2); Antonius Verhoeven; Stanley Raubenheimer; Con: Lean van Dyk (4); Antonius Verhoeven	Referee: Andy Turner

12 August 2000	Sharks	29–15	Mighty Elephants	Kings Park Stadium, Durban
15:00	Try: Stefan Terblanche; Rob Linde; Charl van Rensburg; Con: Gaffie du Toit; Pen: Gaffie du Toit (3); Drop: Stefan Terblanche	Scoreboard; Report	Try: Johan de Kock (2); Con: Graeme Bouwer; Pen: Graeme Bouwer	Referee: Mark Lawrence

Bye/s: Golden Lions

==== Round Five ====
1 September 2000	Falcons	22–43	Sharks	Bosman Stadium, Brakpan
	Try: Adrian Jacobs; Con: Pieter Jordaan; Pen: Pieter Jordaan (5)	Scoreboard; Report	Try: Deon Kayser; Stefan Terblanche; Trevor Halstead; AJ Venter; Albert van den Berg; Con: Gaffie du Toit (3); Pen: Gaffie du Toit (4)

2 September 2000	Free State Cheetahs	37–37	Golden Lions	Free State Stadium, Bloemfontein
15:10	Try: De Wet Oelschig; Dirkie Groenewalt; Kennedy Tsimba; Friedrich Lombard; Tokkie Kasselman; Con: Kennedy Tsimba (3); Pen: Kennedy Tsimba (2)	Scoreboard; Report	Try: Japie Mulder (2); Thinus Delport; Delarey du Preez; Con: Louis Koen (4); Pen: Louis Koen (2); Drop: Louis Koen	Referee: André Watson

2 September 2000	Mighty Elephants	48–37	Griffons	Boet Erasmus Stadium, Port Elizabeth
	Try: Henry Pedro (3); Wonga Joka (2); Johan de Kock; Con: André Fourie (6); Pen: André Fourie (2)	Scoreboard; Report	Try: Eric Herbert (2); Willie Nagel; Con: Eric Herbert (2); Pen: Eric Herbert (5); Drop: Eric Herbert

Bye/s: Boland Cavaliers

==== Round Six ====
9 September 2000	Golden Lions	42–35	Sharks	Ellis Park Stadium, Johannesburg
15:10	Try: Thinus Delport; Conrad Jantjes; Grant Esterhuizen; Jannes Labuschagne; Con: Louis Koen (2); Pen: Louis Koen (5); Drop: Louis Koen	Scoreboard; Report	Try: Trevor Halstead; AJ Venter; Albert van den Berg; John Smit; Con: Gaffie du Toit (3); Pen: Gaffie du Toit (3)	Referee: André Watson

9 September 2000	Boland Cavaliers	38–21	Mighty Elephants	Boland Stadium, Wellington
	Try: John Daniels; Marius Joubert; Riaan van Jaarsveld; Stanley Raubenheimer; Antonius Verhoeven; Chris Potgieter; Con: Antonius Verhoeven (4)	Scoreboard; Report	Try: Gerhard Laufs; Chad Alcock; JC Roux; Con: André Fourie (3)

9 September 2000	Griffons	24–38	Falcons	North West Stadium, Welkom
15:10	Try: Frans Botes; Rouan Nel; Bani Holtzhausen; Louis van Straaten; Con: Ehan Helmund; Johhny Burger	Scoreboard; Report	Try: Eugené Meyer; Tertius Douw (2); Bakkies Botha; Kurt Steinbach; Joe Esterhuizen; Con: Pieter Jordaan (4)	Referee: Mark Lawrence

Bye/s: Free State Cheetahs

==== Round Seven ====
15 September 2000	Falcons	32–34	Boland Cavaliers	Bosman Stadium, Brakpan
	Try: Adrian Jacobs; Kurt Steinbach; Eugene Meyer; Stefan Britz; Con: Pieter Jordaan (3); Pen: Pieter Jordaan (2)	Scoreboard; Report	Try: Chris Potgieter; Riaan van Jaarsveld; Jan Ackermann; Wayne Julies; John Daniels; Con: Antonius Verhoeven (2)

16 September 2000	Sharks	42–12	Free State Cheetahs	Kings Park Stadium, Durban
15:00	Try: Albert van den Berg (3); Gaffie du Toit; Stefan Terblanche; Con: Gaffie du Toit (4); Pen: Gaffie du Toit (3)	Scoreboard; Report	Pen: Kennedy Tsimba (4)	Referee: Tappe Henning

16 September 2000	Golden Lions	94–24	Griffons	Ellis Park Stadium, Johannesburg
15:00	Try: Conrad Jantjes (2); Jannie van der Walt (2); Louis Koen (2); André Vos (2); Piet Krause; Rassie Erasmus; Dean Hall; Brett Johnstone; Leon Boshoff; Hennie le Roux; Con: Louis Koen (6); Hennie le Roux (6)	Scoreboard; Report	Try: Jacques Juries; Fourie Bornman; Rouan Nel; Con: Johnny Burger (2)	Referee: Carl Spannenberg

Bye/s: Mighty Elephants

== Section Y ==
Location of teams in 2000 Currie Cup qualification Section Y

=== Team Listing ===
2000 Currie Cup qualification Section Y teams
Team	Sponsored Name	Stadium/s	Sponsored Name
Blue Bulls	Blue Bulls	Loftus Versfeld, Pretoria	Minolta Loftus
Border Bulldogs	Border Bulldogs	Basil Kenyon Stadium, East London	Basil Kenyon Stadium
Griquas	Nashua Griquas	Griqua Park, Kimberley	Griqua Park
Leopards	Leopards	Olën Park, Potchefstroom	Olën Park
Pumas	Mpumalanga Pumas	Johann van Riebeeck Stadium, Witbank	Johann van Riebeeck Stadium
SWD Eagles	Vodacom Eagles	Outeniqua Park, George	Outeniqua Park
Western Province	Fedsure Western Province	Newlands Stadium, Cape Town	Newlands Stadium

=== Log ===
2000 Currie Cup qualification section Y log
Pos	Team	Pld	W	D	L	PF	PA	PD	TF	TA	TB	LB	Pts	CF	Qualification
1	Western Province	6	5	0	1	220	176	+44	26	20	4	0	24	14	2000 Currie Cup Top 8
2	SWD Eagles	6	4	0	2	167	161	+6	20	16	3	0	19	10	2000 Currie Cup Top 8
3	Pumas	6	3	0	3	212	208	+4	29	25	6	1	19	7	2000 Currie Cup Top 8
4	Griquas	6	3	0	3	227	214	+13	27	28	4	1	17	2	2000 Currie Cup Top 8
5	Border Bulldogs	6	3	0	3	165	178	−13	20	21	3	2	17	9	2000 Bankfin Cup
6	Blue Bulls	6	3	0	3	232	228	+4	22	25	3	1	16	6	2000 Bankfin Cup
7	Leopards	6	0	0	6	163	221	−58	19	28	3	4	7	3	2000 Bankfin Cup

Rules for classification: 4 points for a win; 2 points for a draw; 1 bonus point for a loss by seven points or less; 1 bonus point for scoring four or more tries in a match

=== Results ===
==== Round One ====
21 July 2000	Western Province	13–23	Border Bulldogs	Newlands Stadium, Cape Town
	Try: Johan van Wyk; Con: Dan van Zyl; Pen: Dan van Zyl (2)	Scoreboard; Report	Try: David Maidza; André Fox; Bennie Jacobs; Con: Greg Miller; Pen: Greg Miller (2)

22 July 2000	Griquas	58–37	Blue Bulls	Griqua Park, Kimberley
	Try: André Vermeulen; Thando Manana; Pierre Uys; Boeta Wessels; Dries Scholtz; Skolla Scholtz (2); Con: Edrich Lubbe (7); Pen: Edrich Lubbe (3)	Scoreboard; Report	Try: Casper Steyn (2); Wim Meyer; Rayno Hendricks; Con: Casper Steyn; Pen: Casper Steyn (5)

22 July 2000	SWD Eagles	12–8	Leopards	Outeniqua Park, George
	Pen: Rynhard van As (4)	Scoreboard; Report	Try: Roland de Marigny; Pen: Roland de Marigny

Bye/s: Pumas

==== Round Two ====
28 July 2000	Blue Bulls	48–19	SWD Eagles	Loftus Versfeld, Pretoria
	Try: Casper Steyn (2); Rayno Hendricks; Con: Casper Steyn (3); Pen: Casper Steyn (8); Drop: Marius Goosen	Scoreboard; Report	Try: Paul Treu; Con: Rynard van As; Pen: Theo Jansen van Rensburg; Rynard van As (3)

29 July 2000	Leopards	38–45	Western Province	Olën Park, Potchefstroom
	Try: Solly Goosen; AJ de Jager; Roland de Marigny; Keith Meyer; Con: Roland de Marigny (2); Solly Goosen; Pen: Roland de Marigny (4)	Scoreboard; Report	Try: Pietie Ferreira (2); Adri Badenhorst; Jeffrey Stevens; Desmond Houston; Stuart Abbott; Con: Chris Rossouw; Dan van Zyl (2); Pen: Chris Rossouw (2); Dan van Zyl

29 July 2000	Border Bulldogs	28–35	Pumas	Basil Kenyon Stadium, East London
	Try: David Maidza (2); Fergus Kennedy; Dale Heidtmann; Con: Greg Miller; Pen: Greg Miller (2)	Scoreboard; Report	Try: Gavin Passens (2); Giscard Pieters; Clarke Roberts; Jaco van der Westhuyzen; Con: Jaco van der Westhuyzen; Kat de Jager; Pen: Jaco van der Westhuyzen; Kat de Jager

Bye/s: Griquas

==== Round Three ====
5 August 2000	Western Province	43–30	Blue Bulls	Newlands Stadium, Cape Town
	Try: Percy Montgomery; Breyton Paulse (2); Jeffrey Stevens; Robert Markram; Con: Dan van Zyl (2); Percy Montgomery; Pen: Dan van Zyl (3); Percy Montgomery	Scoreboard; Report	Try: Joost van der Westhuizen; Casper Steyn; Danie van Schalkwyk; Con: Casper Steyn (3); Pen: Casper Steyn (3)

5 August 2000	Pumas	34–15	Leopards	Johann van Riebeeck Stadium, Witbank
	Try: Giscard Pieters (2); Gavin Passens; Henry Kemp; Piet Joubert; Con: Jorrie Kruger (3); Pen: Jorrie Kruger	Scoreboard; Report	Try: Roland de Marigny; Con: Solly Goosen; Pen: Solly Goosen	Referee: Eugene Daniels

5 August 2000	SWD Eagles	47–17	Griquas	Outeniqua Park, George
	Try: Kleinjan Tromp; Rickus Lubbe; Harold Karele (2); Paul Treu; Darryl Coeries; Gustav Rademeyer; Con: Theo Jansen van Rensburg (3); Pen: Rynard van As; Drop: Theo Jansen van Rensburg	Scoreboard; Report	Try: Slang Roux; Dries Scholtz; Con: Boeta Wessels (2); Pen: Boeta Wessels

Bye/s: Border Bulldogs

==== Round Four ====
12 August 2000	Leopards	33–36	Border Bulldogs	Olën Park, Potchefstroom
	Try: Solly Goosen (2); Johann Smith (2); Ian Noble; Con: Roland de Marigny; Solly Goosen; Pen: Roland de Marigny (2); Solly Goosen; Cards: Willem Stoltz (yellow card) 70' to 80'	Scoreboard; Report	Try: Ian Fihlani (2); Bennie Jacobs; Hein van Vuuren; Con: Greg Miller (2); Pen: Greg Miller (4)	Referee: André Watson

12 August 2000	Blue Bulls	56–49	Pumas	Loftus Versfeld, Pretoria
15:10	Try: McNeil Hendricks (2); Christo Bezuidenhout; Draadkar de Lange; Casper Steyn; Con: Casper Steyn (5); Pen: Casper Steyn (7)	Scoreboard; Report	Try: Gavin Passens (2); Bennie Nortjé; Giscard Pieters; Piet Joubert; Chaka Willemse; Con: Jorrie Kruger (5); Pen: Jorrie Kruger (3)	Referee: Jonathan Kaplan

13 August 2000	Griquas	35–37	Western Province	Griqua Park, Kimberley
15:10	Try: Pierre Uys (2); Dirkie Strydom; Dries Scholtz; Con: Edrich Lubbe (2); Dirkie Strydom; Pen: Edrich Lubbe (3)	Scoreboard; Report	Try: Adri Badenhorst; Jeffrey Stevens; Stuart Abbott; Robbie Fleck; Con: Dan van Zyl; Pen: Dan van Zyl (5)	Referee: Michael Katzenellenbogen

Bye/s: SWD Eagles

==== Round Five ====
2 September 2000	Pumas	31–17	Griquas	Johann van Riebeeck Stadium, Witbank
	Try: Bennie Nortjé (3); Frikkie Welsh (2); Jorrie Kruger; Con: Jorrie Kruger (2); Pen: Jorrie Kruger	Scoreboard; Report	Try: Pierre Uys; Edrich Lubbe; Con: Edrich Lubbe (2); Pen: Edrich Lubbe

2 September 2000	Western Province	31–18	SWD Eagles	Newlands Stadium, Cape Town
	Try: Pieter Rossouw (2); Adri Badenhorst; Con: Braam van Straaten (3); Pen: Braam van Straaten (2)	Scoreboard; Report	Try: Harold Karele; Paul Treu; Con: Rynhard van As; Pen: Rynhard van As (2)

3 September 2000	Border Bulldogs	26–23	Blue Bulls	Basil Kenyon Stadium, East London
15:10	Try: David Maidza; Hein van Vuuren; Heinrich Kok; Con: Greg Miller; Pen: Greg Miller (3)	Scoreboard; Report	Try: Tiaan Joubert (2); Con: Casper Steyn (2); Pen: Casper Steyn (3)	Referee: Andy Turner

Bye/s: Leopards

==== Round Six ====
8 September 2000	Blue Bulls	38–33	Leopards	Loftus Versfeld, Pretoria
	Try: Naka Drotské; Franco Smith; McNeil Hendricks (2); Piet Boer; Con: Casper Steyn (2); Pen: Casper Steyn (3)	Scoreboard; Report	Try: Keith Meyer; Johan Calitz; Len van Riet; Con: Roland de Marigny (3); Pen: Roland de Marigny (3)

9 September 2000	Griquas	44–26	Border Bulldogs	Griqua Park, Kimberley
	Try: De Waal Venter; Pierre Uys; Hakkies Hüsselman; Skolla Scholtz; Con: Boeta Wessels (2); Edrich Lubbe; Pen: Boeta Wessels (6); Cards: Thando Manana (yellow card); Dries Scholtz (red card) 53'	Scoreboard; Report	Try: Joe van Deventer; Derek Hendry; Graham Carlson; Tjaart Coetzee; Con: Wayne Weyer (3)	Referee: Eugene Daniëls

10 September 2000	SWD Eagles	41–31	Pumas	Outeniqua Park, George
	Try: Johan Wasserman; Rickus Lubbe; Drickus Hancke; Tommie Webb; Harold Karele; Con: Rynhard van As (4); Pen: Rynhard van As (2)	Scoreboard; Report	Try: Warren Britz; Giscard Pieters; Bennie Nortjé; Gavin Passens (2); Con: Jorrie Kruger (3)

Bye/s: Western Province

==== Round Seven ====
16 September 2000	Border Bulldogs	26–30	SWD Eagles	Basil Kenyon Stadium, East London
15:00	Try: Pietie Loots; Bennie Jacobs; Con: Greg Miller (2); Pen: Greg Miller (2); Drop: Greg Miller (2)	Scoreboard; Report	Try: Rudi Keil; Paul Treu; Wayne Munn; Rickus Lubbe; Johan Wasserman; Con: Theo Jansen van Rensburg; Pen: Rynhardd van As	Referee: André Watson

16 September 2000	Leopards	36–56	Griquas	Olën Park, Potchefstroom
	Try: Francois Janse van Rensburg; Johann Smith; Johan Calitz; Julian Ruiters (2); Con: Roland de Marigny (4); Pen: Roland de Marigny	Scoreboard; Report	Try: George Binikos; Victor Matfield; Hedley Wessels; Pierre Uys; Boeta Wessels (2); Dries Scholtz (2); Con: Boeta Wessels (8)	Referee: Andy Turner

17 September 2000	Pumas	32–51	Western Province	Johann van Riebeeck Stadium, Witbank
15:00	Try: Giscard Pieters (2); Jaco van der Westhuyzen; Frikkie Welsh; Con: Jorrie Kruger (3); Pen: Jorrie Kruger (2)	Scoreboard; Report	Try: De Wet Barry; Breyton Paulse (3); Chris Rossouw; Percy Montgomery (2); Con: Dan van Zyl (5); Pen: Dan van Zyl (2)	Referee: Jonathan Kaplan

Bye/s: Blue Bulls

== See also ==
- 2000 Currie Cup Top 8
- 2000 Bankfin Cup
