= List of Bulls (rugby union) players =

This is a list of rugby union footballers who have played for the Bulls in Super Rugby, the Pro14 and United Rugby Championship competitions, and the European Rugby Champions Cup. The list includes any player that has played in a regular season match, semi-final or final for the Bulls, ordered by debut date and name. The Bulls competed in Super Rugby in 1996 as Northern Transvaal, in 1997 as the Blue Bulls, between 1998 and 2000 as the Northern Bulls and between 2001 and 2020 as the Bulls, competed in the Pro14 Rainbow Cup in 2021, in the United Rugby Championship from 2021, in the European Rugby Champions Cup since the 2022/23 season and the EPCR Challenge Cup in 2024/25.

== Super Rugby players ==
No.	Name	Caps	Tries	C	P	DG	Points	Debut	Last
1	Johan Ackermann	12						09/03/1996	19/05/1996
2	Schutte Bekker	43	4				20	09/03/1996	12/05/2000
3	Frikkie Bosman	15	2				10	09/03/1996	10/03/2001
4	Dawie du Toit	11	2		1		13	09/03/1996	19/05/1996
5	Marius Hurter	21						09/03/1996	16/05/1997
6	Jannie Kruger	11	1	16	32	2	139	09/03/1996	19/05/1996
7	Ruben Kruger	30	3				15	09/03/1996	12/05/2000
8	FA Meiring	6	2				10	09/03/1996	16/03/1997
9	Jacques Olivier	20	7				35	09/03/1996	14/05/1999
10	Krynauw Otto	46	2				10	09/03/1996	12/05/2000
11	Adriaan Richter	31	8				40	09/03/1996	15/05/1998
12	André Snyman	34	6				30	09/03/1996	03/04/1999
13	Andries Truscott	16	3				15	09/03/1996	20/03/1999
14	Joost van der Westhuizen	47	9		1		48	09/03/1996	10/05/2003
15	Danie van Schalkwyk	44	5				25	09/03/1996	11/05/2001
16	Matt Proudfoot	12						09/03/1996	10/05/2003
17	Coenraad Breytenbach	14	2				10	09/03/1996	25/04/1998
18	Lance Sherrell	5	1	5	10		45	16/03/1996	11/04/1996
19	Derrick Grobbelaar	20	1				5	16/03/1996	11/05/2001
20	Jacques Blaauw	2						20/03/1996	11/04/1996
21	Braam van Straaten	12	2	5	14		62	03/04/1996	15/05/1998
22	Petrus Arnold	4						07/04/1996	28/04/2000
23	Grant Esterhuizen	15	3				15	07/04/1996	17/04/1999
24	Johan Otto	16	1				5	07/04/1996	25/04/1998
25	Jannie Brooks	41	3				15	07/04/1996	05/05/2001
26	Pierre Ribbens	27	2				10	11/04/1996	24/03/2001
27	Lourens Campher	11						11/04/1996	16/05/1997
28	Theo Jansen van Rensburg	10	3	11	6		55	19/04/1996	28/03/1997
29	Hannes Venter	21	6				30	19/04/1996	23/02/2002
30	Botha Rossouw	1						19/04/1996	19/04/1996
31	Ralf Schroeder	11						27/04/1996	11/05/2001
32	Jannie Claassens	5						10/05/1996	06/04/1997
33	Robert Rein	1						19/05/1996	19/05/1996
34	Wium Basson	23						01/03/1997	12/05/2000
35	Wynand Lourens	10	1				5	01/03/1997	21/04/2001
36	Clive Terre Blanche	4						01/03/1997	06/04/1997
37	Henry Tromp	10	2				10	01/03/1997	16/05/1997
38	Kosie Alberts	4	1	1			7	01/03/1997	06/04/1997
39	Boeta Wessels	19	4	6	8		56	08/03/1997	06/04/2002
40	Nicolaas Alberts	1						16/03/1997	16/03/1997
41	Dirkie Nortje	2		1			2	16/03/1997	22/03/1997
42	Nicky van der Walt	33	4				20	22/03/1997	11/05/2001
43	Billy Bronkhorst	1						22/03/1997	22/03/1997
44	Kosie Jansen van Vuuren	5	1				5	22/03/1997	19/04/1997
45	Graeme Bouwer	7	3	1	1		20	28/03/1997	16/05/1997
46	Piet Boer	31						12/04/1997	11/05/2002
47	Casper Steyn	33	8	23	40		206	12/04/1997	11/05/2001
48	Frikkie Spangenberg	1						12/04/1997	12/04/1997
49	Wessel Roux	52	6				30	12/04/1997	16/02/2007
50	Johan Schutte	3	2				10	03/05/1997	16/05/1997
51	Lourens Muller	2						03/05/1997	16/05/1997
52	Roland de Marigny	3						03/05/1997	25/04/1998
53	Eric Kruger	1						16/05/1997	16/05/1997
54	Matthys Bekker	1	1				5	16/05/1997	16/05/1997
55	Brent Moyle	1						16/05/1997	16/05/1997
56	Kobus Engelbrecht	1	1				5	16/05/1997	16/05/1997
57	Frans Allers	1						28/02/1998	28/02/1998
58	Marius Goosen	36	7	3	3	1	53	28/02/1998	28/04/2001
59	McNeil Hendricks	10	1				5	28/02/1998	09/03/2002
60	Johan le Roux	12						28/02/1998	27/03/1999
61	Franco Smith	33	3	20	27		136	28/02/1998	11/05/2002
62	Elandré van der Bergh	8						28/02/1998	15/05/1998
63	Dan van Zyl	6	1				5	28/02/1998	05/04/1998
64	Ian MacDonald	3						06/03/1998	11/04/1998
65	Jan Ackermann	6						06/03/1998	15/05/1998
66	Dale Santon	22	2				10	06/03/1998	21/02/2004
67	Henry Kemp	10	1				5	21/03/1998	14/05/1999
68	Gunder Williamson	17						25/04/1998	08/04/2001
69	Deon de Kock	17	5				25	27/02/1999	12/05/2000
70	Jan-Harm van Wyk	5	1				5	27/02/1999	09/04/1999
71	Willem Meyer	9						27/02/1999	25/03/2000
72	Jaco Espag	21	1				5	27/02/1999	12/05/2000
73	Craig McIntosh	4						06/03/1999	03/04/1999
74	Matthys Stoltz	5						06/03/1999	03/04/1999
75	Johannes Brand	9	1				5	06/03/1999	08/04/2001
76	Gavin Lawless	4	1	1	3		16	06/03/1999	03/04/1999
77	Stanley Raubenheimer	5	1				5	06/03/1999	26/02/2000
78	Danie van der Walt	6						03/04/1999	14/05/1999
79	Frikkie Welsh	50	17				85	03/04/1999	31/03/2007
80	Draadkar de Lange	5						03/04/1999	14/05/1999
81	Wayne Julies	9						09/04/1999	05/05/2007
82	Andre Fox	4						09/04/1999	14/05/1999
83	Delarey du Preez	1						17/04/1999	17/04/1999
84	Riaan Potgieter	3						24/04/1999	14/05/1999
85	Mike Marais	1						06/05/1999	06/05/1999
86	Jaco Booysen	1						14/05/1999	14/05/1999
87	Jannie de Beer	10		9	31	4	123	26/02/2000	12/05/2000
88	Naka Drotské	16						26/02/2000	24/03/2001
89	Os du Randt	10						26/02/2000	12/05/2000
90	Matt Frank	13						26/02/2000	22/03/2002
91	Tiaan Joubert	3	1				5	26/02/2000	28/04/2000
92	Chris Kruger	2						26/02/2000	04/03/2000
93	Hendrik Kruger	2						26/02/2000	28/04/2000
94	Anton Leonard	51	7				35	26/02/2000	31/03/2007
95	Piet Joubert	18	1				5	26/02/2000	02/03/2002
96	Marius Bosman	7						26/02/2000	15/04/2000
97	Johan Human	15						26/02/2000	11/05/2001
98	Eugene Meyer	9	1				5	26/02/2000	12/05/2000
99	Darryl Coeries	1						04/03/2000	04/03/2000
100	Russell Nelson	2						04/03/2000	11/03/2000
101	Bennie Nortje	6	1				5	04/03/2000	22/04/2000
102	Sias Wagner	10	1				5	04/03/2000	11/05/2001
103	Paul Treu	9						11/03/2000	12/05/2000
104	Jaco van der Westhuyzen	56	7	10	3		64	11/03/2000	23/04/2011
105	Henry Pedro	4	1				5	08/04/2000	12/05/2000
106	Braam Els	5						23/02/2001	08/04/2001
107	Friedrich Lombard	11	4				20	23/02/2001	11/05/2001
108	Victor Matfield	140	8				40	23/02/2001	06/06/2015
109	Johan Wasserman	14	1				5	23/02/2001	25/02/2006
110	Adrian Jacobs	21	9				45	23/02/2001	11/05/2002
111	Pierre Uys	6						23/02/2001	08/04/2001
112	Hendro Scholtz	2						17/03/2001	24/03/2001
113	Thando Manana	6						24/03/2001	11/05/2001
114	James Dalton	16	1				5	08/04/2001	11/05/2002
115	Gerhard Laufs	1						08/04/2001	08/04/2001
116	Hakkies Husselman	16	5				25	08/04/2001	11/05/2002
117	Joe Esterhuyzen	1						14/04/2001	14/04/2001
118	Marco Wentzel	16						14/04/2001	11/05/2002
119	JP Nel	78	15				75	14/04/2001	16/05/2009
120	Dries Scholtz	4						05/05/2001	31/03/2006
121	Coenraad Groenewald	6						11/05/2001	12/04/2003
122	Wylie Human	11	5				25	23/02/2002	11/05/2002
123	Chris le Roux	10	1				5	23/02/2002	11/05/2002
124	Danie Rossouw	116	9				45	23/02/2002	18/06/2011
125	Danie Coetzee	44						23/02/2002	21/05/2005
126	Richard Bands	33	1				5	23/02/2002	10/02/2007
127	Gavin Passens	7						23/02/2002	04/05/2002
128	Bakkies Botha	100	11				55	02/03/2002	18/06/2011
129	Gerrie Britz	7						02/03/2002	11/05/2002
130	Christo Bezuidenhout	30	3				15	09/03/2002	08/05/2004
131	Nel Fourie	1		1	4		14	09/03/2002	09/03/2002
132	Norman Jordaan	17	1				5	16/03/2002	08/05/2004
133	Giscard Peters	6	4				20	16/03/2002	11/05/2002
134	Pedrie Wannenburg	113	14				70	16/03/2002	29/05/2010
135	Leon van den Heever	4	2	4	1		21	06/04/2002	27/04/2002
136	Ettienne Botha	30	13				65	12/04/2002	21/05/2005
137	Johan Roets	36	3				15	04/05/2002	19/05/2007
138	Geo Cronjé	15						21/02/2003	13/03/2004
139	John Daniels	5						21/02/2003	22/03/2003
140	Fabian Juries	7	3				15	21/02/2003	10/05/2003
141	Louis Koen	11		17	28	7	139	21/02/2003	10/05/2003
142	Piet Krause	21	3				15	21/02/2003	08/05/2004
143	Anton Pitout	10	1				5	21/02/2003	10/05/2003
144	Wikus van Heerden	38	12				60	21/02/2003	09/05/2008
145	Dewey Swartbooi	9						21/02/2003	10/05/2003
146	Jacques Cronjé	48	5				25	21/02/2003	20/05/2006
147	Fourie du Preez	112	22				110	21/02/2003	18/06/2011
148	Eddie Fredericks	20	6				30	01/03/2003	08/05/2004
149	Riaan van den Bergh	6	1				5	01/03/2003	25/02/2006
150	Derick Hougaard	51	1	85	97	10	476	15/03/2003	03/05/2008
151	Gary Botha	77	8				40	21/02/2004	18/06/2011
152	Hennie Daniller	7						21/02/2004	08/05/2004
153	Andries Human	18						21/02/2004	15/04/2006
154	Odwa Ndungane	10	3				15	21/02/2004	08/05/2004
155	Willem de Waal	10	1	10	2		31	21/02/2004	08/05/2004
156	Sam Willard	3	1				5	28/02/2004	30/04/2004
157	Warren Brosnihan	12						26/02/2005	21/05/2005
158	Bryan Habana	61	37				185	26/02/2005	30/05/2009
159	Kees Lensing	10						26/02/2005	21/05/2005
160	Ricardo Loubscher	3						26/02/2005	26/03/2005
161	Akona Ndungane	108	33				165	26/02/2005	05/07/2014
162	François van Schouwenburg	20	1				5	26/02/2005	27/04/2007
163	Trompie Nontshinga	1						04/03/2005	04/03/2005
164	Kennedy Tsimba	7	1	3			11	04/03/2005	14/05/2005
165	Heini Adams	36	3				15	04/03/2005	15/05/2010
166	Pierre Spies	119	29				145	11/03/2005	13/06/2015
167	Wynand Olivier	110	29				145	11/03/2005	29/06/2013
168	Morné Steyn	123	14	259	295	26	1,551	26/03/2005	07/11/2020
169	Gurthrö Steenkamp	60	1				5	09/04/2005	19/03/2011
170	Jaco Engels	40	2				10	10/02/2006	15/05/2010
171	Danie Thiart	27						10/02/2006	19/05/2007
172	Kobus van der Walt	4						10/02/2006	11/03/2006
173	Chiliboy Ralepelle	69	4				20	10/02/2006	27/07/2013
174	Tim Dlulane	10	1				5	11/03/2006	20/05/2006
175	Adriaan Strauss	59	11				55	17/03/2006	26/06/2018
176	Danwel Demas	4						25/03/2006	22/03/2008
177	Rudi Coetzee	2						08/04/2006	15/04/2006
178	Derick Kuün	68	8				40	03/02/2007	21/05/2011
179	Hilton Lobberts	7						03/02/2007	17/05/2008
180	Jacques-Louis Potgieter	35	3	21	45	3	201	10/02/2007	13/06/2015
181	Adriaan Fondse	1						10/02/2007	10/02/2007
182	Marius Delport	9						16/02/2007	30/05/2009
183	Ruan Vermeulen	4						24/02/2007	17/03/2007
184	Rayno Gerber	38						24/03/2007	02/06/2012
185	Nick Eyre	1						12/05/2007	12/05/2007
186	Zane Kirchner	82	21				105	16/02/2008	27/07/2013
187	John Mametsa	6	1				5	16/02/2008	24/04/2010
188	Wilhelm Steenkamp	36						16/02/2008	06/07/2013
189	Deon Stegmann	95	9				45	16/02/2008	28/05/2016
190	Werner Kruger	120	8				40	16/02/2008	16/07/2016
191	Dewald Potgieter	70	4				20	16/02/2008	05/04/2014
192	James van der Walt	4						22/02/2008	15/03/2008
193	Stephan Dippenaar	21	1				5	07/03/2008	03/06/2011
194	Dean Greyling	67	6				30	07/03/2008	06/06/2015
195	Bandise Maku	28						22/03/2008	16/07/2016
196	Francois Hougaard	88	26				130	19/04/2008	13/06/2015
197	Burton Francis	9	1	3	1		14	09/05/2008	30/05/2009
198	Jaco Pretorius	30	1				5	14/02/2009	18/06/2011
199	Frik Kirsten	34						14/02/2009	01/03/2014
200	Gerhard van den Heever	31	12				60	07/03/2009	18/06/2011
201	Jacques Burger	2						07/03/2009	28/03/2009
202	Flip van der Merwe	75	2				10	12/02/2010	13/06/2015
203	Bees Roux	14						12/02/2010	29/05/2010
204	Fudge Mabeta	2						20/02/2010	15/05/2010
205	Rossouw de Klerk	14						13/03/2010	18/06/2011
206	De Wet Barry	1						15/05/2010	15/05/2010
207	Deon Helberg	1						15/05/2010	15/05/2010
208	Tiger Mangweni	1						15/05/2010	15/05/2010
209	Gerrit-Jan van Velze	2						15/05/2010	21/04/2012
210	Stefan Watermeyer	1						15/05/2010	15/05/2010
211	Ruan Snyman	1	1				5	15/05/2010	15/05/2010
212	Ockert Kruger	1						15/05/2010	15/05/2010
213	Francois Brummer	23	1	30	19	1	125	15/05/2010	03/03/2018
214	Bjorn Basson	86	29				145	19/02/2011	28/05/2016
215	Juandré Kruger	35	1				5	24/02/2012	29/02/2020
216	Jacques Potgieter	28	5				25	24/02/2012	06/05/2017
217	Johann Sadie	10						24/02/2012	25/05/2012
218	Francois Venter	11						24/02/2012	13/07/2013
219	Willie Wepener	23	1				5	24/02/2012	29/06/2013
220	CJ Stander	16	4				20	24/02/2012	14/07/2012
221	Louis Fouché	24	2	5	8	1	47	24/02/2012	21/02/2014
222	JJ Engelbrecht	65	9				45	24/02/2012	13/06/2015
223	Jano Vermaak	31	6				30	03/03/2012	27/07/2013
224	Arno Botha	51	2				10	24/03/2012	21/11/2020
225	Bongi Mbonambi	15						07/04/2012	05/07/2014
226	Dawie Steyn	2						21/04/2012	11/05/2012
227	Lionel Mapoe	12	2				10	22/02/2013	01/06/2013
228	Morné Mellett	36						22/02/2013	13/06/2015
229	Grant Hattingh	46	1				5	22/02/2013	16/07/2016
230	Sampie Mastriet	2	1				5	02/03/2013	22/03/2014
231	Jean Cook	1	1				5	02/03/2013	02/03/2013
232	Jan Serfontein	60	17				85	02/03/2013	15/07/2017
233	Jurgen Visser	31	2		1		13	10/03/2013	29/05/2015
234	Paul Willemse	20	3				15	23/03/2013	11/07/2014
235	Callie Visagie	35	2				10	13/04/2013	13/06/2015
236	Rudy Paige	48	1				5	13/04/2013	15/07/2017
237	Ulrich Beyers	11						13/04/2013	27/05/2017
238	Hencus van Wyk	2						27/04/2013	27/02/2016
239	Jono Ross	19	4				20	29/06/2013	11/07/2014
240	Jacques du Plessis	31	2				10	13/07/2013	13/06/2015
241	Marcel van der Merwe	48	5				25	15/02/2014	21/11/2020
242	Jacques Engelbrecht	13						15/02/2014	11/07/2014
243	Handré Pollard	60	11	104	119	3	629	15/02/2014	22/06/2019
244	Piet van Zyl	46	9				45	15/02/2014	15/07/2017
245	Wiaan Liebenberg	1						21/02/2014	21/02/2014
246	William Small-Smith	7	1				5	11/04/2014	11/07/2014
247	Wimpie van der Walt	4						26/04/2014	31/05/2014
248	Roelof Smit	26	3				15	05/07/2014	13/04/2019
249	Marvin Orie	10						05/07/2014	16/07/2016
250	Nico Janse van Rensburg	5						11/07/2014	02/04/2016
251	Jesse Kriel	70	19				95	11/07/2014	22/06/2019
252	Lappies Labuschagné	33	5				25	14/02/2015	16/07/2016
253	Trevor Nyakane	78						14/02/2015	21/11/2020
254	Hanro Liebenberg	44	8				40	20/02/2015	22/06/2019
255	Travis Ismaiel	44	10				50	28/02/2015	21/11/2020
256	Tian Schoeman	34		36	26	1	153	28/02/2015	15/07/2017
257	Burger Odendaal	59	7				35	28/03/2015	22/02/2020
258	Jaco Visagie	53	3				15	11/04/2015	14/03/2020
259	Nick de Jager	29	4				20	27/02/2016	14/07/2018
260	Warrick Gelant	52	18				90	27/02/2016	14/03/2020
261	Jannes Kirsten	46	2				10	27/02/2016	22/06/2019
262	RG Snyman	49	2				10	27/02/2016	22/06/2019
263	Jason Jenkins	57	8				40	27/02/2016	07/11/2020
264	Lizo Gqoboka	61	4				20	27/02/2016	10/10/2020
265	Dries Swanepoel	11	2				10	05/03/2016	14/07/2018
266	Jamba Ulengo	23	9				45	18/03/2016	14/07/2018
267	Pierre Schoeman	35	3				15	26/03/2016	14/07/2018
268	SP Marais	11	2				10	02/04/2016	16/07/2016
269	Ivan van Zyl	43	3				15	02/04/2016	21/11/2020
270	Dan Kriel	3						09/04/2016	06/05/2016
271	Renaldo Bothma	7	2				10	02/07/2016	30/06/2017
272	Nqoba Mxoli	5						09/07/2016	26/05/2018
273	Lood de Jager	22	4				20	25/02/2017	23/02/2019
274	Jacobie Adriaanse	7						25/02/2017	27/05/2017
275	Ruan Steenkamp	25						25/02/2017	14/03/2020
276	Edgar Marutlulle	8						25/02/2017	07/07/2018
277	John-Roy Jenkinson	4						25/03/2017	15/07/2017
278	Franco Naudé	2						08/04/2017	14/03/2020
279	Martin Dreyer	3						08/04/2017	22/04/2017
280	Marnus Schoeman	1						15/04/2017	15/04/2017
281	Jade Stighling	6	2				10	13/05/2017	16/10/2020
282	Tony Jantjies	5		2			4	13/05/2017	15/07/2017
283	Conraad van Vuuren	18	1				5	13/05/2017	06/04/2019
284	Rabz Maxwane	1						20/05/2017	20/05/2017
285	Abongile Nonkontwana	5						20/05/2017	08/02/2020
286	Duncan Matthews	8	3				15	27/05/2017	21/04/2018
287	Kefentse Mahlo	1						30/06/2017	30/06/2017
288	André Warner	20	3				15	30/06/2017	22/06/2019
289	Shaun Adendorff	4						30/06/2017	21/04/2018
290	Ruben van Heerden	5						08/07/2017	07/07/2018
291	Thembelani Bholi	22						24/02/2018	10/05/2019
292	Johnny Kôtze	34	8				40	24/02/2018	14/03/2020
293	Divan Rossouw	30	4				20	24/02/2018	14/03/2020
294	Frans van Wyk	10						24/02/2018	19/05/2018
295	Embrose Papier	35	3				15	24/02/2018	21/11/2020
296	Marnitz Boshoff	3		1	3		11	24/02/2018	10/03/2018
297	Marco van Staden	35	6				30	24/02/2018	21/11/2020
298	Manie Libbok	22	4	13	7		67	16/03/2018	14/03/2020
299	Tim Agaba	6						23/03/2018	10/10/2020
300	Hendré Stassen	3						23/03/2018	19/05/2018
301	JT Jackson	3						19/05/2018	07/06/2019
302	Matthys Basson	2						26/05/2018	14/07/2018
303	Mornay Smith	5						30/06/2018	16/10/2020
304	Ruan Nortjé	12	2				10	14/07/2018	21/11/2020
305	Johan Grobbelaar	11	1				5	14/07/2018	31/10/2020
306	Boeta Hamman	1						14/07/2018	14/07/2018
307	Schalk Brits	11						16/02/2019	07/06/2019
308	Rosko Specman	19	9				45	16/02/2019	14/03/2020
309	Duane Vermeulen	19	2				10	16/02/2019	21/11/2020
310	Dayan van der Westhuizen	5						16/02/2019	23/03/2019
311	Corniel Els	15						16/02/2019	21/11/2020
312	Eli Snyman	7						16/02/2019	15/06/2019
313	Simphiwe Matanzima	18	1				5	16/02/2019	31/01/2020
314	Dylan Sage	9						16/02/2019	07/06/2019
315	Cornal Hendricks	25	7				35	23/02/2019	21/11/2020
316	Paul Schoeman	8						09/03/2019	31/05/2019
317	Wiehahn Herbst	16						13/04/2019	14/03/2020
318	Andries Ferreira	4						31/01/2020	29/02/2020
319	Jeandré Rudolph	4	1				5	31/01/2020	29/02/2020
320	Josh Strauss	6						31/01/2020	14/03/2020
321	Ryno Pieterse	3						31/01/2020	14/03/2020
322	Wian Vosloo	3						31/01/2020	22/02/2020
323	Gerhard Steenekamp	10						08/02/2020	21/11/2020
324	Nafi Tuitavake	2						29/02/2020	07/03/2020
325	Ian Groenewald	2						07/03/2020	14/03/2020
326	Muller Uys	2						07/03/2020	14/03/2020
327	Marco Jansen van Vuren	6	1				5	14/03/2020	21/11/2020
328	Gio Aplon	2						10/10/2020	16/10/2020
329	Stedman Gans	6	5				25	10/10/2020	21/11/2020
330	David Kriel	6						10/10/2020	21/11/2020
331	Jacques van Rooyen	6						10/10/2020	21/11/2020
332	Elrigh Louw	4						10/10/2020	07/11/2020
333	Sintu Manjezi	6						10/10/2020	21/11/2020
334	Clinton Swart	2						16/10/2020	21/11/2020
335	Nizaam Carr	3						16/10/2020	21/11/2020
336	Chris Smith	3	1	3	1		14	16/10/2020	21/11/2020
337	Joe van Zyl	4	2				10	16/10/2020	21/11/2020
338	Kurt-Lee Arendse	4	2				10	24/10/2020	21/11/2020
339	Walt Steenkamp	2						07/11/2020	21/11/2020

== Pro14/United Rugby Championship players ==
No.	Name	Caps	Tries	C	P	DG	Points	Debut	Last
1	Nizaam Carr	46	3				15	01/05/2021	03/10/2026
2	Johan Grobbelaar	98	41				205	01/05/2021	31/10/2026
3	Cornal Hendricks	43	8				40	01/05/2021	29/10/2023
4	Stravino Jacobs	36	11				55	01/05/2021	31/10/2026
5	Marco Jansen van Vuren	9						01/05/2021	26/11/2022
6	Elrigh Louw	82	20				100	01/05/2021	24/10/2026
7	Ruan Nortjé	88	11				55	01/05/2021	19/06/2026
8	Embrose Papier	98	26				130	01/05/2021	19/06/2026
9	Chris Smith	56	6	92	57	1	388	01/05/2021	01/06/2024
10	Mornay Smith	75						01/05/2021	26/09/2026
11	Gerhard Steenekamp	88	2				10	01/05/2021	31/10/2026
12	Janko Swanepoel	47	2				10	01/05/2021	27/04/2024
13	Madosh Tambwe	27	12				60	01/05/2021	18/06/2022
14	Marco van Staden	65	8				40	01/05/2021	24/10/2026
15	James Verity-Amm	5						01/05/2021	29/04/2022
16	Lizo Gqoboka	12	2				10	01/05/2021	05/02/2022
17	Walt Steenkamp	35	2				10	01/05/2021	30/10/2022
18	Morné Steyn	27		42	18		138	01/05/2021	04/03/2023
19	Zak Burger	73	12				60	01/05/2021	31/10/2026
20	Arno Botha	23	3				15	01/05/2021	18/06/2022
21	Jacques van Rooyen	17						01/05/2021	15/10/2022
22	Joe van Zyl	6						01/05/2021	02/04/2022
23	David Kriel	90	28	18	8		200	01/05/2021	25/04/2026
24	Duane Vermeulen	4						08/05/2021	04/06/2021
25	Schalk Erasmus	6						08/05/2021	16/10/2021
26	Trevor Nyakane	4						15/05/2021	12/06/2021
27	Clinton Swart	3						22/05/2021	19/06/2021
28	Keagan Johannes	39	3	37	10	1	120	22/05/2021	10/10/2026
29	Marcell Coetzee	74	29				145	04/06/2021	31/10/2026
30	Ivan van Zyl	3						04/06/2021	19/06/2021
31	Gio Aplon	2						12/06/2021	19/06/2021
32	Muller Uys	6						12/06/2021	12/02/2022
33	Jan Uys	1						19/06/2021	19/06/2021
34	Bismarck du Plessis	24	5				25	25/09/2021	06/05/2023
35	Johan Goosen	38	3	88	41		314	25/09/2021	14/06/2025
36	Lionel Mapoe	26	3				15	25/09/2021	06/05/2023
37	Harold Vorster	81	16				80	25/09/2021	31/10/2026
38	Jacques du Plessis	6						25/09/2021	04/03/2023
39	Simphiwe Matanzima	63	3				15	25/09/2021	31/05/2025
40	Stedman Gans	54	5				25	25/09/2021	31/10/2026
41	Ruan Combrinck	1						01/10/2021	01/10/2021
42	Kurt-Lee Arendse	55	31				155	09/10/2021	19/06/2026
43	Robert Hunt	15	1				5	09/10/2021	18/06/2022
44	Jan-Hendrik Wessels	57	6				30	09/10/2021	31/10/2026
45	Richard Kriel	1						03/12/2021	03/12/2021
46	Sintu Manjezi	4						03/12/2021	04/10/2025
47	Reinhardt Ludwig	45	4				20	22/01/2022	24/10/2026
48	Canan Moodie	67	35				175	29/01/2022	10/10/2026
49	WJ Steenkamp	13	2				10	25/02/2022	22/04/2023
50	Juan Mostert	2						25/02/2022	20/05/2022
51	Cyle Brink	22	5				25	18/03/2022	25/11/2023
52	Dylan Smith	12						23/04/2022	26/09/2026
53	Mihlali Mosi	1						17/09/2022	17/09/2022
54	Sbu Nkosi	5	2				10	17/09/2022	04/03/2023
55	Wandisile Simelane	10	2				10	17/09/2022	04/11/2023
56	Ruan Vermaak	61	8				40	17/09/2022	31/10/2026
57	Francois Klopper	55	2				10	17/09/2022	31/10/2026
58	Sebastian Lombard	3						23/12/2022	06/01/2023
59	Bernard van der Linde	3						31/12/2022	17/05/2025
60	Sibongile Novuka	2						04/03/2023	06/05/2023
61	Sebastian de Klerk	48	13				65	22/10/2023	31/10/2026
62	Cameron Hanekom	44	10				50	22/10/2023	31/10/2026
63	Wilco Louw	50	2				10	22/10/2023	19/06/2026
64	Devon Williams	38	5				25	22/10/2023	16/05/2026
65	Akker van der Merwe	43	18				90	22/10/2023	03/01/2026
66	Jaco van der Walt	7	1	8	3		30	22/10/2023	28/09/2024
67	Sergeal Petersen	20	11				55	04/11/2023	30/05/2026
68	Mpilo Gumede	25	5				25	10/11/2023	16/05/2026
69	Willie le Roux	54	9	8			61	25/11/2023	31/10/2026
70	Deon Slabbert	3						02/12/2023	27/01/2024
71	Khutha Mchunu	9						27/01/2024	31/10/2026
72	JF van Heerden	29	1				5	02/03/2024	31/10/2026
73	Jannes Kirsten	14	1				5	27/04/2024	14/06/2025
74	Cornel Smit	1						15/06/2024	15/06/2024
75	Chris Smit	2						28/09/2024	25/10/2024
76	Alulutho Tshakweni	24						28/09/2024	31/10/2026
77	Cobus Wiese	40	5				25	28/09/2024	31/10/2026
78	Nama Xaba	8						28/09/2024	24/10/2025
79	Boeta Chamberlain	8	1	13	5		46	28/09/2024	29/03/2025
80	Aphiwe Dyantyi	4						05/10/2024	15/02/2025
81	Henry Immelman	1						18/10/2024	18/10/2024
82	Jaco Grobbelaar	2						25/04/2025	29/11/2025
83	Juann Else	8	1				5	25/04/2025	03/10/2026
84	Cheswill Jooste	11	6				30	27/09/2025	24/10/2026
85	Jan Serfontein	3	1				5	27/09/2025	29/11/2025
86	JJ Theron	6						27/09/2025	20/12/2025
87	Nico Janse van Rensburg	4						27/09/2025	17/10/2025
88	Paul de Wet	19	4				20	27/09/2025	31/10/2026
89	Handré Pollard	18	3	46	13		146	11/10/2025	24/10/2026
90	Jeandré Rudolph	21	4				20	11/10/2025	31/10/2026
91	Etienne Janeke	1						24/10/2025	24/10/2025
92	Sti Sithole	3						29/11/2025	03/10/2026
93	Curwin Bosch	5		16	2		38	26/09/2026	31/10/2026
94	Hanro Liebenberg	5						26/09/2026	31/10/2026
95	Hakeem Kunene	3						26/09/2026	31/10/2026
96	Janco Uys	2						26/09/2026	03/10/2026
97	Thaakir Abrahams	1						03/10/2026	03/10/2026
98	Luan Giliomee	1						24/10/2026	24/10/2026
99	Sango Xamlashe	1						24/10/2026	24/10/2026
100	Dylan Maart	2	2				10	24/10/2026	31/10/2026

== European Rugby Champions Cup/Challenge Cup players ==
No.	Name	Caps	Tries	C	P	DG	Points	Debut	Last
1	Nizaam Carr	8	2				10	10/12/2022	16/01/2026
2	Bismarck du Plessis	5						10/12/2022	02/04/2023
3	Jacques du Plessis	1						10/12/2022	10/12/2022
4	Stedman Gans	11						10/12/2022	04/04/2026
5	Stravino Jacobs	9	5				25	10/12/2022	17/10/2026
6	Marco Jansen van Vuren	1						10/12/2022	10/12/2022
7	Reinhardt Ludwig	13	2				10	10/12/2022	16/01/2026
8	Sibongile Novuka	3	1				5	10/12/2022	11/01/2025
9	Wandisile Simelane	4	2				10	10/12/2022	20/01/2023
10	Dylan Smith	7						10/12/2022	11/01/2025
11	WJ Steenkamp	4						10/12/2022	02/04/2023
12	Morné Steyn	3		8			16	10/12/2022	02/04/2023
13	Muller Uys	2						10/12/2022	17/12/2022
14	Bernard van der Linde	4	2				10	10/12/2022	11/01/2025
15	Jacques van Rooyen	2						10/12/2022	17/12/2022
16	Chris Smith	8	2	8	8		50	10/12/2022	13/04/2024
17	Janko Swanepoel	9	1				5	10/12/2022	13/04/2024
18	Keagan Johannes	11		3	1		9	10/12/2022	16/01/2026
19	Lizo Gqoboka	2						10/12/2022	17/12/2022
20	Sebastian Lombard	3						10/12/2022	11/01/2025
21	Jan-Hendrik Wessels	14	3				15	10/12/2022	17/10/2026
22	Phumzile Maqondwana	2						10/12/2022	17/12/2022
23	Chris Smit	2	1				5	17/12/2022	11/01/2025
24	Carlton Banies	1						17/12/2022	17/12/2022
25	Joe van Zyl	2						17/12/2022	11/01/2025
26	Juan Mostert	1						17/12/2022	17/12/2022
27	Cameron Hanekom	11	6				30	17/12/2022	17/10/2026
28	Kurt-Lee Arendse	7	1				5	14/01/2023	04/04/2026
29	Zak Burger	14	1				5	14/01/2023	04/04/2026
30	Johan Grobbelaar	11	2				10	14/01/2023	17/10/2026
31	David Kriel	14	8	2			44	14/01/2023	04/04/2026
32	Elrigh Louw	14	3				15	14/01/2023	17/10/2026
33	Canan Moodie	11	2				10	14/01/2023	04/04/2026
34	Ruan Nortjé	11						14/01/2023	04/04/2026
35	Mornay Smith	17						14/01/2023	04/04/2026
36	Gerhard Steenekamp	14						14/01/2023	17/10/2026
37	Marco van Staden	13	4				20	14/01/2023	17/10/2026
38	Ruan Vermaak	11	3				15	14/01/2023	04/04/2026
39	Harold Vorster	15						14/01/2023	17/10/2026
40	Johan Goosen	11		26	3		61	14/01/2023	12/04/2025
41	Francois Klopper	10						14/01/2023	17/10/2026
42	Embrose Papier	17	4				20	14/01/2023	17/10/2026
43	Lionel Mapoe	3						14/01/2023	16/12/2023
44	Cyle Brink	2						20/01/2023	02/04/2023
45	Cornal Hendricks	4						20/01/2023	13/04/2024
46	Simphiwe Matanzima	9						20/01/2023	12/04/2025
47	Willie le Roux	10	3				15	09/12/2023	17/10/2026
48	Wilco Louw	9						09/12/2023	10/01/2026
49	Akker van der Merwe	13	3				15	09/12/2023	16/01/2026
50	Marcell Coetzee	13	4				20	09/12/2023	04/04/2026
51	Mpilo Gumede	8	1				5	16/12/2023	16/01/2026
52	Henry Immelman	4						16/12/2023	11/01/2025
53	Sergeal Petersen	7	3				15	16/12/2023	10/01/2026
54	Deon Slabbert	4						16/12/2023	11/01/2025
55	Devon Williams	11	2				10	16/12/2023	14/12/2025
56	Khutha Mchunu	5	1				5	16/12/2023	17/10/2026
57	Sebastian de Klerk	12	6				30	16/12/2023	17/10/2026
58	JF van Heerden	12						16/12/2023	17/10/2026
59	Jaco van der Walt	4			3		9	16/12/2023	11/01/2025
60	Tiaan Lange	1						13/01/2024	13/01/2024
61	Merwe Olivier	1						13/04/2024	13/04/2024
62	Cobus Wiese	7	1				5	07/12/2024	17/10/2026
63	Jannes Kirsten	3						07/12/2024	12/04/2025
64	Aphiwe Dyantyi	2						07/12/2024	11/01/2025
65	Alulutho Tshakweni	9						07/12/2024	17/10/2026
66	Nama Xaba	2						14/12/2024	11/01/2025
67	Boeta Chamberlain	3	1	3	1		14	14/12/2024	18/01/2025
68	Katlego Letebele	1						11/01/2025	11/01/2025
69	Sintu Manjezi	1						11/01/2025	11/01/2025
70	Cornel Smit	1						11/01/2025	11/01/2025
71	Corné Beets	1						11/01/2025	11/01/2025
72	Paul de Wet	2						06/12/2025	17/10/2026
73	Handré Pollard	5		21	3		51	06/12/2025	17/10/2026
74	Jeandré Rudolph	5	3				15	06/12/2025	17/10/2026
75	Kade Wolhuter	1						14/12/2025	14/12/2025
76	Sti Sithole	1						14/12/2025	14/12/2025
77	PA van Niekerk	1						14/12/2025	14/12/2025
78	Juann Else	1						14/12/2025	14/12/2025
79	Cheswill Jooste	3	4				20	16/01/2026	17/10/2026
80	Luan Giliomee	1						17/10/2026	17/10/2026
81	Sango Xamlashe	1						17/10/2026	17/10/2026
82	Jaco Grobbelaar	1						17/10/2026	17/10/2026
