= 2000 Currie Cup Top 8 =

Domestic rugby union competition

- Countries: South Africa
- Date: 22 July – 28 October 2000
- Champions: Western Province (30th title)
- Runners-up: Sharks
- Matches played: 8

The 2000 Currie Cup Top 8 was the final stage of the 2000 Currie Cup season, the 62nd season in the competition since it started in 1889. It was won by Western Province, who defeated the Sharks 25–15 in the final at Kings Park Stadium, Durban on 28 October 2000, becoming the first team in the history of the Currie Cup to win 30 titles.

== Competition ==
=== Qualification ===
The fourteen provincial teams were divided into two sections (called Section X and Section Y) during the 2000 Currie Cup qualification tournament. Each team played every other team in their section once. The four top teams in each section qualified to the 2000 Currie Cup Top 8 competition, with all points earned against the other Top 8 teams carried forward to the Top 8. All teams played the teams that qualified from the other section once. Teams who qualified from the same section did not play each other again.

Teams received four points for a win and two points for a draw. Bonus points were awarded to teams that score four or more tries in a game, as well as to teams that lost a match by seven points or less. Teams were ranked by points, then points difference (points scored less points conceded).

The top four teams qualified for the title play-offs. In the semi-finals, the team that finished first had home advantage against the team that finished fourth, while the team that finished second had home advantage against the team that finished third. The winners of these semi-finals played each other in the final, at the home venue of the higher-placed team.

== Teams ==
Location of teams in the 2000 Currie Cup Top 8

2000 Currie Cup Top 8 teams
Team	Sponsored Name	Stadium/s	Sponsored Name
Boland Cavaliers	Boland Cavaliers	Boland Stadium, Wellington	Boland Stadium
Free State Cheetahs	Free State Cheetahs	Free State Stadium, Bloemfontein	Free State Stadium
Golden Lions	Golden Lions	Ellis Park Stadium, Johannesburg	Ellis Park Stadium
Griquas	Nashua Griquas	Griqua Park, Kimberley	Griqua Park
Sharks	Sharks	Kings Park Stadium, Durban	Absa Stadium
Pumas	Mpumalanga Pumas	Johann van Riebeeck Stadium, Witbank	Johann van Riebeeck Stadium
SWD Eagles	Vodacom Eagles	Outeniqua Park, George	Outeniqua Park
Western Province	Fedsure Western Province	Newlands Stadium, Cape Town	Newlands Stadium

=== Log ===
2000 Currie Cup Top 8 log
Pos	Team	Pld	W	D	L	PF	PA	PD	TF	TA	TB	LB	Pts	Qualification
1	Sharks	7	6	0	1	267	159	+108	33	14	5	1	30	2000 Currie Cup semi-final playoffs
2	Western Province	7	6	0	1	282	205	+77	31	23	5	0	29	2000 Currie Cup semi-final playoffs
3	Golden Lions	7	4	1	2	294	215	+79	37	25	6	0	24	2000 Currie Cup semi-final playoffs
4	Free State Cheetahs	7	3	1	3	236	242	−6	26	28	5	0	19	2000 Currie Cup semi-final playoffs
5	Boland Cavaliers	7	3	0	4	201	246	−45	30	32	4	1	17	
6	SWD Eagles	7	3	0	4	206	214	−8	27	28	3	0	15	
7	Pumas	7	2	0	5	213	304	−91	28	40	4	0	12	
8	Griquas	7	0	0	7	181	295	−114	21	43	3	3	6	

Rules for classification: 4 points for a win; 2 points for a draw; 1 bonus point for a loss by seven points or less; 1 bonus point for scoring four or more tries in a match

The following playing records were brought forward from the 2000 Currie Cup qualification series:

Playing records brought forward
Pos	Team	Pld	W	D	L	PF	PA	PD	TF	TA	TB	LB	Pts
1	Western Province	3	3	0	0	119	85	+34	14	10	10	2	24
2	Sharks	3	2	0	1	95	67	+28	11	5	5	2	15
3	SWD Eagles	3	2	0	1	106	79	+27	14	10	10	2	20
4	Golden Lions	3	1	1	1	109	118	−9	12	16	16	3	25
5	Free State Cheetahs	3	1	1	1	86	98	−12	9	12	12	2	20
6	Pumas	3	1	0	2	94	109	−15	15	14	14	3	21
7	Boland Cavaliers	3	1	0	2	78	85	−7	11	10	10	1	15
8	Griquas	3	0	0	3	69	115	−46	8	17	17	1	18

=== Results ===
==== Round one ====
22 September 2000	Sharks	49–13	SWD Eagles	Kings Park Stadium, Durban
19:15	Try: Rodger Smith; AJ Venter; Albert van den Berg; Trevor Halstead; Shaun Sowerby; Ollie le Roux (2); Con: Gaffie du Toit (4); Pen: Gaffie du Toit (2); Drop: Stefan Terblanche	Scoreboard; Report	Try: Rickus Lubbe; Darryl Coeries; Pen: Rynhard van As	Referee: Carl Spannenberg

23 September 2000	Free State Cheetahs	50–32	Griquas	Free State Stadium, Bloemfontein
15:00	Try: Michael Horak; André van Niekerk; André Venter; Wylie Human; Ferdie Wesso penalty try Con: Kennedy Tsimba (4); Pen: Kennedy Tsimba (4)	Scoreboard; Report	Try: Pierre Uys; Boeta Wessels (2); Tom Cameron; Con: Boeta Wessels (3); Pen: Boeta Wessels (2)	Referee: Jonathan Kaplan

23 September 2000	Golden Lions	28–51	Western Province	Ellis Park Stadium, Johannesburg
17:05	Try: Japie Mulder; Rassie Erasmus; Jannie van der Walt; Con: Louis Koen (2); Pen: Louis Koen (3)	Scoreboard; Report	Try: Adri Badenhorst (2); Toks van der Linde; Breyton Paulse; Hottie Louw; Con: Dan van Zyl; Braam van Straaten (5); Pen: Dan van Zyl; Percy Montgomery (2); Cards: Robbie Fleck (yellow card); Toks van der Linde (yellow card)	Referee: André Watson

24 September 2000	Boland Cavaliers	31–22	Pumas	Boland Stadium, Wellington
15:10	Try: Vion Wium; Wayne Julies; Dale Santon; John Daniels; Con: Antonius Verhoeven (4); Pen: Antonius Verhoeven	Scoreboard; Report	Try: Gavin Passens; Frikkie Welsh; Giscard Pieters; Con: Jorrie Kruger (2); Pen: Jorrie Kruger	Referee: Tappe Henning

==== Round two ====
29 September 2000	Pumas	47–32	Free State Cheetahs	Johann van Riebeeck Stadium, Witbank
15:10	Try: Gavin Passens; Charl Els; Frikkie Welsh (2); Geoff Appleford; Con: Jorrie Kruger (5); Pen: Jorrie Kruger (3); Drop: Jacques Benade; Cards: Bennie Nortjé (yellow card)	Scoreboard; Report	Try: Daan Human; Kennedy Tsimba; JP du Toit; Jaco Coetzee; Con: Kennedy Tsimba (3); Pen: Kennedy Tsimba; MJ Smith

30 September 2000	Western Province	19–28	Sharks	Newlands Stadium, Cape Town
17:00	Try: Pieter Dixon; Con: Percy Montgomery; Pen: Braam van Straaten (3); Dan van Zyl	Scoreboard; Report	Try: Rodger Smith; Stefan Terblanche; Craig Davidson; Con: Gaffie du Toit (2); Pen: Gaffie du Toit (3)	Referee: Mark Lawrence

30 September 2000	Griquas	41–44	Boland Cavaliers	Griqua Park, Kimberley
	Try: Skolla Scholtz; Christof Lötter; Dirkie Strydom; Tom Cameron; Riaan Olckers; Thando Manana; Con: Edrich Lubbe (4); Pen: Edrich Lubbe	Scoreboard; Report	Try: Vion Wium (2); Antonius Verhoeven; Wayne Julies (2); Jan Ackermann; Marius Joubert; Heino Senekal; Con: Antonius Verhoeven (2)

1 October 2000	SWD Eagles	17–34	Golden Lions	Outeniqua Park, George
15:10	Try: Rudi Keil; Johan Wasserman; Con: Theo Jansen van Rensburg; Rynhard van As; Pen: Theo Jansen van Rensburg	Scoreboard; Report	Try: Dean Hall; Rassie Erasmus; Hennie le Roux; Louis Koen; Con: Louis Koen (4); Pen: Louis Koen (2)	Referee: Tappe Henning

==== Round three ====
6 October 2000	Sharks	60–27	Pumas	Kings Park Stadium, Durban
	Try: Warren Brosnihan; Trevor Halstead; Brad McLeod-Henderson; Gaffie du Toit; Chris Rossouw (2); Roger Smith; Stephen Brink; Con: Butch James (3); Gaffie du Toit (3); Drop: Stefan Terblanche	Scoreboard; Report	Try: Clarke Roberts; Gavin Passens; Paul Hoffmann; Con: Jorrie Kruger (3); Pen: Jorrie Kruger (2)

7 October 2000	Boland Cavaliers	22–52	SWD Eagles	Boland Stadium, Wellington
14:50	Try: Jannie Coetzee; Antonius Verhoeven; John Daniels; Con: Antonius Verhoeven (2); Pen: Antonius Verhoeven	Scoreboard; Report	Try: Theo Jansen van Rensburg; Manie du Toit; Johan Kapp; Lodewyk Hattingh; Trevor Hall; Rickus Lubbe; Stephen Aylward; Con: Theo Jansen van Rensburg (7); Pen: Theo Jansen van Rensburg

7 October 2000	Free State Cheetahs	38–47	Western Province	Free State Stadium, Bloemfontein
17:05	Try: Braam Els; André Venter; Wylie Human; Con: MJ Smith; Pen: MJ Smith (7)	Scoreboard; Report	Try: Breyton Paulse (2); Percy Montgomery; Pieter Rossouw; Corné Krige; Con: Braam van Straaten (5); Pen: Braam van Straaten (3); Drop: Percy Montgomery	Referee: Tappe Henning

8 October 2000	Golden Lions	51–6	Griquas	Ellis Park Stadium, Johannesburg
15:00	Try: Hennie le Roux; Grant Bartle; Japie Mulder (2); Dean Hall (2); Jannie van der Walt; Walter Minnaar; Con: Hennie le Roux (4); Pen: Hennie le Roux	Scoreboard; Report	Pen: Edrich Lubbe (2)	Referee: Mark Lawrence

==== Round four ====
13 October 2000	SWD Eagles	18–30	Free State Cheetahs	Outeniqua Park, George
	Try: Kleinjan Tromp; Rickus Lubbe; Con: Rynhard van As; Pen: Rynhard van As; Manie du Toit	Scoreboard; Report	Try: Joe Beukes; Hendro Scholtz; Ferdie Wesso; Jimmy Powell; Con: MJ Smith; Conrad Barnard; Pen: MJ Smith (2)

14 October 2000	Pumas	23–72	Golden Lions	Johann van Riebeeck Stadium, Witbank
15:00	Try: Riaan Potgieter; Bennie Nortjé; Con: Jacques Benade; Kat de Jager; Pen: Jacques Benade (2); Drop: Jacques Benade; Cards: Sias Wagner (yellow card)	Scoreboard; Report	Try: Russel Winter; Piet Krause (2); Hennie le Roux (2); Chester Williams; Conrad Jantjes; Dean Hall; Walter Minnaar; Grant Bartle; Con: Louis Koen (8); Pen: Louis Koen (2)	Referee: Tappe Henning

14 October 2000	Griquas	33–35	Sharks	Griqua Park, Kimberley
17:00	Try: Dries Scholtz; George Binikos; Dirkie Strydom; Con: Dirkie Strydom (3); Pen: Dirkie Strydom (4)	Scoreboard; Report	Try: Stephen Brink (2); Stefan Terblanche; Rodger Smith; Con: Gaffie du Toit (3); Pen: Gaffie du Toit (3)	Referee: Mark Lawrence

14 October 2000	Western Province	46–26	Boland	Newlands Stadium, Cape Town
17:00	Try: Percy Montgomery (2); Adri Badenhorst; Braam van Straaten (2); Jeffrey Stevens; Con: Braam van Straaten (5); Pen: Braam van Straaten (2)	Scoreboard; Report	Try: Allen Williams; Antonius Verhoeven; Martin van Schalkwyk; Randile Julies; Con: Connie Malherbe (3)

==== Semi-finals ====
21 October 2000	Western Province	43–22	Golden Lions	Newlands Stadium, Cape Town
14:30	Try: Breyton Paulse (2); Pieter Rossouw; Hendrik Gerber; Con: Braam van Straaten (4); Pen: Braam van Straaten (5)	Scoreboard; Report	Try: André Vos (2); Hennie le Roux; Chester Williams; Con: Louis Koen (2); Pen: Louis Koen	Referee: Jonathan Kaplan

21 October 2000	Sharks	29–15	Free State Cheetahs	Kings Park Stadium, Durban
17:05	Try: Joe Gillingham; Craig Davidson; Butch James; Con: Gaffie du Toit; Pen: Gaffie du Toit (4)	Scoreboard; Report	Try: Wylie Human (2); Con: MJ Smith; Pen: MJ Smith	Referee: Tappe Henning

==== Final ====
28 October 2000	Sharks	15–25	Western Province	Kings Park Stadium, Durban
17:05	Pen: Gaffie du Toit (5)	Scoreboard; Report	Try: Pieter Rossouw; Breyton Paulse (2); Con: Braam van Straaten (2); Pen: Braam van Straaten (2)	Referee: André Watson

2000 Absa Currie Cup
Champions

30th title

== See also ==
- 2000 Currie Cup qualification
- 2000 Bankfin Cup
