= 2000 Bankfin Cup =

Domestic rugby union competition

- Countries: South Africa
- Date: 22 September – 20 October 2000
- Champions: Blue Bulls (1st title)
- Runners-up: Mighty Elephants
- Matches played: 12
- Tries scored: 109 (average 9.1 per match)

The 2000 Bankfin Cup was the second tier competition in the 62nd Currie Cup season since it started in 1889. It was won by the Blue Bulls, who defeated the Mighty Elephants 41–20 in the final.

== Competition ==
=== Qualification ===
The fourteen provincial teams were divided into two sections (called Section X and Section Y) during the 2000 Currie Cup qualification tournament. Each team played every other team in their section once. The three bottom-placed teams in each section qualified to the 2000 Bankfin Cup competition, with all points earned against the other Bankfin Cup teams carried forward to the Bankfin Cup. All teams played the teams that qualified from the other section once. Teams who qualified from the same section did not play each other again.

Teams received four points for a win and two points for a draw. Bonus points were awarded to teams that score four or more tries in a game, as well as to teams that lost a match by seven points or less. Teams were ranked by points, then points difference (points scored less points conceded).

The top four teams qualified for the title play-offs. In the semi-finals, the team that finished first had home advantage against the team that finished fourth, while the team that finished second had home advantage against the team that finished third. The winners of these semi-finals played each other in the final, at the home venue of the higher-placed team.

== Teams ==
Location of teams in the 2000 Bankfin Cup

=== Team Listing ===
2000 Bankfin Cup teams
Team	Sponsored Name	Stadium/s	Sponsored Name
Blue Bulls	Blue Bulls	Loftus Versfeld, Pretoria	Minolta Loftus
Border Bulldogs	Border Bulldogs	Waverley Park, East London	Waverley Park
Falcons	Falcons	Bosman Stadium, Brakpan	Bosman Stadium
Griffons	Griffons	North West Stadium, Welkom	North West Stadium
Leopards	Leopards	Olën Park, Potchefstroom	Olën Park
Mighty Elephants	Mighty Elephants	Boet Erasmus Stadium, Port Elizabeth	Telkom Park

=== Log ===
2000 Bankfin Cup log
Pos	Team	Pld	W	D	L	PF	PA	PD	TF	TA	TB	LB	Pts	Qualification
1	Mighty Elephants	5	4	0	1	214	157	+57	31	20	5	0	21	Qualified for the semi-final play-offs
2	Blue Bulls	5	3	0	2	205	178	+27	25	20	4	2	18	Qualified for the semi-final play-offs
3	Falcons	5	3	0	2	128	131	−3	19	19	3	1	16	Qualified for the semi-final play-offs
4	Leopards	5	2	0	3	166	170	−4	22	23	4	2	14	Qualified for the semi-final play-offs
5	Border Bulldogs	5	2	0	3	122	166	−44	15	23	2	1	11	
6	Griffons	5	1	0	4	176	209	−33	20	27	4	1	9	

Rules for classification:
- 4 points for a win
- 2 points for a draw
- 1 bonus point for a loss by seven points or less
- 1 bonus point for scoring four or more tries in a match

The following playing records were brought forward from the 2000 Currie Cup qualification series:

Playing records brought forward
Pos	Team	Pld	W	D	L	PF	PA	PD	TF	TA	TB	LB	Pts
1	Mighty Elephants	2	2	0	0	82	49	+33	11	5	2	0	10
2	Border Bulldogs	2	2	0	0	62	56	+6	7	7	1	0	9
3	Blue Bulls	2	1	0	1	61	59	+2	7	6	1	1	6
4	Falcons	2	1	0	1	50	58	−8	8	9	1	0	5
5	Leopards	2	0	0	2	66	74	−8	8	9	1	2	3
6	Griffons	2	0	0	2	61	86	−25	7	12	1	0	1

Source: 2000 Currie Cup

=== Results ===
==== Round one ====
22 September 2000	Falcons	36–33	Blue Bulls	Brakpan
	Try: Joe Esterhuysen; Piet Matthys; Pieter Jordaan; Adrian Jacobs; Con: Pieter Jordaan (2); Pen: Pieter Jordaan (4)	Report	Try: McNeil Hendricks (2); Marius Goosen; Joost van der Westhuizen; Anton Leonard; Con: Franco Smith (4)

23 September 2000	Griffons	31–44	Leopards	North West Stadium, Welkom
	Try: Jacques Juries; Kees Lensing; Jacques Steyn; Renier de Jager; Con: Eric Herbert (4); Pen: Eric Herbert	Report	Try: Keith Meyer (3); Dian Kruger (2); Hennie Pieterse; Con: Roland de Marigny; Ian Noble (3); Pen: Roland de Marigny; Drop: Ian Noble

23 September 2000	Mighty Elephants	48–14	Border Bulldogs	Telkom Park, Port Elizabeth
	Try: Rhys Botha (2); Ricardo Loubscher; Henry Pedro; Wonga Joka; Barry Pinnock; Chad Alcock; André Fourie; Con: André Fourie (4)	Report	Try: David de Kock; Fergus Kennedy; Con: Greg Miller (2)

==== Round two ====
29 September 2000	Leopards	30–27	Falcons	Olën Park, Potchefstroom
	Try: Johan Calitz (2); Len van Riet; Julian Ruiters; Con: Ian Noble (2); Pen: Ian Noble (2)	Report	Try: Ettienne Botha (2); Emile de Beer; Piet Matthys; Con: Pieter Jordaan (2); Pen: Pieter Jordaan

30 September 2000	Border Bulldogs	36–47	Griffons	Waverley Park, East London
	Try: Ian Fihlani (2); Tjaart Coetzee; Josh Fowles; Fergus Kennedy; Con: Greg Miller (4); Pen: Greg Miller	Report	Try: Lukas van Biljon (2); Sasha Marrot; Jacques Steyn; Albertus van Buuren; Con: Eric Herbert (5); Pen: Eric Herbert (4)

30 September 2000	Mighty Elephants	46–68	Blue Bulls	Telkom Park, Port Elizabeth
	Try: Rhys Botha; Andries Fourie (2); Johan de Kock; Ricardo Loubscher; Henry Pedro; Con: André Fourie (5); Pen: André Fourie (2)	Report	Try: Jaco Barnard; Anton Leonard; Jacques Olivier (3); Wium Basson; Danie Rossouw; Marius Goosen; Joost van der Westhuizen; Con: Franco Smith (7); Pen: Franco Smith (3)

==== Round three ====
6 October 2000	Border Bulldogs	10–15	Falcons	Waverley Park, East London
	Try: Dale Heidtmann; Con: Hein van Vuuren; Pen: Hein van Vuuren	Report	Try: Deon de Kock; Kurt Steinbach; Skipper Badenhorst

7 October 2000	Blue Bulls	43–37	Griffons	Loftus Versfeld, Pretoria
	Try: McNeil Hendricks (2); Jaco Barnard; Brendell Brandt; Con: Casper Steyn; Pen: Casper Steyn (4); Marius Goosen (2); Franco Smith	Report	Try: Johnny Burger; Sasha Marot (2); Willie Nagel; Con: Eric Herbert (4); Pen: Eric Herbert (3)

7 October 2000	Mighty Elephants	38–26	Leopards	Telkom Park, Port Elizabeth
	Try: Andries Fourie (2); John Nelson; Chrisjan van der Westhuysen (2); Henry Pedro; Con: André Fourie (4)	Report	Try: Casper Oosthuizen; Johann Smith; Bloues Volschenk; Basil de Coning; Con: Ian Noble; Solly Goosen (2)

==== Semi-finals ====
14 October 2000	Blue Bulls	57–27	Falcons	Loftus Versfeld, Pretoria
	Try: Franco Smith; Anton Leonard (2); Joost van der Westhuizen (2); Brendell Brandt; Jacques Olivier (2); Con: Franco Smith (7); Pen: Franco Smith	Report	Try: Ettienne Botha; Günder Williamson; Peet van Deventer; Con: Pieter Jordaan (3); Pen: Pieter Jordaan (2)

14 October 2000	Mighty Elephants	39–21	Leopards	Telkom Park, Port Elizabeth
15:30	Try: Jacques Greeff (2); Heinrich Stride (2); Andries Fourie; Con: André Fourie (4); Pen: André Fourie (2)	Report	Try: Johan Calitz; Johann Smith; Con: Basil de Coning; Pen: Solly Goosen (2); Basil de Coning

==== Final ====
20 October 2000	Mighty Elephants	20–41	Blue Bulls	Telkom Park, Port Elizabeth
	Try: Vorster Venter; Tobie de Jager; Con: André Fourie; Richard Jordaan; Pen: André Fourie (2)	Report	Try: Jannie Brooks; Franco Smith; McNeil Hendricks (3); Con: Franco Smith (2); Pen: Franco Smith (4)
