= Mabeta =

Mabeta may refer to:

== Places ==
- Mabeta, Syria a town in Afrin district, Syria.

== Persons ==
- Fudge Mabeta

== Organisations ==
- MABETA Magyar Baromfi-egészségügyi Társaság, Hungarian Poultry Health Association. A veterinary association founded in the 1960-s to support and educate veterinary and agricultural professionals involved in poultry health and production.
