= Maidza =

Maidza is a surname. Notable people with the surname include:

- David Maidza (born 1971), Zimbabwean rugby union player and coach
- Tkay Maidza (born 1995), Zimbabwean-born Australian singer-songwriter and rapper

Maidza is from the Shona language loosely translated meaning "You have tried"
