= 2000 Currie Cup =

Domestic rugby union competition

- Countries: South Africa
- Date: 21 July – 28 October 2000
- Champions: Western Province (30th title)
- Runners-up: Sharks
- Matches played: 73

The 2000 Currie Cup was the 62nd season of the Currie Cup, South Africa's premier domestic rugby union competition, since it started in 1889. The competition was known as the Bankfin Currie Cup for sponsorship reasons and was contested from 21 July to 28 October 2000.

The top eight sides from an initial qualification stage competed for the premier Currie Cup, while the bottom six sides from the qualification stage competed for the secondary Bankfin Cup. The Currie Cup was won by Western Province for the 30th time in their history; they beat the Sharks 25–15 in the final played on 28 October 2000. The Bankfin Cup was won by the Blue Bulls for the first time; they beat the Mighty Elephants 41–20 in the final played on 20 October 2000.

== Competition rules and information ==
There were fourteen participating teams in the 2000 Currie Cup, all of them starting the season in the 2000 Currie Cup qualification stage. At this stage, the teams were divided into two sections (Section X and Section Y) and played all the other teams in their section once, either home or away.

The top four teams from both sections qualified to the 2000 Currie Cup Top 8 stage, carrying forward the results they got against their three fellow qualifiers. In the Top 8, they then faced all the teams from the opposite section once, either home and away.

The bottom three teams from both qualification sections qualified to the 2000 Bankfin Cup stage, carrying forward the results they got against their two fellow qualifiers. In the Bankfin Cup, they then faced all the teams from the opposite section once, either home and away.

In all three stages of the competition, teams received four points for a win and two points for a draw. Bonus points were awarded to teams that scored four or more tries in a game, as well as to teams that lost a match by seven points or less. Teams were ranked by log points, then points difference (points scored less points conceded).

At the end of the Top 8 and Bankfin Cup stages, the top four teams qualified for the title play-offs. In the semi-finals, the team that finished first had home advantage against the team that finished fourth, while the team that finished second had home advantage against the team that finished third. The winners of these semi-finals advanced to the final, at the home venue of the higher-placed team.

== Teams ==
Location of teams in the 2000 Currie Cup

=== Team listing ===
2000 Currie Cup teams
Team	Sponsored Name	Stadium/s	Sponsored Name
Blue Bulls	Blue Bulls	Loftus Versfeld, Pretoria	Minolta Loftus
Boland Cavaliers	Boland Cavaliers	Boland Stadium, Wellington	Boland Stadium
Border Bulldogs	Border Bulldogs	Waverley Park, East London	Waverley Park
Falcons	MTN Falcons	Bosman Stadium, Brakpan	Bosman Stadium
Free State Cheetahs	Free State Cheetahs	Free State Stadium, Bloemfontein	Vodacom Park
Golden Lions	Golden Lions	Ellis Park Stadium, Johannesburg	Ellis Park Stadium
Griffons	Griffons	North West Stadium, Welkom	North West Stadium
Griqualand West	Griqualand West	Griqua Park, Kimberley	ABSA Park
Leopards	Leopards	Olën Park, Potchefstroom	Olën Park
Mighty Elephants	Callmore Mighty Elephants	PE Stadium, Port Elizabeth	PE Stadium
Mpumalanga Pumas	Mpumalanga Pumas	Johann van Riebeeck Stadium, Witbank	Johann van Riebeeck Stadium
Sharks	Natal Sharks	Kings Park Stadium, Durban	Kings Park Stadium
SWD Eagles	SWD Eagles	Outeniqua Park, George	Outeniqua Park
Western Province	Fedsure Western Province	Newlands Stadium, Cape Town	Fedsure Park Newlands

=== Changes from 1999 ===
Rather than the single division used in 1999, the 2000 Currie Cup competition was divided into two stages: an initial qualification stage took place, followed by two second-stage competitions: the Currie Cup for the top eight teams from the qualification stage and the Bankfin Cup for the bottom six teams.

There was a name change prior to this season:

- North West were renamed the Leopards

== Qualification ==
The Boland Cavaliers, Free State Cheetahs, Golden Lions and Sharks qualified for the Top 8 stage after finishing in the top four teams in Section X, while Griquas, Pumas, SWD Eagles and Western Province qualified for the Top 8 stage after finishing in the top four teams in Section Y.

The Falcons, Griffons and Mighty Elephants qualified for the Bankfin Cup after finishing in the bottom three in Section X, while the Border Bulldogs, Blue Bulls and Leopards qualified for the Bankfin Cup after finishing in the bottom three in Section Y.

== Top 8 ==
The Free State Cheetahs, Golden Lions, Sharks and Western Province finished in the top four of the Top 8 stage to qualify for the semi-finals. After winning their respective semi-finals, the Natal Sharks and Western Province played in the final, which Western Province won 25–15 in Durban.

== Bankfin Cup ==
The Blue Bulls, Falcons, Leopards and Mighty Elephants finished in the top four of the Bankfin Cup stage to qualify for the semi-finals. After winning their respective semi-finals, the Blue Bulls and Mighty Elephants played in the final, which the Blue Bulls won 41–20 in Port Elizabeth.

== Honours ==
The honour roll for the 2000 Currie Cup was:

2000 Currie Cup honours
Currie Cup champions:	Western Province (30th title)
Bankfin Cup champions:	Blue Bulls (1st title)
