= Edrich Lubbe (rugby union) =

South African rugby union player

- Born: Johan Martin Frederick Lubbe; 29 July 1969 (age 57) Caledon, Western Cape
- Height: 1.80 m (5 ft 11 in)
- Weight: 90 kg (198 lb)
- School: Robertson High School
- University: Stellenbosch University

Rugby union career
- Position(s): Centre, Flyhalf
Provincial / State sides
Years	Team	Apps	(Points)
1991–1993	Western Province	14	
1994–1995	Free State Cheetahs	17	
1996–2001	Griquas	114	
Super Rugby
Years	Team	Apps	(Points)
1997	Gauteng Lions	4	(22)
1998	Cats	6	(5)
International career
Years	Team	Apps	(Points)
1997	South Africa	2	(17)

Johan Martin Frederick "Edrich" Lubbe (born 29 July 1969) is a South African former rugby union player.

== Playing career ==
Lubbe matriculated at the Robertson High School and represented Boland at the annual Craven Week tournament in 1987. In 1990 he enrolled at the University of Stellenbosch and represented Maties on the rugby field. He made his senior provincial debut for Western Province in 1991 as the centre partner of Chester Williams. In 1994 he moved to the Free State Cheetahs and in 1996 to Griquas.

Lubbe played two test matches for the Springboks. His debut was against Tonga at Newlands in 1997, following with the first test against the touring British Lions team, also at Newlands.

=== Test history ===
No.	Opponents	Results (SA 1st)	Position	Points	Dates	Venue
1.	Tonga	74–10	Centre	14 (7 conversions)	10 Jun 1997	Newlands, Cape Town
2.	British Lions	16–25	Centre	3 (1 penalty)	21 Jun 1997	Newlands, Cape Town

== See also ==
- List of South Africa national rugby union players – Springbok no. 650
