= Sebastian Lombard =

South African rugby union player

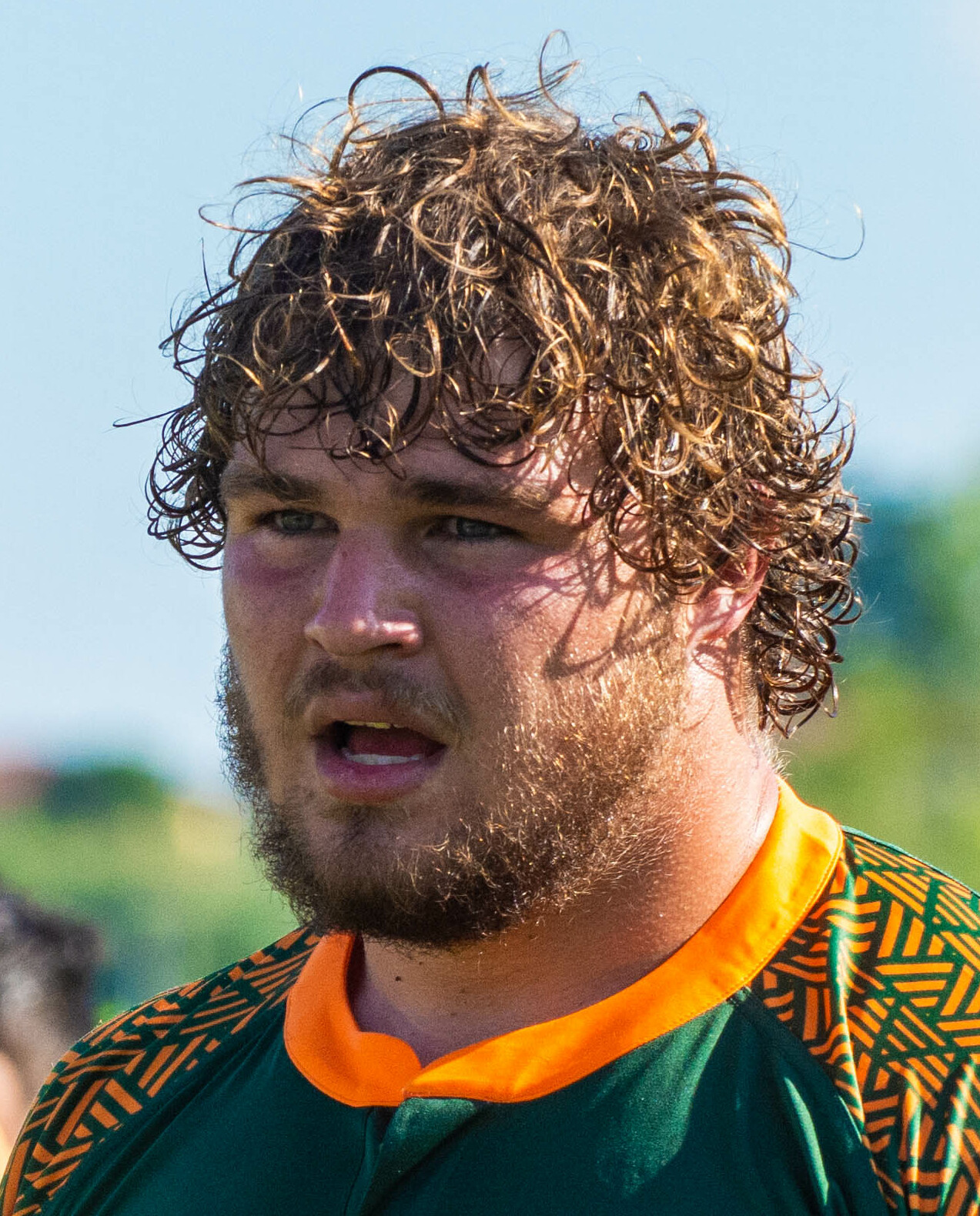
- Born: 6 October 2002 (age 24) South Africa
- Height: 190 cm (6 ft 3 in)
- Weight: 126 kg (278 lb; 19 st 12 lb)
- School: Paarl Boys' High School

Rugby union career
- Position: Prop
- Current team: Lions / Golden Lions
Senior career
Years	Team	Apps	(Points)
2022–2024	Blue Bulls		
2023–2025	Bulls	6	(0)
2025–	Golden Lions	5	(0)
2025–	Lions	11	(0)
- Correct as of 26 October 2026
International career
Years	Team	Apps	(Points)
2022	South Africa U20	2	(0)
- Correct as of 26 October 2025

Sebastian Lombard (born 6 October 2002) is a South African rugby union player, who plays for the Lions and Golden Lions. His preferred position is prop.

== Early career ==
Lombard attended Paarl Boys' High School where he played for the first XV and represented South Africa at youth levels in 2018 and 2020. His performances for the school earned him selection for the South Africa U20 side.

== Professional career ==
Lombard represented the Bulls at youth level, winning Bulls U20 forward of the year in 2022. He made his Currie Cup debut for the Blue Bulls in 2022, and played again in 2023 and 2024 before debuting for the Bulls in the 2022–23 European Rugby Champions Cup. He would go on to make a further 5 appearances for the Bulls, before joining the Lions in 2025, first playing for the Golden Lions in the 2025 Currie Cup Premier Division, before debuting in the United Rugby Championship in October.
