= Adri Badenhorst =

South African rugby union player

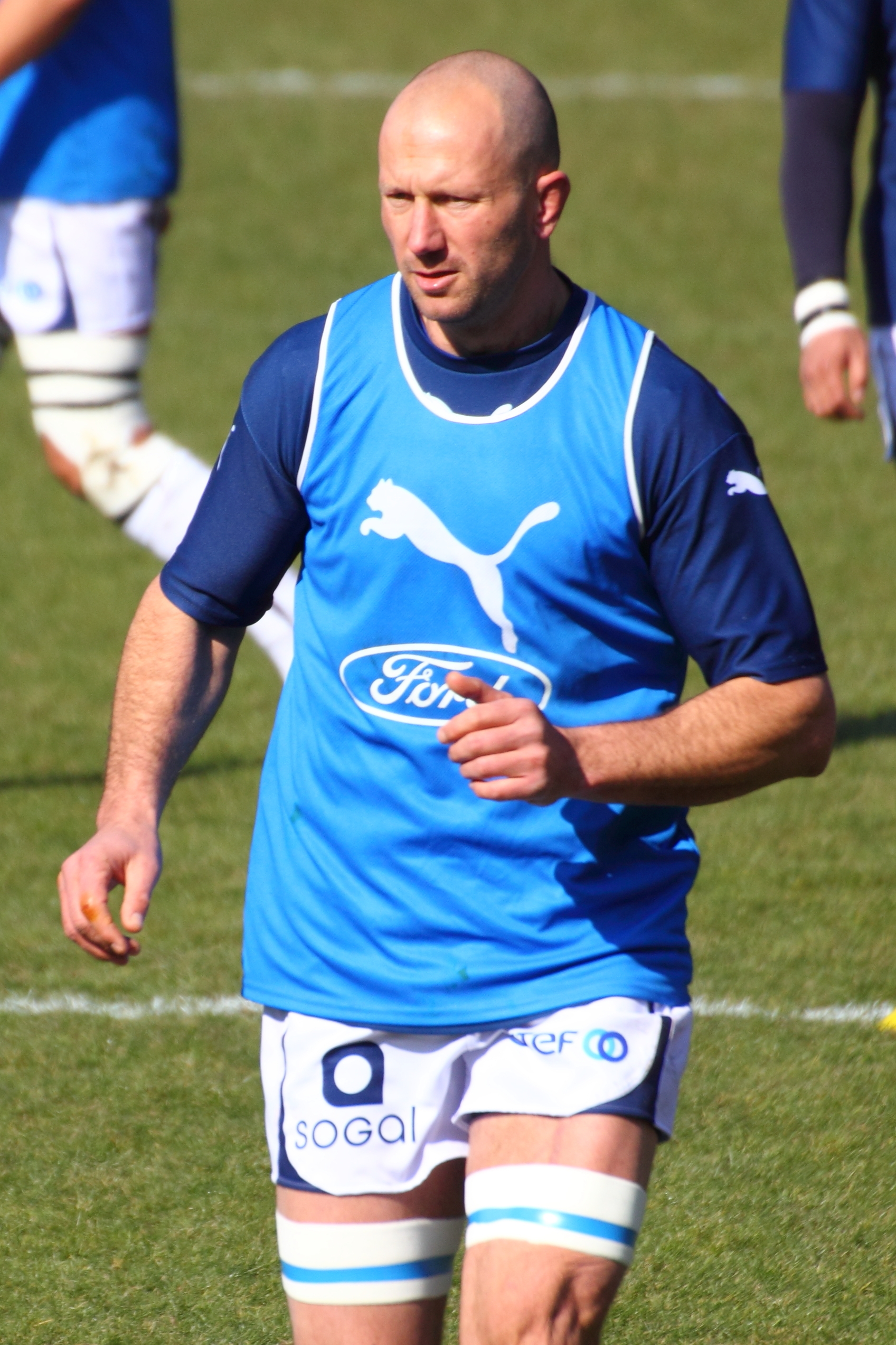
- Badenhorst in 2012
- Born: Adriaan Johannes Badenhorst; 18 July 1978 (age 48) Prieska, Cape Province
- Height: 1.97 m (6 ft 6 in)
- Weight: 107 kg (236 lb)
- School: Prieska High School, Prieska
- University: Stellenbosch University

Rugby union career
- Position(s): Loose-forward, Lock
Senior career
Years	Team	Apps	(Points)
2006–2012	Agen	169	(80)
Provincial / State sides
Years	Team	Apps	(Points)
1999–2005	Western Province	77	(75)
Super Rugby
Years	Team	Apps	(Points)
2001–2006	Stormers	52	(30)
International career
Years	Team	Apps	(Points)
2000	South Africa (tour)	1	(0)
2001	South Africa 'A'	2	(0)

Adriaan Johannes Badenhorst (born 18 July 1978) is a South African former rugby union player.

== Playing career ==
Badenhorst matriculated in Prieska and in 1997 enrolled at Stellenbosch University. He played for the university's under 19 and under 20 teams and in 1997 was selected for the Western Province senior team. He was a member of the Western Province team that won the Currie Cup in 2000. Badenhorst played more than 50 matches for Western Province and the Stormers and in 2006 he signed for Agen.

Badenhorst toured with the Springboks to Argentina, Britain and Ireland in 2000 and played in one tour match. In 2001 Badenhorst toured with the South Africa 'A' team to Europe.

== See also ==
- List of South Africa national rugby union players – Springbok no. 712
