= Muller Uys =

South African rugby union player

- Full name: Hendrik Muller Uys
- Born: 2 September 1998 (age 28) Stellenbosch, South Africa
- Height: 1.91 m (6 ft 3 in)
- Weight: 107 kg (236 lb)

Rugby union career
- Position: Flanker / Number 8
- Current team: Bulls
Senior career
Years	Team	Apps	(Points)
2019	Blue Bulls XV	6	(10)
2019–	Bulls	8	(0)
2020–	Blue Bulls	17	(5)
2025	Kamaishi Seawaves	6	(0)
- Correct as of 23 July 2022
International career
Years	Team	Apps	(Points)
2017–2018	South Africa Under-20	8	(15)
- Correct as of 3 March 2021

Hendrik Muller Uys (born 2 September 1998) is a South African rugby union player for the Bulls in Super Rugby . His regular position is flanker or number 8.

He made his Super Rugby debut for the Bulls in their round 6 match against the Highlanders in March 2020, starting at number 8. He signed for the Bulls Super Rugby side for the 2020 Super Rugby season.
