= Friedrich Lombard =

South African rugby union player

- Born: 4 March 1979 (age 47) Frankfort, Free State
- Height: 1.87 m (6 ft 2 in)
- Weight: 90 kg (198 lb)
- School: Hoërskool Wilgerivier, Frankfort
- University: University of the Free State

Rugby union career
- Position(s): Wing, Fullback
Provincial / State sides
Years	Team	Apps	(Points)
1999–2005	Free State	78	(155)
Super Rugby
Years	Team	Apps	(Points)
2001	Bulls	11	(20)
2002–2003	Cats	12	(10)
International career
Years	Team	Apps	(Points)
2002	South Africa	2	(0)

Friedrich Lombard (born 4 March 1979) is a South African former rugby union player.

== Playing career ==
Lombard was born and raised in the Free State town of Frankfort. He played Craven Week for Northern Free State for the South African Schools team in 1997. After school, he studied at the University of the Free State.

He made his senior provincial debut for Free State in 1999 and played Super rugby for the Bulls and the Cats. Lombard made his test match debut for the Springboks against Scotland at the Murrayfield, Edinburgh in 2002. Following the Scotland test, he also played in the test against England.

=== Test history ===
No.	Opponents	Results (SA 1st)	Position	Tries	Dates	Venue
1.	Scotland	6–21	Wing		16 Nov 2002	Murrayfield, Edinburgh
2.	England	3–53	Wing		23 Nov 2002	Twickenham, London

== See also ==
- List of South Africa national rugby union players – Springbok no. 736
