= Chad Alcock =

South African rugby union player

- Full name: Chad David Alcock
- Born: 9 January 1973 (age 53) Port Elizabeth, South Africa
- School: Alexander Road High School

Rugby union career
- Position: Scrum-half
Provincial / State sides
Years	Team	Apps	(Points)
- Eastern Province
- North Harbour
Super Rugby
Years	Team	Apps	(Points)
- Sharks
- Cats
International career
Years	Team	Apps	(Points)
1998	South Africa		

Chad David Alcock (born 9 January 1973) is a South African former professional rugby union player.

== Biography ==
Alcock is one of twins and was born in Port Elizabeth. He attended Alexander Road High School and was a South African under-18 representative player. Outside of rugby, Alcock made custom fishing rods for the family business.

A diminutive scrum-half, Alcock was known for his try-scoring abilities and skills in wet conditions. He competed for Eastern Province for nine seasons and in 1998 toured with the Springboks, featuring in four mid-week fixtures. At Super 12 level, Alcock had stints with the Sharks and Cats. He played in New Zealand for North Harbour in 2003.

== See also ==
- List of South Africa national rugby union players
