= Carl Spannenberg =

South African rugby referee

Carl Moses Spannenberg (10 August 1968 – 11 November 2001) was a South African rugby union referee. He was one of the first four professional referees appointed in South Africa. As well as officiating in South Africa, he also took charge of 10 matches in Super Rugby between 1996 and 2001 and three tests between 1996 and 1998. In May 2001, Spannenberg was charged with "driving under the influence of alcohol". He was also accused of sexual assault against a Griquas player following a Vodacom Cup match against the Blue Bulls in April 2001. On 11 November 2001, he went on a boat ride with friends at Zeekoevlei. He reportedly jumped from the boat and drowned; a friend who almost drowned trying to save him was rescued by divers and taken to hospital. Spannenberg's body was found three days later. A minute's silence was held at the Durban Sevens tournament at which he was due to officiate the following weekend.
