= David Maidza =

- Full name: David Farai Maidza
- Born: 10 April 1971 (age 55) Chipinge, Zimbabwe
- Height: 1.70 m (5 ft 7 in)
- Weight: 80 kg (12 st 8 lb; 176 lb)
- School: St. John's College (Harare)

Rugby union career
- Current team: Eastern Province Kings
Senior career
Years	Team	Apps	(Points)
1996–2001	Border Bulldogs		
1999	Sharks		
- Correct as of 6 November 2013
International career
Years	Team	Apps	(Points)
1993–1994	Zimbabwe	5	(5)
Coaching career
- Years: Team
- 2002–2003: Border Bulldogs (technical adviser)
- 2003–2007: Cheetahs (assistant)
- 2008–2009: Border Bulldogs
- 2010–2012: Eastern Province Kings (assistant)
- 2013: Eastern Province Kings
- 2014–2018: NMMU Madibaz

David Maidza (born 10 April 1971 in Chipinge) is a former Zimbabwean rugby union player and currently the head coach of the NMMU Madibaz Varsity Cup team. His usual playing position was centre or winger.

== Career ==
=== Playing career ===
He started his playing career in his native Zimbabwe, where he played for the national Under-21 and Under-23 teams. In 1993, he earned a call-up to the national team, where he made his debut against an Arabian Gulf team in a qualifier for the 1995 Rugby World Cup. He made a total of 5 appearances in 1993 and 1994.

In 1996, he moved to South African Currie Cup team Border Bulldogs, where he remained until 2004. He was also included in the Sharks squad for the 1999 Super 12 season.

=== Coaching career ===
After his playing career ended in 2001, he became a technical adviser to the Border Bulldogs. He was also an assistant coach at the Cheetahs from 2003 to 2007 before he returned to the Bulldogs as their head coach in 2008 and 2009.

He joined the Eastern Province Kings as an assistant backline coach in 2010 and became the head coach of their Vodacom Cup side for the 2013 Vodacom Cup season.

Maidza was appointed head coach of the NMMU Madibaz on a three-year deal from 2014.
