= Wium Basson =

South African rugby union footballer (1975–2001)

- Born: Willem Wium Basson; 23 October 1975 Paarl, Western Cape, South Africa
- Died: 21 April 2001 (aged 25) Paarl, Western Cape, South Africa
- Height: 2.00 m (6 ft 7 in)
- Weight: 116 kg (256 lb)
- School: Paarl Boys' High School

Rugby union career
- Position: Lock
Provincial / State sides
Years	Team	Apps	(Points)
1997–2000	Blue Bulls	48	
Super Rugby
Years	Team	Apps	(Points)
1998–2000	Bulls	16	
International career
Years	Team	Apps	(Points)
1997	South Africa (tour)	2	

Willem Wium Basson (23 October 1975 – 21 April 2001) was a South African rugby union player.

== Playing career ==
Basson matriculated at Paarl Boys' High School and in 1993 represented the Western Province Schools team at the annual Craven Week tournament. He then moved to Northern Transvaal and in 1996 played for the Northern Transvaal under–21 team and was also selected for the South African under–21 team. Basson made his senior provincial debut for the Blue Bulls in 1997 and from 1998 also played for the Northern Bulls in the Super Rugby competition.

Basson toured with the Springboks to Europe in 1997. He did not play in any test matches for the Springboks but played in two tour matches.

Basson died on 21 April 2001, approximately a month after he was diagnosed with cancer.

== See also ==
- List of South Africa national rugby union players – Springbok no. 661
