= Fudge Mabeta =

South African rugby union player

- Full name: Mthunzi Karl Mabeta
- Born: 13 June 1987 (age 39) Boston, United States
- Height: 1.99 m (6 ft 6 1/2 in)
- Weight: 108 kg (17 st 0 lb; 238 lb)
- School: Pretoria Boys High School
- University: University of Pretoria

Rugby union career
- Position: Lock
- Current team: Retired
Amateur team(s)
Years	Team	Apps	(Points)
2015	College Rovers		
Senior career
Years	Team	Apps	(Points)
2006–2011	Blue Bulls	58	(15)
2010	Bulls	2	(0)
- Correct as of 22 February 2015

Mthunzi Karl "Fudge" Mabeta (born 13 June 1987) is a United States-born South African rugby union footballer, currently playing with KwaZulu-Natal Moor Cup side College Rovers.

He made more than 50 appearances for the Blue Bulls, as well as two Super Rugby appearances for the Bulls before a serious car accident severely affected his career.
