= Ian Noble =

Zimbabwean rugby footballer & coach

Personal information
- Full name: Ian Ernest Noble
- Born: 6 April 1972 (age 53) Bulawayo, Rhodesia
- Height: 183 cm (6 ft 0 in)
- Weight: 92 kg (14 st 7 lb)

Playing information

Rugby union
- Position: Centre
Club
Years	Team	Pld	T	G	FG	P
	Mpumalanga
	Stirling County
	Glasgow Hawks
	Total	0	0	0	0	0
Representative
Years	Team	Pld	T	G	FG	P
1993–96	Zimbabwe	7	3	20	0	66

Rugby league
- Position: Wing
Representative
Years	Team	Pld	T	G	FG	P
2000	South Africa	2	0	0	0	0

Coaching information
Club
Years	Team	Gms	W	D	L	W%
	Haddington
2010–	Irvine RFC
	Total	0	0	0	0
- Source: As of 9 November 2025

Ian Noble (born 6 April 1972) is a Zimbabwean former rugby union and rugby league footballer who played in the 1990s and 2000s, and has coached rugby union in the 2010s.

== Background ==
Ian Noble was born in Bulawayo, Rhodesia

Noble represented Zimbabwe at the 1991 Rugby Union World Cup and South Africa in the 2000 Rugby League World Cup. As of 2010, he is the head coach of Irvine RFC.

== Playing career ==
Noble originally played rugby union for Zimbabwe. Attending the 1991 Rugby World Cup and playing 7 matches between 1993 and 1996, scoring 66 points.

When he was in South Africa playing for Mpumalanga, Noble changed codes and played rugby league for South Africa in the 2000 Rugby League World Cup.

Noble then moved to Britain and played for several clubs, including the Glasgow Hawks.

He later became a coach. In 2010, he was appointed head coach of Irvine RFC.
