= Grant Esterhuizen =

South African rugby union player

- Born: 28 April 1976 (age 50) Alexander Bay, Cape Province
- Height: 1.80 m (5 ft 11 in)
- Weight: 94 kg (207 lb)
- School: Afrikaanse Hoër Seunskool, Pretoria

Rugby union career
- Position(s): Centre, Wing
Senior career
Years	Team	Apps	(Points)
2003–2004	Bourgoin-Jallieu	45	(20)
2006–2009	Clermont	33	(10)
Provincial / State sides
Years	Team	Apps	(Points)
1996–1999	Blue Bulls	46	(90)
2000–03, 05–06	Golden Lions	50	(90)
Super Rugby
Years	Team	Apps	(Points)
1998–1999	Bulls	11	(15)
2000–01, 06	Cats	35	(15)
2003	Stormers	5	(10)
International career
Years	Team	Apps	(Points)
2000	South Africa	7	
National sevens team
Years	Team		Comps
2003	South Africa 7s		1

Grant Esterhuizen (born 28 April 1976) was a South African former rugby union player.

== Playing career ==
Esterhuizen matriculated at Afrikaanse Hoër Seunskool and represented Northern Transvaal at the annual Craven Week tournaments in 1993 and 1994. He made his senior provincial debut for the Blue Bulls in 1996.

Esterhuizen made his test match debut for the Springboks as a substitute against New Zealand at Jade Stadium, Christchurch in 2000 and played in seven test matches during the 2000 rugby season. In 2003, he represented South Africa at sevens.

=== Test history ===
No.	Opponents	Results (SA 1st)	Position	Tries	Dates	Venue
1.	New Zealand	12–25	Replacement		22 Jul 2000	Jade Stadium, Christchurch
2.	New Zealand	46–40	Centre		19 Aug 2000	Ellis Park, Johannesburg
3.	Australia	18–19	Centre		26 Aug 2000	Kings Park, Durban
4.	Argentina	37–33	Centre		12 Nov 2000	River Plate Stadium, Buenos Aires
5.	Ireland	28–18	Centre		19 Nov 2000	Lansdowne Road, Dublin
6.	Wales	23–13	Replacement		26 Nov 2000	Millennium Stadium, Cardiff
7.	England	17–25	Replacement		2 Dec 2000	Twickenham, London

== See also ==
- List of South Africa national rugby union players – Springbok no. 692
