= Gavin Passens =

South African rugby union player (born 1976)

- Full name: Gavin Andrew Passens
- Born: 18 May 1976 (age 50) Cape Town, South Africa
- Height: 180 cm (5 ft 11 in)
- Weight: 85 kg (187 lb)
- School: Robinvale High School

Rugby union career
- Position: Wing
Super Rugby
Years	Team	Apps	(Points)
2001–02	Bulls		
2006–08	Cheetahs		
International career
Years	Team	Apps	(Points)
2000	South Africa		

Gavin Andrew Passens (born 18 May 1976) is a South African former professional rugby union player.

Passens, the son of fabric makers, comes from the small town of Mamre outside Cape Town and was educated at Robinvale High School in nearby Atlantis. He is a product of the Hamlets Rugby Club.

A speedy winger, Passens got his start in the Currie Cup with the Griffons in 1999, before moving onto the Pumas for the 2000 Currie Cup, where he had an immediate impact with a competition high 10 tries.

Passens gained selection to the Springboks for their 2000 end-of-year tours of Argentina and the British Isles. His international appearances were restricted to tour matches and included a two-try performance against an English National Divisions representative side in Worcester.

After a career setback in 2001 when he tore knee ligaments, Passens competed for several seasons in the Super 14, initially with the Bulls and then the Cheetahs.

== See also ==
- List of South Africa national rugby union players
