= Delarey du Preez =

South African rugby union player

- Full name: Gert Jacobus Delarey du Preez
- Born: 12 June 1975 (age 51) Queenstown, South Africa
- Height: 5 ft 9 in (175 cm)
- Weight: 242 lb (110 kg)
- School: Hangklip High School

Rugby union career
- Position: Hooker
Super Rugby
Years	Team	Apps	(Points)
- Cats
International career
Years	Team	Apps	(Points)
2002	South Africa	2	(5)

Gert Jacobus Delarey du Preez (born 12 June 1975), known as Delarey du Preez, is a South African former rugby union international who represented the Springboks in two Test matches.

Born and raised in Queenstown, de Preez was a SA Schools representative player and competed for the Border Bulldogs after school. He played for the Cats in the Super 12 and had a season in England with Gloucester in 2004.

In 2002 he featured in two Tests for the Springboks as a hooker, debuting against Samoa in Pretoria. He scored a try against the Samoans within two minutes of coming off the bench. His other Test appearance was a Tri-Nations match against Australia in Brisbane, where he was brought into the game for the final 10 minutes.

== See also ==
- List of South Africa national rugby union players
