= Keith Meyer =

American speed skater

Personal information
- Born: June 20, 1938 Geneva, Illinois, United States
- Died: July 27, 2010 (aged 72) Wilmington, North Carolina, United States

Sport
- Sport: Speed skating

Keith Edward Meyer (June 20, 1938 – July 27, 2010) was an American speed skater. He competed in the men's 1500 metres event at the 1960 Winter Olympics.
