= McNeil Hendricks =

South African rugby union player

- Born: McNeil Hendricks; 10 July 1973 (age 53) Malmesbury, Western Cape, South Africa
- Height: 1.80 m (5 ft 11 in)
- Weight: 101 kg (15 st 13 lb; 223 lb)
- School: Schoonspruit Senior Secondary School
- Occupation: Actor

Rugby union career
- Position: Wing
Provincial / State sides
Years	Team	Apps	(Points)
1994–1998	Boland	35	(77)
1999–2002	Blue Bulls	37	(110)
2003	Free State Cheetahs	16	(35)
2004	Western Province	3	
Super Rugby
Years	Team	Apps	(Points)
1998–2002	Bulls	10	(5)
International career
Years	Team	Apps	(Points)
1997	Emerging Springboks	1	
1997–1998	South Africa	2	(5)

McNeil Hendricks (born 10 July 1973), also known as "Maccie", is a former South African rugby union player who played primarily as a wing. He starred in the movie Invictus, in which he played the role of Chester Williams.

== Early life ==
Hendricks was born in Malmesbury. He attended St Thomas Primary School and finally matriculated at Schoonspruit Senior Secondary. In 1996 Hendricks was selected in the Boland President's Shield A team. He also played for Boland under 23 in the Bankfin U23 Cup.

== Career ==
=== 1996 ===
Hendricks made his Currie Cup debut for Boland in 1996. During the same year he was chosen in the Boland Invitation XV to face the touring All Blacks. At the end of 1996, he was part of the South Africa A squad that toured through the UK.

=== 1997 ===
Hendricks rose to prominence in the 1997 Currie Cup as a wing playing for Boland. This Boland team was coached by Nick Mallet and caused numerous upsets. His efforts did not go unnoticed, as he was selected at centre for the Emerging Springboks to play the touring British and Irish Lions. The game took place on his home ground, Boland Stadium in Wellington. The Lions ended up winning the game 51-22. His centre partner on the day was former Springbok Percy Montgomery with Kenya Sevens team and former Blitzbokke coach Paul Treu on the left wing.

Hendricks was also selected for the Springboks' successful end of year tour to Italy, France, England and Scotland. He did however not play in any games.

=== 1998 ===
In 1998 Hendricks moved to the Bulls rugby team after impressing with Boland for three seasons and played in the Super 12 for the Bulls from 1998. He remained at Boland for the 1998 Currie Cup season, before signing with the Blue Bulls at the end of the season. Hendricks however played during a dark time of Bulls rugby and therefore his talents were not fully exposed. He did however do enough to impress Springbok coach Nick Mallet, who has coached him at Boland, to be selected for the Springboks after also playing well for Boland against the touring Irish. On 20 June 1998 at Loftus Versfeld in Pretoria, Hendricks made his Springbok debut, taking the field as a substitute against Ireland. The Springboks won the game 33-0. The next week, on 27 June 1998, again at Loftus Versfeld, Hendricks earned his second and last Springbok cap, by again coming on as a replacement against Wales, replacing Stefan Terblanche in the 49th minute. A game the Springboks won 96-13. This remains the highest score the Springboks have scored against Wales. Hendricks scored his only test try during this game. The following weekend, 4 July 1998 Hendricks found himself again on the replacement bench at Newlands in Cape Town against England, but was not used during the game.

=== 1999 to 2002 ===
In 1999 Hendricks completely moved to Pretoria, playing Super Rugby for the Bulls and Currie Cup for the Blue Bulls. He was selected for the South Africa A team on their tour to Europe in 2001. He struggled to maintain his starting position in the Bulls team and found himself in the Bulls A team on occasion during 2002. During his time with the Bulls they only won one Currie Cup trophy, in 2002. Hendricks was not selected for the final against the Lions.

=== 2003 to 2004 ===
After the emergence of numerous other young wings and struggling to keep his spot in the team, Hendricks was forced to look elsewhere for regular first team rugby. He was snapped up by the Bloemfontein based Cheetahs in the 2003 season. After a disappointing season with the Cheetahs, Hendricks signed with the Kimberley based Griquas team. He played for one season which was hampered by injury.

In a bid to rejuvenate his ailing career, Hendricks signed with Western Province in 2004. He had a mediocre Vodacom Cup in which he was again hampered with injuries. He retired when his contract with Western Province expired.

=== Test history ===
No.	Opposition	Result (SA 1st)	Position	Tries	Date	Venue
1.	Ireland	33–0	Replacement		20 Jun 1998	Loftus Versfeld, Pretoria
2.	Wales	96–13	Replacement	1	27 Jun 1998	Loftus Versfeld, Pretoria

== After retirement ==
Hendricks is still active with developing rugby in his local community and in July 2012 completed the BokSmart Rugby Safety course and attended an IRB Level 2 Coaching workshop in Cape Town to promote safety in rugby in his local community.

=== Invictus ===
Director Clint Eastwood cast Hendricks as 1995 Rugby World Cup winning Springbok legend, Chester Williams for the movie Invictus, released in 2009. This is so far his only acting role.

== See also ==
- List of South Africa national rugby union players – Springbok no. 657
