= Trevor Halstead =

South African rugby union player

- Born: Trevor Michael Halstead; 17 June 1976 (age 50) Margate, KwaZulu-Natal,
- Height: 1.86 m (6 ft 1 in)
- Weight: 110 kg (240 lb)

Rugby union career
- Position: Centre
Senior career
Years	Team	Apps	(Points)
2005–2006	Munster	41	(40)
- Correct as of 28 May 2013
International career
Years	Team	Apps	(Points)
2001–2003	South Africa	6	(15)
- Correct as of 28 May 2013

Trevor Halstead (born 17 June 1976 in Margate, KwaZulu-Natal) is a former South African rugby union footballer. His position is centre. He is 1.85m tall, weighs 100 kg, and won 6 caps for the Springboks. He played for the Super 14 team the Sharks, but signed for Irish province Munster in 2005.

In 2006 he scored in Munster's Semi-final and Final victories in the Heineken European Cup. In total he played 41 games for Munster and scored 8 tries.

Trevor attended Kearsney College.
