= Ricardo Loubscher =

South African rugby union player

Ricardo Ian Peter Loubscher, born 11 June 1974 in Colesberg (South Africa), is former a South African rugby union player, who played for South Africa 4 times between 2002 and 2003, his last coming during the 2003 Rugby World Cup. He played for the Sharks in Super Rugby, typically as a Fullback. He has played provincial rugby in the Currie Cup for Natal Sharks and Mighty Elephants.

He played his first test match for the Springboks on the 8 June 2002 during a match against Wales.

Since 2012, he has been the backs coach for the National team, under head coach Heyneke Meyer.
