= Braam van Straaten =

South African rugby union footballer

- Born: Abraham Johannes Jacobus; 28 September 1971 (age 55) Pretoria, South Africa
- Height: 1.86 m (6 ft 1 in)
- Weight: 94 kg (14.8 st)
- School: Hoërskool Wonderboom
- University: Normaal Kollege Pretoria (NKP)

Rugby union career
- Position: Fly-half
Senior career
Years	Team	Apps	(Points)
2003	Leeds	22	(252)
2003–04	Sale Sharks	16	(165)
Provincial / State sides
Years	Team	Apps	(Points)
1994–96	Blue Bulls	21	(0)
1997	SWD Eagles	27	(256)
1998	Valke	17	(208)
1999–2001	Western Province	24	(311)
2004–05	Griquas	31	(291)
Super Rugby
Years	Team	Apps	(Points)
1998	Bulls	9	(62)
1999–2001	Stormers	32	(434)
International career
Years	Team	Apps	(Points)
1999–2001	South Africa	21	(221)
- Correct as of 24 June 2014

Abraham Johannes Jacobus van Straaten (born 28 September 1971) is a South African former professional rugby union footballer. He was capable of playing either at fly-half or centre, and played for the South Africa national team in 21 tests between 1999 and 2001, scoring 221 points.

Van Straaten was born in Pretoria and made a relatively late start to professional rugby, making his debut for the Bulls in 1996 at the age of 24.
