= Paul Treu =

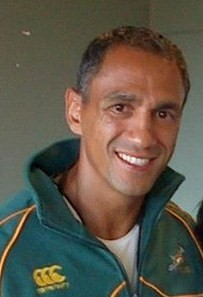
- Born: 23 July 1971 (age 55) Swellendam, South Africa
- Height: 1.76 m (5 ft 9 1/2 in)
- Weight: 81 kg (179 lb; 12 st 11 lb)
- University: University of the Western Cape, Stellenbosch University

Rugby union career
- Position: Coach
National sevens team
Years	Team	Comps
1999–2003	South Africa Sevens	32
Coaching career
- Years: Team
- 2004–2013: South Africa Sevens
- 2013–2014: Kenya Sevens
- 2014–2015: Western Province
- 2015–2019: Stormers
- 2018–2019: Western Province
- 2019–2022: Japan Sevens
- Correct as of 22 July 2025
Medal record
Men's rugby sevens
Representing South Africa
Commonwealth Games
Bronze medal – third place	2002 Manchester	Team competition

Paul Treu (born 23 July 1971) is a South African former rugby union player and coach. He played for the South African Sevens team from 1999 to 2003 and was named head coach of the side in 2004, where he remained until his resignation in 2013. He was also the head coach for the Kenya Sevens team from November 2013 to December 2014, when he was appointed by Western Province in a coaching role.
