= Kennedy Tsimba =

Zimbabwe international rugby union player

- Born: July 23, 1974 (age 52) Makoni Zimbabwe
- Height: 5 ft 11 in (1.80 m)
- Weight: 170 lb (77 kg)

Rugby union career
- Position: Flyhalf
Senior career
Years	Team	Apps	(Points)
1997-1998	Bath Rugby	5	(42)
Provincial / State sides
Years	Team	Apps	(Points)
1999 - 2005	Cheetahs	97	(1647)
2005 - 2007	Blue Bulls	25	(73)
International career
Years	Team	Apps	(Points)
1997-1998	Zimbabwe	6	(72)

Kennedy Chiedza Tsimba (Zimbabwean pronunciation: Shining Light; born 23 July 1974) is a 2012 World Rugby Hall of Fame inductee, South African professional Rugby coach.

Tsimba made his professional debut playing at the inaugural Rugby World Cup 7's in 1997 after which he signed his first professional contract with the 1998 European Champions Bath Rugby Club. It was at the South African-based franchise Free State Cheetahs that Tsimba became famous. Tsimba became a prolific point scorer and South Africa's fastest player to score 1000 points in all competitions (Currie Cup, Vodacom Cup and Super Rugby) He won Currie Cup, Vodacom Cup and Super Rugby titles, earning him the title "The King of Bloemfontein". Tsimba won Vodacom player of the year in 2000, Free State Sportsman of the Year 2001 and Currie Cup player of the Year 2003 in his 6-year spell at the Bloemfontein-based team.

In November 2005, after 6 years with Free State Cheetahs he transferred the Blue Bulls Rugby Union for an undisclosed fee. He was part of the club's historic SuperRugby success as part of a star studded squad. In 2008, he rejoined FreeState Cheetahs in a deal where he would appear for Griffons on loan where they won the Currie Cup 1st Division - Tsimba then claiming the 1st Division Currie Cup Player of the Year before retiring in 2010.

In 2011 he began his coaching journey as he switched from playing to assist coach by Freestate Cheetahs for a short stint as opted to join Rustenburg Impala Rugby club guiding them to 2 Community Gold Cup Championships.

St Alban's College in Pretoria would then secure the services of Tsimba as their Director of Rugby leading to glory years of the college by bringing the schools first victory in History over their main rivalries Pretoria Boys High in 2016. 2018 would have his team record most wins in a season.

In 2020 the University of Pretoria would secure his services leading to 2 Varsity Cup Victories in 2021 and 2022.

== Coaching career ==
After retiring Tsimba transitioned into coaching and was appointed as an assistant coach with the FreeState Cheetahs SuperRugby team in 2011 before assuming the role as Coach of Rustenburg Impala 1st team and Head of academy.

Impala went on to win the South African Community 2 out of 3 finals in a row while Tsimba was part of the club. His technical ability and recruitment strategies were a key component to the Clubs raise to the top of South African Clubs.

In 2016, Tsimba became the Director of Rugby and First Team Coach at St. Alban's College.

== Additional activities ==
After retiring Tsimba was invited to join the SABC 2007 and 2015 Rugby World Cup team as a Rugby Analyst. He commentated as part of the African broadcaster Kwese ESPN rugby team.

Tsimba currently commentates for Dstv broadcaster Supersport Schools covering the top premier rugby schools in South Africa .
