= Dan van Zyl =

South African sportsman

- Born: Daniel Jacobus van Zyl; 8 January 1971 (age 55) Pretoria, Transvaal, South Africa
- Height: 1.73 m (5 ft 8 in)
- Weight: 85 kg (187 lb)

Rugby union career
- Position: Scrum-half
Provincial / State sides
Years	Team	Apps	(Points)
- Western Province
Super Rugby
Years	Team	Apps	(Points)
- Stormers
International career
Years	Team	Apps	(Points)
2000	South Africa	1	(0)
- Correct as of 2000-12-02

Daniel Jacobus van Zyl (born 8 January 1971 in Pretoria) is a South African sportsman who represented his country at rugby union and played first-class cricket.

Dan van Zyl was educated at St. Alban's College and the University of Pretoria. He played his provincial rugby at Western Province and represented the Stormers as a scrum half in the Super 12. Also capable of playing fly half, van Zyl toured Europe and the United Kingdom with the South African national rugby union team in 2000 and made his only Test match appearance in a fixture against England at Twickenham as a reserve. He later played with and coached Irish club County Carlow and is now the coach of Wicklow RFC as well as a player for Old Wesley.

An all-rounder who bowled right-arm off-break, van Zyl played at Northern Transvaal from 1992/93 to 1996/97 and then Boland in 1998/99. He averaged exactly a wicket a match in both forms of the game, with 26 wickets from 26 first-class appearances and 48 wickets from 48 one dayers. He never scored a hundred with the bat but managed seven half centuries in first-class cricket to finish with a respectable 1293 runs at 27.51. Van Zyl had his best season in 1995/96 when he scored 332 runs at 33.20 and took eight wickets at 24.50.

== Accolades ==
In 2004 he was inducted into the University of Pretoria Sport Hall of fame.
