= Pierre Uys =

South African rugby union player

- Born: Pierre Johannes Uys; 5 February 1976 (age 50) Mossel Bay, Cape Province
- Height: 1.98 m (6 ft 6 in)
- Weight: 102 kg (225 lb)
- School: Groblersdal High School, Groblersdal
- University: University of the Free State

Rugby union career
- Position: Flank
Senior career
Years	Team	Apps	(Points)
2004–2005	Leeds Tykes	6	(0)
Provincial / State sides
Years	Team	Apps	(Points)
1998	Free State	3	(5)
1999–2000	Griquas	27	(70)
2001–2002	Pumas	18	(45)
2003–2004	Western Province	11	(30)
Super Rugby
Years	Team	Apps	(Points)
2001	Bulls	6	(0)
2002–2004	Stormers	16	(5)
International career
Years	Team	Apps	(Points)
2002	South Africa	1	(0)

Pierre Johannes Uys (born 5 February 1976) is a South African former rugby union player.

== Playing career ==
Uys began his representative career with Free State Under 21s and made his senior provincial debut for Free State in 1998. He then moved to Griquas and in 2001 he switched to the Pumas, and also played six matches for the Bulls in the Super 12. From 2002 until 2004 he represented the Stormers.

Uys played one test match for the Springboks, the test against Scotland during the 2002 end-of-year tour of Europe.

=== Test history ===
No.	Opponents	Results (SA 1st)	Position	Tries	Dates	Venue
1.	Scotland	6–21	Flank		16 Nov 2002	Murrayfield, Edinburgh

== See also ==
- List of South Africa national rugby union players – Springbok no. 738
