= Braam Els =

South African rugby union player

- Born: Wybrand Willem Els; 1 November 1971 (age 55) Kroonstad, South Africa
- Height: 2.03 m (6 ft 8 in)
- Weight: 120 kg (265 lb)
- School: Kroonstad High School

Rugby union career
- Position: Lock
Senior career
| Years | Team | Apps | (Points) |
| 1999–2000 | Perpignan | | |
Provincial / State sides
| Years | Team | Apps | (Points) |
| 1992–2000 | Free State | 155 | |
| 2001–2002 | Falcons | | |
Super Rugby
| Years | Team | Apps | (Points) |
| 1998 | Cats | 9 | (5) |
| 2001 | Bulls | | |
International career
| Years | Team | Apps | (Points) |
| 1997 | South Africa | 1 | |

Wybrand Willem "Braam" Els (born 11 November 1971) is a South African former rugby union player.

== Playing career ==
Els represented the Northern Free State for three consecutive years, from 1988 to 1990, at the Craven Week tournament for schoolboys. He made his provincial debut for Free State in 1992 and played 155 matches for the union.

Els played in one test match for the Springboks, as a replacement against Australia during the 1997 Tri Nations Series at Loftus Versfeld in Pretoria. He also played in two tour matches for the Springboks.

=== Test history ===
| No. | Opposition | Result (SA 1st) | Position | Tries | Date | Venue |
|---|---|---|---|---|---|---|
| 1. | Australia | 61–22 | Replacement | | 23 Aug 1997 | Loftus Versfeld, Pretoria |

== See also ==
- List of South Africa national rugby union players – Springbok no. 656
