= Casper Steyn =

South African rugby union player

- Born: 11 September 1973 (age 53) Vanderbijlpark, South Africa
- Height: 186 cm (6 ft 1 in)
- Weight: 94 kg (207 lb)

Rugby union career
- Position: Fullback / Fly-half / Wing
Senior career
Years	Team	Apps	(Points)
	Blue Bulls	59	(854)
2001–05	Viadana		
Super Rugby
Years	Team	Apps	(Points)
1997–01	Bulls		(204)

Casper Steyn (born 13 September 1973) is a South African former professional rugby union player.

== Biography ==
Born in Vanderbijlpark, Steyn was a versatile goal-kicking back and spent much of his career playing for the Blue Bulls, often remembered for his performance against the 1997 British Lions. He contributed 20 of his team's 35 points, kicking three conversions and three penalties, to go with one try, making Northern Transvaal (as they were them known) the first South African province to beat the Lions in the professional era. A prolific scorer for the Blue Bulls, Steyn amassed 854 points from 59 matches, including a team record 252 points in the 1999 Currie Cup.

Steyn played his rugby in Italy with Viadana from 2001 to 2005. He scored all 19 of the team's points in the final of the 2003-04 European Shield final against Montpellier, which they ended up losing 25-19. He later returned to serve as head coach. He competed briefly for the Pumas in the Currie Cup, before being forced into retirement in 2006 due to a serious neck injury.

In 2010, Steyn survived a near fatal car accident close to his home in Centurion, suffering cranial damage after being flung from his vehicle. He ended up in a coma, from which his family was advised there was only a 10 percent chance he would wake. Able to recover, Steyn had five metal plates inserted to his face as part of his reconstructive surgery.
