= Chester Williams =

South African rugby union player and coach (1970–2019)

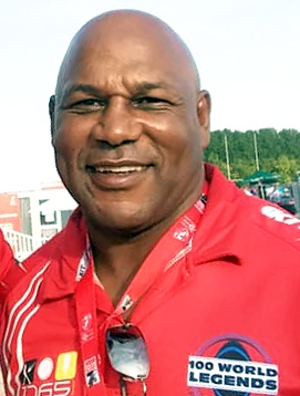
- Chester Williams in 2018
- Born: Chester Mornay Williams; 8 August 1970 Paarl, South Africa
- Died: 6 September 2019 (aged 49) Cape Town, South Africa
- Weight: 84 kg (13 st 3 lb)
- Notable relative: Avril Williams (uncle)

Rugby union career
- Position: Wing
Provincial / State sides
| Years | Team | Apps | (Points) |
| 1991–1998 | Western Province | 63 | (-) |
| 1999 | Golden Lions | | |
Super Rugby
| Years | Team | Apps | (Points) |
| 1999–2000 | Cats | 18 | (35) |
International career
| Years | Team | Apps | (Points) |
| 1993–2000 | South Africa | 27 | (70) |
National sevens team
| Years | Team | | Comps |
| 1993–2001 | South Africa | | 11 |
Coaching career
- Years: Team
- 2001–2003: South Africa 7's
- 2004–2005: Cats
- 2006: Uganda
- 2007-2006: Mpumalanga Pumas
- 2007–2012: Tunisia
- 2012–2013: RCM Timişoara
Medal record
Men's rugby union
Representing South Africa
Rugby World Cup
| Gold medal – first place | 1995 South Africa | Squad |

Chester Mornay Williams (8 August 1970 – 6 September 2019) was a South African rugby union player. He played as a winger for the South Africa national rugby union team (Springboks) from 1993 to 2000, most notably for the team that won the 1995 Rugby World Cup, which was hosted in South Africa. He was the only black player on the team. During the tournament he scored four tries for South Africa in its quarter-final match and also appeared in the semi-final and final. Domestically he played rugby for the Western Province in the Currie Cup.

After retiring, Williams pursued a career in coaching, including a spell with the South Africa national rugby sevens team, the Uganda national rugby union team, and the University of the Western Cape. He was portrayed by McNeil Hendricks in the 2009 Clint Eastwood film Invictus, a biographical sports drama film about the events in South Africa before and during the 1995 Rugby World Cup, and he also helped to coach Matt Damon and other actors for the rugby scenes used in the film. Williams died from a suspected heart attack on 6 September 2019 at the age of 49.

== Playing career ==
=== International ===
Williams is best known as the star winger of the South Africa national Springbok team that won the 1995 Rugby World Cup against New Zealand and was nicknamed "The Black Pearl". Williams was selected in the initial squad, but had to withdraw due to injury. He was later called back into the squad and played in the quarter-final, scoring four tries, followed by the semi-final and the final against New Zealand, which South Africa won 15–12.

Williams was 1.74 metres (5 feet 9 inches) tall with a playing weight of 84 kilograms (185 lb). He was the first non-white player to be included in the Springboks squad since Errol Tobias and his uncle Avril Williams in the early 1980s. The selection of non-white players was not common in South Africa before 1992 because of the country's policy of apartheid, and there were separate governing bodies for whites, blacks, and coloureds.

He made his debut for the Springboks at the age of 23 against Argentina on 13 November 1993 in Buenos Aires, a game that the Springboks went on to win 52–23 and in which he also scored a try. Williams was on the Springboks team that won the 1995 Rugby World Cup, notably scoring four tries against Western Samoa in the quarter-finals. His Boks career, hampered by knee injuries in 1996 and 1997, ended with a 23–13 win against Wales on 26 November 2000 in Cardiff. In total he played 27 games for the Springboks, scoring 14 tries and a total of 70 points. His honours included a Currie Cup win in 1999, with the Golden Lions, a Tri-Nations title in 1998 (albeit that he only made two short appearances as substitute) and the World Cup win in 1995.

=== Provincial ===
Domestically, Williams played rugby with the Western Province, appearing 63 times between 1991 and 1998, wearing jersey number 11. He then went on to win the Currie Cup with the Golden Lions in 1999.

=== Test history ===
World Cup final

| No. | Opposition | Result (SA 1st) | Position | Tries | Date | Venue |
|---|---|---|---|---|---|---|
| 1. | Argentina | 52–23 | Wing | 1 | 13 Nov 1993 | Ferro Carril Oeste Stadium, Buenos Aires |
| 2. | England | 15–32 | Wing | | 4 Jun 1994 | Loftus Versfeld, Pretoria |
| 3. | England | 27–9 | Wing | | 11 Jun 1994 | Newlands, Cape Town |
| 4. | New Zealand | 14–22 | Wing | | 9 Jul 1994 | Carisbrook, Dunedin |
| 5. | New Zealand | 9–13 | Wing | | 23 Jul 1994 | Athletic Park, Wellington |
| 6. | New Zealand | 18–18 | Wing | | 6 Aug 1994 | Eden Park, Auckland |
| 7. | Argentina | 42–22 | Wing | 1 | 8 Oct 1994 | Boet Erasmus Stadium, Port Elizabeth |
| 8. | Argentina | 46–26 | Wing | 1 | 15 Oct 1994 | Ellis Park, Johannesburg |
| 9. | Scotland | 34–10 | Wing | 1 | 19 Nov 1994 | Murrayfield, Edinburgh |
| 10. | Wales | 20–12 | Wing | 1 | 26 Nov 1994 | Cardiff Arms Park, Cardiff |
| 11. | Samoa | 60–8 | Wing | 2 | 13 Apr 1995 | Ellis Park, Johannesburg |
| 12. | Samoa | 42–14 | Wing | 4 | 10 Jun 1995 | Ellis Park, Johannesburg |
| 13. | France | 19–15 | Wing | | 17 Jun 1995 | Kings Park, Durban |
| 14. | New Zealand | 15–12 | Wing | | 24 Jun 1995 | Ellis Park, Johannesburg |
| 15. | Italy | 40–21 | Wing | | 12 Nov 1995 | Stadio Olimpico, Rome |
| 16. | England | 24–14 | Wing | 2 | 18 Nov 1995 | Twickenham, London |
| 17. | Australia | 14–13 | Substitute | | 18 July 1998 | Subiaco Oval, Perth |
| 18. | New Zealand | 13–3 | Substitute | | 25 July 1998 | Athletic Park, Wellington |
| 19. | Canada | 51–18 | Substitute | | 10 Jun 2000 | Basil Kenyon Stadium, East London |
| 20. | England | 18–13 | Substitute | | 17 Jun 2000 | Loftus Versfeld, Pretoria |
| 21. | England | 22–27 | Substitute | | 24 Jun 2000 | Free State Stadium, Bloemfontein |
| 22. | Australia | 23–44 | Substitute | | 8 Jul 2000 | Colonial Stadium, Melbourne |
| 23. | New Zealand | 46–40 | Wing | 1 | 19 Aug 2000 | Ellis Park, Johannesburg |
| 24. | Australia | 18–19 | Wing | | 16 Aug 2000 | Kings Park, Durban |
| 25. | Argentina | 37–33 | Wing | | 12 Nov 2000 | River Plate Stadium, Buenos Aires |
| 26. | Ireland | 28–18 | Wing | | 19 Nov 2000 | Lansdowne Road, Dublin |
| 27. | Wales | 23–13 | Substitute | | 16 Nov 2000 | Millennium Stadium, Cardiff |

== Personal life ==
Williams released his controversial authorised biography, eponymously titled Chester, in 2002. He claimed that he was shunned by some of his teammates in the 1995 Springbok squad and was called racist names by James Small, though he later clarified, "When we were together as a team, the team-spirit was good. We partied together, we had fun together, we stuck by one another. Those other things happened while we were playing against one another in the Currie Cup or domestic competitions. But that's in the past now. We have all moved on and everybody's happy."

Invictus, a 2009 film about the 1995 Rugby World Cup, and how it helped South Africa heal after years of apartheid features many scenes involving Williams, portrayed by McNeil Hendricks, including his face on the side of a South African Airways aeroplane. It also showed several scenes with black children in South Africa idolising him. Author John Carlin, who wrote the book the film was based on, has questioned the accuracy of this, as Williams identified as coloured rather than black. Carlin also wrote that during the team's visit to a township, Mark Andrews had attracted more attention than Williams because he was able to speak Xhosa. Williams himself worked as one of the film's rugby coaches, alongside Dubai-based coach Rudolf de Wee, a childhood friend whom he recruited to the film. Williams and de Wee worked with the actors, including Matt Damon, in recreating the games depicted in the film.

He was selected to carry the Olympic torch on behalf of South Africa on two occasions, the 2004 Summer Olympics in Athens, and the 2016 Summer Olympics in Rio de Janeiro. He completed the Absa Cape Epic mountain bike stage race, joining several former Springbok Rugby players who have also taken on the rugged challenge of the Untamed African MTB Race.

== Death ==
Williams died at the age of 49 on 6 September 2019 from a suspected heart attack. He was the fourth player from the 1995 world-cup-winning side to die, after Ruben Kruger, Joost van der Westhuizen, and James Small, the last having died two months before Williams.

== Coaching career ==
In 2001 Williams was selected as the coach of the South African sevens team that won bronze at the 2002 Commonwealth Games and ended runners up in the World Sevens Series. He remained sevens coach until 2003.

Despite having almost no experience at coaching the fifteen-man code at any senior level, Williams was mentioned as one of the possible successors to Springbok coach Rudolf Straeuli after he resigned in 2003, but the job was given to Jake White in 2004. He became coach of the Cats Super 12 team instead. He remained coach until July 2005 when he was fired after a series of poor results, when the Cats finished next-to-last in the 2005 super 12, achieving only one victory. However, in 2006, he was brought back into the South African coaching ranks as the head coach of the national "A" side (a developmental side for the Boks). Also in 2006, he spent a successful few months as coach of the Uganda national rugby union team, the Cranes.

He was named as the new coach of the Pumas, the team representing Mpumalanga in the Currie Cup, on 7 September 2006. He signed a two-year deal with the team, effective 1 October 2006, but resigned as coach in mid-2007. When White stepped down as the national coach in 2008, Williams was again in the running to replace him, but the job instead went to Peter de Villiers.

Williams lastly was head coach of University of the Western Cape in Varsity Rugby. Under his leadership UWC won the 2017 Varsity Shield competition.

== See also ==
- List of South Africa national rugby union players – Springbok no. 589
- List of South Africa national rugby sevens players
