= Boeta Wessels =

South African rugby union player

- Born: Johannes Coenrad Wessels; 30 June 1973 (age 53) Sishen, Northern Cape
- Height: 1.86 m (6 ft 1 in)
- Weight: 87 kg (192 lb)
- School: Kathu High School

Rugby union career
- Position(s): Flyhalf, Fullback
Provincial / State sides
Years	Team	Apps	(Points)
1993–2000	Griquas	111	(679)
2001	Blue Bulls	19	(57)
2003–2004	Leopards	23	(54)
Super Rugby
Years	Team	Apps	(Points)
1998	Sharks	8	(7)
1999	Cats	5	(2)
2001–2002	Bulls	12	(46)
International career
Years	Team	Apps	(Points)
1997	South Africa (tour)	1	

Johannes Coenrad "Boeta" Wessels (born 30 June 1973) is a South African former rugby union player.

== Playing career ==
Wessels matriculated at Kathu High School in the Northern Cape and was selected for the Griquas Craven Week team in 1991. He made his senior provincial debut for the Griquas in 1993 and played in 111 first-class matches for the union. Wessels also played Super Rugby for the Sharks, the Cats and the Bulls.

Wessels toured with the Springboks to Europe in 1997. He did not play in any test matches for the Springboks and played in one tour match.

== See also ==
- List of South Africa national rugby union players – Springbok no. 664
