= Wylie Human =

South African rugby union player

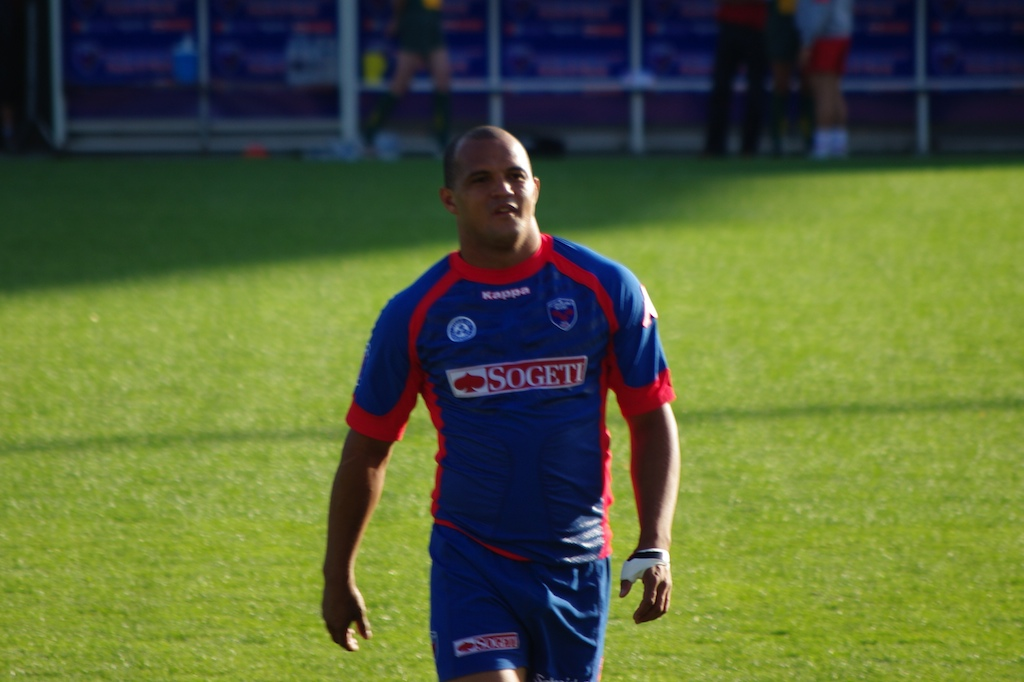
- Born: Wylie Human; 26 February 1979 (age 47) South Africa
- Height: 5 ft 12 in (1.83 m)
- Weight: 206 lb (93 kg; 14 st 10 lb)
- School: Uitenhage High School, Brandwag
- Occupation: Sport's Administrator (Uitenhage High School)

Rugby union career
- Position: Wing
- Current team: Stormers
Senior career
Years	Team	Apps	(Points)
2001–2003	Sharks		
2004	Cats		
2005–2006	Northampton Saints		
2007	Bath		
2008	Stormers		

Wylie Human (born 26 February 1979) is a South African rugby union winger. He has played for several Super Rugby teams including the Stormers, the Sharks and the Lions. He has also played for Bath and Northampton Saints, and is currently plying his trade with French second division side Pays d'Aix Rugby Club Le PARC.
