= Thando Manana =

South African rugby union player

- Born: Thando Desmond Manana; 16 October 1977 (age 49) Port Elizabeth, Eastern Cape
- Height: 1.90 m (6 ft 3 in)
- Weight: 98 kg (216 lb)
- School: Chapman High School, Port Elizabeth

Rugby union career
Provincial / State sides
Years	Team	Apps	(Points)
2000–01	Griquas	27	(30)
2002	Griffons	2	(0)
Super Rugby
Years	Team	Apps	(Points)
2001	Bulls	6	(0)
International career
Years	Team	Apps	(Points)
2000	South Africa		

Thando Manana (born 16 October 1977) is a South African former rugby union player.

== Playing career ==
As a schoolboy Manana represented the Eastern Province academy team at the 1996 Craven Week tournament. He made his provincial debut for Griquas in 2000 and also played for the South African under–23 team. At the end of the 2000 season he toured with the Springboks to Argentina, Britain and Ireland. Manana did not play in any test matches but played in three tour matches for the Springboks.

== See also ==
- List of South Africa national rugby union players – Springbok no. 708
