= Frikkie Welsh =

South African rugby union player

- Born: Barend Frederik Welsh; 26 October 1978 (age 48) Middelburg, South Africa
- Height: 1.82 m (5 ft 11 1/2 in)
- Weight: 91 kg (14 st 5 lb; 201 lb)
- School: Kanonkop High School, Middelburg

Rugby union career
- Position: Centre
Senior career
Years	Team	Apps	(Points)
2005–06	Bath	17	(25)
Provincial / State sides
Years	Team	Apps	(Points)
1998–99	Natal Wildebeest	8	(10)
2000–01	Pumas	14	(40)
2001–04, 06–07	Blue Bulls	65	(125)
2009–10	Western Province	26	(30)
Super Rugby
Years	Team	Apps	(Points)
1998–04, 06–07	Bulls	50	(85)
2010	Stormers	1	(0)

Frikkie Welsh (born 26 October 1978) is a South African former rugby union player. He represented the Bulls and the Stormers in the Super Rugby competition.
