= 2005 Currie Cup =

Domestic rugby union competition

- Countries: South Africa
- Date: 24 June – 22 October 2005
- Champions: Free State Cheetahs (2nd title)
- Runners-up: Blue Bulls

The 2005 Currie Cup (known as the ABSA Currie Cup for sponsorship reasons) was the 67th season in the South African Currie Cup competition since it started in 1889.

In a rematch of the 2004 final, the Free State Cheetahs reversed the result, coming from behind to defeat the Blue Bulls 29–25 and win their first Currie Cup since 1976.

== Qualification round ==
=== Competition ===
The fourteen provincial teams were divided in two equal strength sections (Section X and Section Y) according to the standings of the teams at the end of the 2004 competition.

All the teams played a single round of games within their section, meaning every team played six matches – three at home and three away.

Teams received four points for a win and two points for a draw. Bonus points were awarded to teams that scored 4 or more tries in a game, as well as to teams that lost a match by 7 points or less. Teams were ranked by points, then points difference (points scored less points conceded).

The top four teams in each section qualified to the Premier Division, while the bottom three teams in each section qualified to the First Division. No points from the qualifying round were carried over to the Premier Division or First Division.

=== Teams ===
Location of teams in 2005 Currie Cup
Section X
Section Y

2005 Currie Cup qualifying round Section X teams
Team	Sponsored Name	Stadium/s	Sponsored Name
Blue Bulls	Vodacom Blue Bulls	Loftus Versfeld, Pretoria	Securicor Loftus
Boland Cavaliers	Boland Cavaliers	Boland Stadium, Wellington	Boland Stadium
Falcons	AMD Falcons	Bosman Stadium, Brakpan	Bosman Stadium
Golden Lions	Golden Lions	Ellis Park Stadium, Johannesburg	Ellis Park Stadium
Mighty Elephants	Mighty Elephants	EPRU Stadium, Port Elizabeth	EPRU Stadium
Sharks	Sharks	Kings Park Stadium, Durban	ABSA Stadium
SWD Eagles	SWD Eagles	Outeniqua Park, George	Outeniqua Park
2005 Currie Cup qualifying round Section Y teams
Team	Sponsored Name	Stadium/s	Sponsored Name
Border Bulldogs	Border Bulldogs	Buffalo City Stadium, East London	ABSA Stadium
Free State Cheetahs	Vodacom Cheetahs	Free State Stadium, Bloemfontein	Vodacom Park
Griffons	Griffons	North West Stadium, Welkom	North West Stadium
Griquas	Wildeklawer Griquas	Griqua Park, Kimberley	ABSA Park
Leopards	Leopards	Olën Park, Potchefstroom	Olën Park
Pumas	@lantic Pumas	Puma Stadium, Witbank	@lantic Park
Western Province	Investec Western Province	Newlands Stadium, Cape Town	Newlands Stadium

=== Logs ===
2005 Currie Cup qualifying round Section X Log
Pos	Team	Pl	W	D	L	PF	PA	PD	TF	TA	TB	LB	Pts
1	Sharks	6	6	0	0	247	102	+145	38	12	4	0	28
2	Golden Lions	6	5	0	1	223	98	+125	26	11	4	1	25
3	Blue Bulls	6	4	0	2	261	141	+120	38	18	4	1	21
4	Boland Cavaliers	6	3	0	3	201	174	+27	26	23	3	1	16
5	Mighty Elephants	6	2	0	4	146	243	–97	16	32	2	0	10
6	SWD Eagles	6	1	0	5	75	273	–198	7	34	0	0	4
7	Falcons	6	0	0	6	116	235	–119	12	33	2	1	3
2005 Currie Cup qualifying round Section Y Log
1	Free State Cheetahs	6	6	0	0	209	54	+155	23	6	3	0	27
2	Western Province	6	5	0	1	235	117	+118	32	12	5	1	26
3	Griquas	6	3	0	3	188	140	+48	22	14	3	2	17
4	Leopards	6	3	0	3	182	246	–64	20	35	3	0	15
5	Pumas	6	2	0	4	133	203	–70	18	22	3	0	11
6	Border Bulldogs	6	1	0	5	119	210	–91	16	24	2	1	7
7	Griffons	6	1	0	6	119	215	–96	11	29	1	0	5
* Legend: Pos = Position, Pl = Played, W = Won, D = Drawn, L = Lost, PF = Points for, PA = Points against, PD = Points difference, TF = Tries For, TA = Tries Against, TB = Try bonus points, LB = Losing bonus points, Pts = Log points The top 4 teams in each section qualified to the Premier Division. The bottom 3 teams in each section qualified to the First Division. Points breakdown: *4 points for a win *2 points for a draw *1 bonus point for a loss by seven points or less *1 bonus point for scoring four or more tries in a match

=== Results ===
The following matches were played:

==== Section X ====
===== Round one =====
24 June 2005	Blue Bulls	69–28	Mighty Elephants	Loftus Versfeld, Pretoria
16:30	Try: John Mametsa 3', 57', 68'; Riaan van der Bergh 11', 13'; Johan Wasserman 21', 64'; Adriaan Fondse 28'; Heini Adams 35'; JP Nel 46'; Warren Brosnihan 75'; Con: Derick Hougaard 22', 29', 47', 58', 65', 69' (6/10); Kennedy Tsimba 76' (1/1)	Scoreboard	Try: Vuyani Dlomo 30', 32', 51'; Wayne van Heerden 78'; Con: Justin Peach 31', 33', 52', 79' (4/4); Cards: James Leuner (yellow card) 7'; Wayne van Heerden (yellow card) 59'; Michael Vermaak (yellow card) 60'	Attendance: 3,470; Referee: Jerome America

24 June 2005	Golden Lions	44–6	Falcons	Ellis Park Stadium, Johannesburg
19:00	Try: Gerhard Vosloo 28'; Trevor Hall 51'; Willem Stoltz 58'; Wylie Human 60'; Schalk Brits 64'; Tiaan Snyman 73'; Con: André Pretorius 29', 52', 59', 74' (4/6); Pen: André Pretorius 6', 56' (2/2); Cards: Schalk Brits (yellow card) 10'	Scoreboard	Pen: Louis Strydom 2', 11' (2/2); Cards: Jacques Lombaard (yellow card) 16'	Attendance: 5,085; Referee: Deon van Blommestein

24 June 2005	Sharks	37–23	Boland Cavaliers	Kings Park Stadium, Durban
19:00	Try: JP Pietersen 1'; Henno Mentz 6'; Grant Rees 31'; Adrian Jacobs 42'; Deon Carstens 51'; Braam Immelman 77'; Con: Herkie Kruger 7', 32' (2/5); Pen: Herkie Kruger 14' (1/1)	Scoreboard	Try: Antonius Verhoeven 35'; Henk Eksteen 69'; Con: Patrick Petersen 36' (1/1); Jacques Schutte 70' (1/1); Pen: Patrick Petersen 20', 25', 65' (3/3); Cards: Antonius Verhoeven (yellow card) 57'	Referee: Jonathan Kaplan

Bye/s: SWD Eagles

===== Round two =====
2 July 2005	SWD Eagles	3–36	Sharks	Outeniqua Park, George
15:00	Pen: Danie de Beer 22' (1/1); Cards: Sias Wagner (yellow card) 10'	Scoreboard	Try: JP Pietersen 8'; Henno Mentz 13'; Grant Rees 17'; Jacques Botes 57'; Brett Hennessey 63'; Con: Herkie Kruger 9', 14', 18' (3/3); Adrian Jacobs (0/1); Brett Hennessey 64' (1/1); Pen: Herkie Kruger 28' (1/1); Cards: Jaco Gouws (yellow card) 43'	Attendance: 3,500; Referee: Jerome Fortuin

2 July 2005	Falcons	14–37	Blue Bulls	Bosman Stadium, Brakpan
17:00	Try: Riaan Viljoen 2'; Con: Louis Strydom (0/1); Pen: Louis Strydom 25', 44' (2/3); Drop: Louis Strydom 6' (1/2); Cards: Nico Luus (yellow card) 59'	Scoreboard	Try: Anton Leonard 15', 67'; Ettienne Botha 29'; Johan Roets 62'; John Mametsa 82'; Con: Derick Hougaard (0/4); Kennedy Tsimba (0/1); Pen: Derick Hougaard 9', 13', 50', 71' (4/5); Drop: Derick Hougaard (0/1)	Attendance: 4,500

2 July 2005	Boland Cavaliers	27–32	Golden Lions	Boland Stadium, Wellington
15:30	Try: Jongi Nokwe 25'; Jacques Badenhorst 68'; Antonius Verhoeven 90'; Con: Jacques Schutte 26', 69' (2/2); Patrick Petersen 91' (1/1); Pen: Jacques Schutte 12', 18' (2/2)	Scoreboard	Try: Conrad Jantjes 6'; Wylie Human 33', 53'; Willem Stoltz 60'; Con: Tiaan Snyman 7', 54', 61' (3/4); Pen: Tiaan Snyman 32' (1/1); Quintin Jean van Tonder 78' (1/1)

Bye/s: Mighty Elephants

===== Round three =====
8 July 2005	Golden Lions	56–10	SWD Eagles	Ellis Park Stadium, Johannesburg
19:00	Try: Jorrie Muller 14'; Grant Esterhuizen 19'; Conrad Jantjes 40'; Wikus van Heerden 45', 60'; Willem Stoltz 49'; Nel Fourie 58'; Con: Tiaan Snyman 15', 20', 41', 46', 50' (5/5); Nel Fourie 61' (1/2); Pen: Tiaan Snyman 8', 12', 25' (3/3); Cards: Willem Stoltz (yellow card) 74'	Scoreboard	Try: Darryl Coeries 79'; Con: Danie de Beer 80' (1/1); Pen: Danie de Beer 27' (1/1); Cards: Danie Thiart (yellow card) 65'	Attendance: 4,827; Referee: Tappe Henning

9 July 2005	Blue Bulls	41–29	Boland Cavaliers	Loftus Versfeld, Pretoria
15:00	Try: Anton Leonard 5', 61'; Johan Wasserman 32'; Kennedy Tsimba 36'; Wynand Olivier 46'; JP Nel 68'; Con: Kennedy Tsimba 32', 37' (2/4); Derick Hougaard 62', 69' (2/2); Pen: Kennedy Tsimba 12' (1/2)	Scoreboard	Try: David de Villiers 55'; Jongi Nokwe 66', 76'; Kobus le Roux 79'; Con: Jacques Schutte 56', 67', 80' (3/4); Pen: Jacques Schutte 20' (1/1)

9 July 2005	Mighty Elephants	32–31	Falcons	EPRU Stadium, Port Elizabeth
15:30	Try: Wayne van Heerden 34'; JJ Pienaar 62'; Vuyani Dlomo 69'; Justin Peach 74'; Con: Justin Peach 35', 63', 70' (3/4); Pen: Justin Peach 4', 53' (2/2)	Scoreboard	Try: Piet Krause 23'; Dirk Leon Lubbe 26'; Frikkie Swart 31'; Eugene Kinghorn 59'; Con: Louis Strydom 24', 27', 32', 60' (4/4); Pen: Louis Strydom 10' (1/1)

Bye/s: Sharks

===== Round four =====
16 July 2005	SWD Eagles	6–83	Blue Bulls	Outeniqua Park, George
15:00	Pen: Danie de Beer 7', 33' (2/2)	Scoreboard	Try: JP Nel 16', 79'; Riaan van der Bergh 19', 76'; Kennedy Tsimba 22', 49'; John Mametsa 28'; Heini Adams 35'; Wynand Olivier 56'; Anton Leonard 62'; Derick Hougaard 71'; Con: Kennedy Tsimba 17', 20', 23', 36', 50' (5/6); Derick Hougaard 57', 77', 80' (3/5); Pen: Kennedy Tsimba 3', 13', 46' (3/3); Drop: Derick Hougaard 69' (1/1)	Attendance: 4,000; Referee: Craig Joubert

16 July 2005	Boland Cavaliers	30–16	Mighty Elephants	Boland Stadium, Wellington
15:30	Try: Jaco Engels 1'; John Burke 51', 76'; Con: Jacques Schutte 2', 52', 77' (3/3); Pen: Jacques Schutte 44', 88' (2/2); Drop: Jacques Schutte 19' (1/1); Cards: Charl Blom (yellow card) 65'	Scoreboard	Try: JJ Pienaar 58'; Con: Justin Peach 59' (1/1); Pen: Justin Peach 5', 12', 26' (3/3)

16 July 2005	Sharks	22–16	Golden Lions	Kings Park Stadium, Durban
17:00	Try: Henno Mentz 14'; Rudi Keil 40'; Bennie Nortje 60'; Con: Herkie Kruger 41', 61' (2/3); Pen: Herkie Kruger 72' (1/2)	Scoreboard	Try: Wikus van Heerden 80'; Con: Nel Fourie 81' (1/1); Pen: Tiaan Snyman 17', 54' (2/2); Nel Fourie 67' (1/1); Cards: Wylie Human (yellow card) 12'	Referee: Deon van Blommestein

Bye/s: Falcons

===== Round five =====
22 July 2005	Boland Cavaliers	56–20	SWD Eagles	Boland Stadium, Wellington
16:00	Try: Enrico Swartz 1'; Angelo Brinkhuys 19'; Piet van Zyl 22', 37', 88'; Neil Papier 24'; Jongi Nokwe 72'; John Burke 80'; Con: Jacques Schutte 20', 23', 38', 89' (4/7); Antonius Verhoeven 25' (1/1); Pen: Jacques Schutte 13', 32' (2/2)	Scoreboard	Try: Jeremy John Plaatjies 27'; Darryl Coeries 48'; Bevin Fortuin 67'; Con: Danie de Beer 49' (1/2); Pen: Danie de Beer 30' (1/1); Cards: Bossie Clarke (yellow card) 20'	Referee: Jonathan Kaplan

22 July 2005	Mighty Elephants	19–29	Golden Lions	EPRU Stadium, Port Elizabeth
19:00	Try: Vuyani Dlomo 4'; Con: Justin Peach 5' (1/1); Pen: Justin Peach 8', 38', 69', 79' (4/4)	Scoreboard	Try: Jorrie Muller 58'; Wylie Human 73'; Con: Nel Fourie 59', 74' (2/2); Pen: Quintin Jean van Tonder 6' (1/1); Nel Fourie 50', 65', 70' (3/3); Drop: Nel Fourie 80' (1/1)	Referee: Johann Meuwesen

22 July 2005	Falcons	31–67	Sharks	Bosman Stadium, Brakpan
19:10	Try: Trevor Crouse 24'; Andre Beer 62', 68'; Marius Goosen 81'; Con: Louis Strydom (0/3); Willem Slabbert 82' (1/1); Pen: Louis Strydom 4', 20', 40' (3/4)	Scoreboard	Try: Skipper Badenhorst 6'; Brent Russell 33', 42', 73'; Henno Mentz 45', 47'; Jaco Gouws 51'; Herkie Kruger 56'; Nico Breedt 65'; Rudi Keil 76'; Warren Britz 78'; Con: Herkie Kruger (0/4); Brent Russell 48', 52', 66', 74', 77', 79' (6/7)	Attendance: 4,500; Referee: Linston Manuels

Bye/s: Blue Bulls

===== Round six =====
29 July 2005	SWD Eagles	19–6	Falcons	Outeniqua Park, George
15:15	Try: Jeremy Plaatjies 27'; Con: Daniel Philander 28' (1/1); Pen: Daniel Philander 21', 23', 41', 67' (4/4); Bevin Fortuin (0/1)	Scoreboard	Pen: Louis Strydom 10', 14' (2/5)	Attendance: 500; Referee: Christie du Preez

29 July 2005	Sharks	67–15	Mighty Elephants	Kings Park Stadium, Durban
19:00	Try: Henno Mentz 2', 21', 44'; Jacques Botes 13'; Warren Britz 18'; Rudi Keil 33'; Adrian Jacobs 42'; Dave von Hoesslin 61'; Bennie Nortje 71'; Waylon Murray 75'; Con: Herkie Kruger 3', 14', 19', 22', 34', 43', 62' (7/10); Pen: Herkie Kruger 5' (1/1)	Scoreboard	Try: Baldwin McBean 30'; Clinton van Rensburg 35'; Justin Peach 67'; Con: Justin Peach (0/2); Clinton van Rensburg (0/1); Cards: JJ Pienaar (yellow card) 60'	Referee: Eugene Daniels

Postponed	13 August 2005	Golden Lions	46–17	Blue Bulls	Ellis Park Stadium, Johannesburg
	15:00	Try: Marius Schoeman 11'; Schalk van der Merwe 26'; Schalk Brits 32'; Willem Stoltz 45'; Wylie Human 67' penalty try 69'; Con: Nel Fourie 12', 27', 33', 46' (4/4); Tiaan Snyman 70' (1/2); Pen: Nel Fourie 5', 53' (2/3)	Scoreboard	Try: John Mametsa 58'; Morné Steyn 73'; Keegan Fredericks 78'; Con: Morné Steyn 79' (1/3); Pen: Morné Steyn (0/1)	Attendance: 25,033; Referee: Jonathan Kaplan

Bye/s: Boland Cavaliers

===== Round seven =====
5 August 2005	Mighty Elephants	36–17	SWD Eagles	EPRU Stadium, Port Elizabeth
17:00	Try: Sebastian Hilpert 52'; Fabian Juries 54'; Justin Peach 81'; Con: Justin Peach 53', 55', 82' (3/3); Pen: Justin Peach 3', 13', 19', 48', 61' (5/5)	Scoreboard	Try: Johannes Izak Adolf Saayman 30'; Tewis de Bruyn 73'; Con: Daniel Philander 31' (1/1); Danie de Beer 74' (1/1); Pen: Daniel Philander 9' (1/1); Cards: Danie Thiart (yellow card) 17'; Randile Julies (yellow card) 48'; Ashley Buys (yellow card) 77'	Attendance: 500; Referee: Marius Jonker

5 August 2005	Falcons	28–36	Boland Cavaliers	Bosman Stadium, Brakpan
19:00	Try: Jacques Nieuwenhuis 25'; Frikkie Swart 37'; Andre Beer 80'; Con: Louis Strydom 26', 38' (2/2); Riaan Viljoen (0/1); Pen: Louis Strydom 6', 47', 56' (3/4); Drop: Riaan Viljoen (0/1)	Scoreboard	Try: Rayno Benjamin 14', 52'; Nicolas Francois Prinsloo 21'; Jacques Badenhorst 43', 60'; Charl Blom 50'; Con: Antonius Verhoeven (0/3); Rennie Dazel 51', 53', 60' (3/3); Pen: Antonius Verhoeven (0/1)	Attendance: 375; Referee: Tappe Henning

5 August 2005	Blue Bulls	14–18	Sharks	Loftus Versfeld, Pretoria
19:10	Try: Ettienne Botha 8'; Heini Adams 36'; Con: Morné Steyn 9', 37' (2/2); Pen: Morné Steyn (0/1); Cards: Adriaan Strauss (red card) 79'	Scoreboard	Try: Henno Mentz 54'; Brent Russell 62'; Waylon Murray 67'; Con: Ruan Pienaar (0/2); Brent Russell (0/1); Pen: Herkie Kruger 15' (1/2)	Attendance: 33,000; Referee: Shaun Veldsman

Bye/s: Golden Lions

==== Section Y ====
===== Round one =====
24 June 2005	Griquas	54–12	Griffons	Griqua Park, Kimberley
19:00	Try: Tiaan Liebenberg 22'; Heinrich Stride 24'; Alshaun Bock 41', 77'; Gareth Krause 57'; Duimpie Theron 63'; Brendell Brandt 80'; Con: Braam van Straaten 23', 42', 58', 64' (4/5); Frederick Barend Prinsloo 78' (1/2); Pen: Braam van Straaten 3', 8', 17' (3/3); Cards: Johan Ackermann (yellow card) 30'	Scoreboard	Pen: Andries Hough 5', 14', 35' (3/3); Drop: Andries Hough 18' (1/1); Cards: Isak Job (yellow card) 45'	Attendance: 1,500; Referee: Jerome Fortuin

24 June 2005	Free State Cheetahs	25–22	Western Province	Free State Stadium, Bloemfontein
19:10	Try: Friedrich Lombard 8'; Con: Willem de Waal 9' (1/1); Pen: Willem de Waal 5', 29', 33', 51', 64', 71' (6/6); Drop: Willem de Waal (0/1); Cards: Ryno van der Merwe (yellow card) 65'	Scoreboard	Try: Luke Watson 30'; David Hendricks 61'; Egon Seconds 72'; Con: Chris Rossouw 31', 73' (2/3); Pen: Chris Rossouw (0/2); Peter Grant 66' (1/1)	Attendance: 5,000; Referee: Tappe Henning

24 June 2005	Pumas	43–56	Leopards	Puma Stadium, Witbank
19:00	Try: Sam Gerber 29'; Giscard Pieters 37', 90'; Rudi Britz 41'; Jan Hendrik Cloete 73'; Jeandre Fourie 85'; Con: Casper Steyn 30', 42', 86', 91' (4/5); Jeandre Fourie 74' (1/1); Pen: Casper Steyn 17' (1/1)	Scoreboard	Try: Jonathan Mokuena 7'; Bertus Swanepoel 13'; Naas Olivier 24', 64'; Anvor Schooney 32', 69'; Ronnie Uys 61'; Con: Naas Olivier 14', 25', 33', 62', 65', 70' (6/7); Pen: Naas Olivier 21', 80', 89' (3/3); Cards: Ronnie Uys (yellow card) 71'	Attendance: 1,500; Referee: Shaun Veldsman

Bye/s: Border Bulldogs

===== Round two =====
1 July 2005	Western Province	47–22	Griffons	Newlands Stadium, Cape Town
19:10	Try: Tonderai Chavhanga 18'; Egon Seconds 23'; Chris Rossouw 39'; Peter Grant 47'; Joe Pietersen 56'; Gus Theron 67'; Adri Badenhorst 77'; Con: Chris Rossouw 24', 48' (2/4); Joe Pietersen 68' (1/3); Pen: Chris Rossouw 28' (1/1); Joe Pietersen 55' (1/1); Drop: Joe Pietersen (0/1)	Scoreboard	Try: Ockie van Zyl 30'; David Johnson 62'; Christo van Niekerk 72'; Con: Andries Hough 63', 73' (2/3); Pen: Andries Hough 14' (1/1)	Referee: Linston Manuels

2 July 2005	Free State Cheetahs	54–0	Leopards	Free State Stadium, Bloemfontein
15:00	Try: Bian Vermaak 2'; Trompie Nontshinga 6', 43'; Corniel van Zyl 36'; Barend Pieterse 50'; Eddie Fredericks 58'; Jaco van Schalkwyk 72'; MJ Smith 80'; Con: Willem de Waal 51', 59' (2/6); MJ Smith 73', 81' (2/2); Pen: Willem de Waal 19', 40' (2/2)	Scoreboard		Attendance: 5,500

2 July 2005	Griquas	51–32	Border Bulldogs	Griqua Park, Kimberley
15:00	Try: Braam van Straaten 14'; Hedley Wessels 20'; Duimpie Theron 25'; Alshaun Bock 32'; Jané Du Toit 50', 58'; Cornelis Rautenbach 76'; Con: Braam van Straaten 21', 26', 51', 59' (4/6); Frederick Barend Prinsloo 77' (1/1); Pen: Braam van Straaten 6', 42' (2/2)	Scoreboard	Try: Tiger Mangweni 66'; Akona Ndungane 70', 72', 79'; Con: Reinhardt Gerber (0/1); Tiger Mangweni 71', 73', 80' (3/3); Pen: Reinhardt Gerber 2', 30' (2/2)	Attendance: 1,000

Bye/s: Pumas

===== Round three =====
8 July 2005	Pumas	9–26	Griquas	Puma Stadium, Witbank
19:10	Pen: Casper Steyn 22', 24', 33' (3/4)	Scoreboard	Try: penalty try 30'; Dries Scholtz 54'; Con: Braam van Straaten 31', 55' (2/2); Pen: Braam van Straaten 12', 37', 42', 76' (4/6); Drop: Braam van Straaten (0/1)	Attendance: 1,500; Referee: Marius Jonker

9 July 2005	Leopards	32–43	Western Province	Olën Park, Potchefstroom
16:00	Try: Anvor Schooney 1', 35'; Deon van Rensburg 41'; Colin Lloyd 63'; Con: Naas Olivier 2', 36', 42' (3/4); Pen: Naas Olivier 9', 48' (2/2); Cards: Jonathan Mokuena (yellow card) 38'; Ronnie Uys (yellow card) 73'	Scoreboard	Try: Egon Seconds 3', 25'; Eddie Andrews 32'; Hendrik Gerber 39'; Bolla Conradie 45'; Adri Badenhorst 62'; Con: Chris Rossouw 4', 26', 34', 40', 46' (5/6); Pen: Chris Rossouw 71' (1/1)	Attendance: 3,000; Referee: Phillip Anthony Bosch

9 July 2005	Border Bulldogs	12–18	Free State Cheetahs	Buffalo City Stadium, East London
17:00	Try: Reinhardt Gerber 11'; Akona Ndungane 22'; Con: Reinhardt Gerber 23' (1/2); Pen: Reinhardt Gerber (0/1)	Scoreboard	Pen: Willem de Waal 18', 28', 37', 41', 46', 68' (6/7)	Attendance: 2,000; Referee: Shaun Veldsman

Bye/s: Griffons

===== Round four =====
15 July 2005	Griffons	49–16	Leopards	North West Stadium, Welkom
19:00	Try: Birtie Powell 8'; Martinus Petrus Goosen 11', 30', 79'; Oshwell Damons 53'; Bernardus van Blerk 58'; Con: Andries Hough 9', 12', 31', 54', 59' (5/5); Pen: Andries Hough 4', 24', 60' (3/3); Cards: Jeandrè Mynhardt (yellow card) 59'	Scoreboard	Try: Ronnie Cooke 71'; Con: Naas Olivier 72' (1/1); Pen: Naas Olivier 13', 40', 47' (3/3)

15 July 2005	Western Province	44–3	Border Bulldogs	Newlands Stadium, Cape Town
19:00	Try: Gus Theron 25'; David Hendricks 31'; Louis Loubser 39'; Egon Seconds 65'; Peter Grant 72'; Sarel Potgieter 73'; Con: Chris Rossouw 26', 32' (2/3); Earl Rose 73', 74' (2/3); Pen: Chris Rossouw 21', 53' (2/2)	Scoreboard	Pen: Reinhardt Gerber 18' (1/2); Cards: Michael Coetzee (yellow card) 59'	Attendance: 6,500; Referee: Mark Lawrence

15 July 2005	Free State Cheetahs	50–3	Pumas	Free State Stadium, Bloemfontein
19:10	Try: Kabamba Floors 29'; Ryno van der Merwe 44'; Friedrich Lombard 47'; Michael Claassens 60'; Dewey Floyd Swartbooi 69'; Eddie Fredericks 77'; Con: Willem de Waal 45', 48', 61' (3/4); MJ Smith 78' (1/2); Pen: Willem de Waal 3', 13', 39' (3/3); Drop: Willem de Waal 25' (1/1)	Scoreboard	Pen: Casper Steyn 46' (1/1)

Bye/s: Griquas

===== Round five =====
22 July 2005	Pumas	19–37	Western Province	Puma Stadium, Witbank
19:00	Try: Quintin Geldenhuys 2'; Sam Gerber 39'; Sinethemba Zweni 49'; Con: Casper Steyn 3', 50' (2/2)	Scoreboard	Try: Earl Rose 33', 37'; Sarel Potgieter 43'; Zhahier Ryland 58'; Con: Chris Rossouw 34', 38', 43', 59' (4/4); Pen: Chris Rossouw 11', 16', 62' (3/3)	Attendance: 5,000; Referee: Tappe Henning

22 July 2005	Border Bulldogs	24–17	Griffons	Buffalo City Stadium, East London
19:10	Try: Ryan Pickering 3'; Tiger Mangweni 45'; James Richards 72'; Con: Tiger Mangweni 4', 46', 73' (3/3); Pen: Tiger Mangweni 30' (1/1)	Scoreboard	Try: Martinus Petrus Goosen 71'; Pen: Andries Hough 8', 11', 20', 64' (4/4)	Attendance: 1,500; Referee: Willie Roos

23 July 2005	Griquas	17–19	Free State Cheetahs	Griqua Park, Kimberley
13:00	Try: Evan Botha 40'; Con: Braam van Straaten (0/1); Pen: Braam van Straaten 4', 24', 37', 67' (4/4)	Scoreboard	Try: Eddie Fredericks 33'; Hendro Scholtz 77'; Con: Willem de Waal (0/2); Pen: Willem de Waal 30', 49', 64' (3/3); Cards: Michael Claassens (yellow card) 23'	Referee: Marius Jonker

Bye/s: Leopards

===== Round six =====
29 July 2005	Griffons	19–31	Pumas	North West Stadium, Welkom
19:00	Try: Martinus Petrus Goosen 9'; Con: Andries Hough 10' (1/1); Pen: Andries Hough 4', 8', 25', 60' (4/4); Cards: Ethienne Reynecke (yellow card) 49'	Scoreboard	Try: Sinethemba Zweni 2'; Ashieq Wise 21'; Martin Engelbrecht 50'; Hyron Thyse 62'; Sasha Marot 76'; Con: Casper Steyn 2', 22', 76' (3/5)	Referee: Michael Cupido

29 July 2005	Leopards	52–33	Border Bulldogs	Olën Park, Potchefstroom
19:00	Try: Retief Uys 1'; Jonathan Mokuena 12', 39'; Bertus Swanepoel 34'; Barry Geel 51'; Colin Lloyd 68'; Con: Naas Olivier 2', 35', 40', 52', 69' (5/6); Pen: Naas Olivier 6', 10', 24', 28' (4/5)	Scoreboard	Try: Marcel van der Walt 15'; Werner Coetzer 30'; James Richards 47'; Tiger Mangweni 70'; Ryan Pickering 75'; Con: Reinhardt Gerber 16', 31', 71', 76' (4/5)	Attendance: 600; Referee: Johann Meuwesen

29 July 2005	Western Province	42–16	Griquas	Newlands Stadium, Cape Town
19:00	Try: Luke Watson 9', 15'; Egon Seconds 27', 50'; Pieter Louw 53'; Rob Linde 59'; Con: Earl Rose 10', 16', 28', 51', 54', 60' (6/6); Pen: Earl Rose (0/1)	Scoreboard	Try: Jose van Rensburg 74'; Con: Braam van Straaten 75' (1/1); Pen: Braam van Straaten 24', 30', 42' (3/3)	Attendance: 14,537; Referee: Mark Lawrence

Bye/s: Free State Cheetahs

===== Round seven =====
5 August 2005	Griffons	0–43	Free State Cheetahs	North West Stadium, Welkom
19:00	Cards: Ethienne Reynecke (yellow card) 25'; Marius Visser (yellow card) 79'	Scoreboard	Try: Johann Friedrich Verster 20'; Jannie du Plessis 27'; Dewey Floyd Swartbooi 42'; Darron Nell 52'; Chris Kruger 55'; Philip Burger 70'; Con: MJ Smith 28', 42', 53', 56', 71' (5/5); Pen: MJ Smith 3' (1/1); Cards: Boela du Plooy (yellow card) 67'; Barend Pieterse (yellow card) 79'; Chappy van Vliet (yellow card) 79'	Attendance: 500; Referee: Christian (Christie) du Preez

5 August 2005	Leopards	26–24	Griquas	Potchefstroom University, Potchefstroom
19:00	Try: Colin Lloyd 8'; Hansie van Dyk 79'; Con: Naas Olivier 9', 80' (2/2); Pen: Naas Olivier 14', 39', 42', 59' (4/4)	Scoreboard	Try: Dries Scholtz 22'; Duimpie Theron 35'; Neil Powell 45'; MJ Mentz 54'; Con: Braam van Straaten 23', 46' (2/4)	Attendance: 0 Referee: Willie Roos

5 August 2005	Border Bulldogs	15–28	Pumas	Buffalo City Stadium, East London
19:10	Try: James Richards 11'; Tiger Mangweni 15'; Con: Reinhardt Gerber 16' (1/2); Pen: Reinhardt Gerber 40' (1/1); Drop: Reinhardt Gerber (0/1)	Scoreboard	Try: Tim Dlulane 18'; Sinethemba Zweni 45'; Quintin Geldenhuys 48'; Grant Bartle 72'; Con: Casper Steyn 19', 46', 49' (3/3); Jeandre Fourie 73' (1/1); Cards: Jan Hendrik Cloete (yellow card) 5'	Attendance: 4,000; Referee: Johann Meuwesen

Bye/s: Western Province

== Premier Division ==
=== Competition ===
The eight teams that qualified to the Premier Division remained in the same sections (Section X and Section Y) as they were during the qualifying round.

All the teams played a double round of games against teams in the other section, meaning every team played eight matches – four at home and four away.

Teams received four points for a win and two points for a draw. Bonus points were awarded to teams that scored 4 or more tries in a game, as well as to teams that lost a match by 7 points or less. Teams were ranked by points, then points difference (points scored less points conceded).

The top two teams in each section qualified to the title play-offs, where the section winners would have home advantage against the runners-up.

=== Teams ===
Location of teams in 2005 Currie Cup Premier Division
Section X
Section Y

2005 Currie Cup Premier Division Section X teams
Team	Sponsored Name	Stadium/s	Sponsored Name
Blue Bulls	Vodacom Blue Bulls	Loftus Versfeld, Pretoria	Securicor Loftus
Boland Cavaliers	Boland Cavaliers	Boland Stadium, Wellington	Boland Stadium
Golden Lions	Golden Lions	Ellis Park Stadium, Johannesburg	Ellis Park Stadium
Sharks	Sharks	Kings Park Stadium, Durban	ABSA Stadium
2005 Currie Cup Premier Division Section Y teams
Team	Sponsored Name	Stadium/s	Sponsored Name
Free State Cheetahs	Vodacom Cheetahs	Free State Stadium, Bloemfontein	Vodacom Park
Griquas	Wildeklawer Griquas	Griqua Park, Kimberley	ABSA Park
Leopards	Leopards	Olën Park, Potchefstroom	Olën Park
Western Province	Investec Western Province	Newlands Stadium, Cape Town	Newlands Stadium

=== Logs ===
2005 Currie Cup Premier Division Section X Log
Pos	Team	Pl	W	D	L	PF	PA	PD	TF	TA	TB	LB	Pts
1	Blue Bulls	8	8	0	0	347	115	+232	46	12	5	0	37
2	Golden Lions	8	6	0	2	275	204	+71	32	24	5	1	30
3	Sharks	8	4	0	4	238	235	+3	31	27	3	0	19
4	Boland Cavaliers	8	3	0	5	212	282	–70	28	37	4	1	17
2005 Currie Cup Premier Division Section Y Log
1	Western Province	8	5	0	3	235	179	+56	29	19	5	1	26
2	Free State Cheetahs	8	4	0	4	215	177	+38	22	20	2	2	20
3	Griquas	8	1	0	7	168	308	–140	20	40	4	2	10
4	Leopards	8	1	0	7	218	417	–199	29	58	3	0	7
* Legend: Pos = Position, Pl = Played, W = Won, D = Drawn, L = Lost, PF = Points for, PA = Points against, PD = Points difference, TF = Tries For, TA = Tries Against, TB = Try bonus points, LB = Losing bonus points, Pts = Log points The top 2 teams in each section qualified to the semi-finals. Points breakdown: *4 points for a win *2 points for a draw *1 bonus point for a loss by seven points or less *1 bonus point for scoring four or more tries in a match

=== Results ===
The following fixtures were played:

==== Round one ====
19 August 2005	Sharks	55–17	Leopards	Kings Park Stadium, Durban
19:10	Try: JP Pietersen 2', 37', 44', 55'; Adrian Jacobs 17', 35'; Steven Sykes 25'; Waylon Murray 46', 79'; Con: Ruan Pienaar 18', 38', 45', 56' (4/8); Brett Hennessey 80' (1/1)	Scoreboard	Try: Colin Lloyd 62'; Coenraad Groenewald 73'; Con: Naas Olivier 63', 74' (2/2); Pen: Naas Olivier 13' (1/2)	Referee: Jerome Fortuin

20 August 2005	Boland Cavaliers	29–22	Western Province	Boland Stadium, Wellington
15:00	Try: Henk Eksteen 5'; Jongi Nokwe 11', 50'; Rennie Dazel 44'; Con: Charl Blom 12', 45', 51' (3/4); Drop: Antonius Verhoeven 81' (1/1)	Scoreboard	Try: Adri Badenhorst 26'; Gus Theron 66'; Zhahier Ryland 82', 84'; Con: Earl Rose (0/1); Chris Rossouw 67' (1/3)	Attendance: 0 Referee: Jonathan Kaplan

20 August 2005	Golden Lions	53–11	Griquas	Ellis Park Stadium, Johannesburg
15:00	Try: Marius Hurter 13'; Cobus Grobbelaar 52'; Jorrie Muller 60'; Rudolf Coetzee 65'; Wylie Human 69', 74', 83'; Con: Nel Fourie 14' (1/2); Tiaan Snyman 61', 66', 70', 75', 84' (5/5); Pen: Nel Fourie 1', 34' (2/2)	Scoreboard	Try: MJ Mentz 7'; Con: Braam van Straaten (0/1); Pen: Braam van Straaten 27', 30' (2/4)	Attendance: 5,235; Referee: Tappe Henning

20 August 2005	Blue Bulls	26–16	Free State Cheetahs	Loftus Versfeld, Pretoria
17:00	Try: Morné Steyn 32'; Wynand Olivier 48'; Con: Morné Steyn 33', 49' (2/2); Pen: Morné Steyn 5', 18', 43', 72' (4/4)	Scoreboard	Try: Ollie le Roux 14'; Trompie Nontshinga 62'; Con: Willem de Waal (0/2); Pen: Willem de Waal 47' (1/3); MJ Smith 66' (1/1); Cards: Ollie Le Roux (yellow card) 24' (red card) 49'	Referee: Craig Joubert

==== Round two ====
26 August 2005	Leopards	21–37	Golden Lions	Olën Park, Potchefstroom
19:10	Try: Ronnie Cooke 22', 65'; Colin Lloyd 52'; Con: Naas Olivier 23', 52', 66' (3/3)	Scoreboard	Try: Roland Bernard 2'; Lukas van Biljon 19'; Kleinjan Tromp 43'; Conrad Jantjes 55'; Gerhard Vosloo 74'; Con: Tiaan Snyman 3', 20', 57' (3/4); Nel Fourie (0/1); Pen: Tiaan Snyman 27' (1/2); Drop: Tiaan Snyman 15' (1/1)	Attendance: 3,500; Referee: Linston Manuels

27 August 2005	Free State Cheetahs	46–15	Boland Cavaliers	Free State Stadium, Bloemfontein
15:00	Try: Trompie Nontshinga 17', 51'; Hendro Scholtz 61'; Trevor Leota 72', 77'; Barend Pieterse 74'; Con: Willem de Waal 18', 52', 62', 73', 75' (5/6); Pen: Willem de Waal 28', 55' (2/2)	Scoreboard	Try: Jaco Engels 39'; Piet van Zyl 64'; Con: Charl Blom (0/1); Justin Peach 65' (1/1); Pen: Charl Blom (0/2); Antonius Verhoeven (0/1); Justin Peach 45' (1/1)	Attendance: 5,000; Referee: Marius Jonker

27 August 2005	Griquas	27–28	Sharks	Griqua Park, Kimberley
15:00	Try: Frans Viljoen 32'; Bobby Joubert 57'; Con: Braam van Straaten 33' (1/2); Pen: Braam van Straaten 6', 18', 37', 44', 51' (5/6)	Scoreboard	Try: Waylon Murray 23'; Danie Saayman 54'; Jaco Gouws 77'; Con: Ruan Pienaar 55', 78' (2/3); Pen: Ruan Pienaar 8', 16', 69' (3/3)	Attendance: 3,500; Referee: Shaun Veldsman

27 August 2005	Western Province	10–18	Blue Bulls	Newlands Stadium, Cape Town
17:00	Try: Gus Theron 73'; Con: Earl Rose 74' (1/1); Pen: Chris Rossouw 44' (1/4); Earl Rose (0/1)	Scoreboard	Try: Heini Adams 25'; John Mametsa 67'; Con: Morné Steyn 68' (1/2); Pen: Morné Steyn 10', 58' (2/2); Drop: Morné Steyn (0/1)	Attendance: 20,104; Referee: Mark Lawrence

==== Round three ====
2 September 2005	Blue Bulls	69–24	Leopards	Loftus Versfeld, Pretoria
19:10	Try: Marius Delport 26', 29', 43'; Johan Wasserman 34'; Pedrie Wannenburg 39', 56'; John Mametsa 61'; Johan Roets 71'; Akona Ndungane 76'; Con: Morné Steyn 27', 30', 35', 40', 44', 57', 62' (7/7); Derick Hougaard 72', 77' (2/2); Pen: Morné Steyn 2', 13' (2/2); Cards: Pedrie Wannenburg (yellow card) 25'	Scoreboard	Try: Naas Olivier 48'; Naude Beukes 65'; Anvor Schooney 78'; Con: Naas Olivier 49', 66', 79' (3/3); Pen: Naas Olivier 26' (1/3); Cards: André Swanepoel (yellow card) 33'	Attendance: 0 Referee: Jonathan Kaplan

3 September 2005	Boland Cavaliers	20–36	Griquas	Boland Stadium, Wellington
15:00	Try: Tommy Dixon 32'; Jongi Nokwe 45'; Rayno Benjamin 62'; Con: Justin Peach 63' (1/3); Pen: Justin Peach 10' (1/3)	Scoreboard	Try: Dries Scholtz 12'; Vuyani Dlomo 30', 58'; Gareth Krause 76'; Con: Quintin Jean van Tonder (0/1); Tiger Mangweni 31', 59' (2/3); Pen: Quintin Jean van Tonder 5' (1/2); Tiger Mangweni 23', 25', 54' (3/4); Drop: Quintin Jean van Tonder (0/1)	Attendance: 1,500; Referee: Deon van Blommestein

3 September 2005	Golden Lions	23–38	Western Province	Ellis Park Stadium, Johannesburg
15:00	Try: Jorrie Muller 28'; Oginga Siwundla 70'; Con: Tiaan Snyman 29' (1/1); Nel Fourie 71' (1/1); Pen: Tiaan Snyman 3', 36', 45' (3/5); Nel Fourie (0/1)	Scoreboard	Try: Zhahier Ryland 24', 58', 76'; Tonderai Chavhanga 50'; De Wet Barry 55'; Con: Peter Grant 25', 51', 56', 59', 77' (5/5); Pen: Peter Grant 8' (1/3)	Referee: Craig Joubert

3 September 2005	Sharks	18–29	Free State Cheetahs	Kings Park Stadium, Durban
17:00	Try: Ruan Pienaar 49'; Deon Carstens 54'; Dirk Louw 79'; Con: Ruan Pienaar (0/3); Pen: Ruan Pienaar 5' (1/1)	Scoreboard	Try: Ryno van der Merwe 58'; Eddie Fredericks 65'; Con: Willem de Waal 59', 66' (2/2); Pen: Willem de Waal 8', 18', 39', 67', 78' (5/6); Drop: Willem de Waal (0/1)	Referee: Jerome Fortuin

==== Round four ====
9 September 2005	Leopards	50–47	Boland Cavaliers	Olën Park, Potchefstroom
19:10	Try: Frans Conradie 7'; Ronnie Cooke 15'; Gunder Williamson 20'; Naas Olivier 49'; Jonathan Mokuena 52', 80'; Deon van Rensburg 76'; Con: Naas Olivier 8', 16', 50', 53', 77', 81' (6/7); Pen: Naas Olivier 28' (1/1)	Scoreboard	Try: Rayno Benjamin 2', 70'; Justin Peach 12'; Jongi Nokwe 33', 73'; Charl Blom 58'; Con: Justin Peach 13', 34', 59', 71' (4/6); Pen: Justin Peach 17', 37', 68' (3/4); Drop: Antonius Verhoeven (0/1)	Attendance: 1,500; Referee: Jerome Fortuin

10 September 2005	Free State Cheetahs	20–31	Golden Lions	Free State Stadium, Bloemfontein
15:00	Try: Trompie Nontshinga 34'; Juan Smith 68'; Con: Willem de Waal 35' (1/1); Meyer Bosman 69' (1/1); Pen: Willem de Waal 24', 40' (2/3); Drop: Willem de Waal (0/1)	Scoreboard	Try: Jorrie Muller 1', 20'; Wikus van Heerden 29'; Wayne Julies 47'; Con: André Pretorius 2', 21', 30', 48' (4/4); Pen: André Pretorius (0/1); Drop: André Pretorius 59' (1/3); Jorrie Muller (0/1)	Attendance: 12,560; Referee: Marius Jonker

10 September 2005	Griquas	30–49	Blue Bulls	Griqua Park, Kimberley
15:00	Try: Vuyani Dlomo 13', 57'; Tiger Mangweni 68'; Kobus Grobbelaar 98'; Con: Quintin Jean van Tonder 14', 69' (2/3); Braam van Straaten (0/1); Pen: Quintin Jean van Tonder 25' (1/2); Drop: Quintin Jean van Tonder 8' (1/1)	Scoreboard	Try: JP Nel 17'; Akona Ndungane 21'; Anton Leonard 27'; Pedrie Wannenburg 37', 45'; Bryan Habana 51'; Fourie du Preez 62'; Derick Hougaard 89'; Con: Morné Steyn 22', 52', 63' (3/7); Derick Hougaard (0/1); Pen: Morné Steyn 72' (1/1)	Attendance: 6,000; Referee: Shaun Veldsman

10 September 2005	Western Province	47–19	Sharks	Newlands Stadium, Cape Town
17:00	Try: Jean de Villiers 20', 28', 36'; Joe van Niekerk 46'; Zhahier Ryland 77'; Con: Peter Grant 21', 29', 37', 46', 78' (5/5); Pen: Peter Grant 5', 11', 50', 68' (4/5); Werner Greeff (0/1); Cards: Hanyani Shimange (yellow card) 69'	Scoreboard	Try: Henno Mentz 75'; Con: Percy Montgomery 76' (1/1); Pen: Percy Montgomery 8', 17', 23', 30' (4/4); Cards: Ruan Pienaar (yellow card) 18'; Warren Britz (yellow card) 59'; Adrian Jacobs (yellow card) 81'	Referee: Mark Lawrence

==== Round five ====
16 September 2005	Golden Lions	44–27	Leopards	Ellis Park Stadium, Johannesburg
19:10	Try: James van der Walt 6', 47'; Wayne Julies 25'; Wikus van Heerden 61'; Jaque Fourie 78'; Con: Nel Fourie 7', 26', 48' (3/3); André Pretorius 62', 79' (2/2); Pen: Nel Fourie 22', 43' (2/3); André Pretorius 73' (1/1); Drop: Nel Fourie (0/1)	Scoreboard	Try: Ronnie Cooke 19'; André Swanepoel 42'; Con: Pieter Jordaan 20' (1/2); Pen: Pieter Jordaan 14', 34', 56', 68' (4/4); Colin Lloyd 29' (1/1); Cards: Frans Conradie (yellow card) 72'	Attendance: 3,097; Referee: Tappe Henning

17 September 2005	Boland Cavaliers	21–29	Free State Cheetahs	Boland Stadium, Wellington
15:00	Try: Justin Peach 25'; Henley du Plessis 37'; Rayno Benjamin 49'; Con: Justin Peach (0/3); Pen: Justin Peach 4', 52' (2/3)	Scoreboard	Try: Eddie Fredericks 11', 62'; Con: Willem de Waal 12' (1/1); Meyer Bosman 63' (1/1); Pen: Willem de Waal 1', 43', 55' (3/3); Meyer Bosman 67', 78' (2/3)	Attendance: 650; Referee: Craig Joubert

17 September 2005	Sharks	29–10	Griquas	Kings Park Stadium, Durban
15:00	Try: Craig Davidson 2'; Henno Mentz 45', 61'; John Smit 54'; Con: Percy Montgomery 3', 46', 55' (3/4); Pen: Percy Montgomery 24' (1/2); Drop: Percy Montgomery (0/1)	Scoreboard	Try: Johan Ackermann 67'; Con: Quintin van Tonder 68' (1/1); Drop: Quintin van Tonder 31' (1/1); Cards: Frans Viljoen (yellow card) 78'	Attendance: 22,000; Referee: Linston Manuels

17 September 2005	Blue Bulls	39–3	Western Province	Loftus Versfeld, Pretoria
17:00	Try: Danie Rossouw 24'; Pedrie Wannenburg 32'; Johan Roets 44'; Akona Ndungane 64'; John Mametsa 71'; Con: Derick Hougaard 25', 33', 45', 72' (4/5); Pen: Derick Hougaard 18', 36' (2/2); Drop: Derick Hougaard (0/1)	Scoreboard	Pen: Peter Grant 8' (1/1)	Referee: Jonathan Kaplan

==== Round six ====
23 September 2005	Western Province	47–13	Boland Cavaliers	Newlands Stadium, Cape Town
19:10	Try: Eddie Andrews 24'; Earl Rose 47'; Tonderai Chavhanga 55'; De Wet Barry 66'; Jean de Villiers 74', 77'; Con: Peter Grant 25', 48', 67', 75' (4/5); Earl Rose (0/1); Pen: Peter Grant 6', 12', 27' (3/6)	Scoreboard	Try: Rayno Benjamin 7'; Con: Justin Peach 8' (1/1); Pen: Justin Peach 15', 19' (2/2); Cards: Fabian Brandt (yellow card) 73'	Attendance: 10,456; Referee: Marius Jonker

24 September 2005	Griquas	28–33	Golden Lions	Griqua Park, Kimberley
15:00	Try: Neil Powell 16'; MJ Mentz 37'; Jané Du Toit 54'; Braam van Straaten 58'; Con: Braam van Straaten 17', 38', 55', 59' (4/4); Pen: Braam van Straaten (0/1); Tiger Mangweni (0/1); Drop: Braam van Straaten (0/1)	Scoreboard	Try: Jaque Fourie 12'; Wylie Human 33'; Willem Stoltz 64'; Con: André Pretorius (0/3); Pen: André Pretorius 8', 51', 72' (3/5); Drop: André Pretorius 39', 42', 79' (3/3); Cards: Pietman van Niekerk (yellow card) 60'	Attendance: 1,300; Referee: Jerome Fortuin

24 September 2005	Leopards	43–65	Sharks	Olympia Park, Rustenburg
15:00	Try: Deon van Rensburg 6', 53'; Jaco Hanekom 8'; Naas Olivier 18'; Barry Geel 67'; Nelis Nel 73'; Ronnie Cooke 76'; Con: Naas Olivier 7', 19', 74', 77' (4/7)	Scoreboard	Try: Albert van den Berg 3'; Ruan Pienaar 28'; Brent Russell 33', 78'; Adrian Jacobs 45'; Grant Rees 48'; Cedric Mkhize 51'; John Smit 57'; Jacques Botes 59'; Con: Ruan Pienaar 4', 33', 46' (3/5); Percy Montgomery 52', 57', 59', 79' (4/4); Pen: Ruan Pienaar 10', 20' (2/2)	Attendance: 4,000; Referee: Shaun Veldsman

24 September 2005	Free State Cheetahs	22–26	Blue Bulls	Free State Stadium, Bloemfontein
17:00	Try: Ryno van der Merwe 29'; Con: Willem de Waal 30' (1/1); Pen: Willem de Waal 6', 22', 25', 47', 50' (5/6)	Scoreboard	Try: Wynand Olivier 18'; Bryan Habana 40'; Con: Derick Hougaard 19', 41' (2/2); Pen: Derick Hougaard 11', 33', 53', 72' (4/5); Drop: Derick Hougaard (0/1); Cards: Danie Rossouw (yellow card) 21'	Attendance: 16,770; Referee: Mark Lawrence

==== Round seven ====
30 September 2005	Blue Bulls	59–0	Griquas	Loftus Versfeld, Pretoria
19:10	Try: JP Nel 4'; Gary Botha 18'; Wynand Olivier 26'; Akona Ndungane 32'; Bakkies Botha 38', 50'; Danie Rossouw 57', 65'; Con: Morné Steyn 5', 19', 27', 33', 39', 51', 58', 66' (8/8); Pen: Morné Steyn 9' (1/1)	Scoreboard	Con: Quintin van Tonder (0/1)	Attendance: 16,114; Referee: Willie Roos

1 October 2005	Boland Cavaliers	39–26	Leopards	Boland Stadium, Wellington
15:00	Try: Rayno Benjamin 3'; Jaco Engels 6'; Kobus Meintjes 27'; Antonius Verhoeven 36'; Justin Peach 52'; Con: Justin Peach 4', 28', 37', 53' (4/5); Pen: Justin Peach 22', 45' (2/3); Cards: Antonius Verhoeven (yellow card) 45'	Scoreboard	Try: Ronnie Cooke 72'; Deon van Rensburg 74'; Pellow van der Westhuizen 87'; Ronnie Uys 94'; Con: Naas Olivier 73', 88', 95' (3/4); Cards: Retief Uys (yellow card) 31'; Colin Lloyd (yellow card) 45'	Attendance: 900; Referee: Marius Jonker

1 October 2005	Sharks	21–45	Western Province	Kings Park Stadium, Durban
15:00	Try: Henno Mentz 40'; Grant Rees 44'; Con: Percy Montgomery 41' (1/2); Pen: Percy Montgomery 8', 10', 27' (3/4)	Scoreboard	Try: Egon Seconds 46', 49', 58'; Peter Grant 51'; Neil de Kock 66'; Gio Aplon 82'; Con: Peter Grant 47' (1/2); Earl Rose 52' (1/3); Rob Linde 83' (1/1); Pen: Peter Grant 12', 15' (2/3); Earl Rose 73' (1/1)	Attendance: 23,000; Referee: Tappe Henning

1 October 2005	Golden Lions	37–36	Free State Cheetahs	Ellis Park Stadium, Johannesburg
17:00	Try: Wayne Julies 31'; Schalk Brits 52'; Grant Esterhuizen 55'; Cobus Grobbelaar 64'; Con: André Pretorius 32', 53', 56', 65' (4/4); Pen: André Pretorius 28' (1/1); Drop: André Pretorius 17', 45' (2/3)	Scoreboard	Try: Bevin Fortuin 4', 13'; Barend Pieterse 59'; CJ van der Linde 74'; Barry Goodes 75'; Con: Willem de Waal 5', 60', 75', 76' (4/5); Pen: Willem de Waal 25' (1/1); Drop: Willem de Waal (0/1)	Referee: Jonathan Kaplan

==== Round eight ====
7 October 2005	Griquas	26–37	Boland Cavaliers	Griqua Park, Kimberley
15:30	Try: MJ Mentz 3'; Frans Viljoen 10', 80'; Dries Scholtz 56'; Con: Frederick Barend Prinsloo 4', 11', 57' (3/3); Dries Scholtz (0/1); Pen: Frederick Barend Prinsloo (0/1); Cards: Frederick Barend Prinsloo (yellow card) 33'	Scoreboard	Try: Rayno Benjamin 5', 43'; Henk Eksteen 39'; Charl Blom 70'; Con: Justin Peach 6', 40', 44', 71' (4/4); Pen: Justin Peach 13', 34', 52' (3/6)	Attendance: 500; Referee: Craig Joubert

7 October 2005	Leopards	10–61	Blue Bulls	Olympia Park, Rustenburg
19:10	Try: André Swanepoel 18'; Con: Naas Olivier 19' (1/1); Pen: Naas Olivier 8' (1/1); Drop: Naas Olivier (0/1); Cards: Gunder Williamson (yellow card) 61'	Scoreboard	Try: Fourie du Preez 2', 34'; Wynand Olivier 14'; Johan Roets 20', 64'; JP Nel 28'; Jacques Cronjé 44', 69'; Tim Dlulane 62'; Morné Steyn 78'; Con: Morné Steyn 15', 21', 35' (3/8); Derick Hougaard 79' (1/2); Pen: Derick Hougaard 81' (1/2)	Attendance: 21,000; Referee: Mark Lawrence

8 October 2005	Free State Cheetahs	17–3	Sharks	Free State Stadium, Bloemfontein
15:00	Try: Corniel van Zyl 65'; Trompie Nontshinga 72'; Con: Meyer Bosman 66', 73' (2/2); Pen: Meyer Bosman 4' (1/3); Drop: Falie Oelschig (0/1)	Scoreboard	Pen: Ruan Pienaar 15' (1/2)	Referee: Shaun Veldsman

8 October 2005	Western Province	23–17	Golden Lions	Newlands Stadium, Cape Town
17:00	Try: Zhahier Ryland 24'; Hendrik Gerber 55'; Con: Peter Grant 25' (1/1); Earl Rose 56' (1/1); Pen: Peter Grant 18', 30' (2/3); Earl Rose 73' (1/1)	Scoreboard	Try: Conrad Jantjes 10', 80'; Con: Nel Fourie 11' (1/1); André Pretorius 81' (1/1); Pen: Nel Fourie 7' (1/1)	Attendance: 21,647; Referee: Johann Meuwesen

==== Semi-finals ====
15 October 2005	Western Province	11–16	Free State Cheetahs	Newlands Stadium, Cape Town
14:15	Try: Bolla Conradie 75'; Con: Earl Rose (0/1); Pen: Peter Grant 16' (1/2); Earl Rose 83' (1/1)	Scoreboard	Try: Willem de Waal 33'; Con: Willem de Waal 34' (1/1); Pen: Willem de Waal 21', 55', 60' (3/4); Drop: Willem de Waal (0/2); Cards: Hendro Scholtz (yellow card) 41'	Attendance: 35,123; Referee: Tappe Henning

15 October 2005	Blue Bulls	31–23	Golden Lions	Loftus Versfeld, Pretoria
17:00	Try: Pedrie Wannenburg 37'; Anton Leonard 47'; Akona Ndungane 61'; Con: Morné Steyn 38', 62' (2/3); Pen: Morné Steyn 25', 29', 39', 84' (4/5); Drop: Morné Steyn (0/1)	Scoreboard	Try: Wayne Julies 11', 34'; Con: André Pretorius 12', 35' (2/2); Pen: André Pretorius 3', 56', 72' (3/6); Drop: André Pretorius (0/1)	Referee: Mark Lawrence

==== Final ====
22 October 2005	Blue Bulls	25–29	Free State Cheetahs	Loftus Versfeld, Pretoria
16:30	Try: Akona Ndungane 56'; Con: Morné Steyn 57' (1/1); Pen: Morné Steyn 2', 11', 43', 60' (4/5); Derick Hougaard 79' (1/1); Drop: Johan Roets 26' (1/1); Derick Hougaard (0/1); Cards: Victor Matfield (yellow card) 40'; Bryan Habana (yellow card) 74'	Scoreboard	Try: Bevin Fortuin 84'; Meyer Bosman 87'; Con: Willem de Waal 85', 88' (2/2); Pen: Willem de Waal 14', 24', 29', 65', 81' (5/7); Drop: Willem de Waal (0/2); Cards: Os du Randt (yellow card) 40'	Referee: Jonathan Kaplan

2005 ABSA Currie Cup
Premier Division Champions

Free State Cheetahs
2nd title

=== Player statistics ===
The following table contain only points which have been scored in competitive games in the 2005 Currie Cup Premier Division:

All point scorers
No	Player	Team	T	C	P	DG	Pts
1	Willem de Waal	Free State Cheetahs	1	17	27	0	120
2	Morné Steyn	Blue Bulls	2	27	18	0	118
3	Justin Peach	Boland Cavaliers	3	15	14	0	87
4	Peter Grant	Western Province	1	16	14	0	79
5	Naas Olivier	Leopards	3	22	4	0	71
6	André Pretorius	Golden Lions	0	13	8	6	68
7	Ruan Pienaar	Sharks	2	9	7	0	49
8	Derick Hougaard	Blue Bulls	1	9	8	0	47
9	Percy Montgomery	Sharks	0	9	8	0	42
10	Rayno Benjamin	Boland Cavaliers	8	0	0	0	40
11	Braam van Straaten	Griquas	1	5	7	0	36
12	Zhahier Ryland	Western Province	7	0	0	0	35
13	Tiaan Snyman	Golden Lions	0	9	4	1	33
14	Akona Ndungane	Blue Bulls	6	0	0	0	30
14	Pedrie Wannenburg	Blue Bulls	6	0	0	0	30
14	Ronnie Cooke	Leopards	6	0	0	0	30
17	Nel Fourie	Golden Lions	0	6	5	0	27
18	Jean de Villiers	Western Province	5	0	0	0	25
18	Jongi Nokwe	Boland Cavaliers	5	0	0	0	25
18	Trompie Nontshinga	Free State Cheetahs	5	0	0	0	25
18	Wayne Julies	Golden Lions	5	0	0	0	25
22	Johan Roets	Blue Bulls	4	0	0	1	23
23	Meyer Bosman	Free State Cheetahs	1	4	3	0	22
24	Deon van Rensburg	Leopards	4	0	0	0	20
24	Henno Mentz	Sharks	4	0	0	0	20
24	Jorrie Muller	Golden Lions	4	0	0	0	20
24	JP Pietersen	Sharks	4	0	0	0	20
24	Vuyani Dlomo	Griquas	4	0	0	0	20
24	Wylie Human	Golden Lions	4	0	0	0	20
24	Wynand Olivier	Blue Bulls	4	0	0	0	20
24	Earl Rose	Western Province	1	3	3	0	20
32	Tiger Mangweni	Griquas	1	2	3	0	18
32	Quintin van Tonder	Griquas	0	3	2	2	18
34	Charl Blom	Boland Cavaliers	2	3	0	0	16
35	Adrian Jacobs	Sharks	3	0	0	0	15
35	Bevin Fortuin	Free State Cheetahs	3	0	0	0	15
35	Conrad Jantjes	Golden Lions	3	0	0	0	15
35	Danie Rossouw	Blue Bulls	3	0	0	0	15
35	Eddie Fredericks	Free State Cheetahs	3	0	0	0	15
35	Egon Seconds	Western Province	3	0	0	0	15
35	Fourie du Preez	Blue Bulls	3	0	0	0	15
35	Frans Viljoen	Griquas	3	0	0	0	15
35	John Mametsa	Blue Bulls	3	0	0	0	15
35	JP Nel	Blue Bulls	3	0	0	0	15
35	Marius Delport	Blue Bulls	3	0	0	0	15
35	MJ Mentz	Griquas	3	0	0	0	15
35	Waylon Murray	Sharks	3	0	0	0	15
48	Pieter Jordaan	Leopards	0	1	4	0	14
49	Colin Lloyd	Leopards	2	0	1	0	13
50	Anton Leonard	Blue Bulls	2	0	0	0	10
50	Bakkies Botha	Blue Bulls	2	0	0	0	10
50	Barend Pieterse	Free State Cheetahs	2	0	0	0	10
50	Bertus Swanepoel	Leopards	2	0	0	0	10
50	Brent Russell	Sharks	2	0	0	0	10
50	Bryan Habana	Blue Bulls	2	0	0	0	10
50	Cobus Grobbelaar	Golden Lions	2	0	0	0	10
50	De Wet Barry	Western Province	2	0	0	0	10
50	Dries Scholtz	Griquas	2	0	0	0	10
50	Grant Rees	Sharks	2	0	0	0	10
50	Gus Theron	Western Province	2	0	0	0	10
50	Henk Eksteen	Boland Cavaliers	2	0	0	0	10
50	Jaco Engels	Boland Cavaliers	2	0	0	0	10
50	Jacques Cronjé	Blue Bulls	2	0	0	0	10
50	James van der Walt	Golden Lions	2	0	0	0	10
50	Jaque Fourie	Golden Lions	2	0	0	0	10
50	John Smit	Sharks	2	0	0	0	10
50	Jonathan Mokuena	Leopards	2	0	0	0	10
50	Ryno van der Merwe	Free State Cheetahs	2	0	0	0	10
50	Tonderai Chavhanga	Western Province	2	0	0	0	10
50	Trevor Leota	Free State Cheetahs	2	0	0	0	10
50	Wikus van Heerden	Golden Lions	2	0	0	0	10
72	Antonius Verhoeven	Boland Cavaliers	1	0	0	1	8
73	Ederich Prinsloo	Griquas	0	3	0	0	6
74	Adri Badenhorst	Western Province	1	0	0	0	5
74	Albert van den Berg	Sharks	1	0	0	0	5
74	Anvor Schooney	Leopards	1	0	0	0	5
74	Barry Geel	Leopards	1	0	0	0	5
74	Barry Goodes	Free State Cheetahs	1	0	0	0	5
74	Bolla Conradie	Western Province	1	0	0	0	5
74	Cedric Mkhize	Sharks	1	0	0	0	5
74	CJ van der Linde	Free State Cheetahs	1	0	0	0	5
74	Coenraad Groenewald	Leopards	1	0	0	0	5
74	Corniel van Zyl	Free State Cheetahs	1	0	0	0	5
74	Danie Saayman	Sharks	1	0	0	0	5
74	Deon Carstens	Sharks	1	0	0	0	5
74	Dirk Louw	Sharks	1	0	0	0	5
74	Eddie Andrews	Western Province	1	0	0	0	5
74	Frans Conradie	Leopards	1	0	0	0	5
74	Gareth Krause	Griquas	1	0	0	0	5
74	Gary Botha	Blue Bulls	1	0	0	0	5
74	Gerhard Vosloo	Golden Lions	1	0	0	0	5
74	Gio Aplon	Western Province	1	0	0	0	5
74	Graig Davidson	Sharks	1	0	0	0	5
74	Grant Esterhuizen	Golden Lions	1	0	0	0	5
74	Gunder Williamson	Leopards	1	0	0	0	5
74	Heini Adams	Blue Bulls	1	0	0	0	5
74	Hendrik Gerber	Western Province	1	0	0	0	5
74	Hendro Scholtz	Free State Cheetahs	1	0	0	0	5
74	Henley du Plessis	Boland Cavaliers	1	0	0	0	5
74	Jaco Hanekom	Leopards	1	0	0	0	5
74	Jaco Gouws	Sharks	1	0	0	0	5
74	Kobus Meintjes	Boland Cavaliers	1	0	0	0	5
74	Jacques Botes	Sharks	1	0	0	0	5
74	Jané Du Toit	Griquas	1	0	0	0	5
74	Joe van Niekerk	Western Province	1	0	0	0	5
74	Johan Ackermann	Griquas	1	0	0	0	5
74	Johan Wasserman	Blue Bulls	1	0	0	0	5
74	Juan Smith	Free State Cheetahs	1	0	0	0	5
74	Kleinjan Tromp	Golden Lions	1	0	0	0	5
74	Kobus Grobbelaar	Griquas	1	0	0	0	5
74	Lukas van Biljon	Golden Lions	1	0	0	0	5
74	Marius Hurter	Golden Lions	1	0	0	0	5
74	Naude Beukes	Leopards	1	0	0	0	5
74	Neil de Kock	Western Province	1	0	0	0	5
74	Neil Powell	Griquas	1	0	0	0	5
74	Oginga Siwundla	Golden Lions	1	0	0	0	5
74	Ollie le Roux	Free State Cheetahs	1	0	0	0	5
74	Pellow van der Westhuizen	Leopards	1	0	0	0	5
74	Petrus Cornelius Nel	Leopards	1	0	0	0	5
74	Piet van Zyl	Boland Cavaliers	1	0	0	0	5
74	Rennie Dazel	Boland Cavaliers	1	0	0	0	5
74	Roland Bernard	Golden Lions	1	0	0	0	5
74	Ronnie Uys	Leopards	1	0	0	0	5
74	Rudolf Coetzee	Golden Lions	1	0	0	0	5
74	Schalk Brits	Golden Lions	1	0	0	0	5
74	Steven Sykes	Sharks	1	0	0	0	5
74	Tim Dlulane	Blue Bulls	1	0	0	0	5
74	Tommy Dixon	Boland Cavaliers	1	0	0	0	5
74	Willem Stoltz	Golden Lions	1	0	0	0	5
74	Chris Rossouw	Western Province	0	1	1	0	5
131	MJ Smith	Free State Cheetahs	0	0	1	0	3
132	Brett Hennessey	Sharks	0	1	0	0	2
132	Rob Linde	Western Province	0	1	0	0	2

== First Division ==
=== Competition ===
The six teams that qualified to the First Division remained in the same sections (Section X and Section Y) as they were during the qualifying round.

All the teams played a double round of games against teams in the other section, meaning every team played six matches – three at home and three away.

Teams received four points for a win and two points for a draw. Bonus points were awarded to teams that scored 4 or more tries in a game, as well as to teams that lost a match by 7 points or less. Teams were ranked by points, then points difference (points scored less points conceded).

The top two teams in each section qualified to the title play-offs, where the section winners would have home advantage against the runners-up in the same section.

=== Teams ===
Location of teams in 2005 Currie Cup First Division
Section X
Section Y

2005 Currie Cup First Division Section X teams
Team	Sponsored Name	Stadium/s	Sponsored Name
Falcons	AMD Falcons	Bosman Stadium, Brakpan	Bosman Stadium
Mighty Elephants	Mighty Elephants	EPRU Stadium, Port Elizabeth	EPRU Stadium
SWD Eagles	SWD Eagles	Outeniqua Park, George	Outeniqua Park
2005 Currie Cup qualifying round Section Y teams
Team	Sponsored Name	Stadium/s	Sponsored Name
Border Bulldogs	Border Bulldogs	Buffalo City Stadium, East London	ABSA Stadium
Griffons	Griffons	North West Stadium, Welkom	North West Stadium
Pumas	@lantic Pumas	Puma Stadium, Witbank	@lantic Park

=== Logs ===
2005 Currie Cup First Division Section X Log
Pos	Team	Pl	W	D	L	PF	PA	PD	TF	TA	TB	LB	Pts
1	Falcons	6	5	0	1	190	161	+29	21	19	2	0	22
2	Mighty Elephants	6	3	0	3	187	180	+7	23	22	3	1	16
3	SWD Eagles	6	3	0	3	193	241	–48	21	32	2	1	15
2005 Currie Cup First Division Section Y Log
1	Pumas	6	4	0	2	185	159	+26	22	15	3	2	21
2	Griffons	6	3	0	3	227	206	+21	30	27	4	1	17
3	Border Bulldogs	6	0	0	6	170	205	–35	21	23	3	4	7
* Legend: Pos = Position, Pl = Played, W = Won, D = Drawn, L = Lost, PF = Points for, PA = Points against, PD = Points difference, TF = Tries For, TA = Tries Against, TB = Try bonus points, LB = Losing bonus points, Pts = Log points The top 2 teams in each section qualified to the semi-finals. Points breakdown: *4 points for a win *2 points for a draw *1 bonus point for a loss by seven points or less *1 bonus point for scoring four or more tries in a match

=== Results ===
The following fixtures were played:

==== Round one ====
19 August 2005	Mighty Elephants	56–21	Griffons	EPRU Stadium, Port Elizabeth
17:00	Try: Wayne Bennett 9'; Fabian Juries 31', 46'; Wayne van Heerden 41'; Baldwin McBean 53', 80'; Willie Bower 55'; Dean Hopp 78'; Con: Chris Jonck 32', 47', 56' (3/6); Monwabisi Mdyesha 79', 81' (2/2); Pen: Chris Jonck 5', 19' (2/2)	Scoreboard	Try: Ockie van Zyl 13'; Andries Hough 37', 67'; Con: Andries Hough 14', 38', 68' (3/3)	Attendance: 500; Referee: Louis Mzomba

20 August 2005	Falcons	34–28	Border Bulldogs	Bosman Stadium, Brakpan
15:00	Try: Jacques Nieuwenhuis 6'; Willem Slabbert 50', 67'; Louis Strydom 59'; Con: Louis Strydom 7', 51', 60', 67' (4/4); Riaan Viljoen (0/1); Pen: Louis Strydom 15', 20' (2/3); Drop: Louis Strydom (0/1); Cards: Tenk Hendriks (yellow card) 25'; Gustav Japhta (yellow card) 74'	Scoreboard	Try: Josh Fowles 11'; Ian Fihlani 13'; Fergus Kennedy 75'; Con: Tiger Mangweni 12', 14' (2/3); Pen: Tiger Mangweni 3', 42', 61' (3/3); Cards: Zolani Mofu (yellow card) 29'	Attendance: 300; Referee: Christie du Preez

20 August 2005	SWD Eagles	35–38	Pumas	Outeniqua Park, George
15:00	Try: Davon Raubenheimer 26'; Ashwin Scott 46'; Con: Danie de Beer 27', 47' (2/2); Pen: Danie de Beer 2', 6', 15', 17', 24', 61' (6/7); Drop: Danie de Beer 28' (1/1)	Scoreboard	Try: Duane Vermeulen 12'; Pierre du Toit 21'; Donovan Raw 38'; Sean Johnson 66' penalty try 74'; Con: Casper Steyn 12', 22', 38' (3/3); Jeandre Fourie 67', 74' (2/2); Pen: Casper Steyn 1' (1/1)	Attendance: 700; Referee: Stuart Berry

==== Round two ====
26 August 2005	Pumas	36–29	Mighty Elephants	Puma Stadium, Witbank
19:00	Try: Hannes Franklin 15'; Ashieq Wise 22'; Jan Hendrik Cloete 45'; Donovan Raw 50'; Sasha Marot 72'; Con: Jeandre Fourie 16', 23' (2/3); Donovan Raw 51' (1/1); Casper Steyn 73' (1/1); Pen: Jeandre Fourie 40' (1/3)	Scoreboard	Try: Fabian Juries 3', 28'; Con: Chris Jonck 4', 29' (2/2); Pen: Chris Jonck 17', 24', 39', 66', 80' (5/6)	Attendance: 400; Referee: Eugene Daniels

26 August 2005	Border Bulldogs	41–48	SWD Eagles	Buffalo City Stadium, East London
19:10	Try: Fergus Kennedy 31'; Ian Fihlani 47'; Josh Fowles 60'; Braden Ferreira 69'; Michael Coetzee 73'; Con: Reinhardt Gerber 32', 48', 61', 70', 74' (5/5); Pen: Reinhardt Gerber 18', 38' (2/2)	Scoreboard	Try: Evert Kleynhaus 1', 67'; Tewis de Bruyn 45'; Bossie Clarke 50', 54'; Con: Danie de Beer 2', 46', 51', 68' (4/5); Pen: Danie de Beer 25', 27', 29', 42', 63' (5/5)	Attendance: 800; Referee: Pieter de Bruin

27 August 2005	Griffons	20–39	Falcons	North West Stadium, Welkom
16:00	Try: Jaun de Wit 11'; Ockie van Zyl 36'; Con: Andries Hough 12', 37' (2/2); Pen: Andries Hough 5', 10' (2/2); Cards: Jeandrè Mynhardt (yellow card) 15'	Scoreboard	Try: Brendon April 22', 54', 65'; Willem Slabbert 46'; Piet Krause 75'; Con: Louis Strydom 23', 47', 55', 66' (4/5); Pen: Louis Strydom 3', 63' (2/2)	Referee: Christie du Preez

==== Round three ====
2 September 2005	Mighty Elephants	17–9	Border Bulldogs	EPRU Stadium, Port Elizabeth
19:00	Try: Basil de Doncker 13'; Ayanda Sam Willard 32'; Con: Chris Jonck 14', 33' (2/2); Pen: Chris Jonck 77' (1/3); Cards: Wayne van Heerden (yellow card) 63'; Dean Hopp (yellow card) 63'	Scoreboard	Pen: Dru Nicky Nass 52', 57' (2/2); Oliver Peter Fowles 71' (1/1); Cards: James Richards (yellow card) 22'; Michael Coetzee (yellow card) 63'; Zolani Mofu (yellow card) 63'	Referee: Jerome America

3 September 2005	SWD Eagles	33–26	Griffons	Outeniqua Park, George
15:15	Try: Johannes Izak Adolf Saayman 33'; Daniel Philander 47'; Spencer Pearson Wakeling 75'; Con: Dirk Johannes Snyman 34', 48', 76' (3/3); Pen: Dirk Johannes Snyman 39', 63', 71' (3/3); Drop: Dirk Johannes Snyman 6' (1/2); Cards: Barry Jacobsz (yellow card) 59'	Scoreboard	Try: Oshwell Damons 4'; Martinus Petrus Goosen 22'; Viliami Vunipola 27'; Jep Ras 50'; Con: Andries Hough 23', 28', 51' (3/4); Cards: Hein Edwards (yellow card) 13'; Schalk Jacobus de Klerk (yellow card) 58'	Attendance: 700; Referee: Johann Meuwesen

3 September 2005	Falcons	25–18	Pumas	Bosman Stadium, Brakpan
16:00	Try: Brendon April 10'; Frikkie Swart 43'; Tenk Hendriks 57'; Con: Louis Strydom 11', 58' (2/3); Pen: Louis Strydom 30', 71' (2/2); Drop: Louis Strydom (0/2); Cards: Riaan Hefer (yellow card) 73'	Scoreboard	Try: Duane Vermeulen 70'; Hyron Thyse 78'; Con: Jeandre Fourie (0/1); Casper Steyn 79' (1/1); Pen: Casper Steyn 38', 50' (2/2); Drop: Casper Steyn (0/1)	Attendance: 2,000; Referee: Eugene Daniels

==== Round four ====
9 September 2005	Border Bulldogs	36–37	Falcons	Buffalo City Stadium, East London
19:00	Try: Josh Fowles 4'; Braden Ferreira 39'; James Richards 59'; Delarey du Preez 67'; Zolani Mofu 74'; Con: James Richards 5', 40' (2/2); Reinhardt Gerber 60', 75' (2/3); Pen: James Richards 25' (1/1); Reinhardt Gerber (0/2)	Scoreboard	Try: Tenk Hendriks 8'; Jaco Strachan 32'; Jacques Booysen 78'; Con: Louis Strydom 33', 79' (2/3); Pen: Louis Strydom 12', 16', 46', 52', 64', 93' (6/7)	Attendance: 2,000; Referee: Allister van Wyk

9 September 2005	Griffons	63–33	Mighty Elephants	North West Stadium, Welkom
19:00	Try: Ockie van Zyl 4'; Jaun de Wit 6', 51'; Collen Radebe 11', 13'; Christo van Niekerk 32'; Jeandrè Mynhardt 59'; Martinus Petrus Goosen 71'; Con: Andries Hough 5', 7', 14', 33', 52', 60', 72' (7/8); Pen: Andries Hough 20', 23', 30' (3/4); Drop: Andries Hough (0/1)	Scoreboard	Try: Baldwin McBean 15', 39'; Michael Vermaak 28'; Clinton van Rensburg 37'; Barend du Plessis 45'; Con: Chris Jonck 16', 29', 38', 46' (4/5)	Referee: Deon van Blommestein

10 September 2005	Pumas	42–25	SWD Eagles	Puma Stadium, Witbank
16:00	Try: Duane Vermeulen 12'; Francois Visser 18'; Hyron Thyse 49'; Jan Hendrik Cloete 80'; Sean Johnson 86'; Con: Casper Steyn 14', 18', 81', 86' (4/5); Pen: Casper Steyn 3', 57', 61' (3/3)	Scoreboard	Try: Johannes Izak Adolf Saayman 27'; Valentine van Wyk 42'; Bossie Clarke 76'; Con: Dirk Johannes Snyman 28', 43' (2/3); Pen: Dirk Johannes Snyman 17', 32' (2/3); Cards: Davon Raubenheimer (yellow card) 60'	Attendance: 800; Referee: Christie du Preez

==== Round five ====
17 September 2005	SWD Eagles	37–36	Border Bulldogs	Outeniqua Park, George
15:00	Try: Jeremy Plaatjies 12'; Morne Kruger 40'; Warren Malgas 65'; Ashley Buys 74'; Valentine van Wyk 76'; Con: Dirk Johannes Snyman 13' (1/2); Daniel Philander 75', 76' (2/3); Pen: Dirk Johannes Snyman (0/1); Daniel Philander 51', 78' (2/2); Drop: Dirk Johannes Snyman (0/1)	Scoreboard	Try: Braden Ferreira 7', 31'; Stephan Britz 29', 58'; Ian Fihlani 34'; Con: James Richards 30', 32', 35', 59' (4/5); Pen: James Richards 53' (1/2)	Attendance: 200; Referee: Phillip Anthony Bosch

17 September 2005	Falcons	30–39	Griffons	Bosman Stadium, Brakpan
16:00	Try: Jacques Booysen 17'; Riaan Hefer 31', 34'; Con: Riaan Viljoen 18', 32', 35' (3/3); Pen: Riaan Viljoen 47' (1/3); Louis Strydom 57', 62' (2/2); Cards: Trevor Crouse (yellow card) 42'	Scoreboard	Try: Martinus Petrus Goosen 20'; Jeandrè Mynhardt 43'; Collen Radebe 48'; Tobela Mdaka 55'; Gert Ignatius van Rooyen 59'; Con: Andries Hough 21', 44', 49', 56' (4/5); Pen: Andries Hough 3', 69' (2/2)	Attendance: 220; Referee: Willie Roos

17 September 2005	Mighty Elephants	20–31	Pumas	EPRU Stadium, Port Elizabeth
16:30	Try: Fabian Juries 4'; Baldwin McBean 80'; Con: Chris Jonck 5', 81' (2/2); Pen: Chris Jonck 17', 43' (2/4); Cards: Willie Bower (yellow card) 39'	Scoreboard	Try: Sasha Marot 62'; Jan Hendrik Cloete 66'; Hyron Thyse 78'; Con: Casper Steyn 67', 79' (2/3); Pen: Casper Steyn 7', 13', 46', 57' (4/5); Jeandre Fourie (0/1); Drop: Jeandre Fourie (0/1)	Attendance: 300; Referee: Louis Mzomba

==== Round six ====
23 September 2005	Pumas	20–25	Falcons	Puma Stadium, Witbank
19:00	Try: Sasha Marot 14'; Casper Steyn 57'; Con: Casper Steyn 15', 58' (2/2); Pen: Casper Steyn 6', 62' (2/3); Cards: Hannes Franklin (yellow card) 27'	Scoreboard	Try: Dean Okkers 15'; Brendon April 18'; Frikkie Swart 73'; Con: Louis Strydom 16', 19' (2/3); Pen: Louis Strydom 9', 31' (2/3); Cards: Gert-Andries van der Merwe (yellow card) 27'	Attendance: 1,000; Referee: Pieter de Bruin

23 September 2005	Border Bulldogs	20–32	Mighty Elephants	Buffalo City Stadium, East London
19:10	Try: Braden Ferreira 9'; Zolani Mofu 40'; Delarey du Preez 52'; Con: James Richards 41' (1/2); Thembani Mkokeli (0/1); Pen: James Richards 66' (1/3); Cards: Zolani Mofu (yellow card) 70'; Ian Fihlani (yellow card) 74'	Scoreboard	Try: Bertus Smit 17'; JJ Pienaar 48'; Ayanda Sam Willard 59'; Barend du Plessis 75'; Con: Chris Jonck 18' (1/2); Monwabisi Mdyesha 60', 76' (2/2); Pen: Chris Jonck (0/2); Monwabisi Mdyesha 70', 86' (2/2); Drop: Monwabisi Mdyesha (0/1); Cards: Willie Bower (yellow card) 30'; Sebastian Hilpert (yellow card) 66'	Attendance: 500; Referee: Stuart Berry

24 September 2005	Griffons	58–15	SWD Eagles	North West Stadium, Welkom
16:00	Try: Gert Ignatius van Rooyen 10'; Christo van Niekerk 24', 80'; Ockie van Zyl 32'; Schalk Jacobus de Klerk 42'; Tobela Mdaka 70'; Ethienne Reynecke 74'; Collen Radebe 75'; Con: Andries Hough 24', 42' (2/4); Jaco Steenberg 70', 74', 75', 80' (4/4); Pen: Andries Hough 1', 22' (2/3)	Scoreboard	Try: Bossie Clarke 7'; Valentine van Wyk 16'; Bennie van Vuuren 66'; Con: Daniel Philander (0/2); Dirk Johannes Snyman (0/1); Cards: Bennie van Vuuren (yellow card) 76'	Attendance: 500; Referee: Cobus Wessels

==== Semi-finals ====
30 September 2005	Pumas	40–27	Griffons	Puma Stadium, Witbank
19:00	Try: Hyron Thyse 20'; Riaan van der Merwe 60'; Jeandre Fourie 73'; Hannes Franklin 77'; Con: Casper Steyn 21', 61', 73', 77' (4/4); Pen: Casper Steyn 3', 27', 36', 51' (4/4); Drop: Casper Steyn (0/1)	Scoreboard	Try: Gert Ignatius van Rooyen 16'; Tobela Mdaka 65'; Ethienne Reynecke 87'; Con: Andries Hough 17', 66', 88' (3/3); Pen: Andries Hough 9', 39' (2/2); Drop: Viliami Vunipola (0/1)	Attendance: 600; Referee: Linston Manuels

1 October 2005	Falcons	35–31	Mighty Elephants	Bosman Stadium, Brakpan
16:00	Try: Jacques Nieuwenhuis 13'; Piet Krause 25'; Dean Okkers 59'; Riaan Viljoen 70'; Con: Louis Strydom 13', 25', 59' (3/4); Pen: Louis Strydom 9', 40', 75' (3/4)	Scoreboard	Try: Ayanda Sam Willard 4'; Baldwin McBean 32'; Elroy Ligman 45'; Wayne van Heerden 53'; Con: Chris Jonck 4', 32', 45', 53' (4/4); Pen: Chris Jonck 18' (1/1)	Attendance: 400; Referee: Deon van Blommestein

==== Final ====
14 October 2005	Falcons	16–25	Pumas	Bosman Stadium, Brakpan
19:10	Try: Brendon April 39'; Con: Riaan Viljoen 40' (1/1); Pen: Louis Strydom 2', 53' (2/7); Riaan Viljoen (0/1); Drop: Riaan Viljoen 8' (1/1); Willem Slabbert (0/1); Cards: Gavin Stuart Whittingham (yellow card) 32'; Willem Slabbert (yellow card) 55'	Scoreboard	Try: Lourens Dunn 58'; Con: Casper Steyn 59' (1/1); Pen: Casper Steyn 4', 11', 33', 57', 71' (5/5); Drop: Jeandre Fourie (0/1); Casper Steyn 44' (1/3); Cards: Hannes Franklin (yellow card) 45'; Grant Bartle (yellow card) 52'	Attendance: 3,800; Referee: Craig Joubert

2005 ABSA Currie Cup
First Division Champions

Pumas
1st title
