= 2003 Currie Cup =

Domestic rugby union competition

2003 Currie Cup Premier Division
- Countries: South Africa
- Date: 26 July – 1 November 2003
- Champions: Blue Bulls (20th title)
- Runners-up: Sharks

The 2003 Currie Cup was the 2003 season of the South African domestic rugby union competition, the Absa Currie Cup premier division, played from 26 July 2003 – 1 November 2003. The 2003 Currie Cup saw the implementation of a new format for the tournament with the Cup being split into two divisions, the Premier Division and a lower division. The Premier Division consisting of the top six provincial teams and the lower division consisting of eight teams for a total of 14 teams participating in the Currie Cup. The teams in the divisions played matches among themselves with top teams progressing to the finals. The finals were played at Loftus Versfeld Stadium where the Blue Bulls beat the Sharks 40–19 to win the cup. This was the second in a streak of three consecutive Currie Cup wins for the Blue Bulls between 2002 and 2004. The Blue Bulls' Ettienne Botha scored two tries in the final. This equalled the record for tries scored in a Currie Cup final at the time.

== Team standings ==
2003 Currie Cup Premier Division standings
Pos	Team	Pld	W	D	L	PF	PA	PD	TF	TA	TB	LB	Pts	Qualification
1	Blue Bulls	14	11	0	3	538	372	+166	73	44	9	2	55	Grand Final
2	Sharks	15	10	0	5	462	329	+133	61	45	9	3	52	Grand Final
3	Western Province	16	8	3	5	576	447	+129	79	48	12	1	51	
4	Golden Lions	14	8	1	5	530	428	+102	63	52	7	3	44	
5	Free State Cheetahs	15	5	2	8	530	470	+60	66	55	9	2	35	
6	Pumas	15	6	0	9	447	488	−41	47	69	7	2	33	
7	Griquas	12	3	0	9	355	613	−258	48	80	7	1	20	
8	SWD Eagles	14	2	0	12	382	673	−291	48	92	7	2	17	

Rules for classification: 4 points for a win; 2 points for a draw; 1 bonus point for a loss by seven points or less; 1 bonus point for scoring four or more tries in a match

== Fixtures ==
=== Round 1 ===
Source of matches

25 July 2003	Natal Sharks	45–13	SWD Eagles	Durban

26 July 2003	Free State Cheetahs	54–14	Griquas	Bloemfontein

26 July 2003	Blue Bulls	64–29	Western Province	Securicor Loftus
	Try: Danie Rossouw, Derick Hougaard, Fourie du Preez, Frikkie Welsh, Johan Roets (3), Johan Wasserman; Con: Derick Hougaard (5), Francois (Swys) Swart; Pen: Derick Hougaard (2); Drop: Derick Hougaard (2)		Try: Leon Minnaar van den Heever, Neil de Kock, Pietie Ferreira, Quinton Davids; Con: Chris Rossouw (3); Pen: Chris Rossouw	Attendance: 18,744

27 July 2003	Golden Lions	38–34	Pumas	Johannesburg

=== Round 2 ===
1 August 2003	SWD Eagles	23–32	Blue Bulls	Outeniqua Park
	Try: Philip Burger (2), Willem (Willie) Nagel; Con: Rynhard van As; Pen: Rynhard van As (2)		Try: Johan Roets, Norman Jordaan; Con: Derick Hougaard (2); Pen: Derick Hougaard (5); Drop: Derick Hougaard

2 August 2003	Pumas	55–46	Free State Cheetahs	Witbank

2 August 2003	Griquas	32–47	Natal Sharks	Kimberley

2 August 2003	Western Province	59–16	Golden Lions	Cape Town

=== Round 3 ===
8 August 2003	Griquas	24–47	SWD Eagles	Kimberley

9 August 2003	Free State Cheetahs	36–36	Western Province	Bloemfontein

9 August 2003	Natal Sharks	44–20	Pumas	Durban

9 August 2003	Golden Lions	23–28	Blue Bulls	Johannesburg

=== Round 4 ===
15 August 2003	Pumas	40–26	Griquas	Witbank

16 August 2003	Western Province	34–39	Natal Sharks	Cape Town

16 August 2003	SWD Eagles	29–52	Golden Lions	George

16 August 2003	Blue Bulls	36–19	Free State Cheetahs	Securicor Loftus

=== Round 5 ===
23 August 2003	Sharks	35–28	Blue Bulls	Absa Stadium

23 August 2003	Pumas	49–17	SWD Eagles	Witbank

23 August 2003	Griquas	43–60	Western Province	Kimberley

23 August 2003	Free State Cheetahs	22–40	Golden Lions	Bloemfontein

=== Round 6 ===
29 August 2003	Blue Bulls	15–19	Griquas	Securicor Loftus

30 August 2003	Golden Lions	42–38	Natal Sharks	Johannesburg

30 August 2003	Free State Cheetahs	67–23	SWD Eagles	Bloemfontein

30 August 2003	Western Province	44–20	Pumas	Cape Town

=== Round 7 ===
6 September 2003	Natal Sharks	24–10	Free State Cheetahs	Durban

6 September 2003	Griquas	25–24	Golden Lions	Kimberley

6 September 2003	SWD Eagles	41–59	Western Province	George

6 September 2003	Pumas	22–41	Blue Bulls	@lantic Park

=== Round 8 ===
13 September 2003	Pumas	31–33	Golden Lions	Witbank

13 September 2003	Griquas	19–75	Free State Cheetahs	Kimberley

13 September 2003	SWD Eagles	29–37	Natal Sharks	George

13 September 2003	Western Province	63–26	Blue Bulls	Newlands

=== Round 9 ===
20 September 2003	Free State Cheetahs	37–40	Pumas	Bloemfontein

20 September 2003	Natal Sharks	48–15	Griquas	Durban

20 September 2003	Blue Bulls	61–20	SWD Eagles	Securicor Loftus

20 September 2003	Golden Lions	26–26	Western Province	Johannesburg

=== Round 10 ===
26 September 2003	SWD Eagles	37–32	Griquas	George

27 September 2003	Western Province	36–36	Free State Cheetahs	Cape Town

27 September 2003	Pumas	35–27	Natal Sharks	Witbank

27 September 2003	Blue Bulls	52–40	Golden Lions	Securicor Loftus

=== Round 11 ===
3 October 2003	Griquas	31–22	Pumas	Kimberley

4 October 2003	Free State Cheetahs	24–51	Blue Bulls	Vodacom Park

4 October 2003	Golden Lions	104–14	SWD Eagles	Johannesburg

4 October 2003	Natal Sharks	18–6	Western Province	Durban

=== Round 12 ===
10 October 2003	SWD Eagles	27–37	Pumas	Outeniqua Park

11 October 2003	Golden Lions	30–34	Free State Cheetahs	Johannesburg

11 October 2003	Western Province	57–34	Griquas	Cape Town

11 October 2003	Blue Bulls	20–15	Sharks	Securicor Loftus

=== Round 13 ===
17 October 2003	SWD Eagles	38–45	Free State Cheetahs	Outeniqua Park

17 October 2003	Natal Sharks	17–20	Golden Lions	Durban

18 October 2003	Griquas	22–45	Blue Bulls	Griqua Park

18 October 2003	Pumas	24–38	Western Province	Witbank

=== Round 14 ===
25 October 2003	Golden Lions	42–19	Griquas	Johannesburg

25 October 2003	Blue Bulls	39–18	Pumas	Securicor Loftus

25 October 2003	Free State Cheetahs	25–28	Natal Sharks	Bloemfontein

25 October 2003	Western Province	29–24	SWD Eagles	Cape Town

=== Grand Final ===
1 November 2003	Blue Bulls	40–19	Sharks	Securicor Loftus
				Referee: Shaun Veldsman

FB	15	Johan Roets
RW	14	Gavin Passens
OC	13	JP Nel
IC	12	Ettiene Botha
LW	11	John Mametsa
FH	10	Louis Strydom
SH	9	Fourie du Preez
N8	8	Anton Leonard (c)
BF	7	Johan Wasserman
OF	6	Jacques Cronjé
RL	5	Geo Cronjé
LL	4	Pedrie Wannenburg
TP	3	Andries Human
HK	2	Gary Botha
LP	1	Wessel Roux
Substitutes:
HK	16	Kobus van der Walt
PR	17	Sias Wagner
PR	18	Piet Krause
BR	19	Ruan Vermeulen
BR	20	Norman Jordaan
SH	21	Francois Swart
OB	22	Frikkie Welsh
Coach:
Heyneke Meyer

FB	15	Justin Swart
RW	14	Deon Kayser
OC	13	André Snyman
IC	12	Rudi Keil
LW	11	Brent Russell
FH	10	Butch James
SH	9	Craig Davidson
N8	8	Brad MacLeod-Henderson
BF	7	Shaun Sowerby (c)
OF	6	Solly Tyibilika
RL	5	Charl van Rensburg
LL	4	Philip Smit
TP	3	BJ Botha
HK	2	Lukas van Biljon
LP	1	Ollie le Roux
Substitutes:
HK	16	Deon Carstens
PR	17	Eduard Coetzee
PR	18	AJ Venter
BR	19	Luke Watson
SH	20	Dave von Hoesslin
CE	21	Henno Mentz
OB	22	Enrico Swartz
Coach:
