= 2007 Super 14 final =

Men's rugby union club competition

2007 Super 14 Final
Home Team	Sharks
Away Team	Bulls
Date	19 May 2007
Stadium	ABSA Stadium, Durban
- TV in South Africa
Network	SuperSport

The Final of the 2007 Super 14 season, a provincial rugby union competition in the Southern Hemisphere, took place on 19 May 2007 at ABSA Stadium in Durban, South Africa. The match was won by the Bulls 20 points to 19 over their hosts the Sharks. The match had four tries - two by each team, and the last of which was scored by Bulls' wing Bryan Habana in the 82nd minute to give his team the trophy. It was the first Super rugby final to be played in South Africa, as well as the first all-South African final, and the first final with a South African winner.

== Road to the Final ==
The Sharks and Bulls finished the round-robin first and second on the Super 14 table respectively. The Crusaders lost to the Chiefs in their last round-robin match (ending a 26-game home winning streak), but managed to secure a bonus point, losing by seven points. The Blues then defeated the Force in Perth to qualify for the semi-finals. The Sharks then went to the top of the table after defeating the Stormers 36–10 in Cape Town. The Bulls then played the Reds in Pretoria, and would be able to finish in second place if they won by a margin of 72 or more. They ended up crushing the Reds by 92-3 — the largest winning margin in Super Rugby history.

The Sharks then hosted the Blues in Durban, and the Bulls hosted the Crusaders in Pretoria. This was the first time both semi-finals had been hosted in South Africa. The Sharks defeated the Blues 34–18 with three tries to two, and the Bulls defeated the Crusaders 27–12 in a try-less match.

2007 Super 14 Table
Pos	Name	Pld	W	D	L	F	A	+/-	BP	Pts
1	Sharks	13	10	0	3	355	214	141	5	45
2	Bulls	13	9	0	4	388	223	165	6	42
3	Crusaders	13	8	0	5	382	235	147	10	42
4	Blues	13	9	0	4	355	235	120	6	42
5	Brumbies	13	9	0	4	234	173	61	4	40
6	Chiefs	13	7	1	5	373	321	52	10	40
7	Western Force	13	6	1	6	276	282	-6	6	32
8	Hurricanes	13	6	0	7	247	300	-53	3	27
9	Highlanders	13	5	0	8	235	301	-66	7	27
10	Stormers	13	6	0	7	249	326	-77	3	27
11	Cheetahs	13	4	1	8	265	342	-77	4	22
12	Lions	13	5	0	8	175	284	-109	2	22
13	Waratahs	13	3	1	9	266	317	-51	7	21
14	Reds	13	2	0	11	201	438	-237	3	11

Semi-finals
2	Bulls	27
3	Crusaders	12
1	Sharks	34
4	Blues	18

Final
2	Bulls	20
1	Sharks	19

== Match ==
=== First half ===
Two minutes into the first half Bulls' wing Brian Habana tackled Sharks' fullback Percy Montgomery in the air as he fielded a bomb. Montgomery fell on his head and Habana was subsequently penalized by referee Steve Walsh - he was considered lucky not to be issued a yellow card for such a dangerous tackle. After eight minutes Sharks' scrum-half Ruan Pienaar tapped and ran from a penalty breaking the Bulls' line and ending up in the Bulls' 22. From the resulting play the Sharks were awarded penalty after JP Nel infringed at the tackle. The penalty was converted by Montgomery to put them 3–0 up.

When the Bulls were awarded a penalty 45 metres out they elected to kick for touch, and from the resulting lineout the Bulls won possession. After two phases Bulls captain Victor Matfield passed the ball to Pierre Spies who broke through the Sharks line to score a try under the post. The try was converted by Derick Hougaard to give the Bulls a 7–3 lead after 13 minutes. The Sharks responded five minutes later when a pass from Spies was intercepted by Sharks winger JP Pietersen who outran three Bulls defenders to score. Montgomery missed the conversion, and after 19 minutes the Sharks led 8–7.

The next score came after the Sharks counterattacked from their own 22 metre line before Butch James attempted a drop goal. He missed but referee Steve Walsh was playing advantage for accidental off-side, and Montgomery kicked the resulting penalty to give the Sharks an 11–7 lead after 29 minutes. Three minutes later Hougaard kicked a penalty for the Bulls to reduce the Sharks lead to 11–10.

Following a Butch James bomb, the Bulls were penalised for being off-side and Montgomery kicked the penalty to extend the Sharks' lead to 14–10. Prior to half time the Bulls were penalised for collapsing a Sharks' maul, but Montgomery missed the penalty attempt. The Sharks went into the second half leading 14–10.

=== Second half ===
Early in the second half Bulls flyhalf Hougaard attempted a drop goal but was unsuccessful. Then on 43 minutes he attempted a 53metre penalty but the attempt fell short. Soon after Bulls hooker Gary Botha broke through three Sharks defenders and fed the ball to Pedrie Wannenburg, but the Sharks cover defence prevented him scoring when Steyn forced him out at the corner. Sharks lock Albert van den Berg nearly scored in the 56th minute but was tackled out by Hougaard. Following sustained pressure from the Bulls with pick and goes, their centre Wynand Olivier was only prevented from scoring a try due to a James tackle. James was penalised however and Hougaard converted the penalty to narrow the Sharks lead to 14–13 in the 59th minute.

With four minutes remaining Sharks lock Johann Muller won a lineout 25 metres from the Bulls' line. The Sharks then mauled for before it maul collapsed three metres from the Bulls line. After four phases of driving play Van den Berg drove past Danie Rossouw and Derick Kuün to score a try for the Sharks. Steyn then missed the conversion; the Sharks now led 19–13. The Bulls then needed to score a converted try to win the match, and with only a few minutes remaining of regular time they started attacking expansively. In the 79th minute Gary Botha grubber kicked the ball from inside Bulls territory to within the Sharks 22-metre line. François Steyn collected the ball but did not kick out, and instead kicked down field where the ball was collected by Bulls' captain Victor Matfield. The Bulls spread the ball, and went through several phases until it reached winger Bryan Habana near the right touchline. Habana jinked back infield and ran through a gap in the Sharks' defence before scoring a try five metres to right of the goal-posts. The 83rd minute try was then converted by Hougaard to give the Bulls' a 20–19 victory.

== Match details ==
19 May 2007
15:00

Sharks	19–20	Bulls
Tries: Pietersen 18' m van den Berg 77' m Con: Montgomery (0/1), Steyn (0/1); Pen: Montgomery (3)		Tries: Spies 12' c Habana 80+2' c Con: Hougaard (2/2); Pen: Hougaard (2)

Kings Park Stadium, Durban
Attendance: 54,000
Referee: Steve Walsh (New Zealand)

Sharks	Bulls

FB	15	Percy Montgomery
RW	14	François Steyn
OC	13	Waylon Murray
IC	12	Brad Barritt
LW	11	JP Pietersen
FH	10	Butch James
SH	9	Ruan Pienaar
N8	8	Ryan Kankowski
BF	7	AJ Venter
OF	6	Jacques Botes
RL	5	Johann Muller
LL	4	Johan Ackermann
TP	3	BJ Botha
HK	2	John Smit (c)
LP	1	Deon Carstens
Substitutes:
HK	16	Bismarck du Plessis
LP	17	Tendai Mtawarira
RL	18	Albert van den Berg
N8	19	Warren Britz
BL	20	Bob Skinstad
FH	21	Rory Kockott
OC	22	Adrian Jacobs
Coach:
(South Africa) Dick Muir

FB	15	Johan Roets
RW	14	Akona Ndungane
OC	13	JP Nel
IC	12	Wynand Olivier
LW	11	Bryan Habana
FH	10	Derick Hougaard
SH	9	Fourie du Preez
N8	8	Pierre Spies
OF	7	Wikus van Heerden
BF	6	Pedrie Wannenburg
RL	5	Victor Matfield (c)
LL	4	Bakkies Botha
TP	3	Rayno Gerber
HK	2	Gary Botha
LP	1	Gurthro Steenkamp
Substitutions:
HK	16	Jaco Engels
LP	17	Danie Thiart
RL	18	Danie Rossouw
N8	19	Derick Kuün
SH	20	Heinie Adams
FH	21	Morné Steyn
FB	22	Jaco van der Westhuyzen
Coach:
(South Africa) Heyneke Meyer

Man of the Match:
Victor Matfield (Bulls)

Touch judges:
Lyndon Bray (New Zealand)
Bryce Lawrence (New Zealand)
Television match official:
Kelvin Deaker (New Zealand)
Assessor:
Tappe Henning (South Africa)

== See also ==
- 2007 Super 14 season
- Rugby union in South Africa

== Notes ==
Preceded by 2006 Super 14 Final	Super 14 Final; 2007	Succeeded by 2008 Super 14 Final
