= Meyer Bosman =

South African rugby union player

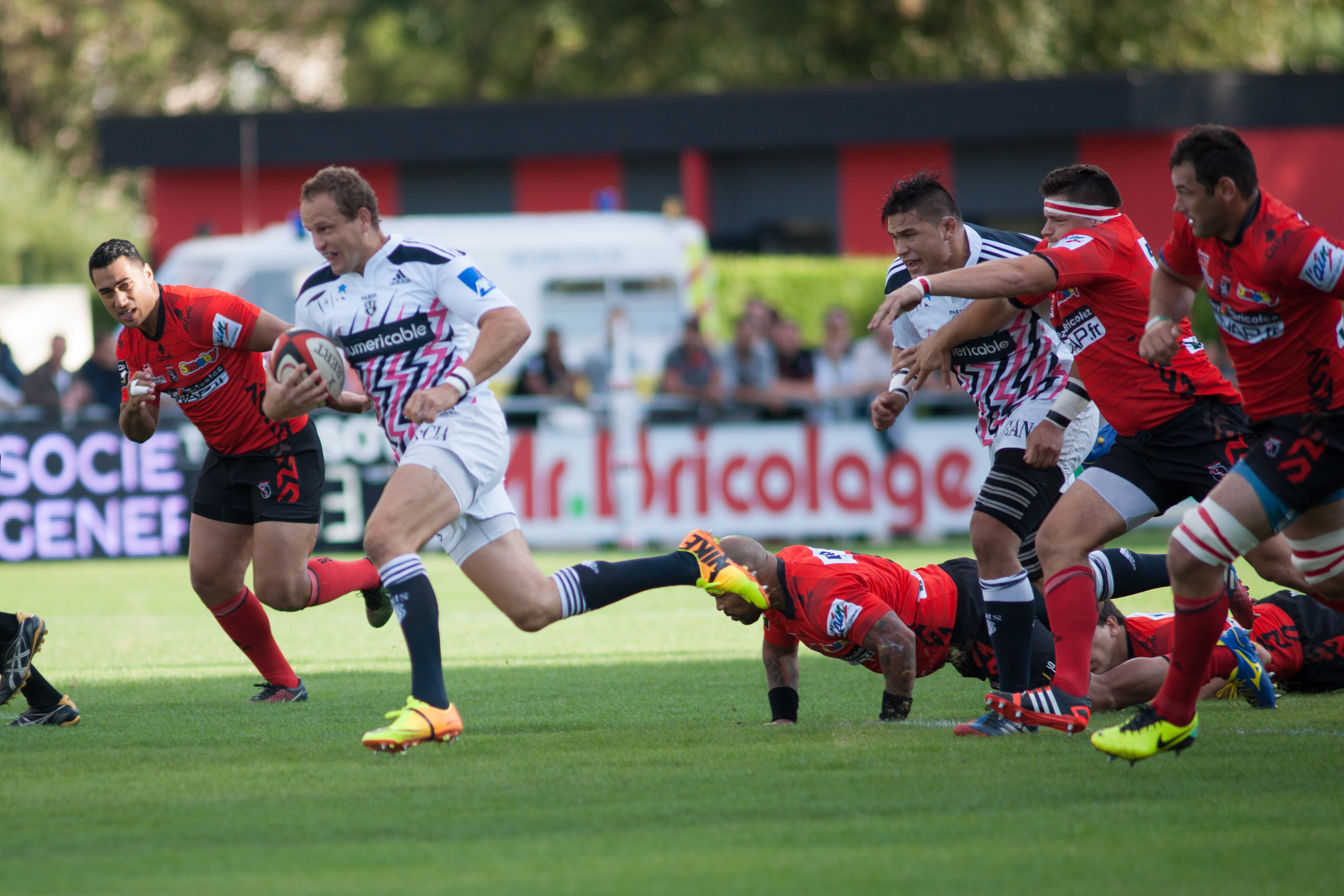
- Born: Herman Meyer Bosman; 19 April 1985 (age 41) Bethlehem, Free State, South Africa
- Height: 1.92 m (6 ft 3 1/2 in)
- Weight: 97 kg (214 lb)

Rugby union career
- Position: Fly-half / Centre
Senior career
Years	Team	Apps	(Points)
2013–17	Stade Français	90	(47)
- Correct as of 19 April 2017
Provincial / State sides
Years	Team	Apps	(Points)
2005–2010	Free State Cheetahs	59	(119)
2011–2012	Sharks (Currie Cup)	23	(132)
- Correct as of 20 June 2014
Super Rugby
Years	Team	Apps	(Points)
2006–2010	Cheetahs	61	(188)
2011–2013	Sharks	47	(57)
- Correct as of 20 June 2014
International career
Years	Team	Apps	(Points)
2005–2006	South Africa	3	(7)
- Correct as of 18 June 2014

Herman Meyer Bosman (born 19 April 1985) is a South African former professional rugby player, who last played for the Stade Français, in France. He is a flyhalf (10), but has recently showed great ability in the inside-center position. He has played for the national team of South Africa, the Springboks on 3 occasions in test matches between 2005 and 2006. He played his last test to date on 15 July 2006 against Australia in Brisbane. Throughout his career, Bosman won three Currie Cup trophies, two outright and drawing another in 2006, also finishing as runner-up twice with the Sharks.

== Rugby career ==
=== Cheetahs / Free State Cheetahs ===
Bosman started his professional rugby career at the Free State Cheetahs in 2005. During his first season, he scored the winning try in the dying moments of the Currie Cup final against the Blue Bulls in Pretoria to earn his side a 29–25 victory. The result meant the Free State Cheetahs won only their second Currie Cup championship, the first being more than 30 years previously.

Bosman was part of the team that successfully defended the title for the following two years, the final ending in a 28–28 draw in 2006 against Blue Bulls and then defeating the Golden Lions 20–18 in the 2007 final.

In 2006 the Cheetahs entered the Super 14 as the new South African franchise. At the time of his departure, Bosman held Cheetahs Super Rugby records for career appearances (61), most career points (188), most points in a Super Rugby match (26) and most penalty goals in a Super Rugby match (8).

=== Springboks ===
At the young age of 20, he made his debut for the Boks in late 2005, against Wales in Cardiff. The Boks won the game 33–16, with Bosman contributed two conversions on his debut. He played the next week against France in Paris, again starting at flyhalf. He kicked one penalty goal in the 20–26 loss. After the Cheetahs' Super 14 season in 2006 ended, Bosman was called up for the Boks for the Tri Nations, and was a reserve in the 0–49 loss in Brisbane against the Wallabies. In 2010, Bosman was an unused substitution in the Springboks 34–31 victory over Wales in Cardiff.

=== Sharks / Sharks ===
At the end of the 2010 Currie Cup season, Bosman signed with the Sharks, the 2010 Currie Cup champions. He made his debut for the Sharks Super Rugby side against his former team, the Cheetahs, in the Super Rugby competition on 19 February 2011 playing at inside centre. The former Sharks inside center, Andries Strauss, played in that match for the Cheetahs, the two players effectively swapping the number 12 jerseys for the two teams. Bosman was a regular starter for the Sharks throughout his career as he helped steer the coastal side to two consecutive Currie Cup finals (in 2011 and 2012) and a Super Rugby qualifier (2011) and final (2012). However, Bosman never managed to win a title with the side.

=== Stade Francais ===
In 2013, Stade Français announced that he was joining them on a two-year contract.

=== Honours ===
- 2005 Currie Cup Premier Division – Free State Cheetahs
- 2006 Currie Cup Premier Division – Free State Cheetahs
- 2007 Currie Cup Premier Division – Free State Cheetahs
