= Gerhard Vosloo =

South African rugby union player

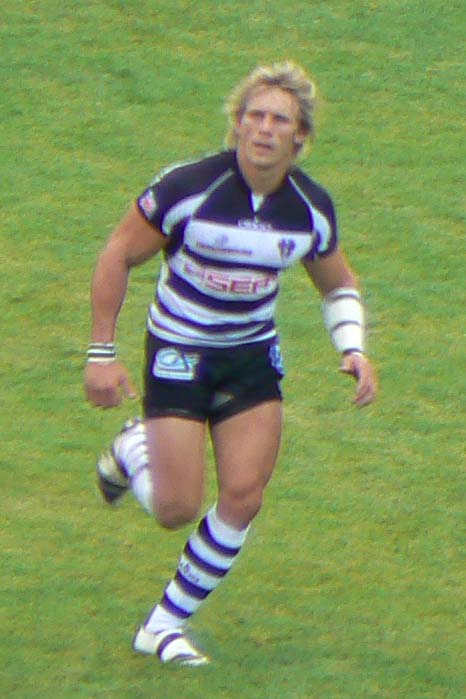
- Born: 10 May 1979 (age 47) Pretoria, South Africa
- Height: 1.88 m (6 ft 2 in)
- Weight: 103 kg (16 st 3 lb)

Rugby union career
- Position: Flanker
Senior career
Years	Team	Apps	(Points)
2006–2008	Castres Olympique	45	(30)
2008–2011	CA Brive	71	(45)
2011–2014	Clermont Auvergne	60	(60)
2014–16	Toulon	15	(0)
- Correct as of 21 December 2019
Provincial / State sides
Years	Team	Apps	(Points)
2002	Blue Bulls 'A'	8	(25)
2003	Pumas	20	(45)
2004–2006	Golden Lions	14	(25)
- Correct as of 8 September 2015
Super Rugby
Years	Team	Apps	(Points)
2004–2006	Cats	15	(10)
- Correct as of 8 September 2015

Gerhard Vosloo (born 10 May 1979) is a South African-French rugby union player. His position is Flanker and he currently plays for Toulon in the Top 14. He began his career with the Lions in his native South Africa before moving to Castres in 2006. He stayed for two seasons before moving to Brive. He was named in the best 15 of the Top 14 in 2009. He transferred to Clermont in 2011. On 17 March 2014, Vosloo signed for Toulon on a one-year contract, option for a further season from the 2014–2015 season.
