= Tiger Mangweni =

South African rugby union player

- Full name: Siyabonga Mangweni
- Born: 20 June 1980 (age 46) Nxaruni, East London
- Height: 1.76 m (5 ft 9 1/2 in)
- Weight: 90 kg (200 lb; 14 st 2 lb)
- School: Ntsonkotha Senior Secondary School

Rugby union career
- Current team: Border Bulldogs
Senior career
Years	Team	Apps	(Points)
2001–2005	Border Bulldogs	63	(203)
2005	Stormers	2	(0)
2005–2007	Griquas	22	(28)
2007	Cheetahs	7	(5)
2008–2010	Bulls	1	(0)
2008–2010	Blue Bulls	46	(78)
2010–2014	Eastern Province Kings	68	(55)
- Correct as of 31 March 2016
International career
Years	Team	Apps	(Points)
2004	South Africa 'A'	2	(0)
2009	Southern Kings	1	(0)
- Correct as of 23 February 2013
Coaching career
- Years: Team
- 2014–2015: Eastern Province Kings (defensive coach)
- 2016–present: Border Bulldogs (defensive coach)

Siyabonga "Tiger" Mangweni (born 20 June 1980) is a South African former rugby union footballer and currently a coach at the Border Bulldogs.

== Playing career ==
He started his career at the Border Bulldogs and got called into the Stormers Super Rugby squad as a Bulldogs player. He then had a short stint at Western Province, before moving to Griquas, where he also represented the Cheetahs in Super Rugby. In 2008, he moved to the Blue Bulls and also played for the Bulls in Super Rugby.

He was part of the Blue Bulls team who won the 2008 Vodacom Cup title against the Lions.

In 2009, he was a member of the Southern Kings team that played in the 2009 British & Irish Lions tour to South Africa.

In 2010, he was released by the Blue Bulls to join the Eastern Province Kings for the 2010 Currie Cup First Division campaign. He was named in the Southern Kings wider training squad for the 2013 Super Rugby season, but was subsequently released to the Vodacom Cup squad.

== Coaching ==
He retired as a player at the end of the 2013 season and was appointed the defensive coach for the EP Kings' Vodacom Cup side.
