= Hendrik Gerber =

South African rugby union player

- Born: Hendrik Jacobus Gerber; 12 April 1976 (age 50) George, Western Cape
- Height: 1.90 m (6 ft 3 in)
- Weight: 105 kg (231 lb)
- School: Nico Malan High School, Humansdorp

Rugby union career
- Position: Flank
Senior career
Years	Team	Apps	(Points)
2006–2007	Brive	14	(5)
Provincial / State sides
Years	Team	Apps	(Points)
1998–2006	Western Province	90	(70)
Super Rugby
Years	Team	Apps	(Points)
1999–2004	Stormers	55	(35)
International career
Years	Team	Apps	(Points)
2003	South Africa	2	
National sevens team
Years	Team		Comps
1998	South Africa 7s		3

Hendrik Jacobus Gerber (born 12 April 1976) is a South African former rugby union player.

== Playing career ==
Gerber matriculated at Nico Malan High School and represented Eastern Province at the annual Craven Week tournaments in 1993 and 1994 and was selected for the 1993 and 1994 South African Schools teams. He made his senior provincial debut for Western Province in 1998.

Gerber toured with the Springboks in 2000 to Argentina, Britain and Ireland and played in four tour matches. In 2003 he made his test match debut for the Springboks against Scotland at Kings Park. He also played in the second test match against Scotland in 2003.

=== Test history ===
No.	Opponents	Results (SA 1st)	Position	Tries	Dates	Venue
1.	Scotland	29–25	Flank		7 Jun 2003	Kings Park, Durban
2.	Scotland	28–19	Flank		14 Jun 2003	Ellis Park, Johannesburg

== See also ==
- List of South Africa national rugby union players – Springbok no. 709
- List of South Africa national rugby sevens players
