= Henno Mentz =

South African rugby union player

Hendrick "Henno" Mentz
- Born: Hendrick Mentz; September 25, 1979 (age 47) Ermelo, Mpumalanga, South Africa
- Height: 1.85 m (6 ft 1 in)
- Weight: 88 kg (194 lb)
- Notable relative: MJ Mentz (brother)

Rugby union career
International career
Years	Team	Apps	(Points)
2004	South Africa		

Hendrik "Henno" Mentz (born 25 September 1979) is a former South African rugby union player who represented the Sharks, Leopards and Lions as well as the South African national team, Springboks at first-class level. Mentz played predominantly on the wing throughout his career. His most notable achievement was his hat trick score against the Reds at Suncorp Stadium in Brisbane for the Lions in 2009, still a franchise record. This was a large contribution to the 31–20 victory that the Lions achieved against the Reds.

In the early days of his Super rugby career, Mentz set the competition (at the time, the Super12) alight, however Mentz followed this with a poor Currie Cup. Mentz's career took a further hit when he suffered a hamstring injury which put him out of contention for the 2005 Sharks Super 12 squad.

Mentz was capped twice by South Africa in 2004. He played against Ireland in Bloemfontein and his second and final test was in Pretoria against Wales. In 2005 Mentz was the ABSA Currie Cups' leading try-scorer crossing the whitewash 13 times for the Sharks.

Mentz's brother, MJ Mentz, is an experienced SA Sevens representative and currently plies his trade with the Pumas. Mentz scored an impressive 72 tries in 149 first-class matches, of which he scored 31 of those in 65 provincial matches for Natal.
