= Ethienne Reynecke =

South African rugby union player

- Full name: Ethienne Reynecke
- Born: 20 March 1982 (age 44) Johannesburg, South Africa
- Height: 1.79 m (5 ft 10 1/2 in)
- Weight: 102 kg (16 st 1 lb; 225 lb)
- School: Hugenote High School, Springs
- University: Rand Afrikaans University

Rugby union career
- Position: Hooker
- Current team: retired
Youth career
- 2000–2002: Golden Lions
Senior career
Years	Team	Apps	(Points)
2003–2004	Golden Lions	1	(0)
2005	Griffons	17	(10)
2003–2009	Golden Lions	53	(15)
2006–2009	Cats / Lions	35	(10)
2009–2011	Saracens F.C.	25	(0)
2011	→ Western Province	2	(0)
2011	→ Stormers	2	(0)
2011–2013	Connacht	44	(15)
2013	Free State Cheetahs	4	(0)
2013–2014	Pau	9	(0)
- Correct as of 8 April 2014

Ethienne Reynecke (born 20 March 1982) is a South African rugby union player. His primary position is hooker.

== Career ==
=== Lions ===
He started his career playing for the Golden Lions and represented them at Under–19, Under–21 and 'A' team level. At the end of 2001, after his second year representing the Under–19 team, he was included in the pre-season training squad for the 2002 Vodacom Cup, following it up with appearances in the 2003 and 2004 seasons. He was also part of the Currie Cup training squad in 2004, playing all the warm-up games.

=== Griffons ===
In 2005, he joined Welkom-based side Griffons for one year, being involved in their Vodacom Cup and Currie Cup campaigns.

=== Return to Lions ===
He returned to the Golden Lions at the end of 2005. He was included in the Cats squad prior to the 2006 Super 14 season before getting injured. He subsequently made three appearances in the 2006 Vodacom Cup side before breaking into Currie Cup side for the first time, making his Currie Cup debut for the Golden Lions in their match against Sharks. and playing in all fourteen matches that season.

In 2007, he was also included in the Lions squad for the 2007 Super 14 season and made his Super Rugby debut in their second match of the season in an 11–6 victory over New Zealand team the Highlanders, and remained a first team regular over the next two seasons. He was also included in a Springbok training squad in 2007.

He wasn't included in the Lions squad for 2009 Super 14, and captained the Vodacom Cup team in the 2009 Vodacom Cup season instead.

=== Saracens ===
In 2009, it was announced that he had joined English Premiership side Saracens, where he played for two seasons.

=== Stormers ===
Shortly before his Saracens contract was due to end, he joined the Stormers on loan for part of the 2011 Super Rugby season as a replacement for injured Tiaan Liebenberg. He made two substitute appearances for them, as well as two appearances for their Vodacom Cup side Western Province in the 2011 Vodacom Cup.

=== Connacht ===
He then joined Irish Pro12 side Connacht on a two-year deal for the 2011–12 season, making 44 appearances in the Heineken Cup and Pro 12 competitions.

=== Free State Cheetahs ===
In July 2013, Free State Cheetahs head coach Naka Drotské confirmed that he had officially signed a contract to join the Free State Cheetahs for the 2013 Currie Cup Premier Division season, making five appearances.

=== Pau ===
He returned to Europe a few months later, joining French Pro D2 side Pau as a medical joker during the 2013–14 Rugby Pro D2 season.

=== Other ===
In addition, Reynecke also played for a World XV against an Asia-Pacific Barbarians side in the 2011 Chartis Cup in Hong Kong in aid of the 2011 Tōhoku earthquake and tsunami disaster. He also played for the South African Barbarians in 2013 against former side Saracens in 2013.

After pro rugby, Reynecke turned his focus to MMA and trained at the WWE Performance Center in Orlando, FL.

In 2018 Reynecke suffered a series of near-death experiences, namely an ischemic stroke, leaving him with the permanent disability Aphasia. Fortunately, he recovered and in 2020 became the South Africa IMMAF light-heavyweight champion.

Reynecke is now a stroke ambassador, raising awareness and supporting survivors.

MMA record
5-0
