= Gus Theron =

South African rugby union player

- Born: Johan Tertius Theron; 10 January 1975 (age 51) Robertson, Western Cape, South Africa
- Height: 1.82 m (5 ft 11 1/2 in)
- Weight: 94 kg (14 st 11 lb)
- School: Robertson High School
- University: University of Stellenbosch

Rugby union career
- Position(s): Wing, centre
Provincial / State sides
Years	Team	Apps	(Points)
1998–2006	Western Province	96	(165)
Super Rugby
Years	Team	Apps	(Points)
1999	Stormers	1	(0)
2001	Sharks	7	(0)
2002–2006	Stormers	33	(30)
International career
Years	Team	Apps	(Points)
2003	South Africa	0	(0)

Johan Tertius "Gus" Theron (born 10 January 1975) is a South African former professional rugby union player. Theron played mainly on the wing and at centre.

== Early life ==
Gus Theron was born in Robertson in the Western Cape Province of South Africa, about 160 km (99 mi) northeast of Cape Town. He attended Robertson Primary School and Robertson Secondary School. After school he attended the University of Stellenbosch. In 1998, 2000 and 2006 he played for Maties, the university's team that competed in the annual club championships.

== Professional career ==
=== 1998–2000 ===
Gus Theron started playing for Western Province in the first season of the Vodacom Cup in 1998. During that same year he made his debut in the Currie Cup for Western Province.

In 1999 and 2000 he again played Vodacom Cup rugby for Western Province, but was also selected for the Stormers squad for the Super 12 competition. After the Super Rugby campaign was completed Theron continued his rugby in Cape Town, playing for Western Province in the Currie Cup. He did not enjoy a lot of game time, with Springboks Breyton Paulse and Pieter Rossouw being the first choice wings for Western Province at the time.

=== 2001 ===
At the start of the 2001 season, Stormers coach, Gert Smal released him to the Sharks in an attempt to gain more game time. He started in three Super 12 games for the Sharks and played in a further four, coming off the replacements bench. After the Super 12 season, he was back in Cape Town to play for Western Province in the Currie Cup.

=== 2002–2003 ===
In 2002 and 2003, Theron was again part of the Western Province Vodacom Cup squad. In 2002 he also made a return to the Stormer's Super Rugby squad and formed part of Western Province's Currie Cup squad later in the year. In 2003 Springbok coach Rudolf Straeuli selected Theron in the 28-man Springbok squad for the away leg of the 2003 Tri Nations Series. This was a controversial selection as Theron did not have a particularly good Super 12 campaign. He was due to make his Springbok debut against Australia on 2 August 2003 at Suncorp Stadium in Brisbane. Unfortunately he had to withdraw from the game due to a hamstring injury and was never again selected for the Springboks.

=== 2004–2006 ===
From 2004 to 2006 Theron was a regular in Western Province's Vodacom Cup and Currie Cup squads. He also featured in a number of Super Rugby games for the Stormers. In total, Theron played 130 games for the Stormers and Western Province.
