= Ockie van Zyl =

South African rugby union player

- Full name: Ockert Petrus van Zyl
- Born: 17 August 1982 (age 44) Bloemfontein, South Africa
- Height: 1.97 m (6 ft 5 1/2 in)
- Weight: 112 kg (17 st 9 lb; 247 lb)
- School: Hoërskool Fichardtpark
- University: Central University of Technology
- Notable relative: Ockie van Zyl (nephew)

Rugby union career
- Position: Flanker / Lock
Youth career
- 2000: SWD U19
Senior career
Years	Team	Apps	(Points)
2004–2006	Griffons	37	(50)
2006	Cheetahs	8	(0)
2006–2007	Racing Métro 92	16	(0)
2007	Griquas	10	(0)
2008–2009	Griffons	14	(5)
2011	Free State Cheetahs	1	(0)
2012–2013	Free State XV	9	(10)
- Correct as of 1 September 2016
- Correct as of 1 September 2016

Ockert Petrus van Zyl (born 17 August 1982) is a former South African rugby union player, that played first class rugby between 2004 and 2013. He played as a flanker or a lock.

== Rugby career ==
Van Zyl was born in Bloemfontein and spent the bulk of his career playing for Free State-based sides the Griffons and the Free State Cheetahs. He also made eight appearances in the Super 14 competition for the Cheetahs, and had short spells at French side Racing Métro 92 and with the Kimberley-based Griquas.

== Personal life ==
Van Zyl's nephew – also called Ockie – also played professional rugby for the Griffons and Boland Cavaliers.
