= Chris Rossouw (rugby union, born 1976) =

South African rugby union player (born 1976)

Chris Rossouw is a South African rugby union player, born 14 November 1976 in Bellville (South Africa). He has played for the South Africa national rugby union team and plays as fly half for the Free State Cheetahs (1.87 m and 92 kg). He is the brother of ex-Springbok wing and current backline coach of the Bulls, Pieter Rossouw.

== Career ==
=== Club ===
- 2005 - 2008 : RC Toulonnais (France)

=== Province ===
- 1997-2005 : Western Province (1997- under 21, 1998 and 1999- reserves, played in Currie Cup) (South Africa)
- Since 2008 : Free State Cheetahs (South Africa)

=== Franchise ===
- 2001-2005 : Stormers (Super 12) (South Africa)

== Honours ==
=== Club ===
- Rugby Pro D2 : 2008

=== Province ===
- Winner of Currie Cup : 2000, 2001 with Western Province

=== National team ===
- 5 caps for South Africa national rugby union team
