= Michael Coetzee =

South African activist

- Born: 25 August 1959; Loerie, Eastern Cape
- Died: 13 June 2014 (aged 54); Cape Town
- Occupations: Trade Union leader, Civil Servant
- Known for: Anti-apartheid activism
- Political party: African National Congress

Michael Coetzee (25 August 1959 – 13 June 2014) was a South African activist, trade union leader and secretary of Parliament of South Africa.

== Anti-apartheid activism ==
Coetzee was influenced by both the Black Consciousness Movement whilst he was in high school Uitenhage and the politically charged atmosphere of the University of the Western Cape in the late 1970s and early 1980s.

Coetzee was recruited into the then banned African National Congress in 1981 and went underground. In 1983 he was arrested by the apartheid government for his involvement in the ANC after documentation with his details were found during a raid led by the South African Defence Force into Lesotho.

He was arrested in 1983 after information linking him to the banned organisation was found during a raid by the SADF in Lesotho, where some of the ANC's underground structures were based. He was then charged with perjury for refusing to testify against other ANC members and spent a year in Allandale Prison.

After prison, Coetzee worked for the Chemical Workers Industrial Union in East London where he assisted in the formation of South Africa's largest trade union COSATU.

Coetzee was regarded as an important political organiser within the ANC and against apartheid.

== Political career ==
Following South Africa's first democratic elections in 1994 he became secretary to the Gauteng Provincial Legislature. Eight years later in 2002 he was appointed deputy secretary of the Parliament of South Africa and was promoted to secretary in 2012.

== Death ==
Coetzee died of cancer on 13 June 2014.
