= Duimpie Theron =

Namibian rugby union player

- Born: Johannes Petrus Theron; 7 May 1979 (age 47) Bloemfontein, Free State, South Africa
- Height: 1.96 m (6 ft 5 in)
- Weight: 113 kg (249 lb)
- School: Windhoek Technical High School

Rugby union career
- Position: Lock
Provincial / State sides
Years	Team	Apps	(Points)
2001	Blue Bulls	1	(0)
2002–2005	Griquas	50	(55)
2006	Western Province	7	(0)
International career
Years	Team	Apps	(Points)
1998–2004	Namibia	8	(0)

Johannes Petrus "Duimpie" Theron (born 7 May 1979) is a South African-born rugby union player who played for the Namibia national rugby union team and represented Namibia during the 1999 Rugby World Cup.

== Playing career ==
Theron played eight test matches for Namibia. His debut was in 1998, as a nineteen-year-old, in the Rugby World Cup qualifier against Ivory Coast in Casablanca. Theron played in three matches during the pool stages at the 1999 Rugby World Cup. Shortly after the World Cup, he also played in a test match against Germany, after which his next and final test was only five years later in 2004, against Morocco.

=== Test history ===
No.	Opponents	Results (Nam 1st)	Position	Tries	Dates	Venue
1.	Ivory Coast	22–10	Lock		12 Sep 1998	COC Stadium, Casablanca
2.	Morocco	17–8	Lock		16 Sep 1998	COC Stadium, Casablanca
3.	Zimbabwe	39–14	Lock		19 Sep 1998	COC Stadium, Casablanca
4.	Fiji	18–67	Substitute		1 Oct 1999	Stade de la Méditerranée, Béziers
5.	France	13–47	Substitute		8 Oct 1999	Parc Lescure, Bordeaux
6.	Canada	11–72	Substitute		14 Oct 1999	Stadium de Toulouse, Toulouse
7.	Germany	79–13	Lock		17 Oct 1999	Gera
8.	Morocco	39–22	Lock		13 Nov 2004	South West Stadium, Windhoek
