= Piet Krause =

South African rugby union player

- Born: Petrus Johannes Krause; July 13, 1973 (age 53) Pretoria, South Africa
- Height: 1.84 m (6 ft 0 in)
- Weight: 104 kg (229 lb)
- School: HTS Sasolburg

Rugby union career
- Position: Flanker
Provincial / State sides
Years	Team	Apps	(Points)
1996–1997	Golden Lions	1	(5)
1998–1999	Griqualand West	1	(5)
2002–2003	Leopards	1	(5)
2003–2004	Blue Bulls	1	(5)
2005–2007	Falcons		
Super Rugby
Years	Team	Apps	(Points)
1999–2002	Cats		
2003–2004	Bulls		

Petrus Johannes (Piet) Krause (born 13 July 1973 in Pretoria, South Africa) is a former South African rugby union footballer who is currently serving as an assistant coach for the Falcons in the Currie Cup competition.

Piet got married in 1996 to his wife Elsabe Susan Krause and has three sons, Brandon Krause, Phillip Krause and Gustave Krause. He is currently expecting his first grandson, Muller Krause from his oldest son (Brandon) and his wife Michellene Krause.

== Career ==
Krause played in the position of flanker and was renowned for his speed to the breakdown, his courage in the tackle and his durability. He was the first Vaal Triangle Craven Week player to be selected for the South African Schools team in 1991 before making his provincial debut with the Golden Lions in 1996. Krause moved to the Griquas in 1998 after failing to win a regular starting spot, but returned to the Lions in 2000. He played for the Emerging Springboks against Wales in 1998 as part of a loose trio that featured Andre Vos and AJ Venter.

Krause made his Super 12 debut with the Cats in 1999 and played with them for four seasons before switching to the Bulls in 2003. He finished his playing career with the Falcons, where he served as captain from 2006 to 2007.
