= Heini Adams =

South African rugby union player

- Born: Heinrich Jaco Adams; 29 May 1980 (age 46) Worcester, South Africa, South Africa
- Height: 1.65 m (5 ft 5 in)
- Weight: 78 kg (12 st 4 lb)
- School: Esselen Park Senior Secondary School, Worcester, South Africa
- Occupation: Professional rugby union footballer

Rugby union career
- Position: Scrum-half
Senior career
Years	Team	Apps	(Points)
2010–2016	Bordeaux	60	(45)
- Correct as of 23 November 2012
Provincial / State sides
Years	Team	Apps	(Points)
2003–2004	Eagles		
2005–2010	Blue Bulls	43	(25)
- Correct as of 23 November 2012
Super Rugby
Years	Team	Apps	(Points)
2005–2010	Bulls	35	(18)
- Correct as of 23 November 2012
International career
Years	Team	Apps	(Points)
2009	South Africa	2	(0)

Heini Adams (born 29 May 1980 in Worcester, South Africa) is a professional rugby union player. He currently plays for Union Bordeaux Begles in the Top 14. His first tour with the Springboks was to France, Italy, Ireland and England in the 2009 end of year rugby tests. Before moving to France, Adams played for the South African Super Rugby side the Blue Bulls. He plays at scrum-half. He is known for his anticipation in defence and quick distribution of the ball from behind the scrum.

From June 2010 until 2015, he joined Bordeaux in France, ending his international career. In 2017 he joined the coaching staff of the French Barbarians to play South African A.

== Honours ==
Blue Bulls

- Currie Cup: 2006 (shared), 2009

Bulls

- Super Rugby: 2009
