= Rudi Keil =

South African rugby union player

- Born: 8 December 1977 (age 47); Johannesburg, South Africa
- Height: 1.85 m (6 ft 1 in)
- Weight: 95 kg (14 st 13 lb)

Rugby union career
- Position(s): centre
Senior career
Years	Team	Apps	(Points)
2000–2006	Sharks (rugby union)		()
2006–2007	Gloucester		()
2007–2009	Sale Sharks	34	(15)
2009–2010	Nice		()
2010	Eastern Province Kings		()

Rudi Keil (born 8 December 1977, in Johannesburg, South Africa) is a rugby union centre.

Keil moved to Sale from Gloucester. One of Keil's best performances for Gloucester was when he scored 2 tries against Saracens on 4 November 2006. He signed with French club Nice in 2011. He is also now eligible to play for the United States national rugby union team.

- Guinness Premiership Rugby - 4 years
- Experience in Heineken Cup, Guinness Premiership, EDF
- South Africa Under-21/Under-23
- Super 12/Super 14 South Africa –Promising Player of the year 03
- Currie Cup Champions
