= Anton Leonard =

South Africa international rugby union player

- Born: 31 May 1974 (age 52) Durban, South Africa
- Height: 6 ft 3 in (1.91 m)
- Weight: 238 lb (108 kg)

Rugby union career
- Position: Number 8
Senior career
Years	Team	Apps	(Points)
1997-1999	SWD Eagles		
2000-2008	Blue Bulls		
Super Rugby
Years	Team	Apps	(Points)
1997-1999	Stormers		
2000-2008	Bulls	72	(30)
International career
Years	Team	Apps	(Points)
1999	South Africa	2	(5)
Coaching career
- Years: Team
- 2010 (forwards coach): Griquas

Anton Leonard (born 31 May 1974 in Durban) is a South African former rugby union player and current coach. He played as a number 8.

== Career ==
Playing for the Stormers, he was called up relatively late in the Springboks (25 years): he was called eventually by the coach Nick Mallett for the 1999 Rugby World Cup South African roster where Leonard played two matches, his only two international caps, arriving third at the tournament.

Playing for the Bulls, he first retired in 2005; returning in late 2006, he won the 2007 Super 14 season and retired the next year. As coach, by late 2010 he became forwards coach for the Currie Cup team Griqualand West Griquas.

== Trophies ==
Super Rugby Bulls: 2007
