= MJ Mentz =

South African rugby union player

- Full name: Marthinus Johannes Mentz
- Born: 21 July 1982 (age 44) Ermelo, South Africa
- Height: 1.78 m (5 ft 10 in)
- Weight: 85 kg (187 lb; 13 st 5 lb)
- School: Hoërskool Ermelo
- University: North-West University, Potchefstroom

Rugby union career
- Position: Winger / Fullback / Fly-half
Youth career
- 2002: Leopards
Senior career
Years	Team	Apps	(Points)
2002–2004	Leopards	27	(45)
2005–2008	Griquas	66	(140)
2009–2012	Pumas	38	(40)
- Correct as of 28 October 2015
International career
Years	Team	Apps	(Points)
1998	South Africa U16		
2000	South Africa U18		
2003	South Africa U21		
- Correct as of 28 October 2015
National sevens team
Years	Team		Comps
2007–2010	South Africa Sevens		18
Coaching career
- Years: Team
- 2013–2014: Pumas (assistant)
- 2015–2016: Pumas (head coach)
- 2017–present: Pumas (backline coach)
Medal record
Men's rugby sevens
Representing South Africa
Commonwealth Games
Bronze medal – third place	2010 Delhi	Team competition

Marthinus Johannes "M.J." Mentz (born 21 July 1982, Ermelo, South Africa) is a former South African rugby union player and currently the backline coach of Currie Cup side the Pumas. He regularly played as a winger or a fullback.

== Career ==
He played for the Leopards, Griquas and Pumas in domestic South African rugby during his playing career which spanned 2002 to 2012. He also represented South Africa at Under-16, Under-18 and Under-21 level and represented the South African Sevens in 18 tournaments between 2006 and 2011, including the 2010 Commonwealth Games in India where his team won the bronze medal.

He wrapped up his playing career at the Pumas, retiring after the 2012 season. The Pumas appointed him as a coach and assistant to head coach Jimmy Stonehouse. When Stonehouse left to join Japanese Top League side Toshiba Brave Lupus at the start of 2015, Mentz was named as his successor. He guided the Pumas to their first ever Vodacom Cup title in 2015, beating Western Province 24–7 in the final, and to sixth position in the 2015 Currie Cup Premier Division.

On 2 November 2015, the Pumas announced that Mentz was reappointed as head coach until the end of 2017.
