= Johan Wasserman =

South African rugby union player

- Born: 29 July 1977 (age 49) Ermelo, South Africa
- Height: 187 cm (6 ft 2 in)
- Weight: 104 kg (229 lb)

Rugby union career
- Position: Flanker
International career
Years	Team	Apps	(Points)
2000	South Africa		

Johan Wasserman (born 29 July 1977) is a South African former professional rugby union player.

A flanker from Ermelo, Wasserman was on the 2000 tour of Argentina, Britain and Ireland with the Springboks. He played in uncapped matches and scored his first Springboks try in the win over Wales A in Cardiff.

Wasserman, who won two Currie Cup titles with the Blue Bulls, relocated to France in 2007 to play for Montpellier.

== See also ==
- List of South Africa national rugby union players
