= Gary Botha =

South Africa dual-code international rugby player

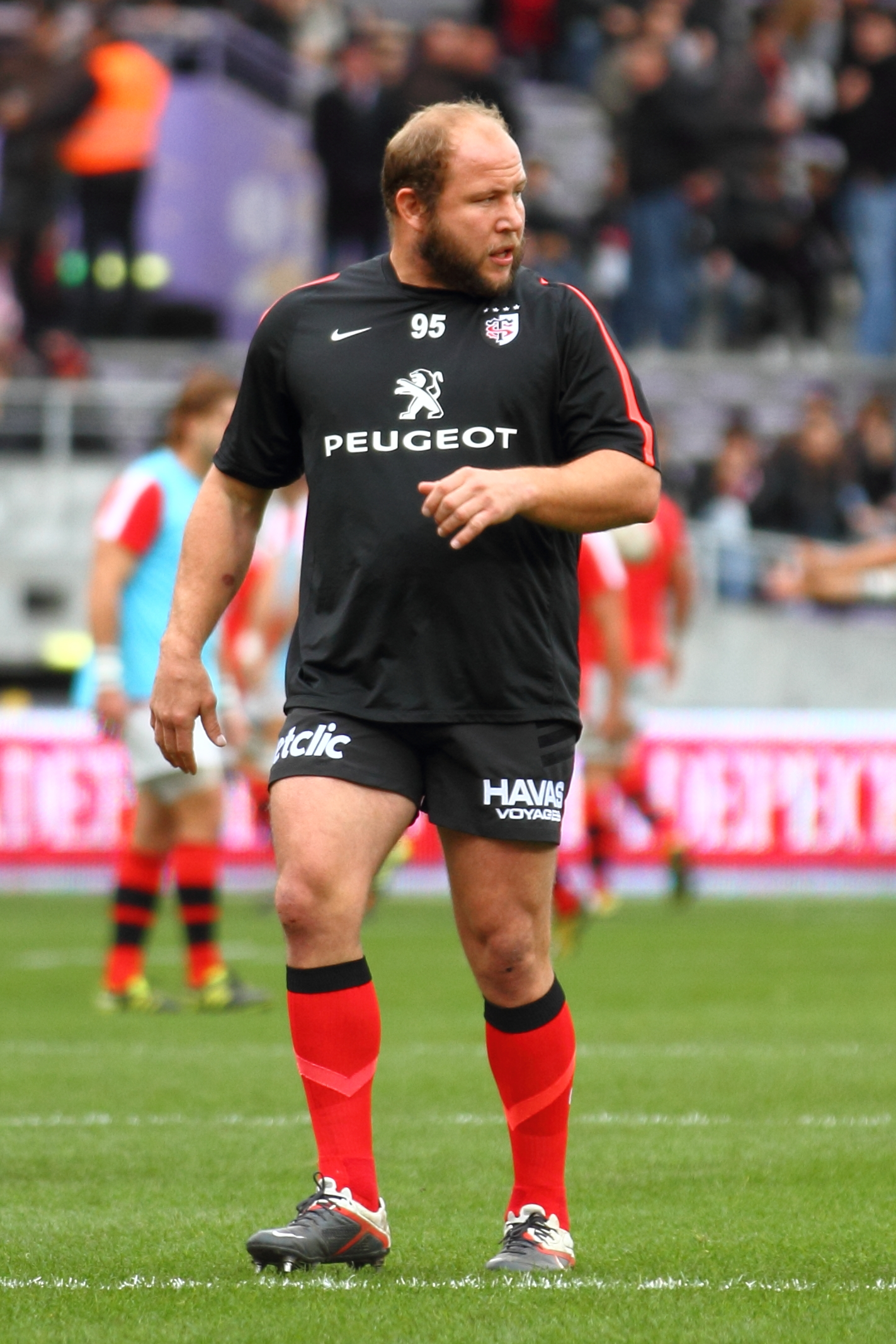
- Full name: Gary van Ginkel Botha
- Born: 12 October 1981 (age 45) Pretoria, South Africa
- Height: 1.80 m (5 ft 11 in)
- Weight: 106 kg (16 st 10 lb; 234 lb)
- School: Hoërskool Waterkloof

Rugby union career
- Position: Hooker
Senior career
| Years | Team | Apps | (Points) |
| 2002–2006 | Blue Bulls | | |
| 2003 | Sharks | 10 | (5) |
| 2004–2007 | Bulls | 49 | (25) |
| 2007–2009 | Harlequins | 40 | (25) |
| 2009–2011 | Bulls | 28 | (15) |
| 2009–2011 | Blue Bulls | 21 | (5) |
| 2011–2013 | Toulouse | 24 | (10) |
- Correct as of 1 July 2015
International career
| Years | Team | Apps | (Points) |
| 2005–2007 | South Africa | 16 | (0) |
- Correct as of 1 July 2015
- Rugby league career

Playing information
Representative
| Years | Team | Pld | T | G | FG | P |
|---|---|---|---|---|---|---|
| 2000 | South Africa |

Gary van Ginkel Botha (born 12 October 1981 in Pretoria, South Africa) is a former rugby union player, that professionally played as a hooker between 2002 and 2013. He spent the majority of his career at his home-town team the Blue Bulls and their affiliated Super Rugby team the Bulls, but he also had spells at the Sharks, at English side Harlequins and at French Top 14 side Toulouse. He also played in 12 test matches for South Africa from 2005 to 2007.

In 2015, he was appointed as a technical consultant for the Blue Bulls forwards.

Botha has won the Currie Cup with the Blue Bulls, the Super 14 title with the Bulls and was part of the Springbok squad that won the 2007 Rugby World Cup.

Botha made his debut for the Springboks in 2005, in a match against Australia at the Loftus Versfeld Stadium in Pretoria, replacing captain John Smit.

Botha has played rugby league for the South African Rhinos at the age of 18.

== Honours ==
South Africa Under-21

- World Cup: 2002

Blue Bulls

- Currie Cup: 2002, 2003, 2004, 2006 (Shared Blue Bulls/Free State Cheetahs)

Bulls

- Super Rugby: 2007, 2010

South Africa

- World Cup: 2007
