= Deon Carstens =

South African rugby union player

- Full name: Pieter-Deon Carstens
- Born: 3 June 1979 (age 47) Goodwood, Cape Town, South Africa
- Height: 1.84 m (6 ft 1/2 in)
- Weight: 116 kg (18 st 4 lb; 256 lb)
- School: Boland Agricultural High School

Rugby union career
- Position: Prop
Senior career
Years	Team	Apps	(Points)
2001–2009	Sharks (Currie Cup)	94	(50)
2001–2010	Sharks	84	(20)
2010–2011	Saracens	19	(5)
2012	Western Province	13	(0)
2012	Stormers	5	(0)
- Correct as of 14 April 2013
International career
Years	Team	Apps	(Points)
1998	South Africa Under-19		
2000	South Africa Under-21		
2002–2009	South Africa	10	(0)
- Correct as of 14 April 2013

Deon Carstens (born 3 June 1979) is a former South African rugby union footballer. He played rugby for the Sharks and Stormers in Super Rugby and for Sharks and Western Province in the Currie Cup and Vodacom Cup competitions. He also played for Saracens in the English Premiership.

Carstens announced his retirement in 2013 after an ongoing back injury.

== Career ==
Carstens attended Franschoek Primary and Boland High School and represented the South African Under-19 side in 1998 at tight head prop. Carstens made his senior provincial and Super rugby debut in 2001 for the Sharks. He was selected to tour Europe with the South African national side in 2002 and made his test debut on that tour, against Scotland on 16 November 2002. Scotland won the match by a record score of 21 points to 6. He is a versatile player who can cover either side of the front row. In April 2010 it was announced that Carstens had agreed to join the Saracens FC for the 2010–11 season. In November 2011, it was announced that he returned to South Africa to join the Stormers for the 2012 Super Rugby season. Carstens has won the Currie Cup 3 times, twice with Natal (2008 & 2010) and once with Western Province (2012). He was also part of the Saracens squad that won the 2010–11 English Premiership.
