= JP Nel =

South Africa international rugby league & union player

- Full name: Jacobus Paulus Nel
- Born: 9 January 1981 (age 45) Worcester, South Africa
- Height: 1.84 m (6 ft 1/2 in)
- Weight: 94 kg (14 st 11 lb; 207 lb)
- School: Worcester Gymnasium
- University: Tygerberg College

Rugby union career
- Position: Outside Centre
Youth career
- 1999–2000: Western Province
- 2002: Blue Bulls
Senior career
Years	Team	Apps	(Points)
2000	Western Province	1	(0)
2001–2007	Blue Bulls	78	(197)
2001–2009	Bulls	78	(75)
2010–2012	NTT Communications Shining Arcs	19	(45)
2012–2013	Griquas	12	(0)
- Correct as of 1 November 2013
International career
Years	Team	Apps	(Points)
2002	South Africa Under-21		
- Correct as of 1 November 2013
Coaching career
- Years: Team
- 2017–2018: Welwitschias (Backline Coach)
- 2019–: Strela (Head Coach)
- Correct as of 10 May 2019

Jacobus Paulus (JP) Nel (born 9 January 1981) is a former South African rugby union footballer, who regularly played as a centre. He made his first class debut for Western Province in 2000 and made almost two hundred first class appearances between 2000 and 2013. He played for the Blue Bulls in the domestic Currie Cup and Vodacom Cup competitions and for the Bulls in Super Rugby between 2001 and 2009 and had two seasons at NTT Communications Shining Arcs in the Japanese Top League and a further two seasons for Griquas in the Currie Cup.

He retired after the 2013 Currie Cup season, never having been selected for the Springboks.
