= Derick Hougaard =

South African rugby union player

- Born: 4 January 1983 (age 43) Citrusdal, South Africa
- Height: 1.75 m (5 ft 9 in)
- Weight: 85 kg (13 st 5 lb)
- Occupation: Professional rugby union footballer

Rugby union career
- Position: Flyhalf
Senior career
Years	Team	Apps	(Points)
2008–2009	Leicester Tigers	13	(98)
2009–2012	Saracens	33	(269)
Provincial / State sides
Years	Team	Apps	(Points)
2002–2008	Blue Bulls	68	(712)
- Correct as of 7 August 2006
Super Rugby
Years	Team	Apps	(Points)
2003–2008	Bulls	43	(478)
- Correct as of 8 June 2007
International career
Years	Team	Apps	(Points)
2003–2007	South Africa	8	(69)
- Correct as of 16 August 2007

Derick Hougaard (born 4 January 1983), more commonly known as the 'Liefling van Loftus' is a South African professional rugby union player who played for Leicester Tigers and Saracens in England. He normally played at flyhalf. Hougaard played for the Blue Bulls in the Currie Cup competition in South Africa and the Bulls in the international Super Rugby competition.

In the 2002 Currie Cup final against the Golden Lions, Hougaard broke Naas Botha's 15 year record for points scored in a Currie Cup final of 24 by scoring 26, (1 try, 2 drop goals and 5 penalties). This feat at the start of his career and his excellent goal kicking success ratio during the following years earned him the accolade "Liefling van Loftus", an Afrikaans phrase meaning the "sweetheart of Loftus Versfeld Stadium" in Pretoria. Each time Hougaard scored points for the Bulls at Loftus, the chorus of a Gé Korsten song named "Liefling" was played in the stadium.

Hougaard made his test debut at the age of 20 for the Springboks during the 2003 World Cup as a reserve during the 72 to 6 win over Uruguay at Subiaco Oval in Perth, he also scored his first international points, successful in a conversion. After resuming his role as a reserve in the next match against England, Hougaard was promoted to flyhalf for the remaining three games that South Africa played at the World Cup. At the close of the World Cup, Hougaard, with five caps to his name had produced 48 points, including two tries. In the 2003 world cup match against Samoa, Hougaard was knocked out by a legal but hard tackle from Brian Lima.

The 2007 Super 14 semi-final saw Hougaard scoring all of his side's 27 points, by means of 8 penalties and a drop goal, against the Canterbury Crusaders at Loftus Versfeld in Pretoria. This equalled Adrian Cashmore of the Auckland Blues's 1998 record for most points by an individual in a Super Rugby semi-final. This victory was historic since it set up the first ever Super Rugby final between two South African teams. The 2007 Super 14 season was also a personal best in Hougaard's Super Rugby career, having scored 161 points in 14 matches.

In 2008, Hougaard signed for Leicester Tigers rejoining previous Blue Bulls coach Heyneke Meyer as a replacement for Andy Goode who had moved to CA Brive. He made his début against Bath in October 2008.

In 2009, Hougaard signed for Saracens.

== Personal life ==
In 2013, he married the singer, Karlien van Jaarsveld. The following year, he played her love interest in the music video for her single, "Ek wil nie kwaad gaan slaap nie". They divorced in 2016. They have two sons together, Eliah and Daniel.

=== Health ===
In June 2023, Hougaard was hospitalised in a coma after experiencing inflammation of the lungs.
