= 2001 Currie Cup =

Domestic rugby union competition

- Countries: South Africa
- Date: 4 July – 27 October 2001
- Champions: Western Province (31st title)
- Runners-up: Sharks
- Matches played: 73

The 2001 Currie Cup was the 63rd season of the Currie Cup, South Africa's premier domestic rugby union competition, since it started in 1889. The competition was known as the Bankfin Currie Cup for sponsorship reasons and was contested from 4 July to 25 October 2001.

The top eight sides from an initial qualification stage competed for the premier Currie Cup, while the bottom six sides from the qualification stage competed for the secondary Bankfin Cup. The Currie Cup was won by Western Province for the 31st time in their history; they beat the Sharks 29–24 in the final played on 25 October 2001. The Bankfin Cup was won by the Boland Cavaliers for the first time; they beat the Leopards 41–27 in the final played on 17 October 2001.

The Currie Cup was broadcast by pay TV channels, SuperSport and M-Net on the DStv satellite TV platform.

== Competition rules and information ==
There were fourteen participating teams in the 2001 Currie Cup, all of them starting the season in the 2001 Currie Cup qualification stage. At this stage, the teams were divided into two sections (Section X and Section Y) and played all the other teams in their section once, either home or away.

The top four teams from both sections qualified to the 2001 Currie Cup Top 8 stage, carrying forward the results they got against their three fellow qualifiers. In the Top 8, they then faced all the teams from the opposite section once, either home and away.

The bottom three teams from both qualification sections qualified to the 2001 Bankfin Cup stage, carrying forward the results they got against their two fellow qualifiers. In the Bankfin Cup, they then faced all the teams from the opposite section once, either home and away.

In all three stages of the competition, teams received four points for a win and two points for a draw. Bonus points were awarded to teams that scored four or more tries in a game, as well as to teams that lost a match by seven points or less. Teams were ranked by log points, then points difference (points scored less points conceded).

At the end of the Top 8 and Bankfin Cup stages, the top four teams qualified for the title play-offs. In the semi-finals, the team that finished first had home advantage against the team that finished fourth, while the team that finished second had home advantage against the team that finished third. The winners of these semi-finals advanced to the final, at the home venue of the higher-placed team.

== Teams ==
Location of teams in the 2001 Currie Cup

=== Team Listing ===
2001 Currie Cup teams
Team	Sponsored Name	Stadium/s	Sponsored Name
Blue Bulls	Blue Bulls	Loftus Versfeld, Pretoria	Minolta Loftus
Boland Cavaliers	Boland Cavaliers	Boland Stadium, Wellington	Boland Stadium
Border Bulldogs	Spoornet Bulldogs	Waverley Park, East London	ABSA Stadium
Falcons	Falcons	Barnard Stadium, Kempton Park	Barnard Stadium
Free State Cheetahs	Vodacom Free State Cheetahs	Free State Stadium, Bloemfontein	Vodacom Park
Golden Lions	Golden Lions	Ellis Park Stadium, Johannesburg	Ellis Park Stadium
Griffons	Griffons	North West Stadium, Welkom	North West Stadium
Griquas	Nashua Griquas	Griqua Park, Kimberley	ABSA Park
Leopards	Leopards	Olën Park, Potchefstroom	Olën Park
Mighty Elephants	Mighty Elephants	PE Stadium, Port Elizabeth	PE Stadium
Mpumalanga Pumas	Mpumalanga Pumas	Johann van Riebeeck Stadium, Witbank	@lantic Park
Sharks	Natal Sharks	University of Natal, Durban	University of Natal
SWD Eagles	Vodacom Eagles	Outeniqua Park, George	Outeniqua Park
Western Province	Fedsure Western Province	Newlands Stadium, Cape Town	Fedsure Park Newlands

== Qualification ==
The Falcons, Free State Cheetahs, Golden Lions and Sharks qualified for the Top 8 stage after finishing in the top four teams in Section X, while the Blue Bulls, Griquas, Pumas and Western Province qualified for the Top 8 stage after finishing in the top four teams in Section Y.

The Boland Cavaliers, Griffons and Mighty Elephants qualified for the Bankfin Cup after finishing in the bottom three in Section X, while the Border Bulldogs, Leopards and SWD Eagles qualified for the Bankfin Cup after finishing in the bottom three in Section Y.

== Top 8 ==
The Free State Cheetahs, Golden Lions, Sharks and Western Province finished in the top four of the Top 8 stage to qualify for the semi-finals. After winning their respective semi-finals, the Natal Sharks and Western Province played in the final, which Western Province won 29–24 in Cape Town.

== Bankfin Cup ==
The Boland Cavaliers, Border Bulldogs, Leopards and Mighty Elephants finished in the top four of the Bankfin Cup stage to qualify for the semi-finals. After winning their respective semi-finals, the Boland Cavaliers and Leopards played in the final, which the Boland Cavaliers won 41–27 in Wellington.

== Honours ==
The honour roll for the 2001 Currie Cup was:

2001 Currie Cup honours
Currie Cup champions:	Western Province (31st title)
Bankfin Cup champions:	Boland Cavaliers (1st title)
