= 2026 SA Rugby Under-23 Cup =

Domestic rugby union competition

- Date: 21 March – 16 May 2026
- Champions: Bulls
- Runners-up: Lions

The 2026 SA Rugby Under-23 Cup was the first edition of the SA Rugby Under-23 Cup, created for junior player development and senior players returning from injury or who need game time as well as Currie Cup preparation.

The first edition final of this tournament was contested by a "Jukskei Derby" between the Lions and Bulls in Johannesburg and the Bulls won 33 to 32.

== Teams ==
SA Rugby Under-23 Cup teams
Team	Sponsored name
Bulls	Vodacom Bulls XV
Lions	Lions XV
Sharks	Hollywoodbets Sharks U23
Stormers	DHL Stormers XXIII

== Standings ==
2026 SA Cup standings
Pos	Team	Pld	W	D	L	PF	PA	PD	TF	TA	B	Pts	Qualification	LIO	BUL	STO	SHA
1	Lions XV	5	5	0	0	181	103	+78	28	15	5	25	Final	—	49–31	8 May	57–26
2	Bulls	5	2	0	3	176	140	+36	26	21	5	13	Final	24–27	—	68–26	9 May
3	Stormers	5	2	0	3	120	145	−25	19	22	2	10		15–24	17–36	—	41–7
4	Sharks	5	1	0	4	71	160	−89	11	26	1	5		7–24	21–17	10–21	—

Updated to match(es) played on 2 May 2026. Source: SARU
- Green background (rows 1 to 2) indicates qualification to the 2026 SA Rugby Under-23 Cup final.
- Plain background (row 3–4) indicates other teams failed to qualified for the 2026 SA Rugby Under-23 Cup final.

Source = springboks.rugby

== Fixtures and results ==
=== Round 1 ===
21 March 2026	Sharks	7–24	Lions XV	Kings Park Stadium, Durban
	Try: Ceano Everson; Con: Pieter Bergh	Report	Try: Keagan Smith (2); Marno Grobbelaar; Michail Damon; Con: Sam Francis (2)	Referee: Caleb Hibbers

=== Round 2 ===
27 March 2026	Bulls	24–27	Lions XV	Old Peter Mokaba Stadium, Polokwane
	Try: Siphosethu Mnebelele; Jean Erasmus; Riyaad Bam; Con: Viaan Mentoor (3); Pen: Viaan Mentoor	Report	Try: Rynhardt Jonker; Jason Hugo; Zian Cilliers; Gilermo Mentoe; Con: Sam Francis (2); Pen: Sam Francis	Referee: Excellent Mnkomo

27 March 2026	Sharks	10–21	Stormers	Kings Park Stadium, Durban
	Try: Scott Nell; Khuti Rasivhaga	Report	Try: Mfundo Ndhlovu (2); Keke Morabe; Con: Imad Khan (2); Dominic Malgas	Referee: Caleb Hibbers

=== Round 3 ===
11 April 2026	Bulls	68–26	Stormers	Loftus Versfeld, Pretoria
	Try: Ruan Enslin (2); JJ Theron (2); Shaun Schurmann (2); Neil le Roux; Riyaad Bam; Akahluwa Boqwana; Penalty try Con: Akahluwa Boqwana (4); Ruben Groenewald (2); Ian van der Merwe (2)	Report	Try: Asad Moos; Ezekiel Ngobeni; Joshua Boulle; Bruce Sherwood; Con: Kyle Smith (3)	Referee: Jonathan Lottering

=== Round 4 ===
18 April 2026	Lions XV	57–26	Sharks	Ellis Park Stadium, Johannesburg
13:00	Try: Rynhardt Jonker; Jason Hugo; Marno Grobbelaar; Gilermo Mentoe; Morne Venter; Exauce Kevani; Cecil Parsons; Likhona Finca (2); Con: Sam Francis (6)	Report	Try: Hanu Pieterse; Juan Loots; Chijindu Okonta; Albie Bester; Con: Chris Horak (3)	Referee: Stiaan Marx

18 April 2026	Stormers	17–36	Bulls	Cape Town Stadium, Cape Town
16:00	Try: Dominic Malgas; Keketso Morabe (2); Con: Imad Khan (1)	Report	Try: Riyaad Bam; Neil le Roux; Juann Else; JJ Theron; Penalty try Con: Viaan Mentoor (3); Drop: Ruben Groenewald	Referee: Juan de Bod

=== Round 5 ===
25 April 2025	Lions XV	49–31	Bulls	Ellis Park Stadium, Johannesburg
13:00	Try: Jason Hugo; Marno Grobbelaar; Exauce Kevani Tshiamala; Gilermo Mentoe; Michail Damon; Morne Venter; Hassiem Pead; Con: Sam Francis (7)	Report	Try: Duwan Potgieter; Marnus Rademeyer; Dieter Schubert; Shaun Schurmann; JJ Theron; Con: Viaan Mentoor (3)	Referee: Hernus Coetzee

25 April 2025	Stormers	41–7	Sharks	Cape Town Stadium, Cape Town
16:00	Try: Divan Fuller (4); Jonathan Roche; Hacjivah Dayimani; Josh Boulle; Con: Dominic Malgas (2); Kyle Smith	Report	Try: Christoff Etzebeth; Con: Stefan Moolman	Referee: Charlwin Daries

=== Round 6 ===
2 May 2026	Stormers	15–24	Lions XV	Cape Town Stadium, Cape Town
12:00		Report		Referee: Dylen November

2 May 2026	Sharks	21–17	Bulls	Kings Park Stadium, Durban
12:00	Try: Deon Slabbert, Sipho Nonyalela; Con: Tian Meyer (2)	Report	Try: Henry Immelman (2), Demitre Erasmus; Con: Keagan Johannes	Referee: Celeb Hibbert

=== Round 7 ===
8 May 2026	Lions XV	43-19	Stormers	Ellis Park, Johannesburg
13:00	Try: Morne Venter (4), Dylan Sjoblom, Zian Cilliers, Keagan Smith; Con: Matthew Coetzee (4)		Try: Vernon Paulo, Hencus van Wyk, Penalty try Con: Dominic Malgas	Referee: Stiaan Marx

9 May 2026	Bulls	54-12	Sharks	Loftus Versfeld, Pretoria]
13:00	Try: Junior Pokomela (2), Brooklyn Newman (2), Henry Immelman, Juann Else, Neil le Roux, Khutha Mchunu; Con: Keagan Johannes (6), Neil le Roux		Try: Sipho Nonyalela, William Ridl; Con: Tian Meyer	Referee: Zoe Naude

=== Grand final ===
15 May 2026	Lions	32–33	Bulls	Ellis Park, Johannesburg
13:00	Try: Marco Ferreira, Jason Hugo, Likhona Finca, Gilermo Mentoe; Con: Matt Coetzee (3); Pen: Matt Coetzee (2)	Report	Try: Henry Immelman, Ruan Enslin, Alulutho Tsakweni, Brooklyn Newman, Khutha Mchunu; Con: Keagan Johannes (4)	Referee: Paul Mente
