= SA Rugby Under-23 Cup =

Domestic rugby union competition

- Current season or competition: 2026 SA Rugby Under-23 Cup
- Sport: Rugby union
- Instituted: 2026
- Inaugural season: 2026
- Number of teams: 4
- Country: South Africa
- Holders: Bulls (2026)
- Most titles: Bulls (1)
- Related competition: Currie Cup, SA Cup

The SA Rugby Under-23 Cup was created in 2026 for junior player development and senior players returning from injury or who need game time for the four United Rugby Championship franchises - the Bulls, Lions, Sharks, and Stormers who do not currently feature in the SA Cup.

A key element of the tournament is the strategic allowance of up to seven over-age players (senior players) in each 23-player match-day squad, with a maximum of four of those players included in the starting line-up.

== Teams ==
SA Rugby Under-23 Cup teams
Team	Sponsored name
Bulls	Vodacom Bulls XV
Lions	Lions XV
Sharks	Hollywoodbets Sharks U23
Stormers	DHL Stormers XXIII

Location of teams in the SA Rugby Under-23 Cup

== Finals ==
The results of the finals played in the SA Cup competition are as follows:

SA Rugby Under-23 Cup finals
Season	Winner	Score	Runner-Up
2026	Bulls	33-22	Lions

=== Overall record ===
The overall record for the teams in the SA Rugby Under-23 Cup competition is as follows:

SA Rugby Under-23 Cup overall record
Team Name	Champions	Runner-Up	Semi-Final	Years Champion
Bulls	1	0	0	
Lions	0	1	0	
Sharks	0	0	0	
Stormers	0	0	0	

== See also ==
- Rugby union in South Africa
- Currie Cup
- SA Cup
- Mzanzi Challenge
- SuperSport Rugby Challenge
- Vodacom Cup
- Bankfin Nite Series
