= 2001 Currie Cup Top 8 =

Domestic rugby union competition

- Countries: South Africa
- Date: 20 September – 25 October 2001
- Champions: Western Province (31st title)
- Runners-up: Sharks
- Matches played: 19

The 2001 Currie Cup Top 8 series was the top tier of the final stage of the 63rd season of the Currie Cup, South Africa's premier domestic rugby union competition, since it started in 1889. The competition was known as the Bankfin Currie Cup for sponsorship reasons and this stage was contested from 20 September to 25 September 2001.

The Currie Cup was won by Western Province for the 31st time in their history; they beat the Sharks 29–24 in the final played on 25 October 2001.

== Competition rules and information ==
There were eight participating teams in the 2001 Currie Cup Top 8 stage. These teams qualified from a qualification series by finishing in the top four teams in one of two sections. The points accumulated against the three other teams that qualified were carried forward to the Top 8 stage. In the Top 8 stage, teams played the four teams from the opposite qualification section once, either at home or away.

Teams received four points for a win and two points for a draw. Bonus points were awarded to teams that scored four or more tries in a game, as well as to teams that lost a match by seven points or less. Teams were ranked by log points, then points difference (points scored less points conceded). The top four teams qualified for the semi-finals.

== Teams ==
Location of teams in the 2001 Currie Cup Top 8

2001 Currie Cup Top 8 teams
Team	Sponsored Name	Stadium/s	Sponsored Name
Blue Bulls	Blue Bulls	Loftus Versfeld, Pretoria	Minolta Loftus
Falcons	Falcons	Barnard Stadium, Kempton Park	Barnard Stadium
Free State Cheetahs	Vodacom Free State Cheetahs	Free State Stadium, Bloemfontein	Vodacom Park
Golden Lions	Golden Lions	Ellis Park Stadium, Johannesburg	Ellis Park Stadium
Griquas	Nashua Griquas	Griqua Park, Kimberley	ABSA Park
Mpumalanga Pumas	Mpumalanga Pumas	Johann van Riebeeck Stadium, Witbank	@lantic Park
Sharks	Sharks	University of Natal, Durban	University of Natal
Western Province	Fedsure Western Province	Newlands Stadium, Cape Town	Fedsure Park Newlands

== Log ==
The final log of the 2001 Currie Cup Top 8 series:

2001 Currie Cup Top 8 log
Pos	Team	Pld	W	D	L	PF	PA	PD	TB	LB	Pts	Qualification
1	Western Province	7	6	0	1	225	177	+48	1	0	25	Semi-finals
2	Sharks	7	5	0	2	251	141	+110	3	1	24	Semi-finals
3	Golden Lions	7	5	0	2	250	187	+63	4	0	24	Semi-finals
4	Free State Cheetahs	7	4	0	3	222	212	+10	3	2	21	Semi-finals
5	Falcons	7	4	0	3	223	220	+3	4	0	20	
6	Pumas	7	2	0	5	194	246	−52	4	1	13	
7	Blue Bulls	7	2	0	5	191	187	+4	2	2	12	
8	Griquas	7	0	0	7	184	370	−186	2	2	4	

Rules for classification: 4 points for a win; 2 points for a draw; 1 bonus point for a loss by seven points or less; 1 bonus point for scoring four or more tries in a match

== Matches ==
The following matches were played in the 2001 Currie Cup Top 8:

=== Round One ===
20 September 2001	Blue Bulls	17–24	Sharks	Loftus Versfeld, Pretoria
15:00	Try: Gavin Passens, Coenraad Groenewald; Con: Jaco van der Westhuyzen, Boeta Wessels; Pen: Jaco van der Westhuyzen	Scoreboard	Try: Deon Kyser (2), Herkie Kruger; Con: Herkie Kruger (3); Pen: Herkie Kruger

20 September 2001	Griquas	22–26	Free State Cheetahs	Griqua Park, Kimberley
15:00		Scoreboard

20 September 2001	Western Province	34–16	Golden Lions	Newlands Stadium, Cape Town
17:05		Scoreboard

21 September 2001	Mpumalanga Pumas	32–40	Falcons	Johann van Riebeeck Stadium, Witbank
15:00		Scoreboard

=== Round Two ===
26 September 2001	Sharks	65–17	Griquas	University of Natal, Durban
19:10		Scoreboard

27 September 2001	Falcons	26–35	Western Province	Barnard Stadium, Kempton Park
15:00		Scoreboard

27 September 2001	Free State Cheetahs	42–20	Blue Bulls	Free State Stadium, Bloemfontein
17:05	Try: Daan Human, Wylie Human, Johan Erasmus, Jimmy Powell, Edrich Fredericks; Con: Conrad Barnard (2), Kennedy Tsimba (2); Pen: Conrad Barnard (2), Kennedy Tsimba	Scoreboard	Try: Bakkies Botha, Jaco van der Westhuyzen; Con: Boeta Wessels (2); Pen: Boeta Wessels (2)

28 September 2001	Golden Lions	49–29	Mpumalanga Pumas	Ellis Park Stadium, Johannesburg
15:00		Scoreboard

=== Round Three ===
3 October 2001	Blue Bulls	23–15	Falcons	Loftus Versfeld, Pretoria
20:00	Try: Danie Rossouw, McNeil Hendricks, Wessel Roux; Con: Boeta Wessels; Pen: Boeta Wessels (2)	Scoreboard	Try: Ralf Schroeder, Wynand Lourens; Con: Juan Houtsamer; Pen: Juan Houtsamer

4 October 2001	Griquas	32–64	Golden Lions	Griqua Park, Kimberley
15:00		Scoreboard

4 October 2001	Mpumalanga Pumas	11–37	Sharks	Johann van Riebeeck Stadium, Witbank
17:05		Scoreboard

4 October 2001	Western Province	61–26	Free State Cheetahs	Newlands Stadium, Cape Town
19:10		Scoreboard

=== Round Four ===
10 October 2001	Falcons	65–30	Griquas	Barnard Stadium, Kempton Park
16:00		Scoreboard

10 October 2001	Free State Cheetahs	47–26	Mpumalanga Pumas	Free State Stadium, Bloemfontein
19:10		Scoreboard

11 October 2001	Golden Lions	32–22	Blue Bulls	Ellis Park Stadium, Johannesburg
15:00	Try: Gcobani Bobo (2), Thinus Delport, Andre Vos; Con: Louis Koen (3); Pen: Louis Koen (2)	Scoreboard	Try: McNeil Hendricks (2), Casper Steyn, Wessel Roux; Con: Casper Steyn

11 October 2001	Sharks	36–13	Western Province	University of Natal, Durban
17:05		Scoreboard

=== Semi-finals ===
18 October 2001	Sharks	16–9	Golden Lions	Kings Park Stadium, Durban
14:30		Scoreboard

18 October 2001	Western Province	40–18	Free State Cheetahs	Newlands Stadium, Cape Town
17:05		Scoreboard

=== Final ===
25 October 2001	Western Province	29–24	Sharks	Newlands Stadium, Cape Town
17:05		Scoreboard
