= 2001 Currie Cup qualification =

Domestic rugby union competition

- Countries: South Africa
- Date: 4 June – 13 September 2001
- Matches played: 42

The 2001 Currie Cup qualification series was the first stage of the 63rd season of the Currie Cup, South Africa's premier domestic rugby union competition, since it started in 1889. The competition was known as the Bankfin Currie Cup for sponsorship reasons and this stage was contested from 4 June to 13 September 2001.

The Falcons, Free State Cheetahs, Golden Lions and Sharks qualified for the 2001 Currie Cup Top 8 stage after finishing in the top four teams in Section X, while the Blue Bulls, Griquas, Pumas and Western Province qualified for the Top 8 stage after finishing in the top four teams in Section Y.

The Boland Cavaliers, Griffons and Mighty Elephants qualified for the 2001 Bankfin Cup after finishing in the bottom three in Section X, while the Border Bulldogs, Leopards and SWD Eagles qualified for the Bankfin Cup after finishing in the bottom three in Section Y.

== Competition rules and information ==
There were fourteen participating teams in the 2001 Currie Cup qualification series. These teams were divided into two sections, Section X and Section Y. Teams played all the other teams in their section once over the course of the qualification series, either at home or away.

Teams received four points for a win and two points for a draw. Bonus points were awarded to teams that scored four or more tries in a game, as well as to teams that lost a match by seven points or less. Teams were ranked by log points, then points difference (points scored less points conceded). The top four teams in each section qualified for the 2001 Currie Cup Top 8 and the bottom three teams in each section qualified for the 2001 Bankfin Cup.

== Teams ==
Location of teams in the 2001 Currie Cup qualification series
Section X
Section Y

=== Team listing ===
2001 Currie Cup qualification teams
| Team | Sponsored Name | Stadium/s | Sponsored Name |
|---|---|---|---|
| Blue Bulls | Blue Bulls | Loftus Versfeld, Pretoria | Minolta Loftus |
| Boland Cavaliers | Boland Cavaliers | Boland Stadium, Wellington | Boland Stadium |
| Border Bulldogs | Spoornet Bulldogs | Waverley Park, East London | ABSA Stadium |
| Falcons | Falcons | Barnard Stadium, Kempton Park | Barnard Stadium |
| Free State Cheetahs | Vodacom Free State Cheetahs | Free State Stadium, Bloemfontein | Vodacom Park |
| Golden Lions | Golden Lions | Ellis Park Stadium, Johannesburg | Ellis Park Stadium |
| Griffons | Griffons | North West Stadium, Welkom | North West Stadium |
| Griquas | Nashua Griquas | Griqua Park, Kimberley | ABSA Park |
| Leopards | Leopards | Olën Park, Potchefstroom | Olën Park |
| Mighty Elephants | Mighty Elephants | PE Stadium, Port Elizabeth | PE Stadium |
| Mpumalanga Pumas | Mpumalanga Pumas | Johann van Riebeeck Stadium, Witbank | @lantic Park |
| Sharks | Sharks | University of Natal, Durban | University of Natal |
| SWD Eagles | Vodacom Eagles | Outeniqua Park, George | Outeniqua Park |
| Western Province | Fedsure Western Province | Newlands Stadium, Cape Town | Fedsure Park Newlands |

== Log ==
The final log of the 2001 Currie Cup qualification series:

Section X
| Pos | Team | Pld | W | D | L | PF | PA | PD | TF | TA | TB | LB | Pts | Qualification |
|---|---|---|---|---|---|---|---|---|---|---|---|---|---|---|
| 1 | Falcons | 6 | 5 | 0 | 1 | 218 | 183 | +35 | 28 | 20 | 4 | 0 | 24 | 2001 Currie Cup Top 8 |
| 2 | Golden Lions | 6 | 5 | 0 | 1 | 223 | 164 | +59 | 27 | 15 | 3 | 0 | 23 | 2001 Currie Cup Top 8 |
| 3 | Sharks | 6 | 4 | 0 | 2 | 231 | 141 | +90 | 24 | 16 | 4 | 1 | 21 | 2001 Currie Cup Top 8 |
| 4 | Free State Cheetahs | 6 | 4 | 0 | 2 | 243 | 162 | +81 | 27 | 19 | 3 | 2 | 21 | 2001 Currie Cup Top 8 |
| 5 | Boland Cavaliers | 6 | 1 | 1 | 4 | 171 | 202 | −31 | 23 | 23 | 3 | 1 | 10 | 2001 Bankfin Cup |
| 6 | Griffons | 6 | 1 | 0 | 5 | 170 | 261 | −91 | 20 | 37 | 2 | 0 | 6 | 2001 Bankfin Cup |
| 7 | Mighty Elephants | 6 | 0 | 1 | 5 | 121 | 264 | −143 | 14 | 33 | 1 | 1 | 4 | 2001 Bankfin Cup |

Rules for classification: 4 points for a win; 2 points for a draw; 1 bonus point for a loss by seven points or less; 1 bonus point for scoring four or more tries in a match

Section Y
| Pos | Team | Pld | W | D | L | PF | PA | PD | TF | TA | TB | LB | Pts | Qualification |
|---|---|---|---|---|---|---|---|---|---|---|---|---|---|---|
| 1 | Western Province | 6 | 6 | 0 | 0 | 210 | 120 | +90 | 25 | 11 | 3 | 0 | 27 | 2001 Currie Cup Top 8 |
| 2 | Pumas | 6 | 5 | 0 | 1 | 313 | 133 | +180 | 39 | 14 | 5 | 1 | 26 | 2001 Currie Cup Top 8 |
| 3 | Blue Bulls | 6 | 4 | 0 | 2 | 231 | 148 | +83 | 30 | 13 | 3 | 1 | 20 | 2001 Currie Cup Top 8 |
| 4 | Griquas | 6 | 3 | 0 | 3 | 201 | 220 | −19 | 19 | 28 | 2 | 1 | 15 | 2001 Currie Cup Top 8 |
| 5 | Leopards | 6 | 1 | 0 | 5 | 172 | 216 | −44 | 19 | 25 | 3 | 0 | 7 | 2001 Bankfin Cup |
| 6 | Border Bulldogs | 6 | 1 | 0 | 5 | 139 | 234 | −95 | 16 | 30 | 2 | 0 | 6 | 2001 Bankfin Cup |
| 7 | SWD Eagles | 6 | 1 | 0 | 5 | 124 | 319 | −195 | 16 | 43 | 1 | 1 | 6 | 2001 Bankfin Cup |

Rules for classification: 4 points for a win; 2 points for a draw; 1 bonus point for a loss by seven points or less; 1 bonus point for scoring four or more tries in a match

== Matches ==
The following matches were played in the 2001 Currie Cup qualification series:

=== Section X ===
==== Round One ====
| 4 July 2001 | Sharks | 36–17 | Golden Lions | University of Natal, Durban |
| | | Scoreboard |

| 5 July 2001 | Falcons | 51–25 | Griffons | Barnard Stadium, Kempton Park |
| | | Scoreboard |

| 5 July 2001 | Mighty Elephants | 22–22 | Boland Cavaliers | PE Stadium, Port Elizabeth |
| | | Scoreboard |

==== Round Two ====
| 11 July 2001 | Free State Cheetahs | 51–39 | Griffons | Free State Stadium, Bloemfontein |
| | | Scoreboard |

| 12 July 2001 | Falcons | 56–36 | Mighty Elephants | Barnard Stadium, Kempton Park |
| | | Scoreboard |

| 12 July 2001 | Golden Lions | 51–46 | Boland Cavaliers | Ellis Park Stadium, Johannesburg |
| | | Scoreboard |

==== Round Three ====
| 1 August 2001 | Mighty Elephants | 18–30 | Golden Lions | PE Stadium, Port Elizabeth |
| | | Scoreboard |

| 2 August 2001 | Boland Cavaliers | 19–36 | Free State Cheetahs | Boland Stadium, Wellington |
| | | Scoreboard |

| 3 August 2001 | Griffons | 31–47 | Sharks | North West Stadium, Welkom |
| | | Scoreboard |

==== Round Four ====
| 16 August 2001 | Free State Cheetahs | 75–21 | Mighty Elephants | Free State Stadium, Bloemfontein |
| | | Scoreboard |

| 16 August 2001 | Golden Lions | 49–15 | Falcons | Ellis Park Stadium, Johannesburg |
| | | Scoreboard |

| 16 August 2001 | Sharks | 37–20 | Boland Cavaliers | University of Natal, Durban |
| | | Scoreboard |

==== Round Five ====
| 30 August 2001 | Boland Cavaliers | 42–22 | Griffons | Boland Stadium, Wellington |
| | | Scoreboard |

| 30 August 2001 | Falcons | 32–26 | Free State Cheetahs | Barnard Stadium, Kempton Park |
| | | Scoreboard |

| 31 August 2001 | Mighty Elephants | 7–58 | Sharks | PE Stadium, Port Elizabeth |
| | | Scoreboard |

==== Round Six ====
| 6 September 2001 | Golden Lions | 23–19 | Free State Cheetahs | Ellis Park Stadium, Johannesburg |
| | | Scoreboard |

| 6 September 2001 | Griffons | 23–17 | Mighty Elephants | North West Stadium, Welkom |
| | | Scoreboard |

| 6 September 2001 | Sharks | 25–30 | Falcons | University of Natal, Durban |
| | | Scoreboard |

==== Round Seven ====
| 12 September 2001 | Boland Cavaliers | 22–34 | Falcons | Boland Stadium, Wellington |
| | | Scoreboard |

| 13 September 2001 | Free State Cheetahs | 36–28 | Sharks | Free State Stadium, Bloemfontein |
| | | Scoreboard |

| 13 September 2001 | Griffons | 30–53 | Golden Lions | North West Stadium, Welkom |
| | | Scoreboard |

=== Section Y ===
==== Round One ====
| 5 July 2001 | Pumas | 59–22 | Border Bulldogs | Johann van Riebeeck Stadium, Witbank |
| | | Scoreboard |

| 5 July 2001 | SWD Eagles | 24–28 | Blue Bulls | Outeniqua Park, George |
| | Try: Riaan Thomas, Patrick Bell; Con: Noel Oelschig; Pen: Noel Oelschig (3); Drop: Bevan Fortuin | Scoreboard | Try: Keegan Fredericks, Johan Wasserman, Chris le Roux; Con: Casper Steyn (2); Pen: Casper Steyn (3) |

| 5 July 2001 | Western Province | 33–6 | Leopards | Newlands Stadium, Cape Town |
| | | Scoreboard |

==== Round Two ====
| 11 July 2001 | Border Bulldogs | 39–26 | Leopards | Waverley Park, East London |
| | | Scoreboard |

| 12 July 2001 | Pumas | 22–13 | Blue Bulls | Johann van Riebeeck Stadium, Witbank |
| | Try: Jacques Juries; Con: Nel Fourie; Pen: Nel Fourie (5) | Scoreboard | Try: Tiaan Joubert; Con: Jaco van der Westhuyzen; Pen: Casper Steyn, Jaco van der Westhuyzen |

| 13 July 2001 | Western Province | 27–26 | Griquas | Newlands Stadium, Cape Town |
| | | Scoreboard |

==== Round Three ====
| 2 August 2001 | Blue Bulls | 54–18 | Border Bulldogs | Loftus Versfeld, Pretoria |
| | Try: Ryno Hendricks, Norman Jordaan, Johan Wasserman, Frikkie Welsh, Hannes Venter (3), Giscard Pieters; Con: Jaco van der Westhuyzen (7) | Scoreboard | Try: Ian Fihlani, Reon Kockjew; Con: Russel Bennet; Pen: Greg Miller (2) |

| 2 August 2001 | Griquas | 27–46 | Pumas | Griqua Park, Kimberley |
| | | Scoreboard |

| 2 August 2001 | SWD Eagles | 19–63 | Western Province | Outeniqua Park, George |
| | | Scoreboard |

==== Round Four ====
| 15 August 2001 | Border Bulldogs | 14–22 | Griquas | Waverley Park, East London |
| | | Scoreboard |

| 15 August 2001 | Leopards | 32–40 | Blue Bulls | Olën Park, Potchefstroom |
| | Try: Theunis Barnard, Bennie Kotze, Lawrence Nkosi, Mark Johnson; Con: Francois Swart (4) | Scoreboard | Try: Anton Leonard, Frikkie Welsh, Wessel Roux, Jaco van der Westhuyzen (2); Con: Jaco van der Westhuyzen (3); Pen: Jaco van der Westhuyzen (3) |

| 16 August 2001 | Pumas | 111–14 | SWD Eagles | Johann van Riebeeck Stadium, Witbank |
| | | Scoreboard |

==== Round Five ====
| 30 August 2001 | Griquas | 52–35 | Leopards | Griqua Park, Kimberley |
| | | Scoreboard |

| 30 August 2001 | SWD Eagles | 41–24 | Border Bulldogs | Outeniqua Park, George |
| | | Scoreboard |

| 30 August 2001 | Western Province | 33–28 | Pumas | Newlands Stadium, Cape Town |
| | | Scoreboard |

==== Round Six ====
| 5 September 2001 | Border Bulldogs | 22–32 | Western Province | Waverley Park, East London |
| | | Scoreboard |

| 6 September 2001 | Leopards | 49–5 | SWD Eagles | Olën Park, Potchefstroom |
| | | Scoreboard |

| 7 September 2001 | Blue Bulls | 77–30 | Griquas | Loftus Versfeld, Pretoria |
| | Try: Coenrad Groenewald (3), Anton Leonard (3), Jaco van der Westhuyzen (2), Frikkie Welsh (2), Danie Coetzee, Casper Steyn; Con: Jaco van der Westhuyzen (7); Pen: Jaco van der Westhuyzen | Scoreboard | Try: Thando Manana, Dennis du Plessis, Dawie Theron; Con: Edrich Lubbe (3); Pen: Edrich Lubbe (3) |

==== Round Seven ====
| 13 September 2001 | Blue Bulls | 19–22 | Western Province | Loftus Versfeld, Pretoria |
| | Try: Joost van der Westhuizen; Con: Boeta Wessels; Pen: Boeta Wessels (4) | Scoreboard | Try: Braam van Straaten; Con: Braam van Straaten; Pen: Braam van Straaten (5) |

| 13 September 2001 | Griquas | 44–21 | SWD Eagles | Griqua Park, Kimberley |
| | | Scoreboard |

| 13 September 2001 | Leopards | 24–47 | Pumas | Olën Park, Potchefstroom |
| | | Scoreboard |
