= Teljoy Cup =

The Teljoy Cup was an annual fixture between Northern Transvaal and Transvaal rugby unions. The first Teljoy Cup was held on 19 April 1986. The Northern Transvaal took the first trophy when they beat Transvaal 24–15. The last fixture was held in 1992 overall the Northern Transvaal won the trophy 5 times and Transvaal 1.

== Results of the Teljoy Cup between Northern Transvaal and Transvaal was ==
19 April 1986	Transvaal	15–24	Northern Transvaal	Ellis Park Stadium

1987	Northern Transvaal	19–6	Transvaal	Loftus Versfeld, Pretoria

1988	Transvaal	6–15	Northern Transvaal	Ellis Park Stadium

1990	Northern Transvaal	24–9	Transvaal	Loftus Versfeld, Pretoria

1991	Transvaal	31–16	Northern Transvaal	Ellis Park Stadium

1992	Northern Transvaal	23–13	Transvaal	Loftus Versfeld, Pretoria
