= Blue Bulls Rugby Union =

South African sports organisation

- Abbreviation: BBRU
- Formation: 1938
- Type: Sport federation
- Headquarters: Loftus Versfeld Stadium
- Location: Pretoria
- President: Willem Strauss
- Website: bluebullsrugbyunion.co.za

The Blue Bulls Rugby Union, previously Northern Transvaal Rugby Union, is the governing body for rugby union in Pretoria, two neighboring municipalities in Gauteng Province, and all of Limpopo Province, in South Africa. The union's headquarters and home stadium is Loftus Versfeld in Pretoria.

The union operates teams in United Rugby Championship (the Bulls), and in South Africa's domestic Currie Cup and Rugby Challenge competitions (both the Blue Bulls). For sponsorship reasons, the teams are currently called the Vodacom Bulls and Vodacom Blue Bulls (Afrikaans: Vodacom Blou Bulle).

== History ==
The Blue Bulls (Blue Bulls Rugby Union) or Blou Bulle (Afrikaans) was formed in 1938 as the Northern Transvaal Rugby Union (N.T.R.U.). Prior to the formation of the union, the region's clubs were under the jurisdiction of the then Transvaal Rugby Union (now Golden Lions Rugby Union). Northern Transvaal (under the NTRU), captained by Danie Craven, played its first home game as an independent union on 28 May 1938. The game against the Orange Free State team ended in a draw, 11:11. In its first 75 years, the team competed for the Currie Cup in 55 seasons, and won 23 Currie Cup titles in 53 finals. In the same period 127 Springboks hailed from the Union, and it won 3 Super Rugby titles.
