= Henry Immelman =

South African rugby union player

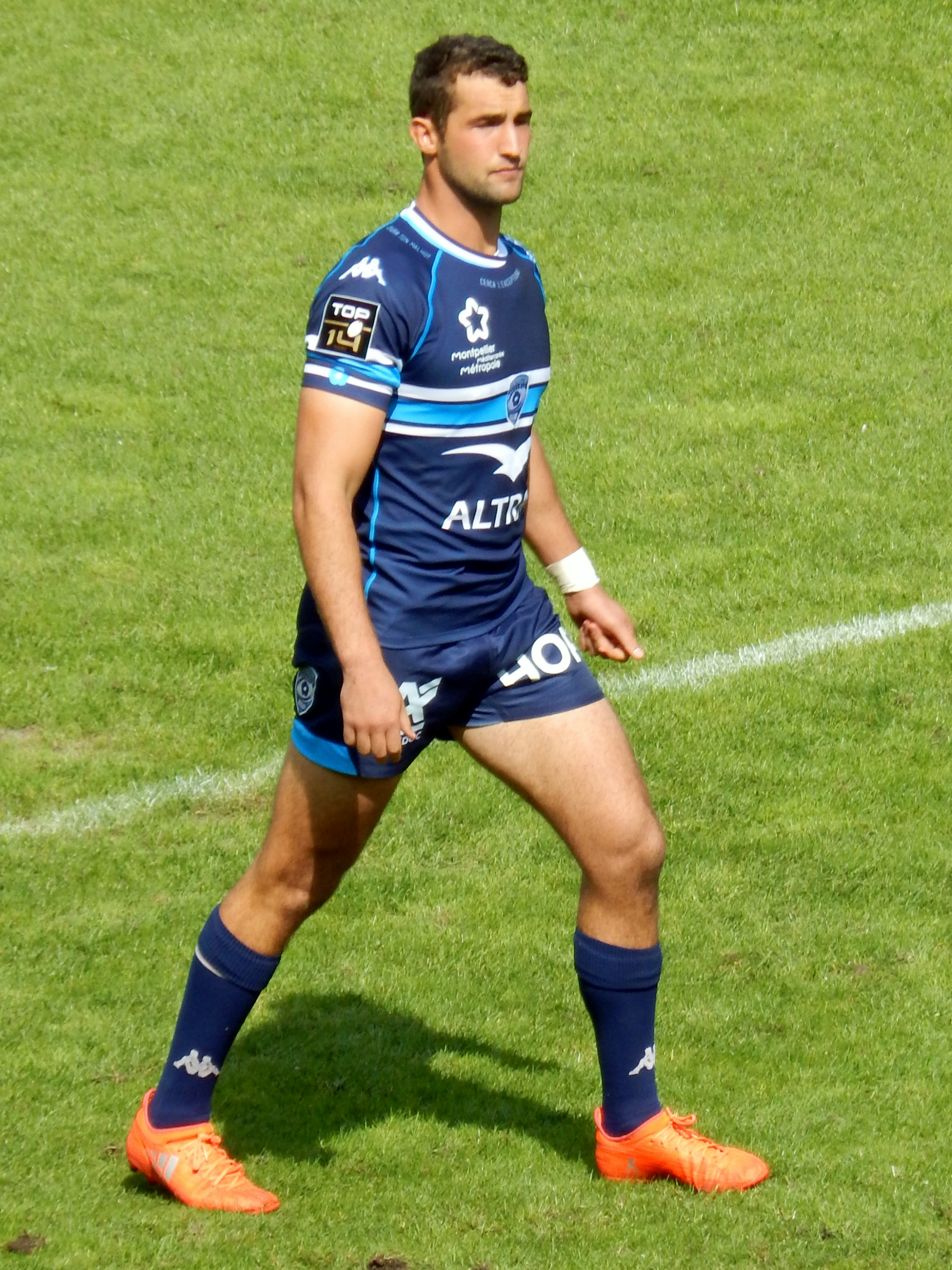
- Born: 26 May 1995 (age 31) Upington, South Africa
- Height: 1.89 m (6 ft 2 1/2 in)
- Weight: 107 kg (16 st 12 lb; 236 lb)
- School: Grey College
- University: Central University of Technology

Rugby union career
- Position(s): Centre, Fullback, Wing
- Current team: Blue Bulls
Senior career
Years	Team	Apps	(Points)
2016–2021	Montpellier	77	(77)
2021–2023	Edinburgh Rugby	25	(38)
2023–	Bulls	0	(0)
- Correct as of 26 April 2023

Henry Immelman (born 26 May 1995) is a South African rugby union player who last played for the Bulls in the United Rugby Championship.

== Rugby career ==
=== 2013–2016: Free State Cheetahs and CUT Ixias ===
He was born in Upington, but attended Grey College in Bloemfontein. He was selected to represent the Free State Cheetahs at the Under-18 Craven Week in Polokwane in 2013.

After school, he joined the Free State Cheetahs' academy, and he made seven starts for the Free State U21 team in the 2014 Under-21 Provincial Championship, scoring 22 points.

He made four appearances for the Bloemfontein-based university side CUT Ixias in the 2015 Varsity Cup in a poor season that saw the team lose all seven of their matches. He again played for the Free State U21 team in the Under-21 Provincial Championship in the second half of the year, making eleven starts and scoring 23 points as the team made it to the final of the competition before losing 17–52 to Western Province U21.

He made a further six starts for CUT Ixias in the 2016 Varsity Cup, helping them to two victories and sixth place on the log. He was also included in the Free State XV squad that competed in the 2016 Currie Cup qualification series, but he failed to make any appearances in the competition.

=== 2016–2021: Montpellier ===
Henry Immelman moved to France in July 2016 to join Top 14 side Montpellier, signing a youth contract with the team. He made his debut for the senior team in their Round 6 match against Brive, replacing Alexandre Dumoulin for the second half of the match.

=== 2021–2023: Edinburgh Rugby ===
In April 2021, it was announced that Immelman would move to Edinburgh Rugby ahead of the 2021/22 season (the first of the new United Rugby Championship to include 4 South African Teams). In September of that year, he played for the side in their pre-season friendly against Newcastle Falcons. -

== Honours ==
- SA Rugby Under-23 Cup winner (2026)
