= Keagan Johannes =

South African rugby union player

- Full name: Keagan Johannes
- Born: 27 November 1999 (age 26) South Africa

Rugby union career
- Position: Scrum-half
- Current team: Bulls / Blue Bulls
Senior career
Years	Team	Apps	(Points)
2021–	Blue Bulls	20	(20)
2021–	Bulls	7	(0)
- Correct as of 23 July 2022

Keagan Johannes (born 27 November 1999) is a South African rugby union player for the Bulls in the United Rugby Championship and the Blue Bulls in the Currie Cup. His regular position is scrum-half.

Johannes was named in the Blue Bulls side for their Round 7 match of the 2020–21 Currie Cup Premier Division against the Pumas. He made his debut in the same fixture, coming on as a replacement scrum-half.

== Honours ==
- Currie Cup winner (2021)
- SA Rugby Under-23 Cup winner (2026)
