= Khutha Mchunu =

South African rugby union player

- Full name: Khuthazani Kingdom Mchunu
- Born: 1 July 1997 (age 29) Greytown, South Africa
- Height: 1.84 m (6 ft 1/2 in)
- Weight: 117 kg (258 lb; 18 st 6 lb)
- School: Glenwood High School
- Notable relative: Ntuthuko Mchunu (brother)

Rugby union career
- Position: Prop
- Current team: Blue Bulls, Bulls
Youth career
- 2014–2018: Sharks
Senior career
| Years | Team | Apps | (Points) |
| 2018–2019 | Sharks XV | 15 | (10) |
| 2018–2019 | Sharks (Currie Cup) | 4 | (0) |
| 2019–2020 | Sharks | 2 | (0) |
| 2020 | Cheetahs | 3 | (0) |
| 2020–2021 | Free State Cheetahs | 6 | (0) |
| 2021–2025 | Sharks | 21 | (5) |
| 2021–2025 | Sharks (Currie Cup) | 11 | (0) |
| 2025 | Mitsubishi Sagamihara Dynaboars | 6 | (0) |
| 2025– | Bulls | | |
| 2025– | Blue Bulls | | |
- Correct as of 23 July 2022

Khuthazani Kingdom Mchunu (born 1 July 1997) is a South African rugby union player for the Bulls in Super Rugby and in the Currie Cup and the Blue Bulls in the Rugby Challenge. His regular position is prop.

== Honours ==
- SA Rugby Under-23 Cup winner (2026)
