= JJ Theron =

South African rugby union player

- Full name: Jacques J Theron
- Born: 8 February 2005 (age 21) Upington, South Africa
- Height: 195 cm (6 ft 5 in)
- Weight: 108 kg (238 lb; 17 st 0 lb)
- School: Grey College, Bloemfontein

Rugby union career
- Position: Flanker / Number 8
- Current team: Bulls / Blue Bulls
Senior career
Years	Team	Apps	(Points)
2025–	Blue Bulls		
2025–	Bulls	5	(0)
- Correct as of 30 November 2025
International career
Years	Team	Apps	(Points)
2025	South Africa U20	7	(10)
- Correct as of 30 November 2025

JJ Theron (born 8 February 2005) is a South African rugby union player, who plays for the Bulls and Blue Bulls. His preferred position is flanker or number 8.

== Early career ==
Theron attended Grey College, Bloemfontein where he played rugby for the first XV, captaining the side. His school performances earned him selection for the South Africa Schools side, captaining them in 2023. In 2025, he represented the South Africa U20 side.

== Professional career ==
Theron represented the Cheetahs in junior rugby, representing their Craven Week side in 2022 and 2023. In 2024, he joined up with the Bulls academy, being selected in the South African Rugby Academy. He made his Currie Cup debut for the Blue Bulls in the 2025 Currie Cup Premier Division. Following this, he made his Bulls debut in the opening round of the 2025–26 United Rugby Championship against the Ospreys.
