= 2001 Bankfin Cup =

Domestic rugby union competition

- Countries: South Africa
- Date: 19 September – 17 October 2001
- Champions: Boland Cavaliers (1st title)
- Runners-up: Leopards
- Matches played: 12

The 2001 Bankfin Cup was the second tier of the second stage of the 63rd season of the Currie Cup, South Africa's premier domestic rugby union competition, since it started in 1889. The competition was known as the Bankfin Cup for sponsorship reasons and this stage was contested from 19 September to 17 September 2001.

The Bankfin Cup was won by Boland Cavaliers for the first time in their history; they beat the Leopards 41–27 in the final played on 17 October 2001.

== Competition rules and information ==
There were six participating teams in the 2001 Bankfin Cup. These teams qualified from a qualification series by finishing in the bottom three teams in one of two sections. The points accumulated against the two other teams that qualified were carried forward to the Bankfin Cup stage. In this stage, teams played the three teams from the opposite qualification section once, either at home or away.

Teams received four points for a win and two points for a draw. Bonus points were awarded to teams that scored four or more tries in a game, as well as to teams that lost a match by seven points or less. Teams were ranked by log points, then points difference (points scored less points conceded). The top four teams qualified for the semi-finals.

== Teams ==
Location of teams in the 2001 Bankfin Cup

=== Team Listing ===
2001 Bankfin Cup teams
Team	Sponsored Name	Stadium/s	Sponsored Name
Boland Cavaliers	Boland Cavaliers	Boland Stadium, Wellington	Boland Stadium
Border Bulldogs	Spoornet Bulldogs	Waverley Park, East London	ABSA Stadium
Griffons	Griffons	North West Stadium, Welkom	North West Stadium
Leopards	Leopards	Olën Park, Potchefstroom	Olën Park
Mighty Elephants	Mighty Elephants	PE Stadium, Port Elizabeth	PE Stadium
SWD Eagles	Vodacom Eagles	Outeniqua Park, George	Outeniqua Park

== Log ==
Final 2001 Bankfin Cup log
Pos	Team	Pld	W	D	L	PF	PA	PD	TB	LB	Pts	Qualification
1	Boland Cavaliers	5	4	1	0	161	120	+41	4	0	22	Qualify to the semi-finals
2	Leopards	5	3	0	2	159	120	+39	1	1	14	Qualify to the semi-finals
3	Mighty Elephants	5	2	1	2	116	113	+3	0	2	12	Qualify to the semi-finals
4	Border Bulldogs	5	2	0	3	126	130	−4	2	1	11	Qualify to the semi-finals
5	Griffons	5	2	0	3	129	149	−20	2	0	10	
6	SWD Eagles	5	1	0	4	133	192	−59	2	1	7	

Rules for classification:
- 4 points for a win
- 2 points for a draw
- 1 bonus point for a loss by seven points or less
- 1 bonus point for scoring four or more tries in a match

== Matches ==
The following matches were played in the 2001 Bankfin Cup:

=== Round One ===
19 September 2001	Boland Cavaliers	47–36	SWD Eagles	Boland Stadium, Wellington
16:00		Scoreboard

20 September 2001	Mighty Elephants	27–17	Border Bulldogs	PE Stadium, Port Elizabeth
15:30		Scoreboard

20 September 2001	Leopards	29–21	Griffons	Olën Park, Potchefstroom
16:00		Scoreboard

=== Round Two ===
26 September 2001	Border Bulldogs	10–14	Boland Cavaliers	Waverley Park, East London
19:30		Scoreboard

27 September 2001	Griffons	41–25	SWD Eagles	North West Stadium, Welkom
15:00		Scoreboard

27 September 2001	Leopards	25–19	Mighty Elephants	Olën Park, Potchefstroom
16:00		Scoreboard

=== Round Three ===
4 October 2001	Boland Cavaliers	36–30	Leopards	Boland Stadium, Wellington
15:30		Scoreboard

4 October 2001	SWD Eagles	26–31	Mighty Elephants	Outeniqua Park, George
15:30		Scoreboard

4 October 2001	Border Bulldogs	36–22	Griffons	Waverley Park, East London
15:45		Scoreboard

=== Semi-finals ===
11 October 2001	Boland Cavaliers	68–29	Border Bulldogs	Boland Stadium, Wellington
15:30		Scoreboard

11 October 2001	Leopards	43–42	Mighty Elephants	Olën Park, Potchefstroom
13:30		Scoreboard

=== Final ===
17 October 2001	Boland Cavaliers	41–27	Leopards	Boland Stadium, Wellington
16:30		Scoreboard
