= Neil le Roux =

South African rugby union player (born 2003)

- Born: 16 April 2003 (age 23)
- Height: 1.74 m (5 ft 9 in)
- Weight: 77 kg (12 st 2 lb; 170 lb)
- School: Hoër Landbouskool Oakdale

Rugby union career
- Position: Scrum-half
Youth career
- –2024: Bulls
Senior career
Years	Team	Apps	(Points)
2024–2026	Bath	7	(10)
International career
Years	Team	Apps	(Points)
2022–2023	South Africa U20		

Neil le Roux (born 16 April 2003) is a South African professional rugby union footballer who plays as a scrum-half. He last played for Bath Rugby.

== Early life ==
He attended Hoër Landbouskool Oakdale secondary school in Riversdale, Western Cape, South Africa.

== Club career ==
In South Africa he was in the youth squad of Bulls prior to joining Bath Rugby in February 2024, with the signing coming despite his need for rehabilitation from injury.

He featured for Bath in the Premiership Rugby Cup during the 2024-25 season, making a try-scoring debut against Ampthill RUFC in November 2024. He went on to score a try for Bath in a 43-26 win over Bedford Blues in the competition in February 2025. In May 2025, he had his contract extended by Bath. In April 2026, he left Bath with immediate effect, having made eight appearances in the 2025-26 season.

== International career ==
Le Roux represented South Africa at under-20 level and played as part of their squad for the 2023 World Rugby U20 Championship.
