= Bankfin Nite Series =

Rugby union competition in South Africa

- Sport: Rugby union
- Founded: 1996
- First season: 1996
- Folded: 1997
- Country: South Africa; Namibia; Zimbabwe
- Most titles: Free State / Western Province (1)
- Sponsor: Bankfin
- Related competitions: Currie Cup

The Bankfin Nite Series was a rugby union competition in South Africa. There were two editions of this competition, in 1996 and 1997. It was sponsored by Bankfin, who also sponsored the Currie Cup competitions. After two seasons, it was succeeded by the Vodacom Cup competition.

In 1996, there were twelve competing teams – ten of the fourteen provincial unions, plus teams from Namibia and Zimbabwe. The four provincial unions that took part in the 1996 Super 12 season - Natal, Northern Transvaal, Transvaal and Western Province – did not play in the competition. Free State won the competition, beating Border 46–34 in the final.

Namibia and Zimbabwe withdrew from the 1997 competition, while Western Province replaced defending champions Free State, who in turn replaced Western Province in the 1997 Super 12 season. Western Province won the competition, beating Western Cape rivals Boland Cavaliers 36–25 in the final.

== Season summary ==
The summaries for the two Bankfin Nite Series seasons are as follows:

Year	Winner	Score	Runner-up	Losing semi-finalists
1996	Free State	46–34	Border	Griqualand West, South Eastern Transvaal
1997	Western Province	36–25	Boland Cavaliers	Griquas, Pumas

Each team's results in the competition are listed below:

Bankfin Nite Series 1996–1997
Team name	Former Name	1996	1997
Boland Cavaliers	Boland	4th (Section A)	Lost in Final
Border Bulldogs	Border	Lost in Final	8th
Falcons	Eastern Transvaal	3rd (Section B)	10th
Free State Cheetahs	Free State	Champions	—N/a
Griffons	Northern Free State	4th (Section B)	9th
Griquas	Griqualand West	Lost in semi-final	Lost in semi-final
Leopards	North West	5th (Section A)	6th
Mighty Elephants	Eastern Province	3rd (Section A)	7th
Namibia XV	Namibia XV	6th (Section A)	—N/a
Pumas	South Eastern Transvaal	Lost in semi-final	Lost in semi-final
SWD Eagles	South Western Districts	5th (Section B)	5th
Western Province	Western Province	—N/a	Champions
Zimbabwe XV	Zimbabwe XV	6th (Section B)	—N/a

== Seasons ==
=== 1996 Bankfin Nite Series ===
There were twelve teams in the 1996 Bankfin Nite Series. They were divided into two sections of six teams each. Each team played all the teams in the other section twice over the course of the season, once at home and once away.

Teams received five points for a win, two points for a draw and one point for a loss. Bonus points were also awarded based on the number of tries scored – 4 bonus points were awarded for scoring ten or more tries in a match, 3 bonus points for scoring six to nine tries, 2 bonus points for scoring four or five tries and 1 bonus point for scoring two or three tries in a match. Teams were ranked by log points, then points difference (points scored less points conceded).

The top two teams in each section qualified for the title play-off semi-finals. The team that finished first in each section had home advantage against the team that the team that finished second in the other section, with the semi-final winners advancing to the final.

1996 Bankfin Nite Series
Section A
Pos	Team	P	W	D	L	PF	PA	PD	Pts
1	Border	12	7	1	4	475	344	+131	66
2	South Eastern Transvaal	12	9	0	3	395	234	+161	
3	Eastern Province	12	8	0	4	390	171	+219	61
4	Boland	12	6	1	5	470	359	+111	
5	North West	12	6	0	6	358	393	−35	
6	Namibia	12	2	0	10	147	516	−369	
Section B
Pos	Team	P	W	D	L	PF	PA	PD	Pts
1	Free State	12	11	0	1	632	218	+414	84
2	Griqualand West	12	12	0	0	404	184	+220	84
3	Eastern Transvaal	12	3	2	7	331	393	−62	
4	Northern Free State	12	4	0	8	317	323	−6	
5	South Western Districts	12	1	0	11	205	513	−308	
6	Zimbabwe	12	1	0	11	128	604	−476	
Final standings.

Legend and competition rules
Legend:
Qualify to the semi-finals.	P = Games played, W = Games won, D = Games drawn, L = Games lost, PF = Points for, PA = Points against, PD = Points difference, TF = Tries for, TA = Tries against, TB = Try bonus points, LB = Losing bonus points, Pts = Log points
Competition rules:
Qualification: The top four teams qualified to the semi-finals.
Points breakdown: * 5 points for a win * 2 points for a draw * 1 point for a loss * 4 bonus points for scoring ten or more tries in a match * 3 bonus points for scoring six to nine tries in a match * 2 bonus points for scoring four or five tries in a match * 1 bonus point for scoring two or three tries in a match

The following fixtures were played in the 1996 Bankfin Nite Series:

1996 Bankfin Nite Series
Section A
Team	ETv	FrS	GrW	NFS	SWD	Zim
Boland	27–27	16–36	21–23	66–23	34–23	96–5
Border	53–12	29–37	22–34	40–23	48–24	85–3
Eastern Province	67–8	11–14	6–16	19–13	64–13	64–3
Namibia	16–46	13–71		13–15	27–15	13–15
North West	42–29	16–47	18–38	33–20	28–20	77–9
South Eastern Transvaal	23–15	27–26	11–16	25–23	54–5	95–13
Section B
Team	Bol	Bor	EPr	Nam	NWe	SET
Eastern Transvaal	30–34	31–31	17–25	57–23	37–29	22–23
Free State	83–22	86–24	35–16	111–7	63–23	23–14
Griqualand West	53–26	58–32	17–14	75–0	52–17	22–17
Northern Free State	32–25	16–20	15–22	55–3	54–25	28–32
South Western Districts	12–54	8–66	6–47	38–13	16–24	25–54
Zimbabwe	12–49	12–25	14–35	18–19	8–26	16–20

==== Semi-finals ====
22 May 1996	Free State	52–7	South Eastern Transvaal

22 May 1996	Border	20–8	Griqualand West

==== Final ====
24 May 1996	Free State	46–34	Border

=== 1997 Bankfin Nite Series ===
There were ten teams in the 1997 Bankfin Nite Series. Each team played all the other teams once over the course of the season, either at home or away.

Teams received four points for a win and two points for a draw. Bonus points were awarded to teams that scored four or more tries in a game, as well as to teams that lost a match by seven points or less. Teams were ranked by log points, then points difference (points scored less points conceded).

The top four teams qualified for the title play-off semi-finals. The team that finished first had home advantage against the team that finished fourth, while the team that finished second had home advantage against the team that finish third, with the semi-final winners advancing to the final.

1997 Bankfin Nite Series
Pos	Team	P	W	D	L	PF	PA	PD	Pts
1	Western Province	9	9	0	0	429	160	+269	44
2	Boland Cavaliers	9	8	0	1	315	173	+142	38
3	Pumas	9	7	0	2	219	221	−2	30
4	Griquas	9	5	0	4	281	199	+82	27
5	SWD Eagles	9	5	0	4	282	212	+70	26
6	Leopards	9	4	0	5	239	236	+3	19
7	Mighty Elephants	9	3	0	6	195	232	−37	17
8	Border Bulldogs	9	2	0	7	131	305	−174	10
9	Griffons	9	1	0	8	194	367	−173	6
10	Falcons	9	1	0	8	144	324	−180	5
Final standings.

Legend and competition rules
Legend:
Qualify to the semi-finals.	P = Games played, W = Games won, D = Games drawn, L = Games lost, PF = Points for, PA = Points against, PD = Points difference, TF = Tries for, TA = Tries against, TB = Try bonus points, LB = Losing bonus points, Pts = Log points
Competition rules:
Qualification: The top four teams qualified to the semi-finals.
Points breakdown: * 4 points for a win * 2 points for a draw * 1 bonus point for a loss by seven points or less * 1 bonus point for scoring four or more tries in a match

The following fixtures were played in the 1997 Bankfin Nite Series:

1997 Bankfin Nite Series
Team	BOL	BDR	FAL	GRF	GRQ	LEO	ELE	PMA	SWD	WPr
Boland Cavaliers	—N/a	—N/a	—N/a	41–17	26–20	—N/a	32–14	—N/a	38–23	—N/a
Border Bulldogs	3–12	—N/a	28–13	—N/a	—N/a	17–35	—N/a	—N/a	—N/a	13–59
Falcons	12–40	—N/a	—N/a	25–32	—N/a	—N/a	19–17	—N/a	—N/a	16–61
Griffons	—N/a	18–28	—N/a	—N/a	22–53	—N/a	—N/a	22–23	19–41	—N/a
Griquas	—N/a	58–17	45–26	—N/a	—N/a	27–13	—N/a	19–27	—N/a	—N/a
Leopards	17–35	—N/a	52–5	29–26	—N/a	—N/a	24–0	—N/a	—N/a	26–47
Mighty Elephants	—N/a	29–10	—N/a	50–17	18–27	—N/a	—N/a	19–20	36–27	—N/a
Pumas	32–57	17–15	19–9	—N/a	—N/a	42–19	—N/a	—N/a	—N/a	17–31
SWD Eagles	—N/a	64–0	30–19	—N/a	23–18	37–24	—N/a	20–22	—N/a	—N/a
Western Province	35–24	—N/a	—N/a	77–21	27–14	—N/a	56–12	—N/a	36–17	—N/a

==== Semi-finals ====
7 May 1997	Western Province	39–13	Griquas

7 May 1997	Boland Cavaliers	28–15	Pumas

==== Final ====
14 May 1997	Western Province	36–25	Boland Cavaliers
