= Wessel Roux =

South African rugby union player

- Born: Wessel Roux; 18 October 1975 (age 51) Bothaville, South Africa
- Height: 1.81 m (5 ft 11 1/2 in)
- Weight: 125 kg (19 st 10 lb)
- School: Bothaville
- University: University of Pretoria
- Notable relative(s): Lizzie Roux (Mother) and Marie Wilkinson (Mother-in-law) and Children Christian Roux and Amy Roux
- Occupation: Rugby Union player

Rugby union career
- Position: Prop
- Current team: None
Senior career
Years	Team	Apps	(Points)
2002–2007	Bulls		
2008	RC Toulonnais		
2009	CS Bourgoin-Jallieu		

Wessel Roux (born 18 October 1975) is a South African international rugby union prop who last played for CS Bourgoin-Jallieu in the Top 14. He has been capped 3 times for South Africa. He has also played for RC Toulonnais in the Top 14 and the Bulls in the Super 14.

Wessel earned over 100 caps with the Bulls.

He is currently the Forwards, Mental and Life Coach at the Fidelity ADT Lions.

== Education ==
He studied at the University of Pretoria where he was a member of Olienhout Men’s Residence.
