= Bulls (rugby union) =

South African rugby union team

(South Africa) Bulls
- Union: Blue Bulls Rugby Union
- Emblem(s): Barberton Daisy, Bull
- Founded: 1938
- Location: Pretoria, South Africa
- Region: Gauteng
- Ground: Loftus Versfeld Stadium (Capacity: 51,762)
- Coach(es): Johan Ackermann (URC, ERCC & CC); Phiwe Nomlomo (CC)
- Captain(s): Marcell Coetzee (URC & ERCC); Nama Xaba (CC)
- Most appearances: Naas Botha (179)
- Top scorer: Naas Botha (2511)
- Most tries: Bryan Habana (37)
- League(s): United Rugby Championship; European Rugby Champions Cup; Currie Cup
- 2025–26 & 2026: URC runners-up South African Shield: 4th 4th overall 2026 CC; 8th overall
1st kit	2nd kit

Official website
- bullsrugby.co.za
- Current season

The Bulls (known for sponsorship reasons as the Vodacom Bulls) are a South African professional rugby union team based in Pretoria. They play their home matches at Loftus Versfeld. They compete in the domestic Currie Cup competition (as the Blue Bulls) and in the United Rugby Championship. They also competed in Super Rugby until 2020.

The side won the Super 14 in 2007, 2009 and 2010, placing them among the most successful teams in Super Rugby history with three titles. They were the most successful team of the Super 14 era (2006–10), winning three out of the five titles. They are the only South African team to win a Super Rugby title.

Formerly known as Northern Transvaal, the side has competed in the Currie Cup since 1937 before becoming the Bulls in 1997.

== History ==
=== Northern Transvaal ===
The team as it is known today has its beginnings in 1938 when the then Northern Transvaal Rugby Union broke away from the Transvaal Rugby Football Union to gain status as an independent rugby union. The new team was named Northern Transvaal and donned light blue jerseys with a red Barberton Daisy emblem. However, in their very first match, they played in the red and gold hooped jerseys of the Pretoria Combined team that often "locked horns" with teams touring South Africa (red and gold being the colors of Pretoria).

=== Lion Cup ===
Northern Transvaal participated in the Lion Cup between 1983 and 1994. The Lion Cup was a domestic rugby union knock-out competition held in South Africa. Northern Transvaal tasted success in the competition on three occasions, winning the competition in 1985, 1990 and 1991. They also finished as runners-up three times in 1987, 1988 and 1989. Northern Transvaal claimed the Lion Cup 62–6 against Natal in 1991, which is one of the biggest victories ever in a final.

=== Currie Cup / Central Series ===
The Northern Transvaal rugby team participated in the Currie Cup / Central Series from 1986 to 1994. The competition saw the top Currie Cup teams play the Currie Cup Central A teams, with the Currie Cup team with the best playing record awarded the Percy Frames Trophy. Western Province was the most successful team, with Northern Transvaal also doing well, claiming six consecutive titles between 1987 and 1992.

=== Early franchise history ===
Prior to the professional Super Rugby competition, Northern Transvaal competed in the Super 10, which was a tournament featuring ten teams from Australia, New Zealand, South Africa, Tonga and Western Samoa, which ran from 1993 to 1995. The top three teams from the previous Currie Cup season qualified for each of the Super 10 tournaments.

Northern Transvaal competed in the 1993 season, where they were grouped in Pool B alongside Transvaal, New South Wales, North Harbour and Waikato. Transvaal finished at the top of the pool, with Northern Transvaal finishing third, behind New South Wales. Northern Transvaal did not qualify for the 1994 or 1995 seasons.

=== Early professional era (1996–2005) ===
After rugby union went professional, the Super 10 tournament was restructured. The Super 12 was created, and was to be competed by teams from Australia, New Zealand and South Africa. Both Australia and New Zealand adopted new franchise models for their teams, whereas South Africa chose to use the Currie Cup to decide what teams were to be promoted in the Super 12 each season.

Competing in the inaugural Super 12 season of 1996, Northern Transvaal were one of the 12 teams. The side won eight of their 11 games and finished third on the table – behind only Auckland and Queensland. Jannie Kruger finished the season in the top three leading point-scorers, behind only Matt Burke and John Eales. The side was, however, soundly defeated in a semi-final by the Auckland Blues, with the final score being 48 points to 11. The game was played at Eden Park in Auckland.

After their fairly successful performance in the opening competition, the subsequent competition of 1997 saw them with three wins and three draws from 11 games. They finished at eighth. Following the 1997 season, South Africa adopted a similar franchise system to that of Australia and New Zealand's, abolishing the Currie Cup promotion system in favour of creating new franchises. The Bulls were formed as one of the four new teams. They did not make the semis in the 1998 season. The Bulls were considered one of the worst teams in the Super 12 competition, finishing last or second to last for five consecutive seasons from 1998 to 2003. In 2002, they became the first team ever to go through an entire Super Rugby season without winning a single game. This record remained until the Lions repeated the feat during the 2010 season. After finishing fourth in the inaugural competition, they did not make the semis again until the years 2003.

The Bulls finished in 6th place in both 2003 and 2004, though still missing out on a finals position. They equalled there 1996 performance in 2005, although there was a very poor start to the season, it was followed by six straight wins to earn them a semi-final berth, where they were defeated by the New South Wales Waratahs. Bryan Habana finished in the top three try-scorers by the end of the season, and was short-listed for IRB player of the year.

=== Super 14 era (2006–10) ===
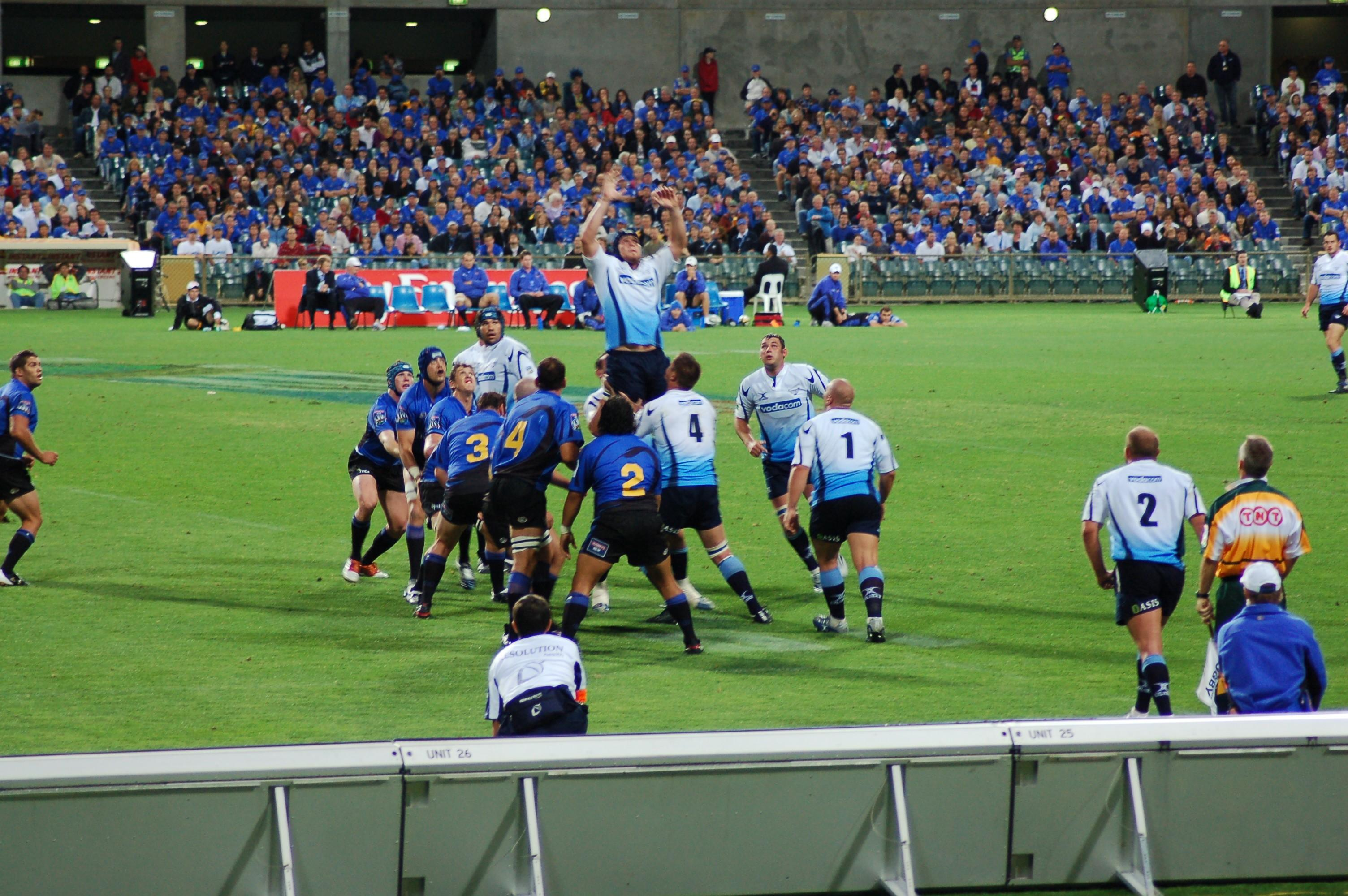
The Bulls playing the Western Force in Perth, Australia in 2006

In 2006, the Super 12 became the Super 14, with the addition of two new franchises, the Cheetahs and the Western Force. By the last round of the 2006 season, the Bulls, along with the Brumbies and Sharks were all in contention to take the fourth and final position on the ladder to make the semi-finals. After the Brumbies were defeated 33 to 3 by the Crusaders, the Bulls or Sharks could mathematically take the fourth spot. The Bulls defeated the Stormers at Newlands in Cape Town 43 points to 10, which ensured they went through to the semi-finals. The Bulls travelled to Christchurch where they were defeated 35 to 15 at Jade Stadium and knocked out of the finals.

The Bulls lost their first game of the 2007 Super 14 season, going down to the Sharks in Durban 17 points to 3. Entering week 14, the last round of the regular season, the Bulls were chasing an unlikely 72-point win over the Queensland Reds in order to move into second place and get a home semi-final. At Loftus, the Bulls defeated the Reds 92 points to 3, with the 89-point margin of victory setting a new Super rugby record. The Bulls ran in 13 tries with four players getting doubles and Derick Hougaard kicking 11 conversions. The Sharks finished first, so it became the first time that both home venues in the semi-finals was in South Africa.

The Bulls defeated the Crusaders in their semi-final by 27 points to 12, with Derick Hougaard kicking eight penalties and a drop-goal. The Sharks ensured a home-final in the 2007 Super 14-competition by defeating the Blues with a scoreline of 34–18.

When the Bulls met the Sharks in the Super 14 final at the Absa Stadium in Durban the match turned out to be a tight, nervous affair with the Bulls initially being guilty of indiscipline and making a lot of mistakes. The Sharks carried a 14–10 advantage into half-time after a JP Pietersen try cancelled out one from Pierre Spies. The second half of the match was just as nail-biting, with the Bulls gaining the ascendancy in the match, but failing to turn their rising amount of possession into points. A Derick Hougaard penalty closed the gap to 14–13, after which the Bulls made several onslaughts on the Sharks line, only to lose the ball at critical stages. Their match looked to be all but over for the Bulls when Albert van den Berg barged over the line for a Sharks try two minutes from full-time to stretch their lead to six points. However, François Steyn failed with the conversion attempt, and the Bulls restarted with barely seconds on the clock. After regaining the ball from the kick-off, play went through several phases before Bryan Habana received the ball on the right wing. He cut infield and scored the most dramatic of match winning tries, more than a minute after official play. The try was converted by Derick Hougaard and the Bulls won the match 20–19. In 2009 the Bulls again won the Super 14, defeating the Chiefs 61 – 17 in the final in Pretoria.

In 2010 the Bulls again finished top of the log by beating the Crusaders in a home semi final to secure a home final. Because the FIFA World Cup was being hosted by South Africa that year and Loftus was included as a venue, they had to play the semi and final in Soweto, a first in Super Rugby history. The Stormers had beaten the Waratahs at home and would face off with the Bulls in the final. The Bulls won the final once again in dramatic style when Francois Hougaard sidestepped the Stormers fullback Joe Petersen to score an impressive try.

=== Super Rugby era (2011–2020) ===
The Bulls only managed the Super Rugby South African Conference trophy in 2013 and they were three time conference runner-up in 2012, 2014 and 2019. They also reached the qualifiers twice and semi-final once, but lost all three play-off matches.

After the 2020 Super Rugby season was cancelled due to the COVID-19 pandemic, a replacement tournament was announced for each country. The South African tournament was called Super Rugby Unlocked and the Bulls were crowned the champions after ending top of the log.

The South African teams withdrew from the competition entirely, making the Bulls the only South African winners of any form of the Super Rugby trophy.

=== Pro14 and United Rugby Championship era (2021–present) ===
The Pro14 Rainbow Cup was announced as an end-of-season cup competition to introduce the South African teams after their withdrawal from Super Rugby. After the regular season the top of the South African log Bulls faced European top Benetton in the final in Italy. The Bulls lost their first match in Europe as well as the Pro14 Rainbow Cup final 35–8.

The 2021–22 season was a tough start for the Bulls with two straight losses in Europe against Leinster 31-3 and Connacht 34–7. The Bulls got their first win in Europe on 9 October 2021 beating Cardiff Blues 29–19.

They went on to finish in 4th place on the overall standings after regular season, securing a home quarter-final.

== Rivalries ==
Through the years the rivalry between the Blue Bulls and Western Province grew, and a clash between these two sides became one of the Currie Cup's biggest rivalries. The first time that the two sides met in a Currie Cup final was in 1946, which was also Northern Transvaal's first final contest. The match was played at Northern Transvaal's home ground at Loftus Versfeld, and saw Western Province go down 11 to 9.

After meeting in numerous other finals following 1946, it was not until the 1982 season, when Western Province defeated Northern Transvaal in a Currie Cup final. In the 1980s the two sides met in six Currie Cup finals, with Western Province winning three of them and one being drawn. One of the most recent Currie Cup seasons when both sides made it to the final was the 1998 season: The Blue Bulls beat the Western Province by four points, 24 to 20, at Loftus Versfeld.

== Location ==
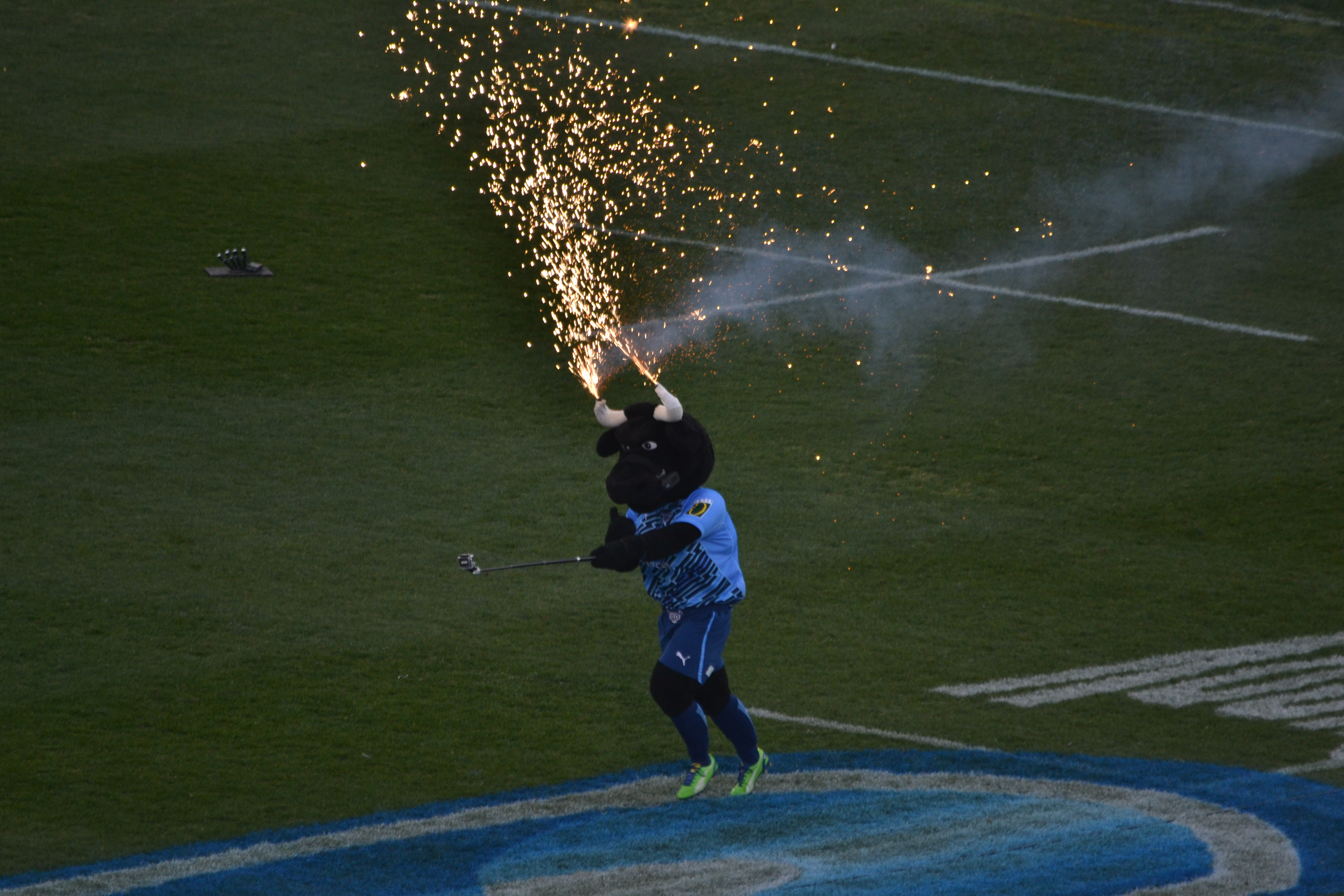
Bulletjie, the Blue Bulls mascot

The team is centred around the Blue Bulls Rugby Union, whose catchment covers Pretoria as well as Limpopo province, but also draws players from the Falcons Rugby Union, who represent the East Rand. Through 2005, the Bulls also drew players from the Pumas Rugby Union and Leopards Rugby Union, but in the realignment of franchise areas that came from the expansion of Super 12 to Super 14, these unions were moved into the Lions.

== Stadium ==
The Bulls play all their home matches at the Loftus Versfeld stadium in Pretoria, which is also the home of the Blue Bulls during the Currie Cup season. The stadium is also a regular host for Springboks Test matches, and was a venue during the 1995 Rugby World Cup which South Africa hosted. Loftus was a venue for Pool D matches including France v Tonga, Scotland v Tonga and France v Scotland. Loftus was also used twice during the finals stages – for the New Zealand v Scotland quarter-final and the England v France third place play-off.

The ground has been used for rugby since 1908, and in 1932 the stadium was renamed to Loftus Versfeld in honor of Robert Owen Loftus Versfeld, the founder of organized rugby in Pretoria. The stadium has undergone numerous renovations over the years, and is currently capable of holding 51,762 spectators.

== Primary sponsor ==
Since 2005, the team's main sponsor has been mobile communications company Vodacom. On the team's website and all team-issued press releases, the Bulls are referred to as the Vodacom Bulls.

== Current squad ==
The Bulls squad for the 2026–27 United Rugby Championship is:

2026–27 Bulls squad
**Props**: (South Africa) Jean Erasmus; (South Africa) Francois Klopper; (South Africa) Khutha Mchunu; (South Africa) Mawande Mdanda; (South Africa) Mornay Smith; (South Africa) **Gerhard Steenekamp**; (South Africa) Sti Sithole; (South Africa) Dylan Smith; (South Africa) Alulutho Tshakweni; (South Africa) Hencus van Wyk (Note: Named in Champions Cup squad, having signed from Stormers in loan, in October 2026.); (South Africa) **Jan-Hendrik Wessels**; **Hookers**: (South Africa) Juann Else; (South Africa) **Johan Grobbelaar**; (South Africa) Jon Hobson (Note: Named in touring squad in September 2026.); (South Africa) Janco Uys; (South Africa) **Akker van der Merwe**; Malcolm Marx **Locks**: (South Africa) Jaco Grobbelaar; (South Africa) **Nico Janse van Rensburg**; (South Africa) Reinhardt Ludwig; (South Africa) Heinrich Theron; (South Africa) JF van Heerden; (South Africa) Ruan Vermaak; (South Africa) **Cobus Wiese**	**Back row**: (South Africa) **Nizaam Carr**; (South Africa) **Marcell Coetzee** **(c)**; (South Africa) Mpilo Gumede; (South Africa) **Cameron Hanekom**; (South Africa) Hanro Liebenberg; (South Africa) **Elrigh Louw**; (South Africa) Jeandré Rudolph; (South Africa) **Kwagga Smith** (Note: Signed from Shizuoka Blue Revs in October 2026.); (South Africa) JJ Theron; (South Africa) **Marco van Staden**; (South Africa) Nama Xaba; **Scrum-halves**: (South Africa) Zak Burger; (South Africa) Paul de Wet; (South Africa) Keagan Johannes; (South Africa) Neil le Roux; (South Africa) **Embrose Papier**; **Fly-halves**: (South Africa) **Curwin Bosch**; (South Africa) Luan Giliomee; (South Africa) Viaan Mentoor (Note: Named in touring squad in September 2026.); (South Africa) **Handré Pollard**	**Centres**: (South Africa) Demitre Erasmus; (South Africa) Stedman Gans; (South Africa) Katlego Letebele; (South Africa) Pieter van der Merwe (Note: Named in Champions Cup squad in October 2026.); (South Africa) Harold Vorster; (South Africa) Sango Xamlashe; (South Africa) Mnombo Zwelendaba (Note: Signed on loan from the Griquas in October 2026.); **Wings**: (South Africa) Thaakir Abrahams; (South Africa) Riyaad Bam; (South Africa) Sebastian de Klerk; (South Africa) Stravino Jacobs; (South Africa) Cheswill Jooste; (South Africa) Dylan Maart; (South Africa) **Canan Moodie**; (South Africa) Sergeal Petersen; **Fullbacks**: (South Africa) Hakeem Kunene; (South Africa) **Willie le Roux**; (South Africa) Devon Williams
**(c)** denotes the team captain. **Bold** denotes internationally capped players. * denotes players qualified to play for South Africa on residency or dual nationality. Source:

The following players have been included so far in the Bulls XV squad for the 2026 Currie Cup Premier Division:

2026 Bulls XV Currie Cup squad
**Props**: (South Africa) Damian Baker; (South Africa) Dian Coetzee; (South Africa) Jean Erasmus; (South Africa) Ranon Fouché; (South Africa) Arno Gustafson; (South Africa) Mawande Mdanda; (South Africa) Sandisiwe Msengana; (South Africa) Duwan Potgieter (Note: Addition for 2026 Currie Cup); (South Africa) Dylan Smith; **Hookers**: (South Africa) Jon Hobson; (South Africa) Esethu Mnebelele; (South Africa) Juandre Schoeman; (South Africa) Shaun Schurmann; **Locks**: (South Africa) Jonathan Eloff; (South Africa) **Nico Janse van Rensburg**; (South Africa) Sintu Manjezi; (South Africa) Jacques Swarts (Note: Addition for 2026 Currie Cup); (South Africa) Heinrich Theron; (South Africa) Migael Turner; (South Africa) Abri van der Westhuizen; (South Africa) Ulrich van der Westhuizen	**Back row**: (South Africa) Chinedu Amadi; (South Africa) Thomas Beling; (South Africa) **Nizaam Carr** (Note: Addition for 2026 Currie Cup); (South Africa) Oelof de Meyer; (South Africa) Mpilo Gumede (Note: Addition for 2026 Currie Cup); (South Africa) KB Maake; (South Africa) Abongile Nonkontwana; (South Africa) Junior Pokomela; (South Africa) Dieter Schubert; (South Africa) JJ Theron; (South Africa) Cephas van Biljon; (South Africa) Nama Xaba **(c)**; **Scrum-halves**: (South Africa) Neil le Roux; (South Africa) Brooklyn Newman; (South Africa) Hendré Schoeman; (South Africa) Melt Viljoen; **Fly-halves**: (South Africa) Ruben Groenewald; (South Africa) Keagan Johannes; (South Africa) Viaan Mentoor; (South Africa) Unathi Mlotshwa; (South Africa) Ian van der Merwe	**Centres**: (South Africa) Demitre Erasmus; (South Africa) Marnus Rademeyer; (South Africa) Riwan van Aswegen; (South Africa) Daniel van der Merwe; (South Africa) Pieter van der Merwe; (South Africa) PA van Niekerk; (South Africa) Christiaan Vlok; (South Africa) Christian Vorster; **Wings**: (South Africa) Riyaad Bam; (South Africa) Ruan Enslin; (South Africa) Lindsey Jansen; (South Africa) JJ Motlhodi; (South Africa) Lavela Pongolo (Note: Addition for 2026 Currie Cup); **Fullbacks**: (South Africa) Aka Boqwana; (South Africa) Hakeem Kunene; (South Africa) Devon Williams
**(c)** denotes the team captain. **Bold** denotes internationally capped players. * denotes players qualified to play for South Africa on residency or dual nationality. Source:

== Coaches ==
Currie Cup, Lion Cup, Percy Frames Trophy

- 1968–1981: Brig. Buurman Van Zyl (11 Currie Cup titles)
- 1982–1984: Dr. Ernst Dinkelmann
- 1985: Genl.Maj. Bert Wandrag (1 Lion Cup title)
- 1986–1989: Dr John Williams (3 Currie Cup titles; 3 Percy Frames Trophy titles)
- 1990–1993: Eugene Van Wyk (1 Currie Cup Title; 2 Lion Cup titles; 3 Percy Frames Trophy titles)
- 1994–1997: Dr John Williams
- 1998–2000: Eugene Van Wyk (1 Currie Cup title)
- 2001–2005: Heyneke Meyer (3 Currie Cup titles)
- 2006–2007: Pote Human (1 Currie Cup title)
- 2008–2010: Frans Ludeke (1 Currie Cup title)
- 2011–2013: Pine Pienaar
- 2014: Frans Ludeke
- 2015–2017: Nollis Marais
- 2018: John Mitchell
- 2019: Pote Human
- 2020–2021: Jake White (2 Currie Cup titles)
- 2022: Gert Smal
- 2023: Edgar Marutlulle
- 2024–present: Phiwe Nomlomo

Super Rugby

- 1996: Dr John Williams
- 1997: Kitch Christie
- 1998–1999: Eugene van Wyk
- 2000: Heyneke Meyer
- 2001: Phil Pretorius
- 2002: Heyneke Meyer
- 2003: Rudi Joubert
- 2004–2007: Heyneke Meyer (1 Super Rugby title)
- 2008–2015: Frans Ludeke (2 Super Rugby titles); (1 Super Rugby Conference trophy)
- 2016–2017: Nollis Marais
- 2018: John Mitchell
- 2019: Pote Human
- 2020: Jake White (1 Super Rugby Unlocked title)

URC

- 2020–2025: Jake White (1 United Rugby Championship SA Shield)
- 2026–present: Johan Ackerman

== Captains ==
- 1996–97: Ruben Kruger
- 1998: Adriaan Richter
- 1999: Schutte Bekker
- 2000: Ruben Kruger
- 2001: Joost van der Westhuizen
- 2002: Chris le Roux
- 2003: Joost van der Westhuizen
- 2004: Victor Matfield
- 2005: Anton Leonard
- 2006–07: Victor Matfield
- 2008: Fourie du Preez
- 2009–11: Victor Matfield
- 2012–13: Pierre Spies
- 2014: Flip van der Merwe & Victor Matfield
- 2015: Victor Matfield
- 2016: Adriaan Strauss
- 2017: Handré Pollard
- 2018: Burger Odendaal
- 2019: Lood de Jager
- 2020: Burger Odendaal and Trevor Nyakane
- 2020–21: Duane Vermeulen
- 2021–present: Marcell Coetzee

== Statistics ==
=== Overall results by opponent in all competitions ===
Complete results for the Bulls vs different opponents in all competitions:

Super Rugby, Super Rugby Unlocked, Preparation Series, Pro14 Rainbow Cup, United Rugby Championship, European Rugby Champions Cup, EPCR Challenge Cup, Toyota Challenge
Opposition	Span	Played	Won	Drawn	Lost	Win%	Points for	PPM	Aga	Best score	Worst score	40–49 points	50+ points
(South Africa) Sharks	1996–2026	49	29	3	17	59.18%	1159	23.65	1054	44–10 (2023–24) URC	47–20 (2022–23) URC	7	0
(Australia) Waratahs	1996–2019	22	12	0	10	54.55%	506	23.00	609	48–38 (2010) Super Rugby	53–7 (2001) Super Rugby	1	0
(New Zealand) Highlanders	1996–2020	23	7	2	14	30.43%	568	24.70	644	59–29 (1996) Super Rugby	65–23 (1999) Super Rugby	2	2
(Australia) Reds	1996–2020	23	10	0	13	43.48%	614	26.70	521	92–3 (2007) Super Rugby	48–12 (2002) Super Rugby	2	2
(New Zealand) Crusaders	1996–2019	27	10	0	17	37.04%	626	23.19	909	40–35 (2010) Super Rugby	75–27 (2000) Super Rugby	1	0
(New Zealand) Blues	1996–2020	23	7	2	14	30.43%	588	25.57	759	59–26 (2009) Super Rugby	65–24 (2002) Super Rugby	2	1
(New Zealand) Chiefs	1996–2019	23	8	2	13	34.78%	636	27.65	745	61–17 (2009) Super Rugby Final	53–24 (2002) Super Rugby	1	1
(South Africa) Lions	1996–2026	41	26	1	14	63.41%	1208	29.46	1048	62–52 (2004) Super Rugby	57–24 (1999) Super Rugby	2	3
(New Zealand) Hurricanes	1996–2019	22	10	0	12	45.45%	567	25.77	602	48–14 (2013) Super Rugby	64–32 (1997) Super Rugby	4	0
(Australia) Brumbies	1996–2019	23	8	0	15	34.78%	568	24.70	672	50–32 (2010) Super Rugby	73–9 (1999) Super Rugby	1	1
(South Africa) Stormers	1996–2026	49	18	1	30	36.73%	1113	22.71	1093	75–14 (2005) Super Rugby	42–19 (1999) Super Rugby	4	1
(South Africa) Cheetahs	1997–2022	22	16	0	6	72.73%	669	30.41	496	60–20 (2008) Super Rugby	42–29 (2015) Super Rugby	2	3
(Australia) Force	2006–2016	10	6	0	4	60.00%	264	26.40	221	42–20 (2016) Super Rugby	30–27 (2007) Super Rugby	1	0
(Australia) Rebels	2011–2019	7	6	0	1	85.71%	253	36.14	125	47–10 (2011) Super Rugby	35–41 (2012) Super Rugby	4	0
(South Africa) Southern Kings	2013–2017	4	3	0	1	75.00%	150	37.50	55	48–18 (2013) Super Rugby	31–30 (2017) Super Rugby	1	0
(Japan) Sunwolves	2016–2018	5	3	0	2	60.00%	171	34.20	114	50–3 (2016) Super Rugby	42–37 (2018) Super Rugby	0	1
(Argentina) Jaguares	2016–2020	7	2	0	5	28.57%	160	22.86	218	43–34 (2018) Super Rugby	54–25 (2018) Super Rugby	1	0
(South Africa) Griquas	2020–2020	1	1	0	0	100.00%	30	30.00	23	30–23 (2020) Super Rugby Unlocked	23–30 (2020) Super Rugby Unlocked	0	0
(South Africa) Pumas	2020–2021	2	2	0	0	100.00%	69	34.50	36	48–31 (2020) Preparation Series	31–48 (2020) Preparation Series	1	0
(South Africa) Eastern Province Elephants	2021–2021	1	1	0	0	100.00%	87	87.00	10	87–10 (2021) Preparation Series	10–87 (2021) Preparation Series	0	1
(Italy) Benetton	2021–2026	7	6	0	1	85.71%	246	35.14	178	56–35 (2023–24) URC	35–8 (2021) Rainbow Cup Final	3	1
(Ireland) Leinster	2021–2026	9	5	0	4	55.56%	205	22.71	250	62–7 (2022–23) URC	47–14 (2023–24) URC	0	1
(Ireland) Connacht	2021–2025	5	4	0	1	80.00%	144	28.80	116	53–27 (2023–24) URC	34–7 (2021–22) URC	0	1
(Wales) Cardiff	2021–2026	5	5	0	0	100.00%	177	35.40	68	45–9 (2022–23) URC	21–45 (2024–25) URC	3	0
(Scotland) Edinburgh	2021–2026	7	4	0	3	57.14%	177	25.29	179	42–33 (2024–25) URC	34–28 (2024–25) URC	1	0
(Italy) Zebre Parma	2022–2026	5	5	0	0	100.00%	294	58.80	91	78–12 (2022–23) URC	29–54 (2023–24) URC	1	4
(Ireland) Munster	2022–2026	6	4	0	2	66.67%	163	27.17	140	45–14 (2025–26) URC QF	31–17 (2022–23) URC	1	0
(Wales) Scarlets	2022–2026	5	3	0	2	60.00%	193	38.60	114	63–21 (2023–24) URC	37–28 (2022–23) URC	0	2
(Wales) Dragons	2022–2026	5	5	0	0	100.00%	217	43.40	66	55–15 (2024–25) URC	20–55 (2021–22) URC	1	2
(Ireland) Ulster	2022–2025	5	2	0	3	40.00%	130	26.00	123	47–21 (2024–25) URC	32–23 (2022–23) URC	1	0
(Scotland) Glasgow Warriors	2022–2026	8	4	0	4	50.00%	187	23.38	193	40–34 (2024–25) URC	35–21 (2022–23) URC	1	0
(Wales) Ospreys	2022–2025	5	5	0	0	100.00%	224	44.80	140	61–24 (2023–24) URC	40–53 (2025–26) URC	1	2
(France) Lyon	2022–2024	4	2	0	2	50.00%	136	34.00	115	59–19 (2023–24) Champions Cup	36–42 (2022–23) Champions Cup	1	1
(England) Exeter Chiefs	2022–2023	2	1	0	1	50.00%	53	26.50	72	39–28 (2022–23) Champions Cup	44–14 (2022–23) Champions Cup	0	0
(France) Toulouse	2023–2023	1	0	0	1	0.00%	9	9.00	33	9–33 (2022–23) Champions Cup	33–9 (2022–23) Champions Cup	0	0
(England) Saracens	2023–2024	2	1	0	1	50.00%	32	16.00	43	27–16 (2023–24) Champions Cup	27–5 (2024–25) Champions Cup	0	0
(England) Bristol Bears	2024–2026	2	1	0	1	50.00%	80	40	78	49–61 (2025–26) Champions Cup	61–49 (2025–26) Champions Cup	1	0
(France) Bordeaux	2024–2025	2	1	0	1	50.00%	79	39.50	86	46–40 (2023–24) Champions Cup	46–33 (2025–26) Champions Cup	1	0
(England) Northampton Saints	2024–2025	3	0	0	3	0.00%	48	16.00	139	22–59 (2023–24) Champions Cup	59–22 (2022–23) Champions Cup	0	0
(France) Castres	2025–2025	1	0	0	1	0.00%	10	10.00	49	10–49 (2024–25)	49–10 (2024–25)	0	0
(France) Stade Français	2025–2025	1	1	0	0	100.00%	48	48.00	7	48–7 (2024–25)	7–48 (2024–25)	1	0
(France) Bayonne	2025–2025	1	1	0	0	100.00%	32	32.00	22	32–22 (2024–25)	22–32 (2024–25)	0	0
(France) Pau	2026-2026	1	1	0	0	100.00%	26	26.00	24	26–24 (2025–26) Champions Cup	24–25 (2025–26) Champions Cup	0	0
Super Rugby	1996–2020	335	158	11	166	47.16%	8626	25.75	8875	92–3 vs Reds (2007)	75–27 vs Crusaders (2000)	30	14
Super Rugby Unlocked	2020–2020	6	5	0	1	83.33%	178	29.67	92	41–14 vs Sharks (2021)	25–30 vs Lions (2021)	1	0
Preparation Series	2021–2021	4	3	0	1	75.00%	181	45.25	115	87–10 vs Eastern Province Elephants (2021)	45–12 vs Sharks (2021)	1	1
United Rugby Championship	2021–2025	80	52	0	28	65.00%	2484	31.05	1825	78–12 vs Zebre (2022–23)	47–14 vs Leinster (2023–24)	12	11
Pro14 Rainbow Cup	2021–2021	7	5	0	2	71.43%	191	27.29	152	43–9 vs Sharks (2021)	35–8 vs Benetton (2021)	1	0
European Rugby Champions Cup	2022–2025	15	7	0	8	46.67%	408	27.20	465	59–19 vs Lyon (2023–24)	59–22 vs Northampton Saints (2023–24)	3	1
EPCR Challenge Cup	2025–2025	2	1	0	1	50.00%	60	30.00	56	32–22 vs Bayonne (2024–25)	34–28 vs Edinburgh (2024–25)	0	0
Toyota Challenge	2022–2022	1	0	0	1	0.00%	14	14.00	17	14–17 vs Cheetahs (2022)	17–14 vs Cheetahs (2022)	0	0
Overall	1996–2026	476	246	11	208	51.68%	12916	27.13	12280	92–3 vs Reds (2007)	75–27 vs Crusaders (2000)	54	30

- All these stats include playoff matches (qualifiers, semi-finals and finals).
- All Super Rugby fixtures vs different opponents as Northern Transvaal 1996–1997 as Bulls 1998–2020 included
- All 2020 Super Rugby Unlocked fixtures included
- All 2021 Preparation Series fixtures included
- 2021 Pro14 Rainbow Cup included
- 2022 Toyota Challenge included
- United Rugby Championship fixtures added 2021–22 – 2025–26
- European Rugby Champions Cup included 2022–23 – 2025–26
- Correct as of 14 November 2026

=== Results by opposition in the Currie Cup ===
Currie Cup
Opposition	Span	Played	Won	Drawn	Lost	Win%	Points for	PPM	Aga	Best score	Worst score	40-49 points	50+ points
Western Province	1996–2025	58	29	2	27	50.00%	1623	27.98	1575	64–29 (2003)	63–26 (2003)	8	3
Free State Cheetahs	1996–2025	55	29	4	22	52.73%	1544	28.07	1483	64–36 (2017)	57–27 (1997)	4	4
Golden Lions	1996–2025	49	28	0	21	57.14%	1420	28.98	1343	54–22 (2017)	62–23 (2013)	6	3
Griquas	1996–2025	47	36	0	11	76.60%	1887	40.15	1193	77–30 (2001)	58–37 (2000)	18	10
Boland Cavaliers	1996–2025	14	12	0	2	85.71%	644	46.00	281	72–16 (2009)	35–26 (2016) Qualification	2	7
Falcons	1996–2016	17	14	1	2	82.35%	673	39.59	316	80–22 (1996)	36–33 (2000) Bankfin Cup	4	4
SWD Eagles	1996–2016	14	13	0	1	92.86%	709	50.64	255	147–8 (1996)	32–36 (1999)	2	5
Griffons	1996–2024	11	9	0	2	81.82%	559	50.82	248	89–31 (1999)	37–43 (2000) Bankfin Cup	1	7
Sharks	1997–2025	51	18	2	31	35.29%	1260	24.71	1283	64–0 (2025)	39–27 (2011)	7	2
Pumas	1997–2025	33	26	0	7	78.79%	1111	33.67	787	66–3 (2006)	63–15 (2023)	6	4
Eastern Province	1997–2016	12	10	0	2	83.33%	503	41.92	325	69–28 (2005) Qualification	50–48 (2002)	5	2
Leopards	1997–2016	15	14	0	1	93.33%	737	49.13	356	92–21 (2011)	51–26 (2016) Qualification	3	6
Border Bulldogs	1997–2016	6	4	0	2	66.67%	235	39.17	131	59–21 (1998)	26–23 (2000)	1	2
Welwitschias	2016–2016	1	1	0	0	100.00%	95	95.00	12	95–12 (2016) Qualification	12–95 (2016) Qualification	0	1
Overall	1996–2025	383	243	9	131	63.45%	13000	33.94	9588	147–8 SWD Eagles (1996)	63–15 Pumas (2023)	67	60

- This data include all playoff matches (quarterfinals, semi-finals and finals).
- 2000, 2001, 2002, 2005 and 2016 Currie Cup qualification results included.
- 2000 Bankfin Cup results included.
- Correct as of 7 December 2025

=== Bulls XV ===
The Blue Bulls Vodacom Cup and SuperSport Rugby Challenge results vs different opponents 1998-2019] are as follows.

Added together based on the fact that both competitions serves as the second tier in South African rugby. In some of these fixtures, the Blue Bulls were represented by the Blue Bulls XV.

Vodacom Cup and Rugby Challenge
Opposition	Span	Played	Won	Drawn	Lost	Win%	Points for	PPM	Aga	Best score	Worst score	40-49 points	50+ points
Golden Lions XV	1998–2019	28	13	0	15	46.43%	827	29.54	872	62–24 (2019)	63–27 (2002)	3	4
Leopards	1998–2019	23	18	1	4	78.26%	805	35.00	566	63–36 (2019)	41–45 (1999)	6	2
Pumas	1998–2019	22	9	1	12	40.91%	613	27.86	635	49–16 (2005)	51–22 (1999)	3	0
Falcons	1998–2019	21	16	0	5	76.19%	823	39.19	462	74–14 (2013)	39–21 (2002)	2	6
Griquas	1998–2019	19	9	0	10	47.37%	542	28.53	550	52–20 (2002)	40–25 (2000)	6	1
Griffons	1998–2019	15	14	0	1	93.33%	631	42.07	299	89–10 (2013)	36–25 (1999)	3	4
Sharks	1998–2017	11	7	0	4	63.64%	316	28.73	258	51–18 (2004)	57–27 (1998)	1	1
Welwitschias	1999–2019	10	10	0	0	100.00%	625	62.50	203	92–7 (2017)	34–58 (2010)	2	7
Western Province	2000–2017	11	6	0	5	54.55%	328	29.82	238	60–33 (2002)	37–35 (2008)	2	1
Boland Cavaliers	2001–2011	9	7	0	2	77.78%	344	38.22	262	50–29 (2002)	45–47 (2002)	4	1
Free State Cheetahs	2001–2015	14	13	0	1	92.85%	526	37.57	382	68–22 (2008)	50–23 (2004)	5	1
Border Bulldogs	2001–2011	7	5	0	2	71.43%	259	37.00	125	52–12 (2001)	33–26 (2005)	0	2
SWD Eagles	2001–2011	5	3	0	2	60.00%	154	30.80	134	46–31 (2002)	33–27 (2008)	1	0
Eastern Province Kings	2006–2013	4	3	0	1	75.00%	138	34.50	117	43–22 (2006)	34–31 (2013)	1	0
Pampas XV	2011–2011	2	0	0	2	0.00%	31	15.50	41	22–27 (2011)	27–22 (2011)	0	0
Limpopo Blue Bulls	2013–2015	3	3	0	0	100.00%	307	102.33	13	114–0 (2014)	13–83 (2015)	0	3
Overall	1998–2019	204	136	2	66	66.67%	7269	35.63	5157	114–0 vs Limpopo Blue Bulls Vodacom Cup 2014	63–27 Vs Golden Lions (2002)	39	33

- Fixtures as the Blue Bulls XV included.
- This data include all playoff matches (quarterfinals, semi-finals and finals)
- All fixtures added 1998 - 2019

Other notable results:

Date	Opponent	Location	Result	Bulls score	Opponent score	Notes
1 February 2001	Fiji Developmental side	Fiji	Lost	27	35	Report
3 February 2001	Fiji	Fiji	Won	33	19	Report
7 February 2001	Fiji Warriors	Fiji	Won	19	14	Report
31 January 2015	(England) Saracens	Allianz Park, London	Won	39	26	Report
17 July 2021	South Africa A	Cape Town Stadium, Cape Town	Won	17	14	Report

== Bulls records ==
=== United Rugby Championship (Rainbow Cup), Champions Cup, EPCR Challenge Cup and Super Rugby records ===
==== Individual records ====
Individual records	United Rugby Championship	Champions Cup	EPCR Challenge Cup	Super Rugby
Most points	388 by Chris Smith	58 by Johan Goosen	15 by David Kriel	1487 by Morné Steyn
Most tries	24 by Kurt-Lee Arendse	4 by David Kriel, Sebastian de Klerk, Marcell Coetzee, Embrose Papier, Cameron Hanekom	3 by David Kriel	37 by Bryan Habana (2005–09) 2nd Akona Ndungane 33 tries (2005–14)
Most conversions	92 by Chris Smith	18 by Johan Goosen	3 by Johan Goosen, Keagan Johannes	245 by Morné Steyn
Most penalty kicks	57 by Chris Smith	8 by Chris Smith	1 by Johan Goosen, Keagan Johannes	283 by Morné Steyn
Most drop goals	1 by Chris Smith	record not set	record not set	26 by Morné Steyn

==== Match records ====
Match records	United Rugby Championship	Champions Cup	EPCR Challenge Cup	Super Rugby
Biggest victory	78–12 (v. Zebre, 2023)	59-19 (v. Lyon, 2024)	32-22 (v. Bayonne, 2025)	92–3 (v. Queensland Reds, 2007)
Largest points for	78 (v. Zebre, 2023)	59 (v. Lyon, 2024)	32 (v. Bayonne, 2025)	92 (v. Queensland Reds, 2007)
Biggest defeat	14–47 (v. Leinster, 2024)	5-50 (v. Northampton Saints, 2025)	34-28 (v. Edinburgh, 2025)	9–73 (v ACT Brumbies, 1999)
Most points conceded	47 (v. Sharks, 2022), (v. Leinster, 2024)	61 (v. Bristol Bears, 2026)	34 (v. Edinburgh, 2025)	75 (v Crusaders, 2000)
Most tries	11 (v. Zebre, 2023)	9 (v. Lyon, 2024)	4 tries on two occasions	13 (v Queensland Reds, 2007)
Most tries conceded	7 (v. Leinster, 2024)	9 (v. Northampton Saints, 2024), (v. Bristol Bears, 2026)	4 (v. Edinburgh, 2025)	11 (v Crusaders, 2000)
Most points by a player	23 by Johan Goosen (v. Zebre 2023)	13 by Chris Smith (v. Lyon, 2023)	10 by David Kriel (v. Edinburgh, 2025)	35 by Morné Steyn (v Stormers, 2005, v Brumbies 2010)
Most tries by a player	3 (hat-trick) by Cornal Hendricks (v. Ospreys, 2022),Canan Moodie (v. Zebre 2023),David Kriel (v. Zebre 2023), Canan Moodie (v. Benetton 2024), Johan Grobbelaar (v. Ospreys, 2025)	2 tries on 6 occasions	2 by David Kriel (v. Edinburgh, 2025)	3 by Adriaan Richter (v. Blues, 1997), Fourie du Preez (v. Cats, 2004), Wynand Olivier (v. Rebels, 2011), Bjorn Basson (v. Rebels, 2016), Warrick Gelant (v. Sharks, 2017), Adriaan Strauss (v. Stormers, 2018), Warrick Gelant (v. Sharks, 2018), Rosko Specman (v. Highlanders, 2020)
Most conversions by a player	10 by Johan Goosen (v. Zebre 2023)	6 by Morné Steyn (v. Lyon, 2022), Handre Pollard (v. Bristol Bears, 2026)	2 on two occasions	11 by Derick Hougaard (v. Queensland Reds, 2007)
Most penalties by a player	5 by Morné Steyn (v. Sharks, 2021), Chris Smith (v. Cardiff 2021), Chris Smith (v. Munster 2022)	3 by Chris Smith (v. Toulouse, 2023), Chris Smith (v. Lyon, 2023), Handre Pollard (v. Glasgow Warriors, 2026)	1 on two occasions	8 by Jannie de Beer (v. Highlanders, 1996), Derick Hougaard (v. Crusaders, 2007)
Most drop goals by a player	1 by Chris Smith (v. Sharks 2022), Keagan Johannes (v. Connacht 2025)	record not set	record not set	4 by Morné Steyn (v. Crusaders, 2009)

==== Winning streaks ====
Winning streaks	United Rugby Championship	Champions Cup	EPCR Challenge Cup	Super Rugby
Most consecutive victories	6 (27 April 2024 – 22 June 2024)	3 victories	1 victory	12 (25 April 2009 – 27 March 2010)

==== Season records ====
Season records	United Rugby Championship	Champions Cup	EPCR Challenge Cup	Super Rugby
Most points	710 (2023–24)	213 (2023–24)	60 (2024-25)	500 (2010)
Most team tries	92 (2023–24)	28 (2023–24)	8 (2024-25)	59 (2018)
Most team conversions	70 (2023–24)	23 (2023–24)	6 (2024-25)	47 (2018)
Most team penalties	36 (2023–24)	9 (2023–24)	2 (2024-25)	62 (2010)
Most team drop goals	1 (2021–22)	record not set	record not set	11 (2009)
Most points by a player	167 by Johan Goosen (2023–24)	41 by Johan Goosen	15 by David Kriel	263 by Morné Steyn (2010 – Super Rugby record)
Most tries by a player	12 by Akker van der Merwe (2023–24)	3 by David Kriel, Marcell Coetzee, Embrose Papier, Sebastian de Klerk (2023–24), Cameron Hanekom (2024-25), Stravino Jacobs (2025-26)	3 by David Kriel	11 by Bjorn Basson (2012)
Most conversions by a player	45 by Johan Goosen (2023–24)	16 by Johan Goosen (2023–24)	3 by Johan Goosen, Keagan Johannes	38 by Morné Steyn (2010)
Most penalty kicks by a player	24 by Johan Goosen (2023–24)	4 by Chris Smith (2022–23)&(2023–24)	1 by Johan Goosen, Keagan Johannes	51 Morné Steyn (2010 – Super Rugby record)
Most drop goals by a player	1 by Chris Smith (2021–22)	record not set	record not set	11 by Morné Steyn (2009, Super Rugby record)

- Correct as of 13 April 2025 (United Rugby Championship not updated with current season yet)
- Pro14 Rainbow Cup also included as URC points.

=== United Rugby Championship ===
Innovation Award

Season	Team
2025–26	Bulls

United Rugby Championship Team of the Year
The following Bulls players were selected in the URC team of the year.

Season	Players
2021–22	Johan Grobbelaar, Ruan Nortjé, Marcell Coetzee
2022–23	Kurt-Lee Arendse
2023–24	Wilco Louw, Akker van der Merwe, Ruan Nortjé (2), Elrigh Louw, Cameron Hanekom, Kurt-Lee Arendse (2)
2024–25	Jan-Hendrik Wessels, Wilco Louw (2), Cameron Hanekom (2)
2025–26	Johan Grobbelaar (2), Cobus Wiese, Embrose Papier

SA Vodacom URC Player of the Season

Season	Players
2025–26	Embrose Papier

United Rugby Championship Golden Boot
The Golden Boot is awarded to the kicker who has successfully converted the highest percentage of place kicks. To be eligible, the player must have taken at least 20 kicks at goal.

Season	Winner	Percentage
2022–23	Johan Goosen	90%
2023–24	Chris Smith	90%

United Rugby Championship Ironman of the Year
The award for having played the most minutes in the URC during the season.

Season	Players
2021–22	Ruan Nortjé (1,394)

United Rugby Championship Next-Gen Player of the Year
The award is to recognize young up and coming talent.

Season	Players
2024–25	Cameron Hanekom

=== All time records ===
Individual records	Held by
Most points	1708 by Morné Steyn (2005 – 2023)
Most tries	37 by Bryan Habana (2005–2009)
Most conversions	309 by Morné Steyn (2005 – 2023)
Most penalty kicks	314 by Morné Steyn (2005 – 2023)
Most drop goals	26 by Morné Steyn (2005 – 2023)

- All 2021 Super Rugby Unlocked points included
- All 2021 Preparation Series points included
- 2021 Pro14 Rainbow Cup points included
- United Rugby Championship points included 2021–22 – 2022–23
- Correct as of 3 June 2023

=== Currie Cup records ===
Bulls Currie Cup records:

Team match records
Record	Opposition	Venue	Season	
Biggest win	SWD Eagles	Polokwane	1996	147–8
Heaviest defeat	Pumas	Pretoria	2023	15–63
Highest score	SWD Eagles	Polokwane	1996	147
Most points conceded	Hurricanes	Yarrow Stadium, New Plymouth	1997	64
Most tries	SWD Eagles	Polokwane	1996	23

Player match records
Record	Player	Opposition	Venue	Season	
Most points by a player	Casper Steyn	SWD Eagles	Pretoria	2000	40
Most tries by a player	Jacques Olivier	SWD Eagles	Polokwane	1996	7
Most conversions by a player	Willie du Plessis	Limpopo Blue Bulls	Lephalale	2013	15
Most Currie Cup conversions by a player	Lance Sherrell	SWD Eagles	Polokwane	1996	14
Most penalties by a player	Jannie Kruger	Western Province	Pretoria	1996	9
Most penalties by a player	Derick Hougaard	Western Province	Pretoria	2002	9
Most drop goals by a player	Naas Botha	Natal	Pretoria	N/A	5

Team season records
Record	Matches	Season	
Most team points	in 28 matches	1996	1193
Most Currie Cup team points	in 13 matches	1996	783
Most team tries	in 28 matches	2004	142

Player season records
Record	Player	Season	
Most points by a player	Casper Steyn	1999	361
Most Currie Cup points by a player	Johan Heunis	1989	268
Most tries by a player	Pierre Spies	1975	25
Most Currie Cup tries by a player	Ettienne Botha	2004	18

Player career records
Record	Player	Seasons	
Most appearances	Burger Geldenhuys	1977–1989	184
Most points	Naas Botha	1977–1992	2511
Most tries	Deon Oosthuysen	1986–1994	85

== Play-off honours ==
=== Finals ===
	Finalists	
2007	Won the Super Rugby final 20–19 against the Sharks	19 May 2007
2009	Won the Super Rugby final 61–17 against the Chiefs	30 May 2009
2010	Won the Super Rugby final 25–17 against the Stormers	29 May 2010
2021	Lost the Pro14 Rainbow Cup final 8–35 against Benetton	19 June 2021
2022	Lost the United Rugby Championship final 13–18 against the Stormers	18 June 2022
2024	Lost the United Rugby Championship final 16–21 against Glasgow	22 June 2024
2025	Lost the United Rugby Championship final 7–32 against Leinster	14 June 2025

=== Semi-finals ===
	Semi-finalists	
1996	Lost Super Rugby semi-final 11–48 to Blues	19 May 1996
2005	Lost Super Rugby semi-final 13–23 to Waratahs	21 May 2005
2006	Lost Super Rugby semi-final 15–35 to Crusaders	20 May 2006
2013	Lost Super Rugby semi-final 23–26 to Brumbies	27 July 2013

=== Quarter-finals ===
	Quarter-finalists	
2012	Lost Super Rugby quarter-final 13–28 to Crusaders	21 July 2012
2019	Lost Super Rugby quarter-final 28–35 to Hurricanes	22 June 2019
2023	Lost United Rugby Championship quarter-final 33–21 to Stormers	6 May 2023
2024	Lost European Rugby Champions Cup quarter-final 59–22 to Northampton Saints	13 April 2024
2025	Lost EPCR Challenge Cup quarter-final 28–34 to Edinburgh	12 April 2025

== Trophies and honours ==
- Team of the Year for the 2010 season
- Team of the Year for the 2020 season

=== Major international and domestic honours ===
Major honours in international competitions
Competition	Span	Titles won	Runner-up	Semi-finalists	Quarter-finalists	Qualifying-finalists	Round of 16
Super 10	1993	(0)	(0)	'			
Super Rugby	1996–2020	(3) 2007, 2009, 2010	(0)	(4) 1996, 2005, 2006, 2013	(1) 2019	(1) 2012	
Super Rugby Conference trophy	2011–2019	(1) 2013	(4) 2012, 2014, 2016, 2019				
United Rugby Championship	2021–2025	(0)	(3) 2021–22, 2023–24, 2024–25	(0)	(1) 2022–23		
United Rugby Championship SA Shield	2021–2025	(1) 2023–24	(2) 2021–22, 2022–23				
Pro14 Rainbow Cup	2021	(0)	(1) 2021				
Super Rugby Unlocked	2020	(1) 2020	(0)				
European Rugby Champions Cup	2022–2025	(0)	(0)	(0)	(1) 2023–24		(2) 2022–23, 2025–26
EPCR Challenge Cup	2025	(0)	(0)	(0)	(1) 2024–25		(0)
Major honours in domestic competitions
Currie Cup	1939–2025	(25) 1946, 1956, 1968, 1969, 1973, 1974, 1975, 1977, 1978, 1980, 1981, 1987, 1988, 1991, 1998, 2002, 2003, 2004, 2009, 2020–21, 2021 (Title shared in 1971, 1979, 1989, 2006)	(9)	(10)	(1)		
Currie Cup First Division	2000	(1) 2000	(0)	(0)			
Lion Cup	1983–1994	(3) 1985, 1990, 1991	(3) 1987, 1988, 1989	(4) 1983, 1984, 1986, 1993	(1) 1994		
Vodacom Cup	1998–2015	(3) 2001, 2008, 2010	(6) 2002, 2003, 2004, 2007, 2009, 2011	(4) 2005, 2012, 2014, 2015	(2) 2000, 2013		
Rugby Challenge	2017–2019	(0)	(0)	(1) 2017	(1) 2018		
SA Rugby Under-23 Cup	2026	(1) 2026	(0)	(0)	(0)		
Toyota Challenge	2022	(0)	(1) 2022	(0)			
M-Net Nite Series	1992–1995	(3) 1992, 1993, 1995	(0)				
Percy Frames Trophy	1986–1994	(6) 1987, 1988, 1989, 1990, 1991, 1992	(1) 1994				
Teljoy Cup	1986–1992	(5) 1986, 1987, 1988, 1990, 1992	(1) 1991				
Ellis Park Challenge Series	1985	(1) 1985	(0)				

=== Currie Cup finals ===
Season	Winners	Score	Runner-up	Venue
1946	Northern Transvaal	11 - 9	Western Province	Loftus Versfeld, Pretoria
1954	Western Province	11 - 8	Northern Transvaal	Newlands, Cape Town
1956	Northern Transvaal	9 - 8	Sharks	Kings Park, Durban
1968	Northern Transvaal	16 - 3	Transvaal	Loftus Versfeld, Pretoria
1969	Northern Transvaal	28 - 13	Western Province	Loftus Versfeld, Pretoria
1970	Griqualand West	11 - 9	Northern Transvaal	De Beers, Kimberley
1971	Northern Transvaal, Transvaal (shared)	14 - 14	—N/a	Ellis Park, Johannesburg
1973	Northern Transvaal	30 - 22	Orange Free State	Loftus Versfeld, Pretoria
1974	Northern Transvaal	17 - 15	Transvaal	Loftus Versfeld, Pretoria
1975	Northern Transvaal	12 - 6	Orange Free State	Free State Stadium, Bloemfontein
1977	Northern Transvaal	27 - 12	Orange Free State	Loftus Versfeld, Pretoria
1978	Northern Transvaal	13 - 9	Orange Free State	Free State Stadium, Bloemfontein
1979	Northern Transvaal, Western Province (shared)	15 - 15	—N/a	Newlands, Cape Town
1980	Northern Transvaal	39 - 9	Western Province	Loftus Versfeld, Pretoria
1981	Northern Transvaal	23 - 6	Orange Free State	Loftus Versfeld, Pretoria
1982	Western Province	24 - 7	Northern Transvaal	Newlands, Cape Town
1983	Western Province	9 - 3	Northern Transvaal	Newlands, Cape Town
1985	Western Province	22 - 15	Northern Transvaal	Newlands, Cape Town
1987	Northern Transvaal	24 - 18	Transvaal	Ellis Park, Johannesburg
1988	Northern Transvaal	19 - 18	Western Province	Loftus Versfeld, Pretoria
1989	Northern Transvaal, Western Province (shared)	16 - 16	—N/a	Newlands, Cape Town
1990	Sharks	18 - 12	Northern Transvaal	Loftus Versfeld, Pretoria
1991	Northern Transvaal	27 - 15	Transvaal	Loftus Versfeld, Pretoria
1998	Blue Bulls^{1}	24 - 20	Western Province	Loftus Versfeld, Pretoria
2002	Blue Bulls	31 - 7	Golden Lions²	Ellis Park, Johannesburg
2003	Blue Bulls	40 - 19	Sharks	Loftus Versfeld, Pretoria
2004	Blue Bulls	42 - 33	Free State Cheetahs³	Loftus Versfeld, Pretoria
2005	Free State Cheetahs	29 - 25	Blue Bulls	Loftus Versfeld, Pretoria
2006	Blue Bulls, Free State Cheetahs (shared)	28 - 28	—N/a	Vodacom Park, Bloemfontein
2008	Sharks	14 - 9	Blue Bulls	Kings Park Stadium, Durban
2009	Blue Bulls	36 - 24	Free State Cheetahs	Loftus Versfeld, Pretoria
2016	Free State Cheetahs	36 - 16	Blue Bulls	Free State Stadium, Bloemfontein
2020–21	Blue Bulls	26 - 19	Sharks	Loftus Versfeld, Pretoria
2021	Blue Bulls	44 - 10	Sharks	Loftus Versfeld, Pretoria

^{1} Northern Transvaal was renamed to the Blue Bulls.
^{2} Transvaal was renamed to the Golden Lions.
^{3} The Orange Free State have since been renamed to the Free State Cheetahs.

=== Minor honours ===
Minor honours
Competition	Number of titles	Runner-up
Gauteng Rugby Cup	(1) 2013	(0)
Sanlam Challenge Shield	(1) 2015	(0)
Lafarge Zimbabwe Champions Cup	(0)	(1) 2016
World Club 10s	(2) 2017, 2018	(0)
Officeconomix Goodwill Challenge	(1) 2022	(0)
IBG Challenge Cup	(1) 2024	(0)
Mapungubwe Rugby Cup	(1) 2024	(0)

== Season-by-season record ==
Bulls season standings and results
Competition	Season	Pos	P	W	D	L	PF	PA	PD	BP	Pts	Playoffs	Season result	Conference/shield	Top points scorer	Points	Top try scorer	Tries
EPCR Challenge Cup	↓ 2024–25	N/A	N/A	N/A	N/A	N/A	N/A	N/A	N/A	N/A	N/A	Lost quarter-final 28-34 vs Edinburgh	Quarter-finalists	N/A	David Kriel	15	David Kriel	3
European Rugby Champions Cup
European Rugby Champions Cup	2025–26	4th Pool 4	4	1	0	3	113	181	-68	3	7	Lost Round of 16 21-25 vs Glasgow Warriors	Round of 16	N/A	Handre Pollard	35	Stravino Jacobs	3
European Rugby Champions Cup	2024–25	5th Pool 3	4	1	0	3	84	113	-29	1	5		Qualified to Challenge Cup	N/A	Cameron Hanekom	15	Cameron Hanekom	3
European Rugby Champions Cup	2023–24	2nd Pool A	4	3	0	1	132	102	+30	3	15	Lost quarter-final 22-59 vs Northampton Saints	Quarter-finalists	N/A	Johan Goosen	41	David Kriel, Marcell Coetzee, Embrose Papier, Sebastian de Klerk	3
European Rugby Champions Cup	2022–23	7th Pool A	4	2	0	2	102	139	-37	2	10	Lost Round of 16 9-33 vs Toulouse	Round of 16	N/A	Chris Smith, Morné Steyn	16	Chris Smit, Wandisile Simelane, Bernard van der Linde, Stravino Jacobs	2
United Rugby Championship	2026–27																	
United Rugby Championship	2025–26	4th	18	12	0	6	576	406	+170	11	59	Lost final 7–36 to Leinster.	Runners up🥈 (4)	4th	Handré Pollard	127	Embrose Papier	12
United Rugby Championship	2024–25	2nd	18	14	0	4	542	361	+181	12	68	Lost final 7–32 to Leinster.	Runners up🥈 (3)	3rd	David Kriel	71	David Kriel	8
United Rugby Championship	2023–24	2nd	18	13	0	5	639	433	+206	14	66	Lost final 16–21 to Glasgow.	Runners up🥈 (2)	Champions 🏆 1st	Johan Goosen	167	Akker van der Merwe	12
United Rugby Championship	2022–23	6th	18	10	0	8	613	448	+165	13	53	Lost quarter-final 21–33 to Stormers	Quarter-finalists	Runners up (2)	Chris Smith	129	Canan Moodie	8
United Rugby Championship	2021–22	4th	18	11	0	7	518	388	+130	14	58	Lost final 13–18 to Stormers.	Runners up🥈 (1)	Runners up (1)	Chris Smith	153	Marcell Coetzee	11
Pro14 Rainbow Cup	2021	1st	6	5	0	1	183	117	+66	5	25	Lost final 35–8 to Benetton.	Runners up🥈	N/A	Morné Steyn	53	Madosh Tambwe	4
Preparation Series	2021	1st	4	3	0	1	181	115	+66	3	15	No trophy or playoffs	Top of pool A	N/A	Chris Smith	38	Joe van Zyl	4
Super Rugby Unlocked	2020	1st	6	5	0	1	178	92	+86	3	23	No playoffs	Champions🏆	N/A	Morné Steyn	62	Stedman Gans	5
Super Rugby
Super Rugby	2020	12th	6	1	0	5	115	152	-37	1	6	Season cancelled due to COVID-19		4th	Morné Steyn	40	Rosko Specman	4
Super Rugby	2019	5th	16	8	2	6	410	369	+41	3	41	Lost quarterfinals 35–28 to the Hurricanes.	Quarter-finalists	Runners up (4)	Handré Pollard	194	Cornal Hendricks, Rosko Specman, Hanro Liebenberg	5
Super Rugby	2018	12th	16	6	0	10	441	502	-61	2	29			5th	Handré Pollard	144	Jesse Kriel	8
Super Rugby	2017	15th	15	4	0	11	339	459	-120	4	20			3rd	Tian Schoeman	80	Jesse Kriel	5
Super Rugby	2016	9th	15	9	1	5	399	339	+60	4	42			Runners up (3)	Francois Brummer	109	Adriaan Strauss, Travis Ismaiel	6
Super Rugby	2015	9th	16	7	0	9	397	388	+9	10	38			3rd	Handré Pollard	167	Francois Hougaard	7
Super Rugby	2014	9th	16	7	1	8	365	335	+30	8	38			Runners up (2)	Jacques-Louis Potgieter	144	Jono Ross	4
Super Rugby	2013	2nd	16	12	0	4	448	330	+118	7	63	Lost semi-final 23–26 to the Brumbies.	Semi-finalists	Champions 🏆 1st	Morné Steyn	248	Jano Vermaak	5
Super Rugby	2012	5th	16	10	0	6	472	369	+103	11	59	Lost qualifiers 28–13 to the Crusaders.	Qualifying-finalists	Runners up (1)	Morné Steyn	228	Bjorn Basson	10
Super Rugby	2011	7th	16	10	0	6	416	370	+46	6	54			3rd	Morné Steyn	216	Bjorn Basson	9
Super 14	2010	1st	13	10	0	3	436	345	+91	7	47	Defeated the Stormers 25–17	Champions 🏆 3rd	N/A	Morné Steyn	263	Gerhard van den Heever	8
Super 14	2009	1st	13	10	0	3	338	271	+67	6	46	Defeated the Chiefs 61–17	Champions 🏆 2nd	N/A	Morné Steyn	191	Bryan Habana	8
Super 14	2008	10th	13	6	0	7	324	347	−23	4	28			N/A	Morné Steyn	82	Akona Ndungane	7
Super 14	2007	1st	13	9	0	4	388	223	+165	6	42	Defeated the Sharks 19–20	Champions🏆 1st	N/A	Derick Hougaard	161	Bryan Habana	8
Super 14	2006	4th	13	7	1	5	355	290	+65	8	38	Lost semi-final 35–15 to Crusaders.	Semi-finalists	N/A	Derick Hougaard	93	Bryan Habana	7
Super 12
Super 12	2005	3rd	11	7	0	4	301	229	+72	6	34	Lost semi-final 23–13 to Waratahs.	Semi-finalists	N/A	Morne Steyn	110	Bryan Habana	9
Super 12	2004	6th	11	5	1	5	302	320	−18	6	28			N/A	Derick Hougaard	101	Fourie du Preez	5
Super 12	2003	6th	11	6	0	5	320	354	−34	5	30			N/A	Louis Koen	139	Frikkie Welsh	5
Super 12	2002	12th	11	0	0	11	232	500	−268	1	1			N/A	Boeta Wessels	29	Adrian Jacobs, Wylie Human	5
Super 12	2001	12th	11	2	0	9	241	378	−137	3	11			N/A	Casper Steyn	97	Frikkie Welsh, Friedrich Lombard, Adrian Jacobs	4
Super 12	2000	11th	11	1	2	8	231	395	−164	3	11			N/A	Jannie de Beer	123	Deon de Kock	3
Super 12	1999	12th	11	1	0	10	203	447	−244	3	7			N/A	Franco Smith	59	Jan-Harm van Wyk, Schutte Bekker, Pierre Ribbens	2
Super 12	1998	11th	11	3	0	8	249	306	−57	4	16			N/A	Franco Smith	65	Casper Steyn	5
Super 12	1997	8th	11	3	3	5	264	342	−78	4	22			N/A	Casper Steyn	50	Jacques Olivier	4
Super 12	1996	4th	11	8	0	3	329	208	+121	6	38	Lost semi-final 48–11 to Auckland Blues.	Semi-finalists	N/A	Jannie Kruger	139	Adriaan Richter	4
Super 10 (amateur era)	1995											Did not qualify		N/A				
Super 10 (amateur era)	1994											Did not qualify		N/A				
Super 10 (amateur era)	1993	3rd	4	2	0	2	109	109	0	0	8			N/A				

Gold background denotes champions
Silver background denotes runner-up
Bronze background denotes semi-finalists
Cyan background denotes quarter-finalists
Purple background denotes Round of 16

↑ After entering the Champions Cup competition from the EPCR Challenge Cup

↓ After dropping into the EPCR Challenge Cup competition from the Champions Cup

Key:	Super 10	Super 12	Super 14	Super Rugby	Super Rugby Unlocked	Preparation Series	Pro 14 Rainbow Cup	United Rugby Championship	European Rugby Champions Cup	EPCR Challenge Cup

=== Currie Cup season-by-season standings ===
Blue Bulls season by season standings in the Currie Cup Premier Division 1996–2025 (professional era)
Season	Log	Pos	P	W	D	L	PF	PA	PD	TF	TA	TB	LB	Pts	Notes		Top points scorer	Pts	Top try scorer	Tries
2026		8th	7	0	0	7	186	320	-134	29	47			6	Did not qualify for play-offs.		Keagan Johannes	35	Kebotile Maake	4
2025		6th	7	3	0	4	200	209	−9	29	29	3	0	15	Did not qualify for play-offs.		Boeta Chamberlain	45	Jeandre Rudolph	4
2024		2nd	10	7	1	2	384	266	+118	54	37	7	1	38	Semi-final was drawn 40 all after extra time. The Sharks advanced due to scoring more tries in the match 6–4.	Semi-finalists	Jaco van der Walt	81	Mpilo Gumede	7
2023		4th	14	7	0	7	399	415	-16	57	53	8	2	38	Lost semi-final 10–39 to Cheetahs	Semi-finalists	Johan Goosen	49	David Kriel	7
2022		2nd	12	9	1	2	398	306	+92	56	42	9	0	47	Lost semi-final 19–30 to Griquas	Semi-finalists	Chris Smith	54	David Kriel	5
2021		1st	12	7	3	2	334	260	+74	46	30	8	1	49	Beat the Sharks 44–10 in the final	Champions 🏆 25th	Johan Goosen	99	Zak Burger, Cornal Hendricks	5
2020–21		1st	12	8	1	3	305	216	+89	32	22	3	2	39	Beat the Sharks 26–19 in the final. Each team started with the log points from the Super Rugby Unlocked competition.	Champions 🏆 24th	Morné Steyn	62	Marco van Staden	3
2019		6th	6	2	0	4	143	191	−48	20	25	2	0	10	Did not qualify for play-offs.		Manie Libbok	46	Rosko Specman	5
2018		4th	6	3	0	3	170	179	−9	24	25	4	1	17	Lost semi-final 32–35 to Western Province	Semi-finalists	Manie Libbok	68	Ruan Steenkamp	5
2017		4th	12	5	0	7	457	442	+15	63	62	9	3	32	Lost semi-final 27–37 to Sharks	Semi-finalists	Tony Jantjies	70	Warrick Gelant	10
2016		7th	14	7	0	7	459	376	+83	65	45	8	2	38	2016 Currie Cup qualification round		Joshua Stander	77	Marquit September	8
2016		2nd	8	6	0	2	310	207	+103	40	26	5	1	30	Lost final 16–36 to Free State Cheetahs	Runner-up	Tian Schoeman	146	Jamba Ulengo	7
2015		2nd	10	8	0	2	342	238	+104	41	26	7	0	39	Lost semi-final 18–23 to Western Province	Semi-finalists	Tian Schoeman	135	Jamba Ulengo	11
2014		4th	10	6	0	4	271	235	+36	27	23	3	1	28	Lost semi-final 23–31 to Western Province	Semi-finalists	Jacques-Louis Potgieter	125	Bjorn Basson, Sampie Mastriet, Deon Stegmann	4
2013		5th	10	3	1	6	225	253	–28	24	28	2	1	17	Did not qualify for play-offs.		Handré Pollard	62	Francois Venter	4
2012		4th	10	5	0	5	280	291	−11	19	29	1	1	23	Lost semi-final 3–20 to Sharks	Semi-finalists	Louis Fouché	137	CJ Stander	5
2011		5th	14	8	1	5	452	368	+84	54	40	5	1	40	Did not qualify for play-offs.		Louis Fouché	126	Bjorn Basson	10
2010		4th	14	9	0	5	437	374	+63	47	39	6	5	47	Lost semi-final 12–16 to Sharks	Semi-finalists	Jacques-Louis Potgieter	171	Stefan Watermeyer	6
2009		3rd	14	9	0	5	475	299	+176	56	28	6	4	46	Beat Cheetahs 36–24 in the final	Champions 🏆 23rd	Morné Steyn	105	Gerhard van den Heever	11
2008		2nd	14	11	0	3	482	235	+247	61	27	8	1	53	Lost final 9–14 to Sharks	Runner-up	Morné Steyn	192	John Mametsa	7
2007		4th	14	8	0	6	424	282	+142	54	33	6	1	39	Lost semi-final 6–11 to Free State Cheetahs	Semi-finalists	Derick Hougaard	114	John Mametsa	14
2006		2nd	14	10	0	4	479	284	+195	63	32	8	2	50	Drew 28–28 with Free State Cheetahs	Champions 🏆 22nd	Morné Steyn	138	Derick Kuun, Marius Delport, Dries Scholtz	7
2005	Sect X	3rd	6	4	0	2	261	141	+120	38	18	4	1	21	2005 Currie Cup qualifying round		Kennedy Tsimba	43	John Mametsa	6
2005	Sect X	1st	8	8	0	0	347	115	+232	46	12	5	0	37	Lost final 25–29 to Free State Cheetahs	Runner-up	Morné Steyn	118	Akona Ndungane, Pedrie Wannenburg	6
2004		1st	14	11	2	1	545	315	+230	69	38	7	1	56	Beat Free State Cheetahs 42–33 in the final	Champions 🏆 21st	Derick Hougaard	188	Ettienne Botha	18
2003		1st	14	11	0	3	538	372	+166	73	44	9	2	55	Beat the Sharks 40–19 in the final	Champions 🏆 20th	Louis Strydom	133	Johan Roets	9
2002	Sect Y	2nd	6	4	1	1	185	125	+60	21	14	3	1	22	2002 Currie Cup qualifying round (Points of 3 matches vs the Currie Cup teams retained for Premier Div log)					
2002	Premier Div	4th	7	5	1	1	225	136	+89	21	13	2	1	25	Beat the Lions 31–7 in the final	Champions 🏆 19th	Derick Hougaard	151	Jaco van der Westhuyzen	5
2001	Sect Y	3rd	6	4	0	2	231	148	+83	30	13	3	1	20	2001 Currie Cup qualification					
2001	Top 8	7th	7	2	0	5	191	187	+4	11	14	2	2	12	Did not qualify for play-offs.		Jaco van der Westhuyzen	81	Jaco van der Westhuyzen	5
2000	Sect Y	6th	6	3	0	3	232	228	+4	22	25	3	1	16	2000 Currie Cup qualification Did not qualify for Currie Cup Premier Div. (6 points carried forward to the Bankfin Cup.)		Casper Steyn	149	Casper Steyn	6
2000	Bankfin Cup	2nd	5	3	0	2	205	178	+27	25	20	4	2	18	Beat the Mighty Elephants 41–20 in the Bankfin Cup Final	Champions 🏆 1st	Franco Smith	77	McNeil Hendricks	7
1999		5th	13	8	1	4	483	346	+137	-	-	5	2	41	Did not qualify for play-offs.		Casper Steyn	252	Casper Steyn	12
1998		2nd	13	10	0	3	461	231	+230	65	28	7	2	49	Beat Western Province 24–20 in the final	Champions 🏆 18th	Franco Smith	112	Grant Esterhuizen	8
1997		5th	13	8	0	5	382	341	+41	39	33	6	2	40	Did not qualify for play-offs.		Casper Steyn	106	Archer Dames	5
1996	Sect B	1st	12	11	0	1	707	207	+500	93	23	-	-	22	Lost semi-final 21–31 to Transvaal	Semi-finalists	Theo van Rensburg	111	Hannes Venter	13

=== Bulls XV ===
Blue Bulls XV results for each season were as follows:

Seasons
Competition	Season	Section	Pos	Pl	W	D	L	PF	PA	PD	Pts	Play-offs	Top points scorer	Points	Top try scorer	Tries
SA Rugby Under-23 Cup
SA Rugby Under-23 Cup	2026		2nd	6	3	0	3	230	152	+78	18	Champions 1st 🏆	Keagan Johannes	22	JJ Theron, Henry Immelman	4
SuperSport Rugby Challenge
SuperSport Rugby Challenge	2019	Northern Section	3rd	7	5	0	2	332	190	+142	25	Did not qualify for play-offs.	JT Jackson	52	Duncan Matthews	6
SuperSport Rugby Challenge	2018	Northern Section	3rd	8	5	0	3	317	255	+62	27	Quarter-finalists	Earll Douwrie	79	Xolisa Guma	6
SuperSport Rugby Challenge	2017	Northern Section	2nd	8	5	0	3	376	240	+136	29	Semi-finalists	Tinus de Beer	44	Boom Prinsloo, Franco Naudé	6
	2016^{1}											No competition				
Vodacom Cup
Vodacom Cup	2015	Northern Section	2nd	7	6	0	1	282	114	+168	29	Semi-finalists	Kobus Marais	85	Kefentse Mahlo	6
Vodacom Cup	2014	Northern Section	3rd	7	5	0	2	315	111	+204	26	Semi-finalists	Tian Schoeman	60	Sampie Mastriet	7
Vodacom Cup	2013	Northern Section	2nd	7	5	0	2	435	159	+276	28	Quarter-finalists	Tony Jantjies	79	Sampie Mastriet	9
Vodacom Cup	2012	Northern Section	3rd	6	4	1	1	212	116	+96	21	Semi-finalists	Wesley Dunlop	44	Sampie Mastriet	5
Vodacom Cup	2011	Northern Section	4th	8	3	0	5	197	175	+22	17	Runners-up 🥈	Marnitz Boshoff	87	Sampie Mastriet	5
Vodacom Cup	2010	Northern Section	1st	7	7	0	0	251	136	+63	32	Champions 3rd 🏆	Francois Brummer	90	Stefan Watermeyer, Gerrit-Jan van Velze	5
Vodacom Cup	2009	Northern Section	1st	6	5	1	0	180	117	+63	24	Runners-up 🥈	Francois Brummer	158	Rocco Jansen	5
Vodacom Cup	2008	Northern Section	1st	7	5	0	2	279	161	+118	28	Champions 2nd 🏆	Burton Francis	115	Rocco Jansen	14
Vodacom Cup	2007	Northern Section	2nd	6	5	0	1	184	104	+80	23	Runners-up 🥈	Jacques-Louis Potgieter	112	Dries Scholtz, Lukhanyo Nontshinga	4
Vodacom Cup	2006	Vodacom Cup	3rd	13	9	0	4	383	278	+105	45	Did not qualify for play-offs.	Jacques-Louis Potgieter	87	Marius Delport	8
Vodacom Cup	2005	Section X	1st	7	5	0	2	255	184	+71	28	Semi-finalists	Jacques-Louis Potgieter	69	Derick Kuun	4
Vodacom Cup	2004	Vodacom Cup	3rd	6	4	0	2	231	186	+45	22	Runners-up 🥈	Gideon Gerhardus Roux	44	Carel Hoffman	5
Vodacom Cup	2003	Section Y	1st	6	5	0	1	236	133	+103	26	Runners-up 🥈	Gideon Gerhardus Roux	107	JP Nel	6
Vodacom Cup	2002	Section Y	1st	6	5	0	1	260	157	+103	26	Runners-up 🥈				
Vodacom Cup	2002	Top Eight	3rd	7	4	0	3	242	240	+2	21	Runners-up 🥈				
Vodacom Cup	2001	Section Y	1st	6	5	0	1	242	140	+102	27	Champions 1st 🏆				
Vodacom Cup	2001	Top Eight	1st	4	4	0	0	150	117	+33	34	Champions 1st 🏆				
Vodacom Cup	2000	Northern Section	3rd	7	5	0	2	265	187	+78	23	Quarter-finalists	Tiaan Snyman	102	Johan Roets	5
Vodacom Cup	1999	Northern Section	5th	14	7	0	7	416	468	–52	36	Did not qualify for play-offs.	Casper Steyn	99	Johan Roets, Petrus Arnold	7
Vodacom Cup	1998	Sect B	5th	12	4	0	8	303	389	–86	18	Did not qualify for play-offs.	Roland de Marigny	122	Torros Pretorius	6
Bankfin Nite Series	1997											Did not participate				
Bankfin Nite Series	1996											Did not participate				

Bankfin Nite Series seasons 1996 - 1997

Vodacom Cup seasons 1998 - 2015

SuperSport Rugby Challenge 2017 - 2019
