= 2004 Currie Cup First Division =

Domestic rugby union competition

- Countries: South Africa
- Date: 10 July – 22 October 2004
- Champions: Boland Cavaliers (3rd title)
- Runners-up: Border Bulldogs
- Matches played: 33
- Tries scored: 246 (average 7.5 per match)
- Top point scorer: Solly Goosen (164); Boland Cavaliers
- Top try scorer: Ossie Damons (11); Griffons

The 2004 Absa Currie Cup First Division season was the second tier competition in the 66th Currie Cup season since it started in 1889. It was won by the Boland Cavaliers, who defeated the Border Bulldogs 23–22 in the final at the Boland Stadium, Wellington on 22 October 2004.

== Competition ==
There were six participating teams in the 2004 Currie Cup First Division. These teams played each other twice over the course of the season, once at home and once away.

Teams received four points for a win and two points for a draw. Bonus points were awarded to teams that scored 4 or more tries in a game, as well as to teams that lost a match by seven points or less. Teams were ranked by log points.

The top four teams qualified for the title play-offs. In the semi-finals, the team that finished first had home advantage against the team that finished fourth, while the team that finished second had home advantage against the team that finished third. The winners of these semi-finals played each other in the final, at the home venue of the higher-placed team.

== Teams ==
Location of teams in 2004 Currie Cup First Division

2004 Currie Cup First Division teams
Team	Sponsored Name	Stadium/s	Sponsored Name
Boland Cavaliers	Boland Cavaliers	Boland Stadium, Wellington	Boland Stadium
Border Bulldogs	Border Bulldogs	Buffalo City Stadium, East London	ABSA Stadium
Falcons	Falcons	Pam Brink Stadium, Springs	Pam Brink Stadium
Griffons	Griffons	North West Stadium, Welkom	North West Stadium
Leopards	Leopards	Olën Park, Potchefstroom	Olën Park
Mighty Elephants	Mighty Elephants	EPRU Stadium, Port Elizabeth	EPRU Stadium

== Log ==
2004 Currie Cup First Division log
Pos	Team	Pld	W	D	L	PF	PA	PD	TF	TA	TB	LB	Pts	Qualification
1	Boland Cavaliers	10	7	0	3	337	217	+120	41	25	5	3	36	Semi-final
2	Border Bulldogs	10	8	0	2	291	294	−3	35	38	4	0	36	Semi-final
3	Leopards	10	7	0	3	319	251	+68	42	29	6	1	35	Semi-final
4	Falcons	10	3	0	7	287	398	−111	35	49	5	4	21	Semi-final
5	Mighty Elephants	10	3	0	7	278	278	0	32	36	3	5	20	
6	Griffons	10	2	0	8	317	391	−74	43	51	6	2	16	

Rules for classification: 4 points for a win; 2 points for a draw; 1 bonus point for a loss by seven points or less; 1 bonus point for scoring four or more tries in a match

== Fixtures and results ==
=== Regular season ===
==== Round one ====
10 July 2004	Boland Cavaliers	31–22	Griffons	Boland Stadium, Wellington
16:00	Try: Piet van Zyl 47'; Solly Goosen 76'; Bronwin Julies 81'; Con: Solly Goosen 77', 82' (2/2); Pen: Patrick Petersen 4', 10', 39' (3/3); Solly Goosen 68' (1/1)	Scoreboard	Try: Ockie van Zyl 20'; Jacques Maritz 44'; Ossie Damons 69'; Con: Slang Roux 21', 70' (2/2); Pen: Slang Roux 28' (1/1); Cards: Tienie Goosen (yellow card) 17'; JP Joubert (yellow card) 75'	Attendance: 750; Referee: Michael Katzenellenbogen

10 July 2004	Mighty Elephants	25–27	Border Bulldogs	EPRU Stadium, Port Elizabeth
16:00	Try: Wayne Bennett 3'; Sam Willard 16'; Clayton Gawie 81'; Con: Justin Peach 4', 17' (2/2); Pen: Justin Peach 60', 68' (2/2)	Scoreboard	Try: Akona Ndungane 34'; Tiger Mangweni 38', 52'; Con: Reinhardt Gerber 35', 39', 53' (3/3); Pen: Reinhardt Gerber 18', 69' (2/2)	Attendance: 530; Referee: Craig Joubert

Bye/s: Falcons, Leopards

==== Round two ====
16 July 2004	Border Bulldogs	14–13	Falcons	Absa Stadium, East London
19:10	Try: Pietie Loots 80'; Con: Reinhardt Gerber (0/1); Pen: Reinhardt Gerber 6', 16', 53' (3/3)	Scoreboard	Try: Leon Lubbe 76'; Con: Ruan Coetzee 77' (1/1); Pen: Ruan Coetzee 3', 12' (2/2); Cards: Deon de Kock (yellow card) 52'	Attendance: 1,500; Referee: Jerome Fortuin

17 July 2004	Griffons	34–31	Mighty Elephants	North West Stadium, Welkom
16:00	Try: Ossie Damons 5'; JP Joubert 24'; Raydall Walters 31'; Velile Phiri 49'; Collen Radebe 68'; Con: Slang Roux 6', 25', 50' (3/3); Pen: Slang Roux 2' (1/1)	Scoreboard	Try: Elroy Ligman 37'; Michael Killian 57'; Sam Willard 79'; Con: Justin Peach 38', 58' (2/2); Pen: Justin Peach 46', 59', 62', 65' (4/4); Cards: JJ Pienaar (yellow card) 43'

17 July 2004	Leopards	31–28	Boland Cavaliers	Olën Park, Potchefstroom
16:00	Try: Jaco Engels 18'; Colin Lloyd 42'; Frans Viljoen 52'; MJ Mentz 60'; Con: Corrie Avenant 19', 43', 53' (3/3); Colin Lloyd 61' (1/1); Pen: Colin Lloyd 68' (1/1); Cards: MJ Mentz (yellow card) 36'	Scoreboard	Try: Conrad Burke 22'; Rayno Benjamin 37'; Antonius Verhoeven 76'; Con: Solly Goosen 23', 77' (2/2); Pen: Solly Goosen 16', 27', 57' (3/3); Cards: Henley du Plessis (yellow card) 33'; Kobus le Roux (yellow card) 36'	Attendance: 1,500; Referee: Marius Jonker

==== Round three ====
24 July 2004	Falcons	42–36	Griffons	Pam Brink Stadium, Springs
16:00	Try: Godfrey Mbangeni 10'; David de la Port 13', 62'; Jan Cloete 20'; Skollie de Jager 53'; Con: Hennie Stapelberg 11', 14', 54', 63' (4/4); Pen: Hennie Stapelberg 35', 75', 78' (3/3); Cards: Nico Luus (yellow card) 42'	Scoreboard	Try: Jaco Binneman 33'; Ockie van Zyl 44'; Innes van Rooyen 50'; Tienie Goosen 58', 80'; Con: Slang Roux 45', 51', 59', 81' (4/4); Pen: Jaco Steenberg 9' (1/1)

24 July 2004	Mighty Elephants	19–10	Leopards	EPRU Stadium, Port Elizabeth
16:00	Try: Sebastian Hilpert 58'; Con: Justin Peach 59' (1/1); Pen: Justin Peach 13', 21', 28', 49' (4/4)	Scoreboard	Try: Colin Lloyd 62'; Con: Corrie Avenant 63' (1/1); Pen: Corrie Avenant 37' (1/1)	Attendance: 460; Referee: Nolan Arends

Bye/s: Boland Cavaliers, Border Bulldogs

==== Round four ====
31 July 2004	Boland Cavaliers	32–15	Mighty Elephants	Boland Stadium, Wellington
16:00	Try: Rayno Benjamin 11', 32', 77'; Chris Potgieter 24'; Con: Solly Goosen 12', 25', 78' (3/3); Pen: Solly Goosen 18', 36' (2/2)	Scoreboard	Try: Fabian Juries 45'; Vuyani Dlomo 71'; Con: Chris Jonck 46' (1/1); Pen: Justin Peach 6' (1/1)	Attendance: 450

31 July 2004	Griffons	29–40	Border Bulldogs	North West Stadium, Welkom
16:00	Try: Collen Radebe 3'; Tienie Goosen 7'; Ockie van Zyl 13'; Christo van Niekerk 28'; Innes van Rooyen 75'; Con: Slang Roux 8', 29' (2/2); Cards: Jaco Binneman (yellow card) 53'	Scoreboard	Try: Dru Nass 16'; Ian Fihlani 35'; Thembani Mkokeli 38'; Michael Coetzee 54'; Derek Hendry 56'; Con: Reinhardt Gerber 36', 39', 57' (3/3); Pen: Reinhardt Gerber 25', 63', 73' (3/3)	Referee: Gareth Jones

31 July 2004	Leopards	26–23	Falcons	Olën Park, Potchefstroom
16:00	Try: Corrie Avenant 61'; Barry Geel 78'; Con: Corrie Avenant 62', 79' (2/2); Pen: Corrie Avenant 6', 15', 65', 69' (4/4)	Scoreboard	Try: Ruan Coetzee 22'; Godfrey Mbangeni 44'; Con: Hennie Stapelberg 23', 45' (2/2); Pen: Hennie Stapelberg 3', 70' (2/2); Drop: Hennie Stapelberg 63' (1/1)	Attendance: 200; Referee: James Sherriff

==== Round Five ====
6 August 2004	Falcons	31–26	Boland Cavaliers	Pam Brink Stadium, Springs
19:00	Try: Jaco Venter 9', 46'; Ruan Coetzee 73'; Con: Hennie Stapelberg 10', 47' (2/2); Pen: Hennie Stapelberg 14', 57', 68' (3/3); Drop: Hennie Stapelberg 24' (1/1)	Scoreboard	Try: Pieter Terblanché 3'; Chris Potgieter 11'; Con: Solly Goosen 4', 12' (2/2); Pen: Solly Goosen 33', 38', 42', 49' (4/4)	Attendance: 100; Referee: Marius Jonker

6 August 2004	Border Bulldogs	26–21	Leopards	Absa Stadium, East London
19:10	Try: Zolani Mofu 11'; Marcel van der Walt 30'; Con: Reinhardt Gerber 12', 31' (2/2); Pen: Reinhardt Gerber 8', 14', 26', 37' (4/4)	Scoreboard	Try: Wonga Joka 1' penalty try 33'; Con: Corrie Avenant 34' (1/1); Pen: Corrie Avenant 23', 58', 74' (3/3)	Attendance: 2,000; Referee: Willie Roos

Bye/s: Griffons, Mighty Elephants

==== Round Six ====
20 August 2004	Leopards	32–26	Griffons	Olën Park, Potchefstroom
19:00	Try: MJ Mentz 24'; Werner Lessing 34'; Barry Geel 53'; Charlie King 55'; Con: Colin Lloyd 25' (1/1); Corrie Avenant 35', 54' (2/2); Pen: Corrie Avenant 1' (1/1); Colin Lloyd 70' (1/1); Cards: Ryno Germishuys (yellow card) 68'	Scoreboard	Try: Ossie Damons 51'; Andries van der Linden 71'; Collen Radebe 76'; Con: Willem Slabbert 52' (1/1); Pen: Willem Slabbert 30', 39', 47' (3/3)	Attendance: 300

28 August 2004	Boland Cavaliers	48–16	Border Bulldogs	Boland Stadium, Wellington
16:00	Try: Charl Blom 4'; Jongi Nokwe 19'; David de Villiers 26'; Conrad Burke 52'; Henk Eksteen 55'; Piet van Zyl 77'; Rayno Benjamin 85'; Con: Solly Goosen 5', 27', 56' (3/3); Patrick Petersen 78', 86' (2/2); Pen: Solly Goosen 45' (1/1); Drop: Conrad Burke (0/1)	Scoreboard	Try: Marcel van der Walt 24'; Akona Ndungane 72'; Pen: Reinhardt Gerber 30', 35' (2/2); Cards: Vusumzi Mbulali (yellow card) 44'; Alastair Lyon (yellow card) 50'	Attendance: 900; Referee: Eugene Daniels

28 August 2004	Mighty Elephants	27–25	Falcons	EPRU Stadium, Port Elizabeth
16:00	Try: Francois Prinsloo 40'; Regardt van Eyck 57'; Michael Killian 78'; Michael Gallinetti 83'; Con: Justin Peach 41', 58' (2/2); Pen: Justin Peach 22' (1/1)	Scoreboard	Try: Skollie de Jager 35'; Jan Cloete 38'; Gustav Japhta 51'; Con: Hennie Stapelberg 36' (1/1); Deon de Kock 39' (1/1); Pen: Hennie Stapelberg 11' (1/1); Deon de Kock 18' (1/1); Cards: André Kies (yellow card) 4'	Attendance: 2,500; Referee: Craig Strachan

==== Round Seven ====
3 September 2004	Border Bulldogs	33–26	Mighty Elephants	Absa Stadium, East London
19:10	Try: Ian Fihlani 10', 51'; Dru Nass 34'; Marcel van der Walt 47'; Fergus Kennedy 55'; Con: Reinhardt Gerber 11', 35', 48', 52' (4/4)	Scoreboard	Try: Vuyani Dlomo 7', 15'; JJ Pienaar 27'; Con: Michael Gallinetti 28' (1/1); Pen: Michael Gallinetti 31', 67', 72' (3/3)	Attendance: 2,000

4 September 2004	Griffons	27–40	Boland Cavaliers	North West Stadium, Welkom
16:00	Try: Schalk de Klerk 55'; Ossie Damons 70', 72'; Con: Willem Slabbert 56', 71', 73' (3/3); Pen: Willem Slabbert 14', 34' (2/2)	Scoreboard	Try: Charl Blom 3'; Solly Goosen 23', 39', 48'; Henley du Plessis 46'; Jongi Nokwe 62'; Con: Solly Goosen 4', 24' (2/2); Pen: Solly Goosen 11', 59' (2/2)	Referee: James Sherriff

Bye/s: Falcons, Leopards

==== Round Eight ====
11 September 2004	Boland Cavaliers	25–13	Leopards	Boland Stadium, Wellington
16:00	Try: Charl Blom 10'; Rayno Benjamin 35'; Solly Goosen 42'; Jongi Nokwe 73'; Con: Solly Goosen 11' (1/1); Pen: Solly Goosen 51' (1/1); Cards: Henley du Plessis (yellow card) 23'; Angelo Brinkhuys (yellow card) 83'	Scoreboard	Try: MJ Mentz 48'; Con: Corrie Avenant 49' (1/1); Pen: Corrie Avenant 19', 54' (2/2)	Attendance: 500

11 September 2004	Falcons	39–43	Border Bulldogs	Pam Brink Stadium, Springs
16:00	Try: Jan Cloete 2'; Jacques Lombaard 20'; Godfrey Mbangeni 27'; Nico Luus 39'; Naas Rossouw 69'; Con: Hennie Stapelberg 3', 21', 28', 70' (4/4); Pen: Hennie Stapelberg 10', 36' (2/2)	Scoreboard	Try: Michael Coetzee 34'; Alastair Lyon 54'; Werner Coetzer 61'; Fergus Kennedy 64'; Akona Ndungane 73'; Con: Reinhardt Gerber 35' (1/1); Adam Robertson 62', 65' (2/2); Pen: Reinhardt Gerber 6', 15', 59' (3/3); Adam Robertson 79' (1/1)	Attendance: 400; Referee: Deon van Blommestein

11 September 2004	Mighty Elephants	54–20	Griffons	EPRU Stadium, Port Elizabeth
16:00	Try: Regardt van Eyck 3'; Vuyani Dlomo 9'; Sam Willard 43'; Fabian Juries 64'; Francois Prinsloo 74', 82'; Michael Gallinetti 78'; Con: Michael Gallinetti 4', 10', 44', 65', 83' (5/5); Pen: Michael Gallinetti 23', 37', 71' (3/3)	Scoreboard	Try: Ossie Damons 20', 53'; Innes van Rooyen 27'; Con: Willem Slabbert 28' (1/1); Pen: Willem Slabbert 33' (1/1)	Attendance: 500

==== Round Nine ====
18 September 2004	Griffons	66–24	Falcons	North West Stadium, Welkom
16:00	Try: Innes van Rooyen 10'; Ossie Damons 16', 75'; Tienie Goosen 28', 43'; Slang Roux 40', 53'; Raydall Walters 78'; Con: Morné van Zyl 10', 16', 28', 40', 53' (5/5); Slang Roux 75', 78' (2/2); Pen: Morné van Zyl 2', 9', 15', 70' (4/4); Cards: Bennie van Blerk (yellow card) 34'	Scoreboard	Try: Jacques Nieuwenhuis 20'; Naas Rossouw 39'; Sarel Lubbe 45'; Nico Luus 49'; Con: Hennie Stapelberg 39', 49' (2/2)

18 September 2004	Leopards	36–25	Mighty Elephants	Olën Park, Potchefstroom
16:00	Try: Riaan Harmse 2'; Theo van Wyk 22'; Willie Wepener 53'; Jaco Engels 66'; Cerneels Rautenbach 69'; MJ Mentz 77'; Con: Corrie Avenant 3' (1/1); Colin Lloyd 70', 78' (2/2); Cards: Frans Viljoen (yellow card) 56'; Bernard Rabé (yellow card) 60'	Scoreboard	Try: Chris Jonck 54'; Vuyani Dlomo 57'; Francois Prinsloo 64'; Con: Justin Peach 55', 65' (2/2); Pen: Justin Peach 6', 30' (2/2); Cards: Willie Bower (yellow card) 61'	Attendance: 200; Referee: Jamiel Panday

Bye/s: Boland Cavaliers, Border Bulldogs

==== Round Ten ====
23 September 2004	Falcons	34–59	Leopards	Pam Brink Stadium, Springs
19:00	Try: David de la Port 19'; Jan van der Schyff 24'; Godfrey Mbangeni 29'; Leon Lubbe 60'; Con: Hennie Stapelberg 20', 25', 30', 61' (4/4); Pen: Hennie Stapelberg 9', 15' (2/2)	Scoreboard	Try: Corrie Avenant 5', 46'; Riaan Harmse 17'; Jonathan Mokuena 36', 44'; Frans Viljoen 42', 74'; Colin Lloyd 50'; Con: Corrie Avenant 6', 18', 37', 43', 47', 51', 75' (7/7); Colin Lloyd 45' (1/1); Drop: Corrie Avenant 63' (1/1)	Referee: Johann Meuwesen

25 September 2004	Border Bulldogs	49–31	Griffons	Absa Stadium, East London
15:00	Try: Adam Robertson 1', 35'; Pietie Loots 5'; Dru Nass 15'; Akona Ndungane 33', 53', 63'; Con: Reinhardt Gerber 6', 34', 36', 64' (4/4); Pen: Reinhardt Gerber 22' (1/1); Adam Robertson 76' (1/1); Cards: Reinhardt Gerber (yellow card) 74'	Scoreboard	Try: Schalk de Klerk 60', 68'; Jacques Maritz 75'; Ossie Damons 77'; Con: Slang Roux 78' (1/1); Pen: Ossie Damons 11', 20', 31' (3/3)	Attendance: 1,000; Referee: Marius Jonker

25 September 2004	Mighty Elephants	21–22	Boland Cavaliers	EPRU Stadium, Port Elizabeth
15:00	Try: Justin Peach 3', 59'; Con: Michael Gallinetti 4' (1/1); Pen: Michael Gallinetti 13', 33', 56' (3/3)	Scoreboard	Try: Henley du Plessis 30'; Con: Solly Goosen 31' (1/1); Pen: Solly Goosen 15', 22', 46', 64', 74' (5/5); Cards: David de Villiers (yellow card) 52'	Attendance: 250

==== Round Eleven ====
2 October 2004	Boland Cavaliers	66–17	Falcons	Boland Stadium, Wellington
16:00	Try: Conrad Burke 16', 20', 32', 41'; Gustav Rademeyer 24', 28'; Jongi Nokwe 54'; Piet van Zyl 64'; Vion Wium 74'; Neil Papier 82'; Con: Solly Goosen 17', 21', 25', 42', 55' (5/5); Patrick Petersen 65', 75', 83' (3/3)	Scoreboard	Try: Jan van der Schyff 6', 9'; Skollie de Jager 70'; Con: Ashley Buchler 10' (1/1)	Attendance: 500; Referee: Andrew (Andy) Turner

2 October 2004	Leopards	43–19	Border Bulldogs	Olën Park, Potchefstroom
16:00	Try: Werner Lessing 6'; Riaan Harmse 14'; Cerneels Rautenbach 23'; Frans Viljoen 37', 52', 68'; Jonathan Mokuena 44'; Con: Corrie Avenant 7', 24', 38', 45' (4/4); Cards: Jonathan Mokuena (yellow card) 30'	Scoreboard	Try: Akona Ndungane 39', 40', 76'; Con: Adam Robertson 40' (1/1); Reinhardt Gerber 77' (1/1)	Attendance: 200; Referee: Shaun Veldsman

Bye/s: Griffons, Mighty Elephants

==== Round Twelve ====
8 October 2004	Border Bulldogs	24–19	Boland Cavaliers	Absa Stadium, East London
19:10	Try: Marcel van der Walt 5'; Michael Coetzee 35'; Con: Reinhardt Gerber 36' (1/1); Pen: Reinhardt Gerber 18', 24', 55', 67' (4/4)	Scoreboard	Try: Solly Goosen 44'; Con: Solly Goosen 45' (1/1); Pen: Solly Goosen 10', 33', 39', 54' (4/4)	Attendance: 4,000; Referee: Craig Joubert

9 October 2004	Falcons	39–35	Mighty Elephants	Pam Brink Stadium, Springs
16:00	Try: André Kies 8'; Leon Lubbe 18'; Jacques Nieuwenhuis 61', 68'; Nico Luus 76'; Con: Hennie Stapelberg 9', 19', 62', 77' (4/4); Pen: Hennie Stapelberg 5', 39' (2/2)	Scoreboard	Try: Fabian Juries 6'; Chris Jonck 30'; Michael Gallinetti 53'; Michael Killian 63'; Con: Michael Gallinetti 7', 31', 54' (3/3); Pen: Michael Gallinetti 10', 32', 44' (3/3)	Attendance: 150; Referee: Willie Roos

9 October 2004	Griffons	26–48	Leopards	North West Stadium, Welkom
16:00	Try: Ossie Damons 11'; Schalk de Klerk 58'; JP Joubert 73'; Innes van Rooyen; Con: Ossie Damons 12' (1/1); JP Joubert 59' (1/1); Slang Roux 74' (1/1); Cards: Ossie Damons (yellow card) 22'	Scoreboard	Try: Deon van Rensburg 7'; Jonathan Mokuena 28', 43'; Rayno Hendricks 40'; MJ Mentz 52'; Riaan Heneke 71'; Willie Wepener 76'; Con: Corrie Avenant 41', 44', 53', 72', 77' (5/5); Pen: Corrie Avenant 17' (1/1)	Referee: Deon van Blommestein

=== Title Play-Off Games ===
==== Semi-finals ====
15 October 2004	Border Bulldogs	19–15	Leopards	Absa Stadium, East London
19:10	Try: Michael Coetzee 19'; Con: Reinhardt Gerber 20' (1/1); Pen: Reinhardt Gerber 1', 33', 74' (3/3); Drop: Reinhardt Gerber 75' (1/1); Cards: Michael Coetzee (yellow card) 65'	Scoreboard	Try: Rayno Hendricks 16'; Barry Geel 25'; Con: Corrie Avenant 26' (1/1); Pen: Colin Lloyd 56' (1/1); Cards: Bernard Rabé (yellow card) 65'	Attendance: 4,000; Referee: Andrew (Andy) Turner

16 October 2004	Boland Cavaliers	50–15	Falcons	Boland Stadium, Wellington
15:30	Try: Henley du Plessis 1'; Jongi Nokwe 9', 19', 55'; Antonius Verhoeven 29'; Rayno Benjamin 57'; Kobus Meintjies 66'; Vion Wium 83'; Con: Solly Goosen 20', 30', 56', 58' (4/4); Patrick Petersen 84' (1/1)	Scoreboard	Try: Jan Cloete 43'; Leon Lubbe 50'; Con: Hennie Stapelberg 44' (1/1); Pen: Hennie Stapelberg 40' (1/1); Cards: Jacques Nieuwenhuis (yellow card) 31'	Attendance: 2,000; Referee: Jerome Fortuin

==== Final ====
22 October 2004	Boland Cavaliers	23–22	Border Bulldogs	Boland Stadium, Wellington
16:30	Try: Piet van Zyl 36'; Henley du Plessis 48'; Con: Solly Goosen 37', 49' (2/2); Pen: Solly Goosen 25', 63', 73' (3/3)	Scoreboard	Try: Vusumzi Mbulali 10'; Akona Ndungane 70'; Werner Coetzer 79'; Con: Reinhardt Gerber 11', 71' (2/2); Werner Bester (0/1); Pen: Reinhardt Gerber 50' (1/1)	Attendance: 2,500; Referee: Tappe Henning

2004 Absa Currie Cup
First Division Champions
Boland Cavaliers
3rd title

== Points scorers ==
The following table contain points which have been scored in competitive games in the 2004 Currie Cup First Division.

All point scorers
No	Player	Team	T	C	P	DG	Pts
1	Solly Goosen	Boland Cavaliers	6	28	26	0	164
2	Reinhardt Gerber	Border Bulldogs	0	22	26	1	125
3	Corrie Avenant	Leopards	3	28	12	1	110
4	Hennie Stapelberg	Falcons	0	24	16	2	102
5	Michael Gallinetti	Mighty Elephants	3	10	12	0	71
6	Justin Peach	Mighty Elephants	2	9	14	0	70
7	Ossie Damons	Griffons	11	1	3	0	66
8	Akona Ndungane	Border Bulldogs	10	0	0	0	50
9	Slang Roux	Griffons	2	15	2	0	46
10	Rayno Benjamin	Boland Cavaliers	7	0	0	0	35
10	Jongi Nokwe	Boland Cavaliers	7	0	0	0	35
12	Colin Lloyd	Leopards	3	5	3	0	34
13	Conrad Burke	Boland Cavaliers	6	0	0	0	30
13	Frans Viljoen	Leopards	6	0	0	0	30
15	Willem Slabbert	Griffons	0	5	6	0	28
16	Vuyani Dlomo	Mighty Elephants	5	0	0	0	25
16	Tienie Goosen	Griffons	5	0	0	0	25
16	MJ Mentz	Leopards	5	0	0	0	25
16	Jonathan Mokuena	Leopards	5	0	0	0	25
16	Innes van Rooyen	Griffons	5	0	0	0	25
21	Adam Robertson	Border Bulldogs	2	3	2	0	22
21	Morné van Zyl	Griffons	0	5	4	0	22
23	Patrick Petersen	Boland Cavaliers	0	6	3	0	21
24	Jan Cloete	Falcons	4	0	0	0	20
24	Michael Coetzee	Border Bulldogs	4	0	0	0	20
24	Schalk de Klerk	Griffons	4	0	0	0	20
24	Henley du Plessis	Boland Cavaliers	4	0	0	0	20
24	Leon Lubbe	Falcons	4	0	0	0	20
24	Godfrey Mbangeni	Falcons	4	0	0	0	20
24	Francois Prinsloo	Mighty Elephants	4	0	0	0	20
24	Marcel van der Walt	Border Bulldogs	4	0	0	0	20
24	Piet van Zyl	Boland Cavaliers	4	0	0	0	20
33	Ruan Coetzee	Falcons	2	1	2	0	18
34	Charl Blom	Boland Cavaliers	3	0	0	0	15
34	Skollie de Jager	Falcons	3	0	0	0	15
34	David de la Port	Falcons	3	0	0	0	15
34	Ian Fihlani	Border Bulldogs	3	0	0	0	15
34	Barry Geel	Leopards	3	0	0	0	15
34	Riaan Harmse	Leopards	3	0	0	0	15
34	Fabian Juries	Mighty Elephants	3	0	0	0	15
34	Michael Killian	Mighty Elephants	3	0	0	0	15
34	Nico Luus	Falcons	3	0	0	0	15
34	Dru Nass	Border Bulldogs	3	0	0	0	15
34	Jacques Nieuwenhuis	Falcons	3	0	0	0	15
34	Collen Radebe	Griffons	3	0	0	0	15
34	Sam Willard	Mighty Elephants	3	0	0	0	15
34	Jan van der Schyff	Falcons	3	0	0	0	15
34	Ockie van Zyl	Griffons	3	0	0	0	15
49	Chris Jonck	Mighty Elephants	2	1	0	0	12
49	JP Joubert	Griffons	2	1	0	0	12
51	Werner Coetzer	Border Bulldogs	2	0	0	0	10
51	Jaco Engels	Leopards	2	0	0	0	10
51	Rayno Hendricks	Leopards	2	0	0	0	10
51	Fergus Kennedy	Border Bulldogs	2	0	0	0	10
51	Werner Lessing	Leopards	2	0	0	0	10
51	Pietie Loots	Border Bulldogs	2	0	0	0	10
51	Tiger Mangweni	Border Bulldogs	2	0	0	0	10
51	Jacques Maritz	Griffons	2	0	0	0	10
51	Chris Potgieter	Boland Cavaliers	2	0	0	0	10
51	Gustav Rademeyer	Boland Cavaliers	2	0	0	0	10
51	Cerneels Rautenbach	Leopards	2	0	0	0	10
51	Naas Rossouw	Falcons	2	0	0	0	10
51	Regardt van Eyck	Mighty Elephants	2	0	0	0	10
51	Jaco Venter	Falcons	2	0	0	0	10
51	Antonius Verhoeven	Boland Cavaliers	2	0	0	0	10
51	Raydall Walters	Griffons	2	0	0	0	10
51	Willie Wepener	Leopards	2	0	0	0	10
51	Vion Wium	Boland Cavaliers	2	0	0	0	10
69	Wayne Bennett	Mighty Elephants	1	0	0	0	5
69	Jaco Binneman	Griffons	1	0	0	0	5
69	Deon de Kock	Falcons	0	1	1	0	5
69	David de Villiers	Boland Cavaliers	1	0	0	0	5
69	Henk Eksteen	Boland Cavaliers	1	0	0	0	5
69	Clayton Gawie	Mighty Elephants	1	0	0	0	5
69	Derek Hendry	Border Bulldogs	1	0	0	0	5
69	Riaan Heneke	Leopards	1	0	0	0	5
69	Sebastian Hilpert	Mighty Elephants	1	0	0	0	5
69	Gustav Japhta	Falcons	1	0	0	0	5
69	Wonga Joka	Leopards	1	0	0	0	5
69	Bronwin Julies	Boland Cavaliers	1	0	0	0	5
69	André Kies	Falcons	1	0	0	0	5
69	Charlie King	Leopards	1	0	0	0	5
69	Elroy Ligman	Mighty Elephants	1	0	0	0	5
69	Jacques Lombaard	Falcons	1	0	0	0	5
69	Sarel Lubbe	Falcons	1	0	0	0	5
69	Alastair Lyon	Border Bulldogs	1	0	0	0	5
69	Vusumzi Mbulali	Border Bulldogs	1	0	0	0	5
69	Kobus Meintjies	Boland Cavaliers	1	0	0	0	5
69	Thembani Mkokeli	Border Bulldogs	1	0	0	0	5
69	Zolani Mofu	Border Bulldogs	1	0	0	0	5
69	Neil Papier	Boland Cavaliers	1	0	0	0	5
69	Velile Phiri	Griffons	1	0	0	0	5
69	JJ Pienaar	Mighty Elephants	1	0	0	0	5
69	Pieter Terblanché	Boland Cavaliers	1	0	0	0	5
69	Andries van der Linden	Griffons	1	0	0	0	5
69	Christo van Niekerk	Griffons	1	0	0	0	5
69	Deon van Rensburg	Leopards	1	0	0	0	5
69	Theo van Wyk	Leopards	1	0	0	0	5
99	Jaco Steenberg	Griffons	0	0	1	0	3
100	Ashley Buchler	Falcons	0	1	0	0	2
—	penalty try		1	0	0	0	5
* Legend: T = Tries, C = Conversions, P = Penalties, DG = Drop Goals, Pts = Points

== Cards ==
The following table contains all the cards handed out during the tournament:

Cards
Player	Team	Sent off (straight red)	Temporarily suspended
Bernard Rabé	Leopards	0	2
Henley du Plessis	Boland Cavaliers	0	2
Alastair Lyon	Border Bulldogs	0	1
André Kies	Falcons	0	1
Angelo Brinkhuys	Boland Cavaliers	0	1
Bennie van Blerk	Griffons	0	1
David de Villiers	Boland Cavaliers	0	1
Deon de Kock	Falcons	0	1
Frans Viljoen	Leopards	0	1
Jaco Binneman	Griffons	0	1
Jacques Nieuwenhuis	Falcons	0	1
Jonathan Mokuena	Leopards	0	1
JP Joubert	Griffons	0	1
JJ Pienaar	Mighty Elephants	0	1
Kobus le Roux	Boland Cavaliers	0	1
Tienie Goosen	Griffons	0	1
Michael Coetzee	Border Bulldogs	0	1
MJ Mentz	Leopards	0	1
Nico Luus	Falcons	0	1
Ossie Damons	Griffons	0	1
Ryno Germishuys	Leopards	0	1
Vusumzi Mbulali	Border Bulldogs	0	1
Willie Bower	Mighty Elephants	0	1
* Legend: (red card) = Red card (Sent off for the rest of the game), = Yellow card (Sent off for 10 minutes)

== See also ==
- 2004 Currie Cup Premier Division
- 2004 Vodacom Cup
