= Ronan Loughney =

Irish rugby union player

- Born: Ronan Loughney; 1 November 1984 (age 42) Galway, Ireland
- Height: 1.85 m (6 ft 1 in)
- Weight: 118 kg (18 st 8 lb)
- University: University of Limerick

Rugby union career
- Position: Prop
Amateur team(s)
Years	Team	Apps	(Points)
- Galwegians
–	UL Bohemians		
–	Galwegians		
Senior career
Years	Team	Apps	(Points)
2006–2017	Connacht	184	(20)
- Correct as of 4 December 2020
International career
Years	Team	Apps	(Points)
- Ireland U19
- Ireland U21
2012	Ireland Wolfhounds	1	(0)
2012	Ireland	1	(0)
- Correct as of 9 June 2012

Ronan Loughney (born 1 November 1984) is a retired professional rugby union player from Ireland. He played as a prop. Having started his career playing at loosehead, Loughney moved to tighthead in the 2011–12 season, but primarily played as a loosehead again until his retirement in 2017.

Loughney last played for Irish provincial side Connacht in the Pro14. Loughney was also an international player, having played for Ireland against New Zealand in 2012.

== Early life ==
Born in Galway, Loughney grew up first in Renmore and then the Salthill area of the city. Loughney has family roots in County Mayo, his father being from Kilfian and his mother from Lacken, and he grew up supporting the Mayo Gaelic football team. Loughney is also an Irish language speaker.

Loughney's first rugby team was Galwegians and he first joined the club at the age of seven. Loughney was a student at the University of Limerick and while studying Business and Marketing played for the college's team, UL Bohemians.

== Career ==
=== Connacht ===
Loughney has played for Connacht since 2006, having come through the province's academy. He made his debut for the side during the 2005–06 Celtic League, coming on as a replacement. Loughney made two appearances for the bench that season, with both of these also coming in the league. In the 2006–07 Celtic League, Loughney made two replacement appearances for the side, but did not start or feature in European competition. However, in November 2006, shortly after he turned 21, Loughney suffered a cruciate knee ligament injury which put him out of action for the rest of the season.

Loughney made his return to the side in June 2007, but in his first match back from injury Loughney tore a cruciate knee ligament in the dying moments of Connacht's pre-season friendly against Narbonne in France. Loughney recovered from this setback and made his first start for Connacht on 5 October 2007, when he lined out against Glasgow Warriors in the 2007–08 Celtic League. He then went on to make his first competitive European appearance, coming on as a replacement against El Salvador in the 2007–08 European Challenge Cup on 16 November 2007. Loughney made a total of 15 appearances for the season, three of these coming in the Challenge Cup. He also started a total of three games in the league.

Loughney continued his steady level of appearances for the province the following season. In the 2008–09 Celtic League he played 16 games, starting in seven of them. In the Challenge Cup pool stages he made his first European start, playing against London Irish. Loughney also came on as a replacement in four other pool games, before starting in Connacht's quarter-final defeat to Northampton Saints.

Loughney made fewer domestic appearances in the following season, making five starts and five substitute appearances in the 2009–10 Celtic League. In that year's Challenge Cup Loughney was on the bench for most of Connacht's group games, but started the final group game away to Olympus Madrid. Loughney didn't play in the quarter final against Bourgoin, but came on as a replacement for Brett Wilkinson in the semi-final against Toulon, as Connacht were beaten 19–12 in the Sportsground.

For the 2010–11 season, former Galwegians and Connacht out-half Eric Elwood took over as head coach. Under Elwood, Loughney made 16 appearances in the 2010–11 Celtic League, but made only three starts. Despite starting the important home match against with Harlequins, Loughney was again primarily used as a replacement during the Challenge Cup campaign as Connacht failed to progress from their group.

The 2011–12 season saw a number of changes at Connacht. For the province as a whole it was the first season in the Heineken Cup, the top European rugby competition. Connacht qualified for the 2011–12 Heineken Cup due to Leinster winning the previous season's tournament, which granted Ireland an extra berth. Meanwhile, the squad had lost a number of key players during the preseason through transfers. Among the players to depart the province was first choice tighthead prop, Jamie Hagan, leaving a position open on the starting team. Initially this spot was filled by Rodney Ah You. Loughney made his Heineken Cup debut away to Harlequins on 10 November 2011, coming on as a replacement for Wilkinson. Ah You struggled with his new status as first choice however, and on 10 December 2011 Loughney started his first ever Heineken Cup game, at home to Gloucester in the Sportsground. Loughney started two more matches for the team in the Heineken Cup including the home game to Harlequins, Connacht's first ever win in the competition. His status as first choice carried over into the domestic league, which had been renamed the Pro12, and Loughney played in 20 out of 22 games in the league season, starting 15 times. In March 2012, Loughney played his 100th game for the province, becoming one of the youngest players in the team's history to reach the milestone.

The following season Connacht again participated in the Heineken Cup thanks to Leinster, their fellow Irish side having won a second European title in a row. The addition of Nathan White to the team saw Loughney again used as a replacement in the 2012–13 Heineken Cup, and he came on from the bench in four games. Loughney did start two games in the cup however, including a win over Top 14 side Biarritz. In the 2012–13 Pro12, Loughney started 20 games, but 12 of these appearances came from the bench. Loughney signed an extension to his Connacht deal in November 2012, agreeing to stay with the province until the end of the 2014–15 season.

In the following season, Loughney made only one European appearance, coming on as a replacement in the 2013–14 Heineken Cup match with Italian side Zebre. Loughney also saw less action than in previous seasons in the 2013–14 Pro12, making 16 appearances, 11 of these from the bench.

=== International ===
Early in his career, Loughney represented Ireland internationally at under-age level. He played for both the Under-19 and Under-21 sides, both of which have since been replaced by the Ireland Under-20 team.

Loughney was selected in the senior Ireland squad for the first in the summer of 2012 for the tour to New Zealand. He made his debut in the first test against the All Blacks, coming on as a replacement.
