= Ian Fihlani =

South African rugby union player

- Born: Tsholomnqa, South Africa

Rugby union career
- Position: Winger
Provincial / State sides
Years	Team	Apps	(Points)
1998–07	Border		
National sevens team
Years	Team		Comps
2001–03	South Africa		
Medal record
Men's rugby sevens
Representing South Africa
Commonwealth Games
Bronze medal – third place	2002 Manchester	Team competition

Ian Fihlani is a South African former international rugby union player.

Fihlani comes from Tsholomnqa, a small, rural Eastern Cape village, that is also the birthplace of Springbok Makazole Mapimpi. He was playing with Sunday league team Home Boys when he got scouted to join the Gert Smal-coached Border in 1998. A winger, Fihlani is believed to have scored over 100 tries for Border, but is listed as having crossed 35 times in official matches. He made a Sharks training camp in 2001, with only his inability to speak English costing him a Super 12 place, according to SARFU CEO Mveleli Ncula. In 2002, Fihlani was a member of the South Africa rugby sevens team which claimed a bronze medal at the Commonwealth Games in Manchester.
