= Jonathan Mokuena =

South African rugby union player

- Born: 29 May 1981 (age 45) Cape Town, South Africa
- Height: 6 ft 2 in (188 cm)
- Weight: 215 lb (98 kg)
- School: Voortrekker High School

Rugby union career
- Position: Loose forward
National sevens team
Years	Team	Comps
2005–08	South Africa	
Medal record
Men's rugby sevens
Representing South Africa
World Games
Silver medal – second place	2005 Duisburg	Team competition

Jonathan Mokuena (born 29 May 1981) is a South African former rugby union player.

Born in Cape Town, Mokuena attended Voortrekker High School on a bursary, which is where he picked up rugby.

Mokuena, a loose forward, was an Emerging Springboks representative and national rugby sevens captain. He began at Western Province in the 2002 Currie Cup, before switching two years later to the Leopards when he relocated to Potchefstroom. In 2009, Mokuena was the number eight in the Royal XV which played against the touring 2009 British & Irish Lions, earning man of the match honours for his performance. He captained Griquas to the 2009 Vodacom Cup title and then had two seasons in the Super 14 with the Lions.

In 2016, Mokuena coached the North-West University side to victory in the Varsity Cup.
