= Deon de Kock =

South African rugby union player

- Born: 11 May 1975 (age 51) Empangeni, South Africa
- Height: 6 ft 2 in (188 cm)
- Weight: 175 lb (79 kg)

Rugby union career
- Position: Scrum-half
International career
Years	Team	Apps	(Points)
2001	South Africa	2	(0)

Deon de Kock (born 11 May 1975) is a South African former rugby union international.

De Kock was born in Empangeni and attended Hoërskool Alberton on the East Rand.

A scrum-half, de Kock was capped twice for the Springboks on the 2001 tour of Europe and the United States. He debuted off the bench against Italy in Genoa and was starting scrum-half against the United States in Houston.

De Kock played in the Super 12 for the Bulls and Lions during his career.

== See also ==
- List of South Africa national rugby union players
