= Nico Luus =

South African rugby union player

- Full name: Nicolaas Johannes Luus
- Born: 31 March 1977 (age 49) Klerksdorp, South Africa
- Height: 1.99 m (6 ft 6 1/2 in)
- Weight: 112 kg (17 st 9 lb; 247 lb)
- School: Birchleigh High

Rugby union career
- Position: Lock / Flanker
- Current team: QBR
Amateur team(s)
Years	Team	Apps	(Points)
2013–present	Pretoria Police	14	(20)
Senior career
Years	Team	Apps	(Points)
2001–2009	Falcons		
2009–2010	Golden Lions	17	(0)
2010	Lions	7	(0)
- Correct as of 7 April 2015

Nicolaas Johannes Luus (born 31 March 1977 in Klerksdorp, North West, South Africa) is a South African rugby union player who plays for club side QBR. He previously played for the Falcons in South Africa's domestic rugby competitions. He can play either as a lock or as a flanker.
