= Voortrekker High School (Cape Town) =

Location
- 18 Salisbury Road, Kenilworth; Cape Town, Western Cape, 7708; South Africa
- Coordinates: 33°59′57.6″S 18°28′18.7″E

Information
- School type: Public school
- Established: 1934
- Grades: Grade 8 - Grade 12
- Enrollment: 598 (2016)
- Website: www.voortrekkerhigh.co.za

Voortrekker High School is a school in the Western Cape. The school first opened as an Afrikaans language school for white students in 1934 and was the first such school in the Southern Suburbs area of Cape Town. In 1992 the school was opened to students of all races and became a dual English and Afrikaans language school in 2003. In 2012, due to the declining number of Afrikaans speakers in the Southern Suburbs, the school became an English language medium school only. Originally named the Simon van der Stel Secondary School the name was likely changed to Voortrekker High around 1938.
