= Alastair Lyon =

- Full name: Alastair John Lyon
- Born: 11 October 1979 (age 47) Ficksburg, South Africa
- Height: 1.87 m (6 ft 1 1/2 in)
- Weight: 117 kg (18 st 6 lb; 258 lb)
- School: St. Andrew's School, Bloemfontein
- University: Free State Technikon

Rugby union career
- Position: Prop
- Current team: Richmond
Youth career
- 1995–2001: Griffons
- 2002: Free State Cheetahs
- 2003: Golden Lions
Senior career
Years	Team	Apps	(Points)
2004–2006	Border Bulldogs	51	(5)
2006–2007	Chalon	18	(0)
2007–2008	Bedford Blues	11	(0)
2008–2009	Blackheath	12	(0)
2009–2018	Richmond	121	(5)
- Correct as of 16 August 2016
- Correct as of 16 August 2016

Alastair Lyon (born 11 October 1979) is a South African rugby union player. A prop forward, he has played at Newport Gwent Dragons, Border Bulldogs, Bedford Blues and currently plays semi-professionally for Richmond.

He currently resides in the United Kingdom.
