= Tsholomnqa =

- Interactive map of Tsholomnqa
- Coordinates: 33.161190°S 27.528158°E
- Country: South Africa
- Province: Eastern Cape
- Municipality: Buffalo City
- Time zone: UTC+2 (SAST)

Tsholomnqa is a rural area and village situated in the Buffalo City Metropolitan Municipality in the Eastern Cape in South Africa.

== Geography ==
Situated in the Buffalo City Metropolitan Municipality near East London, it is the home village of the rugby player Makazole Mapimpi.

== History ==
Historic battles involving the Xhosa people took place in this region.

== Notable people ==
- Makazole Mapimpi
