= 2001 South Africa rugby union tour of Europe and the United States =

Summary
P	W	D	L
Total
5	5	0	0
Test match
3	3	0	0
Opponent
P	W	D	L
France
1	0	0	1
Italy
1	1	0	0
England
1	0	0	1
United States
1	1	0	0

The 2001 South Africa rugby union tour of Europe and USA was a series of matches played in November–December 2001 in Europe and USA by South Africa national rugby union team. At the same time the "A" national team also toured Europe.

== Springboks tour ==
Scores and results list South Africa's points tally first.

Opposing Team	For	Against	Date	Venue	Status	Ref.
France	10	20	10 November 2001	Stade de France, Paris	Test match	
Italy	54	26	17 November 2001	Stadio Luigi Ferraris, Genoa	Test match	
England	9	29	24 November 2001	Twickenham, London	Test match	
United States	43	20	1 December 2001	Robertson Stadium, Houston	Test match	

== "A" team tour ==
'Scores and results list South Africa's points tally first.

Opposing Team	For	Against	Date	Venue	Status
France A	23	36	14 November 2001	Tarbes	Tour match
Georgia	31	17	18 November 2001	Tbilisi	Tour match
England Division XV	33	9	21 November 2001	Sixways Stadium, Worcester	Tour match
Spain	28	13	24 November 2001	Seville	Tour match
