= Makazole Mapimpi =

South African rugby union player (born 1990)

- Born: Makazole Mapimpi; 26 July 1990 (age 36) Tsholomnqa, Eastern Cape Province, Republic of South Africa
- Height: 1.84 m (6 ft 1/2 in)
- Weight: 91 kg (201 lb; 14 st 5 lb)
- School: Jim Mvabasa SS School, King William's Town

Rugby union career
- Position: Winger / Centre
- Current team: Sharks / Sharks (Currie Cup)
Youth career
- 2009: Border Bulldogs
Senior career
Years	Team	Apps	(Points)
2014–2016	Border Bulldogs	54	(149)
2017	Southern Kings	14	(55)
2017–2018	Free State Cheetahs	6	(35)
2017–2018	Cheetahs	13	(50)
2018–	Sharks (Currie Cup)	1	(0)
2018–	Sharks	105	(230)
2020–2021	→NTT Red Hurricanes	6	(20)
- Correct as of 9 May 2026
International career
Years	Team	Apps	(Points)
2017	South Africa A	1	(5)
2018–	South Africa	47	(165)
- Correct as of 12 July 2025
Medal record
Men's Rugby 15's
Representing South Africa
Rugby World Cup
Gold medal – first place	2019 Japan	Squad
Gold medal – first place	2023 France	Squad

Makazole Mapimpi (born 26 July 1990) is a South African professional rugby union player for the Sharks in the United Rugby Championship and South Africa national team. He usually plays as a winger or centre. He was part of the winning Springboks of the 2019 Rugby World Cup in Japan and the 2023 Rugby World Cup in France. He became the first South African to score a try in a World Cup final.

== Biography ==
Mapimpi was born in Tsholomnqa, a rural area and village situated in East London in the Eastern Cape province in South Africa in the Amathole District and raised in a rural and poor environment. From being selected into the Springboks in June 2018, he emerged as a best Winger of the year and had a meteoric rise on the international front. At the 2019 Rugby World Cup, South African players were invited to provide photos of their family that would be integrated into the flocked numbers on the back of their jersey. On this occasion, Mapimpi is the only one to give only a picture of himself. When Rassie Erasmus, the coach, asks him why, he admits having nobody left. His parents, as well as his siblings, all died.

== Schooling ==
Mapimpi currently represents The Sharks He has amassed more than 100 senior appearances in all senior competitions.

He attended Jim Mvabasa SS School, King William's Town, in the Eastern Cape of South Africa.

=== Youth ===
As a child, Mapimpi grew up in the Tsholomnqa village. In 2009, Mapimpi was a member of the Border U19 team.

== Club career ==
=== Border Bulldogs ===
Mapimpi was one of several amateur club players brought into the Border Bulldogs provincial set-up at the start of 2014 after the professional side was declared bankrupt. He was included in their squad for the 2014 Vodacom Cup competition and made his debut in their opening match against a Sharks XV. Border lost the match 46–24, but Mapimpi marked his first-class debut with a try shortly after half-time. He also started in their 6–60 loss to Eastern Cape rivals Eastern Province Kings and their next match against Kenyan invitational side Simba XV, scoring the Border Bulldogs' second try in that match to help them to an 18–17 win, their only victory of the competition. He also started the remaining four matches in the competition, scoring his third try of the campaign in their match against the SWD Eagles, as the Border Bulldogs finished bottom of the log.

Mapimpi was retained for their 2014 Currie Cup qualification campaign and he made his debut in the Currie Cup competition by starting their 52–5 opening-day defeat to Griquas. He missed their next match against the Boland Cavaliers, before starting their other four matches in the competition. However, the Border Bulldogs lost all six of their matches to finish bottom of the log and qualified to the 2014 Currie Cup First Division. Mapimpi once again started all five of their matches, including their first match against the Falcons, which turned out to be the Border Bulldogs' only victory of the season as they ran out 19–14 winners. He scored tries in consecutive matches against the SWD Eagles and a Leopards side that eventually finished top of the log but could not prevent the Bulldogs from finished bottom of the log with a single win all season.

Mapimpi returned in the 2015 Vodacom Cup, but ended up on the losing side in their first six matches in the seven-match competition. Mapimpi was the star performer in their final match of the season against the Boland Cavaliers in Alice; he scored a hat-trick of tries and, with regular kicker Masixole Banda unavailable for this match, also took over the kicking duties and slotted three conversions and a penalty. He finished the match with a personal haul of 24 points in the Border Bulldogs' 29–5 victory to help them overtake the Boland Cavaliers on the Southern Section log.

Mapimpi also scored a try three minutes from the end of the Border Bulldogs' first match of the 2015 Currie Cup qualification tournament, with his side causing an upset by beating Griquas – the team that won the qualification tournament in 2014 to earn a spot in the 2014 Currie Cup Premier Division – 20–13 in a match played in East London.

=== Free State Cheetahs ===
In April 2017, the Free State Cheetahs announced that they contracted Mapimpi until the end of the 2018 season. This gave Mapimpi a super chance to profile himself and his skills, resulting in an opportunity to move to the Sharks, being a more prominent Rugby Union.

=== Sharks ===
In January 2023, he was banned for two weeks after being found guilty of making contact with the eyes of Bordeaux Bègles scrum half Maxime Lucu during the 2022–23 Champions Cup. He was banned again, 3 games into his return, for the same offence; admitting he made contact with the eye or eye area of Cardiff hooker Efan Daniel during a 42–22 win in the URC.

== Honours ==
The Sharks - Club Rugby

- 2023/24 EPCR Challenge Cup Winner
- 2024 Currie Cup Championship Winner

South Africa - International Rugby

- 2019 Rugby Championship Winner
- 2019 Rugby World Cup Japan Winner
- 2021 British & Irish Lions tour to South Africa Winner
- 2023 Rugby World Cup France Winner
- 2023 Qatar Airways Cup in Twickenham - Springboks vs All Blacks Winner
- 2024 Qatar Airways Cup in Twickenham - Springboks vs Wales Winner
- 2024 Mandela Challenge Plate - Springboks vs Wallabies Winner
- 2024 Freedom Cup - Springboks vs All Blacks Winner
- 2024 Rugby Championship Winner
- 2024 Prince William Cup - Springboks vs Wales 2024 Autumn Series Winner
- 2025 Rugby Championship winner

== Statistics ==
=== Test match record ===
As of 12 July 2025

Opponent	P	W	D	L	Try	Pts	%Won
Argentina	8	6	0	2	5	25	75
Australia	7	3	0	4	2	10	42.86
British & Irish Lions	3	2	0	1	1	5	66.67
England	3	2	0	1	2	10	66.67
France	1	0	0	1	0	0	0
Ireland	1	0	0	1	0	0	0
Italy	2	2	0	0	2	10	100
Japan	2	2	0	0	5	25	100
Namibia	1	1	0	0	2	10	100
New Zealand	8	3	1	4	2	10	37.5
Portugal	1	1	0	0	3	15	100
Romania	1	1	0	0	3	15	100
Scotland	2	2	0	0	4	20	100
Tonga	1	1	0	0	0	0	100
Wales	6	5	0	1	2	10	83.33
Total	47	31	1	15	33	165	65.96

Pld = Games played, W = Games won, D = Games drawn, L = Games lost, Try = Tries scored, Pts = Points scored

=== International tries ===
As of 12 July 2025

Try	Opposing team	Location	Venue	Competition	Date	Result	Score
1	Wales	Washington, D.C., United States	RFK Stadium	2018 June rugby union tests	2 June 2018	Loss	20–22
2	Argentina	Durban, South Africa	Kings Park Stadium	2018 Rugby Championship	18 August 2018	Win	34–21
3	Argentina	Durban, South Africa	Kings Park Stadium	2018 Rugby Championship	18 August 2018	Win	34–21
4	Australia	Brisbane, Australia	Suncorp Stadium	2018 Rugby Championship	8 September 2018	Loss	23–18
5	Argentina	Salta, Argentina	Estadio Padre Ernesto Martearena	2019 Rugby Championship	10 August 2019	Win	13–46
6	Japan	Kumagaya, Japan	Kumagaya Rugby Stadium	2019 Rugby World Cup warm-up matches	6 September 2019	Win	7–41
7	Japan	Kumagaya, Japan	Kumagaya Rugby Stadium	2019 Rugby World Cup warm-up matches	6 September 2019	Win	7–41
8	Japan	Kumagaya, Japan	Kumagaya Rugby Stadium	2019 Rugby World Cup warm-up matches	6 September 2019	Win	7–41
9	Namibia	Toyota, Japan	Toyta Stadium	2019 Rugby World Cup	28 September 2019	Win	57–3
10	Namibia	Toyota, Japan	Toyta Stadium	2019 Rugby World Cup	28 September 2019	Win	57–3
11	Italy	Shizuoka, Japan	Shizuoka Stadium	2019 Rugby World Cup	4 October 2019	Win	49–3
12	Japan	Chōfu, Japan	Tokyo Stadium	2019 Rugby World Cup	20 October 2019	Win	3–26
13	Japan	Chōfu, Japan	Tokyo Stadium	2019 Rugby World Cup	20 October 2019	Win	3–26
14	England	Yokohama, Japan	International Stadium Yokohama	2019 Rugby World Cup Final	2 November 2019	Win	12–32
15	British & Irish Lions	Cape Town, South Africa	Cape Town Stadium	2021 British & Irish Lions Tour to South Africa	31 July 2021	Win	27–9
16	Argentina	Port Elizabeth, South Africa	Nelson Mandela Bay Stadium	2021 Rugby Championship	21 August 2021	Win	29–10
17	New Zealand	Gold Coast, Australia	Robina Stadium	2021 Rugby Championship	2 October 2021	Win	31–29
18	Scotland	Edinburgh, Scotland	Murrayfield Stadium	2021 Autumn Nations Series	13 November 2021	Win	15–30
19	Scotland	Edinburgh, Scotland	Murrayfield Stadium	2021 Autumn Nations Series	13 November 2021	Win	15–30
20	England	London, England	Twickenham Stadium	2021 Autumn Nations Series	20 November 2021	Loss	27–26
21	New Zealand	Johannesburg, South Africa	Emirates Airline Park	2022 Rugby Championship	13 August 2022	Loss	23–35
22	Australia	Sydney, Australia	Sydney Football Stadium	2022 Rugby Championship	3 September 2022	Win	8–24
23	Argentina	Buenos Aires, Argentina	Estadio José Amalfitani	2023 Rugby World Cup warm-up matches	5 August 2023	Win	13–24
24	Romania	Bordeaux, France	Stade de Bordeaux	2023 Rugby World Cup	17 September 2023	Win	76–0
25	Romania	Bordeaux, France	Stade de Bordeaux	2023 Rugby World Cup	17 September 2023	Win	76–0
26	Romania	Bordeaux, France	Stade de Bordeaux	2023 Rugby World Cup	17 September 2023	Win	76–0
27	Wales	London, England	Twickenham Stadium	2024 June test	22 June 2024	Win	41–13
28	Portugal	Bloemfontein, South Africa	Free State Stadium	2024 mid-year tests	20 July 2024	Win	64–21
29	Portugal	Bloemfontein, South Africa	Free State Stadium	2024 mid-year tests	20 July 2024	Win	64–21
30	Portugal	Bloemfontein, South Africa	Free State Stadium	2024 mid-year tests	20 July 2024	Win	64–21
31	Scotland	Edinburgh, Scotland	Murrayfield Stadium	2024 end-of-year rugby union internationals	10 November 2024	Win	15–32
32	Scotland	Edinburgh, Scotland	Murrayfield Stadium	2024 end-of-year rugby union internationals	10 November 2024	Win	15–32
33	Italy	Gqeberha, South Africa	Nelson Mandela Bay Stadium	2025 Italy tour of South Africa	12 July 2025	Win	45–0
