= Sam Willard =

American basketball player (born 1988)

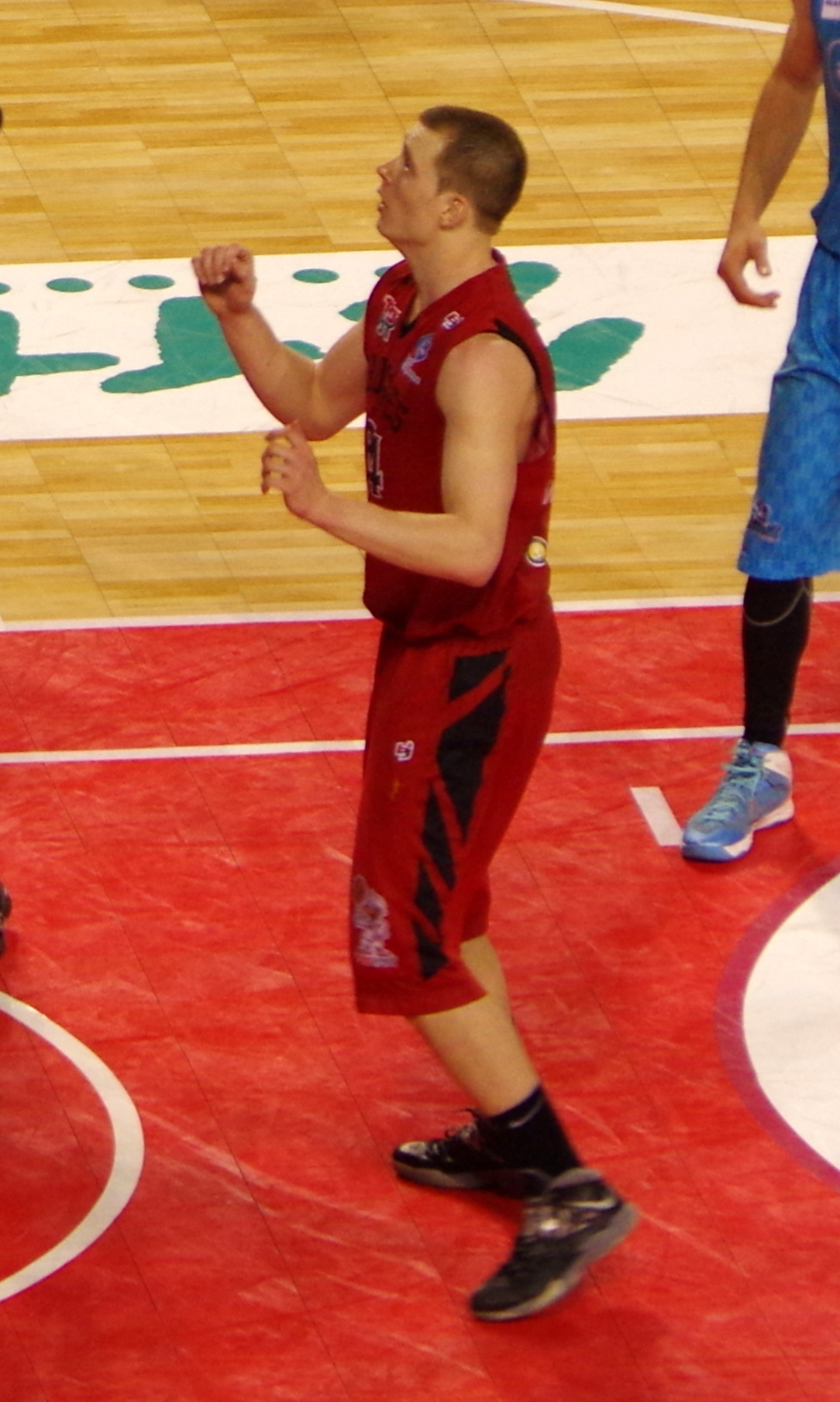

Personal information
- Born: September 7, 1988 (age 38) Elyria, Ohio, U.S.
- Listed height: 6 ft 9 in (2.06 m)
- Listed weight: 225 lb (102 kg)

Career information
- High school: T.F. Riggs (Pierre, South Dakota)
- College: University of the Pacific (2007–2011)
- NBA draft: 2011: undrafted
- Playing career: 2011–2018
- Position: Power forward / center
- Number: 34

Career history
- 2011–2012: BK Ventspils
- 2012–2013: Sendai 89ers
- 2013–2018: Toyama Grouses

Samuel Steven Willard (born September 9, 1988) is an American former professional basketball player who last played for Toyama Grouses in Japan. He played college basketball for University of the Pacific.

== Career statistics ==
Legend
GP	Games played	GS	Games started	MPG	Minutes per game
FG%	Field goal percentage	3P%	3-point field goal percentage	FT%	Free throw percentage
RPG	Rebounds per game	APG	Assists per game	SPG	Steals per game
BPG	Blocks per game	PPG	Points per game	**Bold**	Career high

Year	Team	GP	GS	MPG	FG%	3P%	FT%	RPG	APG	SPG	BPG	PPG
2012–13	Sendai	50	50	35.4	.532	.250	.667	14.0	2.2	1.2	0.6	10.4
2013–14	Toyama	52	52	32.7	.522	.318	.708	12.5	1.7	1.0	0.7	11.2
2014–15	Toyama	52	52	33.3	.518	.304	.741	12.0	2.4	1.4	1.0	13.2
2015–16	Toyama	49	48	33.3	.524	.374	.682	13.1	2.4	1.0	0.9	15.4
2016–17	Toyama	60	54	27.7	.505	.243	.771	9.6	1.6	1.1	0.7	12.1
2017–18	Toyama	58	48	24.4	.436	.345	.844	8.2	2.0	0.8	0.7	10.4
