= Barry Geel =

South African rugby union footballer

- Full name: Albertus Daniël Geel
- Born: 30 April 1982 (age 44) Springs, South Africa
- Height: 1.85 m (6 ft 1 in)
- Weight: 92 kg (14 st 7 lb; 203 lb)
- School: FH Odendaal High School
- University: Intec College

Rugby union career
- Position: Centre
- Current team: Free State Cheetahs
Senior career
Years	Team	Apps	(Points)
2002–2006	Leopards	91	(105)
2007–2011	Griquas	80	(130)
2010–present	Cheetahs	8	(0)
2012–present	Free State Cheetahs	10	(15)
- Correct as of 29 July 2013

Barry Geel (born 30 April 1982) is a South African rugby union footballer. He regularly plays as a centre.

== Career ==
Geel started out his career with the Leopards in 2002 and had four years in Potchefstroom before switching to the Griquas in 2007. He spent another four years with the Peacock Blues, making 76 appearances and scoring 23 tries. He earned his first call up to Super Rugby with the Cheetahs in 2010 and eventually switched provinces to the Free State Cheetahs in 2012.
