= 2008–09 European Challenge Cup pool stage =

- Season: 2008–09 European Challenge Cup
- Date: 9 October 2008 – 25 January 2009

Qualifiers
- Seed 1: (England) London Irish
- Seed 2: (England) Northampton Saints
- Seed 3: (England) Saracens
- Seed 4: (England) Worcester Warriors
- Seed 5: (France) Brive
- Seed 6: (England) Newcastle Falcons
- Seed 7: (Ireland) Connacht
- Seed 8: (France) Bourgoin

The 2008–09 European Challenge Cup pool stage was the opening stage of the 13th season of the European Challenge Cup, the second-tier competition for European rugby union clubs. It began on 9 October 2008 when RC Toulon hosted Northampton Saints and ended with two games on 25 January 2009.

Twenty teams participated in this phase of the competition; they were divided into five pools of four teams each, with each team playing the others home and away. Competition points were earned using the standard bonus point system. The five pool winners and the best three runners-up advanced to the knockout stage. These teams then competed in a single-elimination tournament that ended with the final at the Twickenham Stoop in London on 22 May 2009.

== Results ==
The draw for the pool stages took place on 23 June 2008. The draw was conducted using the ERC European Ranking system which was based on the qualified teams' performances and participation in the Heineken Cup and knock-out stages of the European Challenge Cup over the past four seasons.

All times are local to the game location.

Key to colours
Winner of each pool, advance to quarterfinals. Seed # in parentheses
Three highest-scoring second-place teams advance to quarterfinals. Seed # in parentheses

=== Pool 1 ===
Team	P	W	D	L	Tries for	Tries against	Try diff	Points for	Points against	Points diff	TB	LB	Pts
(England) London Irish (1)	6	6	0	0	44	3	+41	300	34	+266	5	0	29
(Ireland) Connacht (7)	6	4	0	2	20	19	+1	159	140	+19	3	0	19
(Italy) Rovigo	6	1	0	5	7	25	−18	79	199	–120	0	1	5
(France) Dax	6	1	0	5	5	29	−24	55	220	–165	0	0	4

10 October 2008
19:00

Dax (France)	12–30	(Ireland) Connacht

Stade Maurice Boyau, Dax

11 October 2008
15:00

London Irish (England)	78–3	(Italy) Rovigo

Madejski Stadium, Reading

17 October 2008
19:00

Connacht (Ireland)	10–27	(England) London Irish

Galway Sportsgrounds, Galway

18 October 2008
15:00

Rovigo (Italy)	24–11	(France) Dax

Stadio Comunale Mario Battaglini, Rovigo

5 December 2008
19:00

Dax (France)	0–38	(England) London Irish

Stade Maurice Boyau, Dax

6 December 2008
15:00

Rovigo (Italy)	20–35	(Ireland) Connacht

Stadio Comunale Mario Battaglini, Rovigo

11 December 2008
19:45

London Irish (England)	59–7	(France) Dax

Madejski Stadium, Reading

12 December 2008
18:30

Connacht (Ireland)	30–3	(Italy) Rovigo

Galway Sportsgrounds, Galway

16 January 2009
19:00

Dax (France)	22–20	(Italy) Rovigo

Stade Maurice Boyau, Dax

17 January 2009
15:00

London Irish (England)	75–5	(Ireland) Connacht

Madejski Stadium, Reading

23 January 2009
18:30

Connacht (Ireland)	49–3	(France) Dax

Galway Sportsgrounds, Galway

24 January 2009
15:00

Rovigo (Italy)	9–23	(England) London Irish

Stadio Comunale Mario Battaglini, Rovigo

=== Pool 2 ===
Team	P	W	D	L	Tries for	Tries against	Try diff	Points for	Points against	Points diff	TB	LB	Pts
(England) Northampton Saints (2)	6	6	0	0	37	7	+30	278	69	+209	5	0	29
(England) Bristol	6	3	0	3	14	21	−7	140	168	−28	1	1	14
(France) Montpellier	6	2	0	4	10	18	−8	101	159	−58	0	1	9
(France) RC Toulon	6	1	0	5	7	22	−15	84	207	−123	0	1	5

9 October 2008
20:45

Toulon (France)	3–56	(England) Northampton Saints

Stade Mayol, Toulon

10 October 2008
19:00

Montpellier (France)	33–15	(England) Bristol

Stade Yves-du-Manoir, Montpellier

17 October 2008
19:45

Bristol (England)	39–11	(France) Toulon

Memorial Ground, Bristol

18 October 2008
19:45

Northampton Saints (England)	51–7	(France) Montpellier

Franklin's Gardens, Northampton

4 December 2008
20:45

Montpellier (France)	14–10	(France) Toulon

Stade Yves-du-Manoir, Montpellier

6 December 2008
15:00

Northampton Saints (England)	66–3	(England) Bristol

Franklin's Gardens, Northampton

13 December 2008
20:45

Toulon (France)	30–9	(France) Montpellier

Stade Mayol, Toulon

14 December 2008
15:00

Bristol (England)	21–25	(England) Northampton Saints

Memorial Ground, Bristol

15 January 2009
20:45

Montpellier (France)	24–28	(England) Northampton Saints

Stade Yves-du-Manoir, Montpellier

16 January 2009
18:30

Toulon (France)	19–37	(England) Bristol

Stade Mayol, Toulon

24 January 2009
15:00

Northampton Saints (England)	52–11	(France) Toulon

Franklin's Gardens, Northampton

25 January 2009
15:00

Bristol (England)	25–14	(France) Montpellier

Memorial Ground, Bristol

=== Pool 3 ===
Team	P	W	D	L	Tries for	Tries against	Try diff	Points for	Points against	Points diff	TB	LB	Pts
(England) Worcester Warriors (4)	6	5	0	1	36	8	+28	255	94	+161	4	0	24
(France) Bourgoin (8)	6	3	0	3	18	11	+7	158	115	+43	1	2	15
(Italy) Petrarca Padova	6	3	0	3	11	28	−17	112	206	−94	0	1	13
(Romania) București Oaks	6	1	0	5	8	26	−18	87	197	−110	0	1	5

11 October 2008
15:00

Petrarca Padova (Italy)	6–55	(England) Worcester Warriors

Stadio Plebiscito, Padua

12 October 2008
16:30

București Oaks (Romania)	10–21	(France) Bourgoin

Stadionul Naţional de Rugby, Bucharest

17 October 2008
20:30

Bourgoin (France)	28–29	(Italy) Petrarca Padova

Stade Pierre Rajon, Bourgoin

19 October 2008
16:30

București Oaks (Romania)	17–53	(England) Worcester Warriors

Stadionul Naţional de Rugby, Bucharest

5 December 2008
20:30

Bourgoin (France)	29–14	(England) Worcester Warriors

Stade Pierre Rajon, Bourgoin

7 December 2008
13:00

București Oaks (Romania)	14–20	(Italy) Petrarca Padova

Stadionul Naţional de Rugby, Bucharest

13 December 2008
13:00

Petrarca Padova (Italy)	15–17	(Romania) București Oaks

Stadio Plebiscito, Padua

13 December 2008
15:00

Worcester Warriors (England)	27–6	(France) Bourgoin

Sixways Stadium, Worcester

17 January 2009
15:00

Petrarca Padova (Italy)	25–24	(France) Bourgoin

Stadio Plebiscito, Padua

17 January 2009
15:00

Worcester Warriors (England)	38–19	(Romania) București Oaks

Sixways Stadium, Worcester

23 January 2009
20:30

Bourgoin (France)	50–10	(Romania) București Oaks

Stade Pierre Rajon, Bourgoin

24 January 2009
15:00

Worcester Warriors (England)	68–17	(Italy) Petrarca Padova

Sixways Stadium, Worcester

=== Pool 4 ===
Team	P	W	D	L	Tries for	Tries against	Try diff	Points for	Points against	Points diff	TB	LB	Pts
(France) Brive (5)	6	5	0	1	33	8	+25	243	89	+154	3	1	24
(England) Newcastle Falcons (6)	6	4	0	2	24	8	+16	178	90	+88	2	1	19
(Italy) Overmach Parma	6	3	0	3	19	13	+6	165	120	+45	2	2	16
(Spain) El Salvador	6	0	0	6	5	52	−47	46	333	−287	0	0	0

11 October 2008
18:30

Newcastle Falcons (England)	63–0	(Spain) El Salvador

Kingston Park, Newcastle

12 October 2008
14:30

Overmach Parma (Italy)	34–29	(France) Brive

Stadio XXV Aprile, Parma

16 October 2008
20:45

Brive (France)	36–22	(England) Newcastle Falcons

Stade Amédée Domenech, Brive

19 October 2008
12:30

El Salvador (Spain)	21–59	(Italy) Overmach Parma

Estadio Pepe Rojo, Valladolid

5 December 2008
19:30

Brive (France)	84–6	(Spain) El Salvador

Stade Amédée Domenech, Brive

6 December 2008
14:30

Overmach Parma (Italy)	14–20	(England) Newcastle Falcons

Stadio XXV Aprile, Parma

14 December 2008
12:30

El Salvador (Spain)	5–55	(France) Brive

Estadio Pepe Rojo, Valladolid

14 December 2008
15:00

Newcastle Falcons (England)	21–16	(Italy) Overmach Parma

Kingston Park, Newcastle

17 January 2009
14:30

Overmach Parma (Italy)	29–0	(Spain) El Salvador

Stadio XXV Aprile, Parma

17 January 2009
19:40

Newcastle Falcons (England)	9–10	(France) Brive

Kingston Park, Newcastle

22 January 2009
20:45

Brive (France)	29–13	(Italy) Overmach Parma

Stade Amédée Domenech, Brive

25 January 2009
12:00

El Salvador (Spain)	14–43	(England) Newcastle Falcons

Estadio Pepe Rojo, Valladolid

=== Pool 5 ===
Team	P	W	D	L	Tries for	Tries against	Try diff	Points for	Points against	Points diff	TB	LB	Pts
(England) Saracens (3)	6	6	0	0	20	1	+19	200	43	+157	2	0	26
(Italy) Viadana	6	3	0	3	8	11	−3	120	126	−6	0	1	13
(France) Bayonne	6	3	0	3	9	11	−2	99	122	−23	0	0	12
(France) Mont-de-Marsan	6	0	0	0	4	18	−14	54	182	−128	0	1	1

10 October 2008
19:30

Bayonne (France)	10–21	(Italy) Viadana

Stade Jean Dauger, Bayonne

12 October 2008
15:00

Saracens (England)	53–3	(France) Mont-de-Marsan

Vicarage Road, Watford

17 October 2008
19:00

Mont-de-Marsan (France)	8–26	(France) Bayonne

Stade Guy Boniface, Mont-de-Marsan

18 October 2008
19:00

Viadana (Italy)	12–35	(England) Saracens

Stadio Luigi Zaffanella, Viadana

6 December 2008
15:30

Mont-de-Marsan (France)	15–21	(Italy) Viadana

Stade Guy Boniface, Mont-de-Marsan

6 December 2008
20:45

Bayonne (France)	6–16	(England) Saracens

Stade Jean Dauger, Bayonne

13 December 2008
19:00

Viadana (Italy)	25–6	(France) Mont-de-Marsan

Stadio Luigi Zaffanella, Viadana

14 December 2008
15:00

Saracens (England)	36–0	(France) Bayonne

Vicarage Road, Watford

16 January 2009

Bayonne (France)	33–19	(France) Mont-de-Marsan
	19:30

Stade Jean Dauger, Bayonne

18 January 2009
15:00

Saracens (England)	36–19	(Italy) Viadana

Vicarage Road, Watford

23 January 2009
19:00

Mont-de-Marsan (France)	3–24	(England) Saracens

Stade Guy Boniface, Mont-de-Marsan

24 January 2009
19:00

Viadana (Italy)	22–24	(France) Bayonne

Stadio Luigi Zaffanella, Viadana

== Seeding and runners-up ==
Seed	Pool Winners	Pts	TF	+/-
1	(England) London Irish	29	44	+266
2	(England) Northampton Saints	29	37	+209
3	(England) Saracens	26	20	+157
4	(England) Worcester Warriors	24	36	+161
5	(France) Brive	24	33	+154
Seed	Pool Runners-up	Pts	TF	+/-
6	(England) Newcastle Falcons	19	24	+88
7	(Ireland) Connacht	19	20	+19
8	(France) Bourgoin	15	18	+43
–	(England) Bristol	14	14	−28
–	(Italy) Viadana	13	8	−6

== See also ==
- European Challenge Cup
- 2008–09 Heineken Cup
