= 2002 Vodacom Cup =

- Champions: Golden Lions
- Matches played: 73

The 2002 Vodacom Cup was the 5th edition of this annual domestic cup competition. The Vodacom Cup is played between provincial rugby union teams in South Africa from the Currie Cup Premier and First Divisions.

== Competition ==
There were 14 teams participating in the 2002 Vodacom Cup. These teams were divided into two sections of equal strength; Section X and Section Y, both with seven teams. Teams would play all the other teams in their section once over the course of the season, either at home or away.

Teams received four points for a win and two points for a draw. Bonus points were awarded to teams that score four or more tries in a game, as well as to teams losing a match by seven points or less. Teams were ranked by points, then points difference (points scored less points conceded).

The top four teams in each section qualified for the Vodacom Top Eight competition, while the bottom three teams in Sections X and Y qualified for the Vodacom Shield competition. For both the Vodacom Top Eight and Vodacom Shield competitions, all points already scored against teams that progressed to the same competition were carried forward. Teams then played once against the teams that qualified from the other section, with the top four teams in each competition advancing to the quarter-finals.

In the quarter finals, the teams that finished first in each competition had home advantage against the teams that finished fourth and the teams that finished second in each competition had home advantage against the teams that finished third. The winners of these quarter finals then played each other in the semi-finals, with the higher placed team having home advantage. The two semi-final winners then met in the final for each competition.

The top six teams in the Vodacom Top Eight competition and the top team in the Vodacom Shield competition qualified for the 2003 Vodacom Cup, while the bottom two teams in the Vodacom Top Eight competition and remaining five teams in the Vodacom Shield competition qualified for the lesser 2003 Vodacom Shield competition.

== Teams ==
Location of teams in 2002 Vodacom Cup
Section X
Section Y

=== Changes from 2001 ===
- The Welwitschias withdrew from the competition.

=== Team Listing ===
The following teams took part in the 2002 Vodacom Cup competition:

Section X
Team	Stadium/s
Boland Cavaliers	Boland Stadium, Wellington
Boland Cavaliers	Esselen Park, Worcester
Falcons	Barnard Stadium, Kempton Park
Falcons	Nigel
Falcons	Pam Brink Stadium, Springs
Golden Lions	Ellis Park Stadium, Johannesburg
Golden Lions	Johannesburg Stadium, Johannesburg
Golden Lions	Bill Jardine Stadium, Johannesburg
Griffons	North West Stadium, Welkom
Mighty Elephants	Boet Erasmus Stadium, Port Elizabeth
Natal	Absa Stadium, Durban
Natal	Woodburn Stadium, Pietermaritzburg
Natal	Durban High School
Free State Cheetahs	Vodacom Park, Bloemfontein

Section Y
Team	Stadium/s
Blue Bulls	Loftus Versfeld, Pretoria
Blue Bulls	Pietersburg
Leopards	Olën Park, Potchefstroom
Leopards	Phokeng
Western Province	Newlands Stadium, Cape Town
Western Province	Florida Park, Parow
Griquas	Griqua Park, Kimberley
Pumas	@lantic Park, Witbank
Border Bulldogs	Absa Stadium, East London
Border Bulldogs	Sisa Dukashe Stadium, Mdantsane
SWD Eagles	Outeniqua Park, George

== Pool Phases ==
=== Tables ===
==== Section X ====
2002 Vodacom Cup Section X Table
	Team	Played	Won	Drawn	Lost	Points For	Points Against	Points Difference	Tries For	Tries Against	Try Bonus	Losing Bonus	Points
1	Golden Lions	6	6	0	0	229	142	+87	29	17	4	0	28
2	Free State Cheetahs	6	4	0	2	220	166	+54	28	20	5	2	23
3	Falcons	6	3	1	2	207	165	+42	26	19	3	1	18
4	Boland Cavaliers	6	2	1	3	143	170	-27	19	19	4	1	15
5	Natal	6	2	1	3	142	181	-39	17	23	1	0	11
6	Mighty Elephants	6	1	1	4	149	142	+7	17	18	1	1	8
7	Griffons	6	1	0	5	141	265	-124	15	35	0	1	5
The top 4 teams qualified for the Vodacom Top Eight. The bottom 3 teams qualified for the Vodacom Shield. Points breakdown: *4 points for a win *2 points for a draw *1 bonus point for a loss by seven points or less *1 bonus point for scoring four or more tries in a match

==== Section Y ====
2002 Vodacom Cup Section Y Table
	Team	Played	Won	Drawn	Lost	Points For	Points Against	Points Difference	Tries For	Tries Against	Try Bonus	Losing Bonus	Points
1	Blue Bulls	6	5	0	1	260	157	+103	38	20	5	1	26
2	Border Bulldogs	6	6	0	0	166	112	+54	17	12	1	0	25
3	Leopards	6	4	0	2	245	153	+92	35	18	4	1	21
4	Pumas	6	3	0	3	199	208	-9	24	24	3	1	16
5	SWD Eagles	6	2	0	4	181	234	-53	21	29	3	1	12
6	Griquas	6	1	0	5	164	236	-72	19	30	3	3	10
7	Western Province	6	0	0	6	168	283	-115	18	39	3	2	5
The top 4 teams qualified for the Vodacom Top Eight. The bottom 3 teams qualified for the Vodacom Shield. Points breakdown: *4 points for a win *2 points for a draw *1 bonus point for a loss by seven points or less *1 bonus point for scoring four or more tries in a match

=== Results ===
==== Section X ====
===== Round one =====
2002-02-20	Falcons	26–26	Mighty Elephants	Barnard Stadium, Kempton Park
		Scoreboard

2002-02-21	Golden Lions	41–24	Boland Cavaliers	Bill Jardine Stadium, Johannesburg
		Scoreboard

2002-02-23	Free State Cheetahs	49–27	Griffons	Vodacom Park, Bloemfontein
		Scoreboard

===== Round two =====
2002-02-27	Free State Cheetahs	45–17	Natal	Vodacom Park, Bloemfontein
		Scoreboard

2002-03-03	Griffons	14–58	Golden Lions	North West Stadium, Welkom
		Scoreboard

2002-03-03	Boland Cavaliers	43–21	Falcons	Boland Stadium, Wellington
		Scoreboard

===== Round three =====
2002-03-07	Natal	25–39	Golden Lions	Kings Park Stadium, Durban
		Scoreboard

2002-03-10	Mighty Elephants	37–0	Boland Cavaliers	Boet Erasmus Stadium, Port Elizabeth
		Scoreboard

2002-03-10	Falcons	61–19	Griffons	Nigel
		Scoreboard

===== Round four =====
2002-03-13	Griffons	29–20	Mighty Elephants	North West Stadium, Welkom
		Scoreboard

2002-03-13	Golden Lions	36–35	Free State Cheetahs	Ellis Park Stadium, Johannesburg
		Scoreboard

2002-03-14	Natal	23–41	Falcons	Kings Park Stadium, Durban
		Scoreboard

===== Round Five =====
2002-03-20	Mighty Elephants	18–20	Natal	Boet Erasmus Stadium, Port Elizabeth
		Scoreboard

2002-03-24	Falcons	32–26	Free State Cheetahs	Barnard Stadium, Kempton Park
		Scoreboard

2002-03-24	Boland Cavaliers	36–30	Griffons	Esselen Park, Worcester
		Scoreboard

===== Round Six =====
2002-03-29	Free State Cheetahs	40–30	Mighty Elephants	Vodacom Park, Bloemfontein
		Scoreboard

2002-03-29	Natal	16–16	Boland Cavaliers	Woodburn Stadium, Pietermaritzburg
		Scoreboard

2002-03-29	Golden Lions	28–26	Falcons	Ellis Park Stadium, Johannesburg
		Scoreboard

===== Round Seven =====
2002-04-04	Boland Cavaliers	24–25	Free State Cheetahs	Boland Stadium, Wellington
		Scoreboard

2002-04-06	Griffons	22–41	Natal	North West Stadium, Welkom
		Scoreboard

2002-04-06	Mighty Elephants	18–27	Golden Lions	Boet Erasmus Stadium, Port Elizabeth
		Scoreboard

==== Section Y ====
===== Round one =====
2002-02-20	Leopards	35–11	SWD Eagles	Olën Park, Potchefstroom
		Scoreboard

2002-02-21	Blue Bulls	52–20	Griquas	Loftus Versfeld, Pretoria
	Try: Derick Hougaard, Fourie du Preez (2), Francois van Schouwenburg, JP Nel (2), Pedrie Wannenburg, Tiaan Joubert; Con: Derick Hougaard (6)	Scoreboard	Try: David Manuel, Louis Loubser (2); Con: Quintin Jean van Tonder; Pen: Quintin Jean van Tonder

2002-02-23	Border Bulldogs	23–10	Western Province	Absa Stadium, East London
		Scoreboard

===== Round two =====
2002-02-28	SWD Eagles	27–34	Border Bulldogs	Outeniqua Park, George
		Scoreboard

2002-02-28	Western Province	18–58	Pumas	Newlands Stadium, Cape Town
		Scoreboard

2002-03-03	Griquas	35–41	Leopards	Griqua Park, Kimberley
		Scoreboard

===== Round three =====
2002-03-06	Pumas	45–27	SWD Eagles	@lantic Park, Witbank
		Scoreboard

2002-03-09	Border Bulldogs	40–16	Griquas	Absa Stadium, East London
		Scoreboard

2002-03-10	Leopards	15–32	Blue Bulls	Phokeng
		Scoreboard

===== Round four =====
2002-03-13	Griquas	16–23	Pumas	Griqua Park, Kimberley
		Scoreboard

2002-03-14	SWD Eagles	42–37	Western Province	Outeniqua Park, George
		Scoreboard

2002-03-14	Blue Bulls	22–23	Border Bulldogs	Loftus Versfeld, Pretoria
		Scoreboard

===== Round Five =====
2002-03-21	Pumas	35–48	Blue Bulls	@lantic Park, Witbank
		Scoreboard

2002-03-21	Western Province	37–40	Griquas	Newlands Stadium, Cape Town
		Scoreboard

2002-03-24	Border Bulldogs	22–19	Leopards	Sisa Dukashe Stadium, Mdantsane
		Scoreboard

===== Round Six =====
2002-03-26	Griquas	37–43	SWD Eagles	Griqua Park, Kimberley
		Scoreboard

2002-03-28	Blue Bulls	60–33	Western Province	Loftus Versfeld, Pretoria
		Scoreboard

2002-03-31	Leopards	75–20	Pumas	Phokeng
		Scoreboard

===== Round Seven =====
2002-04-03	Pumas	18–24	Border Bulldogs	@lantic Park, Witbank
		Scoreboard

2002-04-04	SWD Eagles	31–46	Blue Bulls	Outeniqua Park, George
		Scoreboard

2002-04-07	Western Province	33–60	Leopards	Newlands Stadium, Cape Town
		Scoreboard

== Vodacom Top Eight ==
=== Table ===
2002 Vodacom Top Eight Table
	Team	Played	Won	Drawn	Lost	Points For	Points Against	Points Difference	Tries For	Tries Against	Try Bonus	Losing Bonus	Points
1	Golden Lions	7	6	0	1	270	211	+59	32	25	4	0	28
2	Boland Cavaliers	7	4	0	3	222	201	+21	29	27	6	1	23
3	Blue Bulls	7	4	0	3	242	240	+2	32	29	4	1	21
4	Falcons	7	4	0	3	208	196	+12	26	23	3	1	20
5	Free State Cheetahs	7	3	1	3	193	185	+8	21	22	3	3	20
6	Leopards	7	3	1	3	224	170	+54	28	18	3	3	18
7	Border Bulldogs	7	3	0	4	150	179	-29	15	23	0	1	13
8	Pumas	7	0	0	7	169	296	-127	21	37	3	1	4
The top 4 teams qualified for the Vodacom Cup semi-finals. The bottom 2 teams relegated to the 2003 Vodacom Shield. Points breakdown: All results from the pool phases were brought forward. *4 points for a win *2 points for a draw *1 bonus point for a loss by seven points or less *1 bonus point for scoring four or more tries in a match

=== Results ===
==== Round one ====
2002-04-10	Pumas	14–31	Falcons	@lantic Park, Witbank
		Scoreboard

2002-04-10	Border Bulldogs	6–10	Free State Cheetahs	Absa Stadium, East London
		Scoreboard

2002-04-11	Blue Bulls	27–63	Golden Lions	Pietersburg
		Scoreboard

2002-04-11	Leopards	10–26	Boland Cavaliers	Olën Park, Potchefstroom
		Scoreboard

==== Round two ====
2002-04-17	Free State Cheetahs	36–42	Blue Bulls	Vodacom Park, Bloemfontein
		Scoreboard

2002-04-18	Golden Lions	49–33	Border Bulldogs	Ellis Park Stadium, Johannesburg
		Scoreboard

2002-04-18	Falcons	36–49	Leopards	Pam Brink Stadium, Springs
		Scoreboard

2002-04-18	Boland Cavaliers	38–27	Pumas	Boland Stadium, Wellington
		Scoreboard

==== Round three ====
2002-04-24	Pumas	22–38	Free State Cheetahs	@lantic Park, Witbank
		Scoreboard

2002-04-24	Border Bulldogs	15–23	Falcons	Absa Stadium, East London
		Scoreboard

2002-04-25	Leopards	33–11	Golden Lions	Olën Park, Potchefstroom
		Scoreboard

2002-04-25	Blue Bulls	50–29	Boland Cavaliers	Loftus Versfeld, Pretoria
		Scoreboard

==== Round four ====
2002-05-01	Free State Cheetahs	23–23	Leopards	Vodacom Park, Bloemfontein
		Scoreboard

2002-05-02	Falcons	39–21	Blue Bulls	Pam Brink Stadium, Springs
		Scoreboard

2002-05-02	Boland Cavaliers	37–28	Border Bulldogs	Boland Stadium, Wellington
		Scoreboard

2002-05-02	Golden Lions	42–33	Pumas	Ellis Park Stadium, Johannesburg
		Scoreboard

==== Semi-finals ====
2002-05-08	Boland Cavaliers	45–47	Blue Bulls	Boland Stadium, Wellington
		Scoreboard

2002-05-09	Golden Lions	36–17	Falcons	Johannesburg Stadium, Johannesburg
		Scoreboard

==== Final ====
2002-05-16	Golden Lions	54–38	Blue Bulls	Ellis Park Stadium, Johannesburg
		Scoreboard

=== Winners ===
2002
Vodacom Cup
CHAMPIONS
Golden Lions
2nd title

== Vodacom Shield ==
=== Table ===
2002 Vodacom Shield Table
	Team	Played	Won	Drawn	Lost	Points For	Points Against	Points Difference	Tries For	Tries Against	Try Bonus	Losing Bonus	Points
1	Natal	5	4	0	1	151	110	+41	20	14	3	1	20
2	Griquas	5	3	0	2	156	154	+2	19	17	3	2	17
3	Mighty Elephants	5	3	0	2	128	122	+6	18	15	2	1	15
4	SWD Eagles	5	2	0	3	189	200	-11	24	28	5	1	14
5	Griffons	5	2	0	3	138	159	-21	14	21	1	1	10
6	Western Province	5	1	0	4	132	149	-17	16	16	3	2	9
The top 4 teams qualified for the Vodacom Shield semi-finals. The top team promoted to the 2003 Vodacom Cup. Points breakdown: All results from the pool phases were brought forward. *4 points for a win *2 points for a draw *1 bonus point for a loss by seven points or less *1 bonus point for scoring four or more tries in a match

=== Results ===
==== Round one ====
2002-04-10	Griffons	22–27	Griquas	North West Stadium, Welkom
		Scoreboard

2002-04-11	Natal	32–16	Western Province	Absa Stadium, East London
		Scoreboard

2002-04-11	SWD Eagles	32–34	Mighty Elephants	Outeniqua Park, George
		Scoreboard

==== Round two ====
2002-04-17	Griquas	25–19	Natal	Griqua Park, Kimberley
		Scoreboard

2002-04-18	SWD Eagles	43–53	Griffons	Outeniqua Park, George
		Scoreboard

2002-04-18	Mighty Elephants	23–14	Western Province	Boet Erasmus Stadium, Port Elizabeth
		Scoreboard

==== Round three ====
2002-04-24	Griquas	27–33	Mighty Elephants	Griqua Park, Kimberley
		Scoreboard

2002-04-24	Western Province	28–12	Griffons	Florida Park, Parow
		Scoreboard

2002-04-25	Natal	39–29	SWD Eagles	Absa Stadium, East London
		Scoreboard

==== Semi-finals ====
2002-05-01	Griquas	23–30	Mighty Elephants	Griqua Park, Kimberley
		Scoreboard

2002-05-02	Natal	25–16	SWD Eagles	Woodburn Stadium, Pietermaritzburg
		Scoreboard

==== Final ====
2002-05-09	Natal	20–26	Mighty Elephants	Durban High School
		Scoreboard

=== Winners ===
2002
Vodacom Shield
CHAMPIONS
Mighty Elephants
