= 2003 Vodacom Cup =

- Champions: Golden Lions
- Matches played: 48

The 2003 Vodacom Cup was the 6th edition of this annual domestic cup competition. The Vodacom Cup is played between provincial rugby union teams in South Africa from the Currie Cup Premier and First Divisions.

== Competition ==
There were seven teams participating in the 2003 Vodacom Cup competition and another seven teams participating in the 2003 Vodacom Shield competition. Teams would play all the other teams in their competition once over the course of the season, either at home or away.

Teams received four points for a win and two points for a draw. Bonus points were awarded to teams that score four or more tries in a game, as well as to teams losing a match by seven points or less. Teams were ranked by points, then points difference (points scored less points conceded).

The top two teams in each competition qualified for the semi-finals. In the semi-finals, the teams that finished first in each competition had home advantage against the teams that finished fourth and the teams that finished second in each competition had home advantage against the teams that finished third. The winners of these semi-finals then played each other in the final.

The bottom team in the Vodacom Cup was relegated to the 2004 Vodacom Shield, while the top team in the Vodacom Shield was promoted to the 2004 Vodacom Cup.

== Teams ==
Location of teams in 2003 Vodacom Cup and 2003 Vodacom Shield
Vodacom Cup
Vodacom Shield

=== Changes from 2002 ===
- For the 2003 season, the Vodacom Cup competition was changed once more; both the main Vodacom Cup competition and the secondary Vodacom Shield competition consisted of 7 teams.

=== Team Listing ===
The following teams took part in the 2003 Vodacom Cup competitions:

Vodacom Cup
| Team | Stadium/s |
| Boland Cavaliers | Boland Stadium, Wellington |
| Boland Cavaliers | Ceres Rugby Club, Ceres |
| Falcons | Pam Brink Stadium, Springs |
| Falcons | Prince George Park, Boksburg |
| Golden Lions | RAU Stadium, Johannesburg |
| Golden Lions | Randfontein Rugby Club, Randfontein |
| Golden Lions | Dobsonville |
| Leopards | Olën Park, Potchefstroom |
| Leopards | Manzil Park, Klerksdorp |
| Blue Bulls | Securicor Loftus, Pretoria |
| Natal | Kings Park Stadium, Durban |
| Free State Cheetahs | Vodacom Park, Bloemfontein |
| Free State Cheetahs | Seisa Ramabodu Stadium, Botshabelo |

Vodacom Shield
| Team | Stadium/s |
| Griffons | North West Stadium, Welkom |
| Griffons | Bronville Stadium, Welkom |
| Griquas | Griqua Park, Kimberley |
| Griquas | AR Abass Stadium, Kimberley |
| Western Province | Newlands Stadium, Cape Town |
| Western Province | Faure Street Stadium, Paarl |
| Mighty Elephants | Boet Erasmus Stadium, Port Elizabeth |
| Mighty Elephants | Central Grounds, Uitenhage |
| Mighty Elephants | Wolfson Stadium, KwaZakele |
| Pumas | @lantic Park, Witbank |
| Pumas | Embalenhle Stadium, Secunda |
| Border Bulldogs | Absa Stadium, East London |
| Border Bulldogs | Sisa Dukashe Stadium, Mdantsane |
| SWD Eagles | Outeniqua Park, George |
| SWD Eagles | D'Almeida Stadium, Mossel Bay |

== Vodacom Cup ==
=== Table ===
2003 Vodacom Cup Table
| | Team | Played | Won | Drawn | Lost | Points For | Points Against | Points Difference | Tries For | Tries Against | Try Bonus | Losing Bonus | Points |
| 1 | Blue Bulls | 6 | 5 | 0 | 1 | 236 | 133 | +103 | 31 | 12 | 5 | 1 | 26 |
| 2 | Free State Cheetahs | 6 | 5 | 0 | 1 | 256 | 147 | +109 | 35 | 17 | 4 | 0 | 24 |
| 3 | Golden Lions | 6 | 4 | 0 | 2 | 246 | 151 | +95 | 24 | 19 | 3 | 1 | 20 |
| 4 | Leopards | 6 | 3 | 0 | 3 | 167 | 214 | -47 | 18 | 27 | 1 | 1 | 14 |
| 5 | Natal | 6 | 2 | 0 | 4 | 149 | 217 | -68 | 19 | 31 | 2 | 2 | 12 |
| 6 | Falcons | 6 | 2 | 0 | 4 | 159 | 240 | -81 | 20 | 28 | 2 | 1 | 11 |
| 7 | Boland Cavaliers | 6 | 0 | 0 | 6 | 123 | 234 | -111 | 19 | 32 | 3 | 1 | 4 |
The top 4 teams qualified for the Vodacom Cup Semi-Finals. The bottom team relegated to the 2004 Vodacom Shield. Points breakdown: *4 points for a win *2 points for a draw *1 bonus point for a loss by seven points or less *1 bonus point for scoring four or more tries in a match

=== Results ===
==== Round one ====
| 2003-03-19 | Blue Bulls | 37–16 | Boland Cavaliers | Securicor Loftus, Pretoria |
| | | Scoreboard |

| 2003-03-20 | Golden Lions | 65–19 | Natal | Dobsonville |
| | | Scoreboard |

| 2003-03-22 | Free State Cheetahs | 49–20 | Leopards | Vodacom Park, Bloemfontein |
| | | Scoreboard |

==== Round two ====
| 2003-03-26 | Natal | 15–16 | Free State Cheetahs | Kings Park Stadium, Durban |
| | | Scoreboard |

| 2003-03-27 | Boland Cavaliers | 21–31 | Golden Lions | Ceres Rugby Club, Ceres |
| | | Scoreboard |

| 2003-03-28 | Leopards | 35–24 | Falcons | Manzil Park, Klerksdorp |
| | | Scoreboard |

==== Round three ====
| 2003-04-02 | Free State Cheetahs | 79–28 | Boland Cavaliers | Seisa Ramabodu Stadium, Botshabelo |
| | | Scoreboard |

| 2003-04-02 | Golden Lions | 28–35 | Blue Bulls | RAU Stadium, Johannesburg |
| | | Scoreboard |

| 2003-04-03 | Falcons | 36–37 | Natal | Prince George Park, Boksburg |
| | | Scoreboard |

==== Round four ====
| 2003-04-09 | Boland Cavaliers | 24–43 | Falcons | Boland Stadium, Wellington |
| | | Scoreboard |

| 2003-04-10 | Blue Bulls | 39–18 | Free State Cheetahs | Securicor Loftus, Pretoria |
| | | Scoreboard |

| 2003-04-10 | Natal | 36–38 | Leopards | Kings Park Stadium, Durban |
| | | Scoreboard |

==== Round Five ====
| 2003-04-17 | Falcons | 27–23 | Blue Bulls | Pam Brink Stadium, Springs |
| | | Scoreboard |

| 2003-04-17 | Free State Cheetahs | 38–26 | Golden Lions | Vodacom Park, Bloemfontein |
| | | Scoreboard |

| 2003-04-17 | Leopards | 23–14 | Boland Cavaliers | Olën Park, Potchefstroom |
| | | Scoreboard |

==== Round Six ====
| 2003-04-23 | Boland Cavaliers | 20–21 | Natal | Boland Stadium, Wellington |
| | | Scoreboard |

| 2003-04-24 | Golden Lions | 65–10 | Falcons | Randfontein Rugby Club, Randfontein |
| | | Scoreboard |

| 2003-04-26 | Blue Bulls | 60–23 | Leopards | Securicor Loftus, Pretoria |
| | Try: Anton Leonard, Gavin Passens, Gavin September (2), Gideon (Gerhardus) Roux (2), Giscard Pieters, John Mametsa (2); Con: Gideon (Gerhardus) Roux (6); Pen: Gideon (Gerhardus) Roux | Scoreboard | Try: Henno Mentz, Kaya Malotana; Con: Tewis de Bruyn (2); Pen: Jan Willem (Jannie) Viljoen (3) |

==== Round Seven ====
| 2003-04-30 | Falcons | 19–56 | Free State Cheetahs | Pam Brink Stadium, Springs |
| | | Scoreboard |

| 2003-05-01 | Natal | 21–42 | Blue Bulls | Kings Park Stadium, Durban |
| | | Scoreboard |

| 2003-05-02 | Leopards | 28–31 | Golden Lions | Olën Park, Potchefstroom |
| | | Scoreboard |

==== Semi-finals ====
| 2003-05-07 | Free State Cheetahs | 16–20 | Golden Lions | Vodacom Park, Bloemfontein |
| | | Scoreboard |

| 2003-05-10 | Blue Bulls | 47–19 | Leopards | Securicor Loftus, Pretoria |
| | | Scoreboard |

==== Final ====
| 2003-05-15 | Blue Bulls | 17–26 | Golden Lions | Securicor Loftus, Pretoria |
| | Try: Danie Rossouw; Pen: Gideon Roux (4) | Scoreboard | Try: Grant Esterhuizen, Sean Plaatjies; Con: Louis van Rensburg (2); Pen: Louis van Rensburg (4) |

Blue Bulls:
| FB | 15 | Gavin Passens |
| RW | 14 | John Mametsa |
| OC | 13 | JP Nel |
| IC | 12 | Tiaan Joubert |
| LW | 11 | Gavin September |
| FH | 10 | Morné Steyn |
| SH | 9 | Gideon Gerhardus Roux |
| N8 | 8 | Anton Leonard |
| BF | 7 | Johan Wasserman |
| OF | 6 | Ruan Vermeulen |
| RL | 5 | Francois van Schouwenburg |
| LL | 4 | Danie Rossouw |
| TP | 3 | Tjaart Coetzee |
| HK | 2 | Kobus van der Walt |
| LP | 1 | Wessel Roux |
Substitutes:
| HK | 16 | Germaine Brinkhuis |
| PR | 17 | Sias Wagner |
| PR | 18 | Altenstadt Hulme |
| BR | 19 | Bian Vermaak |
| BR | 20 | Coenraad Groenewald |
| SH | 21 | Wynand Olivier |
| OB | 22 | Giscard Pieters |
Coach:

Sharks:
| FB | 15 | Oginga Siwundla |
| RW | 14 | John Daniels |
| OC | 13 | Grant Esterhuizen |
| IC | 12 | Danie van Schalkwyk |
| LW | 11 | Sasha Marot |
| FH | 10 | Louis Hendrik van Rensburg |
| SH | 9 | Bennie Nortje |
| N8 | 8 | Cobus Grobbelaar |
| BF | 7 | Ettienne Barnard |
| OF | 6 | Sean Plaatjies |
| RL | 5 | Cobus Grobler |
| LL | 4 | Trevor Hall |
| TP | 3 | Pierre du Toit |
| HK | 2 | James Joseph van der Walt |
| LP | 1 | Heinrich Kok |
Substitutes:
| HK | 16 | Willie Wepener |
| PR | 17 | Riaan Olckers |
| PR | 18 | Drikus Hancke |
| BR | 19 | Solly Tyibilika |
| LK | 20 | Grant Bartle |
| SH | 21 | Coenraad Johannes Fourie |
| CE | 22 | Bryan Habana |
Coach:

Assistant Referees:

Television match official:

=== Winners ===
2003
Vodacom Cup
CHAMPIONS
Golden Lions
3rd title

== Vodacom Shield ==
=== Table ===
2003 Vodacom Shield Table
| | Team | Played | Won | Drawn | Lost | Points For | Points Against | Points Difference | Tries For | Tries Against | Try Bonus | Losing Bonus | Points |
| 1 | Border Bulldogs | 6 | 6 | 0 | 0 | 225 | 117 | +108 | 25 | 14 | 4 | 0 | 28 |
| 2 | Griquas | 6 | 4 | 0 | 2 | 194 | 148 | +46 | 27 | 17 | 5 | 2 | 23 |
| 3 | Western Province | 6 | 4 | 0 | 2 | 185 | 181 | +4 | 21 | 25 | 3 | 1 | 20 |
| 4 | Mighty Elephants | 6 | 3 | 0 | 3 | 165 | 159 | +6 | 21 | 16 | 4 | 1 | 17 |
| 5 | Pumas | 6 | 2 | 0 | 4 | 170 | 190 | -20 | 22 | 23 | 4 | 2 | 14 |
| 6 | SWD Eagles | 6 | 2 | 0 | 4 | 147 | 185 | -38 | 20 | 24 | 1 | 0 | 9 |
| 7 | Griffons | 6 | 0 | 0 | 6 | 142 | 248 | -106 | 15 | 32 | 1 | 1 | 2 |
The top 4 teams qualified for the Vodacom Shield Semi-Finals. The top team promoted to the 2004 Vodacom Cup. Points breakdown: *4 points for a win *2 points for a draw *1 bonus point for a loss by seven points or less *1 bonus point for scoring four or more tries in a match

=== Results ===
==== Round one ====
| 2003-03-19 | Mighty Elephants | 31–39 | Western Province | Central Grounds, Uitenhage |
| | | Scoreboard |

| 2003-03-19 | Griffons | 29–36 | Pumas | North West Stadium, Welkom |
| | | Scoreboard |

| 2003-03-20 | SWD Eagles | 15–27 | Border Bulldogs | Outeniqua Park, George |
| | | Scoreboard |

==== Round two ====
| 2003-03-26 | Western Province | 31–16 | Griffons | Faure Street Stadium, Paarl |
| | | Scoreboard |

| 2003-03-26 | Pumas | 24–26 | Griquas | @lantic Park, Witbank |
| | | Scoreboard |

| 2003-03-27 | Border Bulldogs | 22–5 | Mighty Elephants | Sisa Dukashe Stadium, Mdantsane |
| | | Scoreboard |

==== Round three ====
| 2003-04-02 | Griquas | 29–24 | Western Province | Griqua Park, Kimberley |
| | | Scoreboard |

| 2003-04-02 | Griffons | 16–43 | Border Bulldogs | North West Stadium, Welkom |
| | | Scoreboard |

| 2003-04-02 | Mighty Elephants | 30–5 | SWD Eagles | Boet Erasmus Stadium, Port Elizabeth |
| | | Scoreboard |

==== Round four ====
| 2003-04-09 | Border Bulldogs | 28–19 | Griquas | Absa Stadium, East London |
| | | Scoreboard |

| 2003-04-10 | Western Province | 33–28 | Pumas | Newlands Stadium, Cape Town |
| | | Scoreboard |

| 2003-04-10 | SWD Eagles | 62–30 | Griffons | D'Almeida Stadium, Mossel Bay |
| | | Scoreboard |

==== Round Five ====
| 2003-04-15 | Pumas | 35–46 | Border Bulldogs | @lantic Park, Witbank |
| | | Scoreboard |

| 2003-04-15 | Griffons | 29–40 | Mighty Elephants | Bronville Stadium, Welkom |
| | | Scoreboard |

| 2003-04-17 | Griquas | 56–21 | SWD Eagles | Griqua Park, Kimberley |
| | | Scoreboard |

==== Round Six ====
| 2003-04-23 | Border Bulldogs | 59–26 | Western Province | Absa Stadium, East London |
| | | Scoreboard |

| 2003-04-23 | Mighty Elephants | 29–28 | Griquas | Wolfson Stadium, KwaZakele |
| | | Scoreboard |

| 2003-04-24 | SWD Eagles | 26–10 | Pumas | Outeniqua Park, George |
| | | Scoreboard |

==== Round Seven ====
| 2003-04-29 | Pumas | 36–30 | Mighty Elephants | Embalenhle Stadium, Secunda |
| | | Scoreboard |

| 2003-04-30 | Western Province | 32–18 | SWD Eagles | Newlands Stadium, Cape Town |
| | | Scoreboard |

| 2003-05-01 | Griquas | 36–22 | Griffons | AR Abass Stadium, Kimberley |
| | | Scoreboard |

==== Semi-finals ====
| 2003-05-07 | Border Bulldogs | 28–21 | Mighty Elephants | Absa Stadium, East London |
| | | Scoreboard |

| 2003-05-08 | Griquas | 31–10 | Western Province | Griqua Park, Kimberley |
| | | Scoreboard |

==== Final ====
| 2003-05-15 | Border Bulldogs | 32–0 | Griquas | Absa Stadium, East London |
| | | Scoreboard |

=== Winners ===
2003
Vodacom Shield
CHAMPIONS
Border Bulldogs
