= 2005 Vodacom Cup =

South African provincial rugby union competition

- Champions: Griquas
- Matches played: 52

The 2005 Vodacom Cup was the 8th edition of this annual domestic cup competition. The Vodacom Cup is played between provincial rugby union teams in South Africa from the Currie Cup Premier and First Divisions.

== Competition ==
There were 14 teams participating in the 2005 Vodacom Cup competition. These teams were divided into two sections of equal strength; Section X and Section Y, both with seven teams. Teams would play all the teams in the other section once over the course of the season, either at home or away.

Teams received four points for a win and two points for a draw. Bonus points were awarded to teams that score four or more tries in a game, as well as to teams losing a match by seven points or less. Teams were ranked by points, then points difference (points scored less points conceded).

The top two teams in each section qualified for the semi-finals. In the semi-finals, the teams that finished first in each section had home advantage against the teams that finished fourth and the teams that finished second in each section had home advantage against the teams that finished third. The winners of these semi-finals then played each other in the final.

== Teams ==
Location of teams in 2005 Vodacom Cup
Section X
Section Y

=== Changes from 2004 ===
- The Vodacom Shield competition was scrapped and teams were divided into two equally strength groups; Section X and Section Y.

=== Team Listing ===
The following teams took part in the 2005 Vodacom Cup competition:

Section X
Team	Stadium/s
Boland Cavaliers	Boland Stadium, Wellington
Falcons	Bosman Stadium, Brakpan
Golden Lions	Ellis Park Stadium, Johannesburg
Golden Lions	Wits Rugby Stadium, Johannesburg
Golden Lions	Alberton
Mighty Elephants	EPRU Stadium, Port Elizabeth
Mighty Elephants	Central Grounds, Uitenhage
Mighty Elephants	Despatch
Mighty Elephants	Humansdorp
Natal	Kings Park Stadium, Durban
SWD Eagles	Outeniqua Park, George
SWD Eagles	Oudtshoorn
Blue Bulls	Securicor Loftus, Pretoria
Blue Bulls	Westelikes Sports Grounds, Pretoria West

Section Y
Team	Stadium/s
Border Bulldogs	Absa Stadium, East London
Griffons	North West Stadium, Welkom
Leopards	Olën Park, Potchefstroom
Leopards	Potchefstroom University, Potchefstroom
Leopards	Zeerust
Western Province	Newlands Stadium, Cape Town
Western Province	Florida Park, Parow
Pumas	@lantic Park, Witbank
Free State Cheetahs	Vodacom Park, Bloemfontein
Griquas	Griqua Park, Kimberley

== Tables ==
=== Section X ===
2005 Vodacom Cup Section X Table
	Team	Played	Won	Drawn	Lost	Points For	Points Against	Points Difference	Tries For	Tries Against	Try Bonus	Losing Bonus	Points
1	Blue Bulls	7	5	0	2	255	184	+71	34	20	6	2	28
2	Boland Cavaliers	7	5	0	2	258	165	+93	34	19	6	0	26
3	SWD Eagles	7	4	0	3	206	253	−47	22	31	3	0	19
4	Falcons	7	3	1	3	208	188	+20	25	24	3	1	18
5	Golden Lions	7	2	0	5	180	224	−44	18	30	3	2	23
6	Natal	7	2	0	5	174	213	−39	23	28	3	1	12
7	Mighty Elephants	7	2	0	5	174	236	−62	18	29	2	0	10
The top 2 teams qualified for the semi-finals. Points breakdown: *4 points for a win *2 points for a draw *1 bonus point for a loss by seven points or less *1 bonus point for scoring four or more tries in a match

=== Section Y ===
2005 Vodacom Cup Section Y Table
	Team	Played	Won	Drawn	Lost	Points For	Points Against	Points Difference	Tries For	Tries Against	Try Bonus	Losing Bonus	Points
1	Griquas	7	5	1	1	236	132	+104	30	14	3	0	25
2	Leopards	7	5	0	2	234	177	+57	28	20	4	1	25
3	Western Province	7	4	0	3	214	179	+35	27	21	6	1	23
4	Free State Cheetahs	7	4	0	3	248	197	+51	33	24	4	1	21
5	Pumas	7	4	0	3	230	256	−26	27	29	4	0	20
6	Border Bulldogs	7	2	0	5	130	241	−111	13	31	1	1	10
7	Griffons	7	1	0	6	171	273	−102	23	35	3	1	8
The top 2 teams qualified for the semi-finals. Points breakdown: *4 points for a win *2 points for a draw *1 bonus point for a loss by seven points or less *1 bonus point for scoring four or more tries in a match

== Results ==
=== Round one ===
2005-03-11	Boland Cavaliers	34–20	Pumas	Boland Stadium, Wellington
		Scoreboard

2005-03-11	Natal	19–13	Leopards	Absa Stadium, Durban
		Scoreboard

2005-03-11	Blue Bulls	35–11	Western Province	Securicor Loftus, Pretoria
		Scoreboard

2005-03-11	Mighty Elephants	18–32	Free State Cheetahs	EPRU Stadium, Port Elizabeth
		Scoreboard

2005-03-12	Golden Lions	29–14	Griffons	Ellis Park Stadium, Johannesburg
		Scoreboard

2005-03-12	SWD Eagles	35–20	Border Bulldogs	Outeniqua Park, George
		Scoreboard

2005-03-12	Falcons	23–23	Griquas	Bosman Stadium, Brakpan
		Scoreboard

=== Round two ===
2005-03-18	Falcons	27–16	Free State Cheetahs	Bosman Stadium, Brakpan
		Scoreboard

2005-03-19	Golden Lions	41–48	Leopards	Ellis Park Stadium, Johannesburg
		Scoreboard

2005-03-19	Blue Bulls	39–29	Griffons	Westelikes Sports Grounds, Pretoria West
		Scoreboard

2005-03-19	SWD Eagles	21–55	Pumas	Outeniqua Park, George
		Scoreboard

2005-03-19	Mighty Elephants	15–34	Western Province	Central Grounds, Uitenhage
		Scoreboard

2005-03-19	Boland Cavaliers	29–15	Griquas	Boland Stadium, Wellington
		Scoreboard

2005-03-19	Natal	43–0	Border Bulldogs	Absa Stadium, Durban
		Scoreboard

=== Round three ===
2005-04-01	Free State Cheetahs	20–10	Boland Cavaliers	Vodacom Park, Bloemfontein
		Scoreboard

2005-04-01	Pumas	39–38	Natal	@lantic Park, Witbank
		Scoreboard

2005-04-02	Leopards	24–34	Blue Bulls	Zeerust
		Scoreboard

2005-04-02	Griquas	60–21	SWD Eagles	Griqua Park, Kimberley
		Scoreboard

2005-04-02	Western Province	49–20	Falcons	Florida Park, Parow
		Scoreboard

2005-04-02	Griffons	37–42	Mighty Elephants	North West Stadium, Welkom
		Scoreboard

2005-04-02	Border Bulldogs	12–15	Golden Lions	Absa Stadium, East London
		Scoreboard

=== Round four ===
2005-04-08	Boland Cavaliers	40–32	Western Province	Boland Stadium, Wellington
		Scoreboard

2005-04-08	Golden Lions	30–34	Pumas	Alberton
		Scoreboard

2005-04-09	Blue Bulls	26–33	Border Bulldogs	Securicor Loftus, Pretoria
		Scoreboard

2005-04-09	SWD Eagles	38–28	Free State Cheetahs	Outeniqua Park, George
		Scoreboard

2005-04-09	Mighty Elephants	21–34	Leopards	Humansdorp
		Scoreboard

2005-04-09	Falcons	40–12	Griffons	Bosman Stadium, Brakpan
		Scoreboard

2005-04-09	Natal	10–21	Griquas	Absa Stadium, Durban
		Scoreboard

=== Round Five ===
2005-04-15	Griquas	44–11	Golden Lions	Griqua Park, Kimberley
		Scoreboard

2005-04-15	Border Bulldogs	36–25	Mighty Elephants	Absa Stadium, East London
		Scoreboard

2005-04-16	Western Province	32–36	SWD Eagles	Newlands Stadium, Cape Town
		Scoreboard

2005-04-16	Free State Cheetahs	65–20	Natal	Vodacom Park, Bloemfontein
		Scoreboard

2005-04-16	Griffons	24–58	Boland Cavaliers	North West Stadium, Welkom
		Scoreboard

2005-04-16	Leopards	30–17	Falcons	Olën Park, Potchefstroom
		Scoreboard

2005-04-16	Pumas	16–49	Blue Bulls	@lantic Park, Witbank
		Scoreboard

=== Round Six ===
2005-04-22	Boland Cavaliers	28–37	Leopards	Boland Stadium, Wellington
		Scoreboard

2005-04-22	Natal	17–30	Western Province	Absa Stadium, Durban
		Scoreboard

2005-04-23	Blue Bulls	26–30	Griquas	Securicor Loftus, Pretoria
		Scoreboard

2005-04-23	Golden Lions	38–46	Free State Cheetahs	Wits Rugby Stadium, Johannesburg
		Scoreboard

2005-04-23	Falcons	38–12	Border Bulldogs	Bosman Stadium, Brakpan
		Scoreboard

2005-04-23	Mighty Elephants	41–20	Pumas	Despatch
		Scoreboard

2005-04-23	SWD Eagles	38–10	Griffons	Oudtshoorn
		Scoreboard

=== Round Seven ===
2005-04-29	Border Bulldogs	17–59	Boland Cavaliers	Absa Stadium, East London
		Scoreboard

2005-04-30	Western Province	26–16	Golden Lions	Newlands Stadium, Cape Town
		Scoreboard

2005-04-30	Free State Cheetahs	41–46	Blue Bulls	Vodacom Park, Bloemfontein
		Scoreboard

2005-04-30	Griquas	43–12	Mighty Elephants	Griqua Park, Kimberley
		Scoreboard

2005-04-30	Griffons	45–27	Natal	North West Stadium, Welkom
		Scoreboard

2005-04-30	Pumas	46–43	Falcons	@lantic Park, Witbank
		Scoreboard

2005-04-30	Leopards	48–17	SWD Eagles	Potchefstroom University, Potchefstroom
		Scoreboard

=== Semi-finals ===
2005-05-06	Blue Bulls	11–17	Leopards	Securicor Loftus, Pretoria
		Scoreboard

2005-05-07	Griquas	16–13	Boland Cavaliers	Griqua Park, Kimberley
		Scoreboard

=== Final ===
2005-05-13	Griquas	27–25	Leopards	Griqua Park, Kimberley
		Scoreboard

== Winners ==
2005
Vodacom Cup
CHAMPIONS
Griquas
2nd title
