= 2004 Vodacom Cup =

- Champions: Golden Lions
- Matches played: 48

The 2004 Vodacom Cup was the 7th edition of this annual domestic cup competition. The Vodacom Cup is played between provincial rugby union teams in South Africa from the Currie Cup Premier and First Divisions.

== Competition ==
There were seven teams participating in the 2004 Vodacom Cup competition and another seven teams participating in the 2004 Vodacom Shield competition. Teams would play all the other teams in their competition once over the course of the season, either at home or away.

Teams received four points for a win and two points for a draw. Bonus points were awarded to teams that score four or more tries in a game, as well as to teams losing a match by seven points or less. Teams were ranked by points, then points difference (points scored less points conceded).

The top two teams in each competition qualified for the semi-finals. In the semi-finals, the teams that finished first in each competition had home advantage against the teams that finished fourth and the teams that finished second in each competition had home advantage against the teams that finished third. The winners of these semi-finals then played each other in the final.

All the teams in the Vodacom Shield competition rejoined the Vodacom Cup competition for 2005.

== Teams ==
Location of teams in 2004 Vodacom Cup and 2004 Vodacom Shield
Vodacom Cup
Vodacom Shield

=== Changes from 2003 ===
- Boland Cavaliers got relegated from the Vodacom Cup to the Vodacom Shield.
- Border Bulldogs got promoted from the Vodacom Shield to the Vodacom Cup.

=== Team Listing ===
The following teams took part in the 2004 Vodacom Cup competitions:

Vodacom Cup
Team	Stadium/s
Border Bulldogs	Absa Stadium, East London
Border Bulldogs	Queen's College, Queenstown
Falcons	Bosman Stadium, Brakpan
Falcons	Pam Brink Stadium, Springs
Golden Lions	Ellis Park Stadium, Johannesburg
Golden Lions	RAU Stadium, Johannesburg
Golden Lions	Eldorado Park Stadium, Johannesburg
Leopards	Olën Park, Potchefstroom
Leopards	Schweizer-Reneke
Blue Bulls	Securicor Loftus, Pretoria
Blue Bulls	HM Pitje Stadium, Mamelodi
Natal	Kings Park Stadium, Durban
Free State Cheetahs	Vodacom Park, Bloemfontein
Free State Cheetahs	Seisa Ramabodu Stadium, Botshabelo

Vodacom Shield
Team	Stadium/s
Boland Cavaliers	Boland Stadium, Wellington
Boland Cavaliers	Caledon Sports Grounds, Caledon
Griffons	North West Stadium, Welkom
Griffons	Bethlehem
Western Province	Newlands Stadium, Cape Town
Western Province	Danie Craven Stadium, Stellenbosch
Western Province	Bellville South
Mighty Elephants	EPRU Stadium, Port Elizabeth
Mighty Elephants	Central Grounds, Uitenhage
Pumas	@lantic Park, Witbank
SWD Eagles	Outeniqua Park, George
SWD Eagles	Rosemore Stadium, George
Griquas	Griqua Park, Kimberley

== Vodacom Cup ==
=== Table ===
2004 Vodacom Cup Table
	Team	Played	Won	Drawn	Lost	Points For	Points Against	Points Difference	Tries For	Tries Against	Try Bonus	Losing Bonus	Points
1	Golden Lions	6	6	0	0	267	145	+122	35	16	5	0	29
2	Free State Cheetahs	6	5	0	1	249	162	+87	30	18	3	0	23
3	Blue Bulls	6	4	0	2	231	186	+45	34	25	5	1	22
4	Falcons	6	3	0	3	206	232	-26	28	30	4	1	17
5	Natal	6	1	0	5	145	179	-34	17	23	2	2	8
6	Border Bulldogs	6	1	0	5	135	224	-89	15	32	1	2	7
7	Leopards	6	1	0	5	146	251	-105	16	31	1	1	6
The top 4 teams qualified for the Vodacom Cup Semi-Finals. Points breakdown: *4 points for a win *2 points for a draw *1 bonus point for a loss by seven points or less *1 bonus point for scoring four or more tries in a match

=== Results ===
==== Round one ====
2004-03-19	Blue Bulls	51–18	Natal	Securicor Loftus, Pretoria
	Try: Carel Hoffman, Gavin September (2), Gideon (Gerhardus) Roux, Keegan Fredericks, Lafras Uys, Scott Mathie, Werner Jungbluth; Con: Louis Strydom (2), Gideon (Gerhardus) Roux, Morne Steyn; Pen: Louis Strydom	Scoreboard	Try: Jovan Bowles, Nicolaas (Nico) Alberts; Con: Greg John Goosen; Pen: Greg John Goosen (2)

2004-03-20	Golden Lions	67–26	Leopards	RAU Stadium, Johannesburg
		Scoreboard

2004-03-20	Free State Cheetahs	91–24	Falcons	Vodacom Park, Bloemfontein
		Scoreboard

==== Round two ====
2004-03-26	Leopards	36–47	Blue Bulls	Olën Park, Potchefstroom
		Scoreboard

2004-03-27	Falcons	18–22	Golden Lions	Pam Brink Stadium, Springs
		Scoreboard

2004-03-27	Natal	42–0	Border Bulldogs	Kings Park Stadium, Durban
		Scoreboard

==== Round three ====
2004-04-03	Golden Lions	38–23	Free State Cheetahs	Eldorado Park Stadium, Johannesburg
		Scoreboard

2004-04-03	Blue Bulls	34–19	Falcons	HM Pitje Stadium, Mamelodi
		Scoreboard

2004-04-03	Border Bulldogs	32–19	Leopards	Queen's College, Queenstown
		Scoreboard

==== Round four ====
2004-04-10	Free State Cheetahs	50–23	Blue Bulls	Vodacom Park, Bloemfontein
		Scoreboard

2004-04-10	Falcons	50–48	Border Bulldogs	Bosman Stadium, Brakpan
		Scoreboard

2004-04-10	Leopards	17–14	Natal	Schweizer-Reneke
		Scoreboard

==== Round Five ====
2004-04-16	Natal	23–40	Falcons	Kings Park Stadium, Durban
		Scoreboard

2004-04-16	Border Bulldogs	13–16	Free State Cheetahs	Absa Stadium, East London
		Scoreboard

2004-04-17	Blue Bulls	40–41	Golden Lions	Securicor Loftus, Pretoria
		Scoreboard

==== Round Six ====
2004-04-23	Free State Cheetahs	33–32	Natal	Seisa Ramabodu Stadium, Botshabelo
		Scoreboard

2004-04-23	Falcons	55–14	Leopards	Bosman Stadium, Brakpan
		Scoreboard

2004-04-24	Golden Lions	61–22	Border Bulldogs	Ellis Park Stadium, Johannesburg
		Scoreboard

==== Round Seven ====
2004-04-30	Natal	16–34	Golden Lions	Kings Park Stadium, Durban
		Scoreboard

2004-04-30	Leopards	32–36	Free State Cheetahs	Olën Park, Potchefstroom
		Scoreboard

2004-05-01	Border Bulldogs	20–36	Blue Bulls	Absa Stadium, East London
		Scoreboard

==== Semi-finals ====
2004-05-07	Free State Cheetahs	20–23	Blue Bulls	Vodacom Park, Bloemfontein
		Scoreboard

2004-05-07	Golden Lions	47–17	Falcons	RAU Stadium, Johannesburg
		Scoreboard

==== Final ====
2004-05-15	Golden Lions	35–16	Blue Bulls	Ellis Park Stadium, Johannesburg
		Scoreboard

=== Winners ===
2004
Vodacom Cup
CHAMPIONS
Golden Lions
4th title

== Vodacom Shield ==
=== Table ===
2004 Vodacom Shield Table
	Team	Played	Won	Drawn	Lost	Points For	Points Against	Points Difference	Tries For	Tries Against	Try Bonus	Losing Bonus	Points
1	Boland Cavaliers	6	4	0	2	156	100	+56	21	12	3	1	20
2	SWD Eagles	6	4	0	2	164	151	+13	23	16	4	0	20
3	Pumas	6	3	0	3	183	133	+50	27	19	3	2	17
4	Western Province	6	3	0	3	169	185	-16	22	24	3	2	17
5	Griquas	6	3	0	3	152	130	+22	21	16	2	2	16
6	Mighty Elephants	6	2	0	4	165	203	-38	19	31	3	1	12
7	Griffons	6	2	0	4	153	240	-87	20	35	3	1	12
The top 4 teams qualified for the Vodacom Shield Semi-Finals. Points breakdown: *4 points for a win *2 points for a draw *1 bonus point for a loss by seven points or less *1 bonus point for scoring four or more tries in a match

=== Results ===
==== Round one ====
2004-03-19	Griffons	41–33	Griquas	North West Stadium, Welkom
		Scoreboard

2004-03-20	SWD Eagles	32–27	Western Province	Outeniqua Park, George
		Scoreboard

2004-03-20	Mighty Elephants	41–30	Pumas	Central Grounds, Uitenhage
		Scoreboard

==== Round two ====
2004-03-26	Griquas	45–19	Mighty Elephants	Griqua Park, Kimberley
		Scoreboard

2004-03-27	Western Province	35–25	Boland Cavaliers	Newlands Stadium, Cape Town
		Scoreboard

2004-03-27	Pumas	41–24	SWD Eagles	@lantic Park, Witbank
		Scoreboard

==== Round three ====
2004-04-02	Boland Cavaliers	15–14	Pumas	Boland Stadium, Wellington
		Scoreboard

2004-04-03	SWD Eagles	16–9	Griquas	Outeniqua Park, George
		Scoreboard

2004-04-03	Mighty Elephants	42–15	Griffons	EPRU Stadium, Port Elizabeth
		Scoreboard

==== Round four ====
2004-04-08	Griquas	13–24	Boland Cavaliers	Griqua Park, Kimberley
		Scoreboard

2004-04-10	Griffons	43–31	SWD Eagles	Bethlehem
		Scoreboard

2004-04-10	Pumas	24–20	Western Province	@lantic Park, Witbank
		Scoreboard

==== Round Five ====
2004-04-16	Western Province	10–30	Griquas	Bellville South
		Scoreboard

2004-04-17	SWD Eagles	42–15	Mighty Elephants	Rosemore Stadium, George
		Scoreboard

2004-04-17	Boland Cavaliers	47–11	Griffons	Caledon Sports Grounds, Caledon
		Scoreboard

==== Round Six ====
2004-04-23	Griquas	22–20	Pumas	Griqua Park, Kimberley
		Scoreboard

2004-04-24	Griffons	32–33	Western Province	North West Stadium, Welkom
		Scoreboard

2004-04-24	Mighty Elephants	6–29	Boland Cavaliers	EPRU Stadium, Port Elizabeth
		Scoreboard

==== Round Seven ====
2004-04-30	Boland Cavaliers	16–21	SWD Eagles	Boland Stadium, Wellington
		Scoreboard

2004-05-01	Pumas	54–11	Griffons	@lantic Park, Witbank
		Scoreboard

2004-05-01	Western Province	44–42	Mighty Elephants	Danie Craven Stadium, Stellenbosch
		Scoreboard

==== Semi-finals ====
2004-05-07	Boland Cavaliers	26–5	Western Province	Boland Stadium, Wellington
		Scoreboard

2004-05-08	SWD Eagles	31–21	Pumas	Outeniqua Park, George
		Scoreboard

==== Final ====
2004-05-14	Boland Cavaliers	19–12	SWD Eagles	Boland Stadium, Wellington
		Scoreboard

=== Winners ===
2004
Vodacom Shield
CHAMPIONS
Boland Cavaliers
