= 2001 Vodacom Cup =

- Champions: Blue Bulls
- Matches played: 80

The 2001 Vodacom Cup was the 4th edition of this annual domestic cup competition. The Vodacom Cup is played between provincial rugby union teams in South Africa from the Currie Cup Premier and First Divisions, as well as an invitational team, the Welwitschias from Namibia.

== Competition ==
There were 15 teams participating in the 2001 Vodacom Cup. These teams were divided into two sections of equal strength; Section X with eight teams and Section Y with seven teams. Teams would play all the other teams in their section once over the course of the season, either at home or away.

Teams received four points for a win and two points for a draw. Bonus points were awarded to teams that score four or more tries in a game, as well as to teams losing a match by seven points or less. Teams were ranked by points, then points difference (points scored less points conceded).

The top four teams in each section qualified for the Vodacom Top Eight competition, while the bottom four teams in Section X and the bottom three teams in Section Y qualified for the Vodacom Shield competition. For both the Vodacom Top Eight and Vodacom Shield competitions, all points already scored against teams that progressed to the same competition were carried forward. Teams then played once against the teams that qualified from the other section, with the top four teams in each competition advancing to the quarter-finals.

In the quarter-finals, the teams that finished first in each competition had home advantage against the teams that finished fourth and the teams that finished second in each competition had home advantage against the teams that finished third. The winners of these quarter finals then played each other in the semi-finals, with the higher placed team having home advantage. The two semi-final winners then met in the final for each competition.

== Teams ==
Location of teams in 2001 Vodacom Cup
Section X
Section Y

=== Changes from 2000 ===
- The Northern and Southern Sections were scrapped and replaced with two sections of equal strength; Sections X and Y.

=== Team Listing ===
The following teams took part in the 2001 Vodacom Cup competition:

Section X
Team	Stadium/s
Boland Cavaliers	Boland Stadium, Wellington
Falcons	Barnard Stadium, Kempton Park
Golden Lions	Ellis Park Stadium, Johannesburg
Griffons	North West Stadium, Welkom
Natal Wildebeest	Absa Stadium, Durban
Natal Wildebeest	Woodburn Stadium, Pietermaritzburg
Mighty Elephants	Boet Erasmus Stadium, Port Elizabeth
Free State Cheetahs	Vodacom Park, Bloemfontein
Welwitschias	Independence Stadium, Windhoek

Section Y
Team	Stadium/s
Blue Bulls	Loftus Versfeld, Pretoria
Western Province	Newlands Stadium, Cape Town
Leopards	Olën Park, Potchefstroom
Griquas	Griqua Park, Kimberley
Pumas	@lantic Park, Witbank
Border Bulldogs	Waverley Park, East London
SWD Eagles	Outeniqua Park, George
SWD Eagles	D'Almeida Stadium, Mossel Bay

== Pool Phases ==
=== Tables ===
==== Section X ====
2001 Vodacom Cup Section X Table
	Team	Played	Won	Drawn	Lost	Points For	Points Against	Points Difference	Tries For	Tries Against	Try Bonus	Losing Bonus	Points
1	Natal Wildebeest	7	6	0	1	216	160	+56	26	19	3	0	27
2	Boland Cavaliers	7	5	0	2	313	165	+148	46	21	6	0	26
3	Golden Lions	7	5	0	2	270	185	+85	34	17	4	0	26
4	Free State Cheetahs	7	4	0	3	242	172	+70	30	20	4	1	21
5	Mighty Elephants	7	4	0	3	255	190	+65	32	23	2	1	19
6	Griffons	7	3	0	4	169	152	+17	17	17	3	2	17
7	Falcons	7	1	0	6	219	232	-13	27	28	2	3	9
8	Welwitschias	7	0	0	7	95	523	-428	13	80	0	0	0
The top 4 teams qualified for the Vodacom Top Eight. The bottom 4 teams qualified for the Vodacom Shield. Points breakdown: *4 points for a win *2 points for a draw *1 bonus point for a loss by seven points or less *1 bonus point for scoring four or more tries in a match

==== Section Y ====
2001 Vodacom Cup Section Y Table
	Team	Played	Won	Drawn	Lost	Points For	Points Against	Points Difference	Tries For	Tries Against	Try Bonus	Losing Bonus	Points
1	Blue Bulls	6	5	0	1	242	140	+102	38	13	6	1	27
2	Griquas	6	3	1	2	205	185	+20	20	20	3	2	19
3	SWD Eagles	6	4	0	2	170	161	+9	18	16	2	0	18
4	Western Province	6	3	0	3	195	194	+1	25	25	4	0	16
5	Leopards	6	2	0	4	150	167	-17	14	17	1	2	11
6	Border Bulldogs	6	2	1	3	120	185	-65	10	21	0	1	11
7	Pumas	6	1	0	5	153	203	-50	16	29	2	2	8
The top 4 teams qualified for the Vodacom Top Eight. The bottom 3 teams qualified for the Vodacom Shield. Points breakdown: *4 points for a win *2 points for a draw *1 bonus point for a loss by seven points or less *1 bonus point for scoring four or more tries in a match

=== Results ===
==== Section X ====
===== Round one =====
2001-02-21	Free State Cheetahs	26–17	Boland Cavaliers	Vodacom Park, Bloemfontein
		Scoreboard

2001-02-21	Natal Wildebeest	26–3	Griffons	Absa Stadium, Durban
		Scoreboard

2001-02-22	Golden Lions	25–19	Mighty Elephants	Ellis Park Stadium, Johannesburg
		Scoreboard

2001-02-22	Falcons	76–7	Welwitschias	Barnard Stadium, Kempton Park
		Scoreboard

===== Round two =====
2001-02-28	Falcons	33–34	Golden Lions	Barnard Stadium, Kempton Park
		Scoreboard

2001-03-01	Mighty Elephants	47–15	Free State Cheetahs	Boet Erasmus Stadium, Port Elizabeth
		Scoreboard

2001-03-01	Welwitschias	10–36	Griffons	Independence Stadium, Windhoek
		Scoreboard

2001-03-02	Boland Cavaliers	38–13	Natal Wildebeest	Boland Stadium, Wellington
		Scoreboard

===== Round three =====
2001-03-07	Free State Cheetahs	37–9	Falcons	Vodacom Park, Bloemfontein
		Scoreboard

2001-03-08	Griffons	32–35	Boland Cavaliers	North West Stadium, Welkom
		Scoreboard

2001-03-08	Golden Lions	102–20	Welwitschias	Ellis Park Stadium, Johannesburg
		Scoreboard

2001-03-08	Natal Wildebeest	32–18	Mighty Elephants	Absa Stadium, Durban
		Scoreboard

===== Round four =====
2001-03-14	Free State Cheetahs	45–27	Golden Lions	Vodacom Park, Bloemfontein
		Scoreboard

2001-03-15	Mighty Elephants	26–21	Griffons	Boet Erasmus Stadium, Port Elizabeth
		Scoreboard

2001-03-15	Falcons	44–49	Natal Wildebeest	Barnard Stadium, Kempton Park
		Scoreboard

2001-03-15	Welwitschias	12–83	Boland Cavaliers	Independence Stadium, Windhoek
		Scoreboard

===== Round Five =====
2001-03-22	Natal Wildebeest	35–31	Free State Cheetahs	Absa Stadium, Durban
		Scoreboard

2001-03-22	Falcons	25–43	Boland Cavaliers	Barnard Stadium, Kempton Park
		Scoreboard

2001-03-22	Golden Lions	27–15	Griffons	Ellis Park Stadium, Johannesburg
		Scoreboard

2001-03-22	Mighty Elephants	110–17	Welwitschias	Boet Erasmus Stadium, Port Elizabeth
		Scoreboard

===== Round Six =====
2001-03-29	Golden Lions	13–22	Natal Wildebeest	Ellis Park Stadium, Johannesburg
		Scoreboard

2001-03-29	Boland Cavaliers	66–14	Mighty Elephants	Boland Stadium, Wellington
		Scoreboard

2001-03-29	Griffons	41–18	Falcons	North West Stadium, Welkom
		Scoreboard

2001-03-29	Welwitschias	16–78	Free State Cheetahs	Independence Stadium, Windhoek
		Scoreboard

===== Round Seven =====
2001-04-04	Boland Cavaliers	31–43	Golden Lions	Boland Stadium, Wellington
		Scoreboard

2001-04-04	Mighty Elephants	21–14	Falcons	Boet Erasmus Stadium, Port Elizabeth
		Scoreboard

2001-04-05	Griffons	21–10	Free State Cheetahs	North West Stadium, Welkom
		Scoreboard

2001-04-05	Welwitschias	13–39	Natal Wildebeest	Independence Stadium, Windhoek
		Scoreboard

==== Section Y ====
===== Round one =====
2001-02-22	Border Bulldogs	18–13	Pumas	Absa Stadium, Durban
		Scoreboard

2001-02-22	Leopards	23–36	Western Province	Olën Park, Potchefstroom
		Scoreboard

2001-02-22	Blue Bulls	37–27	SWD Eagles	Loftus Versfeld, Pretoria
		Scoreboard

===== Round two =====
2001-03-01	Pumas	22–32	Leopards	@lantic Park, Witbank
		Scoreboard

2001-03-01	Western Province	10–41	Blue Bulls	Newlands Stadium, Cape Town
		Scoreboard

2001-03-01	SWD Eagles	28–23	Griquas	Outeniqua Park, George
		Scoreboard

===== Round three =====
2001-03-07	Leopards	24–17	Border Bulldogs	Olën Park, Potchefstroom
		Scoreboard

2001-03-08	Blue Bulls	38–43	Pumas	Loftus Versfeld, Pretoria
		Scoreboard

2001-03-08	Griquas	48–39	Western Province	Griqua Park, Kimberley
		Scoreboard

===== Round four =====
2001-03-14	Border Bulldogs	12–52	Blue Bulls	Waverley Park, East London
		Scoreboard

2001-03-15	Pumas	26–47	Griquas	@lantic Park, Witbank
		Scoreboard

2001-03-16	Western Province	23–32	SWD Eagles	Newlands Stadium, Cape Town
		Scoreboard

===== Round Five =====
2001-03-22	Blue Bulls	33–13	Leopards	Loftus Versfeld, Pretoria
		Scoreboard

2001-03-22	Griquas	23–23	Border Bulldogs	Griqua Park, Kimberley
		Scoreboard

2001-03-22	SWD Eagles	30–17	Pumas	Outeniqua Park, George
		Scoreboard

===== Round Six =====
2001-03-29	Leopards	28–29	Griquas	Olën Park, Potchefstroom
		Scoreboard

2001-03-29	Border Bulldogs	32–23	SWD Eagles	Absa Stadium, Durban
		Scoreboard

2001-03-30	Pumas	32–37	Western Province	@lantic Park, Witbank
		Scoreboard

===== Round Seven =====
2001-04-04	Griquas	35–41	Blue Bulls	Griqua Park, Kimberley
		Scoreboard

2001-04-04	SWD Eagles	30–29	Leopards	D'Almeida Stadium, Mossel Bay
		Scoreboard

2001-04-05	Western Province	50–18	Border Bulldogs	Newlands Stadium, Cape Town
		Scoreboard

== Vodacom Top Eight ==
=== Table ===
2001 Vodacom Top Eight Table
	Team	Played	Won	Drawn	Lost	Points For	Points Against	Points Difference	Tries For	Tries Against	Try Bonus	Losing Bonus	Points
1	Blue Bulls	4	4	0	0	150	117	+33	41	16	3	0	34
2	Boland Cavaliers	4	3	0	1	194	109	+85	41	12	4	1	23
3	Griquas	4	3	0	1	131	100	+31	27	12	1	0	21
4	Free State Cheetahs	4	1	0	3	135	112	+23	27	14	2	3	20
5	Natal Wildebeest	4	0	1	3	91	111	-20	18	15	1	2	14
6	Western Province	4	2	1	1	123	129	-6	17	15	3	0	14
7	SWD Eagles	4	1	0	3	79	169	-90	16	24	0	1	14
8	Golden Lions	4	1	0	3	95	151	-56	22	20	2	1	12
The top 4 teams qualified for the Vodacom Top Eight semi-finals. Points breakdown: All results from the pool phases were brought forward. *4 points for a win *2 points for a draw *1 bonus point for a loss by seven points or less *1 bonus point for scoring four or more tries in a match

=== Results ===
==== Round one ====
2001-04-10	Boland Cavaliers	37–23	Griquas	Boland Stadium, Wellington
		Scoreboard

2001-04-12	Free State Cheetahs	58–18	SWD Eagles	Vodacom Park, Bloemfontein
		Scoreboard

2001-04-12	Natal Wildebeest	18–26	Blue Bulls	Woodburn Stadium, Pietermaritzburg
		Scoreboard

2001-04-12	Golden Lions	35–42	Western Province	Ellis Park Stadium, Johannesburg
		Scoreboard

==== Round two ====
2001-04-19	Blue Bulls	43–36	Free State Cheetahs	Loftus Versfeld, Pretoria
		Scoreboard

2001-04-19	Griquas	67–32	Golden Lions	Griqua Park, Kimberley
		Scoreboard

2001-04-19	SWD Eagles	28–23	Natal Wildebeest	Outeniqua Park, George
		Scoreboard

2001-04-19	Western Province	14–34	Boland Cavaliers	Newlands Stadium, Cape Town
		Scoreboard

==== Round three ====
2001-04-25	Boland Cavaliers	78–24	SWD Eagles	Boland Stadium, Wellington
		Scoreboard

2001-04-25	Natal Wildebeest	38–38	Western Province	Absa Stadium, Durban
		Scoreboard

2001-04-25	Free State Cheetahs	19–22	Griquas	Vodacom Park, Bloemfontein
		Scoreboard

2001-04-26	Golden Lions	18–33	Blue Bulls	Ellis Park Stadium, Johannesburg
		Scoreboard

==== Round four ====
2001-05-02	SWD Eagles	9–10	Golden Lions	Outeniqua Park, George
		Scoreboard

2001-05-03	Blue Bulls	48–45	Boland Cavaliers	Loftus Versfeld, Pretoria
		Scoreboard

2001-05-03	Griquas	19–12	Natal Wildebeest	Griqua Park, Kimberley
		Scoreboard

2001-05-03	Western Province	29–22	Free State Cheetahs	Newlands Stadium, Cape Town
		Scoreboard

==== Semi-finals ====
2001-05-10	Blue Bulls	39–38	Free State Cheetahs	Loftus Versfeld, Pretoria
		Scoreboard

2001-05-10	Boland Cavaliers	47–31	Griquas	Boland Stadium, Wellington
		Scoreboard

==== Final ====
2001-05-16	Blue Bulls	42–24	Boland Cavaliers	Loftus Versfeld, Pretoria
		Scoreboard

=== Winners ===
2001
Vodacom Top Eight
CHAMPIONS
Blue Bulls
1st title

== Vodacom Shield ==
The Welwitschias withdrew from the Vodacom Shield due to financial constraints.

=== Table ===
2001 Vodacom Shield Table
	Team	Played	Won	Drawn	Lost	Points For	Points Against	Points Difference	Tries For	Tries Against	Try Bonus	Losing Bonus	Points
1	Griffons	3	2	1	0	105	89	+15	15	12	0	0	16
2	Mighty Elephants	3	2	0	1	80	86	-6	12	10	0	0	16
3	Border Bulldogs	3	2	0	1	110	91	+20	15	10	1	1	15
4	Leopards	3	0	1	2	63	85	+22	16	8	1	1	13
5	Falcons	3	1	0	2	97	105	-8	14	11	2	1	8
6	Pumas	3	1	0	2	107	106	+1	15	9	1	1	7
The top 4 teams qualified for the Vodacom Shield semi-finals. Points breakdown: All results from the pool phases were brought forward. *4 points for a win *2 points for a draw *1 bonus point for a loss by seven points or less *1 bonus point for scoring four or more tries in a match

=== Results ===
==== Round one ====
2001-04-19	Griffons	33–26	Border Bulldogs	North West Stadium, Welkom
		Scoreboard

2001-04-19	Falcons	29–47	Pumas	Barnard Stadium, Kempton Park
		Scoreboard

2001-04-19	Mighty Elephants	25–18	Leopards	Boet Erasmus Stadium, Port Elizabeth
		Scoreboard

==== Round two ====
2001-04-24	Leopards	21–36	Falcons	Olën Park, Potchefstroom
		Scoreboard

2001-04-26	Border Bulldogs	47–26	Mighty Elephants	Waverley Park, East London
		Scoreboard

2001-04-26	Pumas	39–48	Griffons	@lantic Park, Witbank
		Scoreboard

==== Round three ====
2001-05-02	Border Bulldogs	37–32	Falcons	Absa Stadium, Durban
		Scoreboard

2001-05-03	Leopards	24–24	Griffons	Olën Park, Potchefstroom
		Scoreboard

2001-05-03	Mighty Elephants	29–21	Pumas	Boet Erasmus Stadium, Port Elizabeth
		Scoreboard

==== Semi-finals ====
2001-05-09	Mighty Elephants	47–13	Border Bulldogs	Boet Erasmus Stadium, Port Elizabeth
		Scoreboard

2001-05-10	Griffons	39–18	Leopards	North West Stadium, Welkom
		Scoreboard

==== Final ====
2001-05-17	Griffons	40–27	Mighty Elephants	North West Stadium, Welkom
		Scoreboard

=== Winners ===
2001
Vodacom Shield
CHAMPIONS
Griffons
