= Swys de Bruin =

South African rugby union coach

- Full name: Zacharia Francois de Bruin
- Born: 18 February 1960 (age 66) Ficksburg, South Africa

Rugby union career
Coaching career
- Years: Team
- 1996–1997: Sharks U21
- 1998: Natal Wildebeest
- 1999–2003: Griquas
- 2001: South Africa Under-21
- 2004–2012: Sharks (academy head coach / U19 and U21 skills coach)
- 2013–2017: Golden Lions / Lions (assistant and backline coach)
- 2017: Golden Lions (head coach)
- 2018–2019: Lions (head coach)
- 2018–2019: Lions (consultant)
- 2018–2019: South Africa (attack coach)
- 2024–2026: South Africa (Head coach)
- 2027–: Paarl Boys' High School (Head coach)

Zacharia Francois 'Swys' de Bruin (born 18 February 1960 in Ficksburg, South Africa) started his coaching career with Durban North College previously known as Afrikaans Hoër Durban-Noord and is a South African rugby union coach,and is the former head coach of the Springbok Women.

== Career ==
=== Sharks ===
De Bruin started his coaching career in Durban at the Sharks Academy. He was the head coach of the Sharks U21 side in 1996 and 1997 and took charge of the Natal Wildebeest in the 1998 Vodacom Cup, guiding the team to the semi-finals of the competition.

=== Griquas, South Africa Under-21 ===
After the 1998 Vodacom Cup, De Bruin moved to Kimberley to become the head coach of the Griquas. He coached the side between 1998 and 2003, helping them reach the final of the competition in 1999 and 2000.

In 2001, De Bruin was also in charge of the South Africa Under-21 team.

=== Return to Sharks ===
He returned to Durban in 2004 to join as the head and skills coach of the Sharks Academy, helping out at Vodacom Cup, Under-21 and Under-19 level.

=== Lions ===
After eight seasons back in Durban, De Bruin moved to Johannesburg to become Golden Lions and Lions head coach Johan Ackermann's assistant coach. The pair oversaw a complete turnaround in fortunes for the side; from relegation at the end of the 2012 Super Rugby season (they were replaced by the Southern Kings for 2013, the Lions not only won promotion back to the Super Rugby competition for 2014, but they achieved their highest points tally and number of wins since they competed in the tournament as the Cats. In 2015, they improved even further, securing a record nine victories during the tournament and finishing in the top half of the log for the first time since 2001. In the 2016 Super Rugby season the Lions, under Ackerman and De Bruyn's guidance, topped the South African Conference and reached the final of the competition, which they lost to New Zealand side, the Hurricanes. 2017 saw even more success as the Lions topped the Super Rugby table and hosted the final, falling this time to the Crusaders. After Ackermann accepted the head coaching job at English side Gloucester, de Bruin was named as his replacement from 2018 onwards.

Domestically, the Golden Lions also reached the final of the 2014 Currie Cup Premier Division, where they lost 16–19 to Western Province. In 2015, the Golden Lions went unbeaten through the Currie Cup to win it, beating Western Province in the final in Johannesburg. In 2016 and 2017 the Golden Lions were losing Semi-Finalists in the Currie Cup.

=== South Africa ===
His coaching had been in 2018 as Rassie Erasmus’ attack specialist, but stress and burnout from the Springboks on the eve of the World Cup. For five years De Bruin as a pundit for SuperSport. His head coach had been in Springboks Women in 2024.
