= 2000 Vodacom Cup =

- Champions: Free State Cheetahs
- Matches played: 56

The 2000 Vodacom Cup was the 3rd edition of this annual domestic cup competition. The Vodacom Cup is played between provincial rugby union teams in South Africa from the Currie Cup Premier and First Divisions, as well as an invitational team, the Welwitschias from Namibia.

== Competition ==
There were 15 teams participating in the 2000 Vodacom Cup. These teams were geographically divided into two sections; the Northern Section with eight teams and the Southern Section with seven teams. Teams would play all the other teams in their section once over the course of the season, either at home or away.

Teams received four points for a win and two points for a draw. Bonus points were awarded to teams that score four or more tries in a game, as well as to teams losing a match by seven points or less. Teams were ranked by points, then points difference (points scored less points conceded).

The top four teams in each section qualified for the play-offs. In the quarter-finals, the teams that finished first in each section had home advantage against the teams that finished fourth in the other section and the teams that finished second in each section had home advantage against the teams that finished third in the other section. The winners of these quarter finals then played each other in the semi-finals, with the higher placed team having home advantage. The two semi-final winners then met in the final.

== Teams ==
Location of teams in 2000 Vodacom Cup
Northern Section
Southern Section

=== Changes from 1999 ===
- No changes.

=== Team Listing ===
The following teams took part in the 2000 Vodacom Cup competition:

Northern Section
Team	Stadium/s
Falcons	Bosman Stadium, Brakpan
Golden Lions	Ellis Park Stadium, Johannesburg
Griffons	North West Stadium, Welkom
Leopards	Olën Park, Potchefstroom
Pumas	Johann van Riebeeck Stadium, Witbank
Blue Bulls	Loftus Versfeld, Pretoria
Griquas	Griqua Park, Kimberley
Welwitschias	Independence Stadium, Windhoek

Southern Section
Team	Stadium/s
Boland Cavaliers	Boland Stadium, Wellington
Mighty Elephants	Boet Erasmus Stadium, Port Elizabeth
Natal Wildebeest	Absa Stadium, Durban
Border Bulldogs	Waverley Park, East London
Free State Cheetahs	Vodacom Park, Bloemfontein
SWD Eagles	Outeniqua Park, George
Western Province	Newlands Stadium, Cape Town

== Tables ==
=== Northern Section ===
2000 Vodacom Cup Northern Section Table
	Team	Played	Won	Drawn	Lost	Points For	Points Against	Points Difference	Tries For	Tries Against	Try Bonus	Losing Bonus	Points
1	Griquas	7	6	0	1	243	141	+102	36	16	5	0	29
2	Falcons	7	5	0	2	269	140	+129	36	17	6	2	28
3	Blue Bulls	7	5	0	2	265	187	+78	34	25	2	1	23
4	Golden Lions	7	5	0	2	230	189	+41	31	23	3	0	23
5	Leopards	7	3	0	4	233	196	+37	28	23	2	2	16
6	Pumas	7	2	0	5	215	211	+4	30	26	5	3	16
7	Griffons	7	2	0	5	144	234	-90	17	29	1	0	9
8	Welwitschias	7	0	0	7	115	416	-301	11	64	1	0	1
The top 4 teams qualified for the quarter-finals. Points breakdown: *4 points for a win *2 points for a draw *1 bonus point for a loss by seven points or less *1 bonus point for scoring four or more tries in a match

=== Southern Section ===
2000 Vodacom Cup Southern Section Table
	Team	Played	Won	Drawn	Lost	Points For	Points Against	Points Difference	Tries For	Tries Against	Try Bonus	Losing Bonus	Points
1	Free State Cheetahs	6	5	0	1	269	146	+123	36	20	5	0	25
2	Western Province	6	4	0	2	199	136	+63	31	16	3	2	21
3	Mighty Elephants	6	3	0	3	161	161	0	20	22	3	2	17
4	Boland Cavaliers	6	3	1	2	167	217	-50	25	28	3	0	17
5	Border Bulldogs	6	3	0	3	156	164	-8	17	24	2	1	15
6	Natal Wildebeest	6	2	1	3	136	159	-23	17	19	3	1	14
7	SWD Eagles	6	0	0	6	121	226	-105	14	31	0	1	1
The top 4 teams qualified for the quarter-finals. Points breakdown: *4 points for a win *2 points for a draw *1 bonus point for a loss by seven points or less *1 bonus point for scoring four or more tries in a match

== Results ==
=== Northern Section ===
==== Round one ====
2000-02-23	Golden Lions	23–39	Falcons	Ellis Park Stadium, Johannesburg
		Scoreboard

2000-02-23	Griquas	40–25	Blue Bulls	Griqua Park, Kimberley
	Try: Leon van den Heever, Andre Vermeulen, Jearus Nicholas, Hanu Nel, Luther Bakkes; Con: Edrich Lubbe (3); Pen: Edrich Lubbe (3)	Scoreboard	Try: Jan Cloete, Trevor Arendse, Conrad Breytenbach; Con: Tiaan Snyman (2); Pen: Tiaan Snyman (2)

2000-02-24	Pumas	46–30	Leopards	Johann van Riebeeck Stadium, Witbank
		Scoreboard

2000-02-24	Griffons	57–13	Welwitschias	North West Stadium, Welkom
		Scoreboard

==== Round two ====
2000-03-01	Leopards	39–15	Griffons	Olën Park, Potchefstroom
		Scoreboard

2000-03-02	Welwitschias	15–62	Golden Lions	Independence Stadium, Windhoek
		Scoreboard

2000-03-02	Blue Bulls	34–33	Pumas	Loftus Versfeld, Pretoria
	Try: Conrad Breytenbach, Joseph Ntshongwane, Derick Grobbelaar; Con: Casper Steyn (2); Pen: Casper Steyn (3), Tiaan Snyman (2)	Scoreboard	Try: Giscard Pieters, Frikkie Welsh, Gavin Passens, Geoff Appleford (2); Con: Geoff Appleford (4)

2000-03-02	Falcons	16–17	Griquas	Bosman Stadium, Brakpan
		Scoreboard

==== Round three ====
2000-03-08	Pumas	27–39	Falcons	Johann van Riebeeck Stadium, Witbank
		Scoreboard

2000-03-09	Leopards	70–7	Welwitschias	Olën Park, Potchefstroom
		Scoreboard

2000-03-09	Griquas	38–17	Golden Lions	Griqua Park, Kimberley
		Scoreboard

2000-03-09	Griffons	21–39	Blue Bulls	North West Stadium, Welkom
	Try: Eddie Fredericks (2); Kevin Rabie; Con: Ehan Helmand (3)	Scoreboard	Try: Johan Roets (2); Chris Kruger; Jacques Olivier; Joseph Ntshongwane; Christo Bezuidenhout; Con: Tiaan Snyman (3); Pen: Tiaan Snyman (2)

==== Round four ====
2000-03-16	Welwitschias	21–31	Griquas	Independence Stadium, Windhoek
		Scoreboard

2000-03-16	Blue Bulls	26–21	Leopards	Loftus Versfeld, Pretoria
	Try: Tiaan Snyman; Jean Pieters; Draadkar de Lange; Con: Tiaan Snyman; Pen: Tiaan Snyman (3)	Scoreboard	Try: Bloues Volschenk; Diaan Kruger; Con: Roland de Marigny; Pen: Roland de Marigny (2); Drop: Roland de Marigny

2000-03-16	Falcons	29–5	Griffons	Bosman Stadium, Brakpan
		Scoreboard

2000-03-17	Golden Lions	35–30	Pumas	Ellis Park Stadium, Johannesburg
		Scoreboard

==== Round Five ====
2000-03-23	Blue Bulls	92–25	Welwitschias	Loftus Versfeld, Pretoria
	Try: Johan Roets; Chris Kruger (2); Jacques Olivier (2); Brendell Brandt; Tiaan Snyman (2); Jean Pieters (2); John Williams (2); Christo Bezuidenhout; Coenraad Groenewald; Con: Tiaan Snyman (9); Chelton April (2)	Scoreboard

2000-03-23	Pumas	30–43	Griquas	Johann van Riebeeck Stadium, Witbank
		Scoreboard

2000-03-23	Leopards	21–54	Falcons	Olën Park, Potchefstroom
		Scoreboard

2000-03-24	Griffons	28–44	Golden Lions	North West Stadium, Welkom
		Scoreboard

==== Round Six ====
2000-03-29	Griquas	57–5	Griffons	Griqua Park, Kimberley
		Scoreboard

2000-03-29	Falcons	27–30	Blue Bulls	Bosman Stadium, Brakpan
	Try: Piet Matthys; Freddie Roberts (2); Bertus Heunis; Con: Joe Esterhuysen; Cliffie McMahon; Pen: Joe Esterhuysen	Scoreboard	Try: Chris Kruger; Draadkar de Lange; Joseph Ntshongwane; Con: Tiaan Snyman (3); Pen: Tiaan Snyman (3)

2000-03-30	Golden Lions	31–25	Leopards	Ellis Park Stadium, Johannesburg
		Scoreboard

2000-03-30	Welwitschias	17–41	Pumas	Independence Stadium, Windhoek
		Scoreboard

==== Round Seven ====
2000-04-05	Griffons	13–8	Pumas	North West Stadium, Welkom
		Scoreboard

2000-04-05	Blue Bulls	14–20	Golden Lions	Loftus Versfeld, Pretoria
	Try: Johan Roets; Joseph Ntshongwane; Con: Tiaan Snyman (2)	Scoreboard	Try: James Dalton; Michael Laubscher; Con: Gareth Wright (2); Pen: Gareth Wright (2)

2000-04-06	Leopards	27–17	Griquas	Olën Park, Potchefstroom
		Scoreboard

2000-04-07	Falcons	65–17	Welwitschias	Bosman Stadium, Brakpan
		Scoreboard

=== Southern Section ===
==== Round one ====
2000-02-23	Mighty Elephants	13–17	Western Province	Boet Erasmus Stadium, Port Elizabeth
		Scoreboard

2000-02-24	Border Bulldogs	29–17	Boland Cavaliers	Waverley Park, East London
		Scoreboard

2000-02-24	Free State Cheetahs	69–17	SWD Eagles	Vodacom Park, Bloemfontein
		Scoreboard

==== Round two ====
2000-03-01	Western Province	47–20	Free State Cheetahs	Newlands Stadium, Cape Town
		Scoreboard

2000-03-02	SWD Eagles	18–26	Natal Wildebeest	Outeniqua Park, George
		Scoreboard

2000-03-02	Boland Cavaliers	41–39	Mighty Elephants	Boland Stadium, Wellington
		Scoreboard

==== Round three ====
2000-03-08	Natal Wildebeest	14–13	Western Province	Absa Stadium, Durban
		Scoreboard

2000-03-09	Free State Cheetahs	65–17	Boland Cavaliers	Vodacom Park, Bloemfontein
		Scoreboard

2000-03-09	Mighty Elephants	26–19	Border Bulldogs	Boet Erasmus Stadium, Port Elizabeth
		Scoreboard

==== Round four ====
2000-03-15	Boland Cavaliers	38–38	Natal Wildebeest	Boland Stadium, Wellington
		Scoreboard

2000-03-16	Border Bulldogs	6–32	Free State Cheetahs	Waverley Park, East London
		Scoreboard

2000-03-16	Western Province	40–26	SWD Eagles	Newlands Stadium, Cape Town
		Scoreboard

==== Round Five ====
2000-03-23	SWD Eagles	17–18	Boland Cavaliers	Outeniqua Park, George
		Scoreboard

2000-03-23	Free State Cheetahs	46–32	Mighty Elephants	Vodacom Park, Bloemfontein
		Scoreboard

2000-03-23	Natal Wildebeest	13–30	Border Bulldogs	Absa Stadium, Durban
		Scoreboard

==== Round Six ====
2000-03-29	Mighty Elephants	23–18	Natal Wildebeest	Boet Erasmus Stadium, Port Elizabeth
		Scoreboard

2000-03-30	Boland Cavaliers	36–29	Western Province	Boland Stadium, Wellington
		Scoreboard

2000-03-31	Border Bulldogs	45–23	SWD Eagles	Waverley Park, East London
		Scoreboard

==== Round Seven ====
2000-04-05	Western Province	53–27	Border Bulldogs	Newlands Stadium, Cape Town
		Scoreboard

2000-04-06	Natal Wildebeest	27–37	Free State Cheetahs	Absa Stadium, Durban
		Scoreboard

2000-04-06	SWD Eagles	20–28	Mighty Elephants	Outeniqua Park, George
		Scoreboard

=== Play-Offs ===
==== Quarter-finals ====
2000-04-12	Griquas	39–35	Boland Cavaliers	Griqua Park, Kimberley
		Scoreboard

2000-04-13	Free State Cheetahs	47–21	Golden Lions	Vodacom Park, Bloemfontein
		Scoreboard

2000-04-13	Western Province	36–21	Blue Bulls	Newlands Stadium, Cape Town
	Try: Donovan van Vuuren; Desmond Houston; Adri Badenhorst; Werner Greeff; Con: Chris Rossouw (2); Pen: Chris Rossouw (3); Drop: Chris Rossouw	Scoreboard	Try: Johan Roets; Chelton April; Con: Tiaan Snyman; Pen: Tiaan Snyman (3)

2000-04-13	Falcons	60–0	Mighty Elephants	Bosman Stadium, Brakpan
		Scoreboard

==== Semi-finals ====
2000-04-18	Free State Cheetahs	42–22	Falcons	Vodacom Park, Bloemfontein
		Scoreboard

2000-04-20	Griquas	41–27	Western Province	Griqua Park, Kimberley
		Scoreboard

==== Final ====
2000-04-27	Free State Cheetahs	44–24	Griquas	Vodacom Park, Bloemfontein
		Scoreboard

== Winners ==
2000
Vodacom Cup
CHAMPIONS

Free State Cheetahs
1st title
