= 1999 Vodacom Cup =

- Champions: Golden Lions
- Matches played: 101

The 1999 Vodacom Cup was the 2nd edition of this annual domestic cup competition. The Vodacom Cup is played between provincial rugby union teams in South Africa from the Currie Cup Premier and First Divisions, as well as an invitational team, the Namibia Kudus from Namibia.

== Competition ==
There were 15 teams participating in the 1999 Vodacom Cup. These teams were geographically divided into two sections - the Northern Section with eight teams and the Southern Section with seven teams. Teams would play all the other teams in their section twice over the course of the season, once at home and once away.

Teams received four points for a win and two points for a draw. Bonus points were awarded to teams that score four or more tries in a game, as well as to teams losing a match by seven points or less. Teams were ranked by points, then points difference (points scored less points conceded).

The top two teams in each section qualified for the play-offs. In the semi-finals, the teams that finished first in each section had home advantage against the teams that finished second in the other section. The winners of these semi-finals then played each other in the final.

== Teams ==
Location of teams in 1999 Vodacom Cup
Northern Section
Southern Section

=== Changes from 1998 ===
- The Namibia Kudus joined the competition.
- Section A was renamed Southern Section and Section B was renamed Northern Section.
- The Natal Wildebeest moved from Section B to the Southern Section.
- Griqualand West moved from Section A to the Northern Section.

=== Team Listing ===
The following teams took part in the 1999 Vodacom Cup competition:

Northern Section
Team	Stadium/s
Blue Bulls	Loftus Versfeld, Pretoria
Golden Lions	Ellis Park Stadium, Johannesburg
Griqualand West	Griqua Park, Kimberley
Falcons	Bosman Stadium, Brakpan
Namibia Kudus	Independence Stadium, Windhoek
North West	Olën Park, Potchefstroom
North West	Oppenheimer Stadium, Orkney
North West	Fochville
Northern Free State	North West Stadium, Welkom
Pumas	Johann van Riebeeck Stadium, Witbank

Southern Section
Team	Stadium/s
Boland	Boland Stadium, Wellington
Boland	Esselen Park, Worcester
Border	Waverley Park, East London
Eastern Province	Boet Erasmus Stadium, Port Elizabeth
Natal Wildebeest	Absa Stadium, Durban
SWD Eagles	Outeniqua Park, George
Free State Cheetahs	Vodacom Park, Bloemfontein
Western Province	Newlands Stadium, Cape Town
Western Province	Faure Street Stadium, Paarl
Western Province	Danie Craven Stadium, Stellenbosch

== Tables ==
=== Northern Section ===
1999 Vodacom Cup Northern Section Table
	Team	Played	Won	Drawn	Lost	Points For	Points Against	Points Difference	Tries For	Tries Against	Try Bonus	Losing Bonus	Points
1	Golden Lions	14	13	0	1	589	269	+320					62
2	Griqualand West	14	9	0	5	493	362	+131					49
3	Pumas	14	9	0	5	480	339	+141					46
4	Falcons	14	9	0	5	412	362	+50					44
5	Blue Bulls	14	7	0	7	416	468	-52					36
6	Northern Free State	14	4	1	9	327	500	-173					24
7	North West	14	3	0	11	298	425	-127					19
8	Namibia Kudus	14	1	1	12	273	563	-290					14
Note: Additional details unknown. The top 2 teams qualified for the semi-finals. Points breakdown: Unknown

=== Southern Section ===
1999 Vodacom Cup Southern Section Table
	Team	Played	Won	Drawn	Lost	Points For	Points Against	Points Difference	Tries For	Tries Against	Try Bonus	Losing Bonus	Points
1	Boland	12	8	0	4	321	269	+52					41
2	Natal Wildebeest	12	8	0	4	301	253	+48					41
3	SWD Eagles	12	6	0	6	289	249	+40					30
4	Eastern Province	12	6	0	6	261	267	-6					30
5	Western Province	12	5	0	7	308	339	-31					28
6	Border	12	5	0	7	262	298	-36					28
7	Free State Cheetahs	12	4	0	8	286	353	-67					23
Note: Additional details unknown. The top 2 teams qualified for the semi-finals. Points breakdown: Unknown

== Results ==
=== Northern Section ===
==== Round one ====
1999-02-17	Northern Free State	13 - 13	Namibia Kudus	North West Stadium, Welkom
		Scoreboard

1999-02-17	Griqualand West	36 - 11	Blue Bulls	Griqua Park, Kimberley
	Try: Skolla Scholtz, Edrich Lubbe, Rodger Smith (2), Casper Oosthuizen; Con: Dirkie Strydom (4); Pen: Dirkie Strydom	Scoreboard	Try: Peet Arnold; Pen: Casper Steyn (2)

1999-02-17	Golden Lions	40 - 18	Falcons	Ellis Park Stadium, Johannesburg
		Scoreboard

1999-02-18	Pumas	30 - 6	North West	Johann van Riebeeck Stadium, Witbank
		Scoreboard

==== Round two ====
1999-02-24	Golden Lions	57 - 7	Griqualand West	Ellis Park Stadium, Johannesburg
		Scoreboard

1999-02-25	Blue Bulls	35 - 30	Pumas	Loftus Versfeld, Pretoria
	Try: Johan Roets (2), Juan Schoeman, Ashley Pieters; Con: Casper Steyn (3); Pen: Casper Steyn (3)	Scoreboard	Try: Andries Fourie, Riaan Potgieter, Jacob Muchepa, Torros Pretorius; Con: Ian Noble; Pen: Ian Noble

1999-02-25	Namibia Kudus	8 - 11	Falcons	Independence Stadium, Windhoek
		Scoreboard

1999-02-25	North West	23 - 16	Northern Free State	Olën Park, Potchefstroom
		Scoreboard

==== Round three ====
1999-03-03	Northern Free State	22 - 34	Blue Bulls	North West Stadium, Welkom
	Try: Johann de Kock; Con: Darryl Eigner; Pen: Darryl Eigner (5)	Scoreboard	Try: Louis van Straaten, Frans Allers, Johan Reynecke, Penalty try Con: Casper Steyn (4); Pen: Casper Steyn (2)

1999-03-03	Pumas	23 - 22	Golden Lions	Johann van Riebeeck Stadium, Witbank
		Scoreboard

1999-03-04	North West	30 - 11	Namibia Kudus	Olën Park, Potchefstroom
		Scoreboard

1999-03-04	Griqualand West	45 - 19	Falcons	Griqua Park, Kimberley
		Scoreboard

==== Round four ====
1999-03-10	Blue Bulls	36 - 20	North West	Loftus Versfeld, Pretoria
	Try: Johan Roets (2), Jaco Viljoen, Louis van Straaten; Con: Casper Steyn (2); Pen: Casper Steyn (4)	Scoreboard	Try: Werner Lessing (2), Ronnie Adendorff; Con: Jaco Coetzee; Pen: Jaco Coetzee

1999-03-11	Namibia Kudus	13 - 34	Griqualand West	Independence Stadium, Windhoek
		Scoreboard

1999-03-11	Golden Lions	23 - 11	Northern Free State	Ellis Park Stadium, Johannesburg
		Scoreboard

1999-03-11	Falcons	24 - 29	Pumas	Bosman Stadium, Brakpan
		Scoreboard

==== Round Five ====
1999-03-17	North West	20 - 26	Golden Lions	Oppenheimer Stadium, Orkney
		Scoreboard

1999-03-18	Blue Bulls	22 - 14	Namibia Kudus	Loftus Versfeld, Pretoria
	Try: Johan Roets, Frans Allers, John Williams; Con: Casper Steyn (2); Pen: Casper Steyn	Scoreboard

1999-03-18	Northern Free State	27 - 35	Falcons	North West Stadium, Welkom
		Scoreboard

1999-03-18	Pumas	15 - 30	Griqualand West	Johann van Riebeeck Stadium, Witbank
		Scoreboard

==== Round Six ====
1999-03-24	Northern Free State	22 - 14	Pumas	North West Stadium, Welkom
		Scoreboard

1999-03-25	Namibia Kudus	15 - 69	Golden Lions	Independence Stadium, Windhoek
		Scoreboard

1999-03-25	North West	33 - 31	Griqualand West	Olën Park, Potchefstroom
		Scoreboard

1999-03-25	Falcons	26 - 23	Blue Bulls	Bosman Stadium, Brakpan
	Try: Wilnand Vlok, Danie van der Walt; Con: Dawie du Toit (2); Pen: Dawie du Toit (4)	Scoreboard	Try: Casper Steyn; Pen: Casper Steyn (6)

==== Round Seven ====
1999-03-29	Namibia Kudus	29 - 52	Pumas	Independence Stadium, Windhoek
		Scoreboard

1999-03-29	Griqualand West	69 - 17	Northern Free State	Griqua Park, Kimberley
		Scoreboard

1999-03-30	Falcons	50 - 13	North West	Bosman Stadium, Brakpan
		Scoreboard

1999-04-01	Golden Lions	48 - 28	Blue Bulls	Ellis Park Stadium, Johannesburg
	Try: Kobus Engelbrecht, Jaco Booysen, Mac Masina, Dean Hall, Deon Strydom, Walter Minnaar, Marius Mostert; Con: Kobus Engelbrecht (2); Pen: Kobus Engelbrecht (3)	Scoreboard	Try: Casper Steyn, Juan Schoeman, Ashley Pieters; Con: Casper Steyn (2); Pen: Casper Steyn (3)

==== Round Eight ====
1999-04-07	Falcons	24 - 29	Golden Lions	Bosman Stadium, Brakpan
		Scoreboard

1999-04-08	Blue Bulls	47 - 38	Griqualand West	Loftus Versfeld, Pretoria
	Try: Johan Roets, McNeil Hendricks, Coenraad Groenewald, Peet Arnold (2), John Williams, Lourens Campher; Con: Robbie Rein (3); Pen: Robbie Rein (2)	Scoreboard	Try: Leon van der Heever (2), Wayne October, Edrich Lubbe, Pierre Uys; Con: Leon van der Heever (5); Pen: Leon van der Heever

1999-04-08	North West	28 - 38	Pumas	Olën Park, Potchefstroom
		Scoreboard

1999-04-08	Namibia Kudus	25 - 36	Northern Free State	Independence Stadium, Windhoek
		Scoreboard

==== Round Nine ====
1999-04-11	Pumas	51 - 22	Blue Bulls	Johann van Riebeeck Stadium, Witbank
	Try: Grant Bartle, Torros Pretorius (2), Piet Joubert, Francois Rossouw, Thys Stoltz, Draadkar de Lange; Con: Andries Fourie (4), Kallie Benadie; Pen: Andries Fourie, Kallie Benadie	Scoreboard	Try: Johan Roets, Jacques Olivier, Peet Arnold; Con: Robbie Rein (2); Pen: Robbie Rein

1999-04-11	Northern Free State	26 - 24	North West	North West Stadium, Welkom
		Scoreboard

1999-04-11	Griqualand West	28 - 44	Golden Lions	Griqua Park, Kimberley
		Scoreboard

1999-04-11	Falcons	64 - 24	Namibia Kudus	Bosman Stadium, Brakpan
		Scoreboard

==== Round Ten ====
1999-04-15	Golden Lions	23 - 18	Pumas	Ellis Park Stadium, Johannesburg
		Scoreboard

1999-04-15	Namibia Kudus	22 - 12	North West	Independence Stadium, Windhoek
		Scoreboard

1999-04-15	Blue Bulls	25 - 36	Northern Free State	Loftus Versfeld, Pretoria
	Try: Peet Arnold (2), Jaco Viljoen; Con: Robbie Rein (2); Pen: Robbie Rein (2)	Scoreboard	Try: Stuart Abbott, Gavin Passens (2), Zoy Edwards, Clarke Roberts; Con: Darryl Eigner (4); Pen: Darryl Eigner

1999-04-15	Falcons	37 - 13	Griqualand West	Bosman Stadium, Brakpan
		Scoreboard

==== Round Eleven ====
1999-04-21	Northern Free State	26 - 69	Golden Lions	North West Stadium, Welkom
		Scoreboard

1999-04-21	North West	41 - 45	Blue Bulls	Olën Park, Potchefstroom
	Try: AJ de Jager, Johan Calitz, Nico Röhrs (2), Piet van Rensburg, Hannes Human (2); Con: Jaco Coetzee (3)	Scoreboard	Try: Jan Cloete (2), Bernard Myburgh, Coenraad Groenewald, Peet Arnold, John Williams; Con: Jaco Viljoen (3); Pen: Jaco Viljoen (3)

1999-04-21	Pumas	37 - 10	Falcons	Johann van Riebeeck Stadium, Witbank
		Scoreboard

1999-04-22	Griqualand West	39 - 24	Namibia Kudus	Griqua Park, Kimberley
		Scoreboard

==== Round Twelve ====
1999-04-29	Namibia Kudus	26 - 60	Blue Bulls	Independence Stadium, Windhoek
		Scoreboard	Try: Jan Cloete, McNeil Hendricks, Juan Schoeman, Bernard Myburgh, Jaco Viljoen, Louis van Straaten, Danie Rossouw (2), Jaco Barnard; Con: Jaco Viljoen (6); Pen: Jaco Viljoen

1999-04-29	Griqualand West	40 - 18	Pumas	Griqua Park, Kimberley
		Scoreboard

1999-04-29	Golden Lions	31 - 23	North West	Ellis Park Stadium, Johannesburg
		Scoreboard

1999-04-29	Falcons	41 - 34	Northern Free State	Bosman Stadium, Brakpan
		Scoreboard

==== Round Thirteen ====
1999-05-05	Blue Bulls	10 - 53	Golden Lions	Loftus Versfeld, Pretoria
	Try: Wium Basson; Con: Jaco Viljoen; Pen: Jaco Viljoen	Scoreboard	Try: Kobus Engelbrecht, Jaco Booysen (3), Dean Hall, Jacques van Niekerk, Jannes Labuschagne, Joe Esterhuysen; Con: Kobus Engelbrecht (4), Hennie le Roux; Pen: Kobus Engelbrecht

1999-05-05	Northern Free State	22 - 46	Griqualand West	North West Stadium, Welkom
		Scoreboard

1999-05-06	Pumas	66 - 29	Namibia Kudus	Johann van Riebeeck Stadium, Witbank
		Scoreboard

1999-05-06	North West	20 - 26	Falcons	Fochville
		Scoreboard

==== Round Fourteen ====
1999-05-12	Blue Bulls	20 - 27	Falcons	Loftus Versfeld, Pretoria
	Try: Derick Grobbelaar, Lourens Campher; Con: Tiaan Snyman (2); Pen: Tiaan Snyman (2)	Scoreboard	Try: Francois Grootboom (2), Len van Riet, Ralf Schroeder; Con: Dawie du Toit (2); Pen: Dawie du Toit

1999-05-13	Griqualand West	37 - 5	North West	Griqua Park, Kimberley
		Scoreboard

1999-05-13	Golden Lions	55 - 20	Namibia Kudus	Ellis Park Stadium, Johannesburg
		Scoreboard

1999-05-14	Pumas	59 - 19	Northern Free State	Johann van Riebeeck Stadium, Witbank
		Scoreboard

=== Southern Section ===
==== Round one ====
1999-02-18	Free State Cheetahs	34 - 33	Natal Wildebeest	Vodacom Park, Bloemfontein
		Scoreboard

1999-02-18	Border	14 - 29	Western Province	Waverley Park, East London
		Scoreboard

1999-02-18	Eastern Province	20 - 18	SWD Eagles	Boet Erasmus Stadium, Port Elizabeth
		Scoreboard

==== Round two ====
1999-02-24	SWD Eagles	16 - 28	Boland	Outeniqua Park, George
		Scoreboard

1999-02-25	Natal Wildebeest	31 - 26	Border	Kings Park Stadium, Durban
		Scoreboard

1999-02-25	Western Province	26 - 17	Eastern Province	Faure Street Stadium, Paarl
		Scoreboard

==== Round three ====
1999-03-03	Eastern Province	14 - 30	Natal Wildebeest	Boet Erasmus Stadium, Port Elizabeth
		Scoreboard

1999-03-04	Free State Cheetahs	40 - 36	Border	Vodacom Park, Bloemfontein
		Scoreboard

1999-03-04	Boland	46 - 18	Western Province	Boland Stadium, Wellington
		Scoreboard

==== Round four ====
1999-03-10	Natal Wildebeest	33 - 12	Boland	Kings Park Stadium, Durban
		Scoreboard

1999-03-10	Western Province	25 - 13	SWD Eagles	Danie Craven Stadium, Stellenbosch
		Scoreboard

1999-03-11	Free State Cheetahs	24 - 40	Eastern Province	Vodacom Park, Bloemfontein
		Scoreboard

==== Round Five ====
1999-03-18	SWD Eagles	20 - 7	Natal Wildebeest	Outeniqua Park, George
		Scoreboard

1999-03-18	Eastern Province	11 - 3	Border	Boet Erasmus Stadium, Port Elizabeth
		Scoreboard

1999-03-20	Boland	34 - 10	Free State Cheetahs	Boland Stadium, Wellington
		Scoreboard

==== Round Six ====
1999-03-24	Natal Wildebeest	27 - 22	Western Province	Kings Park Stadium, Durban
		Scoreboard

1999-03-25	Free State Cheetahs	47 - 22	SWD Eagles	Vodacom Park, Bloemfontein
		Scoreboard

1999-03-25	Border	18 - 17	Boland	Waverley Park, East London
		Scoreboard

==== Round Seven ====
1999-04-01	Western Province	40 - 24	Free State Cheetahs	Newlands Stadium, Cape Town
		Scoreboard

1999-04-01	Boland	40 - 29	Eastern Province	Esselen Park, Worcester
		Scoreboard

1999-04-01	Border	12 - 39	SWD Eagles	Waverley Park, East London
		Scoreboard

==== Round Eight ====
1999-04-07	Natal Wildebeest	13 - 0	Free State Cheetahs	Kings Park Stadium, Durban
		Scoreboard

1999-04-08	SWD Eagles	10 - 22	Eastern Province	Outeniqua Park, George
		Scoreboard

1999-04-08	Western Province	33 - 40	Border	Newlands Stadium, Cape Town
		Scoreboard

==== Round Nine ====
1999-04-11	Boland	3 - 27	SWD Eagles	Esselen Park, Worcester
		Scoreboard

1999-04-11	Eastern Province	21 - 18	Western Province	Boet Erasmus Stadium, Port Elizabeth
		Scoreboard

1999-04-11	Border	9 - 13	Natal Wildebeest	Waverley Park, East London
		Scoreboard

==== Round Ten ====
1999-04-15	Border	28 - 12	Free State Cheetahs	Waverley Park, East London
		Scoreboard

1999-04-15	Natal Wildebeest	27 - 20	Eastern Province	Kings Park Stadium, Durban
		Scoreboard

1999-04-15	Western Province	16 - 26	Boland	Danie Craven Stadium, Stellenbosch
		Scoreboard

==== Round Eleven ====
1999-04-22	Boland	47 - 39	Natal Wildebeest	Boland Stadium, Wellington
		Scoreboard

1999-04-22	Eastern Province	17 - 10	Free State Cheetahs	Boet Erasmus Stadium, Port Elizabeth
		Scoreboard

1999-04-23	SWD Eagles	28 - 27	Western Province	Outeniqua Park, George
		Scoreboard

==== Round Twelve ====
1999-04-28	Natal Wildebeest	19 - 12	SWD Eagles	Kings Park Stadium, Durban
		Scoreboard

1999-04-29	Border	29 - 26	Eastern Province	Waverley Park, East London
		Scoreboard

1999-04-29	Free State Cheetahs	15 - 17	Boland	Vodacom Park, Bloemfontein
		Scoreboard

==== Round Thirteen ====
1999-05-06	SWD Eagles	56 - 16	Free State Cheetahs	Outeniqua Park, George
		Scoreboard

1999-05-06	Western Province	37 - 29	Natal Wildebeest	Newlands Stadium, Cape Town
		Scoreboard

1999-05-06	Boland	19 - 24	Border	Boland Stadium, Wellington
		Scoreboard

==== Round Fourteen ====
1999-05-13	Eastern Province	24 - 32	Boland	Boet Erasmus Stadium, Port Elizabeth
		Scoreboard

1999-05-13	SWD Eagles	28 - 23	Border	Outeniqua Park, George
		Scoreboard

1999-05-13	Free State Cheetahs	54 - 17	Western Province	Vodacom Park, Bloemfontein
		Scoreboard

=== Play-Offs ===
==== Semi-finals ====
1999-05-19	Boland	17 - 24	Griqualand West	Boland Stadium, Wellington
		Scoreboard

1999-05-19	Golden Lions	36 - 3	Natal Wildebeest	Ellis Park Stadium, Johannesburg
		Scoreboard

==== Final ====
1999-05-27	Golden Lions	73 - 7	Griqualand West	Ellis Park Stadium, Johannesburg
		Scoreboard

== Winners ==
1999
Vodacom Cup
CHAMPIONS
Golden Lions
1st title
