= 1998 Vodacom Cup =

- Countries: South Africa
- Date: 18 February – 6 May 1998
- Champions: Griqualand West (1st title)
- Runners-up: Golden Lions
- Matches played: 87

The 1998 Vodacom Cup was played between 18 February and 28 May 2014 and was the first edition of this annual domestic cup competition. This edition of the Vodacom Cup was played between the fourteen provincial rugby union teams in South Africa.

== Competition ==
There were fourteen teams participating in the 1998 Vodacom Cup. These teams were geographically divided into two sections - Section A (south-western section) and Section B (north-eastern section), with seven teams in each section. Teams played all the other teams in their section twice over the course of the season, once at home and once away.

Teams received four log points for a win and two log points for a draw. Bonus log points were awarded to teams that scored four or more tries in a game, as well as to teams that lost a match by seven points or less. Teams were ranked by log points, then points difference (points scored less points conceded).

The top two teams in each section qualified for the play-offs. In the semi-finals, the teams that finished first in each section had home advantage against the teams that finished second in the other section. The winners of these semi-finals then played each other in the final.

== Teams ==
Location of teams in 1998 Vodacom Cup
Section A
Section B

=== Team Listing ===
The following teams took part in the 1998 Vodacom Cup competition:

Section A
Team	Sponsored Name	Stadium/s	Sponsored Name
Boland	Boland	Boland Stadium, Wellington	Boland Stadium
Border	Border	Waverley Park, East London	Waverley Park
Eastern Province	Eastern Province	PE Stadium, Port Elizabeth	PE Stadium
Free State Cheetahs	Vodacom Free State Cheetahs	Free State Stadium, Bloemfontein	Vodacom Park
Griqualand West	Griqualand West	Griqua Park, Kimberley	ABSA Park
SWD Eagles	SWD Eagles	Outeniqua Park, George	Outeniqua Park
Western Province	Western Province	Newlands Stadium, Cape Town	Fedsure Park Newlands
Section B
Team	Sponsored Name	Stadium/s	Sponsored Name
Blue Bulls	Blue Bulls	Loftus Versfeld, Pretoria	Minolta Loftus
Golden Lions	Golden Lions	Ellis Park Stadium, Johannesburg	Ellis Park Stadium
Falcons	MTN Falcons	Bosman Stadium, Brakpan	Bosman Stadium
Mpumalanga Pumas	Mpumalanga Pumas	Johann van Riebeeck Stadium, Witbank	Johann van Riebeeck Stadium
Natal Wildebeest	Natal Wildebeest	Kings Park Stadium, Durban	Kings Park Stadium
Natal Wildebeest	Natal Wildebeest	University of Natal, Durban	University of Natal
North West	North West	Olën Park, Potchefstroom	Olën Park
Northern Free State	Northern Free State	North West Stadium, Welkom	North West Stadium

== Round-robin stage ==
=== Logs ===
The final logs at the completion of the round-robin stage were as follows:

1998 Vodacom Cup Section A log
Pos	Team	Pl	W	D	L	PF	PA	PD	TB	LB	Pts
1	Griqualand West	12	10	0	2	627	257	+370	9	2	51
2	SWD Eagles	12	9	0	3	401	220	+181	5	3	44
3	Boland	12	8	0	4	374	341	+33	6	1	39
4	Eastern Province	12	5	0	7	285	355	-70	3	3	26
5	Free State Cheetahs	12	4	0	8	277	471	-194	2	0	18
6	Border	12	3	0	9	194	428	-234	2	0	14
7	Western Province	12	3	0	9	343	429	-86	0	2	14
1998 Vodacom Cup Section B log
Pos	Team	Pl	W	D	L	PF	PA	PD	TB	LB	Pts
1	Golden Lions	12	9	0	3	512	290	+222	9	2	47
2	Natal Wildebeest	12	9	0	3	507	341	+166	11	0	47
3	Mpumalanga Pumas	12	8	1	3	392	275	+117	9	1	44
4	Falcons	12	7	1	4	379	345	+34	6	2	38
5	Blue Bulls	12	4	0	8	303	389	-86	1	1	18
6	Northern Free State	12	2	0	10	238	429	-191	1	3	12
7	North West	12	2	0	10	260	522	-262	2	0	10
* Legend: Pos = Position, Pl = Played, W = Won, D = Drawn, L = Lost, PF = Points for, PA = Points against, PD = Points difference, TF = Tries for, TA = Tries against, TB = Try bonus points, LB = Losing bonus points, Pts = Log points Golden Lions, Griqualand West, Natal Wildebeest and SWD Eagles qualified to the Semi-final games. Points breakdown: *4 points for a win *2 points for a draw *1 bonus point for a loss by seven points or less *1 bonus point for scoring four or more tries in a match

=== Results ===
==== Section A ====
===== Round one =====
18 February 1998	Griqualand West	55–26	Western Province	Griqua Park, Kimberley
		Scoreboard

19 February 1998	Border	15–29	Free State Cheetahs	Waverley Park, East London
		Scoreboard

19 February 1998	Eastern Province	20–24	SWD Eagles	PE Stadium, Port Elizabeth
		Scoreboard

Bye/s: Boland

===== Round two =====
25 February 1998	Free State Cheetahs	21–15	Eastern Province	Free State Stadium, Bloemfontein
		Scoreboard

25 February 1998	Western Province	52–13	Border	Newlands Stadium, Cape Town
		Scoreboard

26 February 1998	Boland	12–48	SWD Eagles	Boland Stadium, Wellington
		Scoreboard

Bye/s: Griqualand West

===== Round three =====
4 March 1998	Boland	33–22	Free State Cheetahs	Boland Stadium, Wellington
		Scoreboard

4 March 1998	Border	12–38	Griqualand West	Waverley Park, East London
		Scoreboard

4 March 1998	Eastern Province	28–7	Western Province	PE Stadium, Port Elizabeth
		Scoreboard

Bye/s: SWD Eagles

===== Round four =====
11 March 1998	Free State Cheetahs	14–53	SWD Eagles	Free State Stadium, Bloemfontein
		Scoreboard

11 March 1998	Griqualand West	80–12	Eastern Province	Griqua Park, Kimberley
		Scoreboard

12 March 1998	Western Province	21–29	Boland	Newlands Stadium, Cape Town
		Scoreboard

Bye/s: Border

===== Round five =====
18 March 1998	Border	19–14	Boland	Waverley Park, East London
		Scoreboard

18 March 1998	Griqualand West	33–31	SWD Eagles	Griqua Park, Kimberley
		Scoreboard		Attendance: 1,000; Referee: Steve Stalk

18 March 1998	Western Province	46–19	Free State Cheetahs	Newlands Stadium, Cape Town
		Scoreboard

Bye/s: Eastern Province

===== Round six =====
22 March 1998	Boland	39–71	Griqualand West	Boland Stadium, Wellington
		Scoreboard		Attendance: 2,500; Referee: Andries Pieterse

22 March 1998	Eastern Province	20–7	Border	PE Stadium, Port Elizabeth
		Scoreboard		Attendance: 1,000; Referee: Pieter De Bruin

22 March 1998	SWD Eagles	38–8	Western Province	Outeniqua Park, George
		Scoreboard		Attendance: 2,000; Referee: Dudley Stuurman

Bye/s: Free State Cheetahs

===== Round seven =====
26 March 1998	Boland	48–13	Eastern Province	Boland Stadium, Wellington
		Scoreboard		Attendance: 750; Referee: Steve Stalk

26 March 1998	Griqualand West	64–17	Free State Cheetahs	Griqua Park, Kimberley
		Scoreboard

26 March 1998	SWD Eagles	26–7	Border	Outeniqua Park, George
		Scoreboard

Bye/s: Western Province

===== Round eight =====
1 April 1998	Free State Cheetahs	41–19	Border	Free State Stadium, Bloemfontein
		Scoreboard

1 April 1998	Western Province	26–62	Griqualand West	Newlands Stadium, Cape Town
		Scoreboard

2 April 1998	SWD Eagles	21–7	Eastern Province	Outeniqua Park, George
		Scoreboard		Attendance: 500; Referee: K Rautenbach

Bye/s: Boland

===== Round nine =====
6 April 1998	Eastern Province	53–19	Free State Cheetahs	PE Stadium, Port Elizabeth
		Scoreboard

7 April 1998	Border	25–34	Western Province	Waverley Park, East London
		Scoreboard

9 April 1998	SWD Eagles	24–26	Boland	Outeniqua Park, George
		Scoreboard

Bye/s: Griqualand West

===== Round ten =====
15 April 1998	Griqualand West	83–14	Border	Griqua Park, Kimberley
		Scoreboard		Attendance: 500; Referee: Charlton Pick

15 April 1998	Western Province	20–35	Eastern Province	Newlands Stadium, Cape Town
		Scoreboard		Attendance: 500; Referee: Dudley Stuurman

16 April 1998	Free State Cheetahs	25–33	Boland	Free State Stadium, Bloemfontein
		Scoreboard		Attendance: 500; Referee: Peet Badenhorst

Bye/s: SWD Eagles

===== Round eleven =====
23 April 1998	Boland	29–28	Western Province	Boland Stadium, Wellington
		Scoreboard

23 April 1998	Eastern Province	36–31	Griqualand West	PE Stadium, Port Elizabeth
		Scoreboard

23 April 1998	SWD Eagles	44–19	Free State Cheetahs	Outeniqua Park, George
		Scoreboard

Bye/s: Border

===== Round twelve =====
29 April 1998	Border	36–18	Eastern Province	Waverley Park, East London
		Scoreboard

29 April 1998	Western Province	40–59	SWD Eagles	Newlands Stadium, Cape Town
		Scoreboard

30 April 1998	Griqualand West	35–12	Boland	Griqua Park, Kimberley
		Scoreboard

Bye/s: Free State Cheetahs

===== Round thirteen =====
6 May 1998	Boland	58–7	Border	Boland Stadium, Wellington
		Scoreboard

6 May 1998	SWD Eagles	18–14	Griqualand West	Outeniqua Park, George
		Scoreboard

7 May 1998	Free State Cheetahs	37–35	Western Province	Free State Stadium, Bloemfontein
		Scoreboard

Bye/s: Eastern Province

===== Round fourteen =====
13 May 1998	Eastern Province	28–41	Boland	PE Stadium, Port Elizabeth
		Scoreboard

13 May 1998	Free State Cheetahs	14–61	Griqualand West	Free State Stadium, Bloemfontein
		Scoreboard

14 May 1998	Border	20–15	SWD Eagles	Waverley Park, East London
		Scoreboard

Bye/s: Western Province

==== Section B ====
===== Round one =====
18 February 1998	Mpumalanga Pumas	15–7	Northern Free State	Johann van Riebeeck Stadium, Witbank
		Scoreboard

19 February 1998	Falcons	38–27	North West	Bosman Stadium, Brakpan
		Scoreboard

19 February 1998	Natal Wildebeest	25–6	Blue Bulls	University of Natal, Durban
	Try: Trevor Halstead, Jaco van der Westhuyzen, Jonno Brayley, Brad McLeod-Henderson, Chris Pearson	Scoreboard	Pen: Roland de Marigny, Clive Terre Blanche

Bye/s: Golden Lions

===== Round two =====
25 February 1998	Northern Free State	37–27	Golden Lions	North West Stadium, Welkom
		Scoreboard

25 February 1998	North West	27–48	Natal Wildebeest	Olën Park, Potchefstroom
		Scoreboard

26 February 1998	Blue Bulls	22–29	Mpumalanga Pumas	Loftus Versfeld, Pretoria
	Try: Torros Pretorius; Con: Roland de Marigny; Pen: Roland de Marigny (5)	Scoreboard	Try: Riaan Potgieter, Billy Beukes, Arni van Rooyen, Francois Rossouw; Con: Heinz Pflügler (3); Pen: Andries Fourie

Bye/s: Falcons

===== Round three =====
4 March 1998	Blue Bulls	59–24	Northern Free State	Loftus Versfeld, Pretoria
	Try: Thys Potgieter (2), Archer Dames, Johann Schütte, Grant Esterhuizen (2), Victor Matfield; Con: Roland de Marigny (5), Clive Terre Blanche; Pen: Roland de Marigny (4)	Scoreboard	Try: Alistair Alexander, Anthony Ireland (2); Con: Eric Herbert (3); Pen: Eric Herbert

4 March 1998	North West	21–38	Golden Lions	Olën Park, Potchefstroom
		Scoreboard

5 March 1998	Falcons	18–18	Mpumalanga Pumas	Bosman Stadium, Brakpan
		Scoreboard

Bye/s: Natal Wildebeest

===== Round four =====
11 March 1998	Mpumalanga Pumas	54–24	North West	Johann van Riebeeck Stadium, Witbank
		Scoreboard

11 March 1998	Natal Wildebeest	41–6	Falcons	Kings Park Stadium, Durban
		Scoreboard

12 March 1998	Golden Lions	36–20	Blue Bulls	Ellis Park Stadium, Johannesburg
	Try: FP Naudé, Diaan Kruger, Faan Muller, Owen Nkumane, Willem Stoltz; Con: FP Naudé, Johan Roux, Jaco Booysen	Scoreboard	Try: Roland de Marigny, Gerhard Laufs; Con: Roland de Marigny (2); Pen: Roland de Marigny (2)

Bye/s: Northern Free State

===== Round five =====
18 March 1998	Blue Bulls	26–34	North West	Loftus Versfeld, Pretoria
	Try: Jannie Claassens (2), Gerhard Laufs; Con: Clive Terre Blanche; Pen: Roland de Marigny (3)	Scoreboard	Try: Markus van Greunen, Willie Enslin, Lourens Muller; Con: Bertus Kruger (2); Pen: Bertus Kruger (5)

19 March 1998	Falcons	55–12	Northern Free State	Bosman Stadium, Brakpan
		Scoreboard		Attendance: 500

19 March 1998	Natal Wildebeest	24–46	Golden Lions	Kings Park
		Scoreboard		Attendance: 750; Referee: Steve Stalk

Bye/s: Mpumalanga Pumas

===== Round six =====
22 March 1998	Golden Lions	47–33	Falcons	Ellis Park Stadium, Johannesburg
		Scoreboard		Attendance: 500; Referee: Dudley Stuurman

22 March 1998	Mpumalanga Pumas	49–21	Natal Wildebeest	Johann van Riebeeck Stadium, Witbank
		Scoreboard		Attendance: 750; Referee: Jerome America

22 March 1998	Northern Free State	26–16	North West	North West Stadium, Welkom
		Scoreboard		Attendance: 3,000; Referee: Peet Badenhorst

Bye/s: Blue Bulls

===== Round seven =====
25 March 1998	Golden Lions	24–23	Mpumalanga Pumas	Ellis Park Stadium, Johannesburg
		Scoreboard		Attendance: 500; Referee: K Rautenbach

26 March 1998	Falcons	35–28	Blue Bulls	Bosman Stadium, Brakpan
	Try: Werner Geyer (4); Con: Len van Riet (3); Pen: Len van Riet (2), Jaco Viljoen	Scoreboard	Try: Jannie Claassens, Matthys Bekker, Torros Pretorius; Con: Roland de Marigny (2); Pen: Roland de Marigny (3)	Attendance: 1,000; Referee: Peet Badenhorst

Rescheduled	19 April 1998	Northern Free State	23–24	Natal Wildebeest	North West Stadium, Welkom
			Scoreboard		Attendance: 750

Bye/s: North West

===== Round eight =====
1 April 1998	Northern Free State	10–40	Mpumalanga Pumas	North West Stadium, Welkom
		Scoreboard

1 April 1998	North West	17–32	Falcons	Olën Park, Potchefstroom
		Scoreboard		Attendance: 200

2 April 1998	Blue Bulls	27–57	Natal Wildebeest	Loftus Versfeld, Pretoria
	Try: Thys Potgieter (2), Johann Schütte (2); Con: Roland de Marigny (2); Pen: Roland de Marigny	Scoreboard	Try: Dirkie Strydom, Clarke Manuel, Kevin Schraader, JP van der Mescht (2), Cabous van der Westhuizen, Jaco van der Westhuyzen, Ryan Strudwick, Chris Pearson; Con: Dirkie Strydom (6)	Attendance: 300; Referee: Phillip Anthony Bosch

Bye/s: Golden Lions

===== Round nine =====
5 April 1998	Golden Lions	54–14	Northern Free State	Ellis Park Stadium, Johannesburg
		Scoreboard		Attendance: 500; Referee: Charlton Pick

7 April 1998	Mpumalanga Pumas	31–9	Blue Bulls	Johann van Riebeeck Stadium, Witbank
	Try: Arni van Rooyen, Piet Joubert, Francois Rossouw, Draadkar de Lange, Heinz Pflügler; Con: Ian Noble (3)	Scoreboard	Pen: Roland de Marigny (3)	Attendance: 1,000; Referee: F Grobbelaar

9 April 1998	Natal Wildebeest	92–8	North West	University of Natal, Durban
		Scoreboard		Attendance: 1,000; Referee: Jerome America

Bye/s: Falcons

===== Round ten =====
15 April 1998	Blue Bulls	10–51	Golden Lions	Loftus Versfeld, Pretoria
	Try: Torros Pretorius; Con: Johan Pienaar; Pen: Johan Pienaar	Scoreboard	Try: Kobus Engelbrecht (3), Jaco Booysen, Wickus Venter (2), Johan Roux, Diaan Kruger; Con: Kobus Engelbrecht, Johan Roux (3); Pen: Kobus Engelbrecht	Attendance: 2,000; Referee: Andries Pieterse

15 April 1998	Falcons	32–33	Natal Wildebeest	Bosman Stadium, Brakpan
		Scoreboard		Attendance: 1,500; Referee: Stephanus Dough

15 April 1998	North West	18–36	Mpumalanga Pumas	Olën Park, Potchefstroom
		Scoreboard		Attendance: 2,000; Referee: Pieter De Bruin

Bye/s: Northern Free State

===== Round eleven =====
22 April 1998	Golden Lions	66–6	North West	University of Natal, Durban
		Scoreboard

22 April 1998	Mpumalanga Pumas	34–42	Falcons	Johann van Riebeeck Stadium, Witbank
		Scoreboard

22 April 1998	Northern Free State	14–24	Blue Bulls	North West Stadium, Welkom
	Try: Alistair Alexander, Zoy Edwards; Con: Eric Herbert (2)	Scoreboard	Try: Thys Potgieter, John Camp (2), Torros Pretorius; Con: Johan Pienaar (2)

Bye/s: Natal Wildebeest

===== Round twelve =====
27 April 1998	North West	29–24	Northern Free State	Olën Park, Potchefstroom
		Scoreboard

28 April 1998	Falcons	44–38	Golden Lions	Bosman Stadium, Brakpan
		Scoreboard

29 April 1998	Natal Wildebeest	52–33	Mpumalanga Pumas	University of Natal, Durban
		Scoreboard

Bye/s: Blue Bulls

===== Round thirteen =====
6 May 1998	Blue Bulls	30–20	Falcons	Loftus Versfeld, Pretoria
	Try: Grant Esterhuizen, Torros Pretorius (2); Con: Roland de Marigny (3); Pen: Roland de Marigny (3)	Scoreboard	Try: Francois Grootboom, Eugene Meyer, Deon de Kock; Con: Rynhard van As; Pen: Rynhard van As

6 May 1998	Mpumalanga Pumas	30–28	Golden Lions	Johann van Riebeeck Stadium, Witbank
		Scoreboard

8 May 1998	Natal Wildebeest	62–27	Northern Free State	University of Natal, Durban
		Scoreboard

Bye/s: North West

===== Round fourteen =====
13 May 1998	North West	33–42	Blue Bulls	Olën Park, Potchefstroom
	Try: AC Prinsloo, Tiaan Joubert (2), Bertus Pool, Hannes Human; Con: JB van den Berg; Pen: JB van den Berg; Drop: AC Prinsloo	Scoreboard	Try: John Camp, Grant Esterhuizen (2), Matt Pennefather, Johan Pienaar (2); Con: Roland de Marigny (6)

14 May 1998	Golden Lions	57–28	Natal Wildebeest	Ellis Park Stadium, Johannesburg
		Scoreboard

14 May 1998	Northern Free State	20–24	Falcons	North West Stadium, Welkom
		Scoreboard

Bye/s: Mpumalanga Pumas

== Play-Offs ==
=== Semi-finals ===
20 May 1998	Golden Lions	31–19	SWD Eagles	Ellis Park Stadium, Johannesburg
		Scoreboard

21 May 1998	Griqualand West	47–28	Natal Wildebeest	Griqua Park, Kimberley
		Scoreboard

=== Final ===
28 May 1998	Griqualand West	57–0	Golden Lions	Griqua Park, Kimberley
		Scoreboard

== Winners ==
1998 Vodacom Cup
CHAMPIONS
Griqualand West
First Title
