= Vodacom Cup =

Defunct rugby union competition in South Africa

- Competition logo
- Sport: Rugby union
- Founded: 1998
- First season: 1998
- Folded: 2015
- No. of teams: 16
- Country: South Africa; Namibia; Argentina; Kenya
- Last champion: Pumas
- Most titles: Golden Lions / Griquas (5)
- Sponsor: Vodacom
- Related competitions: Currie Cup

The Vodacom Cup was an annual rugby union competition in South Africa. Annual Vodacom Cup competitions were played between its inaugural season in 1998 and 2015 and was contested between February and May each year. The Vodacom Cup was the successor of the Bankfin Nite Series which was played in 1996 and 1997. Mobile communications provider Vodacom was the title sponsor for the entire duration of the competition.

The competition was the third most prestigious in South African rugby, behind Super Rugby and the Currie Cup. It was contested at roughly the same time as Super Rugby each season from February to June and featured a combination of Super Rugby players returning from injury, reserve players attempting to maintain their fitness levels and younger players trying to break through to the Super Rugby or Currie Cup sides. It therefore served as an important developmental competition for South African rugby.

The competition was held every season between the fourteen South African rugby unions, but several additional teams also took part during the competition's history. The Limpopo Blue Bulls, officially a sub-union of the Blue Bulls, took part as a separate team between 2013 and 2015. Namibian side the Welwitschias played in the competition between 1999 and 2001, in 2010, 2011 and in 2015. Argentine side Pampas XV participated in the competition between 2010 and 2013 and a Simba XV from Kenya competed in 2014.

The most successful teams in the history of the competition were Griquas and the Golden Lions, each winning it on five occasions. The Golden Lions also won the competition for three consecutive seasons between 2002 and 2004.

Between 2001 and 2004, the competition was split into two tier, with the top half of teams competing for the Vodacom Cup and the bottom half competing for the Vodacom Shield.

The final edition of the competition was in 2015, with SARU deciding to restructure the domestic competitions from the 2016 season onwards. A competition called the Rugby Challenge succeeded the Vodacom Cup in 2017.

The Vodacom Cup logo 1998–2010

== Teams ==
The results of the teams that participated in the Vodacom Cup throughout the competition's history is as follows:

Vodacom Cup 1998–2015
| Team | 1998 | 1999 | 2000 | 2001 | 2002 | 2003 | 2004 | 2005 | 2006 | 2007 | 2008 | 2009 | 2010 | 2011 | 2012 | 2013 | 2014 | 2015 |
|---|---|---|---|---|---|---|---|---|---|---|---|---|---|---|---|---|---|---|
| Blue Bulls | | | | 1st | 2nd | 2nd | 2nd | | | 2nd | 1st | 2nd | 1st | 2nd | | | | |
| Boland Cavaliers | | | | 2nd | | | | | | | | | | | | | | |
| Border Bulldogs | | | | | | | | | | | | | | | | | | |
| Eastern Province Kings | | | | | | | | | | | | | | | | | | |
| Falcons | | | | | | | | | 1st | | | | | | | | | |
| Free State XV | | | 1st | | | | | | | | 2nd | | 2nd | | | | | |
| Golden Lions | 2nd | 1st | | | 1st | 1st | 1st | | | | | | | | | 1st | 2nd | |
| Griffons | | | | | | | | | | | | | | | | | | |
| Griquas | 1st | 2nd | 2nd | | | | | 1st | | 1st | | 1st | | | 2nd | | 1st | |
| Leopards XV | | | | | | | | 2nd | | | | | | | | | | |
| Limpopo Blue Bulls | —N/a | —N/a | —N/a | —N/a | —N/a | —N/a | —N/a | —N/a | —N/a | —N/a | —N/a | —N/a | —N/a | —N/a | —N/a | | | |
| (Argentina) Pampas XV | —N/a | —N/a | —N/a | —N/a | —N/a | —N/a | —N/a | —N/a | —N/a | —N/a | —N/a | —N/a | | 1st | | | —N/a | —N/a |
| Pumas | | | | | | | | | | | | | | | | 2nd | | 1st |
| Sharks XV | | | | | | | | | 2nd | | | | | | | | | |
| (Kenya) Simba XV | —N/a | —N/a | —N/a | —N/a | —N/a | —N/a | —N/a | —N/a | —N/a | —N/a | —N/a | —N/a | —N/a | —N/a | —N/a | —N/a | | —N/a |
| SWD Eagles | | | | | | | | | | | | | | | | | | |
| (Namibia) Welwitschias | —N/a | | | | —N/a | —N/a | —N/a | —N/a | —N/a | —N/a | —N/a | —N/a | | | —N/a | —N/a | —N/a | |
| Western Province | | | | | | | | | | | | | | | 1st | | | 2nd |
| Key: | Champion | | Runner-up | | Lost in SF | | Lost in QF | | Did not enter | | | | | | | | | |
Some teams played under different names. Each team's record is shown against the team name as per the 2015 Vodacom Cup.

=== Finals ===
The results of the finals played in the Vodacom Cup competition are as follows:

Vodacom Cup finals
| Season | Winner | Score | Runner-Up |
|---|---|---|---|
| 1998 | Griqualand West | 57–0 | Golden Lions |
| 1999 | Golden Lions | 73–7 | Griqualand West |
| 2000 | Free State Cheetahs | 44–24 | Griqualand West |
| 2001 | Blue Bulls | 42–24 | Boland Cavaliers |
| 2002 | Golden Lions | 54–38 | Blue Bulls |
| 2003 | Golden Lions | 26–17 | Blue Bulls |
| 2004 | Golden Lions | 35–16 | Blue Bulls |
| 2005 | Griquas | 27–25 | Leopards |
| 2006 | Falcons | 25–17 | Natal Wildebeest |
| 2007 | Griquas | 33–29 | Blue Bulls |
| 2008 | Blue Bulls | 25–21 | Free State Cheetahs |
| 2009 | Griquas | 28–19 | Blue Bulls |
| 2010 | Blue Bulls | 31–29 | Free State Cheetahs |
| 2011 | Pampas XV | 14–9 | Blue Bulls |
| 2012 | Western Province | 20–18 | Griquas |
| 2013 | Golden Lions | 42–28 | Pumas |
| 2014 | Griquas | 30–6 | Golden Lions |
| 2015 | Pumas | 24–7 | Western Province |

== The Vodacom Cup Trophy ==
=== Overall Record ===
The overall record for the teams in the Vodacom Cup competition is as follows:

Vodacom Cup Overall Record
| Ranking | Team Name | Champions | Runner-Up | Semi-Final | Quarter Final |
|---|---|---|---|---|---|
| 1 | Griquas | 5 (1998, 2005, 2007, 2009, 2014) | 3 | 3 | 3 |
| 2 | Golden Lions | 5 (1999, 2002, 2003, 2004, 2013) | 2 | 1 | 6 |
| 3 | Blue Bulls | 3 (2001, 2008, 2010) | 6 | 4 | 2 |
| 4 | Free State Cheetahs | 1 (2000) | 2 | 3 | 5 |
| 5 | Western Province | 1 (2012) | 1 | 3 | 5 |
| 6 | Pumas | 1 (2015) | 1 | 3 | 1 |
| 7 | Falcons | 1 (2006) | 0 | 3 | 0 |
| 8 | Pampas XV | 1 (2011) | 0 | 0 | 2 |
| 9 | Sharks XV | 0 | 1 | 5 | 4 |
| 10 | Boland Cavaliers | 0 | 1 | 4 | 3 |
| 11 | Leopards | 0 | 1 | 3 | 3 |
| 12 | Eastern Province Kings | 0 | 0 | 1 | 3 |
| 12 | SWD Eagles | 0 | 0 | 1 | 3 |
| 14 | Border Bulldogs | 0 | 0 | 0 | 0 |
| 14 | Griffons | 0 | 0 | 0 | 0 |
| 14 | Limpopo Blue Bulls | 0 | 0 | 0 | 0 |
| 14 | Simba XV | 0 | 0 | 0 | 0 |
| 14 | Welwitschias | 0 | 0 | 0 | 0 |

== Vodacom Shield ==
From 2001 to 2004, the teams finishing outside the top 4 in the pool phases played in a secondary competition called the Vodacom Shield.

=== Finals ===
The results of the finals played in the Vodacom Shield competition are as follows:

Vodacom Cup finals
| Season | Winner | Score | Runner-Up |
|---|---|---|---|
| 2001 | Griffons | 40–27 | Mighty Elephants |
| 2002 | Mighty Elephants | 26–20 | Natal |
| 2003 | Border Bulldogs | 32–0 | Griquas |
| 2004 | Boland Cavaliers | 19–12 | SWD Eagles |

=== Overall Record ===
The overall record for the teams in the Vodacom Cup competition is as follows:

Vodacom Shield Overall Record
| Ranking | Team Name | Champions | Runner-Up | Semi-Final |
|---|---|---|---|---|
| 1 | Eastern Province Kings | 1 (2002) | 1 | 1 |
| 2 | Border Bulldogs | 1 (2003) | 0 | 1 |
| 3 | Boland Cavaliers | 1 (2004) | 0 | 0 |
| 3 | Griffons | 1 (2001) | 0 | 0 |
| 5 | Griquas | 0 | 1 | 1 |
| 5 | SWD Eagles | 0 | 1 | 1 |
| 7 | Sharks XV | 0 | 1 | 0 |
| 8 | Western Province | 0 | 0 | 2 |
| 9 | Leopards | 0 | 0 | 1 |
| 9 | Pumas | 0 | 0 | 1 |
| 11 | Falcons | 0 | 0 | 0 |

== See also ==
- Bankfin Nite Series
- SuperSport Rugby Challenge
