= Eastern Province Elephants =

South African provincial rugby union team, based in Port Elizabeth (Gqeberha)

(South Africa) Eastern Province Elephants
- Union: Eastern Province Rugby Union
- Nickname: Elephants
- Founded: 1888; 138 years ago
- Region: Western half of the Eastern Cape, South Africa
- Ground: Nelson Mandela Bay Stadium (Capacity: 48,000)
- Coach: Allister Coetzee
- League(s): Currie Cup First Division; SA Cup
- 2026 CC 2026 SA: Semi-finalist; 2nd 7th
Team kit

Official website
- eprugby.co.za
- Current season

The Eastern Province Elephants (Afrikaans: Oostelike Provinsie Olifante), known as the Multisure Eastern Province Elephants for sponsorship reasons, are a South African rugby union team that participates in the annual Currie Cup and Rugby Challenge competitions. They are governed by the Eastern Province Rugby Union (EPRU or EP Rugby). The team represents the Western half of the Eastern Cape province, and they play their home games at the Nelson Mandela Bay Stadium in Port Elizabeth.

In February 2018, the EPRU announced that the name of the team would revert to Eastern Province Elephants for the 2018 season.

== History ==
The Eastern Province Rugby Football Union was founded in 1888. The team was originally a representative team, drawing players from within the provincial union area's local clubs.

=== Professionalism and Super Rugby ===
The team was known as the Eastern Province Kings from 2010 to 2017

However, with the advent of professionalism in rugby union in 1995, the team contracted players from various areas. The Eastern Province Elephants is a professional team run by the EPRU, who are also responsible for junior representative rugby teams and administrative matters in the region.

Prior to 2010, they were known as the Mighty Elephants, but in order to align themselves with the Super Rugby side the Southern Kings, who were also governed by the EPRU, they changed their name to Eastern Province Kings. After the 2010 World Cup, they moved their offices to the new Port Elizabeth Stadium to establish their new headquarters. The team is the primary feeder to the Southern Kings, which also incorporates the Border Bulldogs and the SWD Eagles.

=== Financial problems and liquidation ===
After late payments of player salaries throughout most of the 2015 season, it came to a head in November 2015, when the EPRU failed to meet a final deadline imposed by the South African Rugby Players Association. All players' contracts were declared null and void, leading to an exodus of players. A few days later, the South African Rugby Union announced that they would take control of the affiliated Southern Kings Super Rugby franchise, and released an operational plan in early December which indicated that SARU would operate the franchise independently from the Eastern Province Kings.

After a petition handed to president Cheeky Watson, in which players announced their refusal to play for the Eastern Province Kings or Southern Kings until certain issues were sorted out, was not met, the South African Rugby Players' Association submitted a liquidation application in January 2016 against EP Rugby (Pty) Ltd on behalf of eighteen Eastern Province Kings players who were not included in the Southern Kings Super Rugby squad for 2016 and have not received their salaries since September 2015. The Port Elizabeth High Court provisionally liquidated Eastern Province Rugby in March 2016 and imposed a deadline of 10 May 2016 to pay outstanding player salaries, before the liquidation order would being made final.

The Eastern Province Kings submitted details of a rescue package to the High Court in May 2016, which saw the liquidation order being postponed until 4 August 2016. In July 2016, it emerged that the rescue package would not come to fruition and SARU withdrew their appeal against the final liquidation order. On 4 August 2016, the High Court ruled that the Eastern Province Kings should be liquidated.

Within hours of the liquidation being finalised, SARU released a statement that an Eastern Province Kings team funded by the Nelson Mandela Bay Municipality would continue to participate in the 2016 Currie Cup Premier Division.

== Stadium ==
The team was originally based at St George's Park. This was also where the first South African Rugby and Cricket Tests took place. They shared the ground with the Eastern Province cricket team.

In 1959, the EPRU decided to move the team to the then named Boet Erasmus Stadium and the inauguration took place in 1960 with the test between the Springboks and Scotland on 30 April 1960. The stadium was later named Telkom Park, due to a naming rights deal, and then renamed to the current name, the EPRU Stadium. The team played most home matches at the stadium, with a few hosted at other venues in Port Elizabeth and surrounding towns. During the late 2000s, the team shared the stadium with football (soccer) club Bay United.

In 2009, the team played its first match at their current home, the Nelson Mandela Bay Stadium.

== Honours ==
- Vodacom Shield champions: 2002 Vodacom Shield
  - Vodacom Shield runners-up: 2001 Vodacom Shield
- Currie Cup First Division champions: 2010, 2012
  - Currie Cup First Division runners-up: 2000, 2007, 2011, 2013, 2022, 2024

== Results by season ==
The table below indicates the Elephants' recent finishes. This includes games played as Eastern Province, Eastern Province Kings and Mighty Elephants.

Currie Cup
Season	Pool/group	No. of teams	Position	Play-off result
1988	Currie Cup Division A	7	6th	
1989	Currie Cup Division A	8	8th	
1990	Currie Cup Division A	8	5th	
1991	Currie Cup	6	6th	
1992	Currie Cup	6	6th	
1993	Currie Cup	6	3rd	
1994	Currie Cup	6	6th	
1995	Currie Cup	6	5th	
1996	Currie Cup Section A	7	5th	
1997	Currie Cup	14	14th	
1998	Currie Cup	14	9th	
1999	Currie Cup	14	7th	
2000	Currie Cup Section X	7	5th	
2000	Bankfin Cup^{1}	6	1st	Losing Finalists
2001	Currie Cup Section X	7	7th	
2001	Bankfin Cup^{1}	6	3rd	
2002	Currie Cup Section Y	7	7th	
2002	Bankfin Cup^{1}	6	3rd	
2003	Currie Cup Qualifying	8	6th	
2003	First Division	6	3rd	
2004	First Division	6	5th	
2005	Premier Division Section X	7	5th	
2005	First Division Section X^{2}	3	2nd	Losing semi-finalists
2006	First Division	6	4th	Losing finalists
2007	First Division	6	2nd	Losing finalists
2008	First Division	6	6th	
2009	First Division	6	4th	Losing semi-finalists
2010	First Division	6	2nd	Champions
2010	promotion/relegation	2	2nd	Failed to win promotion
2011	First Division	6	2nd	Losing finalists
2012	First Division	8	1st	Champions
2012	promotion/relegation	2	2nd	Failed to win promotion
2013	First Division	8	2nd	Losing finalists, promoted
2014	Premier Division	8	8th	
2015	Premier Division	8	7th	
2016	Premier Division	9	9th	Relegated
2017	First Division	8	8th	
2018	First Division	7	7th	
2019	First Division	8	3rd	Losing semi-finalists
2021	First Division	7	5th	Losing semi-finalists
2022	First Division	10	2nd	Losing finalists
2023	First Division	10	5th	
2024	First Division	6	6th	Losing finalists

^{1} Between 2000 and 2002, the top 4 in each section qualified for the Top 8 tournament, the bottom 3 in each section for the Bankfin Cup.
^{2} In 2005, the top 4 in each section qualified for the Premier Division, the bottom 3 in each section for the First Division.

Vodacom Cup / Rugby Challenge / SA Cup
Season	Pool/group	No. of teams	Position	Play-off result
1998	Vodacom Cup Section A	7	4th	
1999	Vodacom Cup Southern Section	7	4th	
2000	Vodacom Cup Southern Section	7	3rd	Losing quarter-finalists
2001	Vodacom Cup Section X	8	5th	
2001	Vodacom Shield^{1}	6	2nd	Losing Finalists
2002	Vodacom Cup Section X	7	6th	
2002	Vodacom Shield^{1}	6	3rd	Champions
2003	Vodacom Shield	7	4th	Losing semi-finalists
2004	Vodacom Shield	7	6th	
2005	Vodacom Cup Section X	7	7th	
2006	Vodacom Cup	14	12th	
2007	Vodacom Cup Southern Section	7	4th	Losing quarter-finalists
2008	Vodacom Cup Southern Section	7	6th	
2009	Vodacom Cup Southern Section	7	7th	
2010	Vodacom Cup Southern Section	8	6th	
2011	Vodacom Cup Southern Section	8	5th	
2012	Vodacom Cup Southern Section	8	3rd	Losing quarter-finalists
2013	Vodacom Cup Southern Section	8	3rd	Losing semi-finalists
2014	Vodacom Cup Southern Section	8	5th	
2015	Vodacom Cup Southern Section	8	5th	
2017	Rugby Challenge Southern Section	5	2nd	Losing quarter-finalists
2018	Rugby Challenge Southern Section	5	5th	
2019	Rugby Challenge Southern Section	8	5th	
2023	Mzansi Challenge	10	5th	
2024	SA Cup	10	9th	
2025	SA Cup	10	TBC	

^{1} Between 2001 and 2002, the top 4 in each section qualified for the Vodacom Top 8 tournament, the bottom 3 in each section for the Vodacom Shield.

Super 10
Season	Pool/group	No. of teams	Position	Play-off result
1994	Super 10 Pool A	5	5th	

== Records ==
Eastern Province Elephants records:

Team match records
Record	Opposition	Venue	Season	
Biggest win	Welwitschias	Adcock Stadium, Port Elizabeth	2001	110–17
Biggest Currie Cup win	Griffons	Nelson Mandela Bay Stadium, Port Elizabeth	2013	63–7
Heaviest defeat	Griquas	Griqua Park, Kimberley	1998	12–80
Heaviest Currie Cup defeat	Northern Transvaal		1984	3–65
Highest score	Welwitschias	Adcock Stadium, Port Elizabeth	2001	110
Most points conceded	Griquas	Griqua Park, Kimberley	1998	80
Most tries	Welwitschias	Adcock Stadium, Port Elizabeth	2001	16
Most Currie Cup tries	Griffons	Nelson Mandela Bay Stadium, Port Elizabeth	2011	11

Player match records
Record	Player	Opposition	Venue	Season	
Most points by a player	Hennie le Roux	Eastern Transvaal	Boet Erasmus Stadium, Port Elizabeth	1991	38
Most Currie Cup points by a player	Bertus Kruger	Western Transvaal		1996	29
Most tries by a player	Erich Knoetze	Stellaland	Rustenburg	1991	5
Most tries by a player	Frikkie Crous	Western Transvaal	Boet Erasmus Stadium, Port Elizabeth	1994	5
Most tries by a player	Norman Nelson	Falcons	Barnard Stadium, Kempton Park	2010	5

Team season records
Record	Matches	Season	
Most team points	in 27 matches	2012	875
Most Currie Cup team points	in 27 matches	2012	611
Most team tries	in 24 matches	2003	103
Most team tries	in 27 matches	2012	103
Most Currie Cup team tries	in 18 matches	2012	76

Player season records
Record	Player	Season	
Most points by a player	Bertus Kruger	1996	282
Most Currie Cup points by a player	Brett Hennessey	2002	153
Most tries by a player	Manie van Vuuren	1994	14
Most tries by a player	Henry Pedro	1998	14
Most tries by a player	Fabian Juries	2003	14
Most Currie Cup tries by a player	Henry Pedro	1998	13
Most Currie Cup tries by a player	Luke Watson	2012	13

Player career records
Record	Player	Seasons	
Most appearances	Barry Pinnock	1993–2002	173
Most points	Giepie van Zyl	1981–1988	1,126
Most Currie Cup points	Giepie van Zyl	1981–1988	755
Most tries	Norman Nelson	2006–2013	56
