= Sisa Dukashe Stadium =

Multi-purpose stadium in Mdantsane, South Africa

- Location: Mdantsane, East London, Eastern Cape, South Africa
- Capacity: 17,000

Tenant
- Border Bulldogs

The Sisa Dukashe Stadium is a multi-purpose stadium in Mdantsane, near KuGompo City in the Eastern Cape, South Africa. Its capacity as of 2017 was 17,000. It is used mostly for soccer matches as well as for rugby matches.

The stadium used to host Chippa United, but was stripped from the right to host Premiership matches by the Premier Soccer League in 2022.
