= Bosman Stadium =

Sports venue in Brakpan, South Africa

- Interactive map of Bosman Stadium
- Location: Brakpan
- Coordinates: 26.2320°S 28.3645°E
- Surface: Grass

Tenant
- South Africa national rugby league team

Bosman Stadium is a multi-use stadium in Brakpan, South Africa. The Falcons Currie Cup team has historically used this ground as their home base. The stadium is currently used for football and rugby matches.

Bosman Stadium hosted two 2017 Rugby League World Cup qualifiers between home team South Africa and Middle Eastern country Lebanon, to determine which team would qualify for the 2017 Rugby League World Cup.

== See also ==
- List of stadiums in South Africa
- List of African stadiums by capacity
