= Witbank Stadium =

Stadium in Witbank, South Africa

- Interactive map of Witbank Stadium
- Location: Jelico Street; Witbank, South Africa
- Coordinates: 25°53′02″S 29°12′52″E
- Capacity: 20,000 (at the rugby stadium); 15,000 (at the soccer stadium)

Tenant
- Mpumalanga Black Aces

Witbank Stadium is a multi-purpose stadium in Witbank, South Africa. It is currently used mostly for football matches and served as the home stadium of Mpumalanga Black Aces F.C. It was also the home stadium of Mpumalanga's rugby team, the Pumas, before they relocated to Nelspruit.

The stadium was initially known as the Johann van Riebeeck Stadium until 2000, before sponsorship deals saw its name changed to @lantic Park and Witbank Mica Stadium. When these sponsorship deals ended, it was known as the Puma Stadium before becoming the Witbank Stadium.
