= Outeniqua Park =

Multi-purpose stadium in George, South Africa

Coordinates: 33°57′11.60″S 22°26′51.44″E

Outeniqua Park Stadium
- Interactive map of Outeniqua Park Stadium
- Location: George, South Africa
- Capacity: 7,500

Tenant
- SWD Eagles (rugby team)

Outeniqua Park is a multi-purpose stadium in George, South Africa. It is currently used mostly for rugby union matches and was the home stadium of the South African leg of the IRB Sevens World Series from 2001 through 2010, after which it moved to Nelson Mandela Bay Stadium in Port Elizabeth.

The stadium is also home to the SWD Eagles rugby team, who compete in the Currie Cup. The stadium is able to hold 7,500 people.

== See also ==
- List of rugby league stadiums by capacity
- List of rugby union stadiums by capacity
