= North West Stadium =

Sports stadium in South Africa

- Interactive map of North West Stadium
- Location: Welkom, South Africa
- Coordinates: 27°58′36″S 26°41′35″E
- Capacity: 8,500

Tenant
- Griffons (rugby team)

North West Stadium (currently known as the Down Touch Investments Stadium for sponsorship reasons) is a sports stadium in Welkom, South Africa. It is the home ground of the Griffons who compete in the Currie Cup and SA Cup rugby union competitions. The stadium seats 8,500 people.
