= 1988 Santam Bank Trophy Division B =

Fourth tier of domestic South African rugby season

- Countries: South Africa
- Date: 30 April – 27 August 1988
- Champions: Far North
- Runners-up: Stellaland
- Promoted: Far North
- Relegated: None
- Matches played: 29

The 1988 Santam Bank Trophy Division B was the fourth tier of domestic South African rugby, below the two Currie Cup divisions and Division A.

== Teams ==
Location of teams in 1988 Santam Bank Trophy Division B

1988 Santam Bank Trophy Division B
Far North
Lowveld
North Western Cape
SARU
South Western Districts
Stellaland
Winelands

== Competition ==
=== Regular season and title play-offs ===
There were six participating teams in the Santam Bank Trophy Division B. These teams were split into two sections of either three of four teams each. Teams played the other teams in their section four times over the course of the season, twice at home and twice away. Teams received two points for a win and one point for a draw. The top team qualified for the section finals, played at the home venue of the higher-placed team, as well as the Division B finals.

=== Promotion play-offs ===
The Division B champion qualified for the promotion play-offs. That team played off against the team placed bottom in Division A over two legs. The winner over these two ties qualified for the 1989 Santam Bank Trophy Division A, while the losing team qualified for the 1989 Santam Bank Trophy Division B.

== Log ==
1988 Santam Bank Trophy Division B Section 1 Log
Pos	Team	Pl	W	D	L	PF	PA	PD	TF	TA	Pts
1	Stellaland	8	8	0	0	229	97	+132	34	11	16
2	South Western Districts	8	6	0	2	216	69	+147	31	10	12
3	SARU	8	3	0	5	116	173	−57	16	20	6
4	Winelands	8	0	0	8	71	313	−242	9	54	0
Stellaland qualified for the Division B Title Play-Off Final game and the Trophy Finals Semi-Final.
1988 Santam Bank Trophy Division A Section 2 Log
1	Far North	8	6	0	2	201	84	+117	27	6	12
2	Lowveld	8	3	0	5	124	130	−6	13	16	6
3	North Western Cape	8	2	0	6	90	181	−91	14	26	4
Far North qualified for the Division B Title Play-Off Final game and the Trophy Finals Semi-Final. Points breakdown: *2 points for a win *1 point for a draw

== Fixtures and Results ==
=== Round one ===
30 April 1988	Lowveld	13 – 9	Far North	Nelspruit

30 April 1988	North Western Cape	3 – 21	SARU	Upington

30 April 1988	Winelands	0 – 29	South Western Districts	Bredasdorp

Bye/s: Stellaland

=== Round two ===
7 May 1988	Far North	33 – 3	North Western Cape	Pietersburg

7 May 1988	South Western Districts	12 – 18	Stellaland	Mossel Bay

18 June 1988	SARU	47 – 10	Winelands	Port Elizabeth

Bye/s: Lowveld

=== Round three ===
14 May 1988	North Western Cape	3 – 13	Lowveld	Upington

14 May 1988	Stellaland	33 – 9	SARU	Rustenburg

14 May 1988	Winelands	12 – 37	Far North	Moorreesburg

Bye/s: South Western Districts

=== Round four ===
21 May 1988	Far North	16 – 12	Stellaland	Pietersburg

21 May 1988	Lowveld	18 – 16	Winelands	Nelspruit

21 May 1988	SARU	3 – 37	South Western Districts	Port Elizabeth

Bye/s: North Western Cape

=== Round Five ===
4 June 1988	Stellaland	18 – 16	Lowveld	Lichtenburg

4 June 1988	Winelands	14 – 27	North Western Cape	Malmesbury

4 June 1988	South Western Districts	12 – 23	Far North	Oudtshoorn

Bye/s: SARU

=== Round Six ===
11 June 1988	Far North	40 – 4	SARU	Pietersburg

11 June 1988	Lowveld	18 – 25	South Western Districts	Nelspruit

11 June 1988	North Western Cape	20 – 32	Stellaland	Upington

Bye/s: Winelands

=== Round Seven ===
2 July 1988	North Western Cape	4 – 23	South Western Districts	Upington

2 July 1988	SARU	20 – 15	Lowveld	Orkney

2 July 1988	Stellaland	36 – 13	Winelands	Lichtenburg

Bye/s: Far North

=== Round Eight ===
23 July 1988	Far North	18 – 15	Lowveld	Pietersburg

23 July 1988	South Western Districts	19 – 0	SARU	Mossel Bay

23 July 1988	Winelands	3 – 60	Stellaland	Caledon

Bye/s: North Western Cape

=== Round Nine ===
6 August 1988	SARU	12 – 16	Stellaland	Port Elizabeth

6 August 1988	North Western Cape	9 – 29	Far North	Upington

6 August 1988	South Western Districts	59 – 3	Winelands	Oudtshoorn

Bye/s: Lowveld

=== Round Ten ===
August 1988	Lowveld	16 – 21	North Western Cape	Nelspruit

Bye/s: Far North, SARU, Stellaland, South Western Districts, Winelands

=== Final ===
27 Augustus 1988	Far North	13 – 12	Stellaland	Pietersburg
		Report

== Santam Bank Trophy Finals ==
The top two teams from Division A and the top two teams from Division B qualified to the Trophy finals:

=== Semi-finals ===
3 September 1988	Stellaland	24 – 9	South Eastern Transvaal	Lichtenburg
		Report

3 September 1988	North Eastern Cape	22 – 15	Far North	Cradock
		Report

=== Final ===
10 September 1988	North Eastern Cape	26 – 12	Stellaland	Cradock
		Report

== Promotion play-offs ==
In the promotion play-offs, Northern Natal conceded the second leg to Far North, who won promotion to the Division A. Northern Natal were initially relegated to Division B, but due to the Currie Cup Division A's expansion to 8 teams, they retained their place.

17 September 1988	Northern Natal	13 – 32	Far North	Newcastle

== See also ==
- 1988 Currie Cup Division A
- 1988 Currie Cup Division B
- 1988 Lion Cup
- 1988 Santam Bank Trophy Division A
