= 1988 Santam Bank Trophy Division A =

Third tier of domestic South African rugby

- Countries: South Africa
- Date: 29 April – 27 August 1988
- Champions: South Eastern Transvaal
- Runners-up: North Eastern Cape
- Promoted: South Eastern Transvaal
- Relegated: None
- Matches played: 25

The 1988 Santam Bank Trophy Division A was the third tier of domestic South African rugby, below the two Currie Cup divisions.

== Teams ==
Location of teams in 1988 Santam Bank Trophy Division A

1988 Santam Bank Trophy Division A
Boland
Border
North Eastern Cape
Northern Natal
South Eastern Transvaal
Western Province League

== Competition ==
=== Regular season and title play-offs ===
There were six participating teams in the Santam Bank Trophy Division A. These teams were split into two sections of three teams each. Teams played the teams in their own section once over the course of the season and teams in the other section twice, once at home and once away. Teams received two points for a win and one point for a draw. The top team qualified for the Division A section finals, played at the home venue of the higher-placed team, as well as the Division A finals.

=== Promotion play-offs ===
The Division A champion qualified for the promotion play-offs. That team played off against the team placed sixth in the Currie Cup Division B over two legs. The winner over these two ties qualified for the 1989 Currie Cup Division B, while the losing team qualified for the 1989 Santam Bank Trophy Division A.

=== Relegation play-offs ===
The bottom team on the log with the worst record in their group qualified for the relegation play-offs. That team played off against the team that won the Santam Bank Trophy Division B over two legs. The winner over these two ties qualified for the 1989 Santam Bank Trophy Division A, while the losing team qualified for the 1989 Santam Bank Trophy Division B.

== Log ==
1988 Santam Bank Trophy Division A Section 1 Log
Pos	Team	Pl	W	D	L	PF	PA	PD	TF	TA	Pts
1	South Eastern Transvaal	8	6	0	2	161	130	+31	20	14	12
2	Boland	8	4	0	4	172	145	+27	20	18	8
3	Border	8	2	0	6	102	140	−38	9	17	4
South Eastern Transvaal qualified for the Division A Title play-off Final game and the Trophy Finals Semi-Final.
1988 Santam Bank Trophy Division A Section 2 Log
1	North Eastern Cape	8	6	0	2	145	108	+37	16	12	12
2	Western Province League	8	4	0	4	140	127	+13	19	12	8
3	Northern Natal	8	2	0	6	134	204	−70	14	25	4
North Eastern Cape qualified for the Division A Title play-off Final game and the Trophy Finals Semi-Final. Northern Natal qualified for the promotion/relegation play-off game. * Legend: Pos = Position, Pl = Played, W = Won, D = Drawn, L = Lost, PF = Points for, PA = Points against, PD = Points difference, TF = Tries for, TA = Tries against, Pts = Log points Points breakdown: *2 points for a win *1 point for a draw

== Fixtures and results ==
=== Round one ===
29 April 1988	South Eastern Transvaal	9 – 7	North Eastern Cape	Witbank

29 April 1988	Western Province League	25 – 28	Northern Natal	Cape Town

Bye/s: Boland, Border

=== Round two ===
6 May 1988	Border	6 – 12	South Eastern Transvaal	East London

7 May 1988	North Eastern Cape	21 – 16	Western Province League	Cradock

Bye/s: Boland, Northern Natal

=== Round three ===
13 May 1988	South Eastern Transvaal	32 – 24	Boland	Witbank

14 May 1988	Northern Natal	16 – 12	North Eastern Cape	Newcastle

Bye/s: Border, Western Province League

=== Round four ===
21 May 1988	Border	16 – 12	Northern Natal	East London

11 June 1988	Western Province League	19 – 10	South Eastern Transvaal	Cape Town

Bye/s: Boland, North Eastern Cape

=== Round five ===
4 June 1988	North Eastern Cape	17 – 12	Border	Cradock

4 June 1988	Northern Natal	19 – 35	Boland	Newcastle

Bye/s: South Eastern Transvaal, Western Province League

=== Round six ===
17 June 1988	Boland	27 – 13	Border	Wellington

18 June 1988	South Eastern Transvaal	43 – 18	Northern Natal	Witbank

Bye/s: North Eastern Cape, Western Province League

=== Round seven ===
2 July 1988	Border	14 – 20	Western Province League	East London

2 July 1988	North Eastern Cape	15 – 13	Boland	Cradock

Bye/s: Northern Natal, South Eastern Transvaal

=== Round eight ===
8 July 1988	Boland	9 – 3	Western Province League	Wellington

Bye/s: Border, North Eastern Cape, Northern Natal, South Eastern Transvaal

=== Round nine ===
23 July 1988	North Eastern Cape	22 – 9	South Eastern Transvaal	Cradock

23 July 1988	Northern Natal	13 – 19	Border	Newcastle

23 July 1988	Western Province League	19 – 9	Boland	Paarl

=== Round ten ===
30 July 1988	Western Province League	22 – 12	Border	Cape Town

Bye/s: Boland, North Eastern Cape, Northern Natal, South Eastern Transvaal

=== Round eleven ===
6 August 1988	Boland	32 – 10	Northern Natal	Wellington

6 August 1988	Border	10 – 17	North Eastern Cape	East London

6 August 1988	South Eastern Transvaal	24 – 16	Western Province League	Witbank

=== Round twelve ===
20 August 1988	Northern Natal	18 – 22	South Eastern Transvaal	Newcastle

20 August 1988	Boland	23 – 34	North Eastern Cape	Wellington

Bye/s: Border, Western Province League

=== Final ===
27 August 1988	South Eastern Transvaal	19 – 15	North Eastern Cape	Witbank
		Report

== Santam Bank Trophy Finals ==
The top two teams from Division A and the top two teams from Division B qualified to the Trophy finals:

=== Semi-finals ===
3 September 1988	Stellaland	24 – 9	South Eastern Transvaal	Lichtenburg
		Report

3 September 1988	North Eastern Cape	22 – 15	Far North	Cradock
		Report

=== Final ===
10 September 1988	North Eastern Cape	26 – 12	Stellaland	Cradock
		Report

== Promotion/relegation play-offs ==
=== Promotion play-offs ===
In the promotion play-offs, South Eastern Transvaal beat Eastern Free State on aggregate and won promotion to the Currie Cup Division B. Eastern Free State were initially relegated to the Division A, but due to the Currie Cup Division A's subsequent expansion to 8 teams, they retained their place.

17 September 1988	Eastern Free State	15–21	South Eastern Transvaal	Bethleham
		Report

24 September 1988	South Eastern Transvaal	39–12	Eastern Free State	Witbank
		Report

=== Relegation play-offs ===
In the relegation play-offs, Northern Natal conceded the second leg to Far North, who won promotion to the Division A. Northern Natal were initially relegated to Division B, but due to the Currie Cup Division A's expansion to 8 teams, they retained their place.

17 September 1988	Northern Natal	13 – 32	Far North	Newcastle

== See also ==
- 1988 Currie Cup Division A
- 1988 Currie Cup Division B
- 1988 Lion Cup
- 1988 Santam Bank Trophy Division B
