= 1987 Currie Cup =

Domestic rugby union competition

1987 Currie Cup Division A
- Countries: South Africa
- Champions: Northern Transvaal (14th title)
- Runners-up: Transvaal
- Relegated: Northern Free State

1987 Currie Cup Division B
- Champions: South West Africa
- Runners-up: Western Transvaal
- Promoted: South West Africa
- Relegated: None

The 1987 Currie Cup was the 49th edition of the Currie Cup, the premier annual domestic rugby union competition in South Africa.

The tournament was won by Northern Transvaal for the 14th time; they beat Transvaal 24–18 in the final at the Ellis Park Stadium in Johannesburg.

Naas Botha scored all the points for Northern Transvaal by kicking 4 penalties and 4 drop-goals.

== Teams ==
Location of teams in 1987 Currie Cup: Divisions A and B
Division A
Division B

1987 Currie Cup Division A
Eastern Province
Free State
Natal
Northern Free State
Northern Transvaal
Transvaal
Western Province

1987 Currie Cup Division B
Eastern Transvaal
Griqualand West
South West Africa
Vaal Triangle
Western Transvaal

== Competition ==
=== Regular season and title play-offs ===
There were seven participating teams in the 1987 Currie Cup Division A and five in the Division B. These teams played each other twice over the course of the season, once at home and once away. Teams received two points for a win and one point for a draw. The top two teams in Division A qualified for the title play-offs, along with the top team from Division B. In the semi-finals, the team that finished second in Division A had to play against the team that finished top of Division B, while the team that finished top of Division A had a bye through to the final. The top two teams in Division B qualified for the Division B finals.

The venue for the semi-final and the finals are determined by a rotation system. For example, if Team A and Team B played the final at the home venue of Team A on the previous occasion they met in a final, then Team B will host the next final, irrespective of log positions.

=== Promotion – Relegation play-offs ===
The bottom team on the respective logs qualified for the relegation play-offs. The Division A team played off against the team placed top in Division B. The winner of this match qualified for the 1988 Currie Cup Division A, while the losing team qualified for the 1988 Currie Cup Division B.

The bottom team on the Division B log qualified for the relegation play-offs. That team played off against the team that won the 1987 Santam Bank Trophy Division A over two legs. The winner over these two ties qualified for the 1988 Currie Cup Division B, while the losing team qualified for the 1988 Santam Bank Trophy Division A.

== Log ==
=== Division A ===
1987 Currie Cup Division A log
Pos	Team	Pld	W	D	L	PF	PA	PD	TF	TA	Pts	Qualification
1	Northern Transvaal	12	10	0	2	331	146	+185	29	16	20	Currie Cup final
2	Transvaal	12	9	1	2	320	203	+117	36	8	19	Currie Cup semi-final
3	Free State	12	8	0	4	228	244	−16	18	26	16	
4	Western Province	12	5	2	5	242	210	+32	29	18	12	
5	Eastern Province	12	5	0	7	205	296	−91	18	31	10	
6	Natal	12	2	1	9	185	272	−87	15	27	5	
7	Northern Free State	12	1	0	11	162	302	−140	13	32	2	Relegation play-off

Rules for classification: 2 points for a win, 1 point for a draw

=== Division B ===
1987 Currie Cup Division B log
Pos	Team	Pld	W	D	L	PF	PA	PD	TF	TA	Pts	Qualification
1	South West Africa	8	7	0	1	201	111	+90	22	10	14	Currie Cup semi-finals Division B finals Promotion play-off
2	Western Transvaal	8	6	0	2	245	131	+114	30	12	12	Division B finals
3	Vaal Triangle	8	4	0	4	135	151	−16	11	13	8	
4	Eastern Transvaal	8	2	0	6	118	202	−84	11	21	4	
5	Griqualand West	8	1	0	7	101	205	−104	6	24	2	Relegation play-off

Rules for classification: 2 points for a win, 1 point for a draw

== Division A: Finals and play-offs ==
=== Semi-final ===
As champions of Division B, South West Africa qualified to the semi-finals of the Currie Cup competition, where they met Division A runners-up Transvaal.

19 September 1987

South West Africa	9–12	Transvaal
	Report

South West Stadium, Windhoek

=== Final ===
26 September 1987

Transvaal	18–24	Northern Transvaal
Try: Hempas Rademeyer; Schalk Naude; Con: Liaan Kirkham 2 Pen: Liaan Kirkham 2	Report	Pen: Naas Botha 4 Drop: Naas Botha 4

Ellis Park Stadium, Johannesburg
Attendance: 67,000
Referee: Freek Burger

=== Relegation play-offs ===
In the relegation play-offs, South West Africa beat Northern Free State and won promotion to the Division A. Northern Free State were relegated to Division B.

South West Africa	68–18	Northern Free State
	Report

South West Stadium, Windhoek

== Division B: Final and play-offs ==
=== Final ===
12 September 1987

South West Africa	24–12	Western Transvaal
	Report

South West Stadium, Windhoek

=== Relegation play-offs ===
In the relegation play-offs, Griqualand West beat Eastern Free State on aggregate to retain their place in the 1988 Currie Cup Division B.

Griqualand West	21–12	Eastern Free State
	Report

De Beers Stadium, Kimberley

Eastern Free State	9–16	Griqualand West
	Report

Goble Park, Bethleham

== See also ==
- Currie Cup
