= 1989 Lion Cup =

Rugby union competition in South Africa

- Countries: South Africa
- Date: 22 March – 29 July 1989
- Champions: Western Province (3rd title)
- Runners-up: Northern Transvaal
- Matches played: 25

The 1989 Lion Cup was the seventh edition of the Lion Cup, the premier domestic rugby union knock-out competition in South Africa.

== Teams ==
All 26 South African provincial teams took part in this competition. They were ranked as follows:

1989 Lion Cup teams
Ranking	Team
1	Western Province
2	Northern Transvaal
3	Western Transvaal
4	Natal
5	Boland
6	Far North
7	Northern Free State
8	Transvaal
9	South West Africa
10	Eastern Transvaal
11	Eastern Province
12	Free State
13	South Western Districts
14	Lowveld
15	Vaal Triangle
16	South Eastern Transvaal
17	Stellaland
18	Eastern Free State
19	Griqualand West
20	North Eastern Cape
21	North Western Cape
22	Northern Natal
23	Border
24	Western Province League
25	Winelands
26	SARU

== Competition ==
This competition was a knock-out competition. The four teams ranked 23 to 26 played each other in the qualifying round with the two winners advancing to round one, where they joined the teams ranked 9 to 22. These sixteen teams played in eight matches, with the winners advancing to round two, where the top 8 ranked teams will join. In Round Two, the sixteen remaining teams would be reduced to eight and would be followed by the quarter-finals, semi-finals and the Final.

== Fixtures and results ==
The fixtures were as follows:

=== Qualifying round ===
22 March 1989	SARU	10–12	Border	Port Elizabeth
		Report

5 April 1989	Winelands	6–25	Western Province League	Moorreesburg
		Report

=== Round one ===
31 March 1989	Eastern Free State	18–39	South Eastern Transvaal	Bethlehem
		Report

1 April 1989	Border	11–15	South West Africa	East London
		Report

1 April 1989	Griqualand West	32–23	Eastern Province	Kimberley
		Report

1 April 1989	North Eastern Cape	27–15	Lowveld	Cradock
		Report

1 April 1989	Northern Natal	20–27	Eastern Transvaal	Newcastle
		Report

1 April 1989	North Western Cape	10–30	Vaal Triangle	Upington
		Report

1 April 1989	Stellaland	9–83	Free State	Lichtenburg
		Report

8 April 1989	Western Province League	44–15	South Western Districts	Elsie's River
		Report

Bye/s: Boland, Far North, Natal, Northern Free State, Northern Transvaal, Transvaal, Western Province, Western Transvaal

=== Round two ===
22 April 1989	Eastern Transvaal	0–27	Western Province	Pam Brink Stadium, Springs
		Report

22 April 1989	Free State	9–13	Northern Transvaal	Bloemfontein
		Report

22 April 1989	Griqualand West	37–6	Boland	Kimberley
		Report

22 April 1989	North Eastern Cape	3–26	Natal	Cradock
		Report

22 April 1989	South Eastern Transvaal	25–37	Western Transvaal	Witbank
		Report

22 April 1989	South West Africa	18–27	Transvaal	Windhoek
		Report

22 April 1989	Vaal Triangle	21–12	Far North	Sasolburg
		Report

22 April 1989	Western Province League	20–13	Northern Free State	Elsie's River
		Report

=== Quarter-finals ===
27 May 1989	Northern Transvaal	31–9	Griqualand West	Pretoria
		Report

27 May 1989	Transvaal	34–15	Natal	Johannesburg
		Report

27 May 1989	Western Province	55–9	Vaal Triangle	Newlands Stadium, Cape Town
		Report

27 May 1989	Western Province League	16–30	Western Transvaal	Paarl
		Report

=== Semi-finals ===
24 June 1989	Northern Transvaal	63–6	Western Transvaal	Loftus Versfeld, Pretoria
		Report

24 June 1989	Western Province	25–12	Transvaal	Newlands Stadium, Cape Town
		Report

=== Final ===
29 July 1989	Western Province	21–16	Northern Transvaal	Newlands Stadium, Cape Town
		Report

== See also ==
- 1989 Currie Cup Division A
- 1989 Currie Cup Division B
- 1989 Santam Bank Trophy Division A
- 1989 Santam Bank Trophy Division B
