= 1988 Currie Cup Division B =

49th season of the second division of the Rugby competition

- Countries: South Africa
- Date: 30 April – 10 September 1988
- Champions: Northern Free State
- Runners-up: Western Transvaal
- Promoted: Northern Free State
- Relegated: None
- Matches played: 31

The 1988 Currie Cup Division B (known as the Santam Bank Currie Cup for sponsorship reasons) was the second division of the Currie Cup competition, the 49th season in the since it started in 1889.

== Teams ==
Location of teams in 1988 Currie Cup Division B

1988 Currie Cup Division B
Eastern Free State
Eastern Transvaal
Griqualand West
Northern Free State
Vaal Triangle
Western Transvaal

== Competition ==
=== Regular season and title play-offs ===
There were six participating teams in the 1988 Currie Cup Division B. These teams played each other twice over the course of the season, once at home and once away. Teams received two points for a win and one point for a draw. The top two teams qualified for the Division B finals, played at the home venue of the higher-placed team.

The winner of the final also qualified for the 1988 Currie Cup Semi-Final.

=== Promotion play-offs ===
The top team on the log qualified for the promotion play-offs. That team played off against the team placed seventh in Division A over two legs. The winner over these two ties qualified for the 1989 Currie Cup Division A, while the losing team qualified for the 1989 Currie Cup Division B.

=== Relegation play-offs ===
The bottom team on the log qualified for the relegation play-offs. That team played off against the team that won the Santam Bank Trophy Division A over two legs. The winner over these two ties qualified for the 1989 Currie Cup Division B, while the losing team qualified for the 1989 Santam Bank Trophy Division A.

== Log ==
1988 Currie Cup Division B log
Pos	Team	Pld	W	D	L	PF	PA	PD	TF	TA	Pts	Qualification
1	Northern Free State	10	8	1	1	265	125	+140	30	8	17	Currie Cup semi-finals Division B final
2	Western Transvaal	10	7	1	2	375	135	+240	55	14	15	Division B final
3	Griqualand West	10	7	0	3	187	128	+59	24	9	14	
4	Vaal Triangle	10	5	0	5	176	120	+56	18	9	10	
5	Eastern Transvaal	10	2	0	8	181	242	−61	21	29	4	
6	Eastern Free State	10	0	0	10	79	513	−434	3	82	0	Relegation play-off

Rules for classification: 2 points for a win, 1 point for a draw

== Fixtures and Results ==
=== Round One ===
30 April 1988	Eastern Free State	12–30	Vaal Triangle	Bethlehem

30 April 1988	Griqualand West	31–13	Eastern Transvaal	Kimberley

30 April 1988	Northern Free State	24–24	Western Transvaal	Welkom

=== Round Two ===
5 May 1988	Vaal Triangle	9–12	Northern Free State	Sasolburg

7 May 1988	Eastern Transvaal	36–9	Eastern Free State	Springs

Bye/s: Griqualand West, Western Transvaal

=== Round Three ===
14 May 1988	Eastern Free State	9–19	Griqualand West	Bethlehem

14 May 1988	Northern Free State	18–13	Eastern Transvaal	Welkom

14 May 1988	Western Transvaal	20–9	Vaal Triangle	Potchefstroom

=== Round Four ===
21 May 1988	Griqualand West	19–12	Northern Free State	Kimberley

21 May 1988	Eastern Transvaal	27–32	Western Transvaal	Springs

Bye/s: Eastern Free State, Vaal Triangle

=== Round Five ===
31 May 1988	Northern Free State	74–6	Eastern Free State	Welkom

4 June 1988	Western Transvaal	12–18	Griqualand West	Potchefstroom

4 June 1988	Vaal Triangle	21–0	Eastern Transvaal	Sasolburg

=== Round Six ===
11 June 1988	Eastern Free State	10–68	Western Transvaal	Bethlehem

11 June 1988	Griqualand West	6–3	Vaal Triangle	Kimberley

Bye/s: Eastern Transvaal, Northern Free State

=== Round Seven ===
2 July 1988	Eastern Transvaal	12–19	Griqualand West	Springs

2 July 1988	Vaal Triangle	51–0	Eastern Free State	Sasolburg

2 July 1988	Western Transvaal	6–15	Northern Free State	Potchefstroom

=== Round Eight ===
23 July 1988	Eastern Free State	6–43	Eastern Transvaal	Bethlehem

23 July 1988	Northern Free State	22–12	Vaal Triangle	Welkom

Bye/s: Griqualand West, Western Transvaal

=== Round Nine ===
6 August 1988	Eastern Transvaal	15–28	Northern Free State	Springs

6 August 1988	Griqualand West	44–9	Eastern Free State	Kimberley

6 August 1988	Vaal Triangle	9–21	Western Transvaal	Sasolburg

=== Round Ten ===
20 August 1988	Northern Free State	15–12	Griqualand West	Welkom

20 August 1988	Western Transvaal	59–4	Eastern Transvaal	Potchefstroom

Bye/s: Eastern Free State, Vaal Triangle

=== Round Eleven ===
26 August 1988	Eastern Transvaal	18–19	Vaal Triangle	Kempton Park

27 August 1988	Griqualand West	10–30	Western Transvaal	Kimberley

27 August 1988	Eastern Free State	9 –45	Northern Free State	Bethlehem

=== Round Twelve ===
3 September 1988	Western Transvaal	103–9	Eastern Free State	Potchefstroom

3 September 1988	Vaal Triangle	13–9	Griqualand West	Sasolburg

Bye/s: Eastern Transvaal, Northern Free State

=== Final ===
10 September 1988	Northern Free State	46–9	Western Transvaal	North West Stadium, Welkom
		Report

== Currie Cup Semi-Final ==
As champions of Division B, Northern Free State qualified to the semi-finals of the main Currie Cup competition, where they met Division A runners-up Western Province.

17 September 1988	Northern Free State	9–26	Western Province	North West Stadium, Welkom
		Report

== Promotion/relegation play-offs ==
=== Promotion play-offs ===
In the promotion play-offs, Northern Free State beat Free State on aggregate and won promotion to Division A. Free State were initially relegated, but Division A was expanded to 8 teams and they retained their place.

24 September 1988	Free State	14–40	Northern Free State	Free State Stadium, Bloemfontein
		Report

8 October 1988	Northern Free State	v	Free State	North West Stadium, Welkom
		Report

=== Relegation play-offs ===
In the relegation play-offs, South Eastern Transvaal beat Eastern Free State on aggregate and won promotion to the 1989 Currie Cup Division B. Eastern Free State were initially relegated to the 1989 Santam Bank Trophy Division A, but due to the Currie Cup Division A's subsequent expansion to 8 teams, they retained their place.

17 September 1988	Eastern Free State	15–21	South Eastern Transvaal	Bethleham
		Report

24 September 1988	South Eastern Transvaal	39–12	Eastern Free State	Witbank
		Report

== See also ==
- 1988 Currie Cup Division A
- 1988 Lion Cup
- 1988 Santam Bank Trophy Division A
- 1988 Santam Bank Trophy Division B
