= 1988 Lion Cup =

Rugby union competition in South Africa

- Countries: South Africa
- Date: 26 March – 30 July 1988
- Champions: Western Province (2nd title)
- Runners-up: Northern Transvaal
- Matches played: 25

The 1989 Lion Cup was the premier domestic rugby union knock-out competition in South Africa. This was the sixth edition of the Lion Cup.

== Teams ==
All 26 South African provincial teams took part in this competition. They were ranked as follows:

1988 Lion Cup teams
Ranking	Team
1	Transvaal
2	Northern Transvaal
3	Western Province
4	Free State
5	Eastern Province
6	Northern Free State
7	Far North
8	Boland
9	Western Province League
10	South Western Districts
11	Vaal Triangle
12	Western Transvaal
13	Northern Natal
14	South West Africa
15	North Eastern Cape
16	Natal
17	Eastern Free State
18	Border
19	North Western Cape
20	Stellaland
21	Eastern Transvaal
22	South Eastern Transvaal
23	Griqualand West
24	Lowveld
25	SARU
26	Winelands

== Competition ==
This competition was a knock-out competition. The four teams ranked 23 to 26 played each other in the qualifying round with the two winners advancing to Round One, where they joined the teams ranked 9 to 22. These 16 teams played in eight matches, with the winners advancing to Round Two, where the top 8 ranked teams will join. In Round Two, the 16 remaining teams would be reduced to eight and would be followed by the quarter-finals, semi-finals and the Final.

== Fixtures and results ==
The draw for round one and round two were made on 25 February, The quarter final draw was made on 3 May and the semi-final draw on 28 May.

=== Qualifying round ===
12 March 1988	SARU	19–24	Lowveld	Port Elizabeth
		Report

19 March 1988	Winelands	15–38	Griqualand West	Kimberley
		Report

=== Round one ===
26 March 1988	Border	10–16	Vaal Triangle
		Report

26 March 1988	Eastern Free State	12–55	Natal	Bethlehem
		Report

26 March 1988	Eastern Transvaal	15–7	North Eastern Cape
		Report

26 March 1988	Griqualand West	10–13	South West Africa	Kimberley
		Report

26 March 1988	Lowveld	31–24	Northern Natal
		Report

26 March 1988	North Western Cape	15–25	South Western Districts	Upington
		Report

26 March 1988	South Eastern Transvaal	18–3	Western Province League	Witbank
		Report

26 March 1988	Stellaland	9–49	Western Transvaal	Lichtenburg
		Report

Bye/s: Boland, Eastern Province, Far North, Free State, Northern Free State, Northern Transvaal, Transvaal, Western Province

=== Round two ===
23 April 1988	Eastern Transvaal	15–49	Northern Transvaal	Spring
		Report

23 April 1988	Lowveld	12–24	Far North	Nelspruit
		Report

23 April 1988	Natal	29–16	Free State	Durban
		Report

23 April 1988	South Eastern Transvaal	12–37	Transvaal	Witbank
		Report

23 April 1988	South West Africa	21–24	Western Province	Windhoek

23 April 1988	South Western Districts	15–20	Boland	Riversdale
		Report

23 April 1988	Vaal Triangle	9–12	Northern Free State	Sasolburg
		Report

23 April 1988	Western Transvaal	33–13	Eastern Province	Potchefstroom
		Report

=== Quarter-finals ===
28 May 1988	Far North	13–19	Northern Transvaal	Pietersburg
		Report

28 May 1988	Natal	17–13	Transvaal	Durban
		Report

28 May 1988	Western Province	40–12	Boland	Newlands Stadium, Cape Town
		Report

28 May 1988	Western Transvaal	18–15	Northern Free State	Potchefstroom
		Report

=== Semi-finals ===
9 July 1988	Northern Transvaal	50–0	Natal	Loftus Versfeld, Pretoria
		Report

9 July 1988	Western Province	54–3	Western Transvaal	Newlands Stadium, Cape Town
		Report

=== Final ===
30 July 1988	Northern Transvaal	12–24	Western Province	Loftus Versfeld, Pretoria
		Report

== See also ==
- 1988 Currie Cup Division A
- 1988 Currie Cup Division B
- 1988 Santam Bank Trophy Division A
- 1988 Santam Bank Trophy Division B
