= 1988 Northern Transvaal Currie Cup season =

Rugby union competition season

1988 Currie Cup Division A
- Countries: South Africa, Namibia
- Date: 30 April – 1 October 1988
- Champions: Northern Transvaal (15th title)
- Runners-up: Western Province

The Northern Transvaal rugby union team competed in the 1988 Currie Cup tournament in South Africa. They defeated Western Province with a score of 19-18 in the final.

== Northern Transvaal results in the 1988 Currie cup ==
1988 Northern Transvaal results
game №	Northern Transvaal points	Opponent points	Opponent	date	Venue	Result	Match notes
1	6	24	Western Province	7 May 1988	Pretoria	Northern Transvaal Lost	
2	34	15	South West Africa	14 May 1988	Windhoek, Namibia	Northern Transvaal won	
3	22	18	Transvaal	21 May 1988	Pretoria	Northern Transvaal won	
4	30	18	Eastern Province	4 June 1988	Port Elizabeth	Northern Transvaal won	
5	48	18	Free State	11 June 1988	Pretoria	Northern Transvaal won	
6	34	27	Natal	18 June 1988	Durban	Northern Transvaal won	
7	24	15	Western Province	2 July 1988	Cape Town	Northern Transvaal won	
8	18	16	South West Africa	23 July 1988	Pretoria	Northern Transvaal won	
9	21	10	Transvaal	6 August 1988	Johannesburg	Northern Transvaal won	
10	49	9	Eastern Province	20 August 1988	Pretoria	Northern Transvaal won	
11	18	12	Free State	27 August 1988	Bloemfontein	Northern Transvaal won	
12	24	6	Natal	3 September 1988	Pretoria	Northern Transvaal won	
13	19	18	Western Province	1 October 1988	Loftus Versfeld, Pretoria	Northern Transvaal won	1988 Currie Cup final

== Statistics ==
=== 1988 Currie cup log position ===
1988 Currie Cup Division A log
Pos	Team	Pld	W	D	L	PF	PA	PD	TF	TA	Pts
1	Northern Transvaal	14	14	0	0	530	195	+335	71	17	28

=== 1988 - 1988 results summary (including play off matches) ===
Period	Games	Won	Drawn	Lost	Win %	Points for	Average PF	Points against	40-49 pts	50-99 pts	100+ pts	Best score	Worst score against
1988–1988	13	12	0	1	92.31%	347	26.69	206	2	0	0	49-9 vs Eastern province (1988)	27–34 vs Natal (1988)
