= 1989 Northern Transvaal Currie Cup season =

Rugby union competition season

1989 Currie Cup Division A
- Countries: South Africa, Namibia
- Date: 28 April – 7 October 1989
- Champions: Northern Transvaal (16th title) / Western Province (29th title)

The Northern Transvaal rugby union team competed in the 1989 Currie Cup tournament in South Africa. They tied with Western Province with 16-all in the final.

== Northern Transvaal results in the 1989 Currie cup ==
1989 Northern Transvaal results
game №	Northern Transvaal points	Opponent points	Opponent	date	Venue	Result	Match notes
1	27	18	Northern Free State	29 April 1989	Pretoria	Northern Transvaal won	
2	30	18	Western Province	6 May 1989	Cape Town	Northern Transvaal won	
3	55	13	South West Africa	13 May 1989	Pretoria	Northern Transvaal won	
4	46	15	Transvaal	20 May 1989	Johannesburg	Northern Transvaal won	
5	50	6	Eastern Province	3 June 1989	Pretoria	Northern Transvaal won	
6	24	16	Free State	10 June 1989	Bloemfontein	Northern Transvaal won	
7	58	15	Natal	17 June 1989	Pretoria	Northern Transvaal won	
8	24	9	Western Province	15 July 1989	Pretoria	Northern Transvaal won	
9	71	3	South West Africa	5 August 1989	Windhoek, Namibia	Northern Transvaal won	
10	38	24	Transvaal	12 August 1989	Pretoria	Northern Transvaal won	
11	27	12	Eastern Province	19 August 1989	Port Elizabeth	Northern Transvaal won	
12	29	24	Free State	9 September 1989	Pretoria	Northern Transvaal won	
13	18	13	Natal	16 September 1989	Durban	Northern Transvaal won	
14	33	9	Northern Free State	23 September 1989	Welkom	Northern Transvaal won	
15	16	16	Western province	7 October 1989	Cape Town	Drawn match	1989 Currie Cup final.

== Statistics ==
=== 1989 Currie cup log position ===
1989 Currie Cup Division A Log
Pos	Team	Pl	W	D	L	PF	PA	PD	TF	TA	Pts
1st	Northern Transvaal	14	14	0	0	530	195	+335	71	17	28

=== 1988 - 1989 results summary (including play off matches) ===
Period	Games	Won	Drawn	Lost	Win %	Points for	Average PF	Points against	40-49 pts	50-99 pts	100+ pts	Best score	Worst score against
1988–1989	28	26	1	1	92.86%	893	31.89	417	3	4	0	71-3 vs South West Africa (1989)	27–34 vs Natal (1988)
