= 2017 Under-20 Provincial Championship =

- Countries: South Africa
- Date: 3 June – 20 October 2017
- Champions: Griffons U20
- Runners-up: Limpopo Blue Bulls U20
- Matches played: 59
- Tries scored: 563 (average 9.5 per match)
- Top point scorer: Luan James (Griffons U20, 208)
- Top try scorer: Barry Adonis (Boland U20) and Jaywin Petersen (SWD U20, 13)

The 2017 Under-20 Provincial Championship was the 2017 edition of the Under-20 Provincial Championship, an annual national Under-20 rugby union competition held in South Africa, and was contested from 3 June to 20 October 2017.

The competition was won by Griffons U20, who beat Limpopo Blue Bulls U20 29–22 in the final played on 20 October 2017.

== Competition rules and information ==
There were eight participating teams in the 2017 Under-20 Provincial Championship. They played each other twice during the pool stage, once at home and once away. Teams received four points for a win and two points for a draw. Bonus points were awarded to teams that scored four or more tries in a game, as well as to teams that lost a match by seven points or less. Teams were ranked by log points, then points difference (points scored less points conceded).

The top four teams in the pool stage qualified for the semifinals, which were followed by a final.

== Teams ==
The teams that played in the 2017 Under-20 Provincial Championship were:

Location of teams in the 2017 Under-20 Provincial Championship

2017 Under-20 Provincial Championship teams
Team name	Stadium
Boland U20	Boland Stadium, Wellington
Border U20	Buffalo City Stadium, East London
Falcons U20	Barnard Stadium, Kempton Park
Griffons U20	North West Stadium, Welkom
Griquas U20	Griqua Park, Kimberley
Limpopo Blue Bulls U20	Peter Mokaba Stadium, Polokwane
Pumas U20	Mbombela Stadium, Mbombela
SWD U20	Outeniqua Park, George

== Pool stage ==
=== Standings ===
2017 Under-20 Provincial Championship log
Pos	Team	P	W	D	L	PF	PA	PD	TF	TA	TB	LB	Pts
1	Griffons U20	14	12	0	2	657	340	+317	93	42	13	1	62
2	SWD U20	14	10	1	3	545	438	+107	83	64	12	0	54
3	Limpopo Blue Bulls U20	14	9	0	5	454	387	+67	59	55	10	1	47
4	Boland U20	14	9	0	5	517	474	+43	73	64	10	0	46
5	Falcons U20	14	5	1	8	490	363	+127	76	47	12	6	40
6	Griquas U20	14	5	1	8	428	520	−92	62	74	10	2	34
7	Pumas U20	14	3	1	10	439	615	−176	58	92	8	2	24
8	Border U20	14	1	0	13	235	628	−393	32	98	2	2	8
Final standings.

Legend and competition rules
Legend:
Qualified for the semifinals.	P = Games played, W = Games won, D = Games drawn, L = Games lost, PF = Points for, PA = Points against, PD = Points difference, TF = Tries for, TA = Tries against, TB = Try bonus points, LB = Losing bonus points, Pts = Log points
Competition rules:
Qualification: The top four teams qualified for the semifinals. Points breakdown: * 4 points for a win * 2 points for a draw * 1 bonus point for a loss by seven points or less * 1 bonus point for scoring four or more tries in a match

=== Matches ===
==== Round one ====
3 June 2017	Boland U20	31–67	Griffons U20	Boland Stadium, Wellington
12:00	Try: Zinzan Visser (2); Mihle Nelani (2); Gilroy Philander; Con: Andre Swanepoel; Jaydon Markus (2)	Scoreboard	Try: Fanie Vermaak; Gideon van Eeden; Jean Pierre Alberts; Reginald Alexander; Brandon Swart (2); Mickyle Snyders (2); Granwill Matthys (2); Con: Luan James (7); Pen: Luan James	Referee: Jaco Pretorius

3 June 2017	Pumas U20	45–45	Falcons U20	Hoërskool Middelburg, Middelburg
15:00	Try: Klaus-Andre Cellar; Jakes Louwrens Britz; Ryan Phiri; Stephanus Jan Esterhuyse; Japie Kleinhans; Con: Jaundre Nel (4); Pen: Jaundre Nel (4)	Scoreboard	Try: Ruan Vermeulen; Heino Keyser; Gavin Pienaar (2); Mark Jordaan; Lian Smit (2); Con: Heino Keyser (3); Gavin Pienaar (2)	Referee: Pieter Maritz

3 June 2017	Limpopo Blue Bulls U20	25–34	Border U20	LC de Villiers Stadium, Pretoria
15:00	Try: Chrizaan Strauss; Kopano Senne; Danny Mokhoabane (2); Con: Chrizaan Strauss; Pen: Chrizaan Strauss	Scoreboard	Try: T-Bose Magaza; LK Komani (3); Buvo Bovu; Con: Busani Hini (3); Pen: Busani Hini	Referee: Stephan Geldenhuys

Bye/s: Griquas U20, SWD U20

==== Round two ====
9 June 2017	Falcons U20	38–5	Griquas U20	Barnard Stadium, Kempton Park
12:30	Try: Andrew Theunissen; Echard van der Westhuizen; Kirshen Aploon; Hardus Pretorius; Jeandre Esterhuizen; Gift Gomede; Con: Gavin Pienaar (4)	Scoreboard	Try: Lohan Zeelie	Referee: Ben Crouse

10 June 2017	SWD U20	27–57	Griffons U20	Outeniqua Park, George
11:00	Try: Jaywin Petersen; Michael Fernol; Thakga Boloko; Tristan Fourie; Stiaan Grobler; Con: Ronaldo Fortuin	Scoreboard	Try: Gideon van Eeden; Granwill Matthys (2); Jean Pierre Alberts; Jason Olivier (3); Brandon Swart; Balo Mteyise; Con: Luan James (6)	Referee: Ricus van der Hoven

10 June 2017	Border U20	7–42	Pumas U20	Police Park, East London
14:00	Try: Esto Nasiphi; Con: Xolisa Maxhegwana	Scoreboard	Try: Christiaan Theunis Gertze Botha (2); Justin-Ray Meyer; Shaun Micheal Jacobs; Japie Kleinhans (2); Con: Stephanus Jan Esterhuyse (3); Pen: Jaundre Nel; Stephanus Jan Esterhuyse	Referee: Vusi Msibi

Bye/s: Boland U20, Limpopo Blue Bulls U20

==== Round three ====
15 June 2017	Griquas U20	55–15	Border U20	Tafel Lager Park, Kimberley
16:30	Try: Hendrik Abraham Venter; Heinrich Fourie; Andre Kruger (2); Pieter Snyman; Jacques Beukes (2); Jeandre Lukas; Christopher Rolomana; Con: Jacques Beukes (4); Jeandre Lukas	Scoreboard	Try: Dudley James Brown; LK Komani; Con: Xolisa Maxhegwana; Pen: Dilolo Mapuko	Referee: Mpho Matsaung

16 June 2017	SWD U20	55–15	Boland U20	Outeniqua Park, George
14:00	Try: Stiaan Grobler; Justin Levendal; Tristan Fourie; Jaywin Petersen (2); Reinhardt Stears; Michael Fernol penalty try Con: Tristan Fourie (5); Pen: Tristan Fourie	Scoreboard	Try: Barry Adonis; Gilroy Philander; Con: Jaydon Markus; Pen: Jaydon Markus	Referee: Ruhan Meiring

17 June 2017	Limpopo Blue Bulls U20	26–20	Griffons U20	Loftus Versfeld, Pretoria
15:00	Try: Mauritz Pretorius; Pule Molokomme; Con: Chrizaan Strauss (2); Pen: Chrizaan Strauss (4)	Scoreboard	Try: Jerome Lottering; Mickyle Snyders; Con: Jason Olivier (2); Pen: Jason Olivier (2)	Referee: Oregopotse Rametsi

Bye/s: Falcons U20, Pumas U20

==== Round four ====
23 June 2017	Boland U20	25–20	Limpopo Blue Bulls U20	Boland Stadium, Wellington
15:00	Try: Bronlee Mouries; Barry Adonis (2); Con: Marlin Baron; Chantin Jonas; Pen: Andre Swanepoel (2)	Scoreboard	Try: Luke Haynes; Lee Jordaan; Pule Molokomme; Con: Chrizaan Strauss; Pen: Chrizaan Strauss	Referee: Aimee Barrett-Theron

24 June 2017	Border U20	7–29	Falcons U20	Buffalo City Stadium, East London
13:30	Try: Sinovuyo Bali; Con: Buvo Bovu	Scoreboard	Try: Lombaard Joubert; Ethan Jantjies; Brandon Collins (2); Con: Gavin Pienaar (3); Pen: Gavin Pienaar	Referee: Archie Sehlako

24 June 2017	Griffons U20	58–22	Pumas U20	HT Pelatona Projects Stadium, Welkom
14:35	Try: Michiel Bosman; Luan James; Wian van Staden; Luciano Eduardo Jones (2); Brandon Swart; Balo Mteyise; Granwill Matthys; Con: Luan James (6); Pen: Luan James (2)	Scoreboard	Try: Xander Kriel; Con: Jaundre Nel; Pen: Jaundre Nel (5)	Referee: Stephan Geldenhuys

Bye/s: Griquas U20, SWD U20

==== Round five ====
1 July 2017	Griquas U20	38–41	Griffons U20	Tafel Lager Park, Kimberley
12:30	Try: Lohan Zeelie; JP Roets; Jeandre Lukas; Pieter Snyman; Con: Pieter Snyman (3); Pen: Pieter Snyman (4)	Scoreboard	Try: Hardus van Heerden; Mickyle Snyders; Brandon Swart (3); Granwill Matthys; Con: Luan James (4); Pen: Luan James	Referee: Lourens van der Merwe

1 July 2017	Pumas U20	39–43	Boland U20	Hoërskool Middelburg, Middelburg
15:00	Try: Esuan van Niekerk; Barend Frederik Hendriks; Johannes Hendrik Maree; Ryan Cloete; Jean-Pe Ferreira; Con: Jaundre Nel; Gert Cronje (3); Pen: Jaundre Nel; Gert Cronje	Scoreboard	Try: Wernich Harms; Barry Adonis (2); Xavier Mitchell; Jodi Koul (2); Con: Andre Swanepoel (4); Marlin Baron; Pen: Andre Swanepoel	Referee: Ben Crouse

1 July 2017	Limpopo Blue Bulls U20	29–43	SWD U20	Loftus Versfeld, Pretoria
16:00	Try: Reynhard Fourie (2); Pule Molokomme; Joseph Josephus Anker; Con: Chrizaan Strauss (2); Henry Nell; Pen: Chrizaan Strauss	Scoreboard	Try: Aiden Joseph; Ronaldo Jansen; Lithemba Mpoli (2); Kuite du Preez (2); Cecil Rittels; Con: Tristan Fourie (4)	Referee: Pieter Maritz

Bye/s: Border U20, Falcons U20

==== Round six ====
7 July 2017	Boland U20	78–7	Griquas U20	Boland Stadium, Wellington
14:00	Try: Peter Smit (2); Christiaan Smit; Barry Adonis (3); Mihle Nelani; Xavier Mitchell (2); Chantin Jonas; Jaiden Baron (2); Con: Andre Swanepoel (5); Marlin Baron (4)	Scoreboard	Try: Nathan Nienaber; Con: Glen Nieuwoudt	Referee: Vusi Msibi

8 July 2017	SWD U20	52–28	Pumas U20	Outeniqua Park, George
14:00	Try: Adriaan-Lee du Preez; Justin Levendal; Jaywin Petersen (2); Michael Fernol (2); Lithemba Mpoli; Damon Sinuka; Con: Tristan Fourie (6)	Scoreboard	Try: Klaus-Andre Cellar; Johannes Hendrik Maree; Marco Grobler; Xander Kriel; Con: Gert Cronje (4)	Referee: Aimee Barrett-Theron

8 July 2017	Griffons U20	26–15	Falcons U20	HT Pelatona Projects Stadium, Welkom
15:00	Try: Duke Jantjies; Luan James; Brandon Swart; Balo Mteyise; Pen: Luan James (2)	Scoreboard	Try: Reece Bocks; Hardus Pretorius; Con: Gavin Pienaar; Pen: Gavin Pienaar	Referee: Paul Mente

Bye/s: Border U20, Limpopo Blue Bulls U20

==== Round seven ====
14 July 2017	Limpopo Blue Bulls U20	48–14	Pumas U20	Loftus Versfeld B, Pretoria
15:00	Try: Jeandre Jones; Reynhard Fourie; Ettienn Slabbert; Mauritz Pretorius; Jonathan Rabie (2); Con: Henry Nell (2); Chrizaan Strauss; Pen: Henry Nell (4)	Scoreboard	Try: Xander Kriel; Stephanus Jan Esterhuyse; Con: Jaundre Nel (2)	Referee: Paul Mente

15 July 2017	Falcons U20	26–27	Boland U20	Barnard Stadium, Kempton Park
12:30	Try: Keanan Alexander; Byron Nysschen; Gavin Pienaar; Ruan Janse van Rensburg; Con: Gavin Pienaar (3)	Scoreboard	Try: Xavier Mitchell (2); Jaydon Markus; Con: Andre Swanepoel; Chantin Jonas (2); Pen: Andre Swanepoel (2)	Referee: Lourens van der Merwe

15 July 2017	Griquas U20	36–36	SWD U20	Tafel Lager Park, Kimberley
14:00	Try: Taliesen Dick; Pieter Snyman; Ruan Smit (2); Whaydon Hedwin Floors penalty try Con: Nathan Nienaber; Ruan Botha	Scoreboard	Try: Reinhardt Stears; Michael Fernol (2); Ronaldo Jansen; Ronaldo Fortuin; Con: Michael Fernol (4); Pen: Michael Fernol	Referee: Stephan Geldenhuys

15 July 2017	Border U20	3–46	Griffons U20	Buffalo City Stadium, East London
14:00	Pen: Xolisa Maxhegwana	Scoreboard	Try: Jean Pierre Alberts; Tristan Rothman; Jason Olivier; Luan James; Michael Mamabolo; Brandon Swart; Allistair Mumba; Michiel Bosman; Con: Luan James (3)	Referee: Ruhan Meiring

==== Round eight ====
21 July 2017	Limpopo Blue Bulls U20	37–29	Griquas U20	Loftus Versfeld, Pretoria
13:00	Try: Luke Haynes; Mauritz Pretorius; Du Preez van der Merwe; Jonathan Rabie; Con: Chrizaan Strauss (2); Danny Mokhoabane (2); Pen: Chrizaan Strauss; Danny Mokhoabane (2)	Scoreboard	Try: Willem Barnard Fourie (2); Jeandre Lukas; Chix Griqua; Con: Pieter Snyman (3); Pen: Pieter Snyman	Referee: Ricus van der Hoven

21 July 2017	Boland U20	32–17	Border U20	Boland Stadium, Wellington
14:00	Try: Peter Smit; Barry Adonis; Byron Qupa; Jaydon Markus; Andre Swanepoel; Con: Andre Swanepoel (2); Pen: Andre Swanepoel	Scoreboard	Try: Libongo Yapi; Luciano Douglas; Con: Dilolo Mapuko (2); Pen: Dilolo Mapuko	Referee: Rodney Boneparte

21 July 2017	SWD U20	29–27	Falcons U20	Outeniqua Park, George
15:30	Try: Joseph Peter Rooyakkers; Jaywin Petersen; Ronaldo Jansen; Thakga Boloko; Con: Tristan Fourie (3); Pen: Tristan Fourie	Scoreboard	Try: Byron Nysschen; Reece Bocks; Gavin Pienaar; Dylan Stiemmie; Keaton Gordon; Con: Joshua Petro	Referee: Archie Sehlako

Bye/s: Griffons U20, Pumas U20

==== Round nine ====
28 July 2017	Falcons U20	41–42	Limpopo Blue Bulls U20	Barnard Stadium, Kempton Park
14:00	Try: Reece Bocks; Brandon Collins (3); Dylan Stiemmie; Gavin Pienaar; Sherwyn Prins; Con: Joshua Petro; Nico Colyn (2)	Scoreboard	Try: Jeandre Jones; Luke Haynes; Ettienn Slabbert; Jonathan Rabie (2); Con: Jordan Smalley (4); Pen: Jordan Smalley; John Robert Smith (2)	Referee: Mpho Matsaung

29 July 2017	Griquas U20	55–14	Pumas U20	Tafel Lager Park, Kimberley
14:00	Try: Ruan Smit (3); JP Roets; Gerhardus Potgieter; Jacques Beukes (2); Danillo Huyster; Christopher Rolomana; Con: Gerhardus Potgieter (3); Pieter Snyman (2)	Scoreboard	Try: Klaus-Andre Cellar; Stephanus Jan Esterhuyse; Con: Gert Cronje (2)	Referee: Jaco Kotze

29 July 2017	Border U20	33–36	SWD U20	Buffalo City Stadium, East London
14:00	Try: T-Bose Magaza; Dudley James Brown (2); Dilolo Mapuko; Rasta Mfengu; Con: Xolisa Maxhegwana; Pen: Xolisa Maxhegwana (2)	Scoreboard	Try: Reinhardt Stears; Justin Levendal; Jaywin Petersen (2); Lithemba Mpoli; Carolus Johannes van Niekerk; Con: Willtanio Seconds (2); Bradley Marthinus	Referee: Paul Mente

Bye/s: Boland U20, Griffons U20

==== Round ten ====
5 August 2017	Falcons U20	54–14	Pumas U20	Barnard Stadium, Kempton Park
11:00	Try: Ruan Janse van Rensburg; Ruan Vermeulen; Andrew Volschenk; Brandon Collins; Gavin Pienaar (2); Jeandre Esterhuizen; Joshua Petro; Con: Gavin Pienaar (7)	Scoreboard	Try: Gerhard Combrink; Esuan van Niekerk; Con: Gert Cronje (2)	Referee: Stephan Geldenhuys

5 August 2017	Border U20	23–34	Limpopo Blue Bulls U20	Buffalo City Stadium, East London
14:00	Try: Izzy Kori; Ayabonga Phelani (2); Con: Xolisa Maxhegwana; Pen: Xolisa Maxhegwana (2)	Scoreboard	Try: Xandre Miller; Christoff Mulder; Luke Haynes; Michael Jacobs; Joseph Josephus Anker; Con: John Robert Smith; Michael Jacobs (2); Pen: John Robert Smith	Referee: Sindile Ngcese

5 August 2017	Griffons U20	41–29	Boland U20	HT Pelatona Projects Stadium, Welkom
16:00	Try: Fanie Vermaak; Tristan Rothman; Allistair Mumba penalty try Con: Luan James (2); Pen: Luan James (4); Drop: Luan James	Scoreboard	Try: Mihle Nelani; Jannes van Niekerk; Kevin Goddard; Andre Swanepoel; Con: Marlin Baron; Andre Swanepoel (2); Pen: Marlin Baron	Referee: Jaco Pretorius

Bye/s: Griquas U20, SWD U20

==== Round eleven ====
12 August 2017	Griquas U20	28–27	Falcons U20	Tafel Lager Park, Kimberley
14:00	Try: SW van Zyl; Ruan Smit; Lohan Zeelie; LW Viljoen; Con: Gerhardus Potgieter (2); Pieter Snyman; Joe-Lythen Willemse	Scoreboard	Try: Dian de Beer; Gavin Pienaar (2); Sherwyn Prins; Con: Gavin Pienaar (2); Pen: Gavin Pienaar	Referee: Jaco Kotze

12 August 2017	Pumas U20	54–3	Border U20	Hoërskool Middelburg, Middelburg
15:00	Try: Jaundre Nel; Shaun Micheal Jacobs (2); Stephanus Jan Esterhuyse; Stefan Magro; Gert Cronje (2); Ernest Nkosinathi Mthethwa; Con: Jaundre Nel (3); Gert Cronje; Pen: Jaundre Nel; Gert Cronje	Scoreboard	Pen: Xolisa Maxhegwana	Referee: Oregopotse Rametsi

12 August 2017	Griffons U20	47–20	SWD U20	HT Pelatona Projects Stadium, Welkom
16:00	Try: Michiel Bosman; Tristan Rothman; Luan James; Granwill Matthys; Ulrich Stander penalty try Con: Luan James (3); Pen: Luan James (3)	Scoreboard	Try: Reinhardt Stears; John-Graham Botha; Con: Ronaldo Fortuin (2); Pen: Ronaldo Fortuin (2)	Referee: Lourens van der Merwe

Bye/s: Boland U20, Limpopo Blue Bulls U20

==== Round twelve ====
18 August 2017	Border U20	22–24	Griquas U20	Buffalo City Stadium, East London
15:00	Try: Buvo Bovu; Folau Novuka; Zuray Sili; Con: Dilolo Mapuko (2); Pen: Luciano Douglas	Scoreboard	Try: Christopher Rolomana; Jean Smal; Lovien Esterhuizen; Danillo Huyster; Con: Joe-Lythen Willemse (2)	Referee: Rodney Boneparte

19 August 2017	Boland U20	32–40	SWD U20	Boland Stadium, Wellington
14:00	Try: Phillip Jacobs; Barry Adonis; Gilroy Philander; Adrian Jackson; Con: Marlin Baron (3); Pen: Andre Swanepoel (2)	Scoreboard	Try: Reinhardt Stears; Denver Prins; Justin Levendal; Lithemba Mpoli; Ronaldo Fortuin; Austin Johnson; Con: Ronaldo Fortuin (4); Mikyle Roelfse	Referee: Archie Sehlako

19 August 2017	Griffons U20	40–31	Limpopo Blue Bulls U20	HT Pelatona Projects Stadium, Welkom
16:00	Try: Steven Pieterse; Tristan Rothman; Jason Olivier; Mickyle Snyders; Luciano Eduardo Jones; Con: Luan James (3); Pen: Luan James (2); Drop: Jason Olivier	Scoreboard	Try: Christoff Mulder (2); Lee Jordaan; Danny Mokhoabane; Con: Ethan Williams; Pen: Ethan Williams (3)	Referee: Jaco Kotze

Bye/s: Falcons U20, Pumas U20

==== Round thirteen ====
25 August 2017	Falcons U20	60–14	Border U20	Barnard Stadium, Kempton Park
15:00	Try: Dian de Beer; Lian Smit; Hardus Pretorius; Brandon Collins; Gift Gomede (2); Dylan Stiemmie (2); Reece Bocks; Jeandre Esterhuizen; Con: Gavin Pienaar; Joshua Petro (4)	Scoreboard	Try: Rasta Mfengu; Sinovuyo Bali; Con: Ayabonga Phelani (2)	Referee: Mpho Matsaung

25 August 2017	Pumas U20	10–79	Griffons U20	Mbombela Stadium, Mbombela
17:00	Try: Jean-Pe Ferreira; Con: Gert Cronje; Pen: Gert Cronje	Scoreboard	Try: Stephanus Malherbe; Johannes Hermanus van der Merwe; Jason Olivier (3); Allistair Mumba; Mickyle Snyders (2); Luciano Eduardo Jones; Granwill Matthys; Andrew Kota; Wian van Staden; Balo Mteyise; Con: Luan James (7)	Referee: Paul Mente

26 August 2017	Limpopo Blue Bulls U20	39–19	Boland U20	Loftus Versfeld B, Pretoria
14:00	Try: Christoff Mulder; Reynhard Fourie (2); Stefan Zerwick; Danny Mokhoabane; Con: Ethan Williams (4); Pen: Ethan Williams; Drop: Ethan Williams	Scoreboard	Try: Peter Smit; Jaiden Baron; Jaydon Markus; Con: Marlin Baron (2)	Referee: Oregopotse Rametsi

Bye/s: Griquas U20, SWD U20

==== Round fourteen ====
1 September 2017	SWD U20	31–11	Limpopo Blue Bulls U20	Outeniqua Park, George
15:30	Try: Aiden Joseph; Michael Fernol (2); Ronaldo Fortuin; Jaywin Petersen; Con: Ronaldo Fortuin (3)	Scoreboard	Try: Ruben Breedt; Pen: Michael Jacobs (2)	Referee: Rodney Boneparte

2 September 2017	Boland U20	35–21	Pumas U20	King Edward Stadium, Montagu
11:45	Try: Phillip Jacobs; Jaiden Baron (2); Xavier Mitchell; Gilroy Philander; Con: Jaydon Markus (5)	Scoreboard	Try: Stephanus Jan Esterhuyse (2); Ryan Phiri; Con: Gert Cronje (3)	Referee: Mpho Matsaung

2 September 2017	Griffons U20	46–24	Griquas U20	HT Pelatona Projects Stadium, Welkom
15:00	Try: Luciano Eduardo Jones (2); Allistair Mumba (3) penalty try Con: Luan James (4); Pen: Luan James (2)	Scoreboard	Try: Joe-Lythen Willemse; Jacques Beukes; Phurnal Grant Leigh Swartz; Con: LW Viljoen (3); Pen: LW Viljoen	Referee: Lourens van der Merwe

Bye/s: Border U20, Falcons U20

==== Round fifteen ====
8 September 2017	Pumas U20	39–57	SWD U20	Mbombela Stadium, Mbombela
15:00	Try: Johannes Hendrik Maree; Marco Grobler; Xander Kriel; Ryan Cloete; Gert Cronje; Con: Gert Cronje (4); Pen: Gert Cronje (2)	Scoreboard	Try: Willem Coetzee; Justin Levendal; Stiaan Grobler; Aiden Joseph (2); Maurice Brenwin Alexander; Michael Fernol; Lithemba Mpoli; Luvuyo Ndevu; Con: Ronaldo Fortuin (2); Tristan Fourie (4)	Referee: Pieter Maritz

8 September 2017	Griquas U20	43–47	Boland U20	Tafel Lager Park, Kimberley
16:45	Try: Cameron Hufke; LW Viljoen; Andre Kruger; Markus Mostert; Jason Pietersen; Con: Taliesen Dick (2); LW Viljoen; Pen: Taliesen Dick (4)	Scoreboard	Try: Wernich Harms; Taine Booysen; Jaiden Baron; Jodi Koul; Gilroy Philander; Chantin Jonas; Con: Chantin Jonas (4); Pen: Chantin Jonas; Drop: Jaydon Markus (2)	Referee: Stephan Geldenhuys

9 September 2017	Falcons U20	52–34	Griffons U20	Isak Steyl Stadium, Vanderbijlpark
15:00	Try: Hardus Pretorius; Brandon Collins; Gift Gomede (3); Martin Steyn (2); Con: Brandon Collins (7); Pen: Brandon Collins	Scoreboard	Try: Jason Olivier; Allistair Mumba; Granwill Matthys; Andrew Kota; Con: Luan James (4); Pen: Luan James (2)	Referee: Aimee Barrett-Theron

Bye/s: Border U20, Limpopo Blue Bulls U20

==== Round sixteen ====
15 September 2017	Boland U20	32–31	Falcons U20	Boland Stadium, Wellington
14:00	Try: Jaiden Baron; Barry Adonis; Gilroy Philander penalty try Con: Chantin Jonas (2); Pen: Chantin Jonas (2)	Scoreboard	Try: Dian de Beer; Brandon Collins (2); Gift Gomede penalty try Con: Brandon Collins (2)	Referee: Damian Schneider

15 September 2017	SWD U20	20–34	Griquas U20	Outeniqua Park, George
15:30	Try: Adriaan-Lee du Preez; Willem Coetzee; Maurice Brenwin Alexander; Con: Ronaldo Fortuin; Pen: Ronaldo Fortuin	Scoreboard	Try: Hendrik Abraham Venter; Ruan Smit; Nathan Nienaber (2); Danillo Huyster; Con: Chix Griqua (3); Pen: Chix Griqua	Referee: Sindile Ngcese

15 September 2017	Pumas U20	39–46	Limpopo Blue Bulls U20	Mbombela Stadium, Mbombela
17:00	Try: Jakes Louwrens Britz (2); Johannes Hendrik Maree; Ryan Cloete; Ernest Nkosinathi Mthethwa; Con: Gert Cronje (4); Pen: Gert Cronje; Michael Jacob de Lange	Scoreboard	Try: Carl Wijburg; Tiisetso Johannes Kekana; JJ Scheepers; Sergio Kasper; Henry Pike; Thomas Johannes Bedfort (2); Con: Ethan Williams (3); Danny Mokhoabane; Pen: Ethan Williams	Referee: Ricus van der Hoven

16 September 2017	Griffons U20	55–12	Border U20	HT Pelatona Projects Stadium, Welkom
15:00	Try: Fanie Vermaak; Jason Olivier; Mickyle Snyders (3); Brandon Swart; Ulrich Stander; Allistair Mumba; Con: Jason Olivier (2); Luan James (4); Drop: Luan James	Scoreboard	Try: T-Bose Magaza; Dilolo Mapuko; Con: LK Komani	Referee: Pieter Maritz

==== Round seventeen ====
23 September 2017	Falcons U20	33–35	SWD U20	Bosman Stadium, Brakpan
12:30	Try: Echard van der Westhuizen (2); Andrew Volschenk; Gift Gomede; Ruan Janse van Rensburg; Con: Brandon Collins (4)	Scoreboard	Try: Denver Prins; Aiden Joseph; Jaywin Petersen; Lithemba Mpoli (2); Con: Ronaldo Jansen (2); Pen: Dillon Kerspay; Ronaldo Jansen	Referee: Mpho Matsaung

23 September 2017	Border U20	28–72	Boland U20	Buffalo City Stadium, East London
13:00	Try: Dudley James Brown; Yamkela Mzozoyana; LK Komani; Con: LK Komani (2); Pen: LK Komani (2); Lee Man Ngcetane	Scoreboard	Try: Chantin Jonas; Mihle Nelani; Xavier Mitchell; Barry Adonis (2); Jaiden Baron (2); Taine Booysen; Bronlee Mouries; Jodi Koul (2); Con: Jaydon Markus (2); Andre Swanepoel (2); Jodi Koul (3); Pen: Jodi Koul	Referee: Paul Mente

23 September 2017	Griquas U20	17–41	Limpopo Blue Bulls U20	Tafel Lager Park, Kimberley
14:00	Try: Hendrik Abraham Venter; Nathan Nienaber; Con: Pieter Snyman (2); Pen: Pieter Snyman	Scoreboard	Try: Jeandre Jones; Luke Haynes (2); Sergio Kasper; Pule Molokomme; Kyle Theron; Con: Sergio Kasper (2); Henry Pike; Ethan Williams; Pen: Sergio Kasper	Referee: Jaco Kotze

Bye/s: Griffons U20, Pumas U20

==== Round eighteen ====
29 September 2017	SWD U20	64–17	Border U20	Outeniqua Park, George
15:30	Try: Reinhardt Stears; Justin Levendal; Luvuyo Ndevu; Adriaan-Lee du Preez; Dillon Kerspay; Willtanio Seconds; Jaywin Petersen; Damon Sinuka; Bradley Marthinus; Cecil Rittels; Con: Willtanio Seconds (4); Mikyle Roelfse (2); Cecil Rittels	Scoreboard	Try: Xolisa Maxhegwana; Rasta Mfengu; Folau Novuka; Con: Xolisa Maxhegwana	Referee: Aimee Barrett-Theron

30 September 2017	Pumas U20	58–33	Griquas U20	Sasol Recreation Club, Secunda
13:15	Try: Jakes Louwrens Britz; Jean-Pe Ferreira; Justin-Ray Meyer; Douglas Kyle Davidson; Gert Cronje; Stephanus Jan Esterhuyse; Ryan Cloete; Mathys Henrico Storm; Ernest Nkosinathi Mthethwa; Con: Gert Cronje (5); Pen: Gert Cronje	Scoreboard	Try: Chix Griqua; Nathan Nienaber; Jacques Beukes; Renier Venter; Nakedi Thoka; Con: Pieter Snyman (2); Ruan Botha (2)	Referee: Oregopotse Rametsi

30 September 2017	Limpopo Blue Bulls U20	25–12	Falcons U20	Loftus Versfeld B, Pretoria
14:00	Try: Sergio Kasper; Henry Pike; Carl Wijburg; Con: Ethan Williams (2); Pen: Ethan Williams (2)	Scoreboard	Try: Gavin Pienaar (2); Con: Gavin Pienaar	Referee: Rodney Boneparte

Bye/s: Boland U20, Griffons U20

== Title play-offs ==
=== Semifinals ===
13 October 2017	SWD U20	15–55	Limpopo Blue Bulls U20	Outeniqua Park, George
15:30	Try: Jaywin Petersen (2); Justin Levendal	Scoreboard	Try: Carl Wijburg (2); Pule Molokomme (3); Thomas Johannes Bedfort; Josefa Lalabalavu (2); Stefan Coetzee; Con: Ethan Williams; Henry Pike (4)	Referee: Paul Mente

14 October 2017	Griffons U20	42–15	Boland U20	HT Pelatona Projects Stadium, Welkom
13:30	Try: Duke Jantjies; Fanie Vermaak; Jean Pierre Alberts; Mickyle Snyders (2); Johannes Hermanus van der Merwe; Con: Jason Olivier; Luan James; Andrew Kota; Pen: Luan James; Drop: Luan James	Scoreboard	Try: Taine Booysen; Peter Smit; Chantin Jonas	Referee: Mpho Matsaung

=== Final ===
20 October 2017	Griffons U20	29–22	Limpopo Blue Bulls U20	HT Pelatona Projects Stadium, Welkom
13:30	Try: Allistair Mumba (2); Andrew Kota; Con: Luan James; Pen: Luan James (2); Drop: Luan James; Andrew Kota	Scoreboard	Try: Ethan Williams; Tiaan Coetzee; Stefan Coetzee; Con: Ethan Williams; Henry Pike; Pen: Henry Pike	Referee: Aimee Barrett-Theron

== Honours ==
The honour roll for the 2017 Under-20 Provincial Championship was as follows:

2017 Under-20 Provincial Championship
Champions:	Griffons U20
Top points scorer:	Luan James, Griffons U20 (208)
Top try scorer:	Barry Adonis, Boland U20 and Jaywin Petersen, SWD U20 (13)

== Players ==
The following squads were named for the 2017 Under-20 Provincial Championship:

Boland U20 squad
Barry Adonis • Jevon Anderson • Leighton Barends • Jaiden Baron • Marlin Baron • Taine Booysen • Johannes Bruwer • Jacobus Conradie • Jacobus Albertus du Plessis • Frederick Faul • Lyle Gillion • Kevin Goddard • Wernich Harms • Adrian Jackson • Godwin Jacobs • Phillip Jacobs • Chantin Jonas • Rick Jordaan • Coellin Julius • Jodi Koul • Liam Louw • Waughan Mackenzie • Jaydon Markus • Nashwell Marthinus • Xavier Mitchell • Bronlee Mouries • Jemiehl Muller • Mihle Nelani • William Owies • Gilroy Philander • Lee-Vern Pieters • JT Potgieter • Byron Qupa • Christiaan Radyn • Aphiwe Siwayi • Christiaan Smit • Peter Smit • Corneil Solomons • Andre Swanepoel • Jonick Talmakkies • Jannes van Niekerk • Dirk van Zyl • Zinzan Visser • Dewald Vrey

-
Sinovuyo Bali • Khakalethu Bophi • Buvo Bovu • Dudley James Brown • Khulekani Buthelezi • Darian Christians • Pops Christians • Luciano Douglas • Reinhardt Engelbrecht • Aussie Fredericks • Sonwabilo Gangqa • Jean Grieb • Soso Guzana • Luyolo Gwarube • Gwenxana Gwenxane • Busani Hini • Baphelele Janda • Geraldo Josephs • Tyson Kasper • Kamvelihle Kaweni • Reighardt Knoetze • LK Komani • Izzy Kori • T-Bose Magaza • Yamikani Majali • Buntu Manene • Dilolo Mapuko • Abongile Mashwabane • Xolisa Maxhegwana • Rasta Mfengu • Yamkela Mzozoyana • Esto Nasiphi • Ayabonga Nceke • Lee Man Ngcetane • Yamcha Ngodwana • Teenager Ngxolwana • Folau Novuka • CJ Osode • Ayabonga Phelani • Ou-H Plaatjies • Fuzile Qonono • Tshawe Salaze • Lindokuhle Seteni • Mpilonhle Shange • Zuray Sili • Phumlani Thembani • Bathira Tshaka • Silindokuhle Tutu • Daniel van der Merwe • Libongo Yapi • Bonguyise Zulu

Falcons U20 squad
Keanan Alexander • Lian Ambrosius • Kirshen Aploon • JD Beetge • MF Bester • Reece Bocks • Nicolas Botha • Wynand Botha • Jonothan Brits • Brandon Collins • Nico Colyn • Berni de Beer • Dian de Beer • Francois de Beer • Jandre de Beer • Andre de Jager • Jan Harm du Plessis • Bertie Erasmus • Jeandre Esterhuizen • Gift Gomede • Keaton Gordon • Zayvier Hawley • Ruan Janse van Rensburg • Ethan Jantjies • Juan-Reno Jordaan • Mark Jordaan • Lombaard Joubert • Heino Keyser • Sive Mazosiwe • Christopher CJ Murphy • Byron Nysschen • Alton Palmer • Johan Pauley • Joshua Petro • Gavin Pienaar • Hardus Pretorius • Rudi Pretorius • Sherwyn Prins • Enrico Robbertze • Lian Smit • Mike Smit • Martin Steyn • Dylan Stiemmie • Andrew Theunissen • Roan van den Merwe • Pieter van der Lith • Echard van der Westhuizen • Duard van Staden • Juvani Venter • Ruan Vermeulen • Andrew Volschenk • Tashriq Williams • Divan Zwart

Griffons squad
Jean Pierre Alberts • Reginald Alexander • Michiel Bosman • Cyle Davids • Kyle Els • Essie Esterhuizen • Luan James • Duke Jantjies • Luciano Eduardo Jones • Andrew Kota • Jerome Lottering • Stephanus Malherbe • Michael Mamabolo • Granwill Matthys • Neo Mohapi • Balo Mteyise • Allistair Mumba • Jean-Pierre Nortje • Jason Olivier • Steven Pieterse • Tristan Rothman • Mickyle Snyders • Dawid Snyman • Ulrich Stander • Brandon Swart • Roan van den Merwe • Johannes Hermanus van der Merwe • Gideon van Eeden • Hardus van Heerden • Wian van Staden • Duncan van Vuuren • Fanie Vermaak

Griquas U20 squad
De-An Ackermann • Johan Beeslaar • Jacques Beukes • Petrus Johannes Bezuidenhout • Ruan Botha • Jarred Anthony Clegg • Taliesen Dick • Jaun Dorfling • Erasmus Stephanus du Plooy • Lovien Esterhuizen • Whaydon Hedwin Floors • Heinrich Fourie • Willem Barnard Fourie • Chix Griqua • Warren Hart • Cameron Hufke • Danillo Huyster • Thabang Mzingisi Jantjies • Cameron Brian Kritzinger • Andre Kruger • WJ Kruger • Corne Lubbe • Jeandre Lukas • Zanoxolo Makhanga • Jean Marais • Tamisang Shadow Masego • Khaya Mdingi • Benfred Johannes Meiring • Benodict Davidson Moses • Markus Mostert • Songezo Ngozi • Nathan Nienaber • Glen Nieuwoudt • Athole Charles Oliphant • Jason Pietersen • Justin Pietersen • Gerhardus Potgieter • JP Roets • Christopher Rolomana • Trevor Camell Slambert • Jean Smal • Ruan Smit • Daniel Sydney Smith • Jason-Lee Smith • Pieter Snyman • Ruan Stanissis • Gionvano Swartz • Lee Swartz • Phurnal Grant Leigh Swartz • Nakedi Thoka • Willbritte Uys • Spinny van Aswegen • SW van Zyl • Hendrik Abraham Venter • Renier Venter • LW Viljoen • Joe-Lythen Willemse • Lohan Zeelie

Limpopo Blue Bulls U20 squad
Joseph Josephus Anker • Rohan Barnard • Thomas Johannes Bedfort • Aidan Beukes • Chuan Bezuidenhout • Damian Bonaparte • Keanan Boonzaaier • Ruben Breedt • Steven Cockrell • Stefan Coetzee • Tiaan Coetzee • Luke Dan • Thomas de Jager • Peter Diergaardt • Eddie Dlulu • Delaney du Plessis • Carling Forwood • Reynhard Fourie • Miche Groenewald • Ruan Grundelingh • Luke Haynes • Hannes Hendrikse • Michael Jacobs • Ruan Janse van Rensburg • Jeandre Jones • Lee Jordaan • Sergio Kasper • Johannes Kaufmann • Tiisetso Johannes Kekana • Driekus Kleynhans • Carl Koch • Josefa Lalabalavu • Brandan-Lee le Sar • Jacobus Malan • Thizwilondi Mandiwana • Jason Martins • Walter Hulisani Masindi • Jan-Barend Meyer • Xandre Miller • Danny Mokhoabane • Pule Molokomme • Muks Mukendi • Christoff Mulder • Jacobus George Munnik • Henry Nell • Nathan Nienaber • George Valentine Eastland Oosthuizen • Maxwell Osborne • Johan Pauley • Henry Pike • Claude Pitout • Mauritz Pretorius • Jonathan Rabie • JJ Scheepers • Marcel Scholten • Kopano Senne • Ettienn Slabbert • Jordan Smalley • John Robert Smith • Mihlali Stamper • Chrizaan Strauss • Duan Strauss • Johan Strydom • Morne Taylor • Kyle Theron • Tyron Thomson • Du Preez van der Merwe • Dewald van der Vyver • Abu Dharr Venos • Lezardo Vos • Carl Wijburg • Ethan Williams • Stefan Zerwick

Pumas U20 squad
Michael Anthony Benadie • Christiaan Theunis Gertze Botha • Jakes Louwrens Britz • Klaus-Andre Cellar • Ryan Cloete • Gerhard Combrink • Gert Cronje • Douglas Kyle Davidson • Michael Jacob de Lange • Stephanus Jan Esterhuyse • Leon Rudolf Etsebeth • Jean-Pe Ferreira • Marco Grobler • Barend Frederik Hendriks • Dylan Neville Henegan • Shaun Micheal Jacobs • Japie Kleinhans • Xander Kriel • Mario Paul Leemans • Keenan Denaille Maans • Stefan Magro • Johannes Hendrik Maree • Justin-Ray Meyer • Telvin Mhlongo • Lebokgang Siphiwo Mondlane • Ernest Nkosinathi Mthethwa • Daniel Jacobus Nel • Jaundre Nel • Matheus Oberholser • Ryan Phiri • Micheal Francois Rodrigues • Brandon Smit • Mathys Henrico Storm • Ideon van der Merwe • Roy van Loggerenberg • Esuan van Niekerk • Shane van Rooyen • Damon Keagon Viljoen

SWD U20 squad
Vinchenzo Adams • Maurice Brenwin Alexander • Thakga Boloko • Emile Booysen • Franco Boshoff • John-Graham Botha • Willem Coetzee • Adriaan-Lee du Preez • Kuite du Preez • Michael Fernol • Ronaldo Fortuin • Tristan Fourie • Stiaan Grobler • Mario Jacobs • Ronaldo Jansen • Austin Johnson • Aiden Joseph • Winrich Kennedy • Dillon Kerspay • Michael le Roux • Justin Levendal • Bradley Marthinus • Lithemba Mpoli • Luvuyo Ndevu • Leono Oosthuizen • Larry Paulse • Jaywin Petersen • Denver Prins • Julian Christiaan Prins • Conrad Reynolds • Cecil Rittels • Mikyle Roelfse • Joseph Peter Rooyakkers • Willtanio Seconds • Damon Sinuka • Reinhardt Stears • Jarrett Jaqwin Tities • Carolus Johannes van Niekerk • Naigan Wolmarans

== Referees ==
The following referees officiated matches in the 2017 Under-20 Provincial Championship:

2017 Under-20 Provincial Championship referees
Aimee Barrett-Theron • Rodney Boneparte • Ben Crouse • Stephan Geldenhuys • Jaco Kotze • Pieter Maritz • Mpho Matsaung • Ruhan Meiring • Paul Mente • Vusi Msibi • Sindile Ngcese • Jaco Pretorius • Oregopotse Rametsi • Damian Schneider • Archie Sehlako • Ricus van der Hoven • Lourens van der Merwe

== See also ==
- 2017 Currie Cup Premier Division
- 2017 Currie Cup First Division
