= Barnie Boonzaaier =

South African rugby union player

- Full name: Abraham Johannes Stefanus Boonzaaier
- Born: 19 April 1992 (age 34) Swakopmund, Namibia
- Height: 1.84 m (6 ft 1/2 in)
- Weight: 104 kg (16 st 5 lb; 229 lb)
- School: CVO Vivo, Vivo

Rugby union career
- Position: Hooker / Flanker
- Current team: Limpopo Blue Bulls
Youth career
- 2012: Falcons
- 2013: Limpopo Blue Bulls
Senior career
Years	Team	Apps	(Points)
2014–present	Limpopo Blue Bulls	13	(0)
- Correct as of 10 May 2015

Abraham Johannes Stefanus 'Barnie' Boonzaaier (born 19 April 1992 in Swakopmund, Namibia) is a South African rugby union player, currently playing with the Limpopo Blue Bulls. He can play as a hooker or a flanker.

== Career ==
=== Youth ===
Boonzaaier was on the books of East Rand-based side the Falcons in 2012 and was included in the Falcons U21 squad for the 2012 Under-21 Provincial Championship, but failed to make an appearance. In 2013, his home province Limpopo Blue Bulls were included in national competitions and Boonzaaier represented the Limpopo Blue Bulls U21 side in the 2013 Under-21 Provincial Championship, making three appearances as his side finished third in Group B during the regular season to qualify for the semi-final.

=== Limpopo Blue Bulls ===
In 2014, Boonzaaier was promoted to the Limpopo Blue Bulls' senior squad that participated in the 2014 Vodacom Cup competition. He made his first class debut by starting their opening match of the season, a 10–62 defeat to the Griffons. He made a total of six starts in the competition as both a hooker and a flanker, but could not prevent Limpopo Blue Bulls losing all their matches in the competition for the second year in succession.

Despite an overhaul occurring prior to the 2015 Vodacom Cup competition, during which a number of players from Pretoria-based club sides were included in the squad, Boonzaaier was one of few players that remained with the team for the new season and he featured in their opening three matches against the Leopards, the Golden Lions and the Pumas.
