= 1988 Currie Cup Division A =

Domestic rugby union competition

- Countries: South Africa
- Date: 30 April – 1 October 1988
- Champions: Northern Transvaal (15th title)
- Runners-up: Western Province
- Relegated: None

The 1988 Currie Cup Division A (known as the Santam Bank Currie Cup for sponsorship reasons) was the top division of the Currie Cup competition, the premier domestic rugby union competition in South Africa. This was the 50th season since the competition started in 1889.

== Teams ==
Location of teams in 1988 Currie Cup Division A

1988 Currie Cup Division A
Eastern Province
Free State
Natal
Northern Transvaal
South West Africa
Transvaal
Western Province

== Competition ==
=== Regular season and title play-offs ===
There were seven participating teams in the 1988 Currie Cup Division A. These teams played each other twice over the course of the season, once at home and once away. Teams received two points for a win and one point for a draw. The top two teams qualified for the title play-offs (along with the top team from Division B). In the semi-finals, the team that finished second had home advantage against the team that finished top of Division B, while the team that finished top had a bye through to the final. The final was then played at the home venue of the higher-placed team.

=== Relegation play-offs ===
The bottom team on the log qualified for the relegation play-offs. That team played off against the team placed top in Division B over two legs. The winner over these two ties qualified for the 1989 Currie Cup Division A, while the losing team qualified for the 1989 Currie Cup Division B.

== Log ==
1988 Currie Cup Division A log
Pos	Team	Pld	W	D	L	PF	PA	PD	TF	TA	Pts	Qualification
1	Northern Transvaal	12	11	0	1	328	188	+140	35	16	22	Currie Cup final
2	Western Province	12	10	0	2	379	156	+223	53	15	20	Currie Cup semi-final
3	South West Africa	12	6	0	6	254	269	−15	27	30	12	
4	Transvaal	12	5	0	7	253	253	0	30	30	10	
5	Natal	12	4	0	8	225	292	−67	24	32	8	
6	Eastern Province	12	3	0	9	216	334	−118	23	44	6	
7	Free State	12	3	0	9	200	363	−163	22	47	6	Relegation play-off

Rules for classification: 2 points for a win, 1 point for a draw

== Fixtures and Results ==
=== Round one ===
30 April 1988	South West Africa	21 – 9	Free State	Windhoek

30 April 1988	Transvaal	18 – 26	Eastern Province	Johannesburg

30 April 1988	Western Province	51 – 6	Natal	Cape Town

Bye/s: Northern Transvaal

=== Round two ===
7 May 1988	Free State	19 – 44	Transvaal	Bloemfontein

7 May 1988	Natal	32 – 12	South West Africa	Durban

7 May 1988	Northern Transvaal	6 – 24	Western Province	Pretoria

Bye/s: Eastern Province

=== Round three ===
14 May 1988	Eastern Province	51 – 19	Free State	Port Elizabeth

14 May 1988	South West Africa	15 – 34	Northern Transvaal	Windhoek

14 May 1988	Transvaal	22 – 10	Natal	Johannesburg

Bye/s: Western Province

=== Round four ===
21 May 1988	Natal	28 – 9	Eastern Province	Durban

21 May 1988	Northern Transvaal	22 – 18	Transvaal	Pretoria

21 May 1988	Western Province	21 – 24	South West Africa	Cape Town

Bye/s: Free State

=== Round Five ===
4 June 1988	Eastern Province	18 – 30	Northern Transvaal	Port Elizabeth

4 June 1988	Free State	28 – 14	Natal	Bloemfontein

4 June 1988	Transvaal	9 – 28	Western Province	Johannesburg

Bye/s: South West Africa

=== Round Six ===
11 June 1988	South West Africa	15 – 18	Transvaal	Windhoek

11 June 1988	Northern Transvaal	48 – 18	Free State	Pretoria

11 June 1988	Western Province	33 – 6	Eastern Province	Cape Town

Bye/s: Natal

=== Round Seven ===
18 June 1988	Free State	3 – 43	Western Province	Bloemfontein

18 June 1988	Natal	27 – 34	Northern Transvaal	Durban

18 June 1988	Eastern Province	13 – 31	South West Africa	Port Elizabeth

Bye/s: Transvaal

=== Round Eight ===
2 July 1988	South West Africa	26 – 24	Natal	Windhoek

2 July 1988	Transvaal	36 – 13	Free State	Johannesburg

2 July 1988	Western Province	15 – 24	Northern Transvaal	Cape Town

Bye/s: Eastern Province

=== Round Nine ===
23 July 1988	Free State	27 – 25	Eastern Province	Bloemfontein

23 July 1988	Northern Transvaal	18 – 16	South West Africa	Pretoria

23 July 1988	Natal	22 – 18	Transvaal	Durban

Bye/s: Western Province

=== Round Ten ===
6 August 1988	South West Africa	27 – 34	Western Province	Windhoek

6 August 1988	Eastern Province	22 – 20	Natal	Port Elizabeth

6 August 1988	Transvaal	10 – 21	Northern Transvaal	Johannesburg

Bye/s: Free State

=== Round Eleven ===
20 August 1988	Natal	24 – 15	Free State	Durban

20 August 1988	Northern Transvaal	49 – 9	Eastern Province	Pretoria

13 August 1988	Western Province	40 – 21	Transvaal	Cape Town

Bye/s: South West Africa

=== Round Twelve ===
27 August 1988	Eastern Province	10 – 35	Western Province	Port Elizabeth

27 August 1988	Transvaal	22 – 25	South West Africa	Johannesburg

27 August 1988	Free State	12 – 18	Northern Transvaal	Bloemfontein

Bye/s: Natal

=== Round Thirteen ===
3 September 1988	Northern Transvaal	24 – 6	Natal	Pretoria

3 September 1988	South West Africa	27 – 15	Eastern Province	Windhoek

3 September 1988	Western Province	24 – 8	Free State	Cape Town

Bye/s: Transvaal

=== Round Fourteen ===
10 September 1988	Eastern Province	12 – 17	Transvaal	Port Elizabeth

10 September 1988	Free State	29 – 15	South West Africa	Bloemfontein

10 September 1988	Natal	12 – 31	Western Province	Durban

Bye/s: Northern Transvaal

=== Semi-final ===
As champions of Division B, Northern Free State qualified to the semi-finals of the Currie Cup competition, where they met Division A runners-up Western Province.

17 September 1988	Northern Free State	9 – 26	Western Province	North West Stadium, Welkom
		Report

=== Final ===
1 October 1988	Northern Transvaal	19 – 18	Western Province	Loftus Versfeld, Pretoria
		Report

== Relegation play-offs ==
In the relegation play-offs, Northern Free State beat Free State on aggregate and won promotion to Division A. Free State were initially relegated, but Division A was expanded to 8 teams and they retained their place.

24 September 1988	Free State	14 – 40	Northern Free State	Free State Stadium, Bloemfontein
		Report

8 October 1988	Northern Free State	v	Free State	North West Stadium, Welkom
		Report

== See also ==
- 1988 Currie Cup Division B
- 1988 Lion Cup
- 1988 Santam Bank Trophy Division A
- 1988 Santam Bank Trophy Division B
