= Currie Cup / Central Series =

South African rugby competition

- Sport: Rugby union football
- Instituted: 1986
- Inaugural season: 1986
- Ceased: 1994
- Country: South Africa, Namibia
- Most titles: Northern Transvaal 6 titles

The Currie Cup / Central Series was a rugby union competition held between the Currie Cup and Currie Cup Central A teams, the top two tiers of the premier domestic competition in South Africa. This formed part of the 1986-1994 Currie Cup seasons.

The Currie Cup team with the best record would win the Percy Frames Trophy, the Central A team with the best record would win the W.V. Simkins Trophy.

The competition spanned from 1986-1994.

The winners of the Percy Frames Trophy 1986-1994

Percy Frames Trophy Champions
Season	Champions	Runner-Up
1986	Western Province	Transvaal
1987	Northern Transvaal	Transvaal
1988	Northern Transvaal	Western Province
1989	Northern Transvaal	Western Province
1990	Northern Transvaal	Natal
1991	Northern Transvaal	Eastern Province
1992	Northern Transvaal	Natal
1993	Natal	Transvaal
1994	Transvaal	Northern Transvaal

History

The competition originated during the apartheid era, when South African rugby was administered under racially segregated governing bodies. The South African Rugby Board (SARB), established in 1889 for white rugby, organized the first provincial championship that year. In 1891, the touring British Isles team donated the Currie Cup, which became the trophy for South Africa's premier provincial competition from 1892.

Separate governing bodies later organized equivalent competitions for non-white rugby, including the South African Coloured Rugby Football Board's Rhodes Cup (later the SA Cup). During the late 1970s and early 1980s, limited integration occurred as some non-white unions were admitted into SARB-administered competitions, although full unification was not achieved until 1992, following the end of apartheid and the formation of the South African Rugby Football Union (SARFU). The competition was restructured several times before professionalism in 1996 reduced the number of participating provincial unions to fourteen.

== See also ==
- Rugby union in South Africa
- Vodacom Cup
- Lion Cup
