= 1989 Santam Bank Trophy Division A =

Third tier of domestic South African rugby

- Countries: South Africa
- Date: 29 April – 19 August 1989
- Champions: Boland
- Runners-up: Far North
- Promoted: South Eastern Transvaal
- Relegated: None
- Matches played: 30

The 1989 Santam Bank Trophy Division A was the third tier of domestic South African rugby, below the two Currie Cup divisions.

== Teams ==
Location of teams in 1989 Santam Bank Trophy Division A

1989 Santam Bank Trophy Division A
Boland
Border
Far North
North Eastern Cape
Northern Natal
Western Province League

=== Changes between 1988 and 1989 seasons ===
- South Eastern Transvaal were promoted to the Currie Cup Division B.
- Far North were promoted from Division B.

=== Changes between 1989 and 1990 seasons ===
- Divisions A and B merged into one nine-team division.
- Boland, Far North and Western Province League were promoted to the Currie Cup Division B.

== Competition ==
=== Regular season and title play-offs ===
There were six participating teams in the Santam Bank Trophy Division A. Teams played each other twice over the course of the season, once at home and once away. Teams received two points for a win and one point for a draw. The top two teams in the division – along with the top two teams from Division B qualified for the title play-off finals. The team that finished first in Division A would play at home against the team that finished second in Division B and the team that finished second in Division A would play at home against the team that finished first in Division B.

=== Promotion play-offs ===
The Division A champion qualified for the promotion play-offs. That team played off against the team placed sixth in the Currie Cup Division B over two legs. The winner over these two ties qualified for the 1990 Currie Cup Division B, while the losing team qualified for the 1990 Santam Bank Trophy.

=== Relegation play-offs ===
The bottom team on the log qualified for the relegation play-offs. That team played off against the team that won the Santam Bank Trophy Division B over two legs. The winner over these two ties qualified for the 1990 Santam Bank Trophy Division A, while the losing team qualified for the 1989 Santam Bank Trophy Division B.

== Log ==
1989 Santam Bank Trophy Division A Log
Pos	Team	Pl	W	D	L	PF	PA	PD	TF	TA	Pts
1	Boland	10	8	0	2	276	163	+113	39	24	16
2	Far North	10	7	0	3	208	182	+36	24	23	14
3	Western Province League	10	5	2	3	277	161	+116	43	17	12
4	Border	10	4	1	5	183	183	0	14	23	9
5	North Eastern Cape	10	3	1	6	210	239	–29	25	24	7
6	Northern Natal	10	1	0	9	162	388	–226	24	58	2
Boland and Far North qualified for the trophy finals semi-final. Northern Natal qualified for the relegation play-off game. * Legend: Pos = Position, Pl = Played, W = Won, D = Drawn, L = Lost, PF = Points for, PA = Points against, PD = Points difference, TF = Tries for, TA = Tries against, Pts = Log points Points breakdown: *2 points for a win *1 point for a draw

== Fixtures and results ==
=== Round one ===
29 April 1989	Boland	23 – 12	Border	Wellington
		Report

29 April 1989	Far North	15 – 12	Northern Natal	Pietersburg
		Report

29 April 1989	Western Province League	19 – 6	North Eastern Cape	Elsie's River
		Report

=== Round two ===
13 May 1989	Northern Natal	16 – 36	Boland	Newcastle
		Report

13 May 1989	North Eastern Cape	27 – 19	Far North	Burgersdorp
		Report

Bye/s: Border, Western Province League

=== Round three ===
20 May 1989	Border	33 – 3	Northern Natal	East London
		Report

20 May 1989	Far North	10 – 17	Western Province League	Pietersburg
		Report

20 May 1989	North Eastern Cape	16 – 25	Boland	Graaff-Reinet
		Report

=== Round four ===
3 June 1989	North Eastern Cape	21 – 24	Border	Cradock
		Report

3 June 1989	Western Province League	39 – 19	Boland	Paarl
		Report

Bye/s: Far North, Northern Natal

=== Round five ===
10 June 1989	Boland	39 – 19	Far North	Wellington
		Report

10 June 1989	Border	28 – 19	Western Province League	Queenstown
		Report

10 June 1989	Northern Natal	31 – 19	North Eastern Cape	Newcastle
		Report

=== Round six ===
17 June 1989	Western Province League	71 – 10	Northern Natal	Cape Town
		Report

17 June 1989	Far North	18 – 6	Border	Pietersburg
		Report

Bye/s: Boland, North Eastern Cape

=== Round seven ===
24 June 1989	Border	10 – 28	Boland	East London
		Report

24 June 1989	North Eastern Cape	28 – 28	Western Province League	Graaff-Reinet
		Report

24 June 1989	Northern Natal	14 – 60	Far North	Newcastle

=== Round eight ===
15 July 1989	Boland	50 – 7	Northern Natal	Wellington
		Report

15 July 1989	Far North	21 – 16	North Eastern Cape	Pietersburg
		Report

Bye/s: Border, Western Province League

=== Round nine ===
29 July 1989	Northern Natal	15 – 45	Western Province League	Newcastle
		Report

29 July 1989	Border	19 – 20	Far North	East London
		Report

Bye/s: Boland, North Eastern Cape

=== Round ten ===
5 August 1989	Boland	24 – 14	North Eastern Cape	Wellington
		Report

5 August 1989	Border	21 – 18	Northern Natal	tbc

5 August 1989	Western Province League	13 – 14	Far North	tbc
		Report

=== Round eleven ===
12 August 1989	Boland	13 – 8	Western Province League	Wellington
		Report

12 August 1989	Border	12 – 15	North Eastern Cape	East London
		Report

Bye/s: Far North, Northern Natal

=== Round twelve ===
19 August 1989	Far North	22 – 19	Boland	Pietersburg
		Report

19 August 1989	North Eastern Cape	48 – 36	Northern Natal	tbc

19 August 1989	Western Province League	18 – 18	Border	Parow
		Report

== Santam Bank Trophy finals ==
The top two teams from Division A and the top two teams from Division B qualified to the trophy finals:

=== Semi-finals ===
9 September 1989	Boland	21 – 15	Stellaland	Wellington
		Report

9 September 1989	Far North	40 – 33	South Western Districts	Pietersburg
		Report

=== Final ===
16 September 1989	Boland	33 – 9	Far North	Wellington
		Report

== Promotion/relegation play-offs ==
=== Promotion play-offs ===
In the promotion play-offs, Eastern Free State conceded the second leg to Boland, who won promotion to the Currie Cup Division B. Eastern Free State were initially relegated, but due to the Currie Cup Division B's expansion to 8 teams, they retained their place.

23 September 1989	Eastern Free State	9 – 42	Boland	Bethleham
		Report

=== Relegation play-offs ===
In the relegation play-offs, South Western Districts beat Northern Natal on aggregate and won promotion to Division A. However, due to the withdrawal of South West Africa and the Currie Cup Division B being expanded from six teams to eight teams, only nine teams were left in the Santam Bank Trophy and it was decided to merge Division A and Division B into a single division for 1990.

23 September 1989	Northern Natal	28 – 37	South Western Districts	Newcastle
		Report

30 September 1989	South Western Districts	37 – 15	Northern Natal	George
		Report

== See also ==
- 1989 Currie Cup Division A
- 1989 Lion Cup
- 1989 Currie Cup Division B
- 1989 Santam Bank Trophy Division B
