= 1989 Santam Bank Trophy Division B =

Fourth tier of domestic South African rugby

- Countries: South Africa
- Date: 29 April – 19 August 1988
- Champions: South Western Districts
- Runners-up: Stellaland
- Promoted: Lowveld; North Western Cape; SARU; South Western Districts; Stellaland; Winelands
- Relegated: None
- Matches played: 30

The 1989 Santam Bank Trophy Division B was the fourth tier of domestic South African rugby, below the two Currie Cup divisions and Division A.

== Teams ==
Location of teams in 1989 Santam Bank Trophy Division B

1989 Santam Bank Trophy Division B
Lowveld
North Western Cape
SARU
South Western Districts
Stellaland
Winelands

=== Changes between 1988 and 1989 seasons ===
- Division B was reduced from seven to six teams.
- Far North were promoted from to Division A.

=== Changes between 1989 and 1990 seasons ===
- Divisions A and B merged into one nine-team division.

== Competition ==
=== Regular season and title play-offs ===
There were six participating teams in the Santam Bank Trophy Division B. Teams played each other twice over the course of the season, once at home and once away. Teams received two points for a win and one point for a draw. The top two teams in the division – along with the top two teams from Division A qualified for the title play-off finals. The team that finished first in Division A would play at home against the team that finished second in Division B and the team that finished second in Division A would play at home against the team that finished first in Division B.

=== Promotion play-offs ===
The Division B champion qualified for the promotion play-offs. That team played off against the team placed bottom in Division A over two legs. The winner over these two ties qualified for the 1990 Santam Bank Trophy Division A, while the losing team qualified for the 1990 Santam Bank Trophy Division B.

== Log ==
1989 Santam Bank Trophy Division B Log
Pos	Team	Pl	W	D	L	PF	PA	PD	TF	TA	Pts
1	South Western Districts	10	8	0	2	279	118	+161	39	12	16
2	Stellaland	10	8	0	2	191	104	+87	27	8	16
3	Lowveld	10	7	0	3	133	137	–4	13	21	14
4	Winelands	10	3	1	6	151	185	–34	19	22	7
5	North Western Cape	10	2	1	7	136	227	–91	17	32	5
6	SARU	10	1	0	9	113	232	–129	11	31	2
South Western Districts and Stellaland qualified for the trophy finals semi-final. * Legend: Pos = Position, Pl = Played, W = Won, D = Drawn, L = Lost, PF = Points for, PA = Points against, PD = Points difference, TF = Tries for, TA = Tries against, Pts = Log points Points breakdown: *2 points for a win *1 point for a draw

== Fixtures and results ==
=== Round one ===
29 April 1989	Lowveld	12 – 6	SARU	Nelspruit
		Report

29 April 1989	South Western Districts	28 – 18	North Western Cape	Fraserburg
		Report

29 April 1989	Stellaland	26 – 15	Winelands	Lichtenburg
		Report

=== Round two ===
13 May 1989	SARU	21 – 12	North Western Cape	Randfontein
		Report

13 May 1989	Winelands	10 – 14	Lowveld	Malmesbury
		Report

Bye/s: South Western Districts, Stellaland

=== Round three ===
20 May 1989	North Western Cape	25 – 25	Winelands	Upington
		Report

20 May 1989	South Western Districts	46 – 9	SARU	Riversdale
		Report

27 May 1989	Lowveld	9 – 22	Stellaland	Nelspruit
		Report

=== Round four ===
3 June 1989	Stellaland	19 – 6	North Western Cape	Delareyville
		Report

3 June 1989	Winelands	25 – 21	South Western Districts	Caledon
		Report

Bye/s: Lowveld, SARU

=== Round five ===
10 June 1989	SARU	13 – 16	Winelands	Port Elizabeth
		Report

10 June 1989	South Western Districts	16 – 10	Stellaland	Oudtshoorn
		Report

10 June 1989	North Western Cape	3 – 19	Lowveld	Upington
		Report

=== Round six ===
16 June 1989	Lowveld	0 – 14	South Western Districts	Nelspruit
		Report

17 June 1989	Stellaland	21 – 13	SARU	Mafikeng
		Report

Bye/s: North Western Cape, Winelands

=== Round seven ===
23 June 1989	SARU	6 – 14	Lowveld	Orkney
		Report

24 June 1989	South Western Districts	29 – 13	North Western Cape	Mossel Bay
		Report

24 June 1989	Winelands	9 – 12	Stellaland	Saldanha
		Report

=== Round eight ===
15 July 1989	Lowveld	15 – 10	Winelands	Nelspruit
		Report

15 July 1989	North Western Cape	27 – 12	SARU	Upington
		Report

Bye/s: South Western Districts, Stellaland

=== Round nine ===
29 July 1989	South Western Districts	46 – 12	Lowveld	George
		Report

29 July 1989	SARU	4 – 17	Stellaland	Port Elizabeth
		Report

Bye/s: North Western Cape, Winelands

=== Round ten ===
5 August 1989	Lowveld	19 – 13	Stellaland	tbc

5 August 1989	SARU	16 – 45	South Western Districts	Port Elizabeth
		Report

5 August 1989	Winelands	19 – 25	North Western Cape	Wellington
		Report

=== Round eleven ===
12 August 1989	North Western Cape	0 – 36	Stellaland	Upington
		Report

12 August 1989	South Western Districts	21 – 0	Winelands	Swellendam
		Report

Bye/s: Lowveld, SARU

=== Round twelve ===
18 August 1989	Lowveld	19 – 7	North Western Cape	Nelspruit
		Report

19 August 1989	Stellaland	15 – 13	South Western Districts	Thabazimbi
		Report

19 August 1989	Winelands	22 – 13	SARU	Moorreesburg
		Report

== Santam Bank Trophy finals ==
The top two teams from Division A and the top two teams from Division B qualified to the trophy finals:

=== Semi-finals ===
9 September 1989	Boland	21 – 15	Stellaland	Wellington
		Report

9 September 1989	Far North	40 – 33	South Western Districts	Pietersburg
		Report

=== Final ===
16 September 1989	Boland	33 – 9	Far North	Wellington
		Report

== Promotion play-offs ==
In the promotion play-offs, South Western Districts beat Northern Natal on aggregate and won promotion to Division A. However, due to the withdrawal of South West Africa and the Currie Cup Division B being expanded from six teams to eight teams, only nine teams were left in the Santam Bank Trophy and it was decided to merge Division A and Division B into a single division for 1990.

23 September 1988	Northern Natal	28 – 37	South Western Districts	Newcastle
		Report

30 September 1988	South Western Districts	37 – 15	Northern Natal	George
		Report

== See also ==
- 1989 Currie Cup Division A
- 1989 Currie Cup Division B
- 1989 Lion Cup
- 1989 Santam Bank Trophy Division A
