= Cynthia Fraser =

South African political activist (1934–2020)

Cynthia "Ma" Fraser
- Born: 7 December 1934; Elsie's River, Cape Town, South Africa
- Died: 14 June 2020 (aged 85); South Africa
- Citizenship: South African
- Occupation: Political activist
- Years active: 1950s–1990s
- Organization: African National Congress
- Known for: Anti-apartheid activism; involvement in Operation Vula

Cynthia 'Ma' Fraser (7 December 1934 – 14 June 2020) was a South African political activist.

== Biography ==
Born in Elsie's River suburb of Cape Town, Fraser's mother was a trade unionist which drew her into activism at a young age. She passed out leftist newspapers, including New Age, The Spark, and others in Klipfontein. She was also involved in the underground activities of the then-banned African National Congress (ANC) including Operation Vula. The ANC operation, begun in 1986, which sought to smuggle into the country exiled ANC activists and to maintain open communication between ANC activists in prison, public, and exile. After the ANC was unbanned in 1990, she was involved in many of its community initiatives throughout the Western Cape province.
