= 1989 Currie Cup Division B =

Second division of the Currie Cup Rugby competition in South Africa

- Countries: South Africa
- Date: 6 May – 23 September 1988
- Champions: Western Transvaal
- Runners-up: Griqualand West
- Promoted: Western Transvaal
- Relegated: None
- Matches played: 31

The 1989 Currie Cup Division B (known as the Santam Bank Currie Cup for sponsorship reasons) was the second division of the Currie Cup competition, the 50th season in the since it started in 1889.

== Teams ==
Location of teams in 1989 Currie Cup Division B

1989 Currie Cup Division B
Eastern Free State
Eastern Transvaal
Griqualand West
South Eastern Transvaal
Vaal Triangle
Western Transvaal

=== Changes between 1988 and 1989 seasons ===
- Northern Free State were promoted to Division A.
- South Eastern Transvaal were promoted from the Santam Bank Trophy Division A.

=== Changes between 1989 and 1990 seasons ===
- Division B was expanded from six to eight teams.
- Western Transvaal were promoted to Division A.
- Boland, Far North and Western Province League were promoted from the Santam Bank Trophy Division A.

== Competition ==
=== Regular season and title play-offs ===
There were six participating teams in the 1989 Currie Cup Division B. These teams played each other twice over the course of the season, once at home and once away. Teams received two points for a win and one point for a draw. The top two teams qualified for the Division B finals, played at the home venue of the higher-placed team.

The winner of the final also qualified for the 1989 Currie Cup Semi-Final.

=== Promotion play-offs ===
The top team on the log qualified for the promotion play-offs. That team played off against the team placed seventh in Division A over two legs. The winner over these two ties qualified for the 1990 Currie Cup Division A, while the losing team qualified for the 1990 Currie Cup Division B.

=== Relegation play-offs ===
The bottom team on the log qualified for the relegation play-offs. That team played off against the team that won the Santam Bank Trophy Division A over two legs. The winner over these two ties qualified for the 1990 Currie Cup Division B, while the losing team qualified for the 1990 Santam Bank Trophy.

== Log ==
1989 Currie Cup Division B log
Pos	Team	Pld	W	D	L	PF	PA	PD	TF	TA	Pts	Qualification
1	Western Transvaal	10	9	0	1	350	176	+174	42	10	18	Currie Cup semi-finals Division B final
2	Griqualand West	10	6	1	3	278	158	+120	35	9	13	Division B final
3	Eastern Transvaal	10	6	0	4	315	248	+67	37	31	12	
4	Vaal Triangle	10	4	2	4	228	220	+8	27	20	10	
5	South Eastern Transvaal	10	2	1	7	165	268	−103	20	32	5	
6	Eastern Free State	10	1	0	9	171	437	−266	10	69	2	Relegation play-off

Rules for classification: 2 points for a win, 1 point for a draw

== Fixtures and results ==
=== Round one ===
6 May 1989	Eastern Free State	21 – 32	South Eastern Transvaal	Reitz
		Report

6 May 1989	Eastern Transvaal	21 – 16	Griqualand West	Springs
		Report

6 May 1989	Western Transvaal	33 – 15	Vaal Triangle	Potchefstroom
		Report

=== Round two ===
13 May 1989	Griqualand West	44 – 12	Eastern Free State	Kimberley
		Report

13 May 1989	South Eastern Transvaal	15 – 49	Western Transvaal	Witbank
		Report

Bye/s: Eastern Transvaal, Vaal Triangle

=== Round three ===
20 May 1989	Eastern Free State	12 – 52	Eastern Transvaal	Bethlehem
		Report

20 May 1989	Vaal Triangle	9 – 9	South Eastern Transvaal	Sasolburg
		Report

20 May 1989	Western Transvaal	21 – 15	Griqualand West	Potchefstroom
		Report

=== Round four ===
3 June 1989	Eastern Transvaal	36 – 57	Western Transvaal	Springs
		Report

3 June 1989	Griqualand West	30 – 6	Vaal Triangle	Kimberley
		Report

Bye/s: Eastern Free State, South Eastern Transvaal

=== Round five ===
10 June 1989	South Eastern Transvaal	10 – 28	Griqualand West	Witbank
		Report

10 June 1989	Vaal Triangle	43 – 15	Eastern Transvaal	Sasolburg
		Report

10 June 1989	Western Transvaal	42 – 24	Eastern Free State	Potchefstroom
		Report

=== Round six ===
17 June 1989	Eastern Free State	12 – 35	Vaal Triangle	Bethlehem
		Report

17 June 1989	South Eastern Transvaal	15 – 27	Eastern Transvaal	Witbank
		Report

Bye/s: Griqualand West, Western Transvaal

=== Round seven ===
15 July 1989	Griqualand West	22 – 27	Eastern Transvaal	Kimberley
		Report

15 July 1989	South Eastern Transvaal	25 – 30	Eastern Free State	Witbank
		Report

15 July 1989	Vaal Triangle	16 – 28	Western Transvaal	Sasolburg
		Report

=== Round eight ===
29 July 1989	Griqualand West	19 – 18	Western Transvaal	Kimberley
		Report

Bye/s: Eastern Free State, Eastern Transvaal, South Eastern Transvaal, Vaal Triangle

=== Round nine ===
5 August 1989	Eastern Free State	6 – 58	Griqualand West	Bethlehem
		Report

5 August 1989	Western Transvaal	26 – 3	South Eastern Transvaal	Potchefstroom
		Report

Bye/s: Eastern Transvaal, Vaal Triangle

=== Round ten ===
12 August 1989	Eastern Transvaal	66 – 12	Eastern Free State	Brakpan
		Report

12 August 1989	South Eastern Transvaal	31 – 14	Vaal Triangle	Witbank
		Report

Bye/s: Griqualand West, Western Transvaal

=== Round eleven ===
19 August 1989	Vaal Triangle	21 – 21	Griqualand West	Sasolburg
		Report

19 August 1989	Western Transvaal	30 – 9	Eastern Transvaal	Potchefstroom
		Report

Bye/s: Eastern Free State, South Eastern Transvaal

=== Round twelve ===
9 September 1989	Eastern Free State	24 – 46	Western Transvaal	Bethlehem
		Report

9 September 1989	Eastern Transvaal	23 – 32	Vaal Triangle	Springs
		Report

9 September 1989	Griqualand West	25 – 16	South Eastern Transvaal	Kimberley

=== Round thirteen ===
16 September 1989	Eastern Transvaal	39 – 9	South Eastern Transvaal	Springs

16 September 1989	Vaal Triangle	18 – 37	Eastern Free State	Sasolburg

Bye/s: Griqualand West, Western Transvaal

=== Final ===
23 September 1988	Western Transvaal	15 – 9	Griqualand West	Potchefstroom
		Report

== Currie Cup Semi-Final ==
As champions of Division B, Western Transvaal qualified to the semi-finals of the main Currie Cup competition, where they met Division A runners-up Western Province.

30 September 1989	Western Transvaal	9 – 71	Western Province	Potchefstroom
		Report

== Promotion/relegation play-offs ==
=== Promotion play-offs ===
In the promotion play-offs, Western Transvaal were due to meet Eastern Province, but play-off games were not played. At the end of September 1989, the South African Rugby Board announced that South West Africa would not play in the 1990 Currie Cup competition and that Western Transvaal would be automatically promoted. Despite suggestions that South West Africa would be allowed back into the Currie Cup, South West Africa later voluntarily withdrew, due to uncertainty arising from Namibia gaining independence.

=== Relegation play-offs ===
In the relegation play-offs, Eastern Free State conceded the second leg to Boland, who won promotion to the Currie Cup Division B. Eastern Free State were initially relegated, but due to the Currie Cup Division B's expansion to 8 teams, they eventually retained their place.

23 September 1989	Eastern Free State	9 – 42	Boland	Bethleham
		Report

== See also ==
- 1989 Currie Cup Division A
- 1989 Lion Cup
- 1989 Santam Bank Trophy Division A
- 1989 Santam Bank Trophy Division B
