= Lion Cup =

Rugby union competition in South Africa

- Sport: Rugby union football
- Instituted: 1983
- Inaugural season: 1983
- Ceased: 1994
- Country: South Africa, Namibia
- Most titles: Transvaal 5 titles

The Lion Cup was a premier domestic rugby union knock-out competition in South Africa. The first Lion Cup was held in 1983 when the Free State took the first title facing Transvaal at Ellis Park. The last season was held in 1994.

== Finals results in the Lion Cup ==
Lion Champions and Finals Results
Season	Champions	Runner-up	Final result	Final venue
1983	Free State	Transvaal	24-12	Ellis Park
1984	Western Province	Free State	30-22	Newlands
1985	Northern Transvaal	Free State	12-10	Bloemfontein
1986	Transvaal	Free State	22-12	Bloemfontein
1987	Transvaal	Northern Transvaal	24-18	Ellis Park
1988	Western Province	Northern Transvaal	24-12	Loftus Versfeld
1989	Western Province	Northern Transvaal	21-16	Newlands
1990	Northern Transvaal	Western Province	25-12	Loftus Versfeld
1991	Northern Transvaal	Natal	62-6	Loftus Versfeld
1992	Transvaal	Free State	17-12	Ellis Park
1993	Transvaal	Natal	20-11	Ellis Park
1994	Transvaal	Western Province	29-20	Ellis Park

== See also ==
- Rugby union in South Africa
- Vodacom Cup
- Currie Cup / Central Series
