= Elsie's River =

Elsie's River Elsiesrivier
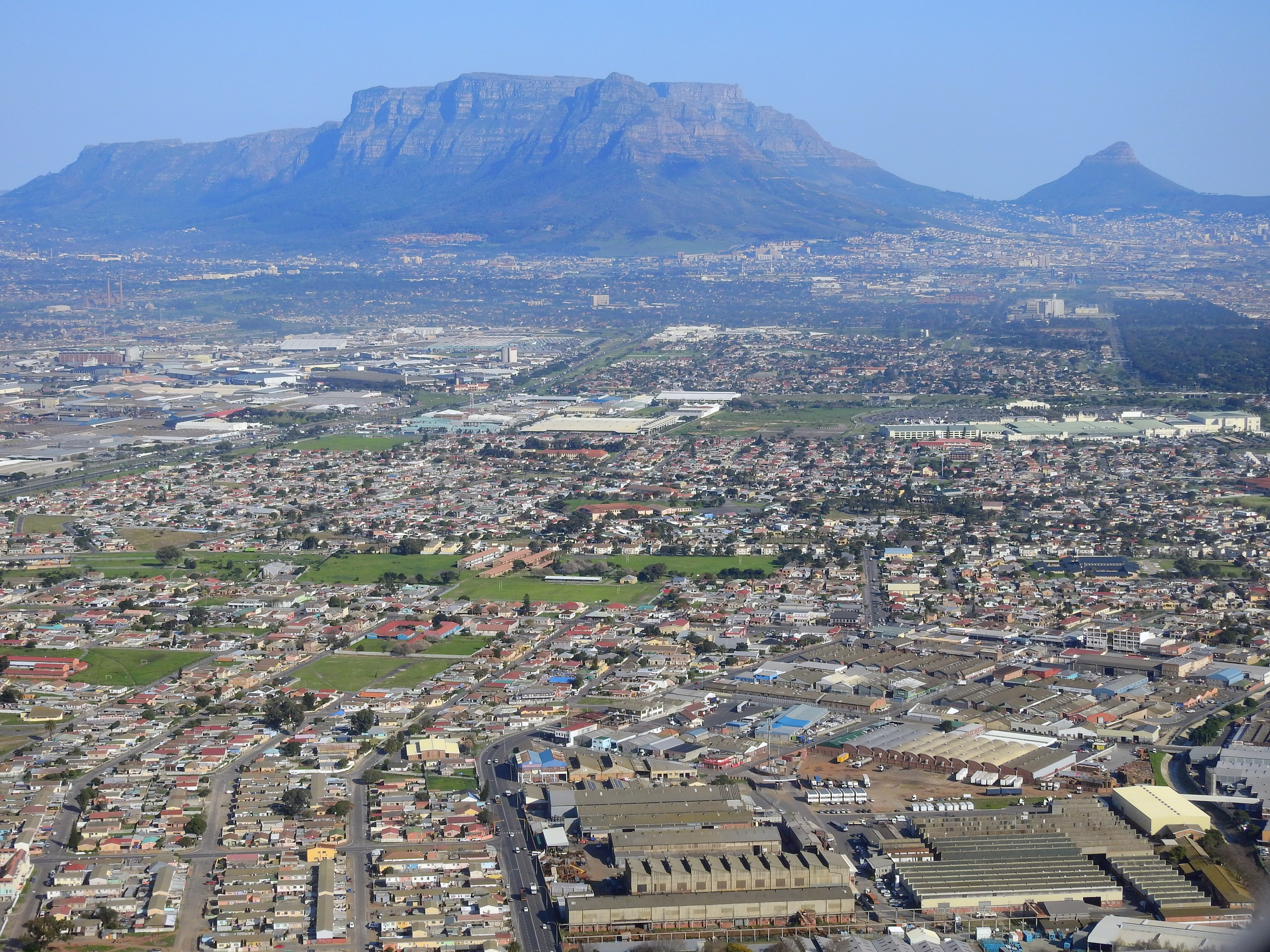
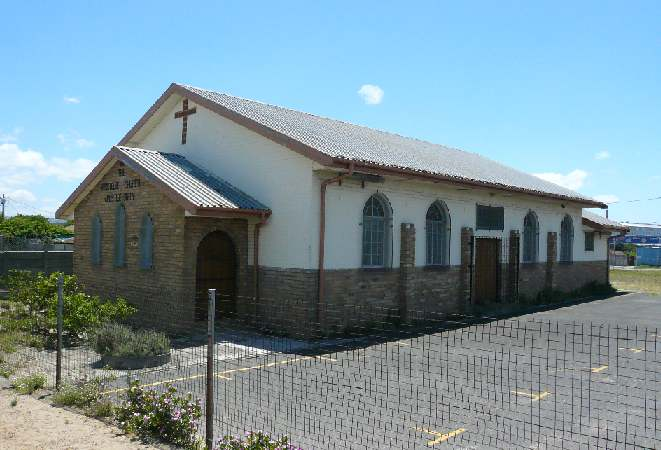
- From top, an aerial view of Elsie's River with Elsie's River Industrial area in the foreground and Devils Peak and Table Mountain in the background. Below, a church in Elsie's River.

- Location within Western Cape Location within South Africa
- Coordinates: 33°55′5″S 18°34′36″E
- Country: South Africa
- Province: Western Cape
- Municipality: City of Cape Town

Area
  - Total: 5.52 km^{2} (2.13 sq mi)

Population (2011)
  - Total: 42,479
  - Density: 7,700/km^{2} (19,900/sq mi)

Racial makeup (2011)
  - Black African: 6.8%
  - Coloured: 91.4%
  - Indian/Asian: 0.5%
  - White: 0.3%
  - Other: 1.0%

First languages (2011)
  - Afrikaans: 77.4%
  - English: 19.2%
  - Other: 3.3%
- Time zone: UTC+2 (SAST)
- Postal code (street): 7490
- PO box: 7480

Elsie's River (Elsiesrivier in Afrikaans) is a suburb of Cape Town, South Africa. It is situated in the city's Cape Flats region.

== History ==
Elsies River was probably named after Elsje van Suurwaarde who farmed in the area in 1698. Baptized on 8 October 1662 in the Cape of Good Hope, Elsje was a matriarch who outlived her husbands and worked the land until she died. After her death, her farm passed through the hands of many landowners.

In the mid, to late 1800s, Elsies River operated as a halt. The Transatlantic Rail from Cape Town Central had a major stop at Elsies River Station. People with wagons from surrounding areas would gather to meet the train at the halt (hence the name Halt Road still today). There was ample water in the Elsies Kraal River to quench thirsty horses and the Arcadia Coffee House served much-needed refreshments for tired travellers. Some of the new landowners included William Walthen (1846) and Gideon Hoffmeyer (1879). With the growing influx of coloured people into Elsies River, landowners like Walthen and Hoffmeyer started rental arrangements with these coloured people and properties were divided. There was plenty of wood in Elsies River and people could build shacks and informal dwellings, cheaply, and there was ample water in the Elsies Kraal River for drinking, cleaning, washing, etc. In the 1920s, the Great Depression hit South Africa and the Cape, and in the late 1920s and the early 1930s more families from the rural areas made their way to the 'convenient area', Elsies River, which now included areas such as Clarke Estate, Avondale Estate, Eureka Estate, amongst others. Some of the influential-coloured families back then were the Braafs and the Kruywagens. They lived on extended family grounds, often referred to as "die bos" which is literally translated as "the bush". However, a more accurate translation would be ‘clan' or as in a "bunch of people". So, for example, the area where the Braafs lived was referred to as "Braaf se bos" or the place where the Braaf clan stayed.

By 1940, there were an estimated 50,000 coloured people living in the Elsies River area, and in 1942 it was labelled as one of the "black spots" in the Cape Peninsula due to ever-increasing population, sanitation and other health issues, and high infant mortality rates (2 out if every 10 babies dies before age one). From 1940 onwards, industry in the area was on the increase with big business such as G.H Starck - the plywood company opening - employment opportunities for locals, and in the nearby Voortrekker Road - in Parow - big retail stores, such as Grand Bazaars, opened their doors.

In 1980 the suburb, at the time restricted to coloured people, became the scene of bloodshed after a demonstration in support of the school boycott became violent. Two 15-year-olds were shot dead by police.

Today, Elsie's River has many public places such as libraries, supermarkets, and a civic hall.

== Education ==
Schools located in Elsie's River include; Elsies River High School, The Range High School, Elswood High School, Marion RC High School, Valhalla High School, The Range Primary School, Elnor Primary school, Matroosfontein Primary School, Elsbury Primary School and J.S. Klopper Primary School, Matroosfontein's Badge, Eldene Primary School, Valhalla Primary School, Leonsdale Primary School, Balvenie Primary School, Elswood Primary School, Norwood Primary School, Holy Trinity Primary School, Clarke Primary School, Edward Primary School, and Eureka Primary School.

== Notable residents ==
- Tony Cedras, musician
- Cynthia Fraser, ANC activist
