= 1989 Currie Cup Division A =

Premier domestic rugby union competition in South Africa

- Countries: South Africa
- Date: 28 April – 7 October 1989
- Champions: Northern Transvaal (16th title) / Western Province (29th title)
- Relegated: South West Africa (withdrew)

The 1989 Currie Cup Division A (known as the Santam Bank Currie Cup for sponsorship reasons) was the top division of the Currie Cup competition, the premier domestic rugby union competition in South Africa. This was the 51st season since the competition started in 1889.

== Teams ==
Location of teams in 1989 Currie Cup Division A

1989 Currie Cup Division A
Eastern Province
Free State
Natal
Northern Free State
Northern Transvaal
South West Africa
Transvaal
Western Province

=== Changes between 1988 and 1989 seasons ===
- Division A was expanded from seven to eight teams.
- Northern Free State were promoted from Division B.

=== Changes between 1989 and 1990 seasons ===
- South West Africa withdrew.
- Western Transvaal were promoted from Division B.

== Competition ==
=== Regular season and title play-offs ===
There were eight participating teams in the 1989 Currie Cup Division A. These teams played each other twice over the course of the season, once at home and once away. Teams received two points for a win and one point for a draw. The top two teams qualified for the title play-offs (along with the top team from Division B). In the semi-finals, the team that finished second had home advantage against the team that finished top of Division B, while the team that finished top had a bye through to the final. The final was then played at the home venue of the higher-placed team.

==== Relegation play-offs ====
The bottom team on the log qualified for the relegation play-offs. That team played off against the team placed top in Division B over two legs. The winner over these two ties qualified for the 1990 Currie Cup Division A, while the losing team qualified for the 1990 Currie Cup Division B.

== Log ==
1989 Currie Cup Division A log
Pos	Team	Pld	W	D	L	PF	PA	PD	TF	TA	Pts	Qualification
1	Northern Transvaal	14	14	0	0	530	195	+335	71	17	28	Currie Cup final
2	Western Province	14	10	0	4	431	258	+173	56	30	20	Currie Cup semi-final
3	Free State	14	8	0	6	336	272	+64	35	22	16	
4	Transvaal	14	7	0	7	408	371	+37	46	48	14	
5	Natal	14	7	0	7	327	313	+14	39	34	14	
6	South West Africa (Note: South West Africa withdrew from the competition following Namibian independence.)	14	4	0	10	248	434	−186	28	53	8	Withdrew
7	Northern Free State	14	3	0	11	262	434	−172	28	52	6	
8	Eastern Province	14	3	0	11	211	476	−265	18	68	6	

Rules for classification: 2 points for a win, 1 point for a draw

== Fixtures and results ==
=== Round one ===
29 April 1989	Eastern Province	15 – 45	Transvaal	Port Elizabeth
		Report

29 April 1989	Free State	18 – 12	South West Africa	Bloemfontein
		Report

29 April 1989	Northern Transvaal	27 – 18	Northern Free State	Pretoria
		Report

29 April 1989	Natal	17 – 21	Western Province	Durban
		Report

=== Round two ===
6 May 1989	Northern Free State	56 – 15	Eastern Province	Welkom
		Report

6 May 1989	South West Africa	12 – 45	Natal	Windhoek
		Report

6 May 1989	Transvaal	32 – 24	Free State	Johannesburg
		Report

6 May 1989	Western Province	18 – 30	Northern Transvaal	Cape Town
		Report

=== Round three ===
13 May 1989	Free State	46 – 12	Eastern Province	Bloemfontein
		Report

13 May 1989	Natal	16 – 10	Transvaal	Durban
		Report

13 May 1989	Northern Free State	27 – 22	Western Province	Welkom
		Report

13 May 1989	Northern Transvaal	55 – 13	South West Africa	Pretoria
		Report

=== Round four ===
20 May 1989	Eastern Province	27 – 18	Natal	Port Elizabeth
		Report

20 May 1989	Free State	23 – 12	Northern Free State	Bloemfontein
		Report

20 May 1989	South West Africa	24 – 27	Western Province	Windhoek
		Report

20 May 1989	Transvaal	15 – 46	Northern Transvaal	Johannesburg
		Report

=== Round five ===
3 June 1989	Natal	16 – 21	Free State	Durban
		Report

3 June 1989	Northern Free State	22 – 15	South West Africa	Welkom
		Report

3 June 1989	Northern Transvaal	50 – 6	Eastern Province	Pretoria
		Report

3 June 1989	Western Province	35 – 15	Transvaal	Cape Town
		Report

=== Round six ===
10 June 1989	Eastern Province	11 – 25	Western Province	Port Elizabeth
		Report

10 June 1989	Free State	16 – 24	Northern Transvaal	Bloemfontein
		Report

10 June 1989	Natal	40 – 9	Northern Free State	Durban
		Report

10 June 1989	Transvaal	46 – 28	South West Africa	Johannesburg
		Report

=== Round seven ===
17 June 1989	Northern Free State	19 – 27	Transvaal	Welkom
		Report

17 June 1989	Northern Transvaal	58 – 15	Natal	Pretoria
		Report

17 June 1989	South West Africa	32 – 20	Eastern Province	Windhoek
		Report

17 June 1989	Western Province	29 – 6	Free State	Cape Town
		Report

=== Round eight ===
15 July 1989	Eastern Province	25 – 0	Northern Free State	Port Elizabeth
		Report

15 July 1989	Free State	22 – 12	Transvaal	Bloemfontein
		Report

15 July 1989	Natal	22 – 16	South West Africa	Durban
		Report

15 July 1989	Northern Transvaal	24 – 9	Western Province	Pretoria
		Report

=== Round nine ===
29 July 1989	Free State	26 – 27	Natal	Bloemfontein
		Report

Bye/s: Eastern Province, Northern Free State, Northern Transvaal, South West Africa, Transvaal, Western Province

=== Round ten ===
5 August 1989	Eastern Province	21 – 33	Free State	Port Elizabeth
		Report

5 August 1989	South West Africa	3 – 71	Northern Transvaal	Windhoek
		Report

5 August 1989	Transvaal	38 – 20	Natal	Johannesburg
		Report

5 August 1989	Western Province	54 – 13	Northern Free State	Cape Town
		Report

=== Round eleven ===
12 August 1989	Natal	24 – 3	Eastern Province	Durban
		Report

12 August 1989	Northern Free State	13 – 40	Free State	Welkom
		Report

12 August 1989	Northern Transvaal	38 – 24	Transvaal	Pretoria
		Report

12 August 1989	Western Province	47 – 6	South West Africa	Cape Town
		Report

=== Round twelve ===
19 August 1989	Eastern Province	12 – 27	Northern Transvaal	Port Elizabeth
		Report

19 August 1989	South West Africa	24 – 12	Northern Free State	Windhoek
		Report

19 August 1989	Transvaal	27 – 35	Western Province	Johannesburg
		Report

Bye/s: Free State, Natal

=== Round thirteen ===
9 September 1989	Northern Free State	22 – 27	Natal	Welkom
		Report

9 September 1989	Northern Transvaal	29 – 24	Free State	Pretoria
		Report

9 September 1989	South West Africa	25 – 15	Transvaal	Windhoek
		Report

9 September 1989	Western Province	64 – 12	Eastern Province	Cape Town
		Report

=== Round fourteen ===
16 September 1989	Eastern Province	16 – 6	South West Africa	Port Elizabeth
		Report

16 September 1989	Free State	19 – 11	Western Province	Bloemfontein
		Report

16 September 1989	Natal	13 – 18	Northern Transvaal	Durban
		Report

16 September 1989	Transvaal	52 – 30	Northern Free State	Johannesburg
		Report

=== Round fifteen ===
23 September 1989	Northern Free State	9 – 33	Northern Transvaal	Welkom
		Report

23 September 1989	South West Africa	22 – 18	Free State	Windhoek
		Report

23 September 1989	Transvaal	50 – 16	Eastern Province	Johannesburg
		Report

23 September 1989	Western Province	32 – 27	Natal	Cape Town
		Report

=== Semi-finals ===
30 September 1989	Eastern Transvaal	9 – 71	Western Province	Potchefstroom
		Report

=== Final ===
7 October 1989	Western Province	16 – 16	Northern Transvaal	Cape Town
		Report

== Relegation play-offs ==
The promotion/relegation play-off games between Eastern Province and Western Transvaal were not played. At the end of September 1989, the South African Rugby Board announced that South West Africa would not play in the 1990 Currie Cup competition and that Western Transvaal would be automatically promoted. Despite suggestions that South West Africa would be allowed back into the Currie Cup, South West Africa later voluntarily withdrew, due to uncertainty arising from Namibia gaining independence.

== See also ==
- 1989 Currie Cup Division B
- 1989 Lion Cup
- 1989 Santam Bank Trophy Division A
- 1989 Santam Bank Trophy Division B
