= Welwitschias =

Namibian rugby union team

(Namibia) Welwitschias
- Union: Namibia Rugby Union
- Emblem: African fish eagle
- Region: Namibia
- Ground: Hage Geingob Rugby Stadium (Capacity: 10,000)
- Coach(es): Jaco Engels and JP Nel
- Captain: Eugene Jantjies
- League: Currie Cup First Division
1st kit	2nd kit

Official website
- www.nru.com.na
- Current season

The Welwitschias, currently known as the Windhoek Draught Welwitschias due to sponsorship by Namibia Breweries Limited, are a Namibian rugby union team that often participates in South African domestic competitions. As of 2021, they are regular participants in the annual Rugby Challenge tournament, having previously played in the Currie Cup and Vodacom Cup.

They are based in Windhoek and play their home matches in the Hage Geingob Rugby Stadium. The team mainly consists of players that play club rugby for teams in Namibia and is seen as a development team for the Namibia national team.

== History ==
Prior to Namibia's independence in 1990, the region – then a South African mandate known as South West Africa – often participated in South African domestic competitions, such as the Currie Cup and Lion Cup. South West Africa played in the Currie Cup for the first time in 1954. In 1987, they reached the semi-finals of the competition after beating Western Transvaal in the Division B final, and in 1988 they achieved their highest-ever finish of third in the competition. At the end of 1989, South West Africa withdrew from all South African domestic competitions due to uncertainty surrounding Namibia gaining independence.

In 1999, a side from Namibia called the Kudus participated in the 1999 Vodacom Cup competition. They were rebranded as the Welwitschias (named after the Welwitschia plant, one of the national symbols of Namibia) for the 2000 and 2001 editions of the competition, finishing bottom of their section in all three seasons. They withdrew from the competition prior to the 2002 season, only returning after an eight-year absence to take part in the 2010 and 2011 competitions. They finished ahead of the Falcons in the 2010 event, but returned to the bottom of the log in 2011. After again not entering a team for the next three seasons, they returned to play in the 2015 Vodacom Cup in preparation for the 2015 Rugby World Cup held later that year.

In 2015, it was announced that the Welwitschias would return to playing in the Currie Cup competition on an annual basis from 2016 onwards.

The Eastern Province elephants have put 110 points on this team in a single match.

== Current squad ==
The following players were included in the Welwitschias squad for the 2019 Rugby Challenge series:

Welwitschias Rugby Challenge squad
**Props**: Graham April; **Jason Benade**; **AJ de Klerk**; Calla Freygang; **André Rademeyer**; Wilfred Saunderson; **Des Sethie**; Hauta Veii; **Hookers**: Gerhard Thirion; **Louis van der Westhuizen**; **Niël van Vuuren**; **Roderique Victor**; **Locks**: Rheinhardt Carelse; **Max Katjijeko**; Enzio Kotzee; Jandre Lamprecht; **Ruan Ludick**; **Mahepisa Tjeriko**	**Loose forwards**: **Adriaan Booysen**; **Wian Conradie**; **Leneve Damens**; Mogamat Emamdien; **Thomasau Forbes**; Berry Gande; **Prince ǃGaoseb**; Joshua Jacobs; Simon Kanime; **Rohan Kitshoff** (c); Uazikamisa Mieze; Gilad Plaatjies; Driaan Vorster; **Scrum-halves**: **Eugene Jantjies**; Jay-C Olivier; JC Winckler; **Fly-halves**: **Cliven Loubser**; **Henrique Olivier**; **PW Steenkamp**	**Centres**: Hillian Beukes; **Darryl de la Harpe**; **Janry du Toit**; **JC Greyling**; Brandon Groenewald; Jamie Joseph; **Justin Newman**; **Johann Tromp**; **Wingers**: Tuna Amutenya; Chris Arries; Nikin Cloete; Paulus Hangula; **Dumarcho Hartung**; **Oderich Mouton**; **Chad Plato**; Milaan van Wyk; **Russell van Wyk**; **PJ Walters**; **Fullbacks**: **Chrysander Botha**; Lorenzo Louis; Mahco Prinsloo; Jeandre Loubser
(c) denotes team captain and **Bold** denotes internationally capped.
