= Limpopo Blue Bulls =

South African rugby union team

(South Africa) Limpopo Blue Bulls
- Union: Blue Bulls Rugby Union
- Region: Limpopo, South Africa
- Ground(s): Peter Mokaba Stadium, Polokwane (Capacity: 45,500)
- Coach: André Eloff
- League: Vodacom Cup
- 2015: 8th (North Section)

Limpopo Blue Bulls (known as the Assupol Limpopo Blue Bulls for sponsorship reasons) are a South African rugby union team that are a sub-union of the Blue Bulls Rugby Union and are therefore represented by the Blue Bulls in the annual Currie Cup and Vodacom Cup tournaments. They play out of Polokwane at the Peter Mokaba Stadium and draw players from the entire Limpopo province in South Africa. Between 2013 and 2015, the Limpopo Blue Bulls played as a separate team in the Vodacom Cup competition. Despite their first team not participating in first class rugby since 2015, they still have youth teams that participate in competitions such as the Under-21 and Under-19 Provincial Championships and in the Craven Week and Grant Khomo Week tournaments. They also have a women's team who compete in the South African Rugby Women's First Division.

== History ==
=== Far North (1968–1995) ===
In 1967, the Far North Rugby Union was formed. They were based in Pietersburg (now Polokwane) and participated in domestic South African competitions between 1968 and 1995, when the advent of professionalism in South African rugby union saw the number of provincial unions reduced to 14. Far North merged with Northern Transvaal to become the Blue Bulls.

=== Vodacom Cup (2013–2015) ===
They played as an independent team in the Vodacom Cup, starting in the 2013 season.

It was a very disappointing season, with the Limpopo Blue Bulls breaking several unwanted records, including the biggest ever first class loss recorded in South African rugby history, when they lost 161–3 to the Golden Lions on 27 April 2013.

They also conceded 100 points or more in their matches against the Leopards (113–3), Griquas (124–5), Pumas (154–0) and Blue Bulls (110–0).

They slightly improved in their second season in the competition, conceding nearly 200 points less in their seven matches. However, they still lost all of their matches and conceded 100 points or more in two of their matches — against the Golden Lions and against their parent union side, the Blue Bulls.

The Limpopo Blue Bulls took a different approach in the build-up to the 2015 Vodacom Cup. In 2013 and 2014, they selected the best players from across the Limpopo province – excluding the players of the best club in the region, Noordelikes, who competed in the SARU Community Cup at the same time as the Vodacom Cup competition – for 2015, they decided to train in Pretoria and also employ the help of some club players from the Blue Bulls region, most notably Oostelike Eagles, who contributed 17 players to their 2015 training squad. Their record in 2015 was once again much-improved; they only conceded 50 points or more in two matches – a 52–0 defeat to the Pumas and an 83–13 defeat to the Blue Bulls. They scored more than twice the number of points they scored in 2014 and conceded half the number of points. They also earned their first log points when they lost their match against the Welwitschias by less than seven points – going down 17–24 in Windhoek – and gained their first log point for scoring four tries in a match in their final game of the season, a 27–38 defeat to the Falcons.

== Records ==
Limpopo Blue Bulls records:

Team Match Records
Record	Opposition	Venue	Season	
Biggest win:	N/A	N/A	N/A	N/A
Heaviest defeat:	Golden Lions	Alberton Rugby Club	2013	3–161
Highest score:	Griffons	North West Stadium, Welkom	2015	28
Most points conceded:	Golden Lions	Alberton Rugby Club	2013	161
Most tries:	Falcons	Peter Mokaba Stadium, Polokwane	2015	4

Player Match Records
Record	Player	Opposition	Venue	Season	
Most points by a player:	Anton Beswick	Griffons	North West Stadium, Welkom	2015	13
Most tries by a player:	Various	Various	Various	Various	1

Team Season Records
Record	Matches	Season	
Most team points:	in 7 matches	2015	115
Most team tries:	in 7 matches	2015	12

Player Season Records
Record	Player	Season	
Most points by a player:	Anton Beswick	2015	55
Most tries by a player:	Niyaas Johnson	2014	2
Most tries by a player:	Dwayne Pienaar	2015	2
Most tries by a player:	Fanie Raseroka	2015	2

Player Career Records
Record	Player	Seasons	
Most appearances:	Barnie Boonzaaier	2014–2015	13
Most appearances:	Johan Coetzer	2013–2014	13
Most points:	Anton Beswick	2015	55
Most tries:	Niyaas Johnson	2014	2
Most tries:	Dwayne Pienaar	2015	2
Most tries:	Fanie Raseroka	2015	2

== Vodacom Cup ==
The Limpopo Blue Bulls' all-time record in the Vodacom Cup since their entry into the competition in 2013 is:

Limpopo Blue Bulls' Vodacom Cup record
Season	Played	Won	Drawn	Lost	Pts For	Pts Ag	Pts Diff	Tries For	Tries Ag	Log Pts
2013	7	0	0	7	32	781	−749	3	119	0
2014	7	0	0	7	47	580	−533	6	90	0
2015	7	0	0	7	115	290	−175	12	43	2
Overall	21	0	0	21	194	1651	−1457	21	252	2
