= 1990 Santam Bank Trophy =

Domestic rugby union competition

- Countries: South Africa
- Date: 5 May – 15 September 1990
- Champions: Border
- Runners-up: Stellaland
- Matches played: 37

The 1989 Santam Bank Trophy was the third tier of domestic South African rugby, below the two Currie Cup divisions.

== Teams ==
Location of teams in 1990 Santam Bank Trophy

1990 Santam Bank Trophy
Border
Lowveld
North Eastern Cape
Northern Natal
North Western Cape
SARU
South Western Districts
Stellaland
Winelands

=== Changes between 1989 and 1990 seasons ===
- Divisions A and B merged into one nine-team division.
- Boland, Far North and Western Province League were promoted to the Currie Cup Division B.

=== Changes between 1990 and 1991 seasons ===
- The 1990 season was the last edition of the Santam Bank Trophy. Instead, these teams were included in a Currie Cup Rural Division, which had a four-team Division C and a five-team Division D.
- Border were promoted to the 1991 Currie Cup Central B.
- Eastern Free State were relegated from 1990 Currie Cup Division B to the 1991 Currie Cup Rural C.
- North Eastern Cape, Northern Natal and Stellaland moved to the 1991 Currie Cup Rural C.
- Lowveld, North Western Cape, SARU, South Western Districts and Winelands moved to the 1991 Currie Cup Rural D.

== Competition ==
=== Regular season and title play-offs ===
There were nine participating teams in the Santam Bank Trophy Division A. Teams played each other once over the course of the season, either at home or away. Teams received two points for a win and one point for a draw. The top two teams in the division qualified for the title play-off finals. The team that finished first would play at home against the team that finished second.

== Log ==
The final standings after the pool stage of the Santam Bank Trophy was as follows:

1990 Santam Bank Trophy Log
Pos	Team	Pl	W	D	L	PF	PA	PD	TF	TA	Pts
1	Border	8	7	0	1	196	90	+106	22	10	14
2	Stellaland	8	6	0	2	179	123	+56	24	12	12
3	North Eastern Cape	8	5	0	3	224	119	+105	38	13	10
4	Northern Natal	8	5	0	3	159	156	+3	20	15	10
5	South Western Districts	8	4	0	4	110	106	+4	11	9	8
6	SARU	8	3	0	5	152	209	–57	21	29	6
7	Lowveld	8	3	0	5	110	153	–43	12	24	6
8	Winelands	8	2	0	6	120	171	–51	20	28	4
9	North Western Cape	8	1	0	7	124	247	–123	11	39	2
Border was promoted to the 1991 Currie Cup Central B. Border and Stellaland qualified for the trophy Final. * Legend: Pos = Position, Pl = Played, W = Won, D = Drawn, L = Lost, PF = Points for, PA = Points against, PD = Points difference, TF = Tries for, TA = Tries against, Pts = Log points Points breakdown: *2 points for a win *1 point for a draw

== Fixtures and results ==
=== Round one ===
5 May 1990	North Eastern Cape	7–27	Border	Cradock
		Report

5 May 1990	South Western Districts	19–30	SARU	Mossel Bay
		Report

5 May 1990	Stellaland	28–26	Winelands	Mafikeng
		Report

12 May 1990	Northern Natal	21–19	North Western Cape	Newcastle
		Report

Bye/s: Lowveld

=== Round two ===
19 May 1990	Border	15–7	South Western Districts	Queenstown
		Report

19 May 1990	SARU	16–20	Northern Natal	Orkney

19 May 1990	North Western Cape	18–37	Stellaland	Upington
		Report

19 May 1990	Winelands	4–13	Lowveld	Worcester
		Report

Bye/s: North Eastern Cape

=== Round three ===
2 June 1990	Lowveld	23–9	North Western Cape
		Report

2 June 1990	Northern Natal	16–26	Border
		Report

2 June 1990	South Western Districts	12–10	North Eastern Cape	Oudtshoorn
		Report

2 June 1990	Stellaland	20–11	SARU
		Report

Bye/s: Winelands

=== Round four ===
16 June 1990	Border	12–9	Stellaland	East London
		Report

16 June 1990	North Eastern Cape	22–18	Northern Natal	Cradock
		Report

16 June 1990	North Western Cape	22–12	Winelands	Upington
		Report

16 June 1990	SARU	17–18	Lowveld	Boet Erasmus Stadium, Port Elizabeth
		Report

Bye/s: South Western Districts

=== Round five ===
23 June 1990	Lowveld	16–34	Border	Nelspruit
		Report

23 June 1990	Northern Natal	19–16	South Western Districts	Newcastle
		Report

23 June 1990	Stellaland	18–13	North Eastern Cape	Lichtenburg
		Report

23 June 1990	Winelands	27–19	SARU	Wellington
		Report

Bye/s: North Western Cape

=== Round six ===
30 June 1990	Border	33–10	Winelands	East London
		Report

7 July 1990	North Eastern Cape	26–13	Lowveld	Cradock
		Report

7 July 1990	South Western Districts	21–12	Stellaland	Knysna
		Report

7 July 1990	SARU	34–31	North Western Cape	Pretoria
		Report

Bye/s: Northern Natal

=== Round seven ===
3 August 1990	Lowveld	6–12	South Western Districts	Nelspruit
		Report

4 August 1990	North Western Cape	9–39	Border	Upington
		Report

4 August 1990	Stellaland	21–16	Northern Natal

4 August 1990	Winelands	13–24	North Eastern Cape	Wellington
		Report

Bye/s: SARU

=== Round eight ===
17 August 1990	South Western Districts	0–7	Winelands	Oudtshoorn
		Report

18 August 1990	Border	10–16	SARU	East London
		Report

18 August 1990	North Eastern Cape	58–9	North Western Cape	Graaff-Reinet
		Report

18 August 1990	Northern Natal	17–15	Lowveld	Newcastle
		Report

Bye/s: Stellaland

=== Round nine ===
1 September 1990	Lowveld	6–34	Stellaland
		Report

1 September 1990	North Western Cape	7–23	South Western Districts	Upington
		Report

1 September 1990	SARU	9–64	North Eastern Cape	Port Elizabeth
		Report

1 September 1990	Winelands	21–32	Northern Natal	Worcester
		Report

Bye/s: Border

=== Final ===
15 September 1990	Border	22–4	Stellaland	East London
		Report

== See also ==
- 1990 Currie Cup Division A
- 1990 Currie Cup Division B
- 1990 Lion Cup
