= 1991 Lion Cup =

Rugby union competition in South Africa

- Countries: South Africa
- Date: 24 March – 27 July 1991
- Champions: Northern Transvaal (3rd title)
- Runners-up: Natal
- Matches played: 24

The 1991 Lion Cup was the ninth edition of the Lion Cup, the premier domestic rugby union knock-out competition in South Africa.

== Teams ==
All 25 South African provincial teams took part in this competition. The semi-finalists from the 1990 Lion Cup were put into Group A and the losing quarter finalists into Group B. The remaining teams were divided geographically. Groups C and D contained nine southern teams; the four southern teams with the highest ranking were put into Group C and the other five teams into Group D (where the two lowest-ranked teams, South Western Districts and North Western Cape had to play off in a qualifying game for the Group D spot in Round One). Similarly, Groups E and F contained eight northern teams; the four northern teams with the highest ranking were put into Group E and the other four teams into Group F:

1991 Lion Cup teams
Group	Ranking	Team
Group A	1	Northern Transvaal
Group A	2	Western Province
Group A	3	Transvaal
Group A	4	Natal
Group B	5	Far North
Group B	6	Western Transvaal
Group B	7	Eastern Province
Group B	8	Free State
Group C	9	Northern Free State
Group C	11	Western Province League
Group C	12	Griqualand West
Group C	13	North Eastern Cape
Group D	14	Boland
Group D	21	Winelands
Group D	22	Border
Group D	24	South Western Districts
Group D	25	North Western Cape
Group E	10	Eastern Transvaal
Group E	15	Northern Natal
Group E	16	SARU
Group E	17	Vaal Triangle
Group F	18	Lowveld
Group F	19	South Eastern Transvaal
Group F	20	Eastern Free State
Group F	23	Stellaland

== Competition ==
This competition was a knock-out competition. A qualifying round was held between the two lowest-ranked teams for the Group D place in Round One. In each of the first three rounds, the lower-ranked teams would have home advantage. In Round One, the teams from Group D hosted teams from Group D, while the teams from Group F hosted teams from Group F. In Round Two, the winners of the eight Round One ties played against each other for a place in Round Three. The winners of the four Round Two matches then joined teams in Group B for Round Three, with the winning teams progressing to the quarter-finals (where they were joined by the teams from Group A), followed by Semi-finals and the Final.

== Fixtures and results ==
The fixtures were as follows:

=== Qualifying round ===
24 March 1991	North Western Cape	6–21	South Western Districts	Upington
		Report

=== Round one ===
Northern Section	6 April 1991	Eastern Free State	13–24	Eastern Transvaal	Bethlehem
			Report

Northern Section	6 April 1991	Lowveld	12–15	Northern Natal	Nelspruit
			Report

Northern Section	6 April 1991	South Eastern Transvaal	41–12	Vaal Triangle	Witbank
			Report

Northern Section	6 April 1991	Stellaland	22–18	SARU	Mafikeng
			Report

Southern Section	6 April 1991	Boland	38–24	North Eastern Cape	Wellington, Western Cape
			Report

Southern Section	6 April 1991	Border	9–4	Western Province League	East London
			Report

Southern Section	6 April 1991	South Western Districts	6–32	Northern Free State	George
			Report

Southern Section	6 April 1991	Winelands	0–39	Griqualand West	Malmesbury
			Report

Bye/s: Eastern Province, Far North, Free State, Natal, Northern Transvaal, Transvaal, Western Province, Western Transvaal

=== Round two ===
Northern Section	13 April 1991	South Eastern Transvaal	18–3	Northern Natal	Witbank
			Report

Northern Section	13 April 1991	Stellaland	32–24	Eastern Transvaal	Lichtenburg
			Report

Southern Section	13 April 1991	Border	22–25	Northern Free State	East London
			Report

Southern Section	13 April 1991	Boland	22–3	Griqualand West	Wellington
			Report

Bye/s: Eastern Province, Far North, Free State, Natal, Northern Transvaal, Transvaal, Western Province, Western Transvaal

=== Round three ===
4 May 1991	Boland	21–28	Free State	Wellington
		Report

4 May 1991	Northern Free State	27–24	Western Transvaal	Welkom
		Report

4 May 1991	South Eastern Transvaal	32–19	Far North	Witbank
		Report

4 May 1991	Stellaland	14–67	Eastern Province	Rustenburg
		Report

Bye/s: Natal, Northern Transvaal, Transvaal, Western Province

=== Quarter-finals ===
29 May 1991	Northern Transvaal	22–18	Free State	Loftus Versfeld, Pretoria
		Report

31 May 1991	Northern Free State	25–32	Natal	Welkom
		Report

31 May 1991	Transvaal	59–22	South Eastern Transvaal	Ellis Park Stadium, Johannesburg
		Report

1 June 1991	Eastern Province	27–12	Western Province	Port Elizabeth
		Report

=== Semi-finals ===
6 July 1991	Northern Transvaal	24–12	Eastern Province	Loftus Versfeld, Pretoria
		Report

6 July 1991	Transvaal	11–24	Natal	Ellis Park Stadium, Johannesburg
		Report

=== Final ===
27 July 1991	Northern Transvaal	62–6	Natal	Loftus Versfeld, Pretoria

== See also ==
- 1991 Currie Cup
- 1991 Currie Cup / Central Series
- 1991 Currie Cup Central A
- 1991 Currie Cup Central B
- 1991 Currie Cup Central / Rural Series
- 1991 Currie Cup Rural C
- 1991 Currie Cup Rural D
