= 1992 Currie Cup / Central Series =

Domestic rugby union competition

- Countries: South Africa
- Date: 3 April – 29 August 1992
- Champions: Northern Transvaal (6th title) (Percy Frames Trophy); Western Transvaal (W.V. Simkins Trophy)
- Matches played: 24

The 1992 Currie Cup / Central Series was a rugby union competition held between the teams in the 1992 Currie Cup and 1992 Currie Cup Central A competitions, the top two tiers of the premier domestic competition in South Africa. This formed part of the 54th Currie Cup season since the competition started in 1889.

== Teams ==
Location of teams in the 1992 Currie Cup / Central Series
Currie Cup teams
Currie Cup Central A teams

1992 Currie Cup / Central Series
Border
Eastern Province
Eastern Transvaal
Free State
Natal
Northern Free State
Northern Transvaal
Transvaal
Western Province
Western Transvaal

=== Changes between 1991 and 1992 seasons ===
- Following the merger of all rugby governing bodies in South Africa, Western Province League were dissolved and Border replaced them in the Currie Cup Central A.

=== Changes between 1992 and 1993 seasons ===
- None

== Competition ==
There were ten participating teams in the 1992 Currie Cup / Central Series, the six teams from the 1992 Currie Cup and the four teams from the 1992 Currie Cup Central A. These teams played the teams from the other league once over the course of the season, either at home or away. Teams received two points for a win and one point for a draw.

The Currie Cup team with the best record would win the Percy Frames Trophy, the Central A team with the best record would win the W.V. Simkins Trophy.

For the 1992 Currie Cup / Central A series, SARU introduced a handicap system, where the Currie Cup Central A sides would get a points head-start in each game. The handicaps were as follows:

1992 Currie Cup / Central A handicaps
| Team | NTv | Tvl | FSt | WPr | Ntl | EPr |
| Western Transvaal | 11 | 10 | 9 | 8 | 7 | 6 |
| Northern Free State | 12 | 11 | 10 | 9 | 8 | 7 |
| Border | 13 | 12 | 11 | 10 | 9 | 8 |
| Eastern Transvaal | 14 | 13 | 12 | 11 | 10 | 9 |

== Log ==
1992 Currie Cup / Central Series — Currie Cup teams
| Pos | Team | Pl | W | D | L | PF | PA | PD | TF | TA | Pts |
| 1 | Northern Transvaal | 4 | 4 | 0 | 0 | 255 | 84 | +171 | | | 8 |
| 2 | Natal | 4 | 4 | 0 | 0 | 190 | 50 | +140 | | | 8 |
| 3 | Western Province | 4 | 4 | 0 | 0 | 206 | 85 | +121 | | | 8 |
| 4 | Eastern Province | 4 | 4 | 0 | 0 | 105 | 69 | +36 | | | 8 |
| 5 | Transvaal | 4 | 3 | 0 | 1 | 170 | 100 | +70 | | | 6 |
| 6 | Free State | 4 | 2 | 0 | 2 | 117 | 120 | –3 | | | 4 |
1992 Currie Cup / Central Series — Currie Cup Central teams
| 1 | Western Transvaal | 6 | 1 | 0 | 5 | 141 | 202 | –61 | | | 2 |
| 2 | Border | 6 | 1 | 0 | 5 | 127 | 240 | –113 | | | 2 |
| 3 | Northern Free State | 6 | 1 | 0 | 5 | 128 | 248 | –120 | | | 2 |
| 4 | Eastern Transvaal | 6 | 0 | 0 | 6 | 112 | 353 | –241 | | | 0 |
* Legend: Pos = Position, Pl = Played, W = Won, D = Drawn, L = Lost, PF = Points for, PA = Points against, PD = Points difference, TF = Tries for, TA = Tries against, Pts = Log points Points breakdown: *2 points for a win *1 point for a draw

== Fixtures and results ==
=== Round one ===
| 3 April 1992 | Northern Free State | 33–21 | Free State | Welkom |
| | | Report |

| 3 April 1992 | Northern Transvaal | 79–14 | Eastern Transvaal | Pretoria |
| | | Report |

| 4 April 1992 | Eastern Province | 27–18 | Western Transvaal | Port Elizabeth |
| | | Report |

| 4 April 1992 | Natal | 51–12 | Border | Durban |
| | | Report |

Bye/s: Transvaal, Western Province

=== Round two ===
| 10 April 1992 | Northern Free State | 14–38 | Natal | Welkom |
| | | Report |

| 11 April 1992 | Border | 25–28 | Transvaal | East London |
| | | Report |

| 11 April 1992 | Eastern Transvaal | 16–30 | Eastern Province | Brakpan |
| | | Report |

| 11 April 1992 | Western Province | 45–24 | Western Transvaal | Newlands Stadium, Cape Town |
| | | Report |

Bye/s: Free State, Northern Transvaal

=== Round three ===
| 16 May 1992 | Eastern Province | 22–17 | Northern Free State | Port Elizabeth |
| | | Report |

| 16 May 1992 | Western Transvaal | 24–28 | Free State | Olën Park, Potchefstroom |
| | | Report |

Bye/s: Border, Eastern Transvaal, Natal, Northern Transvaal, Transvaal, Western Province

=== Round four ===
| 29 May 1992 | Natal | 54–10 | Eastern Transvaal | Kings Park Stadium, Durban |
| | | Report |

| 30 May 1992 | Border | 15–20 | Western Province | East London |
| | | Report |

Bye/s: Eastern Province, Free State, Northern Free State, Northern Transvaal, Transvaal, Western Transvaal

=== Round five ===
| 12 June 1992 | Northern Free State | 22–36 | Transvaal | Welkom |
| | | Report |

| 13 June 1992 | Western Transvaal | 24–38 | Northern Transvaal | Olën Park, Potchefstroom |
| | | Report |

Bye/s: Border, Eastern Province, Eastern Transvaal, Free State, Natal, Western Province

=== Round six ===
| 27 June 1992 | Border | 18–26 | Eastern Province | East London |
| | | Report |

| 27 June 1992 | Free State | 41–35 | Eastern Transvaal | Bloemfontein |
| | | Report |

=== Round seven ===
| 11 July 1992 | Eastern Transvaal | 21–60 | Western Province | Bosman Stadium, Brakpan |
| | | Report |

| 11 July 1992 | Northern Transvaal | 88–29 | Border | Loftus Versfeld, Pretoria |
| | | Report |

Bye/s: Eastern Province, Free State, Natal, Northern Free State, Transvaal, Western Transvaal

=== Round eight ===
| 18 July 1992 | Free State | 27–28 | Border | Free State Stadium, Bloemfontein |
| | | Report |

Bye/s: Eastern Province, Eastern Transvaal, Natal, Northern Free State, Northern Transvaal, Transvaal, Western Province, Western Transvaal

=== Round nine ===
| 25 July 1992 | Western Province | 81–25 | Northern Free State | Newlands Stadium, Cape Town |
| | | Report |

| 25 July 1992 | Western Transvaal | 14–47 | Natal | Olën Park, Potchefstroom |
| | | Report |

Bye/s: Border, Eastern Province, Eastern Transvaal, Free State, Northern Transvaal, Transvaal

=== Round ten ===
| 19 August 1992 | Western Transvaal | 37–17 | Transvaal | Olën Park, Potchefstroom |
| | | Report |

Bye/s: Border, Eastern Province, Eastern Transvaal, Free State, Natal, Northern Free State, Northern Transvaal, Western Province

=== Round eleven ===
| 28 August 1992 | Northern Free State | 17–50 | Northern Transvaal | North West Stadium, Welkom |
| | | Report |

| 29 August 1992 | Eastern Transvaal | 16–89 | Transvaal | Brakpan |
| | | Report |

Bye/s: Border, Eastern Province, Free State, Natal, Western Province, Western Transvaal

== See also ==
- 1992 Currie Cup
- 1992 Currie Cup Central A
- 1992 Currie Cup Central B
- 1992 Currie Cup Central / Rural Series
- 1992 Currie Cup Rural A & B
- 1992 Currie Cup Rural B
- 1992 Lion Cup
