= 1991 Currie Cup Central B =

Domestic rugby union competition

- Countries: South Africa
- Date: 26 April – 7 September 1991
- Champions: Border
- Runners-up: Boland
- Promoted: Border
- Matches played: 30

The 1991 Currie Cup Central B was the third division of the Currie Cup competition, the premier domestic rugby union competition in South Africa. This was the 53rd season since the competition started in 1889.

== Teams ==
Location of teams in 1991 Currie Cup Central B

1991 Currie Cup Central B
Boland
Border
Far North
Griqualand West
South Eastern Transvaal
Vaal Triangle

=== Changes between 1990 and 1991 seasons ===
- The 1990 season was the last edition of the Currie Cup Division B. Instead, the second tier was changed to a Currie Cup Central Division, which had a four-team Division A and a four-team Division B.
- Boland, Far North, Griqualand West, South Eastern Transvaal and Vaal Triangle moved from the 1990 Currie Cup Division B to the Central B Division.
- Border were promoted from the 1990 Santam Bank Trophy to the Central B Division.

=== Changes between 1991 and 1992 seasons ===
- Eastern Transvaal were initially relegated from 1991 Currie Cup Central A to 1992 Currie Cup Central B. However, following the merger of all rugby governing bodies in South Africa, Western Province League were dissolved and Eastern Transvaal retained their place in Currie Cup Central A. Currie Cup Central B was reduced to five teams for 1992.
- Border were promoted from the Central B to 1992 Currie Cup Central A.

== Competition ==
There were six participating teams in the 1991 Currie Cup Central B competition. These teams played each other twice over the course of the season, once at home and once away. Teams received two points for a win and one point for a draw. The winner of the Central B competition played off against the winner of the Central A competition for the Bankfin Cup.

In addition, all the Currie Cup Central B teams also played in the 1991 Currie Cup Central / Rural Series.

== Log ==
1991 Currie Cup Central B
Pos	Team	Pl	W	D	L	PF	PA	PD	TF	TA	Pts
1	Border	10	8	0	2	208	143	+65	23	13	16
2	Boland	10	8	0	2	192	157	+35	25	19	16
3	Vaal Triangle	10	5	0	5	156	152	+4	19	10	10
4	South Eastern Transvaal	10	4	0	6	167	172	–5	15	17	8
5	Griqualand West	10	4	0	6	135	149	–14	13	19	8
6	Far North	10	1	0	9	147	232	–85	8	24	2
Border qualified to the Bankfin Cup final. * Legend: Pos = Position, Pl = Played, W = Won, D = Drawn, L = Lost, PF = Points for, PA = Points against, PD = Points difference, TF = Tries for, TA = Tries against, Pts = Log points Points breakdown: *2 points for a win *1 point for a draw

== Fixtures and results ==
=== Round one ===
26 April 1991	Vaal Triangle	21–15	Boland	Sasolburg
		Report

27 April 1991	Border	14–7	Griqualand West	East London
		Report

27 April 1991	South Eastern Transvaal	19–18	Far North	Witbank
		Report

=== Round two ===
11 May 1991	Far North	12–24	Border	Pietersburg
		Report

11 May 1991	Griqualand West	6–16	Vaal Triangle	Kimberley
		Report

Bye/s: Boland, South Eastern Transvaal

=== Round three ===
18 May 1991	Boland	29–19	Griqualand West	Kimberley
		Report

18 May 1991	Border	13–22	South Eastern Transvaal
		Report

18 May 1991	Vaal Triangle	15–9	Far North
		Report

=== Round four ===
8 June 1991	Far North	15–26	Boland	Pietersburg
		Report

8 June 1991	South Eastern Transvaal	15–13	Vaal Triangle
		Report

Bye/s: Border, Griqualand West

=== Round five ===
14 June 1991	Boland	21–16	South Eastern Transvaal	Wellington
		Report

15 June 1991	Griqualand West	9–10	Far North	Kimberley
		Report

15 June 1991	Vaal Triangle	25–32	Border	Sasolburg
		Report

=== Round six ===
22 June 1991	Border	29–12	Boland	East London
		Report

22 June 1991	South Eastern Transvaal	15–18	Griqualand West
		Report

Bye/s: Far North, Vaal Triangle

=== Round seven ===
6 July 1991	Boland	6–4	Vaal Triangle	Wellington
		Report

6 July 1991	Far North	15–34	South Eastern Transvaal
		Report

6 July 1991	Griqualand West	9–18	Border	Kimberley
		Report

=== Round eight ===
19 July 1991	Far North	16–25	Vaal Triangle	Pietersburg
		Report

Bye/s: Boland, Border, Griqualand West, South Eastern Transvaal

=== Round nine ===
3 August 1991	Border	23–13	Far North
		Report

3 August 1991	Vaal Triangle	10–12	Griqualand West
		Report

Bye/s: Boland, South Eastern Transvaal

=== Round ten ===
9 August 1991	South Eastern Transvaal	15–23	Border	Witbank
		Report

10 August 1991	Boland	18–11	Griqualand West	Wellington
		Report

Bye/s: Far North, Vaal Triangle

=== Round eleven ===
23 August 1991	Vaal Triangle	16–15	South Eastern Transvaal	Sasolburg
		Report

24 August 1991	Boland	26–24	Far North	Wellington
		Report

Bye/s: Border, Griqualand West

=== Round twelve ===
30 August 1991	South Eastern Transvaal	12–22	Boland	Witbank
		Report

31 August 1991	Border	26–11	Vaal Triangle	East London
		Report

31 August 1991	Far North	15–31	Griqualand West	Pietersburg
		Report

=== Round thirteen ===
7 September 1991	Boland	17–6	Border	Wellington
		Report

7 September 1991	Griqualand West	13–4	South Eastern Transvaal	Kimberley
		Report

Bye/s: Far North, Vaal Triangle

=== Final ===
The winner of the Central B competition played off against the winner of the Central A competition for the Bankfin Cup.

28 September 1991	Western Transvaal	15–15	Border	Olën Park, Potchefstroom
		Report

- The Bankfin Cup was shared between Border and Western Transvaal.

== Promotion play-offs ==
As a result of the play-offs, Border were promoted to the 1992 Currie Cup Central A competition, while Eastern Transvaal were relegated to the 1992 Currie Cup Central B competition.

4 October 1991	Eastern Transvaal	24–25	Border	Brakpan
		Report

10 October 1991	Border	19–10	Eastern Transvaal	East London, Eastern Cape
		Report

== See also ==
- 1991 Currie Cup
- 1991 Currie Cup / Central Series
- 1991 Currie Cup Central A
- 1991 Currie Cup Central / Rural Series
- 1991 Currie Cup Rural C
- 1991 Currie Cup Rural D
- 1991 Lion Cup
