= 1991 Currie Cup Rural C =

Domestic rugby union competition

- Countries: South Africa
- Date: 27 April – 31 August 1991
- Champions: Eastern Free State
- Runners-up: Stellaland
- Relegated: None
- Matches played: 12

The 1991 Currie Cup Rural C was the fourth division of the Currie Cup competition, the premier domestic rugby union competition in South Africa. This was the 53rd season since the competition started in 1889.

== Teams ==
Location of teams in 1990 Currie Cup Rural C

1991 Currie Cup Rural C
Eastern Free State
North Eastern Cape
Northern Natal
Stellaland

=== Changes between 1990 and 1991 seasons ===
- The 1990 season was the last edition of the Santam Bank Trophy. Instead, these teams were included in a Currie Cup Rural Division, which had a four-team Division C and a five-team Division D.
- Eastern Free State were relegated from 1990 Currie Cup Division B to the 1991 Currie Cup Rural C.
- North Eastern Cape, Northern Natal and Stellaland moved to the 1991 Currie Cup Rural C.

=== Changes between 1991 and 1992 seasons ===
- The Currie Cup Rural C was renamed Currie Cup Rural A for 1992.

== Competition ==
There were four participating teams in the 1991 Currie Cup Rural C competition. These teams played each other twice over the course of the season, once at home and once away. Teams received two points for a win and one point for a draw. The winner of the Rural C competition played off against the winner of the Rural D competition for the Bankfin Trophy.

In addition, all the Currie Cup Rural C teams also played in the 1991 Currie Cup Central / Rural Series.

== Log ==
1991 Currie Cup Rural C
Pos	Team	Pl	W	D	L	PF	PA	PD	TF	TA	Pts
1	Eastern Free State	6	6	0	0	150	90	+60	14	11	12
2	Stellaland	6	3	0	3	147	111	+36	21	9	6
3	Northern Natal	6	2	0	4	81	107	–26	5	10	4
4	North Eastern Cape	6	1	0	5	83	153	–70	9	19	2
Eastern Free State qualified to the Bankfin Trophy final. * Legend: Pos = Position, Pl = Played, W = Won, D = Drawn, L = Lost, PF = Points for, PA = Points against, PD = Points difference, TF = Tries for, TA = Tries against, Pts = Log points Points breakdown: *2 points for a win *1 point for a draw

== Fixtures and results ==
=== Round one ===
27 April 1991	Eastern Free State	28–16	Stellaland	Bethlehem
		Report

27 April 1991	North Eastern Cape	21–15	Northern Natal	Cradock
		Report

=== Round two ===
18 May 1991	Northern Natal	13–28	Eastern Free State	Newcastle
		Report

18 May 1991	Stellaland	44–10	North Eastern Cape	Lichtenburg
		Report

=== Round three ===
15 June 1991	Eastern Free State	25–9	North Eastern Cape	Bethlehem
		Report

15 June 1991	Stellaland	30–9	Northern Natal	Schweizer-Reneke
		Report

=== Round four ===
6 July 1991	Northern Natal	17–10	North Eastern Cape	Newcastle
		Report

6 July 1991	Stellaland	23–33	Eastern Free State	Delareyville
		Report

=== Round five ===
10 August 1991	Eastern Free State	15–12	Northern Natal	Bethlehem
		Report

10 August 1991	North Eastern Cape	16–31	Stellaland	Cradock
		Report

=== Round six ===
31 August 1991	North Eastern Cape	17–21	Eastern Free State	Cradock
		Report

31 August 1991	Northern Natal	15–3	Stellaland	Newcastle
		Report

=== Final ===
The winner of the Rural C competition played off against the winner of the Rural D competition for the Bankfin Trophy.

21 September 1991	Eastern Free State	47–22	Lowveld	Bethlehem
		Report

== Relegation play-off ==
In the play-off match, North Eastern Cape beat Lowveld to clinch a spot in the 1992 Currie Cup Rural A, while Lowveld would play in the 1992 Currie Cup Rural B.

28 September 1991	North Eastern Cape	37–29	Lowveld	Graaff-Reinet
		Report

== See also ==
- 1991 Currie Cup
- 1991 Currie Cup / Central Series
- 1991 Currie Cup Central A
- 1991 Currie Cup Central B
- 1991 Currie Cup Central / Rural Series
- 1991 Currie Cup Rural D
- 1991 Lion Cup
