= 1991 Northern Transvaal Currie Cup season =

Rugby union competition season

1991 Currie Cup Division A
- Countries: South Africa
- Date: 27 April – 5 October 1991
- Champions: Northern Transvaal (17th title)
- Runners-up: Transvaal

The Northern Transvaal rugby union team competed in the 1991 Currie Cup tournament in South Africa. The season resulted in a three way tie for second position, each team with 12 points. A playoff was held to determine which team would compete in the finals, with Northern Transvaal winning. They then defeated Transvaal in the final with a score of 27-15.

== Northern Transvaal results in the 1991 Currie cup ==
1991 Northern Transvaal results
| game № | Northern Transvaal points | Opponent points | Opponent | date | Venue | Result | Match notes |
|---|---|---|---|---|---|---|---|
| 1 | 31 | 22 | Free State | 27 April 1991 | Loftus Versfeld, Pretoria | Northern Transvaal won | |
| 2 | 15 | 54 | Natal | 11 May 1991 | Kings Park Stadium, Durban | Northern Transvaal lost | |
| 3 | 9 | 24 | Transvaal | 18 May 1991 | Loftus Versfeld, Pretoria | Northern Transvaal lost | |
| 4 | 21 | 12 | Eastern Province | 8 June 1991 | Boet Erasmus Stadium, Port Elizabeth | Northern Transvaal won | |
| 5 | 26 | 24 | Western Province | 15 June 1991 | Loftus Versfeld, Pretoria | Northern Transvaal won | |
| 6 | 12 | 16 | Free State | 3 August 1991 | Free State Stadium, Bloemfontein | Northern Transvaal lost | |
| 7 | 12 | 22 | Natal | 17 August 1991 | Loftus Versfeld, Pretoria | Northern Transvaal lost | |
| 8 | 35 | 12 | Transvaal | 24 August 1991 | Ellis Park Stadium, Johannesburg | Northern Transvaal won | |
| 9 | 25 | 13 | Eastern Province | 7 September 1991 | Loftus Versfeld, Pretoria | Northern Transvaal won | |
| 10 | 28 | 9 | Western Province | 14 September 1991 | Newlands Stadium, Cape Town | Northern Transvaal won | |
| 11 | 34 | 21 | Western Province | 25 September 1991 | Loftus Versfeld, Pretoria | Northern Transvaal won | Quarter Final |
| 12 | 27 | 23 | Free State | 28 September 1991 | Bloemfontein | Northern Transvaal won | Semi-Final |
| 13 | 27 | 15 | Transvaal | 5 October 1991 | Loftus Versfeld, Pretoria | Northern Transvaal won | 1991 Currie Cup Final |

== Statistics ==
=== 1991 Currie cup log position ===
1991 Currie Cup
| Pos | Team | Pl | W | D | L | PF | PA | PD | TF | TA | Pts |
| 3rd | Northern Transvaal | 10 | 6 | 0 | 4 | 214 | 208 | +6 | 22 | 18 | 12 |

=== 1988 - 1991 results summary (including play off matches) ===
| Period | Games | Won | Drawn | Lost | Win % | Points for | Average PF | Points against | 40-49 pts | 50-99 pts | 100+ pts | Best score | Worst score against |
|---|---|---|---|---|---|---|---|---|---|---|---|---|---|
| 1988–1991 | 56 | 47 | 2 | 7 | 83.93% | 1630 | 29.11 | 900 | 5 | 5 | 0 | 71-3 vs South West Africa (1989) | 54-15 vs Natal (1991) |
