= 1990 Northern Transvaal Currie Cup season =

Rugby union competition season

1990 Currie Cup Division A
- Countries: South Africa
- Date: 4 May – 6 October 1990
- Champions: Natal (1st title)
- Runners-up: Northern Transvaal

The Northern Transvaal rugby union team competed in the 1990 Currie Cup tournament in South Africa. The team competed in the finals with Natal winning with a score of 18–12.

== Northern Transvaal results in the 1990 Currie cup ==
1990 Northern Transvaal results
| game No. | Northern Transvaal points | Opponent points | Opponent | date | Venue | Result | Match notes |
|---|---|---|---|---|---|---|---|
| 1 | 42 | 9 | Northern Free State | 4 May 1990 | Loftus Versfeld, Pretoria | Northern Transvaal won | |
| 2 | 43 | 13 | Western Transvaal | 12 May 1990 | Olën Park, Potchefstroom | Northern Transvaal won | |
| 3 | 12 | 13 | Eastern Province | 19 May 1990 | Port Elizabeth | Northern Transvaal lost | |
| 4 | 25 | 12 | Western Province | 26 May 1990 | Loftus Versfeld, Pretoria | Northern Transvaal won | |
| 5 | 39 | 21 | Free State | 8 June 1990 | Free State Stadium | Northern Transvaal won | |
| 6 | 21 | 18 | Transvaal | 16 June 1990 | Loftus Versfeld, Pretoria | Northern Transvaal won | |
| 7 | 24 | 9 | Natal | 23 June 1990 | Durban | Northern Transvaal won | |
| 8 | 33 | 27 | Northern Free State | 4 August 1990 | Welkom | Northern Transvaal won | |
| 9 | 64 | 6 | Western Transvaal | 17 August 1990 | Loftus Versfeld, Pretoria | Northern Transvaal won | |
| 10 | 18 | 13 | Eastern Province | 25 August 1990 | Loftus Versfeld, Pretoria | Northern Transvaal won | |
| 11 | 17 | 12 | Western Province | 1 September 1990 | Newlands Stadium, Cape Town | Northern Transvaal won | |
| 12 | 21 | 21 | Free State | 8 September 1990 | Loftus Versfeld, Pretoria | Match drawn | |
| 13 | 36 | 18 | Transvaal | 15 September 1990 | Ellis Park Stadium, Johannesburg | Northern Transvaal won | |
| 14 | 28 | 6 | Natal | 22 September 1990 | Loftus Versfeld, Pretoria | Northern Transvaal won | |
| 15 | 12 | 18 | Natal | 6 October 1990 | Loftus Versfeld, Pretoria | Northern Transvaal lost | 1990 Currie Cup final |

== Statistics ==
=== 1990 Currie cup log position ===
1990 Currie Cup Division A Log
| Pos | Team | Pl | W | D | L | PF | PA | PD | TF | TA | Pts |
| 1st | Northern Transvaal | 14 | 12 | 1 | 1 | 423 | 198 | +225 | 55 | 14 | 25 |

=== 1988 - 1990 results summary (including play off matches) ===
| Period | Games | Won | Drawn | Lost | Win % | Points for | Average PF | Points against | 40-49 pts | 50-99 pts | 100+ pts | Best score | Worst score against |
|---|---|---|---|---|---|---|---|---|---|---|---|---|---|
| 1988–1990 | 43 | 38 | 2 | 3 | 88.37% | 1328 | 30.88 | 633 | 5 | 5 | 0 | 71-3 vs South West Africa (1989) | 27-33 vs Northern Free State (1990) |
