= 1992 Northern Transvaal Currie Cup season =

Rugby union competition season

1992 Currie Cup
- Countries: South Africa
- Date: 2 May – 12 September 1992
- Champions: Natal (2nd title)
- Runners-up: Transvaal

The Northern Transvaal rugby union team competed in the 1992 Currie Cup tournament in South Africa. The team came in 3rd out of 6 teams.

== Northern Transvaal results in the 1992 Currie cup ==
1992 Northern Transvaal results
game No.	Northern Transvaal points	Opponent points	Opponent	date	Venue	Result	Match notes
1	14	22	Free State	2 May 1992	Free State Stadium, Bloemfontein	Northern Transvaal lost	
2	27	24	Natal	16 May 1992	Loftus Versfeld, Pretoria	Northern Transvaal won	
3	20	41	Transvaal	23 May 1992	Ellis Park Stadium, Johannesburg	Northern Transvaal lost	
4	24	9	Eastern Province	30 May 1992	Pretoria	Northern Transvaal won	
5	14	15	Western Province	6 June 1992	Newlands Stadium, Cape Town	Northern Transvaal lost	
6	39	16	Free State	20 June 1992	Loftus Versfeld, Pretoria	Northern Transvaal won	
7	12	17	Natal	27 June 1992	Kings Park Stadium, Durban	Northern Transvaal lost	
8	36	28	Transvaal	24 August 1992	Loftus Versfeld, Pretoria	Northern Transvaal won	
9	33	13	Eastern Province	25 July 1992	Boet Erasmus Stadium, Port Elizabeth	Northern Transvaal won	
10	23	33	Western Province	1 August 1992	Loftus Versfeld, Pretoria	Northern Transvaal lost	

- Northern Transvaal did not qualify for the 1992 Currie Cup final.

== Statistics ==
=== 1992 Currie cup log position ===
1992 Currie Cup
Pos	Team	Pl	W	D	L	PF	PA	PD	TF	TA	Pts
3rd	Northern Transvaal	10	5	0	5	242	218	+24	18	17	10

=== 1988 - 1992 results summary (including play off matches) ===
Period	Games	Won	Drawn	Lost	Win %	Points for	Average PF	Points against	40-49 pts	50-99 pts	100+ pts	Best score	Worst score against
1988–1992	66	52	2	12	78.78%	1872	28.36	1118	5	5	0	71-3 vs South West Africa (1989)	54-15 vs Natal (1991)
