= 1991 Currie Cup / Central Series =

Domestic rugby union competition

- Countries: South Africa
- Date: 11 May – 28 September 1991
- Champions: Northern Transvaal (5th title) (Percy Frames Trophy); Western Transvaal (W.V. Simkins Trophy)
- Matches played: 24

The 1991 Currie Cup / Central Series was a rugby union competition held between the teams in 1991 Currie Cup and 1991 Currie Cup Central A competitions, the top two tiers of the premier domestic competition in South Africa. This formed part of the 53rd Currie Cup season since the competition started in 1889.

== Teams ==
Location of teams in the 1991 Currie Cup / Central Series
Currie Cup teams
Currie Cup Central A teams

1991 Currie Cup / Central Series
Eastern Province
Eastern Transvaal
Free State
Natal
Northern Free State
Northern Transvaal
Transvaal
Western Province
Western Province League
Western Transvaal

== Competition ==
There were ten participating teams in the 1991 Currie Cup / Central Series, the six teams from the 1991 Currie Cup and the four teams from the 1991 Currie Cup Central A. These teams played the teams from the other league once over the course of the season, either at home or away. Teams received two points for a win and one point for a draw.

The Currie Cup team with the best record would win the Percy Frames Trophy, the Central A team with the best record would win the W.V. Simkins Trophy.

== Log ==
1991 Currie Cup / Central Series — Currie Cup teams
Pos	Team	Pl	W	D	L	PF	PA	PD	TF	TA	Pts
1	Northern Transvaal	4	4	0	0	205	53	+152	36	6	8
2	Eastern Province	4	4	0	0	181	37	+144	37	26	8
3	Transvaal	4	4	0	0	161	57	+104	27	5	8
4	Free State	4	4	0	0	148	50	+98	50	21	8
5	Western Province	4	4	0	0	155	64	+91	64	21	8
6	Natal	4	4	0	0	106	59	+47	12	5	8
1991 Currie Cup / Central Series — Currie Cup Central teams
1	Western Transvaal	6	0	0	6	99	211	–112	14	32	0
2	Western Province League	6	0	0	6	84	217	–133	11	35	0
3	Northern Free State	6	0	0	6	67	228	–161	2	31	0
4	Eastern Transvaal	6	0	0	6	70	300	–230	4	45	0
* Legend: Pos = Position, Pl = Played, W = Won, D = Drawn, L = Lost, PF = Points for, PA = Points against, PD = Points difference, TF = Tries for, TA = Tries against, Pts = Log points Points breakdown: *2 points for a win *1 point for a draw

== Fixtures and results ==
=== Round one ===
19 March 1991	Transvaal	58–3	Eastern Transvaal	Ellis Park Stadium, Johannesburg
		Report

Bye/s: Eastern Province, Free State, Natal, Northern Free State, Northern Transvaal, Western Province, Western Province League, Western Transvaal

=== Round two ===
10 May 1991	Northern Free State	6–38	Eastern Province	Welkom
		Report

11 May 1991	Free State	44–17	Western Transvaal	Free State Stadium, Bloemfontein
		Report

Bye/s: Eastern Transvaal, Natal, Northern Transvaal, Transvaal, Western Province, Western Province League

=== Round three ===
25 May 1991	Eastern Province	42–13	Western Province League	Boet Erasmus Stadium, Port Elizabeth
		Report

25 May 1991	Eastern Transvaal	15–25	Free State	Bosman Stadium, Brakpan
		Report

25 May 1991	Natal	25–18	Northern Free State	Kings Park Stadium, Durban
		Report

25 May 1991	Western Province	24–18	Western Transvaal
		Report

Bye/s: Northern Transvaal, Transvaal

=== Round four ===
8 June 1991	Western Province League	10–22	Natal	Paarl
		Report

8 June 1991	Western Province	54–15	Eastern Transvaal	Newlands Stadium, Cape Town
		Report

Bye/s: Eastern Province, Free State, Northern Free State, Northern Transvaal, Transvaal, Western Transvaal

=== Round five ===
21 June 1991	Northern Transvaal	57–15	Western Transvaal	Loftus Versfeld, Pretoria
		Report

22 June 1991	Northern Free State	12–28	Transvaal	Welkom
		Report

Bye/s: Eastern Province, Eastern Transvaal, Free State, Natal, Western Province, Western Province League

=== Round six ===
29 June 1991	Eastern Transvaal	18–24	Natal
		Report

29 June 1991	Free State	45–15	Northern Free State
		Report

29 June 1991	Western Province League	16–33	Northern Transvaal	Newlands Stadium, Cape Town
		Report

29 June 1991	Western Transvaal	12–19	Eastern Province
		Report

Bye/s: Transvaal, Western Province

=== Round seven ===
17 August 1991	Western Province League	3–34	Free State	Paarl
		Report

17 August 1991	Eastern Province	82–6	Eastern Transvaal	Boet Erasmus Stadium, Port Elizabeth
		Report

Bye/s: Natal, Northern Free State, Northern Transvaal, Transvaal, Western Province, Western Transvaal

=== Round eight ===
31 August 1991	Eastern Transvaal	13–57	Northern Transvaal	Bosman Stadium, Brakpan
		Report

31 August 1991	Western Transvaal	24–32	Transvaal	Olën Park, Potchefstroom
		Report

31 August 1991	Western Province	43–24	Western Province League	Newlands Stadium, Cape Town
		Report

Bye/s: Eastern Province, Free State, Natal, Northern Free State

=== Round nine ===
6 September 1991	Natal	35–13	Western Transvaal	Durban
		Report

7 September 1991	Northern Free State	7–34	Western Province	Newlands Stadium, Cape Town
		Report

Bye/s: Eastern Province, Eastern Transvaal, Free State, Northern Transvaal, Transvaal, Western Province League

=== Round ten ===
20 September 1991	Northern Transvaal	58–9	Northern Free State	Loftus Versfeld, Pretoria
		Report

20 September 1991	Transvaal	43–18	Western Province League	Ellis Park Stadium, Johannesburg
		Report

Bye/s: Eastern Province, Eastern Transvaal, Free State, Natal, Western Province, Western Transvaal

== See also ==
- 1991 Currie Cup
- 1991 Currie Cup Central A
- 1991 Currie Cup Central B
- 1991 Currie Cup Central / Rural Series
- 1991 Currie Cup Rural C
- 1991 Currie Cup Rural D
- 1991 Lion Cup
