= 1992 Currie Cup Central / Rural Series =

Domestic rugby union competition

1992 Currie Cup / Central Series
- Countries: South Africa
- Date: 10 April – 1 August 1992
- Champions: Boland; Eastern Free State
- Matches played: 20

The 1992 Currie Cup Central / Rural Series was a rugby union competition held between the teams in the 1992 Currie Cup Central B and 1992 Currie Cup Rural A competitions, the third and fourth tiers of the premier domestic competition in South Africa. This formed part of the 54th Currie Cup season since the competition started in 1889.

== Teams ==
Location of teams in the 1992 Currie Cup Central / Rural Series
Currie Cup Central B teams
Currie Cup Rural C teams

1992 Currie Cup Central / Rural Series
Boland
Eastern Free State
Far North
Griqualand West
North Eastern Cape
Northern Natal
South Eastern Transvaal
Stellaland
Vaal Triangle

== Competition ==
There were nine participating teams in the 1992 Currie Cup Central / Rural Series, the five teams from the 1992 Currie Cup Central B competition and the four teams from the 1992 Currie Cup Rural A competition. These teams played the teams from the other league once over the course of the season, either at home or away. Teams received two points for a win and one point for a draw.

== Log ==
1992 Currie Cup Central / Rural Series — Currie Cup Central B teams
Pos	Team	Pl	W	D	L	PF	PA	PD	TF	TA	Pts
1	Boland	4	3	0	1	86	42	+44			6
2	Griqualand West	4	3	0	1	78	62	+16			6
3	Far North	4	2	1	1	98	73	+25			5
4	Vaal Triangle	4	2	1	1	107	85	+22			5
5	South Eastern Transvaal	4	2	1	1	87	72	+15			5
1992 Currie Cup Central / Rural Series — Currie Cup Rural A teams
1	Eastern Free State	5	4	0	1	134	106	+28			8
2	Stellaland	5	1	1	3	84	111	–27			3
3	North Eastern Cape	5	0	1	4	69	99	–30			1
4	Northern Natal	5	0	1	4	47	140	–93			1
* Legend: Pos = Position, Pl = Played, W = Won, D = Drawn, L = Lost, PF = Points for, PA = Points against, PD = Points difference, TF = Tries for, TA = Tries against, Pts = Log points Points breakdown: *2 points for a win *1 point for a draw

== Fixtures and results ==
=== Round one ===
10 April 1992	South Eastern Transvaal	21–21	Stellaland	Witbank
		Report

11 April 1992	Eastern Free State	30–21	Boland	Bethlehem
		Report

11 April 1992	Northern Natal	9–9	Far North	Ladysmith
		Report

Bye/s: Griqualand West, North Eastern Cape, Vaal Triangle

=== Round two ===
16 May 1992	North Eastern Cape	19–23	South Eastern Transvaal	Aliwal North
		Report

16 May 1992	Stellaland	10–20	Griqualand West	Vryburg
		Report

Bye/s: Boland, Eastern Free State, Far North, Northern Natal, Vaal Triangle

=== Round three ===
23 May 1992	Griqualand West	19–12	North Eastern Cape
		Report

Bye/s: Boland, Eastern Free State, Far North, Northern Natal, South Eastern Transvaal, Stellaland, Vaal Triangle

=== Round four ===
5 June 1992	Boland	28–9	Northern Natal	Boland Stadium, Wellington
		Report

6 June 1992	Eastern Free State	39–11	Vaal Triangle	Bethlehem
		Report

6 June 1992	Far North	28–35	Stellaland	Pietersburg
		Report

Bye/s: Griqualand West, North Eastern Cape, South Eastern Transvaal

=== Round five ===
13 June 1992	Northern Natal	9–18	Griqualand West	Newcastle
		Report

Bye/s: Boland, Eastern Free State, Far North, North Eastern Cape, South Eastern Transvaal, Stellaland, Vaal Triangle

=== Round six ===
20 June 1992	Boland	19–3	North Eastern Cape	Wellington
		Report

20 June 1992	Northern Natal	7–28	South Eastern Transvaal	Newcastle
		Report

Bye/s: Eastern Free State, Far North, Griqualand West, Stellaland, Vaal Triangle

=== Round seven ===
4 July 1992	Vaal Triangle	57–13	Northern Natal	Westonaria
		Report

4 July 1992	Far North	38–9	Eastern Free State	Phalaborwa
		Report

Bye/s: Boland, Griqualand West, North Eastern Cape, South Eastern Transvaal, Stellaland

=== Round eight ===
10 July 1992	Stellaland	0–18	Boland	Lichtenburg
		Report

11 July 1992	Eastern Free State	31–21	Griqualand West	Bethlehem
		Report

Bye/s: Far North, North Eastern Cape, Northern Natal, South Eastern Transvaal, Vaal Triangle

=== Round nine ===
17 July 1992	Vaal Triangle	15–15	North Eastern Cape	Vereeniging
		Report

18 July 1992	South Eastern Transvaal	15–25	Eastern Free State	Groblersdal
		Report

Bye/s: Boland, Far North, Griqualand West, Northern Natal, Stellaland

=== Round ten ===
31 July 1992	Stellaland	18–24	Vaal Triangle	Rustenburg
		Report

1 August 1992	North Eastern Cape	20–23	Far North
		Report

Bye/s: Boland, Eastern Free State, Griqualand West, Northern Natal, South Eastern Transvaal

== See also ==
- 1992 Currie Cup
- 1992 Currie Cup / Central Series
- 1992 Currie Cup Central A
- 1992 Currie Cup Central B
- 1992 Currie Cup Rural A & B
- 1992 Currie Cup Rural B
- 1992 Lion Cup
