= 1992 Currie Cup Central A =

Domestic rugby union competition

- Countries: South Africa
- Date: 2 May – 5 September 1992
- Champions: Western Transvaal
- Runners-up: Border
- Matches played: 12

The 1992 Currie Cup Central A was the second division of the Currie Cup competition, the premier domestic rugby union competition in South Africa. This was the 54th season since the competition started in 1889.

== Teams ==
Location of teams in 1992 Currie Cup Division A

1992 Currie Cup Central A
Border
Eastern Transvaal
Northern Free State
Western Transvaal

=== Changes between 1991 and 1992 seasons ===
- Border were promoted from the 1991 Currie Cup Central B to the Currie Cup Central A.
- Eastern Transvaal were initially relegated from Currie Cup Central A to the 1992 Currie Cup Central B. However, following the merger of all rugby governing bodies in South Africa, Western Province League were dissolved and Eastern Transvaal retained their place in Currie Cup Central A.

=== Changes between 1992 and 1993 seasons ===
- None

== Competition ==
There were four participating teams in the 1992 Currie Cup Central A competition. These teams played each other twice over the course of the season, once at home and once away. Teams received two points for a win and one point for a draw. The winner of the Central A competition played off against the winner of the Central B competition for the Bankfin Cup.

In addition, all the Currie Cup Central A teams also played in the 1992 Currie Cup / Central Series.

== Log ==
1992 Currie Cup Central A
Pos	Team	Pld	W	D	L	PF	PA	PD	TF	TA	Pts	Qualification
1	Western Transvaal	6	4	0	2	149	96	+53	0	0	8	Bankfin Cup final
2	Border	6	4	0	2	114	93	+21	0	0	8	
3	Northern Free State	6	3	0	3	143	112	+31	0	0	6	
4	Eastern Transvaal	6	1	0	5	64	169	−105	0	0	2	Relegation play-off

Rules for classification: 2 points for a win, 1 point for a draw

== Fixtures and results ==
=== Round one ===
2 May 1992	Eastern Transvaal	9–39	Northern Free State	Bosman Stadium, Brakpan
		Report

2 May 1992	Western Transvaal	12–6	Border	Olën Park, Potchefstroom
		Report

=== Round two ===
16 May 1992	Border	26–14	Eastern Transvaal	Basil Kenyon Stadium, East London
		Report

Bye/s: Northern Free State, Western Transvaal

=== Round three ===
22 May 1992	Northern Free State	19–12	Western Transvaal	Welkom
		Report

Bye/s: Border, Eastern Transvaal

=== Round four ===
5 June 1992	Eastern Transvaal	6–22	Western Transvaal	Bosman Stadium, Brakpan
		Report

6 June 1992	Border	25–19	Northern Free State	East London
		Report

=== Round five ===
19 June 1992	Western Transvaal	36–25	Northern Free State	Olën Park, Potchefstroom
		Report

20 June 1992	Eastern Transvaal	13–9	Border	Bosman Stadium, Brakpan
		Report

=== Round six ===
3 July 1992	Northern Free State	23–3	Eastern Transvaal	Welkom
		Report

Bye/s: Border, Western Transvaal

=== Round seven ===
31 July 1992	Western Transvaal	50–19	Eastern Transvaal	Olën Park, Potchefstroom
		Report

1 August 1992	Northern Free State	18–27	Border	Welkom
		Report

=== Round eight ===
29 August 1992	Border	21–17	Western Transvaal	East London
		Report

29 August 1992	Stellaland	24–15	Eastern Free State	Lichtenburg
		Report

=== Final ===
The winner of the Central A competition played off against the winner of the Central B competition for the Bankfin Cup.

5 September 1992	Western Transvaal	40–21	Boland	Potchefstroom
		Report

- Western Transvaal won the 1992 Bankfin Cup.

== Relegation play-offs ==
As a result of the play-offs, Eastern Transvaal remained in the Currie Cup Central A for 1993, while Boland remained in the Currie Cup Central B for 1993.

11 September 1992	Eastern Transvaal	27–9	Boland	Brakpan
		Report

== See also ==
- 1992 Currie Cup
- 1992 Currie Cup / Central Series
- 1992 Currie Cup Central B
- 1992 Currie Cup Central / Rural Series
- 1992 Currie Cup Rural A & B
- 1992 Currie Cup Rural B
- 1992 Lion Cup
