= 1990 Currie Cup Division B =

Domestic rugby union competition

- Countries: South Africa
- Date: 5 May – 29 September 1988
- Champions: Western Province League
- Runners-up: Eastern Transvaal
- Matches played: 57

The 1990 Currie Cup Division B (known as the Santam Bank Currie Cup for sponsorship reasons) was the second division of the Currie Cup competition, the 51st season in the since it started in 1889.

== Teams ==
Location of teams in 1990 Currie Cup Division B

1990 Currie Cup Division B
Boland
Eastern Free State
Eastern Transvaal
Far North
Griqualand West
South Eastern Transvaal
Vaal Triangle
Western Province League

=== Changes between 1989 and 1990 seasons ===
- Division B was expanded from six to eight teams.
- Western Transvaal were promoted to Division A.
- Boland, Far North and Western Province League were promoted from the Santam Bank Trophy Division A.

=== Changes between 1990 and 1991 seasons ===
- The 1990 season was the last edition of the Currie Cup Division B. Instead, the second tier was changed to a Currie Cup Central Division, which had a four-team Division A and a four-team Division B.
- Northern Free State and Western Transvaal were relegated from the 1990 Currie Cup Division A to the 1991 Currie Cup Central A.
- Eastern Transvaal and Western Province League moved to the 1991 Currie Cup Central A.
- Boland, Far North, Griqualand West, South Eastern Transvaal and Vaal Triangle moved to the 1991 Currie Cup Central B.
- Border were promoted from the 1990 Santam Bank Trophy to the 1991 Currie Cup Central B.
- Eastern Free State were relegated from Division B to the 1991 Currie Cup Rural C.

== Competition ==
=== Regular season and title play-offs ===
There were eight participating teams in the 1990 Currie Cup Division B. These teams played each other twice over the course of the season, once at home and once away. Teams received two points for a win and one point for a draw. The top two teams qualified for the Division B finals, played at the home venue of the higher-placed team.

== Log ==
1990 Currie Cup Division B log
Pos	Team	Pld	W	D	L	PF	PA	PD	TF	TA	Pts	Qualification
1	Western Province League	14	12	0	2	324	168	+156	40	18	24	Division B final
2	Eastern Transvaal	14	10	0	4	337	219	+118	49	21	20	Division B final
3	Vaal Triangle	14	8	1	5	290	290	0	38	27	17	
4	Boland	14	8	0	6	284	207	+77	45	22	16	
5	Griqualand West	14	7	1	6	228	228	0	28	23	15	
6	Far North	14	6	1	7	220	266	−46	22	28	13	
7	South Eastern Transvaal	14	2	0	12	171	280	−109	12	45	4	
8	Eastern Free State	14	1	1	12	189	385	−196	14	54	3	Relegated to 1991 Currie Cup Rural C

== Fixtures and results ==
=== Round one ===
5 May 1990	Eastern Transvaal	24–15	Griqualand West	Springs
		Report

5 May 1990	South Eastern Transvaal	14–12	Eastern Free State	Witbank
		Report

5 May 1990	Vaal Triangle	27–15	Far North	Sasolburg
		Report

5 May 1990	Boland	3–12	Western Province League	Wellington
		Report

=== Round two ===
11 May 1990	Far North	27–6	South Eastern Transvaal	Pietersburg

12 May 1990	Eastern Free State	12–15	Boland	Bethlehem
		Report

12 May 1990	Griqualand West	17–30	Vaal Triangle	Kimberley

12 May 1990	Western Province League	34–7	Eastern Transvaal	Paarl
		Report

=== Round three ===
19 May 1990	Far North	7–16	Boland	Pietersburg
		Report

19 May 1990	South Eastern Transvaal	3–9	Griqualand West	Witbank
		Report

19 May 1990	Vaal Triangle	9–33	Eastern Transvaal	Sasolburg

19 May 1990	Western Province League	45–16	Eastern Free State	Newlands Stadium, Cape Town
		Report

=== Round four ===
2 June 1990	Eastern Transvaal	24–9	South Eastern Transvaal	Springs
		Report

2 June 1990	Far North	13–9	Eastern Free State
		Report

2 June 1990	Griqualand West	16–9	Boland	Kimberley
		Report

2 June 1990	Vaal Triangle	18–25	Western Province League	Sasolburg
		Report

=== Round five ===
9 June 1990	Boland	20–6	Eastern Transvaal	Wellington
		Report

9 June 1990	Eastern Free State	16–9	Griqualand West	Bethlehem
		Report

9 June 1990	South Eastern Transvaal	6–24	Vaal Triangle	Witbank
		Report

9 June 1990	Western Province League	28–0	Far North	Elsie's River
		Report

=== Round six ===
16 June 1990	Griqualand West	18–18	Far North	Kimberley
		Report

16 June 1990	Eastern Transvaal	44–12	Eastern Free State	Springs
		Report

16 June 1990	Vaal Triangle	21–20	Boland	Sasolburg
		Report

16 June 1990	Western Province League	10–3	South Eastern Transvaal	Elsie's River
		Report

=== Round seven ===
23 June 1990	Boland	32–15	South Eastern Transvaal	Wellington
		Report

23 June 1990	Eastern Free State	10–32	Vaal Triangle	Bethlehem
		Report

23 June 1990	Far North	15–33	Eastern Transvaal	Pietersburg
		Report

23 June 1990	Western Province League	22–9	Griqualand West	Paarl
		Report

=== Round eight ===
30 June 1990	Eastern Free State	27–31	South Eastern Transvaal	Bethlehem
		Report

30 June 1990	Griqualand West	16–6	Eastern Transvaal	Kimberley
		ReportReport

30 June 1990	Western Province League	12–6	Boland	Paarl
		Report

Bye/s: Far North, Vaal Triangle

=== Round nine ===
3 August 1990	South Eastern Transvaal	4–15	Far North	Witbank
		Report

4 August 1990	Boland	59–9	Eastern Free State	Wellington
		Report

4 August 1990	Eastern Transvaal	25–22	Western Province League	Pam Brink Stadium, Springs
		Report

4 August 1990	Vaal Triangle	25–12	Griqualand West

=== Round ten ===
11 August 1990	Boland	6–18	Far North	Wellington
		Report

11 August 1990	Eastern Free State	19–35	Western Province League	Bethlehem
		Report

11 August 1990	Eastern Transvaal	38–6	Vaal Triangle	Springs
		Report

11 August 1990	Griqualand West	17–15	South Eastern Transvaal	Kimberley

=== Round eleven ===
17 August 1990	South Eastern Transvaal	13–20	Eastern Transvaal	Witbank
		Report

18 August 1990	Boland	19–10	Griqualand West	Wellington
		Report

18 August 1990	Far North	19–15	Eastern Free State	Pietersburg
		Report

18 August 1990	Western Province League	30–9	Vaal Triangle	Newlands Stadium, Cape Town
		Report

=== Round twelve ===
25 August 1990	Far North	15–24	Vaal Triangle	Potgietersrus
		Report

Bye/s: Boland, Eastern Free State, Eastern Transvaal, Griqualand West, South Eastern Transvaal, Western Province League

=== Round thirteen ===
1 September 1990	Eastern Transvaal	31–27	Boland	Pam Brink Stadium, Springs
		Report

1 September 1990	Far North	22–23	Western Province League	Pietersburg
		Report

1 September 1990	Griqualand West	23–13	Eastern Free State	Kimberley
		Report

1 September 1990	Vaal Triangle	26–22	South Eastern Transvaal	Sasolburg
		Report

=== Round fourteen ===
8 September 1990	Boland	31–23	Vaal Triangle	Wellington
		Report

8 September 1990	Eastern Free State	3–30	Eastern Transvaal	Bethlehem
		Report

8 September 1990	Far North	18–41	Griqualand West	Pietersburg
		Report

8 September 1990	Western Province League	16–15	South Eastern Transvaal

=== Round fifteen ===
14 September 1990	South Eastern Transvaal	15–21	Boland	Witbank
		Report

15 September 1990	Griqualand West	16–10	Western Province League	Kimberley
		Report

15 September 1990	Eastern Transvaal	16–18	Far North	Barnard Stadium, Kempton Park
		Report

15 September 1990	Vaal Triangle	16–16	Eastern Free State	Sasolburg
		Report

=== Final ===
29 September 1990	Western Province League	22–16	Eastern Transvaal	Paarl
		Report

== See also ==
- 1990 Currie Cup Division A
- 1990 Santam Bank Trophy
- 1990 Lion Cup
