= 1991 Currie Cup Central A =

Domestic rugby union competition

- Countries: South Africa
- Date: 27 April – 13 September 1991
- Champions: Western Transvaal
- Runners-up: Northern Free State
- Matches played: 12

The 1991 Currie Cup Central A was the second division of the Currie Cup competition, the premier domestic rugby union competition in South Africa. This was the 53rd season since the competition started in 1889.

== Teams ==
Location of teams in 1991 Currie Cup Division A

1991 Currie Cup Central A
Eastern Transvaal
Northern Free State
Western Province League
Western Transvaal

=== Changes between 1990 and 1991 seasons ===
- The 1990 season was the last edition of the Currie Cup Division B. Instead, the second tier was changed to a Currie Cup Central Division, which had a four-team Division A and a four-team Division B.
- Northern Free State and Western Transvaal were relegated from the 1990 Currie Cup Division A to the Central A division.
- Eastern Transvaal and Western Province League moved to the Central A division.

=== Changes between 1991 and 1992 seasons ===
- Border were promoted from the 1991 Currie Cup Central B to the 1992 Currie Cup Central A.
- Eastern Transvaal were initially relegated from Currie Cup Central A to the 1992 Currie Cup Central B. However, following the merger of all rugby governing bodies in South Africa, Western Province League were dissolved and Eastern Transvaal retained their place in Currie Cup Central A.

== Competition ==
There were four participating teams in the 1991 Currie Cup Central A competition. These teams played each other twice over the course of the season, once at home and once away. Teams received two points for a win and one point for a draw. The winner of the Central A competition played off against the winner of the Central B competition for the Bankfin Cup.

In addition, all the Currie Cup Central A teams also played in the 1991 Currie Cup / Central Series.

== Log ==
1991 Currie Cup Central A
Pos	Team	Pld	W	D	L	PF	PA	PD	TF	TA	Pts	Qualification
1	Western Transvaal	6	5	1	0	185	80	+105	28	6	11	Bankfin Cup final
2	Northern Free State	6	3	1	2	128	91	+37	11	9	7	
3	Western Province League	6	2	1	3	103	137	−34	10	17	5	Dissolved
4	Eastern Transvaal	6	0	1	5	90	198	−108	9	26	1	Relegation play-off

Rules for classification: 2 points for a win, 1 point for a draw

== Fixtures and results ==
=== Round one ===
27 April 1991	Eastern Transvaal	18–18	Western Province League	Brakpan
		Report

27 April 1991	Western Transvaal	19–15	Northern Free State	Potchefstroom
		Report

=== Round two ===
18 May 1991	Eastern Transvaal	9–47	Western Transvaal	Bosman Stadium, Brakpan
		Report

18 May 1991	Northern Free State	33–12	Western Province League	Welkom
		Report

=== Round three ===
14 June 1991	Northern Free State	27–21	Eastern Transvaal	Welkom
		Report

15 June 1991	Western Transvaal	22–11	Western Province League	Olën Park, Potchefstroom
		Report

=== Round four ===
3 August 1991	Eastern Transvaal	21–35	Western Province League
		Report

3 August 1991	Northern Free State	18–18	Western Transvaal
		Report

=== Round five ===
24 August 1991	Western Province League	9–6	Northern Free State	Newlands Stadium, Cape Town
		Report

24 August 1991	Western Transvaal	42–9	Eastern Transvaal
		Report

=== Round six ===
13 September 1991	Eastern Transvaal	12–29	Northern Free State	Brakpan
		Report

13 September 1991	Western Province League	18–37	Western Transvaal	Danie Craven Stadium, Stellenbosch
		Report

=== Final ===
The winner of the Central A competition played off against the winner of the Central B competition for the Bankfin Cup.

28 September 1991	Western Transvaal	15–15	Border	Olën Park, Potchefstroom
		Report

- The 1991 Bankfin Cup was shared between Border and Western Transvaal.

== Relegation play-offs ==
As a result of the play-offs, Border were promoted to the 1992 Currie Cup Central A competition, while Eastern Transvaal were relegated to the 1992 Currie Cup Central B competition.

4 October 1991	Eastern Transvaal	24–25	Border	Brakpan
		Report

10 October 1991	Border	19–10	Eastern Transvaal	East London, Eastern Cape
		Report

== See also ==
- 1991 Currie Cup
- 1991 Currie Cup / Central Series
- 1991 Currie Cup Central B
- 1991 Currie Cup Central / Rural Series
- 1991 Currie Cup Rural C
- 1991 Currie Cup Rural D
- 1991 Lion Cup
