= 1991 Currie Cup Rural D =

Domestic rugby union competition

- Countries: South Africa
- Date: 11 May – 14 September 1991
- Champions: Lowveld
- Runners-up: SARU
- Promoted: None
- Matches played: 20

The 1991 Currie Cup Rural D was the fifth division of the Currie Cup competition, the premier domestic rugby union competition in South Africa. This was the 53rd season since the competition started in 1889.

== Teams ==
Location of teams in 1991 Currie Cup Rural D

1991 Currie Cup Rural D
Lowveld
North Western Cape
SARU
South Western Districts
Winelands

=== Changes between 1990 and 1991 seasons ===
- The 1990 season was the last edition of the Santam Bank Trophy. Instead, these teams were included in a Currie Cup Rural Division, which had a four-team Division C and a five-team Division D.
- Lowveld, North Western Cape, SARU, South Western Districts and Winelands moved to the 1991 Currie Cup Rural D.

=== Changes between 1991 and 1992 seasons ===
- Following the merger of all rugby governing bodies in South Africa, SARA and Winelands were dissolved. Currie Cup Rural D was reduced to three teams for 1992.
- The Currie Cup Rural D was renamed Currie Cup Rural B for 1992.

== Competition ==
There were five participating teams in the 1991 Currie Cup Rural D competition. These teams played each other twice over the course of the season, once at home and once away. Teams received two points for a win and one point for a draw. The winner of the Rural D competition played off against the winner of the Rural C competition for the Bankfin Trophy.

== Log ==
1991 Currie Cup Rural D
Pos	Team	Pl	W	D	L	PF	PA	PD	TF	TA	Pts
1	Lowveld	8	7	0	1	219	125	+94	30	18	14
2	SARU	8	5	1	2	207	141	+66	32	20	11
3	South Western Districts	8	4	1	3	171	113	+58	25	14	9
4	North Western Cape	8	2	0	6	144	157	–13	22	20	4
5	Winelands	8	1	0	7	136	341	–205	19	56	2
Lowveld qualified to the Bankfin Trophy final. SARU and Winelands were dissolved following a merger between the governing bodies in South Africa. * Legend: Pos = Position, Pl = Played, W = Won, D = Drawn, L = Lost, PF = Points for, PA = Points against, PD = Points difference, TF = Tries for, TA = Tries against, Pts = Log points Points breakdown: *2 points for a win *1 point for a draw

== Fixtures and results ==
=== Round one ===
11 May 1991	SARU	21–11	North Western Cape	Johannesburg
		Report

11 May 1991	South Western Districts	15–24	Lowveld	George
		Report

Bye/s: Winelands

=== Round two ===
18 May 1991	North Western Cape	51–15	Winelands	Upington
		Report

18 May 1991	SARU	3–27	South Western Districts	Port Elizabeth
		Report

Bye/s: Lowveld

=== Round three ===
8 June 1991	Lowveld	13–41	SARU
		Report

8 June 1991	South Western Districts	58–13	Winelands
		Report

Bye/s: North Western Cape

=== Round four ===
22 June 1991	North Western Cape	6–9	South Western Districts	Upington
		Report

22 June 1991	Winelands	21–46	Lowveld	Malmesbury
		Report

Bye/s: SARU

=== Round five ===
29 June 1991	Lowveld	26–16	North Western Cape
		Report

29 June 1991	SARU	36–22	Winelands
		Report

Bye/s: South Western Districts

=== Round six ===
3 August 1991	Lowveld	10–6	South Western Districts
		Report

3 August 1991	North Western Cape	11–21	SARU
		Report

Bye/s: Winelands

=== Round seven ===
10 August 1991	Winelands	16–34	North Western Cape	Malmesbury
		Report

10 August 1991	South Western Districts	17–17	SARU	Oudtshoorn
		Report

Bye/s: Lowveld

=== Round eight ===
24 August 1991	SARU	11–31	Lowveld	Port Elizabeth
		Report

24 August 1991	Winelands	28–15	South Western Districts	Malmesbury
		Report

Bye/s: North Western Cape

=== Round nine ===
7 September 1991	Lowveld	44–12	Winelands	Nelspruit
		Report

7 September 1991	South Western Districts	24–12	North Western Cape	Mossel Bay
		Report

Bye/s: SARU

=== Round ten ===
14 September 1991	North Western Cape	3–25	Lowveld
		Report

14 September 1991	SARU	57–9	Winelands	Port Elizabeth
		Report

Bye/s: South Western Districts

=== Final ===
The winner of the Rural D competition played off against the winner of the Rural C competition for the Bankfin Trophy.

21 September 1991	Eastern Free State	47–22	Lowveld	Bethlehem
		Report

== Relegation play-off ==
In the play-off match, North Eastern Cape beat Lowveld to clinch a spot in the 1992 Currie Cup Rural A, while Lowveld would play in the 1992 Currie Cup Rural B.

28 September 1991	North Eastern Cape	37–29	Lowveld	Graaff-Reinet
		Report

== See also ==
- 1991 Currie Cup
- 1991 Currie Cup / Central Series
- 1991 Currie Cup Central A
- 1991 Currie Cup Central B
- 1991 Currie Cup Central / Rural Series
- 1991 Currie Cup Rural C
- 1991 Lion Cup
