= 1992 Currie Cup Rural A & B =

Domestic rugby union competition

- Countries: South Africa
- Date: 4 April – 29 August 1992
- Champions: Stellaland
- Runners-up: Eastern Free State
- Relegated: None
- Matches played: 21

The 1992 Currie Cup Rural A & B was the fourth division of the Currie Cup competition, the premier domestic rugby union competition in South Africa. This was the 54th season since the competition started in 1889.

== Teams ==
Location of teams in the 1991 Currie Cup Rural A & B
Currie Cup Rural A teams
Currie Cup Rural B teams

1991 Currie Cup Rural A & B
Eastern Free State
Lowveld
North Eastern Cape
Northern Natal
North Western Cape
South Western Districts
Stellaland

=== Changes between 1991 and 1992 seasons ===
- The Currie Cup Rural C was renamed Currie Cup Rural A for 1992.
- Due to the merger of all rugby governing bodies in South Africa, 1991 Currie Cup Rural D sides SARA and Winelands were dissolved. This meant the Currie Cup Rural B was reduced to three teams for 1992. In order to increase the amount of fixtures for the Rural B sides, the Rural A competition was expanded to include one round of matches against the Rural B sides.

== Competition ==
There were seven participating teams in the 1992 Currie Cup Rural A & B competition — four Rural A sides and three Rural B sides. These teams played each other once over the course of the season, either at home or away. Teams received two points for a win and one point for a draw. The winner of the Rural A & B competition won the Bankfin Trophy.

== Log ==
1992 Currie Cup Rural A & B
Pos	Team	Pl	W	D	L	PF	PA	PD	TF	TA	Pts
1	Eastern Free State	6	5	1	0	194	92	+102			11
2	Stellaland	6	4	1	1	218	76	+142			9
3	North Eastern Cape	6	4	0	2	199	93	+106			8
4	South Western Districts	6	4	0	2	162	105	+57			8
5	Northern Natal	6	2	0	4	122	144	–22			4
6	North Western Cape	6	1	0	5	36	316	–280			2
7	Lowveld	6	0	0	6	91	196	–105			0
Eastern Free State and Stellaland qualified to the Bankfin Trophy final. * Legend: Pos = Position, Pl = Played, W = Won, D = Drawn, L = Lost, PF = Points for, PA = Points against, PD = Points difference, TF = Tries for, TA = Tries against, Pts = Log points Points breakdown: *2 points for a win *1 point for a draw

== Fixtures and results ==
=== Round one ===
4 April 1992	Northern Natal	22–31	North Eastern Cape	Newcastle
		Report

4 April 1992	South Western Districts	33–15	Lowveld	George
		Report

4 April 1992	Stellaland	19–19	Eastern Free State	Lichtenburg
		Report

Bye/s: North Western Cape

=== Round two ===
2 May 1992	Eastern Free State	27–13	Northern Natal	Bethlehem
		Report

2 May 1992	North Eastern Cape	13–8	Stellaland	Graaff-Reinet
		Report

Bye/s: Lowveld, North Western Cape, South Western Districts

=== Round three ===
16 May 1992	North Western Cape	8–35	Northern Natal	Upington
		Report

Bye/s: Eastern Free State, Lowveld, North Eastern Cape, South Western Districts, Stellaland

=== Round four ===
23 May 1992	Lowveld	12–17	Northern Natal	Nelspruit
		Report

Bye/s: Eastern Free State, North Eastern Cape, North Western Cape, South Western Districts, Stellaland

=== Round five ===
30 May 1992	North Eastern Cape	17–25	Eastern Free State	Cradock
		Report

30 May 1992	Northern Natal	23–31	Stellaland	Newcastle
		Report

30 May 1992	North Western Cape	6–41	South Western Districts	Springbok
		Report

Bye/s: Lowveld

=== Round six ===
6 June 1992	North Eastern Cape	72–0	North Western Cape	De Aar
		Report

Bye/s: Eastern Free State, Lowveld, Northern Natal, South Western Districts, Stellaland

=== Round seven ===
13 June 1992	Stellaland	20–6	Lowveld	Rustenburg
		Report

13 June 1992	Eastern Free State	22–16	South Western Districts	Bethlehem
		Report

Bye/s: North Eastern Cape, Northern Natal, North Western Cape

=== Round eight ===
27 June 1992	Lowveld	24–61	Eastern Free State	Nelspruit
		Report

27 June 1992	Stellaland	110–0	North Western Cape	Mafikeng
		Report

27 June 1992	South Western Districts	22–20	North Eastern Cape	Mossel Bay
		Report

Bye/s: Northern Natal

=== Round nine ===
11 July 1992	Northern Natal	12–35	South Western Districts	Newcastle
		Report

Bye/s: Eastern Free State, Lowveld, North Eastern Cape, North Western Cape, Stellaland

=== Round ten ===
18 July 1992	North Western Cape	19–18	Lowveld	Upington
		Report

Bye/s: Eastern Free State, North Eastern Cape, Northern Natal, South Western Districts, Stellaland

=== Round eleven ===
25 July 1992	Eastern Free State	40–3	North Western Cape	Bethlehem
		Report

25 July 1992	Lowveld	16–46	North Eastern Cape	Nelspruit
		Report

25 July 1992	South Western Districts	15–30	Stellaland	Oudtshoorn
		Report

Bye/s: Eastern Free State, Lowveld, North Eastern Cape, Northern Natal, North Western Cape, South Western Districts, Stellaland

=== Final ===
29 August 1992	Stellaland	24–15	Eastern Free State	Lichtenburg
		Report

== See also ==
- 1992 Currie Cup
- 1992 Currie Cup / Central Series
- 1992 Currie Cup Central A
- 1992 Currie Cup Central B
- 1992 Currie Cup Central / Rural Series
- 1992 Currie Cup Rural B
- 1992 Lion Cup
