= 1990 Currie Cup Division A =

Top division of the premier domestic rugby union competition in South Africa

- Countries: South Africa
- Date: 4 May – 6 October 1990
- Champions: Natal (1st title)
- Runners-up: Northern Transvaal

The 1990 Currie Cup Division A (known as the Santam Bank Currie Cup for sponsorship reasons) was the top division of the Currie Cup competition, the premier domestic rugby union competition in South Africa. This was the 52nd season since the competition started in 1889.

== Teams ==
Location of teams in 1990 Currie Cup Division A

1990 Currie Cup Division A
Eastern Province
Free State
Natal
Northern Free State
Northern Transvaal
Transvaal
Western Province
Western Transvaal

=== Changes between 1989 and 1990 seasons ===
- South West Africa withdrew.
- Western Transvaal were promoted from Division B.

=== Changes between 1990 and 1991 seasons ===
- The Currie Cup competition was reduced to six teams, with Northern Free State and Western Transvaal relegated to the 1991 Currie Cup Central A competition.

== Competition ==
There were eight participating teams in the 1990 Currie Cup Division A. These teams played each other twice over the course of the season, once at home and once away. Teams received two points for a win and one point for a draw. The top two teams qualified for the title play-offs. The final was then played at the home venue of the team that finished first during the season.

== Log ==
1990 Currie Cup Division A log
Pos	Team	Pld	W	D	L	PF	PA	PD	TF	TA	Pts	Qualification
1	Northern Transvaal	14	12	1	1	423	198	+225	55	14	25	Currie Cup final
2	Natal	14	11	1	2	324	231	+93	37	28	23	Currie Cup semi-final
3	Free State	14	8	2	4	331	277	+54	42	28	18	
4	Western Province	14	7	1	6	334	269	+65	33	27	15	
5	Eastern Province	14	7	0	7	324	275	+49	42	25	14	
6	Transvaal	14	6	0	8	335	307	+28	34	31	12	
7	Western Transvaal	14	1	1	12	212	489	−277	22	60	3	Relegated to 1991 Currie Cup Central A
8	Northern Free State	14	1	0	13	214	451	−237	13	65	2	Relegated to 1991 Currie Cup Central A

Rules for classification: 2 points for a win, 1 point for a draw

== Fixtures and results ==
=== Round one ===
4 May 1990	Northern Transvaal	42–9	Northern Free State	Loftus Versfeld, Pretoria
		Report

5 May 1990	Eastern Province	50–24	Western Transvaal	Port Elizabeth
		Report

5 May 1990	Free State	15–13	Transvaal	Bloemfontein
		Report

Bye/s: Natal, Western Province

=== Round two ===
12 May 1990	Natal	18–9	Free State	Kings Park Stadium, Durban
		Report

12 May 1990	Northern Free State	13–36	Western Province	Welkom
		Report

12 May 1990	Transvaal	28–22	Eastern Province	Johannesburg
		Report

12 May 1990	Western Transvaal	13–43	Northern Transvaal	Olën Park, Potchefstroom
		Report

=== Round three ===
19 May 1990	Eastern Province	13–12	Northern Transvaal	Port Elizabeth
		Report

19 May 1990	Free State	36–15	Northern Free State	Bloemfontein
		Report

19 May 1990	Transvaal	19–25	Natal	Johannesburg
		Report

19 May 1990	Western Province	36–24	Western Transvaal	Newlands Stadium, Cape Town
		Report

=== Round four ===
26 May 1990	Northern Transvaal	25–12	Western Province	Loftus Versfeld, Pretoria
		Report

Bye/s: Eastern Province, Free State, Natal, Northern Free State, Transvaal, Western Transvaal

=== Round five ===
31 May 1990	Western Province	18–18	Natal	Newlands Stadium, Cape Town
		Report

2 June 1990	Northern Free State	10–16	Transvaal	Welkom
		Report

2 June 1990	Western Transvaal	12–12	Free State	Olën Park, Potchefstroom
		Report

Bye/s: Eastern Province, Natal, Northern Transvaal, Western Province

=== Round six ===
8 June 1990	Transvaal	30–17	Western Transvaal	Ellis Park Stadium, Johannesburg
		Report

9 June 1990	Free State	21–39	Northern Transvaal	Free State Stadium, Bloemfontein
		Report

9 June 1990	Natal	49–6	Northern Free State	Kings Park Stadium, Durban
		Report

9 June 1990	Western Province	22–9	Eastern Province	Newlands Stadium, Cape Town
		Report

=== Round seven ===
16 June 1990	Eastern Province	23–12	Northern Free State	Port Elizabeth
		Report

16 June 1990	Northern Transvaal	21–18	Transvaal	Loftus Versfeld, Pretoria
		Report

16 June 1990	Western Province	16–21	Free State	Newlands Stadium, Cape Town
		Report

16 June 1990	Western Transvaal	21–27	Natal	Olën Park, Potchefstroom
		Report

=== Round eight ===
23 June 1990	Free State	21–30	Eastern Province	Free State Stadium, Bloemfontein
		Report

23 June 1990	Natal	9–24	Northern Transvaal	Durban
		Report

23 June 1990	Northern Free State	15–13	Western Transvaal	Welkom
		Report

23 June 1990	Transvaal	25–24	Western Province	Johannesburg
		Report

=== Round nine ===
14 July 1990	Eastern Province	20–21	Natal	Boet Erasmus Stadium, Port Elizabeth
		Report

Bye/s: Free State, Northern Free State, Northern Transvaal, Transvaal, Western Province, Western Transvaal

=== Round ten ===
4 August 1990	Natal	21–12	Western Province	Durban
		Report

4 August 1990	Northern Free State	27–33	Northern Transvaal	Welkom
		Report

4 August 1990	Transvaal	21–37	Free State	Ellis Park Stadium, Johannesburg
		Report

4 August 1990	Western Transvaal	12–42	Eastern Province	Olën Park, Potchefstroom
		Report

=== Round eleven ===
17 August 1990	Northern Transvaal	64–6	Western Transvaal	Loftus Versfeld, Pretoria
		Report

18 August 1990	Eastern Province	21–12	Transvaal	Port Elizabeth
		Report

18 August 1990	Free State	9–21	Natal	Bloemfontein
		Report

18 August 1990	Western Province	27–21	Northern Free State	Newlands Stadium, Cape Town

=== Round twelve ===
25 August 1990	Natal	27–25	Transvaal	Kings Park Stadium, Durban
		Report

25 August 1990	Northern Free State	18–37	Free State	Welkom
		Report

25 August 1990	Northern Transvaal	18–13	Eastern Province	Loftus Versfeld, Pretoria
		Report

25 August 1990	Western Transvaal	13–39	Western Province	Potchefstroom
		Report

=== Round thirteen ===
31 August 1990	Transvaal	55–15	Northern Free State	Ellis Park Stadium, Johannesburg
		Report

1 September 1990	Free State	31–13	Western Transvaal	Free State Stadium, Bloemfontein
		Report

1 September 1990	Natal	21–8	Eastern Province	Kings Park Stadium, Durban
		Report

1 September 1990	Western Province	12–17	Northern Transvaal	Newlands Stadium, Cape Town
		Report

=== Round fourteen ===
8 September 1990	Eastern Province	15–30	Western Province	Port Elizabeth
		Report

8 September 1990	Northern Free State	20–21	Natal	Welkom
		Report

8 September 1990	Northern Transvaal	21–21	Free State	Loftus Versfeld, Pretoria
		Report

8 September 1990	Western Transvaal	6–39	Transvaal	Olën Park, Potchefstroom
		Report

=== Round fifteen ===
15 September 1990	Free State	31–19	Western Province	Free State Stadium, Bloemfontein
		Report

15 September 1990	Natal	40–12	Western Transvaal	Kings Park Stadium, Durban
		Report

15 September 1990	Northern Free State	12–37	Eastern Province	Welkom
		Report

15 September 1990	Transvaal	18–36	Northern Transvaal	Ellis Park Stadium, Johannesburg
		Report

=== Round sixteen ===
22 September 1990	Eastern Province	21–30	Free State	Port Elizabeth
		Report

22 September 1990	Northern Transvaal	28–6	Natal	Loftus Versfeld, Pretoria
		Report

22 September 1990	Western Province	31–16	Transvaal	Newlands Stadium, Cape Town
		Report

22 September 1990	Western Transvaal	26–21	Northern Free State	Olën Park, Potchefstroom
		Report

=== Final ===
6 October 1990	Northern Transvaal	12–18	Natal	Loftus Versfeld, Pretoria
		Report

== See also ==
- 1990 Currie Cup Division B
- 1990 Santam Bank Trophy
- 1990 Lion Cup
