= 1990 Lion Cup =

Rugby union competition in South Africa

- Countries: South Africa
- Date: 31 March – 28 July 1990
- Champions: Northern Transvaal (2nd title)
- Runners-up: Western Province
- Matches played: 24

The 1990 Lion Cup was the eighth edition of the Lion Cup, the premier domestic rugby union knock-out competition in South Africa.

== Teams ==
All 25 South African provincial teams took part in this competition. They were ranked as follows:

1990 Lion Cup teams
Group	Ranking	Team
Group A	1	Northern Transvaal
Group A	2	Western Province
Group A	3	Free State
Group A	4	Transvaal
Group B	5	Natal
Group B	6	Northern Free State
Group B	7	Eastern Province
Group B	8	Western Transvaal
Group C	9	Griqualand West
Group C	10	Eastern Transvaal
Group C	11	Vaal Triangle
Group C	12	South Eastern Transvaal
Group D	13	Boland
Group D	14	Eastern Free State
Group D	15	Far North
Group D	16	Western Province League
Group E	17	Border
Group E	18	North Eastern Cape
Group E	19	South Western Districts
Group E	20	Northern Natal
Group F	21	Stellaland
Group F	22	Lowveld
Group F	23	Winelands
Group F	24	North Western Cape
Group F	25	SARU

== Competition ==
This competition was a knock-out competition. The 25 teams were divided into six groups of four teams (with a fifth team in Group F). The teams ranked 24 and 25 played each other in the Qualifying Round with the winner advancing to Round One. In Round One, the teams from Group C played against the teams in Group E, while the teams in Group D played against the teams in Group F. In Round Two, the winners of the eight Round One ties played against each other for a place in Round Three. The winners of the four Round Two matches then joined teams in Group B for Round Three, with the winning teams progressing to the quarter-finals (where they were joined by the teams from Group A), followed by Semi-finals and the Final.

== Fixtures and results ==
The fixtures were as follows:

=== Qualifying round ===
20 March 1990	SARU	24–7	North Western Cape	Welkom
		Report

=== Round one ===
31 March 1990	Border	9–18	Eastern Transvaal	East London
		Report

31 March 1990	Lowveld	18–40	Boland	Nelspruit
		Report

31 March 1990	North Eastern Cape	22–4	Vaal Triangle	Cradock
		Report

31 March 1990	Northern Natal	19–12	South Eastern Transvaal	Newcastle
		Report

31 March 1990	South Western Districts	19–37	Griqualand West	Mossel Bay
		Report

31 March 1990	Stellaland	16–50	Western Province League	Lichtenburg
		Report

31 March 1990	Winelands	15–20	Far North	Wellington
		Report

2 April 1990	Eastern Free State	15–21	SARU	Welkom
		Report

Bye/s: Eastern Province, Free State, Natal, Northern Free State, Northern Transvaal, Transvaal, Western Province, Western Transvaal

=== Round two ===
6 April 1990	Boland	19–22	Eastern Transvaal	Wellington
		Report

6 April 1990	North Eastern Cape	22–34	Far North	Cradock
		Report

6 April 1990	Northern Natal	13–33	Western Province League	Newcastle
		Report

9 April 1990	Griqualand West	31–0	SARU	Kimberley
		Report

Bye/s: Eastern Province, Free State, Natal, Northern Free State, Northern Transvaal, Transvaal, Western Province, Western Transvaal

=== Round three ===
21 April 1990	Eastern Transvaal	15–49	Western Transvaal	Springs
		Report

21 April 1990	Far North	13–9	Northern Free State	Pietersburg
		Report

21 April 1990	Griqualand West	9–45	Natal	Kimberley
		Report

21 April 1990	Western Province League	10–15	Eastern Province	Paarl
		Report

Bye/s: Free State, Northern Transvaal, Transvaal, Western Province

=== Quarter-finals ===
30 June 1990	Natal	43–6	Free State	Durban
		Report

30 June 1990	Northern Transvaal	37–12	Far North	Loftus Versfeld, Pretoria
		Report

30 June 1990	Transvaal	20–6	Eastern Province	Ellis Park Stadium, Johannesburg
		Report

30 June 1990	Western Transvaal	10–31	Western Province	Potchefstroom
		Report

=== Semi-finals ===
7 July 1990	Northern Transvaal	15–10	Transvaal	Loftus Versfeld, Pretoria
		Report

7 July 1990	Western Province	27–21	Natal	Newlands Stadium, Cape Town
		Report

=== Final ===
28 July 1990	Northern Transvaal	25–12	Western Province	Loftus Versfeld, Pretoria
		Report

== See also ==
- 1990 Currie Cup Division A
- 1990 Currie Cup Division B
- 1990 Santam Bank Trophy
