= 1992 Currie Cup Rural B =

Domestic rugby union competition

- Countries: South Africa
- Date: 11 April – 1 August 1992
- Champions: South Western Districts
- Runners-up: Lowveld
- Promoted: None
- Matches played: 6

The 1992 Currie Cup Rural B was the fifth division of the Currie Cup competition, the premier domestic rugby union competition in South Africa. This was the 54th season since the competition started in 1889. The competition was known as the Currie Cup Rural D in 1991.

== Teams ==
Location of teams in 1992 Currie Cup Rural B

1992 Currie Cup Rural B
Lowveld
North Western Cape
South Western Districts

=== Changes between 1991 and 1992 seasons ===
- Following the merger of all rugby governing bodies in South Africa, SARA and Winelands were dissolved. Currie Cup Rural D was reduced to three teams for 1992.
- The Currie Cup Rural D was renamed Currie Cup Rural B for 1992.

== Competition ==
There were three participating teams in the 1992 Currie Cup Rural B competition. These teams played each other twice over the course of the season, once at home and once away. Teams received two points for a win and one point for a draw.

In addition, all the Currie Cup Rural B teams also played in the 1992 Currie Cup Rural A & B.

== Log ==
1992 Currie Cup Rural B
Pos	Team	Pl	W	D	L	PF	PA	PD	TF	TA	Pts
1	South Western Districts	4	3	0	1	91	63	+28			6
2	Lowveld	4	2	1	1	80	77	+3			5
3	North Western Cape	4	0	1	3	54	85	–31			1
* Legend: Pos = Position, Pl = Played, W = Won, D = Drawn, L = Lost, PF = Points for, PA = Points against, PD = Points difference, TF = Tries for, TA = Tries against, Pts = Log points Points breakdown: *2 points for a win *1 point for a draw

== Fixtures and results ==
=== Round one ===
11 April 1992	North Western Cape	6–15	South Western Districts	Upington
		Report

Bye/s: Lowveld

=== Round two ===
2 May 1992	South Western Districts	28–19	North Western Cape
		Report

Bye/s: Lowveld

=== Round three ===
16 May 1992	South Western Districts	32–21	Lowveld	Mossel Bay
		Report

Bye/s: North Western Cape

=== Round four ===
20 June 1992	North Western Cape	10–23	Lowveld	Upington
		Report

Bye/s: South Western Districts

=== Round five ===
4 July 1992	Lowveld	17–16	South Western Districts	Nelspruit
		Report

Bye/s: North Western Cape

=== Round six ===
1 August 1992	Lowveld	19–19	North Western Cape
		Report

Bye/s: South Western Districts

== See also ==
- 1992 Currie Cup
- 1992 Currie Cup / Central Series
- 1992 Currie Cup Central A
- 1992 Currie Cup Central B
- 1992 Currie Cup Central / Rural Series
- 1992 Currie Cup Rural A & B
- 1992 Lion Cup
