= 1992 Currie Cup =

Domestic rugby union competition

- Countries: South Africa
- Date: 2 May – 12 September 1992
- Champions: Natal (2nd title)
- Runners-up: Transvaal
- Matches played: 31

The 1992 Currie Cup (known as the Bankfin Currie Cup for sponsorship reasons) was the top division of the Currie Cup competition, the premier domestic rugby union competition in South Africa. This was the 54th season since the competition started in 1889.

== Teams ==
Location of teams in the 1992 Currie Cup

1992 Currie Cup
Eastern Province
Free State
Natal
Northern Transvaal
Transvaal
Western Province

=== Changes between 1991 and 1992 seasons ===
- None

=== Changes between 1992 and 1993 seasons ===
- None

== Competition ==
There were six participating teams in the 1992 Currie Cup. These teams played each other twice over the course of the season, once at home and once away. Teams received two points for a win and one point for a draw. The top two teams qualified for the final.

In addition, all the Currie Cup teams also played in the 1992 Currie Cup / Central Series.

== Log ==
1992 Currie Cup
Pos	Team	Pld	W	D	L	PF	PA	PD	TF	TA	Pts	Qualification
1	Natal	10	8	1	1	246	175	+71	25	11	17	Currie Cup final
2	Transvaal	10	6	2	2	373	267	+106	43	24	14	Currie Cup final
3	Northern Transvaal	10	5	0	5	242	218	+24	18	17	10	
4	Western Province	10	4	0	6	205	280	−75	15	27	8	
5	Free State	10	3	1	6	236	248	−12	21	27	7	
6	Eastern Province	10	2	0	8	152	266	−114	9	25	4	

Rules for classification: 2 points for a win; 1 point for a draw

== Fixtures and results ==
=== Round one ===
2 May 1992	Free State	22–14	Northern Transvaal	Free State Stadium, Bloemfontein
		Report

2 May 1992	Natal	31–19	Western Province	Kings Park Stadium, Durban
		Report

2 May 1992	Transvaal	35–29	Eastern Province	Ellis Park Stadium, Johannesburg
		Report

=== Round two ===
16 May 1992	Northern Transvaal	27–24	Natal	Loftus Versfeld, Pretoria
		Report

16 May 1992	Western Province	14–35	Transvaal	Newlands Stadium, Cape Town
		Report

Bye/s: Eastern Province, Free State

=== Round three ===
23 May 1992	Eastern Province	17–15	Western Province	Boet Erasmus Stadium, Port Elizabeth
		Report

23 May 1992	Natal	16–13	Free State	Kings Park Stadium, Durban
		Report

23 May 1992	Transvaal	41–20	Northern Transvaal	Ellis Park Stadium, Johannesburg
		Report

=== Round four ===
30 May 1992	Free State	36–43	Transvaal	Bloemfontein
		Report

30 May 1992	Northern Transvaal	24–9	Eastern Province	Pretoria
		Report

Bye/s: Natal, Western Province

=== Round five ===
6 June 1992	Eastern Province	18–16	Free State	Boet Erasmus Stadium, Port Elizabeth
		Report

6 June 1992	Western Province	15–14	Northern Transvaal	Newlands Stadium, Cape Town
		Report

Bye/s: Natal, Transvaal

=== Round six ===
13 June 1992	Free State	37–19	Western Province	Free State Stadium, Bloemfontein
		Report

13 June 1992	Natal	31–16	Eastern Province	Kings Park Stadium, Durban
		Report

Bye/s: Northern Transvaal, Transvaal

=== Round seven ===
20 June 1992	Eastern Province	9–41	Transvaal	Boet Erasmus Stadium, Port Elizabeth
		Report

20 June 1992	Northern Transvaal	39–16	Free State	Loftus Versfeld, Pretoria
		Report

20 June 1992	Western Province	11–19	Natal	Newlands Stadium, Cape Town
		Report

=== Round eight ===
27 June 1992	Natal	17–12	Northern Transvaal	Kings Park Stadium, Durban
		Report

27 June 1992	Transvaal	66–30	Western Province	Ellis Park Stadium, Johannesburg
		Report

Bye/s: Eastern Province, Free State

=== Round nine ===
4 July 1992	Free State	12–25	Natal	Bloemfontein
		Report

4 July 1992	Northern Transvaal	36–28	Transvaal	Loftus Versfeld, Pretoria
		Report

4 July 1992	Western Province	20–15	Eastern Province	Newlands Stadium, Cape Town
		Report

=== Round ten ===
11 July 1992	Natal	16–16	Transvaal	Durban
		Report

Bye/s: Eastern Province, Free State, Northern Transvaal, Western Province

=== Round eleven ===
18 July 1992	Transvaal	38–47	Natal	Ellis Park Stadium, Johannesburg
		Report

Bye/s: Eastern Province, Free State, Northern Transvaal, Western Province

=== Round twelve ===
25 July 1992	Eastern Province	13–33	Northern Transvaal	Boet Erasmus Stadium, Port Elizabeth
		Report

25 July 1992	Transvaal	30–30	Free State	Ellis Park Stadium, Johannesburg
		Report

Bye/s: Natal, Western Province

=== Round thirteen ===
1 August 1992	Free State	31–15	Eastern Province	Bloemfontein
		Report

1 August 1992	Northern Transvaal	23–33	Western Province	Loftus Versfeld, Pretoria
		Report

Bye/s: Natal, Transvaal

=== Round fourteen ===
29 August 1992	Western Province	29–23	Free State	Newlands Stadium, Cape Town
		Report

29 August 1992	Eastern Province	11–20	Natal	Port Elizabeth
		Report

Bye/s: Northern Transvaal, Transvaal

=== Final ===
12 September 1992	Transvaal	13–14	Natal	Ellis Park Stadium, Johannesburg
		Report

== See also ==
- 1992 Currie Cup / Central Series
- 1992 Currie Cup Central A
- 1992 Currie Cup Central B
- 1992 Currie Cup Central / Rural Series
- 1992 Currie Cup Rural A & B
- 1992 Currie Cup Rural B
- 1992 Lion Cup
