= 1991 Currie Cup Central / Rural Series =

Domestic rugby union competition

1991 Currie Cup / Central Series
- Countries: South Africa
- Date: 30 April – 14 September 1991
- Champions: Border; Northern Natal
- Matches played: 24

The 1991 Currie Cup Central / Rural Series was a rugby union competition held between the teams in the 1991 Currie Cup Central B and 1991 Currie Cup Rural C competitions, the third and fourth tiers of the premier domestic competition in South Africa. This formed part of the 53rd Currie Cup season since the competition started in 1889.

== Teams ==
Location of teams in the 1991 Currie Cup Central / Rural Series
Currie Cup Central B teams
Currie Cup Rural C teams

1991 Currie Cup Central / Rural Series
Boland
Border
Eastern Free State
Far North
Griqualand West
North Eastern Cape
Northern Natal
South Eastern Transvaal
Stellaland
Vaal Triangle

== Competition ==
There were ten participating teams in the 1991 Currie Cup Central / Rural Series, the six teams from the 1991 Currie Cup Central B competition and the four teams from the 1991 Currie Cup Rural C competition. These teams played the teams from the other league once over the course of the season, either at home or away. Teams received two points for a win and one point for a draw.

== Log ==
1991 Currie Cup Central / Rural Series — Currie Cup Central B teams
Pos	Team	Pl	W	D	L	PF	PA	PD	TF	TA	Pts
1	Border	4	4	0	0	129	64	+65	18	9	8
2	Boland	4	4	0	0	107	73	+34	17	9	8
3	Griqualand West	4	3	0	1	63	58	+5	7	5	6
4	Vaal Triangle	4	2	1	1	102	97	+5	15	8	5
5	Far North	4	2	0	2	78	93	–15	8	10	4
6	South Eastern Transvaal	4	1	0	3	79	79	0	5	6	2
1991 Currie Cup Central / Rural Series — Currie Cup Rural C teams
1	Northern Natal	6	2	1	3	81	132	–51	7	19	5
2	Stellaland	6	2	0	4	125	114	+9	15	11	4
3	Eastern Free State	6	2	0	4	134	149	–15	10	19	4
4	North Eastern Cape	6	1	0	5	125	163	–38	15	21	2
* Legend: Pos = Position, Pl = Played, W = Won, D = Drawn, L = Lost, PF = Points for, PA = Points against, PD = Points difference, TF = Tries for, TA = Tries against, Pts = Log points Points breakdown: *2 points for a win *1 point for a draw

== Fixtures and results ==
=== Round one ===
30 April 1991	Eastern Free State	21–27	Border	Bethlehem
		Report

Bye/s: Boland, Far North, Griqualand West, North Eastern Cape, Northern Natal, South Eastern Transvaal, Stellaland, Vaal Triangle

=== Round two ===
11 May 1991	Boland	28–18	Eastern Free State	Wellington
		Report

11 May 1991	Stellaland	21–19	South Eastern Transvaal	Rustenburg
		Report

Bye/s: Border, Far North, Griqualand West, North Eastern Cape, Northern Natal, Vaal Triangle

=== Round three ===
25 May 1991	Griqualand West	15–13	Stellaland	Kathu
		Report

25 May 1991	Northern Natal	18–20	Boland	Ladysmith
		Report

25 May 1991	South Eastern Transvaal	33–18	North Eastern Cape
		Report

Bye/s: Far North, Vaal Triangle

=== Round four ===
8 June 1991	Border	52–9	Northern Natal	East London
		Report

8 June 1991	North Eastern Cape	15–16	Griqualand West
		Report

Bye/s: Boland, Eastern Free State, Far North, South Eastern Transvaal, Stellaland, Vaal Triangle

=== Round five ===
22 June 1991	Stellaland	13–23	Far North	Rustenburg
		Report

22 June 1991	Vaal Triangle	36–12	Eastern Free State
		Report

Bye/s: Boland, Border, Griqualand West, North Eastern Cape, Northern Natal, South Eastern Transvaal

=== Round six ===
29 June 1991	Boland	24–18	Stellaland	Wellington
		Report

29 June 1991	Eastern Free State	28–24	South Eastern Transvaal
		Report

29 June 1991	North Eastern Cape	22–36	Vaal Triangle
		Report

29 June 1991	Northern Natal	15–10	Griqualand West
		Report

Bye/s: Border, Far North

=== Round seven ===
3 August 1991	North Eastern Cape	19–35	Boland
		Report

3 August 1991	South Eastern Transvaal	3–12	Northern Natal
		Report

Bye/s: Border, Eastern Free State, Far North, Griqualand West, Stellaland, Vaal Triangle

=== Round eight ===
17 August 1991	Border	29–19	North Eastern Cape	East London
		Report

17 August 1991	Eastern Free State	40–12	Far North	Bethlehem
		Report

17 August 1991	Northern Natal	18–18	Vaal Triangle	Vryheid
		Report

Bye/s: Boland, Griqualand West, South Eastern Transvaal, Stellaland

=== Round nine ===
24 August 1991	Griqualand West	22–15	Eastern Free State	Kimberley
		Report

24 August 1991	Stellaland	15–21	Border	Zeerust
		Report

Bye/s: Boland, Far North, North Eastern Cape, Northern Natal, South Eastern Transvaal, Vaal Triangle

=== Round ten ===
7 September 1991	Far North	14–32	North Eastern Cape	Pietersburg
		Report

7 September 1991	Vaal Triangle	12–45	Stellaland
		Report

Bye/s: Boland, Border, Eastern Free State, Griqualand West, Northern Natal, South Eastern Transvaal

=== Round eleven ===
14 September 1991	Far North	29–9	Northern Natal
		Report

Bye/s: Boland, Border, Eastern Free State, Griqualand West, North Eastern Cape, South Eastern Transvaal, Stellaland, Vaal Triangle

== See also ==
- 1991 Currie Cup
- 1991 Currie Cup / Central Series
- 1991 Currie Cup Central A
- 1991 Currie Cup Central B
- 1991 Currie Cup Rural C
- 1991 Currie Cup Rural D
- 1991 Lion Cup
