= 1992 Currie Cup Central B =

Domestic rugby union competition

- Countries: South Africa
- Date: 3 April – 31 July 1992
- Champions: Boland
- Runners-up: Griqualand West
- Matches played: 20

The 1992 Currie Cup Central B was the third division of the Currie Cup competition, the premier domestic rugby union competition in South Africa. This was the 54th season since the competition started in 1889.

== Teams ==
Location of teams in 1992 Currie Cup Central B

1992 Currie Cup Central B
Boland
Far North
Griqualand West
South Eastern Transvaal
Vaal Triangle

=== Changes between 1991 and 1992 seasons ===
- Eastern Transvaal were initially relegated from 1991 Currie Cup Central A to the Currie Cup Central B. However, following the merger of all rugby governing bodies in South Africa, Western Province League were dissolved and Eastern Transvaal retained their place in Currie Cup Central A. Currie Cup Central B was reduced to five teams for 1992.
- Border were promoted from the Central B to 1992 Currie Cup Central A.

=== Changes between 1992 and 1993 seasons ===
- None.

== Competition ==
There were five participating teams in the 1992 Currie Cup Central B competition. These teams played each other twice over the course of the season, once at home and once away. Teams received two points for a win and one point for a draw. The winner of the Central B competition played off against the winner of the Central A competition for the Bankfin Cup.

In addition, all the Currie Cup Central B teams also played in the 1992 Currie Cup Central / Rural Series.

== Log ==
1992 Currie Cup Central B
| Pos | Team | Pl | W | D | L | PF | PA | PD | TF | TA | Pts |
| 1 | Boland | 8 | 6 | 0 | 2 | 185 | 131 | +54 | | | 12 |
| 2 | Griqualand West | 8 | 6 | 0 | 2 | 127 | 77 | +50 | | | 12 |
| 3 | Far North | 8 | 3 | 1 | 4 | 157 | 180 | –23 | | | 7 |
| 4 | Vaal Triangle | 8 | 3 | 0 | 5 | 140 | 143 | –3 | | | 6 |
| 5 | South Eastern Transvaal | 8 | 1 | 1 | 6 | 140 | 218 | –78 | | | 3 |
Boland qualified to the Bankfin Cup final. * Legend: Pos = Position, Pl = Played, W = Won, D = Drawn, L = Lost, PF = Points for, PA = Points against, PD = Points difference, TF = Tries for, TA = Tries against, Pts = Log points Points breakdown: *2 points for a win *1 point for a draw

== Fixtures and results ==
=== Round one ===
| 3 April 1992 | Boland | 22–16 | Vaal Triangle | Wellington |
| | | Report |

| 3 April 1992 | Far North | 27–27 | South Eastern Transvaal | Pietersburg |
| | | Report |

Bye/s: Griqualand West

=== Round two ===
| 10 April 1992 | Vaal Triangle | 6–19 | Griqualand West | Sasolburg |
| | | Report |

Bye/s: Boland, Far North, South Eastern Transvaal

=== Round three ===
| 1 May 1992 | Griqualand West | 7–20 | Boland | Kimberley |
| | | Report |

| 1 May 1992 | Vaal Triangle | 18–24 | Far North | Sasolburg |
| | | Report |

Bye/s: South Eastern Transvaal

=== Round four ===
| 16 May 1992 | Far North | 26–30 | Boland | Pietersburg |
| | | Report |

Bye/s: Griqualand West, South Eastern Transvaal, Vaal Triangle

=== Round five ===
| 22 May 1992 | Vaal Triangle | 30–22 | South Eastern Transvaal | Sasolburg |
| | | Report |

Bye/s: Boland, Far North, Griqualand West

=== Round six ===
| 29 May 1992 | Far North | 28–24 | Griqualand West | Pietersburg |
| | | Report |

| 30 May 1992 | South Eastern Transvaal | 20–21 | Boland | Witbank |
| | | Report |

Bye/s: Vaal Triangle

=== Round seven ===
| 5 June 1992 | Griqualand West | 22–8 | South Eastern Transvaal | Kimberley |
| | | Report |

Bye/s: Boland, Far North, Vaal Triangle

=== Round eight ===
| 12 June 1992 | South Eastern Transvaal | 27–23 | Far North | Witbank |
| | | Report |

| 12 June 1992 | Vaal Triangle | 23–20 | Boland | Sasolburg |
| | | Report |

Bye/s: Griqualand West

=== Round nine ===
| 20 June 1992 | Griqualand West | 14–0 | Vaal Triangle | Kimberley |
| | | Report |

Bye/s: Boland, Far North, South Eastern Transvaal

=== Round ten ===
| 26 June 1992 | Vaal Triangle | 12–16 | Far North |
| | | Report |

| 27 June 1992 | Boland | 5–6 | Griqualand West | Wellington |
| | | Report |

Bye/s: South Eastern Transvaal

=== Round eleven ===
| 11 July 1992 | South Eastern Transvaal | 6–35 | Vaal Triangle | Groblersdal |
| | | Report |

Bye/s: Boland, Far North, Griqualand West

=== Round twelve ===
| 18 July 1992 | Boland | 25–13 | Far North | Wellington |
| | | Report |

Bye/s: Griqualand West, South Eastern Transvaal, Vaal Triangle

=== Round thirteen ===
| 24 July 1992 | Griqualand West | 17–0 | Far North |
| | | Report |

| 25 July 1992 | Boland | 42–20 | South Eastern Transvaal | Wellington |
| | | Report |

Bye/s: Vaal Triangle

=== Round fourteen ===
| 31 July 1992 | South Eastern Transvaal | 10–18 | Griqualand West |
| | | Report |

Bye/s: Boland, Far North, Vaal Triangle

=== Final ===
The winner of the Central B competition played off against the winner of the Central A competition for the Bankfin Cup.

| 5 September 1992 | Western Transvaal | 40–21 | Boland | Potchefstroom |
| | | Report |

- Western Transvaal won the 1992 Bankfin Cup.

== Promotion play-offs ==
As a result of the play-offs, Eastern Transvaal remained in the Currie Cup Central A for 1993, while Boland remained in the Currie Cup Central B for 1993.

| 11 September 1992 | Eastern Transvaal | 27–9 | Boland | Brakpan |
| | | Report |

== See also ==
- 1992 Currie Cup
- 1992 Currie Cup / Central Series
- 1992 Currie Cup Central A
- 1992 Currie Cup Central / Rural Series
- 1992 Currie Cup Rural A & B
- 1992 Currie Cup Rural B
- 1992 Lion Cup
