= 1991 Currie Cup =

Rugby union competition

- Countries: South Africa
- Date: 27 April – 5 October 1991
- Champions: Northern Transvaal (17th title)
- Runners-up: Transvaal
- Matches played: 30

The 1991 Currie Cup (known as the Bankfin Currie Cup for sponsorship reasons) was the top division of the Currie Cup competition, the premier domestic rugby union competition in South Africa. This was the 53rd season since the competition started in 1889 and the first time it was known as the Bankfin Currie Cup, following the sponsors' name change from Santam Bank.

== Teams ==
Location of teams in the 1991 Currie Cup

1991 Currie Cup
Eastern Province
Free State
Natal
Northern Transvaal
Transvaal
Western Province

=== Changes between 1990 and 1991 seasons ===
- The Currie Cup competition was reduced to six teams, with Northern Free State and Western Transvaal relegated to the 1991 Currie Cup Central A competition.

=== Changes between 1991 and 1992 seasons ===
- None

== Competition ==
There were six participating teams in the 1991 Currie Cup. These teams played each other twice over the course of the season, once at home and once away. Teams received two points for a win and one point for a draw. The top two teams qualified for the finals.

However, with teams tied on points, play-offs would be held to determine the finalists.

In addition, all the Currie Cup teams also played in the 1991 Currie Cup / Central Series.

== Log ==
1991 Currie Cup
Pos	Team	Pld	W	D	L	PF	PA	PD	TF	TA	Pts	Qualification
1	Transvaal	10	7	0	3	236	179	+57	22	14	14	Currie Cup final
2	Free State	10	6	0	4	231	201	+30	25	13	12	Currie Cup title play-offs
3	Northern Transvaal	10	6	0	4	214	208	+6	22	18	12	Currie Cup title play-offs
4	Western Province	10	6	0	4	210	207	+3	13	21	12	Currie Cup title play-offs
5	Natal	10	4	0	6	249	207	+42	28	19	8	
6	Eastern Province	10	1	0	9	134	272	−138	7	32	2	

Rules for classification: 2 points for a win, 1 point for a draw

== Fixtures and results ==
=== Round one ===
27 April 1991	Eastern Province	6–15	Transvaal	Boet Erasmus Stadium, Port Elizabeth
		Report

27 April 1991	Northern Transvaal	31–22	Free State	Loftus Versfeld, Pretoria
		Report

27 April 1991	Western Province	27–22	Natal	Newlands Stadium, Cape Town
		Report

=== Round two ===
11 May 1991	Natal	54–15	Northern Transvaal	Kings Park Stadium, Durban
		Report

11 May 1991	Transvaal	45–21	Western Province	Ellis Park Stadium, Johannesburg
		Report

Bye/s: Eastern Province, Free State

=== Round three ===
18 May 1991	Free State	15–18	Natal	Free State Stadium, Bloemfontein
		Report

18 May 1991	Northern Transvaal	9–24	Transvaal	Loftus Versfeld, Pretoria
		Report

18 May 1991	Western Province	27–16	Eastern Province	Newlands Stadium, Cape Town
		Report

=== Round four ===
8 June 1991	Eastern Province	12–21	Northern Transvaal	Boet Erasmus Stadium, Port Elizabeth
		Report

8 June 1991	Transvaal	25–12	Free State	Ellis Park Stadium, Johannesburg
		Report

Bye/s: Natal, Western Province

=== Round five ===
15 June 1991	Free State	22–9	Eastern Province	Bloemfontein
		Report

15 June 1991	Natal	16–27	Transvaal	Kings Park Stadium, Durban
		Report

15 June 1991	Northern Transvaal	26–24	Western Province	Loftus Versfeld, Pretoria
		Report

=== Round six ===
22 June 1991	Eastern Province	16–10	Natal	Boet Erasmus Stadium, Port Elizabeth
		Report

22 June 1991	Western Province	18–17	Free State	Newlands Stadium, Cape Town
		Report

Bye/s: Northern Transvaal, Transvaal

=== Round seven ===
3 August 1991	Free State	16–12	Northern Transvaal	Free State Stadium, Bloemfontein
		Report

3 August 1991	Natal	16–19	Western Province	Kings Park Stadium, Durban
		Report

3 August 1991	Transvaal	33–16	Eastern Province	Ellis Park Stadium, Johannesburg
		Report

=== Round eight ===
17 August 1991	Northern Transvaal	12–22	Natal	Loftus Versfeld, Pretoria
		Report

17 August 1991	Western Province	16–10	Transvaal	Newlands Stadium, Cape Town
		Report

Bye/s: Eastern Province, Free State

=== Round nine ===
24 August 1991	Eastern Province	3–31	Western Province	Port Elizabeth
		Report

24 August 1991	Natal	22–36	Free State	Kings Park Stadium, Durban
		Report

24 August 1991	Transvaal	12–35	Northern Transvaal	Ellis Park Stadium, Johannesburg
		Report

=== Round ten ===
7 September 1991	Free State	30–20	Transvaal	Free State Stadium, Bloemfontein
		Report

7 September 1991	Northern Transvaal	25–13	Eastern Province	Loftus Versfeld, Pretoria
		Report

Bye/s: Natal, Western Province

=== Round eleven ===
14 September 1991	Eastern Province	28–37	Free State	Boet Erasmus Stadium, Port Elizabeth
		Report

14 September 1991	Transvaal	25–18	Natal	Ellis Park Stadium, Johannesburg
		Report

14 September 1991	Western Province	9–28	Northern Transvaal	Newlands Stadium, Cape Town
		Report

=== Round twelve ===
21 September 1991	Free State	24–18	Western Province	Free State Stadium, Bloemfontein
		Report

21 September 1991	Natal	51–15	Eastern Province	Kings Park Stadium, Durban
		Report

Bye/s: Northern Transvaal, Transvaal

=== Quarter-final ===
25 September 1991	Northern Transvaal	34–21	Western Province	Loftus Versfeld, Pretoria
		Report

=== Semi-final ===
28 September 1991	Free State	23–27	Northern Transvaal	Bloemfontein
		Report

=== Final ===
5 October 1991	Transvaal	15–27	Northern Transvaal	Loftus Versfeld, Pretoria
		Report

== See also ==
- 1991 Currie Cup / Central Series
- 1991 Currie Cup Central A
- 1991 Currie Cup Central B
- 1991 Currie Cup Central / Rural Series
- 1991 Currie Cup Rural C
- 1991 Currie Cup Rural D
- 1991 Lion Cup
