= 1992 Lion Cup =

Rugby union competition in South Africa

- Countries: South Africa
- Date: 5 September – 9 October 1992
- Champions: Transvaal (3rd title)
- Runners-up: Free State
- Matches played: 21

The 1992 Lion Cup was the tenth edition of the Lion Cup, the premier domestic rugby union knock-out competition in South Africa.

== Teams ==
22 South African provincial teams took part in this competition.

Three teams - SARU, Western Province League and Winelands – withdrew following a merger between all the governing bodies of rugby in South Africa.

1991 Lion Cup teams
Ranking	Team
1	Northern Transvaal
2	Natal
3	Eastern Province
4	Transvaal
5	Free State
6	Northern Free State
7	Western Province
8	South Eastern Transvaal
9	Stellaland
10	Boland
11	Western Transvaal
12	Far North
13	Border
14	Northern Natal
15	Eastern Transvaal
16	Griqualand West
17	South Western Districts
18	North Eastern Cape
19	Vaal Triangle
20	Lowveld
21	Eastern Free State
22	North Western Cape

== Competition ==
This competition was a knock-out competition. The top ten ranked teams had a bye in Round One, while the teams ranked 11 to 22 played each other, with the winners progressing to Round Two. Those sixteen teams then played a straight knockout competition until the final.

== Fixtures and results ==
Initially, the competition was scheduled to run from 21 February to 25 July. However, due to fixture congestion it was initially indicated that the competition would be scrapped.

In July 1992, it was announced that the competition would indeed take place and would run from September to October.

The fixtures were as follows:

=== Round one ===
5 September 1992	North Western Cape	10–31	Eastern Transvaal	Upington
		Report

8 September 1992	Eastern Free State	53–25	Northern Natal	Bethlehem
		Report

8 September 1992	Lowveld	13–60	Border	Nelspruit
		Report

8 September 1992	North Eastern Cape	17–10	Far North	Cradock
		Report

8 September 1992	South Western Districts	8–10	Griqualand West	Mossel Bay
		Report

8 September 1992	Vaal Triangle	17–39	Western Transvaal
		Report

Bye/s: Boland, Eastern Province, Free State, Natal, Northern Free State, Northern Transvaal, South Eastern Transvaal, Stellaland, Transvaal, Western Province

=== Round two ===
15 September 1992	Boland	13–64	Transvaal	Wellington
		Report

15 September 1992	Border	17–19	Eastern Province	East London
		Report

15 September 1992	Eastern Free State	12–16	Western Province	Bethlehem
		Report

15 September 1992	Eastern Transvaal	24–67	Natal	Brakpan
		Report

15 September 1992	Griqualand West	5–14	Northern Transvaal	Kimberley
		Report

15 September 1992	North Eastern Cape	30–26	Northern Free State	Cradock
		Report

15 September 1992	Stellaland	26–25	South Eastern Transvaal	Rustenburg
		Report

15 September 1992	Western Transvaal	10–33	Free State	Potchefstroom
		Report

=== Quarter-finals ===
22 September 1992	Free State	34–27	Eastern Province	Bloemfontein
		Report

22 September 1992	Natal	15–13 (aet)	Western Province	Durban
		Report

22 September 1992	North Eastern Cape	14–29	Northern Transvaal	Cradock
		Report

22 September 1992	Stellaland	6–85	Transvaal	Rustenburg
		Report

=== Semi-finals ===
29 September 1992	Natal	16–26	Free State	Kings Park Stadium, Durban
		Report

29 September 1992	Transvaal	21–19	Northern Transvaal	Ellis Park Stadium, Johannesburg
		Report

=== Final ===
9 October 1992	Transvaal	17–12	Free State	Ellis Park Stadium, Johannesburg
		Report
