= Olën Park =

Stadium in Potchefstroom, South Africa

Coordinates: 26°43′32″S 27°06′54″E

Olën Park Stadium
- Interactive map of Olën Park Stadium
- Location: Potchefstroom, South Africa
- Capacity: 22,000

Construction
- Built: 1920

Olën Park, also known as Profert Olën Park for sponsorship reasons, is a stadium in Potchefstroom, South Africa.

It was used for rugby union matches by the Leopards team in the First Division of the Currie Cup as well as the Vodacom Cup. Quite often the annual inter-varsity between the North-West University and the University of the Free State is also played here.

Profert Olën Park was named after Carl Ludwig Theodor Olën who was the President of the Western Transvaal Rugby Union from 1922 to 1934. The stadium can host approximately 22,000 spectators.

In recent times a local fertilizer company situated in Potchefstroom, Profert has been contributing not only financially but also with their products and expertise, towards the upkeep of the playing field and as thus obtained the naming rights of the stadium.

As from 2012 Profert Olën Park will again be the stadium where all the home fixtures of the Leopards will be played because the sponsorship of the Royal Bafokeng Sports of the Leopards, has been terminated at the end of 2011.

In 2018, the Leopards announced that financial constraints meant they could no longer afford the maintenance of the stadium and they would play their rugby elsewhere.

== International Rugby Union Matches at Olën Park ==
Year	Result
1938	British & Irish Lions beat Western Transvaal 26 - 9
1949	New Zealand beat Western Transvaal 19 - 3
1953	Australia beat Western Transvaal 50 - 12
1955	Western Transvaal beat British & Irish Lions 9 - 6
1958	Western Transvaal beat British Barbarians 11 - 3
1960	New Zealand beat Transvaal Universities 45 - 6
1960	New Zealand beat Western Transvaal 28 - 3
1961	Ireland beat Western Transvaal 16 - 6
1962	British & Irish Lions beat Western Transvaal 11 - 6
1962	British & Irish Lions beat Combined Services 20 - 6
1963	Australia beat Western Transvaal 14 - 12
1967	France beat Western Transvaal 38 - 11
1968	British & Irish Lions beat Western Transvaal 20 - 12
1969	Western Transvaal beat Australia 18 - 6
1970	New Zealand beat Western Transvaal 21 - 17
1970	New Zealand beat South African Gazelles 29 - 25
1971	France beat Western Transvaal 50 - 0
1973	Western Transvaal beat Italy 32 - 6
1974	British & Irish Lions beat Western Transvaal 59 - 13
1976	New Zealand beat Western Transvaal 42 - 3
1979	International XV beat Western Transvaal 34 - 18
1979	Western Transvaal beat Newport 38 - 22
1980	British & Irish Lions beat Western Transvaal 22 - 19
1981	Ireland beat South African Mining Invitational XV 46 - 7
1982	South American Jaguars beat Western Transvaal Presidents XV 30 - 18
1986	New Zealand Cavaliers beat Western Transvaal 26 - 18
1987	South Sea Barbarians beat Combined Feeder Team 56 - 13
1992	Australia beat Western Transvaal 46 - 13
1994	England beat Western Transvaal 26 - 24
1994	Western Transvaal beat Uruguay 83 - 10
1995	North Harbour beat Western Transvaal 39 - 17
1995	Western Transvaal beat Ivory Coast 67 - 10
1996	New Zealand beat Western Transvaal 31 - 0
1998	Ireland beat Western Transvaal 26 - 18
2000	England beat Western Transvaal 52 - 22
