= Olive Coates Palgrave =

South African botanical illustrator (1889–1963)

- Olive Coates Palgrave c. 1918 with her son Deric
- Born: Olive Hannibal Trolip; 5 April 1889; Cradock, Eastern Cape, South Africa
- Died: August 1963 (aged 74); Umtali, Southern Rhodesia
- Education: Huguenot College
- Spouse: Sidney Heneage Coates Palgrave (1915-death)
- Children: 3

Uapaca kirkiana Müll.Arg. from Trees of Central Africa (1956)

Olive Hannibal Coates Palgrave MBE (5 April 1889 – August 1963) was a South African botanical illustrator, noted for her richly illustrated 1956 book "Trees of Central Africa".

== Biography ==
She was born in Cradock, Eastern Cape, the eldest of at least 5 children of Ada Mary Hannibal and Albert John Alfred Trollip (1857-1943), a descendant of the 1820 Settlers, and a Cradock sheep farmer who lost his entire flock in a snow storm, leading to his moving to Southern Rhodesia in 1895. His family joined him only in 1900, travelling by train to Bulawayo and then by the famous Zeederberg Coach Company to Gwelo, the Matabele Rebellion and Boer War having delayed their departure.

Her education commenced at the Huguenot College in Wellington, Western Cape where she, and South African mycologist Ethel Doidge, came under the influence of botany teacher Bertha Stoneman, botanist and author of 'Plants and their ways in South Africa'. Olive finished school in 1906.

In 1915, she married Sidney Heneage Coates Palgrave, a Rhodesian civil servant. They raised a family of three sons, Roderic (Deric) (1917), Keith (1926) and Paul (1929), all of whom regularly joined in excursions to the bush. Her son Keith Coates Palgrave published Trees of Southern Africa in 1977, a work which filled a need for a comprehensive reference work compact enough to be used as a field guide. Her son Paul Coates Palgrave, and Paul's wife Meg (née Stead) provided the photographs used in Keith's book.

She died in Umtali, Southern Rhodesia, aged 74.
