= Dutch Reformed Church, Wellington =

Church in Wellington, South Africa

Dutch Reformed Church
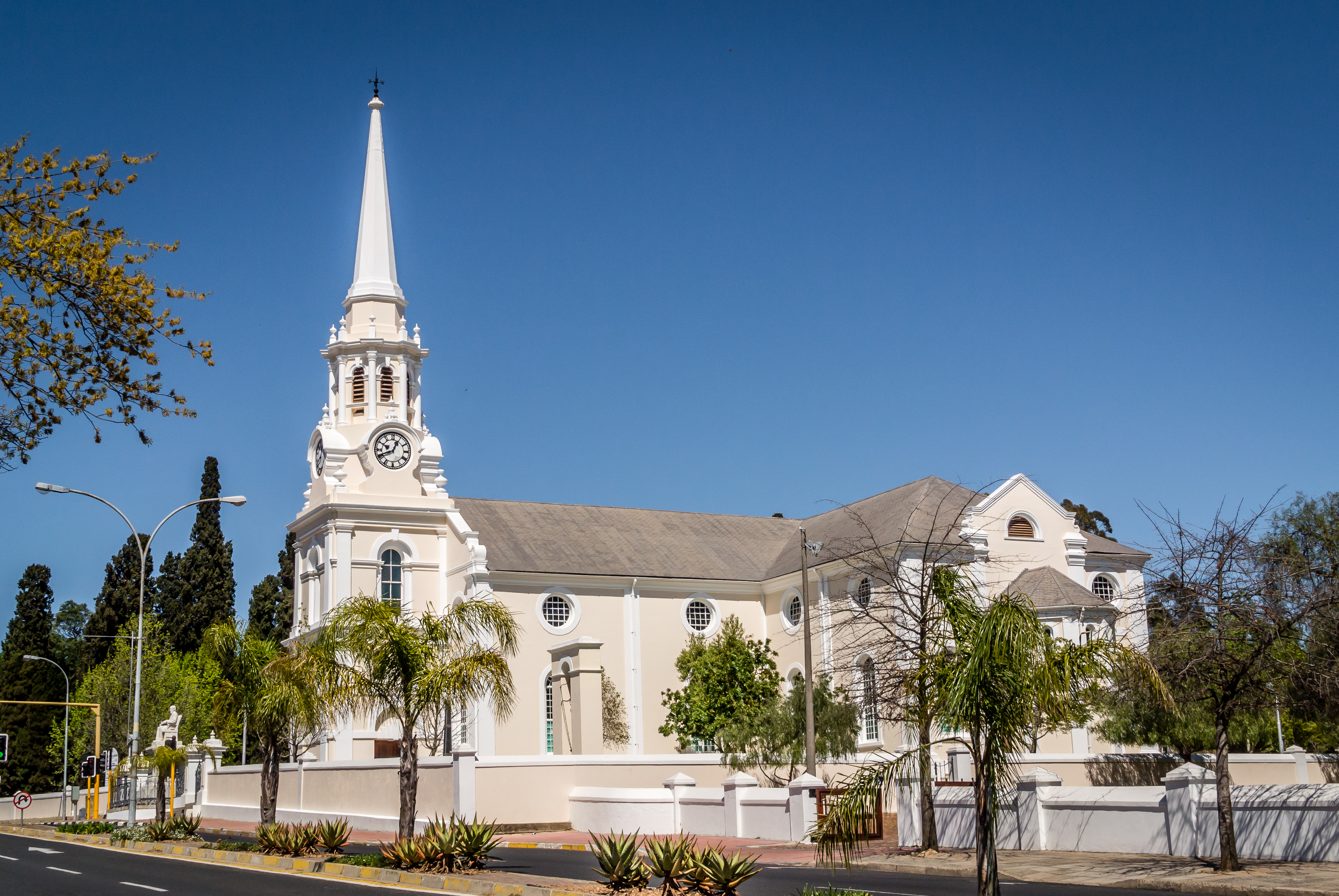
- Dutch Reformed Church
- 33.64199°S 19.00396°E
- Location: Wellington
- Country: South Africa
- Denomination: Nederduits Gereformeerde Kerk

History
- Founded: 1840

Architecture
- Functional status: Church

The Dutch Reformed Church in Wellington is a congregation of the Dutch Reformed Church in the Western Cape province, with its centre of gravity in the historic Boland town of Wellington. It was only founded in 1840 as the 26th congregation of the Cape Church, although the town is one of the oldest in the Western Cape.

== Foundation ==
The founding of the congregation in 1840 as a daughter of Paarl was the fruit of 40 years of striving for its own congregation in the Wagenmakers Valley, where especially the descendants of the Huguenots lived on their farms. Because of the leading and persistent role of Dr. John Addey in the realization of this endeavor, the desire was general to call the new congregation Addeysdorp, but on the recommendation of the then governor, Sir George Thomas Napier, the name of the Waterloo hero, Wellington, was generally accepted. The founding year (1840) coincided with the dedication of the church building and the confirmation of the first pastor, prop. A.F. du Toit, appointed by the governor at the request of all the inhabitants of the Wagenmakers Valley. With the addition of two wings in 1861, the addition of galleries in 1874, the construction of the tower in 1891 according to the plan of Charles Freeman and the raising of the roof in 1928, the original church building was expanded into the large and elegant house of worship that dominates Church Street today, with its wealth of memories of blessed conferences and times of revival, pious generations who have worshipped there over the years and God-consecrated lives who have preached the Gospel there.

As early as 1952, five of the congregation's deceased pastors rested in the shadow of the church building. During the first 78 years of its existence, the congregation had only four pastors and a single vacancy of only seven months between the death of its first pastor and the confirmation of Rev. Andrew Murray (1871). Rev. A. Murray (35 years) and Rev. Pieter Kuypers Albertyn (18 years) left their indelible mark on the congregation. Particularly under the leadership of Rev. Murray, Wellington took a unique place in the country's church life in the missionary and educational fields. Institutions such as the Sendinginstituut, Friedenheim, the Huguenot Seminary and other schools and personalities such as Misses Anna Bliss, Abbie Park Ferguson and Van Deemter, Rev. Ferguson, Rev. J.C. Pauw and Messrs. McCrone and Stucki remain inseparable from Wellington and from the large number of men and women who, in the early years, went from Wellington across the length and breadth of South Africa and far into foreign mission fields.

And over the years the congregation has laid great material offerings on the altar for the expansion of the heavenly Kingdom. In 1952 Ons gemeentelike feesalbum reported: "With the Huguenot College back in the bosom of the Dutch Reformed Church (1950) for the training of social and missionary workers under the leadership of Rev. E.J. du Toit, with the large number of students today at the Missionary Institute and the thriving Teachers' Training College (ESS), Wellington once again occupies a strategic position in our church and educational life. That its responsibilities may outweigh its privileges and opportunities in order to remain faithful to its rich past and to be a source of strength for the future for the coming of the Kingdom of God and the glorification of the Name that is above all names, is the sincere desire of the pastors, church council and congregation!"

Two daughter congregations were later established in the town: Wellington North in 1957 and Wellington East in 1973. These are the only secessions from the old mother congregation. Together, these three congregations had 993 baptized and 3 738 professing members at the end of 2014, making it one of the largest concentrations of NG members in any town in South Africa and even more than in cities such as Welkom, East London and Pietermaritzburg. Because Wellington is an attractive place to live even for people working in Cape Town, the number of professing members has increased from 3 491 by almost 250 or about 7 percent in the past 30 years, compared to a decrease in the entire NG Church of almost 20 percent.

== Ministers ==
- Andries Francois du Toit, 1840 – February 26, 1871 (first minister; died in office; his only congregation)
- Andrew Murray, 1871 – 1910
- Daniel Gerhardus Malan, 1906 – 1918
- Willem Nicolaas van der Merwe, 1921 – 1926
- Daniël Stephanus Burger Joubert, 1925 – 1934
- Jan Hendrik Malan Stofberg, 1935 – 1939
- Evert Johannes du Toit, 1939 – 1950 (later first rector of the Huguenot College)
- David Willem de Villiers, 1944 – 1947
- Johannes Gert Stefanus van Jaarsveld, 1948 – 1958
- Willem Adolph Alheit, 1951 – 1955
- Lieb Johannes Loots, 1957 – 1960
- Dawie de Villiers, 1967 – 1969
- Willem Jacob Botha Cloete, 1970 – 1973
