= Bertha Stoneman =

Botanist (1866-1943)

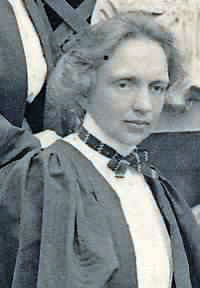
- Education: Cornell University
- Occupations: botanist and university professor
- Employer: Huguenot College
- Works: Plants and their ways in South Africa
- Scientific career
- Notable students: Olive Coates Palgrave; Ethel Doidge

Bertha Stoneman (August 18, 1866 – April 30, 1943) was an American-born South African botanist. She was president of Huguenot College from 1921 to 1933, and founder of the South African Association of University Women.

== Early life and education ==
Bertha Stoneman was born on a farm near Jamestown, New York, the daughter of Byron Stoneman and Mary Jane Markaham Stoneman. Her aunt, Kate Stoneman, was the first woman admitted to the New York State bar, and her uncle George Stoneman was a general in the American Civil War and later governor of California. Bertha Stoneman completed undergraduate and doctoral studies in botany at Cornell University in 1894 and 1896, respectively. Her dissertation research involved anthracnoses.

== Career ==
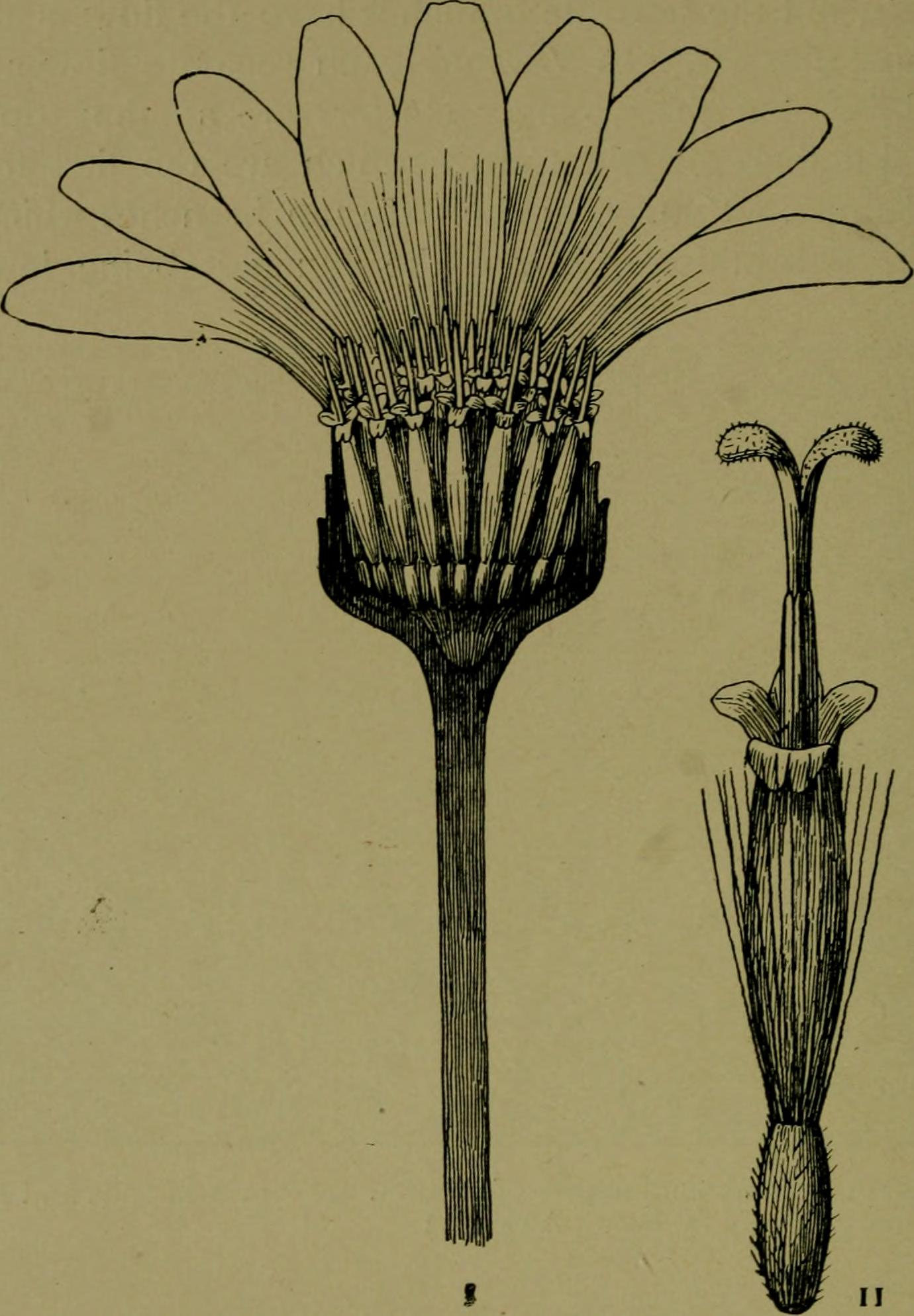
an illustration from Bertha Stoneman, Plants and their ways in South Africa (1915) (14773569171)

After graduate school, she accepted a position as head of the botany department at Huguenot College, a women's college in Wellington, South Africa. She started Huguenot's herbarium developed its plant collection, and taught courses in psychology and logic as well as botany. In 1923 she founded the South African Federation of University Women, and served as its first president. She became president of Huguenot University College in 1921, and retired from that position in 1933. Stoneman's textbook, Plants and their Ways in South Africa (1906), was a widely assigned text in South African schools, for several decades. Among her notable students were Olive Coates Palgrave and Ethel Doidge.

The standard author abbreviation Stoneman is used to indicate this person as the author when citing a botanical name.

== Personal life ==
Stoneman died at home in South Africa in 1943, aged 76 years. Her papers are archived at Cornell University. There is a botany laboratory at the University of Pretoria named for Stoneman, and the South African Association of Women Graduates awards an annual fellowship in her name.
