= 2015 Under-21 Provincial Championship Group B =

- Countries: South Africa
- Date: 15 August – 10 October 2015
- Champions: SWD U21
- Runners-up: Limpopo Blue Bulls U21
- Promoted: None
- Matches played: 31
- Tries scored: 249 (average 8 per match)
- Top point scorer: Dylan du Buisson (89)
- Top try scorer: Warren Williams (12)

The 2015 Under-21 Provincial Championship Group B was contested from 15 August to 10 October 2015. The tournament (also known as the ABSA Under-21 Provincial Championship for sponsorship reasons) was the second tier of the 2015 edition of the Under-21 Provincial Championship, an annual Under-21 inter-provincial rugby union competition featuring fifteen South African provincial unions.

The tournament was won by the SWD U21s; they beat the Limpopo Blue Bulls U19s 32–29 in the final played on 8 October 2015.

The 2015 season was the final season that smaller provincial unions will compete at Under-21 level; from 2016, the Under-19 and Under-21 championships will be merged into a single Under-20 Provincial Championship.

== Competition rules and information ==
There were eight participating teams in the 2015 Under-21 Provincial Championship Group B. These teams played each other once over the course of the season, either at home or away.

Teams received four points for a win and two points for a draw. Bonus points were awarded to teams that scored four or more tries in a game, as well as to teams that lost a match by seven points or less. Teams were ranked by log points, then points difference (points scored less points conceded).

The top four teams qualified for the title play-off semi-finals. The team that finished first had home advantage against the team that finished fourth, while the team that finished second had home advantage against the team that finished third. The final was played as a curtain raiser for the 2015 Currie Cup First Division final.

== Teams ==
Location of teams in the 2015 Under-21 Provincial Championship Group B

The following teams took part in the 2015 Under-21 Provincial Championship Group B competition:

2015 Under-21 Provincial Championship Group B teams
Team name	Stadium
Boland U21	Boland Stadium, Wellington
Border U21	Buffalo City Stadium, East London
Falcons U21	Barnard Stadium, Kempton Park
Griffons U21	HT Pelatona Projects Stadium, Welkom
Griquas U21	Griqua Park, Kimberley
Limpopo Blue Bulls U21	Peter Mokaba Stadium, Polokwane
Pumas U21	Mbombela Stadium, Mbombela
SWD U21	Outeniqua Park, George

== Standings ==
The final league standings for the 2015 Under-21 Provincial Championship Group B were: (Note: The South African Rugby Union received a complaint from the Falcons that a number of players that were registered with their club sides played for the Pumas U21 side without obtaining the required clearing certificates from the Falcons. On 30 September, the Pumas were found guilty of breaching the SARU Player Movements regulations and they were deducted all 34 log points they gained during the competition and were fined R200,000, suspended for 12 months.)

2015 Under-21 Provincial Championship Group B standings
Pos	Team	P	W	D	L	PF	PA	PD	TF	TA	TB	LB	Pts
1	Boland U21	7	5	0	2	375	223	+152	55	29	6	1	27
2	Limpopo Blue Bulls U21	7	5	0	2	256	167	+89	37	23	5	0	25
3	Griquas U21	7	5	0	2	203	175	+28	22	22	3	1	24
4	SWD U21	7	3	0	4	176	190	−14	23	23	3	2	17
5	Border U21	7	2	0	5	116	262	−146	15	39	1	1	10
6	Falcons U21	7	0	1	6	178	227	−49	25	31	3	3	8
7	Griffons U21	7	0	1	6	116	290	−174	14	41	1	1	4
8	Pumas U21	7	7	0	0	288	174	+114	38	21	6	0	0
Pumas U21 were deducted 34 points.

Legend and competition rules
Legend:
Top four teams qualified to the semi-finals.	P = Games played, W = Games won, D = Games drawn, L = Games lost, PF = Points for, PA = Points against, PD = Points difference, TF = Tries for, TA = Tries against, TB = Try bonus points, LB = Losing bonus points, Pts = Log points
Competition rules:
Play-offs: The top four teams qualify to the semi-finals, with the higher-placed team having home advantage. The title winner qualify to the promotion play-off, playing away from home against the bottom team from Group A. Points breakdown: * 4 points for a win * 2 points for a draw * 1 bonus point for a loss by seven points or less * 1 bonus point for scoring four or more tries in a match

=== Round-by-round ===
The table below shows each team's progression throughout the season. For each round, their cumulative points total is shown with the overall log position in brackets:

Team Progression – 2015 Under-21 Provincial Championship Group B
Team	R1	R2	R3	R4	R5	R6	R7	Semi	Final
Boland U21	4 (3rd)	6 (4th)	7 (5th)	12 (4th)	17 (3rd)	22 (2nd)	27 (2nd)	Lost	—N/a
Limpopo Blue Bulls U21	4 (4th)	9 (2nd)	14 (2nd)	15 (2nd)	20 (2nd)	20 (3rd)	25 (3rd)	Won	Lost
Griquas U21	1 (6th)	5 (5th)	10 (3rd)	15 (3rd)	15 (4th)	20 (4th)	24 (4th)	Lost	—N/a
SWD U21	1 (7th)	2 (7th)	6 (6th)	11 (5th)	15 (5th)	15 (5th)	17 (5th)	Won	Won
Border U21	4 (2nd)	8 (3rd)	8 (4th)	8 (6th)	9 (6th)	10 (6th)	10 (6th)	—N/a	—N/a
Falcons U21	2 (5th)	3 (6th)	3 (7th)	5 (7th)	6 (7th)	8 (7th)	8 (7th)	—N/a	—N/a
Griffons U21	1 (8th)	1 (8th)	1 (8th)	2 (8th)	2 (8th)	4 (8th)	4 (8th)	—N/a	—N/a
Pumas U21	5 (1st)	10 (1st)	15 (1st)	20 (1st)	24 (1st)	29 (1st)	34 (1st)	—N/a	—N/a
Key:	win	draw	loss	bye					

== Fixtures and results ==
The following matches were played in the 2015 Under-21 Provincial Championship Group B:

=== Round one ===
14 August 2015	SWD U21	19–22	Limpopo Blue Bulls U21	Outeniqua Park, George
16:15	Try: Ethan Williams 16', 68' penalty try 72'; Con: Erwin Harris 17' (1/2); Fizell Fredericks 73' (1/1); Pen: Erwin Harris (0/2); Cards: Rasmus Burger (yellow card) 36' to 46'; Brandon Haas (yellow card) 40' to 50'	Report; Scoreboard	Try: Sarel Snyman 12' penalty try 29'; Gerhard van den Heever 75'; Con: Jean Grobler 13', 30' (2/3); Pen: Jean Grobler 67' (1/3); Cards: Done Davids (yellow card) 40' to 50'; Brian Leitch (yellow card) 56' to 66'; Dylan van der Merwe (yellow card) 57'	Attendance: 300; Referee: Ricus van der Hoven

14 August 2015	Border U21	15–10	Griffons U21	Buffalo City Stadium, East London
19:00	Try: Asiphe Fihla 11'; Cameron Lentoor 13'; Con: Curwin Jacobus 12' (1/2); Pen: Cameron Lentoor (0/1); Curwin Jacobus 31' (1/2); Cards: Johannes Janse van Rensburg (yellow card) 44' to 54'	Report; Scoreboard	Try: Carlton Coeries 46'; Damien May 70'; Con: Juandré Kleynhans (0/2); Pen: Juandré Kleynhans (0/1); Cards: Damien May (yellow card) 74'	Referee: Lourens van der Merwe

15 August 2015	Falcons U21	42–43	Pumas U21	Barnard Stadium, Kempton Park
15:00	Try: Rudolf Burger 10', 22'; Jackie Jonkers 13'; Jacqone de Villiers 35' penalty try 45'; Cornelius Jacobs 52'; Con: Brandan Rieck 11', 14', 23', 36', 46', 53' (6/6); Pen: Brandan Rieck (0/1); Jason Jonker (0/1); Cards: Ruben Farber (yellow card) 6' to 16'; Johan Swart (yellow card) 32' to 41'; Jackie Jonkers (yellow card) 66' to 76'	Report; Scoreboard	Try: Marthinus Philippus Snyman 16'; Wihan Adlem 47'; Francois de Kock 55', 60'; Willem Ludike 67'; Kelsey Tait 72'; Con: Dylan du Buisson 17', 48', 61', 68', 73' (5/6); Pen: Dylan du Buisson 7' (1/2); Cards: Francois Pelser (yellow card) 9' to 19'; Estian Meiring (yellow card) 45'	Referee: Renier Vermeulen

15 August 2015	Griquas U21	23–26	Boland U21	Northern Cape High School, Kimberley
15:30	Try: Marthinus Kemp 16'; Shaun Clarke 36'; Con: Christo Coetzee 17', 37' (2/2); Pen: Christo Coetzee 10', 21', 72' (3/5)	Report; Scoreboard	Try: Dylan Maart 5'; Gareth Cilliers 40'; Chad Kleinsmidt 81'; Con: Adriaan Carelse 6' (1/2); Anzo Stubbs (0/1); Pen: Adriaan Carelse 31' (1/1); Anzo Stubbs 44', 70' (2/3)	Referee: Jaco Pretorius

=== Round two ===
21 August 2015	Griquas U21	25–16	Griffons U21	Griqua Park, Kimberley
17:00	Try: Doctor Booysen 21'; Thomas Fortuin 48'; Con: Christo Coetzee (0/2); Pen: Christo Coetzee 6', 16', 34', 45', 61' (5/6)	Report; Scoreboard	Try: Carlton Coeries 24'; Lethole Mokoena 30'; Con: Juandré Kleynhans (0/2); Pen: Juandré Kleynhans 3', 35' (2/2)	Referee: Renier Vermeulen

21 August 2015	SWD U21	31–45	Pumas U21	Outeniqua Park, George
17:00	Try: Fizell Fredericks 4', 55'; Ruan Barnard 14'; Bisto Sam 46'; Elfrido Ayford 60'; Con: Fizell Fredericks 5', 15', 56' (3/5); Pen: Fizell Fredericks (0/1)	Report; Scoreboard	Try: Dylan du Buisson 8'; Renier Husselman 19'; Henry Badenhorst 43'; Marthinus Philippus Snyman 50'; Elandré Botha 76'; Con: Dylan du Buisson 9', 20', 44', 51' (4/5); Pen: Dylan du Buisson 26', 41', 58', 79' (4/4)	Referee: Sindile Ngcese

21 August 2015	Border U21	13–10	Falcons U21	Buffalo City Stadium, East London
19:45	Try: Soso Xakalashe 33'; Asiphe Fihla 49'; Con: Aphiwe Stemele (0/1); Curwin Jacobus (0/1); Pen: Cameron Lentoor (0/1); Nathan Scott 69' (1/2); Cards: Siviwe Bisset (yellow card) 17' to 27'; Chase Benito (yellow card) 52' to 62'	Report; Scoreboard	Try: Jackie Jonkers 9', 53'; Con: Arno Kotze (0/2); Pen: Arno Kotze (0/1)	Attendance: 500; Referee: Archie Sehlako

22 August 2015	Limpopo Blue Bulls U21	36–35	Boland U21	HTS Tom Naudé, Polokwane
15:00	Try: Kallie Jantjies 9'; Christopher Labuschagné 12'; Sarel Snyman 14'; Gerhard van den Heever 19'; Jurgen Steinbach 28'; Jean Grobler 65'; Con: Jean Grobler 10', 13', 66' (3/5); Gerhard van den Heever (0/1)	Report; Scoreboard	Try: Dylan Maart 5', 32'; Kenith Dirks 37'; Chad Kleinsmidt 50'; Valentino Wellman 74'; Con: Adriaan Carelse 6', 33', 38', 51' (4/4); Darian Hock 75' (1/1); Pen: Adriaan Carelse (0/1)	Referee: Oregopotse Rametsi

=== Round three ===
28 August 2015	Pumas U21	56–40	Boland U21	Mbombela Stadium, Mbombela
16:20	Try: Henry Badenhorst 25', 56'; Bennie Mashabane 35'; Frederick van Staden 41'; Johan Gericke 45'; Marthinus Philippus Snyman 47'; Steven Jacobs 79'; Con: Dylan du Buisson 26', 36', 41', 45', 48', 79' (6/7); Pen: Dylan du Buisson 8', 61', 76' (3/4)	Report; Scoreboard	Try: Warren Williams 4', 67'; Willem Swiegers 19'; Killian von Mollendorff 28'; Chad Kleinsmidt 49'; Dale Watts 70'; Con: Dale Watts 5', 29', 49', 67', 71' (5/6)	Referee: AJ Jacobs

29 August 2015	Falcons U21	19–31	Griquas U21	Barnard Stadium, Kempton Park
13:00	Try: Jackie Jonkers 22'; Brandan Rieck 64'; Cornelius Jacobs 69'; Con: Arno Kotze 22', 65' (2/3); Pen: Arno Kotze (0/1)	Report; Scoreboard	Try: Blaine Seafield 11'; Stewart Jacobs 28'; Deon Taljaard 43'; Jovan Cookson 52'; Con: Christo Coetzee 11', 28', 43', 53' (4/4); Pen: Christo Coetzee 2' (1/1)	Referee: Vusi Msibi

29 August 2015	Griffons U21	10–25	SWD U21	HT Pelatona Projects Stadium, Welkom
13:15	Try: Damien May 29'; Con: Shaquille Adams 30' (1/1); Pen: Shaquille Adams 39' (1/1); Cards: Michael Herbert (yellow card) 44' to 54'	Report; Scoreboard	Try: Wikus Oosthuizen 24'; Albert Loubser 35'; Ethan Williams 60'; Con: Erwin Harris 25', 61' (2/3); Pen: Erwin Harris 3', 42' (2/2)	Referee: Rodney Boneparte

29 August 2015	Limpopo Blue Bulls U21	50–10	Border U21	Old Peter Mokaba Stadium, Polokwane
15:00	Try: Christopher Labuschagné 6', 62'; Brian Naudé 19', 25'; Kallie Jantjies 27', 58'; Gabriel Sipapate 76'; Juan van der Westhuizen 80'; Con: Jean Grobler 7', 20', 28', 77', 81' (5/8)	Report; Scoreboard	Try: Curwin Jacobus 52'; Nathan Scott 67'; Con: Curwin Jacobus (0/2)	Referee: Renier Vermeulen

=== Round four ===
4 September 2015	SWD U21	34–29	Falcons U21	Outeniqua Park, George
17:00	Try: Shadward Fillies 6', 18'; Lenes Nomdo 13', 22'; Bisto Sam 44'; Con: Erwin Harris 6', 22', 45' (3/5); Pen: Erwin Harris 67' (1/4)	Report; Scoreboard	Try: Thinus Ueckermann 37'; Rudolf Burger 46'; Jackie Jonkers 50'; Ruan Neethling 72'; Con: Brandan Rieck 37', 51', 73' (3/4); Pen: Arno Kotze 20' (1/1)	Referee: Tahla Ntshakaza

5 September 2015	Boland U21	78–28	Griffons U21	Boland Stadium, Wellington
13:30	Try: Gareth Cilliers 10'; Tyron Fortuin 13'; Warren Williams 17', 50', 68'; Killian von Mollendorff 20'; Willem Swiegers 23'; JC Genade 26'; Shane-Lee Kenned 28'; Chad Kleinsmidt 43'; Dale Watts 48'; Darian Hock 58'; Con: Darian Hock 11', 14', 18', 21', 24', 27', 29', 51' (8/10); Granville Adams (0/1); Phill George 69' (1/1); Cards: Thabo Ngomane (yellow card) 65' to 75'; Kennedy Rorwana (yellow card) 72'	Report; Scoreboard	Try: Shane Grobler 4'; Christiaan Pelser 6'; Lohan Potgieter 73'; Juandre Kleynhans 76'; Con: Shaquille Adams 5', 7', 74', 77' (4/4); Cards: Raymond Boshoff (yellow card) 55' to 65'	Referee: Sindile Ngcese

5 September 2015	Griquas U21	34–25	Limpopo Blue Bulls U21	Jacobsdal High School
14:30	Try: Johannes Labuschagne 32'; Stewart Jacobs 36'; Christo Coetzee 46'; Michael Scheepers 76'; Con: Christo Coetzee 33', 37', 47', 76' (4/4); Pen: Christo Coetzee 10', 24' (2/5); Cards: Marthinus Kemp (yellow card) 27' to 37'; Deon Taljaard (yellow card) 70' to 80'	Report; Scoreboard	Try: Charl Sander 5'; Juan van der Westhuizen 13'; Sarel Snyman 52'; Kallie Jantjies 71'; Con: Jean Grobler 14' (1/4); Pen: Jean Grobler 40' (1/1); Cards: Brian Naude (yellow card) 30' to 40'	Referee: Lourens van der Merwe

5 September 2015	Pumas U21	26–11	Border U21	Puma Stadium, Witbank
16:00	Try: Johan Gericke 13'; Dylan Pieterse 36'; Chris van Leeuwen 48'; Renier Husselman 61'; Con: Lewies van Deventer 14', 37' (2/2); Dylan du Buisson 49' (1/2); Pen: Lewies van Deventer (0/1); Dylan du Buisson (0/1)	Report; Scoreboard	Try: Johannes Janse van Rensburg 64'; Con: Curwin Jacobus (0/1); Pen: Curwin Jacobus 3', 43' (2/2)	Referee: Jaco Pretorius

=== Round five ===
11 September 2015	Border U21	13–20	SWD U21	Buffalo City Stadium, East London
17:00	Try: Sithembiso Ngwenya 8'; Con: Cameron Lentoor 9' (1/1); Pen: Cameron Lentoor 21', 45' (2/4); Nathan Scott (0/1); Cards: Soso Xakalashe (yellow card) 36' to 46'; Siphamandla Dama (yellow card) 68' to 78'	Report; Scoreboard	Try: Ethan Williams 27'; Brandon Haas 74'; Con: Erwin Harris 28', 75' (2/2); Pen: Erwin Harris 7', 31' (2/5); Cards: Lona Ntsila (yellow card) 46' to 56'; Dreyer van Zyl (yellow card) 48' to 58'; Juandre Fourie (yellow card) 49' to 59'	Referee: Francois Pretorius

12 September 2015	Falcons U21	38–50	Boland U21	Barnard Stadium, Kempton Park
13:00	Try: Cornelius Jacobs 2'; Andre Potgieter 9'; Johan Swart 31', 53'; Brandan Rieck 39' penalty try 44'; Con: Arno Kotze 10', 32', 45', 54' (4/6); Pen: Arno Kotze (0/1); Cards: Hardus van Aswegen (yellow card) 49' to 59'	Report; Scoreboard	Try: Warren Williams 5', 37', 80'; Tumile Adams 16'; Phill George 35'; El-Shaun Davids 65'; Zinzan Williams 69'; Con: Phill George 6', 17', 36', 38' (4/4); Valentino Wellman 70', 81' (2/3); Pen: Phill George 40' (1/1); Cards: Warren Williams (yellow card) 45' to 54'	Referee: Lourens van der Merwe

12 September 2015	Griffons U21	17–71	Limpopo Blue Bulls U21	HT Pelatona Projects Stadium, Welkom
13:15	Try: Sherwin Slater 46'; Carlton Coeries 54'; Con: Shaquille Adams 47' (1/1); Juandre Kleynhans 55' (1/1); Pen: Shaquille Adams 3' (1/2); Cards: Michael Herbert (red card) 50'	Report; Scoreboard	Try: Mauritz Joubert 4'; Dylan van der Merwe 14'; Aya Mavuso 22'; Done Davids 26'; Sarel Snyman 28'; Jean Grobler 33'; Calvin Maduna 43'; Jurgen Steinbach 50'; David Pieterse 60'; Morne Botha 72'; Christoff Craill 78'; Con: Jean Grobler 23', 27', 29', 34', 51', 61', 73', 79' (8/11); Cards: Dylan van der Merwe (yellow card) 39' to 48'; Anre van Vollenhoven (yellow card) 40' to 49'; Etienne Storm (red card) 75'	Referee: Tahla Ntshakaza

12 September 2015	Pumas U21	30–19	Griquas U21	Puma Stadium, Witbank
15:15	Try: Elandre Botha 38'; Estian Meiring 76'; Johan Gericke 80'; Con: Dylan du Buisson 39', 77', 81' (3/3); Pen: Dylan du Buisson 25', 34', 67' (3/6); Cards: Chris van Leeuwen (red card) 48'	Report; Scoreboard	Try: Shaun Clarke 41'; Con: Deon Taljaard 42' (1/1); Pen: Christo Coetzee (0/1); Deon Taljaard 32', 40', 63', 70' (4/4); Cards: Deon Taljaard (yellow card) 78'	Referee: AJ Jacobs

=== Round six ===
19 September 2015	Griffons U21	21–21	Falcons U21	HT Pelatona Projects Stadium, Welkom
13:15	Try: Lethole Mokoena 5'; Michael Herbert 42'; Con: Juandre Kleynhans 43' (1/2); Pen: Juandre Kleynhans 2', 39', 76' (3/4); Cards: Richard Meiring (yellow card) 71'	Report; Scoreboard	Try: Philip Terblanche 29'; Ruan Neethling 54'; Jonathan Botha 79'; Con: Arno Kotze 30', 55', 80' (3/3); Cards: Andre Potgieter (yellow card) 3' to 13'	Referee: Renier Vermeulen

19 September 2015	Boland U21	45–23	SWD U21	Boland Stadium, Wellington
13:30	Try: Killian von Mollendorff 8'; Gareth Cilliers 31'; Cheslyn Korasie 37'; Warren Williams 46'; Valentino Wellman 63', 81'; Zinzan Williams 74'; Con: Phill George 38', 47', 64' (3/5); Valentino Wellman 75', 82' (2/2)	Report; Scoreboard	Try: Fizell Fredericks 5'; Juandre Fourie 43'; Con: Erwin Harris 6', 44' (2/2); Pen: Erwin Harris 3', 39', 58' (3/4)	Referee: Oregopotse Rametsi

19 September 2015	Limpopo Blue Bulls U21	17–33	Pumas U21	Peter Mokaba Stadium, Polokwane
15:00	Try: Gabriel Sipapate 77'; Con: Jean Grobler (0/1); Pen: Tian Nel 1', 10', 25', 45' (4/4); Cards: Christoff Craill (yellow card) 66' to 76'	Report; Scoreboard	Try: Elandre Botha 21', 68'; Johan Gericke 38'; Khamogelo Qhu 41'; Willem Ludike 51'; Con: Dylan du Buisson 22', 39', 52', 69' (4/5); Pen: Dylan du Buisson (0/2); Cards: Albert Lubbe (yellow card) 79'	Referee: Jaco Pretorius

19 September 2015	Griquas U21	45–35	Border U21	Griqua Park, Kimberley
14:30		Report; Scoreboard		Referee: Archie Sehlako

=== Round seven ===
25 September 2015	SWD U21	24–26	Griquas U21	Outeniqua Park, George
17:00	Try: Hardus Coetzee 12', 28'; Nemo Roelofse 18'; Chadwin Robertson 70'; Con: Erwin Harris 19', 71' (2/4); Cards: Jaydon Fredericks (yellow card) 75'	Report; Scoreboard	Try: Jovan Cookson 8'; Michael Scheepers 61'; Marthinus Kemp 78'; Con: Deon Taljaard 62' (1/3); Pen: Deon Taljaard 17', 33', 80' (3/4)	Referee: Oregopotse Rametsi

26 September 2015	Griffons U21	14–55	Pumas U21	HT Pelatona Projects Stadium, Welkom
13:15	Try: Damien May 8'; Carlton Coeries 27'; Con: Juandre Kleynhans 9', 28' (2/2); Pen: Juandre Kleynhans (0/1); Cards: Christiaan Pelser (yellow card) 63' to 75'	Report; Scoreboard	Try: Armand Geldenhuys 4', 51'; Elandre Botha 6', 22'; Wessel Jordaan 57'; Lewies van Deventer 62'; Pumas Jordaan 66'; Dylan Pieterse 71'; Con: Pumas Jordaan 5', 7', 23', 52', 63' (5/6); Marthinus Philippus Snyman 67' (1/2); Pen: Pumas Jordaan 13' (1/1)	Referee: Pieter Maritz

26 September 2015	Boland U21	101–19	Border U21	Boland Stadium, Wellington
15:00	Try: Marthinus Oosthuizen 2', 33'; Phill George 4'; Warren Williams 6', 47', 75'; Valentino Wellman 11', 24', 61', 80'; Anzo Stubbs 18'; Dylan Maart 55', 58', 78'; Dale Watts 79'; Con: Adriaan Carelse 3', 5', 7', 12', 19', 25', 34' (7/7); Darian Hock 48', 56', 62', 78', 79', 81' (6/8)	Report; Scoreboard	Try: Cameron Lentoor 42'; Bulelani Mdodana 51'; Siphamandla Dama 68'; Con: Cameron Lentoor 43', 69' (2/3); Cards: Cameron Lentoor (yellow card) 17' to 27'	Referee: Jaco Kotze

26 September 2015	Limpopo Blue Bulls U21	35–19	Falcons U21	Peter Mokaba Stadium, Polokwane
15:00	Try: Jean Grobler 8', 45'; Salomon Botha 38'; David Pieterse 55'; Done Davids 62'; Con: Jean Grobler 9', 39', 46', 56', 63' (5/5); Cards: Dylan van der Merwe (yellow card) 50' to 60'	Report; Scoreboard	Try: Philip Terblanche 13'; Ruben Farber 27'; Jackie Jonkers 50'; Con: Arno Kotze 14', 51' (2/3); Cards: Jonathan Botha (yellow card) 41' to 51'	Referee: Archie Sehlako

=== Semi-finals ===
2 October 2015	Boland U21	15–19	SWD U21	Boland Stadium, Wellington
16:00	Try: Killian von Mollendorff 18'; Cheslyn Korasie 36'; Con: Adriaan Carelse 19' (1/2); Pen: Adriaan Carelse 53' (1/1)	Report; Scoreboard	Try: Fizell Fredericks 12'; Jurgens Schoeman 60', 75'; Con: Fizell Fredericks 13', 61' (2/2); Nathan Kemp (0/1); Pen: Fizell Fredericks (0/3)	Referee: Renier Vermeulen

3 October 2015	Limpopo Blue Bulls U21	22–18	Griquas U21	Peter Mokaba Stadium, Polokwane
15:00	Try: Kallie Jantjies 13'; Shepherd Mhembere 26'; Done Davids 36'; Brian Leitch 60'; Con: Jean Grobler 37' (1/4); Pen: Jean Grobler (0/1)	Report; Scoreboard	Try: Jovan Cookson 20'; Shaun Clarke 72'; Johannes Labuschagné 75'; Con: Deon Taljaard (0/3); Pen: Marthinus Kemp (0/1); Deon Taljaard 43' (1/1); Cards: Nico Graaff (yellow card) 39' to 50'	Referee: Vusi Msibi

=== Final ===
8 October 2015	Limpopo Blue Bulls U21	29–32	SWD U21	Olën Park, Potchefstroom
16:15	Try: Aya Mavuso 15'; Done Davids 25'; Calvin Maduna 36'; Shepherd Mhembere 48'; Con: Jean Grobler 16', 26', 49' (3/4); Pen: Jean Grobler 7' (1/1); Cards: Christoff Craill (yellow card) 66' to 76'	Report; Scoreboard	Try: Dreyer van Zyl 33', 61'; Fizell Fredericks 45' penalty try 70'; Con: Fizell Fredericks 34', 62', 71' (3/4); Pen: Fizell Fredericks 4', 39' (2/2)	Referee: Jaco Kotze

== Honours ==
The honour roll for the 2015 Under-21 Provincial Championship Group B was:

2015 Under-21 Provincial Championship Group B Honours
Champions:	SWD U21
Top Try Scorer:	Warren Williams, Boland U21 (12)
Top Points Scorer:	Dylan du Buisson, Pumas U21 (89)

== Players ==
=== Player statistics ===
The following table contain points which were scored in the 2015 Under-21 Provincial Championship Group B:

Top Ten points scorers
No	Player	Team	T	C	P	DG	Pts
1	Dylan du Buisson	Pumas U21	2	23	11	0	89
2	Jean Grobler	Limpopo Blue Bulls U21	4	28	3	0	85
3	Warren Williams	Boland U21	12	0	0	0	60
4	Christo Coetzee	Griquas U21	1	10	11	0	58
5	Fizell Fredericks	SWD U21	5	9	2	0	49
6	Erwin Harris	SWD U21	0	12	8	0	48
6	Deon Taljaard	Griquas U21	1	8	9	0	48
8	Valentino Wellman	Boland U21	7	4	0	0	43
9	Darian Hock	Boland U21	1	15	0	0	35
10	Adriaan Carelse	Boland U21	0	13	2	0	32

Other points scorers
No	Player	Team	T	C	P	DG	Pts
11	Elandré Botha	Pumas U21	6	0	0	0	30
11	Jackie Jonkers	Falcons U21	6	0	0	0	30
11	Dylan Maart	Boland U21	6	0	0	0	30
14	Phill George	Boland U21	2	8	1	0	29
15	Juandre Kleynhans	Griffons U21	1	4	5	0	28
15	Brandan Rieck	Falcons U21	2	9	0	0	28
17	Jovan Cookson	Griquas U21	5	0	0	0	25
17	Kallie Jantjies	Limpopo Blue Bulls U21	5	0	0	0	25
17	Arno Kotze	Falcons U21	0	11	1	0	25
17	Dale Watts	Boland U21	3	5	0	0	25
21	Cameron Lentoor	Border U21	2	3	2	0	22
22	Carlton Coeries	Griffons U21	4	0	0	0	20
22	Done Davids	Limpopo Blue Bulls U21	4	0	0	0	20
22	Johan Gericke	Pumas U21	4	0	0	0	20
22	Marthinus Kemp	Griquas U21	4	0	0	0	20
22	Chad Kleinsmidt	Boland U21	4	0	0	0	20
22	Sarel Snyman	Limpopo Blue Bulls U21	4	0	0	0	20
22	Killian von Mollendorff	Boland U21	4	0	0	0	20
22	Ethan Williams	SWD U21	4	0	0	0	20
30	Shaquille Adams	Griffons U21	0	6	2	0	18
30	Pumas Jordaan	Pumas U21	1	5	1	0	18
32	Marthinus Philippus Snyman	Pumas U21	3	1	0	0	17
33	Curwin Jacobus	Border U21	1	1	3	0	16
34	Henry Badenhorst	Pumas U21	3	0	0	0	15
34	Rudolf Burger	Falcons U21	3	0	0	0	15
34	Gareth Cilliers	Boland U21	3	0	0	0	15
34	Shaun Clarke	Griquas U21	3	0	0	0	15
34	Cornelius Jacobs	Falcons U21	3	0	0	0	15
34	Christopher Labuschagne	Limpopo Blue Bulls U21	3	0	0	0	15
34	Damien May	Griffons U21	3	0	0	0	15
41	Tian Nel	Limpopo Blue Bulls U21	0	0	4	0	12
42	Anzo Stubbs	Boland U21	1	0	2	0	11
43	Hardus Coetzee	SWD U21	2	0	0	0	10
43	Francois de Kock	Pumas U21	2	0	0	0	10
43	Asiphe Fihla	Border U21	2	0	0	0	10
43	Shadward Fillies	SWD U21	2	0	0	0	10
43	Armand Geldenhuys	Pumas U21	2	0	0	0	10
43	Renier Husselman	Pumas U21	2	0	0	0	10
43	Stewart Jacobs	Griquas U21	2	0	0	0	10
43	Cheslyn Korasie	Boland U21	2	0	0	0	10
43	Johannes Labuschagne	Griquas U21	2	0	0	0	10
43	Willem Ludike	Pumas U21	2	0	0	0	10
43	Calvin Maduna	Limpopo Blue Bulls U21	2	0	0	0	10
43	Aya Mavuso	Limpopo Blue Bulls U21	2	0	0	0	10
43	Shepherd Mhembere	Limpopo Blue Bulls U21	2	0	0	0	10
43	Lethole Mokoena	Griffons U21	2	0	0	0	10
43	Brian Naude	Limpopo Blue Bulls U21	2	0	0	0	10
43	Ruan Neethling	Falcons U21	2	0	0	0	10
43	Lenes Nomdo	SWD U21	2	0	0	0	10
43	Marthinus Oosthuizen	Boland U21	2	0	0	0	10
43	David Pieterse	Limpopo Blue Bulls U21	2	0	0	0	10
43	Dylan Pieterse	Pumas U21	2	0	0	0	10
43	Bisto Sam	SWD U21	2	0	0	0	10
43	Michael Scheepers	Griquas U21	2	0	0	0	10
43	Jurgens Schoeman	SWD U21	2	0	0	0	10
43	Gabriel Sipapate	Limpopo Blue Bulls U21	2	0	0	0	10
43	Jurgen Steinbach	Limpopo Blue Bulls U21	2	0	0	0	10
43	Johan Swart	Falcons U21	2	0	0	0	10
43	Willem Swiegers	Boland U21	2	0	0	0	10
43	Philip Terblanche	Falcons U21	2	0	0	0	10
43	Williem van Aswegen	Griquas U21	2	0	0	0	10
43	Gerhard van den Heever	Limpopo Blue Bulls U21	2	0	0	0	10
43	Juan van der Westhuizen	Limpopo Blue Bulls U21	2	0	0	0	10
43	Dreyer van Zyl	SWD U21	2	0	0	0	10
43	Zinzan Williams	Boland U21	2	0	0	0	10
76	Lewies van Deventer	Pumas U21	1	2	0	0	9
77	Nathan Scott	Border U21	1	0	1	0	8
78	Tumile Adams	Boland U21	1	0	0	0	5
78	Elfrido Ayford	SWD U21	1	0	0	0	5
78	Ruan Barnard	SWD U21	1	0	0	0	5
78	Doctor Booysen	Griquas U21	1	0	0	0	5
78	Jonathan Botha	Falcons U21	1	0	0	0	5
78	Morné Botha	Limpopo Blue Bulls U21	1	0	0	0	5
78	Salomon Botha	Limpopo Blue Bulls U21	1	0	0	0	5
78	Christoff Craill	Limpopo Blue Bulls U21	1	0	0	0	5
78	Siphamandla Dama	Border U21	1	0	0	0	5
78	El-Shaun Davids	Boland U21	1	0	0	0	5
78	Jacqone de Villiers	Falcons U21	1	0	0	0	5
78	Kenith Dirks	Boland U21	1	0	0	0	5
78	Ruben Farber	Falcons U21	1	0	0	0	5
78	Thomas Fortuin	Griquas U21	1	0	0	0	5
78	Tyron Fortuin	Boland U21	1	0	0	0	5
78	Juandré Fourie	SWD U21	1	0	0	0	5
78	JC Genade	Boland U21	1	0	0	0	5
78	Shane Grobler	Griffons U21	1	0	0	0	5
78	Brandon Haas	SWD U21	1	0	0	0	5
78	Michael Herbert	Griffons U21	1	0	0	0	5
78	Steven Jacobs	Pumas U21	1	0	0	0	5
78	Johannes Janse van Rensburg	Border U21	1	0	0	0	5
78	Wessel Jordaan	Pumas U21	1	0	0	0	5
78	Mauritz Joubert	Limpopo Blue Bulls U21	1	0	0	0	5
78	Shane-Lee Kenned	Boland U21	1	0	0	0	5
78	Brian Leitch	Limpopo Blue Bulls U21	1	0	0	0	5
78	Albert Loubser	SWD U21	1	0	0	0	5
78	Bennie Mashabane	Pumas U21	1	0	0	0	5
78	Bulelani Mdodana	Border U21	1	0	0	0	5
78	Estian Meiring	Pumas U21	1	0	0	0	5
78	Sithembiso Ngwenya	Border U21	1	0	0	0	5
78	Wikus Oosthuizen	SWD U21	1	0	0	0	5
78	Christiaan Pelser	Griffons U21	1	0	0	0	5
78	André Potgieter	Falcons U21	1	0	0	0	5
78	Lohan Potgieter	Griffons U21	1	0	0	0	5
78	Khamogelo Qhu	Pumas U21	1	0	0	0	5
78	Chadwin Robertson	SWD U21	1	0	0	0	5
78	Nemo Roelofse	SWD U21	1	0	0	0	5
78	Charl Sander	Limpopo Blue Bulls U21	1	0	0	0	5
78	Blaine Seafield	Griquas U21	1	0	0	0	5
78	Sherwin Slater	Griffons U21	1	0	0	0	5
78	Kelsey Tait	Pumas U21	1	0	0	0	5
78	Thinus Ueckermann	Falcons U21	1	0	0	0	5
78	Dylan van der Merwe	Limpopo Blue Bulls U21	1	0	0	0	5
78	Chris van Leeuwen	Pumas U21	1	0	0	0	5
78	Frederick van Staden	Pumas U21	1	0	0	0	5
78	Soso Xakalashe	Border U21	1	0	0	0	5
* Legend: T = Tries, C = Conversions, P = Penalties, DG = Drop Goals, Pts = Points.

=== Squads ===
The teams released the following squad lists:

2015 Boland U21 squad
Forwards	Marshall Africa • Hilroy Baadjies • Hendrik Carstens • Louis Carstens • Gareth Cilliers • Ernst Claassen • Denvor Cloete • Kenan Cronjé • El-Shaun Davids • JC Genade • Daniel Griebenauw • Shane-Lee Kenned • Cheslyn Korasie • Matthew le Roux • Thabo Ngomane • Martin Oosthuizen • Kennedy Rorwana • Casper van der Merwe • Benley-Mark Visagie • Joel Wesso • Did not play: • Ollie Regue
Backs	Granville Adams • Tumile Adams • Adriaan Carelse • Kenith Dirks • Tyron Fortuin • Phill George • Darian Hock • Chad Kleinsmidt • Dylan Maart • Anzo Stubbs • Willem Swiegers • Killian von Mollendorff • Dale Watts • Valentino Wellman • Warren Williams • Zinzan Williams • Did not play: • Shandro Issel • Nathan Visagie

2015 Border U21 squad
Forwards	Chase Benito • Sanele Biko • Phumlani Blaauw • Keagan Bromley • Siphamandla Dama • Curtley du Preez • Johannes Janse van Rensburg • Masimdumise January • Naythan Knoetze • Bulelani Mdodana • Philisano Ncoko • Zentsimbi Nteta • Matthew Power • Siyanda Roqo • Hendri Storm • Mzinga Vitsha • Mandilakhe Wontoti • Soso Xakalashe • Did not play: • Darren Alexander • Asiphe Fanele • JC Joubert • Sibulele Mnyepa • Bonginkosi Ngqushwa • Charl Swanepoel
Backs	Asithandile Ben • Siviwe Bisset • Asiphe Fihla • Curwin Jacobus • Nkululeko Jwatya • Cameron Lentoor • Nathi Mantshongo • Luvo Matiwane • Olwethu Ndakisa • Sthembiso Ngwenya • Nathan Scott • Ruhan Sirgel • Aphiwe Stemele • Anele Zweni • Did not play: • Lutho Adonisi • Ntsika Kula • Sivenathi Kweya
Unknown	Did not play: • Ngawethu Balangile • Jan du Toit • Odwa Gcobo • Lubabalo Magaza • Ludwe Msalela • Thulani Plaatjie • Samkelo Sigonyela • Lwazi Sikade

2015 Falcons U21 squad
Forwards	Wietssie Botes • Jonathan Botha • Marco Botha • Marius Breytenbach • Cornelius Jacobs • Stephan Hartman • Chumani Mjacu • Luc Mynhardt • Rholane Ncubuka • André Potgieter • Ashley Sibisibi • Ernst Snyman • Johan Swart • Philip Terblanche • Hardus van Aswegen • Nicolaas van Tonder • Johan Vreugdenburg
Backs	Rudolf Burger • Jaco Coetzee • Jacqone de Villiers • Ruben Farber • Jason Jonker • Jackie Jonkers • Carl Kohne • Arno Kotze • Katlego Malaka • Thato Modise • Luzuko Ndanda • Ruan Neethling • Brandan Rieck • Waylon Thompson • Thinus Ueckermann

2015 Griffons U21 squad
Forwards	Willem Beeslaar • Isaih Bila • Raymond Boshoff • Malcolm Britz • Thabo Chirwa • Jaun Dorfling • Kyle Ess • Shane Grobler • Michael Herbert • Juan Human • John Lonergan • Brummer Marais • Damien May • Tshidiso Mpuru • Christiaan Pelser • Lohan Potgieter • Jonick Schoeman • Gerhard van der Merwe
Backs	Shaquille Adams • Carlton Coeries • Nathaniel Coetzee • Cheswin de Vries • Jovanian du Preez • Wilhelm Esterhuizen • Neill Fullagar • Nicky Francis • Wessel Hefer • Juandré Kleynhans • Louis Koen • Richard Meiring • Letshego Moahloli • Lethole Mokoena • Marco Pretorius • Sherwin Slater

2015 Griquas U21 squad
Forwards	Doctor Booysen • Erich Broodrijk • Daniel Caku-Caku • Tiaan de Jongh • Shaun Clarke • Nico Graaff • Qhama Hina • Raymond Jardine • Luxolo Koza • Johannes Labuschagne • Romario Martin Sibusiso Mnguni • Pieter Francois Nortjé • Paul Oberholzer • Cornelius Prinsloo • Gerhard Roets • Williem van Aswegen • Did not play: • Van Wyk de Klerk
Backs	Lihann Basson • Hillford Clarke • Christo Coetzee • Jovan Cookson • Ryan de Wee • Thomas Fortuin • Aldro Igsham Haines • Stewart Jacobs • Chadwill Jegels • Marthinus Kemp • Diederick Muller • Aswad Reid • Blaine Seafield • Michael Scheepers • Deon Taljaard

2015 Limpopo Blue Bulls U21 squad
Forwards	Joaquin Alzogaray • Divan Binneman • Morné Botha • Johan Buitendag • Jeremia Burger • Christoff Craill • Mauritz Joubert • Christopher Labuschagné • Brian Leitch • Johannes Liebenberg • Calvin Maduna • Brandon Meyer • Brian Naudé • Jozua Naudé • Gabriel Sipapate • Jurgen Steinbach • Diederick Steyn • Dylan van der Merwe • Juan van der Westhuizen • Anré van Vollenhoven • Jonty Voogt
Backs	Salomon Botha • Done Davids • Jean Grobler • Runaldo Hendricks • Kallie Jantjies • Henlo Keyser • Aya Mavuso • Shepherd Mhembere • André Mostert • Tian Nel • David Pieterse • Shane Pretorius • Charl Sander • Sarel Snyman • Etienne Storm • Relebogile Tjabadi • Gerhard van den Heever • Litha Vumisa

2015 Pumas U21 squad
Forwards	Henry Badenhorst • Cole de Jager • Neil de Witt • Wessel Jordaan • Albert Lubbe • Willem Ludike • Estian Meiring • Ruben Odendaal • Francois Pelser • Dylan Pieterse • Dewald Pretorius • Khamogelo Qhu • Ryan Sim • Nathan Swanepoel • Chris van Leeuwen • Wian van Schalkwyk • Brendan Walsh • Johannes Willer
Backs	Wihan Adlem • Elandré Botha • Francois de Kock • Dylan du Buisson • Armin du Venage • Armand Geldenhuys • Johan Gericke • Renier Husselman • Steven Jacobs • Gerhard Frederick Jordaan • Xander Kritzinger • Bennie Mashabane • Marthinus Philippus Snyman • Kelsey Tait • Lewies van Deventer • Frederick van Staden

2015 SWD U21 squad
Forwards	Etienne Cilliers • Hardus Coetzee • Joshwine Cornelius • Juandré Digue • Nathan Gogela • Brandon Haas • Arno Kotze • Albert Loubser • Bantu Mene • Msimelelo Mrwebi • Lona Ntsila • Anwar Ohlson • Wikus Oosthuizen • Chadwin Robertson • Nemo Roelofse • Reinart Rohde • Bisto Sam • Jurgens Schoeman • Marquin Smart • Rosco Snyman • Leon Thuynsma • Dreyer van Zyl
Backs	Elfrido Ayford • Ruan Barnard • Rasmus Burger • Shadward Fillies • Juandré Fourie • Fizell Fredericks • Jaydon Fredericks • Erwin Harris • Elroy Havenga • Nathan Kemp • Dundré Maritz • Lenes Nomdo • Lee-Roy Pietersen • Lee-Roy Pojie • Charles Radebe • Johan Steyn • Ethan Williams

=== Discipline ===
The following table contains all the cards handed out during the tournament:

Sendings-off and multiple sin-binnings
Player	Team	Sent off (straight red)	Temporarily suspended
Michael Herbert	Griffons U21	1	1
Etienne Storm	Limpopo Blue Bulls U21	1	0
Chris van Leeuwen	Pumas U21	1	0
Dylan van der Merwe	Limpopo Blue Bulls U21	0	3
Christoff Craill	Limpopo Blue Bulls U21	0	2
Deon Taljaard	Griquas U21	0	2

Single sin-binnings
Player	Team	Sent off (straight red)	Temporarily suspended
Chase Benito	Border U21	0	1
Siviwe Bisset	Border U21	0	1
Raymond Boshoff	Griffons U21	0	1
Jonathan Botha	Falcons U21	0	1
Rasmus Burger	SWD U21	0	1
Siphamandla Dama	Border U21	0	1
Done Davids	Limpopo Blue Bulls U21	0	1
Ruben Farber	Falcons U21	0	1
Juandré Fourie	SWD U21	0	1
Jaydon Fredericks	SWD U21	0	1
Nico Graaff	Griquas U21	0	1
Brandon Haas	SWD U21	0	1
Johannes Janse van Rensburg	Border U21	0	1
Jackie Jonkers	Falcons U21	0	1
Marthinus Kemp	Griquas U21	0	1
Brian Leitch	Limpopo Blue Bulls U21	0	1
Cameron Lentoor	Border U21	0	1
Albert Lubbe	Pumas U21	0	1
Damien May	Griffons U21	0	1
Estian Meiring	Pumas U21	0	1
Richard Meiring	Griffons U21	0	1
Brian Naudé	Limpopo Blue Bulls U21	0	1
Thabo Ngomane	Boland U21	0	1
Lona Ntsila	SWD U21	0	1
Christiaan Pelser	Griffons U21	0	1
Francois Pelser	Pumas U21	0	1
André Potgieter	Falcons U21	0	1
Kennedy Rorwana	Boland U21	0	1
Johan Swart	Falcons U21	0	1
Hardus van Aswegen	Falcons U21	0	1
Anré van Vollenhoven	Limpopo Blue Bulls U21	0	1
Dreyer van Zyl	SWD U21	0	1
Warren Williams	Boland U21	0	1
Soso Xakalashe	Border U21	0	1
* Legend: (red card) = Sent off, (yellow card) = Sin-binned

== Referees ==
The following referees officiated matches in the 2015 Under-21 Provincial Championship Group B:

2015 Under-21 Provincial Championship Group A referees
Referees	Rodney Boneparte • AJ Jacobs • Jaco Kotze • Pieter Maritz • Vusi Msibi • Sindile Ngcese • Tahla Ntshakaza • Francois Pretorius • Jaco Pretorius • Oregopotse Rametsi • Archie Sehlako • Ricus van der Hoven • Lourens van der Merwe • Renier Vermeulen

== See also ==
- Currie Cup
- 2015 Currie Cup Premier Division
- 2015 Currie Cup First Division
- 2015 Under-21 Provincial Championship Group A
- 2015 Under-19 Provincial Championship Group A
- 2015 Under-19 Provincial Championship Group B
