= Abbie Park Ferguson =

- Born: April 4, 1837; Whately, Massachusetts, U.S.
- Died: March 25, 1919 (aged 81); Wellington, South Africa
- Education: Mount Holyoke College
- Occupations: teacher, college president
- Known for: founding Huguenot Seminary

Abbie Park Ferguson (April 4, 1837 – March 25, 1919) was founder and president of Huguenot Seminary (later Huguenot College).

== Education ==
She graduated from Mount Holyoke College (then Mount Holyoke Female Seminary) in 1856. She taught in Niles, Michigan until 1858 and later in New Haven, Connecticut from 1867 until 1873.In 1869, she accompanied two female students to chaperone them in their studies abroad in Europe. While abroad, Park Ferguson and the girls were detained from their travels when war broke out. They had to wait for peace to be brokered before continuing their travels.

== Huguenot Seminary ==
In 1873 Ferguson and another Mount Holyoke graduate (1862), Anna Bliss, moved to Cape Town, South Africa and established the first women's college in the region, Huguenot Seminary in 1874. She took a leave of absence from 1905 to 1906 during which time she received an M.A. from Mount Holyoke. In 1912, Mount Holyoke honoured her in absentia with a Doctor of Letters. The seminary school was established as an official college in 1898. She was the first president of the seminary school and continued her presidency until her retirement in 1910. She died nine years later at the age of 82 while still living in South Africa.
