= Anna Bliss =

American teacher in South Africa

- Born: January 14, 1843; Jericho, Vermont, US
- Died: June 25, 1925 (aged 82); Wellington, Western Cape, South Africa
- Education: Amherst College; Mount Holyoke College
- Occupations: Teacher, college president
- Years active: 1862–1920
- Known for: Founding Huguenot Seminary school

Anna Elvira Bliss (January 14, 1843 – June 25, 1925) was an American teacher in South Africa. She grew up in Amherst, Massachusetts, and taught in local schools before answering a request from Andrew Murray for teachers in South Africa. Bliss, with fellow American teacher Abbie Park Ferguson, set up the Huguenot Seminary girls school at Wellington, Western Cape, in 1874. The school grew in size and led to the foundation of the Huguenot University College in the 1880s. Bliss served successively as principal of the primary school, high school and president of the college before her retirement in 1920.

== Early life ==
Anna Elvira Bliss was born on January 14, 1843, in Jericho, Vermont. She was one of eight children (six sons and two daughters) of Genas and Elvira Bliss. Bliss' father was a Congregational minister until his retirement upon which the family moved to Amherst, Massachusetts. Bliss attended the Amherst Academy and graduated from Mount Holyoke College in 1862. Until 1872 Bliss combined caring for ailing members of her family with teaching at towns in the Massachusetts hills.

== South Africa ==
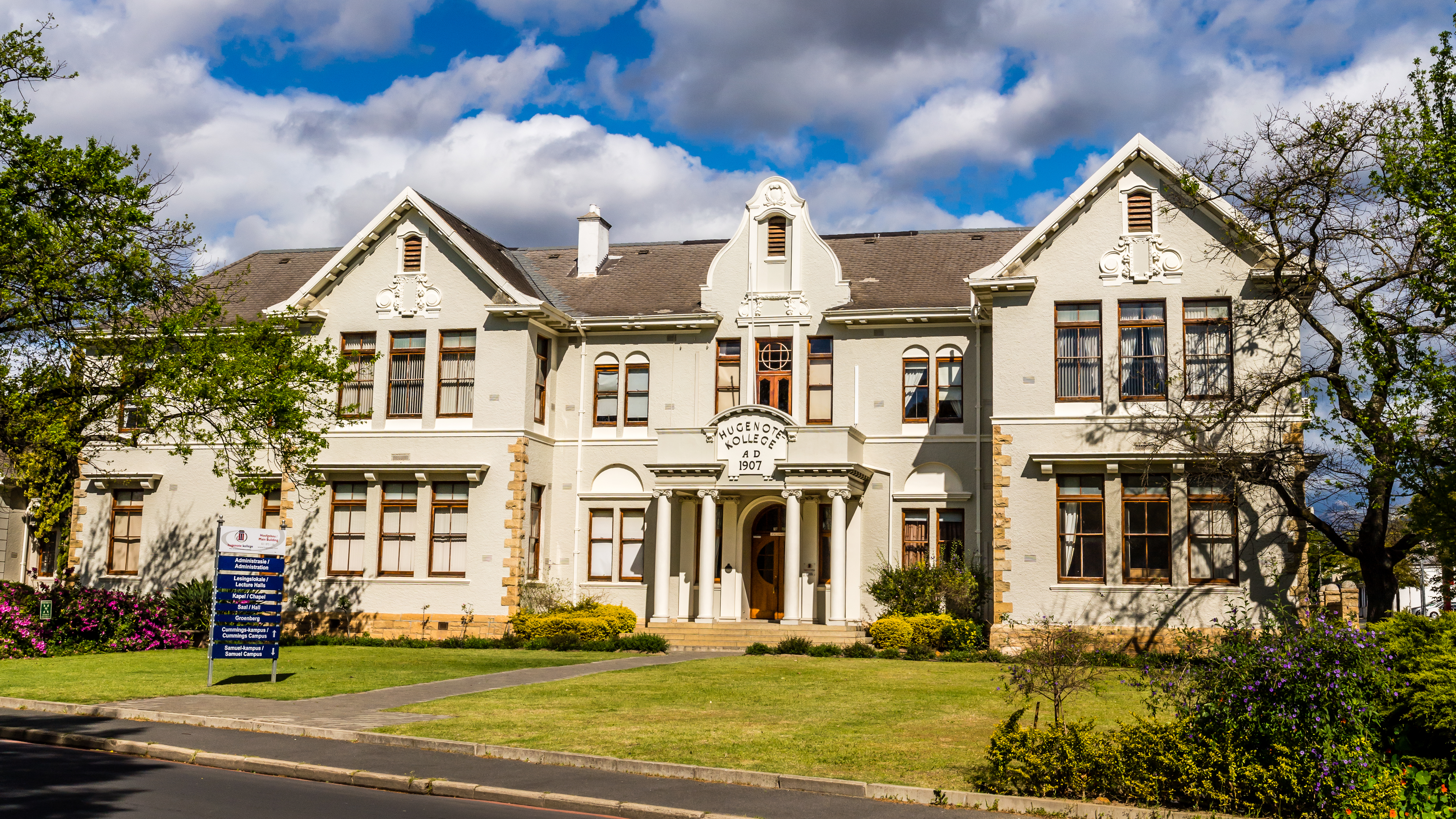
A 1907 Huguenot University College building

Bliss' teaching led to a Christian revival at her school in Peru, Massachusetts, which was noticed by the principal of Mount Holyoke who recommended her as a teacher to the South African minister and missionary Andrew Murray. Murray had appealed for graduates to establish a women's seminary in South Africa. Bliss and fellow Mount Holyoke graduate Abbie Park Ferguson boarded a ship in the US in September and arrived at Cape Town on November 15, 1873. They were met at the harbour by a delegation from the Dutch Reformed Church which was to support the seminary.

Bliss and Ferguson established the Huguenot Seminary girls school at Wellington, Western Cape, which opened in January 1874, teaching 54 girls. As well as teaching Bliss helped manage the finances and supervise the cleaning of the school. A Sunday school was also provided for coloured children. The seminary was expanded later in 1874 and Bliss was appointed head of the primary school (Ferguson was head of the high school).

Ferguson founded Huguenot University College after the 1886 Witwatersrand Gold Rush as the first women's college in South Africa. The Seminary and University College were the first to provide an advanced level of education for South African women and taught many to become teachers and missionaries in Southern Africa. Bliss became principal of the high school in 1899, a position she held until she was appointed president of the University College in 1911, after the retirement of Ferguson, its first president.

Bliss retired from the college in 1920 and died in Wellington on June 25, 1925.
