= Erica cremea =

Conservation status
- Vulnerable (IUCN 3.1)

Scientific classification
- Kingdom: Plantae
- Clade: Tracheophytes
- Clade: Angiosperms
- Clade: Eudicots
- Clade: Asterids
- Order: Ericales
- Family: Ericaceae
- Genus: Erica
- Species: E. cremea

Binomial name
- Erica cremea Dulfer

Species of flowering plant

Erica cremea is a plant belonging to the genus Erica. The plant is endemic to the Western Cape and is prevalent on Sneeukop near Wellington. Its habitat is threatened by invasive plants.
