= Ethel Doidge =

Mycologist and bacteriologist (1887-1965)

Ethel Mary Doidge
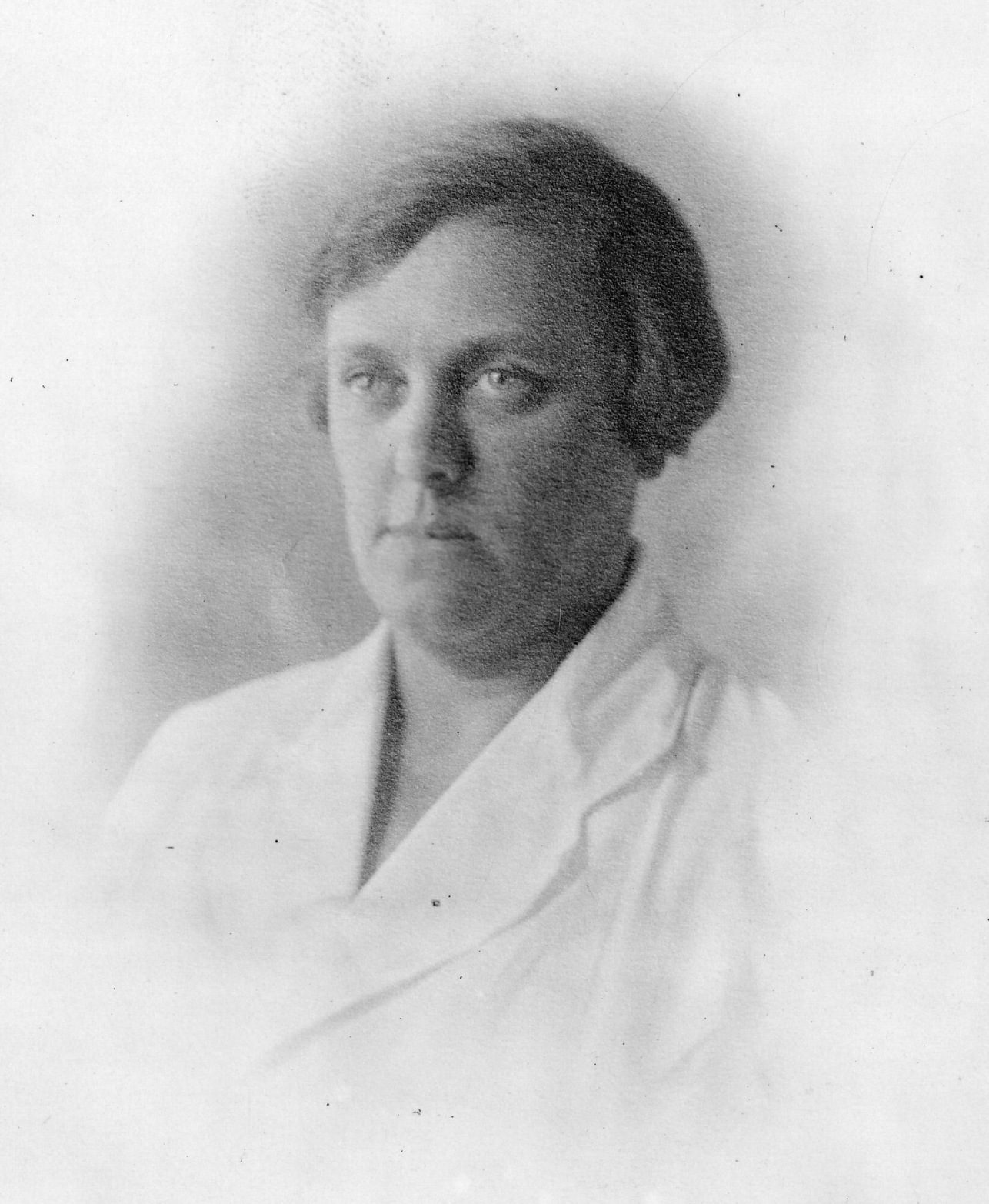
- Ethel Mary Doidge (1887-1965)
- Born: 31 May 1887; Nottingham, England
- Died: 22 September 1965 (aged 78); Anerley, KwaZulu-Natal, South Africa
- Occupations: Mycologist and bacteriologist

Ethel Mary Doidge (1887–1965) was a British born, South African mycologist and bacteriologist.

Doidge was born in Nottingham, England on 31 May 1887 and was educated in South Africa at Epworth School in Pietermaritzburg and Huguenot College, Wellington, Western Cape. In 1908 she joined the Transvaal Department of Agriculture as an assistant to Dr I.B. Pole Evans. In 1909 she was awarded a M.A. degree by the University of the Cape of Good Hope, and in 1914 she was awarded a D. Sc. degree; she was the first woman to obtain a doctorate in South Africa. Her thesis was entitled A bacterial disease of mango, Bacillus mangiferae n. sp.. This disease was previously unknown outside South Africa and caused considerable loss to mango growers there for some years. In 1912 she was elected a Fellow of the Linnean Society (F.L.S). She was appointed assistant chief of the Division of Botany and Plant Pathology in 1919 and became principal plant pathologist in 1929, a position she held until her retirement in 1942. Her services were retained for a further four years, during which time she completed her work on The South African fungi and lichens.

Through her knowledge of bacteriology and mycology, she managed to solve problems of importance to agriculture. Doidge was appointed a member of the first council of the University of South Africa. She was a founding member of the South African Biological Society and in 1922 was given the Society's major award, the Senior Captain Scott Memorial Medal, for her research on South African plant pathology.

== Publications ==
- "A Bacterial Disease of the Mango. Bacillus Mangiferae N.sp". Annals of Applied Biology (PhD). 2 (1): 1–45. 1915. doi:10.1111/j.1744-7348.1915.tb05424.x. hdl:2027/osu.32435006283261. ISSN 0003-4746.
- The South African Fungi and Lichens to the End of 1945. Government Printer, South Africa. 1950.
- "A TOMATO CANKER". Annals of Applied Biology. 7 (4): 407–430. 1921. doi:10.1111/j.1744-7348.1921.tb05528.x. ISSN 0003-4746.
- "A Bacterial Blight of Pear Blossoms Occurring in South Africa". Annals of Applied Biology. 4 (1–2): 50–74. 1917. doi:10.1111/j.1744-7348.1917.tb05904.x. ISSN 0003-4746.
- "South African Microthyriaceae". Transactions of the Royal Society of South Africa. 8 (1): 235–282. 1919. doi:10.1080/00359191909520002. ISSN 0035-919X.

== See also ==
- List of mycologists
- List of South African plant botanical authors
- Timeline of women in science

== Notes and references ==
- Gunn, Mary; Codd, L. E. W. (1981). Botanical Exploration Southern Africa. CRC Press. ISBN 978-0-86961-129-6.
- HSRC (2000). Women Marching Into the 21st Century: Wathint' Abafazi, Wathint' Imbokodo. HSRC Press. ISBN 978-0-7969-1966-3.
