= Zeederberg Coach Company =

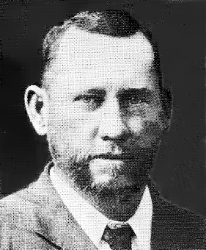
Christiaan Hendrik Zeederberg

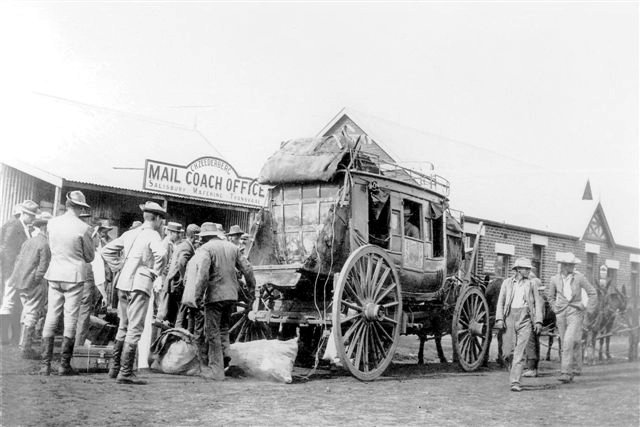
Zeederberg Coach ready to depart from Bulawayo circa 1896

The Zeederberg Coach Company was a South African horse-drawn mail and stage coach service operating during the late 1800s and early 1900s, and founded by four Zeederberg brothers: Lewis, Pieter, Roelof and Christiaan, who were of Swedish descent.

Roelof Abraham Zeederberg, their grandfather, arrived in Cape Town in 1798 from Sweden. A vessel carrying a cargo of coffee had been wrecked off the Cape coast, and sensing a business opportunity, Roelof bought the rights to the wreck and salvaged the coffee. The Zeederberg descendants eventually dispersed throughout southern Africa, rendering service in the fields of farming, medicine, commerce, industry and law.

The discovery of diamonds on the Vaal River at Kimberley in the 1860s, and gold on the Witwatersrand ridge in the Transvaal in 1886, created a demand for passenger and goods transport, which was met during the next 30 years by some sixteen coach services including CH Zeederberg Ltd. The outbreak of the War of Independence in 1880 virtually brought carrier services to a halt. By 1882 gold was found in Northern Transvaal, and Pretoria took on a new lease of life. More gold discoveries in the Northern and Eastern Transvaal in 1884 meant that business was booming for the few companies who had established their routes. Railways had got off to a very slow start in South Africa; at the beginning of 1884 there were only 1,318 miles (2,135 km) of track in operation, of which 1213 were in the Cape Colony. This was the position in 1884, when two of the brothers, Lewis Andries (Louw) Zeederberg and Pieter Frederick (Piet) Zeederberg, who had been operating a wagon transport service south of the Vaal River, decided to extend their operations into the Transvaal. They had wide experience in this field, having carried supplies during the Zulu War, and on the cessation of hostilities, equipment and supplies from Durban and De Aar to the diamond fields. With six wagons in their fleet they decided to send for their older brother Roelof Abraham (Dolf) Zeederberg, who had given up a career as a chemist due to ill-health. Dolf joined them at Kimberley and they put him in charge of two ox-wagons carrying much-needed equipment and supplies to the mining settlements as far north as the Limpopo ('crocodile') River. Meanwhile, they operated a fleet of ten ox-wagons to Potchefstroom (Orange Free State), Pretoria and the Eastern Transvaal routes. Their success led them to send for their younger brother, Christiaan Hendrik (Döel) Zeederberg, then aged 23, to assist them in coping with the expanded operations. In 1887 the partners started the first mail-coach route between Johannesburg and Kimberley. In 1890 they added a service between Pretoria, Pietersburg and the gold rush town of Leydsdorp.

In 1890 Cecil Rhodes commissioned Zeederberg to survey potential road links into Rhodesia. This initial reconnaissance took three years of intensive riding and walking between Fort Tuli, Fort Victoria (now Masvingo), Salisbury (now Harare) and Broken Hill (now Kabwe). The route went to the hotel at Fort Tuli, crossing the Limpopo River by means of a pontoon which the company had built, and thence via Fort Victoria and Fort Charter to Salisbury. The "Guide to Southern Africa" for 1893, quotes the fare from Tuli to Salisbury as being £15 while the trip took 14 days. This section later expanded to include Umtali and Victoria Falls. During the Matabele Rebellion of 1896 Zeederberg transported supplies for the British troops. During the Boer War mail transport contracts were suspended and the company's resources placed at the disposal of the British Government - Canadian and Australian troops were conveyed from Marandellas to Bulawayo in order to assist at the relief of Mafeking. Cecil Rhodes said of Christian Zeederberg that he had done more than any other man to open up Rhodesia.

Between 1895 and 1897 the Zeederbergs dissolved their partnership, and Döel got the monopoly for the mail coaches north of Pietersburg and the internal routes in Rhodesia. He bought out his brothers, reorganised the CH Zeederberg business and moved the firm's headquarters from Johannesburg to Pietersburg. The other brothers continued running the Zeederberg Coaching Company in the Transvaal. The Matabele Rebellion of 1896 threw the entire burden of provisioning the beleaguered settlers on to the Zeederbergs, the railhead still being Mochudi in Bechuanaland.

At the start of the 20th century, mail coaches disappeared rapidly. Roelof Abraham (Dolf) Zeederberg carried on operating the company, and was still running coaches through the northern and eastern Transvaal after the establishment of the Union of South Africa in 1910. The last mail coaches in the old Transvaal operated in 1916 from Pietersburg over Haenertsburg to the Lowveld. As late as 1925 the South and East African Year Book and Guide stated: Although motors have been rapidly superseding animal traction during the past few years, in some parts of Rhodesia and the Transvaal passengers still travel by coach. Fares were at the rate of 9d to 2s a mile. The last coach rolled from Graskop to Pilgrim's Rest and this romantic era in our history was concluded. In about 1930 the Zeederberg family closed the coach business in favour of car hire. During the 1930s the Zeederbergs were running tourist safaris by car from Johannesburg, until the outbreak of World War 2 put a temporary end to travel for pleasure.

At the height of its operations Zeederbergs were using coaches made by the American firm of Abbot-Downing, which had space for 12 passengers inside and 6 more clinging to the roof straps. Two original Zeederberg coaches are known to survive. One from 1888 was sent in 1964 to the National Museum of Rhodesia (at Bulawayo) for repair and exhibition, and was still there in 1974. One from 1895 (the only original one left in South Africa) was moved in 1995 from the Africana Museum to a new home at MuseuM AfricA in Newtown, Johannesburg.

== The Ghost Coach ==
(From VeldExpress, HarryZeederberg, 1971)

Do you glimpse it through the gum trees
That grey and ghostly sight?
Do you hear the horses hoof beats
This still and silent night?
Down the track it goes a'gliding
No dust upon the air,
I can see the outline clearly -
A coach and driver there.
Can you come with me a minute?
There in the moonlight beam
I am certain 'tis the spectre
Of a game and gallant team.
They are straining in their traces,
The muscles taught and true.
You can see their eyes agleaming -
The Mail - it must go through.
But coaches, they ceased running
These many years ago.
It must be ghostly greatness
There in that brilliant glow.
Let us listen for the laughter
Of the daring driver's call
To each horse and mule he knows well -
Encouraging them all.
Could it be that such a service
Will never really die?
And again we'll hear it echo
With the Gamma's age-old cry?
Will they ride the road forever,
In a faint and weary way?
Will they stir the hearts of heroes
As they did of yesterday?
When machines make mighty progress
O'er roads no longer rough
There'll be that elfin echo
Of the coach so tried and tough.

== See also ==
- Pioneer Column
