= Huguenot College =

Private college in Wellington, South Africa

Coordinates: 33°38′17″S 19°0′39″E

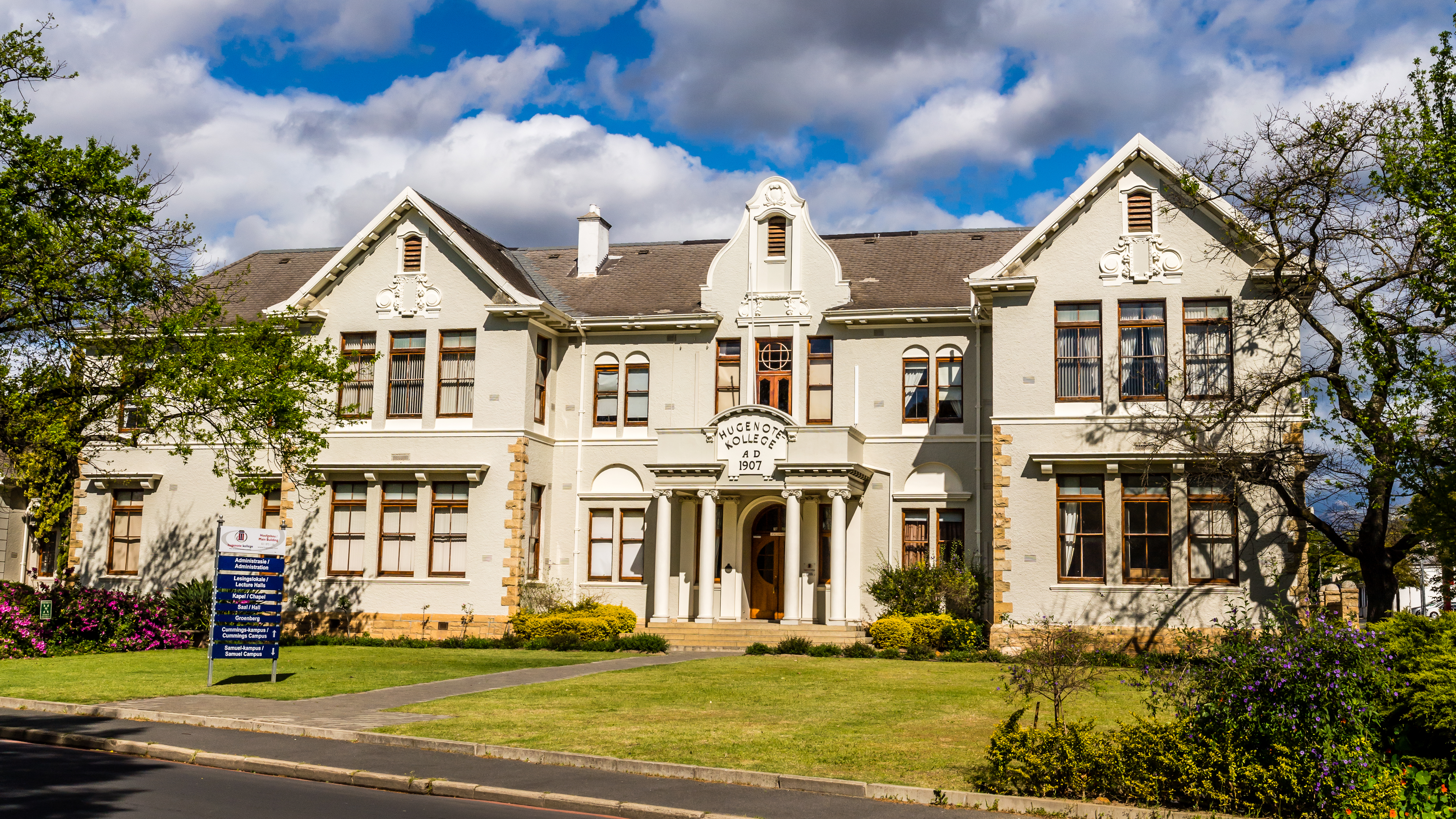
- Established: 1951
- Location: Wellington, South Africa
- Website: hugenote.com

The Huguenot College in Wellington, South Africa, is a private institute focused on training social and church service workers.

== Historical overview ==
The Huguenot College has its origins in three educational institutions which previously existed in Wellington, namely the Huguenot Seminary, the Huguenot University College and Friedenheim. The Huguenot Seminary was established in 1874 through the efforts of the well-known Dr Andrew Murray. The Huguenot University College developed from the Huguenot Seminary, and was a constituent college of the University of South Africa up to the end of 1950, when this University College had to close.

Friedenheim was established in 1904 and offered courses in missionary work, social work and Biblical instruction until the end of 1950.

When the Huguenot University College had to close, successful negotiations were initiated by the Dutch Reformed Church for taking over its grounds, buildings and equipment. The Huguenot College was officially opened on 28 February 1951.

== Culture-historical context and character ==
The renowned history of the Huguenot College is reflected in the architectural environment of the institution. The Huguenot College has been situated in Wellington since the previous century and is accommodated in valuable and scenic buildings in an atmosphere very similar to both the micro-climate and historical environment of other university towns such as Potchefstroom and Stellenbosch. The Huguenot College endeavours to preserve this environment and character for generations to come.

Since its inception the Huguenot College was closely connected with the Dutch Reformed Church. As a minister of the DR Church, Dr Andrew Murray fulfilled a leading role in establishing the Huguenot Seminary, Friedenheim and the Mission Institute. The DR Church managed the College and until the nineteen sixties accepted responsibility for financing the College. In the officially approved constitution the Christian values and ethos of the College are described. Although the College can be formally described as a Christian institution, it is not an exclusive institution for church members only and “faith” is not a requirement for admission to the College. It is indeed so that the Church and the College Board expect a value system inspired by Christian faith to be a guiding principle for the management and practice at the College.

== Ownership and legal status ==
The land and buildings of all three College premises are the property of the Western Cape Synod of the DR Church. The College operates with the understanding that the Church will not need the land and buildings for any other purpose. The Huguenot College considered the possibility of purchasing the land and buildings for a nominal amount, but found that the transfer cost and registration fees will be too high and therefore did not pursue this option any further. The Huguenot College is a legal entity and functions autonomously, including generation of funds, own decision making and the appropriation of funds.

== Governing structure ==
The College is governed by the Board of Directors of the Huguenot College and the members of this Council are appointed as follows:

- 4 representatives appointed by the academic partner university
- 2 representatives appointed by the Dutch Reformed Church (General Synod)
- 2 representatives appointed by the owner of the buildings and premises, the Dutch Reformed Church (Western and Southern Cape)
- 2 representatives appointed by the General Synod of the Uniting Reformed Church in Southern Africa
- 1 representative appointed jointly by the DR Church, Wellington and URC, Wellington
- 1 representative of the Wellington Local Authority, appointed by the Drakenstein Municipality
- The Rector of the College
- 1 representative from the HC Academic Council appointed by the Council
- 4 experts with significant experience of the world of finance, company legislation and general management
- 2 executive directors appointed by the board
- A company secretary (non member)

== Employment of graduates and interaction with employers ==
Most of the students currently enrolled at the College are bursary students who have to comply with bursary conditions after graduating. Students graduating from the Department of Play Therapy tend to be employed in private practices, whereas students from the other departments are mostly employed by Provincial and Local Authorities, government institutions and NGOs.
