= Wellington, South Africa =

Wellington
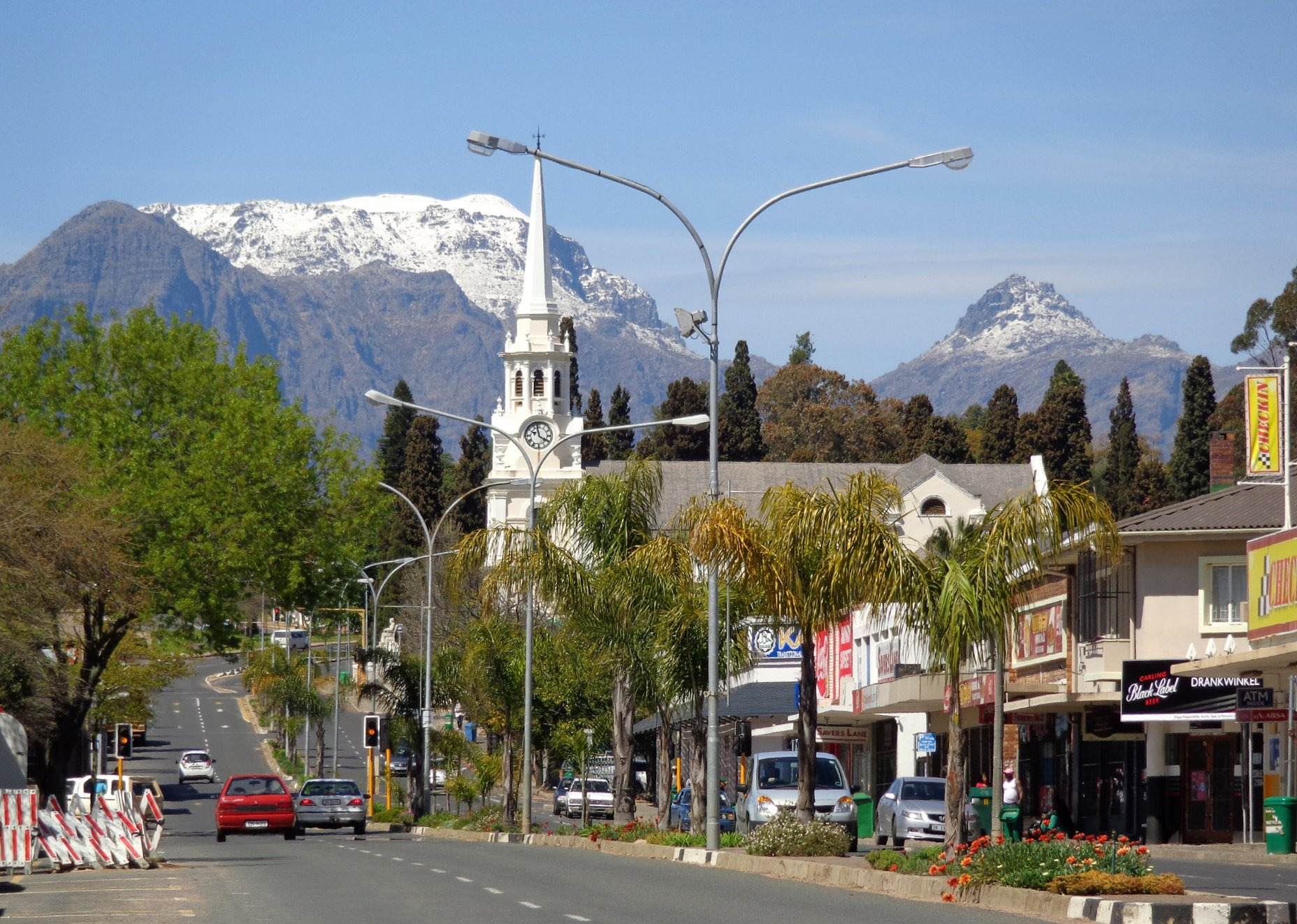
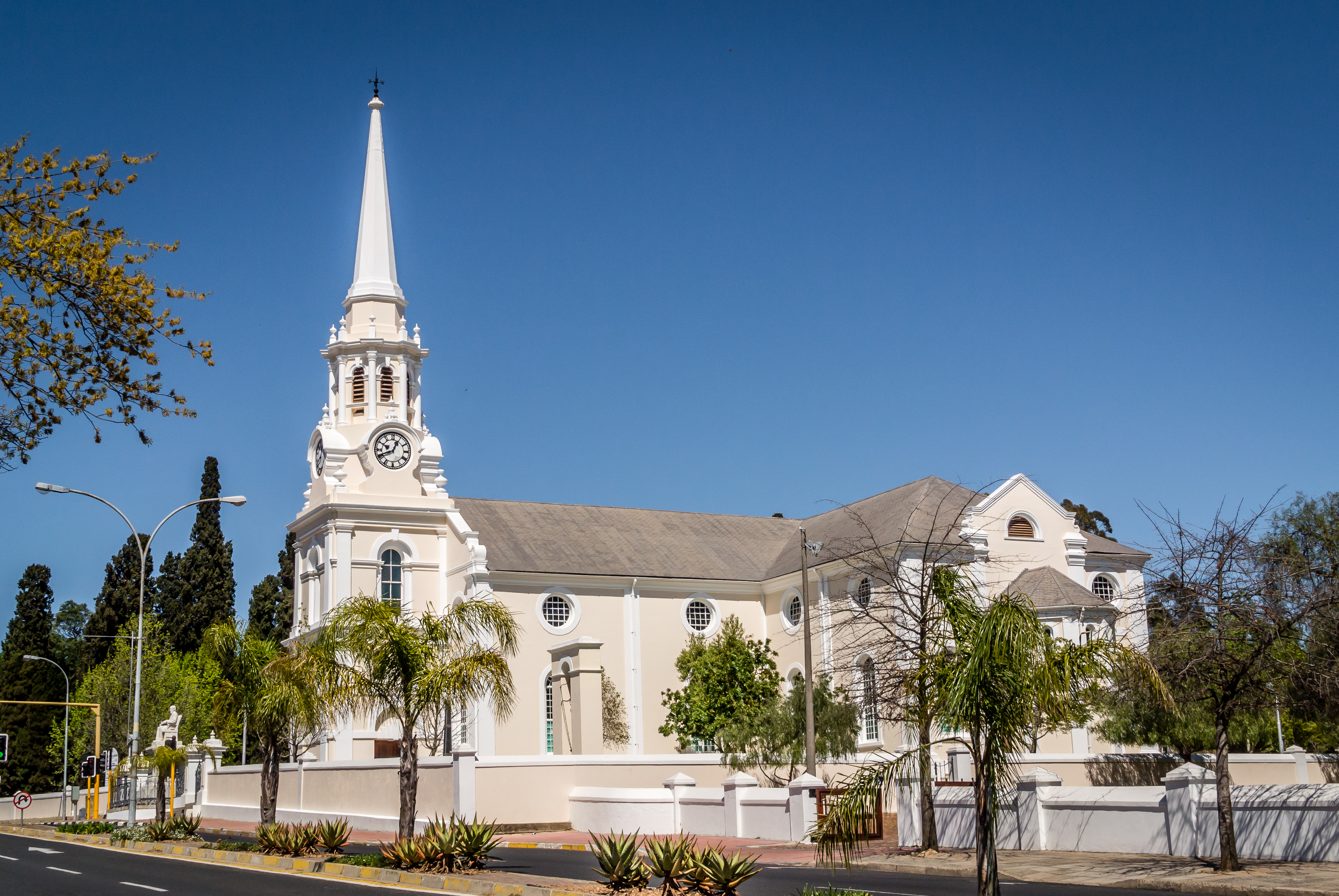
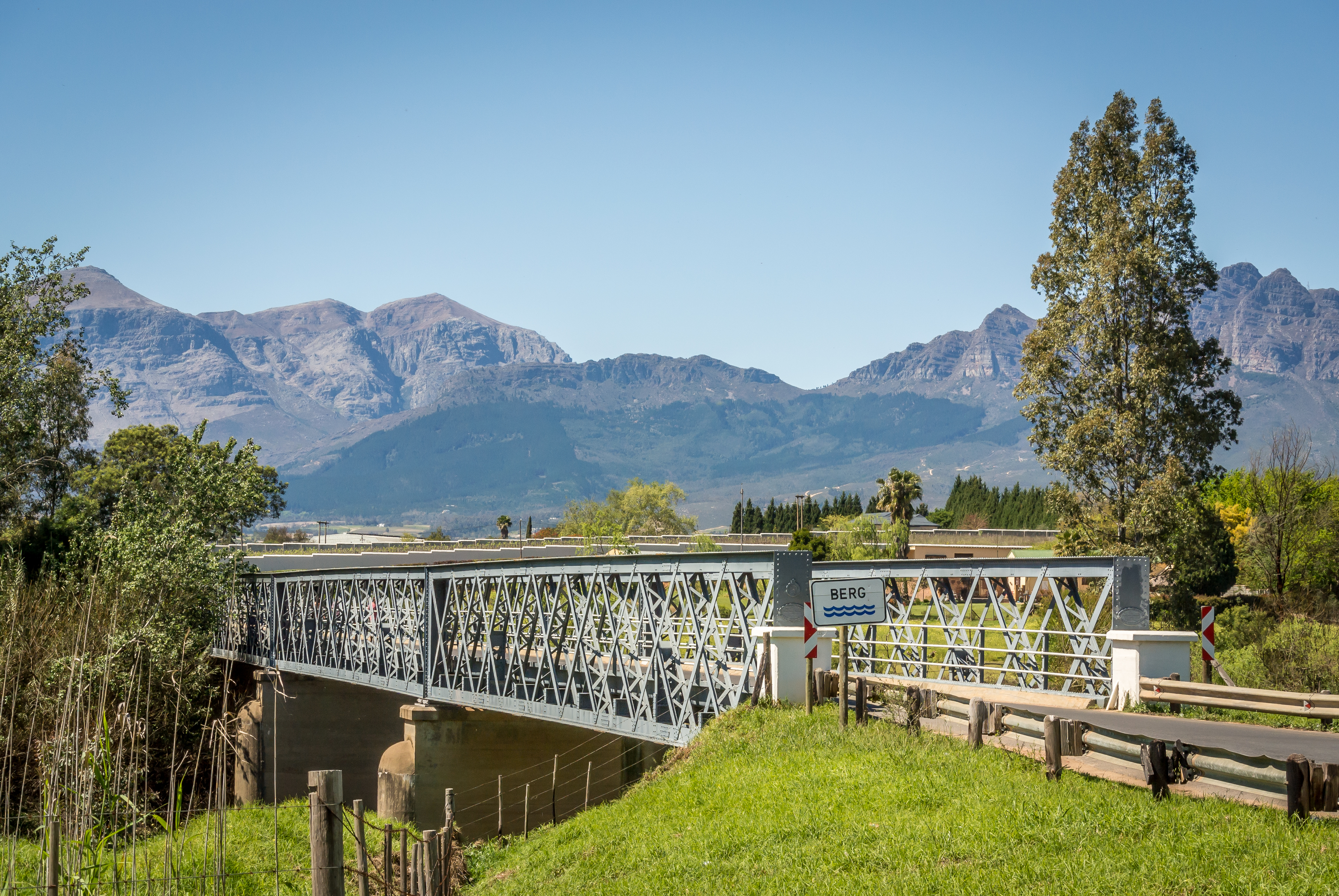
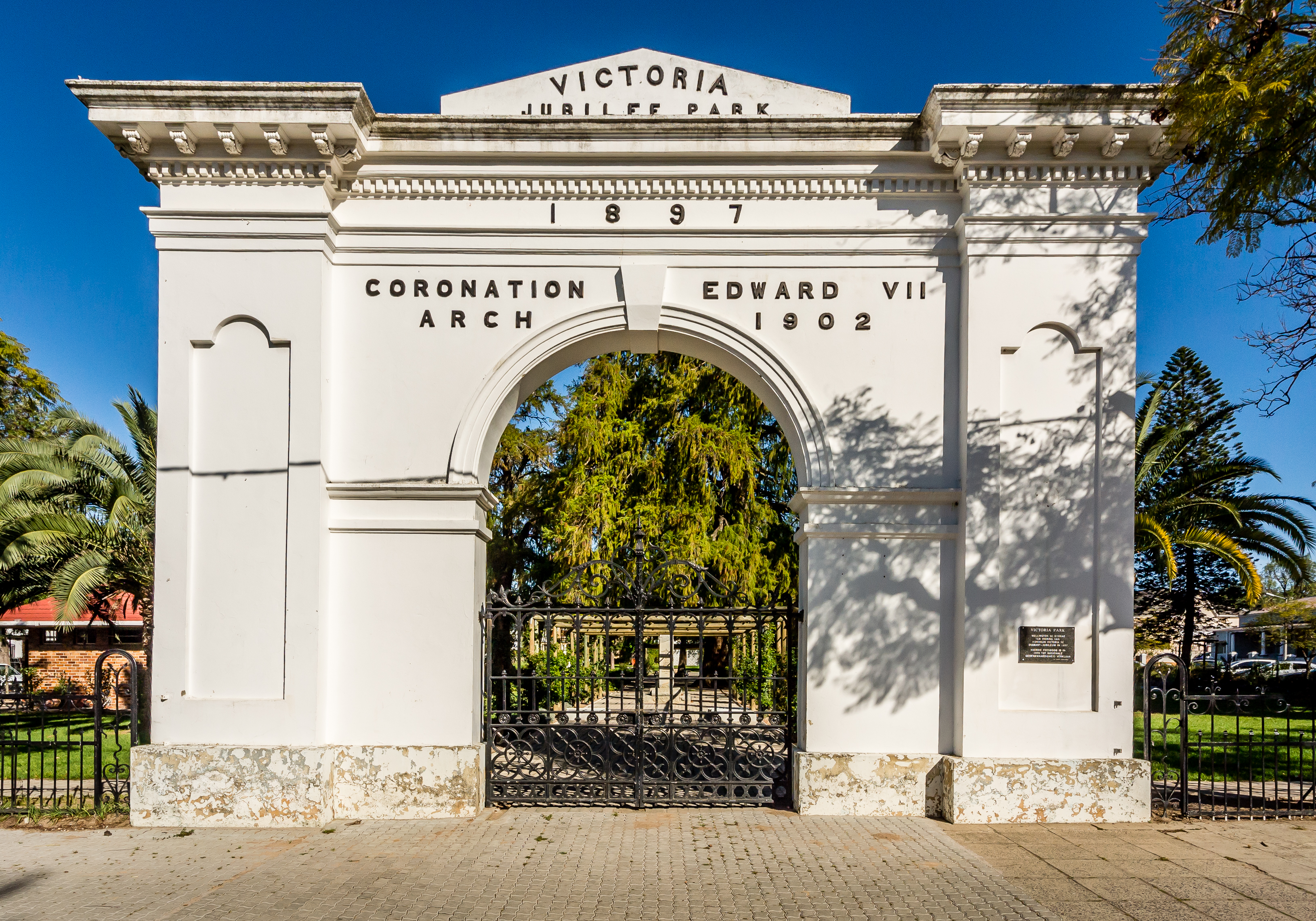
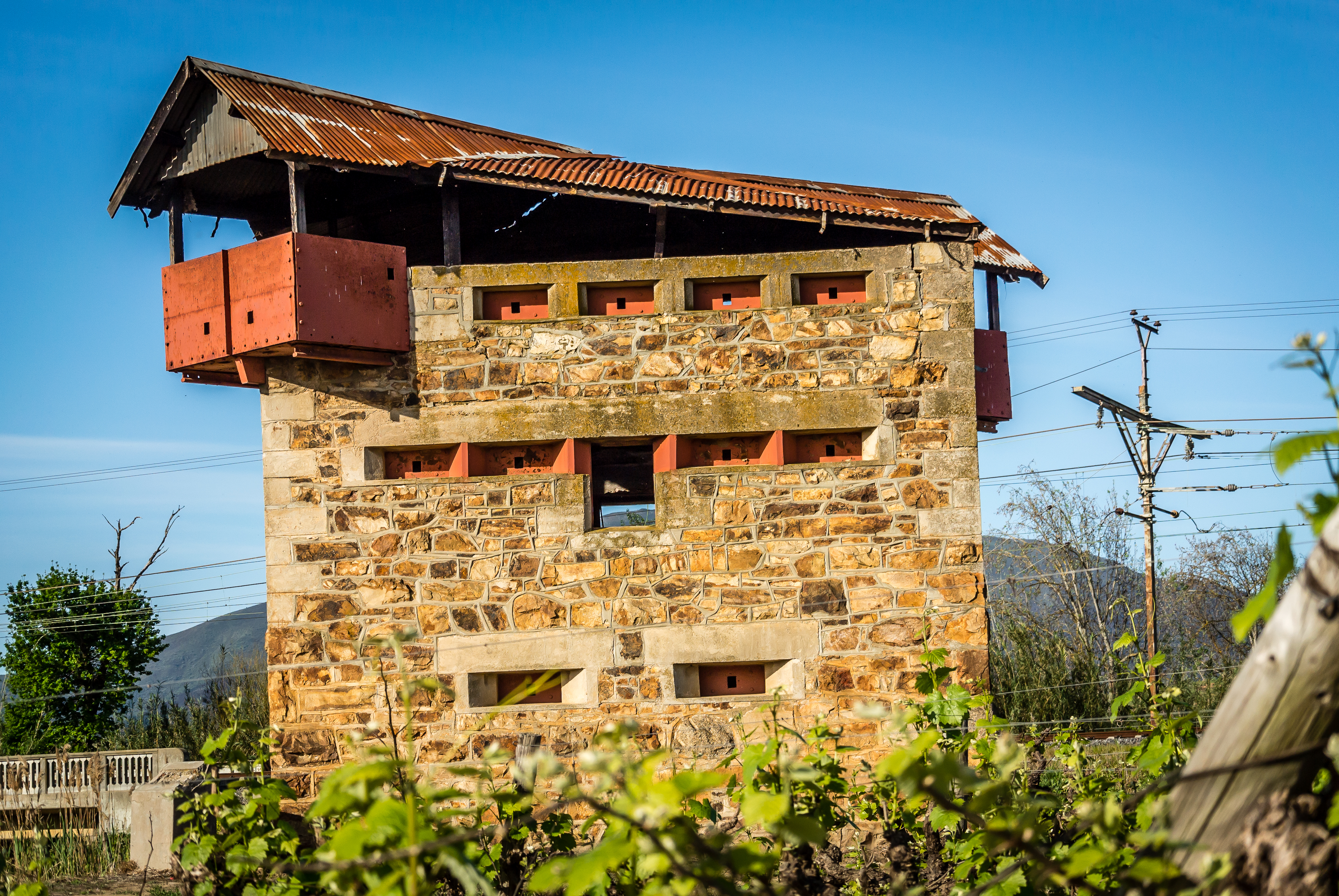
- From top, Wellington CBD, with the NG Mother Church and snowy Wemmershoek Peak beyond. Dutch Reformed Church Complex in Wellington (centre left). Lady Loch Bridge over the Berg River (centre right). Coronation Arch in Victoria Jubilee Park (bottom left). Second Boer War block house (bottom right).

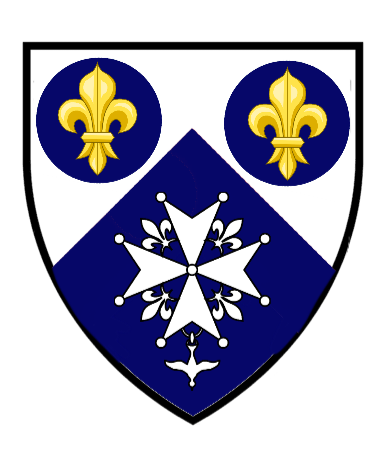
- Coat of arms
- Motto: Par Foi et Loyaute (French: By faith and loyalty)
- Location within Western Cape Location within South Africa
- Coordinates: 33°38′S 18°59′E
- Country: South Africa
- Province: Western Cape
- District: Cape Winelands
- Municipality: Drakenstein
- First settled by Europeans: 1685
- Established: 1840

Area
  - Total: 30.16 km^{2} (11.64 sq mi)

Population (2011)
  - Total: 55,543
  - Density: 1,842/km^{2} (4,770/sq mi)

Racial makeup (2011)
  - Black African: 16.2%
  - Coloured: 67.3%
  - Indian/Asian: 0.4%
  - White: 15.4%
  - Other: 0.6%

First languages (2011)
  - Afrikaans: 81.2%
  - Xhosa: 10.7%
  - English: 5.9%
  - Other: 2.1%
- Time zone: UTC+2 (SAST)
- Postal code (street): 7655
- PO box: 7654
- Website: Wellington Tourism

Wellington is a town in the Western Cape province of South Africa with a population of approximately 62,000. Wellington's economy is centered on products of agriculture such as deciduous fruit, table grapes, wine and brandy. The town is located approximately 75 km north-east of Cape Town, reached by the N1 motorway and R44. Due to the growth of the Vlakkeland and Mbekweni township south of the town, it now forms a de facto urban unit with Paarl, just 10 km to the south. Wellington now officially falls under the Drakenstein Local Municipality, which also covers Saron and Paarl.

== Location ==
Wellington is situated at the foot of the Groenberg on the banks of the Kromme Rivier (Dutch for Crooked River) and forms the centre of the Cape Winelands with its picturesque environment and numerous wineries. The town is at the base of one of the oldest mountain passes in South Africa, Bain's Kloof Pass, built by master road-builder Andrew Geddes Bain. The town is the home of the Boland Rugby Union and the professional rugby team the Boland Kavaliers. The town is also an academic centre, with Cape Peninsula University of Technology, Timothy Ministry Training, Bible Media, Huguenot High School, Weltevrede Senior Secondary School, Wellington High School, and Bergriver Senior Secondary School all falling within the town.

== Etymology ==
Originally known as Limiet Valley (border or frontier valley), the area became known as Val du Charron or Wagenmakersvallei (Valley of the Wagonmaker) toward the end of the seventeenth century when the French Huguenots settled there. After the formal establishment of the town in 1840, the name was changed to Wellington in honour of the Arthur Wellesley, 1st Duke of Wellington, renowned soldier and conqueror of Napoleon at the Battle of Waterloo, as suggested by Sir George Napier.

== Coats of arms ==
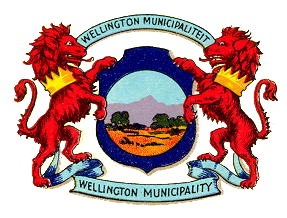
Municipality (1) — Wellington was a municipality in its own right from 1873 to 2000. On 18 June 1918, the town council adopted a pseudo-heraldic design as the municipal arms. The shield was blue, and contained a landscape scene in a circular border. The shield was supported by two red lions, each with a golden coronet around its neck (these being the supporters of the arms of the Duke of Wellington). The arms were depicted on a cigarette card issued in 1931.

Municipality (2) — On 22 June 1948, the council approved a new coat of arms, designed by Ivan Mitford-Barberton and H. Ellis Tomlinson. This was in response to a Cape Provincial Administration circular calling on municipalities to have their arms checked and, if necessary, re-designed to make them heraldically correct. The arms were registered at the Bureau of Heraldry in February 1987.

The design reflected the Huguenot origins of the town: Per chevron Argent and Azure, in chief two hurts, each charged with a fleur-de-lis Or, in base a Huguenot cross, Argent (in layman's terms: the shield is divided into silver over blue by a chevron-shaped line, in the upper half are two golden fleurs de lis on blue discs and in the lower half is a silver Huguenot cross). A blue mural crown was added as a crest. The existing supporters were retained, but were differenced by adding a silver anchor to the coronet. The motto was "Par foi et loyaute".

== Notable sites ==
Established in 1886, the James Sedgewick Distillery is located in Wellington, and produces the Three Ships range of whiskies, as well as the single grain Bain's Cape Mountain Whisky.
